= 2021–22 Juventus FC (women) season =

Juventus Women 2021–22 football season

Juventus
2021–22 season
- Chairman: Andrea Agnelli
- Head coach: Joe Montemurro
- Stadium: Juventus Training Center
- Serie A: 1st
- Coppa Italia: Winners
- Supercoppa Italiana: Winners
- UEFA Champions League: Quarter-finals
| Home colours | Away colours | Third colours |

The 2021–22 season is the 5th season in the existence of Juventus and the club's 5th consecutive season in the top flight of Italian women's football. In addition to the domestic league, Juventus will participate in this season's editions of the Coppa Italia, the Supercoppa Italiana, and the UEFA Champions League.

On 8 June 2021, Juventus hired Joe Montemurro as team manager.

== Pre-season and friendlies ==
=== Overview ===
On 25 July 2021, Juventus played a friendly against Maltese side Birkirkara winning 12–0 against them. On 31 July, Juventus won against Servette through a Bonansea brace and one goal from Girelli and Berti. On 4 August, Juventus beat 2–1 French side Montpellier. in the 11th minute Girelli gave Juventus the lead with a goal from a Lundorf Skovsen's cross. In the 25th minute Girelli doubled the result after a one-on-one with Lisa Schmitz. In the 38th minute Montpellier's Johanna Elsig shortened the gap through a header. On 8 August, Juventus played against Barcelona in the Joan Gamper Trophy losing 6–0. On 12 August, they played a friendly against Pomigliano losing 3–1.

=== Matches ===
Results list Juventus' goal tally first.

| Date | Opponent | Venue | Result | Scorers | Attendance |
|---|---|---|---|---|---|
| 25 July 2021 | (Malta) Birkirkara | Home | 12–0 | Cernoia 8', Girelli (2) 15' (pen.), 72' Caruso 19', Boattin (2) 20', 36', Bonansea 24', 39' Farrugia (o.g.), 50' Zamanian, 52' Bonfantini, Stašková (2) 56', 74' | 0 |
| 31 July 2021 | (Switzerland) Servette | Home | 4–1 | Bonansea (2) 18', 52', Girelli 64', Berti 90'+2' | 0 |
| 4 August 2021 | (France) Montpellier | Away | 2–1 | Girelli (2) 11', 25' | 0 |
| 8 August 2021 | (Spain) Barcelona (Note: The game was a Joan Gamper Trophy match.) | Away | 0–6 | | c. 3,000 |
| 12 August 2021 | Pomigliano | Home | 1–3 | Girelli 10' | 0 |

== Serie A ==
Juventus began the league season on 28 August 2021 against Pomigliano winning 3–0.

=== Matches ===
| 28 August 2021 1 | Juventus | 3–0 | Pomigliano | Vinovo |
| 20:30 CEST | Rosucci 5'; Caruso 54', 83' | Report | | Stadium: Juventus Training Center |

| 5 September 2021 2 | Fiorentina | 0–3 | Juventus | Florence |
| 17:30 CEST | | Report | Bonansea 37', 73'; Cernoia 87' | Stadium: Stadio Gino Bozzi |

| 12 September 2021 3 | Juventus | 3–0 | Hellas Verona | Vinovo |
| 17:30 CEST | Girelli 40', 48'; Cernoia 52' | Report | | Stadium: Juventus Training Center |

| 25 September 2021 4 | Juventus | 1–0 | Empoli | Vinovo |
| 12:30 CEST | Girelli 70' | Report | | Stadium: Juventus Training Center |

| 2 October 2021 5 | Roma | 1–2 | Juventus | Rome |
| 14:30 CEST | Di Guglielmo 29' | Report | Rosucci 68'; Stašková 87' | Stadium: Stadio Tre Fontane |

| 9 October 2021 6 | Juventus | 2–0 | Napoli | Continassa, Turin |
| 14:30 CEST | Caruso 1'; Cernoia 5' | Report | | Stadium: Juventus Training Center |

| 30 October 2021 7 | Internazionale | 1–2 | Juventus | Solbiate Arno |
| 14:30 CEST | Nchout 76' | Report | Bonansea 71'; Stašková 80' | Stadium: Stadio Felice Chinetti |

| 5 November 2021 8 | Sampdoria | 0–1 | Juventus | Genoa |
| 14:30 CET | | Report | Cernoia 75' | Stadium: Campo sportivo Riccardo Garrone |

| 13 November 2021 9 | Juventus | 5–0 | Lazio | Vinovo |
| 12:30 CET | Bonfantini 5', 84'; Hurtig 29'; Boattin 67'; Nildén 87' | Report | | Stadium: Juventus Training Center |

| 4 December 2021 10 | Sassuolo | 0–2 | Juventus | Sassuolo |
| 14:30 CET | | Report | Girelli 58', 68' | Stadium: Stadio Enzo Ricci |

| 12 December 2021 11 | Juventus | 5–2 | AC Milan | Vinovo |
| | Stašková 7', 81'; Bonansea 36'; Boattin 74' (pen.); Hurtig 90+4' | Report | Adami 2'; Longo 69' | Stadium: Juventus Training Center |

| 16 January 2022 12 | Pomigliano | 0–5 | Juventus | Pomigliano d'Arco |
| 12:30 CET | | Report | Cetinja 30' (o.g.); Hurtig 42'; Cernoia 53'; Bonansea 59'; Gama 90+1' | Stadium: Stadio Ugo Gobbalto |

| 22 January 2022 13 | Fiorentina | 2–2 | Juventus | Florence |
| 14:30 CET | Giacinti 14'; Gama 33' (o.g.) | Report | Cernoia 45+1'; Caruso 57' | Stadium: Stadio Gino Bozzi |

| 6 February 2022 14 | Hellas Verona | 0–1 | Juventus | Verona |
| 14:30 CET | | Report | Lotti 56' (o.g.) | Stadium: Stadio comunale Umberto Capon |

| 27 February 2022 15 | Empoli | 2–1 | Juventus | Vinci |
| | Monterubbiano 9'; Prugna 15' | | Boattin 77' |

| 5 March 2022 16 | Juventus | 1–1 | Roma | Vinovo |
| | Soffia 11' (o.g.) | | Lázaro 61' | Stadium: Juventus Training Center |

| 20 March 2022 17 | Napoli | 0–2 | Juventus | Cercola |
| | | | Hurtig 25'; Caruso 70' |

| 27 March 2022 18 | Juventus | 3–1 | Inter | Vinovo |
| | Boattin 26', 50'; Bonfantini 69' | | Bonetti 31' |

| 3 April 2022 19 | Juventus | 3–1 | Sampdoria | Vinovo |
| | Girelli 28'; Bonansea 31'; Caruso 73' (pen.) | | Bargi 83' |

| 24 April 2022 20 | Lazio | 1–5 | Juventus | Formello |
| | Visentin 28' | | Junge 11', 64'; Caruso 52', 59'; Stašková 87' |

| 7 May 2022 21 | Juventus | 3–1 | Sassuolo | Vinovo |
| | Bonansea 30'; Girelli 36'; Boattin 64' | | Cambiaghi 68' |

| 14 May 2022 22 | Milan | 1–2 | Juventus | Milan |
| | Boureille 90+2' | | Zamanian 30'; Junge 51' |

=== League table ===
| Pos | Team | Pld | W | D | L | GF | GA | GD | Pts | Qualification or relegation |
|---|---|---|---|---|---|---|---|---|---|---|
| 1 | Juventus (C) | 22 | 19 | 2 | 1 | 57 | 14 | +43 | 59 | Qualification to Champions League first round |
| 2 | Roma | 22 | 17 | 3 | 2 | 60 | 18 | +42 | 54 | Qualification to Champions League first round |
| 3 | Milan | 22 | 14 | 4 | 4 | 51 | 19 | +32 | 46 | |
| 4 | Sassuolo | 22 | 13 | 4 | 5 | 44 | 24 | +20 | 43 | |
| 5 | Internazionale | 22 | 12 | 2 | 8 | 42 | 30 | +12 | 38 | |

Source: FIGC
Rules for classification: 1) Points; 2) Goal difference; 3) Number of goals scored; 4) Head-to-head points; 5) Head-to-head goal difference; 6) Head-to-head away goals scored
(C) Champions

== Coppa Italia ==
=== Group stage ===
| 21 November 2021 2 | Roma FC | 1–8 | Juventus | Rome |
| 17:30 CET | Badawiya 57' | Report | Caruso 17', 23'; Hurtig 18', 69'; Bonfantini 20'; Stašková 43', 46', 49' | Stadium: Centro sportivo Certosa |

| 19 December 2021 3 | Pink Bari | 1–4 | Juventus U23 | Bitetto |
| 11:30 CET | Fedotova 69' | Report | Bonfantini 17', 73'; Nilden 47'; Caruso 50' | Stadium: Stadio Antonio Antonucci |

=== Quarter-finals ===
| 30 January 2021 First leg | Internazionale | 1–1 | Juventus | Milan |
| | Njoya 73' | Report | Boattin 90+3' | Stadium: Stadio Felice Chinetti |

| 13 February 2022 Second leg | Juventus | 1–0 (2–1 agg.) | Inter Milan | Vinovo |
| 14:30 CET | Bonansea 14' | Report | | Stadium: Juventus Training Center |

=== Semi-finals ===
| 12 March 2022 First leg | Milan | 1–6 | Juventus | Milan |
| | Thomas 90+3' | | Girelli 9', 62'; Nilden 31'; Rosucci 84'; Bonfantini 88', 90' |

| 1 May 2022 Second leg | Juventus | 5–3 (11–4 agg.) | Milan | Vinovo |
| | Stašková 51', 68'; Bonansea 78'; Caruso 81' (pen.); Boattin 87' | | Thomas 9'; Bergamaschi 49', 57' |

=== Final ===
| 22 May 2022 Final | Juventus | 2–1 | Roma | Ferrara |
| | Girelli 80' (pen.); Gama 84' | | Andressa 23' (pen.) | Stadium: Stadio Paolo Mazza |

== UEFA Champions League ==
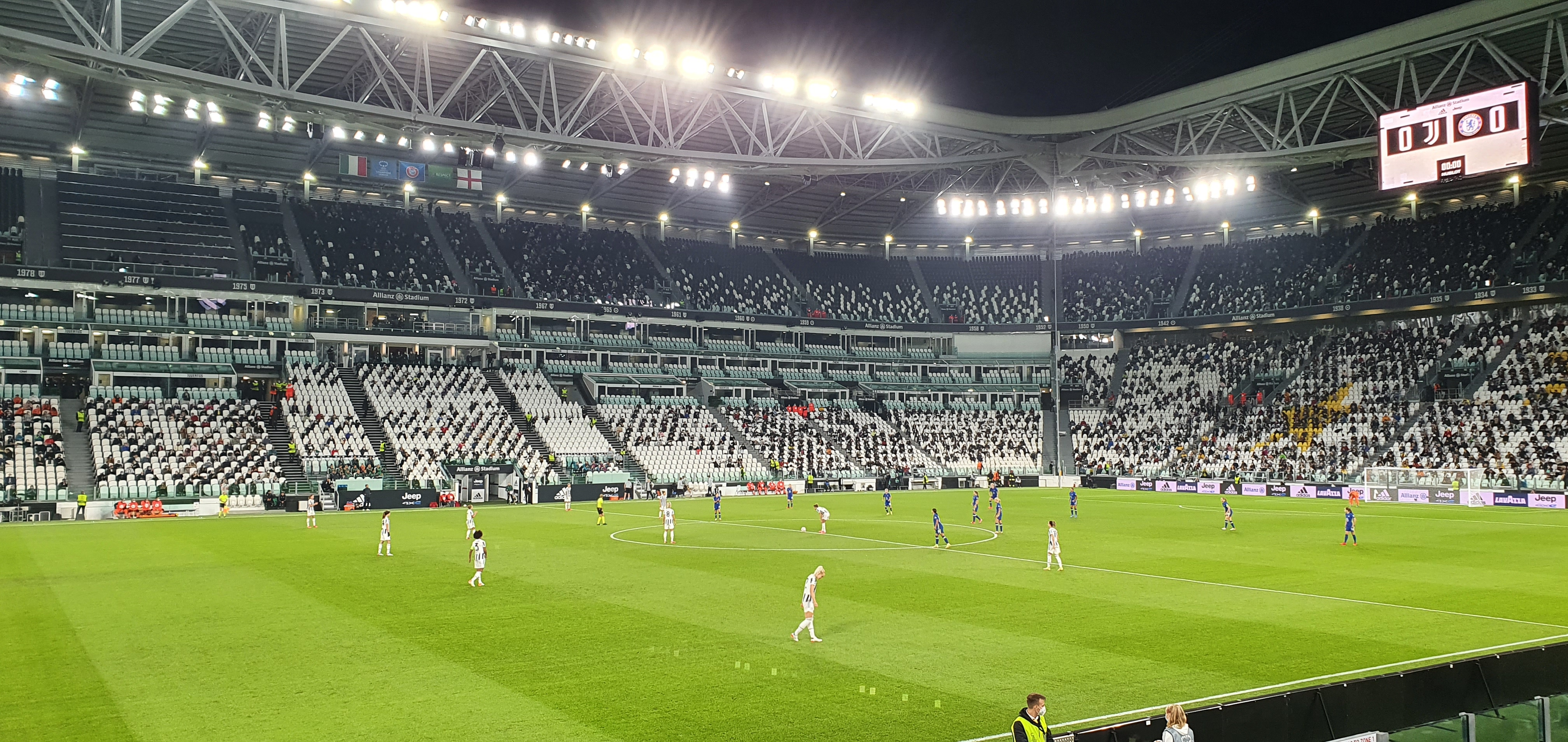
The kick-off of the home game versus Chelsea at Juventus Stadium, 13 October 2021.

As winners of the 2020–21 Serie A, Juventus entered the Champions League in the first round of the Champions Path. On 2 July 2021, Juventus were drawn to play in the four-teams bracket 8 of the first round. In the same date, Juventus were also drawned to play the semi-final of the first round against Macedonian side Kamenica Sasa. On 7 July, UEFA decided to play the final four at Juventus Training Center, which is Juventus' stadium. On 18 August, Juventus played the semi-finals of the first round winning 12–0 against Kamenica Sasa. Juventus played the final against Austrian side St. Pölten winning 4–1 thanks to a Barbara Bonansea brace and one goal from Cristiana Girelli and Lina Hurtig. On 1 September, in the second round, Juventus met Albanian side Vilazina winning 2–0 in the first leg with goals from Girelli and Hurtig. Eight days later Juventus played the second leg winning 1–0, thus qualifying in the group stage.

=== First round ===
==== Bracket ====
Semi-finals
18 August
(Austria) St. Pölten | 7
(Turkey) Beşiktaş | 0
18 August
(Italy) Juventus | 12
(North Macedonia) Kamenica Sasa | 0

Final
21 August
(Austria) St. Pölten | 1
(Italy) Juventus | 4
Third place
21 August
(Turkey) Beşiktaş | 4
(North Macedonia) Kamenica Sasa | 0

==== Matches ====
| 18 August 2021 Semi-final | Juventus (Italy) | 12–0 | (North Macedonia) Kamenica Sasa | Vinovo |
| 15:00 CEST | Caruso 3', 12', 76'; Rosucci 18'; Girelli 45+2', 56'; Bonansea 51'; Zamanian 59'; Stašková 64', 84', 90'; Bonfantini 90+2' | Report | | Stadium: Juventus Training Center; Referee: Alexandra Ponomareva (Russia) |

| 21 August 2021 Final | St. Pölten (Austria) | 1–4 | (Italy) Juventus | Vinovo |
| 21:00 CEST | Enzinger 67' | Report | Bonansea 8', 54'; Girelli 64'; Hurtig 90+2' | Stadium: Juventus Training Center; Referee: María Dolores Martínez Madrona (Spain) |

=== Second round ===
| 1 September 2021 First leg | Vilazina (Albania) | 0–2 | (Italy) Juventus | Shkodër |
| 19:00 CEST | | Report | Girelli 12'; Hurtig 44' | Stadium: Reshit Rusi Stadium; Referee: Sabina Bolić (Croatia) |

| 9 September 2021 Second leg | Juventus (Italy) | 1–0 (3–0 agg.) | (Albania) Vilazina | Vinovo |
| 20:00 CEST | Stašková 34' | Report | | Stadium: Juventus Training Center; Referee: Henrikke Nervik (Norway) |

=== Group stage ===
| Pos | Team | Pld | W | D | L | GF | GA | GD | Pts | Qualification | WOL | JUV | CHE | SER |
|---|---|---|---|---|---|---|---|---|---|---|---|---|---|---|
| 1 | (Germany) VfL Wolfsburg | 6 | 3 | 2 | 1 | 17 | 7 | +10 | 11 (Note: Head-to-head points: Wolfsburg 5, Juventus 5, Chelsea 5. Head-to-head goal differences: Wolfsburg +2, Juventus +1, Chelsea −3.) | Advance to Quarter-finals | — | 0–2 | 4–0 | 5–0 |
| 2 | (Italy) Juventus | 6 | 3 | 2 | 1 | 12 | 4 | +8 | 11 | Advance to Quarter-finals | 2–2 | — | 1–2 | 4–0 |
| 3 | (England) Chelsea | 6 | 3 | 2 | 1 | 13 | 8 | +5 | 11 | | 3–3 | 0–0 | — | 1–0 |
| 4 | (Switzerland) Servette Chênois | 6 | 0 | 0 | 6 | 0 | 23 | −23 | 0 | | 0–3 | 0–3 | 0–7 | — |

Source: UEFA
Rules for classification: Group stage tiebreakers
Notes:

| 6 October 2021 1 | Servette (Switzerland) | 0–3 | (Italy) Juventus | Geneva, Switzerland |
| 18:45 CEST | | Report | Caruso 35'; Hurtig 65'; Cernoia 71' | Stadium: Stade de Marignac |

| 13 October 2021 2 | Juventus (Italy) | 1–2 | (England) Chelsea | Turin |
| 21:00 CEST | Bonansea 37' | Report | Cuthbert 31'; Harder 69' | Stadium: Juventus Stadium; Referee: Ivana Martinčić (Croatia) |

| 9 November 2021 3 | Juventus (Italy) | 2–2 | (Germany) Wolfsburg | Turin |
| 20:45 CEST | Girelli 22', 90+3' | Report | Lattwein 25'; Waßmuth 66' | Stadium: Juventus Stadium |

| 18 November 2021 4 | Wolfsburg (Germany) | 0–2 | (Italy) Juventus | Wolfsburg |
| 18:45 CET | | Report | Hendrich 53' (o.g.); Stašková 90+3' | Stadium: AOK Stadium |

| 8 December 2021 5 | Chelsea (England) | 0–0 | (Italy) Juventus | Kingston upon Thames |
| 21:00 (20:00 GMT) | | Report | | Stadium: Kingsmeadow |

| 16 December 2021 6 | Juventus (Italy) | 4–0 | (Switzerland) Servette Chênois | Turin |
| 21:00 CET | Hurtig 12'; Girelli 20' (pen.), 64' (pen.); Bonfantini 90' | Report | | Stadium: Juventus Stadium; Referee: Jelena Cvetković (Serbia) |

=== Quarter-finals ===
| 23 March 2022 First leg | Juventus (Italy) | 2–1 | (France) Lyon | Turin |
| | Girelli 71'; Bonfantini 83' | Report | Macario 8' | Stadium: Juventus Stadium |

| 31 March 2022 Second leg | Lyon (France) | 3–1 (4–3 agg.) | (Italy) Juventus | Décines-Charpieu |
| | Hegerberg 33'; Malard 36'; Macario 73' | Report | Stašková 84' | Stadium: Groupama OL Training Center |

== Supercoppa Italiana ==
| 5 January 2021 Semi-finals | Juventus | 1–1 (4–3 p) | Sassuolo | Frosinone |
| 17:30 CET | Nildén 10' | Report | Clelland 11' | Stadium: Stadio Benito Stirpe |
| | Penalties |
| | Boattin (penalty missed); Gama (penalty scored); Girelli (penalty scored); Bonansea (penalty scored); Junge (penalty scored) | | (penalty scored) Dubcová; (penalty missed) Cantore; (penalty scored) Mihashi; (penalty scored) Clelland; (penalty missed) Philtjens |

| 8 January 2021 Final | AC Milan | 1–2 | Juventus | Frosinone |
| 14:30 CET | Grimshaw 45+1' | Report | Bergamaschi 50' (o.g.); Girelli 87' | Stadium: Stadio Benito Stirpe |

== Statistics ==
As of match played 17 January 2026

| No. | Pos. | Nat. | Player | Serie A | | Champions League | | Total | |
| No. | Pos. | Nat. | Player | Apps | Goals | Apps | Goals | Apps | Goals |
|---|---|---|---|---|---|---|---|---|---|
| 1 | GK | (Italy) | Roberta Aprile | 8 | 0 | 0 | 0 | 0 | 0 |
| 2 | DF | (Finland) | Tuija Hyyrynen | 15+1 | 0 | 0+4 | 0 | 0 | 0 |
| 3 | DF | (Italy) | Sara Gama | 13+2 | 1 | 5 | 0 | 0 | 0 |
| 5 | DF | (Sweden) | Amanda Nildén | 12+6 | 1 | 0+5 | 0 | 0 | 0 |
| 7 | MF | (Italy) | Valentina Cernoia | 14+3 | 6 | 5+1 | 1 | 0 | 0 |
| 8 | MF | (Italy) | Martina Rosucci | 12+8 | 2 | 8 | 0 | 0 | 0 |
| 9 | FW | (Czech Republic) | Andrea Stašková | 9+8 | 5 | 1+7 | 2 | 0 | 0 |
| 10 | FW | (Italy) | Cristiana Girelli | 14+3 | 7 | 7 | 5 | 0 | 0 |
| 11 | FW | (Italy) | Barbara Bonansea | 16+2 | 7 | 6+1 | 1 | 0 | 0 |
| 12 | DF | (Denmark) | Matilde Lundorf Skovsen | 5+11 | 0 | 6+1 | 0 | 0 | 0 |
| 13 | DF | (Italy) | Lisa Boattin | 12+7 | 6 | 8 | 0 | 0 | 0 |
| 14 | MF | (Denmark) | Sofie Junge Pedersen | 12+4 | 3 | 7+1 | 0 | 0 | 0 |
| 15 | MF | (Denmark) | Julia Grosso | 7+2 | 0 | 1 | 0 | 0 | 0 |
| 16 | GK | (France) | Pauline Peyraud-Magnin | 14 | 0 | 8 | 0 | 0 | 0 |
| 17 | GK | (Sweden) | Lina Hurtig | 13+6 | 4 | 7+1 | 2 | 0 | 0 |
| 19 | MF | (France) | Annahita Zamanian | 11+6 | 1 | 2+2 | 0 | 0 | 0 |
| 21 | MF | (Italy) | Arianna Caruso | 15+4 | 8 | 3+5 | 1 | 0 | 0 |
| 22 | FW | (Italy) | Agnese Bonfantini | 7+13 | 3 | 1+7 | 2 | 0 | 0 |
| 23 | DF | (Italy) | Cecilia Salvai | 10+1 | 0 | 6 | 0 | 0 | 0 |
| 24 | FW | (Italy) | Nicole Arcangeli | 0+1 | 0 | 0 | 0 | 0 | 0 |
| 27 | FW | (Italy) | Chiara Beccari | 0+2 | 0 | 0 | 0 | 0 | 0 |
| 29 | MF | (Italy) | Elisa Pfattner | 0+3 | 0 | 0+1 | 0 | 0 | 0 |
| 32 | DF | (Sweden) | Linda Sembrant | 8+1 | 0 | 2 | 0 | 0 | 0 |
| 51 | DF | (Italy) | Vanessa Panzeri | 0+2 | 0 | 0 | 0 | 0 | 0 |
| 71 | DF | (Italy) | Martina Lenzini | 15+4 | 0 | 5+1 | 0 | 0 | 0 |

== See also ==
- 2021–22 Juventus F.C. season
- 2021–22 Juventus F.C. Under-23 season
