= 2020–21 Juventus FC (women) season =

Juventus Women 2020–21 football season

Juventus
2020–21 season
- Chairman: Andrea Agnelli
- Head coach: Rita Guarino
- Stadium: Juventus Training Center
- Serie A: 1st
- Coppa Italia: Semi-finals
- Supercoppa Italiana: Winners
- UEFA Champions League: Round of 32
- Top goalscorer: League: Cristiana Girelli (22); All: Cristiana Girelli (26)
- Biggest win: Juventus–Pink Bari 9–1
- Biggest defeat: Lyon–Juventus 3–0
Home colours	Away colours	Third colours

The 2020–21 season was the 4th season in the existence of Juventus and the club's 4th consecutive season in the top flight of Italian women's football. In addition to the domestic league, Juventus participated in this season's editions of the Coppa Italia, the Supercoppa Italiana, and the UEFA Champions League.

Juventus were eliminated from the Champions League against Lyon, losing 6–2 on aggregate in the round of 32. Juventus were also eliminated from the Coppa Italia against Roma; they drew 4–4 on aggregate in the semi-finals, and were eliminated on the away goals rule.

After beating Roma in the semi-finals of the Supercoppa Italiana, Juventus advanced to the final against Fiorentina, which they won 2–0. On 8 May 2021, Juventus were mathematically confirmed four-time champions of Italy, after beating Napoli 2–0. With its fourth consecutive national title, Juventus equaled the national record of league titles reached by Torres in 2013. They finished the season winning all 22 league matches, becoming the ninth team in the women's top flight to win unbeaten the competition (Note: After, in chronological order, Roma C.F. (1969), Valdobbiadene (1977), Jolly Catania (1978), Lazio CF (1980, 1987–88 and 2001–02), Reggiana (1989–90, 1990–91 and 1992–93), Fiammamonza (2005–06), Bardolino Verona (2008–09) and Torres (2009–10 and 2010–11).) and the first in Italian football history, men or women, to accomplish a perfect season having won all their league matches.

== Pre-season and friendlies ==
=== Overview ===
On 2 August 2020, Juventus played a friendly against Florentia scoring six goals. Florentia's goal was scored by Sofia Cantore in the 68th minute who was loaned from Juventus in this season. On 8 August, they won 4–0 against Servette. Both games were played at home.

Juventus participated in the "Trophée Femenine Veolia", playing two more games against French sides in the Parc Olympique Lyonnais in Lyon. On 13 August, Juventus played their first game of the tournament, a 2–1 victory against Montpellier. Juventus captain Sara Gama gave them the lead through a heel strike in the 44th minute. In the 60th minute, Barbara Bonansea scored in an individual action, and later assisted Andrea Stašková. Eight minutes later, Dutchwoman Anouk Dekker scored the final goal, due to an error from Laura Giuliani. Two days later, Juventus lost 3–0 in the decisive match against Lyon, who won the competition. In the 28th minute, Lyon's captain Wendie Renard scored a goal with a header from a corner kick. Four minutes later, Kadeisha Buchanan doubled the result, with another header from a corner kick. In the 78th minute, Melvine Malard scored the final goal due to an error from Doris Bačić.

=== Matches ===
Results list Juventus' goal tally first.

Date	Opponent	Venue	Result	Scorers
2 August 2020	Florentia	Home	6–1	Pedersen 41', Bonansea 44', Alves (2) 66', 89', Stašková 67', Bonansea 85'
8 August 2020	(Switzerland) Servette	Home	4–0	Stašková 12', Cernoia 30', Girelli 50', Alves 74'
13 August 2020	(France) Montpellier	Neutral	2–1	Gama 44', Stašková 60'
15 August 2020	(France) Lyon	Away	0–3	

== Serie A ==
=== Overview ===
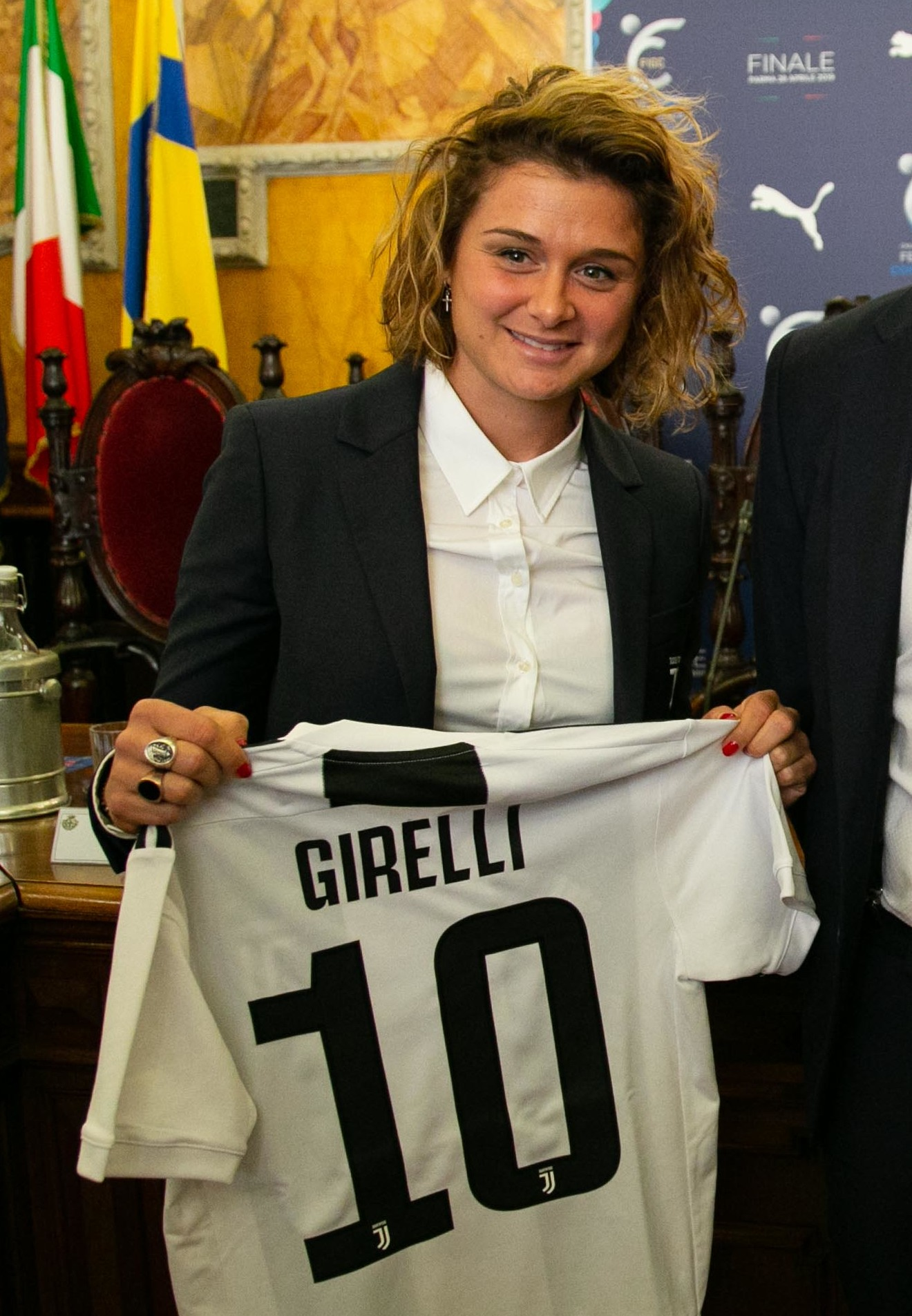
Cristiana Girelli scored 22 goals in the league becoming season's top scorer.

Juventus' first match in this season was on 22 August 2020—a 2–0 away victory over Hellas Verona. Seven days later, Juventus beat Empoli with a result of 4–3. On 6 September, Juventus played their only match that took place in this month and it was a 2–0 home victory. On 5 October, Juventus won 1–0 away to AC Milan with Girelli's penalty kick in the 12th minute. After this match, Juventus played other two matches, both won 4–0 against Fiorentina and Pink Bari, which played with 10 players due to Louise Quinn's red card in the 12th minute. Juventus' first match in November was a 4–0 victory against Sassuolo. They also played another match in November; it was a 2–1 victory against Florentia. With the aforementioned victory, Juventus was the first team to make 18 consecutive victories in the women's Serie A. On December, Juventus played two matches: a 2–1 victory against Napoli and a 4–1 win over Roma. Juventus' games in January were a 3–0 victory against Inter Milan and a 5–0 win over Hellas Verona. In February, Juventus won 3–0 against Empoli and 3–1 against San Marino. On 7 March, Juventus won 4–0 against AC Milan. On 20 March, they won 2–1 against Fiorentina. Eight days later, Juventus won 9–1 against Pink Bari. On 18 April, Juventus won their only match played in this month, with a 3–0 victory over Sassuolo. In May, they played and won four matches: 6–1 against Florentia, 2–0 over Napoli, 1–0 against Roma and 5–0 over Inter Milan.

=== Matches ===
Results list Juventus' goal tally first.

Date	Opponent	Venue	Result	Scorers
22 August 2020	Hellas Verona	Away	2–0	Girelli 53', Galli 56'
29 August 2020	Empoli	Home	4–3	Bonansea (2) 13', 54', Girelli (2) 54' (pen.), 90+4' (pen.)
6 September 2020	San Marino	Home	2–0	Girelli 71', Caruso 82'
5 October 2020	AC Milan	Away	1–0	Girelli 12' (pen.)
11 October 2020	Fiorentina	Home	4–0	Girelli 4', Alves 15', Bonansea 66', Hurtig 80'
18 October 2020	Pink Bari	Away	4–0	Caruso 15', Girelli 25', Cernoia 35', Stašková 84'
8 November 2020	Sassuolo	Home	4–0	Sembrant 57', Caruso 69', Cernoia 84', Zamanian 89'
14 November 2020	Florentia	Away	2–1	Caruso 54', Girelli 57' (pen.)
5 December 2020	Napoli	Away	2–1	Alves 60', Girelli 82' (pen.)
12 December 2020	Roma	Home	4–1	Girelli (2) 12', 36', Sembrant 25', Hurtig 89'
17 January 2021	Inter Milan	Away	3–0	Girelli 54' (pen.), Galli 68', Pedersen 87'
24 January 2021	Hellas Verona	Home	5–0	Hurtig 13', Pedersen 26', Girelli 31' (pen.), Bonansea 39', Zamanian 89'
6 February 2021	Empoli	Away	3–0	Girelli (2) 27', 63', Hurtig 57'
28 February 2021	San Marino	Away	3–1	Montaiti 13' (o.g.), Hurtig 66', Girelli 89'
7 March 2021	AC Milan	Home	4–0	Bonansea 8', Hurtig 26', Stašková 83', Caruso 90'+2'
20 March 2021	Fiorentina	Away	2–1	Stašková (2) 13', 44'
28 March 2021	Pink Bari	Home	9–1	Hurtig 11', Sembrant 21', Enlid 56' (o.g.), Girelli (4) 63', 69', 72', 87', Stašková 66', Salvai 81'
18 April 2021	Sassuolo	Away	3–0	Cernoia (2) 42' (pen.), 47', Alves 77'
2 May 2021	Florentia	Home	6–1	Skovsen 6', Pedersen 30', Cernoia 42', Stašková (2) 61', 68', Bonansea 71'
8 May 2021	Napoli	Home	2–0	Girelli 19', Bonansea 29'
16 May 2021	Roma	Away	1–0	Bonansea 52'
23 May 2021	Inter Milan	Home	5–0	Gama 4', Girelli 5', Caruso 11', Hyyrynen 19', Stašková 74'

=== League table ===
Pos	Team	Pld	W	D	L	GF	GA	GD	Pts	Qualification or relegation
1	Juventus (C)	22	22	0	0	75	10	+65	66	Qualification to Champions League first round
2	Milan	22	16	3	3	47	17	+30	51	Qualification to Champions League first round
3	Sassuolo	22	16	2	4	47	20	+27	50	
4	Fiorentina	22	12	2	8	40	30	+10	38	
5	Roma	22	10	7	5	35	25	+10	37	

Source: FIGC (fixtures, ranking)
Rules for classification: 1) Points; 2) Head-to-head points; 3) Head-to-head goal difference; 4) Goal difference; 5) Goals scored; 6) Draw
(C) Champions

== Coppa Italia ==
=== Overview ===
Juventus were drawn into a three-team group to play against Pink Bari and Pomigliano. Juventus did not play on Matchday 1. Juventus were due to play on Matchday 2 against Pomigliano on 19–20 October 2020, but due to players testing positive for COVID-19, the match was postponed to 19 November. However, on 16 November the match was postponed again to 13 January 2021. On 22 November, Juventus won 4–1 against Pink Bari. On 13 January 2021, Juventus won 5–1 on Matchday 2 against Pomigliano, advancing to the quarter-finals. On 30 January, Juventus won with a spectacular result of 5–4 the first leg of the quarter-finals over Empoli, in which the three goal scored by Benedetta Glionna for the opponents were from a free-kick. On 13 February, Juventus won the second leg with a 5–0 victory qualifying to the semi-finals winning 10–4 on aggregate. On 13 March, Juventus lost 2–1 in the first leg over Roma. Despite the 3–2 victory in the second leg, on 25 April, Juventus drew 4–4 on aggregate, being eliminated due to the away-goals rule.

=== Matches ===
Results list Juventus' goal tally first.

Date	Round	Opponent	Venue	Result	Scorers
22 November 2020	Matchday 3	Pink Bari	Away	4–1	Cernoia 32', Stašková (2) 52', 90', Ippólito 67', Alves 84'
13 January 2021 (Note: The match was postponed from the main date of the competition (19–20 November 2020).)	Matchday 2	Pomigliano	Away	5–1	Bonansea (2) 4', 61', Alves 7', Zamanian 13'
30 January 2021	Quarter-final	Empoli	Away	5–4	Boattin 41', Zamanian 68', Stašková 77', Girelli 78', Salvai 88'
13 February 2021	Quarter-final	Empoli	Home	5–0	Bonansea 21', Girelli 30', Sembrant 60', Stašková (2) 79' 89'
13 March 2021	Semi-final	Roma	Away	1–2	Hurtig 49'
25 April 2021	Semi-final	Roma	Home	3–2	Pedersen 18', Girelli 90'+2', Gama 90'+6'

== Supercoppa Italiana ==
=== Overview ===
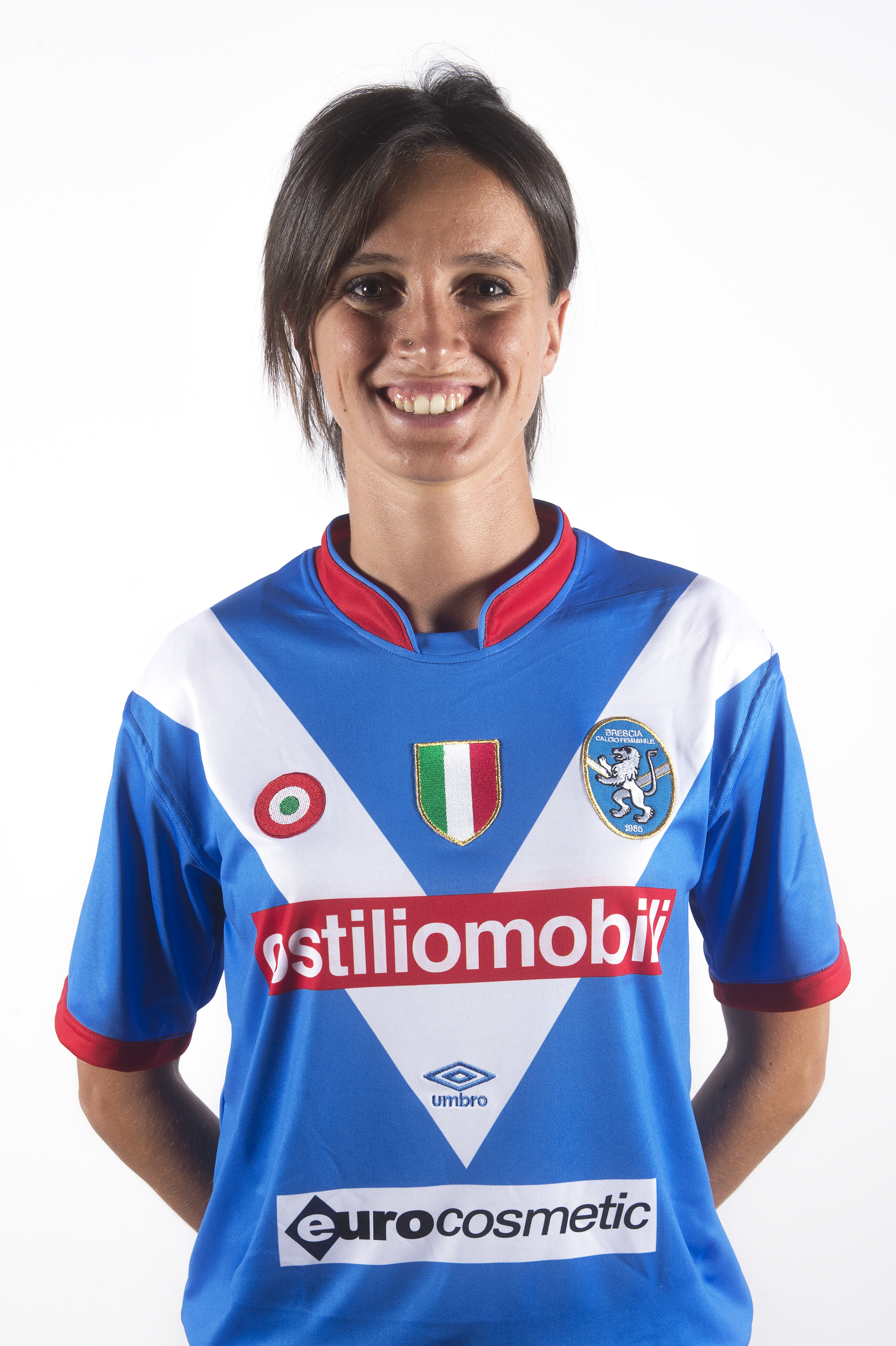
Barbara Bonansea scored the decisive brace in the final.

Since Juventus was one of the top four teams of the previous league season, they qualified for the Supercoppa Italiana. The format of the competition was changed, increasing the number of teams participating in the competition from two to four, playing the semi-finals and final at the Stadio Comunale, Chiavari. Juventus played the semi-finals on 6 January 2021 against Roma, which was beaten 2–1 after extra-time through Bonansea and Girelli's goals. On 10 January, Juventus played the final against Fiorentina, winning 2–0 with a Barbara Bonansea brace. This victory was Juventus' second trophy after the one won in the previous season.

=== Matches ===
Results list Juventus' goal tally first.

Date	Round	Opponent	Venue	Result	Scorers
6 January 2021	Semi-final	Roma	Neutral (Note: Juventus played the match at home formally.)	2–1 (a.e.t.)	Bonansea 23', Girelli 116'
10 January 2021	Final	Fiorentina	Neutral	2–0	Bonansea (2) 39', 55'

== Champions League ==
=== Overview ===
Since Juventus won the league in the previous season, they qualified for the round of 32 of the competition. On 24 November 2020, Juventus was drawn to play against Lyon. On 9 December, Juventus was beaten by Lyon 3–2 in the first leg at home, despite Hurtig's goal and an own goal. Six days later, Juventus lost the second leg 3–0 away. Lyon won the tie 5–3 on aggregate.

=== Matches ===
Results list Juventus' goal tally first.

Date	Round	Opponent	Venue	Result	Scorers
9 December 2020	Round of 32	(France) Lyon	Home	2–3	Hurtig 16', Buchanan 38' (o.g.)
15 December 2020	Round of 32	(France) Lyon	Away	0–3	

== Player details ==
As of 23 May 2021

No.	Pos	Nat	Player	Total		Serie A		Coppa Italia		Supercoppa Italiana		Champions League	
No.	Pos	Nat	Player	Apps	Goals	Apps	Goals	Apps	Goals	Apps	Goals	Apps	Goals
1	GK	(Italy) ITA	Laura Giuliani	24	0	19	0	3	0	1	0	1	0
2	DF	(Finland) FIN	Tuija Hyyrynen	22	1	12+2	1	4	0	2	0	2	0
3	DF	(Italy) ITA	Sara Gama	17	2	9+1	1	3+1	1	1	0	2	0
4	MF	(Italy) ITA	Aurora Galli	17	1	10+2	1	1	0	2	0	2	0
5	MF	(Argentina) ARG	Dalila Ippólito	6	1	0+4	0	1+1	1	0	0	0	0
7	MF	(Italy) ITA	Valentina Cernoia	23	7	10+5	6	4+1	1	0+1	0	2	0
8	MF	(Italy) ITA	Martina Rosucci	26	0	16+2	0	4+1	0	1+1	0	0+1	0
9	MF	(Czech Republic) CZE	Andrea Stašková	31	12	8+13	7	3+3	5	0+2	0	0+2	0
10	FW	(Italy) ITA	Cristiana Girelli	28	26	19+1	22	3+1	3	2	1	2	0
11	MF	(Italy) ITA	Barbara Bonansea	26	13	17+1	8	3+1	2	2	3	1+1	0
12	DF	(Denmark) DEN	Matilde Lundorf Skovsen	25	1	12+7	1	3+2	0	0+1	0	0	0
13	DF	(Italy) ITA	Lisa Boattin	30	1	21	0	5	1	2	0	2	0
14	MF	(Denmark) DEN	Sofie Junge Pedersen	18	4	11+2	3	3	1	1+1	0	0	0
17	MF	(Sweden) SWE	Lina Hurtig	22	8	8+6	6	3+1	1	2	0	2	1
19	FW	(France) FRA	Annahita Zamanian	24	4	7+11	2	3+1	2	0+1	0	0+1	0
20	DF	(Brazil) BRA	Maria Alves	23	5	5+9	3	4+2	2	0+1	0	0+2	0
21	MF	(Italy) ITA	Arianna Caruso	28	6	15+5	6	4	0	2	0	2	0
23	DF	(Italy) ITA	Cecilia Salvai	19	2	14	1	2	1	2	0	1	0
24	DF	(Malta) MLT	Nicole Sciberras	0	0	0	0	0	0	0	0	0	0
25	MF	(Italy) ITA	Kristin Carrer	0	0	0	0	0	0	0	0	0	0
26	DF	(Italy) ITA	Sara Caiazzo	3	0	0+1	0	1+1	0	0	0	0	0
27	MF	(Italy) ITA	Alice Giai	3	0	0+1	0	0+2	0	0	0	0	0
29	FW	(Italy) ITA	Nicole Arcangeli	0	0	0	0	0	0	0	0	0	0
32	DF	(Sweden) SWE	Linda Sembrant	21	7	17+1	3	3	2	0	2	0	0
33	FW	(Italy) ITA	Michela Giordano	8	0	0+5	0	1+2	0	0	0	0	0
42	GK	(Croatia) CRO	Doris Bačić	9	0	3+2	0	2	0	1	0	1	0
46	GK	(Italy) ITA	Sabrina Tasselli	2	0	0	0	1	0	0	0	1	0
99	FW	(Italy) ITA	Ilaria Berti	11	0	0+9	0	1+1	0	0	0	0	0

== Transfers ==
=== Summer ===
==== In ====
Purchases
Date	Pos.	Name	From	Type	Fee	Ref.
7 July 2020	DF	(Denmark) Matilde Lundorf Skovsen	(England) Brighton & Hove	Free transfer	N/A	
19 August 2020	MF	(Argentina) Dalila Ippólito	(Argentina) UAI Urquiza	Free transfer	N/A	
1 July 2020	DF	(Italy) Martina Lenzini	Sassuolo	End of loan	N/A	
1 July 2020	MF	(Italy) Valentina Puglisi	Tavagnacco	End of loan	N/A	
1 July 2020	FW	(Italy) Sofia Cantore	Verona	End of loan	N/A	
1 July 2020	FW	(Italy) Benedetta Glionna	Verona	Free transfer	N/A	
1 July 2020	FW	(Sweden) Lina Hurtig	(Sweden) Linköpings FC	Free transfer	N/A	
Other transfers
Date	Pos.	Name	From	Type	Fee	Ref.
1 July 2020	DF	(Italy) Paola Boglioni	Empoli	End of loan	N/A	
1 July 2020	FW	(Italy) Federica Anghileri	Empoli	End of loan	N/A	

==== Out ====
Sales
Date	Pos.	Name	To	Type	Fee	Ref.
1 July 2020	DF	(Italy) Michela Franco	Released (Note: Joined Como in January 2021.)		N/A	
1 July 2020	DF	(Italy) Martina Lenzini	Sassuolo	On loan	N/A	
1 July 2020	MF	(Italy) Melissa Bellucci	Empoli	On loan	N/A	
1 July 2020	MF	(Italy) Valentina Puglisi	Tavagnacco	On loan	N/A	
1 July 2020	MF	(Poland) Aleksandra Sikora	Released (Note: Joined Klepp in the summer 2020.)		N/A	
1 July 2020	FW	(Italy) Asia Bragonzi	Verona	On loan	N/A	
1 July 2020	FW	(Italy) Sofia Cantore	Verona	On loan	N/A	
1 July 2020	FW	(Italy) Benedetta Glionna	Verona	On loan	N/A	
Other transfers
Date	Pos.	Name	To	Type	Fee	Ref.
1 July 2020	GK	(Italy) Beatrice Beretta	Tavagnacco	On loan	N/A	
1 July 2020	DF	(Italy) Beatrice Airola	Orobica	On loan	N/A	
1 July 2020	DF	(Italy) Paola Boglioni	Florentia	On loan	N/A	
1 July 2020	DF	(Italy) Margherita Brscic	Empoli	On loan	N/A	
1 July 2020	DF	(Italy) Carlotta Masu	Cittadella	On loan	N/A	
1 July 2020	DF	(Italy) Martina Toniolo	Empoli	On loan	N/A	
1 July 2020	MF	(Italy) Ludovica Silvioni	Pink Bari	On loan	N/A	
1 July 2020	FW	(Italy) Federica Anghileri	Florentia	On loan	N/A	
1 July 2020	FW	(Italy) Flavia Devoto	Tavagnacco	On loan	N/A	

== See also ==
- 2020–21 Juventus F.C. season
- 2020–21 Juventus F.C. Under-23 season
- List of unbeaten football club seasons
