= 2020–21 Coppa Italia (women) =

Football tournament season

2020–21 Italian Women's Cup
Tournament details
- Dates: 6 September 2020– 30 May 2021
- Teams: 24 + 2 (in preliminary round)

Final positions
- Champions: Roma
- Runners-up: Milan

Tournament statistics
- Matches played: 37 + 4
- Goals scored: 141 (7.81 per match)
- All statistics correct as of 30 May 2021.

The 2020–21 Italian Women's Cup (Coppa Italia di calcio femminile) was the 48th edition of the Italian women's football national cup. Juventus were the defending champions from the 2018–19 season as the 2019–20 edition was not held due to the COVID-19 pandemic. The 2021 Coppa Italia was won by current holders Roma after beating Milan on penalties in the final.

== Format ==
The competition is contested by 24 teams at the group stage by the 12 Serie A and the top 10 Serie B clubs, a preliminary round was held for the bottom four Serie B teams (3 actually promoted from the Primavera plus the lowest ranked Serie B team in the 2019–20 season) to decide the remaining two teams in the group stages.

The top team from each group qualifies to the knockout stage.

== Calendar ==
Below are the dates for each round as given by the official schedule:

Matchday	Date	Number of fixtures	Clubs
	Preliminary round		
First leg	2 September 2020	2	4 → 2
Second leg	6 September 2020	2	4 → 2
	Group stage		
Matchday 1	26 & 27 September 2020	8 (Note: Matches were scheduled to be played on 1 November and 22 November 2020 but some matches were played outside the scheduled dates.)	24 →8
Matchday 2	1 November 2020	8	24 →8
Matchday 3	22 November 2020	8	24 →8
	Knockout stage		
	Quarter-finals		
First leg	30 & 31 January 2021	4	8 → 4
Second leg	13 & 14 February 2021	4	8 → 4
	Semi-finals		
First leg	13 & 14 March 2021	2	4 →2
Second leg	24 & 25 April 2021	2	4 →2
	Final		
30 May 2021		1	2 →1

== Preliminary round ==
Team 1	Agg.	Team 2	1st leg	2nd leg
Città di Pontedera	4–1	Perugia	1–0	3–1
Vicenza	1–4	Brescia	0–3	1–1

== Group stage ==
=== Group A ===
Pos	Team	Pld	W	D	L	GF	GA	GD	Pts	Qualification
1	Florentia (Q)	2	2	0	0	5	0	+5	6	Advance to Quarter-finals
2	Hellas Verona	2	1	0	1	2	1	+1	3	
3	Lady Granata	2	0	0	2	0	6	−6	0	

Source: FIGC
(Q) Qualified

Home \ Away	CIT	FLO	VER
Lady Granata	—	0–4	0–2
Florentia	—	—	—
Hellas Verona	—	0–1	—

Source: FIGC femminile

=== Group B ===
Pos	Team	Pld	W	D	L	GF	GA	GD	Pts	Qualification
1	Inter Milan (Q)	2	1	1	0	7	3	+4	4 (Note: Ranked on goal difference: Inter Milan +4, Lazio +2.)	Advance to Quarter-finals
2	Lazio	2	1	1	0	6	4	+2	4	
3	Brescia	2	0	0	2	1	7	−6	0	

Source: FIGC
(Q) Qualified
Notes:

Home \ Away	BRE	INT	LAZ
Brescia	—	0–4	1–3
Inter Milan	—	—	—
Lazio	—	3–3	—

Source: FIGC femminile

=== Group C ===
Pos	Team	Pld	W	D	L	GF	GA	GD	Pts	Qualification
1	Fiorentina (Q)	2	2	0	0	11	2	+9	6	Advance to Quarter-finals
2	San Marino Academy	2	1	0	1	5	8	−3	3	
3	ASD Riozzese	2	0	0	2	4	10	−6	0	

Source: FIGC
(Q) Qualified

Home \ Away	FIO	RIO	SMA
Fiorentina	—	—	—
ASD Riozzese	1–6	—	3–4
San Marino Academy	1–5	—	—

Source: FIGC femminile

=== Group D ===
Pos	Team	Pld	W	D	L	GF	GA	GD	Pts	Qualification
1	Empoli (Q)	2	2	0	0	8	2	+6	6	Advance to Quarter-finals
2	Ravenna	2	1	0	1	4	5	−1	3	
3	Chievo Verona	2	0	0	2	1	6	−5	0	

Source: FIGC
(Q) Qualified

Home \ Away	EMP	RAV	VER
Empoli	—	—	—
Ravenna	2–4	—	—
Chievo Verona	0–4	1–2	—

Source: FIGC femminile

=== Group E ===
Pos	Team	Pld	W	D	L	GF	GA	GD	Pts	Qualification
1	Juventus (Q)	2	2	0	0	9	2	+7	6	Advance to Quarter-finals
2	Bari	2	0	1	1	2	5	−3	1 (Note: Ranked on goal difference: Bari -3, Pomigliano -4.)	
3	Pomigliano	2	0	1	1	2	6	−4	1	

Source: FIGC
(Q) Qualified
Notes:

Home \ Away	BAR	JUV	POM
Bari	—	1–4	—
Juventus	—	—	—
Pomigliano	1–1	1–5	—

Source: FIGC femminile

=== Group F ===
Pos	Team	Pld	W	D	L	GF	GA	GD	Pts	Qualification
1	Milan (Q)	2	2	0	0	6	0	+6	6	Advance to Quarter-finals
2	Orobica	2	1	0	1	1	4	−3	3	
3	Cesena	2	0	0	2	0	3	−3	0	

Source: FIGC
(Q) Qualified

Home \ Away	CES	MIL	ORO
Cesena	—	0–2	0–1
Milan	—	—	—
Orobica	—	0–4	—

Source: FIGC femminile

=== Group G ===
Pos	Team	Pld	W	D	L	GF	GA	GD	Pts	Qualification
1	Sassuolo (Q)	2	1	1	0	5	3	+2	4 (Note: Ranked on goal difference: Sassuolo +2, Napoli +1.)	Advance to Quarter-finals
2	Napoli	2	1	1	0	2	1	+1	4	
3	Città di Pontedera	2	0	0	2	2	5	−3	0	

Source: FIGC
(Q) Qualified
Notes:

Home \ Away	NAP	PON	SAS
Napoli	—	—	1–1
Città di Pontedera	0–1	—	2–4
Sassuolo	—	—	—

Source: FIGC femminile

=== Group H ===
Pos	Team	Pld	W	D	L	GF	GA	GD	Pts	Qualification
1	AS Roma (Q)	2	2	0	0	12	0	+12	6	Advance to Quarter-finals
2	Roma	2	1	0	1	2	7	−5	3	
3	Tavagnacco	2	0	0	2	0	7	−7	0	

Source: FIGC
(Q) Qualified

Home \ Away	ASR	ROM	TAV
AS Roma	—	—	—
Roma	0–7	—	2–0
Tavagnacco	0–5	—	—

Source: FIGC femminile

== Knockout stage ==
=== Bracket ===
Quarter-finals
Florentia	0	1	1
Roma	4	6	10
Empoli	4	0	4
Juventus	5	5	10
Internazionale	2	0	2
Fiorentina	0	1	1
Sassuolo	1	0	1
Milan (a)	1	0	1

Semi-finals
Roma (a)	2	2	4
Juventus	1	3	4
Internazionale	2	2	4
Milan	1	4	5

Final
Roma	0 (3)
Milan (a.e.t.)	0 (1)

=== Quarter-finals ===
Team 1	Agg.	Team 2	1st leg	2nd leg
Empoli	4–10	Juventus	4–5	0–5
Internazionale	2–1	Fiorentina	2–0	0–1
Sassuolo	1–1(a)	Milan	1–1	0–0
Florentia	1–10	Roma	0–4	1–6

==== First leg ====
30 January 2021	Empoli	4–5	Juventus	Empoli
14:30 CET	Glionna 37', 43', 48'; Dompig 73'	Report	Boattin 41'; Zamanian 68'; Stašková 77'; Girelli 78'; Salvai 87'	Stadium: Centro Sportivo Monteboro

30 January 2021	Internazionale	2–0	Fiorentina	Milan
14:30 CET	Bartoňová 27'; Møller 42'	Report		Stadium: Centro Sportivo Giacinto Facchetti

31 January 2021	Sassuolo	1–1	Milan	Sassuolo
14:30 CET	Philtjens 90+2'	Report	Giacinti 44'	Stadium: Stadio Enzo Ricci

31 January 2021	Florentia	0–4	Roma	Assemini
14:30 CET		Report	Lázaro 10', 31'; Serturini 45'; Andressa 48'	Stadium: Stadio Comunale Santa Lucia

==== Second leg ====
13 February 2021	Juventus	5–0 (10–4 agg.)	Empoli	Juventus Training Center, Vinovo
12:30	Bonansea 21'; Girelli 30'; Sembrant 60'; Stašková 79', 89'	Report

13 February 2021	Milan	0–0 (1–1 agg.)	Sassuolo	Centro Sportivo Peppino Vismara, Milan
14:30		Report

14 February 2021	Fiorentina	1–0 (1–2 agg.)	Internazionale	Stadio Artemio Franchi, Florence
12:30	Quinn 38'	Report

14 February 2021	Roma	6–1 (10–1 agg.)	Florentia	Stadio delle Tre Fontane, Rome
14:30	Andressa 2' (pen.); Bonfantini 9', 24'; Thomas 33'; Serturini 41'; Severini 75'	Report	Cantore 13'

=== Semi-finals ===
Team 1	Agg.	Team 2	1st leg	2nd leg
Roma	4–4 (a)	Juventus	2–1	2–3
Internazionale	4–5	Milan	2–1	2–4

==== First leg ====
13 March 2021	Roma	2–1	Juventus	Rome
12:30 (CET)	Serturini 2'; Thomas 88'	Report	Hurtig 49'	Stadium: Stadio delle Tre Fontane; Referee: Daniel Rutella

14 March 2021	Internazionale	2–1	Milan	Sesto San Giovanni
12:30 (CET)	Rincón (penalty missed); Marinelli 5' (pen.); Møller 12'	Report	Giacinti 14'	Stadium: Stadio Breda; Referee: Paolo Ricci

==== Second leg ====
24 April 2021	Milan	4–2 (5–4 agg.)	Internazionale	Milan
11:30 (CET)	Boquete 8', 14'; Dowie 79', 86'	Report	Marinelli 60'; Møller 90+1'	Stadium: Centro Sportivo Peppino Vismara; Referee: Maria Ferrieri

25 April 2021	Juventus	3–2 (4–4 agg.)	Roma	Vinovo
11:30 (CET)	Junge Pedersen 18'; Girelli 90+2'; Gama 90+6'	Report	Thomas 77'; Lázaro 82'	Stadium: Juventus Training Center; Referee: Andrea Colombo

=== Final ===
30 May 2021

Roma	0–0 (a.e.t.)	Milan
	Report
Penalties
Giugliano (penalty scored); Serturini (penalty scored); Linari (penalty missed); Bernauer (penalty scored)	3–1	Boquete (penalty missed); Agard (penalty scored); Grimshaw (penalty missed); Tucceri Cimini (penalty missed)

Mapei Stadium, Reggio Emilia
Referee: Maria Marotta
