= Pauline Peyraud-Magnin =

French footballer (born 1992)

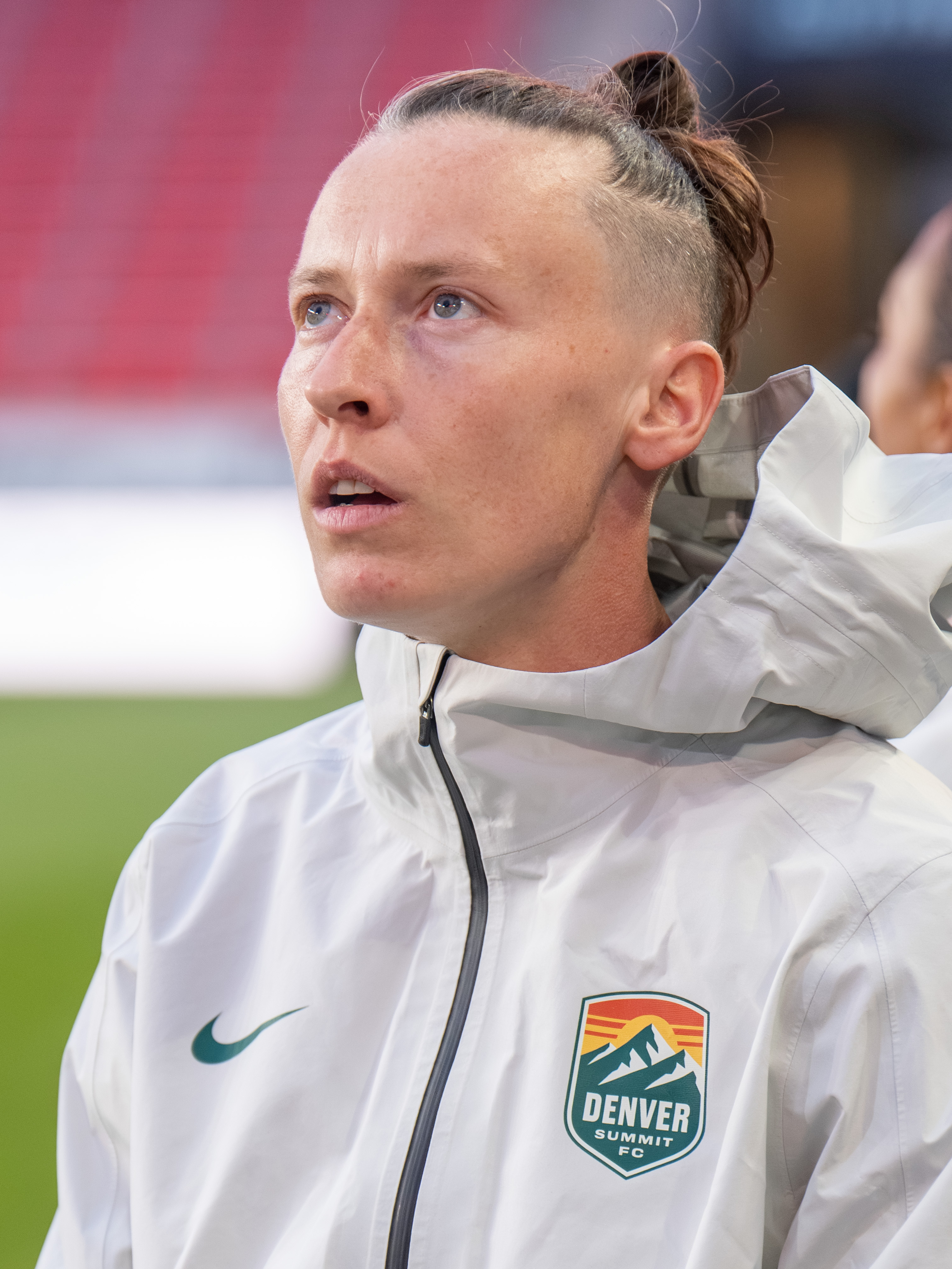
- Peyraud-Magnin with the Denver Summit in 2026

Personal information
- Full name: Pauline Camille Peyraud-Magnin
- Date of birth: 17 March 1992 (age 34)
- Place of birth: Lyon, France
- Height: 1.73 m (5 ft 8 in)
- Position: Goalkeeper

Team information
- Current team: Crystal Palace (on loan from Denver Summit)
- Number: 26

Youth career
- 2003–2004: Caluire SC
- 2004–2005: US Montanay
- 2005–2011: Lyon

Senior career*
| Years | Team | Apps | (Gls) |
| 2011–2014 | Lyon | 5 | (0) |
| 2014–2015 | Issy | 16 | (0) |
| 2015–2016 | Saint-Étienne | 16 | (0) |
| 2016–2017 | Marseille | 19 | (0) |
| 2017–2018 | Lyon | 1 | (0) |
| 2018–2020 | Arsenal | 16 | (0) |
| 2020–2021 | Atlético Madrid | 21 | (0) |
| 2021–2026 | Juventus | 79 | (0) |
| 2026– | Denver Summit | 0 | (0) |
| 2026– | → Crystal Palace (loan) | 0 | (0) |

International career^{‡}
| 2009 | France U17 | 6 | (0) |
| 2010–2011 | France U19 | 6 | (0) |
| 2010 | France U20 | 1 | (0) |
| 2017–2018 | France U23 | 4 | (0) |
| 2019– | France | 77 | (0) |
Medal record
Women's football
Representing France
UEFA Women's Nations League
| Runner-up | 2024 |
| Third place | 2025 |
- * Club domestic league appearances and goals as of 16:24, 5 August 2026 (UTC) ‡ National team caps and goals as of 10 October 2026

Pauline Camille Peyraud-Magnin (born 17 March 1992) is a French professional footballer who plays as a goalkeeper for Women's Super League club Crystal Palace, on loan from Denver Summit FC of the National Women's Soccer League (NWSL), and the France national team.

== Club career ==
Peyraud-Magnin had two spells with Lyon in the D1 Féminine, the top division of football in France, in between that she had spells with Issy, Saint-Étienne and Marseille. After three league titles with Lyon, English club Arsenal signed the player for an undisclosed fee and contract length in July 2018. Her first appearance for them was on the opening day of the season, keeping a clean sheet in a 5–0 win over Liverpool on 9 September.

On 1 July 2020, Peyraud-Magnin was announced at Atlético Madrid on a two-year contract.

On 2 July 2021, Peyraud-Magnin joined Juventus.

In February 2026, NWSL expansion club Denver Summit FC signed Peyraud-Magnin to a two-year contract ahead of the Summit's inaugural season of play.

On 5 July 2026, after not having made any appearances for Denver, Peyraud-Magnin was loaned to newly promoted Women's Super League club Crystal Palace through the 2026–27 season.

== International career ==
Peyraud-Magnin was called up to the France squad for the 2019 FIFA Women's World Cup.

On 30 May 2022, Peyraud-Magnin was called up to the France squad for the UEFA Women's Euro 2022.

Peyraud-Magnin was called up to the France squad for the 2023 FIFA Women's World Cup.

In July 2024, Peyraud-Magnin was named in France's squad for the 2024 Olympics.

== Personal life ==
She came out as lesbian in October 2020.

== Career statistics ==
As of match played 10 October 2026

Appearances and goals by national team and year
| National team | Year | Apps | Goals |
|---|---|---|---|
| France | 2019 | 3 | 0 |
| France | 2020 | 7 | 0 |
| France | 2021 | 11 | 0 |
| France | 2022 | 15 | 0 |
| France | 2023 | 11 | 0 |
| France | 2024 | 11 | 0 |
| France | 2025 | 15 | 0 |
| France | 2026 | 4 | 0 |
| Total | | 77 | 0 |

== Honours ==
Juventus

- Serie A: 2021–22
- Coppa Italia: 2021–22, 2024–25
- Serie A Women's Cup: 2025
- Supercoppa Italiana: 2021–22

=== Lyon ===
- UEFA Women's Champions League: 2017–18
