= Agnese Bonfantini =

Italian footballer (born 1999)

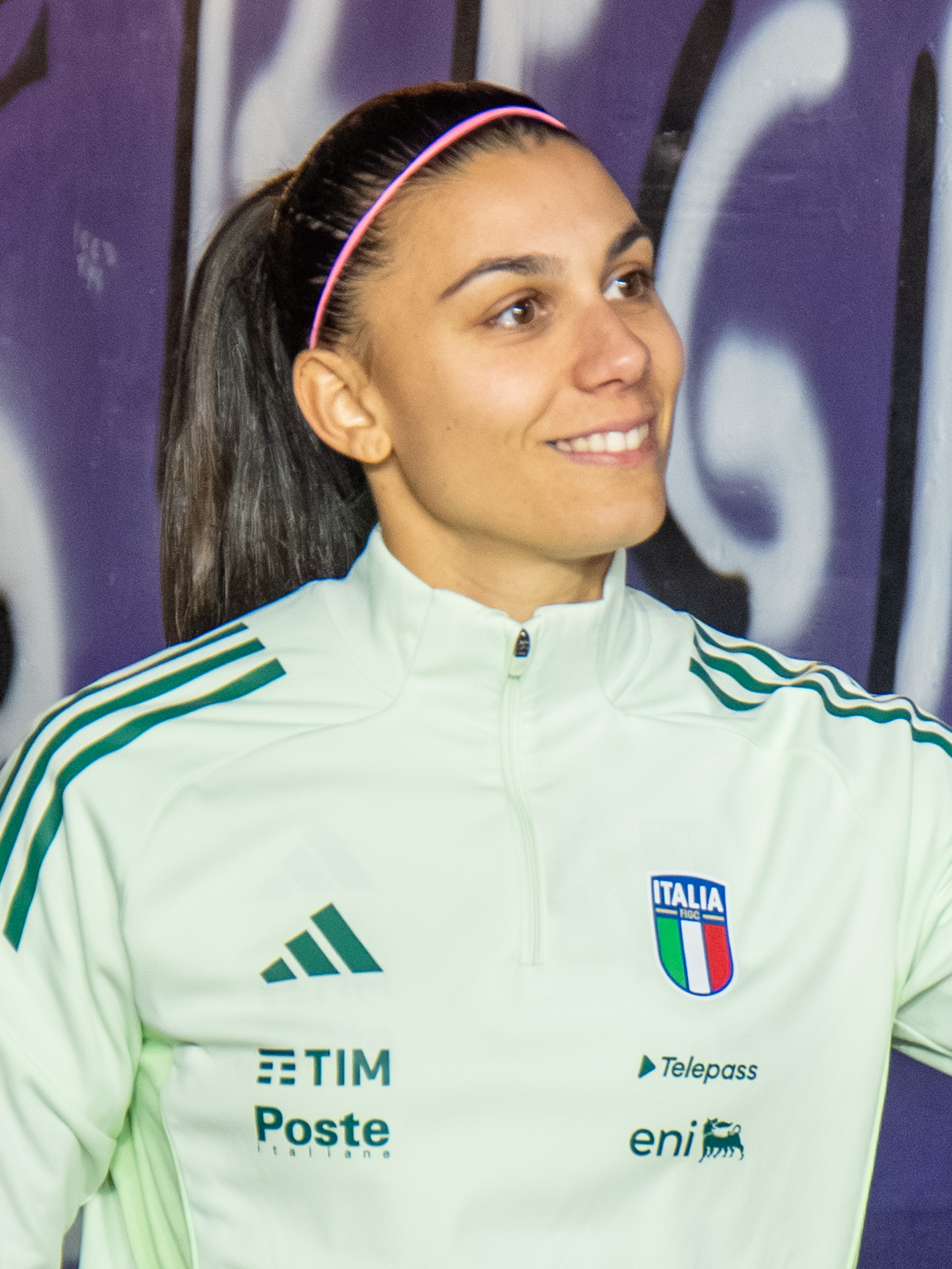
- Bonfantini with Italy in 2025

Personal information
- Date of birth: 4 July 1999 (age 27)
- Place of birth: Verbania, Italy
- Height: 1.70 m (5 ft 7 in)
- Positions: Forward; winger

Team information
- Current team: Como 1907
- Number: 4

Youth career
- 2007–2010: Fondotoce
- 2010–2012: Gravellona Toce
- 2012–2018: Inter Milan

Senior career*
Years	Team	Apps	(Gls)
2018–2021	Roma	56	(12)
2021–2025	Juventus	33	(4)
2023	→ Sampdoria (loan)	11	(7)
2023–2024	→ Inter Milan (loan)	23	(8)
2024–2025	→ Fiorentina (loan)	24	(7)
2025–2026	Fiorentina	17	(0)
2026–	Como 1907	0	(0)

International career^{‡}
2017–2018	Italy U19	8	(7)
2019	Italy U23	1	(1)
2019–	Italy	27	(3)
- * Club domestic league appearances and goals as of 3 October 2026 (UTC) ‡ National team caps and goals as of 3 October 2026

Agnese Bonfantini (born 4 July 1999) is an Italian professional footballer who plays as a forward for Serie A club Como 1907, and the Italy women's national team.

== Club career ==
Bonfantini began playing youth football with Piedmont-based club Fondotoce when Bonfantini was six years old. She began playing in inter-gender training games with the Fondotoce boys' team, and continued her inter-gender tutelage when she transferred to Gravellona Toce in 2010. Her first move away from her native Turin came when she accepted a move to the youth ranks of Inter Milano in 2012, where she would spend the next six years of her career.

Bonfantini would alternate her appearances between Inter's Primavera and senior sides. She made her senior debut for Inter when she was sixteen years old, on 16 April 2015. This was her first senior start for the club on the last matchday of the 2014–15 Serie B season. Despite her long-term service to the club, Bonfantini never managed to help Inter to achieve promotion to Serie A. She eventually transferred to newly-formed, top-flight club A.S. Roma in the summer of 2018, giving her the chance to make her Serie A debut.

Bonfantini was selected for Roma's first eleven in the club's very first league game of their history, away to Sassuolo on 22 September 2018. She helped Roma score the first goal in the club's history by winning the penalty that Roma teammate Annamaria Serturini scored on the day.

On 15 February 2020, Bonfantini became the first woman in A.S. Roma's history to score a hat-trick for the club when she scored three goals against Hellas Verona in 47 minutes of play. In the 2020–21 season, Bonfantini came off the bench in the 30 May 2021 Coppa Italia final to help Roma defeat AC Milan and win their first major trophy as a club.

On 5 July 2021, Bonfantini joined Juventus.

On 5 August 2023, Bonfantini joined Inter Milan on loan from Juventus until 30 June 2024.

On 22 July 2024, Bonfantini joined Fiorentina on loan from Juventus until 30 June 2025.

On 17 July 2026, Bonfantini joined Como 1907.

== International career ==
Bonfantini scored two goals on her Italy U-19 debut against Moldova on 16 October 2017. Italy won that game 8–0. On 5 April 2018, Bonfantini scored a backheel goal against Scotland for Italy U-17, and her performance helped her country qualify for the EURO U-19 tournament.

In 2019, Bonfantini made her senior debut with Italy in a 3–0 victory over Hungary.

On 26 June 2022, Giuliani was announced in the Italy squad for the UEFA Women's Euro 2022.

== Style of play ==
Bonfantini had described her approach to the game as one where "when I see a through ball, I run. I only see the penalty box and run.” Despite sometimes being tried as a centre-forward for Italy, Bonfantini claims she sees herself as a winger. She shows an ability to make runs down the flank in the non-possession phase of games, cutting inside to unmark herself and play between the lines when she's ready to receive a pass from her teammates. Bonfantini can also show an ability to come deep and exchange passes with her full-back in order to release her full-back into space down her flank.

== International goals ==
No.	Date	Venue	Opponent	Score	Result	Competition
1.	2 September 2022	Zimbru Stadium, Chișinău, Moldova	Moldova	4–0	8–0	2023 FIFA Women's World Cup qualification
2.	5 April 2024	Stadio San Vito-Gigi Marulla, Cosenza, Italy	Netherlands	2–0	2–0	UEFA Women's Euro 2025 qualifying
3.	2 December 2024	Ruhrstadion, Bochum, Germany	Germany	1–0	2–1	Friendly

== Honours ==
Roma

- Coppa Italia: 2020–21

Juventus

- Serie A: 2021–22
- Coppa Italia: 2021–22
- Supercoppa Italiana: 2021–22
