= Valentina Cernoia =

Italian footballer (born 1991)

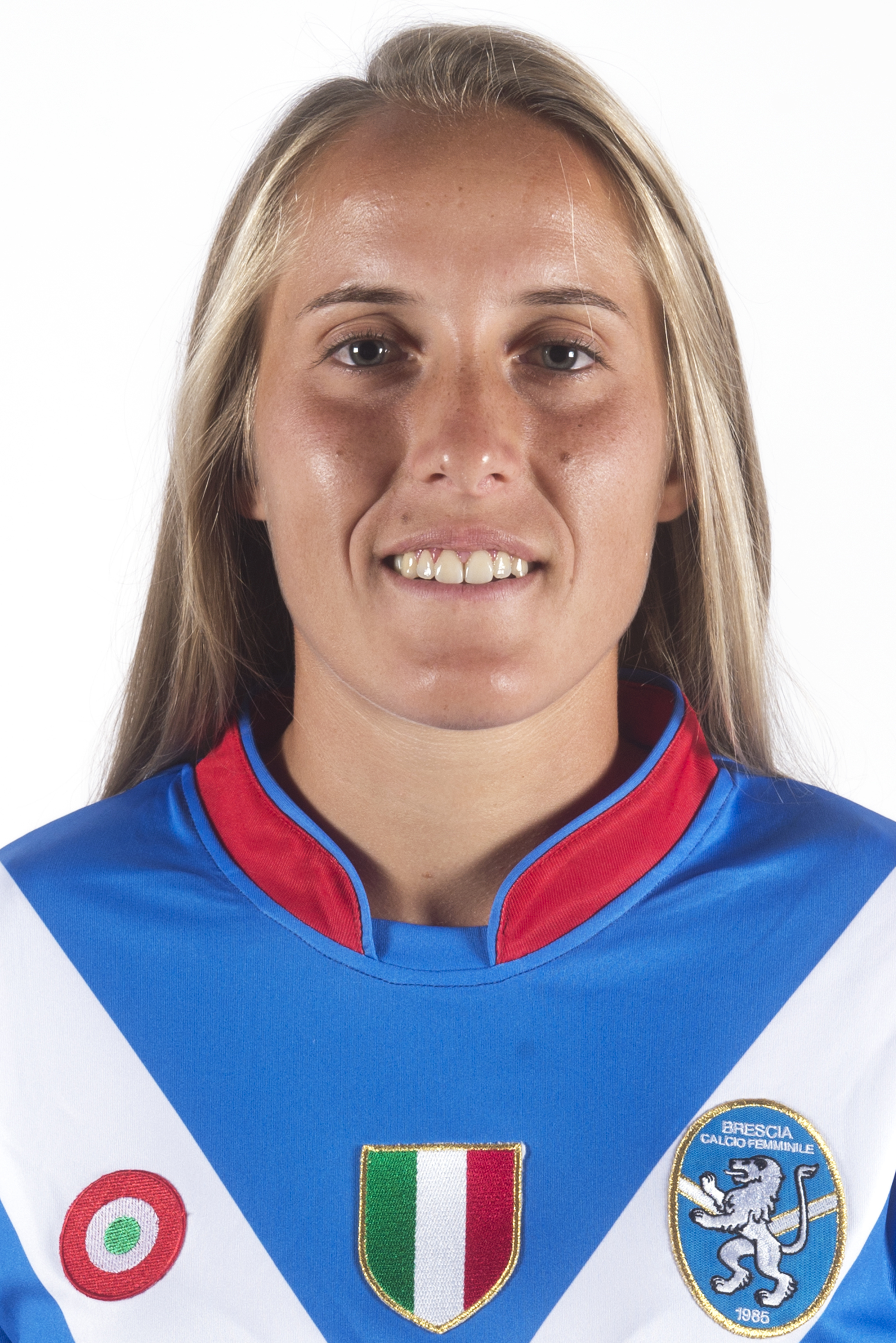
- Cernoia with Brescia in 2016

Personal information
- Date of birth: 22 June 1991 (age 35)
- Place of birth: Manerbio, Italy
- Height: 1.60 m (5 ft 3 in)
- Position: Midfielder

Team information
- Current team: Genoa
- Number: 16

Senior career*
Years	Team	Apps	(Gls)
- Manerbio Virtus
2008–2017	Brescia	180	(30)
2017–2023	Juventus	95	(24)
2023–2026	AC Milan	36	(2)
2026–	Genoa	0	(0)

International career^{‡}
2007	Italy U-17	3	(0)
2008	Italy U-19	13	(4)
2013–	Italy	68	(13)
- * Club domestic league appearances and goals as of 00:04, 26 May 2025 (UTC) ‡ National team caps and goals as of 20 July 2023

Valentina Cernoia (born 22 June 1991) is an Italian professional footballer who plays as a midfielder for Serie A club Genoa and the Italy women's national football team, which she represents since 2013.

== Career ==
Cernoia first played in the Serie A with ACF Brescia in the 2009–10 season following the team's promotion. In the 2013–14 season she played the UEFA Champions League for the first time and made her debut in the Italian national team in the 2015 FIFA World Cup qualifiers. In the summer of 2017 she played her first final tournament, the UEFA Women's Euro 2017, and moved to the newly founded Juventus FC women's team after nearly a decade in Brescia.

On 8 July 2023, Cernoia joined AC Milan.

== International career ==
Cernoia was called up to the Italy squad for the UEFA Women's Euro 2017.

Cernoia was called up to the Italy squad for the 2019 FIFA Women's World Cup.

On 26 June 2022, Cernoia was announced in the Italy squad for the UEFA Women's Euro 2022.

On 2 July 2023, Cernoia was called up to the 23-player Italy squad for the 2023 FIFA Women's World Cup.

Goals for the Italian WNT in official competitions
Competition	Stage	Date	Location	Opponent	Goals	Result	Overall
2015 FIFA World Cup	Qualifiers	2014–09–13	Vercelli	Estonia	1	4–0	2
2015 FIFA World Cup	Qualifiers	2014–09–17	Vercelli	North Macedonia	1	15–0	2
2017 UEFA Euro	Qualifiers	2015–09–18	La Spezia	Georgia	1	6–1	1

== Honours ==
Brescia

- Serie A: 2013–14, 2015–16
- Coppa Italia: 2012–13, 2014–15, 2015–16
- Italian Women's Super Cup: 2013–14, 2014–15, 2015–16

Juventus

- Serie A: 2017–18, 2018–19, 2019–20, 2020–21, 2021–22
- Coppa Italia: 2018–19, 2021–22, 2022–23
- Supercoppa Italiana: 2019, 2020–21, 2021–22

Individual

- AIC Best Women's XI: 2019

== Career statistics ==
COMPETITION	SEASON	FOOTBALL CLUB								
Euro Women	2021	Italy W	809	9	0	1	2	0	0	0
Champions League Women	2020/2021	Juventus W	180	2	0	0	0	0	0	0
Coppa Italia Women	2020/2021	Juventus W	90	1	0	0	0	0	0	0
Serie A Women	2020/2021	Juventus W	1009	16	5	6	6	1	4	0
Algarve Cup Women	2020	Italy W	159	2	0	1	0	0	0	0
Champions League Women	2019/2020	Juventus W	180	2	0	0	0	0	1	0
Coppa Italia Women	2019/2020	Juventus W	0	0	0	0	0	0	0	0
Serie A Women	2019/2020	Juventus W	1178	14	0	5	6	0	0	0
Friendly International Women	2019	Italy W	377	5	1	1	1	0	0	0
International Tournament (Cyprus) Women	2019	Italy W	265	4	1	2	1	1	0	0
World Cup Women	2019	Italy W	450	5	0	0	0	0	2	0
Champions League Women	2018/2019	Juventus W	90	1	0	1	0	0	0	0
Serie A Women	2018/2019	Juventus W	1470	20	2	7	4	2	1	0
Friendly International Women	2018	Italy W	152	2	0	2	0	0	0	0

== International goals ==
No.	Date	Venue	Opponent	Score	Result	Competition
1.	13 September 2014	Vercelli, Italy	Estonia	3–0	4–0	2015 FIFA Women's World Cup qualification
2.	17 September 2014	Vercelli, Italy	North Macedonia	11–0	15–0	2015 FIFA Women's World Cup qualification
3.	25 October 2014	Rieti, Italy	Ukraine	1–0	2–1	2015 FIFA Women's World Cup qualification – UEFA play-offs
4.	11 March 2015	Larnaca, Cyprus	Mexico	1–1	2–3	2015 Cyprus Women's Cup
5.	18 September 2015	La Spezia, Italy	Georgia	1–1	6–1	UEFA Women's Euro 2017 qualifying
6.	6 March 2019	Larnaca, Cyprus	North Korea	3–3	3–3 (a.e.t.) (6–7 p)	2019 Cyprus Women's Cup
7.	5 April 2019	Lublin, Poland	Poland	1–?	1–1	Friendly
8.	12 November 2019	Castel di Sangro, Italy	Malta	1–0	5–0	UEFA Women's Euro 2022 qualifying
9.	12 November 2019	Castel di Sangro, Italy	Malta	2–0	5–0	UEFA Women's Euro 2022 qualifying
10.	21 September 2021	Karlovac, Croatia	Croatia	5–0	5–0	2023 FIFA Women's World Cup qualification
11.	22 October 2021	Castel di Sangro, Italy	Croatia	1–0	3–0	2023 FIFA Women's World Cup qualification
12.	26 October 2021	Vilnius, Lithuania	Lithuania	1–0	5–0	2023 FIFA Women's World Cup qualification
13.	8 April 2022	Parma, Italy	Lithuania	4–0	7–0	2023 FIFA Women's World Cup qualification
