= Tuija Hyyrynen =

Finnish footballer (born 1988)

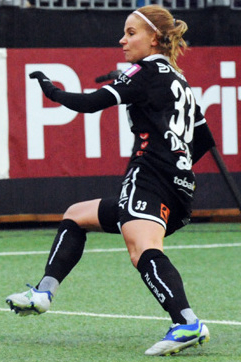
- Hyyrynen playing for Umeå IK in 2013

Personal information
- Full name: Tuija Annika Hyyrynen
- Date of birth: 10 March 1988 (age 38)
- Place of birth: Helsinki, Finland
- Height: 1.65 m (5 ft 5 in)
- Position: Defender

College career
Years	Team	Apps	(Gls)
2010	Florida State Seminoles	0	(0)

Senior career*
Years	Team	Apps	(Gls)
2005–2009	HJK Helsinki	19+	(7+)
2010	Pali Blues	0	(0)
2010	Åland United	4	(1)
2011–2015	Umeå IK	89	(2)
2016–2017	Fortuna Hjørring		
2017–2022	Juventus	74	(2)

International career^{‡}
2007–2022	Finland	115	(2)
- * Club domestic league appearances and goals as of 19 December 2021 ‡ National team caps and goals as of 10 February 2022

Tuija Annika Hyyrynen (born 10 March 1988) is a Finnish former footballer who played as a defender.

== Career ==
On 17 September 2010, Hyyrynen was announced at Åland United.

On 9 December 2015, Hyyrynen signed for Fortuna Hjørring.

During her time at Fortuna Hjørring, the club reached the UEFA Women's Champions League quarterfinals.

Hyyrynen signed for Juventus in 2017. During her time at Juventus, she won 5 consecutive league titles in a row. Hyyrynen also became the first ever Finnish women's player to play in the group stage of the Champions League.

Hyyrynen retired from football in 2022.

== International career ==
Since her senior debut against Scotland in September 2007, Hyyrynen has been a member of the Finland women's national football team. She scored her first international goal against Bulgaria on 18 June 2014, scoring in the 85th minute.

Hyyrynen took part in UEFA Women's Euro 2009.

In June 2013 Hyyrynen was named in national coach Andrée Jeglertz's Finland squad for UEFA Women's Euro 2013.

Hyyrynen was initially called up to the 2020 Cyprus Women's Cup, but had to pull out due to injury, being replaced by Jutta Rantala.

Hyyrynen was called up to the UEFA Women's Euro 2022 squad.

== After football ==
Hyyrynen has done punditry work for Ruutu+.

== Personal life ==
Hyyrynen is studying a PhD, and has a daughter. She also has an older sister.

== International goals ==
No.	Date	Venue	Opponent	Score	Result	Competition
1.	18 June 2014	Venue Bolt Arena, Helsinki, Finland	Bulgaria	3-0	4-0	2015 FIFA Women's World Cup qualification
2.	8 April 2022	Anton Malatinský Stadium, Trnava, Slovakia	Slovakia	1–0	1–1	2023 FIFA Women's World Cup qualification

== Honours ==
HJK

- Naisten Liiga: 2005
- Naisten Suomen Cup: 2006, 2007, 2008

Juventus

- Serie A: 2017–18, 2018–19, 2019–20, 2020–21, 2021–22
- Coppa Italia: 2018–19, 2021–22
- Supercoppa Italiana: 2019, 2020–21, 2021–22
