= Martina Rosucci =

Italian footballer (born 1992)

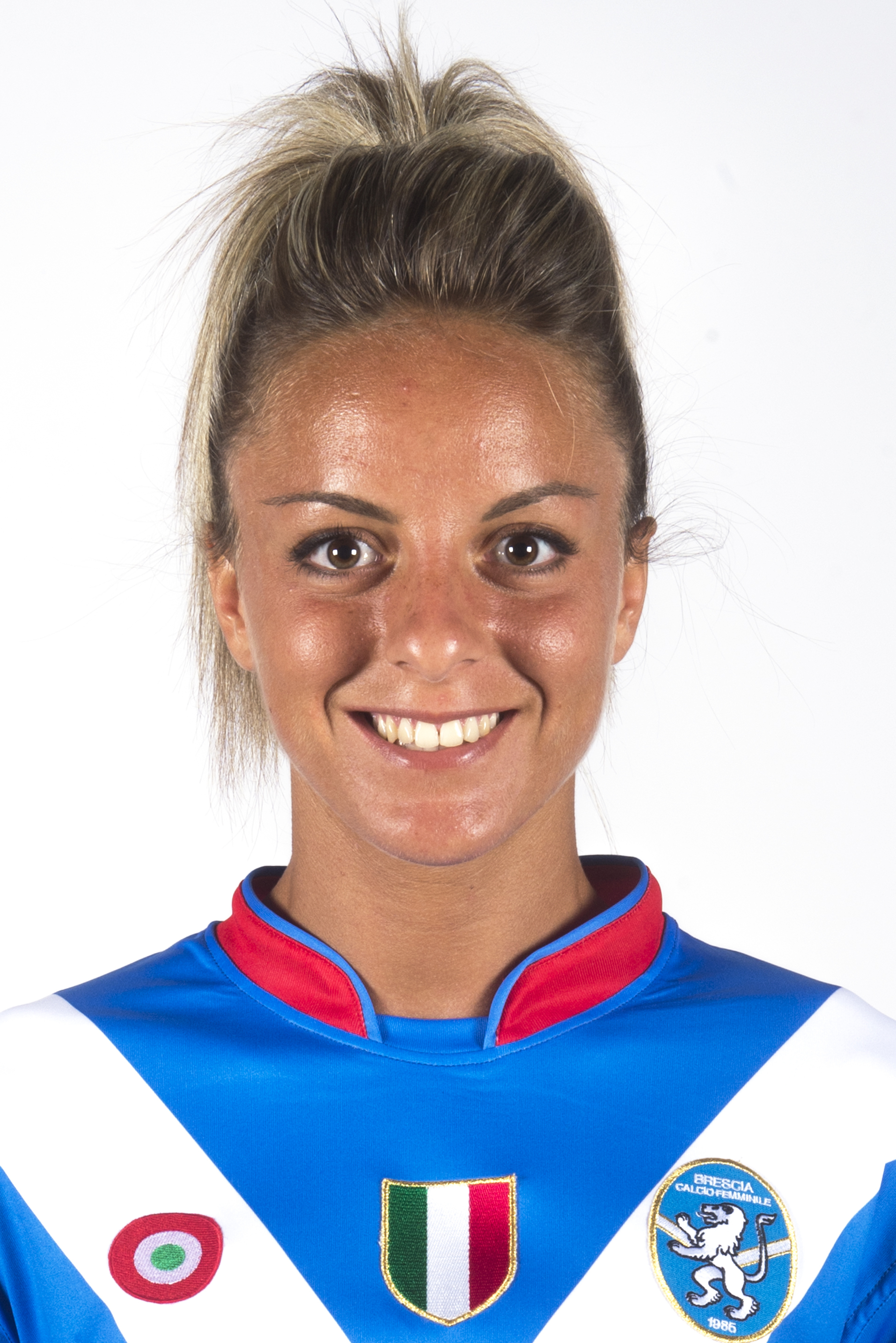
- Rosucci with Brescia in 2016

Personal information
- Date of birth: 9 May 1992 (age 34)
- Place of birth: Turin, Italy
- Height: 1.71 m (5 ft 7 in)
- Position: Centre-back

Team information
- Current team: Juventus
- Number: 8

Senior career*
Years	Team	Apps	(Gls)
2008–2011	Torino	65	(6)
2011–2017	Brescia	143	(37)
2017–	Juventus	124	(12)

International career^{‡}
2008–2009	Italy U17	8	(2)
2010–2011	Italy U19	31	(4)
2012–2013	Italy U20	8	(1)
2013–	Italy	80	(5)
- * Club domestic league appearances and goals as of 18 May 2026 (UTC) ‡ National team caps and goals as of 2 February 2023

Martina Rosucci (born 9 May 1992) is an Italian professional footballer who plays as a Centre-back for Serie A club Juventus and the Italy women's national team.

== Club career ==
Rosucci played for Torino before moving to Brescia in 2011. She joined Juventus in 2017.

On 3 October 2026, Rosucci renewed her contract with Juventus, extending her stay until 30 June 2028.

== International career ==
Rosucci was called up by manager Antonio Cabrini to be part of the Italy women's national football team for the UEFA Women's Euro 2013. She was also included in Italy's squad for the UEFA Women's Euro 2017.

Rosucci was called up to the Italy squad for the 2019 FIFA Women's World Cup.

On 26 June 2022, Rosucci was announced in the Italy squad for the UEFA Women's Euro 2022.

Goals scored for the Italian WNT in official competitions
Competition	Stage	Date	Location	Opponent	Goals	Result
2015 FIFA World Cup	Qualifiers	2013–09–20	Tallinn	Estonia	1	5–1
2019 FIFA World Cup	Qualifiers	2018–04–10	Ferrara	Belgium	1	2–1
UEFA Women's Euro 2022	Qualifiers	2019–11–08	Benevento	Georgia	1	6–0
UEFA Women's Euro 2022	Qualifiers	2021–02–24	Firenze	Israel	1	12–0

== Career statistics ==
=== Club ===
As of match played 17 May 2026

Appearances and goals by club, season and competition
Club	Season	League			Cups		Continental		Total	
Club	Season	Division	Apps	Goals	Apps	Goals	Apps	Goals	Apps	Goals
Torino Women	2008-09	Serie A	19	1	0	0	0	0	19	1
Torino Women	2009-10	Serie A	21	3	0	0	0	0	21	3
Torino Women	2010-11	Serie A	25	2	0	0	0	0	25	2
Torino Women	Total		65	6	0	0	0	0	65	6
Brescia	2011-12	Serie A	15	6	0	0	0	0	19	6
Brescia	2012–13	Serie A	20	4	3	0	0	0	23	4
Brescia	2013–14	Serie A	27	12	3	3	0	0	30	15
Brescia	2014-15	Serie A	25	5	5	2	2	0	32	7
Brescia	2015–16	Serie A	20	1	5	2	6	0	31	3
Brescia	2016-17	Serie A	6	2	4	0	2	0	12	2
Brescia	Total		113	30	20	7	10	0	143	37
Juventus	2017-18	Serie A	23	4	3	1	0	0	26	5
Juventus	2018-19	Serie A	2	0	2	0	0	0	4	0
Juventus	2019-20	Serie A	16	5	1	0	2	0	19	5
Juventus	2020-21	Serie A	19	0	7	0	1	0	27	0
Juventus	2021-22	Serie A	20	2	9	1	12	1	41	4
Juventus	2022-23	Serie A	17	0	5	0	6	1	28	1
Juventus	2023-24	Serie A	0	0	0	0	0	0	0	0
Juventus	2024-25	Serie A	16	1	4	0	4	0	24	1
Juventus	2025-26	Serie A	11	0	6	1	1	0	18	1
Juventus	Total		124	12	37	3	26	2	187	17
Career total			332	48	57	10	36	2	395	60

=== Youth ===
As of match played 21 July 2013

Appearances and goals by national youth team and year
National team	Year	Apps	Goals
Italy U19	2008	5	1
Italy U19	2009	10	2
Italy U19	2010	3	0
Italy U19	2011	3	0
Italy U20	2012	3	0
Italy U20	2013	2	0
Total		26	3

=== Senior ===
As of match played 22 February 2023

Appearances and goals by national team and year
National team	Year	Apps	Goals
Italy	2014	12	1
Italy	2015	10	0
Italy	2017	4	0
Italy	2018	8	1
Italy	2019	8	1
Italy	2020	5	0
Italy	2021	5	0
Italy	2022	14	0
Italy	2023	3	1
Total		69	3

== Honours ==
Brescia

- Serie A: 2013–14, 2015–16
- Coppa Italia: 2011–12, 2014–15, 2015–16
- Supercoppa Italiana: 2014, 2015, 2016

Juventus

- Serie A: 2017–18, 2018–19, 2019–20, 2020–21, 2021–22, 2024–25
- Coppa Italia: 2018–19, 2021–22, 2022–23, 2024–25
- Supercoppa Italiana: 2019, 2020, 2021, 2023, 2025
- Serie A Women's Cup: 2025, 2026

Italy U19

- UEFA Women's Under-19 Championship: 2008

Individual

- Pallone Azzurro: 2014
