= Annahita Zamanian =

French footballer (born 1998)

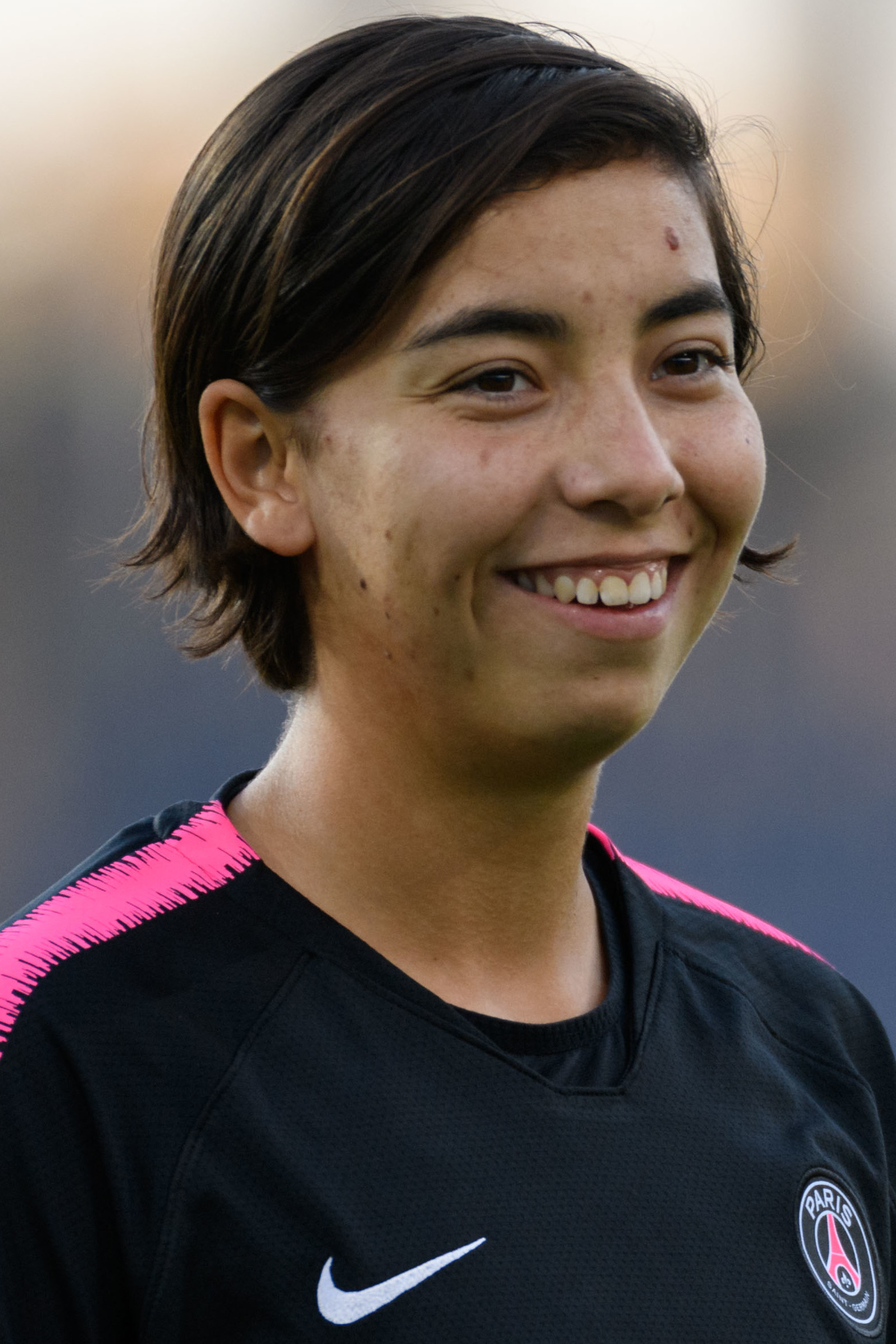
- Zamanian with Paris Saint-Germain in 2018

Personal information
- Full name: Annahita Le Loc’h Zamanian Bakhtiari
- Date of birth: 19 February 1998 (age 28)
- Place of birth: London, England
- Height: 1.63 m (5 ft 4 in)
- Position: Midfielder

Team information
- Current team: UD Tenerife
- Number: 4

Senior career*
| Years | Team | Apps | (Gls) |
| 2013–2015 | Göteborgs DFF | 35 | (88) |
| 2016–2018 | Kopparbergs/Göteborg | 34 | (4) |
| 2018–2019 | Paris Saint-Germain | 7 | (0) |
| 2020–2023 | Juventus | 51 | (5) |
| 2023 | → Fiorentina (loan) | 10 | (2) |
| 2023–2024 | Sassuolo | 11 | (2) |
| 2024 | Sampdoria | 9 | (0) |
| 2025–2026 | Parma | 22 | (2) |
| 2026– | UD Tenerife | 0 | (0) |

International career^{‡}
| 2014 | France U16 | 3 | (1) |
| 2014 | France U17 | 1 | (1) |
| 2018 | France U20 | 12 | (0) |
| 2021–2022 | France U23 | 4 | (0) |
- * Club domestic league appearances and goals as of 10 May 2026 ‡ National team caps and goals as of 27 August 2022

Annahita Le Loc’h Zamanian Bakhtiari (Persian: آناهیتا زمانیان بختیاری, born 19 February 1998) is a professional footballer who plays as a midfielder for Liga F club UD Tenerife. Born in England to an Iranian father and a French mother, Zamanian holds both British and French citizenship; she represented France internationally at youth level.

== Early and personal life ==
Zamanian was born in London to an Iranian father and French mother from Brittany, and moved to Sweden when she was four years old. Despite living most of her life in Sweden, she does not have a Swedish passport. She holds French and British citizenships. She has played for the French U-16 and U-17 teams.

Zamanian is fluent in English, French, Persian, Swedish, and Italian.

== Club career ==
Zamanian started her senior career representing Göteborgs DFF. After playing for Kopparbergs/Göteborg in the Damallsvenskan, Zamanian began playing for Paris Saint-Germain in 2018. She has featured for PSG in the 2018–19 UEFA Women's Champions League knockout phase.

On 2 January 2020, Zamanian joined Serie A champions Juventus. She renewed her contract in June 2020 after a successful start to the season, which included a goal in her debut match on 12 January 2020. On 25 June 2020, Juventus became league champions.

In January 2023, Zamanian joined Fiorentina on loan until the end of the season. She made her debut for Fiorentina on 28 January 2023 against Pomigliano and scored her first goal for the club in the following match against Sampdoria while being subsequently named in the league's team of the week for her performance.

Zamanian moved to Sassuolo for the 2023–24 season, helping them finish in fourth position, and was transferred to Sampdoria at the start of the 2024–25 campaign.

== International career ==
Zamanian played for the France women's national under-20 football team at the 2018 FIFA U-20 Women's World Cup.

== Club statistics ==
As of 24 April 2022

| Club | Season | League | | | Cup | | Continental | | Other | | Total | |
| Club | Season | Division | Apps | Goals | Apps | Goals | Apps | Goals | Apps | Goals | Apps | Goals |
|---|---|---|---|---|---|---|---|---|---|---|---|---|
| Kopparbergs/Göteborg | 2016 | Damallsvenskan | 11 | 2 | 3 | 1 | — | | — | | 14 | 3 |
| Kopparbergs/Göteborg | 2017 | Damallsvenskan | 18 | 0 | 1 | 0 | — | | — | | 19 | 0 |
| Kopparbergs/Göteborg | 2018 | Damallsvenskan | 5 | 2 | 0 | 0 | — | | — | | 5 | 2 |
| Kopparbergs/Göteborg | Total | | 34 | 4 | 4 | 1 | — | | — | | 38 | 5 |
| Paris Saint-Germain | 2018–19 | Division 1 | 7 | 0 | 2 | 1 | 3 | 0 | — | | 12 | 1 |
| Paris Saint-Germain | 2019–20 | Division 1 | 0 | 0 | 0 | 0 | 2 | 0 | — | | 2 | 0 |
| Paris Saint-Germain | Total | | 7 | 0 | 2 | 1 | 5 | 0 | — | | 14 | 1 |
| Juventus | 2019–20 | Serie A | 5 | 1 | 1 | 1 | — | | — | | 6 | 2 |
| Juventus | 2020–21 | Serie A | 19 | 2 | 4 | 2 | 1 | 0 | 1 | 0 | 25 | 4 |
| Juventus | 2021–22 | Serie A | 15 | 0 | 5 | 0 | 8 | 1 | 2 | 0 | 30 | 1 |
| Juventus | Total | | 39 | 3 | 10 | 3 | 9 | 1 | 3 | 0 | 61 | 7 |
| Career total | | | 80 | 7 | 16 | 5 | 14 | 1 | 3 | 0 | 113 | 13 |

== Honours ==
Juventus

- Serie A: 2019–20, 2020–21, 2021–22
- Coppa Italia: 2021–22
- Supercoppa Italiana: 2020, 2021
