= St. John International University =

Former university in Vinovo, Italy

- Motto: Schola Magistra Vitae
- Type: Private
- Active: 2007–2015
- Location: Vinovo, Italy; 44.949978°N 7.632269°E
- Website: sjiu.it (archived)

St. John International University (SJIU) was a private, independent university founded in 2007. It was incorporated by the U.S. state of New Hampshire in 2008 but lost its right to grant degrees in 2014. The university's campus was located in the Renaissance Della Rovere Castle in Vinovo (Torino), Italy, and its main office was in Concord, New Hampshire.

SJIU offered four-year undergraduate degrees, two-year graduate programs, short-term study abroad academic programs and English language preparatory programs. As detailed in its mission statement, it was the first environmental American university in Italy.

In May 2008 the Postsecondary Education Commission of the State of New Hampshire voted to grant approval to the university to offer undergraduate and graduate degrees. On June 29, 2009, the New Hampshire legislature authorized it to confer degrees upon its graduates, subject to the authority of the New Hampshire Postsecondary Education Commission. However, on June 30, 2014, the school lost its right to grant degrees.

== Academics ==
SJIU offered undergraduate and graduate courses in the liberal arts, humanities and arts and sciences. Courses throughout the summer and academic year were available in the following disciplines: architecture, art history, environmental sciences, political science, business administration, economics, history, Italian language and culture, film studies, computer science, sociology, religious studies, and modern languages and literature.

St. John International University offered the following undergraduate and graduate programs:

- B.A. in Art History
- B.A. in Business Administration
- B.A. in Film Studies
- B.S. in Environmental Architecture
- B.S. in Environmental Studies
- Masters in Architecture (M.Arch.)
- Masters in Business Administration (M.B.A.)
- Master of Arts in International Arts Administration (M.I.I.A.)

== Loss of ability to grant degrees ==
On June 30, 2014, after several years of controversy related to lack of proper finances and unpaid wages to current and former employees, St. John International University lost its degree-granting authority when the New Hampshire Higher Education Commission voted unanimously not to renew the school's degree-granting authority, thus allowing it to expire. Since the authority was simply allowed to expire, rather than being revoked, SJIU does not have the option of appealing the Commission's decision.

== Bankruptcy ==
On July 6, 2015, the District Court of Turin declared St. John International University, Inc. bankrupt.
