= Lisa Boattin =

Italian footballer (born 1997)

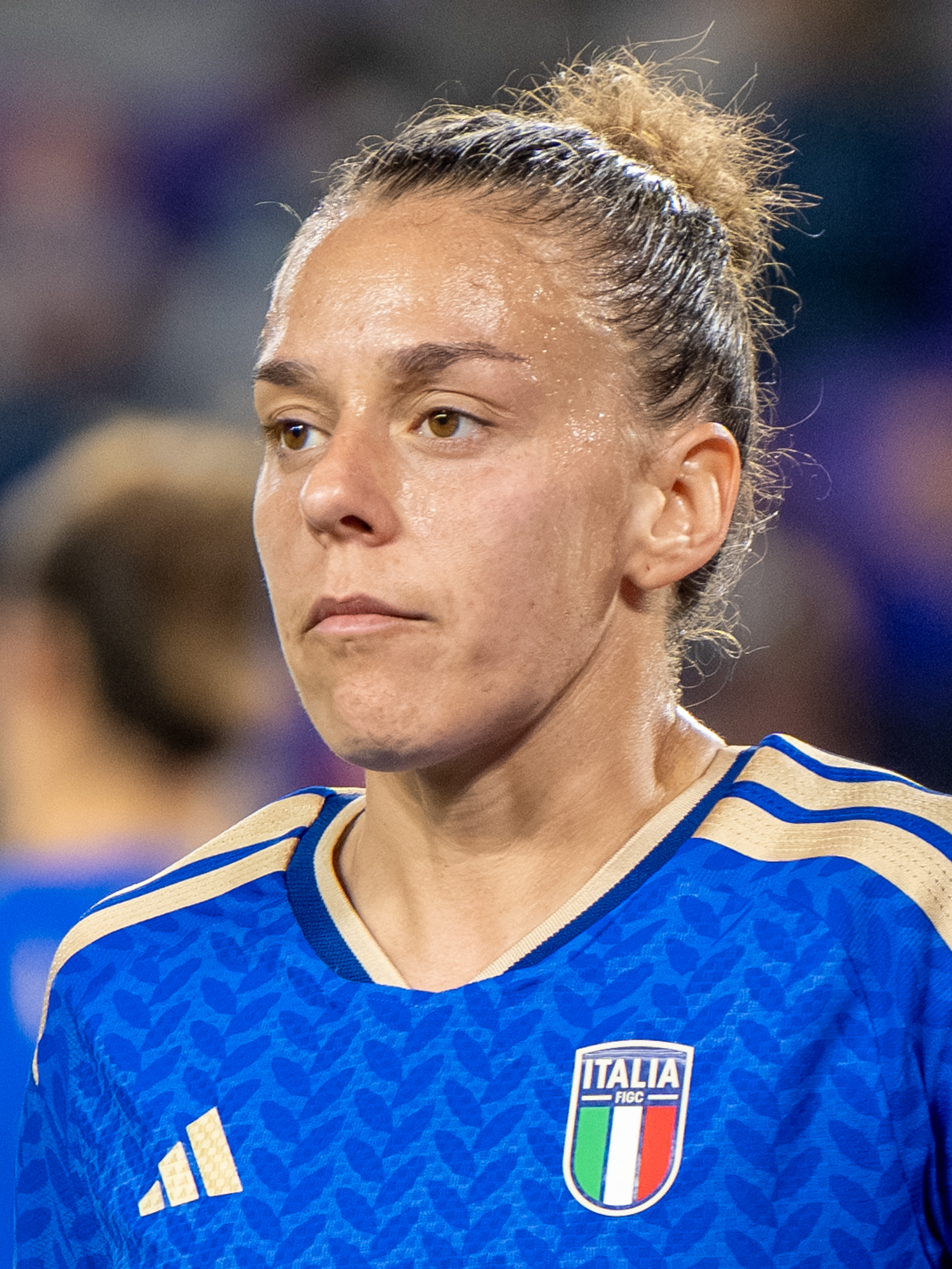
- Boattin with Italy in 2025

Personal information
- Date of birth: 3 May 1997 (age 29)
- Place of birth: Portogruaro, Italy
- Height: 1.60 m (5 ft 3 in)
- Position: Left back

Team information
- Current team: Houston Dash
- Number: 27

Senior career*
Years	Team	Apps	(Gls)
2011–2012	Venezia	24	(0)
2012–2014	Graphistudio Pordenone	46	(1)
2014–2016	Brescia	27	(1)
2016–2017	AGSM Verona	19	(5)
2017–2025	Juventus	150	(14)
2025–	Houston Dash	30	(1)

International career^{‡}
2013–2014	Italy U17	21	(2)
2015–2016	Italy U19	10	(1)
2016–	Italy	73	(1)
- * Club domestic league appearances and goals as of 03:11, 8 November 2026 (UTC) ‡ National team caps and goals as of 9 July 2026 (UTC)

Lisa Boattin (born 3 May 1997) is an Italian professional footballer who plays as a left back for Houston Dash of the National Women's Soccer League (NWSL) and the Italy national team.

== Club career ==
Boattin with the Houston Dash in 2026

Boattin made her club debut in 2011 for Venezia. For the next season, she was transferred to Graphistudio Pordenone. In July 2014, Boattin signed for Brescia.

=== Juventus ===
In November 2017, she scored her first goal for Juventus, a penalty against Res Roma. She made two appearances for Juventus in the 2018–19 UEFA Women's Champions League. She played for Juventus in the 2018–19 Italian Women's Cup final. Juventus beat Fiorentina 2–1. In May 2019, Boattin extended her contract with Juventus until 2021. She started every match of Juventus' title-winning 2020–21 Serie A season, and was voted the fan's player of the season. On 15 July 2021, she extended her contract until 2023. On 30 January 2022, Boattin scored a goal directly from corner kick in the third minute of the stoppage time to draw 1–1 in a Coppa Italia match against Inter. In 2022, she was the Serie A Female Footballer of the Year.

=== Houston Dash ===
On 11 August 2025, Boattin moved to the United States and joined National Women's Soccer League club Houston Dash on a two-and-a-half-year contract. She made her NWSL debut on 14 September, coming on as a second-half substitute in a 2–0 loss to the Utah Royals.

== International career ==
Boattin captained Italy U17 at the 2014 UEFA Women's Under-17 Championship and 2014 FIFA U-17 Women's World Cup. Italy U-17 came third at both events, and Boattin scored in a penalty shootout at the World Cup, as Italy beat Venezuela U-17.

She played for Italy in two matches in the qualification for the 2019 FIFA Women's World Cup. In May 2019, she was named in the squad for the 2019 FIFA Women's World Cup in France. She was one of eight Juventus players in the squad.

After taking part in the UEFA Women's Euro 2022, where Italy got eliminated in the group stage, Boattin was also involved in the final matches of the qualifiers to the 2023 FIFA Women's World Cup in Australia and New Zealand. On 6 September 2021, she scored her first goal for the Italian senior national team with a 22-yard strike, as she sealed a 2–0 home win against Romania: thanks to this result, the Azzurre gained direct qualification to the second World Cup in a row for the first time in their history.

On 2 July 2023, Boattin was called up to the 23-player Italy squad for the 2023 FIFA Women's World Cup.

On 25 June 2025, Boattin was called up to the Italy squad for the UEFA Women's Euro 2025.

== International goals ==
No.	Date	Venue	Opponent	Score	Result	Competition
1.	6 September 2022	Stadio Paolo Mazza, Ferrara, Italy	Romania	2–0	2–0	2023 FIFA Women's World Cup qualification

== Personal life ==
Boattin was born in Portogruaro, Veneto, Italy.

Boattin is in a relationship and lives together with Swedish footballer Linda Sembrant.

== Honours ==
Brescia

- Serie A: 2015–16
- Coppa Italia: 2015–16
- Supercoppa Italiana: 2015, 2016

Juventus

- Serie A: 2017–18, 2018–19, 2019–20, 2020–21, 2021–22, 2024–25
- Coppa Italia: 2018–19, 2021–22, 2022–23, 2024–25
- Supercoppa Italiana: 2019, 2020, 2021, 2023

Individual

- Serie A MVP: 2021–22
- Serie A Best Defender: 2021–22
- AIC Serie A Female Footballer of the Year: 2021–22
- AIC Serie A Women's Team of the Year: 2019–20, 2020–21, 2021–22, 2022–23
