= Vinovo =

Vinovo Vineuv
- Comune
- Comune di Vinovo
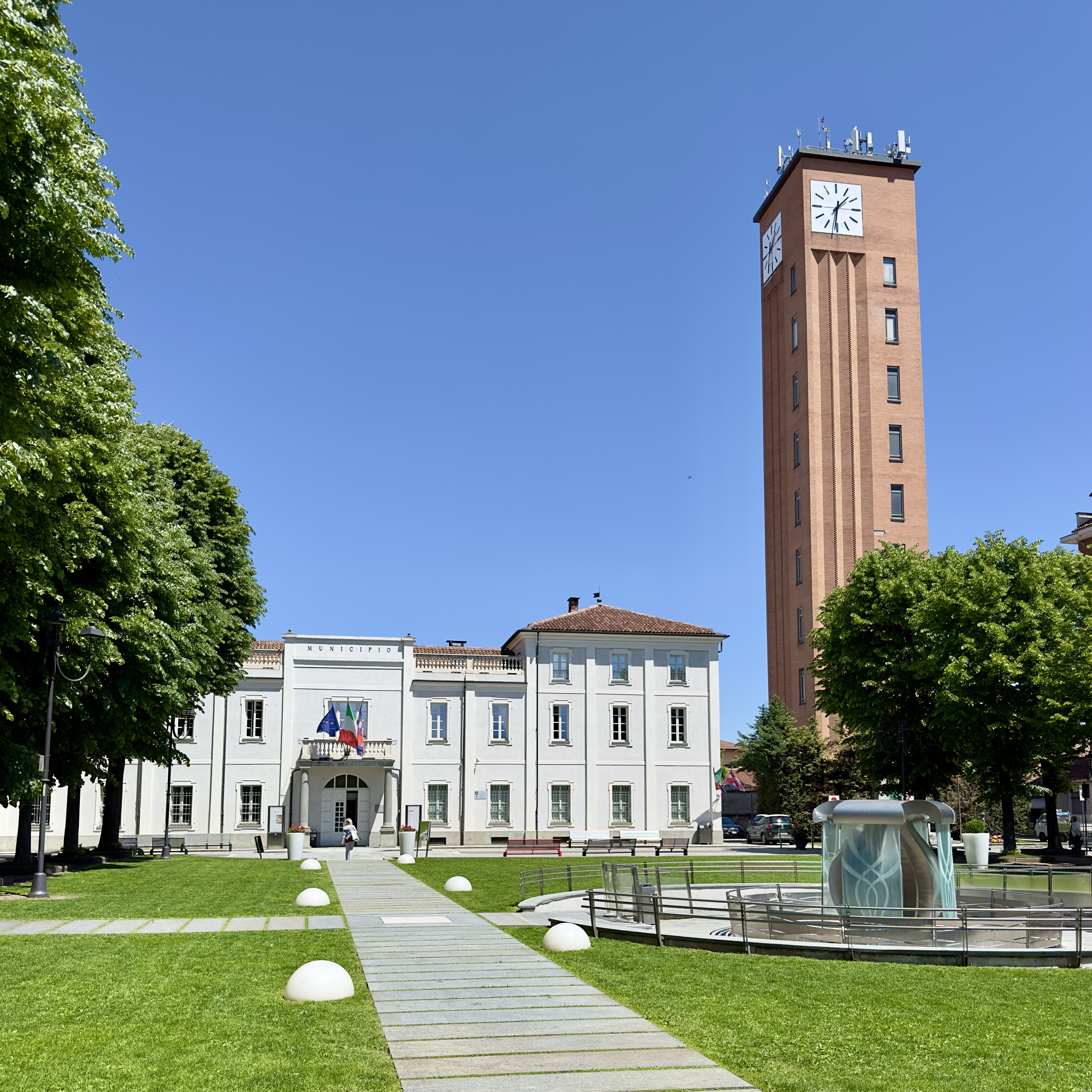
- Marconi square with garden, fountain, Town Hall - Clock Tower on the right side

- Coat of arms

- Location within Italy Location within Piedmont
- Coordinates: 44°57′N 7°38′E
- Country: Italy
- Region: Piedmont
- Metropolitan city: Turin (TO)
- Frazioni: Garino, Tetti Grella, Tetti Rosa, Tetti Caglieri, Dega, Tetti Borno

Government
  - Mayor: Gianfranco Guerrini (UniamoVinovo (civic list))

Area
  - Total: 17.7 km^{2} (6.8 sq mi)
- Elevation: 220 m (720 ft)

Population (1-1-2017)
  - Total: 14,628
  - Density: 826/km^{2} (2,140/sq mi)
- Demonym: Vinovese(i)
- Time zone: UTC+1 (CET)
  - Summer (DST): UTC+2 (CEST)
- Postal code: 10048
- Dialing code: 011
- Patron saint: St. Bartholomew
- Saint day: August 24
- Website: Official website

Vinovo (Piedmontese: Vineuv) is a comune (municipality) in the Metropolitan City of Turin in the Italian region Piedmont, located about 14 kilometres (9 mi) southwest of Turin.

Vinovo is home to the training ground of Serie A football team Juventus. The Della Rovere Castle hosts the campus of St. John International University, a private American University.

== History ==
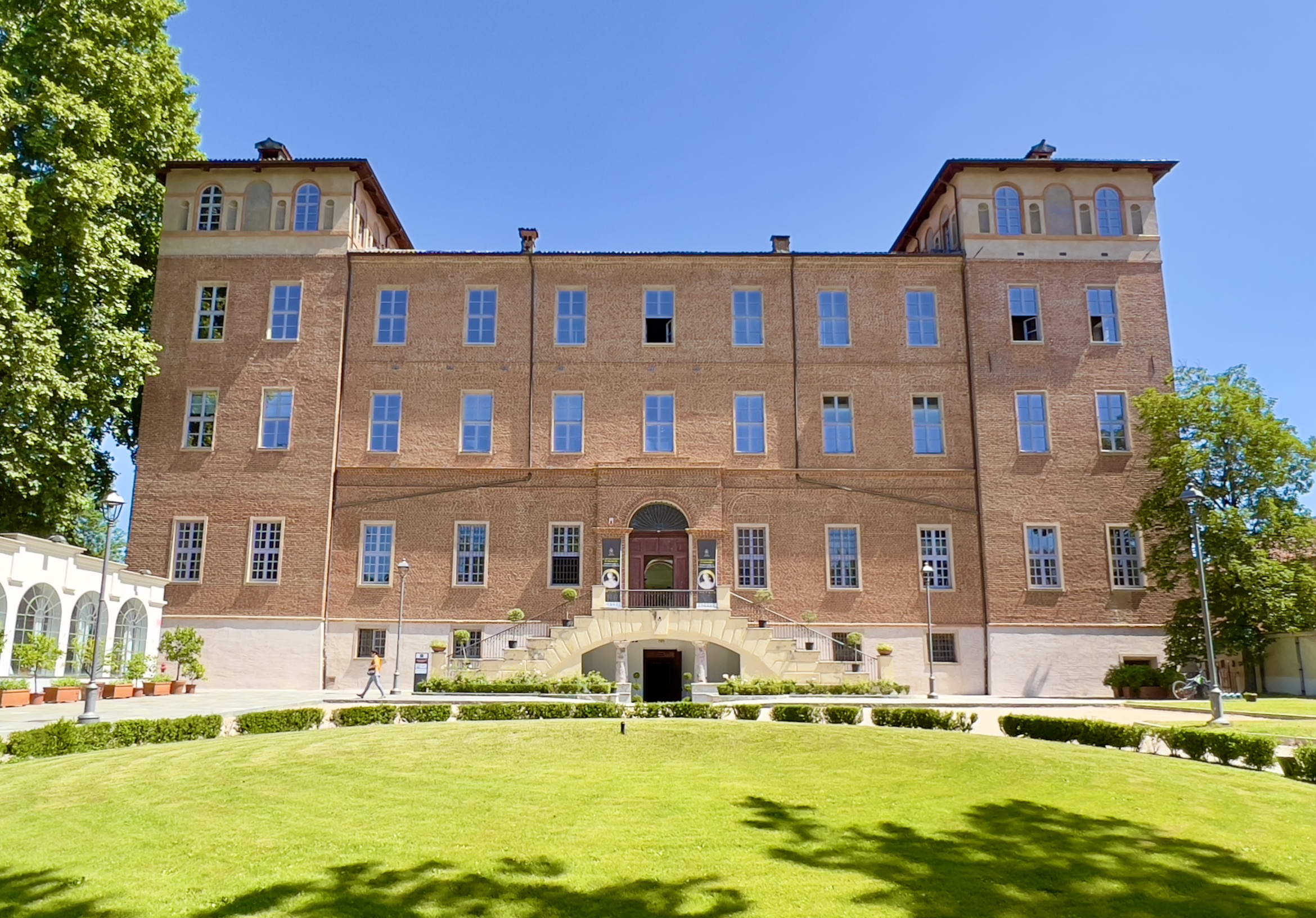
Della Rovere Castle.

The city has enjoyed a relatively long history, with roots going back to ancient times. In fact, remains dating from the fifth century AD have been found in this area, and the oldest historical documents date back to 1040. The notarized document certified that the Marquis Romagnano donated to the Abbey of San Silano Romagnano some land sites in the territory of Vinovo. In this document, the territory is referred to as Vicus Novus, a name that remained in the Middle Ages to designate the group of buildings and land that various landowners owned. In 1268, a bill of sale sees the appearance in local history, the Della Rovere family, who became the mistress of the whole territory in 1400.

The birth of the municipality is dated 1458 when Duke Ludovico di Savoia granted to the Community Vinovese statutes in defense of citizens. With the death of the last descendant of the Della Rovere, in 1692, the estate was sold to the Counts of vinovese Lanze who governed until 1732. In that year, Cardinal Carlo Vittorio Amedeo delle Lanze ceded the city to Duke Charles Emmanuel II, who donated it, together with Stupinigi, Commandery of the Order to Maurice. The Order was suppressed in 1800 and many were sold to private lands, and only after 1815, it was rebuilt with the heritage and part of Stupinigi Vinovo: the castle, some land, farms, and forests. In 1865, the fraction of Stupinigi was finally separated from the city and annexed in Nichelino.

In 1775 the castle was used as a factory for manufacture of pottery and porcelain, and after 1780 went through a golden period under the direction of Vittorio Amedeo Gioanetti. At the end of the 800 famous ceramic industry were joined at the furnaces and mills, which led to a gradual increase of the population, with consequent expansion of the country, and the necessary construction of public buildings like the town hall, schools, kindergarten and the House of Cottolengo. With regard to cultural life, in 1847 the Philharmonic was founded Vinovese Giuseppe Verdi, body music band of the city, continuously active since then. A sign of progress and was also gained importance in 1882, the opening of a tramway that connected the station of Porta Nuova in Vinovo. In 1941 the country suffered a bombing raid by the RAF planes whose consequences were three injured and many houses destroyed.

== People ==
- Giovanni Valetti (1913-1998), professional road racing cyclist
- Domenico della Rovere (1442-1501), Italian cardinal and patron of arts
- Vittorio Amedeo Gioanetti (1729-1825), physician and chemist

== Twin towns – sister cities ==
Vinovo is twinned with:

- Luque, Argentina.
- Casalbore, Italy
