= Mana Mihashi =

Japanese footballer (born 1994)

Personal information
- Full name: Mana Mihashi
- Date of birth: 13 September 1994 (age 32)
- Place of birth: Takarazuka, Japan
- Height: 1.74 m (5 ft 9 in)
- Position: Midfielder

Youth career
- 2014-2017: Osaka University

Senior career*
Years	Team	Apps	(Gls)
2017–2019	MyNavi Sendai Vegalta	23	(0)
2020–2022	U.S. Sassuolo Calcio	42	(3)
2022–2023	Inter Milan	23	(0)
Total		88	(3)

International career^{‡}
2014–2017	Japan U23	0	(0)
- * Club domestic league appearances and goals as of 20:14, 1 August 2023 (UTC) ‡ National team caps and goals as of 16 March 2023

Mana Mihashi (三橋眞奈, Mihashi Mana; born 13 September 1994) is a Japanese former professional footballer who played as a midfielder. Besides Japan, she had played in Italy.

Born in Takarazuka, Hyōgo Prefecture, Mihashi begun her professional career with MyNavi Sendai in Japan's Nadeshiko League in 2017 after graduating from university. She joined Serie A side Sassuolo in 2020. In the summer of 2022, she joined Inter Milan before retiring at the end the season.

== Club career ==
=== MyNavi Sendai ===
Following the end of Mihashi's college career with the Osaka Sports University women's football team, in 2017 she joined MyNavi Sendai Vegalta in the Nadeshiko League, the top level of the Japanese league pyramid at the time. She spent three seasons at the Sendai club where she made 23 Nadeshiko League appearances, 20 WE League Cup appearances, scoring 2 goals, and 7 Empress Cup appearances, scoring 1 goal, deciding at the end of the 2019 season to leave the club in search of a new challenge.

=== Sassuolo ===
In the summer of 2020, it was announced that Mihashi would be playing for U.S. Sassuolo Calcio in the upcoming season. Head coach Gianpiero Piovani decided to give Mihashi her Serie A debut in the first game of the season. Her first season saw Sassuolo finishing in third place, with most of the season spent fighting A.C. Milan for second position, and being rewarded with a place in the UEFA Women's Champions League. Piovani employed her in all 22 Serie A matches, where Mihashi scored for the first time in game week 6, in a 3–0 home win over Fiorentina.

Remaining with Sassuolo for the 2021–2022 season, she made 20 league appearances, as well as scoring the winning goal in the final match of the season in a 2–1 win over Inter Milan. In her second season she helped Sassuolo finish in fourth place, narrowly missing the final Champions League spot.

=== Inter Milan ===
During the summer of 2022, Inter Milan announced Mihashi would be joining them for the upcoming 2022–2023 season. She made her debut for the club in a 3–3 draw against Juventus on 11 September 2022

=== Retirement ===
Mihashi announced her retirement from professional football to move into coaching at the end of the 2022–2023 season.

== International career ==
Mihashi was part of the Japan national under-23 football team between 2014 and 2017. During her time with the team, she took part in the Gwangju Universiade, scoring a goal against Mexico, and obtaining the bronze medal.

== Career statistics ==
=== Club ===
Appearances and goals by club, season and competition
Club	Season	League			National cup (Note: Includes Empress's Cup, Coppa Italia)		League cup (Note: Includes Nadeshiko League Cup)		Other		Total	
Club	Season	Division	Apps	Goals	Apps	Goals	Apps	Goals	Apps	Goals	Apps	Goals
MyNavi Sendai	2017	Nadeshiko League	10	0	3	0	7	0	–		20	0
MyNavi Sendai	2018	Nadeshiko League	4	0	1	1	5	1	–		10	2
MyNavi Sendai	2019	Nadeshiko League	9	0	3	0	8	1	–		20	1
MyNavi Sendai	Total		23	0	7	1	20	2	–		50	3
Sassuolo	2020–21	Serie A	22	2	3	0	–		–		25	2
Sassuolo	2021–22	Serie A	20	1	2	1	–		1 (Note: Appearance(s) in Supercoppa Italiana)	0	23	2
Sassuolo	Total		42	3	5	1	–		1	0	48	4
Inter Milan	2022–23	Serie A	23	0	4	0	–		–		27	0
Career total			88	3	16	2	20	2	1	0	125	7
