= Juventus Training Center (Vinovo) =

Juventus F.C. training facility

- Vinovo
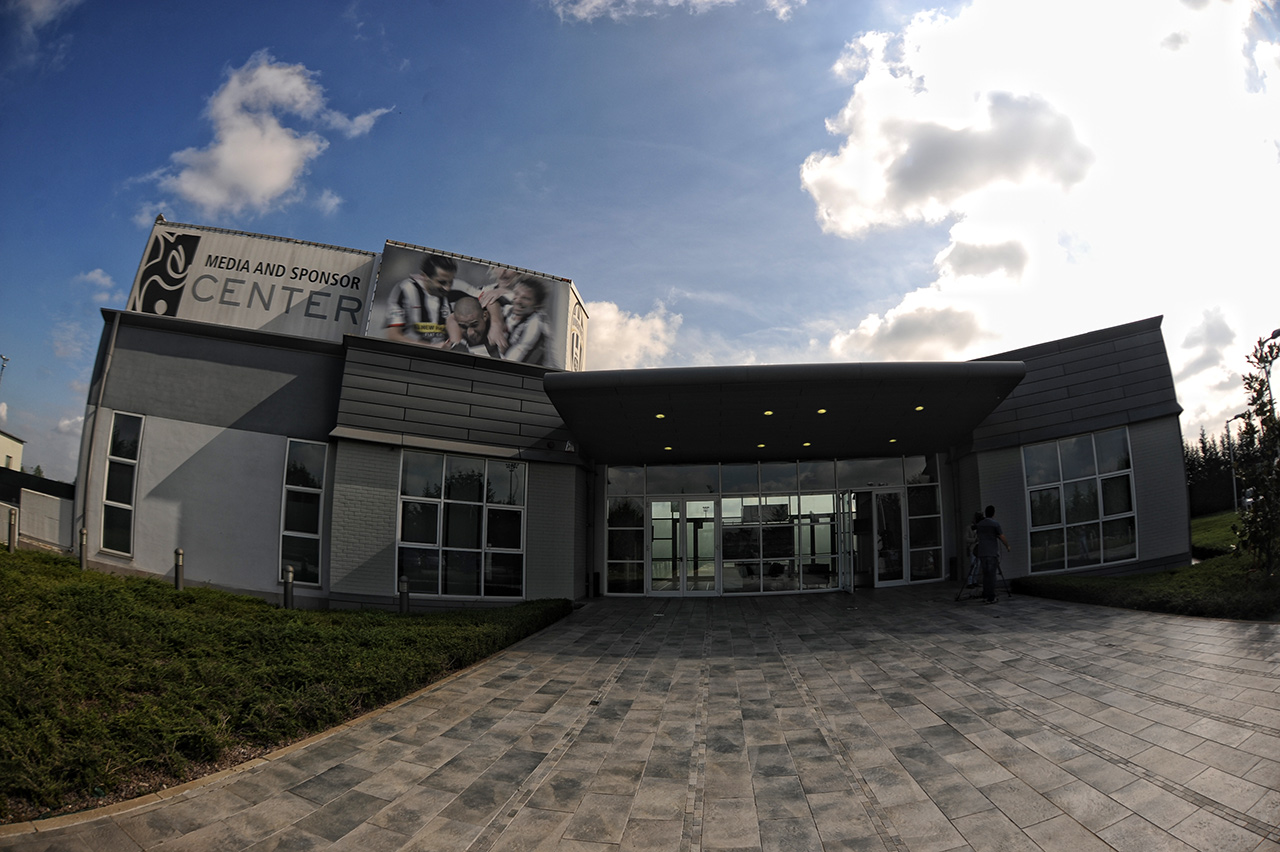
- Interactive map of Juventus Training Center
- Location: Vinovo
- Coordinates: 44°58′40″N 07°36′58″E
- Owner: Juventus FC
- Capacity: 400
- Type: Football training facility

Construction
- Groundbreaking: 2004
- Opened: 2006
- Cost: € 12.5 million

The Juventus Training Center (colloquially known as "the Vinovo") is a football training facility owned by Juventus, located in Vinovo a comune 14 kilometres southwest of the city of Turin. Designed by GAU and Shesa, the training ground features modern facilities and was opened in August 2006. The facility measures a total of 162,900 square meters and originally cost €12.5 million.

Owned through Campi di Vinovo S.p.A., controlled by the club to 71.3% until 2003, until 2018, it was used as a training ground for the Juventus men's team until the construction of the new training center; it is now exclusively used for the matches and training for that of the Juventus youth sector (already from 2017), and that of the women's team.

== Facilities ==
The training area includes:

- eleven regular playing fields (nine in natural grass and two in synthetic grass), of which:
  - one of reduced size;
  - one with a mobile pressostatic cover, used in case of cold and bad weather;
  - the "Campo Ale & Ricky" (dedicated to the memory of Alessio Ferramosca and Riccardo Neri, youths of the young bianconeri who drowned in a facility pond), with a 400-seat grandstand, reserved for matches of Juventus Women and of all the Juventus youth sector;
- a swimming pool that allows counter-current swimming and hydro massage;
- a physiotherapy center;
- a gym for heating and muscle building;
- soccer tennis;
- seven locker rooms for competitive sports (one for Juventus Women and six for youth teams);
- two warehouses.

The media center includes:

- a hotel of about 350 m^{2};
- a sports medicine center;
- a room for technical meetings;
- the JTV television studios;
- the press room, which can accommodate up to 30 journalists, for press conferences.
