= SSD Empoli Ladies FBC =

Women's association football club from Italy

Empoli Ladies
- Full name: Società Sportiva Dilettantistica Empoli Ladies FBC
- Nickname: [Le] Azzurre (The Blues)
- Short name: Empoli
- Founded: 23 June 2016; 10 years ago
- Ground: Centro Sportivo Monteboro
- Chairman: Rebecca Corsi
- Website: http://www.empoliladies.it/
Home colours	Away colours	Third colours

Società Sportiva Dilettantistica Empoli Ladies FBC, known as Empoli Ladies or simply Empoli, is a women's football club based in Empoli, Tuscany, Italy. It was established in 2016 as the women's section of Empoli, following an acquisition of the sporting license of Castelfranco. Having debuted in the Serie B, the team first competed in the Serie A in 2017–18. They disbanded their senior team in 2022, and have only operated at youth level since.

== History ==
Following a collaboration in 2015–16 with Castelfranco, the management of Empoli decided to form a women's football club in June 2016, buying 51% of the shares of the Castelfranco di Sotto club, and registering the team under the name of Empoli Ladies FBC. In their first season in 2016–17, the team played in the 2016–17 Serie B, finishing in first place and earning promotion to the Serie A, the top flight of Italian football. In the same season Empoli reached the semi-finals of the Coppa Italia, where they were eliminated by eventual champions Fiorentina.

The first season in the Serie A started with a home draw against San Zaccaria; they finished in last place and were relegated to the Serie B. The 2018–19 season saw Empoli play in the first Serie B championship organized in a single group. They finished the tournament in second place, gaining promotion back to the Serie A.

At the end of the 2021–22 season, which ended with a ninth-place finish in the Serie A and a semi-finals finish in the Coppa Italia, Empoli decided to sell the Empoli Ladies company to Parma, continuing to operate in the youth sector.

== Managerial history ==
Name	Nationality	Years
Alessandro Pistolesi	(Italy)	2016–2020
Alessandro Spugna	(Italy)	2020–2021
Fabio Ulderici	(Italy)	2021–2022

== Honours ==
- Serie B
  - Winners (1): 2016–17

== See also ==
- List of women's association football clubs
- List of women's football clubs in Italy
