= 2021–22 Supercoppa Italiana (women) =

Football tournament season

2021 Supercoppa Italiana
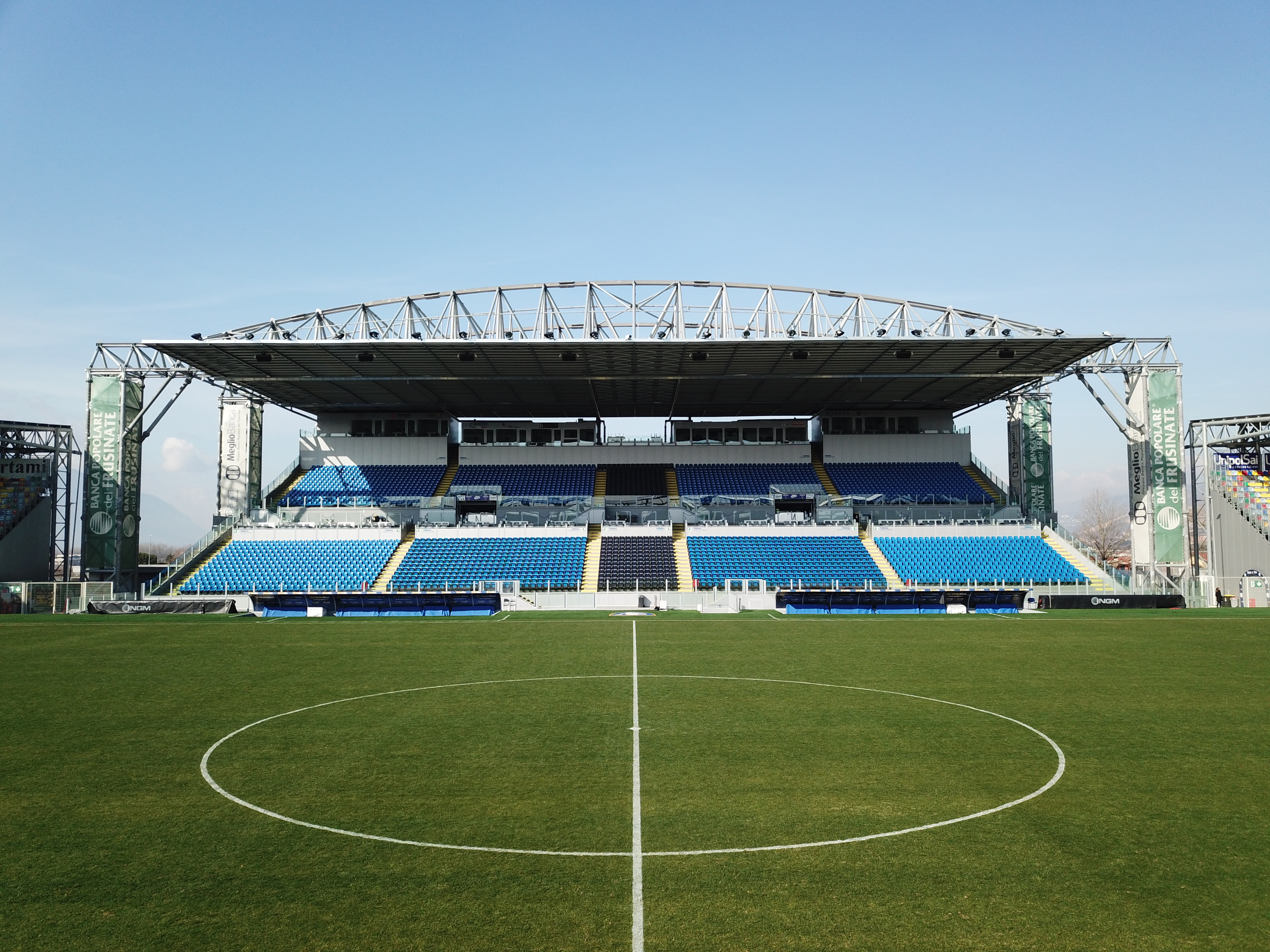
- Stadio Benito Stirpe, hosted the final on 8 January 2022

Tournament details
- Country: Italy
- Cities: Frosinone, Latina
- Dates: 5 January 2022-8 January 2022
- Teams: 4

Final positions
- Champions: Juventus (3rd title)
- Runners-up: Milan

Tournament statistics
- Matches played: 3
- Goals scored: 8 (2.67 per match)
- Top goal scorer: 7 players (1 goal each)

Awards
- Best player: Cristiana Girelli

The 2021 Supercoppa Italiana (branded as the 2021 Supercoppa Italiana Ferrovie dello Stato Italiane for sponsorship reasons) was the 25th edition of the Supercoppa Italiana.

Just like the previous edition, on 16 April 2021, it was announced that the format would be extended from two to four teams. It was contested by Juventus the 2020–21 Serie A champions, Roma the 2020–21 Coppa Italia champions, Milan and Sassuolo. For the second time in a row, the competition was played in the calendar year following the end of Serie A and the Coppa Italia.

The matches were played in Frosinone at Stadio Benito Stirpe between 5-8 January 2022 and Juventus won for the third time in a row.

== Qualified teams ==
Team	Qualified as
Juventus	2020–21 Serie A winner
Milan	2020–21 Serie A runners-up & 2020–21 Coppa Italia runners-up
Sassuolo	2020–21 Serie A third place
Roma	2020–21 Coppa Italia winners

== Matches ==
The draw was made on 24 November 2021.

=== Bracket ===
Semi-finals
5 January 2022 – Latina
Roma	1
Milan	2
5 January 2022 – Frosinone
Juventus (p)	1 (4)
Sassuolo	1 (3)

Final
8 January 2022 – Frosinone
Milan	1
Juventus	2

=== Semi-finals ===
5 January 2022
14:30 CET

Roma	1–2	Milan
Ciccotti 76'	Report	Thomas 32'; Bergamaschi 36'

Stadio Domenico Francioni, Latina
Referee: Giordano

5 January 2022
17:30 CET

Juventus	1–1	Sassuolo
Nildén 10'	Report	Clelland 11'
Penalties
Boattin (penalty missed); Gama (penalty scored); Girelli (penalty scored); Bonansea (penalty scored); Junge (penalty scored)	4–3	(penalty scored) Dubcová; (penalty missed) Cantore; (penalty scored) Mihashi; (penalty scored) Clelland; (penalty missed) Philtjens

Stadio Benito Stirpe, Frosinone
Referee: Carriano

=== Final ===
8 January 2022
14:30 CET

Milan	1–2	Juventus
Grimshaw 45+1'	Report	Bergamaschi 50' (o.g.); Girelli 87'

Stadio Benito Stirpe, Frosinone
Referee: Maria Sole Ferrieri Caputi

== Broadcasting ==
Italian broadcasters La7 and La7d has secured linear and digital rights to domestic women’s club football competitions for the 2021–22 and 2022–23 seasons as part of an extended rights deal with the Italian Football Federation, which includes Supercoppa Italiana.

== See also ==
- Supercoppa Italiana (women)
