= 2021–22 Serie A (women) =

55th season of top women's football (soccer) league in Italy

Serie A (women)
- Season: 2021–22
- Dates: 28 August 2021 – 15 May 2022
- Champions: Juventus
- Relegated: Verona; Lazio; Napoli
- Women's Champions League: Juventus; Roma
- Matches: 132
- Goals: 430 (3.26 per match)
- Top goalscorer: Daniela Sabatino (15)
- Biggest home win: Roma 8–0 Sampdoria (7 May 2022)
- Biggest away win: Lazio 1–8 Milan (11 September 2021)
- Highest scoring: Lazio 1–8 Milan (11 September 2021)
- Longest winning run: Juventus (12 matches)
- Longest unbeaten run: Juventus (14 matches)
- Longest winless run: Verona (17 matches)
- Longest losing run: Lazio (9 matches)

The 2021–22 Serie A (women) was the 55th season of the women's football top-level league in Italy. It began on 28 August 2021.

== Teams ==
=== Team changes ===
Promoted from 2020 to 2021 Serie B (women)	Relegated from 2020–21 Serie A (Women)
Lazio; Pomigliano	Bari; San Marino

=== Stadiums and locations ===
Locations of the 2021–22 Serie A teams

Team	Home city	Stadium	2020–21 season
Empoli	Empoli	Centro sportivo Monteboro	6th in Serie A
Fiorentina	Florence	Stadio Gino Bozzi	4th in Serie A
Hellas Verona	Verona	Sinergy Stadium	9th in Serie A
Internazionale	Milan	Stadio Felice Chinetti	8th in Serie A
Juventus	Turin	Juventus Center (Vinovo)	Champions
Lazio	Rome	Centro sportivo di Formello	1st in Serie B
Milan	Milan	Centro Sportivo Vismara	2nd in Serie A
Napoli	Naples	Stadio Caduti di Brema	10th in Serie A
Pomigliano	Pomigliano	Stadio Ugo Gobbato	2nd in Serie B
Roma	Rome	Stadio Tre Fontane	5th in Serie A
Sampdoria	Genoa	Centro sportivo Gloriano Mugnaini	Florentia's license
Sassuolo	Sassuolo	Stadio Enzo Ricci	3rd in Serie A

== Format ==
Teams play each other twice for a total of 22 games. Three teams get relegated, because the next season will see a change of format and only ten teams in the league. This is an effort to professionalize the league.

== League table ==
Pos	Team	Pld	W	D	L	GF	GA	GD	Pts	Qualification or relegation
1	Juventus (C)	22	19	2	1	57	14	+43	59	Qualification to Champions League first round
2	Roma	22	17	3	2	60	18	+42	54	Qualification to Champions League first round
3	Milan	22	14	4	4	51	19	+32	46	
4	Sassuolo	22	13	4	5	44	24	+20	43	
5	Internazionale	22	12	2	8	42	30	+12	38	
6	Sampdoria	22	10	1	11	29	41	−12	31	
7	Fiorentina	22	7	3	12	40	38	+2	24	
8	Pomigliano	22	7	2	13	25	46	−21	23	
9	Empoli	22	6	5	11	26	40	−14	23	
10	Napoli (R)	22	5	4	13	17	30	−13	19	Relegation to Serie B
11	Lazio (R)	22	3	4	15	25	60	−35	13	Relegation to Serie B
12	Verona (R)	22	1	2	19	14	70	−56	5	Relegation to Serie B

Source: FIGC
Rules for classification: 1) Points; 2) Goal difference; 3) Number of goals scored; 4) Head-to-head points; 5) Head-to-head goal difference; 6) Head-to-head away goals scored
(C) Champions; (R) Relegated

== Results ==
Home \ Away	EMP	FIO	INT	JUV	LAZ	MIL	NAP	POM	ROM	SAM	SAS	VER
Empoli	—	1–1	1–4	2–1	2–0	0–3	1–3	1–2	0–3	2–2	1–1	3–1
Fiorentina	6–0	—	2–3	0–3	2–2	0–1	0–2	3–1	2–3	4–2	1–6	6–0
Internazionale	3–2	2–0	—	1–2	1–0	0–3	1–1	0–1	1–0	4–3	2–2	5–0
Juventus	1–0	2–2	3–1	—	5–0	5–2	2–0	3–0	1–1	3–1	3–1	3–0
Lazio	0–0	1–6	1–3	1–5	—	1–8	3–4	1–2	0–3	1–2	3–1	1–0
Milan	1–0	2–0	0–3	1–2	3–1	—	1–1	6–2	1–1	4–0	0–2	4–0
Napoli	0–1	1–0	0–3	0–2	0–1	0–1	—	1–3	0–1	0–1	0–1	2–1
Pomigliano	2–2	0–1	2–0	0–5	1–1	0–2	2–1	—	1–2	0–1	0–3	2–1
Roma	2–1	1–0	2–0	1–2	3–2	1–1	4–1	5–2	—	8–0	2–0	7–1
Sampdoria	1–3	2–0	3–0	0–1	2–1	0–1	1–0	1–0	1–2	—	1–3	3–1
Sassuolo	3–2	2–1	2–1	0–2	3–0	0–0	0–0	4–2	0–3	2–0	—	4–0
Hellas Verona	0–1	1–3	0–4	0–1	4–4	0–6	0–0	2–0	1–5	1–2	0–4	—

Source: FIGC
Legend: Blue = home team win; Yellow = draw; Red = away team win.

== Season's statistics ==
=== Topscorers ===
Rank	Player	Club	Goals
1	(Italy) Daniela Sabatino	Fiorentina	15
2	(Scotland) Lana Clelland	Sassuolo	11
3	(Italy) Valentina Giacinti	Fiorentina	10
3	(France) Lindsey Thomas	Milan	10
3	(Italy) Tatiana Bonetti	Internazionale	10
3	(Spain) Paloma Lázaro	Roma	10

=== Assists ===
Rank	Player	Club	Assists
1	(Colombia) Yoreli Rincón	Sampdoria	9
2	(Italy) Manuela Giugliano	Roma	8
3	(Italy) Linda Tucceri Cimini	Milan	7

== Awards ==
=== Seasonal awards ===
Award	Winner	Club	Ref.
Best Goalkeeper	(Belgium) Diede Lemey	Sassuolo	
Best Defender	(Italy) Lisa Boattin	Juventus	
Best Midfielder	(Brazil) Andressa Alves	Roma	
Best Forward	(Italy) Daniela Sabatino	Fiorentina	
Best Young Player	(Suriname) Chanté Dompig	Empoli	
Most Valuable Player	(Italy) Lisa Boattin	Juventus	
