= 2021–22 Coppa Italia (women) =

Football tournament season

2021–22 Italian Women's Cup
Tournament details
- Teams: 24 + 2 (in preliminary round)

Final positions
- Champions: Juventus
- Runners-up: Roma

Tournament statistics
- Matches played: 37 + 4
- Goals scored: 141 (7.81 per match)

The 2021–22 Italian Women's Cup (Coppa Italia di calcio femminile) was the 50th edition of the Italian women's football national cup. The 2022 Coppa Italia was won by Juventus after beating Roma in the final.

== Final ==
22 May 2022

Juventus	2–1	Roma

Stadio Paolo Mazza, Ferrara
