= 2019–20 Juventus FC (women) season =

Juventus
2019–20 season
- Chairman: Andrea Agnelli
- Head coach: Rita Guarino
- Stadium: Juventus Training Center
- Serie A: 1st
- Coppa Italia (women): Not concluded
- Supercoppa Italiana (women): 1st
- UEFA Women's Champions League: Round of 16
- Top goalscorer: League: Cristiana Girelli (16); All: Cristiana Girelli (17)
Home colours	Away colours	Third colours

The 2019–20 season was the 3rd season of Juventus and the club's 3rd consecutive season in the top flight of Italian women's football. In addition to the domestic league, Juventus participated in this season's editions of the Coppa Italia, the Supercoppa Italiana, and the UEFA Champions League. Due to the COVID-19 pandemic in Italy, the season was terminated on 8 June 2020, and on 25 June, Juventus was awarded with the league championship title by the Italian Football Federation (FIGC) having been the unbeaten first placed team in the competition until the lockdown.

== Players ==
As of 2 January 2020

Note: Flags indicate national team as defined under FIFA eligibility rules; some limited exceptions apply. Players may hold more than one non-FIFA nationality.

No.	Pos.	Nation	Player
1	GK	ITA	Laura Giuliani
2	DF	FIN	Tuija Hyyrynen
3	DF	ITA	Sara Gama (captain)
4	MF	ITA	Aurora Galli
5	MF	POL	Aleksandra Sikora
6	MF	ITA	Michela Franco
7	MF	ITA	Valentina Cernoia
8	MF	ITA	Martina Rosucci
9	FW	ENG	Eniola Aluko (Note: Transferred during the season)
10	FW	ITA	Cristiana Girelli
11	FW	ITA	Barbara Bonansea
13	DF	ITA	Lisa Boattin

No.	Pos.	Nation	Player
14	MF	DEN	Sofie Junge Pedersen
15	DF	ITA	Vanessa Panzeri
17	FW	SWE	Andrea Stašková
19	MF	FRA	Annahita Zamanian
20	FW	BRA	Maria Alves
21	MF	ITA	Arianna Caruso
22	FW	ITA	Asia Bragnozzi
23	DF	ITA	Cecilia Salvai
32	DF	SWE	Linda Sembrant
33	DF	ITA	Michela Giordano
42	GK	CRO	Doris Bačić
46	GK	ITA	Sabrina Tasselli

== Serie A ==
Date	Opponent	Venue	Result	Scorers
14 September 2019	Empoli	Home	2–1	Girelli 55' Caruso 71'
21 September 2019	Sassuolo	Away	1–3	Aluko 45' Girelli 75' 78' (2) (pen.)
13 October 2019	Florentia S.G.	Home	3–1	Girelli 18' Sembrant 52' Alves 70'
20 October 2019	Internazionale	Away	0–3	Rosucci 23' Girelli 30' Cernoia 89'
2 November 2019	Hellas Verona	Home	3–0	Girelli 3' 88' Alves 64'
17 November 2019	AC Milan	Away	2–2	Fusetti 20' (o.g.) Stašková 81'
24 November 2019	Roma	Away	0–4	Alves 30' Girelli 64' Rosucci 86' Caruso 90+2'
7 December 2019	Orobibica	Away	1–7	Cernoia 6' Rosucci 18' 26' (2) Pedersen 20' Bonansea 31' Zanoli (o.g.) 40' Girelli 88'
14 December 2019	Pink Bari	Home	2–0	Cernoia 19' Galli 40'
12 January 2020	Tavagnacco	Away	1–5	Girelli 33' (pen.) Rosucci 35' Alves 54' Zamanian 82' Cernoia 85'
19 January 2020	Empoli	Away	1–2	Girelli 18' Cernoia 56'
25 January 2020	Sassuolo	Home	2–1	Girelli 10' Pedersen 66'
1 February 2020	Florentia S.G.	Away	0–0	
16 February 2020	Internazionale	Home	5–1	Bonansea 43' Cernoia 56' Girelli 77' 90' (pen.) (2) Sembrant 84'
22 February 2020	Hellas Verona	Away	0–4	Hyyrynen 45+1 Girelli 70' Pedersen 81' Stašková 84'

== Coppa Italia ==
Date	Tie	Opponent	Venue	Result	Scorers
11 December 2019	Round of 16	ChievoVerona	Away	0–8	Caruso 18' Bragonzi (3) 30' 45' 90' Belluci 41' Salvai 57' Alves 58' Giordano 85'
9 February 2020	Quarter final	Empoli	Away	0–6	Stašková (3) 7' 42' 65' Gama 45' Zamanian 75' Sembrant 79'
26 February 2020	Quarter-final	Empoli	Home	Not played	

== Champions League ==
Date	Tie	Opponent	Venue	Result	Scorers
11 September 2019	Round of 32	(Spain) Barcelona	Home	0–2	
25 September 2019	Round of 32	(Spain) Barcelona	Away	2–1	Stašková 79'

== Supercoppa Italiana ==
Date	Opponent	Venue	Result	Scorers
27 October 2019	Fiorentina	Home	2–0	Girelli 12' Stašková 90+2'

== See also ==
- 2019–20 Juventus F.C. season
- 2019–20 Juventus F.C. Under-23 season
