= 2020–21 in Italian football =

Football in Italy
- Season: 2020–21

Men's football
- Serie A: Internazionale
- Serie B: Empoli
- Coppa Italia: Juventus
- Supercoppa Italiana: Juventus

Women's football
- Serie A: Juventus
- Coppa Italia: Roma
- Supercoppa Italiana: Juventus

The 2020–21 season was the 119th season of competitive football in Italy.

== National teams ==
=== Men ===
==== Italy national football team ====
===== Friendlies =====
7 October 2020	Italy	6–0	Moldova	Parma, Italy
20:45 CEST (UTC+02:00)	Cristante 18'; Caputo 23'; El Shaarawy 30', 45+1'; Posmac 37' (o.g.); Berardi 72'	Report		Stadium: Stadio Ennio Tardini; Attendance: 0 Referee: Daniel Siebert (Germany)

11 November 2020	Italy	4–0	Estonia	Florence, Italy
20:45 CET (UTC+01:00)	Grifo 14', 75' (pen.); Bernardeschi 27'; Orsolini 86' (pen.)	Report		Stadium: Stadio Artemio Franchi; Attendance: 0 Referee: Rade Obrenovič (Slovenia)

28 May 2021	Italy	7–0	San Marino	Cagliari, Italy
20:45 CEST (UTC+02:00)	Bernardeschi 32'; Ferrari 34'; Politano 49', 77'; Belotti 67'; Pessina 75', 87'	Report		Stadium: Sardegna Arena; Attendance: 500; Referee: Trustin Farrugia Cann (Malta)

4 June 2021	Italy	4–0	Czech Republic	Bologna, Italy
20:45 CEST (UTC+02:00)	Immobile 23'; Barella 42'; Insigne 66'; Berardi 73'	Report		Stadium: Stadio Renato Dall'Ara; Attendance: 0 Referee: Lionel Tschudi (Switzerland)

===== 2020–21 UEFA Nations League A =====
====== Group 1 ======
Pos	Team	Pld	W	D	L	GF	GA	GD	Pts	Qualification or relegation	(Italy)	(Netherlands)	(Poland)	(Bosnia and Herzegovina)
1	Italy	6	3	3	0	7	2	+5	12	Qualification for Nations League Finals	—	1–1	2–0	1–1
2	Netherlands	6	3	2	1	7	4	+3	11		0–1	—	1–0	3–1
3	Poland	6	2	1	3	6	6	0	7		0–0	1–2	—	3–0
4	Bosnia and Herzegovina (R)	6	0	2	4	3	11	−8	2	Relegation to League B	0–2	0–0	1–2	—

Source: UEFA
Rules for classification: Tiebreakers
(R) Relegated

4 September 2020	Italy	1–1	Bosnia and Herzegovina	Florence, Italy
20:45 CEST (UTC+02:00)	Sensi 67'	Report	Džeko 57'	Stadium: Stadio Artemio Franchi; Attendance: 0 (Note: Due to the COVID-19 pandemic in Europe, all matches scheduled for September 2020 were played behind closed doors.); Referee: Anastasios Sidiropoulos (Greece)

7 September 2020	Netherlands	0–1	Italy	Amsterdam, Netherlands
20:45 CEST (UTC+02:00)		Report	Barella 45+1'	Stadium: Johan Cruyff Arena; Attendance: 0 Referee: Felix Brych (Germany)

11 October 2020	Poland	0–0	Italy	Gdańsk, Poland
20:45 CEST (UTC+02:00)		Report		Stadium: Stadion Energa Gdańsk; Attendance: 9,200; Referee: José María Sánchez Martínez (Spain)

14 October 2020	Italy	1–1	Netherlands	Bergamo, Italy
20:45 CEST (UTC+02:00)	Pellegrini 16'	Report	Van de Beek 25'	Stadium: Stadio Atleti Azzurri d'Italia; Attendance: 623; Referee: Anthony Taylor (England)

15 November 2020	Italy	2–0	Poland	Rome, Italy
20:45 CET (UTC+01:00)	Jorginho 27' (pen.); Berardi 83'	Report		Stadium: Stadio Olimpico; Attendance: 0 Referee: Clément Turpin (France)

18 November 2020	Bosnia and Herzegovina	0–2	Italy	Zenica, Bosnia and Herzegovina
20:45 CET (UTC+01:00)		Report	Belotti 22'; Berardi 68'	Stadium: Bilino Polje; Attendance: 0 Referee: Artur Soares Dias (Portugal)

===== 2022 FIFA World Cup qualification =====
====== Group C ======
Pos	Team	Pld	W	D	L	GF	GA	GD	Pts	Qualification	Switzerland	Italy		Bulgaria	Lithuania
1	Switzerland	8	5	3	0	15	2	+13	18	Qualification for 2022 FIFA World Cup	—	0–0	2–0	4–0	1–0
2	Italy	8	4	4	0	13	2	+11	16	Advance to play-offs	1–1	—	2–0	1–1	5–0
3	Northern Ireland	8	2	3	3	6	7	−1	9		0–0	0–0	—	0–0	1–0
4	Bulgaria	8	2	2	4	6	14	−8	8		1–3	0–2	2–1	—	1–0
5	Lithuania	8	1	0	7	4	19	−15	3		0–4	0–2	1–4	3–1	—

Source: FIFA, UEFA
Rules for classification: Tiebreakers

25 March 2021	Italy	2–0	Northern Ireland	Parma, Italy
20:45	Berardi 14'; Immobile 39'	Report		Stadium: Stadio Ennio Tardini; Attendance: 0 Referee: Ali Palabıyık (Turkey)

28 March 2021	Bulgaria	0–2	Italy	Sofia, Bulgaria
20:45		Report	Belotti 43' (pen.); Locatelli 83'	Stadium: Vasil Levski National Stadium; Attendance: 0 Referee: Slavko Vinčić (Slovenia)

31 March 2021	Lithuania	0–2	Italy	Vilnius, Lithuania
20:45		Report	Sensi 48'; Immobile 90+4' (pen.)	Stadium: LFF Stadium; Attendance: 0 Referee: Paweł Raczkowski (Poland)

===== UEFA Euro 2020 =====
====== Group A ======
Pos	Team	Pld	W	D	L	GF	GA	GD	Pts	Qualification
1	Italy (H)	3	3	0	0	7	0	+7	9	Advance to knockout stage
2	Wales	3	1	1	1	3	2	+1	4 (Note: Tied on head-to-head result (Wales 1–1 Switzerland). Overall goal difference was used as the tiebreaker.)	Advance to knockout stage
3	Switzerland	3	1	1	1	4	5	−1	4	Advance to knockout stage
4	Turkey	3	0	0	3	1	8	−7	0	

Source: UEFA
(H) Hosts
Notes:

11 June 2021	Turkey	0–3	Italy	Rome, Italy
21:00		Report	Demiral 53' (o.g.); Immobile 66'; Insigne 79'	Stadium: Stadio Olimpico; Attendance: 12,916; Referee: Danny Makkelie (Netherlands)

16 June 2021	Italy	3–0	Switzerland	Rome, Italy
21:00	Locatelli 26', 52'; Immobile 89'	Report		Stadium: Stadio Olimpico; Attendance: 12,445; Referee: Sergei Karasev (Russia)

20 June 2021	Italy	1–0	Wales	Rome, Italy
18:00	Pessina 39'	Report		Stadium: Stadio Olimpico; Attendance: 11,541; Referee: Ovidiu Hațegan (Romania)

====== Knockout phase ======
26 June 2021 R16	Italy	2–1 (a.e.t.)	Austria	London, England
21:00 CEST (20:00 UTC+1)	Chiesa 95'; Pessina 105'	Report	Kalajdžić 114'	Stadium: Wembley Stadium; Attendance: 18,910; Referee: Anthony Taylor (England)

=== Women ===
==== Italy women's national football team ====
===== Friendlies =====
10 April 2021	Italy	1–0	Iceland	Coverciano, Italy
16:00	Caruso 72'	Report		Stadium: Centro Tecnico Federale; Attendance: 0

13 April 2021	Italy	1–1	Iceland	Coverciano, Italy
	Giacinti 1'	Report	Vilhjálmsdóttir 40'	Stadium: Centro Tecnico Federale

10 June 2021	Italy	1–0	Netherlands	Ferrara, Italy
17:30	Girelli 14' (pen.)			Stadium: Stadio Paolo Mazza; Referee: Monika Mularczyk (Poland)

14 June 2021	Austria	2–3	Italy	Wiener Neustadt, Austria
16:30	Billa 12'; Wenninger 62'		Soffia 3', 53'; Linari 76' (pen.)	Stadium: Wiener Neustadt Arena; Referee: Riem Hussein (Germany)

===== UEFA Women's Euro 2021 qualifying =====
====== Group B ======
Pos	Team	Pld	W	D	L	GF	GA	GD	Pts	Qualification	Denmark	Italy	Bosnia and Herzegovina	Malta	Israel	Georgia
1	Denmark	10	9	1	0	48	1	+47	28	Final tournament	—	0–0	2–0	8–0	4–0	14–0
2	Italy	10	8	1	1	37	5	+32	25	Final tournament	1–3	—	2–0	5–0	12–0	6–0
3	Bosnia and Herzegovina	10	6	0	4	19	17	+2	18		0–4	0–5	—	2–0	1–0	7–1
4	Malta	10	3	1	6	11	30	−19	10		0–8	0–2	2–3	—	1–1	2–1
5	Israel	10	2	1	7	10	30	−20	7		0–3	2–3	1–3	0–2	—	4–0
6	Georgia	10	0	0	10	3	45	−42	0		0–2	0–1	0–3	0–4	1–2	—

Source: UEFA
Rules for classification: Tiebreakers

22 September 2020	Bosnia and Herzegovina	0–5	Italy	Zenica, Bosnia and Herzegovina
		Report	Galli 19'; Girelli 40', 56' (pen.), 65' (pen.); Linari 88'	Stadium: Bosnia and Herzegovina FA Training Centre; Attendance: 0 Referee: Silvia Domingos (Portugal)

27 October 2020	Italy	1–3	Denmark	Empoli, Italy
	Giacinti 60'	Report	N. Sørensen 6'; Nadim 17', 47'	Stadium: Stadio Carlo Castellani; Referee: Cheryl Foster (Wales)

1 December 2020	Denmark	0–0	Italy	Viborg, Denmark
17:15		Report		Stadium: Viborg Stadium

24 February 2021	Italy	12–0	Israel	Florence, Italy
17:30	Giacinti 3', 13'; Bonansea 5', 81'; David 19' (o.g.); Girelli 30'; Salvai 44'; Rosucci 45+2' (pen.); Sabatino 55' (pen.), 70'; Caruso 67'; Giugliano 90+1'	Report		Stadium: Stadio Artemio Franchi; Attendance: 0 Referee: Ivana Martinčić (Croatia)

===== 2023 FIFA Women's World Cup qualification =====
====== Group G ======
Pos	Team	Pld	W	D	L	GF	GA	GD	Pts	Qualification	(Italy)	(Switzerland)	(Romania)	(Croatia)	(Lithuania)	(Moldova)
1	Italy	10	9	0	1	40	2	+38	27	2023 FIFA Women's World Cup	—	1–2	2–0	3–0	7–0	3–0
2	Switzerland	10	8	1	1	44	4	+40	25	Play-offs	0–1	—	2–0	5–0	4–1	15–0
3	Romania	10	6	1	3	21	11	+10	19		0–5	1–1	—	2–0	3–0	3–0
4	Croatia	10	3	1	6	6	18	−12	10		0–5	0–2	0–1	—	0–0	4–0
5	Lithuania	10	1	2	7	7	35	−28	5		0–5	0–7	1–7	0–1	—	4–0
6	Moldova	10	0	1	9	1	49	−48	1		0–8	0–6	0–4	0–1	1–1	—

Source: UEFA
Rules for classification: Tiebreakers

17 September 2021	Italy	3–0	Moldova	Trieste, Italy
17:30	Girelli 16', 28' (pen.); Giacinti 35'	Report (UEFA)		Stadium: Stadio Nereo Rocco; Referee: Lorraine Watson (Scotland)

21 September 2021	Croatia	0–5	Italy	Karlovac, Croatia
18:00		Report (UEFA)	Gama 17'; Giacinti 31', 47'; Girelli 50'; Cernoia 90+1' (pen.)	Stadium: Stadion Branko Čavlović-Čavlek; Referee: Marta Huerta De Aza (Spain)

22 October 2021	Italy	v	Croatia	Castel di Sangro, Italy
		Report (UEFA)		Stadium: Stadio Teofilo Patini

26 October 2021	Lithuania	v	Italy	Vilnius, Lithuania
		Report (UEFA)		Stadium: LFF Stadium

26 November 2021	Italy	v	Switzerland
		Report (UEFA)

30 November 2021	Romania	v	Italy
		Report (UEFA)

8 April 2022	Italy	v	Lithuania
		Report (UEFA)

12 April 2022	Switzerland	v	Italy
		Report (UEFA)

== League season ==
=== Men ===
==== Promotions and relegations (pre-season) ====
Teams promoted to Serie A

- Benevento
- Crotone
- Spezia

Teams relegated from Serie A

- SPAL
- Brescia
- Lecce

Teams promoted to Serie B

- Monza
- Vicenza
- Reggina
- Reggiana

Teams relegated from Serie B

- Perugia
- Trapani
- Juve Stabia
- Livorno

==== Serie A ====
Pos	Team	Pld	W	D	L	GF	GA	GD	Pts	Qualification or relegation
1	Inter Milan (C)	38	28	7	3	89	35	+54	91	Qualification for Champions League group stage
2	Milan	38	24	7	7	74	41	+33	79	Qualification for Champions League group stage
3	Atalanta	38	23	9	6	90	47	+43	78 (Note: Atalanta finished ahead of Juventus on head-to-head points: Juventus 1–1 Atalanta, Atalanta 1–0 Juventus.)	Qualification for Champions League group stage
4	Juventus	38	23	9	6	77	38	+39	78	Qualification for Champions League group stage
5	Napoli	38	24	5	9	86	41	+45	77	Qualification for Europa League group stage (Note: Since the winners of the 2020–21 Coppa Italia, Juventus, qualified for the Champions League, the Europa League berth awarded to the Coppa Italia winners was passed to the sixth-placed team, and the Europa Conference League berth awarded to the sixth-placed team was passed to the seventh-placed team.)
6	Lazio	38	21	5	12	61	55	+6	68	Qualification for Europa League group stage
7	Roma	38	18	8	12	68	58	+10	62	Qualification for Conference League play-off round
8	Sassuolo	38	17	11	10	64	56	+8	62	
9	Sampdoria	38	15	7	16	52	54	−2	52	
10	Hellas Verona	38	11	12	15	46	48	−2	45	
11	Genoa	38	10	12	16	47	58	−11	42	
12	Bologna	38	10	11	17	51	65	−14	41	
13	Fiorentina	38	9	13	16	47	59	−12	40	
14	Udinese	38	10	10	18	42	58	−16	40	
15	Spezia	38	9	12	17	52	72	−20	39	
16	Cagliari	38	9	10	19	43	59	−16	37	
17	Torino	38	7	16	15	50	69	−19	37	
18	Benevento (R)	38	7	12	19	40	75	−35	33	Relegation to Serie B
19	Crotone (R)	38	6	5	27	45	92	−47	23	Relegation to Serie B
20	Parma (R)	38	3	11	24	39	83	−44	20	Relegation to Serie B

Source: Serie A, Soccerway
Rules for classification: 1) Points; 2) Head-to-head points; 3) Head-to-head goal difference; 4) Goal difference; 5) Goals scored; 6) Draw. (Note: Head-to-head record is used only after all the matches between the teams in question have been played)
(C) Champions; (R) Relegated

==== Serie B ====
Pos	Team	Pld	W	D	L	GF	GA	GD	Pts	Promotion, qualification or relegation
1	Empoli (C, P)	38	19	16	3	68	35	+33	73	Promotion to Serie A
2	Salernitana (P)	38	19	12	7	46	34	+12	69	Promotion to Serie A
3	Monza	38	17	13	8	51	33	+18	64	Qualification for promotion play-offs semi-finals
4	Lecce	38	16	14	8	68	47	+21	62	Qualification for promotion play-offs semi-finals
5	Venezia (O, P)	38	15	14	9	53	39	+14	59	Qualification for promotion play-offs preliminary round
6	Cittadella	38	15	12	11	48	35	+13	57	Qualification for promotion play-offs preliminary round
7	Brescia	38	15	11	12	61	53	+8	56 (Note: Head-to-head points: Brescia 9, Chievo 5, SPAL 2.)	Qualification for promotion play-offs preliminary round
8	Chievo (D, R)	38	14	14	10	50	37	+13	56	Bankruptcy
9	SPAL	38	14	14	10	44	42	+2	56	
10	Frosinone	38	12	14	12	38	42	−4	50 (Note: Frosinone finished ahead of Reggina on head-to-head points: Frosinone 1–1 Reggina, Reggina 0–4 Frosinone.)	
11	Reggina	38	12	14	12	42	45	−3	50	
12	Vicenza	38	11	15	12	48	53	−5	48 (Note: Head-to-head points: Vicenza 8, Cremonese 4, Pisa 3.)	
13	Cremonese	38	12	12	14	46	44	+2	48	
14	Pisa	38	11	15	12	54	59	−5	48	
15	Pordenone	38	10	15	13	40	39	+1	45	
16	Ascoli (Note: Since the 16th-placed team Ascoli finished more than 4 points ahead of the 17th-placed team Cosenza, the relegation play-out was not played and Cosenza were originally relegated directly. However, Cosenza was ultimately spared from relegation following Chievo's bankruptcy and subsequent dissolution.)	38	11	11	16	37	48	−11	44	
17	Cosenza (T)	38	6	17	15	29	47	−18	35	Spared from relegation
18	Reggiana (R)	38	9	7	22	31	57	−26	34	Relegation to Serie C
19	Pescara (R)	38	7	11	20	29	60	−31	32	Relegation to Serie C
20	Virtus Entella (R)	38	4	11	23	30	64	−34	23	Relegation to Serie C

Source: Lega Serie B (in Italian), Soccerway (in English)
Rules for classification: 1) Points; 2) Head-to-head points; 3) Head-to-head goal difference; 4) Goal difference; 5) Goals scored; 6) Draw.
(C) Champions; (D) Disqualified; (O) Play-off winners; (P) Promoted; (R) Relegated; (T) Qualified, but not yet for the particular phase indicated

==== Serie C ====
Group A (North & Central West)

Pos	Team	Pld	Pts
1	Como (C, P)	38	75
2	Alessandria (O, P)	38	68
3	Renate	38	65
4	Pro Vercelli	38	63
5	Pro Patria	38	61
6	Lecco	38	60
7	AlbinoLeffe	38	57
8	Pontedera	38	55
9	Grosseto	38	54
10	Juventus U23	38	52
11	Novara (D, R)	38	49
12	Piacenza	38	49
13	Olbia	38	47
14	Giana Erminio	38	44
15	Pergolettese	38	44
16	Carrarese	38	44
17	Pro Sesto	38	43
18	Pistoiese	38	31
19	Lucchese	38	31
20	Livorno (R)	38	29

Source: Lega Pro (in Italian), Soccerway (in English)
(C) Champions;
(D) Disqualified;
(O) Play-off winners;
(P) Promoted;
(R) Relegated
Group B (North & Central East)

Pos	Team	Pld	Pts
1	Perugia (C, P)	38	79
2	Padova	38	79
3	Südtirol	38	75
4	Modena	38	70
5	Feralpisalò	38	60
6	Triestina	38	59
7	Cesena	38	57
8	Matelica	38	56
9	Sambenedettese (D, R)	38	50
10	Mantova	38	49
11	Virtus Verona	38	49
12	Gubbio	38	48
13	Fermana	38	42
14	Vis Pesaro	38	41
15	Carpi (D, R)	38	41
16	Legnago (O)	38	38
17	Imolese (O)	38	35
18	Fano (R)	38	33
19	Ravenna (R)	38	30
20	Arezzo (R)	38	29

Source: Lega Pro (in Italian), Soccerway (in English)
(C) Champions;
(D) Disqualified;
(O) Play-off winners;
(P) Promoted;
(R) Relegated
Group C (Centre & South)

Pos	Team	Pld	Pts
1	Ternana (C, P)	36	90
2	Catanzaro	36	68
3	Avellino	36	68
4	Bari	36	63
5	Juve Stabia	36	61
6	Catania	36	59
7	Palermo	36	53
8	Teramo	36	52
9	Foggia	36	51
10	Casertana (D, R)	36	45
11	Monopoli	36	41
12	Viterbese	36	40
13	Potenza	36	39
14	Turris	36	39
15	Virtus Francavilla	36	38
16	Vibonese	36	36
17	Paganese (O)	36	32
18	Bisceglie (R)	36	30
19	Cavese (R)	36	23
20	Trapani (D)	0	−1

Source: Lega Pro (in Italian), Soccerway (in English)
(C) Champions;
(D) Disqualified;
(O) Play-off winners;
(P) Promoted;
(R) Relegated

=== Women ===
==== Serie A (women) ====
Pos	Team	Pld	W	D	L	GF	GA	GD	Pts	Qualification or relegation
1	Juventus (C)	22	22	0	0	75	10	+65	66	Qualification to Champions League first round
2	Milan	22	16	3	3	47	17	+30	51	Qualification to Champions League first round
3	Sassuolo	22	16	2	4	47	20	+27	50	
4	Fiorentina	22	12	2	8	40	30	+10	38	
5	Roma	22	10	7	5	35	25	+10	37	
6	Empoli	22	9	4	9	47	40	+7	31	
7	Florentia (Note: Florentia were docked 1 point due to a breach of financial agreements.)	22	9	3	10	24	37	−13	29	
8	Internazionale	22	7	4	11	31	44	−13	25	
9	Hellas Verona	22	6	3	13	16	33	−17	21	
10	Napoli	22	3	5	14	22	38	−16	14	
11	San Marino (R)	22	3	3	16	16	58	−42	12	Relegation to Serie B
12	Bari (R)	22	1	0	21	13	61	−48	3	Relegation to Serie B

Source: FIGC (fixtures, ranking)
Rules for classification: 1) Points; 2) Head-to-head points; 3) Head-to-head goal difference; 4) Goal difference; 5) Goals scored; 6) Draw
(C) Champions; (R) Relegated

== Cup competitions ==
=== Coppa Italia ===
==== Final ====
19 May 2021
21:00 CEST

Atalanta	1–2	Juventus
Malinovskyi 41'	Report	Kulusevski 31'; Chiesa 73'

Mapei Stadium – Città del Tricolore, Reggio Emilia
Attendance: 4,300 (Note: The total capacity of the stadium was established at 20% due to the COVID-19 pandemic in Italy.)
Referee: Davide Massa

=== Supercoppa Italiana ===
20 January 2021
21:00 CET

Juventus	2–0	Napoli
Ronaldo 64'; Morata 90+5'	Report

Mapei Stadium – Città del Tricolore, Reggio Emilia
Attendance: 0 (Note: The match was played behind closed doors due to the COVID-19 pandemic in Italy.)
Referee: Paolo Valeri

=== Coppa Italia (women) ===
==== Final ====
30 May 2021

Roma	0–0 (a.e.t.)	Milan
	Report
Penalties
Giugliano (penalty scored); Serturini (penalty scored); Linari (penalty missed); Bernauer (penalty scored)	3–1	Boquete (penalty missed); Agard (penalty scored); Grimshaw (penalty missed); Tucceri Cimini (penalty missed)

Mapei Stadium, Reggio Emilia
Referee: Maria Marotta

=== Supercoppa Italiana (women) ===
==== Final ====
10 January 2021
12:30 CET

Juventus	2–0	Fiorentina
Bonansea 39', 55'	Report

Stadio Comunale, Chiavari
Referee: Maria Marotta

== UEFA competitions ==
=== UEFA Champions League ===
==== Group stage ====
===== Group B =====
Pos	Team	Pld	W	D	L	GF	GA	GD	Pts	Qualification	RMA	BMG	SHK	INT
1	(Spain) Real Madrid	6	3	1	2	11	9	+2	10	Advance to knockout phase	—	2–0	2–3	3–2
2	(Germany) Borussia Mönchengladbach	6	2	2	2	16	9	+7	8 (Note: Head-to-head points: Borussia Mönchengladbach 6, Shakhtar Donetsk 0.)	Advance to knockout phase	2–2	—	4–0	2–3
3	(Ukraine) Shakhtar Donetsk	6	2	2	2	5	12	−7	8	Transfer to Europa League	2–0	0–6	—	0–0
4	(Italy) Inter Milan	6	1	3	2	7	9	−2	6		0–2	2–2	0–0	—

Source: UEFA

===== Group D =====
Pos	Team	Pld	W	D	L	GF	GA	GD	Pts	Qualification	LIV	ATA	AJX	MID
1	(England) Liverpool	6	4	1	1	10	3	+7	13	Advance to knockout phase	—	0–2	1–0	2–0
2	(Italy) Atalanta	6	3	2	1	10	8	+2	11	Advance to knockout phase	0–5	—	2–2	1–1
3	(Netherlands) Ajax	6	2	1	3	7	7	0	7	Transfer to Europa League	0–1	0–1	—	3–1
4	(Denmark) Midtjylland	6	0	2	4	4	13	−9	2		1–1	0–4	1–2	—

Source: UEFA

===== Group F =====
Pos	Team	Pld	W	D	L	GF	GA	GD	Pts	Qualification	DOR	LAZ	BRU	ZEN
1	(Germany) Borussia Dortmund	6	4	1	1	12	5	+7	13	Advance to knockout phase	—	1–1	3–0	2–0
2	(Italy) Lazio	6	2	4	0	11	7	+4	10	Advance to knockout phase	3–1	—	2–2	3–1
3	(Belgium) Club Brugge	6	2	2	2	8	10	−2	8	Transfer to Europa League	0–3	1–1	—	3–0
4	(Russia) Zenit Saint Petersburg	6	0	1	5	4	13	−9	1		1–2	1–1	1–2	—

Source: UEFA

===== Group G =====
Pos	Team	Pld	W	D	L	GF	GA	GD	Pts	Qualification	JUV	BAR	DKV	FER
1	(Italy) Juventus	6	5	0	1	14	4	+10	15 (Note: Tied on head-to-head points (3). Head-to-head goal difference: Juventus +1, Barcelona –1.)	Advance to knockout phase	—	0–2	3–0	2–1
2	(Spain) Barcelona	6	5	0	1	16	5	+11	15	Advance to knockout phase	0–3	—	2–1	5–1
3	(Ukraine) Dynamo Kyiv	6	1	1	4	4	13	−9	4	Transfer to Europa League	0–2	0–4	—	1–0
4	(Hungary) Ferencváros	6	0	1	5	5	17	−12	1		1–4	0–3	2–2	—

Source: UEFA

==== Knockout phase ====
===== Round of 16 =====
Team 1	Agg.	Team 2	1st leg	2nd leg
Lazio (Italy)	2–6	(Germany) Bayern Munich	1–4	1–2
Porto (Portugal)	4–4 (a)	(Italy) Juventus	2–1	2–3
Atalanta (Italy)	1–4	(Spain) Real Madrid	0–1	1–3

=== UEFA Europa League ===
==== UEFA Europa League qualifying phase and play-off round ====
===== Second qualifying round =====
Team 1	Score	Team 2
Shamrock Rovers (Republic of Ireland)	0–2	(Italy) Milan

===== Third qualifying round =====
Team 1	Score	Team 2
Milan (Italy)	3–2	(Norway) Bodø/Glimt

===== Play-off round =====
Team 1	Score	Team 2
Rio Ave (Portugal)	2–2 (a.e.t.) (8–9 p)	(Italy) Milan

==== Group stage ====
===== Group A =====
Pos	Team	Pld	W	D	L	GF	GA	GD	Pts	Qualification	ROM	YB	CLJ	CSS
1	(Italy) Roma	6	4	1	1	13	5	+8	13	Advance to knockout phase	—	3–1	5–0	0–0
2	(Switzerland) Young Boys	6	3	1	2	9	7	+2	10	Advance to knockout phase	1–2	—	2–1	3–0
3	(Romania) CFR Cluj	6	1	2	3	4	10	−6	5 (Note: Head-to-head points: CFR Cluj 4, CSKA Sofia 1.)		0–2	1–1	—	0–0
4	(Bulgaria) CSKA Sofia	6	1	2	3	3	7	−4	5		3–1	0–1	0–2	—

Source: UEFA

===== Group F =====
Pos	Team	Pld	W	D	L	GF	GA	GD	Pts	Qualification	NAP	RSO	AZ	RJK
1	(Italy) Napoli	6	3	2	1	7	4	+3	11	Advance to knockout phase	—	1–1	0–1	2–0
2	(Spain) Real Sociedad	6	2	3	1	5	4	+1	9	Advance to knockout phase	0–1	—	1–0	2–2
3	(Netherlands) AZ	6	2	2	2	7	5	+2	8		1–1	0–0	—	4–1
4	(Croatia) Rijeka	6	1	1	4	6	12	−6	4		1–2	0–1	2–1	—

Source: UEFA

===== Group H =====
Pos	Team	Pld	W	D	L	GF	GA	GD	Pts	Qualification	MIL	LOSC	SPP	CEL
1	(Italy) Milan	6	4	1	1	12	7	+5	13	Advance to knockout phase	—	0–3	3–0	4–2
2	(France) Lille	6	3	2	1	14	8	+6	11	Advance to knockout phase	1–1	—	2–1	2–2
3	(Czech Republic) Sparta Prague	6	2	0	4	10	12	−2	6		0–1	1–4	—	4–1
4	(Scotland) Celtic	6	1	1	4	10	19	−9	4		1–3	3–2	1–4	—

Source: UEFA

==== Knockout phase ====
===== Round of 32 =====
Team 1	Agg.	Team 2	1st leg	2nd leg
Red Star Belgrade (Serbia)	3–3 (a)	(Italy) Milan	2–2	1–1
Braga (Portugal)	1–5	(Italy) Roma	0–2	1–3
Granada (Spain)	3–2	(Italy) Napoli	2–0	1–2

===== Round of 16 =====
Team 1	Agg.	Team 2	1st leg	2nd leg
Roma (Italy)	5–1	(Ukraine) Shakhtar Donetsk	3–0	2–1
Manchester United (England)	2–1	(Italy) Milan	1–1	1–0

===== Quarter-finals =====
Team 1	Agg.	Team 2	1st leg	2nd leg
Ajax (Netherlands)	2–3	(Italy) Roma	1–2	1–1

===== Semi-finals =====
Team 1	Agg.	Team 2	1st leg	2nd leg
Manchester United (England)	8–5	(Italy) Roma	6–2	2–3

=== UEFA Youth League ===
On 17 February 2021, the UEFA Executive Committee cancelled the tournament.

==== UEFA Champions League Path ====
Team 1	Score	Team 2
Internazionale (Italy)	3 Mar	(Germany) Bayern Munich
Atalanta (Italy)	2 Mar	(Germany) RB Leipzig
Juventus (Italy)	2 Mar	(Germany) Borussia Dortmund
Borussia Mönchengladbach (Germany)	2 Mar	(Italy) Lazio

=== UEFA Women's Champions League ===
==== Knockout phase ====
===== Round of 32 =====
Team 1	Agg.	Team 2	1st leg	2nd leg
Juventus (Italy)	2–6	(France) Lyon	2–3	0–3
Fiorentina (Italy)	3–2	(Czech Republic) Slavia Prague	2–2	1–0

===== Round of 16 =====
Team 1	Agg.	Team 2	1st leg	2nd leg
Manchester City (England)	8–0	(Italy) Fiorentina	3–0	5–0
