= Sofie Junge Pedersen =

Danish footballer (born 1992)

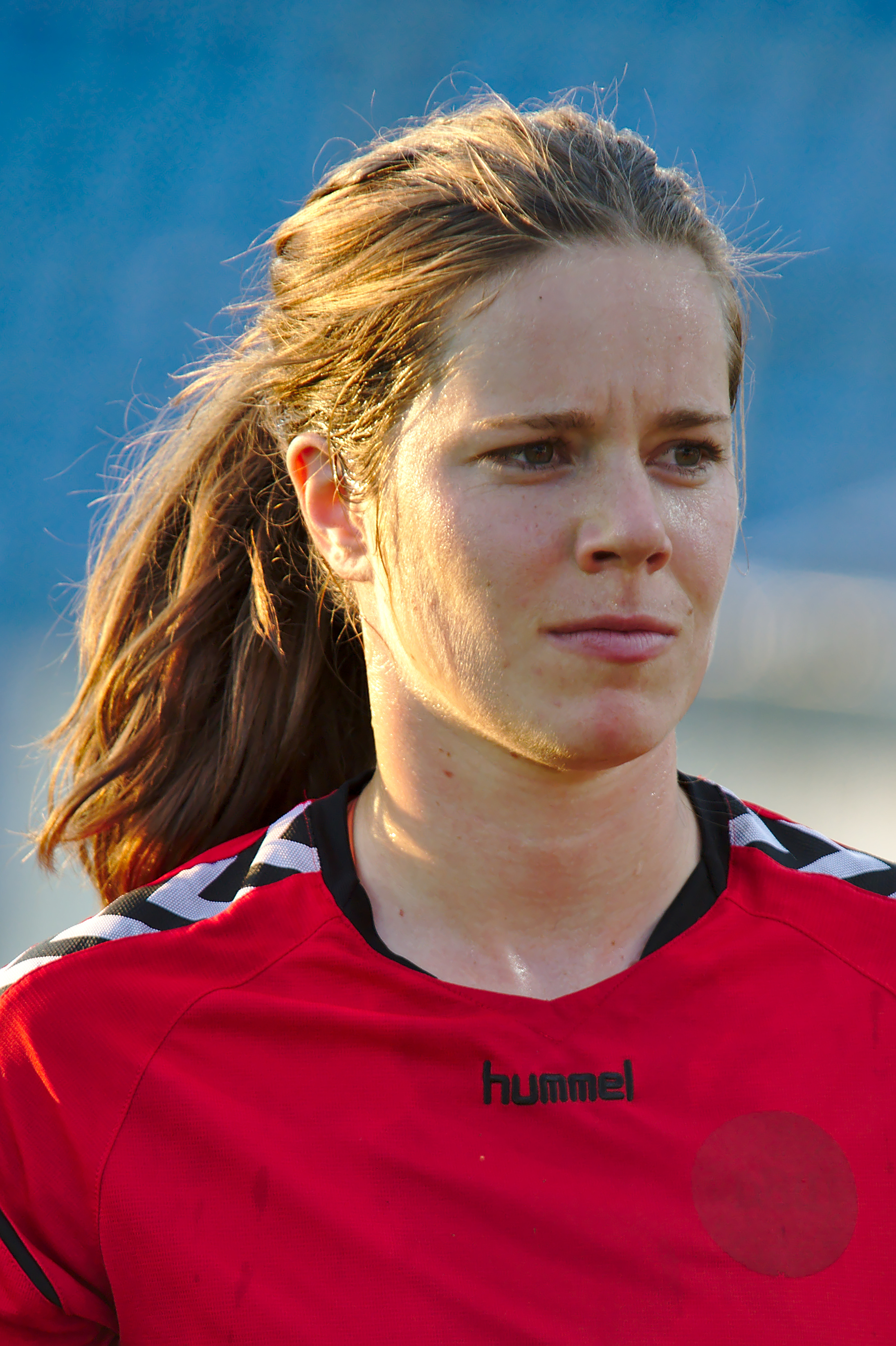
- Junge with Denmark in July 2017

Personal information
- Full name: Sofie Junge Pedersen
- Date of birth: 24 April 1992 (age 34)
- Place of birth: Aarhus, Denmark
- Height: 1.76 m (5 ft 9 in)
- Position: Defensive midfielder

Team information
- Current team: Fortuna Hjørring
- Number: 4

Youth career
- 1999–2006: BMI
- 2007–2009: IK Skovbakken

Senior career*
Years	Team	Apps	(Gls)
2009–2011	IK Skovbakken		
2012–2015	Fortuna Hjørring	95	
2015–2017	FC Rosengård	6	(0)
2017–2018	Levante UD	24	(1)
2018	Vittsjö GIK	11	(1)
2019–2023	Juventus	74	(13)
2023–2025	Internazionale	26	(2)
2025–2026	Badalona	21	(0)
2026–	Fortuna Hjørring	0	(0)

International career^{‡}
2007	Denmark U16	3	(1)
2007–2008	Denmark U17	19	(4)
2010–2012	Denmark U19	25	(5)
2011	Denmark U23	1	(0)
2011–	Denmark	89	(7)
Medal record
Women's football
Representing Denmark
UEFA Women's Championship
Silver medal – second place	2017 Netherlands	Team
- * Club domestic league appearances and goals as of 17:21, 12 July 2026 (UTC) ‡ National team caps and goals as of 03 March 2026

Sofie Junge Pedersen (born 24 April 1992) is a Danish professional footballer who plays as a defensive midfielder for A-Liga club Fortuna Hjørring and the Denmark national team. Junge previously played for Serie A sides Inter Milan and Juventus FC, Danish A-Liga sides IK Skovbakken and Fortuna Hjørring, the latter of which she captained, and Swedish Damallsvenskan side FC Rosengård. In 2024 Junge was named Footballer of the Year by English newspaper The Guardian for her climate and human rights activism in football.

== Club career ==
Junge Pedersen played for IK Skovbakken until 2011 before moving to Fortuna Hjørring. Skovbakken had made Junge Pedersen and fellow youngster Pernille Harder contracted players in April 2010, in recognition of their exceptional potential.

In June 2015, Junge Pedersen signed for FC Rosengård, after impressing the Swedish Damallsvenskan champions while playing against them with Fortuna Hjørring in the UEFA Women's Champions League. During her time at Rosengård, Junge sustained a serious head injury which left her unable to play for the entire 2016 season. In 2017, FC Rosengård chose not to renew her contract and she signed with Levante UD in the Spanish Primera División. At the conclusion of her contract with Levante in July 2018, Junge moved back to Damallsvenskan where she signed with Vittsjö GIK. In December 2018, Junge signed for Juventus Women in Italy. After four and a half years, she left Juventus in July 2023 and signed for Inter Milan. She helped Inter to qualify for UEFA Women's Champions League for the first time in the club's history. In June 2025 she departed Milan after two years and signed with Liga F club Badalona.

Junge returned to former club Fortuna Hjørring in July 2026, signing a one-year contract with the club.

== International career ==
At the inaugural 2008 FIFA U-17 Women's World Cup in New Zealand, Junge Pedersen was part of the Denmark team who won their group before losing 4–0 to eventual champions North Korea in the quarter-final.

In December 2011, Junge Pedersen scored on her senior international debut, a 4–0 win over Chile in São Paulo. She was named in national coach Kenneth Heiner-Møller's Denmark squad for UEFA Women's Euro 2013. In 2017, she was named in Nils Nielsen's squad for UEFA Women's Euro 2017 which saw her get playing time in the final against the Netherlands following Line Sigvardsen Jensen's ACL injury.

== International goals ==
No.	Date	Venue	Opponent	Score	Result	Competition
1.	22 September 2020	Centenary Stadium, Ta'Qali, Malta	Malta	6–0	8–0	UEFA Women's Euro 2022 qualifying
2.	21 October 2020	Viborg Stadium, Viborg, Denmark	Israel	4–0	4–0	UEFA Women's Euro 2022 qualifying

== Personal life ==
As well as being a footballer, Junge Pedersen is a widely read intellectual who identifies as a socialist. Junge and Fortuna Hjørring donated proceeds from the annual Dana Cup to a charity Junge helped establish in Ghana.

== Honours ==
IK Skovbakken

- Danish Women's Cup: 2009

Fortuna Hjørring

- Elitedivisionen: 2013–14

FC Rosengård

- Damallsvenskan: 2015
- Svenska Cupen: 2016
- Svenska Supercupen: 2016

Juventus

- Serie A: 2018–19, 2019–20, 2020–21, 2021–22
- Coppa Italia: 2018–19, 2021–22, 2022–23
- Supercoppa Italiana: 2019, 2020–21, 2021–22
