= Rita Guarino =

Italian footballer and manager

- Guarino in 2026

Personal information
- Full name: Maria Rita Guarino
- Date of birth: 31 January 1971 (age 55)
- Place of birth: Turin, Italy
- Position: Striker

Team information
- Current team: West Ham United

Senior career*
Years	Team	Apps	(Gls)
1985–1992	Juventus Piedmont		
1986–1987	→ Torino (loan)	4	(1)
1992–1993	Reggiana	29	(15)
1993–1996	Fiammamonza	58	(38)
1994–1995	→ Torres (loan)	25	(19)
1996–1998	Cascine Vica	56	(27)
1998–2000	Torres	48	(72)
2000	Maryland Pride	7	(8)
2000–2001	Lazio		
2001–2002	Foroni Verona	23	(35)
2002–2006	Torres		

International career
1991–2004	Italy	99	(35)

Managerial career
- 2008–2015: Italy U17 (assistant)
- 2015–2017: Italy U17
- 2017–2021: Juventus
- 2021–2024: Inter Milan
- 2025–: West Ham United
- * Club domestic league appearances and goals

Maria Rita Guarino (Italian pronunciation: [maˈriːa ˈriːta ɡwaˈriːno]; born 31 January 1971) is an Italian professional football manager and former player who is currently the head coach of Women's Super League club West Ham United. As a player, she represented the Italy national team as a striker.

== Playing career ==
Throughout her career she played as a striker for Juventus, Torino, Reggiana, Fiammamonza, Torres, Lazio and Foroni Verona in Serie A, and Maryland Pride in the W-League.

She was a member of the Italian national team, and took part in the 1991 and 1999 World Cups, and the 1993, 1997 and 2001 European Championships. She scored Italy's last goal in the 1991 World Cup, forcing the extra time in the quarterfinals against Norway. She again scored a goal against Norway in the 2001 Euro.

== Managerial career ==
=== Italy youth ===
Since 2015, Guarino has served as Italy's under-17 national team's assistant manager and Manager of Football – Individual Training System.

=== Juventus ===
On 16 June 2017, Guarino was appointed as head coach of Serie A Femminile club Juventus. She led the team to their first ever Scudetto: both Juventus and Brescia finished the season tied at 60 points at the top of the league, thus making a tie-breaker necessary. On 20 May 2018, Juventus beat Brescia 5–4 after the penalty shoot-out, winning their first championship in their debut season in the league.

In the 2018–19 season, Guarino led Juventus to the victory won their second consecutive league title and their first Coppa Italia. The following campaign, Juventus won their first Supercoppa Italiana and their third consecutive league title. In the 2020–21 season, Juventus won their second Supercoppa Italiana and their fourth consecutive league title, making a perfect season with 22 victories out 22. On 21 May 2021, Guarino announced that she would leave Juventus at end of the season.

=== Inter Milan ===
On 17 June 2021, Guarino was appointed as head coach of Serie A club Inter Milan.

On 29 June 2024, she terminated her contract with the club by mutual consent.

=== West Ham United ===
On 22 December 2025, Guarino was appointed as head coach of Women's Super League side West Ham United, signing an 18-month contract with the club.

== Personal life ==
In 2017, she co-authored the book Train in women's football. Technical, tactical, physical aspects and estimates.

== Career statistics ==
=== Managerial ===
As of matches played 24 October 2026

Managerial record by team and tenure
Team	From	To	Record								Ref
Team	From	To	G	W	D	L	GF	GA	GD	Win %	Ref
Italy U17	September 2015	June 2017	18	7	6	5	35	20	+15	38.89	
Juventus	16 June 2017	23 May 2021	83	74	5	4	255	50	+205	89.16	
Inter Milan	17 June 2021	30 June 2024	70	32	11	27	23	12	+11	45.71	
West Ham United	22 December 2025	Present	23	8	3	12	24	39	−15	34.78	
Total			194	121	25	48	337	121	+216	62.37	

== Honours ==
=== Manager ===
Juventus

- Serie A: 2017–18, 2018–19, 2019–20, 2020–21
- Coppa Italia: 2018–19
- Supercoppa Italiana: 2019, 2020

== Publications ==
- Allenare nel calcio femminile. Aspetti tecnici, tattici, fisici e preventivi. Italy: Sport. 2017. ISBN 978-8898889662.
