= Doris Bačić =

Croatian footballer (born 1995)

Personal information
- Date of birth: 23 February 1995 (age 31)
- Place of birth: Neum, Bosnia and Herzegovina
- Height: 1.85 m (6 ft 1 in)
- Positions: Goalkeeper; Neom SC (women)

Team information
- Current team: Neom SC

Youth career
- ŽNK Libertas

Senior career*
Years	Team	Apps	(Gls)
- ŽNK Ombla
2011–2012	SFK 2000		
2012–2013	ŽNK Osijek		
2013	Arsenal	0	(0)
2014–2015	FC Rosengård	0	(0)
2015–2016	SFK 2000		
2016	SC Sand	0	(0)
2017	Einherji	14	(0)
2017–2018	RSC Anderlecht		
2018–2021	Juventus	18	(0)
2021–2022	Sporting CP		
2022–2023	Levante Las Planas	26	(0)
2023–2026	Napoli	43	(0)
2026	Lazio	0	(0)
2026–	Neom SC	0	(0)

International career^{‡}
2011–	Croatia	69	(0)
- * Club domestic league appearances and goals as of 3 October 2026 (UTC) ‡ National team caps and goals as of 3 October 2026

Doris Bačić (born 23 February 1995) is a professional footballer who plays as a goalkeeper who plays for Saudi Women's Premier League club Neom SC. Born in Bosnia and Herzegovina, she plays for the Croatia national team.

She previously played for FC Rosengård, RSC Anderlecht, Juventus, Napoli, Lazio, Sporting CP and FC Levante Las Planas.

== Career ==
Bačić signed for Arsenal Ladies in summer 2013. She was restricted to training and playing in friendly matches because she was not granted a work permit. Bačić was unhappy at Arsenal and described the club as arrogant. By January 2014 she had quit London and embarked on a trial at Swedish Damallsvenskan champions FC Rosengård.

In July 2016 Bačić left SFK 2000 for German Frauen-Bundesliga outfit SC Sand, but reverted to SFK 2000 the following month. She then spent the 2017 season playing for Einherji of the Icelandic third division. In 2017–18 she represented Super League Vrouwenvoetbal title winners RSC Anderlecht, securing four clean sheets in her six appearances.

On 27 July 2018, Bačić was announced at Juventus.

On 9 August 2021, was announced at Sporting CP.

On 7 August 2023, was announced at Napoli.

== International career ==
Bačić made her international debut against Netherlands on 24 November 2011.

Bačić starred for the Croatia women's national football team in a 3–0 defeat to England at Bescot Stadium, Walsall, in September 2012.

== Honours ==
Juventus

- Serie A: 2018–19, 2019–20, 2020–21
- Coppa Italia: 2018–19
- Supercoppa Italiana: 2019, 2020–21

== See also ==
- List of women's footballers with 100 or more international caps
