= 2025 Supercoppa Italiana (women) =

Supercoppa Italiana Femminile
Italian Women's Supercup
- Event: Supercoppa Italiana
Juventus	Roma
2	1
- Date: 11 January 2026
- Venue: Stadio Adriatico – Giovanni Cornacchia, Pescara
- Referee: Deborah Bianchi

The 2025 Supercopa Italiana Femminile was the 29th edition of the Supercoppa Italiana Femminile, the Italian women's football super cup. The match was held on 11 January 2026 at Stadio Adriatico – Giovanni Cornacchia in Pescara, Abruzzo.

As Juventus won the double in the previous season (having won both the Serie A Femminile and the Coppa Italia Femminile), the match was between Juventus and Coppa Italia runners-up Roma, who also happened to be the reigning champions.

Juventus came from behind and defeated Roma 2–1 in the match, which saw Juventus win their fifth title, and their second cup in the 2025–26 season, having also defeated Roma in the Serie A Women's Cup final.

== Background ==
The Supercoppa Italiana Femminile is contested by the winners of the Serie A Femminile and the winners of the Coppa Italia Femminile. However, as Juventus won the domestic double in the 2024–25 season, they will instead face Coppa Italia runners-up Roma.

Tickets went on sale on 11 December 2025. Tickets were quite cheap, with the tickets costing €5 or just €1 for people aged under 20 or over 65, university students and Delfino Pescara members.

== Teams ==
Team	Method of qualification	Previous appearances^{1}
Juventus	2024–25 Serie A and 2024–25 Coppa Italia winners	6 (2018, 2019, 2020–21, 2021–22, 2022, 2023)
Roma	2024–25 Coppa Italia runners-up	5 (2020–21, 2021–22, 2022, 2023, 2024)

== Match ==
11 January 2026
15:00 CET

Juventus	2–1	Roma
Vangsgaard 40'; Girelli 85'		Giugliano 23'

Stadio Adriatico – Giovanni Cornacchia, Pescara
Referee: Deborah Bianchi
