= Asia Bragonzi =

Italian footballer (born 2001)

Personal information
- Date of birth: 5 March 2001 (age 25)
- Place of birth: Crema, Lombardy, Italy
- Height: 1.71 m (5 ft 7 1/2 in)
- Position: Forward

Team information
- Current team: FC Lumezzane Women
- Number: 9

Youth career
- 2016–2017: Inter Milan

Senior career*
Years	Team	Apps	(Gls)
2017–2018	Inter Milan		
2018–	Juventus	13	(0)
2020–2021	→ Hellas Verona (loan)	15	(6)
2021–2022	→ Empoli (loan)	19	(7)
2022	→ Sassuolo (loan)	5	(0)
2023	→ Pomigliano (loan)	8	(1)
2023	→ Sampdoria (loan)	9	(1)
2025	→ Genoa (loan)	8	(0)
2025–2026	Trabzonspor	8	(3)
2026–	FC Lumezzane Women	0	(0)

International career^{‡}
2016–2018	Italy U17	7	(0)
2019	Italy U19	5	(3)
2021–2024	Italy U23	8	(1)
- * Club domestic league appearances and goals as of 3 October 2026 ‡ National team caps and goals as of 5 February 2025

Asia Bragonzi (born 5 March 2001) is an Italian footballer who plays as a striker for FC Lumezzane Women in the Serie B Women. She has played for Italy U17 team.

== Personal life ==
Asia Bragonzi was orn in Crema, Italy on 5 March 2001. She was raised in Montodine, also in the Province of Cremona.

== Club career ==
Bragonzi began playing at the age of six with her hometown team, Montodinese. After joining the youth sector of Inter Milan and making her debut in the "Nerazzurri" first team, in 2018 she moved to Juventus, where she initially joined the U19 team.

The following year, however, coach Rita Guarino added her to the first team: thus, Bragonzi made her debut both in Serie A, and in Coppa Italia, where she also scored her first goals in the black and white shirt. Despite contributing few appearances, the attacker also put her signature in the victory of two consecutive championships, a national cup and an Italian Super Cup. In the summer of 2020, Bragonzi was sent on loan to Verona. In a difficult Serie A season for the yellow-blue team, the presence of the center-forward, who finished the championship as the team's top scorer with six goals in 15 games, proved to be fundamental in achieving salvation. In December 2020, she was elected European Golden Girl of the year, a football award established by Tuttosport in 2018 and awarded every year to the best U21 player in the top flight European championship.

After her experience at Verona, Bragonzi was sent on loan to Empoli Ladies Football for Empoli in the 2021–22 season, and replaced leaving Elisa Polli.

At the disposal of coach Fabio Ulderici, she has been used since the first day of 2021-22 Serie A season, making her debut with the new shirt on 28 August in the 3–0 home defeat against Roma. An important player in the attack, Bragonzi scored for the first time in the following match with Pomigliano, scoring the Tuscan team's second goal from a penalty before their opponents managed to recover to make it 2-2. Her scoring abilities were later confirmed, becoming Empoli's best scorer with seven goals, thanks also to which she contributed to her team reaching 9th place, the last one that guarantees salvation. With the club's decision not to sign up for the next league season, selling Empoli to Parma 1913, Bragonzi returned from her loan with Juventus before her transfer to Sassuolo in the incoming 2022–23 season.

The loan to Sassuolo ended at the end of 2022 with five league appearances, always moving on loan to Pomigliano in 2022 at the beginning of January 2023, with which she collected two goals in ten appearances and won the very important promotion-relegation play-off against Lazio, which allowed the Granata to remain in Serie A.

With the start of the 2023–24 season, she returned to Juventus, only to be transferred on loan to Sampdoria

It was with the "Bianconere" that she scored her first goal with the Sampdoria shirt in the match on 16 December 2023, which ended 1-0 for the "Blucerchiate".

In January 2024, she returned to Juventus. Thanks to the little space found in Max Canzi's plans, she was loaned again on 4 January 2025, this time to Genoa in the Serie B league.

She remained there until the end of the season, before returning to the "Black and White", and terminating her contract.

Following 2 August, she signed with Trabzon, in the top flight Turkish club.

== International career ==
In October 2016, Bragonzi was called up to the Italy girls' U17 team for the match against the same age group of Georgia, valid for the first round of the 2017 UEFA U17 Championship qualification She was then reconfirmed for the elite phase in the spring of the following year, in which she scored a goal in Italy's victory against Poland.

Although the Azzurrine missed out on qualifying for the European Championship, she was reconfirmed in the following year's cycle, also taking part in the 2018 UEFA U17 Championship in Lithuania.

== Honours ==
Juventus

- Serie A (2): 2018–19, 2019–20; runners-up (1): 2023–24
- Coppa Italia (1): 2018–19
- Supercoppa Italiana (2): 2019, 2023
