= Barbara Bonansea =

Italian footballer (born 1991)

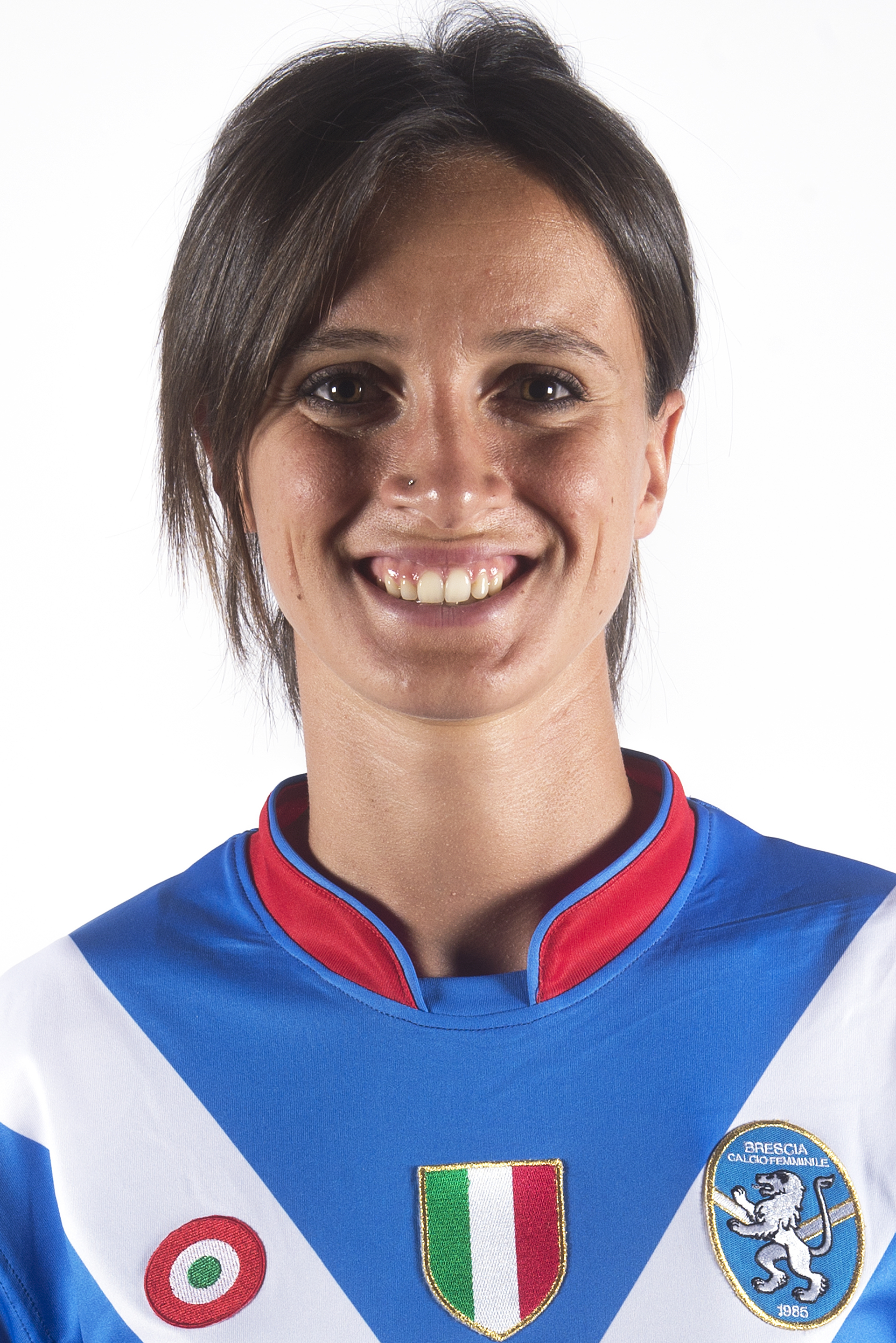
- Bonansea with Brescia in 2016

Personal information
- Date of birth: 13 June 1991 (age 35)
- Place of birth: Pinerolo, Italy
- Height: 1.73 m (5 ft 8 in)
- Positions: Forward; midfielder

Team information
- Current team: San Diego Wave (on loan from Juventus)
- Number: 21

Senior career*
Years	Team	Apps	(Gls)
2006–2012	Torino	108	(27)
2012–2017	Brescia	117	(61)
2017–	Juventus	158	(67)
2026–	→ San Diego Wave (loan)	5	(0)

International career^{‡}
2007–2011	Italy U19	15	(7)
2012–	Italy	121	(34)
- * Club domestic league appearances and goals as of 16:39, 15 November 2026 (UTC) ‡ National team caps and goals as of 13 October 2026

Barbara Bonansea (born 13 June 1991) is an Italian professional footballer who plays as a forward or midfielder for San Diego Wave FC of the National Women's Soccer League (NWSL), on loan from Serie A club Juventus FC, and the Italy national team.

== Club career ==
After more than a 100 games for A.C.F. Torino, Bonansea moved to ACF Brescia in 2012. Bonansea helped ACF Brescia two league titles and two domestic cups. She also won three Italian women's super cups in 2014, 2015, and 2016. In 2016, Bonansea was named Serie A female footballer of the year.

In 2017, Bonansea joined Juventus on a free transfer. She made her debut against Atalanta scoring twice in a 3–0 win. Bonansea won the league title in her first year at the club. In the 2018–19 season, she helped Juventus secure the double, winning the league title and domestic cup.

On 11 September 2026, it was announced that Bonansea had gone on loan to the National Women's Soccer League team San Diego Wave FC through June 2027.

== International career ==
After 15 appearances and 7 goals for Italy at youth level, in September 2012 Bonansea made her Italy senior national team debut in a 0–0 draw against Greece in Athens, in a Euro 2013 qualifier. She was not called up to be part of the Italian squad for the UEFA Women's Euro 2013, however.

During Italy's 2015 World Cup qualifying campaign, she made six appearances, scoring seven goals, including a hat-trick in a 15–0 home victory over Macedonia. In November 2015, she was included by manager Antonio Cabrini in Italy's squad for a double friendly against the Chinese national team, appearing in both the match in Guiyang on 3 December, and in the match in Qujing on 6 December.

In November 2016, she was included in Italy's squad for the 2016 International Women's Football Tournament of Manaus, which was held from 7 to 18 December.

Bonansea was called up to the Italy squad for the UEFA Women's Euro 2017.

Bonansea was called up to the Italy squad for the 2019 FIFA Women's World Cup.

On 26 June 2022, Bonansea was announced in the Italy squad for the UEFA Women's Euro 2022.

On 2 July 2023, Bonansea was called up to the 23-player Italy squad for the 2023 FIFA Women's World Cup.

On 23 February 2024, Bonansea made her 100th appearance for Italy during a 0–0 draw against Republic of Ireland.

On 25 June 2025, Bonansea was called up to the Italy squad for the UEFA Women's Euro 2025.

== Career statistics ==
=== International ===
As of match played 13 October 2026

List of international goals scored by Barbara Bonansea
No.	Date	Venue	Opponent	Score	Result	Competition
1.	13 March 2013	GSZ Stadium, Larnaca, Cyprus	South Korea	1–0	1–0	2013 Cyprus Women's Cup
2.	20 September 2013	A. Le Coq Arena, Tallinn, Estonia	Estonia	5–0	5–1	2015 FIFA Women's World Cup qualification
3.	13 February 2014	Stadio Silvio Piola, Italy	Czech Republic	4–1	6–1	2015 FIFA Women's World Cup qualification
4.	8 May 2014	Petar Miloševski Training Centre, Skopje, North Macedonia	North Macedonia	8–0	11–0	2015 FIFA Women's World Cup qualification
5.	13 September 2014	Stadio Silvio Piola, Vercelli, Italy	Estonia	1–0	4–0	2015 FIFA Women's World Cup qualification
6.	17 September 2014	Stadio Silvio Piola, Vercelli, Italy	North Macedonia	10–0	15–0	2015 FIFA Women's World Cup qualification
7.	17 September 2014	Stadio Silvio Piola, Vercelli, Italy	North Macedonia	13–0	15–0	2015 FIFA Women's World Cup qualification
8.	17 September 2014	Stadio Silvio Piola, Vercelli, Italy	North Macedonia	15–0	15–0	2015 FIFA Women's World Cup qualification
9.	4 March 2015	GSP Stadium, Nicosia, Cyprus	South Korea	1–0	2–1	2015 Cyprus Women's Cup
10.	9 March 2016	GSZ Stadium, Larnaca, Cyprus	Czech Republic	2–1	3–1	2016 Cyprus Women's Cup
11.	7 June 2016	Tengiz Burjanadze Stadium, Gori, Georgia	Georgia	2–0	7–0	UEFA Women's Euro 2017 qualifying
12.	7 June 2016	Tengiz Burjanadze Stadium, Gori, Georgia	Georgia	4–0	7–0	UEFA Women's Euro 2017 qualifying
13.	18 December 2016	Arena da Amazônia, Manaus, Brazil	Brazil	3–4	3–5	2016 International Women's Football Tournament of Manaus
14.	8 March 2017	GSZ Stadium, Larnaca, Cyprus	Czech Republic	4–1	6–2	2017 Cyprus Women's Cup
15.	15 September 2017	Stadio Alberto Picco, La Spezia, Italy	Moldova	2–0	5–0	2019 FIFA Women's World Cup qualification
16.	24 October 2017	Stadio Teofilo Patini, Castel di Sangro, Italy	Romania	3–0	3–0	2019 FIFA Women's World Cup qualification
17.	28 February 2018	Antonis Papadopoulos Stadium, Larnaca, Cyprus	Switzerland	1–0	3–0	2018 Cyprus Women's Cup
18.	8 June 2018	Stadio Artemio Franchi, Florence, Italy	Portugal	3–0	3–0	2019 FIFA Women's World Cup qualification
19.	27 February 2019	Antonis Papadopoulos Stadium, Larnaca, Cyprus	Mexico	2–0	5–0	2019 Cyprus Women's Cup
20.	4 March 2019	AEK Arena, Larnaca, Cyprus	Thailand	1–0	4–1	2019 Cyprus Women's Cup
21.	9 June 2019	Stade du Hainaut, Valenciennes, France	Australia	1–0	2–1	2019 FIFA Women's World Cup
22.	9 June 2019	Stade du Hainaut, Valenciennes, France	Australia	2–1	2–1	2019 FIFA Women's World Cup
23.	7 March 2020	Vista Municipal Stadium, Parchal, Portugal	New Zealand	2–0	3–0	2020 Algarve Cup
24.	24 February 2021	Stadio Artemio Franchi, Florence, Italy	Israel	2–0	12–0	UEFA Women's Euro 2022 qualifying
25.	24 February 2021	Stadio Artemio Franchi, Florence, Italy	Israel	11–0	12–0	UEFA Women's Euro 2022 qualifying
26.	26 November 2021	Stadio Renzo Barbera, Palermo, Italy	Switzerland	1–0	1–2	2023 FIFA Women's World Cup qualification
27.	30 November 2021	Stadionul Anghel Iordănescu, Voluntari, Romania	Romania	1–0	5–0	2023 FIFA Women's World Cup qualification
28.	16 February 2022	Estádio Municipal de Lagos, Lagos, Portugal	Denmark	1–0	1–0	2022 Algarve Cup
29.	22 July 2025	Stade de Genève, Geneva, Switzerland	England	1–0	1–2 (a.e.t.)	UEFA Euro 2025
30.	5 June 2026	Arena Garibaldi, Pisa, Italy	Serbia	3–0	3–0	2027 FIFA Women's World Cup qualification
31.						
32.						
33.						
34.	13 October 2026	Stadio Artemio Franchi, Florence, Italy	Belarus	1–0	1–1	2027 FIFA World Cup qualification

== Style of play ==
FIFA described Bonansea as “pacey and snake-hipped” and “able to balletically slalom past opponents on grass like Alberto Tomba did poles,” comparing her to Paulo Futre and Ryan Giggs in their primes. Bonansea is renowned for scoring wonder goals, including the knuckleball free-kicks pioneered by Juninho Pernambucano.

== Personal life ==
Bonansea is an economics graduate and aspires to play football professionally outside of Italy. Bonansea enjoys reading Dan Brown books, watching romance and thriller films, and learning to play the guitar.

== Honours ==
Brescia

- Serie A: 2013–14, 2015–16
- Coppa Italia: 2014–15, 2015–16
- Supercoppa Italiana: 2014, 2015, 2016

Juventus

- Serie A: 2017–18, 2018–19, 2019–20, 2020–21, 2021–22, 2024–25
- Coppa Italia: 2018–19, 2021–22, 2022–23, 2024–25
- Supercoppa Italiana: 2019, 2020, 2021, 2023, 2025
- Serie A Women's Cup: 2025, 2026

Individual

- AIC Serie A Female Footballer of the Year: 2015–2016
- AIC Serie A Women's Team of the Year: 2018–19
- FIFA FIFPro Women's World11: 2020, 2021
- Italian Football Hall of Fame: 2021
- Serie A Goal of the Year: 2021
- Algarve Cup MVP: 2022
