= Cecilia Salvai =

Italian footballer (born 1993)

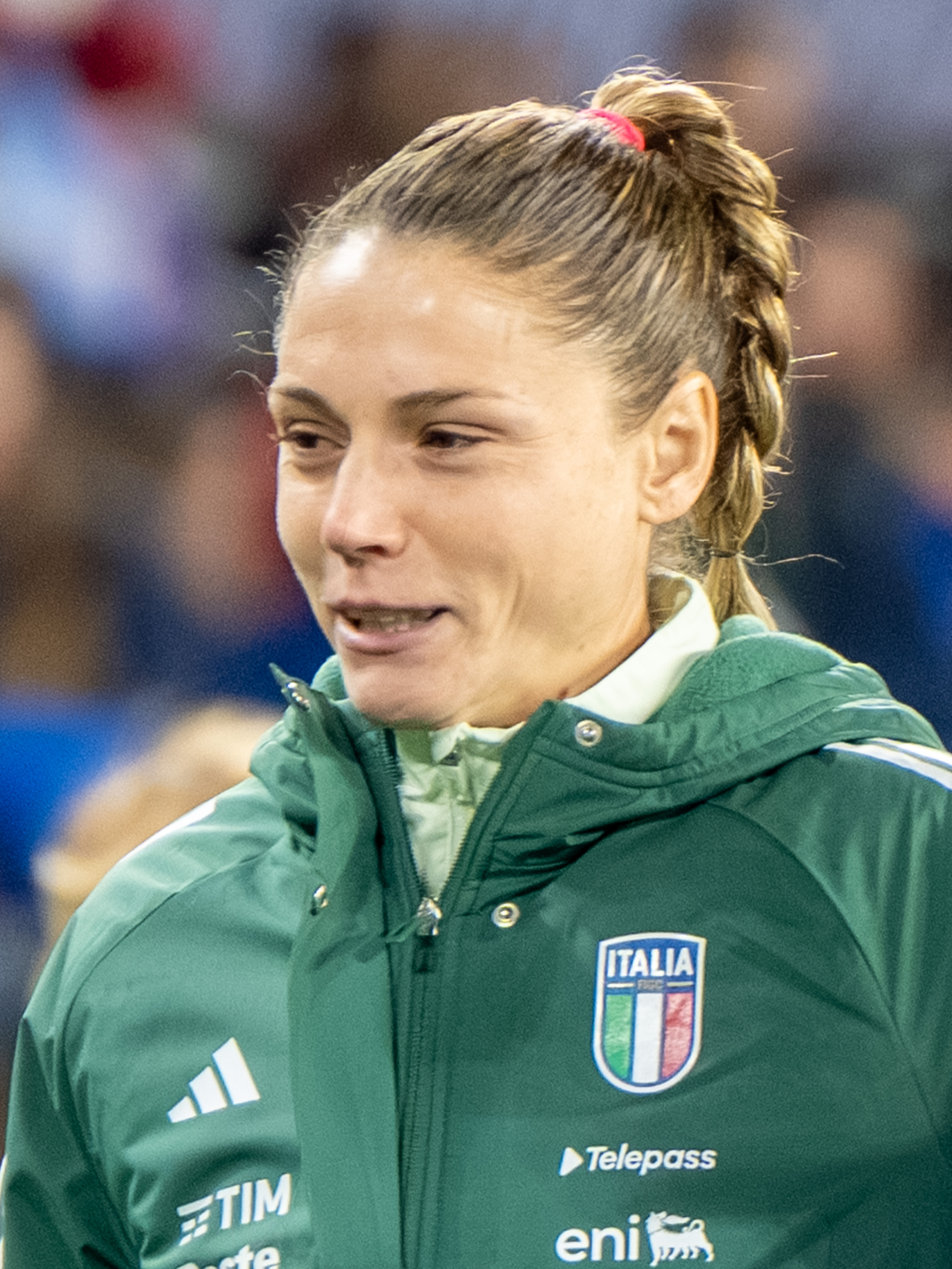
- Salvai with Italy in 2025

Personal information
- Date of birth: 2 December 1993 (age 32)
- Place of birth: Pinerolo, Italy
- Height: 1.75 m (5 ft 9 in)
- Position: Centre back

Team information
- Current team: Juventus
- Number: 23

Senior career*
Years	Team	Apps	(Gls)
2008–2009	Canavese	4	(1)
2009–2012	Torino	60	(4)
2012–2013	Lugano		
2013–2016	Verona	54	(5)
2016–2017	Brescia	19	(0)
2017–	Juventus	121	(7)

International career^{‡}
2010–2012	Italy U19	9	(1)
2012	Italy U20	3	(0)
2013–	Italy	73	(3)
- * Club domestic league appearances and goals as of 17:26, 11 November 2026 (UTC) ‡ National team caps and goals as of 11 October 2026

Cecilia Salvai (born 2 December 1993) is an Italian professional footballer who plays as a centre back for Serie A club Juventus FC and the Italy women's national team. She has represented Italy U19 at the 2011 UEFA Women's Under-19 Championship.

== Club career ==
Salvai started her professional career with Canavese in 2008, and after a single season she moved to Torino, where she developed into a regular for the Turinese club. The team's website described her as "without doubt, the player with most appeal in Torino's roster." She plays primarily as a left-back, but she can move to become a centre-back when needed.

Before the start of the 2012–13 season, she moved to Swiss club Rapid Lugano, and left at the end of the season to return to Italy, as she signed with Veronese club Bardolino Verona. On 11 July 2016, ahead of the 2016–17 season, she joined ACF Brescia Femminile. She joined Juventus starting in the 2017–18 season.

In August 2021, the Juventus Twitter account posted an image of Salvai using her fingers to pull back her eyes while wearing a training cone on her head, prompting accusations of racism against Asian people. The tweet was soon deleted, and the club apologized.

== International career ==
=== Under-19 ===
During the 2011 Championship Salvai was named on the starting XI of the opening group stage match against Russia. She did no play in the second group stage match against Switzerland, but she scored the equalizer against Belgium in an eventual 3–1 win for the azzurre. Italy reached the semi-finals unbeaten, but eventually lost 2–3 to Norway.

She was also called for the first qualifying round for the 2012 Championship, and she started all three matches as Italy advanced to the second qualifying round, where, again, she was a regular and started all three matches. Italy, however, finished second in its group and last amongst the runners-up, and therefore did not advance to the final tournament.

=== Under-20 ===
Salvai was called by Italy's U-20 coach Corrado Corradini to take part in the 2012 World Cup, where she was a starter in all three group stage matches. As Italy finished last in Group B, they did not play any other match.

=== Senior ===
Salvai made her début for the senior team on 19 September 2012, as Italy faced Greece in the final qualification match before UEFA Women's Euro 2013. She started the first two group stage matches against Finland and Denmark but did not play against Sweden, as Italy advanced to the quarter-finals.

Salvai was called up to the Italy squad for the UEFA Women's Euro 2017.

On 2 July 2023, Salvai was called up to the 23-player Italy squad for the 2023 FIFA Women's World Cup.

On 25 June 2025, Salvai was called up to the Italy squad for the UEFA Women's Euro 2025.

== Personal life ==
Salvai contracted and was treated for Hodgkin lymphoma at age four.

In 2019, she married amateur footballer and member of Fortitudo Mozzecane Women's staff Matteo Borgese near Asti.

== Career statistics ==
=== International ===
Scores and results list Italy's goal tally first, score column indicates score after each Salvai goal.

List of international goals scored by Cecilia Salvai
No.	Date	Venue	Opponent	Score	Result	Competition
1	8 June 2018	Stadio Artemio Franchi, Florence, Italy	Portugal	2–0	3–0	2019 FIFA Women's World Cup qualification
2	24 February 2021	Israel	Stadio Artemio Franchi, Florence, Italy	6–0	12–0	UEFA Women's Euro 2022 qualifying
3	5 December 2023	Stadio Ennio Tardini, Parma, Italy	Switzerland	2–0	3–0	2023–24 UEFA Women's Nations League

== Honours ==
Juventus

- Serie A: 2017–18, 2018–19, 2019–20, 2020–21, 2021–22
- Coppa Italia: 2018–19, 2021–22
- Serie A Women's Cup: 2025
- Supercoppa Italiana: 2019, 2020–21, 2021–22

Individual

- AIC Best Women's XI: 2019
