= Aurora Galli =

Italian footballer (born 1996)

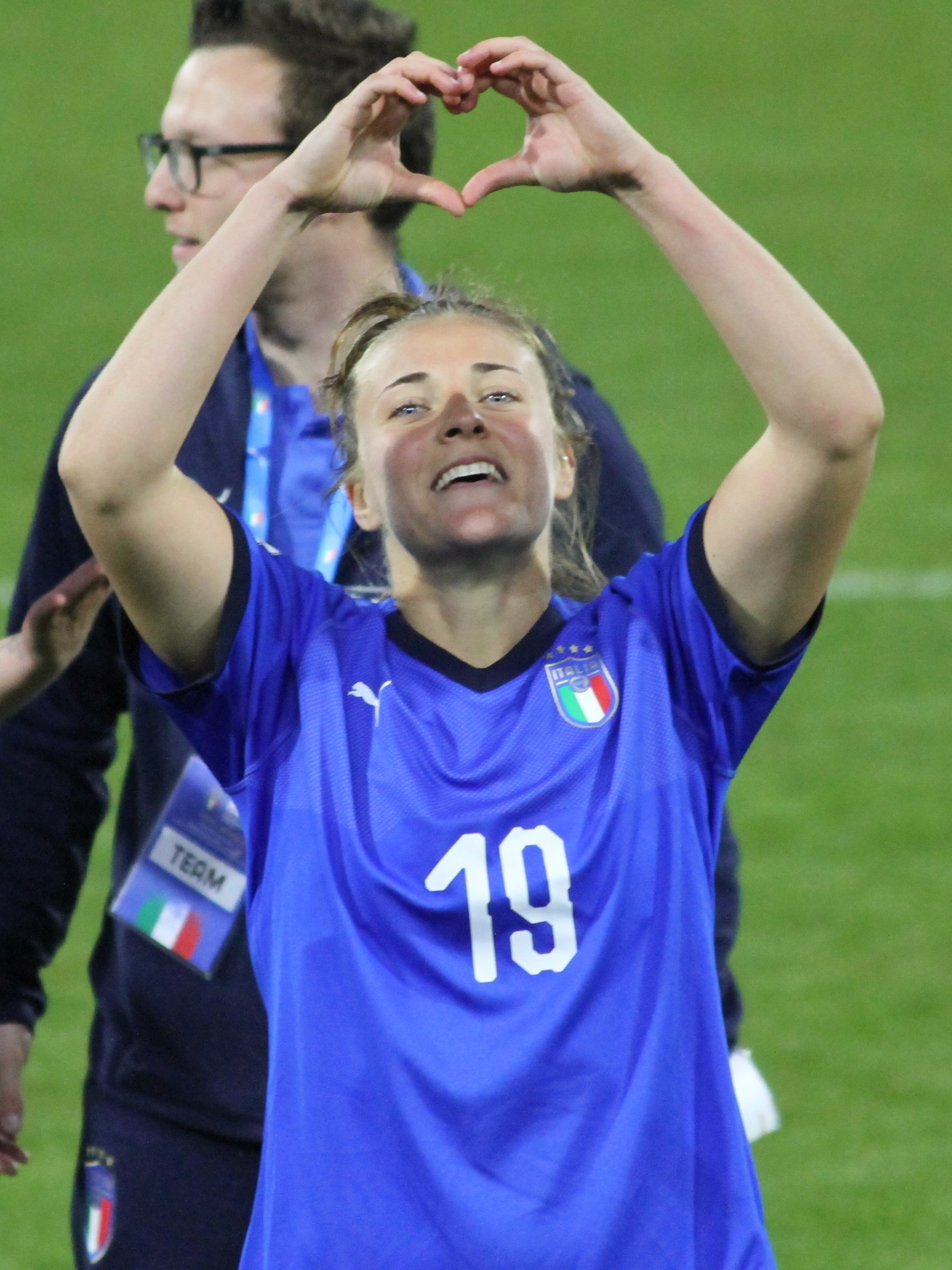
- Galli with the Italy national team in 2018

Personal information
- Date of birth: 13 December 1996 (age 29)
- Place of birth: Tromello, Italy
- Height: 1.68 m (5 ft 6 in)
- Position: Midfielder

Team information
- Current team: Everton
- Number: 22

Senior career*
Years	Team	Apps	(Gls)
2011–2015	Inter Milano	30	(3)
2013–2015	→ Torres Calcio (loan)	45	(1)
2015–2016	Mozzanica	20	(0)
2016–2017	Verona	22	(2)
2017–2021	Juventus	67	(10)
2021–	Everton	69	(5)

International career^{‡}
2011–2013	Italy U17	9	(1)
2014–2015	Italy U19	6	(1)
2014–	Italy	74	(6)
- * Club domestic league appearances and goals as of 15:01, 19 May 2026 (UTC) ‡ National team caps and goals as of 16:07, 4 April 2026 (UTC)

Aurora Galli (Italian: [auˈrɔːra ˈɡalli]; born 13 December 1996) is an Italian professional footballer who plays as a midfielder for Women's Super League club Everton and the Italy national team.

== Career ==
On 28 July 2021, Galli signed for Everton, in doing so she became the first Italian player to sign for a Women's Super League club, as well as the first ever Italian female footballer to play professional football following the transition to professionalism of the Women's Super League in 2018.

On 2 March 2022, Galli scored her first Women's Super League goal for Everton against Aston Villa. On 23 July 2024, she extended her deal with the club. On the opening day of the 2024–25 Women's Super League season against Brighton & Hove Albion, Galli suffered an ACL injury.

On 9 July 2026, the club announced that Galli had signed a new one–year contract with the club.

== International career ==
Galli was called up to the 30-player squad for UEFA Women's Euro 2017. She was part of the final squad called up.

Galli was selected in the provisional 26-player squad for the 2019 FIFA Women's World Cup. She was selected in the final 23-player squad.

Galli was included in the Italian squad for UEFA Women's Euro 2022.

== Personal life ==
Galli is in a relationship with Swedish footballer Nathalie Björn. The couple became engaged in July 2026.

== Career statistics ==
=== Club ===
As of match played 16 May 2026

Appearances and goals by club, season and competition
Club	Season	League			National cup (Note: Includes Coppa Italia, Women's FA Cup)		League cup (Note: Includes Women's League Cup)		Continental		Other		Total	
Club	Season	Division	Apps	Goals	Apps	Goals	Apps	Goals	Apps	Goals	Apps	Goals	Apps	Goals
Inter Milano	2011–12	Serie A2	11	2	?	?	—		—		—		11	2
Inter Milano	2012–13	Serie A2	19	1	?	?	—		—		—		19	1
Inter Milano	Total		30	3	0	0	0	0	0	0	0	0	30	3
Torres Calcio (loan)	2013–14	Serie A	21	0	?	?	—		4 (Note: Appearance(s) in UEFA Women's Champions League)	0	1 (Note: Appearance(s) in Supercoppa Italiana)	0	26	0
Torres Calcio (loan)	2014–15	Serie A	24	1	4	2	—		4	0	—		32	3
Torres Calcio (loan)	Total		45	1	4	2	0	0	8	0	1	0	58	3
Mozzanica	2015–16	Serie A	20	0	7	1	—		—		—		27	1
Verona	2016–17	Serie A	22	2	5	0	—		2	0	1	0	30	2
Juventus	2017–18	Serie A	23	5	4	2	—		—		—		27	7
Juventus	2018–19	Serie A	18	3	4	0	—		2	0	1	0	25	3
Juventus	2019–20	Serie A	13	1	2	0	—		2	0	1	0	18	1
Juventus	2020–21	Serie A	13	1	1	0	—		2	0	2	0	18	1
Juventus	Total		67	10	11	2	0	0	6	0	4	0	88	12
Everton	2021–22	Women's Super League	18	1	3	0	4	0	—		—		25	1
Everton	2022–23	Women's Super League	20	0	1	0	4	0	—		—		25	0
Everton	2023–24	Women's Super League	19	3	3	0	4	0	—		—		26	3
Everton	2024–25	Women's Super League	2	0	0	0	0	0	—		—		2	0
Everton	2025–26	Women's Super League	10	1	2	0	0	0	—		—		12	1
Everton	Total		69	5	9	0	12	0	0	0	0	0	90	5
Career total			253	21	36	5	12	0	16	0	6	0	317	26

=== International ===
As of match played 31 May 2024

Appearances and goals by national team and year
National team	Year	Apps	Goals
Italy	2015	1	0
Italy	2016	7	0
Italy	2017	8	0
Italy	2018	9	0
Italy	2019	19	5
Italy	2020	5	1
Italy	2021	2	0
Italy	2022	10	0
Italy	2023	7	0
Italy	2024	5	0
Total		74	6

Scores and results list Italy's goal tally first, score column indicates score after each Galli goal.

List of international goals scored by Aurora Galli
No.	Date	Venue	Opponent	Score	Result	Competition	Ref.
1	4 March 2019	AEK Arena, Larnaca, Cyprus	Thailand	3–0	4–1	2019 Cyprus Women's Cup	
2	29 May 2019	Stadio Paolo Mazza, Ferrara, Italy	Switzerland	1–0	3–1	Friendly	
3	14 June 2019	Stade Auguste-Delaune, Reims, France	Jamaica	4–0	5–0	2019 FIFA Women's World Cup	
4	14 June 2019	Stade Auguste-Delaune, Reims, France	Jamaica	5–0	5–0	2019 FIFA Women's World Cup	
5	25 June 2019	Stade de la Mosson, Montpellier, France	China	2–0	2–0	2019 FIFA Women's World Cup	
6	22 September 2020	Bosnia and Herzegovina FA Training Centre, Zenica, Bosnia & Herzegovina	Bosnia and Herzegovina	1–0	5–0	UEFA Women's Euro 2022 qualifying	

== Honours ==
Torres

- Italian Women's Super Cup: 2013

Juventus

- Serie A: 2017–18, 2018–19, 2019–20, 2020–21
- Coppa Italia: 2018–19
- Supercoppa Italiana: 2019, 2020–21

Individual

- Serie A Women's Team of the Year: 2019, 2020
- Everton Spirit of the Blues Award: 2022
