= Sabrina Tasselli =

Italian footballer (born 1990)

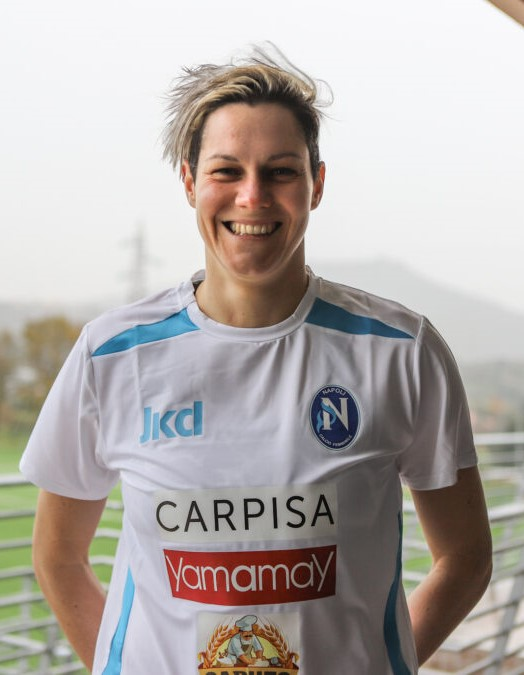
- Tasselli with Napoli in 2021

Personal information
- Date of birth: 3 April 1990 (age 36)
- Place of birth: Carpi, Italy
- Height: 1.75 m (5 ft 9 in)
- Position: Goalkeeper

Team information
- Current team: Ternana

Senior career*
Years	Team	Apps	(Gls)
2009–2011	Reggiana	5+	(0)
2011–2012	Tavagnacco	5	(0)
2012–2013	Bardolino Verona	8	(0)
2013–2015	Riviera di Romagna	45	(0)
2015–2016	Atletico Oristano		(0)
2016	Stjarnan	1	(0)
2016–2019	Sassuolo (Note: A.S.D. Reggiana Calcio Femminile renamed to U.S. Sassuolo Calcio Femminile in 2017.)	19	(0)
2019–2021	Juventus	0	(0)
2021	Napoli	8	(0)
2021–2022	Fiorentina	7	(0)
2022–2023	Napoli	13	(0)
2023–2024	Ternana	?	(?)
2024–2025	Brescia	0	(0)

International career
2015–2017	Italy	4	(0)
- * Club domestic league appearances and goals as of 17 September 2023

Sabrina Tasselli (born 3 April 1990) is an Italian footballer who most recently played as a goalkeeper for Brescia in Serie B. She has made multiple appearances for the Italy national team.

== Club career ==
Tasselli plays as a goalkeeper. From 2009 to 2011, Tasselli played for Reggiana. She was part of the Reggiana squad that won the 2010 Coppa Italia, though she did not play in the final. She then played for Tavagnacco, Bardolino Verona and Riviera di Romagna.

In 2015, Tasselli moved from Riviera di Romagna to Atletico Oristano. In 2016, she played for Icelandic club Stjarnan, who won the 2016 Úrvalsdeild kvenna. In September 2016, she returned to Italy to play for Reggiana. In the 2016–17 season, Reggiana won Serie B, and were promoted to Serie A. From 2017 to 2019, Tasselli played for Sassuolo, and in 2019, she signed for Juventus. In July 2020, she signed a one-year contract extension, and whilst she was at Juventus, they won the 2019–20 Serie A and the 2020 Supercoppa Italiana. In January 2021, Tasselli signed for Napoli, on a contract until the end of the 2020–21 season. She made her Napoli debut in March 2021, as regular goalkeeper Catalina Pérez was injured. In July 2021, Tasselli signed for Fiorentina. In July 2022, Tasselli re-signed for Napoli. One year after signed for Ternana, playing in Serie B. In 2024, Tasselli signed for Serie B team Brescia.

== International career ==
Tasselli received her maiden call to the Italy women's national football team for the 2015 Cyprus Women's Cup. Later that year, she made her debut for Italy, in a friendly match against China. She played in Italy's 2016 Cyprus Women's Cup match against the Republic of Ireland, and was in the squad for the 2017 Cyprus Women's Cup.

== Honours ==
Juventus

- Serie A: 2020–21
