= 2022 Supercoppa Italiana (women) =

26rd edition of the Supercoppa Italiana

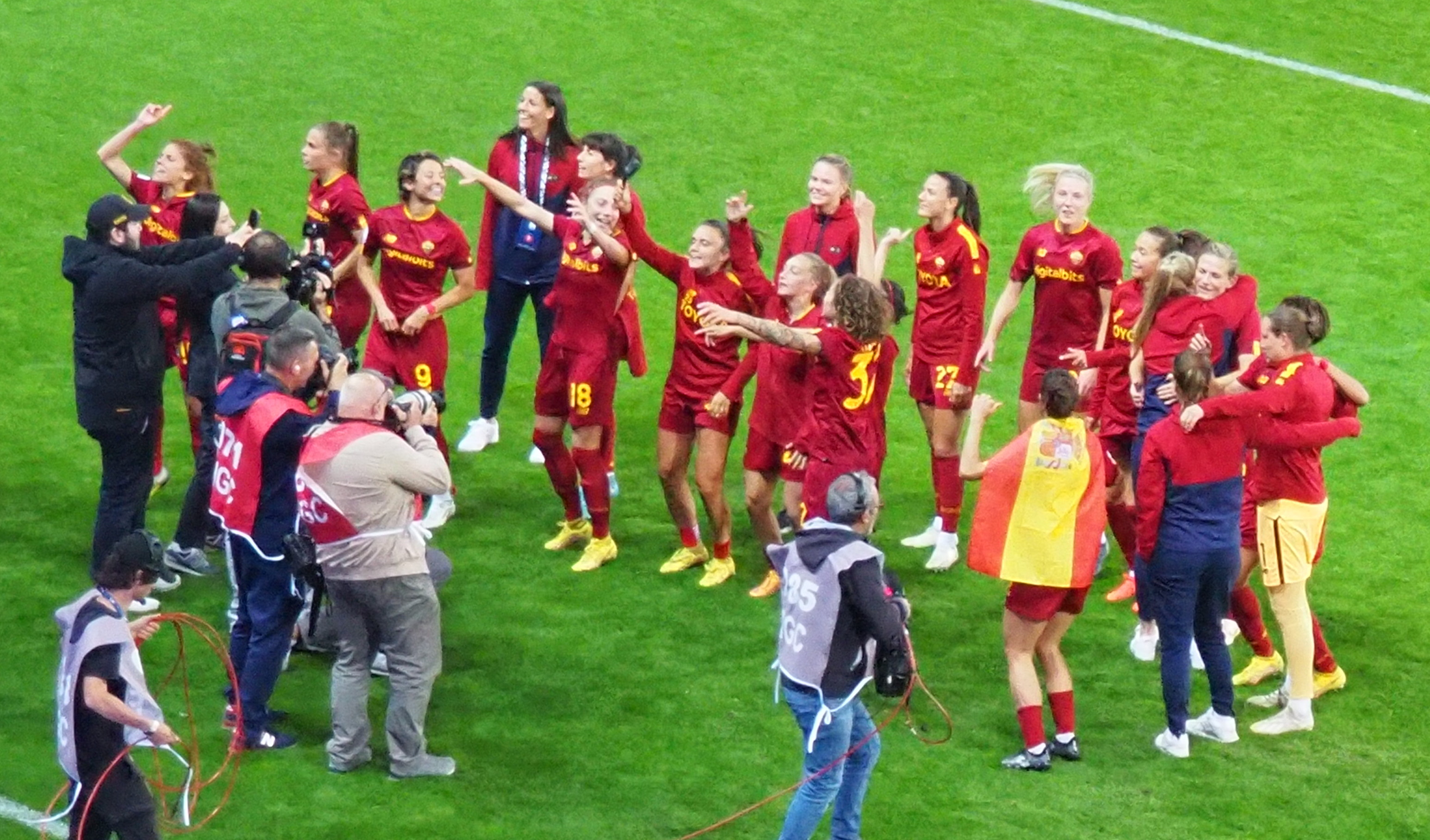
- Roma's team, winner of the edition
- Event: Supercoppa Italiana (women)
Juventus	Roma
Serie A	Coppa Italia
1	1
- After extra time Roma won 4–3 on penalties
- Date: 5 November 2022
- Venue: Stadio Ennio Tardini, Parma
- Player of the Match: Camelia Ceasar
- Referee: Maria Marotta
- Attendance: 3500

The 2022 Supercoppa Italiana (branded as the 2022 Supercoppa Italiana Ferrovie dello Stato Italiane for sponsorship reasons) was the 26rd edition of the Supercoppa Italiana. It was contested by Juventus, the 2021–22 Serie A and 2021–22 Coppa Italia champions and Roma, the runners-up of the two competitions.

The match was played in Parma at Stadio Ennio Tardini on 5 November 2022 and Roma won their first title. This edition was then first, since 2019's edition played between only two teams.

== Match ==
5 November 2022
14:30 UTC+01:00

Juventus	1–1 (a.e.t.)	Roma
Boattin 60'	Report	Giacinti 19'
Penalties
Boattin (penalty scored); Sembrant (penalty scored); Girelli (penalty missed); Cernoia (penalty scored); Cantore (penalty missed)	3–4	(penalty scored) Giugliano; (penalty scored) Linari; (penalty missed) Glionna; (penalty scored) Lázaro; (penalty scored) Haavi

Stadio Ennio Tardini, Parma
Referee: Maria Marotta

Man of the Match: (Romania) Camelia Ceasar
Match rules

- 90 minutes.
- 30 minutes of extra time if necessary.
- Penalty shoot-out if scores still level.
- Maximum of twelve named substitutes.
- Maximum of five substitutions, with a sixth allowed in extra time.

== Broadcasting ==
Italian broadcasters La7 and La7d has secured linear and digital rights to domestic women's club football competitions for the 2021–22 and 2022–23 seasons as part of an extended rights deal with the Italian Football Federation, which includes Supercoppa Italiana.
