= Girelli =

Girelli is an Italian surname. Notable people with the surname include:

- Coyle Girelli, English musician
- Cristiana Girelli (born 1990), Italian footballer
- Leopoldo Girelli (born 1953), Italian archbishop, Vatican diplomat
- Sebastiano Girelli (born 1984), Italian footballer
