= 2018 Supercoppa Italiana (women) =

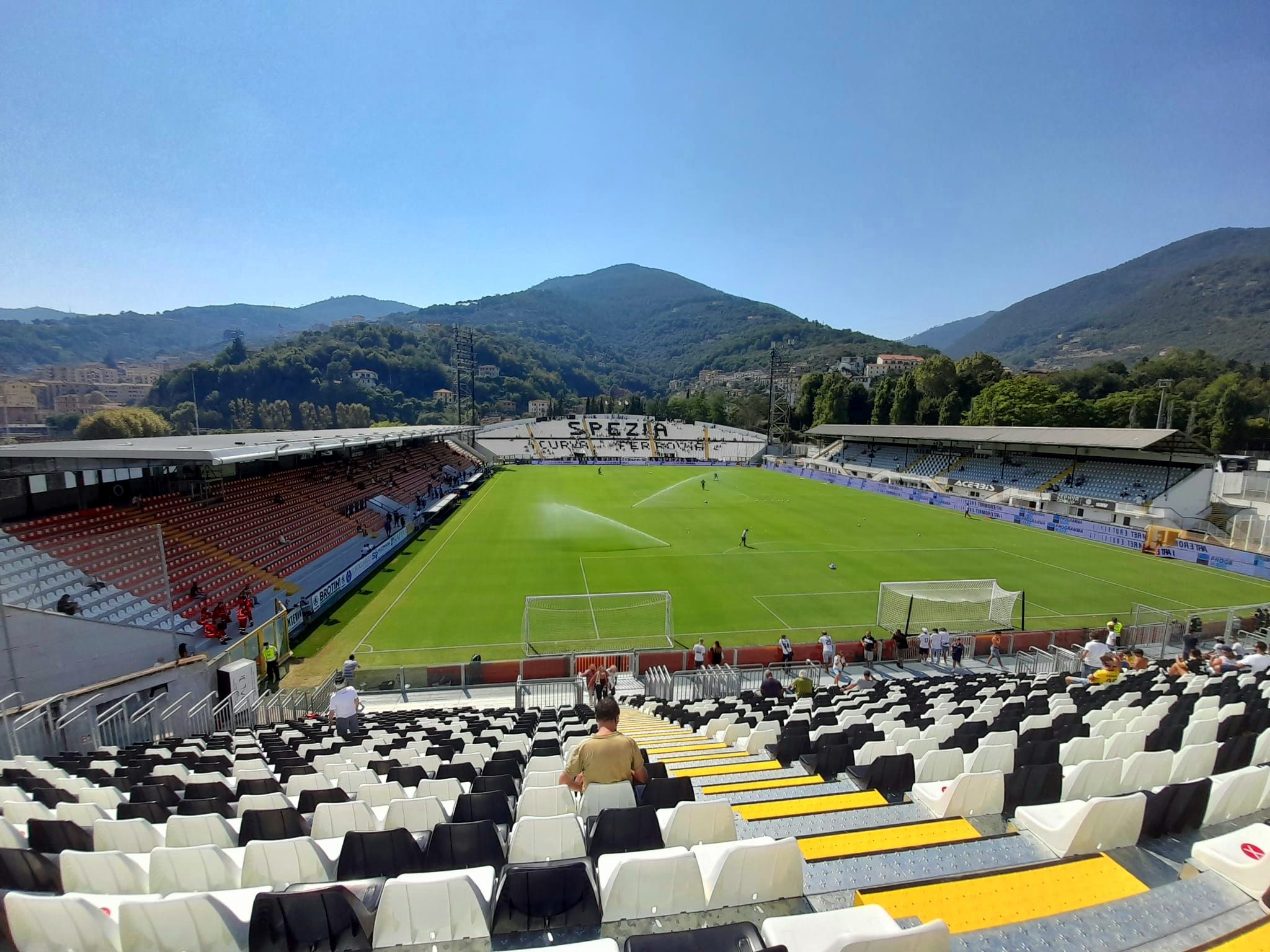
- Stadio Alberto Picco, hosted the final on 13 October 2018
- Event: Supercoppa Italiana (women)
Juventus	Fiorentina
Serie A	Coppa Italia
0	1
- Date: 13 October 2018
- Venue: Stadio Alberto Picco, La Spezia
- Referee: Delirio

The 2018 Supercoppa Italiana was the 22rd edition of the Supercoppa Italiana. It was contested by Juventus, the 2017–18 Serie A champions and Fiorentina, the 2017–18 Coppa Italia champions.

The match was played in La Spezia at Stadio Alberto Picco on 13 October 2018 and Fiorentina won his first title.

The match, initially scheduled for 25 August 2018 in La Spezia, was subsequently postponed by the LND to a date to be decided upon request by the companies involved. Once the CONI College of Guarantee reassigned the organization of Serie A and Serie B to the FIGC, the date of the Italian Super Cup was also identified on 13 October 2018.

== Match ==
13 October 2018
20:45 CEST

Juventus	0–1	Fiorentina
	Report	Mauro 68'

Stadio Alberto Picco, La Spezia
Referee: Delirio
