= Cristiana Girelli =

Italian footballer (born 1990)

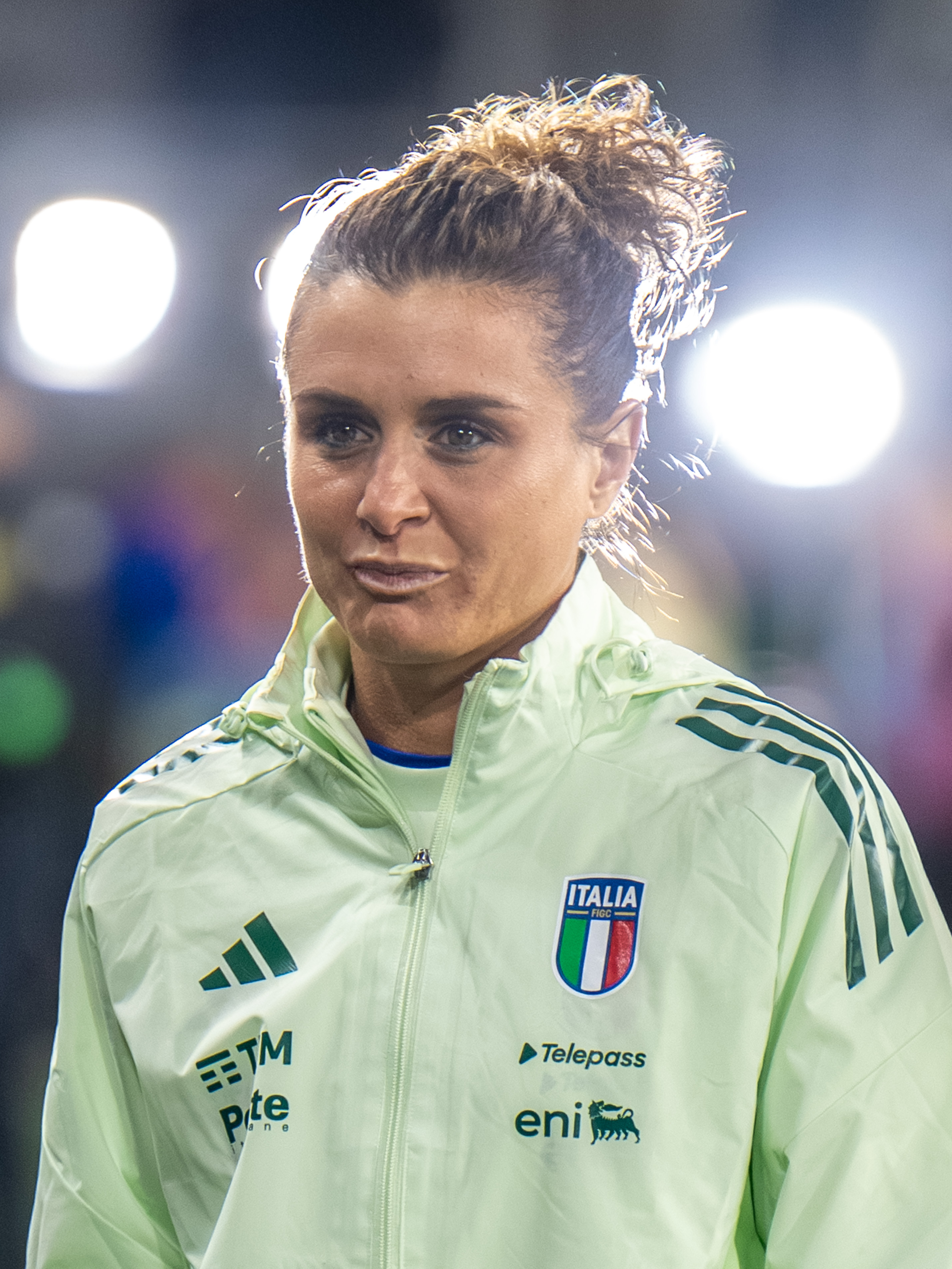
- Girelli with Italy in 2025

Personal information
- Date of birth: 23 April 1990 (age 36)
- Place of birth: Gavardo, Italy
- Height: 1.76 m (5 ft 9 in)
- Position: Striker

Team information
- Current team: Bay FC (on loan from Juventus)
- Number: 10

Senior career*
Years	Team	Apps	(Gls)
2005–2013	Bardolino	66	(60)
2013–2018	Brescia	115	(98)
2018–	Juventus	155	(107)
2026–	→ Bay FC (loan)	25	(1)

International career^{‡}
2013–	Italy	132	(62)
- * Club domestic league appearances and goals as of 05:09, 2 November 2026 (UTC) ‡ National team caps and goals as of 11 October 2026

Cristiana Girelli (born 23 April 1990) is an Italian professional footballer who plays as a striker for Bay FC of the National Women's Soccer League (NWSL), on loan from Serie A club Juventus, and the Italy national team.

== Club career ==
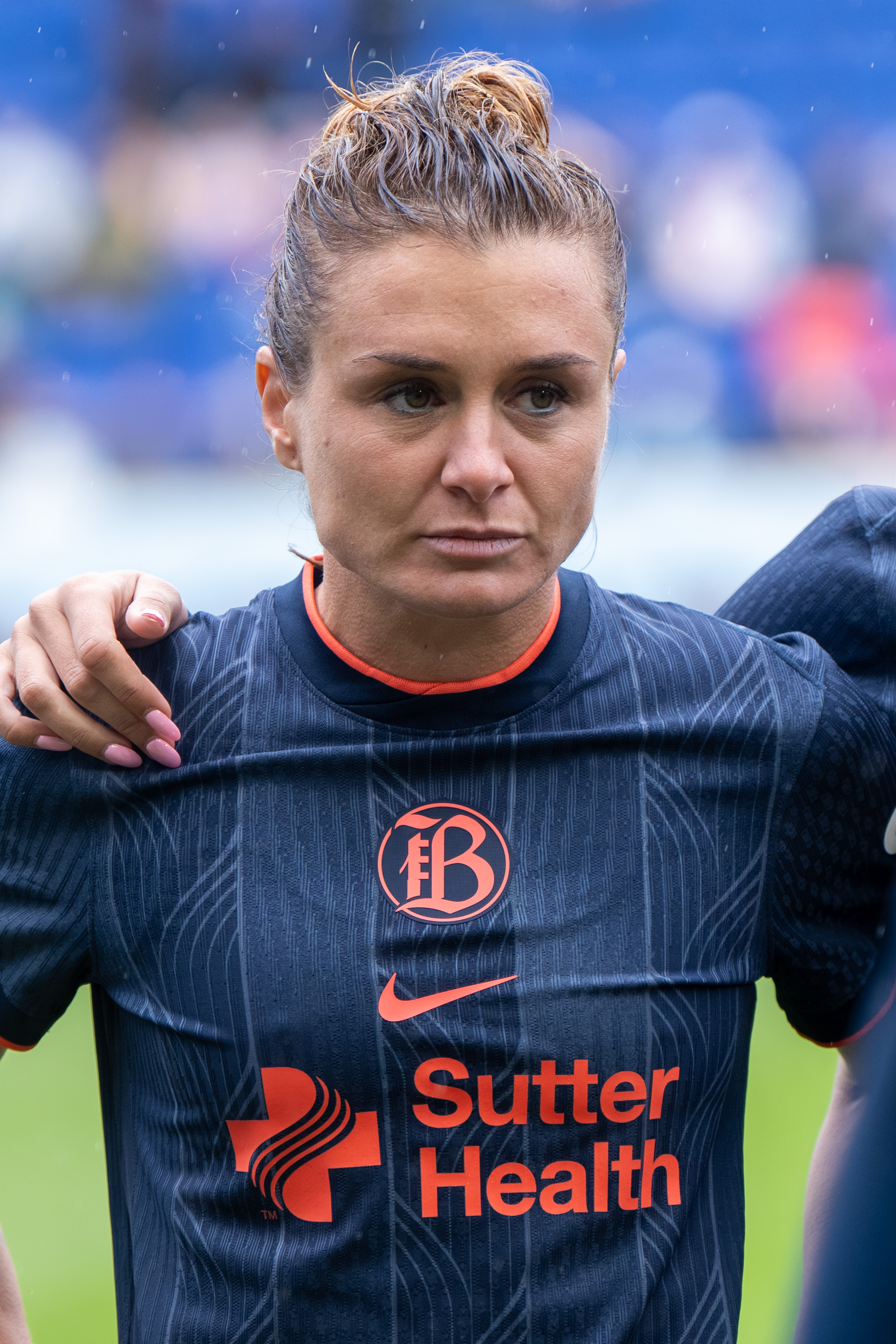
Girelli with Bay FC in 2026

Girelli joined Juventus in 2018, after five seasons with Brescia. She is the top scorer of the Serie A 2019–20 season, 2020–21 season and the 2024–25 season.

On 27 February 2026, NWSL club Bay FC announced that they had acquired Girelli on a loan deal through August 2026. She scored her first goal for the club on 23 August 2026, making the winning goal in the 89th minute of the team's 1–0 victory over the Houston Dash. Shortly thereafter, Girelli extended her loan with Bay FC to June 2027.

== International career ==
She made her debut for the senior Italian national team in a March 2013 friendly against England, and soon afterwards she was selected for the 2013 UEFA Euro's final tournament. She led the Italian scoring in the qualifiers for the 2017 UEFA Euro, where she scored a late winner against Olympic runner-up Sweden. She has also been an Under-19 international.

Girelli was called up to the Italy squad for the UEFA Women's Euro 2017.

Girelli was called up to the Italy squad for the 2019 FIFA Women's World Cup.

On 26 June 2022, Girelli was announced in the Italy squad for the UEFA Women's Euro 2022.

On 2 July 2023, Girelli was called up to the 23-player Italy squad for the 2023 FIFA Women's World Cup. In Italy's first game of the 2023 FIFA Women's World Cup, Girelli scored the only goal against Argentina.

On 25 June 2025, Girelli was called up to the Italy squad for the UEFA Women's Euro 2025.

== International goals ==
No.	Date	Venue	Opponent	Score	Result	Competition
1.	26 September 2013	Stadio Rino Mercante, Bassano del Grappa, Italy	Romania	1–0	1–0	2015 FIFA Women's World Cup qualification
2.	7 March 2014	GSZ Stadium, Larnaca, Cyprus	Canada	1–3	1–3	2014 Cyprus Women's Cup
3.	8 May 2014	Petar Miloševski Training Centre, Skopje, Macedonia	Macedonia	2–0	11–0	2015 FIFA Women's World Cup qualification
4.	8 May 2014	Petar Miloševski Training Centre, Skopje, Macedonia	Macedonia	3–0	11–0	2015 FIFA Women's World Cup qualification
5.	8 May 2014	Petar Miloševski Training Centre, Skopje, Macedonia	Macedonia	6–0	11–0	2015 FIFA Women's World Cup qualification
6.	17 May 2014	Stadio Artemio Franchi, Florence, Italy	Bahrain	4–0	6–0	Friendly
7.	6 March 2015	GSZ Stadium, Larnaca, Cyprus	Scotland	1–0	3–2	2015 Cyprus Women's Cup
8.	6 March 2015	GSZ Stadium, Larnaca, Cyprus	Scotland	3–0	3–2	2015 Cyprus Women's Cup
9.	18 September 2015	Stadio Alberto Picco, La Spezia, Italy	Georgia	5–1	6–1	UEFA Women's Euro 2017 qualifying
10.	18 September 2015	Stadio Alberto Picco, La Spezia, Italy	Georgia	6–1	6–1	UEFA Women's Euro 2017 qualifying
11.	7 June 2016	Tengiz Burjanadze Stadium, Gori, Georgia	Georgia	6–0	7–0	UEFA Women's Euro 2017 qualifying
12.	7 June 2016	Tengiz Burjanadze Stadium, Gori, Georgia	Georgia	7–0	7–0	UEFA Women's Euro 2017 qualifying
13.	16 September 2016	Mourneview Park, Lurgan, Northern Ireland	Northern Ireland	1–0	3–0	UEFA Women's Euro 2017 qualifying
14.	16 September 2016	Mourneview Park, Lurgan, Northern Ireland	Northern Ireland	3–0	3–0	UEFA Women's Euro 2017 qualifying
15.	8 March 2017	GSZ Stadium, Larnaca, Cyprus	Czech Republic	1–1	6–2	2017 Cyprus Women's Cup
16.	8 March 2017	GSZ Stadium, Larnaca, Cyprus	Czech Republic	2–1	6–2	2017 Cyprus Women's Cup
17.	25 July 2017	De Vijverberg, Doetinchem, Netherlands	Sweden	3–2	3–2	UEFA Women's Euro 2017
18.	15 September 2017	Stadio Alberto Picco, La Spezia, Italy	Moldova	3–0	5–0	2019 FIFA Women's World Cup qualification
19.	15 September 2017	Stadio Alberto Picco, La Spezia, Italy	Moldova	5–0	5–0	2019 FIFA Women's World Cup qualification
20.	24 October 2017	Stadio Teofilo Patini, Castel di Sangro, Italy	Romania	1–0	3–0	2019 FIFA Women's World Cup qualification
21.	24 October 2017	Stadio Teofilo Patini, Castel di Sangro, Italy	Romania	2–0	3–0	2019 FIFA Women's World Cup qualification
22.	20 January 2018	Stade Vélodrome, Marseille, France	France	1–0	1–1	Friendly
23.	28 January 2018	Antonis Papadopoulos Stadium, Larnaca, Cyprus	Switzerland	3–0	3–0	2018 Cyprus Women's Cup
24.	2 March 2018	GSZ Stadium, Larnaca, Cyprus	Wales	1–0	3–0	2018 Cyprus Women's Cup
25.	2 March 2018	GSZ Stadium, Larnaca, Cyprus	Wales	2–0	3–0	2018 Cyprus Women's Cup
26.	10 April 2018	Stadio Paolo Mazza, Ferrara, Italy	Belgium	2–1	2–1	2019 FIFA Women's World Cup qualification
27.	8 June 2018	Stadio Artemio Franchi, Florence, Italy	Portugal	1–0	3–0	2019 FIFA Women's World Cup qualification
28.	4 September 2018	Den Dreef, Leuven, Belgium	Belgium	1–1	1–2	2019 FIFA Women's World Cup qualification
29.	6 March 2019	GSZ Stadium, Larnaca, Cyprus	North Korea	1–0	3–3 (a.e.t.) (6–7 p)	2019 Cyprus Women's Cup
30.	29 May 2019	Stadio Paolo Mazza, Ferrara, Italy	Switzerland	2–0	3–1	Friendly
31.	14 June 2019	Stade Auguste-Delaune, Reims, France	Jamaica	1–0	5–0	2019 FIFA Women's World Cup
32.	14 June 2019	Stade Auguste-Delaune, Reims, France	Jamaica	2–0	5–0	2019 FIFA Women's World Cup
33.	14 June 2019	Stade Auguste-Delaune, Reims, France	Jamaica	3–0	5–0	2019 FIFA Women's World Cup
34.	29 August 2019	Ramat Gan Stadium, Ramat Gan, Israel	Israel	1–1	3–2	UEFA Women's Euro 2022 qualifying
35.	3 September 2019	Mikheil Meskhi Stadium, Tbilisi, Georgia	Georgia	1–0	1–0	UEFA Women's Euro 2022 qualifying
36.	4 October 2019	Centenary Stadium, Ta' Qali, Malta	Malta	2–0	2–0	UEFA Women's Euro 2022 qualifying
37.	8 October 2019	Stadio Renzo Barbera, Palermo, Italy	Bosnia and Herzegovina	1–0	2–0	UEFA Women's Euro 2022 qualifying
38.	8 November 2019	Stadio Ciro Vigorito, Benevento, Italy	Georgia	3–0	6–0	UEFA Women's Euro 2022 qualifying
39.	4 March 2020	Estádio Algarve, Faro, Portugal	Portugal	2–1	2–1	2020 Algarve Cup
40.	7 March 2020	Vista Municipal Stadium, Parchal, Portugal	New Zealand	1–0	3–0	2020 Algarve Cup
41.	22 September 2020	Bosnia and Herzegovina FA Training Centre, Zenica, Bosnia & Herzegovina	Bosnia and Herzegovina	2–0	5–0	UEFA Women's Euro 2022 qualifying
42.	22 September 2020	Bosnia and Herzegovina FA Training Centre, Zenica, Bosnia & Herzegovina	Bosnia and Herzegovina	3–0	5–0	UEFA Women's Euro 2022 qualifying
43.	22 September 2020	Bosnia and Herzegovina FA Training Centre, Zenica, Bosnia & Herzegovina	Bosnia and Herzegovina	4–0	5–0	UEFA Women's Euro 2022 qualifying
44.	24 February 2021	Stadio Artemio Franchi, Florence, Italy	Israel	5–0	12–0	UEFA Women's Euro 2022 qualifying
45.	10 June 2021	Stadio Paolo Mazza, Ferrera, Italy	Netherlands	1–0	1–0	Friendly
46.	17 September 2021	Stadio Nereo Rocco, Trieste, Italy	Moldova	1–0	3–0	2023 FIFA Women's World Cup qualification
47.	17 September 2021	Stadio Nereo Rocco, Trieste, Italy	Moldova	2–0	3–0	2023 FIFA Women's World Cup qualification
48.	21 September 2021	Stadion Branko Čavlović-Čavlek, Karlovac, Croatia	Croatia	4–0	5–0	2023 FIFA Women's World Cup qualification
49.	22 October 2021	Stadio Teofilo Patini, Castel di Sangro, Italy	Croatia	2–0	3–0	2023 FIFA Women's World Cup qualification
50.	30 November 2021	Stadionul Anghel Iordănescu, Voluntari, Romania	Romania	2–0	5–0	2023 FIFA Women's World Cup qualification
51.	30 November 2021	Stadionul Anghel Iordănescu, Voluntari, Romania	Romania	3–0	5–0	2023 FIFA Women's World Cup qualification
52.	30 November 2021	Stadionul Anghel Iordănescu, Voluntari, Romania	Romania	5–0	5–0	2023 FIFA Women's World Cup qualification
53.	12 April 2022	Stockhorn Arena, Thun, Switzerland	Switzerland	1–0	1–0	2023 FIFA Women's World Cup qualification
54.	24 July 2023	Eden Park, Auckland, New Zealand	Argentina	1–0	1–0	2023 FIFA Women's World Cup
55.	25 October 2024	Stadio Tre Fontane, Rome, Italy	Malta	1–0	5–0	Friendly
56.	8 April 2025	MCH Arena, Herning, Denmark	Denmark	3–0	3–0	2025 UEFA Women's Nations League
57.	3 June 2025	Swansea Stadium, Swansea, Wales	Wales	2–0	4–1	2025 UEFA Women's Nations League
58.	3 June 2025	Swansea Stadium, Swansea, Wales	Wales	4–0	4–1	2025 UEFA Women's Nations League
59.	7 July 2025	Stade de Genève, Geneva, Switzerland	Portugal	1–0	1–1	UEFA Women's Euro 2025
60.	16 July 2025	Stade de Genève, Geneva, Switzerland	Norway	1–0	2–1	UEFA Women's Euro 2025
61.	16 July 2025	Stade de Genève, Geneva, Switzerland	Norway	2–1	2–1	UEFA Women's Euro 2025
62.	14 April 2026	Dubočica Stadium, Leskovac, Serbia	Serbia	1–0	6–0	2027 FIFA Women's World Cup qualification

== Honours ==
Bardolino

- Serie A: 2006-07, 2007–08, 2008–09
- Coppa Italia: 2005-06, 2006–07, 2008–09
- Supercoppa Italiana: 2005, 2007, 2008

Brescia

- Serie A: 2013–14, 2015–16
- Coppa Italia: 2014-15, 2015–16
- Supercoppa Italiana: 2014, 2015, 2016, 2017

Juventus

- Serie A: 2018–19, 2019–20, 2020–21, 2021–22, 2024–25
- Coppa Italia: 2018–19, 2021–22, 2022–23, 2024–25
- Serie A Women's Cup: 2025
- Supercoppa Italiana: 2019-20, 2020–21, 2021–22, 2023-24, 2025-26

Individual

- Serie A Most Valuable Player: 2024–25
- Jogadora de Futebol Feminina do Ano da Série A: 2019–20, 2020–21
- Serie A Women's Team of the Year: 2019–20, 2020–21, 2024–25
- Italian Football Hall of Fame: 2022

== See also ==
- List of FIFA Women's World Cup hat-tricks
