= 2022–23 Coppa Italia (women) =

Football tournament season

2022–23 Italian Women's Cup
Tournament details
- Teams: 26

Final positions
- Champions: Juventus
- Runners-up: Roma

Tournament statistics
- Matches played: 39
- Goals scored: 149 (3.82 per match)

The 2022–23 Italian Women's Cup (Coppa Italia di calcio femminile) was the 51st edition of the Italian women's football national cup. The 2023 Coppa Italia was won by Juventus after beating Roma in the final.

== Final ==
4 June 2023

Juventus	1–0	Roma
Bonansea 90+3'	Report

Stadio Arechi, Salerno
Referee: Michele Delrio
