= Stadio Comunale (Chiavari) =

Multi-purpose stadium in Chiavari, Italy

Coordinates: 44°18′56″N 9°20′14″E

Stadio Enrico Sannazzari
- Interactive map of Stadio Enrico Sannazzari
- Location: Chiavari, Italy
- Owner: City of Chiavari
- Capacity: 5,535

Construction
- Opened: 1933

Tenant
- Virtus Entella

Stadio Comunale Enrico "Richin" Sannazzari is a multi-purpose stadium in Chiavari, Italy. It is mainly used for football matches and hosts the home matches of local Italian Serie B club Virtus Entella. The stadium has a capacity of 5,535 spectators.
