= 2020–21 Supercoppa Italiana (women) =

24rd edition of the Supercoppa Italiana

2020 Supercoppa Italiana
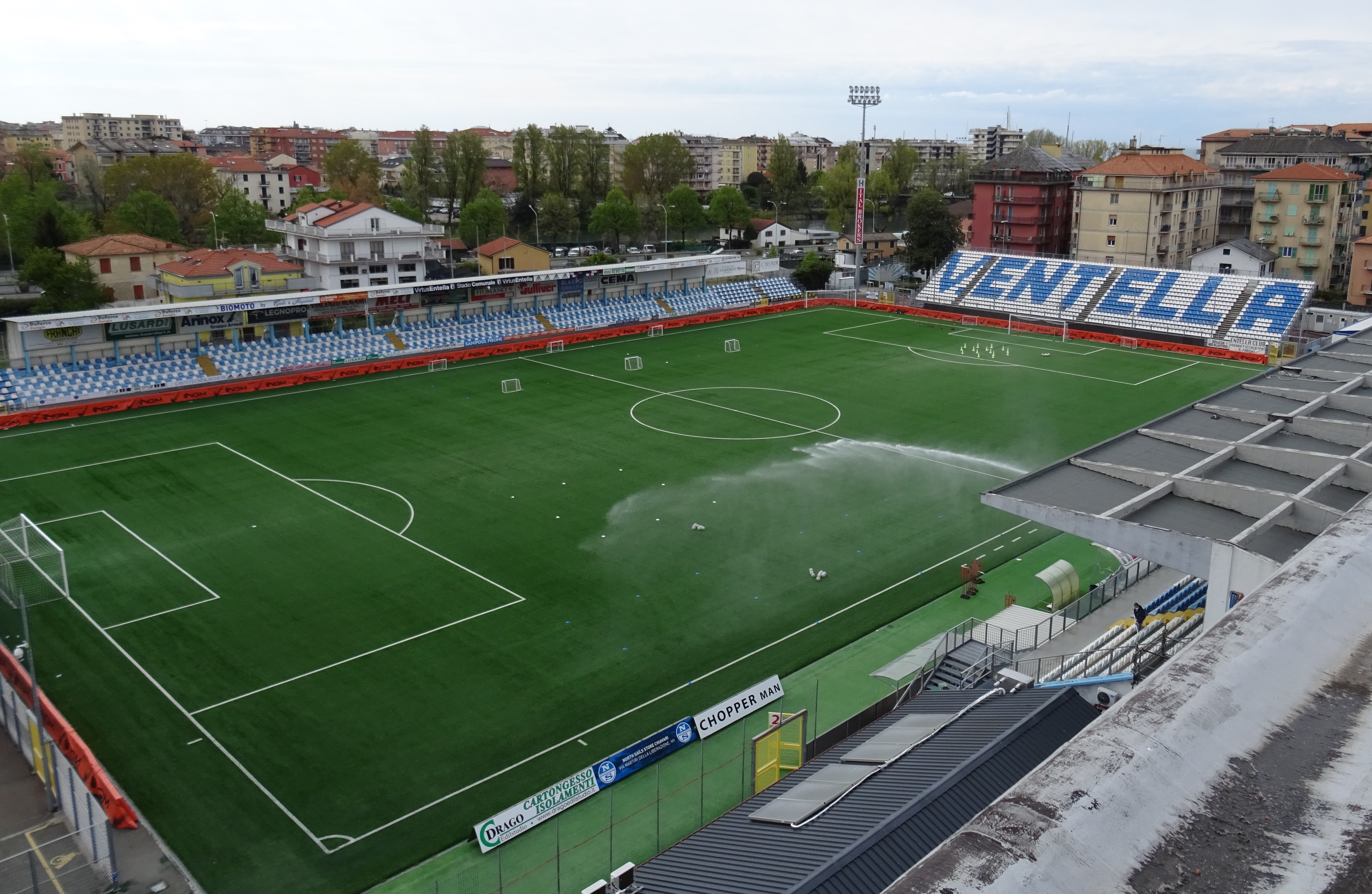
- Stadio Comunale, hosted the final on 10 January 2021

Tournament details
- Country: Italy
- City: Chiavari
- Dates: 6 January 2021-10 January 2021
- Teams: 4

Final positions
- Champions: Juventus (2nd title)
- Runners-up: Fiorentina

Tournament statistics
- Matches played: 3
- Goals scored: 8 (2.67 per match)
- Top goal scorer: Barbara Bonansea (3 goals)

Awards
- Best player: Barbara Bonansea

The 2020 Supercoppa Italiana was the 24th edition of the Supercoppa Italiana.

The matches were played in Chiavari at Stadio Comunale between 6 and 10 January 2022 and Juventus won for the second time in a row.

Usually 2 teams participate in the competition, but the COVID-19 pandemic caused the Coppa Italia to end prematurely and it was decided to involve the best 4 teams of the 2019–20 Serie A: Juventus, Fiorentina, Milan and Roma.

== Qualified teams ==
Italian Football Federation has confirmed that four teams will be competing in 2020 Supercoppa Italiana (women) competition: Juventus, Fiorentina, Milan and Roma. The Federation also confirmed that the semi-finals and the final will be played at a neutral venue.

Team	Qualified as
Juventus	2019–20 Serie A winner
Fiorentina	2019–20 Serie A runners-up
Milan	2019–20 Serie A third place
Roma	2019–20 Serie A fourth place

== Matches ==
=== Bracket ===
Semi-finals
6 January 2021 – Chiavari
Juventus (a.e.t.)	2
Roma	1
6 January 2021 – Chiavari
Fiorentina	2
Milan	1

Final
10 January 2021 – Chiavari
Juventus	2
Fiorentina	0

=== Semi-finals ===
6 January 2021
12:30 CET

Juventus	2–1 (a.e.t.)	Roma
Bonansea 23'; Girelli 116'	Report	Swaby 48'

Stadio Comunale, Chiavari
Referee: Mercenaro

6 January 2021
18:00 CET

Fiorentina	2–1	Milan
Kim 56'; Quinn 65'	Report	Giacinti 6'

Stadio Comunale, Chiavari
Referee: Miele

=== Final ===
10 January 2021
12:30 CET

Juventus	2–0	Fiorentina
Bonansea 39', 55'	Report

Stadio Comunale, Chiavari
Referee: Maria Marotta

== Broadcasting ==
Italian pay-TV broadcaster Sky Italia has secured linear and digital rights to domestic women's club football competitions for the 2020–21 season as part of an extended rights deal with the Italian Football Federation, which includes Supercoppa Italiana (women).

== See also ==
- Supercoppa Italiana (women)
