= 2018–19 Coppa Italia (women) =

Football tournament season

2018–19 Italian Women's Cup
- Dates: 16 September 2018– 28 April 2019

Final positions
- Champions: Juventus
- Runners-up: Fiorentina

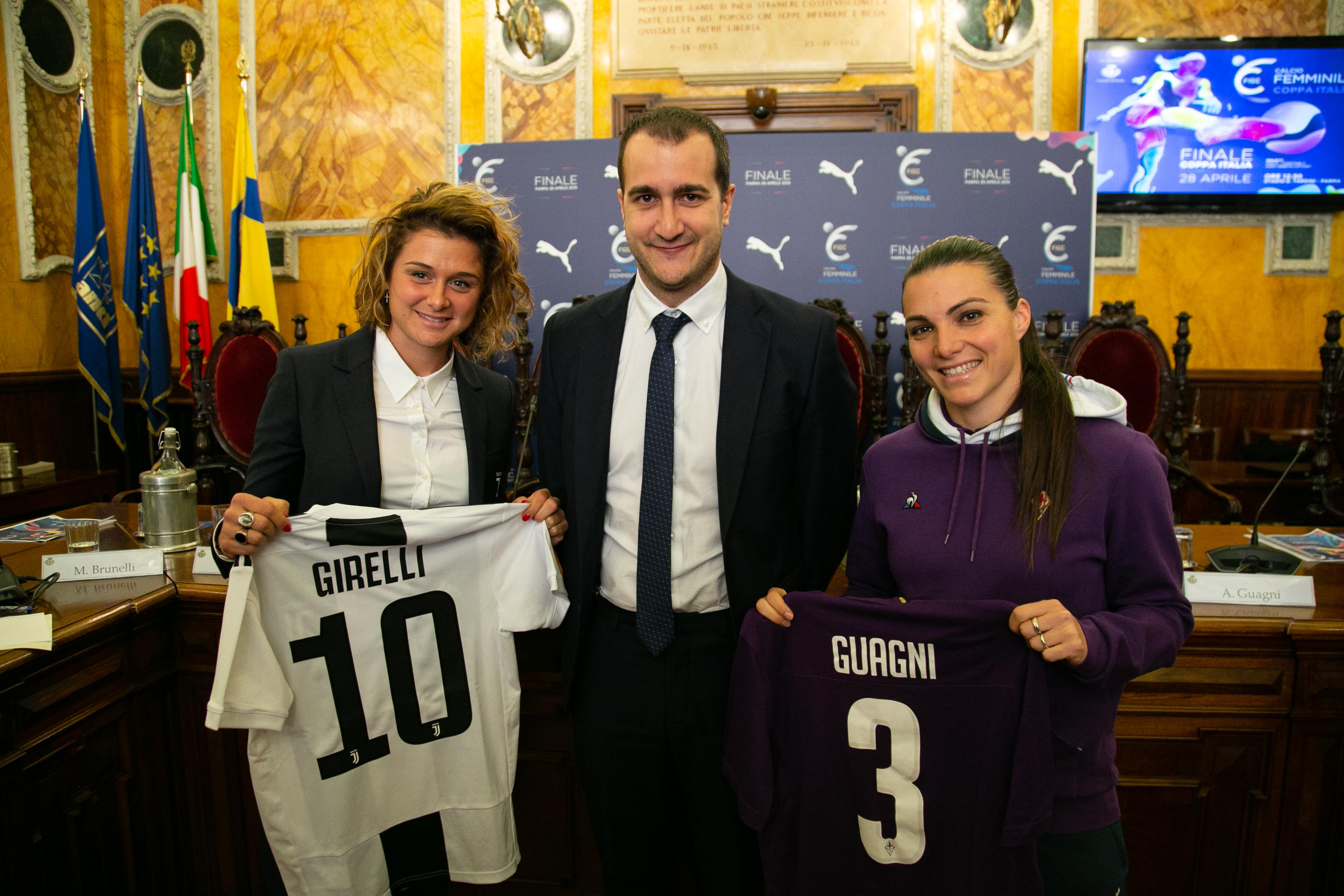
Juventus player Girelli and Fiorentina's Guagni at the final presentation conference

The 2018–19 Italian Women's Cup (Coppa Italia di calcio femminile) was the 47th edition of the Italian women's football national cup. The 2019 Coppa Italia was won by Juventus after beating Fiorentina in the final.
