= Supercoppa Italiana (women) =

Supercoppa Women
- Organiser(s): FIGC
- Founded: 1997; 29 years ago
- Region: Italy
- Teams: 2 (1997–2019; 2022–present); 4 (2020–2021)
- Related competitions: Serie A (qualifier); Coppa Italia (qualifier)
- Current champions: Juventus (5th title)
- Most championships: Torres (7 titles)
- Broadcaster(s): Sky Sport; RAI; DAZN
- Website: figc.it/supercoppa-women
- 2025 Supercoppa Women

The Supercoppa Women (English: Women's Super Cup), also called Supercoppa Ferrovie dello Stato Italiane for national sponsorship with Ferrovie dello Stato Italiane, is a national women's football cup competition in Italy played between the winner of the Serie A and the winner of the Coppa Italia.

Designed as an equivalent to the Supercoppa Italiana in men's football, the competition began in 1997 with the first game played by Modena Femminile and Aircago Agliana.

Torres holds the record for most titles overall, having won seven times. Juventus are the reigning champions, having won their 15th title by defeating Roma in the 2025 edition.

== History ==
The super cup was born in 1997 by initiative of the president of the women's division of LND, Natalina Ceraso Levati, a former soccer player; the first edition were played in Stadio Belvedere between Modena Femminile and Aircago Agliana and saw the now disbanded team from Modena beat the opponent 3-1 and thus win the first Super Cup.

The following two years the cup was conquered by A.C.F. Milan, after them, from 2000 to 2013, Torres won the title seven times. These victories were interspersed with wins by other teams: CF Bardolino (2001, 2005, 2007, 2008), Foroni Verona (2002, 2003) and Fiammamonza (2006).

After Torres's dissolution, the tournament was won four times in a row by Brescia. In 2018 the newborn team Fiorentina won and in 2019 another newborn team, Juventus won the tournament.

By the following edition a new format was adopted, with four participating teams and a final four with two semi-finals and a final on neutral venues. This format was used only for two edition and in 2022 we returned to the previous format.

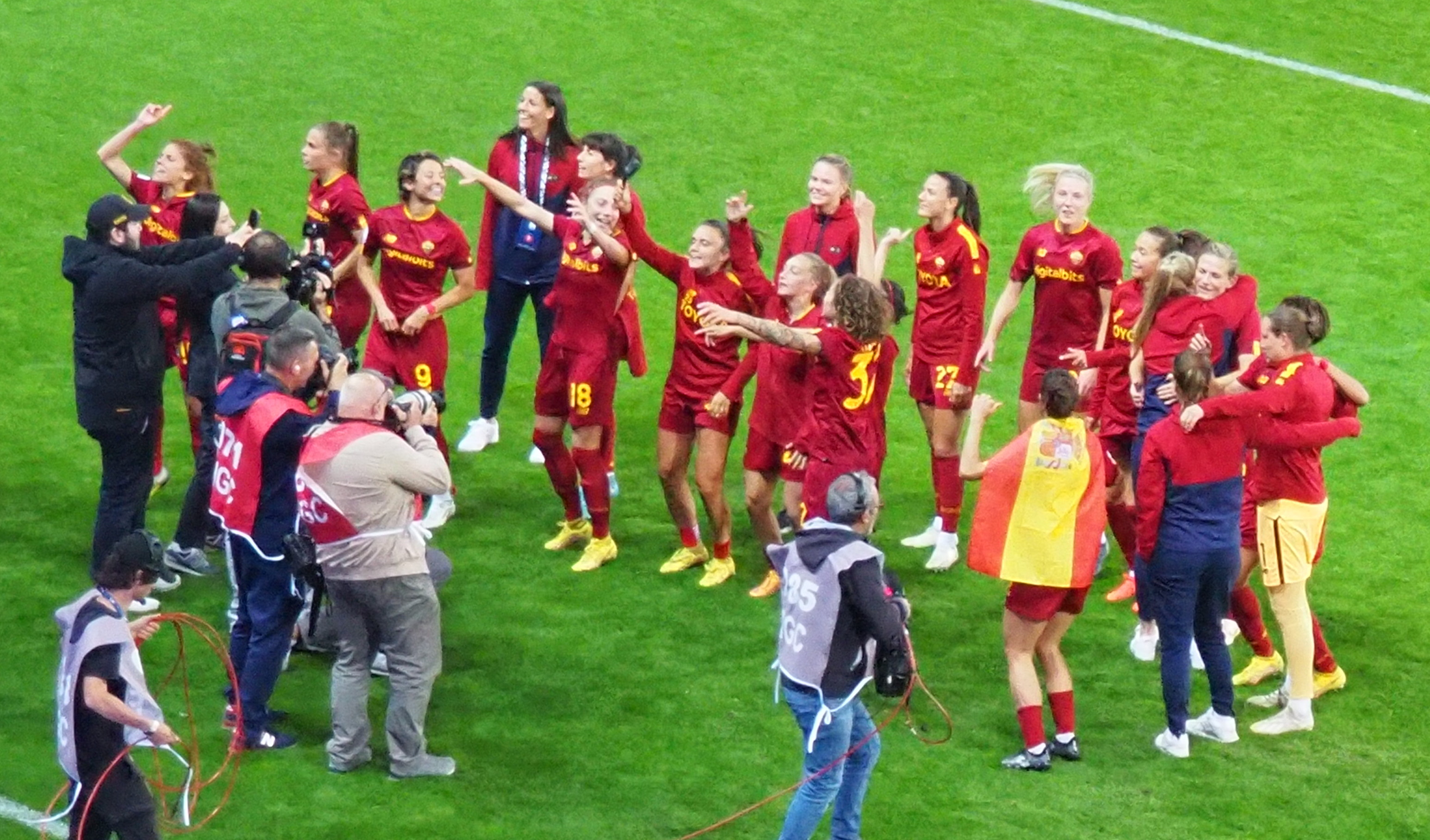
Roma's squad winner of the 2022 edition.

In 2022, Roma became new super cup champions, ending Juventus's winning strike (three wins from 2019 to 2021).

== Winners ==
Year	Serie A winners	Result	Coppa Italia representatives	Stadium	Attendance
1997	Modena Femminile	4–1	Aircago Agliana	Stadio Belvedere, Bardolino	200
1998	Modena Femminile	0–4	ACF Milan	Stadio Daniele Mariotti, Montecatini Terme	100
1999	ACF Milan	0–4	Ruco Line Lazio	Stadio Gino Manni, Colle di Val d'Elsa	200
2000	Torres	4–3	ACF Milan	Stadio Comunale, Santamonica	500
2001	Torres	2–3	Bardolino	Stadio Centro d'Italia – Manlio Scopigno, Rieti	1500
2002	Enterprise Lazio	0–2	Foroni Verona	Stadio Luigi Muzi, Orvieto	500
2003	Foroni Verona	6–1	Decimum Lazio	Stadio Comunale, Montecatini Terme	400
2004	ACF Milan (Note: The match should have pitted Foroni Verona, winner of the 2003-2004 Serie A, against Torres, winner of the 2003-2004 Italian Cup. However, a few weeks before the race, the Veronese club renounced its membership in the championship due to economic problems, also refusing to restart from a lower division and declaring bankruptcy. It was thus decided that ACF Milan, third in the previous championship, would compete in the unusual edition of the Super Cup.)	0–5	Torres	Stadio Mariotti, Alghero	1500
2005	Bardolino Verona	1–0	Torres	Centro Tecnico Federale, Coverciano	-
2006	Fiammamonza	1–0	Bardolino Verona	Stadio Comunale, Saint-Vincent	500
2007	Bardolino Verona	1–0	Torino Women	Stadio Gino Alfonso Sada, Monza	2000
2008	Bardolino Verona	1–0	Torres	Stadio Belvedere, Bardolino	1000
2009	Bardolino Verona	1–2	Torres	Stadio Bacigalupo, Taormina	-
2010	Torres	2–0	Reggiana	Stadio Morandi, Umbertide	-
2011	Torres	2–1	Graphistudio Tavagnacco	Stadio Italo Nicoletti, Riccione	-
2012	Torres	2–1	Brescia	Stadio Romeo Galli, Imola	-
2013	Torres	2–1	Graphistudio Tavagnacco	Stadio Enrico Nanni, Bellaria – Igea Marina	-
2014	Brescia	1–1 (a.e.t.) (4–3 p)	Graphistudio Tavagnacco	Stadio Gino Corsaro, Montecchio Maggiore	-
2015	Bardolino Verona	0–0 (a.e.t.) (2–3 p)	Brescia	Stadio Ugo Lisetti, Castiglione delle Stiviere	2000
2016	Brescia	2–0	Bardolino Verona	Stadio Rino Mercante, Bassano del Grappa	1500
2017	Fiorentina	1–4	Brescia	Stadio Tullo Morgagni, Forlì	1200
2018	Juventus	0–1	Fiorentina	Stadio Alberto Picco, La Spezia	-
2019	Juventus	2–0	Fiorentina	Stadio Dino Manuzzi, Cesena	-
2020	Juventus	2–0	Fiorentina	Stadio Comunale, Chiavari	-
2021	Juventus	2–1	AC Milan	Stadio Benito Stirpe, Frosinone	-
2022	Juventus	1–1 (a.e.t.) (3–4 p)	Roma	Stadio Ennio Tardini, Parma	3500
2023	Roma	1–2	Juventus	Stadio Giovanni Zini, Cremona	6600
2024	Roma	3–1	Fiorentina	Stadio Alberto Picco, La Spezia	2500
2025	Juventus	2–1	Roma	Stadio Adriatico – Giovanni Cornacchia, Pescara	6000
