= 2019–20 Serie A (women) =

Serie A (women)
- Season: 2019–20
- Dates: 14 September 2019 – 25 June 2020
- Champions: Juventus (3rd title)
- Relegated: Tavagnacco; Orobica
- Women's Champions League: Juventus; Fiorentina
- Matches: 95
- Goals: 307 (3.23 per match)
- Top goalscorer: Cristiana Girelli (16 goals)
- Biggest home win: Sassuolo 6–0 Orobica (1 February 2020); Roma 6–0 Verona (15 February 2020)
- Biggest away win: Orobica 1–7 Juventus (7 December 2019)
- Highest scoring: Milan 6–3 Pink Bari (29 January 2020)
- Longest winning run: Juventus (7 matches)
- Longest losing run: Orobica (15 matches)

The 2019–20 Serie A (women) was the 53rd season of the women's football top-level league in Italy. The season was scheduled to run from 14 September 2019 to 16 May 2020, however on 9 March 2020, the Italian government halted the league until 3 April 2020 due to the COVID-19 pandemic in Italy. Play did not resume, and the season was terminated on 8 June 2020. On 25 June, Juventus, unbeaten first placed in the championship prior the lockdown, was awarded the championship title by the FIGC.

== Teams ==
=== Stadiums and locations ===
Locations of the 2019–20 Serie A teams

Team	Home city	Stadium	2018–19 season
Empoli	Empoli	Centro sportivo Monteboro	2nd in Serie B
Fiorentina	Florence	Stadio Gino Bozzi	2nd in Serie A
Florentia	San Gimignano	Stadio Santa Lucia	7th in Serie A
Inter	Milan	Stadio Felice Chinetti	1st in Serie B
Juventus	Turin	Juventus Center	Champions
Milan	Milan	Stadio Brianteo (Monza)	3rd in Serie A
Orobica	Bergamo	Centro Sportivo "Facchetti" (Cologno al Serio)	12th in Serie A
Pink Bari	Bari	Stadio Antonio Antonucci (Bitetto)	11th in Serie A
Roma	Rome	Stadio Tre Fontane	4th in Serie A
Sassuolo	Sassuolo	Stadio comunale Mirabello (Reggio Emilia)	5th in Serie A
Tavagnacco	Tavagnacco	Stadio Comunale Tavagnacco	8th in Serie A
Hellas Verona	Verona	Stadio Aldo Olivieri	10th in Serie A

== League table ==
Pos	Team	Pld	W	D	L	GF	GA	GD	Pts	Qualification or relegation
1	Juventus (C)	16	14	2	0	48	10	+38	44	Qualification to Champions League
2	Fiorentina	15	11	2	2	40	15	+25	35	Qualification to Champions League
3	Milan	15	11	2	2	35	15	+20	35	
4	Roma	16	11	1	4	41	17	+24	34	
5	Sassuolo	16	7	2	7	29	19	+10	23	
6	Inter	16	5	4	7	20	27	−7	19	
7	Florentia	16	7	3	6	24	26	−2	24	
8	Empoli	16	5	4	7	22	24	−2	19	
9	Verona	16	3	3	10	16	39	−23	12	
10	Pink Bari	16	1	8	7	14	26	−12	11	
11	Tavagnacco (R)	16	2	4	10	9	32	−23	10	Relegation to Serie B
12	Orobica (R)	16	0	1	15	6	51	−45	1	Relegation to Serie B

Source: soccerway.com
Rules for classification: 1) Points; 2) Goal difference; 3) Number of goals scored; 4) Head-to-head points; 5) Head-to-head goal difference; 6) Head-to-head away goals scored
(C) Champions; (R) Relegated
