= 2019 Supercoppa Italiana (women) =

23rd edition of the Supercoppa Italiana

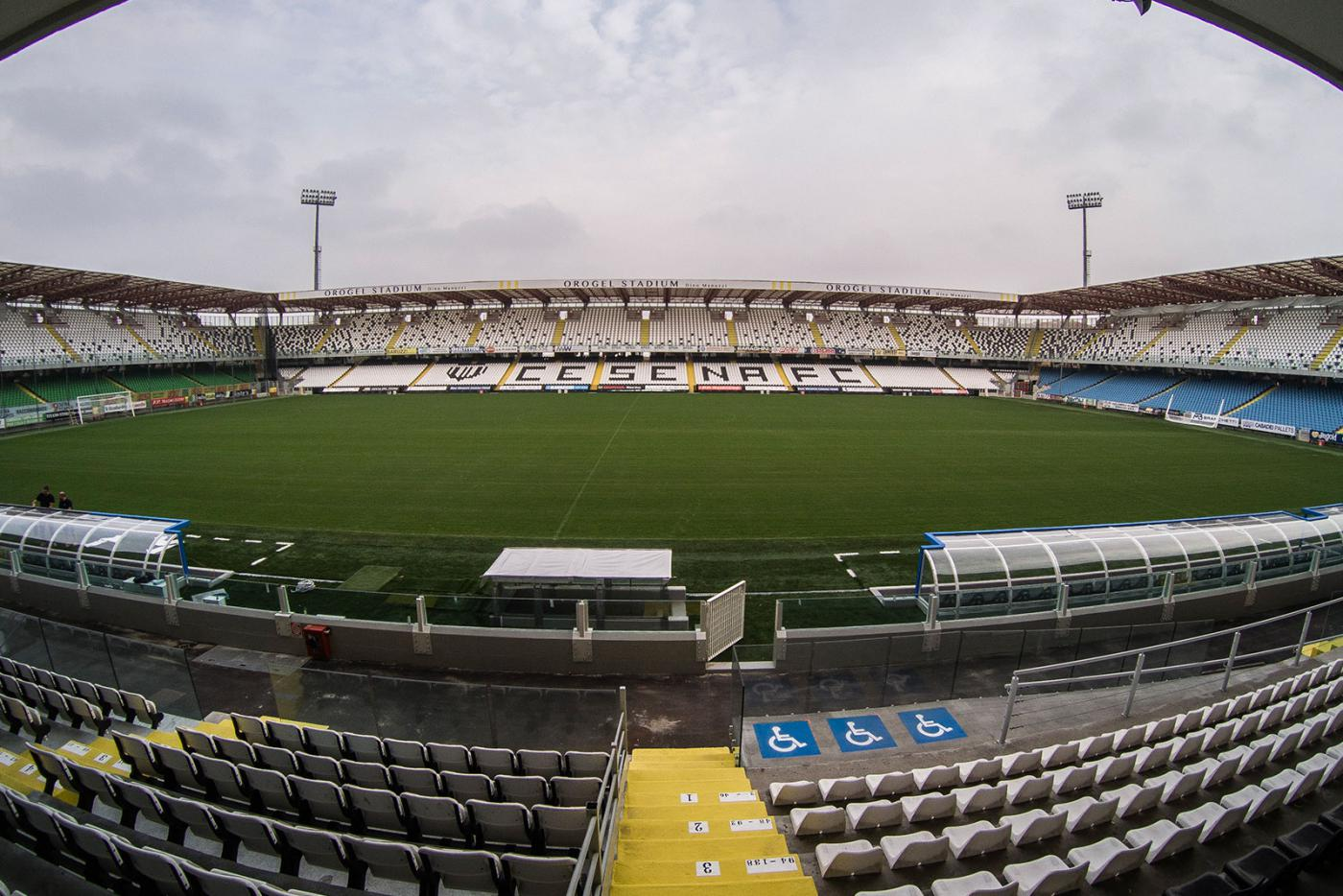
- Stadio Dino Manuzzi, hosted the final on 27 October 2019
- Event: Supercoppa Italiana (women)
Juventus	Fiorentina
Serie A	Coppa Italia
2	0
- Date: 27 October 2019
- Venue: Stadio Dino Manuzzi, Cesena
- Referee: Pirratore

The 2019 Supercoppa Italiana was the 23rd edition of the Supercoppa Italiana. It was contested by Juventus, the 2018–19 Serie A and 2018–19 Italian Women's Cup champions and Fiorentina, the runners-up of the two competitions.

The match was played in Cesena at Stadio Dino Manuzzi on 27 October 2019 and Juventus won their first title.

== Match ==
27 October 2019
20:30 UTC+01:00

Juventus	2–0	Fiorentina
Girelli 12' *Stašková 90+2'	Report

Stadio Dino Manuzzi, Cesena
Referee: Pirratore
