= Alessandra Massa =

Italian footballer (born 2002)

Personal information
- Date of birth: 17 March 2002 (age 24)
- Place of birth: Genoa, Italy
- Position: Forward

Team information
- Current team: Genoa
- Number: 45

Youth career
- ?–2019: Genoa Youth
- 2020–2021: AS Roma

Senior career*
Years	Team	Apps	(Gls)
2019–2020	Genoa	8	(13)
2020–2021	→ AS Roma	0	(0)
2021–2022	→ San Marino Academy	26	(4)
2022–2023	→ ChievoVerona Women	16	(4)
2023–	Genoa	57	(6)

International career^{‡}
2018	Italy U16	3	(0)
- * Club domestic league appearances and goals as of 11 November 2026 ‡ National team caps and goals as of 2 February 2026

Alessandra Massa (born 17 March 2002) is an Italian footballer who plays as a forward for Genoa C.F.C. Women in the Italian Serie A.

== Career ==
Alessandra Massa has had a passion for football since she was a child, starting playing in Camogli. She is a Genoa CFC fan.

She grew up as a footballer in the youth ranks of Genoa Cricket & F. C., until she reached Genoa first squad, in 2019. Since that Giada Abate was busy with U16 Italian National team, Massa became the first Genoa player to wear captain's armband in the club history, during Coppa Italia Eccellenza.

In March 2019 Genoa female youth club subscribed to Torneo di Viareggio, one of the most important youth football tournaments in the world, that finally admitted female club. Here Alessandra Massa played all three matches of the group stage with Genoa, until Genoa got eliminated subsequently to two defeats (against Fiorentina and Inter) and one victory (against Spezia).

During her first season in Genoa senior team, she scored 13 goals in Eccellenza 2019/2020, becoming the best scorer of the team, ex aequo to Giulia Parodi. Genoa will win the stage, obtaining 10 wins out of 10, getting promoted in Serie C.

In February 2020 Genoa played again the Torneo di Viareggio, defeating Westchester 2–0, drawing 2–2 with Fiorentina and drawing 1–1 with Sassuolo. Then Genoa got eliminated by Roma in the semifinal. At the end of the tournament Alessandra Massa got nominated in the top 11 of the edition.

At the end of the season she moved on loan to AS Roma, a Serie A team with whom Massa made an only cap in senior squad in Coppa Italia 2020/2021, scoring a goal during the group stage. The team will win the tournament at the end of the year. With Roma youth team Alessandra Massa won two national titles, winning the final for the Scudetto in 2020 (postponed due to covid) and then winning again the championship in 2021.

In the 2021/2022 season Massa came back in Serie B, playing a season for San Marino Academy and scoring 4 goals in 26 appearances (the most capped player of the team in that season), then she moved to ChievoVerona Women, again in the second level of Italian female football, scoring 4 goals in 17 caps. Both the experiences were on loan from Genoa Women.

In the summer of 2023 Massa returned in Genoa, playing 17 matches and scoring 3 goals before a serious injury to the cruciate ligament, happened in April 2024.

She didn't play for 322 days, until her comeback on 3 March 2025, when she came off the bench at 76' of a 0–0 against Bologna. She scored for the first time after the injury on 10 March 2025 (Genoa-Brescia 3–0).

At the end of the 2024–2025 season, she achieved with Genoa the club's first historic promotion to Serie A. On August 22, 2025, she made her debut as a starter and professional player in the newly established Serie A Women's Cup, in the match Genoa vs Inter 1–2. On October 5, 2025, she made her debut in Serie A, in the match Genoa vs Milan 1–2.

== International career ==
In February 2018, she was called up by Nazzarena Grilli for a tournament in the Algarve region of Portugal with the Under-16 national team. There, Alessandra played in three matches – against the Netherlands, Portugal, and Germany – between February 15 and 19.

== Achievements ==
She scored the first official goal in Genoa's history.

Since she won all the matches of the 2019–2020 season with Genoa and all the matches of the 2020–2021 season with Roma, she became the first female player in Italian history to win every seasonal game with two different clubs.

Since she managed to score just 4 minutes into her debut for Roma, she remains the fastest debut scorer in the history of the women's senior team. If we include the entire club history, she ranks second overall, behind Siniša Mihajlović, who scored 3 minutes into his debut for the men's team.

Not only she was the first captain in Genoa's history (October 20, 2019, Superba–Genoa 0–5), but on September 21, 2025, she also became the first captain under whom Genoa won a professional match (Hellas Verona–Genoa 0–4).

== Career statistics ==
As of 11 November 2026

Appearances and goals by club, season and competition
Club	Season	League			National cup (Note: Includes Coppa Italia and Coppa Italia Eccellenza)		League cup (Note: Serie A Women's Cup)		Total	
Club	Season	Division	Apps	Goals	Apps	Goals	Apps	Goals	Apps	Goals
Genoa	2019–20	Eccellenza	8	13	4	4	—		12	17
Genoa	2020–21	Serie C	0	0	0	0	—		0	0
Genoa	2021–22	Serie C	0	0	0	0	—		0	0
Genoa	2022–23	Serie B	0	0	0	0	—		0	0
Genoa	2023–24	Serie B	19	3	0	0	—		19	3
Genoa	2024–25	Serie B	10	1	0	0	—		10	1
Genoa	2025–26	Serie A	20	0	2	0	3	0	25	0
Genoa	2026–27	Serie B	8	2	1	0	—		9	2
Genoa	Total		65	19	7	4	3	0	75	23
Roma (loan)	2020–21	Serie A	0	0	1	1	—		1	1
San Marino Academy (loan)	2021–22	Serie B	26	4	2	0	—		28	4
ChievoVerona (loan)	2022–23	Serie B	16	4	4	0	—		20	4
Career total			107	27	14	5	3	0	124	32

== Honours ==
Genoa

- Eccellenza 2019/2020

Roma

- Coppa Italia 2020/2021
- Campionato Primavera 2019/2020
- Campionato Primavera 2020/2021
