= Eleonora Oliva =

Italian footballer (born 1998)

Personal information
- Date of birth: 8 August 1998 (age 28)
- Place of birth: Lavagna, Italy
- Height: 1.66 m (5 ft 5 in)
- Position: Defender

Team information
- Current team: Genoa CFC
- Number: 23

Youth career
- 2014–2015: Lavagnese

Senior career*
Years	Team	Apps	(Gls)
2015–2018	Lavagnese	33+	(7)
2018–2019	Genoa	21	(0)
2019–2020	Cesena	13	(0)
2020–2022	Hellas Verona	25	(0)
2022	Napoli	4	(0)
2022–	Genoa	35	(0)
- * Club domestic league appearances and goals as of 19 May 2024

Eleonora Oliva (born 8 August 1998) is an Italian professional footballer who plays as a defender for Serie B club Genoa CFC.

== Career ==
In her first year with Lavagnese, Eleonora Oliva won the junior championship. In the second year, her team finished second in Serie C. In 2016/17, they won the Serie C championship and they reached the semi-finals of the Coppa Italia Eccelenza. Finally, in 2017/18, they participated in the Serie B.

In 2018, Lavagnese's women's team was acquired by Genoa. The club was then relegated from Serie B at the end of the 2018/19 season. In 2019, Oliva moved to Cesena where she made 13 appearances before the season stopped due to the COVID-19 pandemic.

In 2020, she moved to Serie A club Hellas Verona. She stayed for two years making 25 appearances in total as the team finished 9th in 2020/21 and 12th in 2021/22. She then moved to Serie B club Napoli on 10 July 2022, but left only 5 months later to rejoin Genoa. Napoli went on to finish 1st and win promotion to the Serie A.

== Honours ==
Lavagnese

- Serie C: 2016/17

Napoli

- Serie B: 2022/23
