= List of women's football clubs in Italy =

There are five women's football leagues in Italy. This is a list of Italian women's clubs.

== Serie A ==
=== Current ===
The following clubs are in the Serie A (women's football) for the 2024–25 season:

- Como Women
- Fiorentina
- Inter Milan
- Juventus
- Lazio
- Milan
- Napoli
- Roma
- Sampdoria
- Sassuolo

== Serie B ==
=== Current ===
The following clubs are in the Serie B (women's football) for the 2024–25 season:

- Arezzo
- Bologna
- Brescia
- Cesena
- Chievo Verona
- Freedom
- Genoa
- Hellas Verona
- Lumezzane
- Orobica Bergamo
- Parma
- Pavia Academy
- Res Women
- San Marino Academy
- Ternana
- Vis Mediterranea

== See also ==
- Women's football in Italy
- List of women's football teams
- List of women's national football teams
- International competitions in women's association football
