= Emma Errico =

Italian footballer (born 1994)

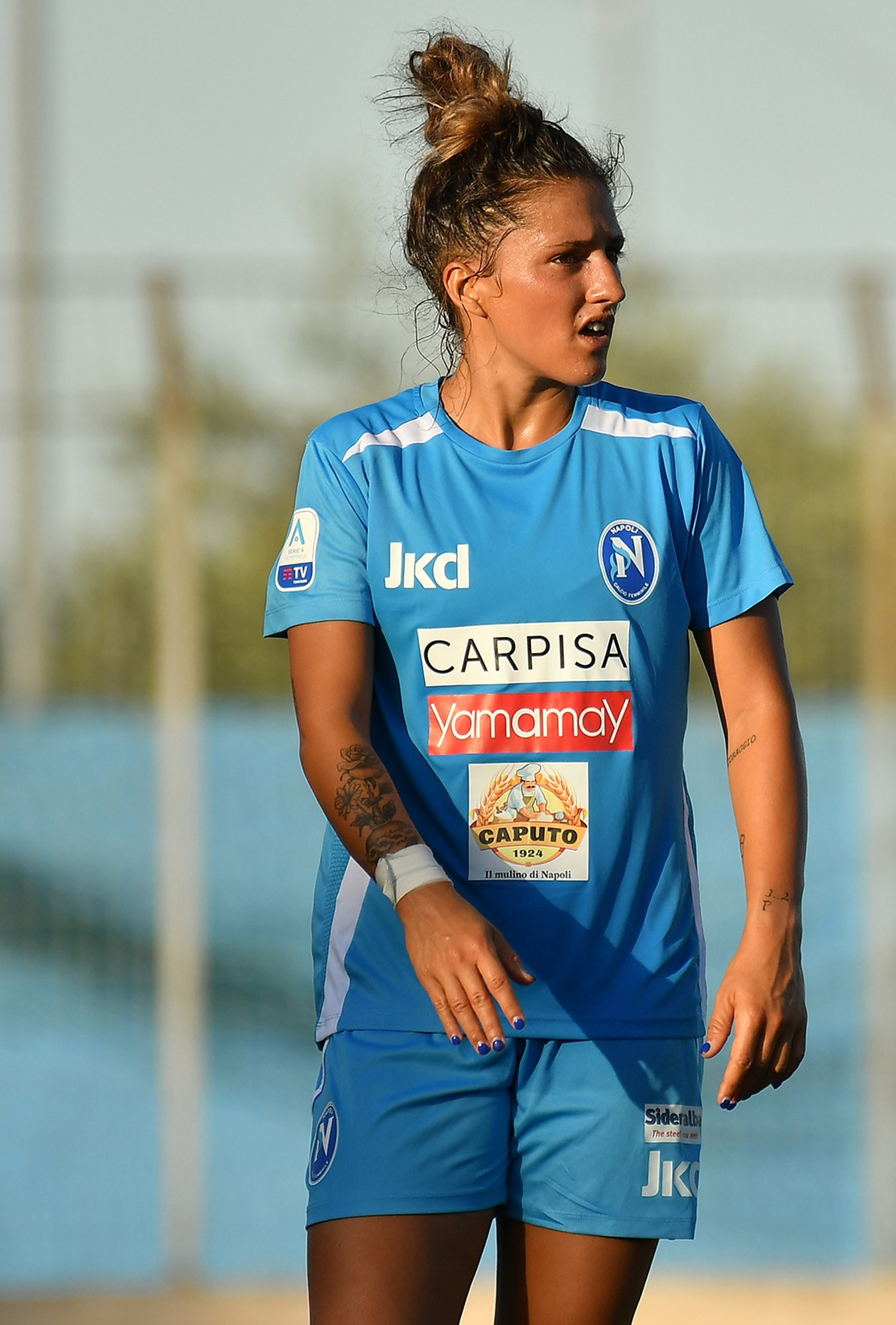

Personal information
- Full name: Raffaella Emma Errico
- Date of birth: 21 March 1994 (age 32)
- Place of birth: Savona, Italy
- Position: Midfielder

Team information
- Current team: Genoa CFC Women

Senior career*
Years	Team	Apps	(Gls)
2008–2014	Amicizia Lagaccio	108	(12)
2014–2017	Cuneo	68	(13)
2017–2018	San Zaccaria	23	(8)
2018–2019	Tavagnacco	21	(1)
2019–2020	Sassuolo	10	(0)
2020-2021	Napoli	20	(1)
2021–2022	Hellas Verona	7	(0)
2022	Napoli	10	(0)
2022–2023	Parma	0	(0)
2023–	Genoa	23	(0)
- * Club domestic league appearances and goals as of 5 May 2024

Raffaella Emma Errico (born 21 March 1994) is an Italian professional footballer who plays as a midfielder for Parma.

== Honours ==
Cuneo

- Serie B (1): 2015/16
