= 2025–26 Serie B (women) =

Serie B Femminile
- Season: 2025–26
- Dates: 7 September 2025 – 17 May 2026
- Champions: Como 1907 (1st title)
- Relegated: Venezia; Trastevere
- Matches: 175
- Goals: 556 (3.18 per match)
- Top goalscorer: Romina Pinna (17)
- All statistics correct as of 11 May 2026.

The 2025–26 season of the Serie B is the 55th season of Italy's second women's football tier. The league will begin on 7 September 2025 and will end on 17 May 2026.

== Teams ==
Locations of teams in the 2024–25 Serie B Femminile.

=== Team changes ===
==== To Serie B ====
Relegated from Serie A

- none

Promoted from Serie C

- Venezia
- Vicenza
- Trastevere
- Frosinone

==== From Serie B ====
Promoted to Serie A

- Genoa
- Ternana
- Parma

Relegated to Serie C

- Chievo Verona
- Orobica Bergamo
- Pavia Academy
- Vis Mediterranea

=== Stadiums and locations ===
Team	Home city	Home ground	Capacity
Arezzo	Arezzo	Stadio Città di Arezzo	13,128
Bologna	Bologna	Campo sportivo Luciano Bonarelli	
Brescia	Brescia	Centro sportivo Mario Rigamonti, campo nº2	
Cesena	Cesena	Centro sportivo Romagna Centro	500
Como 1907	Como	Stadio La Marmora-Pozzo	5,210
Freedom	Cuneo	Stadio Fratelli Paschiero	3,060
Frosinone	Frosinone	Stadio Benito Stirpe	16,227
Lumezzane	Lumezzane	Stadio Tullio Saleri	4,150
Res Roma	Rome	Campo sportivo Raimondo Vianello	
San Marino Academy	Città di San Marino	Campo sportivo Acquaviva	2,000
Trastevere	Roma	Trastevere Stadium	
Venezia	Venezia	Campo sportivo Giuseppe Taliercio	240
Hellas Verona	Verona	Stadio Aldo Olivieri	2,900
Vicenza	Vicenza	Stadio comunale Sergio Ceroni	

=== Personnel and kits ===
Team	President	Manager	Captain	Kit manufacturer	Shirt sponsors (front)	Shirt sponsors (back)	Shirt sponsors (sleeve)	Shorts sponsors
Arezzo	(Italy) Massimo Anselmi	(Italy) Andrea Benedetti	(Italy) Costanza Razzolini	Zeus	Chimeragold UnoAErre	estra	None	Poliopposti
Bologna	(Canada) Joey Saputo	(Italy) Dario Di Donato	TBA	Macron	Elisabetta Franchi	dBTechnologies	Lavoropiù	None
Brescia	(Italy) Clara Gorno	(Italy) Damiano Zenoni	(Italy) Veronique Brayda	Macron	Edilmarket	Argo Metal	Veralab	Colosio
Cesena	(Italy) Massimo Magnani	(Italy) Roberto Rossi	(Italy) Chiara Groff	Erreà	Vitobello Ricambi	E.CO Energia Corrente	None	None
Como 1907	(Indonesia) Mirwan Suwarso	(Italy) Selena Mazzantini	TBA	Adidas	TBA	TBA	TBA	TBA
Freedom	(Italy) Danilo Merlo	(Italy) Michele Ardito	(Italy) Emma Errico	Umbro	None	None	None	None
Frosinone	(Italy) Maurizio Stirpe	(Italy) Francesco Foglietta	TBA	Zeus	MeglioBanca	TBA	TBA	TBA
Lumezzane	(Italy) Andrea Caracciolo	(Italy) Nicoletta Mazza	TBA	Acerbis	Camozzi	Pederzani Impianti	Lume	None
Res Roma	(United States) Matt Rizzetta	(Italy) Alessandro Di Martino	TBA	Diaza	None	TBA	TBA	TBA
San Marino Academy	(San Marino) Raschi Lorenzo	(Italy) Giacomo Piva	(Italy) Giorgia Bertolotti	Erreà	Marlù	TBA	TBA	TBA
Trastevere	(Italy) Pier Luigi Betturri	(Italy) Claudio Ciferri	TBA	Kappa	Kyndes Expert	EDI Pro	None	None
Venezia	(United States) Duncan L. Niederauer	(Belgium) Luís Oliveira	TBA	Nocta	Crosta Mollica	TBA	TBA	TBA
Hellas Verona	(United States) Italo Zanzi	(Spain) Joan Moll	TBA	Joma	None	None	None	None
Vicenza	(Italy) Maran Erika	(Italy) Fabio Viviani	TBA	Erreà	AIX Capital	None	None	None

== League table ==
Pos	Team	Pld	W	D	L	GF	GA	GD	Pts	Promotion or relegation
1	Como (C, P)	25	21	3	1	68	19	+49	66	Promotion to 2026–27 Serie A
2	Lumezzane	25	17	4	4	50	23	+27	55	
3	Cesena	25	16	2	7	59	33	+26	50	
4	Donna Roma	25	12	6	7	50	40	+10	42	
5	Bologna	25	12	4	9	48	37	+11	40	
6	Freedom	25	10	9	6	48	43	+5	39	
7	Frosinone	25	9	6	10	36	39	−3	33	
8	Vicenza	25	9	6	10	32	32	0	33	
9	Brescia	25	9	5	11	36	41	−5	32	
10	San Marino Academy	25	8	4	13	31	48	−17	28	
11	Arezzo	25	7	5	13	26	41	−15	26	
12	Hellas Verona	25	4	7	14	27	46	−19	19	
13	Trastevere (R)	25	3	5	17	22	48	−26	14	Relegation to 2026–27 Serie C
14	Venezia (R)	25	3	4	18	24	67	−43	13	Relegation to 2026–27 Serie C

Source: FIGC.it
Rules for classification: Tiebreakers
(C) Champions; (P) Promoted; (R) Relegated

== See also ==
- 2025–26 Coppa Italia (women)
