= Alice Campora =

Italian footballer (born 2001)

Personal information
- Date of birth: 10 January 2001 (age 25)
- Place of birth: Genoa, Italy
- Position: Midfielder

Team information
- Current team: Sampdoria
- Number: 20

Youth career
- 2014–2016: Sant'Eusebio
- 2016–2018: Ligorna
- 2018–2019: Genoa

Senior career*
Years	Team	Apps	(Gls)
2016-2018	Ligorna	30	(3)
2018–2019	Genoa Women	4	(0)
2019–2025	Genoa	139	(26)
2025	→ OGC Nice	5	(0)
2026-	Sampdoria	0	(0)
- * Club domestic league appearances and goals as of 21 August 2026 ‡ National team caps and goals as of 21 August 2026

Alice Campora (born 10 January 2001) is an Italian footballer who plays as a midfielder for UC Sampdoria.

== Personal life ==
In March 2025 she graduated in Economics and Commerce.

== Career ==
Campora began as a footballer in Sant'Eusebio. In 2016 she moved to Ligorna, where she made her senior debut in Serie B at 15, remaining with the Genoese team for the 2017–2018 season, when she scored 3 goals in Serie B.

Campora has played with the Genoa senior team since its creation in 2019, when Genoa achieved the first position in Eccellenza, winning 10 out of 10 matches before the tournament stopped due to the COVID-19 pandemic.

In the 2020/21 and 2021/22 season, Campora played in Serie C, making 49 appearances and scoring 9 goals. Genoa acquired the sporting title of the women's Serie B team Cortefranca in the summer of 2022 and obtained with it the right to register for Serie B, where Alice made 56 caps and scored 7 goals in two years.

== Career statistics ==
As of 17 November 2025

Appearances and goals by club, season and competition
Club	Season	League			National cup (Note: Includes Coppa Italia, Coppa Italia Serie C, Coppa Italia Eccellenza and Coupe de France Féminine)		League cup (Note: Coupe LFFP)		Total	
Club	Season	Division	Apps	Goals	Apps	Goals	Apps	Goals	Apps	Goals
Ligorna	2016–17	Serie B	14	0	0	0	—		14	0
Ligorna	2017–18	Serie B	24	3	2	0	—		26	3
Ligorna	Total		38	3	2	0	—		40	3
Genoa Women	2018–19	Serie B	4	0	0	0	—		4	0
Genoa	2019–20	Eccellenza	10	7	4	5	—		14	12
Genoa	2020–21	Serie C	20	3	1	0	—		21	3
Genoa	2021–22	Serie C	29	6	3	0	—		32	6
Genoa	2022–23	Serie B	29	3	2	0	—		31	3
Genoa	2023–24	Serie B	26	4	1	0	—		27	4
Genoa	2024–25	Serie B	25	3	1	0	—		26	3
Genoa	Total		139	26	12	5	—		151	31
Nice (loan)	2025–26	Seconde Ligue	5	0	0	0	3	0	8	0
Career total			186	29	14	5	3	0	203	34
