= Arianna Acuti =

Italian footballer (born 1996)

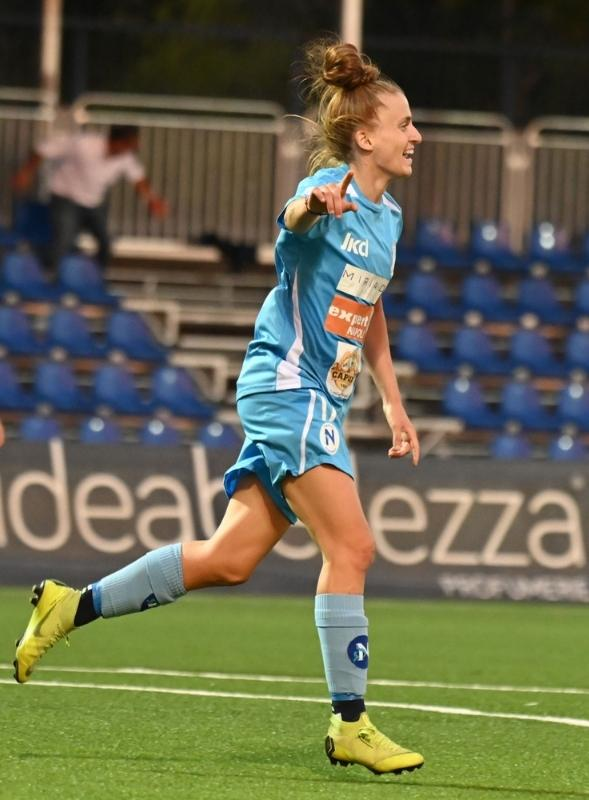

Personal information
- Date of birth: 20 October 1996 (age 30)
- Place of birth: Massa Marittima, Italy
- Position: Forward

Team information
- Current team: Genoa CFC Women

Senior career*
Years	Team	Apps	(Gls)
2011–2013	Siena	3	(1)
2013–2016	Castelfranco	50	(23)
2016–2021	Empoli	98	(29)
2021–2022	Napoli	18	(1)
2022–2023	Parma	10	(1)
2023–	Genoa	51	(15)
- * Club domestic league appearances and goals as of 19 May 2024

Arianna Acuti (born 20 October 1996) is an Italian professional footballer who plays as a striker for Parma.

A forward who has spent her entire career in Italy, Acuti has over 100 league appearances in the Italian league system. She is primarily known for her five-year spell at Empoli, where she made 98 league appearances and was part of two squads promoted to Serie A.

== Career ==
Whilst Acuti was at Siena, she was part of the team that in 2012, got promoted to the Serie A Femminile, but due to the club's economic situation, got relegated to Serie C. She stayed with the team as a youth player.

Acuti was part of the Empoli squad that was promoted to the Serie A Femminile after finishing in second place. She finished the 2019–20 season with 15 league appearances and 3 goals.

On 7 July 2021, Acuti was announced at Napoli, reuniting with her former coach Pistolesi.

On 25 July 2022, Acuti was announced at Parma. On 15 October 2022, she scored her first goal for Parma, scoring against Como 1907 as Como recorded their first ever victory in Serie A.

On 19 July 2023, Acuti was announced at Genoa. She scored her first league goals for the club against Ravenna Calcio, scoring a brace on 14 January 2024. During the 2023–24 season, Acuti finished the season with 28 league appearances and three goals. She scored a hattrick against ChievoVerona on 3 November 2024. On 11 April 2025, she signed a three-year contract extension with the club. She finished the 2024–25 season with 23 league appearances and 12 goals.

== Honours ==
Empoli

- Serie B (1): 2016/17
