= 2024–25 Serie C (women) =

Serie C Femminile
- Season: 2024–25
- Dates: 8 September 2024 – 1 June 2025
- Matches: 21
- Goals: 81 (3.86 per match)
- All statistics correct as of 8 September 2024.

The 2024–25 season of the Serie C is the 7th iteration of Italy's third-tier amateur women's football league.

On 30 July 2024, Serie C organiser LND announced that only 46 teams will participate in the 2024–25 edition as opposed to the usual 48, due to disinterest from clubs to register their women's teams.

The composition of the groups for the 2024–25 edition has been announced on 6 August 2024. The groups were announced with 15 teams each, a total of 45 teams, conflicting the previous announcement of 46 registered teams. No official statement has been issued about the exclusion of Ascoli 1898 FC.

The schedule for the 2024–25 season has been announced immediately following the groups, on 7 August 2024. The first matches are to played on 8 September 2024 and the last matchday concludes on 1 June 2025.

== Teams ==
Locations of teams in the 2024–25 Serie C Femminile:
Group A; Group B; Group C;
See cutout below for Lombardy-based teams.
Locations of the Lombardy-based teams in the 2024–25 Serie C Femminile.

=== Team changes ===
One of the group winners of the 2023–24 season, ASD Meran Women has been found ineligible by FIGC and has therefore not been promoted to Serie B. To replace Meran and Pomigliano FC, which has failed to register for Serie B following relegation from Serie A, Orobica Bergamo, the runner-up of 2023–24 Serie C group A, and Pavia Academy, the 14th-place finisher in the 2023–24 season of Serie B set for relegation, have been admitted to Serie B as replacement.

Several teams that qualified for Serie C in the 2024–25 season failed to register, namely:

- Cosenza SRL (Eccellenza Basilicata - Calabria);
- ASD Genova (Eccellenza Liguria);
- ASD Independent (9th place group C in 2023–24 season);
- ASD Orvieto FC (Eccellenza Umbria);
- ASD Padova (12th place group B in 2023–24 season);
- US Recanatese SRL (Eccellenza Marche);

Due to the resulting high number of vacancies, LND has admitted several additional teams to compete in 2024–25 Serie C:

- ASD Formello CR from Eccellenza Lazio;
- ASD Giovanile Rocca from Eccellenza Sicilia;
- ASD Venezia 1985;
- ASD Accademia Vittuone, which was set to be relegated from Serie C;

Ascoli 1898 FC should have been promoted to Serie C and has been included in the official roster of registered teams, however, Ascoli does not appear in any of the groups announced the following week.

Accademia Vittuone, who were supposed to retain their Serie C spot and appeared in the official group roster, were ultimately replaced with ASD FC Sedriano.

Entering league		Exiting league		
Promoted from 2023 to 2024 regional Eccellenza leagues	Relegated from 2023–24 Serie B	Promoted to 2024–25 Serie B	Relegated to 2024–25 regional Eccellenza leagues	Other
ASD Blues Pietrasanta; ASD Bulè Bellinzago; ASD Dolphins Agropoli; ASD Formello CR; ASD Gatteo Mare; ASD Giovanile Rocca; US Isera; FC Lesmo SSD; ASD Nitor; ASD Sassari Torres; ASD FC Sedriano; SSDARL Siracusa 1924; Real Vicenza	Ravenna FC; ASD UPC Tavagnacco	FC Lumezzane; Orobica Bergamo; Vis Mediterranea	ASD Apulia Trani; GS CF Caprera; ASD Condor Treviso; ASD Coscarello Castrolibero; FC Crotone; ASD Livorno; ASD Molfetta; AC Perugia; USD Rinascita Doccia; US Triestina 1918; ASD Accademia Vittuone	ASD Independent; L'Aquila 1927; ASD Meran Women; ASD Padova

== Groups ==
=== Group A ===
Pos	Team	Pld	W	D	L	GF	GA	GD	Pts	Promotion or relegation
1	ASD FC Sedriano	1	1	0	0	4	0	+4	3	Promotion to 2025–26 Serie B
2	Pro Sesto 1913	1	1	0	0	4	1	+3	3	
3	Azalee Solbiatese 1911	1	1	0	0	3	0	+3	3	
4	Real Meda	1	1	0	0	3	0	+3	3	
5	Tharros	1	1	0	0	3	0	+3	3	
6	Moncalieri 1953	1	1	0	0	2	1	+1	3	
7	Angelo Baiardo	1	1	0	0	1	0	+1	3	
8	Spezia	0	0	0	0	0	0	0	0	
9	Monterosso	1	0	0	1	1	2	−1	0	
10	FC Lesmo	1	0	0	1	0	1	−1	0	
11	Independiente Ivrea	1	0	0	1	1	4	−3	0	
12	Blues Pietrasanta	1	0	0	1	0	3	−3	0	
13	Bulè Bellinzago	1	0	0	1	0	3	−3	0	Relegation to 2025–26 regional Eccellenza leagues
14	Sassari Torres	1	0	0	1	0	3	−3	0	Relegation to 2025–26 regional Eccellenza leagues
15	Formello	1	0	0	1	0	4	−4	0	Relegation to 2025–26 regional Eccellenza leagues

Updated to match(es) played on 8 September 2024. Source:
Rules for classification: Tiebreakers

==== Results ====
Home \ Away	ANG	AZA	BLU	BUL	FOR	IVR	LES	MED	MOC	MOR	PRO	SED	SPE	THA	TOR
Angelo Baiardo															
Azalee Solbiatese 1911				3–0											
Blues Pietrasanta															
Bulè Bellinzago															
Formello												0–4			
Independiente Ivrea															
FC Lesmo	0–1														
Real Meda			3–0												
Moncalieri 1953										2–1					
Monterosso															
Pro Sesto 1913						4–1									
ASD FC Sedriano															
Spezia															
Tharros															
Sassari Torres														0–3	

Updated to match(es) played on 8 September 2024. Source:
Legend: Blue = home team win; Yellow = draw; Red = away team win.

=== Group B ===
Pos	Team	Pld	W	D	L	GF	GA	GD	Pts	Promotion or relegation
1	Venezia FC	1	1	0	0	5	0	+5	3	Promotion to 2025–26 Serie B
2	LF Jesina	1	1	0	0	4	0	+4	3	
3	Villorba	1	1	0	0	4	0	+4	3	
4	FC Südtirol	1	1	0	0	3	1	+2	3	
5	Trento	1	1	0	0	2	0	+2	3	
6	Vicenza CF	1	1	0	0	1	0	+1	3	
7	Chieti	1	0	1	0	2	2	0	1	
8	US Isera	1	0	1	0	2	2	0	1	
9	Venezia 1985	0	0	0	0	0	0	0	0	
10	UPC Tavagnacco	1	0	0	1	0	1	−1	0	
11	Real Vicenza	1	0	0	1	1	3	−2	0	
12	Accademia SPAL	1	0	0	1	0	2	−2	0	
13	Ravenna FC	1	0	0	1	0	4	−4	0	Relegation to 2025–26 regional Eccellenza leagues
14	Riccione	1	0	0	1	0	4	−4	0	Relegation to 2025–26 regional Eccellenza leagues
15	Gatteo Mare	1	0	0	1	0	5	−5	0	Relegation to 2025–26 regional Eccellenza leagues

Updated to match(es) played on 8 September 2024. Source:
Rules for classification: Tiebreakers

==== Results ====
Home \ Away	CHI	GAT	ISE	JES	RAV	RIC	SPA	SÜD	TAV	TRE	VE1	VEF	VIC	VIR	VIL
Chieti			2–2												
Gatteo Mare												0–5			
US Isera															
LF Jesina					4–0										
Ravenna FC															
Riccione															0–4
Accademia SPAL										0–2					
FC Südtirol														3–1	
UPC Tavagnacco															
Trento															
Venezia 1985															
Venezia FC															
Vicenza CF									1–0						
Real Vicenza															
Villorba															

Updated to match(es) played on 8 September 2024. Source:
Legend: Blue = home team win; Yellow = draw; Red = away team win.

=== Group C ===
Pos	Team	Pld	W	D	L	GF	GA	GD	Pts	Promotion or relegation
1	Roma CF	1	1	0	0	6	1	+5	3	Promotion to 2025–26 Serie B
2	Palermo FC	1	1	0	0	5	1	+4	3	
3	Catania FC	1	1	0	0	4	0	+4	3	
4	Trastevere	1	1	0	0	4	1	+3	3	
5	Grifone Gialloverde	1	1	0	0	4	2	+2	3	
6	Matera Città Sassi	1	1	0	0	3	2	+1	3	
7	Dolphins Agropoli	1	0	1	0	1	1	0	1	
8	Frosinone	1	0	1	0	1	1	0	1	
9	Lecce	0	0	0	0	0	0	0	0	
10	PD Montespaccato	1	0	0	1	2	3	−1	0	
11	US Salernitana 1919	1	0	0	1	2	4	−2	0	
12	Villaricca	1	0	0	1	1	4	−3	0	
13	Giovanile Rocca	1	0	0	1	1	5	−4	0	Relegation to 2025–26 regional Eccellenza leagues
14	Siracusa 1924	1	0	0	1	0	4	−4	0	Relegation to 2025–26 regional Eccellenza leagues
15	Nitor	1	0	0	1	1	6	−5	0	Relegation to 2025–26 regional Eccellenza leagues

Updated to match(es) played on 8 September 2024. Source:
Rules for classification: Tiebreakers

==== Results ====
Home \ Away	CAT	DOL	FRO	GIO	GRI	LEC	MAT	MON	NIT	PAL	ROM	SAL	SIR	TRA	VIL
Catania FC													4–0		
Dolphins Agropoli			1–1												
Frosinone															
Giovanile Rocca															
Grifone Gialloverde												4–2			
Lecce															
Matera Città Sassi								3–2							
PD Montespaccato															
Nitor											1–6				
Palermo FC				5–1											
Roma CF															
US Salernitana 1919															
Siracusa 1924															
Trastevere															
Villaricca														1–4	

Updated to match(es) played on 8 September 2024. Source:
Legend: Blue = home team win; Yellow = draw; Red = away team win.
