= Giada Abate =

Italian footballer

Personal information
- Full name: Giada Abate
- Date of birth: 6 March 2003 (age 23)
- Place of birth: Genoa, Italy
- Position: Midfielder

Team information
- Current team: Genoa
- Number: 5

Youth career
- 2014–2019: Genoa

Senior career*
Years	Team	Apps	(Gls)
2019–	Genoa	95	(6)

International career^{‡}
2018–2019	Italy U16	15	(1)
2019	Italy U17	5	(0)
- * Club domestic league appearances and goals ‡ National team caps and goals as of 21 May 2026

Giada Abate (born 6 March 2003) is an Italian footballer who plays as a midfielder for and captains Serie A Women club Genoa.

== Club career ==
Abate has been playing for Genoa since the creation of the senior women's football team in 2019. She was always the captain.

In 2019/20, Genoa played in Serie D because they didn't sign up for the Italian Serie C. Here Genoa won 10 matches out of 10 before the tournament was stopped due to the COVID-19 pandemic and they were automatically promoted, without having played the 4 remaining matches.

In the 2020/21 and 2021/22 season, Giada played in Serie C, making 52 appearances and scoring 5 goals, then Genoa acquired the sporting title of the women's Serie B team Cortefranca in the summer of 2022 and obtained with it the right to register for Serie B 2022/23, where Giada played in 20 matches from October 2022 until March 2023. On 12 March 2023, in a game against Lazio, Giada got a cruciate ligament injury.

She didn't play for 371 days, until her comeback on 17 March 2024 when she came off the bench in a 4-1 win over Tavagnacco.

On May 16, 2026, she made her Serie A debut coming off the bench, during the last Genoa's match of the first historic Serie A season (Rome-Genoa 2-0). In this way, she became, together with Sara Lucafò, the only player in Genoa's history — across both the men's and women's teams — to have played in four different levels of Italian football: Eccellenza, Serie C, Serie B and Serie A.

== International career ==
Giada has represented Italy in all youth levels. In 2018, she played her first 9 friendly matches with the U16s (four of them at "Torneo delle Nazioni" in Friuli-Venezia Giulia, where Italy finished 4th) and in 2019 she made 6 more appearances for them (four of them at "Torneo delle Nazioni", where Giada became captain against Macedonia and scored her only goal with the national team).

In summer 2019, Abate played for the U17s, debuting in two friendly matches against Serbia and then playing in three more matches at the 2020 UEFA Women's Under-17 Championship qualification, before it was cancelled due to the COVID-19 pandemic.

== Career statistics ==
As of 21 May 2026

Appearances and goals by club, season and competition
Club	Season	League			National cup (Note: Includes Coppa Italia, Coppa Italia Serie C and Coppa Italia Eccellenza)		League cup (Note: Serie A Women's Cup)		Total	
Club	Season	Division	Apps	Goals	Apps	Goals	Apps	Goals	Apps	Goals
Genoa	2019–20	Eccellenza	9	1	3	1	—		12	2
Genoa	2020–21	Serie C	22	2	2	1	—		24	3
Genoa	2021–22	Serie C	30	2	3	0	—		33	2
Genoa	2022–23	Serie B	20	0	2	1	—		22	1
Genoa	2023–24	Serie B	5	0	0	0	—		5	0
Genoa	2024–25	Serie B	8	1	0	0	—		8	1
Genoa	2025–26	Serie A	1	0	0	0	0	0	1	0
Career total			95	6	10	3	0	0	105	9
