= Giorgia Bettalli =

Italian footballer

Personal information
- Date of birth: 16 July 1998 (age 28)
- Position: Midfielder

Team information
- Current team: Sampdoria
- Number: 4

Youth career
- 2012–2016: Ligorna

Senior career*
Years	Team	Apps	(Gls)
2016–2018	Ligorna	49	(9)
2018–2021	Campomorone Lady	57	(11)
2021–2026	Genoa CFC Women	118	(21)
2026–	Sampdoria	0	(0)
- * Club domestic league appearances and goals as of 21 August 2026

Giorgia Bettalli (born 16 July 1998) is an Italian footballer who plays as a midfielder for Sampdoria.

== Club career ==
Giorgia Bettalli grew up playing football in Ligorna, where she won the national Youth title in 2016. She then played two seasons in Serie B for the same team (making 49 caps and 9 goals) until she moved to Campomorone Lady, in Serie C, where she remained three years (2018-2021). Mostly playing as starting player, she totalled only 57 appearances due to the suspension of the championship caused by the COVID-19 pandemic.

In the summer of 2021 she signed for Genoa and came back in Serie B.

On 11 May 2025, she scored the crucial goal in a 1–0 victory against Orobica. This secured Genoa's first ever promotion to Serie A, thanks to Bologna's simultaneous loss.

On 18 October 2025, she made her Serie A debut coming off the bench, during the first historical Genoa's victory in Serie A, against Ternana (3–1).
