= Federica Di Criscio =

Italian footballer (born 1993)

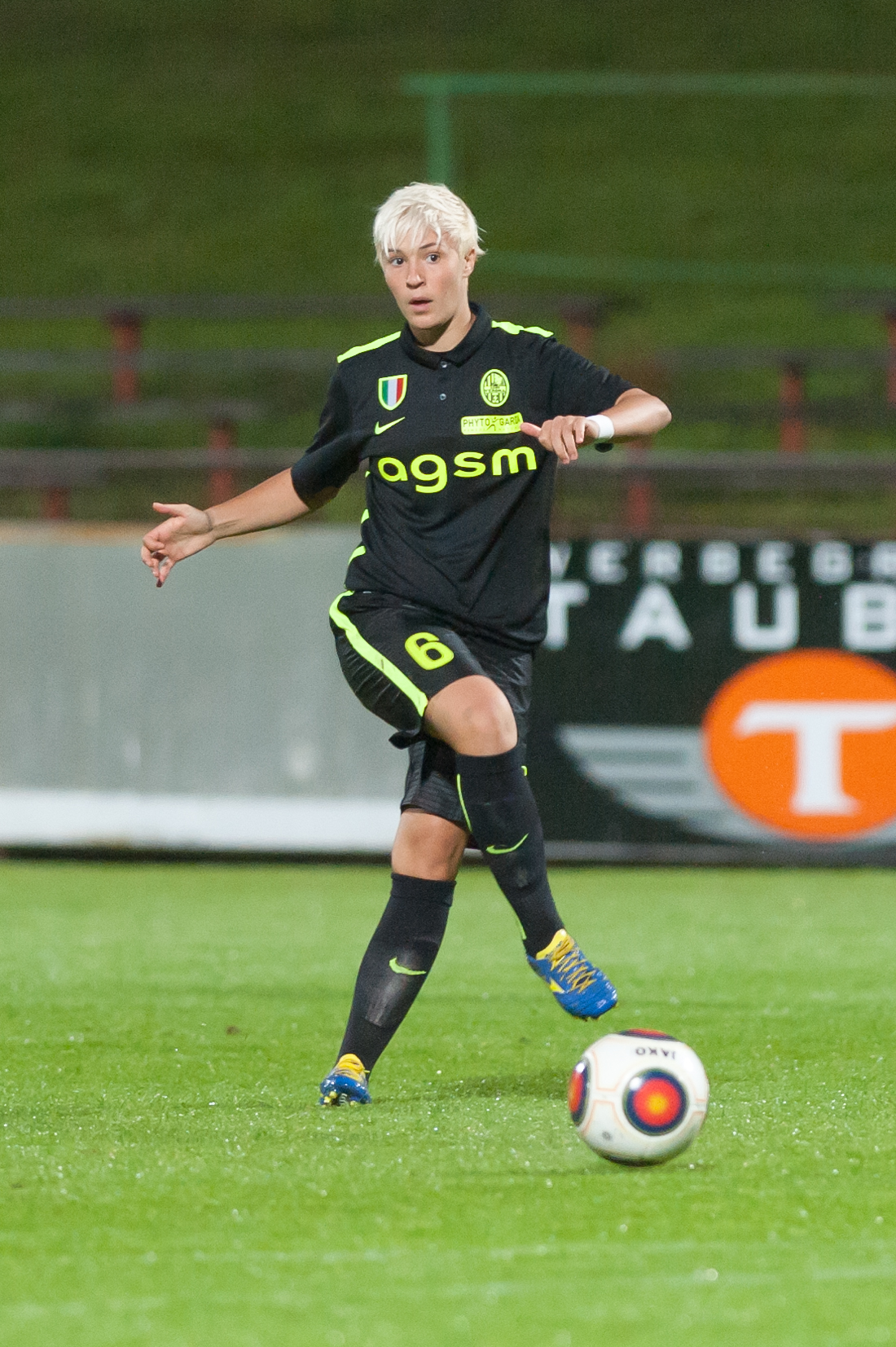
- Federica Di Criscio 2015

Personal information
- Full name: Federica Di Criscio
- Date of birth: 12 May 1993 (age 33)
- Place of birth: Lanciano, Italy
- Height: 1.68 m (5 ft 6 in)
- Positions: Centre back; defensive midfielder

Team information
- Current team: Genoa CFC
- Number: 15

Senior career*
Years	Team	Apps	(Gls)
2009–2010	Cervia	19	(3)
2010–2017	AGSM Verona	165	(17)
2017–2018	Brescia	19	(1)
2018–2020	Roma	22	(2)
2020	Napoli	8	(0)
2021	Avaldsnes IL	0	(0)
2021–2022	Pink Bari		
2022–2024	Ternana	60	(5)
2024–	Genoa		

International career^{‡}
2013-	Italy	10	(0)
- * Club domestic league appearances and goals as of 20 November 2018 ‡ National team caps and goals as of 1 December 2019 (UTC)

Federica Di Criscio (born 12 May 1993) is an Italian football defender or midfielder who plays for Serie B club Genoa. She featured for the senior Italy women's national football team at UEFA Women's Euro 2013.

== International career ==
National coach Antonio Cabrini omitted Di Criscio from his selection for UEFA Women's Euro 2013, but called her into the squad when Elisabetta Tona was injured on the eve of the tournament.

Di Criscio made her first major tournament appearance when playing the last 21 minutes of Italy's quarter-final defeat to Germany.

Di Criscio was called up to the Italy squad for the UEFA Women's Euro 2017.
