= Eleonora Cecchini =

Sammarinese footballer (born 2003)

Personal information
- Date of birth: 27 September 2003 (age 23)
- Place of birth: San Marino, San Marino
- Height: 5 ft 5 in (1.65 m)
- Position: Midfielder

Youth career
- San Marino

College career
Years	Team	Apps	(Gls)
2022–2025	D'Youville Saints	51	(4)

Senior career*
Years	Team	Apps	(Gls)
2018–2022	San Marino		
2023	St. Catharines Roma Wolves	5	(0)
- * Club domestic league appearances and goals as of 10 September 2023

Eleonora Cecchini (born 27 September 2003) is a Sammarinese footballer.

== Early life ==
Cecchini played youth football with the San Marino Academy.

== College career ==
In March 2022, she began committed to attend D'Youville University in the United States, where she played for the women's soccer team. On 5 September 2022, she scored her first collegiate goal against the Bluefield State Big Blue. After scoring in her next match as well, she was named the East Coast Conference Rookie of the Week. She led the team in scoring that season with four goals. At the end of her freshman season, she was named to the ECC All-Conference Second Team and the USCAA Second Team All-American.

== Club career ==
In December 2018, she debuted for the San Marino Academy first team in a match against Pontedera in the Serie C. On 5 May 2021, she made her Serie A debut. She remained with the squad for the 2021–22 season in the Serie B. On 10 March 2022, she scored her first professional goal against Roma CF.

In 2023, she played with Canadian club St. Catharines Roma Wolves in League1 Ontario.

== International career ==
As San Marino does not have a women's team program, in January 2018, she attended a training camp with the Italian U15 team. She was called up to another camp in July.
