= Martina Di Bari =

Italian footballer (born 2002)

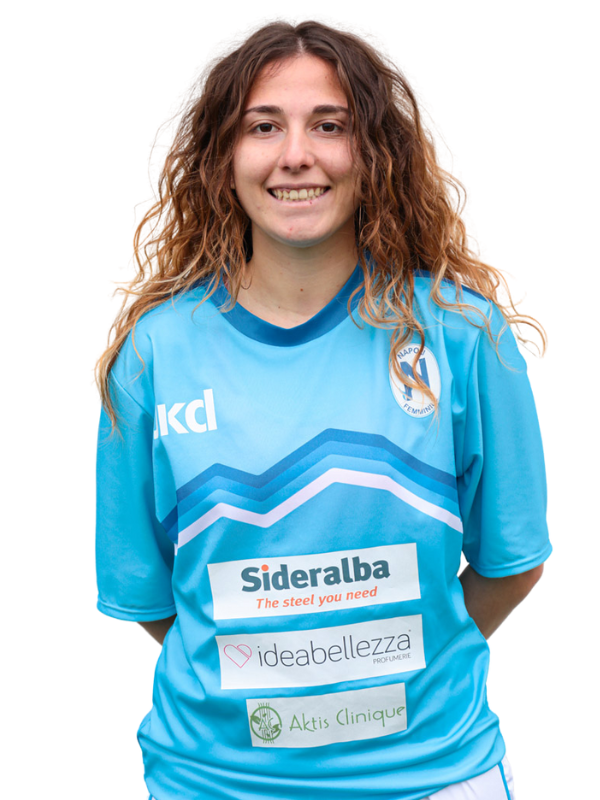

Personal information
- Date of birth: 5 June 2002 (age 24)
- Place of birth: Bari, Italy
- Position: Centre-back

Team information
- Current team: Genoa
- Number: 3

Senior career*
Years	Team	Apps	(Gls)
2016–2022	Pink Sport Time	65	(4)
2022–2024	Roma	0	(0)
2022–2024	→ Napoli	21	(0)
2024–	Genoa	24	(1)
- * Club domestic league appearances and goals as of 1 November 2025 ‡ National team caps and goals as of 1 November 2025

Martina Di Bari (born 5 June 2002) is an Italian footballer, who plays as a centre-back for Genoa.
