= Martina Scuratti =

Italian footballer

Personal information
- Full name: Martina Scuratti
- Date of birth: 24 June 2002 (age 24)
- Height: 1.70 m (5 ft 7 in)
- Position: Midfielder

Youth career
- 20??-2017: Fiammamonza
- 2017–2020: Inter

Senior career*
Years	Team	Apps	(Gls)
2018–2019	Inter	1	(0)
2020–2022	Pro Sesto Women	38	(3)
2022–2023	ChievoVerona FM	24	(2)
2023–2024	Genoa CFC Women	29	(1)
2024	Bologna	0	(0)
- * Club domestic league appearances and goals as of 13 November 2024 ‡ National team caps and goals as of 13 November 2024

Martina Scuratti (born 24 June 2002) is an Italian footballer who plays as a midfielder.

== Club career ==
Martina Scuratti grew up as a footballer in Fiammamonza Youth since she was a child, then she arrives at Inter F.C. in 2017 and got to play with the Youth team, where she won the national Youth title in 2019.

On 10 February 2019 Scuratti debuted in Serie B during the match Cittadella-Inter 0–1, coming on at 91'.

In summer 2020 she moves to Pro Sesto, playing 12 matches in Serie C and scoring a goal. The team gets promoted to the upper division, the Serie B, where Scuratti plays 26 matches and scores 2 goals during the season 2021–2022.

In 2022–2023 Martina Scuratti plays for ChievoVerona Women, always in Serie B, doing 24 appearances and scoring 2 goals.

In 2023's summer she becomes a new Genoa's football player.

After 29 caps e 1 goal with Genoa, she moves to Bologna.
