= Sharon Corrales =

Costa Rican footballer

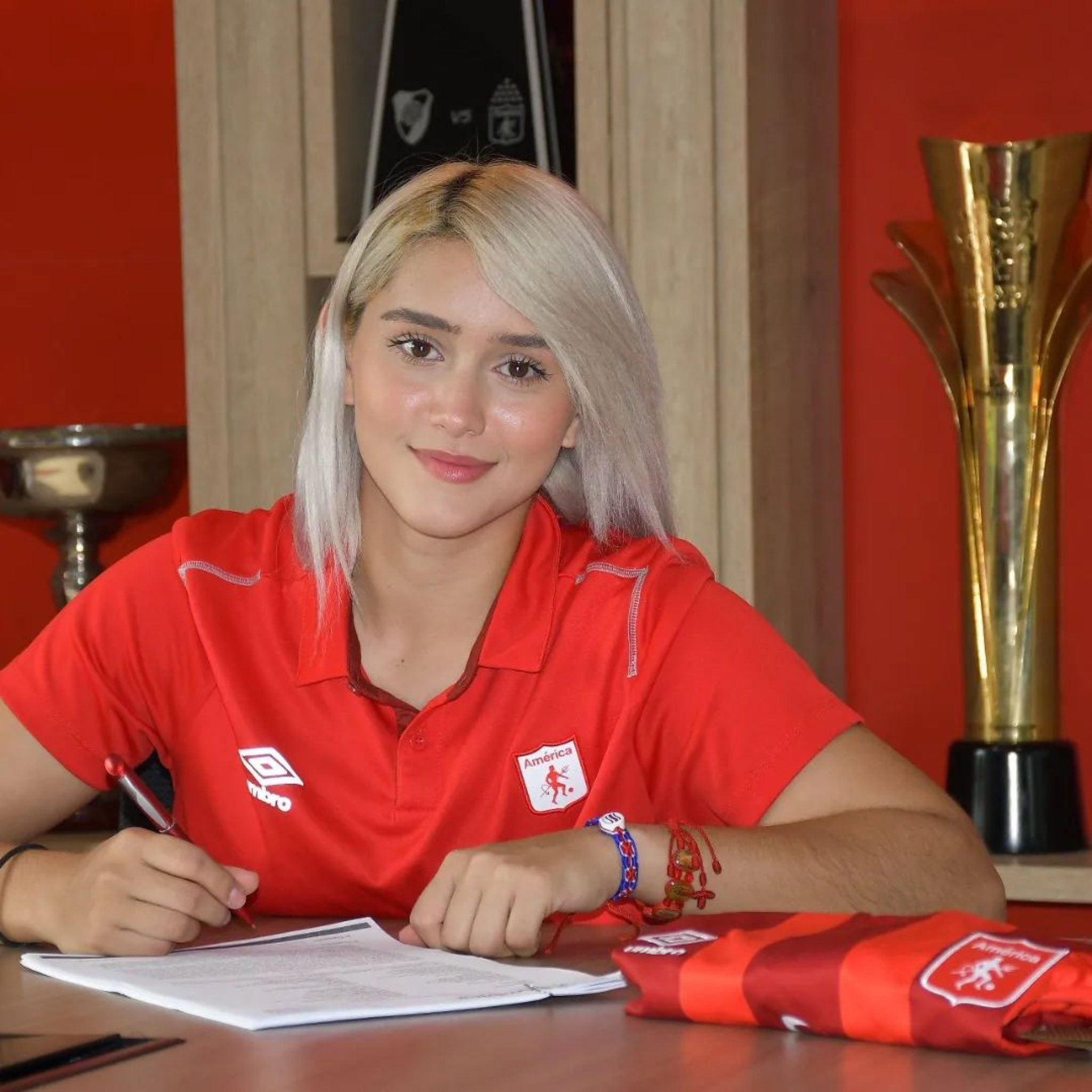

Personal information
- Full name: Sharon Nicole Corrales Rodríguez
- Date of birth: 31 October 2002 (age 24)
- Place of birth: Costa Rica
- Height: 5 ft 7 in (1.70 m)
- Position: Goalkeeper

Team information
- Current team: A.S.D. Matera Women

Senior career*
Years	Team	Apps	(Gls)
2019	Codea LDA		
2020	Carmelita		
2021	Alajuelense		
2021	Atletico Chiriqui W		
2022	America de Cali		
2023	Llaneros F.C.		
2024-Current	A.S.D. Matera Women		
- * Club domestic league appearances and goals

Sharon Nicole Corrales Rodríguez (born 31 October 2002) is a Costa Rican footballer who currently plays as goalkeeper for A.S.D Matera Women in Italy's Serie C.

== Club career ==
=== Codea LDA ===
On the 2nd of June, 2019 she made her professional senior team debut against Liberia. That match would end 1–9 in favor of Codea LDA.

=== A.D. Carmelita ===
On February 11th of 2020, she signed with A.D Carmelita, on loan from L.D. Alajuelese (formerly Codea LDA) to Costa Rica's second division. Due the pandemic caused by COVID-19 the apertura tournament of 2020 was cancelled for all divisions and she didn't debut with the club.

=== L.D. Alajuelense ===
Coming in as a free agent, on January 15th, 2021, she signed a 1-year contract with L.D. Alajuelese making her return to Costa Rica's first division. While she only played for 6 months of her contract, During that time she was champion of the apertura tournament of 2021.

=== Atletico Chiriqui W ===
On August 24th of 2021, Atletico Chiriqui W officially announce her arrival to the club and the Panamas First Division. Helping her team make it to the semifinals, there she would end up as goalkeeper with least goals conceded in the tournament with 4 goals in 8 matches played. She was also included in the Best XI of the Panamanian Women's league for that tournament of that year.

=== America de Cali ===
On January 11th of 2022, América de Cali confirmed on social media the signing of Sharon Corrales on a 1-year deal. Here she would play in several important matches, including a dominant 4–0 victory against rival club Deportivo Cali, helping her team win the championship of the women's Colombian league that year. She also took part in the women's Copa Libertadores that year in Ecuador, where her team managed to win 3rd place. Sharon also played an important role later that year where she helped her team win the women's Copa Telepacifica.

=== Llaneros F.C. ===
On March 4th 2023, Llaneros F.C. announced the signing of Sharon Corrales on a short team contract on her return to the Colombian league.

=== A.S.D. Matera Women ===
On April 11th 2024 her signing to A.S.D. Matera Women, who plays in Italy's female Serie C was made official thus marking her entry to football in Europe. Only 3 days later on April 14th 2024, she made her club debut with a victory against club Villaricca Calcio W with a score of 3–1.
