= Italian women's football clubs in international competitions =

This is a compilation of the results of the teams representing Italy at official international women's football competitions, that is the UEFA Women's Cup and its successor, the UEFA Women's Champions League. Italian women's football clubs have entered European association football competitions since the first edition of the UEFA Women's Cup in 2001-02, when Torres was eliminated in the group stage.

As of the 2021-22 season Italy stands 5th in the competition's association rankings and is thus granted two spots in the competition. Its major success to date is Verona's appearance in the 2007-08 semifinals.

== Teams ==
These are the eleven teams that have represented Italy in the UEFA Women's Cup and the UEFA Women's Champions League.

Club	Founded	Region	Location	Appearances	First	Last	Best result
Brescia	1995	Lombardy	Brescia	4	2014-15	2017-18	4 / 7 - Quarterfinals
Fiammamonza	1966	Lombardy	Monza	1	2005-06	2005-06	6 / 7 - Last 32
Fiorentina	2015	Tuscany	Florence	4	2017-18	2020-21	Last 16
Foroni	1989	Veneto	Verona	1	2003-04	2003-04	6 / 7 - Last 32
Lazio	1969	Lazio	Rome	1	2002-03	2002-03	6 / 7 - Last 32
Tavagnacco	1989	Friuli-Venezia Giulia	Tavagnacco	2	2011-12	2013-14	6 / 7 - Last 32
Torres	1980	Sardinia	Sassari	8	2001-02	2014-15	4 / 7 - Quarterfinals
Verona	1995	Veneto	Verona	8	2005-06	2016-17	3 / 7 - Semifinals
Juventus	2017	Piedmont	Turin	5	2018-19	2022-23	Quarterfinals
Milan	2018	Lombardy	Milan	1	2021-22	2021-22	Round 1
Roma	2018	Lazio	Rome	1	2022-23	2022-23	Quarterfinals

Location of the teams within Italy

== Consecutive seasons in European competitions ==
Teams in bold: active streak. Only the best result of each teams is shown

Rank	Club	Consecutive seasons	Years
1	Torres	6	From 2009-10 to 2014-15
2	**Juventus**	5	From 2018-19 to 2022-23
3	Verona	4	From 2007-08 to 2010-11
3	Fiorentina	4	From 2017-18 to 2020-21
3	Brescia	4	From 2014-15 to 2017-18

== Historical progression ==
		2001–02	2002–03	2003–04	2004–05	2005–06	2006–07	2007–08	2008–09	2009–10
Champion										
Finalists										
Semifinalists								VER		
Quarterfinalists					TOR			VER	VER	TOR
Round of 16					TOR			VER	VER	TOR
Round of 32		TOR	LAZ	FOR		VER	FIA	VER		TOR - VER
Earlier stages										TOR
	2010–11	2011–12	2012–13	2013–14	2014–15	2015–16	2016–17			
Champion										
Finalists										
Semifinalists										
Quarterfinalists			TOR	TOR		BRE				
Round of 16	TOR	TOR	TOR	TOR	TOR	BRE - VER	BRE			
Round of 32	TOR - VER	TOR - TAV	TOR - VER	TOR - TAV	TOR - BRE	BRE - VER	BRE - VER			
Earlier stages	VER									

== Results by team ==
=== Brescia ===
2014–15 UEFA Women's Champions League
Round	Opponent	1st	2nd	Agg.	Scorers
Last 36 (group stage)	(France) Olympique Lyonnais	h: 0–5	a: 0–9	**0–14**	

2015–16 UEFA Women's Champions League
Round	Opponent	1st	2nd	Agg.	Scorers
Round of 32	(England) Liverpool	h: 1–0	a: 1–0	**2–0**	Bonansea - Gama
Round of 16	(Denmark) Fortuna Hjørring	h: 1–0	a: 1–1	**2–1**	Boattin - Sabatino
Quarterfinals	(Germany) Wolfsburg	a: 0–3	h: 0–3	**0–6**	

2016–17 UEFA Women's Champions League
Round	Opponent	1st	2nd	Agg.	Scorers
Round of 32	(Poland) Medyk Konin	a: 3–4	h: 3–2	**6–6** (agr)	Sabatino 2 - Bonansea - Cernoia - Girelli
Round of 16	(Denmark) Fortuna Hjørring	h: 0–1	a: 1–3	**1–4**	Manieri

2017–18 UEFA Women's Champions League
Round	Opponent	1st	2nd	Agg.	Scorers
Round of 32	(Netherlands) Ajax	a: 0–1			

=== Fiammamonza ===
2005–06 UEFA Women's Cup
Round	Opponent	1st	2nd	Agg.	Scorers
Last 36 (group stage)	(Bosnia and Herzegovina) Sarajevo	1–0			Gazzoli
Last 36 (group stage)	(Belarus) Universitet Vitebsk	0–1			
Last 36 (group stage)	(Lithuania) Gintra Universitetas (host)	3–0		**6 points**	Ramera 2 - Balconi

=== Fiorentina ===
2017–18 UEFA Women's Champions League
Round	Opponent	1st	2nd	Agg.	Scorers
Round of 32	(Denmark) Fortuna Hjørring	h: 2–1			Mauro – Vigilucci

=== Foroni ===
2003–04 UEFA Women's Cup
Round	Opponent	1st	2nd	Agg.	Scorers
Last 32 (group stage)	(Croatia) Osijek	10–0			Gazzoli 6 - Camporese - Placchi - Tagliacarne
Last 32 (group stage)	(Russia) Energiya Voronezh (host)	0–0			
Last 32 (group stage)	(Hungary) Femina Budapest	4–0		**7 points**	Gazzoli 4

=== Lazio ===
2002–03 UEFA Women's Cup
Round	Opponent	1st	2nd	Agg.	Scorers
Last 32 (group stage)	(Israel) Maccabi Haifa	5–0			Marsico 2 - Frollani - Panico - Zorri
Last 32 (group stage)	(France) Toulouse	1–1			Lattanzi
Last 32 (group stage)	(Hungary) Femina Budapest	5–2		**7 points**	Panico 3 - Zorri - Marsico

=== Tavagnacco ===
2011–12 UEFA Women's Champions League
Round	Opponent	1st	2nd	Agg.	Scorers
Round of 32	(Sweden) Malmö	h: 2–1	a: 0–5	**2–6**	Camporese - Riboldi

2013–14 UEFA Women's Champions League
Round	Opponent	1st	2nd	Agg.	Scorers
Round of 32	(Denmark) Fortuna Hjørring	h: 3–2	a: 0–2	**3–4**	Camporese - Tuttino - Zuliani

=== Torres ===
2001–02 UEFA Women's Cup
Round	Opponent	1st	2nd	Agg.	Scorers
Last 32 (group stage)	(Finland) HJK (host)	1–2			Parejo
Last 32 (group stage)	(Austria) Landhaus	5–0			Conti 2 - Parejo 2 - Masia
Last 32 (group stage)	(Faroe Islands) KÍ	4–0		**6 points**	Sberti 3 - Parejo

2004–05 UEFA Women's Cup
Round	Opponent	1st	2nd	Agg.	Scorers
Last 16 (group stage)	(Poland) Wroclaw	5–0			Gazzoli 2 - Pedersen 2 - Tona
Last 16 (group stage)	(France) Montpellier	2–1			Conti - Gazzoli
Last 16 (group stage)	(Germany) Turbine Potsdam (host)	5–7		**6 points**	Pedersen 2 - Gazzoli - Guarino - Pintus
Quarterfinals	(England) Arsenal	h: 2–0	a: 1–4	**3–4**	Conti - Guarino - Pedersen

2009–10 UEFA Women's Champions League
Round	Opponent	1st	2nd	Agg.	Scorers
Qualifiers (group stage)	(Slovakia) Slovan Duslo Šaľa	1–0			
Qualifiers (group stage)	(Turkey) Trabzonspor	9–0			
Qualifiers (group stage)	(Slovenia) Krka (host)	3–0		**9 points**	
Round of 32	(Iceland) Valur	h: 4–1	a: 2–1	**6–2**	Panico 2 - Iannella - Manieri - Stracchi - Tona
Round of 16	(Austria) Neulengbach	a: 4–1	h: 4–1	**8–2**	Iannella 3 - Fuselli 2 - Manieri - Stracchi - Tona
Quarterfinals	(France) Olympique Lyonnais	a: 0–3	h: 1–0	**1–3**	

2010–11 UEFA Women's Champions League
Round	Opponent	1st	2nd	Agg.	Scorers
Round of 32	(Switzerland) Zürich	a: 3–2	h: 4–1	**7–3**	Camporese 4 - Fuselli 2 - Domenichetti
Round of 16	(France) Juvisy	h: 1–2	a: 2–2	**3–4**	Fuselli - Iannella - Pintus

2011–12 UEFA Women's Champions League
Round	Opponent	1st	2nd	Agg.	Scorers
Round of 32	(Israel) ASA	a: 3–2	h: 2–0	**5–2**	Panico 2 - Mändly - Maglia
Round of 16	(Denmark) Brøndby	a: 1–2	h: 1–3	**2–5**	Fuselli - Iannella

2012–13 UEFA Women's Champions League
Round	Opponent	1st	2nd	Agg.	Scorers
Round of 32	(Cyprus) Apollon Limassol	a: 3–2	h: 3–1	**6–2**	Panico 3 - Fuselli - Iannella - Manieri
Round of 16	(Romania) Olimpia Cluj	h: 4–1	a: 3–0	**7–1**	Panico 5 - Domenichetti - Iannella
Quarterfinals	(England) Arsenal	a: 1–3	h: 0–1	**1–4**	Mändly

2013–14 UEFA Women's Champions League
Round	Opponent	1st	2nd	Agg.	Scorers
Round of 32	(Austria) Spratzern	a: 2–2	h: 3–1	**5–3**	Fuselli - Iannella - Mändly - Marchese - Panico
Round of 16	(Russia) Rossiyanka	a: 0–1	h: 2–0	**2–1**	Conti - Panico
Quarterfinals	(Germany) Turbine Potsdam	h: 0–8	a: 1–4	**1–12**	Domenichetti

2014–15 UEFA Women's Champions League
Round	Opponent	1st	2nd	Agg.	Scorers
Round of 32	(Slovenia) Pomurje	a: 4–2	h: 3–1	**7–3**	Flaviano 2 - Domenichetti - Maglia - Pinna - Serrano - Tona
Round of 16	(Germany) Frankfurt	a: 0–5	h: 0–4	**0–9**	

=== Verona ===
2005–06 UEFA Women's Cup
Round	Opponent	1st	2nd	Agg.	Scorers
Last 36 (group stage)	(Croatia) Dinamo Maksimir (host)	3–0			Brumana 2 - Boni
Last 36 (group stage)	(Republic of Ireland) University College Dublin	2–0			Brumana - Ficarelli
Last 36 (group stage)	(Austria) Neulengbach	0–0		**7 points**	

2007–08 UEFA Women's Cup
Round	Opponent	1st	2nd	Agg.	Scorers
Last 40 (group stage)	(Malta) Birkirkara	16–0			Boni 3 - Gabbiadini 3 -Panico 3 - Tuttino 2 - Vicchiarello 2 - Girelli - Motta
Last 40 (group stage)	(Slovenia) Krka (host)	5–0			Panico 2 - Boni - Tuttino - Vicchiarello
Last 40 (group stage)	(Spain) Athletic Bilbao	1–0		**9 points**	Gabbiadini
Last 16 (group stage)	(Austria) Neulengbach	3–2			Boni - Panico - Tuttino
Last 16 (group stage)	(Kazakhstan) Alma	5–1			Panico 2 - Boni - Gabbiadini - Manieri
Last 16 (group stage)	(England) Arsenal	3–3		**7 points**	Manieri 2 - Gabbiadini
Quarterfinals	(Denmark) Brøndby	h: 0–1	a: 1–0 (aet)	**1–1** (p: 3–2)	Tuttino
Semifinals	(Germany) Frankfurt	a: 2–4	h: 0–3	**2–7**	Gabbiadini - Motta

2008–09 UEFA Women's Cup
Round	Opponent	1st	2nd	Agg.	Scorers
Last 16 (group stage)	(Kazakhstan) Alma	2–1			
Last 16 (group stage)	(Iceland) Valur	3–2			
Last 16 (group stage)	(Sweden) Umeå (host)	0–4		**6 points**	
Quarterfinals	(France) Olympique Lyonnais	h: 0–5	a: 1–4	**1–9**	Boni

2009–10 UEFA Women's Champions League
Round	Opponent	1st	2nd	Agg.	Scorers
Round of 32	(Denmark) Fortuna Hjørring	a: 0–4	h: 2–1	**2–5**	Paliotti - Villar

2010–11 UEFA Women's Champions League
Round	Opponent	1st	2nd	Agg.	Scorers
Qualifiers (group stage)	(Wales) Swansea City	7–0			Gabbiadini 3 - Tuttino 2 - Di Criscio
Qualifiers (group stage)	(Georgia (country)) Baia Zugdidi	3–0			Cantoro - Girelli - Gabbiadini
Qualifiers (group stage)	(Slovenia) Krka (host)	4–1		**9 points**	Di Criscio - Gabbiadini - Girelli - Tuttino
Round of 32	(Denmark) Fortuna Hjørring	a: 0–8	h: 1–6	**1–14**	Girelli

2012–13 UEFA Women's Champions League
Round	Opponent	1st	2nd	Agg.	Scorers
Round of 32	(England) Birmingham City	a: 0–2	h: 3–0 (aet)	**3–2**	Girelli 3
Round of 16	(Sweden) Malmö	a: 0–1	h: 0–2	**0–3**	

2015–16 UEFA Women's Champions League
Round	Opponent	1st	2nd	Agg.	Scorers
Round of 32	(Austria) St. Pölten-Spratzern	a: 5–4	h: 2–2	**7–6**	Gabbiadini 3 - Pirone 2 - Bonetti - Larsen
Round of 16	(Sweden) Rosengård	h: 1–3	a: 1–5	**2–8**	Gabbiadini - Pirone

2016–17 UEFA Women's Champions League
Round	Opponent	1st	2nd	Agg.	Scorers
Round of 32	(Kazakhstan) Kazygurt	a: 1–3	h: 1–1	**2–4**	Gabbiadini 2
