= Tecla Pettenuzzo =

Italian footballer (born 1999)

- Pettenuzzo with Napoli in 2024.

Personal information
- Date of birth: 30 November 1999 (age 26)
- Place of birth: Vicenza, Italy
- Height: 1.67 m (5 ft 6 in)
- Position: Defender

Team information
- Current team: Napoli
- Number: 6

Senior career*
Years	Team	Apps	(Gls)
?-2015	Due Monti		
2015–2017	Padova	26	(0)
2017–2018	Brescia	13	(1)
2018–2019	Sassuolo	22	(1)
2019–	Roma	36	(0)
2022–2023	→ Sampdoria (loan)	19	(1)
2023–	Napoli	71	(0)

International career
2015	Italy U17		
2016–2018	Italy U19	3	(0)
2021–	Italy	1	(0)
- * Club domestic league appearances and goals as of 17 May 2026

Tecla Pettenuzzo (born 30 November 1999) is an Italian professional footballer who plays as a defender for Serie A club Napoli. She previously played for AS Roma, US Sassuolo and Brescia, among other clubs.

== Club career ==
Pettenuzzo began her youth career in inter-gender training matches before finding her first women's team by joining the Montegalda-based football club Due Monti in time for the 2014–15 Serie B season. Pettenuzzo's first season with Due Monti was not a successful one, as the club were relegated to Serie C in 2015.

Pettenuzzo's performances were enough to earn a move to Serie B club Padova for the 2015–16 season. The Italian defender would remain with Padova for two seasons, achieving a fourth and third-placed finish in Serie B respectively. By the end of Pettenuzzo's second season with Padova, she gained the attention of the country's most successful women's football club Brescia.

Brescia would sign Pettenuzzo on a loan deal in the summer of 2017 and launch her career in Italy's top division. Pettenuzzo was immediately called up to the Brescia squad for their Supercoppa 2017 game against Fiorentina, which Brescia would win 4–1 on the day. Pettenuzzo came off the substitutes bench in the final minute of Brescia's Supercoppa win, earning herself a winner's medal with the club. Pettenuzzo would also make her UEFA Champions League debut with Brescia on 11 October 2017 against Ajax. It was a match Brescia won 2–0 on their way to securing passage through to the Round of 16.

However, Pettenuzzo began to show disciplinary problems at the highest level of the game. Most notably, the defender came off the bench for Brescia in the away leg of their Round of 16 tie against Montpellier. Brescia were already 3–0 down on the scoreline by the time Pettenuzzo entered the pitch, but conceded a fourth goal just one minute after Pettenuzzo's substitution. Pettenuzzo would pick up two yellow cards within nine minutes of entering the game, getting herself sent off and leaving Brescia down to ten players for the rest of the match. Brescia would lose that match 6–0 by the final whistle. Pettenuzzo's loan expired by the summer of 2018, and the defender took up another loan move with Serie A side Sassuolo for the 2018–2019 season.

Pettenuzzo's performances with Sassuolo were enough to catch the attention of A.S. Roma coach Betty Bavagnoli, and Roma would sign Pettenuzzo in the summer of 2019. In Pettenuzzo's second season with Roma, she won a Coppa Italia winner's medal after her club beat AC Milan on penalties in the 30 May 2021 final. On 22 July 2021, Pettenuzzo committed her future to Roma by signing a two-year contract extension with the club through to the summer of 2023.

On 13 August 2023, Pettenuzzo signed a contract with Napoli.

== International career ==
Tecla Pettenuzzo first began to get called up to youth level Italy squads in 2015 after Italy U-17 coach Enrico Sbardella took notice of the defender's game. However, Pettenuzzo would have to wait a further year before she made her debut at youth level with the Italy U-19 team on 20 October 2016 against North Macedonia. The Italy U-19 team won that match 4–0.

Pettenuzzo earned her first call-up to the senior Italy squad in September 2020. However, Pettenuzzo has yet to make an appearance at senior level for her country.

== Style of play ==
Tecla Pettenuzzo is a ball-playing defender who uses her sense of anticipation and read of the game to transition her team's play from defence to attack, often within the same sequence of play. Her abilities led to her creating 2 assists within her first ten appearances for A.S. Roma. Her early anticipation and ability to send through-balls to the frontline were notable in Roma's October 2020 league win over Hellas Verona, where Pettenuzzo intercepted a 41st minute Verona pass before immediately creating a long-range assist for Roma teammate Annamaria Serturini's goal. Pettenuzzo is also an extremely effective dribbler in possession, using her technique to resist pressure from opponents and drive the ball up the pitch.
