= 2024–25 Serie B (women) =

Serie B Femminile
- Season: 2024–25
- Dates: 31 August 2024 – 18 May 2025
- Matches played: 15
- Goals scored: 50 (3.33 per match)
- Biggest home win: Chievo Verona 6–0 Pavia Academy; 31 August 2024
- Biggest away win: Res Women 1–3 Bologna; 1 September 2024; San Marino Academy 0–2 Freedom; 1 September 2024; Brescia 1–3 Cesena; 1 September 2024; Hellas Verona 0–2 Parma; 15 September 2024
- Highest scoring: Pavia Academy 3–4 Brescia; 15 September 2024
- All statistics correct as of 17 August 2025.

The 2024–25 season of the Serie B is the 55th season of Italy's second-tier semi-professional women's football league.

On 27 July 2024, FIGC announced that Serie A will be expanding to 12 teams, while Serie B will shrink to 14 teams starting in the 2025–26 season. Due to this, three teams get directly promoted to Serie A this season, with no relegation play-off. Three teams still get relegated to Serie C, as usual.

The schedule for the 2024–25 edition has been announced on 1 August 2024, with the first and last matchdays scheduled for 1 September 2024 and 18 May 2025, respectively. The first two matches ended being rescheduled and played already on 31 August 2024

== Teams ==
Locations of teams in the 2024–25 Serie B Femminile.

=== Team changes ===
There have been some irregular team changes between the 2023–24 and 2024–25 seasons. Pomigliano CF, having been relegated from the 2023–24 Serie A has failed to register for Serie B. Furthermore ASD Meran Women, one of the Serie C group winners in the 2023–24 season has been found ineligible by FIGC. Orobica Bergamo, the runner-up of 2023–24 Serie C group A, and Pavia Academy, the 14th place finisher in the 2023–24 season of Serie B set for relegation, have been admitted to Serie B to fill the gaps.

Entering league		Exiting league	
Promoted from 2023–24 Serie C	Relegated from 2023–24 Serie A	Promoted to 2024–25 Serie A	Relegated to 2024–25 Serie C
FC Lumezzane; Orobica Bergamo; Vis Mediterranea		S.S. Lazio	Ravenna FC; ASD UPC Tavagnacco

=== Personnel and kits ===
Team	Manager	Kit manufacturer	Shirt sponsor(s)	
Team	Manager	Kit manufacturer	Main	Other
Arezzo	(Italy) Ilaria Leoni	Zeus	Chimera Gold	List: Front: UnoAErre; Back: Estra Energie; Sleeves: SPAM Srl; Shorts: GP Motors Arezzo
Bologna	(Italy) Matteo Pachera	Macron	Elisabetta Franchi	List: Front: None; Back: Selenella; Sleeves: Lavoropiù; Shorts: None
Brescia	(Italy) Giovanni Valenti	Macron	None	List: Front: None; Back: Argometal; Sleeves: None; Shorts: Colosio Srl
Cesena	(Italy) Alain Conte	Erreà	CDO Green Energy	List: Front: None; Back: E.CO Energia Corrente; Sleeves: Vitobello Ricambi; Shorts: None
Chievo Verona	(Italy) Fabio Ulderici	Givova	Harley&Dikkinson	List: Front: None; Back: None; Sleeves: Qwarzo; Shorts: None
Freedom	(Italy) Michele Ardito	Umbro	None	None
Genoa	(Italy) Fabio Fossati	Kappa	Niasca Portofino	List: Front: LaMiaLiguria; Back: San Giorgio del Porto; Sleeves: None; Shorts: None
Hellas Verona	(Italy) Giacomo Venturi	Joma	Riseria Ferron	List: Front: Air Dolomiti; Back: None; Sleeves: UCI Cinemas; Shorts: Farmacia Zai
Lumezzane	(Italy) Nicoletta Mazza	Acerbis	Camozzi	List: Front: None; Back: Pederzani Impianti; Sleeves: None; Shorts: None
Orobica Bergamo	(Italy) Marianna Marini	In-house	CR Technology Systems (Third)	List: Front: None; Back: AriBerg Compressori (Home) / Bar Bogni (Away); Sleeves: None; Shorts: LM Promo
Parma	(Italy) Salvatore Colantuono	Puma	Oxfam	List: Front: Fidenza Village; Back: Lavoropiù; Sleeves: Colser Servizi; Shorts: Uagliò Pizzeria
Pavia Academy	(Italy) Silvio Cassaro	Adidas	None	None
Res Women	(Italy) Paolo Ruggeri	Joma	Tiscali	None
San Marino Academy	(Italy) Francesco Baldarelli	Erreà	Marlù Gioielli	List: Front: None; Back: None; Sleeves: Ntssport; Shorts: Reabilita Sport Tech
Ternana	(Italy) Antonio Cincotta	Macron	Unicusano	List: Front: None; Back: LeadBroker&Consulting; Sleeves: Farmacia Scoccianti; Shorts: Biosana Ambulatorio Polispecialistico
Vis Mediterranea	(Italy) Vincenzo Rispoli	Givova	None	None

== League table ==
Pos	Team	Pld	W	D	L	GF	GA	GD	Pts	Promotion or relegation
1	Ternana	24	20	3	1	62	16	+46	63	Promotion to 2025–26 Serie A
2	Parma	24	19	4	1	63	10	+53	61	Promotion to 2025–26 Serie A
3	Genoa	24	16	3	5	58	15	+43	51	Promotion to 2025–26 Serie A
4	Bologna	24	16	3	5	63	20	+43	51	
5	Lumezzane	24	13	5	6	39	26	+13	44	
6	Brescia	24	11	2	11	53	36	+17	35	
7	Arezzo	24	11	1	12	32	37	−5	34	
8	Chievo Verona	24	10	3	11	44	37	+7	33	
9	Freedom	24	9	6	9	29	27	+2	33	
10	Cesena	23	10	2	11	40	32	+8	32	
11	Res Women	24	9	2	13	23	39	−16	29	
12	Hellas Verona	24	8	1	15	31	41	−10	25	
13	Orobica Bergamo	24	6	3	15	21	57	−36	21	
14	San Marino Academy	24	6	2	16	26	68	−42	20	Relegation to 2025–26 Serie C
15	Pavia Academy	24	5	2	17	21	74	−53	17	Relegation to 2025–26 Serie C
16	Vis Mediterranea	23	0	2	21	3	73	−70	2	Relegation to 2025–26 Serie C

Updated to match(es) played on 30 March 2025. Source: FIGC.it
Rules for classification: Tiebreakers

== Results ==
Home \ Away	ARE	BOL	BRE	CES	CHI	FRE	GEN	HEL	LUM	ORO	PAR	PAV	RES	SAN	TER	VIS
SS Arezzo		2–0	0–3	0–1	1–3	1–0	1–2	3–1	1–1	3–0	27 Apr	2–0	2–0	11 May	13 Apr	3–0
Bologna FC	6–1		2–1	3–1	0–2	2–0	0–0	4–0	13 Apr	18 May	0–2	6–0	2–0	5–1	27 Apr	10–0
Brescia	16 Mar	22 Sep		1–3	19 Jan	2 Mar	13 Oct	19 Apr	27 Apr	17 Nov	15 Dec	2 Feb	11 May	3 Nov	29 Sep	30 Mar
Cesena FC	3 Nov	11 May	26 Jan		9 Feb	16 Mar	30 Mar	17 Nov	15 Dec	19 Apr	2 Mar	8 Dec	19 Jan	29 Sep	0–1	13 Oct
Chievo Verona	19 Apr	4 May	18 May	22 Sep		17 Nov	3 Nov	12 Jan	6 Oct	2 Feb	30 Mar	6–0	16 Feb	16 Mar	9 Mar	8 Dec
Freedom FC	4 May	23 Mar	6 Oct	20 Oct	13 Apr		2–1	16 Feb	9 Mar	8 Dec	18 May	10 Nov	9 Feb	26 Jan	24 Nov	12 Jan
Genoa CFC	18 May	6 Oct	9 Mar	10 Nov	23 Mar	2 Feb		4 May	16 Feb	12 Jan	24 Nov	22 Sep	13 Apr	8 Dec	20 Oct	3–0 (Note: Awarded.)
Hellas Verona	26 Jan	10 Nov	24 Nov	13 Apr	11 May	29 Sep	15 Dec		19 Jan	13 Oct	0–2	20 Oct	27 Apr	9 Feb	23 Mar	2 Mar
FC Lumezzane	9 Feb	17 Nov	8 Dec	4 May	2 Mar	13 Oct	29 Sep	18 May		30 Mar	16 Mar	12 Jan	3–0	19 Apr	16 Jan	3 Nov
Orobica Bergamo	2 Mar	19 Jan	13 Apr	24 nov	1–0	27 Apr	11 May	9 Mar	10 Nov		26 Jan	23 Mar	20 Oct	15 Dec	9 Feb	29 Sep
Parma	8 Dec	9 Mar	4 May	6 Oct	10 Nov	19 Jan	19 Apr	2 Feb	20 Oct	4–0		16 Feb	23 Mar	17 Nov	11 May	22 Sep
Pavia Academy	13 Oct	19 Apr	3–4	27 Apr	26 Jan	30 Mar	9 Feb	16 Mar	11 May	3 Nov	29 Sep		15 Dec	2 Mar	19 Jan	17 Nov
Res Women	30 Mar	1–3	12 Jan	18 May	29 Sep	22 Sep	17 Nov	8 Dec	2 Feb	16 Mar	3 Nov	4 May		13 Oct	2 Mar	19 Apr
San Marino Academy	12 Jan	2 Feb	23 Mar	16 Feb	20 Oct	0–2	27 Apr	22 Sep	24 Nov	4 May	13 Apr	6 Oct	9 Mar		10 Nov	18 May
Ternana	17 Nov	8 Dec	16 Feb	2 Feb	13 Oct	19 Apr	16 Mar	3 Nov	2–0	22 Sep	12 Jan	18 May	6 Oct	30 Mar		4 May
Vis Mediterranea	0–1	20 Oct	10 Nov	9 Mar	27 Apr	11 May	26 Jan	6 Oct	23 Mar	16 Feb	9 Feb	13 Apr	24 Nov	19 Jan	15 Dec	

Updated to match(es) played on 15 September 2024. Source: FIGC.it
Legend: Blue = home team win; Yellow = draw; Red = away team win.
