= Alessia Capelletti =

Italian footballer (born 1998)

Personal information
- Full name: Alessia Capelletti
- Date of birth: 13 October 1998 (age 28)
- Place of birth: Cremona, Italy
- Position: Goalkeeper

Team information
- Current team: Como on loan from Juventus
- Number: 13

Senior career*
Years	Team	Apps	(Gls)
2015–2017	Atalanta	5	(0)
2019–2020	Tavagnacco	16	(0)
2020–2022	Empoli	33	(0)
2022–2024	Parma	37	(0)
2024–	Juventus	2	(0)
2026	→ Como (loan)	1	(0)
2026–	→ Genoa (loan)		

International career
2017	Italy U19	1	(0)
- * Club domestic league appearances and goals as of 21 September 2026

Alessia Capelletti (born 13 October 1998) is an Italian professional footballer who plays as a goalkeeper for Como on loan from Juventus.
