= Giulia Parodi =

Italian footballer

Personal information
- Full name: Giulia Parodi
- Date of birth: 28 June 2002 (age 24)
- Place of birth: Genoa, Italy
- Position: Forward

Team information
- Current team: Sampdoria
- Number: 45

Youth career
- 2016–2019: Genoa Cricket

Senior career*
Years	Team	Apps	(Gls)
2019–2024	Genoa	100	(52)
2024–2025	Spezia	27	(21)
2025–2026	Vicenza	26	(9)
2026–	UC Sampdoria	?	(9)
- * Club domestic league appearances and goals as of 17 November 2026

Giulia Parodi (born 28 June 2002) is an Italian footballer who plays as a forward for Serie C club Sampdoria.

== Club career ==
Giulia Parodi grew up as a footballer in Genoa since the creation of the female youth squad, in 2015.

Since 2019 she plays in Genoa senior team, scoring the first goal ever of the team in a league.

In 2019/20 Genoa achieved the first position in Eccellenza, winning 10 matches out of 10 before the tournament was stopped due to the COVID-19 pandemic. Here Parodi scored 13 goals, becoming top scorer of the team.

In the 2020/21 and 2021/22 seasons, Parodi played in Serie C, making 49 appearances and scoring 34 goals, confirming herself both seasons as the squad's topscorer, then Genoa acquired the sporting title of the women's Serie B team Cortefranca in the summer of 2022 and obtained with it the right to register for Serie B. Here Giulia made 41 caps and scored 5 goals in two years.

In 2021 she was also convocated for the Italian national Amateur football team Under-21.

Giulia Parodi has become the first Genoa player scoring in a match in Eccellenza, the first Genoa player scoring in a match in Serie C, the first Genoa player scoring in a match in Serie B.

In the summer of 2024, she transferred to Spezia, where she won Group A of Serie C, earning promotion to Serie B. She also completed the double by winning the first-ever Coppa Italia Serie C for a women's team from Liguria.

== Career statistics ==
As of 17 November 2026

Appearances and goals by club, season and competition
Club	Season	League			National cup (Note: Includes Coppa Italia, Coppa Italia Serie C and Coppa Italia Eccellenza)		League cup		Total	
Club	Season	Division	Apps	Goals	Apps	Goals	Apps	Goals	Apps	Goals
Genoa	2019–20	Eccellenza	8	13	3	1	—		11	14
Genoa	2020–21	Serie C	22	15	2	4	—		24	19
Genoa	2021–22	Serie C	29	19	3	2	—		32	21
Genoa	2022–23	Serie B	20	4	2	0	—		22	4
Genoa	2023–24	Serie B	21	1	1	0	—		22	1
Genoa	Total		100	52	11	7	—		111	59
Spezia	2024–25	Serie C	27	21	6	2	—		33	23
Vicenza	2025–26	Serie B	26	9	1	2	—		27	11
Sampdoria	2026-27	Serie C	5	9	1	0	—		6	9
Career total			158	91	19	11	—		177	102

== Honours ==
Spezia

- Serie C 2024/2025 (gir. A)
- Coppa Italia Serie C 2024/2025
