= Caroline Pleidrup =

Danish footballer (born 2000)

Personal information
- Full name: Caroline Pleidrup Gram
- Date of birth: 11 December 2000 (age 25)
- Place of birth: Brøndbyvester, Denmark
- Height: 1.73 m (5 ft 8 in)
- Position: Centre-back

Team information
- Current team: Napoli

Youth career
- 2007–2017: Brøndby IF

Senior career*
Years	Team	Apps	(Gls)
2017–2022	Brøndby IF	103	(3)
2022–2025	Sassuolo	72	(2)
2025–	Inter	14	(0)
2026–	→ Napoli (loan)		

International career^{‡}
2015–2016	Denmark U16	3	(0)
2016–2017	Denmark U17	9	(0)
2017–2019	Denmark U19	19	(1)
2019–	Denmark U23	11	(1)
2024–	Denmark	1	(0)
- * Club domestic league appearances and goals as of 30 March 2025 ‡ National team caps and goals as of 6 April 2025

Caroline Pleidrup Gram (born 11 December 2000) is a Danish professional footballer who plays as a centre-back for Italian Serie A club Napoli Women, on loan from Inter Milan, and the Denmark national team.

== Career ==
A defender from her days in schools football, Pleidrup played for Brøndby IF's first team from December 2017 to 2022, and joined Italian Serie A Femminile side Sassuolo in the summer of the latter year, citing the extra physicality of the Italian league as an attractive factor in her move.

After finishing sixth with her new club in 2023, Pleidrup enjoyed a fourth-place finish with Sassuolo in 2024.

== International career ==
Pleidrup has won 38 caps at underage level for Denmark, 19 of them at Under-19 level.

She made her debut for the Denmark senior women's team on 28 February 2024 in a 1–1 draw against Austria in an international friendly.

== Personal ==
Pleidrup has studied law.

== Honours ==
Brøndby IF

- Elitedivisionen: Winner: 2019; Runners-up: 2018
- Danish Cup: Winner: 2018; Runners-up: 2019
