= UnoAErre =

Italian jewellery company

Coordinates: 43.426962°N 11.8254981°E

Unoaerre
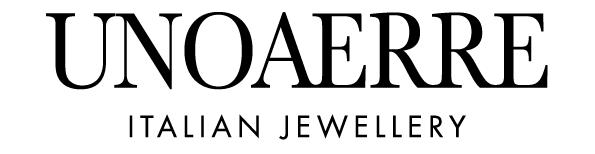

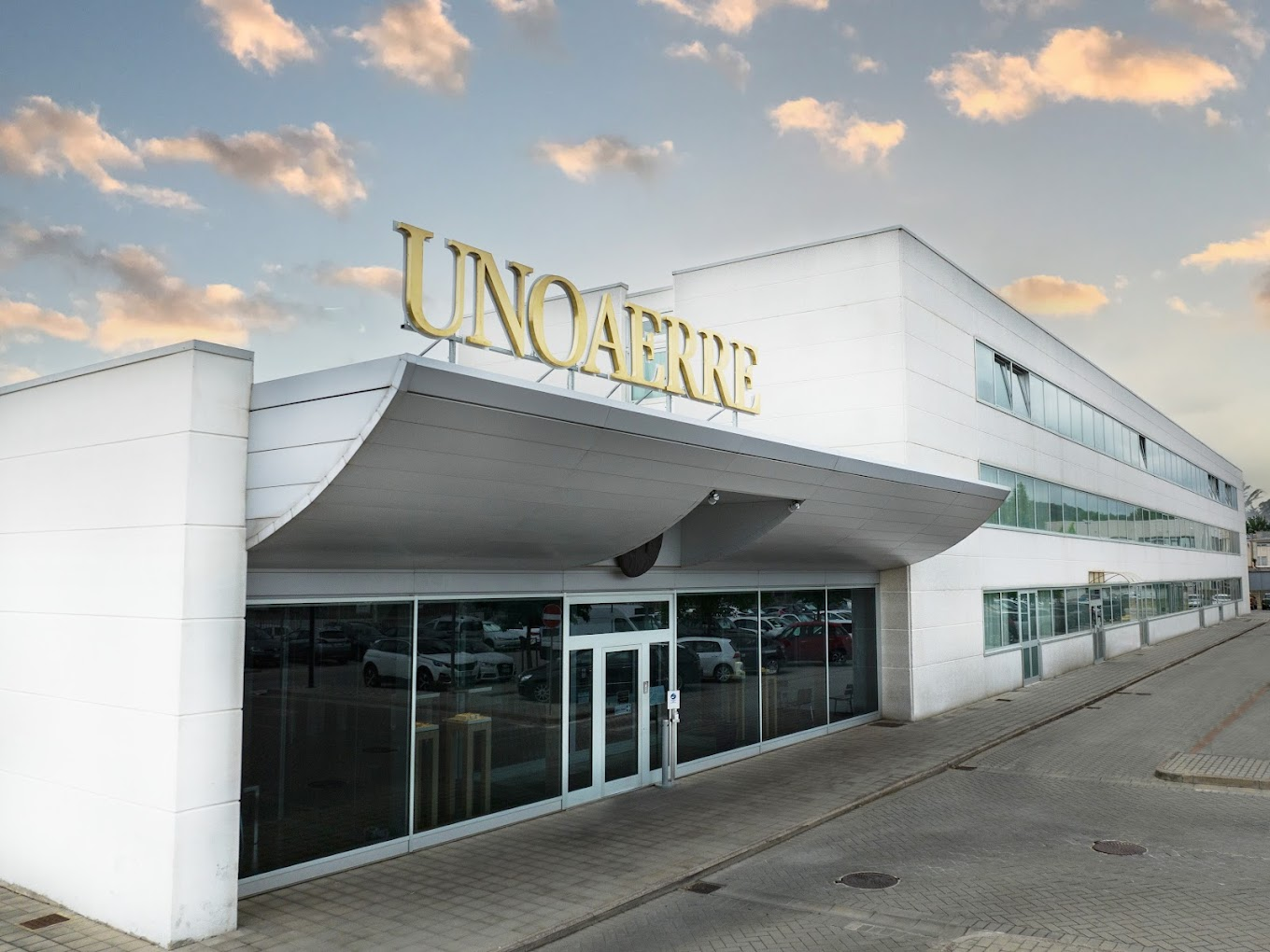
- Type: Private company
- Industry: Jewelry
- Founded: March 15, 1926; 100 years ago
- Founder: Leopoldo Gori; Carlo Zucchi
- Successor: Maria Cristina Squarcialupi
- Headquarters: Arezzo, Italy
- Key people: Maria Cristina Squarcialupi, president
- Products: Gold and jewelry
- Owner: Zucchi family
- Number of employees: 500 (2008)
- Website: www.unoaerre.it

Unoaerre is the most important goldsmith company in Arezzo, a city that is one of the main centers of Italian goldsmithing, along with Valenza and Vicenza.

== Origin of the name Unoaerre ==
The name UNOAERRE owes its origin to the introduction of a law that regulated the production and trade of precious metals.[2]

This law required every Italian company producing precious metals to apply an official identification hallmark.

Gori & Zucchi was the first company to submit a request and was assigned the State hallmark "1AR". Later, in the 1950s, this hallmark was also registered as the company’s trademark.

== History ==
=== Origins ===
Unoaerre was founded on March 15, 1926, in Arezzo by Carlo Zucchi, a craftsman and owner of a small goldsmith’s shop inherited from his father, and Leopoldo Gori, a sales representative.

The two established Gori & Zucchi, opening their first workshops in the historic center of Arezzo.

On April 2, 1934, the company was assigned the official number to be stamped on all its products, and as a goldsmith company in the province of Arezzo, it received 1AR. This code, written out in full, would later become both the trademark and the official name of the company.

The two founders had the foresight—later proven to be a great success—to introduce industrial production methods into the goldsmithing sector, which allowed for a significant reduction in manufacturing costs of the finished product.

=== Second Half of the Twentieth Century ===
Unoaerre experienced its greatest growth and production boom during the 1960s, when the company employed up to 1,500 people. In the 1970s, a spin-off from the company led to the creation of Chimet, dedicated to recovering precious metal residues.

It was also in the 1960s that Unoaerre began to establish significant ties with the cultural world.[1]

Long before corporate sponsorship became widespread, the Arezzo-based goldsmith company launched in 1966 a literary prize “for a work of fiction or poetry suitable for children”. The jury was chaired by Nobel Prize winner Salvatore Quasimodo and included poet Elio Filippo Accrocca and Mario Guidotti. This noble initiative, of high cultural value, marked the beginning of Unoaerre’s more frequent interactions with the arts community.

By the late 1990s, the company faced financial difficulties. In 1999, a private equity fund of Deutsche Bank, Morgan Grenfell, acquired a majority stake in the company.[2] The fund exited in 2007, when the Zucchi family regained ownership with the support of several banks.[3] Despite this, the company continued to post losses.[2][4]

In November 2010, Unoaerre filed for credit protection with the court. At the request of creditor banks MPS and Intesa Sanpaolo, Sergio Squarcialupi—head of Chimet and former CEO of Unoaerre in the 1990s—was appointed to lead the company. In 2011, Unoaerre completed its third relocation, moving into a new facility on the outskirts of Arezzo.

=== A New Era ===
In 2012, Sergio Squarcialupi acquired 100% of Unoaerre,[5] initiating a phase of restructuring and consolidation.

In 2022, Unoaerre expanded and diversified its operations by acquiring 68% of Ercolani Romano Galvanotecnica Srl, thus completing a fully integrated manufacturing cycle—from raw material production (precious metals) to the creation of the final product.[6]

Despite a challenging global environment, Unoaerre continued its growth in 2022, thanks to a diversified business model and revamped sales channels. The company closed 2022 with a turnover of €276 million (+13% compared to 2021) and an EBITDA of around €21 million, up from €13 million in 2021 (+58%).

In 2020, the company also introduced a dedicated sustainability report.

== Museum ==
At the company’s headquarters, a museum has been established: the Unoaerre Museum, featuring a section dedicated to "goldsmith industrial archaeology" (vintage machinery) and an exhibition of the most iconic jewelry pieces that have marked the company’s production.

The collection also includes works created in collaboration with renowned artists such as Salvatore Fiume, Pietro Cascella, Salvador Dalí, and Giò Pomodoro.[1][2]
