= 2020–21 Serie A (women) =

54th season of top women's football (soccer) league in Italy

Serie A (women)
- Season: 2020–21
- Dates: 23 August 2020 – 23 May 2021
- Champions: Juventus
- Relegated: San Marino; Bari
- Women's Champions League: Juventus; Milan
- Matches: 130
- Goals: 413 (3.18 per match)
- Top goalscorer: Cristiana Girelli (22 goals)
- Biggest home win: Empoli 10–0 San Marino (23 August 2020)
- Biggest away win: San Marino 0–5 Milan (29 August 2020); Bari 1–6 Milan (27 February 2021)
- Highest scoring: Empoli 10–0 San Marino (23 August 2020)
- Longest winning run: Juventus (22 matches)
- Longest unbeaten run: Juventus (22 matches)

The 2020–21 Serie A (women) was the 54th season of the women's football top level league in Italy. It began on 23 August 2020 and concluded on 23 May 2021. Juventus were the defending champions, after being crowned league winners as the previous season could not be completed due to the COVID-19 pandemic. They won the competition for fourth consecutive season, equalling the feat reached by Torres in 2013. The Bianconere became the ninth in the Italian women's top flight to won the competition unbeaten, equalling the result achieved the previous season, becoming also the third to reach it in consecutive seasons and the first to accomplish a perfect season having won all their league matches, an unprecedented feat in Italian men's or women's football history. Consequently, the club holds the record for the most points in a championship with 12 team contestants (66).

== Teams ==
=== Stadiums and locations ===
Locations of the 2020–21 Serie A teams

Team	Home city	Stadium	2019–20 season
Empoli	Empoli	Centro sportivo Monteboro	8th in Serie A
Fiorentina	Florence	Stadio Gino Bozzi	2nd in Serie A
Florentia	San Gimignano	Stadio Santa Lucia	7th in Serie A
Internazionale	Milan	Stadio Felice Chinetti	6th in Serie A
Juventus	Turin	Juventus Center	Champions
Milan	Milan	Centro Sportivo Vismara	3rd in Serie A
Napoli	Naples	Stadio Caduti di Brema	1st in Serie B
Bari	Bari	Stadio Antonio Antonucci (Bitetto)	10th in Serie A
Roma	Rome	Stadio Tre Fontane	4th in Serie A
San Marino	San Marino	Campo Sportivo Acquaviva	2nd in Serie B
Sassuolo	Sassuolo	Stadio Enzo Ricci	5th in Serie A
Hellas Verona	Verona	Stadio Aldo Olivieri	9th in Serie A

== League table ==
Pos	Team	Pld	W	D	L	GF	GA	GD	Pts	Qualification or relegation
1	Juventus (C)	22	22	0	0	75	10	+65	66	Qualification to Champions League first round
2	Milan	22	16	3	3	47	17	+30	51	Qualification to Champions League first round
3	Sassuolo	22	16	2	4	47	20	+27	50	
4	Fiorentina	22	12	2	8	40	30	+10	38	
5	Roma	22	10	7	5	35	25	+10	37	
6	Empoli	22	9	4	9	47	40	+7	31	
7	Florentia (Note: Florentia were docked 1 point due to a breach of financial agreements.)	22	9	3	10	24	37	−13	29	
8	Internazionale	22	7	4	11	31	44	−13	25	
9	Hellas Verona	22	6	3	13	16	33	−17	21	
10	Napoli	22	3	5	14	22	38	−16	14	
11	San Marino (R)	22	3	3	16	16	58	−42	12	Relegation to Serie B
12	Bari (R)	22	1	0	21	13	61	−48	3	Relegation to Serie B

Source: FIGC (fixtures, ranking)
Rules for classification: 1) Points; 2) Head-to-head points; 3) Head-to-head goal difference; 4) Goal difference; 5) Goals scored; 6) Draw
(C) Champions; (R) Relegated

== Match results ==
Home \ Away	EMP	FIO	FLO	INT	JUV	MIL	NAP	BAR	ROM	SMA	SAS	VER
Empoli	—	1–1	6–2	1–1	0–3	0–3	1–0	3–1	2–0	10–0	1–6	2–1
Fiorentina	2–1	—	3–2	4–0	1–2	0–1	2–0	3–1	1–2	3–1	1–3	0–1
Florentia	2–1	2–0	—	1–0	1–2	1–2	1–0	2–1	1–1	0–0	1–5	1–0
Internazionale	3–3	2–3	0–2	—	0–3	1–4	0–0	3–0	1–1	2–0	1–4	1–0
Juventus	4–3	4–0	6–1	5–0	—	4–0	2–0	9–1	4–1	2–0	4–0	5–0
Milan	1–0	1–3	1–0	4–1	0–1	—	4–0	3–1	1–0	4–1	2–0	2–2
Napoli	3–3	2–5	3–1	0–3	1–2	1–2	—	1–0	2–2	5–0	0–1	1–2
Bari	0–3	0–2	0–1	1–2	0–4	1–6	1–0	—	0–4	1–2	2–4	0–2
Roma	2–0	2–2	1–1	4–3	0–1	0–0	3–2	2–0	—	2–0	2–0	2–0
San Marino	1–4	1–2	1–0	2–5	1–3	0–5	0–0	4–2	2–3	—	0–2	0–2
Sassuolo	3–0	1–0	3–0	1–0	0–3	0–0	3–1	1–0	1–1	1–0	—	4–1
Hellas Verona	1–2	0–2	1–2	1–2	0–2	0–1	0–0	1–0	1–0	0–0	0–4	—

Source: FIGC
Legend: Blue = home team win; Yellow = draw; Red = away team win.

== Positions by round ==
Team ╲ Round	1	2	3	4	5	6	7	8	9	10	11	12	13	14	15	16	17	18	19	20	21	22
Empoli	1	6	5	3	4	4	4	4	4	4	4	4	6	7	5	5	5	5	6	6	6	6
Fiorentina	2	1	1	5	5	6	6	5	6	5	5	5	4	5	6	6	6	6	5	5	5	4
Florentia	8	7	7	9	8	7	8	8	8	8	7	7	7	6	7	7	7	7	7	8	7	7
Internazionale	11	11	9	7	7	9	7	7	5	6	8	8	8	8	8	8	8	8	8	7	8	8
Juventus	3	3	3	1	1	1	1	1	1	1	1	1	1	1	1	1	1	1	1	1	1	1
Milan	4	2	2	4	3	3	2	2	2	2	2	2	2	2	2	2	2	2	2	2	2	2
Napoli	9	10	11	11	12	12	12	12	12	12	12	11	11	11	11	11	10	10	10	10	10	10
Bari	5	8	8	10	11	10	11	11	11	11	11	12	12	12	12	12	12	12	12	12	12	12
Roma	6	5	6	6	6	5	5	6	7	7	6	6	5	4	4	4	4	4	4	4	4	5
San Marino Academy	12	12	12	8	10	11	10	10	10	10	10	10	10	10	10	10	11	11	11	11	11	11
Sassuolo	7	4	4	2	2	2	3	3	3	3	3	3	3	3	3	3	3	3	3	3	3	3
Hellas Verona	10	9	10	12	9	8	9	9	9	9	9	9	9	9	9	9	9	9	9	9	9	9

Leader / Champions League first round
Champions League first round
Relegation to Serie B

Updated to match(es) played on 23 May 2021. Source: Soccerway

== Season's statistics ==
=== Topscorers ===
Rank	Player	Club	Goals
1	(Italy) Cristiana Girelli	Juventus	22
2	(Italy) Valentina Giacinti	Milan	18
3	(Italy) Daniela Sabatino	Fiorentina	16
4	(England) Natasha Dowie	Milan	12
4	(Malta) Haley Bugeja	Sassuolo	12
5	(Italy) Benedetta Glionna	Hellas Verona	10
5	(Italy) Valeria Pirone	Sassuolo	10

=== Assists ===
Rank	Player	Club	Assists
1	(Italy) Barbara Bonansea	Juventus	9
1	(Italy) Cecilia Prugna	Empoli	9
3	(Brazil) Maria Alves	Juventus	7
3	(France) Annahita Zamanian	Juventus	7
3	(Italy) Valeria Pirone	Sassuolo	7
6	(Czech Republic) Kamila Dubcová	Sassuolo	5
6	(England) Natasha Dowie	Milan	5
6	(Czech Republic) Andrea Stašková	Juventus	5
6	(Italy) Flaminia Simonetti	Internazionale	5
6	(Italy) Sofia Cantore	Florentia S.G	5
