= Women's football in Italy =

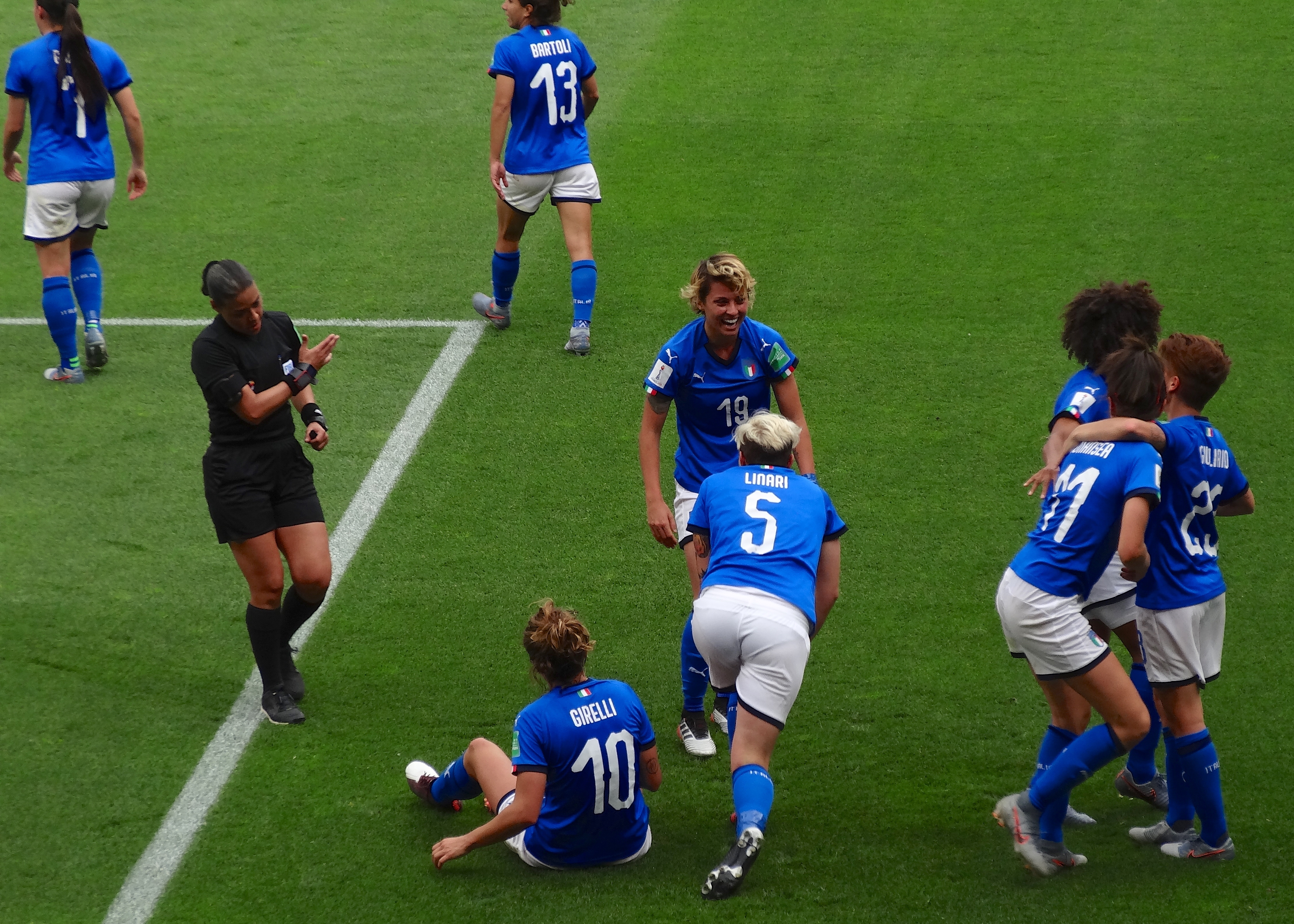
- The women's national team during the 2019 FIFA Women's World Cup.
- Country: Italy
- Governing body: Italian Football Federation
- National team: Women's national team

National competitions
- Italian Women's Cup; Italian Women's Super Cup

Club competitions
- Serie A; Serie B; Serie C; Eccellenza; Promozione

International competitions
- Champions League; FIFA Women's World Cup (national team); European Championship (national team); Olympics (national team)

Women's association football is a newly professionalised sport in Italy relative to the greater emphasis of the male competitions. However, it was also one of the first nations to host professional women's football after the era of European bans on women playing the sport came to a close in the 1970s, among the first modern European markets to import footballers from other European nations and hosted the first unofficial edition of the Women's World Cup in 1970.

== History ==
In February 1933, in Milan, the Feminine Football Group (Gruppo Femminile Calcistico) was formed as the first organized women's football club; the girls played on the pitch wearing petticoats. However, the activity lasted only about 9 months because, after the enthusiasm given by the release of the news on Calcio Illustrato which published an entire page with the photos of the Milanese girls, other girls' teams were set up in different cities. To prevent the "phenomenon" from taking hold, the Italian National Olympic Committee (CONI) prevented women from being able to play not only tournaments but above all individual competitions, hijacking female footballers in various athletic sports.

In 1946 two teams were formed in Trieste: Triestina and San Giusto. Four years later in Naples, the Italian Football Women's Association (Associazione Italiana Calcio Femminile) was formed, which continued its activities until 1959. However, an official championship was yet to be formed.

In 1968 the Italian Women's Football Federation (Federazione Italiana Calcio Femminile, FICF) was born: the Italian championship was played with two groups of five teams and in the final in Pisa the first championship was awarded to A.C.F. Genova, who won against Roma. This situation of stability lasted only two years: indeed, on 31 January 1970, ten clubs decided to abandon the FICF and formed the Italian Federation of Female Football (FFIGC).

In 1970 the FFIGC hosted the first unofficial football Women's World Cup, also known as the Martini Rosso Cup. The tournament was organized entirely without the involvement of FIFA or any of the common national associations. Seven teams appeared in the tournament with Boldklubben Femina, representing Denmark, beating Italy 2–0 in the final to win the title.

In 1972 a 45-team qualifying championship was held divided into four groups. The Serie B, the only regional level, was transformed into the national league which was given the name of Interregional Serie A (Serie A Interregionale) in the first three years, and many professional women's teams started in the 1970s.

With an interregional Serie C being inaugurated, in 1983 the foundations were laid for the development of youth categories, constituting the Esordienti championship in 1979 (which in 1982 became the Serie D). However, it was only in 1986 that women's football lost its autonomy and enters the ranks of the Italian Football Federation (FIGC).

The national activity was developed as follows: the Serie A with 16 participating teams and single round; the Serie B divided into three groups of 14 teams. The Supercoppa was set up to be played between the winners of the Italian Women's Cup and the Serie A championship. In 1998, the clubs participating in the Serie B were divided into 4 groups of 12 teams with final playoffs to identify the three winners who would enter the Serie A. While previously run by the Lega Nazionale Dilettanti (LND), starting from the 2018–19 season the Serie A and Serie B championships have been run by the FIGC.

== League ==
The league system is divided into five tiers: Serie A and Serie B as single divisions, Serie C divided into four groups, and Eccellenza and Promozione divided into further regional groups.

=== National divisions ===
==== Serie A ====
The Serie A is a tournament that takes place between 12 teams. The team that gets the most points during the season wins the league title and qualifies for the UEFA Women's Champions League. The 2nd place team also earns a place in the UEFA Women's Champions League. Two teams are relegated to the Serie B.

Serie A became fully professionalized for the first time in the 2022–23 season.

==== Serie B ====
The Serie B (formerly Serie A2) is the second division of women's football in Italy. The league is made up of 12 teams competing in a single round. The first two classified are promoted directly to the Serie A, while the last two are relegated directly to the Serie C. The ninth and tenth ranked go through a relegation play-off with the Serie C teams that came out defeated by the promotion playoffs.

==== Serie C ====
Starting from the 2018–19 season, the Serie C became the third division with an interregional national championship consisting of four groups of 12 or 14 teams. The first ranked of each group play in the promotion play-off, in which the two winners are promoted to the Serie B. The two losing teams play a play-off with the ninth and tenth place in Serie B to determine who should participate in the Serie B the following season.

=== Regional divisions ===
The remaining structure of the Italian football league is divided into two more levels. The first of each division are promoted to the one above. Both championships are organized by the Lega Nazionale Dilettanti (LND):

- Eccellenza
- Promozione

Level	Divisions
Professional League
1	Serie A One national division, 12 clubs
Non-professional Leagues
2	Serie B One national division, 12 clubs from 2018 to 2019 season (3–4 interregional divisions from 1970 to 2018)
3	Serie C Four interregional divisions, 12–14 clubs per division from his foundation in 2018 (Highest regional leagues until the 2017–18 season)
4	Eccellenza; 18–19 regional divisions (Highest regional leagues from 2018 to 2019; from 1978 to 2018 as Serie C)
5	Promozione; Regional divisions (Lowest regional leagues; until the 2017–18 season as Serie D)

== National team ==
The women's national team has had mixed results as team. Although they have qualified for the last two FIFA Women's World Cups in 2019 and 2023, and reached the UEFA Women's Championship finals in 1993 and 1997, the national team has yet to win a major trophy.

=== World Cup ===
Italy participated in the inaugural official FIFA Women's World Cup of 1991 where, after two wins and a loss in the group stage, they qualified for the quarter-finals, where they lost against Norway. After having failed to qualify for the second edition, Italy played in the 1999 edition where they didn't go past the group stages. For the following four editions, between 2003 and 2015, Italy failed to qualify for the World Cup, coming close in 2015 after losing in the final match of qualification to Belgium.

In 2019, Italy returned to the World Cup after a 20-year absence and won Group C. Italy then defeated China in the Round of 16 to return to the quarter-finals for the first time since 1991, where they were eliminated by eventual finalists the Netherlands.

Italy won their group in the 2023 UEFA qualifiers, securing qualification to the 2023 tournament.

== See also ==
- Football in Italy
- Italian women's football clubs in international competitions
