= San Marino Academy (women) =

Football club based in San Marino

- Full name: San Marino Academy
- Nickname: [Le] Titane (The Titans)
- Short name: San Marino
- Founded: 2004; 21 years ago
- Ground: Stadio di Acquaviva
- Capacity: 2,000
- Owner: San Marino Football Federation
- Chairman: Marco Tura
- Manager: Alain Conte
- League: Serie B
- 2022–23: Serie B, 10th of 16
- Website: https://www.fsgc.sm/prima-squadra-femminile-2/
Home colours	Away colours

San Marino Academy, or simply San Marino, is a football club based in the City of San Marino, San Marino, who play in the Italian football league system. The women's team made their debut in the Serie A, the top division of Italian women's football, in 2020–21.

Established in 2004, it is managed by the San Marino Football Federation and is the main representative of San Marino in women's football, as the country currently does not have a national championship or a national team.

In men's football, activity was limited to youth teams until 2023, playing in the Campionato Sammarinese di Calcio from the 2023–24 season.

== History ==
Women's football in San Marino began between the end of the 1980s and the beginning of the 1990s, with the activity of two teams: Dogana and Cosmos, both from Serravalle, who enrolled their teams in the Italian women's championships. However, after less than a decade, both ended their activity in women's football due to the significant reduction of female footballers, who mainly "emigrated" to nearby clubs in Emilia-Romagna.

In the 2000s the San Marino Football Federation set itself the goal of enrolling a women's team in the Italian regional championships. In the 2004–05 season, the team of the "Federazione Sammarinese Giuoco Calcio" (San Marino Football Federation) began in the Serie D Emilia-Romagna, led by coach Pier Domenico Cardelli.

In 2006–07, the youth sector was formed, with the formation of an under-13 team. In the same season, Maurizio Eraldo Reggini acquired the role of head coach of the first team, after having been assistant coach in the previous season. The 2007–08 season saw San Marino win the Serie D with 25 wins, two draws and one defeat in the league, obtaining promotion to the Serie C and also reaching the final of the Emilia Cup. In the first season in C, the San Marino Football Federation was unable to stay in the division; they were relegated to the Serie D, before returning to the Serie C having won the 2009–10 Emilia Cup.

In 2013, with the team still in Serie C, Mirco Balacich was appointed head coach. In his third season (2015–2016) he won the double (Serie C and Coppa Emilia), and the team were promoted for the first time to the Serie B. At the same time a Primavera team (under-19) was formed.

In the 2016–17 Serie B, the team finished in seventh place in group B, with Balacich replaced after 10 days by Fabio Baschetti. In the summer of 2017, the San Marino Football Federation decided to create the San Marino Academy, a project launched to manage the youth and women's activity of San Marinese football. In 2017–18, the team finished in fifth place under the new format, and were relegated to the Serie C.

In the summer of 2018, Alain Conte became coach. With him San Marino Academy won group C of the Serie C, and were promoted to the Serie B, which became a single group, defeating Riozzese 2–0 in the promotion play-offs. In 2019–20, they were in third place, behind Lazio, before the championship was suspended by the Italian Football Federation at the beginning of March due to the COVID-19 pandemic. On 25 June, San Marino were promoted to the Serie A for the first time, finishing in second place in the "corrected" ranking, based on a corrective coefficient. San Marino finished their first Serie A season in 11th place, and were relegated back to the Serie B.

== Players ==
=== Current squad ===
As of 14 September 2022

Note: Flags indicate national team as defined under FIFA eligibility rules; some limited exceptions apply. Players may hold more than one non-FIFA nationality.

No.	Pos.	Nation	Player
1	GK	SMR	Giulia Zaghini
2	DF	SMR	Alice Zaghini
3	DF	ITA	Giulia Montalti
4	MF	ITA	Ylenia Deidda
5	DF	ITA	Aurora De Sanctis
6	DF	ITA	Nicole Micciarelli
7	FW	ITA	Giulia Baldini
8	MF	ITA	Ilenia Rossi
9	FW	SMR	Yésica Menín (captain)
10	MF	SMR	Simona Innocenti
11	FW	ITA	Alison Rigaglia

No.	Pos.	Nation	Player
13	MF	ITA	Azzurra Principi
14	MF	ITA	Viola Brambilla
15	DF	ITA	Alessia Venturini
18	DF	ITA	Francesca Larocca
19	FW	ITA	Greta Di Luzio
20	DF	ITA	Martina Piazza
21	FW	ITA	Martina Bianchi
23	MF	ITA	Nausica Costantini
24	GK	ITA	Francesca Montanari
28	MF	SMR	Eleonora Cecchini
45	MF	ITA	Raffaella Barbieri
99	DF	ITA	Alessandra Piergallini

== Managerial history ==
Below is a list of San Marino Academy from 2004 until the present day.

Name	Nationality	Years
Pier Domenico Cardelli	(San Marino)	2004–2006
Maurizio Eraldo Reggini	(San Marino)	2006–2010
Andrea Tentoni	(Italy)	2010–2012
Mirco Balacich	(Italy)	2012–2016
Mirco Balacich; Fabio Baschetti	(Italy)	2016–2017
Fabio Baschetti	(Italy)	2017–2018
Alain Conte	(Italy)	2018–present

== Honours ==
- Serie C
  - Winners (2): 2015–16 (Emilia-Romagna), 2018–19 (Group C)
- Serie D
  - Winners (1): 2007–08 (Emilia-Romagna)
- Coppa Emilia
  - Winners (2): 2009–10, 2015–16

== See also ==
- List of women's football clubs in Italy
