= Napoli Women =

Italian football club

Napoli
- Full name: Napoli Women S.r.l
- Nicknames: Azzurre, Partenopee
- Founded: 2003
- Ground: Stadio comunale Giuseppe Piccolo; Cercola, Italy
- Chairman: Marco Bifulco
- Manager: Alessandro Spugna
- League: Serie A
- 2025–26: Serie A, 7th of 12
- Website: Napoli Women
Home colours	Away colours	Third colours

Napoli Women, formerly known as Società Sportiva Dilettantistica Napoli Femminile (lit. 'Napoli Women's Amateur Sports Society') and more commonly known as just Napoli, is an Italian women's football club from Naples that competes in Serie A.

== History ==
Founded as ASD Calciosmania Napoli, it took the name ASD Napoli Calcio Femminile in 2006 after merging with SSC Venus Napoli. In 2012 it reached the national cup's final, lost to ACF Brescia after extra time, and it attained promotion to Serie A for the first time. In 2017 the club merged with Napoli Dream Team and took the actual name.

After having won group D in Serie C, the club was in first position in Serie B when 2019–20 season was interrupted because of the restrictions related to the breakup of COVID-19 pandemic; the end standings were determined based on a corrective coefficient, resulting in a first place for Napoli Femminile and thus promotion to Serie A. In 2020–21 Serie A season the club ended in 10th position, avoiding the relegation in the last match of the championship. In 2021–22 Serie A season the club ended again in 10th position, but cannot avoid relegation in Serie B since the number of relegated club increased to have ten teams in the following season; relegation arrived in the last match of the season after losing against Pomigliano. In 2022–23 Serie B season the club ended in first position ahead of Lazio and thus promoted to Serie A after one season in the second tier.

Ahead of the 2025–26 season, the club was renamed to Napoli Women.

In July 2026, the club launched a complete rebrand, unveiling a new logo and identity.

== Logos ==
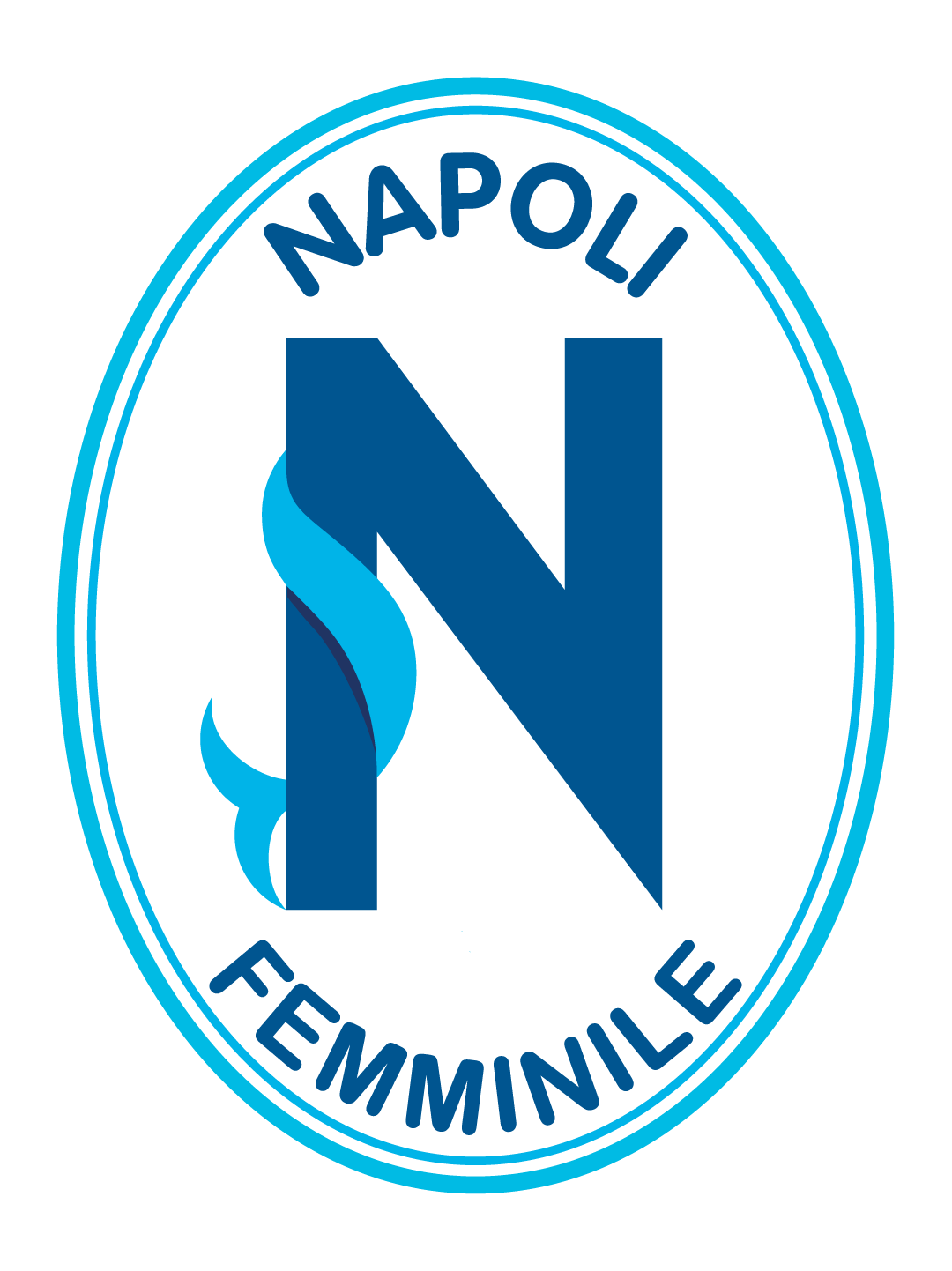
2021-2025

2025-2026

2026-

== Honours ==
- Serie A2
  - Winners (1): 2011–12 (girone D)
- Serie B
  - Winners (3): 2007–08 (girone E), 2019–20, 2022–23
- Serie C
  - Winners (1): 2018–19 (girone D),

== Current squad ==
As of 20 October 2026

Note: Flags indicate national team as defined under FIFA eligibility rules; some limited exceptions apply. Players may hold more than one non-FIFA nationality.

No.	Pos.	Nation	Player
2	DF	SEN	Dieynaba Ndaw
4	DF	DEN	Caroline Pleidrup (on loan from Inter Milan)
5	DF	BIH	Emma Veletanlic
6	DF	ITA	Tecla Pettenuzzo
7	MF	DEN	Mie Carstensen
8	MF	POL	Kinga Kozak
10	FW	SWE	Marija Banušić
11	FW	SUR	Chanté Dompig
12	DF	NGR	Chidinma Okeke
14	FW	DEN	Laura Faurskov
16	DF	DEN	Mille Jusjong
17	MF	ITA	Alessia Carcassi
18	MF	SLO	Naja Poje Mihelič (on loan from Inter Milan)

No.	Pos.	Nation	Player
19	MF	ITA	Martina Romanelli (on loan from Inter Milan)
22	GK	FIN	Sofia Manner
23	MF	ITA	Melissa Bellucci (captain)
24	DF	ITA	Alessia D'Angelo
26	DF	FRA	Olivia Romiti
31	FW	COD	Olga Massombo
43	GK	ITA	Beatrice Beretta
47	GK	ITA	Maria Gaglione
67	DF	ITA	Michela Giordano
77	MF	ENG	Elisha Sulola
90	MF	ITA	Gabriella Langella
99	FW	SUI	Emilie Mece (on loan from Juventus)

== Management ==
=== Coaching staff ===
As of 19 August 2026

Role	Coach
Head Coach	(Italy) Alessandro Spugna
Assistant Coach	(Italy) Alfonso Iennaco
Goalkeeping Coach	(Italy) Pasquale Pastore
Collaboratore Tecnico	(Italy) Dario Costantino
Fitness Coach	(Italy) Giovanni Di Pietro
Nutritionist	(Italy) Luca Borrelli
Match Analyst	(Italy) Giuseppe Duca
Match Analyst	(Italy) Raffaele Ferrara
Team Manager	(Italy) Giovanna Canale
MEDICAL STAFF
Physiotherapist	(Italy) Sossio Novelletti
Physiotherapist	(Italy) Antonio Falanga

=== Managers ===
Years	Coach
2026–	(Italy) Alessandro Spugna
2025–2026	(Italy) David Sassarini
2024	(Italy) Salvatore Mango
2023–2024	(Italy) Biagio Seno

== See also ==
- List of women's association football clubs
- List of women's football clubs in Italy
