= SSD Brescia Calcio Femminile =

Italian football club

Brescia Calcio Femminile
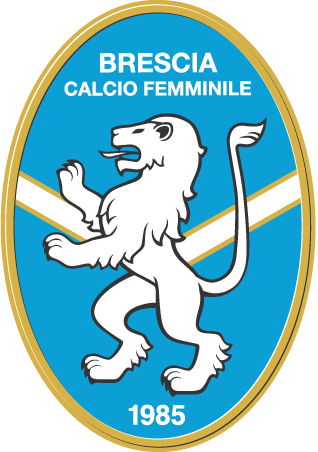
- Full name: Società Sportiva Dilettantistica Brescia Calcio Femminile
- Nickname: Leonesse (Lionesses)
- Founded: 1985
- Ground: Centro Sportivo Club Azzurri, Brescia
- Capacity: 1,500
- Chairman: Giuseppe Cesari
- League: Serie B
- 2021–22: 2nd, Serie B
Home colours	Away colours

Società Sportiva Dilettantistica Brescia Calcio Femminile, known as Brescia Calcio Femminile or simply Brescia, is an Italian women's football club from Capriolo, near Brescia. It was founded in 1985 as FCF Capriolo Arredamenti Ostilio. In 2000 it moved to Bergamo, where it played for five seasons as ACF Pro Bergamo. The team was renamed in 2005 as it returned to Capriolo. Though sharing similar colours and logos with the men's team in the city, Brescia Calcio, the women's team is not a subordinate of it; however, in 2020 a formal partnership agreement was made between them.

== History ==
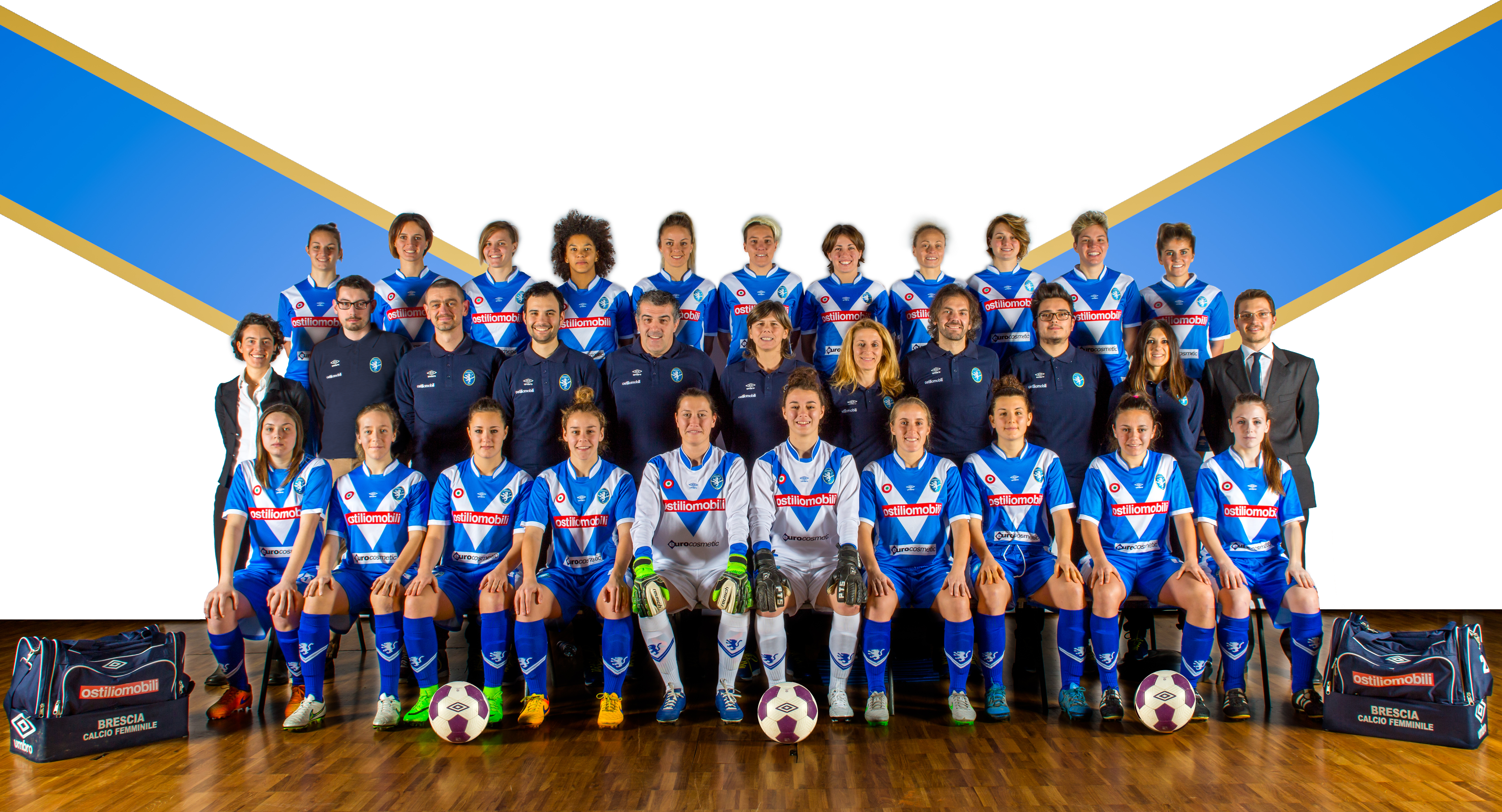
Brescia Calcio Femminile Team, season 2015–2016.

In 1994–95 the team won a regional championship. Then in 1996–97 won their Serie D division. They finished second in Serie C in 2001–02 and again in 2003–04 after which they promoted after play-off. In 2006–07 they won Serie B and got promoted to Serie A2. In 2008–09 they won Serie A2.

From 2009–10 to 2017–18, Brescia played Serie A. In its first year at the top level they were 9th, avoiding relegation. In the 2010–11 season Brescia was the surprise team of the league and competed with UPC Tavagnacco for a Champions League spot, finally ranking third. Brescia striker Daniela Sabatino was the second top scorer of the season with 25 goals, just one shy of Patrizia Panico.

They won their first national championship in 2013–14 and a second in 2015–16. Despite several important players leaving to join newly formed Juventus in the summer of 2017, Brescia maintained a high level and finished level on points with Juve in 2017–18, losing a penalty shootout at the end of the championship playoff to finish as runners-up (the same position as in 2014–15 and 2016–17).

On 11 June 2018, it was announced that male professional team A.C. Milan had bought Brescia's spot in Serie A, along with the senior player contracts, in order to start their own women's section. It was also announced that Brescia would participate in the Eccellenza league (amateur fourth tier) instead, with their youth team players. By 2021, the club had climbed back up to Serie B.

== Former players ==
For details of former players, see Category:SSD Brescia Calcio Femminile players.

== Honours ==
- Serie A champions: 2014, 2016
  - Runners-up: 2015, 2017, 2018
- Italian Cup winners: 2012, 2015, 2016
  - Finalists: 2017, 2018
- Super Cup winners: 2014, 2015, 2016, 2017

== See also ==
- List of women's football clubs in Italy
