= Genoa CFC Women =

Italian football club

Genoa CFC
- Full name: Genoa Cricket and Football Club
- Founded: 2014
- Ground: Sciorba Stadium, Genoa, Italy
- Capacity: 4,800
- Manager: Sebastiàn De La Fuente
- League: Serie B
- 2025–26: Serie A, 12th of 12, relegated to Serie B
- Website: https://genoacfc.it/it/squadra/femminile/

Genoa CFC Women is an Italian women's football club from Genoa that competes in Serie B.

== History ==
Starting from 2014, following the obligations established by the FIGC for the teams participating in the men's Serie A and Serie B, Genoa started its own women's football section.

Only the youth sector was active until 2018, when Genoa acquired the Lavagnese women's team that was competing in the Serie B. They got relegated to the Eccellenza, the Italian fourth division, at the end of the 2018/19 season and, in 2020, they got promoted back to the Serie C. After playing in the women's third division for two seasons, they acquired the sporting title of the women's Serie B from Cortefranca in the summer of 2022 and with it the right to register for Serie B 2022/23.

== Current squad ==
As of 9 September 2026

Note: Flags indicate national team as defined under FIFA eligibility rules; some limited exceptions apply. Players may hold more than one non-FIFA nationality.

No.	Pos.	Nation	Player
1	GK	ITA	Lisa Marchetti
3	DF	ITA	Martina Di Bari
5	MF	ITA	Giada Abate (captain)
8	MF	MLT	Rachel Cuschieri
9	FW	SWE	Alice Söndergaard
10	MF	ITA	Norma Cinotti
11	FW	ITA	Carolina Tironi (on loan from Inter Milan)
13	GK	ITA	Alessia Capelletti (on loan from Juventus)
15	DF	ITA	Federica Di Criscio
16	MF	ITA	Valentina Cernoia
17	FW	ITA	Arianna Acuti
18	MF	ALB	Alma Hilaj
19	MF	ITA	Elena Nichele
20	DF	CAN	Heidi Giles

No.	Pos.	Nation	Player
21	MF	ITA	Miriam Picchi
22	FW	ITA	Caterina Bargi
23	DF	ITA	Angela Passeri (on loan from Inter Milan)
27	FW	ITA	Valeria Monterubbiano
30	MF	ITA	Giulia Giacobbo
44	DF	ITA	Chiara Mele
45	DF	ITA	Alessandra Massa
67	GK	ITA	Annalisa Ruotolo
77	DF	ITA	Federica Cafferata
—	MF	ITA	Alice Campora
—	DF	ITA	Giulia Rizzon (on loan from Como)

== Club staff ==
As of 1 September 2024

Position	Staff
Manager	(Italy) Fabio Fossati
Assistant Manager	(Italy) Simone Zullo
Sporting Director	(Italy) Marta Carissimi
Team Manager	(Italy) Manuel Scalese
Goalkeeping Coach	(Italy) Dimitri Ostorero
Athletic Manager	(Italy) Giuseppe Morelato
Match analyst	(Italy) Marco Marino
Social Doctors	(Italy) Gian Maria Vassallo and Matteo Guelfi
Physiotherapist	(Italy) Francesco Orlando, Ottavia Maffei and Erica Dellisanti
Nutritionist	(Italy) Giacomo Carabello and Elena Marchi

== Honours ==
Eccellenza:

- Winners (1): 2019-20

== See also ==
- Genoa CFC
- Genoa CFC Youth Sector
