= Serie C (women's football) =

Women's section of professional association football league in Italy

- Founded: 2018; 8 years ago
- Country: Italy
- Confederation: UEFA
- Number of clubs: 16
- Level on pyramid: 3
- Promotion to: Serie B
- Relegation to: Eccellenza
- Domestic cup(s): Coppa Italia; Supercoppa Italiana
- Website: Official website
- Current: 2025-26

The Serie C (Italian pronunciation: [ˈsɛːrje ˈtʃi]), is the third division of women's football in Italy. Established in 2018, it has been run by the Italian Football Federation.

== Format ==
The league is divided into four groups of 12 teams for a playoff to Serie B.
