= Serie B (women's football) =

Women's section of professional association football league in Italy

- Founded: 1970; 56 years ago
- Country: Italy
- Confederation: UEFA
- Number of clubs: 16
- Promotion to: Serie A
- Relegation to: Serie C
- Domestic cup(s): Coppa Italia; Supercoppa Italiana
- Website: www.figc.it/it/femminile
- Current: 2025–26 Serie B (women)

The Serie B (Italian pronunciation: [ˈsɛːrje ˈbi]) is the second division of women's football in Italy. Established in 1970, it has been run by the Italian Football Federation and currently features 16 teams. The team which finishes Serie B in the top position is promoted directly to the Serie A, the team in the second position enters a promotion/relegation playoff with the second to last placed Serie A team, while the bottom three are relegated directly to the Serie C. Since 2015 it has been decreed by the Italian Football Federation all male Serie B teams must provide women's teams also.

== History ==
This league was created in 1970. Until 1972, it was the second and last division of women's football in Italy because it was organized by the regional committees. In 1973, it was transformed into an interregional championship and, until 2002, it was the second highest tier, equivalent to the men's Serie B. In 2002, with the creation of the new Serie A2 championship, the category became the third tier, while remaining an amateur and national category, placing itself between the A2 and the regional Serie C.

In 2011, Serie B was dissolved to make way for the A2. With the reform implemented in June 2013, Serie A2 was transformed into Serie B. From the 2013/14 season to the 2017/18 season, the championship was organized in four groups by the geographical distribution of the participating teams, while the transition to a single group was announced starting from the 2018/19 season.

Starting from the 2018/19 season, the organization of the Serie B championship, as well as that of Serie A, has been delegated to the Women's Football Division within the FIGC.

== Format ==
The Serie B championship has had different formats over the years, maintaining the division of the participating teams into several groups according to geographical distribution until the 2017/18 season. The number of groups over the years has varied from two (from 1989/90 to 1995/96) to six (2005/06). Promotion to Serie A or Serie A2 (from 2003 to 2011) was assigned either to the winners of the individual groups or via special play-offs.

In the years in which Serie B was the third tier of Italian football, the league format consisted of four or five groups of 12 teams each on average. The first in each group were promoted to Serie A2, while the bottom three teams were relegated to Serie C, the organization of which was entrusted to the Regional Committees of the Italian Football Federation (FIGC). For the 2010/11 season, the format had been changed in view of the dissolution of the division: 33 teams divided into three groups of 12 (group A), 11 (group B) and 10 teams (group C), with 14 promotions divided as follows: the first 4 of each group, plus two winners of the play-offs between fifth and sixth of groups A and B. Only 3 teams were relegated to Serie C, i.e. the bottom of each group.

From the 2013/14 season to the 2017/18 season, the teams were divided into 4 groups according to geographical distribution. The first team in each group (4 teams in total) were promoted to Serie A and the bottom two were relegated to Serie C.

In the 2018/19 and 2019/20 seasons, there were 12 participating teams playing in one group with round-trip matches for a total of 22 matchdays. The top two teams are promoted to Serie A. The teams in the last two positions are relegated directly to Serie C. The teams in ninth and tenth place play a play-out, on neutral ground in a single match, against the two teams in Serie C who lost the promotion play-offs, for another two places in Serie B. In the 2020/21 season, the number of participating teams was increased to 14, while the total number of matchdays rose to 26. The number of teams promoted to Serie A remained at two, while the bottom 4 were relegated to Serie C.

== Clubs ==
=== 2025–26 season ===
The following fourteen clubs competed in the 2025–26 season.

| Teams | Home city |
|---|---|
| Como | Como |
| Lumezzane | Lumezzane |
| Cesena | Cesena |
| Donna Roma | Rome |
| Bologna | Bologna |
| Freedom | Cuneo |
| Vicenza | Vicenza |
| Brescia | Brescia |
| Frosinone | Frosinone |
| San Marino Academy | San Marino |
| Arezzo | Arezzo |
| Hellas Verona | Verona |
| Trastevere | Rome |
| Venezia | Venice |

== Promoted teams ==
=== Promoted to Serie A ===
| Season | Winners | Runners-up |
|---|---|---|
| 1970 | Autoroma Bergamo | Messina |
| 1971 | | |
| 1972 | | |
| 1973 | Valdobbiadene, Alaska | |
| 1974 | Tepa Sport Orzinuovi | Perugia |
| 1975 | Cibus Cazzago San Martino | Sampierdarenese |
| 1976 | Salernitana | Pordenone |
| 1977 | Jolly Catania | Pulivapor Piacenza |
| 1978 | Libertas | Belluno |

| Season | Girone A | Girone B | Girone C | Girone D |
|---|---|---|---|---|
| **1979** | Tigullio 72 | Fiammamonza | Cagliari | Alaska |
| **1980** | Piacenza | Aurora Bergamo | Giugliano | |

| Season | Winners | Runners-up |
|---|---|---|
| **1981** | Arredamenti Soresina | ACF Trani 80 |
| **1982** | Spifa Galliera | Gioventù Sommese |
| **1983** | Alba Pavona Crismatours | Aurora Bergamo |

| Season | Girone A | Girone B | Girone C | Girone D |
|---|---|---|---|---|
| **1984**^{[a]} | **Juventus Torino** | Gorgonzola | Brina Foggia | |
| **1985**^{[a]} | Padova | Prato | **Urbe Tevere** | |
| **1985/86** | Reggiana, Torino | Fiamma Juve Siderno, Milan 82 | | |
| **1986/87** | ACF Milan | Carrara | Sommese | |
| **1987/88** | Verona | A.C.F. Firenze | Gravina | |
| **1988/89** | Aurora Bergamo | Il Delfino | Endas Azzurra | |
| **1989/90** | Torres, Derthona Valmacca | Gravina | | |
| **1990/91** | Aurora Bergamo, Juventus Torino | Fiamma Bari | | |
| **1991/92** | G.E.A.S. Sesto San Giovanni, Bologna | Agliana | | |
| **1992/93** | Riva, Carrara | ACF Napoli | | |
| **1993/94** | ACF Milan | Pisa, Gravina Puglia | | |
| **1994/95** | Cascine Vica | Picenum | | |
| **1995/96** | Calendasco, Sporting Segrate 92 | Modena | | |
| **1996/97** | Sarzana | Hellas Verona | DIDDL Sporting Sorrento | |
| **1997/98** | G.E.A.S. Ambrosiana | Bologna | Gravina | |
| **1998/99**^{[b]} | **Tradate** | **Foroni Verona** | **Attilia Nuoro** | Aquile Bagheria |
| **1999/00** | Fiammamonza | Atletico Oristano | Aquile Bagheria | |
| **2000/01**^{[b]} | **Como** | **Tavagnacco** | Grigo Perugia | **Palermo** |
| **2001/02**^{[b]} | **Bergamo R** | Mantova | **Lucca 7** | Matese Bojano |

^{1} The winners of Serie B are indicated in bold.
^{2} The teams promoted to Serie A are indicated in bold.

=== Promoted to Serie A2 ===
| Season | Girone A | Girone B | Girone C | Girone D | Girone E | Girone F |
|---|---|---|---|---|---|---|
| **2001/02**^{[a]} | **Bergamo R**, Vallassinese, Tradate | Mantova, Venezia, Gordige | **Lucca 7**, Olbia, Reggiana | Matese Bojano, Aquile Bagheria, Sporting Casalnuovo | | |
| **2002/03** | Atalanta, Segratese, Matuziana Sanremo | Trento, Vicenza, Tenelo Club Rivignano | Grifo Perugia, Firenze, Cervia | Termoli, Autoscuola Puccio Palermo, Olimpica Corigliano | | |
| **2003/04** | Piossasco | Porto Mantovano | Montale 2000 | Matese Bojano | | |
| **2004/05** | Sampierdarenese | Chiasiellis | Riozzese | Sezze | Orlandia 97 | |
| **2005/06** | Pisa | Aurora Bergamo | Barcon | Rovezzano 90 | Nuova Bari | Sport Napoli |
| **2006/07** | Brescia | Graphistudio Pordenone | Cervia | Vis Francavilla Fontana | Roma | |
| **2007/08** | Montale 2000 | ChievoVerona | Gordige | Lazio | Napoli | |
| **2008/09** | Alessandria | Südtirol | Siena | Sezze | | |
| **2009/10** | Multedo | Exto Schio 06 | Imolese | Marsala | | |
| **2010/11** | Gordige, Inter Milano, Real Meda, Orobica, Vittorio Veneto | San Zaccaria, Packcenter Imola, Bogliasco Pieve, Castelvecchio, Villacidro Villgomme | Aquile Bagheria, RES Roma, Camaleonte, Eurnova | | | |
| **2011/12** | Gordige, Inter Milano, Real Meda, Orobica, Vittorio Veneto | San Zaccaria, Packcenter Imola, Bogliasco Pieve, Castelvecchio, Villacidro Villgomme | Aquile Bagheria, RES Roma, Camaleonte, Eurnova | | | |

^{1} The teams promoted to Serie A are indicated in bold.

=== Promoted to Serie A ===
| Season | Girone A | Girone B | Girone C | Girone D |
|---|---|---|---|---|
| **2013/14** | Cuneo | Orobica | San Zaccaria | Pink Bari |
| **2014/15** | Luserna | Südtirol | Vittorio Veneto | Acese |
| **2015/16** | Como | Jesina | Cuneo | Chieti |
| **2016/17** | Empoli | Sassuolo | ChievoVerona Valpo | Pink Bari |
| **2017/18**^{[a]} | **Florentia** | **Orobica** | Pro San Bonifacio | Roma |

| Season | Winners | Runners-up | 3rd place |
|---|---|---|---|
| **2018/19** | Inter Milan | Empoli | |
| **2019/20** | Napoli | San Marino Academy | |
| **2020/21** | Lazio | Pomigliano | |
| **2021/22**^{[a]} | **Como** | Brescia | |
| **2022/23**^{[a]} | **Napoli** | Lazio | |
| **2023/24**^{[a]} | **Lazio** | **Ternana** | |
| **2024/25** | **Ternana** | **Parma** | **Genoa** |
| **2025/26** | **Como 1907** | Lumezzane | |

^{1} The teams promoted to Serie A are indicated in bold.
