= Italy women's national football team results (2020–present) =

The Italy women's national football team represents Italy in international women's association football and is controlled by the Italian Football Federation.

Italy participated at the 2020 Algarve Cup in Portugal: after beating the hosts 2–1 in the qualification round, Italy qualified to the semi-finals, where they beat New Zealand 3–0. Italy could not participate in the final for COVID-19 travel-related issues, and Germany won the competition by default. In the qualifiers for the UEFA Women's Euro 2022, which were played between 2019 and 2021, Italy were drawn with Denmark, Bosnia and Herzegovina, Malta, Israel, and Georgia. Italy finished in second place in their group, winning all games except a draw and a defeat to Denmark, and qualified to the final tournament.

== Key ==
Key to matches

- Att.=Match attendance
- (H)=Home ground
- (A)=Away ground
- (N)=Neutral ground

Key to record by opponent

- Pld=Games played
- W=Games won
- D=Games drawn
- L=Games lost
- GF=Goals for
- GA=Goals against

== Results ==
Italy's score is shown first in each case.

Date	Venue	Opponents	Score	Competition	Italy scorers	Att.	Ref.
4 March 2020	Estádio Algarve, Faro/Loulé (N)	Portugal	2–1	2020 Algarve Cup	Linari, Girelli	0	
7 March 2020	Vista Municipal Stadium, Parchal (N)	New Zealand	3–0	2020 Algarve Cup	Girelli, Bonansea, Tarenzi	0	
11 March 2020	Vista Municipal Stadium, Parchal (N)	Germany	–	2020 Algarve Cup		—	
22 September 2020	Bosnia and Herzegovina FA Training Centre, Zenica (A)	Bosnia and Herzegovina	5–0	UEFA Women's Euro 2022 qualifying	Galli, Girelli (3), Linari	0	
27 October 2020	Stadio Carlo Castellani, Empoli (H)	Denmark	1–3	UEFA Women's Euro 2022 qualifying	Giacinti	0	
1 December 2020	Viborg Stadium, Viborg (A)	Denmark	0–0	UEFA Women's Euro 2022 qualifying		0	
24 February 2021	Stadio Artemio Franchi, Florence (H)	Israel	12–0	UEFA Women's Euro 2022 qualifying	Giacinti (2), Bonansea (2), David (o.g.), Girelli, Salvai, Rosucci, Sabatino (2), Caruso, Giugliano	0	
10 April 2021	Campo Enzo Bearzot, Coverciano (H)	Iceland	1–0	Exhibition game	Caruso	0	
13 April 2021	Campo Enzo Bearzot, Coverciano (H)	Iceland	1–1	Exhibition game	Giacinti	0	
10 June 2021	Stadio Paolo Mazza, Ferrara (H)	Netherlands	1–0	Exhibition game	Girelli	0	
14 June 2021	Stadion Wiener Neustadt, Wiener Neustadt (A)	Austria	3–2	Exhibition game	Soffia (2), Linari	0	
17 September 2021	Stadio Nereo Rocco, Trieste (H)	Moldova	3–0	2023 FIFA Women's World Cup qualification	Girelli (2), Giacinti		
21 September 2021	Stadion Branko Čavlović-Čavlek, Karlovac (A)	Croatia	5–0	2023 FIFA Women's World Cup qualification	Gama, Giacinti (2), Girelli, Cernoia		
22 October 2021	Stadio Teofilo Patini, Castel di Sangro (H)	Croatia	3–0	2023 FIFA Women's World Cup qualification	Cernoia, Girelli, Pirone		
26 October 2021	LFF Stadium, Vilnius (A)	Lithuania	5–0	2023 FIFA Women's World Cup qualification	Cernoia, Pirone, Giacinti, Gama, Caruso		
26 November 2021	Palermo, Stadio Renzo Barbera (H)	Switzerland	1–2	2023 FIFA Women's World Cup qualification	Bonansea		
30 November 2021	Stadionul Anghel Iordănescu, Voluntari (A)	Romania	5–0	2023 FIFA Women's World Cup qualification	Cernoia, Girelli (3), Pirone		
16 February 2022	Estádio Municipal de Lagos, Lagos (N)	Denmark	1–0	2022 Algarve Cup	Bonansea		
20 February 2022	Estádio Algarve, Algarve (N)	Norway	2–1	2022 Algarve Cup	Giacinti, Caruso		
23 February 2022	Estádio Municipal de Lagos, Lagos (N)	Sweden	1–1	2022 Algarve Cup	Giacinti		
8 April 2022	Stadio Ennio Tardini, Parma (H)	Lithuania	7–0	2023 FIFA Women's World Cup qualification	Caruso 2, Bergamaschi 2, Cernoia, Sabatino, Bonetti		
12 April 2022	Stockhorn Arena, Thun (A)	Switzerland	1–0	2023 FIFA Women's World Cup qualification	Girelli		
1 July 2022	Stadio Teofilo Patini, Castel di Sangro (H)	Spain	1–1	Exhibition game	Bergamaschi		
10 July 2022	New York Stadium, Rotherham (N)	France	1–5	UEFA Women's Euro 2022	Piemonte		
14 July 2022	New York Stadium, Rotherham (N)	Iceland	1–1	UEFA Women's Euro 2022	Bergamaschi		
18 July 2022	Manchester City Academy Stadium, Manchester (N)	Belgium	0–1	UEFA Women's Euro 2022			
2 September 2022	Zimbru Stadium, Chișinău (A)	Moldova	8–0	2023 FIFA Women's World Cup qualification	Giugliano, Giacinti 2, Caruso 4, Bonfantini		
6 September 2022	Stadio Paolo Mazza, Ferrara (H)	Romania	2–0	2023 FIFA Women's World Cup qualification	Giacinti, Boattin		
10 October 2022	Stadio Teofilo Patini, Castel di Sangro (H)	Brazil	0–1	Exhibition game			
11 November 2022	Luigi Ferraris Stadium, Genoa (H)	Austria	0–1	Exhibition game			
15 November 2022	Belfast (A)	Northern Ireland	0–1	Exhibition game			
16 February 2023	Stadium MK, Milton Keynes	Belgium	1–2	2023 Arnold Clark Cup	Giugliano	8,705	
19 February 2023	Coventry Building Society Arena, Coventry	England	1–2	2023 Arnold Clark Cup	Cantore	32,128	
22 February 2023	Ashton Gate Stadium, Bristol	South Korea	2–1	2023 Arnold Clark Cup	Caruso, Rosucci	6,938	
24 July 2023	Eden Park, Auckland (N)	Argentina	1–0	2023 FIFA Women's World Cup	Girelli	30,889	
29 July 2023	Wellington Regional Stadium, Wellington (N)	Sweden	0–5	2023 FIFA Women's World Cup		29,143	
2 August 2023	Wellington Regional Stadium, Wellington (N)	South Africa	2–3	2023 FIFA Women's World Cup	Caruso (2)	14,967	

Notes

1. A: Match played behind closed doors due to the COVID-19 pandemic in Europe.
2. B: Italy withdrew from the Algarve Cup final due to the COVID-19 pandemic.
3. C: Italy lost 6–5 after penalty shoot-out

== Record by opponent ==
Team	Pld	W	D	L	GF	GA	GD	WPCT
Austria	1	1	0	0	3	2	+1	100.00
Bosnia and Herzegovina	1	1	0	0	5	0	+5	100.00
Croatia	2	2	0	0	8	0	+8	100.00
Denmark	3	1	1	1	2	3	−1	33.33
Iceland	2	1	1	0	2	1	+1	50.00
Israel	1	1	0	0	12	0	+12	100.00
Lithuania	1	1	0	0	5	0	+5	100.00
Moldova	1	1	0	0	3	0	+3	100.00
Netherlands	1	1	0	0	1	0	+1	100.00
New Zealand	1	1	0	0	3	0	+3	100.00
Norway	1	1	0	0	2	1	+1	100.00
Portugal	1	1	0	0	2	1	+1	100.00
Romania	1	1	0	0	5	0	+5	100.00
Sweden	1	0	1	0	1	1	0	0.00
Switzerland	1	0	0	1	1	2	−1	0.00
Total	19	14	3	2	55	11	+44	73.68

Source: Results
