= 2021–22 in Swiss football =

Football in Switzerland
- Season: 2021–22

Men's football
- Super League: Zürich
- Challenge League: Winterthur
- Swiss Cup: Lugano

Women's football
- Swiss Women's Super League: Zürich
- Swiss Cup: Zürich

The following is a summary of the 2021–22 season of competitive football in Switzerland.

== National teams ==
=== Men's national team ===
==== 2022 FIFA World Cup qualification ====
Pos	Team	Pld	W	D	L	GF	GA	GD	Pts	Qualification	Switzerland	Italy		Bulgaria	Lithuania
1	Switzerland	8	5	3	0	15	2	+13	18	Qualification for 2022 FIFA World Cup	—	0–0	2–0	4–0	1–0
2	Italy	8	4	4	0	13	2	+11	16	Advance to play-offs	1–1	—	2–0	1–1	5–0
3	Northern Ireland	8	2	3	3	6	7	−1	9		0–0	0–0	—	0–0	1–0
4	Bulgaria	8	2	2	4	6	14	−8	8		1–3	0–2	2–1	—	1–0
5	Lithuania	8	1	0	7	4	19	−15	3		0–4	0–2	1–4	3–1	—

Source: FIFA, UEFA
Rules for classification: Tiebreakers

5 September 2021 Group C	Switzerland	0–0	Italy	Basel, Switzerland
20:45 CET		Report		Stadium: St. Jakob-Park; Attendance: 31,500; Referee: Carlos del Cerro Grande (Spain)

8 September 2021 Group C	Northern Ireland	0–0	Switzerland	Belfast, Northern Ireland
20:45 CET		Report		Stadium: Windsor Park; Attendance: 15,660; Referee: Harald Lechner (Austria)

9 October 2021 Group C	Switzerland	2–0	Northern Ireland	Lancy, Switzerland
20:45 CET	Zuber 45+3'; Fassnacht 90+1'	Report		Stadium: Stade de Genève; Attendance: 19,129; Referee: Slavko Vinčić (Slovenia)

12 October 2021 Group C	Lithuania	0–4	Switzerland	Vilnius, Lithuania
20:45 CET		Report	31', 45' Embolo; 42' Steffen; 90+4' Gavranović	Stadium: LFF Stadium; Attendance: 1,806; Referee: Tiago Martins (Portugal)

12 November 2021 Group C	Italy	1–1	Switzerland	Rome, Italy
20:45 UTC+1	Di Lorenzo 36'	Report	Widmer 11'	Stadium: Stadio Olimpico; Referee: Anthony Taylor (England)

15 November 2021 Group C	Switzerland	4–0	Bulgaria	Lucerne, Switzerland
20:45 UTC+1	Okafor 48'; Vargas 57'; Itten 72'; Freuler 90+1'	Report		Stadium: Swissporarena; Referee: Benoît Bastien (France)

==== Friendly matches ====
1 September 2021	Switzerland	2–1	Greece	Basel, Switzerland
TBD CET	Zuber 7'; Vargas 51'	Report	34' Pavlidis	Stadium: St. Jakob-Park; Attendance: 3,500; Referee: Antti Munukka (Finland)

26 March 2022	England	2–1	Switzerland	London, England
17:30 UTC+1	Shaw 45+1'; Kane 78' (pen.)	Report	Embolo 22'	Stadium: Wembley Stadium; Referee: Andreas Ekberg (Sweden)

29 March 2022	Switzerland	1–1	Kosovo	Zürich, Switzerland
18:00 UTC+2	Lotomba 61'	Report	Rashica 52'	Stadium: Letzigrund; Referee: Ruddy Buquet (France)

===== UEFA Nations League =====
====== Group 2 ======
Pos	Team	Pld	W	D	L	GF	GA	GD	Pts	Qualification or relegation	(Spain)	(Portugal)	(Switzerland)	(Czech Republic)
1	Spain	6	3	2	1	8	5	+3	11	Qualification for Nations League Finals	—	1–1	1–2	2–0
2	Portugal	6	3	1	2	11	3	+8	10		0–1	—	4–0	2–0
3	Switzerland	6	3	0	3	6	9	−3	9		0–1	1–0	—	2–1
4	Czech Republic (R)	6	1	1	4	5	13	−8	4	Relegation to League B	2–2	0–4	2–1	—

Source: UEFA
(R) Relegated

2 June 2022	Czech Republic	2–1	Switzerland	Prague, Czech Republic
20:45	Kuchta 11'; Sow 58' (o.g.)	Report	Okafor 44'	Stadium: Sinobo Stadium; Attendance: 12,236; Referee: Daniel Siebert (Germany)

5 June 2022	Portugal	4–0	Switzerland	Lisbon, Portugal
19:45 UTC+1	Carvalho 15'; Ronaldo 35', 39'; Cancelo 68'	Report		Stadium: Estádio José Alvalade; Attendance: 42,325; Referee: Orel Grinfeeld (Israel)

9 June 2022	Switzerland	0–1	Spain	Geneva, Switzerland
20:45 UTC+2		Report	Sarabia 13'	Stadium: Stade de Genève; Attendance: 25,875; Referee: Serdar Gözübüyük (Netherlands)

12 June 2022	Switzerland	1–0	Portugal	Stade de Genève, Geneva
20:45	Seferovic 1'	Report		Attendance: 26,300; Referee: Fran Jović (Croatia)

24 September 2022	Spain	1–2	Switzerland	La Romareda, Zaragoza
20:45	Alba 55'	Report	Akanji 21'; Embolo 59'	Attendance: 31,809; Referee: Clément Turpin (France)

27 September 2022	Switzerland	2–1	Czech Republic	Kybunpark, St. Gallen
20:45	Freuler 29'; Embolo 30'	Report	Schick 45'	Attendance: 13,353; Referee: Irfan Peljto (Bosnia and Herzegovina)

=== Women's national team ===
==== Friendlies ====
30 June 2022	Switzerland	0–4	England	Zürich, Switzerland
18:00 (CEST)	Calligaris (yellow card) 44'	Report	Russo (yellow card) 45+1', (goal) 56'; Stanway (yellow card) 69', (goal) 74' (pen.); England 76'; Scott 90+4'	Stadium: Letzigrund; Attendance: 10,022; Referee: Ainara Andrea Acevedo Dudley (Spain)

==== 2023 FIFA Women's World Cup qualification ====
Pos	Team	Pld	W	D	L	GF	GA	GD	Pts	Qualification	(Italy)	(Switzerland)	(Romania)	(Croatia)	(Lithuania)	(Moldova)
1	Italy	10	9	0	1	40	2	+38	27	2023 FIFA Women's World Cup	—	1–2	2–0	3–0	7–0	3–0
2	Switzerland	10	8	1	1	44	4	+40	25	Play-offs	0–1	—	2–0	5–0	4–1	15–0
3	Romania	10	6	1	3	21	11	+10	19		0–5	1–1	—	2–0	3–0	3–0
4	Croatia	10	3	1	6	6	18	−12	10		0–5	0–2	0–1	—	0–0	4–0
5	Lithuania	10	1	2	7	7	35	−28	5		0–5	0–7	1–7	0–1	—	4–0
6	Moldova	10	0	1	9	1	49	−48	1		0–8	0–6	0–4	0–1	1–1	—

Source: UEFA
Rules for classification: Tiebreakers

17 September 2021 Group G	Switzerland	4–1	Lithuania	Thun, Switzerland
19:00 CET	Lehmann 15'; Sow 33'; Bachmann 65'; Fölmli 90+2'	Report	50' Jonušaitė	Stadium: Stockhorn Arena; Attendance: 2,000; Referee: Victoria Beyer (France)

21 September 2021 Group G	Moldova	0–6	Switzerland	Chișinău, Moldova
19:00 CET		Report	39' (pen.) Crnogorčević; 41' Sow; 42' Humm; 44' Fölmli; 52' Xhemaili; 87' Lehmann	Stadium: Zimbru Stadium; Referee: Anastasiya Romanyuk (Ukraine)

22 October 2021 Group G	Switzerland	2–0	Romania	Zürich, Switzerland
19:00 CET	Crnogorčević 48', 90' (pen.)	Report		Stadium: Letzigrund; Referee: Riem Hussein (Germany)

26 October 2021 Group G	Switzerland	5–0	Croatia	Zürich, Switzerland
19:00 CET	Crnogorčević 8'; Maritz 45+2'; Bachmann 82', 90+1' (pen.); Rinast 88'	Report		Stadium: Letzigrund; Referee: Frida Nielsen (Denmark)

26 November 2021 Group G	Italy	1–2	Switzerland	Stadio Renzo Barbera, Palermo
17:30	Bonansea 60'	Report (FIFA); Report (UEFA)	Sow 9'; Crnogorčević 20'	Referee: Stéphanie Frappart (France)

30 November 2021 Group G	Lithuania	0–7	Switzerland	LFF Stadium, Vilnius
17:30 (18:30 EET)		Report (FIFA); Report (UEFA)	Sow 3', 31', 37'; Kiwic 12'; Crnogorčević 34'; Xhemaili 40'; Fölmli 61'	Referee: Zoe Stavrou (Cyprus)

8 April 2022 Group G	Romania	1–1	Switzerland	Stadionul Arcul de Triumf, Bucharest
18:45 (19:45 EEST)	Ficzay 42'	Report (FIFA); Report (UEFA)	Kiwic 77'	Referee: Marta Huerta de Aza (Spain)

12 April 2022 Group G	Switzerland	0–1	Italy	Stockhorn Arena, Thun
17:45		Report (FIFA); Report (UEFA)	Girelli 83'	Referee: Rebecca Welch (England)

== League season ==
=== Men ===
==== Credit Suisse Super League ====
Pos	Team	Pld	W	D	L	GF	GA	GD	Pts	Qualification or relegation
1	Zürich (C)	36	23	7	6	78	46	+32	76	Qualification for Champions League second qualifying round
2	Basel	36	15	17	4	70	41	+29	62	Qualification for Europa Conference League second qualifying round
3	Young Boys	36	16	12	8	80	50	+30	60	Qualification for Europa Conference League second qualifying round
4	Lugano	36	16	6	14	50	54	−4	54	Qualification for Europa Conference League third qualifying round (Note: Lugano qualified for the Europa Conference League third qualifying round as the 2021–22 Swiss Cup champions.)
5	St. Gallen	36	14	8	14	68	63	+5	50	
6	Servette	36	12	8	16	50	66	−16	44	
7	Sion	36	11	8	17	46	67	−21	41	
8	Grasshopper	36	9	13	14	54	58	−4	40	
9	Luzern (O)	36	9	13	14	52	64	−12	40	Qualification for Relegation play-offs
10	Lausanne-Sport (R)	36	4	10	22	37	76	−39	22	Relegation to Swiss Challenge League

Source: Swiss Super League
Rules for classification: 1) Points; 2) Goal difference; 3) Goals scored; 4) Head-to-head goal difference; 5) Away goals scored; 6) Draw.
(C) Champions; (O) Play-off winners; (R) Relegated

==== Challenge League ====
Pos	Team	Pld	W	D	L	GF	GA	GD	Pts	Promotion or relegation
1	Winterthur (C, P)	36	18	11	7	76	45	+31	65	Promotion to Swiss Super League
2	Schaffhausen	36	19	8	9	73	49	+24	65	Qualified for the Promotion play-offs
3	Aarau	36	20	5	11	67	47	+20	65	
4	Vaduz	36	18	6	12	68	58	+10	60	Qualification for the Europa Conference League second qualifying round (Note: Vaduz qualified for the Europa Conference League second qualifying round by winning the 2021–22 Liechtenstein Cup.)
5	Thun	36	17	5	14	62	57	+5	56	
6	Xamax	36	14	8	14	56	54	+2	50	
7	Lausanne-Ouchy	36	12	8	16	46	50	−4	44	
8	Yverdon	36	11	11	14	44	52	−8	44	
9	Wil	36	11	8	17	68	80	−12	41	
10	Kriens (R)	36	3	4	29	25	93	−68	13	Relegation to Swiss Promotion League

Source: Swiss Challenge League
Rules for classification: 1) Points; 2) Goal difference; 3) Goals scored; 4) Head-to-head goal difference; 5) Away goals scored; 6) Draw.
(C) Champions; (P) Promoted; (R) Relegated

==== Swiss Cup ====
15 May 2022	FC Lugano	4–1	FC St. Gallen	Bern
14:00	Celar 5'; Custodio 44'; Bottani 58'; Haile-Selassie 70'	Report	Maglica 21'	Stadium: Stadion Wankdorf; Attendance: 28,500; Referee: Urs Schnyder

=== Women ===
==== AXA Women's Super League ====
Pos	Team	Pld	W	D	L	GF	GA	GD	Pts	Qualification or relegation	SFC	ZUR	GCZ	BAS	STG	LUZ	YBF	AAR	YVE	LUG
1	Servette FC Chênois Féminin (Q)	18	15	1	2	44	9	+35	46	UWCL Round 1 and Playoffs		1–1	0–2	3–0	5–0	1–0	2–1	2–0	6–0	3–1
2	FC Zürich Frauen	18	14	2	2	65	13	+52	44	Advance to Playoffs	2–1		2–0	2–0	1–0	4–0	7–0	4–1	6–0	7–0
3	Grasshopper Club Zürich	18	12	1	5	49	22	+27	37	Advance to Playoffs	0–2	1–0		2–4	0–0	4–2	8–0	3–0	5–0	2–0
4	FC Basel 1893	18	11	2	5	40	20	+20	35	Advance to Playoffs	0–2	3–3	7–0		1–2	1–0	3–1	1–0	0–0	2–0
5	FC St. Gallen-Staad	18	11	2	5	37	19	+18	35	Advance to Playoffs	0–3	1–3	2–0	2–2		4–0	1–0	5–0	3–1	3–0
6	FC Luzern	18	7	2	9	32	32	0	23	Advance to Playoffs	0–1	2–3	2–4	1–3	2–1		3–0	3–1	2–1	5–1
7	BSC YB Frauen	18	6	1	11	21	51	−30	19	Advance to Playoffs	0–3	0–5	1–8	1–0	0–2	2–2		2–3	2–1	3–0
8	FC Aarau Frauen	18	4	3	11	18	36	−18	15	Advance to Playoffs	1–2	2–1	0–2	0–3	1–3	1–1	2–3		3–0	1–1
9	FC Yverdon Féminin	18	2	0	16	10	63	−53	6	Relegation Playoff	1–4	1–8	0–5	0–4	0–4	0–3	1–3	0–2		2–0
10	FC Lugano Femminile (R)	18	0	2	16	3	54	−51	2	Relegation to 2022-23 Nationalliga B (Note: FC Lugano Femminile withdrew from the Axa Women's Super League and are relegated directly, without going through the relegation playoff.)	0–3	0–6	0–3	0–3	0–4	0–4	0–2	0–0	0–1	

Source: Meisterschaft
Legend: Blue = home team win; Yellow = draw; Red = away team win.
Rules for classification: 1) Points; 2) Goal difference; 3) Goals scored; 4) Head-to-head goal difference; 5) Away goals scored; 6) Draw.
(Q) Qualified for the phase indicated; (R) Relegated
Notes:

Quarter-finals
Servette	1	4	5
FC Aarau	0	0	0
Basel	3	4	7
St. Gallen-Staad	0	1	1
Grasshopper	5	3	8
Luzern	2	3	5
Zürich	2	7	9
Young Boys	1	0	1

Semi-finals
Servette (a.e.t.) (p)	0	2	2 (4)
Basel	2	0	2 (3)
Grasshopper	0	0	0
Zürich	1	3	4

Final
Servette	2	(4)
Zürich (a.e.t.) (p)	2	(5)

== Swiss clubs in Europe ==
=== UEFA Champions League ===
==== Qualifying phase and play-off round ====
===== Second qualifying round =====
Team 1	Agg.	Team 2	1st leg	2nd leg
Slovan Bratislava (Slovakia)	2–3	(Switzerland) Young Boys	0–0	2–3

===== Third qualifying round =====
Team 1	Agg.	Team 2	1st leg	2nd leg
CFR Cluj (Romania)	2–4	(Switzerland) Young Boys	1–1	1–3

===== Play-off round =====
Team 1	Agg.	Team 2	1st leg	2nd leg
Young Boys (Switzerland)	6–4	(Hungary) Ferencváros	3–2	3–2

==== Group stage ====
Pos	Team	Pld	W	D	L	GF	GA	GD	Pts	Qualification	MUN	VIL	ATA	YB
1	(England) Manchester United	6	3	2	1	11	8	+3	11	Advance to knockout phase	—	2–1	3–2	1–1
2	(Spain) Villarreal	6	3	1	2	12	9	+3	10	Advance to knockout phase	0–2	—	2–2	2–0
3	(Italy) Atalanta	6	1	3	2	12	13	−1	6	Transfer to Europa League	2–2	2–3	—	1–0
4	(Switzerland) Young Boys	6	1	2	3	7	12	−5	5		2–1	1–4	3–3	—

Source: UEFA
Rules for classification: Group stage tiebreakers

=== UEFA Europa Conference League ===
==== Qualifying phase and play-off round ====
===== Second qualifying round =====
Team 1	Agg.	Team 2	1st leg	2nd leg
Basel (Switzerland)	5–0	(Albania) Partizani	3–0	2–0
Molde (Norway)	3–2	(Switzerland) Servette	3–0	0–2

===== Third qualifying round =====
Team 1	Agg.	Team 2	1st leg	2nd leg
Újpest (Hungary)	1–6	(Switzerland) Basel	1–2	0–4
Luzern (Switzerland)	0–6	(Netherlands) Feyenoord	0–3	0–3

===== Third qualifying round =====
Team 1	Agg.	Team 2	1st leg	2nd leg
Basel (Switzerland)	4–4 (4–3 p)	(Sweden) Hammarby IF	3–1	1–3 (a.e.t.)

==== Group stage – Group H ====
Pos	Team	Pld	W	D	L	GF	GA	GD	Pts	Qualification	BAS	QAR	OMO	KAI
1	(Switzerland) Basel	6	4	2	0	14	6	+8	14	Advance to round of 16	—	3–0	3–1	4–2
2	(Azerbaijan) Qarabağ	6	3	2	1	10	8	+2	11	Advance to knockout round play-offs	0–0	—	2–2	2–1
3	(Cyprus) Omonia	6	0	4	2	5	10	−5	4		1–1	1–4	—	0–0
4	(Kazakhstan) Kairat	6	0	2	4	6	11	−5	2		2–3	1–2	0–0	—

Source: UEFA
Rules for classification: Group stage tiebreakers

=== UEFA Women's Champions League ===
==== Qualifying rounds ====
===== Round 1 =====
Hosted by Åland United.

Semi-finals
18 August
(Switzerland) Servette Chênois	1
(Northern Ireland) Glentoran	0
18 August
(Romania) Olimpia Cluj	0
(Finland) Åland United	4

Final
21 August
(Switzerland) Servette Chênois	1
(Finland) Åland United	0
Third place
21 August
(Romania) Olimpia Cluj	0
(Northern Ireland) Glentoran	2

Hosted by Zürich.

Semi-finals
17 August
(Germany) 1899 Hoffenheim	1
(Iceland) Valur	0
17 August
(Switzerland) Zürich	1
(Italy) Milan	2

Final
20 August
(Germany) 1899 Hoffenheim	2
(Italy) Milan	0
Third place
20 August
(Switzerland) Zürich	1
(Iceland) Valur	3

===== Round 2 =====
Team 1	Agg.	Team 2	1st leg	2nd leg
Servette Chênois (Switzerland)	3–2	(Scotland) Glasgow City	1–1	2–1

==== Group stage ====
Pos	Team	Pld	W	D	L	GF	GA	GD	Pts	Qualification	WOL	JUV	CHE	SER
1	(Germany) VfL Wolfsburg	6	3	2	1	17	7	+10	11 (Note: Head-to-head points: Wolfsburg 5, Juventus 5, Chelsea 5. Head-to-head goal differences: Wolfsburg +2, Juventus +1, Chelsea −3.)	Advance to Quarter-finals	—	0–2	4–0	5–0
2	(Italy) Juventus	6	3	2	1	12	4	+8	11	Advance to Quarter-finals	2–2	—	1–2	4–0
3	(England) Chelsea	6	3	2	1	13	8	+5	11		3–3	0–0	—	1–0
4	(Switzerland) Servette Chênois	6	0	0	6	0	23	−23	0		0–3	0–3	0–7	—

Source: UEFA
Rules for classification: Group stage tiebreakers

== Notes ==
Preceded by 2019–20	Seasons in Swiss football	Succeeded by 2022–23
