= 2023 FIFA Women's World Cup qualification – UEFA Group G =

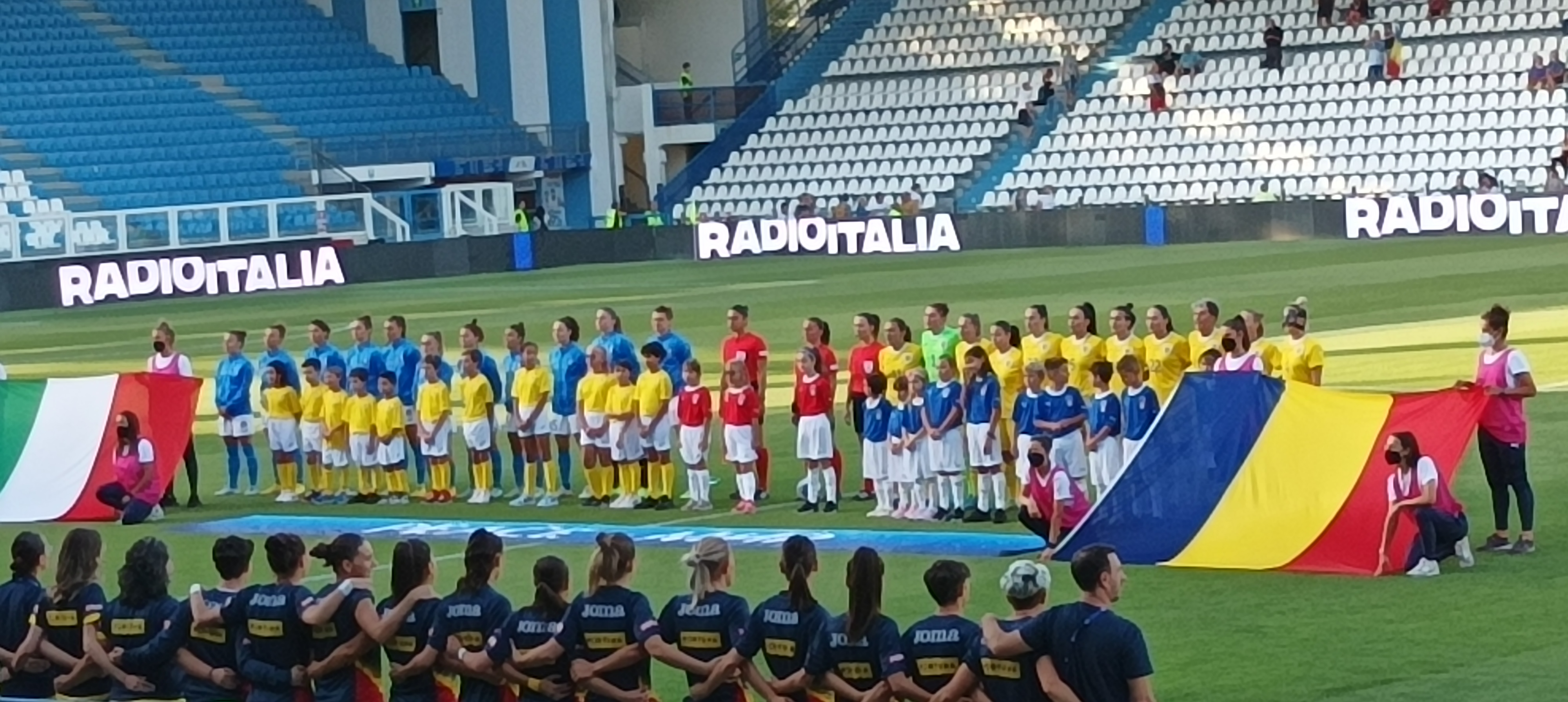
National teams of Romania and Italy (0 : 5) 2022.

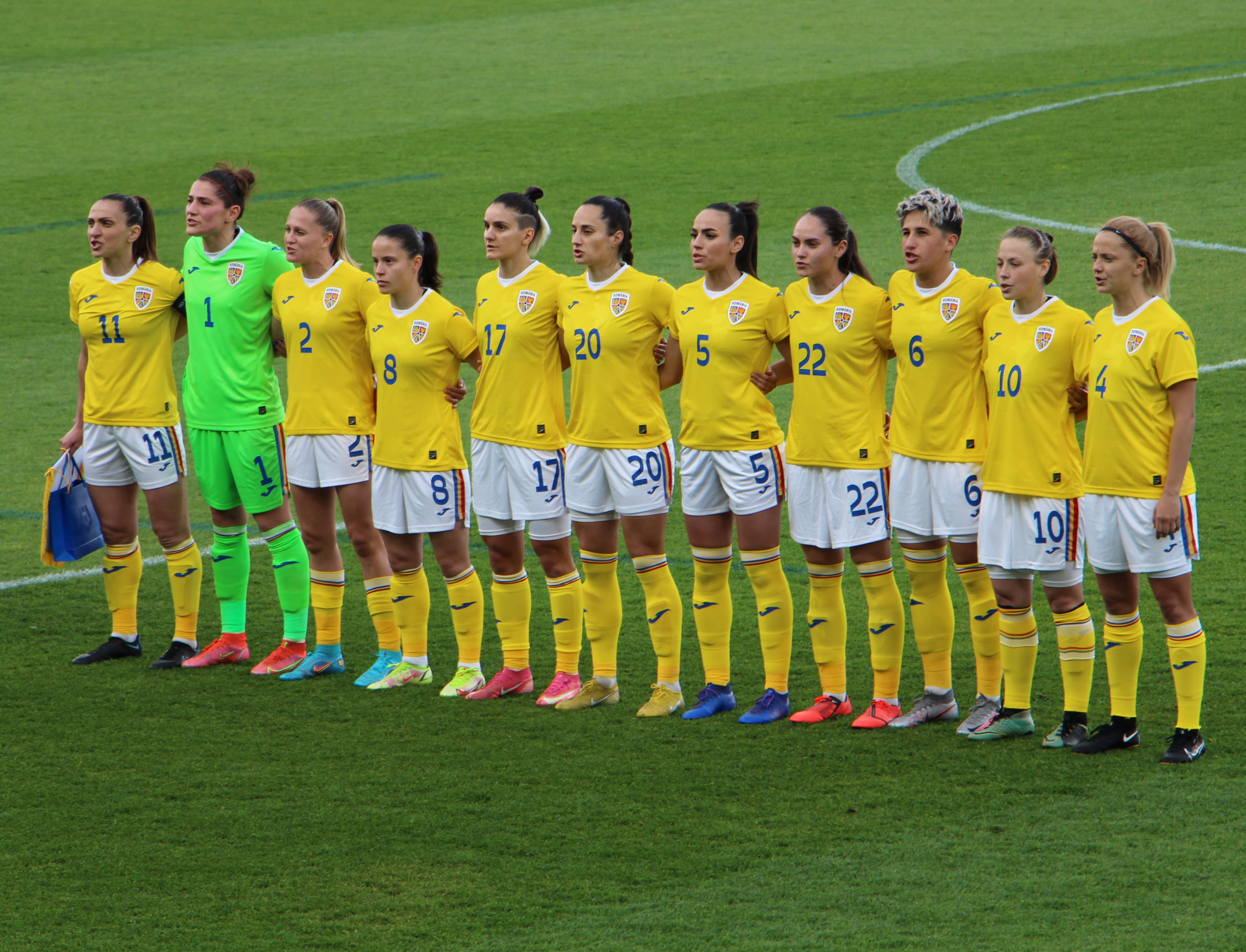
National team of Romania, 2022.

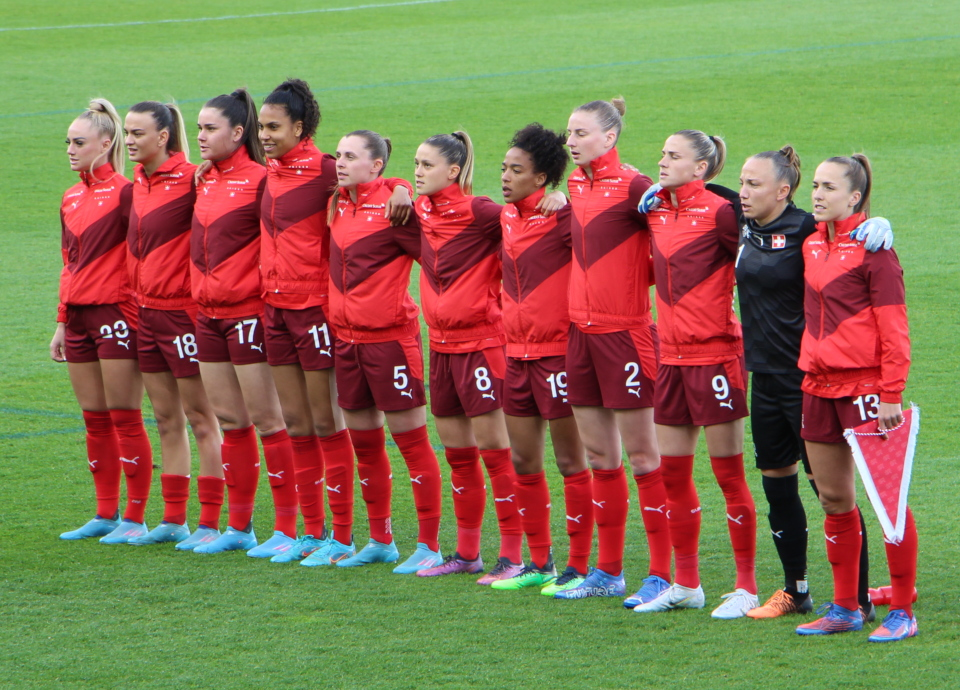
Swiss national team 2022.

UEFA Group G of the 2023 FIFA Women's World Cup qualification competition consists of six teams: Italy, Switzerland, Romania, Croatia, Moldova, and Lithuania. The composition of the nine groups in the qualifying group stage was decided by the draw held on 30 April 2021, with the teams seeded according to their coefficient ranking.

The group is played in home-and-away round-robin format between 17 September 2021 and 6 September 2022, with a pause for the Women's Euro 2022 in July. The group winners qualify for the final tournament, while the runners-up advance to the play-offs first round if they are one of the other six runners-up among all nine groups (not counting results against the sixth-placed team).

== Standings ==
Pos	Team	Pld	W	D	L	GF	GA	GD	Pts	Qualification	(Italy)	(Switzerland)	(Romania)	(Croatia)	(Lithuania)	(Moldova)
1	Italy	10	9	0	1	40	2	+38	27	2023 FIFA Women's World Cup	—	1–2	2–0	3–0	7–0	3–0
2	Switzerland	10	8	1	1	44	4	+40	25	Play-offs	0–1	—	2–0	5–0	4–1	15–0
3	Romania	10	6	1	3	21	11	+10	19		0–5	1–1	—	2–0	3–0	3–0
4	Croatia	10	3	1	6	6	18	−12	10		0–5	0–2	0–1	—	0–0	4–0
5	Lithuania	10	1	2	7	7	35	−28	5		0–5	0–7	1–7	0–1	—	4–0
6	Moldova	10	0	1	9	1	49	−48	1		0–8	0–6	0–4	0–1	1–1	—

Source: UEFA
Rules for classification: Tiebreakers

== Matches ==
Times are CET/CEST, (Note: CEST (UTC+2) for dates between 28 March and 31 October 2021 and between 27 March and 30 October 2022, and CET (UTC+1) for all other dates.) as listed by UEFA (local times, if different, are in parentheses).

17 September 2021
17:30

Italy	3–0	Moldova
Girelli 16', 28' (pen.); Giacinti 35'	Report (FIFA); Report (UEFA)

Stadio Nereo Rocco, Trieste
Attendance: 1,266
Referee: Lorraine Watson (Scotland)
17 September 2021
19:00

Switzerland	4–1	Lithuania
Lehmann 15'; Sow 33'; Bachmann 65'; Fölmli 90+2'	Report (FIFA); Report (UEFA)	Jonušaitė 50'

Stockhorn Arena, Thun
Attendance: 2,071
Referee: Victoria Beyer (France)
17 September 2021
19:30

Romania	2–0	Croatia
Rus 12'; Carp 32'	Report (FIFA); Report (UEFA)

Stadionul Mogoșoaia, Mogoșoaia
Referee: Lizzy Van Der Helm (Netherlands)

21 September 2021
17:30

Croatia	0–5	Italy
	Report (FIFA); Report (UEFA)	Gama 17'; Giacinti 31', 47'; Girelli 50'; Cernoia 90+1' (pen.)

Stadion Branko Čavlović-Čavlek, Karlovac
Attendance: 200
Referee: Marta Huerta de Aza (Spain)
21 September 2021
19:00 (20:00 EEST)

Moldova	0–6	Switzerland
	Report (FIFA); Report (UEFA)	Crnogorčević 39' (pen.); Sow 41'; Humm 42'; Fölmli 44'; Xhemaili 52'; Lehmann 87'

Zimbru Stadium, Chișinău
Referee: Anastasiya Romanyuk (Ukraine)
21 September 2021
19:30

Romania	3–0	Lithuania
Ciolacu 24' (pen.); Rus 36', 76'	Report (FIFA); Report (UEFA)

Stadionul Mogoșoaia, Mogoșoaia
Referee: Sandra Braz Bastos (Portugal)

22 October 2021
17:30

Italy	3–0	Croatia
Cernoia 2'; Girelli 9' (pen.); Pirone 64'	Report (FIFA); Report (UEFA)

Stadio Teofilo Patini, Castel di Sangro
Referee: Petra Pavlikova (Slovakia)
22 October 2021
19:00

Switzerland	2–0	Romania
Crnogorčević 48', 90' (pen.)	Report (FIFA); Report (UEFA)

Letzigrund, Zürich
Referee: Riem Hussein (Germany)

26 October 2021
17:30 (18:30 EEST)

Lithuania	0–5	Italy
	Report (FIFA); Report (UEFA)	Cernoia 13'; Pirone 23'; Giacinti 35'; Gama 54'; Caruso 83'

LFF Stadium, Vilnius
Attendance: 218
Referee: Jelena Medjedovic (Serbia)
26 October 2021
19:00

Switzerland	5–0	Croatia
Crnogorčević 8'; Maritz 45+2'; Bachmann 82', 90+1' (pen.); Rinast 88'	Report (FIFA); Report (UEFA)

Letzigrund, Zürich
Referee: Frida Nielsen (Denmark)

26 November 2021
17:00

Croatia	0–0	Lithuania
	Report (FIFA); Report (UEFA)

Stadion Aldo Drosina, Pula
Referee: Nadezhda Gorinova (Russia)
26 November 2021
17:30

Italy	1–2	Switzerland
Bonansea 60'	Report (FIFA); Report (UEFA)	Sow 9'; Crnogorčević 20'

Stadio Renzo Barbera, Palermo
Referee: Stéphanie Frappart (France)
26 November 2021
19:30 (20:30 EET)

Romania	3–0	Moldova
Bălăceanu 53'; Ciolacu 70'; Carp 89'	Report (FIFA); Report (UEFA)

Stadionul Mogoșoaia, Mogoșoaia
Referee: Michaliną Diakow (Poland)

30 November 2021
17:00

Croatia	4–0	Moldova
Marković 6'; Landeka 35' (pen.); Lubina 65'; Jelenčić 75'	Report (FIFA); Report (UEFA)

Stadion Aldo Drosina, Pula
Referee: Araksya Saribekyan (Armenia)
30 November 2021
17:30 (18:30 EET)

Lithuania	0–7	Switzerland
	Report (FIFA); Report (UEFA)	Sow 3', 31', 37'; Kiwic 12'; Crnogorčević 34'; Xhemaili 40'; Fölmli 61'

LFF Stadium, Vilnius
Referee: Zoe Stavrou (Cyprus)
30 November 2021
17:30 (18:30 EET)

Romania	0–5	Italy
	Report (FIFA); Report (UEFA)	Bonansea 22'; Girelli 53', 61', 90+4' (pen.); Pirone 87'

Stadionul Anghel Iordănescu, Voluntari
Referee: Catarina Campos (Portugal)

8 April 2022
17:00 (18:00 EEST)

Moldova	0–1	Croatia
	Report (FIFA); Report (UEFA)	Ljustina 31'

Zimbru Stadium, Chișinău
Referee: María Martínez (Spain)
8 April 2022
18:45 (19:45 EEST)

Romania	1–1	Switzerland
Ficzay 42'	Report (FIFA); Report (UEFA)	Kiwic 77'

Stadionul Arcul de Triumf, Bucharest
Referee: Marta Huerta de Aza (Spain)
8 April 2022
19:00

Italy	7–0	Lithuania
Caruso 2', 45+1'; Bergamaschi 41', 89'; Cernoia 61'; Sabatino 86'; Bonetti 90+2'	Report (FIFA); Report (UEFA)

Stadio Ennio Tardini, Parma
Referee: Elvira Nurmustafina (Kazakhstan)

12 April 2022
17:00

Croatia	0–1	Romania
	Report (FIFA); Report (UEFA)	Geréd 4'

Gradski stadion, Velika Gorica
Referee: Cheryl Foster (Wales)
12 April 2022
17:00 (18:00 EEST)

Lithuania	4–0	Moldova
Liužinaitė 27' (pen.), 45+1'; Sabatauskaitė 55'; Lazdauskaitė 60'	Report (FIFA); Report (UEFA)

LFF Stadium, Vilnius
Referee: Neslihan Muratdağı (Turkey)
12 April 2022
17:45

Switzerland	0–1	Italy
	Report (FIFA); Report (UEFA)	Girelli 83'

Stockhorn Arena, Thun
Referee: Rebecca Welch (England)

24 June 2022
17:00 (18:00 EEST)

Moldova	0–4	Romania
	Report (FIFA); Report (UEFA)	Ciolacu 7'; Railean 67' (o.g.); Gődér 89'; Vlădulescu 90+5'

Zimbru Stadium, Chișinău
Referee: Caroline Lanssens (Belgium)

28 June 2022
17:00 (18:00 EEST)

Moldova	1–1	Lithuania
Țabur 77'	Report (FIFA); Report (UEFA)	Lazdauskaitė 25'

Zimbru Stadium, Chișinău
Referee: Olatz Rivera Olmedo (Spain)

2 September 2022
17:30 (18:30 EEST)

Moldova	0–8	Italy
	Report (FIFA); Report (UEFA)	Giugliano 26'; Giacinti 32', 82'; Caruso 38', 64', 78', 90+6'; Bonfantini 59'

Zimbru Stadium, Chișinău
Referee: Emilie Torkelsen (Norway)
2 September 2022
18:00 (19:00 EEST)

Lithuania	1–7	Romania
Lazdauskaitė 68'	Report (FIFA); Report (UEFA)	Ciolacu 2'; Carp 3'; Vătafu 21'; Rus 23', 52'; Ficzay 61'; Marcu 64'

LFF Stadium, Vilnius
Referee: Lizzy Van Der Helm (Netherlands)
2 September 2022
19:00

Croatia	0–2	Switzerland
	Report (FIFA); Report (UEFA)	Bachmann 53'; Calligaris 65'

Stadion Branko Čavlović-Čavlek, Karlovac
Referee: Eleni Antoniou (Greece)

6 September 2022
18:00 (19:00 EEST)

Lithuania	0–1	Croatia
	Report (FIFA); Report (UEFA)	Lažeta 66' (pen.)

LFF Stadium, Vilnius
Referee: Cansu Tiryaki (Turkey)
6 September 2022
18:30

Italy	2–0	Romania
Giacinti 29'; Boattin 74'	Report (FIFA); Report (UEFA)

Stadio Paolo Mazza, Ferrara
Referee: Sara Persson (Sweden)
6 September 2022
18:30

Switzerland	15–0	Moldova
Calligaris 2', 62'; Bachmann 23'; Bühler 38'; Sow 32', 42', 45'; Reuteler 45+3', 45+4', 88'; Xhemaili 53', 75', 81'; Crnogorčević 57', 78' (pen.)	Report (FIFA); Report (UEFA)

Stade de la Tuilière, Lausanne
Referee: Réka Molnar (Hungary)

== Goalscorers ==
There were 119 goals scored in 30 matches, for an average of 3.97 goals per match.

9 goals

- (Switzerland) Coumba Sow

8 goals

- (Italy) Cristiana Girelli
- (Switzerland) Ana-Maria Crnogorčević

7 goals

- (Italy) Arianna Caruso
- (Italy) Valentina Giacinti

5 goals

- (Romania) Laura Rus
- (Switzerland) Ramona Bachmann
- (Switzerland) Riola Xhemaili

4 goals

- (Italy) Valentina Cernoia
- (Romania) Mihaela Ciolacu

3 goals

- (Italy) Valeria Pirone
- (Lithuania) Ugnė Lazdauskaitė
- (Romania) Cristina Carp
- (Switzerland) Viola Calligaris
- (Switzerland) Svenja Fölmli
- (Switzerland) Géraldine Reuteler

2 goals

- (Croatia) Iva Landeka
- (Italy) Valentina Bergamaschi
- (Italy) Barbara Bonansea
- (Italy) Sara Gama
- (Lithuania) Milda Liužinaitė
- (Romania) Maria Ficzay
- (Switzerland) Rahel Kiwic
- (Switzerland) Alisha Lehmann

1 goal

- (Croatia) Ana Jelenčić
- (Croatia) Anela Lubina
- (Croatia) Ella Ljustina
- (Croatia) Ana Maria Marković
- (Italy) Lisa Boattin
- (Italy) Tatiana Bonetti
- (Italy) Agnese Bonfantini
- (Italy) Manuela Giugliano
- (Italy) Daniela Sabatino
- (Lithuania) Rimantė Jonušaitė
- (Lithuania) Judita Sabatauskaitė
- (Moldova) Carolina Țabur
- (Romania) Ioana Bălăceanu
- (Romania) Erika Geréd
- (Romania) Brigitta Gődér
- (Romania) Carmen Marcu
- (Romania) Ștefania Vătafu
- (Romania) Ana Maria Vlădulescu
- (Switzerland) Luana Bühler
- (Switzerland) Fabienne Humm
- (Switzerland) Noelle Maritz
- (Switzerland) Rachel Rinast

1 own goal

- (Moldova) Eugenia Railean (against Romania)
