= Valentina Giacinti =

Italian footballer (born 1994)

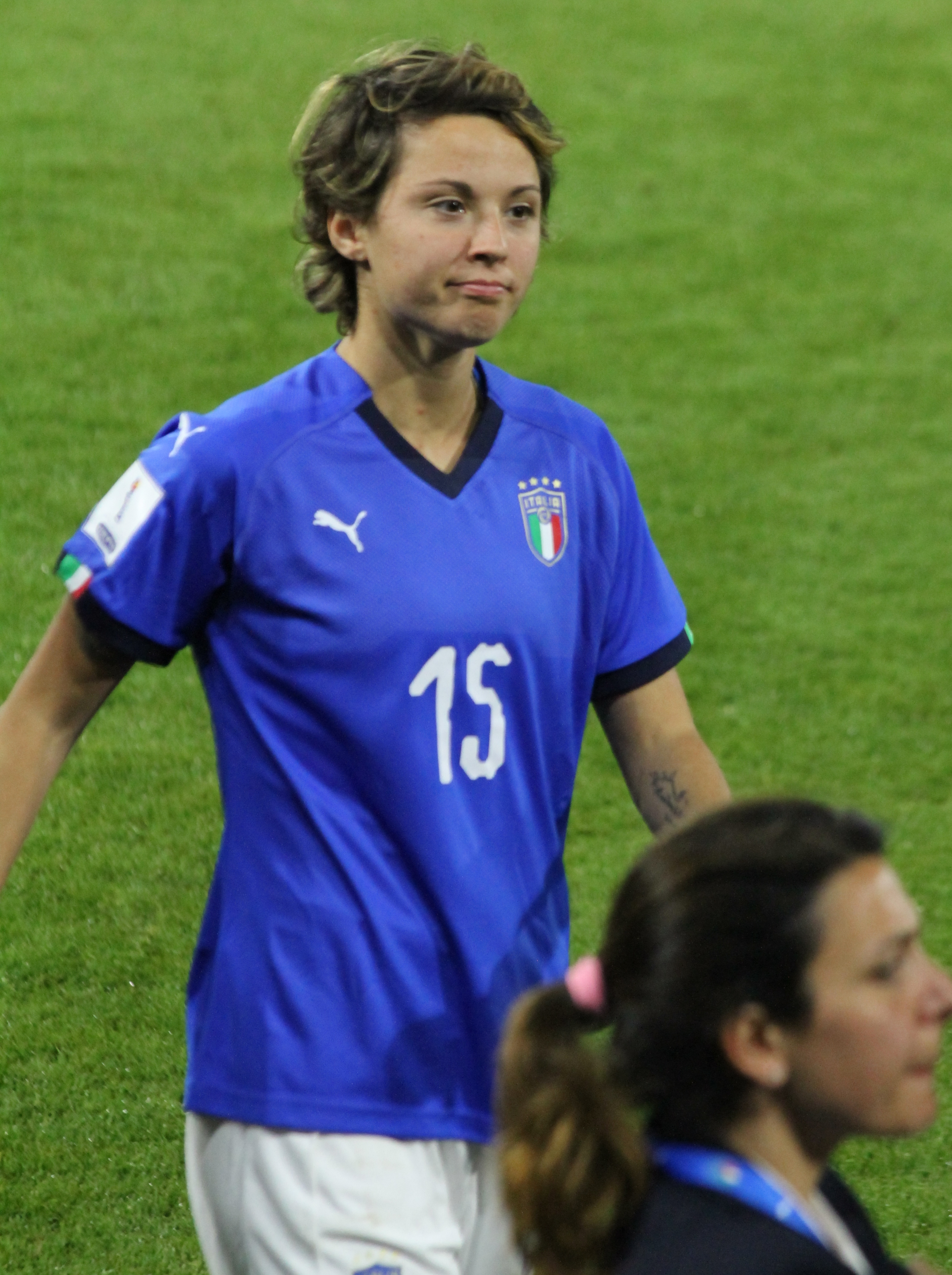
- Giacinti representing Italy in 2018

Personal information
- Date of birth: 2 January 1994 (age 32)
- Place of birth: Trescore Balneario, Italy
- Height: 1.70 m (5 ft 7 in)
- Position: Forward

Team information
- Current team: Como 1907
- Number: 19

Youth career
- 2005–2009: Atalanta

Senior career*
Years	Team	Apps	(Gls)
2009–2012	Atalanta	56	(34)
2012–2013	Napoli	29	(17)
2013	→ AC Seattle (loan)	6	(4)
2013–2017	Mozzanica	96	(86)
2017–2018	Brescia	22	(21)
2018–2022	Milan	68	(55)
2022	→ Fiorentina (loan)	7	(3)
2022–2025	Roma	75	(31)
2025–2026	Galatasaray	13	(14)
2026–	Como 1907	12	(9)

International career^{‡}
2015–	Italy	71	(25)
- * Club domestic league appearances and goals as of 25 August 2026 (UTC) ‡ National team caps and goals as of 18:15, 21 January 2023 (UTC)

Valentina Giacinti (born 2 January 1994) is an Italian professional footballer who plays as forward for Serie A club Como 1907 and the Italy women's national team.

== Club career ==
=== P.C.A. Atalanta ===
Giacinti began her career with the P.C.A. Atalanta youth team. She made her senior career debut on 30 January 2010 as a 65th minute substitute in a Serie A match against Graphistudio Tavagnacco. She made a total of ten appearances for the club in her debut season but did not score for the season. Atalanta was relegated to Serie A2 at the end of the season.

The following 2010–11 Seria A2 season would prove to be Giacinti's breakout season as she established herself as a starter for her team. She would begin her season with her first senior career goal on 26 September 2010 in a league match against Entella Chiavari, ending the match with a hat-trick. She would end the season with 15 goals in 21 appearances. The next season, she would scored another 19 goals in 25 appearances.

=== Napoli ===
On 17 July 2012, Giacinti completed her move to Napoli. On 2 September 2012, she scored her first goal for the club in the Coppa Italia match against Caira. She would end the season with 19 goals in 34 appearances across all competition.

=== Mozzanica ===
On 17 July 2013, Giacinti would transfer to Mozzanica.

=== Brescia ===
In the summer of 2017, Giacinti moved to Brescia to pursue UEFA Women's Champions League football. While with Brescia, she won the Supercoppa Italiana for the first time and completed her season as the league's top scorer for the second time in her career, with 21 goals, and help her club reach the final play-off for the scudetto before losing to Juventus.

=== A.C. Milan ===
On 11 June 2018, Brescia's Serie A license and their senior player contracts was bought over by A.C. Milan in order to start their own women's section. Giacinti's contract was then transferred to the newly formed A.C. Milan Femminile. She would continue her excellent scoring streak and ended as the league's top scorer again with 21 goals in 21 games played.

Following the departure of Daniela Sabatino in the 2019–20 season, Giacinti was made the new team captain for Milan. She suffered a cervical trauma during a home match against Tavagnacco. She was sidelined for a few days before the league was suspended due to the COVID-19 pandemic.

The following season, Giacinti would help A.C. Milan to qualify for the UEFA Women's Champions League for the first time in their history as they finished second in the league. They would also reached the final of the Coppa Italia, where they lost on penalties against Roma. She would end the season as the club's top scorer again with 24 goals in 29 appearances across all competition.

In her fourth season with the club, Giacinti would become the first player to cross the milestone of 50 goals in Serie A wearing the Rossoneri shirt. She was stripped of the captain armband in favor of Valentina Bergamaschi following some frictions with the technical staff. She would then depart the club during the winter transfer window.

==== Fiorentina (loan) ====
During the 2022 January transfer window, Giacinti would completed her loan transfer to Fiorentina. Her first goal in the purple shirt came in a 2-2 draw against Juventus on 22 January 2022. She would suffer an injury on 20 March 2022 in a home match against Verona. She would return on the final day of the campaign where she scores a brace against Empoli and helped Fiorentina avoid relegation.

=== A.S. Roma ===
On 21 July 2022, Giacinti completed her transfer to Roma. She made her debut for the club on 18 August 2022, during Roma debut in the UEFA Women's Champions League match against Glasgow City. Her first goal in the Giallorosse shirt came on 28 August 2022 in a 2-0 away win against Pomigliano. On 5 November 2022, she won the Supercoppa Italiana for the second time in her career after beating Juventus 4-3 on penalties. On 11 February 2023, she played her 250th match in Serie A during a league match against Inter Milan.

=== Galatasaray ===
On 1 August 2025, she signed a contract with the Turkish club Galatasaray.

=== Como 1907 ===
On 23 January 2026, Giacinti joined Serie B club Como 1907.

== International career ==
Giacinti was named in the 23-player Italy squad for the 2019 FIFA Women's World Cup. Despite Giacinti's prolific record at club level, national team coach Milena Bertolini tended to deploy her as a substitute in the run up to the tournament. Giacinti scored Italy's opening goal in a 2–0 victory against China in the round of 16.

On 26 June 2022, Giacinti was announced in the Italy squad for the UEFA Women's Euro 2022.

On 2 July 2023, Giacinti was called up to the 23-player Italy squad for the 2023 FIFA Women's World Cup.

== Career statistics ==
=== Club ===
As of match played 15 August 2026

Appearances and goals by club, season and competition
Club	Season	League			Coppa Italia		Continental (Note: includes UEFA Women's Champions League)		Other (Note: includes Supercoppa Italiana)		Total	
Club	Season	Division	Apps	Goals	Apps	Goals	Apps	Goals	Apps	Goals	Apps	Goals
Atalanta	2009–10	Serie A	10	0	1	0	—		—		11	0
Atalanta	2010–11	Serie A2	21	15	3	2	—		—		24	17
Atalanta	2011–12	Serie A2	25	19	1	0	—		—		26	19
Atalanta	Total		56	34	5	2	—		—		61	36
Napoli	2012–13	Serie A	29	17	5	2	—		—		34	19
AC Seattle (loan)	2013	WPSL	6	4	—		—		—		6	4
Mozzanica	2013–14	Serie A	26	19	4	3	—		—		30	22
Mozzanica	2014–15	Serie A	26	21	6	6	—		—		32	27
Mozzanica	2015–16	Serie A	22	32	6	9	—		—		28	41
Mozzanica	2016–17	Serie A	22	14	4	5	—		—		26	19
Mozzanica	Total		96	86	20	23	—		—		116	109
Brescia	2017–18	Serie A	23	21	7	6	4	0	1	0	35	27
A.C. Milan	2018–19	Serie A	21	21	5	2	—		—		26	23
A.C. Milan	2019–20	Serie A	15	9	2	0	—		—		17	9
A.C. Milan	2020–21	Serie A	21	18	7	5	—		1	1	29	24
A.C. Milan	2021–22	Serie A	11	7	1	1	2	2	0	0	14	10
A.C. Milan	Total		68	55	15	8	2	2	1	1	86	66
Fiorentina (loan)	2021–22	Serie A	7	3	2	0	—		—		9	3
A.S. Roma	2022–23	Serie A	25	13	6	2	12	4	1	1	44	20
A.S. Roma	2023–24	Serie A	26	12	5	1	8	5	1	0	40	18
A.S. Roma	2024–25	Serie A	24	6	3	2	8	4	1	1	36	13
A.S. Roma	Total		75	31	14	5	28	13	3	2	120	51
Galatasaray	2025–26	Süper Lig	13	14	—		—		—		13	14
Como 1907	2025–26	Serie B	12	9	—		—		—		12	9
Career total			385	270	67	46	34	15	5	3	491	334

=== International ===
As of match played 21 January 2024

Appearances and goals by national team and year
National team	Year	Apps	Goals
Italy	2015	3	0
Italy	2016	1	0
Italy	2017	4	0
Italy	2018	10	2
Italy	2019	15	6
Italy	2020	3	1
Italy	2021	9	7
Italy	2022	12	5
Italy	2023	14	3
Italy	2024	0	0
Total		71	24

Scores and results list Italy's goal tally first, score column indicates score after each Giacinti goal.

List of international goals scored by Valentina Giacinti
No.	Date	Venue	Opponent	Score	Result	Competition	Ref.
1	5 March 2018	AEK Arena, Larnaca, Cyprus	Finland	1–1	2–2	2018 Cyprus Cup	
2	6 April 2018	Stadionul CPSM, Vadul lui Vodă, Moldova	Moldova	3–1	3–1	2019 FIFA Women's World Cup qualification	
3	27 February 2019	Antonis Papadopoulos Stadium, Larnaca, Cyprus	Mexico	4–0	5–0	2019 Cyprus Cup	
4	27 February 2019	Antonis Papadopoulos Stadium, Larnaca, Cyprus	Mexico	5–0	5–0	2019 Cyprus Cup	
5	2 March 2019	GSZ Stadium, Larnaca, Cyprus	Hungary	1–0	3–0	2019 Cyprus Cup	
6	2 March 2019	GSZ Stadium, Larnaca, Cyprus	Hungary	2–0	3–0	2019 Cyprus Cup	
7	25 July 2019	Stade de la Mosson, Montpellier, France	China	1–0	2–0	2019 FIFA Women's World Cup	
8	29 August 2019	Ramat Gan Stadium, Ramat Gan, Israel	Israel	3–1	3–2	UEFA Women's Euro 2022 qualifying	
9	27 October 2020	Stadio Carlo Castellani, Empoli, Italy	Denmark	1–3	1–3	UEFA Women's Euro 2022 qualifying	
10	24 February 2021	Stadio Artemio Franchi, Florence, Italy	Israel	1–0	12–0	UEFA Women's Euro 2022 qualifying	
11	24 February 2021	Stadio Artemio Franchi, Florence, Italy	Israel	3–0	12–0	UEFA Women's Euro 2022 qualifying	
12	13 April 2021	Campo Enzo Bearzot, Coverciano, Italy	Iceland	1–0	1–1	Friendly	
13	17 September 2021	Stadio Nereo Rocco, Trieste, Italy	Moldova	3–0	3–0	2023 FIFA Women's World Cup qualification	
14	21 September 2021	Stadion Branko Čavlović-Čavlek, Karlovac, Croatia	Croatia	2–0	5–0	2023 FIFA Women's World Cup qualification	
15	21 September 2021	Stadion Branko Čavlović-Čavlek, Karlovac, Croatia	Croatia	3–0	5–0	2023 FIFA Women's World Cup qualification	
16	26 October 2021	LFF Stadium, Vilnius, Lithuania	Lithuania	3–0	5–0	2023 FIFA Women's World Cup qualification	
17	20 February 2022	Estádio Algarve, Algarve, Portugal	Norway	1–0	2–1	2022 Algarve Cup	
18	23 February 2022	Estádio Municipal de Lagos, Lagos, Portugal	Sweden	1–0	1–1 (5–6 p)	2022 Algarve Cup	
19	2 September 2022	Zimbru Stadium, Chișinău, Moldova	Moldova	2–0	8–0	2023 FIFA Women's World Cup qualification	
20	2 September 2022	Zimbru Stadium, Chișinău, Moldova	Moldova	7–0	8–0	2023 FIFA Women's World Cup qualification	
21	6 September 2022	Stadio Paolo Mazza, Ferrara, Italy	Romania	1–0	2–0	2023 FIFA Women's World Cup qualification	
22	11 April 2023	Stadio Tre Fontane, Rome, Italy	Colombia	1–0	2–1	Friendly	
23	31 October 2023	Stadion, Malmö, Sweden	Sweden	1–0	1–1	2023–24 UEFA Women's Nations League	
24	1 December 2023	Estadio Municipal de Pasarón, Pontevedra, Spain	Spain	1–1	3–2	2023–24 UEFA Women's Nations League	
25	5 April 2024	Stadio San Vito-Luigi Marulla, Italy	Netherlands	1-0	2-0	Women's EURO Qualification League A Grp. 1 Round 1	

== Honours ==
Brescia

- Supercoppa Italiana: 2017

AS Roma

- Serie A: 2022–23, 2023–24
- Coppa Italia: 2023–24
- Supercoppa Italiana: 2022, 2024

Como 1907

- Serie B: 2025–26

Individual

- Serie A top scorer: 2015–16, 2017–18, 2018–19
- Serie A Team of the Season: 2022–23, 2023–24
- AIC Serie A Women's Team of the Year: 2018–19
- Italian Football Hall of Fame: 2023
