= Viola Calligaris =

Swiss footballer (born 1996)

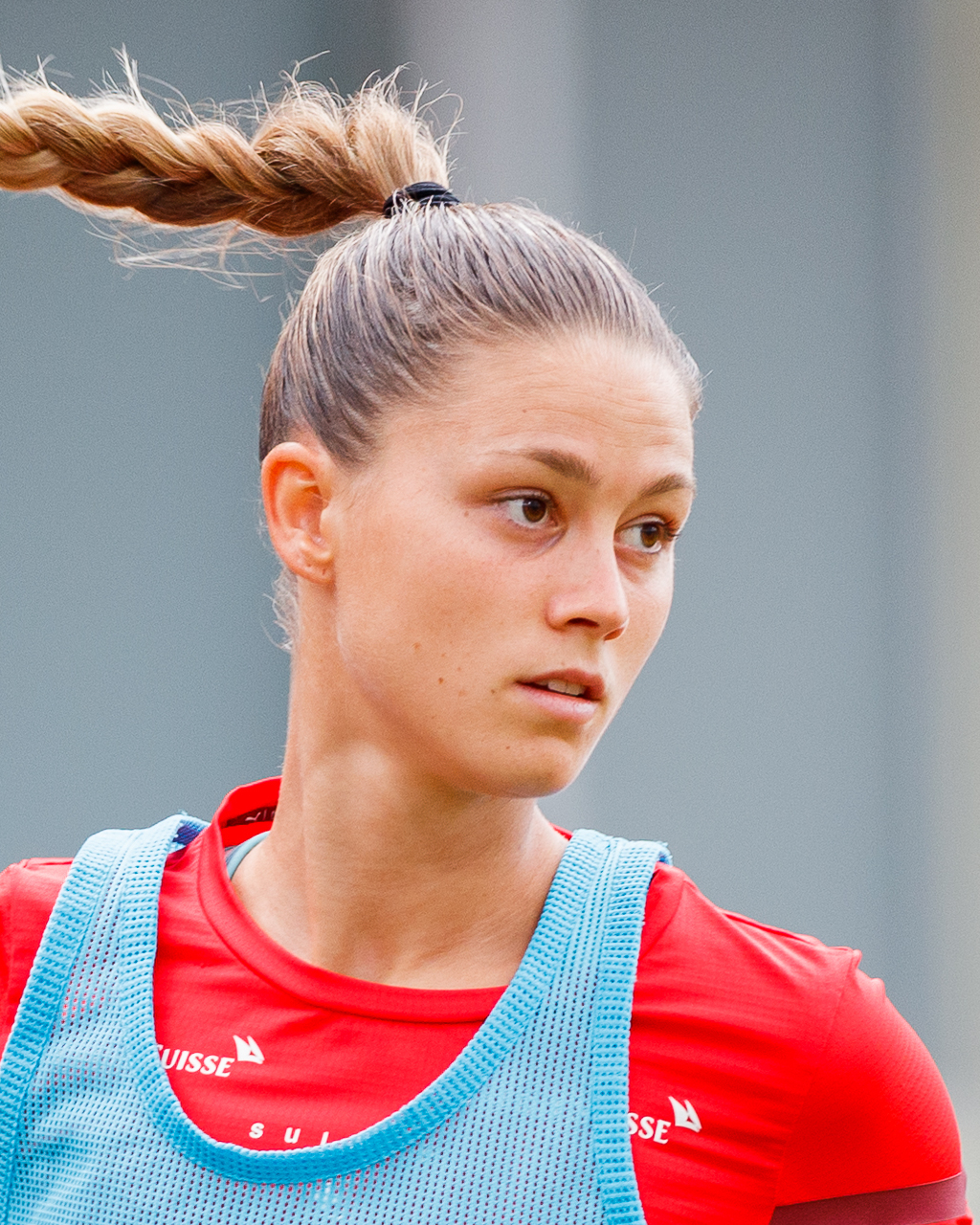
- Calligaris warming up for Switzerland in 2022

Personal information
- Full name: Viola Mónica Calligaris
- Date of birth: 17 March 1996 (age 30)
- Place of birth: Sarnen, Switzerland
- Height: 1.67 m (5 ft 6 in)
- Position: Centre-back

Team information
- Current team: Atlético Madrid
- Number: 19

Youth career
- 2004–2009: FC Giswil
- 2009: FC Sachseln
- 2009–2011: SC Kriens
- 2011–2012: SC Emmen

Senior career*
Years	Team	Apps	(Gls)
2012–2013	SC Kriens		
2013–2017	BSC YB	58	(11)
2017–2019	Atlético Madrid	33	(3)
2019–2020	Valencia	21	(0)
2020–2023	Levante	46	(1)
2023–2024	Paris Saint-Germain	6	(0)
2024	→ Juventus (loan)	15	(0)
2024–2026	Juventus	34	(0)
2026–	Atlético Madrid	0	(0)

International career^{‡}
2012	Switzerland U16	1	(0)
2012–2013	Switzerland U17	11	(10)
2013–2015	Switzerland U19	14	(4)
2016–	Switzerland	82	(9)
- * Club domestic league appearances and goals as of 1 December 2025 ‡ National team caps and goals as of 14 October 2026

Viola Mónica Calligaris (born 17 March 1996) is a Swiss professional footballer who plays as a centre-back for Liga F club Atlético Madrid and the Switzerland national team.

== Club career ==
Calligaris began playing football at FC Giswil in Obwalden at a young age. In March 2009, she moved to FC Sachseln and in September of the same year, Calligaris moved to SC Kriens. She then went to SC Emmen United. In 2012, she began her professional career at SC Kriens. In 2013, Calligaris signed with Swiss powerhouse BSC Young Boys. For the 2017/18 season, she moved to Atlético Madrid in the Spanish Primera División.

On 29 June 2023, Paris Saint-Germain announced the signing of Calligaris on a two-year deal until June 2025.

On 15 January 2024, Calligaris joined Juventus on a loan deal until the end of the season. On 7 July 2024, Juventus announced the signing of Calligaris on a permanent deal until June 2026.

On 7 July 2026, Calligaris returned to Atlético Madrid on a two-year contract, running until 30 June 2028.

== International career ==
With the U17 team, Calligaris played at the 2013 UEFA Women's Under-17 Championship qualification. Despite scoring nine goals in six matches, her team was unable to reach the tournament final stages. With the U19 team, she played at the 2014 and 2015 UEFA Women's Under-19 Championship qualification phases, but Switzerland failed to qualify for both of the tournaments. In March 2016, Calligaris debuted for the Swiss senior team in two friendly matches against the United States. On 3 July 2017, Calligaris was called up to the UEFA Women's Euro 2017 squad. She played in the match against France, replacing Martina Moser in the 65th minute. On 24 November 2017, in a match against Belarus in the 2019 FIFA Women's World Cup qualification phase, Calligaris scored her first senior international goal.

On 23 June 2025, Calligaris was called up to the Switzerland squad for the UEFA Women's Euro 2025.

== Personal life ==
She holds dual Swiss and Italian citizenship.

== Career statistics ==
=== International ===
As of match played 24 October 2025

Appearances and goals by national team and year
National team	Year	Apps	Goals
Switzerland	2016	3	0
Switzerland	2017	7	2
Switzerland	2018	7	1
Switzerland	2019	7	0
Switzerland	2020	4	0
Switzerland	2021	1	0
Switzerland	2022	10	2
Switzerland	2023	9	0
Switzerland	2024	12	3
Switzerland	2025	12	0
Total		72	8

Scores and results list Switzerland's goal tally first, score column indicates score after each Calligaris goal.

List of international goals scored by Viola Calligaris
No.	Date	Venue	Opponent	Score	Result	Competition
1	24 November 2017	Wefox Arena, Schaffhausen, Switzerland	Belarus	1–0	3–0	2019 FIFA Women's World Cup qualification
2	28 November 2017	Tissot Arena, Biel/Bienne, Switzerland	Albania	4–1	5–1	2019 FIFA Women's World Cup qualification
3	12 June 2018	FC Minsk Stadium, Minsk, Belarus	Belarus	5–0	5–0	2019 FIFA Women's World Cup qualification
4	2 September 2022	Stadion Branko Čavlović-Čavlek, Karlovac, Croatia	Croatia	2–0	2–0	2023 FIFA Women's World Cup qualification
5	6 September 2022	Stade de la Tuilière, Lausanne, Switzerland	Moldova	1–0	15–0	2023 FIFA Women's World Cup qualification
6	5 April 2024	Letzigrund, Zürich, Switzerland	Turkey	1–0	3–1	2025 UEFA Women's Euro qualification
7	5 April 2024	Letzigrund, Zürich, Switzerland	Turkey	3–0	3–1	2025 UEFA Women's Euro qualification
8	16 July 2024	Stade Olympique de la Pontaise, Lausanne, Switzerland	Azerbaijan	2–0	3–0	2025 UEFA Women's Euro qualification
9	14 April 2026	Letzigrund, Zurich, Switzerland	Turkey	3–1	3–1	2027 FIFA Women's World Cup qualification
