= Sara Gama =

Italian footballer (born 1989)

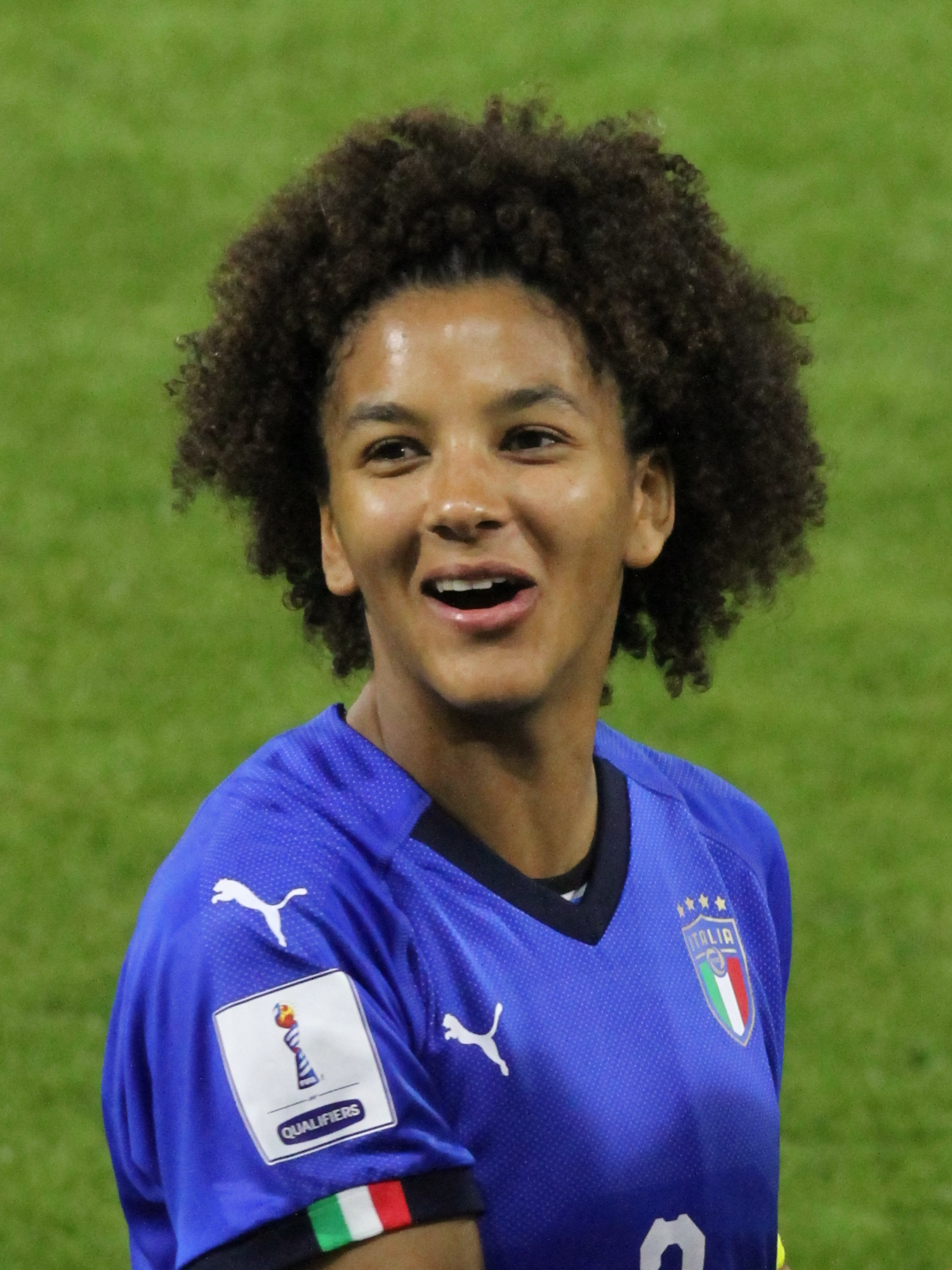
- Sara Gama, in an international match against Belgium in 2018

Personal information
- Date of birth: 27 March 1989 (age 37)
- Place of birth: Trieste, Italy
- Height: 1.68 m (5 ft 6 in)
- Position: Centre-back

Senior career*
Years	Team	Apps	(Gls)
2006–2009	Tavagnacco	52	(4)
2009–2012	Chiasiellis	50	(2)
2010	→ Pali Blues (loan)	3	(0)
2012–2013	Brescia	25	(3)
2013–2015	Paris Saint-Germain	11	(0)
2015–2017	Brescia	39	(3)
2017–2025	Juventus	110	(3)

International career^{‡}
2006–2024	Italy	135	(7)
- * Club domestic league appearances and goals as of 14 July 2025 ‡ National team caps and goals as of 14 July 2025 (UTC)

Sara Gama (born 27 March 1989) is an Italian former professional footballer who played as a centre-back.

She most notably played for Serie A club Juventus, of which she captained, and formerly the Italy national team, which she also captained.

She is a seven-time Serie A winner, six of them with Juventus, and reached the knockout stages of two European Championships and one FIFA Women's World Cup with Italy.

== Club career ==
Gama was passionate about football since a young age, joining Zaule (Muggia) and playing in mixed youth teams for them, later moving to Polisportiva San Marco in Villaggio del Pescatore in the municipality of Duino-Aurisina, where she remained for six years, playing for the first time in an all-female team.

In a three-year period with UPC Tavagnacco, she made 52 appearances and scored 4 goals. With the yellow and blues, she finished third in Serie A Femminile in 2008–2009 season and reached the quarter-finals of the Italian Cup in her first two seasons there.

Subsequently, she moved to another Serie A club Chiasiellis where she collected 50 appearances and scored twice, but during her third season there, suffered a serious knee injury while on international duty with Italy, keeping her out for most of the 2011–12 season, limiting her to seven club appearances out of 26 games played by the club. In her debut year at Chiasiellis, she played in the semi-finals of the 2010 Italian Cup, and finished seventh in Serie A in 2011–12, under the management of Fabio Franti.

During the summer break in 2010 she took the opportunity to play in a foreign championship for the first time, temporarily moving on loan to Pali Blues to play in the W-League.

Gama played for PSG of Division 1 Féminine in between two spells with Brescia, where she won a Serie A championship and Coppa Italia double in 2015–2016, plus two consecutive Italian Super Cups in 2015 and 2016.

Juventus signed Gama on the establishment of their women's team and appointed her captain straight away. With Juve, Gama won five consecutive league titles from 2017–2018 to 2021–2022, plus three more Italian Cups in 2019, 2022 and 2023. Three consecutive Italian Super Cups from 2019 to 2021 were also claimed.

== International career ==
Gama was a member of the Italian national team, and was selected for four European Championships and one FIFA Women's World Cup. As an Under-19 international she won the 2008 U-19 European Championship serving as the team's captain, and was named Player of the Tournament.

Gama made her senior debut for the Italy women's national football team as a 16-year-old in June 2006, in a 2–1 defeat by Ukraine in the qualifiers for the 2007 FIFA Women's World Cup.

Gama reached two European Championship quarter-finals for Italy, the first coming in her debut tournament in 2009, and again in 2013 under national coach Antonio Cabrini. Both tournaments ended in the last-eight at the hands of eventual winners Germany.

Cabrini named Gama as Italy captain in 2014.

Gama was called up to the Italy squad for the UEFA Women's Euro 2017.

Under Milena Bertolini, Italy and Gama qualified for the 2019 FIFA Women's World Cup, their first time in the tournament for twenty years, losing to the Netherlands in the quarter-finals, the Azzurri's joint best ever performance. Gama and Italy also finished runners-up at the Algarve Cup in Portugal in 2020 (withdrawing from the final due to the start of the COVID-19 pandemic) and 2022.

On 26 June 2022, Gama was announced in the Italy squad for the UEFA Women's Euro 2022.

Despite being captain, Gama was not called up to the Italy squad for the 2023 FIFA Women's World Cup, with coach Bertolini wanting to include more younger players.

Gama was recalled to the national squad after the World Cup by new coach Andrea Soncin, featuring in the 2023-24 UEFA Women's Nations League, her final competition before deciding to retire from international football at the age of 34. Her 140th and final appearance for the Azzurri was in a goalless draw against Ireland in Bagno a Ripoli on 23 February 2024. At the time of retirement, she was the fourth-highest capped Italian women's player of all time.

== Personal life ==
Gama's mother is Italian, while her father is Congolese.

In 2017, she graduated in Languages at the Università degli Studi di Udine. She speaks Italian, English, French and Spanish.

In 2018, for the International Women's Day, Mattel presented the Sara Gama Barbie doll as part of the Barbie's Heroes doll line.

During her football career she was the victim of racist insults, which became more pronounced when she became captain of the Italian national team. She publicly urged the Italian football authorities to take punitive action to combat the phenomenon of racism.

She supported professional women's football before its introduction in Italy, calling for social and welfare protection for female footballers.

Since October 2018, she has been a councilor of the FIGC for the Italian Footballers' Association (AIC), and on 30 November 2020 was elected vice president of the AIC, the first woman in history to hold the position. With this role, on 9 June 2021 she joined the CONI National Athletes' Commission.

A documentary on her career Numero 3, Sara Gama was broadcast in Italy on RAI in January 2023.

== Honours ==
Brescia

- Serie A: 2015–16
- Coppa Italia: 2015–16
- Italian Women's Super Cup: 2015, 2016

Juventus

- Serie A: 2017–18, 2018–19, 2019–20, 2020–21, 2021–22, 2024–25
- Coppa Italia: 2018–19, 2021–22, 2022–23, 2024–25
- Supercoppa Italiana: 2019, 2020–21, 2021–22

Individual

- AIC Best Women's XI: 2019
- Italian Football Hall of Fame: 2019
- Juventus FC Hall of Fame: 2025

== Career statistics ==
=== International ===
As of match played 23 February 2024

Appearances and goals by national team and year
National team	Year	Apps	Goals
Italy	2006	2	0
Italy	2007	12	1
Italy	2008	10	0
Italy	2009	10	2
Italy	2010	14	0
Italy	2011	11	0
Italy	2012	0	0
Italy	2013	5	1
Italy	2014	2	0
Italy	2015	9	0
Italy	2016	8	1
Italy	2017	9	0
Italy	2018	7	0
Italy	2019	15	0
Italy	2020	3	0
Italy	2021	9	2
Italy	2022	6	0
Italy	2023	2	0
Italy	2024	1	0
Total		135	7

Scores and results list Italy's goal tally first, score column indicates score after each Gama goal.

List of international goals scored by Sara Gama
No.	Date	Venue	Opponent	Score	Result	Competition
1	12 March 2007	Estádio Dr. Francisco Vieira, Silves, Portugal	Republic of Ireland	4–1	4–1	2007 Algarve Cup
2	19 September 2009	Domžale Sports Park, Domžale, Slovenia	Armenia	3–0	8–0	2011 FIFA Women's World Cup qualification
3	19 September 2009	Domžale Sports Park, Domžale, Slovenia	Armenia	5–0	8–0	2011 FIFA Women's World Cup qualification
4	11 March 2013	GSP Stadium, Nicosia, Cyprus	Scotland	1–2	1–2	2013 Cyprus Women's Cup
5	7 December 2016	Arena da Amazônia, Manaus, Brazil	Russia	1–0	3–0	2016 Torneio Internacional de Manaus de Futebol
6	21 September 2021	Stadion Branko Čavlović-Čavlek, Karlovac, Croatia	Croatia	1–0	5–0	2023 FIFA Women's World Cup qualification
7	26 October 2021	LFF Stadium, Vilnius, Lithuania	Lithuania	4–0	5–0	2023 FIFA Women's World Cup qualification

== See also ==
- List of women's footballers with 100 or more caps
