= Carmen Marcu =

Romanian footballer (born 2001)

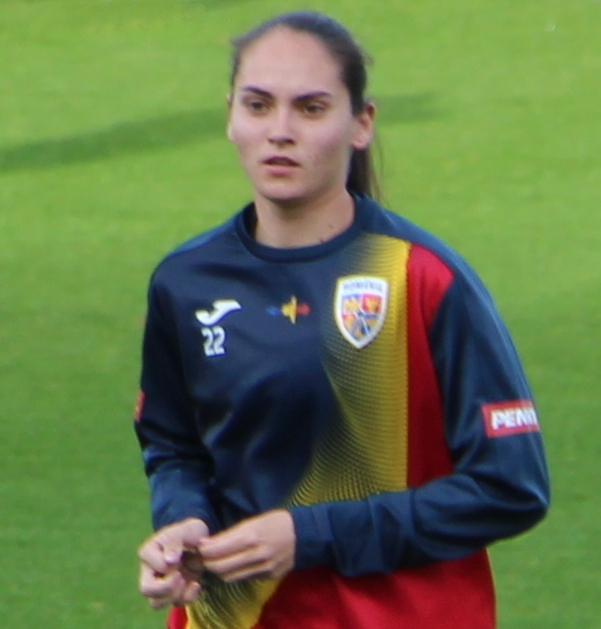

Personal information
- Date of birth: 30 August 2001 (age 25)
- Position: Forward

Team information
- Current team: Olimpia Cluj
- Number: 90

International career^{‡}
Years	Team	Apps	(Gls)
2019	Romania U17	3	(1)
2020–	Romania U19	5	(1)
2020–	Romania	4	(2)
- ‡ National team caps and goals as of 19:16, 31 January 2021 (UTC)

Carmen Marcu (born 30 August 2001) is a Romanian footballer who plays as a forward for Olimpia Cluj and the Romania women's national team.

== Career ==
She made her debut for the Romania national team on 23 October 2020 against Lithuania, coming on as a substitute for Laura Rus.

== International goals ==
No.	Date	Venue	Opponent	Score	Result	Competition
1.	23 February 2022	Marbella Football Center, Marbella, Spain	Northern Ireland	1–0	1–0	Friendly
2.	2 September 2022	LFF Stadium, Vilnius, Lithuania	Lithuania	7–0	7–1	2023 FIFA Women's World Cup qualification
3.	28 October 2025	Concordia Stadium, Chiajna, Romania	Ukraine	1–1	1–1	Friendly
