= Cristina Carp =

Romanian footballer (born 1997)

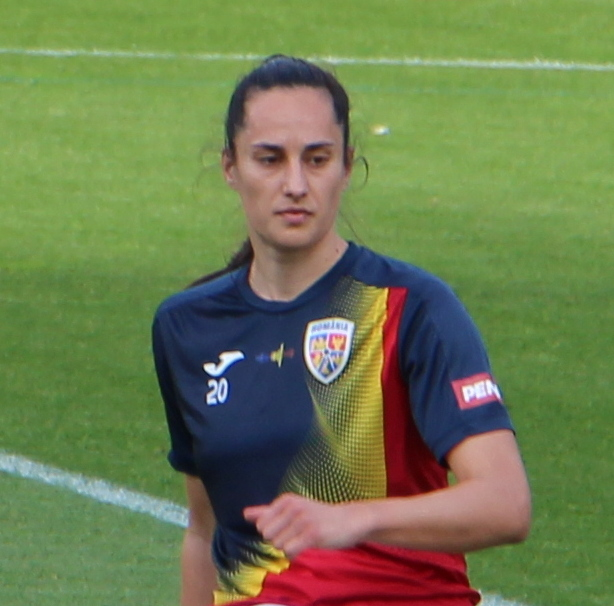

Personal information
- Full name: Cristina Carp
- Date of birth: 28 July 1997 (age 29)
- Place of birth: Tecuci
- Height: 1.72 m (5 ft 8 in)
- Position: Forward

Team information
- Current team: YB Frauen
- Number: 28

Senior career*
Years	Team	Apps	(Gls)
2014–2019	FCU Olimpia Cluj	75	(54)
2019–2020	Bari	16	(4)
2020-	Fortuna Hjørring	11	(2)
2021	Lugano	11	(5)
2021–2022	Sampdoria	7	(1)
2022-	YB Frauen	30	(10)

International career^{‡}
2016-	Romania	17	(7)
- * Club domestic league appearances and goals as of 16:40, 3 March 2024 (UTC) ‡ National team caps and goals as of 17:32, 13 February 2021 (UTC)

Cristina Carp (born 28 July 1997) is a Romanian footballer who plays as a forward for YB Frauen in the Swiss Women's Super League and has appeared for the Romania women's national team.

== Career ==
Carp has been capped for the Romania national team, appearing for the team during the 2019 FIFA Women's World Cup qualifying cycle.

== International goals ==
No.	Date	Venue	Opponent	Score	Result	Competition
1.	3 March 2017	Gold City, Alanya, Turkey	Kosovo	1–0	3–0	2017 Turkish Women's Cup
2.	17 September 2021	Stadionul Mogoșoaia, Mogoșoaia, Romania	Croatia	2–0	2–0	2023 FIFA Women's World Cup qualification
3.	26 November 2021	Stadionul Mogoșoaia, Mogoșoaia, Romania	Moldova	3–0	3–0	2023 FIFA Women's World Cup qualification
4.	2 September 2022	LFF Stadium, Vilnius, Lithuania	Lithuania	2–0	7–1	2023 FIFA Women's World Cup qualification
5.	11 April 2023	Stadionul Arcul de Triumf, Bucharest, Romania	Morocco	1–0	1–0	Friendly
6.	9 April 2024	Stadionul Arcul de Triumf, Bucharest, Romania	Kazakhstan	1–0	1–0	UEFA Women's Euro 2025 qualifying
7.	4 June 2024	Stadion Aleksandar Shalamanov, Sofia, Bulgaria	Bulgaria	2–0	3–0	UEFA Women's Euro 2025 qualifying
8.	12 July 2024	Almaty Central Stadium, Almaty, Kazakhstan	Kazakhstan	1–0	3–0	UEFA Women's Euro 2025 qualifying
9.	3 December 2024	Eugen Popescu Stadium, Târgoviște, Romania	Albania	1–1	1–2	Friendly
10.	30 May 2025	Central Stadium, Ovidiu, Romania	Bosnia and Herzegovina	2–0	2–0	2025 UEFA Women's Nations League
