= Erika Geréd =

Romanian footballer (born 1999)

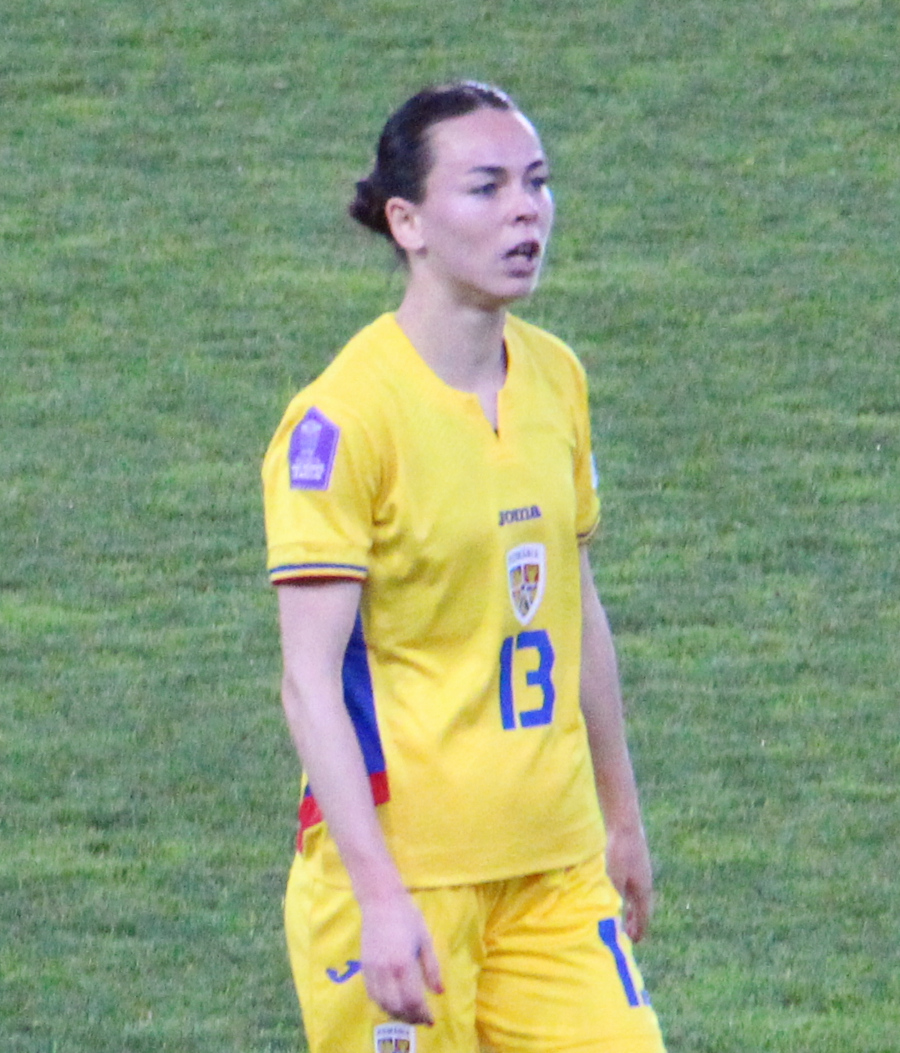

Personal information
- Date of birth: 28 April 1999 (age 27)
- Place of birth: Harghita County, Romania
- Position: Midfielder

Team information
- Current team: Vasas

International career^{‡}
Years	Team	Apps	(Gls)
	Romania	6	(0)
- ‡ National team caps and goals as of 19:47, 30 August 2019 (UTC)

Erika Geréd, sometimes written as Erika Gered (born 28 April 1999), is a Romanian footballer of Hungarian ethnicity who plays as a midfielder for Vasas Femina FC and has appeared for the Romania women's national team.

== Career ==
Gered has been capped for the Romania national team, appearing for the team during the 2019 FIFA Women's World Cup qualifying cycle.

== International goals ==
No.	Date	Venue	Opponent	Score	Result	Competition
1.	12 April 2022	Gradski stadion, Velika Gorica, Croatia	Croatia	1–0	1–0	2023 FIFA Women's World Cup qualification
