= 2019 Aphrodite Women Cup =

Friendly association football tournament played in the Cyprus

Tournament details
- Host country: Cyprus
- Dates: February 27 – March 2
- Teams: 4 (from 1 confederation)
- Venue(s): 2 (in 2 host cities)

Final positions
- Champions: Cyprus (1st title)

Tournament statistics
- Matches played: 6
- Goals scored: 10 (1.67 per match)

The 2019 Aphrodite Women Cup was the 4th edition of Aphrodite Women Cup, a friendly association football tournament played in Cyprus.

== Teams ==
Team	FIFA Rankings (7 December 2018)
Estonia	98
Malta	101
Lithuania	103
Cyprus	NR

== Group stage ==
Team	Pld	W	D	L	GF	GA	GD	Pts
Cyprus	3	2	0	1	3	2	+1	6
Malta	3	1	2	0	3	2	+1	5
Estonia	3	1	1	1	1	1	0	4
Lithuania	3	0	1	2	3	5	−2	1

February 27, 2019
10:00

Estonia	0–0	Malta
	Report

Limassol
February 27, 2019
12:15

Cyprus	2–1	Lithuania
Kirkini 36'; Andronikou 69'	Report	Sabatauskaitė 73'

Limassol

February 28, 2019
10:00

Lithuania	0–1	Estonia
	Report	Bannikova 45'

Limassol
February 28, 2019
12:15

Cyprus	0–1	Malta
	Report	Borg 50'

Limassol

March 2, 2019
10:00

Malta	2–2	Lithuania
Theuma 52'; 74' (o.g.)	Report	15'; 62'

Limassol
March 2, 2019
12:15

Cyprus	1–0	Estonia
Violari 39'	Report

Limassol

== Goalscorers ==
There have been 5 goals scored in 4 matches, for an average of 1.25 goals per match.

1 goal

- (Cyprus) Foteini Andronikou
- (Cyprus) Antria Kirkini
- (Estonia) Kristina Bannikova
- (Lithuania) Judita Sabatauskaitė
- (Malta) Brenda Borg
