= Teofilo Patini =

Italian painter (1840–1906)

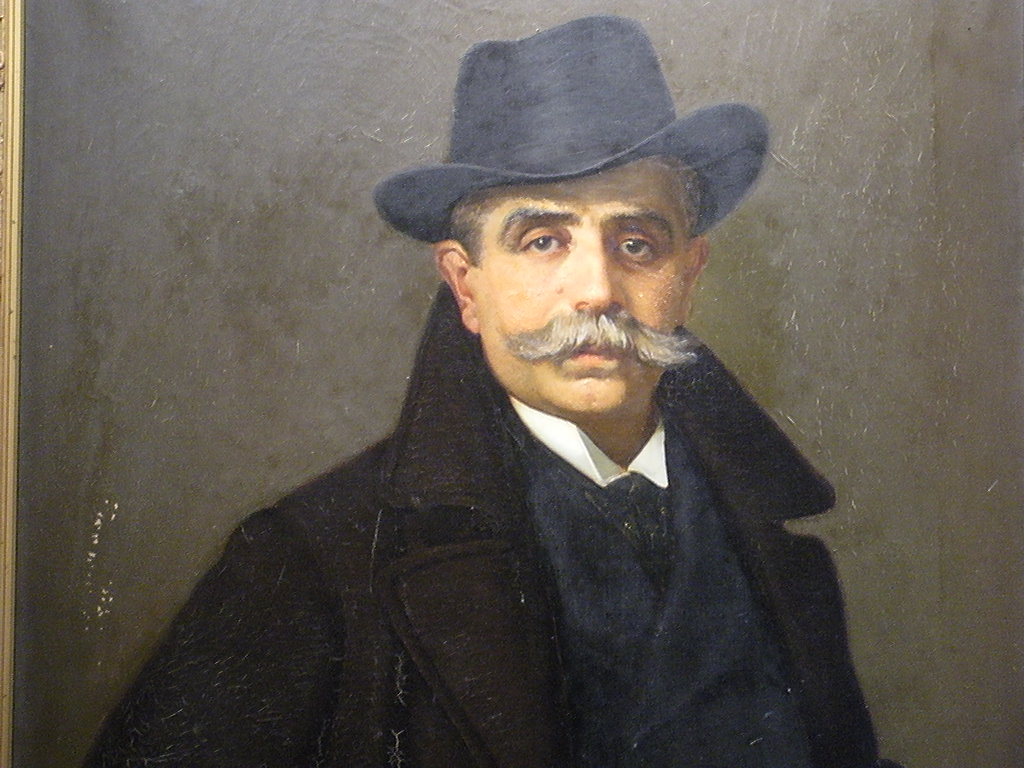
Self-portrait

Teofilo Patini (May 5, 1840 – November 16, 1906) was an Italian painter, active in a Realist style.

== Biography ==
He was born in Castel di Sangro, Abruzzo, to a landowning family of some wealth. In 1855, he began classical studies in Sulmona under the Latin scholar, Leopoldo Dorrucci. Patini's father had taken a position as chancellor of the Royal Judiciary in that town. He acquired a diploma of “Belle Lettere”, and then enrolled in the University of Naples to study philosophy, then transferred to study at the Academy of Fine Arts in Naples. This move, however, was not approved by his family. At the age of 20 years, Teofilo, along with Antonio Tripoti, enlisted in the volunteer forces of Garibaldi: the Cacciatori del Gran Sasso, which was organizing an insurrection in Abruzzo. Later he was to join for four months in the National Guard of Castel di Sangro, with forces attempting to repress the rampant rural brigandage.

During a competition at the Academy, his painting of Edward III of England and the Deputies of Calais won him a stipend for two years (1868 – 1869) to study in Florence. In 1870, his canvas of ‘’La Zingara’’ gained him a scholarship to travel to Rome from 1870 to 1873. In Rome, he painted Nello studio di Salvatore Rosa, which was awarded first prize in an 1872 exhibition in Rome. In Rome, he began a relationship with Teresa Tabasco, a model of the Academy. Years later, they married.

In 1872, he was afflicted with the ophthalmologic infection, trachoma. This curtailed painting to some degree, although he painted La guardiana delle oche (1873), Case di campagna (1874), I notabili del mio paese (1878). A few years later, by the age of 39, he was allowed by his doctor to restart painting. His painting became progressively focused on the lives of the poor peasants, for example, Il ciabattino (exhibited at 1873 Mostra of the Promotrice).

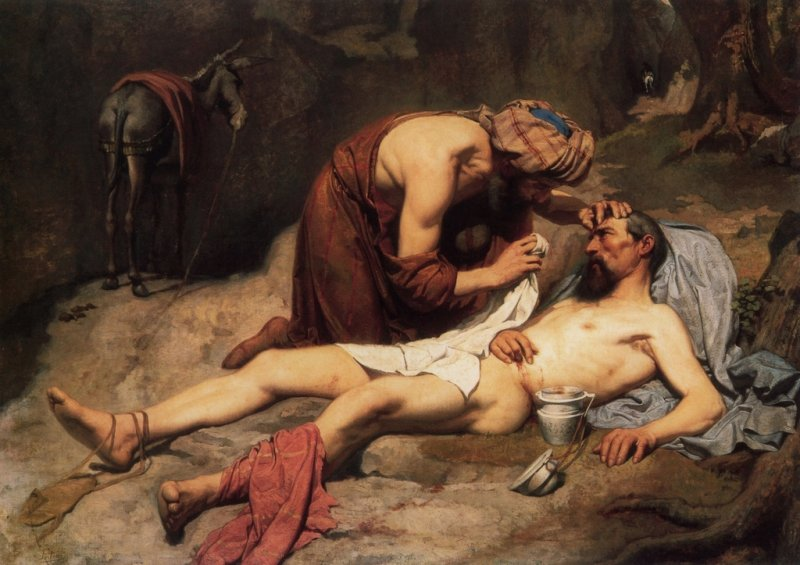
The Good Samaritan

In 1882, he was named director of the Scuola di Arti e Mestieri of L'Aquila. In 1884, he was commissioned by the Ministry of Agriculture to visit the art museums of Germany.

In 1880, at Turin, he exhibited: Ogni buon stivale doventa ciabatta, Lo studio di Salvator Rosa, and La prima lezione di equitazione. In 1881 at Milan he displayed L' Erede. This canvas depicts a peasant, sprawled dead on a mat on the foreground, while to his side, his wife grieves in a corner while her naked baby lies supine. The bleak reality of rural poverty prompted a contemporary critic, to label this a protest work, a legitimate descendant of the Proximus Tuus. The bronze statue by Achille D'Orsi depicts an exhausted peasant, sitting with a hoe. In 1884 at Turin, Patini exhibited Vanga e Latte (a breast-feeding mother and her working man), and finally at Venice: Beasts of burden, in which three peasant women recall the pose and exhaustion of Proximus Tuus, and the paintings of Millet. Other paintings such as The Three Orphans, painted in earthy tones, reiterate this subject matter of empathy with the poor.

Patini struggled financially as a painter. He developed cardiac ailments in later decades. In addition to his genre subjects, and despite some anticlerical positions, he also painted sacred subjects: for San Demetrio ne’ Vestini in Calascio, for the Sanctuary of the Madonna della Libera in Pratola Peligna, for the Duomo and the church of Santa Maria della Concezione at L’Aquila. he painted canvases of the Crucifix for the basilica of San Pelino, near Corfinio; Il Purgatorio o Redenzione, The Guardian Angel, St Carlo Borromeo among the plague victims, L’Immacolata e Santi.

He died in 1906 in Naples. His native town of Castel di Sangro has a stadium and a school (liceo), named after the painter.
