= Aphrodite Women Cup =

- Founded: 2015
- Region: Cyprus
- Teams: 6
- Current champions: Cyprus (1st title)
- 2019 Aphrodite Women Cup

The Aphrodite Women Cup is a global invitational tournament for national teams in women's association football. It has been held annually in Cyprus since 2015. As the competition takes place in Cyprus, the hosts won the competition for the first time in 2019.

It is played at the same time as the Algarve Cup, the Cyprus Women's Cup, the SheBelieves Cup and the Turkish Women's Cup.

== Format ==
The Aphrodite Women Cup uses the following two-phase format:

The first phase is a group stage in which the twelve invited teams are divided into three groups of four teams. Similar to the Algarve Cup, the teams in Group A and Group B consist of higher-ranked teams and are the only teams actually in contention for the championship; Group C consists of lower-ranked teams. Each group plays a round-robin of six games, with each team playing one match against each of the other teams in the same group.

The second phase is a single "finals day" in which six games involving all twelve teams are played to determine the tournament's final standings, with the match-ups as follows:

- 1st place match: Winners of Groups A and B.
- 3rd place match: Runners up of Groups A and B.
- 5th place match: Third placed of Groups A and B.

== Results ==
Year	Final			Third place match		
Year	Winner	Score	Runner-up	Third place	Score	Fourth place
2015	Greece	2–0	Cyprus	Malta	2–0	Latvia
2016	Israel	Round Robin	Cyprus	Malta	Round Robin	Estonia
2017	Latvia	0–0 (5–4 p)	Estonia	Lithuania	1–1 (3–1 p)	Malta
2018	Not Held					
2019	Cyprus	Round Robin	Malta	Estonia	Round Robin	Lithuania

== 2015 ==
Notes: Azerbaijan replaced Qatar, who withdrew.

=== Group A ===
Pos	Team	Pld	W	D	L	GF	GA	GD	Pts	Qualification
1	Greece	3	3	0	0	25	1	+24	9	Final
2	Latvia	3	2	0	1	9	4	+5	6	Third place play-off
3	United Arab Emirates	3	1	0	2	3	9	−6	3	Fifth place play-off
4	Lebanon	3	0	0	3	0	23	−23	0	Seventh place play-off

Source: https://www.cfa.com.cy/Gr/news/21885
12 March 2015

Greece	14–0	Lebanon

12 March 2015

Latvia	2–0	United Arab Emirates

13 March 2015

Greece	7–0	United Arab Emirates

13 March 2015

Lebanon	0–6	Latvia

15 March 2015

United Arab Emirates	3–0	Lebanon

15 March 2015

Latvia	1–4	Greece

=== Group B ===
Pos	Team	Pld	W	D	L	GF	GA	GD	Pts	Qualification
1	Cyprus (H)	3	3	0	0	4	1	+3	9	Final
2	Malta	3	1	1	1	4	4	0	4	Third place play-off
3	Azerbaijan	3	1	0	2	5	3	+2	3	Fifth place play-off
4	Bahrain	3	0	1	2	1	6	−5	1	Seventh place play-off

Source: https://www.cfa.com.cy/Gr/news/21885
(H) Hosts
12 March 2015

Bahrain	0–1	Cyprus

12 March 2015

Malta	2–1	Azerbaijan

13 March 2015

Bahrain	0–4	Azerbaijan

13 March 2015

Cyprus	2–1	Malta

15 March 2015

Azerbaijan	0–1	Cyprus

15 March 2015

Malta	1–1	Bahrain

=== Placements ===
18 March 2015

Cyprus	0–2	Greece

18 March 2015

Malta	2–0	Latvia

18 March 2015

Azerbaijan	5–1	United Arab Emirates

18 March 2015

Bahrain	3–1	Lebanon

== 2016 ==
Pos	Team	Pld	W	D	L	GF	GA	GD	Pts	Qualification
1	Israel	4	3	1	0	6	1	+5	10	Winners
2	Cyprus	4	3	0	1	5	2	+3	9	
3	Malta	4	1	1	2	5	5	0	4	
4	Estonia	4	1	0	3	3	5	−2	3	
5	Lithuania	4	1	0	3	4	10	−6	3	

Source: https://www.cfa.com.cy/Gr/news/25806
10 March 2016

Lithuania	1–3	Cyprus

10 March 2016

Malta	1–1	Israel

11 March 2016

Malta	2–3	Lithuania

11 March 2016

Cyprus	1–0	Estonia

13 March 2016

Israel	2–0	Lithuania

13 March 2016

Estonia	0–2	Malta

15 March 2016

Israel	2–0	Estonia

15 March 2016

Malta	0–1	Cyprus

16 March 2016

Estonia	3–0	Lithuania

16 March 2016

Cyprus	0–1	Israel

== 2017 ==
=== Group A ===
Pos	Team	Pld	W	D	L	GF	GA	GD	Pts	Qualification
1	Latvia	2	2	0	0	3	1	+2	6	Final
2	Malta	2	1	0	1	2	2	0	3	Third place play-off
3	Cyprus	2	0	0	2	2	4	−2	0	Fifth place play-off

Source: https://www.fastscore.com/world/aphrodite-cup_2017
11 March 2017

Malta	0–1	Latvia

12 March 2017

Cyprus	1–2	Latvia

13 March 2017

Cyprus	1–2	Malta

=== Group B ===
Pos	Team	Pld	W	D	L	GF	GA	GD	Pts	Qualification
1	Estonia	2	1	1	0	3	0	+3	4	Final
2	Lithuania	2	1	1	0	2	0	+2	4	Third place play-off
3	Bahrain	2	0	0	2	0	5	−5	0	Fifth place play-off

Source: https://www.fastscore.com/world/aphrodite-cup_2017
11 March 2017

Estonia	3–0	Bahrain

12 March 2017

Lithuania	2–0	Bahrain

13 March 2017

Estonia	0–0	Lithuania

=== Placements ===
15 March 2017

Latvia	0–0 (5–4 p)	Estonia

15 March 2017

Lithuania	1–1 (3–1 p)	Malta

15 March 2017

Cyprus	7–1	Bahrain
