= Judita Sabatauskaitė =

Lithuanian footballer

Personal information
- Date of birth: 23 May 2002 (age 24)
- Position: Midfielder

Senior career*
Years	Team	Apps	(Gls)
2015–2018 2018	MFK Jonava; MFK Žalgiris		

International career^{‡}
2018	Lithuania	5	(1)
- * Club domestic league appearances and goals as of 2 May 2020 ‡ National team caps and goals as of 2 May 2020

Judita Sabatauskaitė (born 23 May 2002) is a Lithuanian footballer who plays as a midfielder and has appeared for the Lithuania women's national team.

== Career ==
Sabatauskaitė has been capped for the Lithuania national team. She scored her first senior international goal against Cyprus during 2019 Aphrodite Women Cup.

== International goals ==
No.	Date	Venue	Opponent	Score	Result	Competition
1.	27 February 2019	Limassol, Cyprus	Cyprus	1–2	1–2	2019 Aphrodite Women Cup
2.	12 April 2022	LFF Stadium, Vilnius, Lithuania	Moldova	3–0	4–0	2023 FIFA Women's World Cup qualification
3.	13 November 2022	Stade Municipal, Rumelange, Lithuania	Luxembourg	3–1	3–2	Friendly
4.	17 February 2023	Yerevan Football Academy, Yerevan, Armenia	Armenia	1–0	3–1	Friendly
