= Riola Xhemaili =

Swiss footballer (born 2003)

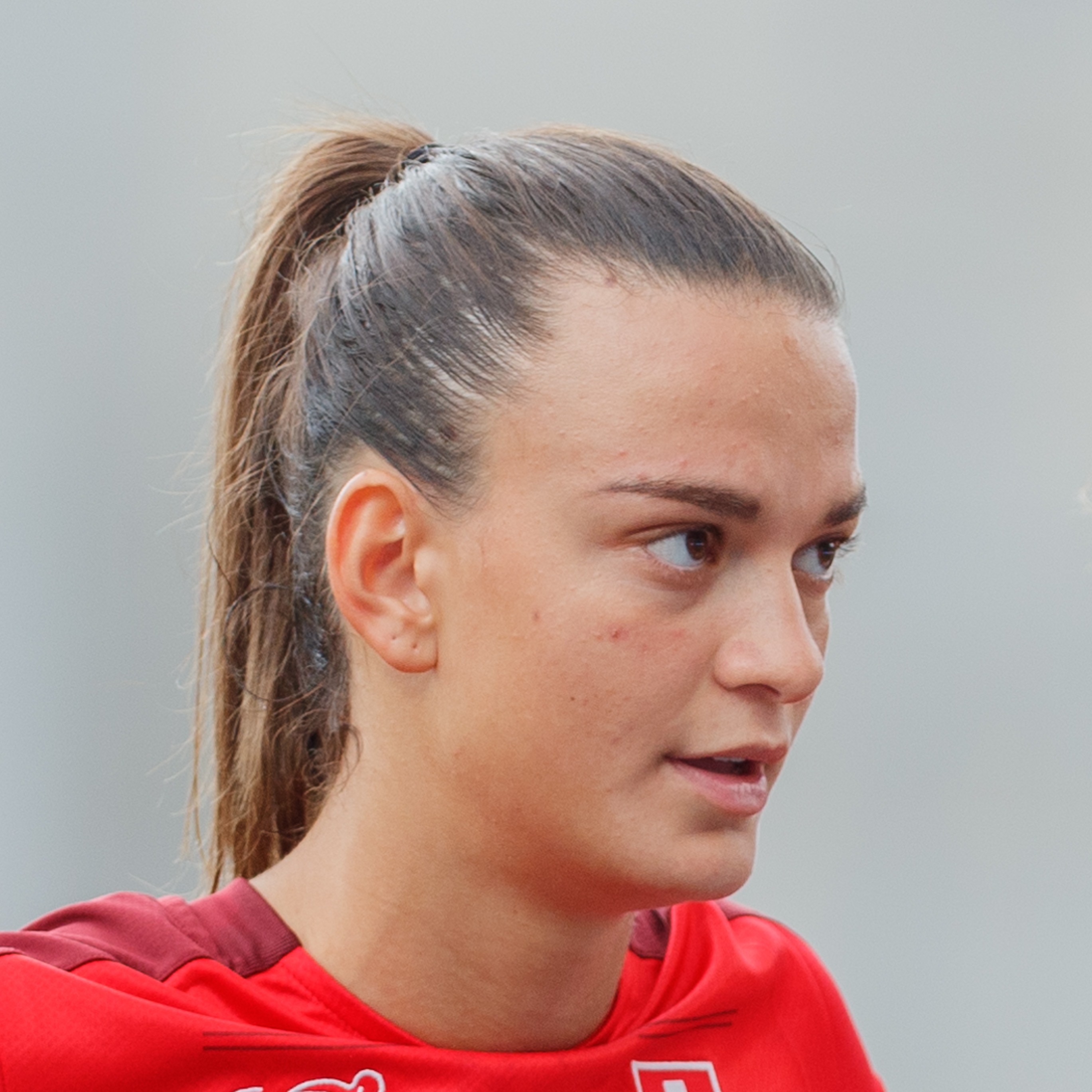
- Xhemaili in 2022

Personal information
- Date of birth: 5 March 2003 (age 23)
- Place of birth: Solothurn, Switzerland
- Height: 1.72 m (5 ft 8 in)
- Position: Attacking midfielder

Team information
- Current team: Como 1907
- Number: 10

Youth career
- 2013–2018: Solothurn
- 2018–2019: Basel

Senior career*
Years	Team	Apps	(Gls)
2019–2021	Basel	52	(27)
2021–2023	SC Freiburg	42	(4)
2023	VfL Wolfsburg II	1	(0)
2023–2025	VfL Wolfsburg	12	(1)
2024–2025	→ PSV (loan)	22	(10)
2025–2026	PSV	22	(14)
2026–	Como 1907	0	(0)

International career^{‡}
2018–2019	Switzerland U16	6	(3)
2019–2020	Switzerland U17	4	(1)
2019–2020	Switzerland U19	5	(3)
2020–	Switzerland	45	(12)
- * Club domestic league appearances and goals as of 14 July 2026 ‡ National team caps and goals as of 13 October 2026

Riola Xhemaili (born 5 March 2003) is a Swiss professional footballer who plays as an attacking midfielder for Serie A Women club Como 1907 and the Switzerland national team.

== Club career ==
Xhemaili is a youth academy graduate of Basel. In June 2021, she joined German club SC Freiburg. On 4 April 2023, VfL Wolfsburg announced the signing of Xhemaili on a three-year contract until June 2026.

On 8 August 2024, Xhemaili extended her contract with Wolfsburg until June 2027. On the same day, she joined Eredivisie club PSV on a season long loan deal. On 24 June 2025, Xhemaili secured a permanent move to PSV by signing a three-year contract.

On 14 July 2026, Xhemaili joined Italian club Como 1907.

== International career ==
Xhemaili made her debut for the Switzerland national team on 22 September 2020 against Belgium, coming on as a substitute for Ramona Bachmann. On 23 June 2025, Xhemaili was called up to the Switzerland squad for the UEFA Women's Euro 2025.

Xhemaili scored Switzerland's opening goal in their 2–0 win against Northern Ireland in the opening game of their 2027 FIFA Women's World Cup qualification campaign on 3 March 2026.

== Personal life ==
Xhemaili has an older sister and a twin brother, Rion. Her father and two of her uncles were also footballers. From under 11 to under 15 level, she played football in midfield alongside Rion for local club Solothurn.

== Career statistics ==
=== International ===
As of match played 13 October 2026

Appearances and goals by national team and year
National team	Year	Apps	Goals
Switzerland	2020	2	0
Switzerland	2021	9	2
Switzerland	2022	8	3
Switzerland	2023	5	0
Switzerland	2024	5	0
Switzerland	2025	9	2
Switzerland	2026	7	5
Total		45	12

Scores and results list Switzerland's goal tally first, score column indicates score after each Xhemaili goal.

List of international goals scored by Riola Xhemaili
No.	Date	Venue	Opponent	Score	Result	Competition
1	21 September 2021	Zimbru Stadium, Chișinău, Moldova	Moldova	5–0	6–0	2023 FIFA Women's World Cup qualification
2	30 November 2021	LFF Stadium, Vilnius, Lithuania	Lithuania	6–0	7–0	2023 FIFA Women's World Cup qualification
3	6 September 2022	Stade de la Tuilière, Lausanne, Switzerland	Moldova	9–0	15–0	2023 FIFA Women's World Cup qualification
4	6 September 2022	Stade de la Tuilière, Lausanne, Switzerland	Moldova	12–0	15–0	2023 FIFA Women's World Cup qualification
5	6 September 2022	Stade de la Tuilière, Lausanne, Switzerland	Moldova	14–0	15–0	2023 FIFA Women's World Cup qualification
6	26 June 2025	Stadion Schützenwiese, Winterthur, Switzerland	Czech Republic	1–0	4–1	Friendly
7	10 July 2025	Stade de Genève, Geneva, Switzerland	Finland	1–1	1–1	UEFA Women's Euro 2025
8	3 March 2026	Stade de la Tuilière, Lausanne, Switzerland	Northern Ireland	1–0	2–0	2027 FIFA Women's World Cup qualification
9	5 June 2026	Cornaredo Stadium, Lugano, Switzerland	Malta	3–1	6–1	2027 FIFA Women's World Cup qualification
10	5 June 2026	Cornaredo Stadium, Lugano, Switzerland	Malta	6–1	6–1	2027 FIFA Women's World Cup qualification
11	9 October 2026	Mezőkövesdi Városi Stadion, Mezőkövesd, Hungary	Israel	4–3	7–3	2027 FIFA Women's World Cup qualification – UEFA play-offs
12	9 October 2026	Mezőkövesdi Városi Stadion, Mezőkövesd, Hungary	Israel	5–3	7–3	2027 FIFA Women's World Cup qualification – UEFA play-offs
