= Svenja Fölmli =

Swiss footballer (born 2002)

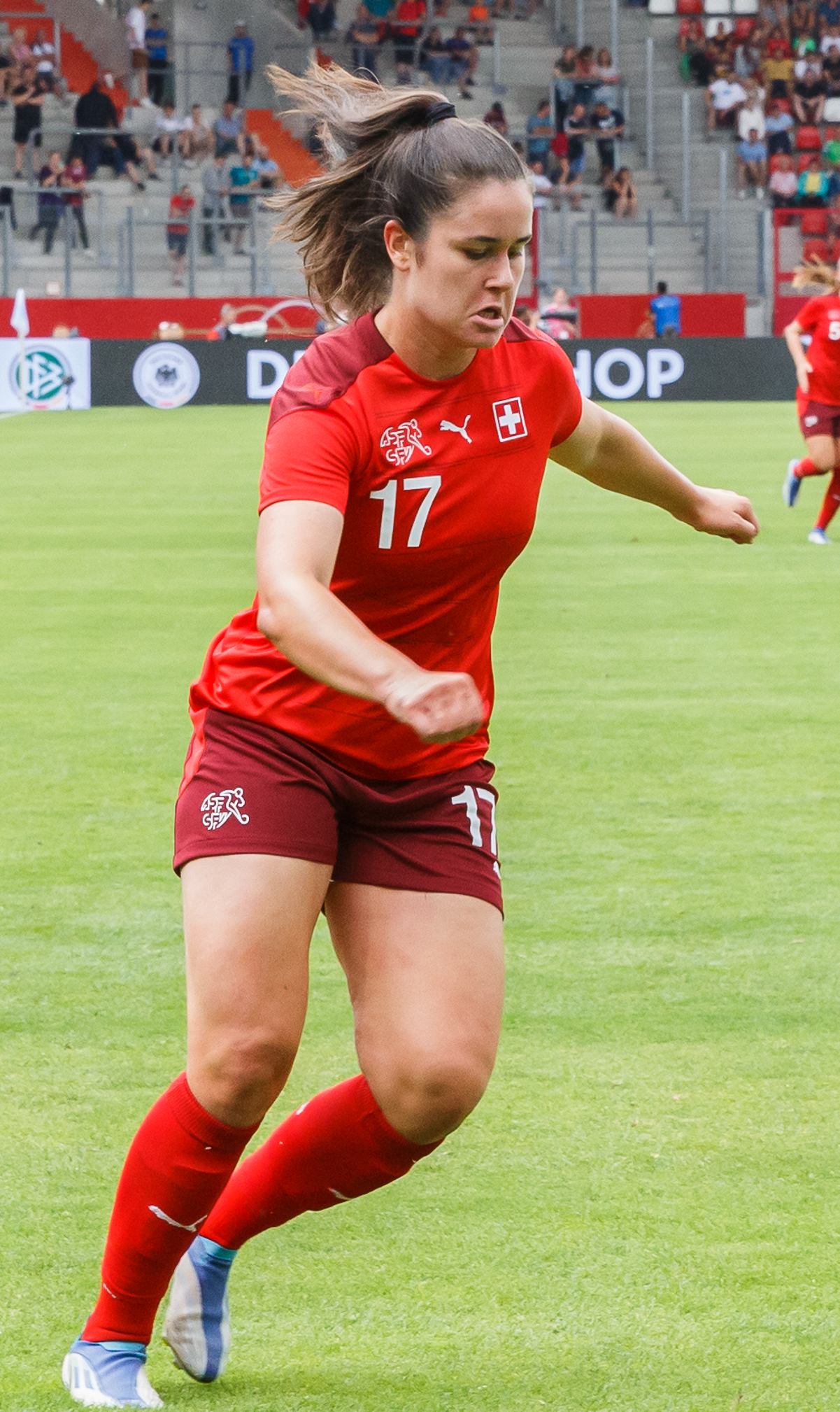
- Fölmli with Switzerland in 2022

Personal information
- Full name: Svenja Julia Fölmli
- Date of birth: 19 August 2002 (age 24)
- Place of birth: Sursee, Switzerland
- Height: 1.70 m (5 ft 7 in)
- Position: Forward

Team information
- Current team: TSG 1899 Hoffenheim
- Number: 19

Senior career*
Years	Team	Apps	(Gls)
2018–2021	Luzern	56	(29)
2021–2026	SC Freiburg	65	(21)
2026–	TSG 1899 Hoffenheim	10	(2)

International career^{‡}
2018	Switzerland U17	4	(1)
2018–2019	Switzerland U19	13	(9)
2019–	Switzerland	35	(7)
- * Club domestic league appearances and goals as of 14 November 2026 ‡ National team caps and goals as of 14 October 2026

Svenja Julia Fölmli (born 19 August 2002) is a Swiss footballer who plays as a forward for TSG 1899 Hoffenheim and the Switzerland national team. Her playing style has drawn comparisons with Kylian Mbappé.

== International career ==
Fölmli made her debut for the Switzerland national team on 3 September 2019 against Lithuania, coming on as a substitute for Fabienne Humm.

On 23 June 2025, Fölmli was called up to the Switzerland squad for the UEFA Women's Euro 2025.

== International goals ==
No.	Date	Venue	Opponent	Score	Result	Competition
1.	12 November 2019	LIPO Park Schaffhausen, Schaffhausen, Switzerland	Romania	6–0	6–0	UEFA Women's Euro 2022 qualifying
2.	17 September 2021	Stockhorn Arena, Thun, Switzerland	Lithuania	4–1	4–1	2023 FIFA Women's World Cup qualification
3.	21 September 2021	Zimbru Stadium, Chișinău, Moldova	Moldova	4–0	4–0	2023 FIFA Women's World Cup qualification
4.	30 November 2021	LFF Stadium, Vilnius, Lithuania	Lithuania	7–0	7–0	2023 FIFA Women's World Cup qualification
5.	26 June 2025	Stadion Schützenwiese, Winterthur, Switzerland	Czech Republic	4–1	4–1	Friendly
6.	3 March 2026	Stade de la Tuilière, Lausanne, Switzerland	Northern Ireland	2–0	2–0	2027 FIFA Women's World Cup qualification
7.	7 March 2026	Centenary Stadium, Ta' Qali, Malta	Malta	3–1	4–1	2027 FIFA Women's World Cup qualification
