= Ana Jelenčić =

Croatian footballer (born 1994)

Personal information
- Date of birth: 8 June 1994 (age 32)
- Place of birth: Krizevci, Croatia
- Height: 1.70 m (5 ft 7 in)
- Position: Left back

Team information
- Current team: Servette Chênois
- Number: 18

Youth career
- ŽNK Plamen Križevci

Senior career*
Years	Team	Apps	(Gls)
2010–2012	ŽNK Dinamo-Maksimir		
2012–2013	ŽNK Agram		
2013–2014	ŽNK Osijek		
2014–2015	BV Cloppenburg	6	(0)
2015–2016	Zagłębie Lubin	26	(1)
2016–2017	Gintra-Universitetas		
2017	AZS PWSZ Wałbrzych		
2017–2019	Górnik Łęczna	48	(2)
2019	Avaldsnes IL	8	(0)
2020	Sporting Huelva	1	(0)
2020–2022	Hellas Verona	40	(2)
2022–2023	Parma	20	(0)
2023–	Servette	27	(1)

International career^{‡}
2010	Croatia U17	3	(0)
2010–2011	Croatia U19	6	(2)
2011–	Croatia	57	(1)
- * Club domestic league appearances and goals as of 22:03, 26 November 2024 (UTC) ‡ National team caps and goals as of 22:03, 26 November 2024 (UTC)

Ana Jelenčić (born 8 June 1994) is a Croatian professional footballer who plays as a left back for Servette Chênois and the Croatia women's national team.

== Club career ==
Jelenčić joined a women's football team as a complete beginner when she was 13 years old. As a young player she spent a short, unhappy spell at BV Cloppenburg of the 2. Frauen-Bundesliga, then moved to Poland on the recommendation of her Croatian team-mate Leonarda Balog. In 26 Ekstraliga Kobiet appearances for Zagłębie Lubin, Jelenčić scored one goal and received eight yellow cards. She then moved to Lithuanian UEFA Women's Champions League contestants Gintra-Universitetas, before returning to Polish football with AZS PWSZ Wałbrzych in February 2017.

Although she was successful in Poland, Jelenčić transferred to Norwegian Toppserien club Avaldsnes IL in 2019 because she wanted to test herself at a higher level and earn better wages. She was soon unhappy with the shortage of first-team football, so moved to Sporting Huelva. Her appearances were curtailed by the COVID-19 pandemic in Spain.

Jelenčić made her league debut for Parma against Inter Milan on 28 August 2022.

On 16 July 2020, Jelenčić was announced at Hellas Verona on a contract until 30 June 2021. On 24 July 2021, she signed a contract extension until 30 June 2022.

On 17 July 2023, Jelenčić was announced at Servette on a contract until 2025. She made her league debut against Luzern on 26 August 2023. Jelenčić scored her first league goal against Thun on 14 September 2024, scoring in the 86th minute.

== International career ==
Jelenčić has been capped for the Croatia national team, appearing for the team during the 2019 FIFA Women's World Cup qualifying cycle.

Jelenčić progressed through the national youth teams where she had enjoyed working with the coach Dean Klafurić. She made her senior national team debut in May 2011, as a substitute in a 1–1 draw with Hungary. Jelenčić scored her first international goal against Moldova on 30 November 2021, scoring in the 76th minute.

Jelenčić was part of the team that was called up for the 2020 Cyprus Women's Cup.

Jelenčić was part of the team that was called up for the 2023 Cyprus Women's Cup.

== International ==
List of international goals scored by Ana Jelenčić
No.	Date	Venue	Opponent	Score	Result	Competition
1	30 November 2021	Stadion Aldo Drosina, Pula, Croatia	Moldova	4–0	4–0	Women's World Cup qualifying

== Honours ==
Górnik Łęczna

- Ekstraliga: 2017–18, 2018–19
- Polish Cup: 2017–18
