= Valentina Bergamaschi =

Italian footballer (born 1997)

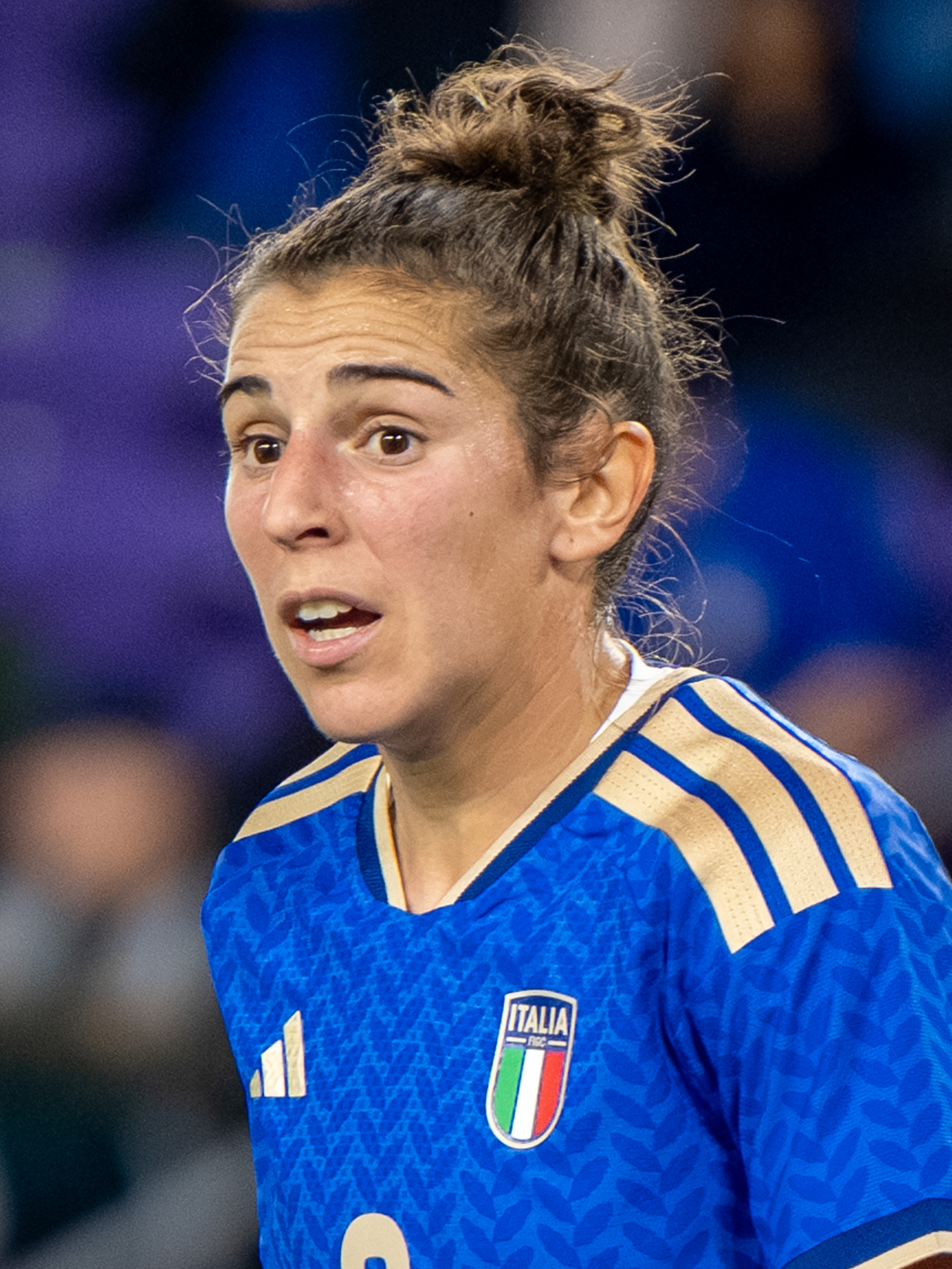
- Bergamaschi with Italy in 2025

Personal information
- Date of birth: 22 January 1997 (age 29)
- Place of birth: Varese, Italy
- Height: 1.68 m (5 ft 6 in)
- Position: Midfielder

Team information
- Current team: AS Roma
- Number: 23

Senior career*
Years	Team	Apps	(Gls)
2011–2014	Alto Verbano		
2014–2015	Rapid Lugano		
2015–2016	Lugano 1976		
2016–2017	Neunkirch		(20)
2017–2018	Brescia	14	(7)
2018–2024	AC Milan	119	(16)
2024–2025	Juventus	19	(4)
2025–	Roma	21	(2)

International career^{‡}
2016–	Italy	69	(9)
- * Club domestic league appearances and goals as of 24 August 2026 ‡ National team caps and goals as of 11 October 2026

Valentina Bergamaschi (Italian: [valenˈtiːna berɡaˈmaski]; born 22 January 1997) is an Italian professional footballer who plays for Serie A club AS Roma and the Italy women's national team. She mainly plays as a right-sided midfielder but can also play as a winger or a right-back.

She started her career in Switzerland, playing for Rapid Lugano, FF Lugano 1976 and FC Neunkirch, before returning to Italy to play for ACF Brescia Femminile. With Neunkirch she won the Nationalliga A championship and the Swiss Women's Cup, both in the 2016–2017 season.

A member of the senior Italy women's national football team since 2016, Bergamaschi also has third place medals from the 2014 UEFA Women's Under-17 Championship and the 2014 FIFA U-17 Women's World Cup.

== Club career ==
Bergamaschi, who was born in Varese but grew up and lived with her parents in Cittiglio, began competitive activity by joining FC Caravate, a club that promotes football in the homonymous Italian town, playing with boys from the age of nine years old.

In May 2011, Bergamaschi was called up to the representative under-15 team of Lombardy to participate in the Torneo delle Regioni (Tournament of the Regions) held in Chianciano Terme from 26 June to 3 July 2011. During the tournament, which the representative of Lombardy won by beating the Veneto in the final, Bergamaschi scored one of the goals and was noticed by the selectors of the Italy women's national under-17 football team, being called at the end of the tournament for a training camp with coaches Enrico Sbardella and Rita Guarino.

As a promising young player from Lombardy, Bergamaschi was contacted by a number of football clubs in higher divisions, but decided to sign for Alto Verbano, a club that was about to compete in the 2011–2012 Serie D Italian regional Championship, then at the lowly fifth level of Italian women's football. With Bergamaschi showing her qualities from the first match of the season Alto Verbano topped the league table, and retained their position until the end of the championship, gaining promotion to Serie C for 2012–2013.

During the 2014 summer transfer market, she joined Rapid Lugano of the Swiss Nationalliga B. Bergamaschi helped the club secure promotion to Nationalliga A at the end of the 2014–2015 season. Before the start of 2015–2016, the women's team left the men's club, becoming Lugano 1976. Bergamaschi decided to remain with the newly independent club for the following season. Ahead of the 2016–17 campaign, she transferred to FC Neunkirch.

She won a league and Swiss Women's Cup double in the 2016–2017 season with Neunkirch and also finished as top scorer in the league with 24 goals. But in June 2017, she became a free agent when Neunkirch withdrew from the Swiss championship and folded. In early July, she came back to Italy to join Brescia, gaining her first opportunity to play in Serie A.

=== AC Milan ===
In July 2018 she signed as a full-time contract with newly formed A.C. Milan Women, who had obtained Brescia's Serie A playing licence.

=== Juventus ===
On 25 June 2024, Bergamaschi signed a three-year contract with Juventus.

== International career ==
She was called into the senior national team for the 2016 International Women's Football Tournament of Manaus.

Bergamaschi was called up to the Italy squad for the 2019 FIFA Women's World Cup.

On 26 June 2022, Bergamaschi was announced in the Italy squad for the UEFA Women's Euro 2022.

On 25 June 2025, Bergamaschi was called up to the Italy squad for the UEFA Women's Euro 2025.

== International goals ==
No.	Date	Venue	Opponent	Score	Result	Competition
1.	7 December 2016	Arena da Amazônia, Manaus, Brazil	Russia	2–0	3–0	Torneio Internacional 2016
2.	15 September 2017	Stadio Alberto Picco, La Spezia, Italy	Moldova	4–0	5–0	2019 FIFA Women's World Cup qualification
3.	28 February 2018	Antonis Papadopoulos Stadium, Larnaca, Cyprus	Switzerland	2–0	3–0	2018 Cyprus Women's Cup
4.	27 February 2019	Antonis Papadopoulos Stadium, Larnaca, Cyprus	Mexico	1–0	5–0	2019 Cyprus Women's Cup
5.	8 April 2022	Stadio Ennio Tardini, Parma, Italy	Lithuania	2–0	7–0	2023 FIFA Women's World Cup qualification
6.	8 April 2022	Stadio Ennio Tardini, Parma, Italy	Lithuania	7–0	7–0	2023 FIFA Women's World Cup qualification
7.	1 July 2022	Stadio Teofilo Patini, Castel di Sangro, Italy	Spain	1–0	1–1	Friendly
8.	14 July 2022	New York Stadium, Rotherham, England	Iceland	1–1	1–1	UEFA Women's Euro 2022
9.	5 June 2026	Arena Garibaldi, Pisa, Italy	Serbia	1–0	3–0	2027 FIFA Women's World Cup qualification

== Honours ==
FC Neunkirch

- Nationalliga A: Winner 2017
- Swiss Women's Cup: Winner 2017

Brescia Calcio Femminile

- Italian Women's Super Cup: Winner 2017

== Statistics ==
Here is list of teams and seasons in which Valentina Bergamaschi has played. It includes the total number of appearances (caps), substitution details, goals, yellow and red cards.

Competition	Season	Team								
Women's Euro qualifiers	2021	Italy	462	6	1	1	0	0	0	0
Coppa Italia	2020/2021	AC Milan	90	1	0	0	0	0	1	0
Serie A	2020/2021	AC Milan	1549	18	0	5	2	0	1	0
Algarve Cup	2020	Italy	0	0	0	0	0	0	0	0
Coppa Italia	2019/2020	AC Milan	0	0	0	0	0	0	0	0
Serie A	2019/2020	AC Milan	1341	15	0	1	1	0	3	0
International friendlies	2019	Italy	330	5	2	1	0	0	1	0
Cyprus International Tournament	2019	Italy	190	3	1	2	1	0	0	0
Women's World Cup	2019	Italy	307	5	1	4	0	0	0	0
Serie A	2018/2019	AC Milan	886	13	1	6	2	0	0	0
International friendlies	2018	Italy	0	1	1	0	0	0	0	0
Champions League	2017/2018	Brescia	0	1	0	0	0	0	0	0
