= Stadio Teofilo Patini =

Football stadium in Castel di Sangro, Italy

- Il Patini
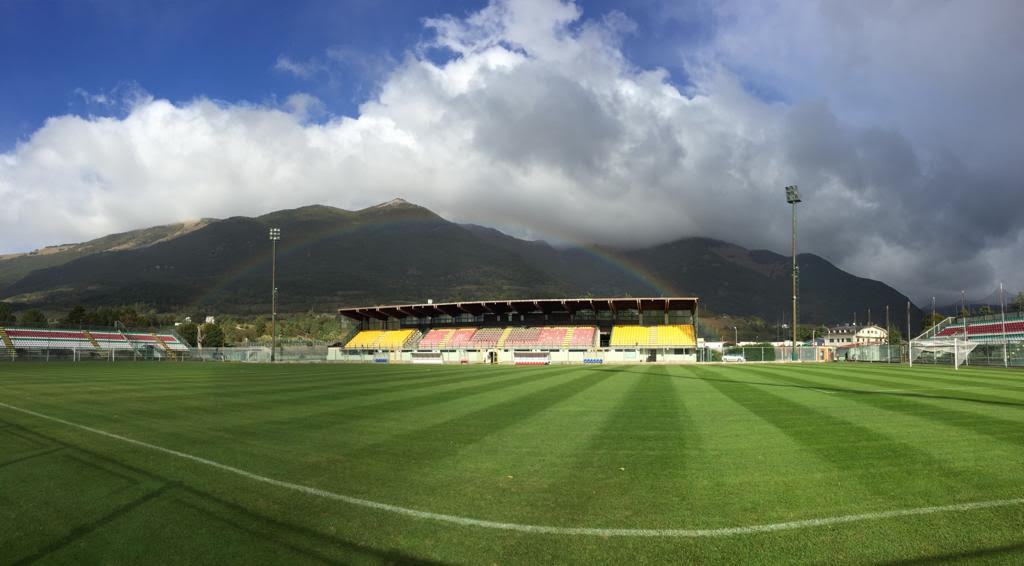
- Interactive map of Stadio Teofilo Patini
- Location: Castel di Sangro, Italy
- Coordinates: 41.7795°N 14.1027°E
- Owner: Comune di Castel di Sangro
- Capacity: 7,220
- Surface: Grass

Construction
- Groundbreaking: 1996
- Opened: 1996

Tenant
- A.S.D. Castel di Sangro Calcio

Stadio Teofilo Patini is a stadium located in Castel di Sangro, Italy. It is owned by Municipality of Castel di Sangro (Comune di Castel di Sangro), and its primary use is for home games of the A.S.D. Castel di Sangro Calcio. It is also used for pop concerts and other sporting events.

== History ==
The stadium was built for the miracle of the local team, Castel di Sangro Calcio, who were promoted to the Italian Serie B, the second league in Italy.

The stadium was named in honor of Teofilo Patini, a nineteenth century painter from Castel di Sangro.

Until 1996, the stadium comprised only a small sports ground with central stand. Over a period of four months, the current stadium was constructed with four stands and 7,220 seats. In December, 1996 the stadium was inaugurated.

On 23 May 1998, the Patini hosted the Marco Tardelli's Italian National Under -21 Football Team in a match against Scotland (4-0 for Italy was the result), and on 2008 September, 5 the Pierluigi Casiraghi's Italian National Under-21 Football Team played against Greece (1-1) in a qualifying match for the European U-21 of 2009.

In 2025, the stadium introduced lower-cost tickets and disability-accessible areas.
