= Stadion Branko Čavlović-Čavlek =

Football stadium in Karlovac, Croatia

Branko Čavlović-Čavlek
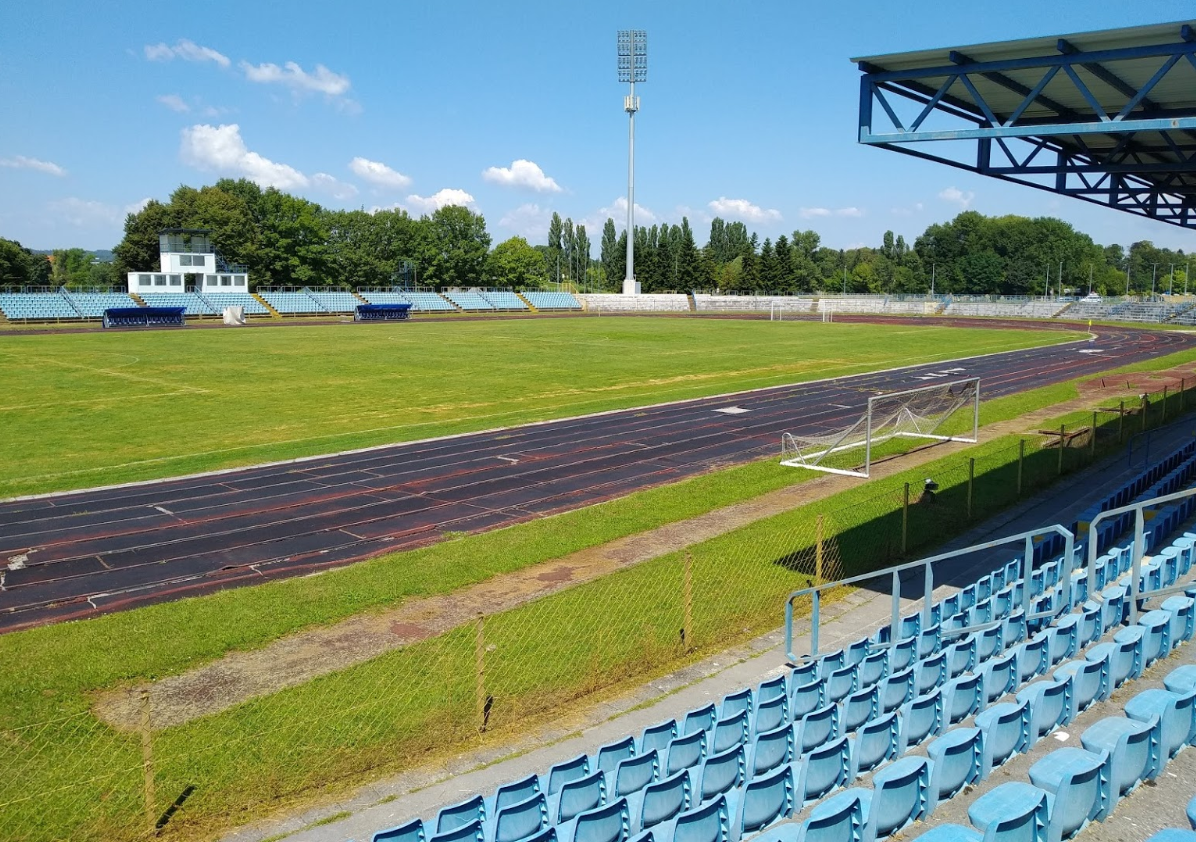
- Interactive map of Branko Čavlović-Čavlek
- Full name: Stadion Branko Čavlović-Čavlek
- Former names: Stadion 13. srpanj (The 13th of July Stadium)
- Location: Mekušansko polje bb, Karlovac
- Coordinates: 45°29′4.19″N 15°33′50.16″E
- Capacity: 12,000
- Surface: Grass
- Field size: 110m x 68m

Construction
- Built: 1975
- Renovated: 2020

Tenant
- NK Karlovac 1919

Stadion Branko Čavlović-Čavlek is a football stadium in Karlovac, Croatia. It serves as home stadium for the NK Karlovac 1919 football club. The stadium was built in 1975 and has a capacity of 12,000 seats. Following NK Karlovac's promotion to Prva HNL the stadium underwent renovations in order to meet top-level requirements in the summer of 2009. The renovated stadium was opened on 19 July 2009 with a friendly match against Queens Park Rangers, which NK Karlovac won 3–1.

The stadium is named after Branko Čavlović (1933–1955), a footballer from Karlovac who was active with local clubs in the 1940s and competed for the Croatian national junior team of that period.
