= 2023 Turkish Women's Cup squads =

List of players competing at the 7th edition of the Turkish Women's Cup

This article lists the squads for the 2023 Turkish Women's Cup, the 7th edition of the Turkish Women's Cup. The cup consisted of a series of friendly games, and was held in Turkey from 13 to 22 February 2023. The six national teams involved in the tournament registered a squad of 23 players.

The age listed for each player is on 13 February 2023, the first day of the tournament. The numbers of caps and goals listed for each player do not include any matches played after the start of tournament. The club listed is the club for which the player last played a competitive match prior to the tournament. The nationality for each club reflects the national association (not the league) to which the club is affiliated. A flag is included for coaches that are of a different nationality than their own national team.

== Group A ==
=== Slovenia ===
Coach: Borut Jarc

The squad was announced on 1 February 2023. Before the start of the tournament Lara Klopčič was replaced by Adrijana Mori.

No.	Pos.	Player	Date of birth (age)	Club
1	GK	Zala Meršnik	7 June 2001 (aged 21)	(Royal Spanish Football Federation) Huelva
2	DF	Lana Golob	26 October 1999 (aged 23)	(Italian Football Federation) Pomigliano
3	DF	Sara Agrež	9 December 2000 (aged 22)	(German Football Association) VfL Wolfsburg
4	DF	Evelina Kos	21 October 1996 (aged 26)	(Football Association of Slovenia) Mura
5	MF	Sara Gradišek	16 July 2003 (aged 19)	(Football Association of Slovenia) Radomlje
6	MF	Kaja Korošec	17 November 2001 (aged 21)	(Football Association of Slovenia) Mura
7	DF	Kristina Erman	28 June 1993 (aged 29)	(Royal Dutch Football Association) Fortuna Sittard
8	MF	Mateja Zver (captain)	15 March 1988 (aged 34)	(Austrian Football Association) St. Pölten
9	FW	Adrijana Mori	17 August 2000 (aged 22)	(German Football Association) Turbine Potsdam
10	MF	Dominika Čonč	1 January 1993 (aged 30)	(Italian Football Federation) Sampdoria
11	FW	Lara Prašnikar	8 August 1998 (aged 24)	(German Football Association) Eintracht Frankfurt
12	GK	Živa Galjot	6 July 2003 (aged 19)	(Football Association of Slovenia) Radomlje
13	MF	Zala Kuštrin	18 June 1998 (aged 24)	(Italian Football Federation) Bologna
14	FW	Špela Kolbl	13 March 1998 (aged 24)	(Football Association of Slovenia) Mura
15	MF	Sara Makovec	31 March 2000 (aged 22)	(Football Association of Slovenia) Olimpija Ljubljana
16	DF	Kaja Eržen	21 August 1994 (aged 28)	(Italian Football Federation) Fiorentina
17	MF	Izabela Križaj	11 May 2000 (aged 22)	(Football Association of Slovenia) Olimpija Ljubljana
18	MF	Manja Rogan	22 October 1995 (aged 27)	(Football Association of Slovenia) Olimpija Ljubljana
19	FW	Ana Milović	31 July 2001 (aged 21)	(Football Association of Slovenia) Olimpija Ljubljana
20	FW	Nika Babnik	17 September 1998 (aged 24)	(Portuguese Football Federation) Albergaria
21	MF	Mirjam Kastelec	10 September 2002 (aged 20)	(Football Association of Slovenia) Ljubljana
22	GK	Ivo Kocijan	10 May 2004 (aged 18)	(Football Association of Slovenia) Mura
23	MF	Luana Zajmi	29 January 2002 (aged 21)	(Croatian Football Federation) Split

=== South Africa ===
Coach: Desiree Ellis

The squad was announced on 6 February 2023.

No.	Pos.	Player	Date of birth (age)	Club
2	DF	Asanda Hadebe	13 October 2003 (aged 19)	(South African Football Association) Sunflower
3	DF	Bongeka Gamede	22 May 1999 (aged 23)	(South African Football Association) UWC
4	DF	Noko Matlou	30 September 1985 (aged 37)	(Royal Spanish Football Federation) Eibar
5	DF	Fikile Magama	19 January 2002 (aged 21)	(South African Football Association) UWC
6	FW	Noxolo Cesane	11 October 2000 (aged 22)	(Mexican Football Federation) Tigres UANL
7	DF	Karabo Dhlamini	18 September 2001 (aged 21)	(South African Football Association) Mamelodi Sundowns
8	FW	Hildah Magaia	16 December 1994 (aged 28)	(Korea Football Association) Sejong Sportstoto
9	FW	Gabriela Salgado	20 February 1998 (aged 24)	(South African Football Association) JVW
10	MF	Linda Motlhalo	1 July 1998 (aged 24)	(Scottish Football Association) Glasgow City
12	FW	Jermaine Seoposenwe	12 October 1993 (aged 29)	(Mexican Football Federation) Juárez
13	DF	Bambanani Mbane	12 March 1990 (aged 32)	(South African Football Association) Mamelodi Sundowns
15	MF	Refiloe Jane (captain)	4 August 1992 (aged 30)	(Italian Football Federation) Sassuolo
16	GK	Andile Dlamini	2 September 1992 (aged 30)	(South African Football Association) Mamelodi Sundowns
17	FW	Melinda Kgadiete	21 July 1992 (aged 30)	(South African Football Association) Mamelodi Sundowns
19	MF	Kholosa Biyana	6 September 1994 (aged 28)	(South African Football Association) UWC
	GK	Kaylin Swart	30 September 1994 (aged 28)	(South African Football Association) JVW
	GK	Regirl Ngobeni	29 February 1996 (aged 26)	(South African Football Association) UWC
	GK	Katlego Moletsane	3 March 1995 (aged 27)	(South African Football Association) Royal AM
	DF	Faith Nokuthula	24 June 2000 (aged 22)	(The Football Association) Blackburn Rovers
	DF	Tiisetso Makhubela	24 April 1997 (aged 25)	(South African Football Association) Mamelodi Sundowns
	MF	Sibulele Holweni	4 August 1992 (aged 30)	(South African Football Association) UWC
	MF	Thalea Smidt	27 December 1997 (aged 25)	(South African Football Association) Mamelodi Sundowns
	MF	Robyn Moodaly	16 June 1994 (aged 28)	(South African Football Association) JVW
	MF	Amogelang Motau	27 February 1997 (aged 25)	(South African Football Association) UWC
	FW	Nthabiseng Majiya	10 June 2004 (aged 18)	(South African Football Association) Richmond United
	FW	Lelona Daweti	8 September 1999 (aged 23)	(South African Football Association) Mamelodi Sundowns

=== Turkey ===
Coach: Necla Güngör

Turkey withdrew before the beginning of the tournament due to the situation caused by the 2023 Turkey–Syria earthquake.

=== Uzbekistan ===
Coach: (Japan) Midori Honda

The squad was announced on 10 February 2023.

No.	Pos.	Player	Date of birth (age)	Caps	Goals	Club
1	GK	Maftuna Jonimqulova	26 July 1999 (aged 23)	10	1	(Uzbekistan Football Association) Sevinch
2	DF	Madina Khikmatova	9 August 2001 (aged 21)	6	1	(Uzbekistan Football Association) Pakhtakor Tashkent
3	MF	Feruza Bobokhujaeva	5 October 1999 (aged 23)	2	0	(Uzbekistan Football Association) Sogdiana Jizzakh
4	FW	Rushaniya Safina	25 November 1993 (aged 29)	7	1	(Uzbekistan Football Association) AGMK
5	DF	Nafisa Nabikulova	20 June 2000 (aged 22)	1	0	(Uzbekistan Football Association) Sogdiana Jizzakh
6	MF	Irodakhon Turdialieva	6 April 1995 (aged 27)	17	0	(Uzbekistan Football Association) Sogdiana Jizzakh
7	MF	Feruza Turdiboeva	6 January 1994 (aged 29)	14	8	(Uzbekistan Football Association) AGMK
8	FW	Ilvina Ablyakimova	27 April 1995 (aged 27)	10	2	(Uzbekistan Football Association) Bunyodkor
9	FW	Makhliyo Sarikova	3 March 1990 (aged 32)	14	9	(Kazakhstan Football Federation) CSHVSM
10	MF	Saida Galimova (captain)	27 March 1989 (aged 33)	8	1	(Uzbekistan Football Association) Bunyodkor
11	DF	Maftuna Shoyimova	1 January 1999 (aged 24)	28	6	(Uzbekistan Football Association) Sevinch
12	GK	Kumushoy Gulomova	6 November 1999 (aged 23)	1	0	(Uzbekistan Football Association) Sogdiana Jizzakh
13	GK	Sevara Nurullaeva	4 April 2002 (aged 20)	0	0	(Uzbekistan Football Association) Sevinch
14	MF	Gulzoda Amirova	13 October 1999 (aged 23)	7	1	(Uzbekistan Football Association) Sevinch
15	MF	Umida Zoirova	22 April 1998 (aged 24)	23	2	(Uzbekistan Football Association) Bunyodkor
16	MF	Ruzikhon Askarova	20 December 1999 (aged 23)	5	0	(Uzbekistan Football Association) Metallurg Bekabad
17	FW	Lyudmila Karachik	8 December 1994 (aged 28)	17	20	(Uzbekistan Football Association) Bunyodkor
18	FW	Aziza Norboeva	12 December 1996 (aged 26)	17	3	(Uzbekistan Football Association) Bunyodkor
20	DF	Kamila Zaripova	19 November 1998 (aged 24)	24	1	(Uzbekistan Football Association) AGMK
21	DF	Shokhida Tojiddinova	21 February 1999 (aged 23)	8	0	(Uzbekistan Football Association) AGMK
22	MF	Madina Vokhidova	11 March 1997 (aged 25)	3	0	(Uzbekistan Football Association) Qizilqum Zarafshon
23	FW	Diyorakhon Khabibullaeva	15 September 1999 (aged 23)	20	12	(Uzbekistan Football Association) Sogdiana Jizzakh
24	FW	Zarina Mamatkarimova	4 March 2004 (aged 18)	5	4	(Uzbekistan Football Association) Sogdiana Jizzakh

=== Venezuela ===
Coach: (Italy) Pamela Conti

On 10 February 2023, it was announced that the team withdrew from the tournament, in solidarity with Turkey and Syria due to the unfortunate situation of earthquakes.

=== Zambia ===
Coach: Bruce Mwape

A preliminary squad was announced on 1 February 2023. The final squad was announced on 10 February 2023.

No.	Pos.	Player	Date of birth (age)	Caps	Goals	Club
1	GK	Catherine Musonda	20 February 1998 (aged 24)	3	0	(Football Association of Zambia) Indeni Roses
2	DF	Judith Soko	31 March 2004 (aged 18)	0	0	(Football Association of Zambia) YASA
3	DF	Lushomo Mweemba	10 April 2001 (aged 21)	27	1	(Football Association of Zambia) Green Buffaloes
4	DF	Esther Siamfuko	8 August 2004 (aged 18)	4	0	(Football Association of Zambia) Green Buffaloes
5	DF	Pauline Zulu		0	0	(Football Association of Zambia) Elite Ladies
6	MF	Mary Wilombe	22 September 1997 (aged 25)	7	0	(Football Association of Zambia) Red Arrows
7	MF	Misozi Zulu	11 October 1994 (aged 28)	7	0	(Turkish Football Federation) Hakkarigücü Spor
8	DF	Margaret Belemu	24 February 1997 (aged 25)	26	2	(Turkish Football Federation) Hakkarigücü Spor
9	MF	Hellen Mubanga	23 May 1995 (aged 27)	6	0	(Royal Spanish Football Federation) Zaragoza CFF
10	FW	Grace Chanda	11 June 1997 (aged 25)	28	10	(Royal Spanish Football Federation) Madrid CFF
11	FW	Barbra Banda (captain)	20 March 2000 (aged 22)	10	22	(Chinese Football Association) Shanghai Shengli
12	MF	Evarine Katongo	29 December 2002 (aged 20)	12	0	(Football Association of Zambia) ZISD Queens
13	DF	Martha Tembo	8 March 1998 (aged 24)	21	0	(Kazakhstan Football Federation) BIIK Shymkent
14	MF	Ireen Lungu	6 October 1997 (aged 25)	12	2	(Kazakhstan Football Federation) BIIK Shymkent
15	DF	Agness Musase	11 July 1997 (aged 25)	24	0	(Football Association of Zambia) Green Buffaloes
16	GK	Hazel Nali	4 April 1998 (aged 24)	18	0	(Turkish Football Federation) Fatih Vatan
17	FW	Racheal Kundananji	3 June 2000 (aged 22)	7	6	(Royal Spanish Football Federation) Madrid CFF
18	GK	Eunice Sakala	23 May 2002 (aged 20)	0	0	(Football Association of Zambia) Nkwazi Queens
19	FW	Xiomara Mapepa	4 July 2002 (aged 20)	11	2	(Football Association of Zambia) Elite Ladies
20	FW	Racheal Nachula	3 June 2000 (aged 22)	7	6	(Royal Spanish Football Federation) Zaragoza CFF
21	MF	Hellen Chanda	19 June 1998 (aged 24)	1	0	(Kazakhstan Football Federation) BIIK Shymkent
22	DF	Esther Banda	21 November 2004 (aged 18)	1	0	(Football Association of Zambia) Bauleni United Sports Academy
23	MF	Prisca Chilufya	8 June 1999 (aged 23)	0	0	(Turkish Football Federation) Fatih Karagümrük
24	FW	Ochumba Oseke	1 July 2002 (aged 20)	20	4	(Football Association of Zambia) Red Arrows

== Group B ==
=== Bulgaria ===
Coach: Silvia Radoyska

The squad was announced on 6 February 2023.

No.	Pos.	Player	Date of birth (age)	Caps	Goals	Club
	GK	Roksana Shahanska	23 April 1992 (aged 30)	13	0	(Bulgarian Football Union) Lokomotiv
	GK	Viktoria Dimova	8 January 2002 (aged 21)	0	0	(Bulgarian Football Union) NSA
	GK	Victoria Ivanova	25 January 2001 (aged 22)	0	0	(Bulgarian Football Union) Sevlievo Ladies
	DF	Nikoleta Boycheva	20 August 1994 (aged 28)	9	0	(Bulgarian Football Union) Lokomotiv
	DF	Nora Dimitrova	26 July 1996 (aged 26)	12	0	(Bulgarian Football Union) Lokomotiv
	DF	Mariela Nedeva	12 July 2000 (aged 22)	2	0	(Bulgarian Football Union) NSA
	DF	Silviya Kefalova	6 June 2001 (aged 21)	2	0	(Bulgarian Football Union) NSA
	DF	Zhasmina Atanasova	25 June 1996 (aged 26)	5	0	(Bulgarian Football Union) LP Super Sport
	DF	Ivet Vasileva	12 July 1998 (aged 24)	0	0	(Bulgarian Football Union) LP Super Sport
	DF	Yanitsa Ivanova	5 January 2001 (aged 22)	13	0	(Italian Football Federation) ASD Real Meda
	DF	Gergana Iliycheva	24 February 2002 (aged 20)	2	0	(Italian Football Federation) Città di Matera
	MF	Ivana Naydenova	21 December 2001 (aged 21)	12	2	(Italian Football Federation) Orobica Bergamo
	MF	Lora Petrova	12 October 1998 (aged 24)	12	1	(Italian Football Federation) Orobica Bergamo
	MF	Dessi Dupuy	10 June 1993 (aged 29)	3	0	(Swedish Football Association) Växjö DFF
	MF	Leonora Zheleva	13 May 1999 (aged 23)	6	0	(Royal Spanish Football Federation) Deportivo Parquesol
	MF	Ivelina Pavlova	18 July 2003 (aged 19)	1	0	(Bulgarian Football Union) NSA
	MF	Zdravka Parapunova	6 August 2003 (aged 19)	0	0	(Bulgarian Football Union) NSA
	FW	Polina Rusina	12 March 1999 (aged 23)	9	0	(Bulgarian Football Union) NSA
	FW	Bilyana Pencheva	23 May 1997 (aged 25)	3	0	(Bulgarian Football Union) Lokomotiv
	FW	Mirela Moeva	29 September 2000 (aged 22)	0	0	(Bulgarian Football Union) Etar VT
	FW	Evdokiya Popadinova	26 October 1996 (aged 26)	6	1	(Italian Football Federation) Sassuolo
	FW	Aleksandra Yaneva	24 February 2001 (aged 21)	0	0	(Italian Football Federation) Città di Matera

=== Estonia ===
Coaches: Anastassia Morkovkina & Sirje Roops

The final squad was announced on 13 February 2023.

No.	Pos.	Player	Date of birth (age)	Caps	Goals	Club
1	GK	Keiti Kruusmann	10 June 2003 (aged 19)	0	0	(Estonian Football Association) Saku Sporting
2	DF	Maarja Saulep	9 May 1991 (aged 31)	12	1	(Estonian Football Association) Flora
3	DF	Rahel Repkin	17 June 1998 (aged 24)	1	0	(Estonian Football Association) Tammeka
4	MF	Grete Daut	4 January 2000 (aged 23)	19	0	(Estonian Football Association) Saku Sporting
5	DF	Siret Räämet	31 December 1999 (aged 23)	27	0	(Estonian Football Association) Flora
6	FW	Katriin Saulus	5 July 2003 (aged 19)	2	0	(Estonian Football Association) Saku Sporting
7	FW	Liisa Merisalu	15 January 2002 (aged 21)	22	2	(Estonian Football Association) Tammeka
8	MF	Kairi Himanen (captain)	11 November 1992 (aged 30)	60	4	(Estonian Football Association) Saku Sporting
9	DF	Kristiina Tullus	12 September 1998 (aged 24)	11	0	(Estonian Football Association) Flora
10	DF	Berle Brant	26 September 1989 (aged 33)	26	1	(Estonian Football Association) Saku Sporting
11	MF	Jaanika Volkov	20 February 2005 (aged 17)	7	0	(Estonian Football Association) Flora
12	FW	Katrin Kirpu	9 October 2004 (aged 18)	1	0	(Football Association of Finland) HJK
13	GK	Liisa Liimets	4 April 2006 (aged 16)	0	0	(Estonian Football Association) Viimsi
14	MF	Lisette Tammik	14 October 1998 (aged 24)	53	6	(Estonian Football Association) Flora
15	DF	Daniela Mona Lambin	14 February 1991 (aged 31)	34	1	(Estonian Football Association) Flora
16	DF	Kelly Rosen	23 November 1995 (aged 27)	64	1	(Estonian Football Association) Flora
17	FW	Mari-Liis Lillemäe	1 September 2000 (aged 22)	36	2	(Estonian Football Association) Flora
19	FW	Vlada Kubassova	23 August 1995 (aged 27)	58	9	(Italian Football Federation) Como
20	FW	Getter Saar	9 November 1999 (aged 23)	12	3	(Estonian Football Association) Flora
21	MF	Renate-Ly Mehevets	2 March 1999 (aged 23)	14	0	(Estonian Football Association) Tammeka
22	FW	Kristina Bannikova	15 June 1991 (aged 31)	91	8	(Estonian Football Association) Vaprus
23	FW	Emma Treiberg	19 November 2000 (aged 22)	26	0	(Estonian Football Association) Saku Sporting
24	DF	Eva-Maria Niit	5 February 2002 (aged 21)	6	0	(Estonian Football Association) Tammeka

=== Hong Kong ===
Coach: (Brazil) José Ricardo Rambo

No.	Pos.	Player	Date of birth (age)	Club
	GK	Ng Cheuk Wai	19 March 1997 (aged 25)	(Chinese Taipei Football Association) Taoyuan Mars
	GK	Ng Yuen Ki	20 December 1997 (aged 25)	(Football Association of Hong Kong, China) Happy Valley
	DF	Ma Chak Shun	2 March 1996 (aged 26)	(Football Association of Hong Kong, China) Chelsea
	DF	Wong Hei Tung	8 January 2001 (aged 22)	(Football Association of Hong Kong, China) Chelsea
	DF	Wu Choi Yiu	10 September 2004 (aged 18)	(Football Association of Hong Kong, China) Chelsea
	DF	Hui Yee Sum	6 April 2002 (aged 20)	(Football Association of Hong Kong, China) Citizen
	DF	Kwok Oi Laam		(Football Association of Hong Kong, China) Citizen
	DF	Chung Pui-ki	2 February 1998 (aged 25)	(Football Association of Hong Kong, China) Kitchee
	DF	So Hoi Lam		(Football Association of Hong Kong, China) Kitchee
	DF	Wong So Han	26 November 1991 (aged 31)	(Football Association of Hong Kong, China) Shatin
	MF	Chan Wing Lam	30 July 2003 (aged 19)	(Football Association of Hong Kong, China) Chelsea
	MF	Chan Yee Hing		(Football Association of Hong Kong, China) Chelsea
	MF	Leung Hong Kiu		(Football Association of Hong Kong, China) Chelsea
	MF	Tsang Lai Mae		(Football Association of Hong Kong, China) Chelsea
	MF	Chu Po Yan	1 August 2005 (aged 17)	(Football Association of Hong Kong, China) Citizen
	MF	Chan Wing Sze (captain)	11 September 1983 (aged 39)	(Football Association of Hong Kong, China) Shatin
	MF	Tsang Pak Tung	28 October 2003 (aged 19)	(Football Association of Hong Kong, China) Tai Po
	MF	Cham Ching Man		(Football Association of Hong Kong, China) Kitchee
	MF	Lee Wing Yan	28 April 1997 (aged 25)	(Football Association of Hong Kong, China) Kitchee
	FW	Lau Yun Yi		(Football Association of Hong Kong, China) Tai Po
	FW	Kwan Wing Yu		(Football Association of Hong Kong, China) Citizen
	MF	Cheung Wai Ki		(Football Association of Hong Kong, China) Kitchee

=== Jordan ===
Coach: (Cape Verde) David Nascimento

A preliminary squad was announced on 4 February 2023. The following week, the team announced their withdrawal, due to the earthquakes in the area.

=== Kosovo ===
Coach: (Sweden) Karin Anneli Andersen

The final squad was announced on 13 February 2023.

No.	Pos.	Player	Date of birth (age)	Caps	Goals	Club
1	GK	Besarta Leci	14 October 1993 (aged 29)	14	0	(German Football Association) VfB Stuttgart
2	FW	Rrezona Ramadani	5 September 2002 (aged 20)	1	0	(Albanian Football Federation) Vllaznia Shkodër
3	DF	Viola Avduli	22 November 1999 (aged 23)	10	0	(Swiss Football Association) Zürich
4	MF	Donjeta Halilaj (vice-captain)	12 March 2000 (aged 22)	23	2	(Football Federation of Kosovo) Mitrovica
5	DF	Blerta Smaili	8 May 2002 (aged 20)	11	0	(Swedish Football Association) Sundsvall
6	DF	Besarta Hisenaj	21 October 1998 (aged 24)	16	0	(German Football Association) SG Andernach
7	FW	Erëleta Memeti (captain)	30 June 1999 (aged 23)	20	4	(German Football Association) 1899 Hoffenheim
8	MF	Blerta Shala	3 December 1998 (aged 24)	35	1	(Football Federation of Kosovo) Mitrovica
9	MF	Kaltrina Biqkaj	5 August 2000 (aged 22)	37	4	(Football Federation of Kosovo) Mitrovica
10	FW	Valentina Metaj	3 October 2004 (aged 18)	3	1	(Swedish Football Association) Ifö Bromölla
11	DF	Edona Kryeziu	3 October 1995 (aged 27)	36	0	(Football Federation of Kosovo) Mitrovica
12	GK	Alma Demiri	27 June 2005 (aged 17)	0	0	(German Football Association) 1. FC Köln II
13	MF	Albulena Guri	16 December 2004 (aged 18)	1	0	(Football Federation of Kosovo) EP-COM Hajvalia
14	MF	Erona Bajrami	10 September 2003 (aged 19)	0	0	(Football Federation of Kosovo) EP-COM Hajvalia
15	MF	Lumbardha Misini	3 May 2003 (aged 19)	11	0	(Football Federation of Kosovo) EP-COM Hajvalia
16	GK	Lavdije Behramaj	1 May 1999 (aged 23)	1	0	(Football Federation of Kosovo) Mitrovica
17	MF	Iliriana Vllasalija	16 June 1999 (aged 23)	1	0	(Swedish Football Association) Ifö Bromölla
18	MF	Loreta Lulaj	24 June 2003 (aged 19)	7	0	(German Football Association) RB Leipzig II
19	FW	Egzona Zeka	25 April 1997 (aged 25)	2	0	(Football Federation of Kosovo) Mitrovica
20	FW	Jehona Shala	28 May 2001 (aged 21)	0	0	(Albanian Football Federation) Vllaznia Shkodër
21	DF	Agnesa Gashi	21 May 1998 (aged 24)	10	0	(Football Federation of Kosovo) Mitrovica
22	FW	Feride Kastrati	23 May 1993 (aged 29)	13	0	(Football Federation of Kosovo) EP-COM Hajvalia
23	FW	Elizabeta Ejupi	21 April 1994 (aged 28)	3	0	(The Football Association) Sunderland
24	MF	Fatlinda Ramaj	1 October 2000 (aged 22)	8	0	(Football Federation of Kosovo) EP-COM Hajvalia

=== North Macedonia ===
Coach: Kiril Izov

The squad was announced on 15 February 2023.

No.	Pos.	Player	Date of birth (age)	Club
1	GK	Viktorija Panchurova	25 December 1999 (aged 23)	(Football Federation of Macedonia) Tiverija Istatov
2	DF	Aleksandra Jovanovska	12 October 2003 (aged 19)	(Football Federation of Macedonia) Tiverija Istatov
3	FW	Bojana Petkova	23 December 2003 (aged 19)	(Football Federation of Macedonia) Ljuboten
4	MF	Mila Talevska	8 February 1999 (aged 24)	(Football Federation of Macedonia) Kamenica Sasa
5	DF	Pavlina Nikolovska	4 March 1998 (aged 24)	(Football Federation of Macedonia) Dragon
6	MF	Elma Shemsovikj	4 February 1999 (aged 24)	(Football Federation of Macedonia) Kamenica Sasa
7	FW	Gentjana Rochi	17 September 1994 (aged 28)	(Football Association of Finland) KuPS
8	MF	Aleksandra Markovska	4 May 1997 (aged 25)	(Football Federation of Macedonia) Ljuboten
9	FW	Ulza Maksuti	8 July 1999 (aged 23)	(Football Federation of Macedonia) Tiverija Istatov
10	MF	Nataša Andonova (captain)	4 December 1993 (aged 29)	(Royal Spanish Football Federation) Levante
11	MF	Hava Mustafa	20 September 1997 (aged 25)	(Football Federation of Macedonia) Shkëndija
12	GK	Lina Samardzievska	15 May 2002 (aged 20)	(Swedish Football Association) Växjö DFF
13	FW	Julija Zivikj	29 October 2000 (aged 22)	(Football Federation of Macedonia) Dragon
14	MF	Tea Bozhinoska	25 September 2003 (aged 19)	(Croatian Football Federation) Rijeka
15	DF	Elena Paneska	10 July 2002 (aged 20)	(Football Federation of Macedonia) Kamenica Sasa
16	DF	Viktorija Nedeva	20 June 2003 (aged 19)	(Football Federation of Macedonia) Tiverija Istatov
17	MF	Lenche Andreevska	13 August 1992 (aged 30)	(Football Federation of Macedonia) Kamenica Sasa
18	DF	Hristina Joshevska	27 December 2000 (aged 22)	(Football Federation of Macedonia) Kamenica Sasa
19	FW	Kristina Petrushevska	23 September 2000 (aged 22)	(Football Federation of Macedonia) Tiverija Istatov
20	FW	Radica Choneva	8 November 2001 (aged 21)	(Football Federation of Macedonia) Tiverija Istatov
21	DF	Elena Petrovska	13 March 1998 (aged 24)	(Football Federation of Macedonia) Ljuboten
22	GK	Thea Draganova	16 April 2005 (aged 17)	(Football Australia) APIA Leichhardt
23	DF	Ana Milchevska	23 August 2003 (aged 19)	(Football Federation of Macedonia) Tiverija Istatov
24	DF	Daniela Veleska	10 March 1997 (aged 25)	(Football Federation of Macedonia) Despina

== Player representation ==
=== By club ===
Clubs with 3 or more players represented are listed.

Players	Club(s)
9	(Estonia) Flora
7	(Hong Kong) Chelsea, (Kosovo) Mitrovica, (North Macedonia) Tiverija Istatov, (South Africa) Mamelodi Sundowns
6	(Bulgaria) NSA, (Estonia) Saku Sporting, (South Africa) UWC, (Uzbekistan) Sogdiana Jizzakh
5	(Hong Kong) Kitchee, (Kosovo) EP-COM Hajvalia, (North Macedonia) Kamenica Sasa, (Uzbekistan) Bunyodkor
4	(Bulgaria) Lokomotiv, (Estonia) Tammeka, (Hong Kong) Citizen, (Slovenia) Mura, (Slovenia) Olimpija Ljubljana, (Uzbekistan) Sevinch
3	(Kazakhstan) BIIK Shymkent, (North Macedonia) Ljuboten, (South Africa) JVW, (Zambia) Green Buffaloes

=== By club nationality ===
Players	Club(s)
21	Estonia, Hong Kong
20	Uzbekistan
19	North Macedonia, South Africa
14	Bulgaria
12	Italy, Kosovo, Zambia
11	Slovenia
8	Germany, Spain
4	Kazakhstan, Sweden, Turkey
2	Albania, Croatia, England, Finland, Mexico
1	Australia, Austria, China, Chinese Taipei, Netherlands, Portugal, Scotland, South Korea, Switzerland

=== By club federation ===
Players	Federation
130	UEFA
45	AFC
31	CAF
2	CONCACAF

=== By representatives of domestic league ===
Players	National squad
21	Estonia
21	Hong Kong
20	Uzbekistan
19	North Macedonia
19	South Africa
14	Bulgaria
12	Kosovo
12	Zambia
11	Slovenia
