= 2024 Pinatar Cup squads =

List of players competing at the 4th edition of the Pinatar Cup

This article lists the squads for the 2024 Pinatar Cup, the 4th edition of the Pinatar Cup. The tournament consisted of a series of friendly matches to held in Spain from 24 to 27 February 2024.

The age listed for each player is on 24 February 2024, the first day of the tournament. The numbers of caps and goals listed for each player do not include any matches played after the start of tournament. The club listed is the club for which the player last played a competitive match prior to the tournament. The nationality for each club reflects the national association (not the league) to which the club is affiliated. A flag is included for coaches that are of a different nationality than their own national team.

== Squads ==
=== Finland ===
Coach: Marko Saloranta

The final 25-player squad was announced on 13 February 2024. On 21 February, in the warm-up to a pre-tournament friendly against Philippines, Emmi Siren was injured and a couple of days later withdrew from the squad.

No.	Pos.	Player	Date of birth (age)	Caps	Goals	Club
1	GK	Anna Koivunen	28 November 1999 (aged 24)			(Sweden) Brommapojkarna
2	DF	Elli Pikkujämsä	24 October 1999 (aged 24)			(United States) Racing Louisville
3	DF	Eva Nyström	29 November 1999 (aged 24)			(Sweden) Hammarby
4	MF	Ria Öling	15 September 1994 (aged 29)			(Sweden) Rosengård
5	DF	Emma Koivisto	25 September 1994 (aged 29)			(England) Liverpool
6	DF	Tiia Peltonen	8 June 1995 (aged 28)			(Denmark) Fortuna Hjørring
7	DF	Joanna Tynnilä	1 September 2001 (aged 22)			(Norway) Brann
8	MF	Olga Ahtinen	15 August 1997 (aged 26)			(England) Tottenham Hotspur
9	MF	Katariina Kosola	24 February 2001 (aged 23)			(Sweden) Häcken
11	DF	Nora Heroum	20 July 1994 (aged 29)			(Italy) Sampdoria
12	GK	Milla-Maj Majasaari	15 October 1999 (aged 24)			(Belgium) Anderlecht
13	MF	Oona Siren	23 February 2001 (aged 23)			(Norway) Lillestrøm
14	FW	Heidi Kollanen	6 June 1997 (aged 26)			(Sweden) Vittsjö
15	DF	Natalia Kuikka	1 December 1995 (aged 28)			(United States) Chicago Red Stars
16	MF	Anni Hartikainen	19 August 2003 (aged 20)			(Sweden) Rosengård
17	FW	Sanni Franssi	19 March 1995 (aged 28)			(Spain) Real Sociedad
18	FW	Linda Sällström	13 July 1988 (aged 35)			(Sweden) Vittsjö
19	MF	Emma Peuhkurinen	30 November 1999 (aged 24)			(Norway) Lillestrøm
20	MF	Eveliina Summanen	29 May 1998 (aged 25)			(England) Tottenham Hotspur
21	FW	Oona Sevenius	28 April 2004 (aged 19)			(Italy) Como
22	FW	Jutta Rantala	10 November 1999 (aged 24)			(England) Leicester City
23	GK	Tinja-Riikka Korpela	5 May 1986 (aged 37)			(Italy) Roma
24	MF	Vilma Koivisto	21 November 2002 (aged 21)			(Sweden) Linköpings
25	FW	Lotta Lindström	10 September 2004 (aged 19)			(England) London City Lionesses

=== Philippines ===
Coach: (Australia) Mark Torcaso

The final 27-player squad was announced on 15 February 2024.

No.	Pos.	Player	Date of birth (age)	Caps	Goals	Club
1	GK	Olivia McDaniel	14 October 1997 (aged 26)			(Austria) Pinzgau Saalfelden
2	DF	Reina Bonta	17 April 1999 (aged 24)			(Brazil) Santos
3	DF	Jessika Cowart	30 October 1999 (aged 24)			(Australia) Perth Glory
4	MF	Jaclyn Sawicki	14 November 1992 (aged 31)			(Australia) Western United
5	DF	Hali Long	21 January 1995 (aged 29)			(Philippines) Kaya–Iloilo
6	MF	Tahnai Annis (captain)	20 June 1989 (aged 34)			(Iceland) Þór/KA
7	FW	Sarina Bolden	30 June 1996 (aged 27)			(Australia) Newcastle Jets
8	MF	Sara Eggesvik	29 April 1997 (aged 26)			(Norway) KIL/Hemne
9	FW	Isabella Flanigan	22 February 2005 (aged 19)			(United States) West Virginia Mountaineers
10	FW	Chandler McDaniel	4 February 1998 (aged 26)			(Costa Rica) Dimas Escazú
11	MF	Jessica Miclat	8 October 1998 (aged 25)			(Sweden) Eskilstuna United
12	FW	Isabella Bandoja	22 February 2005 (aged 19)			(Philippines) Tuloy
13	DF	Angela Beard	16 August 1997 (aged 26)			(Sweden) Linköpings
14	MF	Meryll Serrano	20 July 1997 (aged 26)			(Norway) Stabæk
15	MF	Isabella Pasion	28 November 2006 (aged 17)			(United States) Lebanon Trail Blazers
16	DF	Sofia Harrison	16 February 1999 (aged 25)			Unattached
17	MF	Camille Sahirul				(United States) FIU Panthers
18	GK	Leah Bradley				(United States) Wilmington Hammerheads
19	DF	Katana Norman	28 September 2004 (aged 19)			(United States) Portland Pilots
20	MF	Quinley Quezada	7 April 1997 (aged 26)			(Australia) Perth Glory
21	MF	Katrina Guillou	19 December 1993 (aged 30)			Unattached
22	GK	Nina Meollo	23 June 2004 (aged 19)			(England) Cambridge City
23	FW	Alexa Pino				(United States) St. Joseph High School
24	DF	Maya Alcantara	22 July 2000 (aged 23)			Unattached
25	FW	Dionesa Tolentin	25 June 2000 (aged 23)			(Philippines) FEU Lady Booters
26	DF	Rhea Chan				(United States) Cal Poly Humboldt Lumberjacks
27	DF	Aiselyn Sia	23 February 2009 (aged 15)			(United States) Martin Luther King High School

=== Scotland ===
Coach: (Spain) Pedro Martínez Losa

The final 23-player squad was announced on 13 February 2024. The following week Christy Grimshaw withdrew due to injury and was replaced by Jenny Smith.

No.	Pos.	Player	Date of birth (age)	Caps	Goals	Club
1	GK	Lee Gibson	23 September 1991 (aged 32)	52	0	(Scotland) Glasgow City
2	DF	Nicola Docherty	23 August 1992 (aged 31)	51	2	(Scotland) Rangers
3	DF	Leah Eddie	23 January 2001 (aged 23)	2	0	(Scotland) Hibernian
4	DF	Rachel Corsie (captain)	17 August 1989 (aged 34)	146	20	(England) Aston Villa
5	DF	Sophie Howard	17 September 1993 (aged 30)	44	3	(England) Leicester City
6	MF	Chelsea Cornet	19 April 1998 (aged 25)	1	0	(Scotland) Rangers
7	FW	Fiona Brown	31 March 1995 (aged 28)	57	2	(Scotland) Glasgow City
8	MF	Sam Kerr	17 April 1999 (aged 24)	20	1	(Germany) Bayern Munich
9	FW	Martha Thomas	31 May 1996 (aged 27)	32	11	(England) Tottenham Hotspur
10	FW	Kirsty Hanson	17 April 1998 (aged 25)	26	2	(England) Aston Villa
11	MF	Lisa Evans	21 May 1992 (aged 31)	103	17	(England) Bristol City
12	GK	Jenna Fife	1 December 1995 (aged 28)	10	0	(Scotland) Rangers
13	FW	Jane Ross	18 September 1989 (aged 34)	146	62	(Scotland) Rangers
14	MF	Hayley Lauder	4 June 1990 (aged 33)	104	9	(Scotland) Glasgow City
15	DF	Jenna Clark	29 September 2001 (aged 22)	10	1	(England) Liverpool
16	MF	Amy Rodgers	4 May 2000 (aged 23)	3	0	(England) Bristol City
17	MF	Jenny Smith	20 June 2002 (aged 21)	1	0	(Scotland) Celtic
18	FW	Claire Emslie	8 March 1994 (aged 29)	58	12	(United States) Angel City
19	FW	Lauren Davidson	1 October 2001 (aged 22)	15	1	(Scotland) Glasgow City
20	FW	Brogan Hay	1 March 1999 (aged 24)	5	0	(Scotland) Rangers
21	GK	Sandy MacIver	18 June 1998 (aged 25)	2	0	(England) Manchester City
22	MF	Erin Cuthbert	19 July 1998 (aged 25)	63	22	(England) Chelsea
23	MF	Jamie-Lee Napier	6 April 2000 (aged 23)	7	0	(England) Bristol City

=== Slovenia ===
Coach: Saša Kolman

The final 21-player squad was announced on 9 February 2024. Later, Mateja Zver was added to the squad.

No.	Pos.	Player	Date of birth (age)	Caps	Goals	Club
1	GK	Zala Meršnik	7 June 2001 (aged 22)			(Spain) Sporting de Huelva
2	DF	Lana Golob	26 October 1999 (aged 24)			(Belgium) OH Leuven
3	DF	Sara Agrež	9 December 2000 (aged 23)			(Germany) 1. FC Köln
4	DF	Sara Gradišek	16 July 2003 (aged 20)			(Italy) Bologna
5	DF	Naja Poje Mihelič	17 August 2006 (aged 17)			(Italy) Sassuolo
6	MF	Kaja Korošec	17 November 2001 (aged 22)			(France) Paris FC
7	FW	Nina Kajzba	4 April 2004 (aged 19)			(Italy) Napoli
8	MF	Mateja Zver	15 March 1988 (aged 35)			(Austria) St. Pölten
9	DF	Anja Eferl	1 March 2004 (aged 19)			(Spain) Real Oviedo
10	MF	Dominika Čonč	1 January 1993 (aged 31)			(Spain) Levante Las Planas
11	FW	Lara Prašnikar	8 August 1998 (aged 25)			(Germany) Eintracht Frankfurt
12	GK	Iva Kocijan	10 May 2004 (aged 19)			(Slovenia) Mura
13	MF	Zala Kuštrin	18 June 1998 (aged 25)			(Italy) Bologna
14	FW	Špela Kolbl	13 March 1998 (aged 25)			(Slovenia) Mura
15	MF	Sara Makovec	31 March 2000 (aged 23)			(Slovenia) Olimpija Ljubljana
16	DF	Kaja Eržen	21 August 1994 (aged 29)			(Italy) Fiorentina
17	MF	Izabela Križaj	11 May 2000 (aged 23)			(Slovenia) Olimpija Ljubljana
18	MF	Manja Rogan	22 October 1995 (aged 28)			(Greece) Panathinaikos
20	MF	Zara Kramžar	10 January 2006 (aged 18)			(Italy) Roma
21	MF	Korina Janež	25 February 2004 (aged 19)			(Germany) RB Leipzig
22	GK	Melania Pasar	18 October 1999 (aged 24)			(Hungary) Budapest Honvéd
23	MF	Luana Zajmi	29 January 2002 (aged 22)			(Turkey) ALG Spor

== Player representation ==
=== By club ===
Clubs with 3 or more players represented are listed.

Players	Club
5	(Scotland) Rangers
4	(Scotland) Glasgow City
3	(England) Bristol City, (England) Tottenham Hotspur

=== By club nationality ===
Players	Clubs
16	England
11	Scotland, United States
10	Sweden
9	Italy
5	Norway
4	Australia, Germany, Slovenia, Spain
3	Philippines
2	Austria, Belgium
1	Brazil, Costa Rica, Denmark, France, Greece, Hungary, Iceland, Turkey

=== By club federation ===
Players	Federation
73	UEFA
12	CONCACAF
7	AFC
1	CONMEBOL

=== By representatives of domestic league ===
National squad	Players
Scotland	11
Slovenia	4
Philippines	3
Finland	0
