= 2019–20 Slovenian Women's League =

Slovenian Women's League
- Season: 2019–20
- Dates: 18 August 2019 – 7 March 2020
- Champions League: Pomurje
- Matches played: 49
- Goals scored: 291 (5.94 per match)
- Top goalscorer: Ana Milovič (29 goals)
- Biggest home win: Olimpija 16–0 Ajdovščina
- Biggest away win: Ajdovščina 0–13 Olimpija
- Highest scoring: Olimpija 16–0 Ajdovščina
- Longest winning run: 13 matches Pomurje
- Longest unbeaten run: 13 matches Pomurje
- Longest winless run: 13 matches Ajdovščina
- Longest losing run: 9 matches Ajdovščina
- Highest attendance: 600; Pomurje 4–0 Olimpija
- Lowest attendance: 20; Ajdovščina 0–6 Krim
- Total attendance: 3,765
- Average attendance: 76

The 2019–20 season of the Slovenian Women's League (Slovenian: Prva slovenska ženska nogometna liga) or simply 1. SŽNL was the 28th season of Slovenia's premier women's football league. It ran from 18 August 2019 to 7 March 2020, when play was suspended. In May 2020 the season was cancelled due to the COVID-19 pandemic in Slovenia. The executive board of the Football Association of Slovenia decided that defending champions and unbeaten league-leaders ŽNK Pomurje would take the 2021–22 UEFA Women's Champions League place.

== Teams ==
| Team | Home city | Home ground |
|---|---|---|
| Ajdovščina | Ajdovščina | Police Sports Centre |
| Cerklje | Cerklje | Velesovo Sports Centre |
| Koper Obala | Koper | Bonifika Stadium |
| Krim | Ljubljana | Igrišče Krim |
| MB Tabor | Maribor | Tabor Sports Park |
| Olimpija Ljubljana | Ljubljana | Jama Lj.-Bežigrad Sports Park |
| Pomurje | Beltinci | Bratonci Sports Centre |
| Radomlje | Radomlje | Radomlje Sports Park |

Locations of teams in the 2019–20 season

== League table ==
| Pos | Team | Pld | W | D | L | GF | GA | GD | Pts | Qualification or relegation |
|---|---|---|---|---|---|---|---|---|---|---|
| 1 | Pomurje | 13 | 13 | 0 | 0 | 80 | 5 | +75 | 39 | Qualification for the UEFA Women's Champions League |
| 2 | Olimpija | 12 | 11 | 0 | 1 | 86 | 8 | +78 | 33 | |
| 3 | Radomlje | 12 | 6 | 1 | 5 | 28 | 32 | −4 | 19 | |
| 4 | Krim | 12 | 5 | 1 | 6 | 27 | 32 | −5 | 16 | |
| 5 | Koper Obala | 12 | 4 | 1 | 7 | 18 | 34 | −16 | 13 | |
| 6 | MB Tabor | 12 | 3 | 2 | 7 | 21 | 30 | −9 | 11 | |
| 7 | Cerklje | 12 | 3 | 2 | 7 | 28 | 52 | −24 | 11 | |
| 8 | Ajdovščina | 13 | 0 | 1 | 12 | 3 | 98 | −95 | 1 | |

Updated to match(es) played on 7 March 2020. Source: Soccerway

== Season statistics ==
=== Top scorers ===
As of 7 March 2020

| Rank | Player | Club | Goals |
|---|---|---|---|
| 1 | (Slovenia) Ana Milovič | Olimpija | 29 |
| 2 | (Slovenia) Manca Suhoveršnik | Olimpija | 19 |
| 3 | (Slovenia) Špela Kolbl | Pomurje | 18 |
| 4 | (Slovenia) Zala Kuštrin | Radomlje | 13 |
| 4 | (Slovenia) Luana Zajmi | Pomurje | 13 |
| 5 | (Slovenia) Manja Rogan | Olimpija | 12 |
