= Manja Rogan =

Slovenian footballer

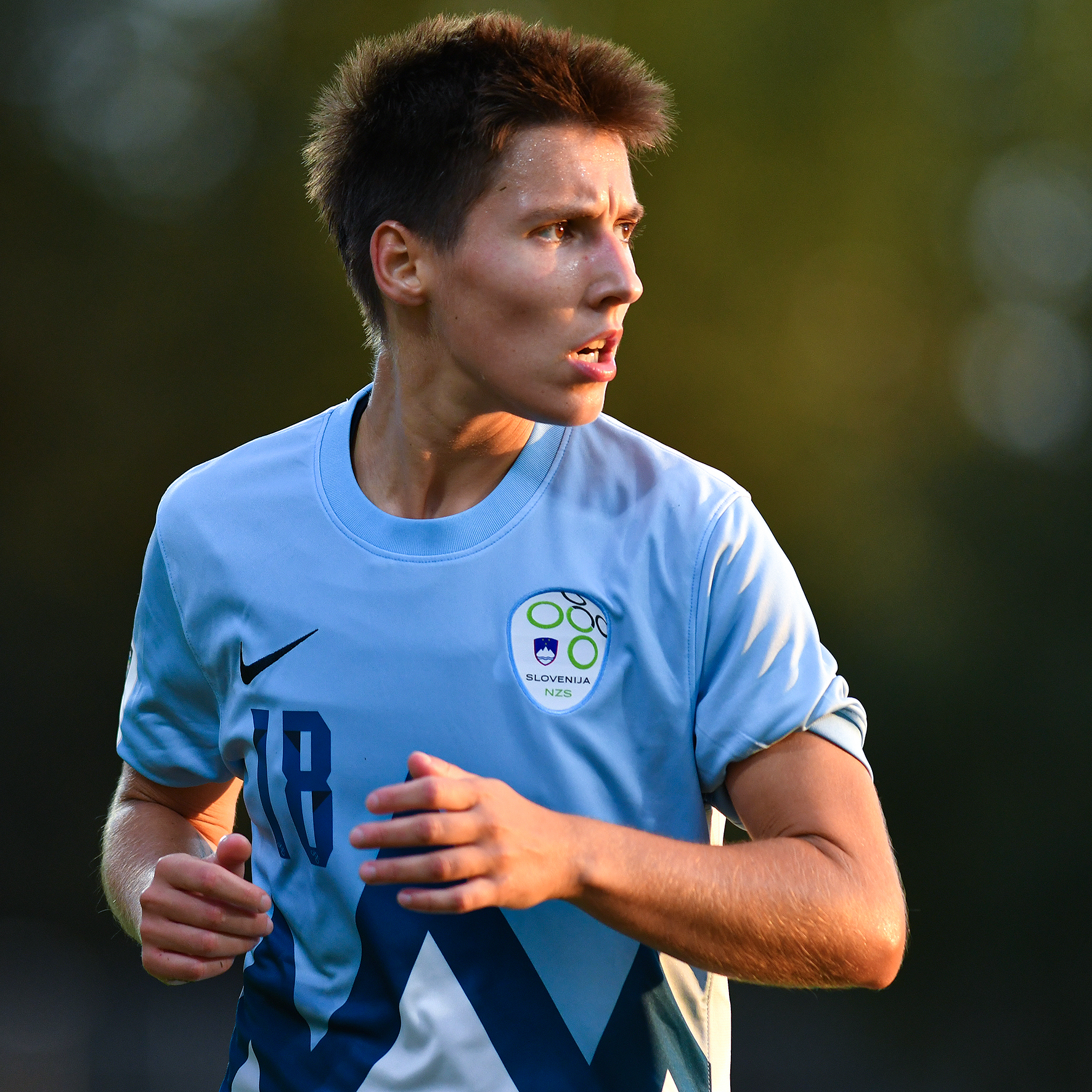
- Rogan with Slovenia in 2022

Personal information
- Full name: Manja Rogan
- Position: Midfielder

Team information
- Current team: FC New club
- Number: new

Senior career*
Years	Team	Apps	(Gls)
2009–2017	Mura	126	(84)
2017–2018	Split	9	(6)
2018–2023	Olimpija	96	(94)
2023–2024	Panathinaikos	26	(7)
2025–2026	Nantes	14	(0)
2026–	New		

International career^{‡}
2007–2011	Slovenia WU17	9	(1)
2011–2014	Slovenia WU19	9	(0)
2013–	Slovenia	45	(2)
- * Club domestic league appearances and goals as of 6 June 2026 ‡ National team caps and goals as of 6 June 2026

Manja Rogan is a Slovenian professional footballer who plays as a midfielder for Première Ligue club FC Nantes and the Slovenia women's national team. Rogan started her senior career with NK Mura in 2009.

In 2016, she won the award for the best female footballer in Slovenia for the first time in history. She was chosen in the Best 11 in 2015–16, 2018–19, and 2020–21.

In 2024, she won the award for the best midfielder in Women's super league Greece.

Rogan is known for her passing, shooting, game reading, and predicting game. She is a left-footed footballer, and specialist for set-pieces, who usually takes penalties, free kicks, and corners.

== Club career ==
=== NK Mura, 2009–2017 ===
When she was four, Rogan began her football career with boys’ team NK Mura. The rules of Intermunicipal Football Association Murska Sobota prevented Rogan from playing with boys over the age of 12. She decided, at the age of 8, that she wants to play with the girls’ team. In 1999 WFC Odranci was founded, and she became a part of the club in 2003. Rogan played all youth games from under-8 until under-17. She was the captain of the youth team. Every year, she received an award for the best young player in tournaments. In 2007, Rogan began training with the senior team and playing friendly games when she was 12-years-old. She was the youngest player in the team. On 26 October 2009, she made her official senior debut for NK Mura in the Slovenian Women's League. The next four seasons, Rogan played for the under-17 and senior team. She was made one of the senior team captains since 2011. In the season 2011–12, and 2012–13 Rogan won league title with youth team under-17.

In the 2011–12 season, Rogan won her first Double in the career. She was part of the team that won the 2012 Slovenian Cup with NK Mura defeating WFC Rudar Škale in the final. On 3 June 2012, one round before finishing, Rogan won championship title with the club in Slovenian Women's League. During the game against WFC Rudar Škale, she scored the second goal, and helped her team lift the trophy. She finished the season with 32 appearances in all competitions, where she scored 13 goals, including 4 under-17, and 1 in Slovenian Cup. NK Mura became the dominant force in Slovenian women's football team between 2012 and 2016.

In the 2012–13 season, Rogan started the season with a debut in qualifying tournament of the 2012–13 UEFA Women's Champions League. On 13 August 2012, she scored her first ever two Champions League goals, one on a penalty, in a 9–1 win against Gintra Universitetas. She finished the tournament defeating Ataşehir Belediyesi 2–4 on aggregate and scored one goal. Rogan finished the season with her second consecutive Double with NK Mura. The team won 2013 Slovenian Cup when defeating WFC Rudar Škale in the final. On 19 May 2013, two rounds before finishing, Rogan won championship title in Slovenian Women's League. She scored the third goal in a 5–0 win against WFC Radomlje. Rogan made 36 appearances in all competitions, where she scored 32 goals, including 3 in Champions League, 13 under-17, and 1 in Slovenian Cup.

In the 2013–14 season, Rogan participated in the qualifying tournament of the 2013–14 UEFA Women's Champions League in August 2013. She finished the tournament second in the group. Rogan won her third Double in a row. On 21 May 2014, she played the 2014 Slovenian Cup final against WFC Rudar Škale, and the team won 4–1 on aggregate. On 8 June 2014, the last round before finishing the league, Rogan won her third championship title with the club in Slovenian Women's League. She finished the season with 24 appearances in all competitions, scoring 16 goals.

In the 2014–15 season, Rogan continued her rising career. The season started with 2014–15 UEFA Women's Champions League qualifying round. On 11 August 2014, Rogan scored her Champions League goal in a 0–4 win against Pärnu JK. NK Mura finished as best runners-up in the group and advanced to the Round of 32 of 2014–15 UEFA Women's Champions League. On 8 October 2014, Rogan played the first leg against Italian Torres at Lendava Sports Park, Lendava. The first half ended 0–2 on aggregate. Rogan levelled the scores direct from a corner in the second half. The game ended up a 2–4. On 15 October 2014, she played the second leg on Stadio Vanni Sanna, Sassari. In the away leg, NK Mura lost 1–3, and exited their tournament in the Round of 32. After the winter break, Rogan was made the first captain of the team. On 10 May 2015, four rounds before finishing, she won her fourth championship title in a row. On 31 May 2015, Rogan lifted the Slovenian Women's League trophy. She made 24 appearances in all competitions, where she scored 15 goals, including 2 in Champions League, and 1 in Slovenian Cup.

In the 2015–16 season, Rogan started the season with 2015–16 UEFA Women's Champions League qualifying round. She finished qualifying second in the group. On 17 April 2016, Rogan played her 100th game in Slovenian Women's League against WFC Rudar Škale, and scored one goal on a penalty. The team won 2–1 on aggregate. On 2 May 2016, four rounds before finishing, Rogan won her fifth championship title in a row. On 16 May 2016, Rogan was named the best female player of the 2015–16 league. On 25 May 2016, she played the 2016 Slovenian Cup final against WFC Radomlje. NK Mura won the final 3–7, and Rogan lifted her fourth Slovenian Cup trophy with the club. Four days later, she lifted the Slovenian Women's League trophy. NK Mura became the first team in history to win all games in championship. Rogan won her fourth Double. She finished the season with 26 appearances in all competitions, where she scored 18 goals, including 1 in Slovenian Cup.

In the 2016–17 season, Rogan participated in the tournament of the 2016–17 UEFA Women's Champions League qualifying round. On 23 August 2016, she scored two Champions League goals against Vllaznia. The game ended up a 6–1. NK Mura finished the tournament second in the group. On 25 April 2017, Rogan scored her euro goal in Slovenian Women's League in a 1–2 derby win against WFC Olimpija Ljubljana. The last round in championship, 28 May 2017, Rogan scored the first goal in the game. NK Mura fell in a 2–3 shock defeat few minutes before end to WFC Olimpija Ljubljana, and claimed runner-up. Three days later, Rogan finished the season, lifting her fifth Slovenian Cup trophy. NK Mura defeating WFC Rudar Škale 6–0 in the final. She made 26 appearances in all competitions, where she scored 14 goals, including 2 in Champions League.

=== WFC Split, 2017–2018 ===
In September 2017, Rogan moved abroad for the first time and joined Croatian WFC Split. On 23 September 2017, she started her Croatian Women's First Football League debut against WFC Hajduk Split, and she scored her first goal. In the away, WFC Split, won 0–9. Rogan spent half a season there. She made 9 appearances, scoring 6 goals.

=== WFC Olimpija Ljubljana, 2018–2023 ===
In 2018, Rogan returned to the domestic Slovenian Women’s League. On 11 March 2018, she made her WFC Olimpija Ljubljana debut. Rogan finished her league season, scoring the game-winning goal on 27 May 2018 against WFC Radomlje for a 0–1 aggregate victory. Her shot from outside the box earned her sixth major trophy and the second championship title for WFC Olimpija Ljubljana. Rogan made 12 appearances in all competitions, where she scored 7 goals, including 1 in Slovenian Cup.

In the 2018–19 season, Rogan participated in the qualifying tournament of the 2018–19 UEFA Women's Champions League in August 2018. On 4 November 2018, she scored her 100th goal in the Slovenian Women’s League, and finished the game with her third season hat-trick in a 13–0 win against Ajdovščina. After the winter break, Rogan was named as Olimpija's captain. At the end of the 2018–19 season, Rogan finished as Slovenian Women’s League top scorer in the third place. On 19 May 2019, she was named in the Best 11 as a central midfielder of the 2018–19 season league. WFC Olimpija Ljubljana finished the championship, claiming runner-up. Rogan made 25 appearances in all competitions, where she scored 30 goals, including 7 hat-tricks, and 1goal in Slovenian Cup.

In the 2019–20 season, after winter break, WFC Olimpija Ljubljana named new head coach Milomir Kondić. Following the beginning of the COVID-19 pandemic in Europe, the 2019–20 season was suspended. In the first half of the season, Rogan made 13 appearances, scoring 13 goals, including 1 in Slovenian Cup.

In the 2020–21 season, Rogan won 2021 the Slovenian Cup, first ever for WFC Olimpija Ljubljana. On 25 May 2021, she played the final against NK Mura, and the game ended up a 1–1 draw. The team won 5–3 after penalties, in which Rogan scored the game-winning fifth penalty, earning her sixth cup in the career. She lifted the historic Slovenian Cup trophy for WFC Olimpija Ljubljana. Three days before, Rogan played the last round of the championship. WFC Olimpija Ljubljana won the away derby against NK Mura 0–2 on aggregate, and claimed runner-up. Rogan made 19 appearances in all competitions, where she scored 13 goals, including 1 in Slovenian Cup.

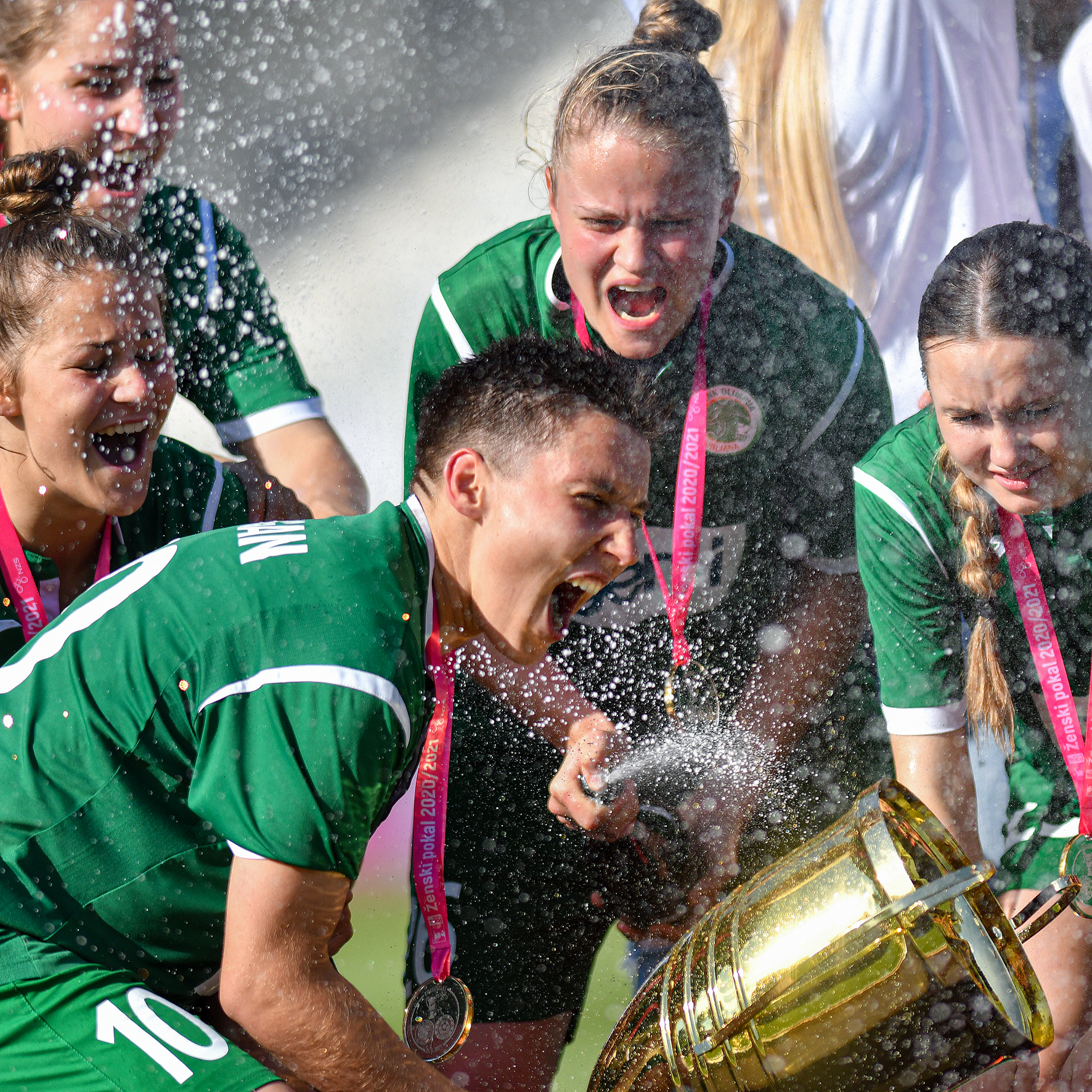
Rogan lifted the historic Slovenian Cup trophy for WFC Olimpija Ljubljana, 25 May 2021

In the 2021–22 season, Rogan continued a breakthrough season. On 24 April 2022, she played her 200th game in Slovenian Women's League in a 9–0 win against WFC Cerklje. On 11 May 2022, she played the 2022 Slovenian Cup final against WFC Ljubljana. WFC Olimpija Ljubljana won the final 0–1, and Rogan lifted her seventh Slovenian Cup trophy and second for the club. The last round in championship, 21 May 2022, she played decisive game for the champion against NK Mura, which ended up a 0–0 draw. WFC Olimpija Ljubljana claimed runner-up, what was a bitter disappointment. Rogan finished the season with 23 appearances in all competitions, where she scored 20 goals, including 2 in Slovenian Cup.

In the 2022–23 season, Rogan made 21 appearances, scoring 17 goals, including 1 in Slovenian Cup. On 6 May 2023, she played the 2023 Slovenian Cup final against WFC Mura. In the second half, the game was stopped due to heavy rain, and after returning to the pitch, Rogan scored a special free-kick goal. The game ended up a 1–3, and WFC Olimpija Ljubljana claimed runner-up. On 21 May 2023, the championship finished, and WFC Olimpija Ljubljana claimed runner-up.

In July 2023, Rogan finished her career in Slovenian Women’s League with 222 appearances, where she scored 178 goals. She played 33 games in Slovenian Cup, and she scored 11 goals.

=== FC Panathinaikos, 2023–2024 ===
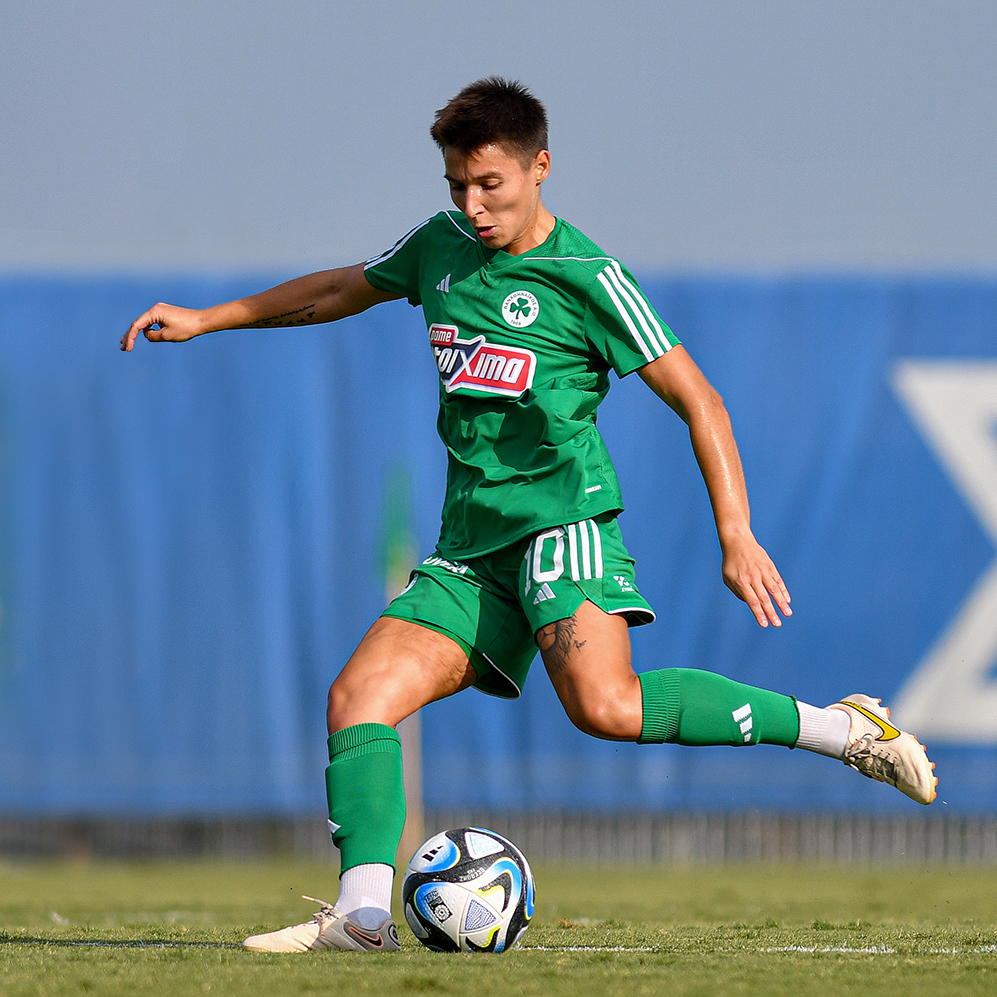
Rogan with Panathinaikos in 2023

On 1 August 2023, Rogan signed her first professional contract with the giant Greece club Panathinaikos. She started the 2023–24 season with debut in Greek A Division on 1 October 2023. She registered an assist on the only goal of the game, scored by Chelsea Domond, in a 0–1 away win against WFC Rea. Two weeks later, she provided four assists in a 5–2 win against WFC Kastoria GPO. Rogan scored her first goal for the club in a 0–2 away win against WFC AEL on 19 November 2023. As a midfielder, she can take shots from outside the area or inside the box. Rogan made 28 appearances in all competitions, contributing 7 goals and 19 assists, including 1 in Greek Women's Cup.

=== FC Nantes, 2025–2026 ===
In Januar 2025, Rogan signed new professional contract with France club FC Nantes. She made her debut in Première Ligue on 22 March 2025. She started in a first line-up against Montpellier HSC and registered an assist after taking a free kick on the first goal of the game, scored by Julie Pasquereau, which ended up a 2–2 draw. Rogan made 14 appearances in all competitions, contributing 1 assist.

=== FC New club, 2026–present ===
In October 2026, Rogan signed new professional contract with ...

== International career ==
Rogan played with the age group teams from under-15 to under-19. She was first called up to the Slovenia women's under-17 team in 2007. Later, she continued in under-19 team.

On 20 October 2013, Rogan received her first senior national team call-up for the 2015 FIFA Women's World Cup qualification. She made her competitive game debut when she was subbed on against Germany on 26 October 2013.

In September 2015, Rogan was called-up as part of Slovenia's squad for the UEFA Women's Euro 2017 qualifying cycle. On 19 October 2015, she started in a first line-up against Belarus. Rogan assisted Tjaša Tibaut's opening goal in a game that ended as a 3–0 win. On 8 April 2016, she played against Scotland, and Slovenia lost 3–1 away. In the next game, on 12 April 2016, Rogan started in a first line-up, and she scored her first ever international goal in an 8–1 win over Macedonia. On 16 September 2016, Rogan played against Iceland, and Slovenia lost 4–0 away. Four days later, she started in a first line-up against Belarus. The game ended up a 2–0. Slovenia finished the qualifying cycle in the third place.

In September 2017, Rogan was called-up for next cycle 2019 FIFA Women's World Cup qualification. On 16 September 2017, she played against Germany. The game ended up a 6–0. On 6 April 2018, she appeared under new head coach against Iceland. Slovenia lost 0–2. Four days later, Rogan started in a first line-up against Germany. The game ended up a 0–4. Slovenia finished qualifying cycle in the fourth place.

End of November 2020, Rogan received subsequent called-up for the UEFA Women's Euro 2022 qualifying. On 1 December 2020, she started in a first line-up against Estonia. In the second half, Estonia's goalkeeper scored an own goal, after Rogan taking a corner, and Slovenia won 2–0. In the next game, on 23 February 2021, she started in a first line-up against Estonia. The game ended up a 0–9 win. Slovenia finished qualifying cycle in the third place.

In September 2021, Rogan was called-up as an important part of Slovenia's squad for the 2023 FIFA Women's World Cup qualification cycle. In the first round away, on 17 September 2021, she played in a 0–4 win against Estonia. Four days later, Rogan played against France, and Slovenia lost 2–3 after a penalty in the last minute, what was a bitterly disappointed. In the next game, on 22 October 2021, she played a home round against Wales. Rogan scored the opening goal, on her birthday, in a game that ended as a 1–1 draw. Four days later, she started in a first line-up against Greece. Rogan registered an assist on the second goal of the game, scored by Mateja Zver, in a 1–4 away win. In the third round home, on 26 November 2021, she started in a first line-up against Estonia, and Slovenia won 6–0. Four days later, she started in a first line-up against Greece, and the game ended up a 0–0 draw. The fourth round away, on 8 April 2022, she started in a first line-up against Kazakhstan. Rogan registered an assist after taking a corner on the second goal of the game, scored by Kristina Erman, in a 0–2 away win. On 12 April 2022, she started in a first line-up against France, and Slovenia lost 1–0. In the last round, on 2 September 2022, she started in a first line-up against Kazakhstan. The game ended up a 2–0 win. The last game, on 6 September 2022, against Wales was decisive. Rogan started in a first line-up, but the game ended up a 0–0 draw. Slovenia finished the qualifying cycle in the third place.

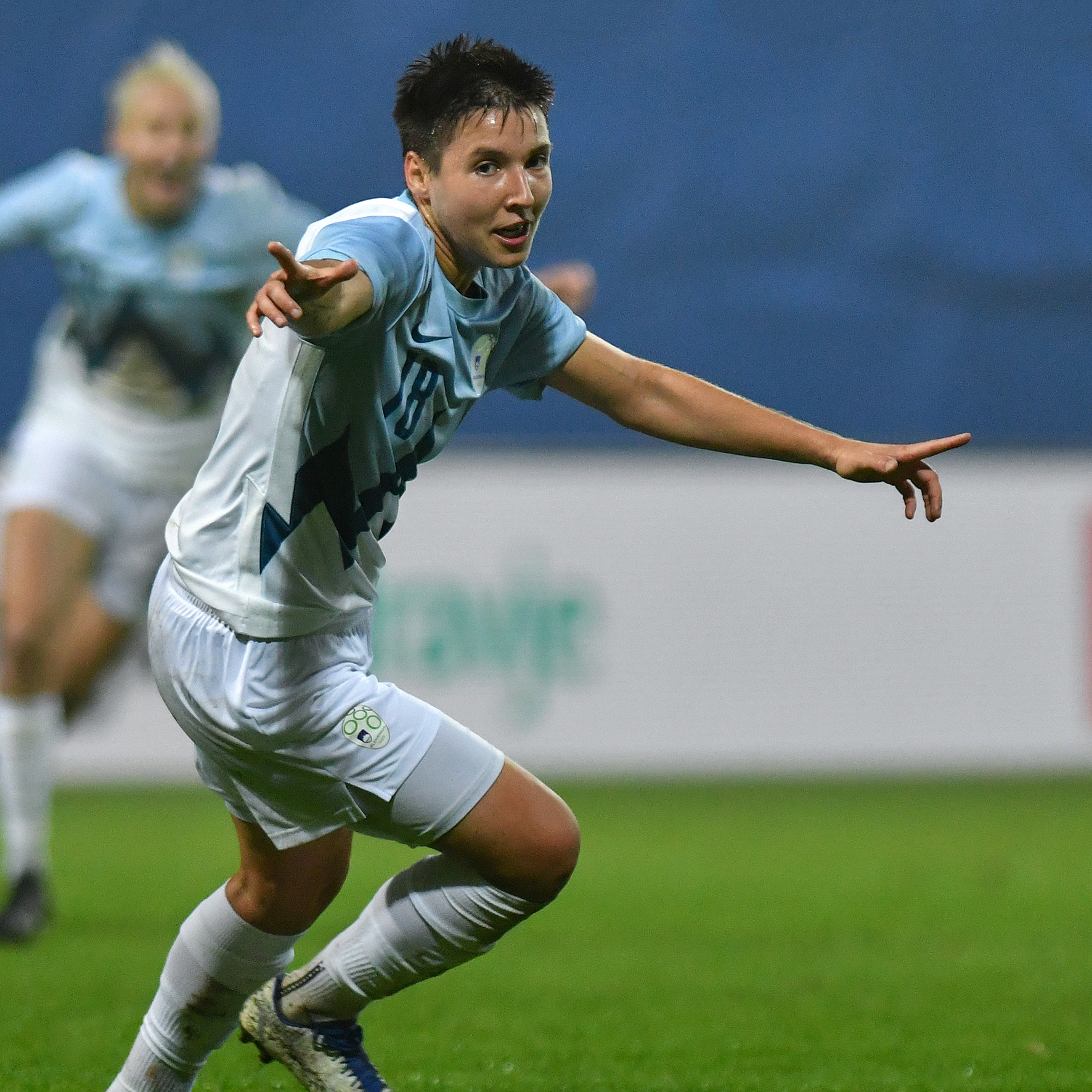
Rogan celebrating goal against Wales, Sports park Lendava, Slovenia, 22 October 2021

In February 2023, Rogan received call-up for winter preparation cycle. Slovenia women's national team participated in 2023 Turkish Women's Cup, the annual football tournament held in Alanya, Turkey. Rogan started games in a first line-up against Uzbekistan, and South Africa. She began action for the opening goal, scored by Adrijana Mori, in a 1–1 draw with South Africa. Slovenia was crowned champions of the tournament after finishing unbeaten in three games.

In September 2023, Rogan was called-up under new head coach for a new and innovative national team competition 2023–24 UEFA Women's Nations League B. On 22 September 2023, started in a first line-up against the Czech Republic, and the game ended up a 0–0 draw. Four days later, she played against Bosnia and Herzegovina, and the game ended up a 0–0 draw. On 1 December 2023, she played against Bosnia and Herzegovina, and Slovenia won 2–1. Four days later, she played against the Czech Republic. The game ended up a 0–4. Slovenia finished national team competition in the third place, and entered League C.

In February 2024, Rogan received call-up for winter preparation cycle. Slovenia women's national team participated in 2024 Pinatar Cup, an invitational football tournament held in San Pedro del Pinatar, Region of Murcia, Spain. She played against the Philippines. The team won 0–1 on aggregate, and Slovenia won the third place on the tournament.

== Career statistics ==
=== Club ===
As of match played 6 June 2026

Appearances and goals by club, season and competition
Club	Season	League			Cup		UWCL		Total	
Club	Season	Division	Apps	Goals	Apps	Goals	Apps	Goals	Apps	Goals
Mura	2010–11	1. SŽNL	13	4	3	0	—		16	4
Mura	2011–12	1. SŽNL	19	8	4	1	—		23	9
Mura	2012–13	1. SŽNL	19	15	4	1	3	3	26	19
Mura	2013–14	1. SŽNL	18	16	3	0	3	0	24	16
Mura	2014–15	1. SŽNL	17	12	2	1	5	2	24	15
Mura	2015–16	1. SŽNL	20	17	3	1	3	0	26	18
Mura	2016–17	1. SŽNL	20	12	3	0	3	2	26	14
Mura	Total		126	84	22	4	17	7	165	95
Split	2017–18	1. HNŽL	9	6	—		—		9	6
Split	Total		9	6	—		—		9	6
Olimpija Ljubljana	2017–18	1. SŽNL	8	7	1	1	—		9	8
Olimpija Ljubljana	2018–19	1. SŽNL	20	29	2	1	3	0	25	30
Olimpija Ljubljana	2019–20	1. SŽNL	12	12	1	1	—		13	13
Olimpija Ljubljana	2020–21	1. SŽNL	17	12	2	1	—		19	13
Olimpija Ljubljana	2021–22	1. SŽNL	20	18	3	2	—		23	20
Olimpija Ljubljana	2022–23	1. SŽNL	19	16	2	1	—		21	17
Olimpija Ljubljana	Total		96	94	11	7	3	0	110	101
Panathinaikos	2023–24	Greek A Division	26	7	2	0	—		28	7
Panathinaikos	Total		26	7	2	0	—		28	7
Nantes	2024–25	Première Ligue	6	—	—		—		6	—
Nantes	2025–26	Première Ligue	4	—	4	—	—		8	—
Nantes	Total		10	—	4	—	—	—	14	—
New club	2026–27									
New club	Total									
Career total			267	191	39	11	20	7	326	209

=== International ===
As of match played 27 February 2024

Appearances and goals by national team and year
National team	Year	Apps	Goals
Slovenia	2013	1	
Slovenia	2014	3	
Slovenia	2015	3	
Slovenia	2016	6	1
Slovenia	2017	6	
Slovenia	2018	3	
Slovenia	2019	0	
Slovenia	2020	1	
Slovenia	2021	9	1
Slovenia	2022	6	
Slovenia	2023	7	
Slovenia	2024	1	
Total		46	2

List of international goals scored by Manja Rogan
No.	Date	Venue	Opponent	Score	Result	Competition
1	12 April 2016	Lendava Sports Park, Lendava, Slovenia	Macedonia	8–1	8–1	UEFA Women's Euro 2017 qualifying
2	22 October 2021	Lendava Sports Park, Lendava, Slovenia	Wales	1–0	1–1	2023 FIFA Women's World Cup qualification

== Honours ==
NK Mura

- Slovenian Women's League: 2011–12, 2012–13, 2013–14, 2014–15, 2015–16; Runner-up: 2016–17
- Slovenian Cup: 2011–12, 2012–13, 2013–14, 2015–16, 2016–17; Runner-up: 2014–15
- The Double (League and Cup): 2011–12, 2012–13, 2013–14, 2015–16
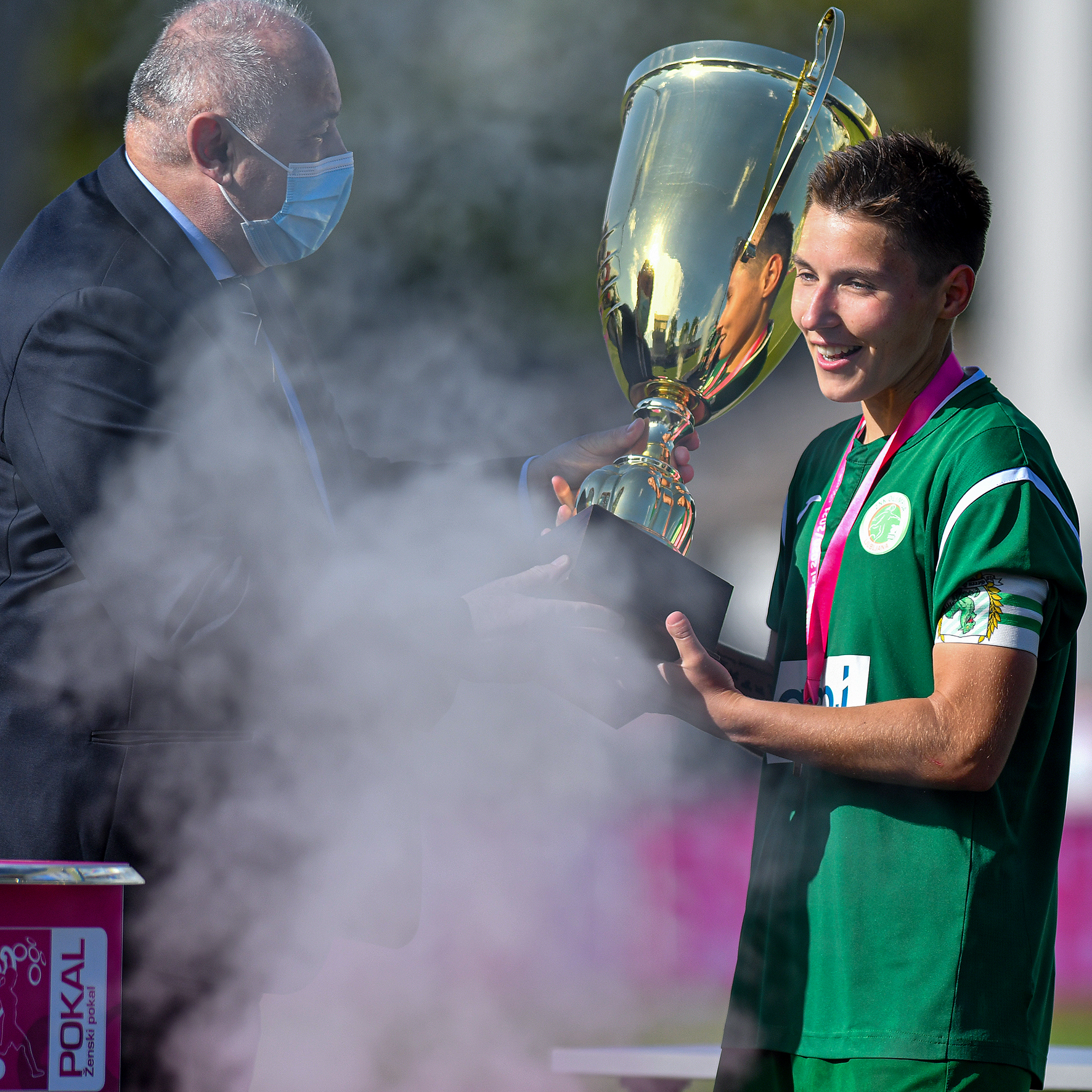
  Vice president of the Football Association of Slovenia Radenko Mijatović awarding Slovenian Cup trophy to captain Manja Rogan, 25 May 2021

WFC Olimpija Ljubljana

- Slovenian Women's League: 2017–18; Runners-up: 2018–19, 2020–21, 2021–22, 2022–23
- Slovenian Cup: 2020–21, 2021–22; Runner-up: 2022–23

Slovenia

- Turkish Women's Cup: 2023

Individual

- The Best Slovenian female footballer: 2016
- The Best 11 of Slovenian Women's League: 2015–16, 2018–19, 2021–22
- PSAPP Best 11 of Women's super league Greece: 2023–24
