= 2024–25 Slovenian Women's League =

Slovenian women's football league season

Slovenian Women's League
- Season: 2024–25
- Dates: 25 August 2024 – 18 May 2025
- Champions: Mura
- Champions League: Mura
- Matches: 117
- Goals: 698 (5.97 per match)
- Top goalscorer: (Slovenia) Mirjam Kastelec (40 Goals)
- All statistics correct as of 18 May 2025.

The 2024–25 season of the Slovenian Women's League is the 33rd edition of the top-tier of Slovenian women's football league.

Mura Nona are the defending champions, having won their eleventh title in the 2023–24 season.

The roster of clubs that successfully registered for the 2024–25 season has been published on 24 June 2024. On the same day, the calendar for the first half of the season has been published. The first 13 matchdays are to be played in the year 2024, starting on 25 August 2024.

== Tiebreakers for league ranking ==
The following criteria are applied to determine the order of the teams in all rounds of the league:

1. The total number of points;
2. Number of points earned in head-to-head matches;
3. Goal difference in head-to-head matches;
4. Goal difference in all league matches;
5. Number of goals scored in all league matches;
6. Lower disciplinary score;

If two or more teams are still equal after all the above criteria, the order is determined by a draw.

== Teams ==
Locations of teams in the 2024–25 1.SNŽL.

Team	Home city	Home ground	Capacity	2023–24 finish
Aluminij	Kidričevo	Aluminij Sports Park	600	DNC
Cerklje	Cerklje na Gorenjskem	Sports Park Velesovo	100 (Note: Estimate, official figure not available.)	6th
Gažon	Gažon	Nogometno igrišče Gažon	0 (Note: The field has no spectator stands.)	9th
Krim	Ljubljana	Nogometno igrišče Krim	0	7th
Ljubljana	Ljubljana	Igrišče NK Šmartno	0	3rd
MB Tabor	Maribor	Tabor Sports Park	0	DNC
Mura Nona	Murska Sobota	Fazanerija	3,782	1st
Olimpija Ljubljana	Ljubljana	Šiška Sports Park	2,308	2nd
Primorje Tosla Nutricosmetics	Ajdovščina	Nogometno igrišče Ajdovščina	0	5th
Radomlje Medex	Radomlje	Radomlje Sports Park	250	4th

== Regular season ==
=== League Table ===
Pos	Team	Pld	W	D	L	GF	GA	GD	Pts	Qualification
1	Mura Nona	18	18	0	0	145	8	+137	54	Advances to championship group
2	Olimpija Ljubljana	18	15	0	3	118	16	+102	45	Advances to championship group
3	Ljubljana	18	12	2	4	87	25	+62	38	Advances to championship group
4	Radomlje Medex	18	11	1	6	53	21	+32	34	Advances to championship group
5	Primorje Tosla Nutricosmetics	18	9	2	7	59	45	+14	29	Participates in second group
6	Krim	18	8	1	9	29	49	−20	25	Participates in second group
7	Cerklje	18	7	1	10	41	58	−17	22	Participates in second group
8	Aluminij	18	4	1	13	19	105	−86	13	Participates in second group
9	MB Tabor	18	2	0	16	16	133	−117	6	Participates in second group
10	Gažon	18	0	0	18	5	112	−107	0	Participates in second group

Updated to match(es) played on 23 March 2025. Source: NZS.si
Rules for classification: Tiebreakers

=== Results ===
Home \ Away	ALU	CER	GAŽ	KRI	LJU	MBT	MUR	OLI	PRI	RAD
Aluminij		0–4	4–1	3–5	1–1	4–1	0–10	0–12	0–8	0–6
Cerklje	5–1		4–0	1–1	0–3	6–1	0–5	0–5	1–2	0–1
Gažon	0–2	1–6		0–3	0–8	0–2	0–10	1–14	0–3	0–3
Krim	2–0	2–0	1–0		0–6	4–0	0–10	0–5	3–4	0–4
Ljubljana	17–0	8–1	13–0	1–0		11–0	1–2	1–5	4–1	2–1
MB Tabor	0–3	2–7	7–2	1–6	0–4		0–9	0–6	0–10	1–5
Mura Nona	5–0	12–0	7–0	5–1	9–1	24–0		3–0	9–0	5–1
Olimpija Ljubljana	9–0	9–1	13–0	7–0	4–3	20–0	1–3		1–3	1–0
Primorje Tosla Nutricosmetics	8–0	3–5	5–0	0–1	1–1	8–1	1–12	1–3		1–1
Radomlje Medex	11–1	2–0	7–0	2–0	0–2	4–0	2–5	0–3	3–0	

Updated to match(es) played on 23 March 2025. Source: NZS.si
Legend: Blue = home team win; Yellow = draw; Red = away team win.

== Championship group ==
=== League table ===
Pos	Team	Pld	W	D	L	GF	GA	GD	Pts	Qualification
1	Mura Nona	24	24	0	0	172	11	+161	72	Spot in the 2025–26 Champions League second qualifying round champions path
2	Ljubljana	24	15	2	7	93	38	+55	47	
3	Olimpija Ljubljana	24	15	0	9	118	36	+82	45	
4	Radomlje Medex	24	14	1	9	67	32	+35	43	

Updated to match(es) played on 18 May 2025. Source: NZS.si
Rules for classification: Tiebreakers

=== Results ===
Home \ Away	MUR	OLI	LJU	RAD
Mura Nona		5–0	3–0	4–1
Olimpija Ljubljana	0–5		0–1	0–3
Ljubljana	0–7	1–0		0–1
Radomlje Medex	2–3	5–0	2–4	

Updated to match(es) played on 18 May 2025. Source: NZS.si
Legend: Blue = home team win; Yellow = draw; Red = away team win.

== Relegation group ==
=== League table ===
Pos	Team	Pld	W	D	L	GF	GA	GD	Pts
1	Primorje Tosla Nutricosmetics	23	14	2	7	99	49	+50	44
2	Krim	23	11	2	10	37	53	−16	35
3	Cerklje	23	9	2	12	59	63	−4	29
4	Aluminij	23	5	2	16	24	125	−101	17
5	MB Tabor	23	2	2	19	22	158	−136	8
6	Gažon	23	1	1	21	7	133	−126	4

Updated to match(es) played on 18 May 2025. Source: NZS.si
Rules for classification: Tiebreakers

=== Results ===
Home \ Away	PRI	KRI	CER	ALU	MBT	GAŽ
Primorje Tosla Nutricosmetics		4–1		10–0		12–0
Krim			0–0		2–0	1–0
Cerklje	1–2			1–2		8–0
Aluminij		0–4			3–3	
MB Tabor		2–12	1–8			
Gažon				2–0	0–0	

Updated to match(es) played on 18 May 2025. Source: NZS.si
Legend: Blue = home team win; Yellow = draw; Red = away team win.

== Top scorers ==
As of 18 May 2025

Rank	Player	Club	Goals
1	(Slovenia) Mirjam Kastelec	Ljubljana	40
2	(Slovenia) Ana Milović	Olimpija Ljubljana	35
3	(Slovenia) Špela Kolbl	Mura Nona	34
4	(Ukraine) Yana Malakhova	Mura Nona	24
5	(Slovenia) Noelle Vilčnik	Mura Nona	23
6	(Slovenia) Sara Makovec	Mura Nona	20
7	(Slovenia) Gaja Bizjak	Primorje Tosla Nutricosmetics	20
8	(Slovenia) Anja Eferl	Mura Nona	19
9	(Slovenia) Barbara Kralj	Primorje Tosla Nutricosmetics	19
10	(Slovenia) Ula Omerzu	Radomlje Medex	19
11	(Slovenia) Zala Omerza	Olimpija Ljubljana	17
12	(Slovenia) Lea Dolinar	Mura Nona	17
13	(Slovenia) Manja Rogan	Olimpija Ljubljana	16
14	(Slovenia) Daša Dolenšek	Primorje Tosla Nutricosmetics	15
15	(Slovenia) Jerca Plevel	Cerklje	14
