= Lara Ivanuša =

Slovenian footballer (born 1997)

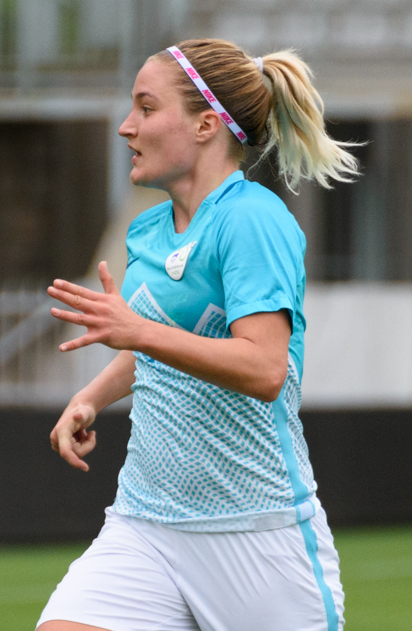

Personal information
- Full name: Lara Ivanuša
- Date of birth: 9 January 1997 (age 29)
- Place of birth: Slovenia
- Positions: Attacking midfielder; striker

Team information
- Current team: Abu Dhabi Country Club
- Number: 3

Senior career*
| Years | Team | Apps | (Gls) |
| 2012–2014 | ŽNK Radomlje | 21 | (29) |
| 2015–2017 | ŽNK Olimpija Ljubljana | 21 | (18) |
| 2017 | Kvarnsvedens IK | 13 | (1) |
| 2018 | ŽNK Olimpija Ljubljana | 8 | (4) |
| 2018–2019 | Glasgow City | | |
| 2019–2020 | U.P.C. Tavagnacco | 10 | (1) |
| 2020–2024 | Ferencvárosi TC | | |

International career
| 2012–2013 | Slovenia U17 | 6 | (5) |
| 2014 | Slovenia U19 | 3 | (1) |
| 2016–2023 | Slovenia | 35 | (2) |
- * Club domestic league appearances and goals

Lara Ivanuša (born 9 January 1997) is a Slovenian women's international footballer who plays as an attacking midfielder or striker for Abu Dhabi Country Club.

== Club career ==
In 2017, Ivanuša joined Damallsvenskan club Kvarnsvedens IK. On 20 February 2018, she returned to ŽNK Olimpija Ljubljana, where she scored four goals in 8 league appearances and helped the club win its second consecutive Slovenian Women's League title.

On 18 July 2018, she joined Glasgow City.

== International career ==
Ivanuša made her international debut in a Euro 2017 qualifier against Scotland in April 2016 in Paisley.

== Honours ==
=== Club ===
ŽNK Olimpija Ljubljana

- Slovenian Women's League: 2016–17, 2017–18
