= Adrijana Mori =

Slovenian footballer

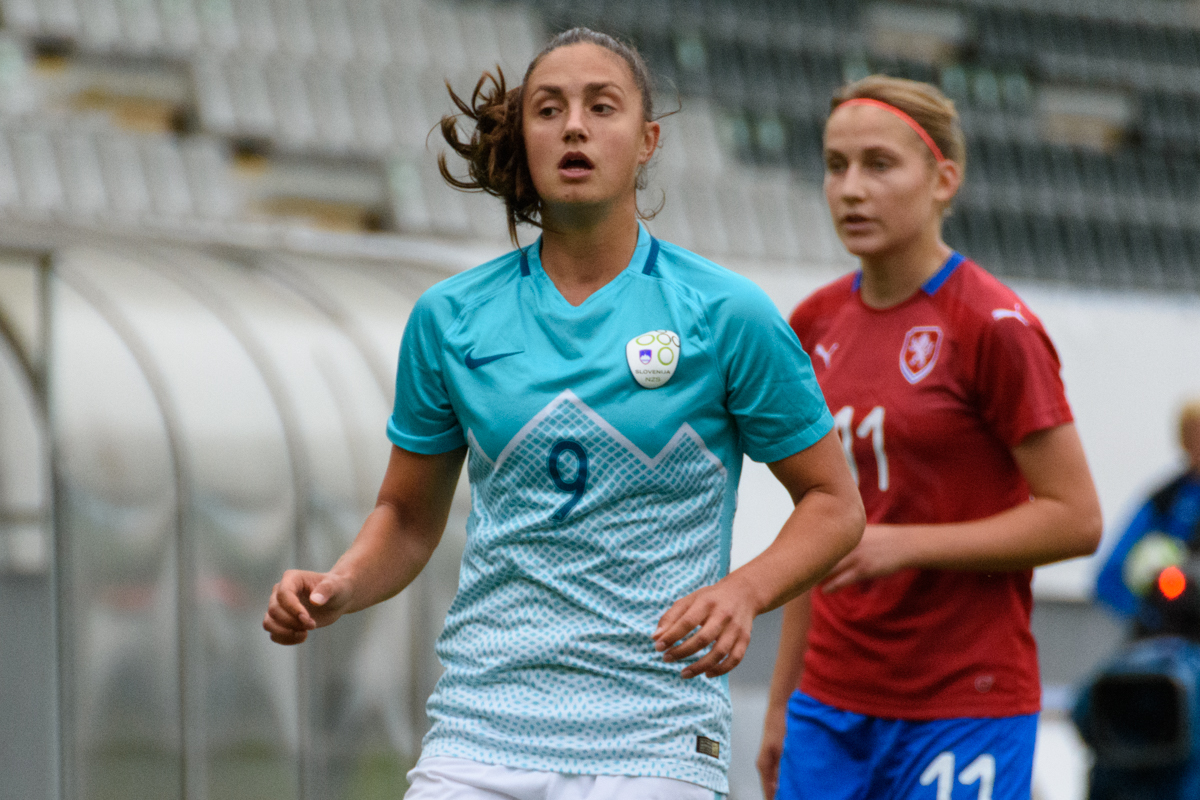
- Adrijana Mori (light blue kit) in 2018

Personal information
- Date of birth: 17 August 2000 (age 26)
- Place of birth: Slovenj Gradec, Slovenia
- Position: Forward

Team information
- Current team: ŽNK Mura
- Number: 9

Youth career
- –2013: Slovenj Gradec
- 2013–2015: Radlje ob Dravi
- 2016–2017: Fužinar

Senior career*
Years	Team	Apps	(Gls)
2016–2017	Fužinar	16	(11)
2017–2018	Olimpija Ljubljana	28	(32)
2019	Radomlje	2	(2)
2019–2021	Turbine Potsdam	3	(1)
2020–2021	Turbine Potsdam II	11	(3)
2021–2022	Carl Zeiss Jena	8	(0)
2022–2026	1. FFC Turbine Potsdam	11	(0)

International career^{‡}
2015–2017	Slovenia U17	9	(2)
2017–2019	Slovenia U19	12	(5)
2017–	Slovenia	21	(3)
- * Club domestic league appearances and goals as of 15 December 2020 ‡ National team caps and goals as of 23 February 2023

Adrijana Mori (born 17 August 2000) is a Slovenian footballer who plays as a forward for ŽNK Mura and has appeared for the Slovenia women's national team.

== Career ==
Mori has been capped for the Slovenia national team, appearing for the team during the 2019 FIFA Women's World Cup qualifying cycle.
