= Slovenian Women's League =

- Founded: 1992; 34 years ago
- Country: Slovenia
- Confederation: UEFA
- Divisions: 1
- Number of clubs: 11
- Level on pyramid: 1
- Domestic cup: Slovenian Women's Cup
- International cup: UEFA Women's Champions League
- Current champions: Mura (13th title) (2025–26)
- Most championships: Mura (13 titles)
- Broadcaster(s): Planet 2
- Website: nzs.si

The Slovenian Women's League (Slovene: Slovenska ženska nogometna liga; abbreviated as the SŽNL or 1. SŽNL), currently known as Ženska nogometna liga Triglav due to sponsorship reasons, is the top-level women's football league of Slovenia. It was founded in 1992 and currently features eleven teams.

The league champions earn a place in the following season's UEFA Women's Champions League.

== 2026–27 teams ==
Locations of teams in the 2026–27 season

| Team | Location |
|---|---|
| Aluminij | Kidričevo |
| Cerklje | Cerklje na Gorenjskem |
| Gažon | Gažon |
| Krim | Ljubljana |
| Ljubljana | Ljubljana |
| Maribor Malečnik | Malečnik |
| Mura | Murska Sobota |
| Olimpija | Ljubljana |
| Primorje | Ajdovščina |
| Radomlje | Radomlje |
| Žalec | Žalec |

== Winners ==
=== By season ===
All winners of the Slovenian Women's League

- 1992–93: Krim
- 1993–94: Tesar
- 1994–95: Ilirija
- 1995–96: Jarše
- 1996–97: Ilirija
- 1997–98: Ilirija
- 1998–99: Jarše
- 1999–2000: Rudar Škale
- 2000–01: Ilirija
- 2001–02: Rudar Škale
- 2002–03: Krka
- 2003–04: Krka
- 2004–05: Krka
- 2005–06: Pomurje
- 2006–07: Krka
- 2007–08: Krka
- 2008–09: Krka
- 2009–10: Krka
- 2010–11: Krka
- 2011–12: Pomurje
- 2012–13: Pomurje
- 2013–14: Pomurje
- 2014–15: Pomurje
- 2015–16: Pomurje
- 2016–17: Olimpija Ljubljana
- 2017–18: Olimpija Ljubljana
- 2018–19: Pomurje
- 2019–20: No winners (COVID-19 pandemic)
- 2020–21: Pomurje
- 2021–22: Pomurje
- 2022–23: Mura
- 2023–24: Mura
- 2024–25: Mura
- 2025–26: Mura

=== By titles ===
| Club | Titles |
|---|---|
| Mura (Note: Known as Pomurje between 2003 and 2022) | 13 |
| Krka | 8 |
| Ilirija | 4 |
| Jarše | 2 |
| Rudar Škale | 2 |
| Olimpija Ljubljana | 2 |
| Krim | 1 |
| Tesar | 1 |

== Top scorers ==
The following is a list of the league's top scorers since the 2000–01 season. Tanja Vrabel have won the award a record six times, all in consecutive seasons between 2008–09 and 2013–14. In the 2025–26 season, Ana Milović achieved the highest number of goals per season, scoring 75 goals in 26 games. In 16 out of 26 seasons since 2000–01, the top scorer came from the ranks of ŽNK Pomurje (now ŽNK Mura), including 11 consecutive seasons between 2008–09 and 2018–19.

| Season | Top scorer | Club | Goals (apps) |
|---|---|---|---|
| 2000–01 | Anica Korpič | Rudar Škale | 32 (11) |
| 2001–02 | Anica Korpič | Rudar Škale | 43 (18) |
| 2002–03 | Anica Korpič | Odranci / Rudar Škale | 44 (16) |
| 2003–04 | Karmen Vais | Krka | 57 (18) |
| 2004–05 | Anica Korpič | Pomurje | 43 (19) |
| 2005–06 | Karmen Vais | Pomurje | 27 (18) |
| 2006–07 | Mateja Zver | Pomurje | 61 (21) |
| 2007–08 | Natalija Golob | Slovenj Gradec | 38 (20) |
| 2008–09 | Tanja Vrabel | Pomurje | 33 (17) |
| 2009–10 | Tanja Vrabel | Pomurje | 30 (14) |
| 2010–11 | Tanja Vrabel | Pomurje | 50 (20) |
| 2011–12 | Tanja Vrabel | Pomurje | 36 (20) |
| 2012–13 | Tanja Vrabel | Pomurje | 44 (18) |
| 2013–14 | Tanja Vrabel | Pomurje | 49 (19) |
| 2014–15 | Monika Conjar | Pomurje | 51 (18) |
| 2015–16 | Monika Conjar; Tjaša Tibaut | Pomurje | 42 (19); 42 (20) |
| 2016–17 | Monika Conjar | Pomurje | 44 (21) |
| 2017–18 | Špela Kolbl | Pomurje | 31 (17) |
| 2018–19 | Špela Kolbl | Pomurje | 46 (21) |
| 2019–20 | Ana Milović | Olimpija | 29 (12) |
| 2020–21 | Nina Kajzba | Pomurje | 32 (14) |
| 2020–21 | Kaja Korošec | Pomurje | 32 (17) |
| 2020–21 | Ana Milović | Olimpija | 32 (13) |
| 2021–22 | Ana Milović | Olimpija | 66 (19) |
| 2022–23 | Ana Milović | Olimpija | 51 (19) |
| 2023–24 | Sara Makovec | Olimpija | 35 (22) |
| 2024–25 | Mirjam Kastelec | Ljubljana | 40 (22) |
| 2025–26 | Ana Milović | Mura | 75 (26) |
