= Tanja Vrabel =

Slovenian footballer

Personal information
- Full name: Tanja Vrabel
- Date of birth: 22 December 1990 (age 35)
- Place of birth: SFR Yugoslavia
- Position: Striker

Team information
- Current team: Pomurje
- Number: 4

Senior career*
Years	Team	Apps	(Gls)
2006–	Pomurje	137	(284)

International career
- Slovenia
- * Club domestic league appearances and goals as of 9 June 2014

Tanja Vrabel is a Slovenian football striker currently playing for Pomurje in the Slovenian League. She was the league's top scorer in 2009, 2010, 2011, 2012, 2013 and 2014.

She is a member of the Slovenian national team.
