= Lana Golob =

Slovenian footballer (born 1999)

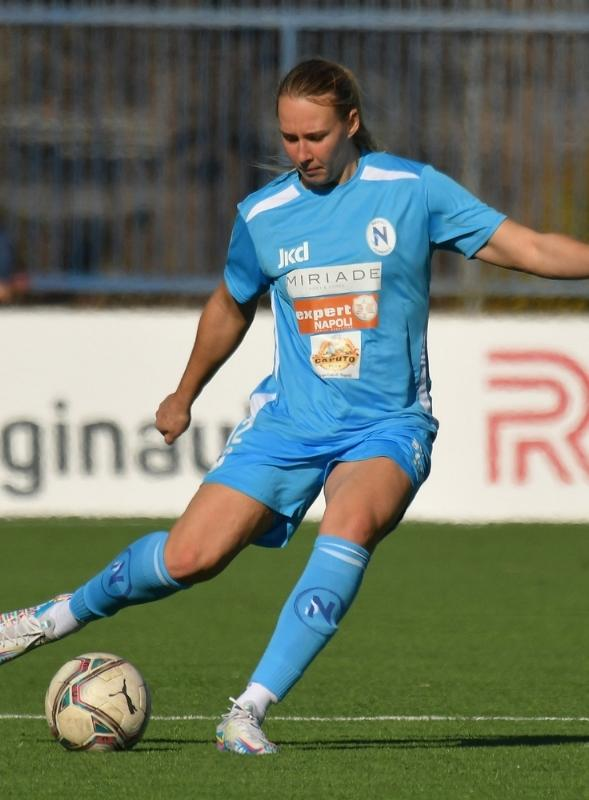
- Golob with Napoli in 2022

Personal information
- Date of birth: 26 October 1999 (age 27)
- Height: 1.77 m (5 ft 10 in)
- Position: Defender

Team information
- Current team: Porto

Youth career
- Šmartno 1928
- Rudar Škale

College career
| Years | Team | Apps | (Gls) |
| 2018–2021 | VCU Rams | 60 | (7) |

Senior career*
| Years | Team | Apps | (Gls) |
| 2016–2017 | Rudar Škale | 21 | (3) |
| 2017–2018 | Radomlje | 15 | (1) |
| 2020 | Pomurje | 8 | (0) |
| 2022 | Napoli | 10 | (1) |
| 2022–2023 | Basel | 5 | (0) |
| 2023 | Pomigliano | 12 | (0) |
| 2023–2024 | OH Leuven | 11 | (1) |
| 2024–2025 | Bologna | 23 | (2) |
| 2025–2026 | Glasgow City | 21 | (3) |
| 2026– | Porto | 0 | (0) |

International career^{‡}
| 2016–2017 | Slovenia U19 | 9 | (0) |
| 2018– | Slovenia | 55 | (4) |
- * Club domestic league appearances and goals as of 1 September 2026 ‡ National team caps and goals as of 13 October 2026

Lana Golob (born 26 October 1999) is a Slovenian footballer who plays as a defender for Campeonato Nacional Feminino club Porto and the Slovenia national team.

== Career ==
Golob has been capped for the Slovenia national team, appearing for the team during the 2019 FIFA Women's World Cup qualifying cycle.
