= Kristina Erman =

Slovenian footballer (born 1993)

Personal information
- Full name: Kristina Erman
- Date of birth: 28 June 1993 (age 33)
- Place of birth: Celje, Slovenia
- Height: 1.67 m (5 ft 6 in)
- Position: Left back

Senior career*
Years	Team	Apps	(Gls)
2010–2012	ŽNK Krka		
2013	ŽNK Pomurje	8	(1)
2014	Torres	9	(0)
2014–2015	Riviera di Romagna	23	(2)
2015–2017	FC Twente	37	(0)
2017–2019	PSV	31	(2)
2019–2020	Ferencváros		
2020	Arna-Bjørnar	13	(2)
2021	Pomigliano	10	(0)
2021	ÍBV	4	(0)
2022–2023	Fortuna Sittard	3	(0)

International career^{‡}
2010–2011	Slovenia U19	12	(6)
2010–2023	Slovenia	48	(1)
- * Club domestic league appearances and goals as of 23:55, 21 November 2022 (UTC) ‡ National team caps and goals as of 00:00, 22 November 2022 (UTC)

Kristina Erman (born 28 June 1993) is a Slovenian former professional footballer who primarily played as a left-back.

== Career ==
In May 2021, Erman signed with ÍBV of the Icelandic top-tier Úrvalsdeild kvenna.

== International goals ==
No.	Date	Venue	Opponent	Score	Result	Competition
1.	15 February 2023	Miracle Sports Complex, Alanya, Turkey	Uzbekistan	2–0	2–1	2023 Turkish Women's Cup

== Honours ==
Twente

Winner

- Eredivisie: 2015–16

Runner-up

- Eredivisie: 2016–17

Torres Runner-up

- Serie A: 2013–14
- Italian Women's Cup: 2013–14

ŽNK Krka Winner

- Slovenian Women's League: 2010–11
