= Izabela Križaj =

Slovenian footballer (born 2000)

Personal information
- Date of birth: 11 May 2000 (age 26)
- Position: Midfielder

Team information
- Current team: St. Pölten

Youth career
- 2013–2016: Ajdovščina
- 2016–2017: Rudar Škale
- 2017–2018: Radomlje

Senior career*
Years	Team	Apps	(Gls)
2016–2017	Rudar Škale	17	(6)
2017–2019	Radomlje	27	(4)
2020–2024	Olimpija Ljubljana	13	(7)
2024–	St. Pölten	6	(0)

International career^{‡}
2015–2017	Slovenia U17	8	(0)
2017–2018	Slovenia U19	9	(0)
2018–	Slovenia	4	(0)
- * Club domestic league appearances and goals as of 22 May 2021. ‡ National team caps and goals as of 12 June 2021.

Izabela Križaj (born 11 May 2000) is a Slovenian footballer who plays as a midfielder for ÖFB Frauen Bundesliga club SKN St. Pölten and the Slovenia women's national team.

== Club career ==
Križaj is a Ajdovščina product. She has played for ŽNK Rudar Škale, ŽNK Radomlje and Olimpija Ljubljana in Slovenia.

== International career ==
Križaj made her senior debut for Slovenia on 8 November 2018 as a 90th-minute substitution in a 2–0 friendly home win over Albania.
