= Radica Choneva =

Macedonian footballer

Personal information
- Date of birth: 8 November 2001 (age 25)
- Position: Striker

Team information
- Current team: Istatov

Senior career*
Years	Team	Apps	(Gls)
2015–	Istatov		

International career^{‡}
2018–2019	North Macedonia U-19	5	(0)
2021–	North Macedonia	1	(0)
- * Club domestic league appearances and goals ‡ National team caps and goals as of 13:00, 8 December 2021 (UTC)

Radica Choneva (born 8 November 2001) is a Macedonian footballer who plays as a striker for Istatov and the North Macedonia national team.

== International career ==
Choneva made her debut for the North Macedonia national team on 25 November 2021, coming on as a substitute for Kristina Petrushevska against Northern Ireland.
