= Nina Kajzba =

Slovenian footballer (born 2004)

Personal information
- Date of birth: 4 April 2004 (age 22)
- Position: Forward

Team information
- Current team: Zürich Frauen
- Number: 14

Youth career
- Rudar Škale
- Pomurje

Senior career*
| Years | Team | Apps | (Gls) |
| 2020–2021 | Pomurje | 14 | (32) |
| 2021–2024 | Roma | 1 | (0) |
| 2023–2024 | → Napoli (loan) | 15 | (0) |
| 2024–2026 | Parma | 38 | (5) |
| 2026 | → Standard Liège (loan) | 12 | (9) |
| 2026– | Zürich Frauen | 8 | (8) |

International career^{‡}
| 2019 | Slovenia U17 | 6 | (1) |
| 2021–2023 | Slovenia U19 | 8 | (1) |
| 2021– | Slovenia | 33 | (6) |
- * Club domestic league appearances and goals as of 7 October 2026 ‡ National team caps and goals as of 13 October 2026

Nina Kajzba (born 4 April 2004) is a Slovenian footballer who plays as a forward for Swiss Super League club Zürich Frauen and the Slovenia national team.

== Club career ==
Kajzba played for Pomurje in the 2020–21 UEFA Women's Champions League.

In July 2026, Kajzba joined Swiss Super League club Zürich Frauen from Parma.

== International career ==
Kajzba made her senior debut for Slovenia on 13 April 2021 during a 5–0 friendly home win over Slovakia.
