= Monika Conjar =

Croatian women's football forward

Monika Conjar Lovrić
Personal information
- Full name: Monika Conjar Lovrić
- Date of birth: 21 April 1995 (age 31)
- Place of birth: Zagreb, Croatia
- Position: Forward

Team information
- Current team: Osijek

Senior career*
| Years | Team | Apps | (Gls) |
| 2011-2013 | Agram | 37 | (41) |
| 2013–2017 | Pomurje | 77 | (173) |
| 2017–2019 | Split | 34 | (46) |
| 2019 | Osijek | 20 | (25) |

International career^{‡}
| 2011–2012 | Croatia U17 | | |
| 2011–2014 | Croatia U19 | | |
| 2012– | Croatia | 35 | (5) |
- * Club domestic league appearances and goals ‡ National team caps and goals as of 20 November 2019

Monika Conjar Lovrić (born 21 April 1995) is a Croatian football forward currently playing for Osijek in the Prva HNLŽ, and the Croatia national team.

== Personal life ==
She is married to Croatian footballer Kristijan Lovrić.
