= Luana Zajmi =

Slovenian footballer

Personal information
- Date of birth: 29 January 2002 (age 24)
- Place of birth: Murska Sobota, Slovenia
- Position: Midfielder

Team information
- Current team: AP Orlen Gdańsk
- Number: 24

Youth career
- 2008–2018: Pomurje

Senior career*
Years	Team	Apps	(Gls)
2018–2021	Pomurje	52	(36)
2021–2022	Leicester City	0	(0)
2022	→ Blackburn Rovers (loan)	0	(0)
2022	Pomurje	1	(0)
2022–2023	Split	29	(13)
2024	ALG Spor	10	(0)
2024–2025	Pogoń Szczecin	13	(2)
2025–	AP Orlen Gdańsk	18	(0)

International career
2017–2019	Slovenia U17		
2019	Slovenia U19		
2022–2023	Slovenia	6	(0)
- * Club domestic league appearances and goals as of 20:57, 2 June 2026 (UTC)

Luana Zajmi (born 29 January 2002) is a Slovenian professional footballer who plays as a midfielder for Ekstraliga club AP Orlen Gdańsk.

== International career ==
Between 2017 and 2019, Zajmi represented Slovenia at youth international level, playing for the under-17 and under-19 sides. In January 2020, she received a call-up from the senior team for a training camp.

On 5 February 2021, Zajmi again received a call-up from Slovenia for the final UEFA Euro 2022 qualifying match against Estonia. Two weeks later, however, she accepted a call-up from Albania for a seven-day training camp in Ulcinj, but the next day she was included in Slovenia's extended squad for the match against Estonia, in which she did not become part of the final team. On 12 November 2022, Zajmi made her debut with Slovenia in a friendly match against Kosovo after coming on as a substitute in the 88th minute in place of Kaja Korošec.

== Personal life ==
Zajmi was born in Slovenia to Kosovo Albanian parents. On 7 April 2022, she obtained Albanian passport.

== Honours ==
Pomurje

- Slovenian Women's League: 2020–21
- Slovenian Women's Cup runner-up: 2020–21
