= Tjaša Tibaut =

Slovenian footballer (born 1989)

Personal information
- Date of birth: 9 February 1989 (age 37)
- Place of birth: Murska Sobota, SFR Yugoslavia
- Position: Forward

Team information
- Current team: Ljubljana
- Number: 18

Senior career*
Years	Team	Apps	(Gls)
2004–2017	Pomurje	244	(267)
2017–2018	Olimpija Ljubljana	17	(18)
2018–2020	Pomurje	33	(34)
2020	Tavagnacco	3	(0)
2020	Fylkir	3	(0)
2020–2021	Pomurje	6	(3)
2022–	Ljubljana	30	(11)

International career
- Slovenia U19
2007–2017	Slovenia	63	(11)
- * Club domestic league appearances and goals as of 26 October 2023

Tjaša Tibaut (born 9 February 1989) is a Slovenian footballer who plays as a forward for Ljubljana. Between 2007 and 2017, she earned 51 appearances for the Slovenia national team.
