= Elena Paneska =

Macedonian footballer

Personal information
- Date of birth: 10 July 2002 (age 24)
- Positions: Defender; midfielder

Senior career*
Years	Team	Apps	(Gls)
2019–2020	Dragon		
2020–	Kamenica Sasa		

International career^{‡}
2017–2018	North Macedonia U-17	6	(0)
2019	North Macedonia U-19	3	(0)
2021–	North Macedonia	1	(0)
- * Club domestic league appearances and goals ‡ National team caps and goals as of 13:20, 8 December 2021 (UTC)

Elena Paneska (born 10 July 2002) is a Macedonian footballer who plays as a defender and midfielder for Kamenica Sasa and the North Macedonia national team.

== International career ==
Paneska made her debut for the North Macedonia national team on 25 November 2021, coming on as a substitute for Viktorija Nedeva against Northern Ireland.
