= ŽNK Slovenj Gradec =

Slovenj Gradec
- Full name: Ženski nogometni klub Slovenj Gradec
- Founded: 2004; 21 years ago
Home colours	Away colours

Ženski nogometni klub Slovenj Gradec (English: Women's Football Club Slovenj Gradec), commonly referred to as ŽNK Slovenj Gradec or simply Slovenj Gradec, was a Slovenian women's football club from the town of Slovenj Gradec.

== Honours ==
- Slovenian League
  - Runners-up (3): 2008–09, 2009–10, 2011–12
- Slovenian Cup
  - Runners-up (2): 2006–07, 2009–10
