= Ana Milović =

Slovenian footballer (born 2001)

Personal information
- Date of birth: 31 July 2001 (age 25)
- Position: Forward

Team information
- Current team: Olimpija Ljubljana

Youth career
- Radomlje

Senior career*
Years	Team	Apps	(Gls)
2017–2018	Radomlje	7	(1)
2018–2024	Olimpija Ljubljana	107	(276)
2024–2025	Slavia Prague	10	(1)
2025–2026	Mura	26	(75)
2026–	Olimpija Ljubljana	2	(10)

International career^{‡}
2017–	Slovenia	32	(3)
- * Club domestic league appearances and goals as of 16 August 2026 ‡ National team caps and goals as of 8 April 2025

Ana Milović (born 31 July 2001) is a Slovenian footballer who plays as a forward for Olimpija Ljubljana and the Slovenia women's national team.

== Club career ==
In the curtailed 2019–20 Slovenian Women's League season, Milović scored 29 goals in 12 appearances for Olimpija to finish as the top scorer.

== International career ==
Milović has been capped for the Slovenia national team, appearing for the team during the 2019 FIFA Women's World Cup qualifying cycle. She won her first senior cap in a 4–0 defeat against the Czech Republic on 20 October 2017, and scored her first national team goal in a 3–0 UEFA Women's Euro 2022 qualifying win over Kosovo on 10 March 2020.
