= Sara Makovec =

Slovenian football player (born 2000)

Personal information
- Date of birth: 31 March 2000 (age 26)
- Place of birth: Slovenia
- Position: Midfielder

Team information
- Current team: SKN St. Pölten
- Number: 16

Youth career
- Pomurje

Senior career*
Years	Team	Apps	(Gls)
2016–2022	Pomurje	107	(77)
2022–2024	Olimpija Ljubljana	37	(58)
2024	Mura	12	(20)
2025–	SKN St. Pölten	10	(1)

International career^{‡}
2017–	Slovenia	51	(2)
- * Club domestic league appearances and goals as of 25 May 2025 ‡ National team caps and goals as of 26 June 2025

Sara Makovec (born 31 March 2000) is a Slovenian footballer who plays as a midfielder for ÖFB Frauen Bundesliga club SKN St. Pölten and the Slovenia women's national team.

== Career ==
Makovec has been capped for the Slovenia national team, appearing for the team during the 2019 FIFA Women's World Cup qualifying cycle.
