= ŽNK Krka =

Krka
- Full name: Ženski nogometni klub Krka Novo mesto
- Nickname(s): Farmacevtke (The Pharmacists)
- Founded: 1998; 27 years ago
- Dissolved: 2016; 9 years ago
- Ground: Portoval
- Capacity: 500
Home colours	Away colours

Ženski nogometni klub Krka (English: Women's Football Club Krka), commonly referred to as ŽNK Krka or simply Krka, was a Slovenian women's football club from Novo Mesto. Krka won the Slovenian Women's League eight times, and played several seasons in UEFA competitions. Their best international result was reaching the round of 32 in the 2010–11 UEFA Women's Champions League. Krka was dissolved in 2016.

== Honours ==
- Slovenian League
  - Winners (8): 2002–03, 2003–04, 2004–05, 2006–07, 2007–08, 2008–09, 2009–10, 2010–11
- Slovenian Cup
  - Winners (5): 2003–04, 2005–06, 2007–08, 2008–09, 2009–10

== Record in UEFA competitions ==
Krka goals always listed first.

Season	Competition	Stage	Result	Opponent
2003–04	UEFA Women's Cup	Qualifying stage	2–4	(Israel) Maccabi Holon
			w/o	(Belgium) Beleke-Aalst
			1–0	(Estonia) Visa Tallinn
2004–05	UEFA Women's Cup	Qualifying stage	2–1	(Finland) MPS Malmin
			0–2	(Netherlands) Ter Leede
			2–1	(Iceland) KR Reykjavík
		Group stage	1–7	(Sweden) Umeå
			0–2	(Serbia) Mašinac Niš
			0–4	(Belarus) Bobruichanka
2005–06	UEFA Women's Cup	Qualifying stage	1–2	(Slovakia) PVFA Bratislava
			0–1	(Bosnia and Herzegovina) Sarajevo
			0–5	(Russia) Lada Togliatti
2007–08	UEFA Women's Cup	Qualifying stage	0–4	(Spain) Athletic Bilbao
			0–5	(Italy) Bardolino
			5–1	(Malta) Birkirkara
2008–09	UEFA Women's Cup	Qualifying stage	0–6	(Austria) Neulengbach
			1–1	(Portugal) 1º Dezembro
			9–0	(Cyprus) Vamos Idaliou
2009–10	UEFA Women's Champions League	Qualifying stage	0–2	(Turkey) Trabzonspor
			2–2	(Slovakia) Slovan Duslo Šaľa
			0–3	(Italy) Torres
2010–11	UEFA Women's Champions League	Qualifying stage	4–0	(Georgia (country)) Baia Zugdidi
			4–0	(Wales) Swansea City
			1–4	(Italy) Bardolino
		Round of 32	0–7, 0–5	(Sweden) Linköping
2011–12	UEFA Women's Champions League	Qualifying stage	1–2	(Estonia) Pärnu
			0–7	(Republic of Ireland) Peamount United
			0–4	(Spain) Rayo Vallecano

== See also ==
- NK Krka, men's team
