= Mateja Zver =

Slovenian footballer (born 1988)

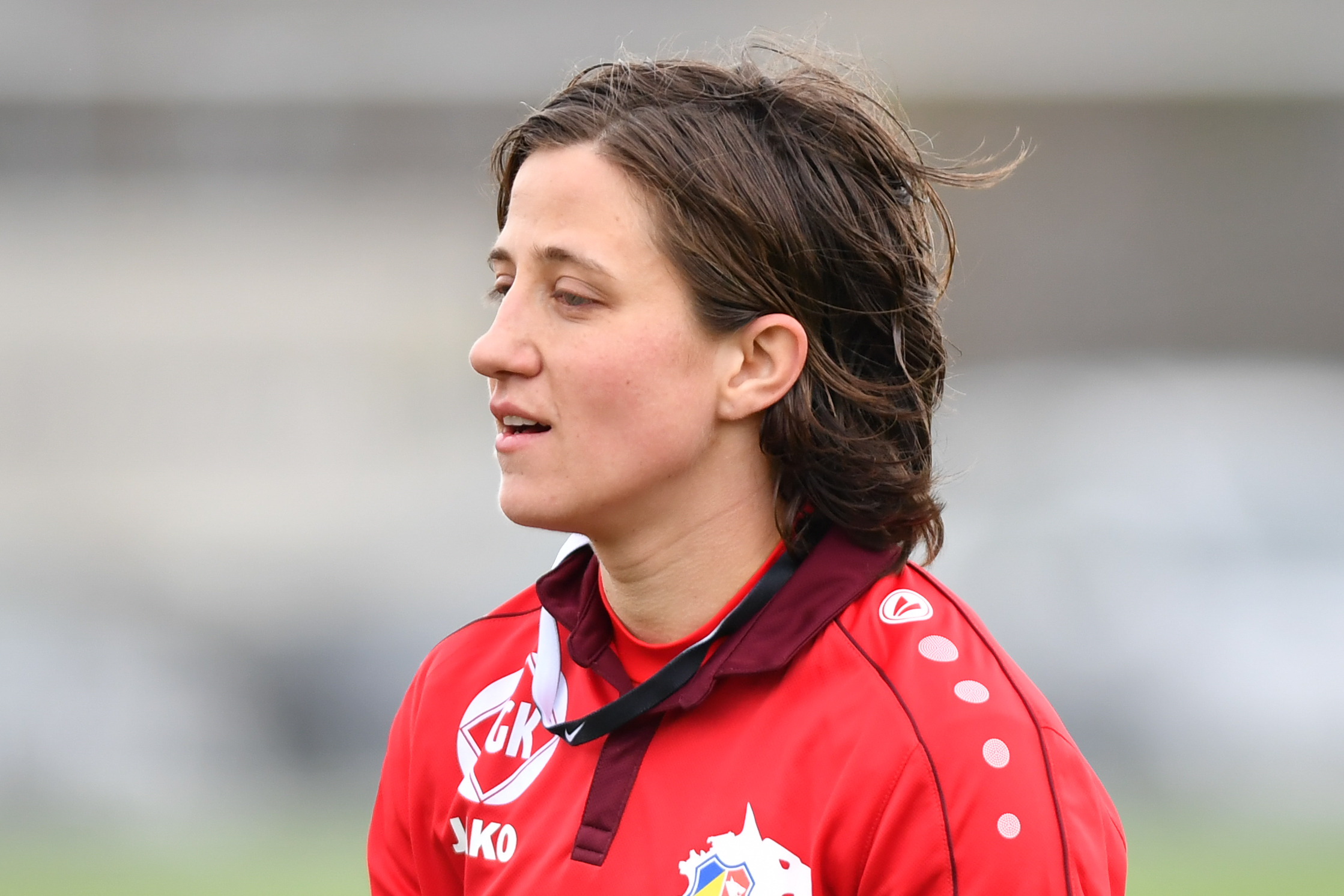
- Zver in 2017

Personal information
- Date of birth: 15 March 1988 (age 38)
- Height: 1.65 m (5 ft 5 in)
- Position: Midfielder

Team information
- Current team: Mura
- Number: 24

Youth career
- Odranci

Senior career*
Years	Team	Apps	(Gls)
2001–2015	Odranci / Pomurje	178	(276)
2008–2013	→ Þór/KA (loan)	80	(61)
2015–2025	SKN St. Pölten	163	(100)
2025–2026	Ankara BB Fomget	22	(3)
2026–	Mura	4	(4)

International career^{‡}
2007–	Slovenia	129	(56)
- * Club domestic league appearances and goals as of 30 September 2026 ‡ National team caps and goals as of 13 October 2026

Mateja Zver (born 15 March 1988) is a Slovenian footballer who plays as a midfielder for Mura. She was the top scorer of the 2006–07 Slovenian League with 61 goals, which stood as a record for 15 years before being surpassed by Ana Milović in 2022.

== Club career ==
In June 2025, Zver moved to Turkey and signed with the Super League club Ankara BB Fomget.

== International career ==
Zver is a member of the Slovenia national team, and has served as the team's captain.

== Career statistics ==
As of match played 24 May 2025

Appearances and goals by club, season, and competition
Club	Season	League			National cup		Continental		Total	
Club	Season	Division	Apps	Goals	Apps	Goals	Apps	Goals	Apps	Goals
Odranci / Pomurje (Note: The club was known as ŽNK Odranci until 2003.)	2001–02	Slovenian Women's League	0	0	1	0	0	0	1	0
Odranci / Pomurje	2002–03	Slovenian Women's League	9	9	0	0	0	0	9	9
Odranci / Pomurje	2003–04	Slovenian Women's League	18	22	1	1	0	0	19	23
Odranci / Pomurje	2004–05	Slovenian Women's League	20	32	4	1	0	0	24	33
Odranci / Pomurje	2005–06	Slovenian Women's League	19	25	3	4	0	0	22	29
Odranci / Pomurje	2006–07	Slovenian Women's League	21	61	4	8	3	4	28	73
Odranci / Pomurje	2007–08	Slovenian Women's League	17	25	1	0	0	0	18	25
Odranci / Pomurje	2008–09	Slovenian Women's League	10	22	1	0	0	0	11	22
Odranci / Pomurje	2009–10	Slovenian Women's League	5	6	0	0	0	0	5	6
Odranci / Pomurje	2010–11	Slovenian Women's League	11	9	2	0	0	0	13	9
Odranci / Pomurje	2011–12	Slovenian Women's League	14	11	3	3	0	0	17	14
Odranci / Pomurje	2012–13	Slovenian Women's League	14	24	2	5	3	3	19	32
Odranci / Pomurje	2013–14	Slovenian Women's League	12	13	2	0	0	0	14	13
Odranci / Pomurje	2014–15	Slovenian Women's League	8	17	0	0	5	4	13	21
Odranci / Pomurje	Total		178	276	24	22	11	11	213	309
Þór/KA (loan) (Note: In 2008, 2009, 2010, 2011 and 2013, Zver played for Þór/KA on loan between May and September of each year, when the Slovenian League had a break before the new season.)	2008	Úrvalsdeild	9	10	0	0	0	0	9	10
Þór/KA (loan)	2009	Úrvalsdeild	18	20	1	0	0	0	19	20
Þór/KA (loan)	2010	Úrvalsdeild	18	16	2	1	0	0	20	17
Þór/KA (loan)	2011	Úrvalsdeild	18	9	1	0	2	0	21	9
Þór/KA (loan)	2013	Úrvalsdeild	17	6	4	0	2	0	23	6
Þór/KA (loan)	Total		80	61	8	1	4	0	92	62
FSK St. Pölten-Spratzern / SKN St. Pölten (Note: In 2016, FSK St. Pölten integrated into SKN St. Pölten.)	2014–15	ÖFB Frauen Bundesliga	9	2	2	1	0	0	11	3
FSK St. Pölten-Spratzern / SKN St. Pölten	2015–16	ÖFB Frauen Bundesliga	12	6	2	0	2	0	16	6
FSK St. Pölten-Spratzern / SKN St. Pölten	2016–17	ÖFB Frauen Bundesliga	18	16	4	7	2	0	24	23
FSK St. Pölten-Spratzern / SKN St. Pölten	2017–18	ÖFB Frauen Bundesliga	14	9	3	4	1	0	18	13
FSK St. Pölten-Spratzern / SKN St. Pölten	2018–19	ÖFB Frauen Bundesliga	17	19	5	9	2	0	24	28
FSK St. Pölten-Spratzern / SKN St. Pölten	2019–20	ÖFB Frauen Bundesliga	9	13	2	3	2	0	13	16
FSK St. Pölten-Spratzern / SKN St. Pölten	2020–21	ÖFB Frauen Bundesliga	16	10	0	0	5	3	21	13
FSK St. Pölten-Spratzern / SKN St. Pölten	2021–22	ÖFB Frauen Bundesliga	16	13	3	2	2	1	21	16
FSK St. Pölten-Spratzern / SKN St. Pölten	2022–23	ÖFB Frauen Bundesliga	17	6	4	2	10	6	31	14
FSK St. Pölten-Spratzern / SKN St. Pölten	2023–24	ÖFB Frauen Bundesliga	16	5	5	3	9	0	30	8
FSK St. Pölten-Spratzern / SKN St. Pölten	2024–25	ÖFB Frauen Bundesliga	19	1	2	0	7	2	28	3
FSK St. Pölten-Spratzern / SKN St. Pölten	Total		163	100	32	31	42	12	237	143
Career total			421	437	64	54	57	23	542	514
