= Zala Kuštrin =

Slovenian footballer

Personal information
- Date of birth: 18 June 1998 (age 28)
- Position: Midfielder

Team information
- Current team: Radomlje

International career
Years	Team	Apps	(Gls)
	Slovenia	23	(3)

Zala Kuštrin (born 18 June 1998) is a Slovenian footballer who plays as a midfielder and has appeared for the Slovenia women's national team.

== Career ==
Kuštrin has been capped for the Slovenia national team, appearing for the team during the 2019 FIFA Women's World Cup qualifying cycle.

== International goals ==
Scores and results list Slovenia's goal tally first.

No.	Date	Venue	Opponent	Score	Result	Competition
1.	1 December 2023	Bonifika Stadium, Koper, Slovenia	Bosnia and Herzegovina	1–1	2–1	2023–24 UEFA Women's Nations League
2.	1 December 2023	Bonifika Stadium, Koper, Slovenia	Bosnia and Herzegovina	2–1	2–1	2023–24 UEFA Women's Nations League
3.	5 April 2024	Šiška Sports Park, Ljubljana, Slovenia	Moldova	2–0	2–0	UEFA Women's Euro 2025 qualifying
