= Slovenian Women's Cup =

- Founded: 1994
- Region: Slovenia
- Current champions: Mura (12th title)
- Most championships: Mura (12 titles)
- Website: Official website

The Slovenian Women's Cup (Slovene: Ženski nogometni pokal) is the national women's football cup competition in Slovenia. The first edition took place in the 1994–95 season.

== List of finals ==
Season	Winners	Result	Runners-up
1994–95	Jarše		Ilirija
2000–01	Škale	4–0 and 4–3	Ilirija
2001–02	Škale	3–1	Krka
2002–03	Domžale	3–3 a.e.t. (6–5 pen.)	Krka
2003–04	Krka	3–0	Senožeti
2004–05	Pomurje	5–0	Senožeti
2005–06	Krka	6–2	Pomurje
2006–07	Pomurje	8–2	Slovenj Gradec
2007–08	Krka	4–1	Pomurje
2008–09	Krka	4–2	Pomurje
2009–10	Krka	5–1	Slovenj Gradec
2010–11	Jevnica	4–2	Krka
2011–12	Pomurje	4–0	Rudar Škale
2012–13	Pomurje	3–1	Rudar Škale
2013–14	Pomurje	4–1	Rudar Škale
2014–15	Rudar Škale	2–2 (4–2 pen.)	Pomurje
2015–16	Pomurje	7–3	Radomlje
2016–17	Pomurje	6–0	Rudar Škale
2017–18	Pomurje	3–1	Radomlje
2018–19	Pomurje	5–0	Krim
2019–20	Cancelled due to the COVID-19 pandemic.		
2020–21	Olimpija Ljubljana	1–1 (5–3 pen.)	Pomurje
2021–22	Olimpija Ljubljana	1–0	Ljubljana
2022–23	Mura	3–1	Olimpija Ljubljana
2023–24	Mura	5–1	Ljubljana
2024–25	Ljubljana	1–0	Mura
2025–26	Mura	2–0	Radomlje

=== Performances by club ===
Club	Titles	Years won
Mura (Note: Known as Pomurje between 2003 and 2022)	12	2004–05, 2006–07, 2011–12, 2012–13, 2013–14, 2015–16, 2016–17, 2017–18, 2018–19, 2022–23, 2023–24, 2025–26
Krka	5	2003–04, 2005–06, 2007–08, 2008–09, 2009–10
Škale	3	2000–01, 2001–02, 2014–15
Olimpija Ljubljana	2	2020–21, 2021–22
Jarše	1	1994–95
Domžale	1	2002–03
Jevnica	1	2010–11
Ljubljana	1	2024–25

== See also ==
- Slovenian Football Cup, men's edition
