= Kristina Petrushevska =

Macedonian footballer

Personal information
- Date of birth: 23 September 2000 (age 26)
- Position: Forward

International career^{‡}
Years	Team	Apps	(Gls)
2016	Macedonia U-17	3	(0)
2020–	North Macedonia	7	(0)
- ‡ National team caps and goals as of 19:42, 4 April 2023 (UTC)

Kristina Petrushevska (born 23 September 2000) is a Macedonian footballer who plays as a forward for the North Macedonia national team.

== International career ==
Petrushevska made her debut for the North Macedonia national team on 17 September 2021, coming on as a substitute for Afrodita Salihi against England.
