= Sara Gradišek =

Slovenian footballer (born 2003)

Sara Gradišek (born 16 July 2003) is a Slovenian footballer who plays as a defender for Bologna.

== Early life ==
Gradišek attended the University of Ljubljana in Slovenia.

== Club career ==
Gradišek played for Slovenian side ŽNK Radomlje, where she captained the club.

== International career ==
In 2023, Gradišek debuted for the Slovenia women's national football team during a 3–1 win over the Kosovo women's national football team.

== Style of play ==
Gradišek has been described as a "skilful midfielder".

== Personal life ==
Gradišek is a native of Jevnica, Slovenia.
