= ŽNK Škale =

Škale
- Full name: Ženski nogometni klub Škale
- Founded: 1983; 42 years ago
- Ground: Ob Jezeru (artificial turf)
| Home colours | Away colours |

Ženski nogometni klub Škale, commonly referred to as ŽNK Škale, was a Slovenian women's football club from Škale.

Also known as Rudar Škale, they have won the Slovenian Cup in 2001, 2002 and 2015, and the Slovenian Championship in 2000 and 2002.

== Honours ==
- Slovenian League
  - Winners (2): 1999–2000, 2001–02
- Slovenian Cup
  - Winners (3): 2000–01, 2001–02, 2014–15
