= Špela Kolbl =

Slovenian footballer (born 1998)

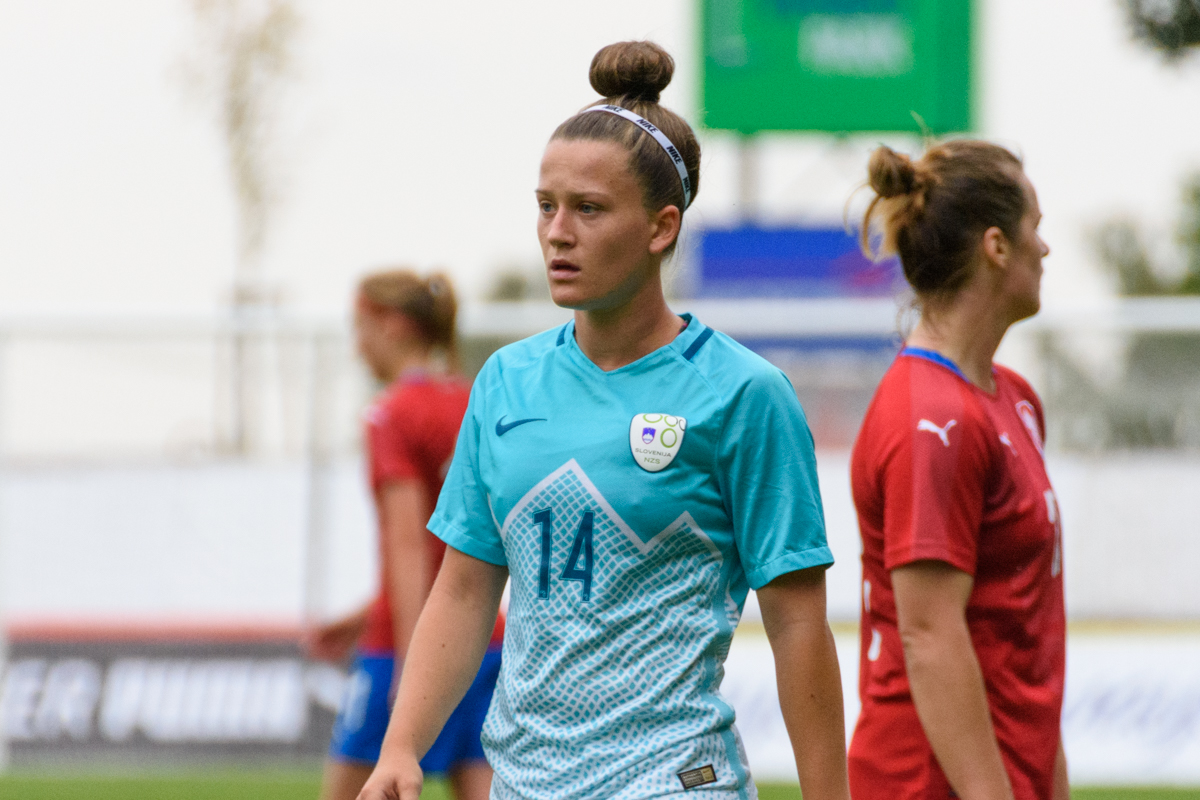
- Kolbl in 2018

Personal information
- Date of birth: 13 March 1998 (age 28)
- Position: Forward

Team information
- Current team: Mura
- Number: 7

Youth career
- –2016: Pomurje

Senior career*
Years	Team	Apps	(Gls)
2013–	Pomurje / Mura	244	(314)

International career^{‡}
2013–2014	Slovenia U17	6	(2)
2015–2017	Slovenia U19	12	(6)
2014–	Slovenia	79	(10)
- * Club domestic league appearances and goals as of 21 September 2026 ‡ National team caps and goals as of 29 June 2025

Špela Kolbl (born 13 March 1998) is a Slovenian footballer who plays as a forward for ŽNK Mura and the Slovenia women's national team.

== Career ==
Kolbl has been capped for the Slovenia national team, appearing for the team during the 2019 FIFA Women's World Cup qualifying cycle.

== See also ==
- List of women footballers with 300 or more goals
