= ŽNK Radomlje =

Radomlje
- Full name: Ženski nogometni klub Radomlje
- Nickname: Rumenosrčne (The Yellow-hearted)
- Founded: 2012; 14 years ago
- Ground: Radomlje Sports Park
- President: Darja Marinšek
- Head coach: Matej Rožič Mavrič
- League: 1. SŽNL
- 2025–26: 1. SŽNL, 2nd of 11
- Website: www.znk-radomlje.si
Home colours	Away colours	Third colours

Ženski nogometni klub Radomlje (English: Women's Football Club Radomlje), commonly referred to as ŽNK Radomlje or simply Radomlje, is a Slovenian women's football club from the city of Radomlje, currently playing in the 1. SŽNL, the top division of Slovenian women's football.

== Current squad ==
As of 4 April 2026

Note: Flags indicate national team as defined under FIFA eligibility rules; some limited exceptions apply. Players may hold more than one non-FIFA nationality.

No.	Pos.	Nation	Player
3	DF	SLO	Jona Javorič
4	DF	SLO	Ajda Zajc
5	MF	SLO	Sara Gradišek
6	DF	SLO	Nika Bazjak
7	FW	SLO	Neja Selan
8	DF	SLO	Aneli Kutin Prešeren
9	FW	SLO	Ula Omerzu
10	FW	SLO	Ula Osolnik
11	DF	SLO	Ana Gerjolj (captain)
12	GK	SLO	Pia Božič
13	DF	SLO	Taja Jakopič
14	MF	SLO	Ayla Skenderović

No.	Pos.	Nation	Player
16	MF	SLO	Lana Lesjak
17	MF	SLO	Barbara Pšeničnik
18	MF	SLO	Neža Žagar
19	MF	SLO	Sara Medić
20	FW	SEN	Khadija Badio
21	FW	SLO	Zoja Šrot
22	DF	SEN	Bineta Seck
23	MF	USA	Jordan Schaefer
26	FW	SLO	Pika Lamovšek
66	GK	SLO	Iva Kocijan
77	MF	SLO	Tajda Mujezinović

== See also ==
- NK Radomlje, men's team
