= ŽNK Olimpija Ljubljana =

Slovenian women's association football club

Olimpija Ljubljana
- Full name: Ženski nogometni klub Olimpija Ljubljana
- Nicknames: Zmajčice (Dragon Ladies); Zeleno-bele (The Green and Whites)
- Founded: 2015; 11 years ago
- President: Boris Snedec
- Head coach: Vladimir Kokol
- League: 1. SŽNL
- 2025–26: 1. SŽNL, 5th of 11
Home colours	Away colours

Ženski nogometni klub Olimpija Ljubljana (English: Women's Football Club Olimpija Ljubljana), commonly referred to as ŽNK Olimpija Ljubljana or simply Olimpija, is a Slovenian women's football club based in Ljubljana, established in 2015.

They were crowned champions of the 2016–17 Slovenian Women's League, and made their European debut in the 2017–18 UEFA Women's Champions League.

== Honours ==
- Slovenian League

Winners: 2016–17, 2017–18
Runners-up: 2018–19, 2020–21, 2021–22, 2022–23, 2023–24

- Slovenian Cup

Winners: 2020–21, 2021–22
Runners-up: 2022–23
