= ŽNK Mura =

Mura
- Full name: Ženski nogometni klub Mura
- Nicknames: Čarno-bejle (The Black and Whites)
- Founded: 1999; 27 years ago (as ŽNK Odranci)
- Ground: Fazanerija City Stadium
- Capacity: 4,506
- President: Robert Kuzmič
- Head coach: Peter Kristan
- League: 1. SŽNL
- 2025–26: 1. SŽNL, 1st of 11 (champions)
- Website: nsmura.si/znk/
Home colours	Away colours

Ženski nogometni klub Mura (English: Women's Football Club Mura) or simply ŽNK Mura is a Slovenian women's football club based in Murska Sobota that competes in the 1. SŽNL, the top division of Slovenian women's football. They are the most successful women's football club in Slovenia with thirteen 1. SŽNL championships and twelve Slovenian Cup titles.

The club was founded in 1999 as ŽNK Odranci, and was known as ŽNK Pomurje between 2003 and 2022. In January 2023, the club merged with the men's football club NŠ Mura and renamed as ŽNK Mura.

== History ==
Founded in 1999 as ŽNK Odranci, the club won its first Slovenian Cup title in 2005 and the Slovenian League championship the following year, competing under the name ŽNK Pomurje. The next season, Pomurje won its second cup and was the league's runner-up. In 2008 and 2009, Pomurje was second to ŽNK Krka both in the league and the cup, but declined in the next two seasons (third in 2010 and fifth in 2011).

However, in 2012, Pomurje won both the league title and the cup, attaining their first double. The club became a dominating force between 2012 and 2016, winning four doubles and five straight championships. In the 2018–19 season, Pomurje won a seventh championship title without dropping any points, winning all 21 games of the season.

In the 2014–15 UEFA Women's Champions League season, Pomurje advanced to the round of 32 for the first time by finishing as the best runner-up in the qualifying tournament.

In December 2022, ŽNK Pomurje announced its merger with the men's football club NŠ Mura. The process was completed in January 2023, when the club adopted the new name ŽNK Mura, and also changed its colours to black and white.

== Current squad ==
As of 20 August 2026

Note: Flags indicate national team as defined under FIFA eligibility rules; some limited exceptions apply. Players may hold more than one non-FIFA nationality.

No.	Pos.	Nation	Player
1	GK	SLO	Saša Trunk
2	MF	SLO	Lana Kavaš
5	FW	SLO	Gaja Bizjak
6	DF	SLO	Gala Dasović Ravnik
7	FW	SLO	Špela Kolbl (captain)
8	MF	SLO	Alja Škaper
9	FW	SLO	Adrijana Mori
10	MF	SLO	Lea Dolinar
11	MF	SLO	Špela Gerbec
13	GK	SLO	Teja Truntič
14	MF	SLO	Nella Gjergjek
15	DF	SLO	Asja Cvetkovič

No.	Pos.	Nation	Player
17	MF	SLO	Živa Rakovec
19	DF	SLO	Zala Vindišar
20	FW	SLO	Lana Šernek
21	MF	SLO	Luša Berendijaš
22	MF	NED	Dominique Bruinenberg
23	DF	MKD	Elena Paneska
24	MF	SLO	Mateja Zver
25	MF	SLO	Noelle Vilčnik
28	MF	SLO	Neža Hrga
30	DF	MNE	Tanja Malesija
77	FW	UKR	Yana Malakhova
99	MF	MNE	Ivana Boričić

== Honours ==
- Slovenian League
  - Winners (13): 2005–06, 2011–12, 2012–13, 2013–14, 2014–15, 2015–16, 2018–19, 2020–21, 2021–22, 2022–23, 2023–24, 2024–25, 2025–26
- Slovenian Cup
  - Winners (12): 2004–05, 2006–07, 2011–12, 2012–13, 2013–14, 2015–16, 2016–17, 2017–18, 2018–19, 2022–23, 2023–24, 2025–26
- The Double (League and Cup)
  - Winners (8): 2011–12, 2012–13, 2013–14, 2015–16, 2018–19, 2022–23, 2023–24, 2025–26

== Record in UEFA competitions ==
Mura goals always listed first.

Key

- H = Home match
- A = Away match
- p = Penalty shoot-out
- a.e.t. = After extra time

Season	Competition	Stage	Opposition	Result
2006–07	UEFA Women's Cup	First qualifying round (Group 6)	(Belgium) Rapide Wezemaal	0–5
2006–07	UEFA Women's Cup	First qualifying round (Group 6)	(Serbia) Mašinac Classic Niš	2–3
2006–07	UEFA Women's Cup	First qualifying round (Group 6)	(Estonia) Pärnu JK	7–1
2012–13	UEFA Women's Champions League	Qualifying round (Group 1)	(Switzerland) Zürich	0–2
2012–13	UEFA Women's Champions League	Qualifying round (Group 1)	(Lithuania) Gintra Universitetas	9–1
2012–13	UEFA Women's Champions League	Qualifying round (Group 1)	(Turkey) Atasehir Belediyesi	4–2
2013–14	UEFA Women's Champions League	Qualifying round (Group 5)	(Poland) Unia Racibórz	1–3
2013–14	UEFA Women's Champions League	Qualifying round (Group 5)	(Belarus) Bobruichanka Bobruisk	3–1
2013–14	UEFA Women's Champions League	Qualifying round (Group 5)	(Albania) Ada Velipojë	13–0
2014–15	UEFA Women's Champions League	Qualifying round (Group 3)	(Montenegro) Ekonomist	4–0
2014–15	UEFA Women's Champions League	Qualifying round (Group 3)	(Estonia) Pärnu JK	4–0
2014–15	UEFA Women's Champions League	Qualifying round (Group 3)	(Hungary) MTK	1–2
2014–15	UEFA Women's Champions League	Round of 32	(Italy) Torres	2–4 (H), 1–3 (A)
2015–16	UEFA Women's Champions League	Qualifying round (Group 5)	(Montenegro) Ekonomist	4–0
2015–16	UEFA Women's Champions League	Qualifying round (Group 5)	(Estonia) Pärnu JK	2–1
2015–16	UEFA Women's Champions League	Qualifying round (Group 5)	(Romania) Olimpia Cluj	0–2
2016–17	UEFA Women's Champions League	Qualifying round (Group 5)	(Albania) Vllaznia	6–1
2016–17	UEFA Women's Champions League	Qualifying round (Group 5)	(Slovakia) Slovan Bratislava	4–2
2016–17	UEFA Women's Champions League	Qualifying round (Group 5)	(Switzerland) Zürich	0–5
2019–20	UEFA Women's Champions League	Qualifying round (Group 3)	(Wales) Cardiff Met.	0–1
2019–20	UEFA Women's Champions League	Qualifying round (Group 3)	(Georgia (country)) Tbilisi Nike	4–0
2019–20	UEFA Women's Champions League	Qualifying round (Group 3)	(Scotland) Hibernian	1–2
2020–21	UEFA Women's Champions League	First qualifying round	(Montenegro) Breznica Plejvlja	3–0
2020–21	UEFA Women's Champions League	Second qualifying round	(Hungary) Ferencváros	4–1
2020–21	UEFA Women's Champions League	Round of 32	(Denmark) Fortuna Hjørring	0–3 (H), 2–3 (A)
2021–22	UEFA Women's Champions League	Round 1 (semi-final)	(Latvia) Rīgas FS	6–1
2021–22	UEFA Women's Champions League	Round 1 (final)	(Ukraine) Zhytlobud-1 Kharkiv	1–4
2022–23	UEFA Women's Champions League	Round 1 (semi-final)	(Republic of Ireland) Shelbourne	0–1
2022–23	UEFA Women's Champions League	Round 1 (third place)	(Armenia) Hayasa	2–1
2023–24	UEFA Women's Champions League	Round 1 (semi-final)	(Georgia (country)) Samegrelo	0–0 (4–5 p)
2023–24	UEFA Women's Champions League	Round 1 (third place)	(North Macedonia) Ljuboten	7–1
2024–25	UEFA Women's Champions League	Round 1 (semi-final)	(Northern Ireland) Glentoran	3–2
2024–25	UEFA Women's Champions League	Round 1 (final)	(Cyprus) Apollon Ladies	3–2
2024–25	UEFA Women's Champions League	Round 2	(Austria) SKN St. Pölten	0–3 (A), 0–5 (H)
2025–26	UEFA Women's Champions League	Second qualifying round (semi-final)	(Slovakia) Spartak Myjava	3–2
2025–26	UEFA Women's Champions League	Second qualifying round (final)	(Poland) GKS Katowice	0–2
2025–26	UEFA Women's Europa Cup	Second qualifying round	(Belarus) Dinamo Minsk	2–0 (H), 1–2 (A)
2025–26	UEFA Women's Europa Cup	Round of 16	(Denmark) Nordsjælland	0–1 (A), 0–4 (H)
2026–27	UEFA Women's Champions League	Second qualifying round (semi-final)	(Romania) Farul Constanța	1–3 (a.e.t.)
2026–27	UEFA Women's Champions League	Second qualifying round (third place)	(Croatia) Hajduk Split	0–2
