= List of foreign Serie A (women's football) players =

This is a list of foreign players (i.e. non-Italian players) in Serie A. The following players:

1. Have played at least one Serie A game for the respective club (seasons in which and teams that a player did not collect any caps in Serie A for have NOT been listed).
2. Have not been capped for the Italian national team on any level, independently from the birthplace, except for players born in San Marino and active in the Italian national team before the first official match of the Sammarinese national team played on 14 November 1990 and players of Italian formation born abroad from Italian parents (so called 'Oriundi').
3. Have been born in Italy and were capped by a foreign national team. This includes players who have dual citizenship with Italy.

Players are sorted by the State, according to the FIFA eligibility rules:

1. They played for in a national team on any level. For footballers that played for two or more national teams it prevails:
  1. The one he played for on A level.
  2. The national team of birth.
2. If they never played for any national team on any level, it prevails the state of birth. For footballers born in dissolved states prevails the actual state of birth (e.g.: Yugoslavia -> Serbia, Montenegro, Croatia, etc.).

== Oriundi and Naturalised players ==
- (Guinea-Bissau) – Nenè Bissoli – Tavagnacco – 2007–2015
- (San Marino) – Chiara Beccari – Como, Juventus, Calcio – 2018–
- (Scotland) – Rose Reilly – AC Milan, Trani, Prato, Bari – 1973–1995

== Africa (CAF) ==
=== Algeria ===
- Ghoutia Karchouni – Inter Milan – 2021–
- Inès Belloumou – Lazio – 2024–

=== Cameroon ===
- Naomi Eto - Sassuolo - 2025
- Rivarole Tchethoua – Fiammamonza – 2012
- Augustine Ejangue – Pomigliano – 2021–2022
- Ajara Nchout – Inter Milan – 2021
- Marie Aurelie Awona – Napoli – 2021–2022

=== DR Congo ===
- Olga Massombo - Napoli - 2026-

=== Egypt ===
- Samia Adam – Napoli – 2022–2023
- Mohamed Sherin – Verona – 2010–2011

=== Ghana ===
- Karen Appiah – AC Milan – 2024–
- Abi Kim – Fiorentina – 2020
- Alima Moro – Tavagnacco – 2018–2019
- Bénédicte Simon – Sassuolo, Juventus – 2023

=== Nigeria ===
- Ogonna Chukwudi – Torres, Lazio – 2021
- Shukurat Oladipo – Roma – 2024
- Osinachi Ohale – Roma – 2020
- Jennifer Echegini – Juventus – 2024
- Toni Payne - Inter Milan - 2026

=== Malawi ===
- Tabitha Chawinga – Inter Milan – 2022

=== Morocco ===
- Yasmine Zouhir – Roma – 2023–2024
- Sabah Seghir – Sampdoria – 2021–

=== Senegal ===
- Dieynaba Ndaw - Napoli - 2026

=== South Africa ===
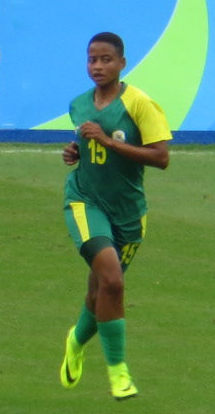
Refiloe Jane

- Refiloe Jane – AC Milan, Sassuolo – 2019–

=== Uganda ===
- Violah Nambi – Pomigliano – 2023–

== Asia (AFC) ==
=== Afghanistan ===
- Hailai Arghandiwal – Florentia – 2018–19

=== Australia ===
- Annalise Rasmussen - Juventus - 2026
- Isobel Dalton – Napoli – 2020–2021
- Lisa De Vanna – Fiorentina – 2019–2020
- Jacynta Galabadaarachchi – Napoli – 2020–2021
- Aivi Luik – Pomigliano – 2021–2022
- Ella Mastrantonio – Lazio – 2021, Pomigliano – 2022
- Alexandra Huynh – Napoli – 2020–2021
- Angela Iannotta – ACF Agliana, Autolelli Picenum – 1992–1993
- Isabella Foletta – Lazio – 2021–2022
- Alex Chidiac - Como - 2025-
- Jessika Nash - Sassuolo - 2025-
- Winonah Heatley - Roma - 2025-

=== China ===
- Yang Lina – Lazio – 2024–
- Giada Zhou – Tavagnacco – 2019–2020

=== Japan ===
- Yui Hasegawa – AC Milan – 2021
- Mana Mihashi – Inter Milan – 2022
- Moeka Minami – Roma – 2022
- Saki Kumagai – Roma – 2023

=== South Korea ===
- Kim Shin-Ji – Roma – 2025-

=== Philippines ===
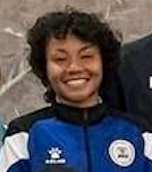
Sarina Bolden

- Sarina Bolden – Como – 2024–

== Europe (UEFA) ==
=== Albania ===
- Alma Hilaj – Florentia, Como – 2019
- Greis Domi – Pomigliano, Fiorentina – 2014

=== Austria ===
- Verena Aschauer (née Hanshaw) – Roma – 2024–2025
- Marina Georgieva – Fiorentina – 2023
- Birgitt Hufnagl – Bardolino – 2004
- Isabella Kresche – Roma, Sassuolo – 2022–
- Jelena Prvulovic – Bari – 2022
- Carina Wenninger – Roma – 2022–
- Nike Winter – Tavagnacco – 2018
- Larissa Rusek - Juventus - 2026

=== Belarus ===
- Karina Olkhovik – Sassuolo – 2022–2023

=== Belgium ===
- Davinia Vanmechelen - Napoli - 2025
- Diede Lemey – Verona, Atalanta Mozzanica, Sassuolo – 2017–2022
- Heleen Jaques – Fiorentina – 2018–2019
- Davina Philtjens – Fiorentina – 2018–2020
- Kassandra Missipo – Sassuolo – 2024–
- Ella Van Kerkhoven – Inter Milan – 2019–2020
- Tessa Wullaert – Inter Milan – 2024–
- Marie Detruyer – Inter Milan – 2024–
- Riana Nainggolan – Roma – 2014–2015
- Elena Dhont – Sassuolo – 2024–
- Sarah Wijnants - Fiorentina - 2025-
- Lena Hubaut - Como - 2026

=== Bosnia and Herzegovina ===
- Lidija Kulis – AC Milan – 2019
- Milica Milinkovic – Inter Milan – 2023–
- Gloria Sliskovic – Juventus, Napoli – 2023
- Maja Jelcic – Inter Milan, Napoli – 2023
- Emma Veletanlic - Napoli - 2026-
- Emina Ekic - Parma - 2026

=== Bulgaria ===
- Evdokiya Popadinova – Lazio, Sassuolo – 2020
- Ivana Naydenova – Hellas Verona – 2024–
- Liliana Kostova – Fiorentina, Verona – 2017–2019
- Dessi Dupuy – Florentia, Verona – 2018
- Simona Petrkova – Bari, Empoli – 2018–
- Yoana Stankova - Como - 2026

=== Croatia ===
- Doris Bačić – Napoli, Juventus – 2018–2023
- Ana Jelenčić – Verona, Parma – 2020
- Sandra Žigić – AC Milan – 2018
- Mihaela Horvat – Verona – 2021–
- Petra Mikulica – AC Milan – 2023
- Ana Petrovic – Riviera di Romagna – 2014–

=== Czech Republic ===
- Eva Bartonova – Inter Milan – 2019
- Kamila Dubcová – Sassuolo, AC Milan – 2019
- Michaela Dubcová – Sassuolo, AC Milan – 2019
- Jana Nováková – Fiammamonza – 1983–1985
- Jaroslava Rinnerová-Poláčková – ACF Milan – 1985–1990
- Andrea Stašková – AC Milan – 2023
- Olivie Lukasova – Roma – 2024–
- Gabriela Martoskova – Bari – 2020–2021
- Kristyna Sivakova – Orobica – 2019
- Blanka Penickova – Tavagnacco – 2005–2006

=== Denmark ===
- Freja Thisgaard - Napoli - 2026-
- Laura Faurskov - Napoli - 2026-
- Amalie Vangsgaard – Juventus – 2024–
- Agnete Marcussen – Como – 2024–
- Merete Pedersen – Torres – 2003
- Stine Ballisager – Fiorentina – 2024
- Susanne Augustesen – Padua, Lazio, Trani, Modena – 1974–1995
- Ulla Bastrup – Trani – 1984
- Marianne Kamp - Bologna - 1978–1984
- Frederikke Thøgersen – Fiorentina, Roma – Inter Milan – 2019
- Caroline Møller – Inter Milan – 2020–
- Lone Smidt Nielsen (née Hansen) – ACF Trani – 1985–1986
- Sofie Junge Pedersen – Juventus, Inter Milan – 2018–
- Caroline Pleidrup – Sassuolo – 2022
- Sara Thrige – AC Milan – 2021
- Matilde Lundorf Skovsen – Juventus, Como, Napoli – 2020
- Signe Holt Andersen -Lazio – 2021
- Maria Møller Thomsen -Lazio – 2021
- Caroline Rask – AC Milan – 2020
- Emma Færge – Fiorentina – 2023–
- Sanne Troelsgaard Nielsen – Roma – 2025–
- Nadia Nadim – AC Milan – 2024–2025
- Marie Ševčíková – ACF Fiorentina – 1971–1972
- Camilla Kur Larsen – Verona – 2015
- Bonny Madsen – AC Milan – 1998
- Sofie Bredgaard – Fiorentina – 2024
- Emma Snerle – Fiorentina – 2024
- Amelie Thestrup – Roma – 2020
- Janni Jensen – Fiorentina – 2019
- Maja Hagemann – Sassuolo – 2023-
- Cecilie Fløe – Napoli – 2025-
- Mille Jusjong Henriksen – Napoli – 2025-
- Mathilde Kruse – Como – 2025-
- Sofie Svava - Como - 2026
- Mie Jung - Napoli - 2026

=== England ===
- Sian Williams – Siderno – 1988–1990
- Millie Chandarana – San Marino, Tavagnacco – 2019–2021
- Eniola Aluko – Juventus – 2018
- Yvonne Baldeo – AC Milan – 1984
- Debbie Bampton – Trani – 1987–1988
- Ellie Brazil – Fiorentina – 2017
- Dot Cassell – Roma – 1971
- Danielle Cox – Pomigliano, Parma – 2021–
- Kerry Davis – Lazio, Napoli, Trani – 1985
- Natasha Dowie – AC Milan – 2020–2021
- Shameeka Fishley – Sassuolo – 2018
- Sallie Jackson – AC Milan – 1984
- Danielle Lea – ASD Pink Sport Time – 2021
- Sue Lopez – Roma – 1971
- Lianne Sanderson – Juventus – 2018
- Chelsea Weston – Bari – 2020
- Paige Williams – Brescia, Verona – 2015
- Katie Zelem – Juventus – 2017
- Karin Muya – San Marino – 2020–2021

=== Estonia ===
- Vlada Kubassova – Napoli, Como – 2018–
- Lisette Tammik – Napoli – 2020–2021

=== Finland ===
- Sofia Manner - Napoli - 2026
- Paula Myllyoja – Bari – 2019–2021
- Anna Auvinen – Sam₫pdoria, Inter Milan – 2019
- Sanni Franssi – Juventus – 2017
- Riikka Hannula – Sassuolo, Verona – 2017
- Tuija Hyyrynen – Juventus – 2017
- Nora Heroum – Brescia, AC Milan, Lazio, Parma, Sampdoria – 2017
- Kerttu Karresmaa – Sampdoria, Lazio – 2023
- Emma Koivisto – AC Milan – 2024
- Heidi Kollanen – Tavagnacco – 2018–2019
- Rosa Lappi-Seppala – Torino, Fiammamonza – 1999–
- Jasmin Mansaray – Inter Milan – 2024
- Linda Nyman – Inter Milan – 2020
- Oona Sevenius – Como, AC Milan – 2023–2024
- Maiju Ruotsalainen – Torres – 2010
- Adelina Engman – Como – 2025-
- Tinja-Riikka Korpela – Roma – 2023
- Virva Junkkari – Lazio – 2002
- Emma Santamaki – Tavagnacco – 2019
- Elli-Noora Kainulanien - Napoli Women - 2026-
- Sofia Jahnukanien - Roma - 2026

=== France ===
- Solene Durand - Sassaulo - 2026
- Lea Kherfli - Juventus - 2026
- Laura Agard – Fiorentina, AC Milan – 2018
- Nesrine Bahlouli – AC Milan – 2023
- Alice Benoît – Parma, Sassuolo, Sampdoria – 2021
- Noémie Carage – AC Milan – 2022
- Estelle Cascarino – Juventus – 2023
- Julie Debever – Inter Milan – 2019
- Hillary Diaz – Inter Milan – 2024
- Kelly Gago – Sampdoria, Parma – 2022
- Maëlle Garbino – Juventus – 2023
- Sarah Huchet – Napoli, Fiorentina, Sampdoria – 2020
- Emelyne Laurent – AC Milan – 2023
- Ella Palis – Juventus – 2023
- Pauline Peyraud-Magnin – Juventus – 2021
- Iris Rabot – Parma, Pomigliano – 2022
- Hawa Sangaré – Pomigliano – 2022
- Lindsey Thomas – Juventus, Roma, AC Milan – 2019
- Annahita Zamanian – Juventus, Fiorentina, Sassuolo, Sampdoria, Parma – 2020
- Coline Bouby – Verona – 2017–2018
- Hawa Cissoko – Roma – 2024
- Safia Tell – Roma – 2021
- Oceane Daniel – Fiorentina – 2017
- Laura Condon – Lazio – 2023–

=== Germany ===
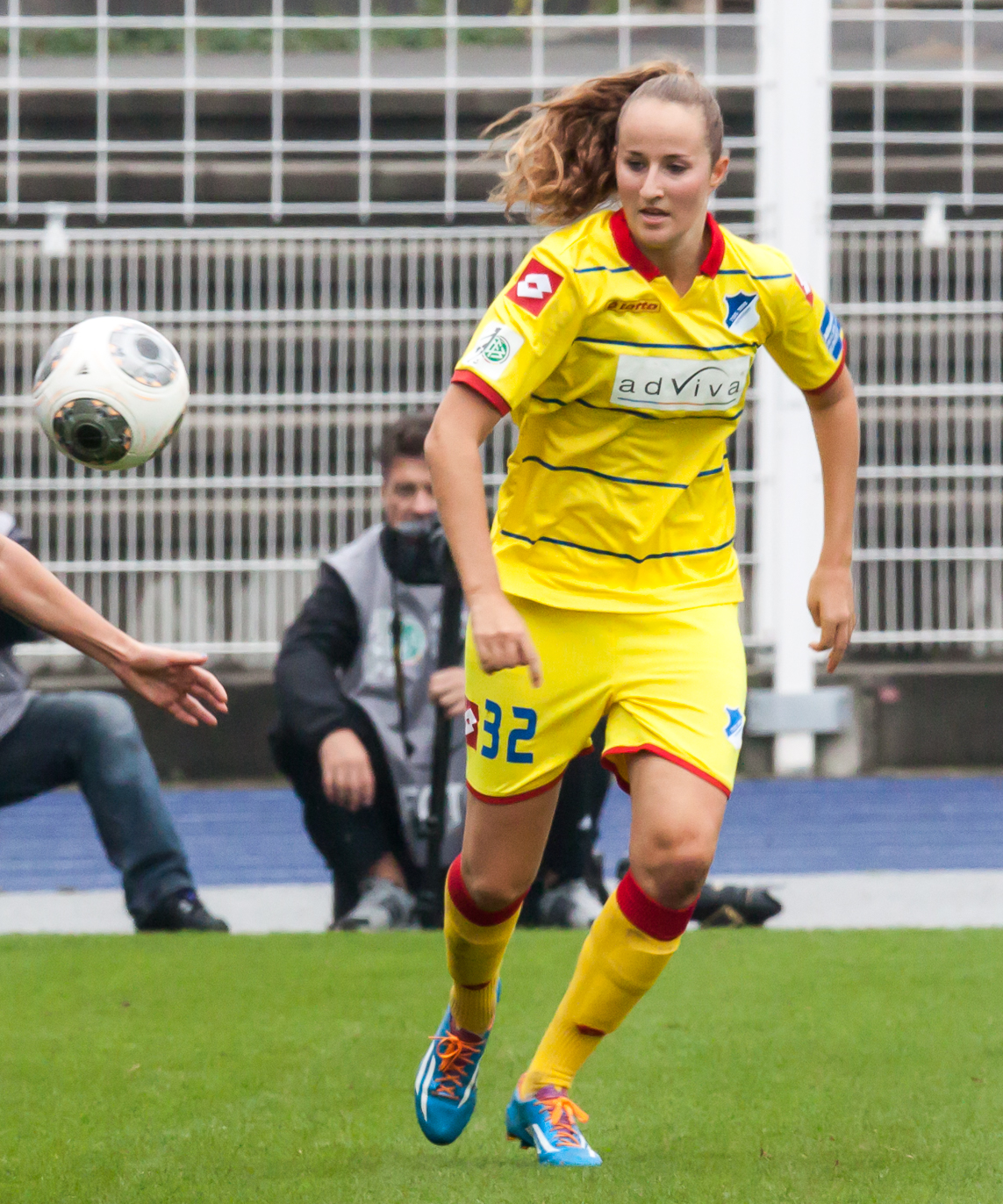
Tamar Dongus

- Paulina Krumbiegel – Juventus – 2024–
- Tamar Dongus – Florentia, Sassuolo – 2018
- Vivien Beil – Como, Parma, Napoli – 2020
- Stephanie Breitner – Napoli, Fiorentina – 2018
- Gina Chmielinski – Napoli, Sassuolo – 2023–
- Lina Magull – Inter Milan – 2024
- Anke Preuß – Verona – 2016
- Maia Kamper Rodrigues – Sampdoria – 2024
- Julia Simic – AC Milan – 2020
- Merle Kirschstein – AC Milan – 2021
- Ramona Petzelberger – Como – 2024
- Sarah Hornschuch - Napoli - 2025
- Maia Kemper Rodrigues - Parma - 2025

=== Greece ===
- Despoina Chatzinikolaou – Napoli, Lazio – 2019
- Sophia Koggouli – Parma, Tavagnacco, Fiorentina, Verona – 2016–2024

=== Hungary ===
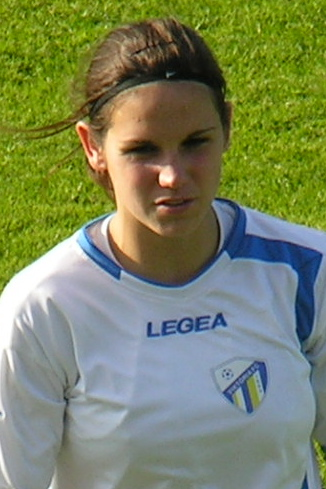
Lilla Sipos

- Lilla Sipos – Verona – 2014–2015
- Henrietta Csiszár – Inter Milan – 2021–
- Beatrix Fördős – Lazio, Inter Milan – 2021–2025
- Virág Nagy – Sampdoria, Sassuolo – 2022–2024
- Zsanett Kajan – Como, Lazio, Fiorentina – 2022
- Laura Palakovics - Sassuolo - 2026
- Luca Papp - Calcio - 2026

=== Iceland ===
- Lara Pedersen – Napoli – 2021
- Andrea Mist Palsdottir – Orobica – 2019
- Cecelia Ran Runarsdottir – Inter Milan – 2024
- Guðný Árnadóttir – AC Milan, Napoli – 2020
- Sara Björk Gunnarsdóttir – Juventus – 2022–
- Alexandra Jóhannsdóttir – Fiorentina – 2022
- Anna Björk Kristjánsdóttir – Inter Milan – 2021
- Hallbera Gudny Gisladottir – Torres – 2014
- Sigrun Einarsdottir – Fiorentina – 2017
- Kristrun Antonsdottir – Roma – 2018–2019
- Katla Tryggvadottir - Fiorentina - 2025-
- Aslaug Munda Gunnlaugsdottir - Parma - 2026-
- Hlin Eiriksdottir - Fiorentina - 2026
- Telma Ivarsdottir - Milan - 2026

=== Israel ===
- Noa Selimhodzic – AC Milan – 2021

=== Kosovo ===
- Talie Halitjaha – Sassuolo – 2010

=== Latvia ===
- Gabriela Andersone – Sassuolo – 2024–
- Renate Fedotova – Bari – 2021–

=== Lithuania ===
- Rimantė Jonušaitė – AC Milan – 2021
- Liucija Vaitukaitytė – Parma – 2022–

=== Malta ===
- Rachel Cuschieri – Lazio, Sampdoria, Genoa – 2020–
- Emma Lipman – Hellas Verona, Roma, Florentia, Como – 2017–20, 2022–
- Kailey Willis – Verona – 2020–
- Shona Zammit – Bari – 2019–2020
- Nicole Sciberras – Juventus – 2020–2021
- Haley Bugeja – Inter Milan – 2023–
- Maya Cachia – Como – 2023

=== Montenegro ===
- Masa Tomasevic - Inter Milan - 2025-

=== Netherlands ===
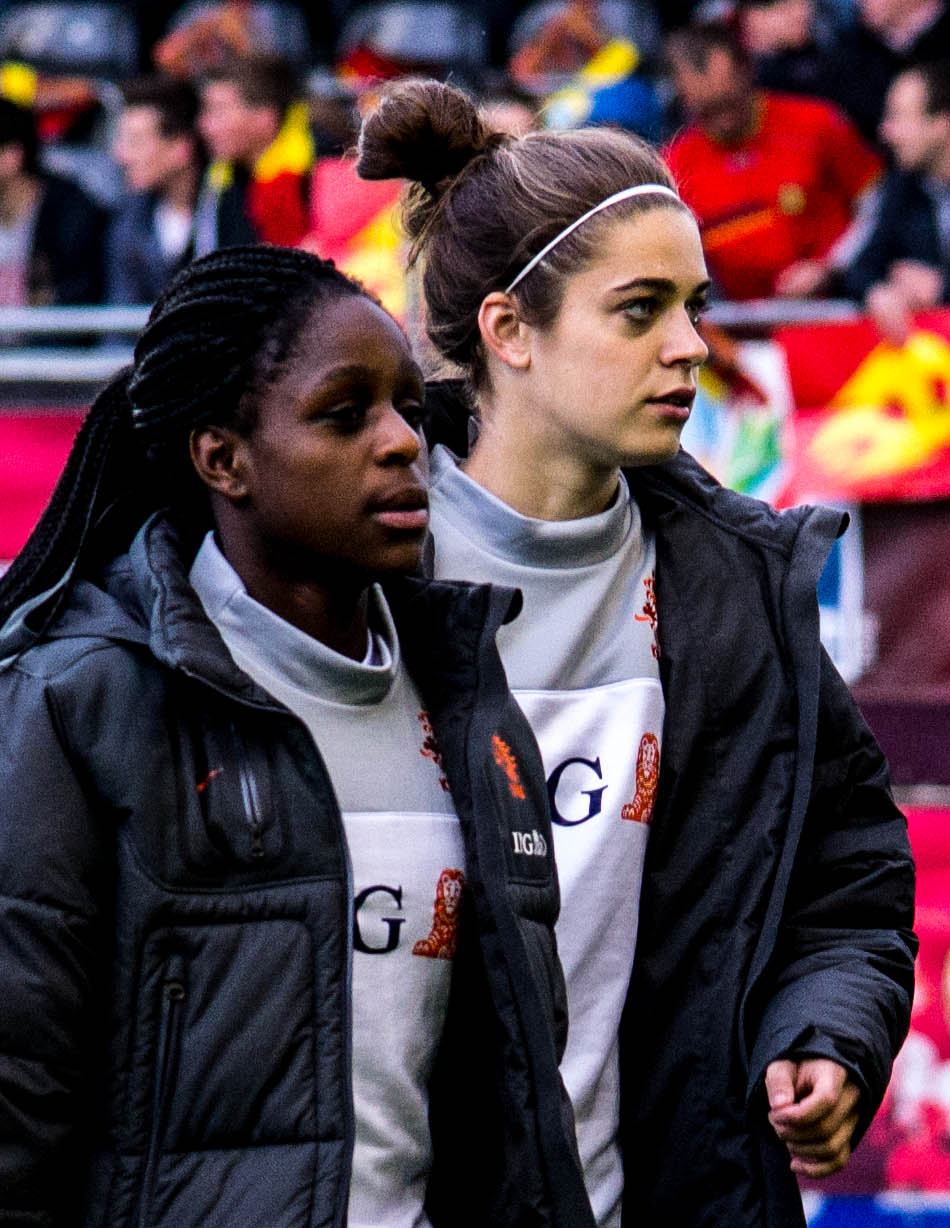
Tessel Middag

- Kim Dolstra – Verona – 2016–2017
- Nikee van Dijk - Inter Milan - 2025
- Selena Babb – AC Milan – 2021–
- Lineth Beerensteyn – Juventus – 2022
- Stefanie van der Gragt – Inter Milan – 2022
- Aniek Nouwen – AC Milan – 2023
- Vera Pauw – Modena – 1988–
- Dominique Bruinenberg – Verona – 2016
- Pia Rijsdijk – Napoli – 2020
- Sofieke Jansen – Napoli, Sassuolo – 2019–2021
- Anna Knol – Empoli – 2020–2021
- Corina Luijks – Bari – 2017
- Tessel Middag – Fiorentina – 2021–

=== Norway ===
- Thea Kyvag - AC Milan - 2025-
- Malin Brenn – Como – 2022–2023
- Iris Omarsdottir - Fiorentina - 2025
- Kirvil Odden Sundsfjord – Sampdoria – 2022–2023
- Cecilie Fiskerstrand – Fiorentina – 2024
- Mina Bergersen – Como, Roma – 2021–
- Noor Eckhoff – Inter Milan – 2023
- Emilie Haavi – Roma – 2021
- Sophie Roman Haug – Roma – 2022
- Anja Sønstevold – Inter Milan, AS Roma – 2021–
- Tuva Sagen – Como – 2024
- Benedicte Haland – Verona – 2022
- Ingvild Isaksen – Juventus – 2017
- Ingrid Schjelderup – Fiorentina – 2017
- Ingrid Spord – Fiorentina – 2017
- Stine Hovland – AC Milan – 2019
- Andrine Hegerberg – Roma – 2019
- Johanne Fridlund – Lazio – 2020
- Madelen Holme – Napoli – 2024
- Emma Stolen Godo – Juventus – 2025
- Mina Bergersen – Roma, Como – 2021–
- Julie Jorde - Parma - 2026
- Mawa Sesay - Milan - 2026
- Mathilde Harviken – Juventus – 2024–
- Camilla Linberg – Como – 2022–2023
- Guro Bergsvand - Fiorerina - 2026

=== Poland ===
- Patrycja Jerzak – Napoli – 2020
- Mady Solow – Verona – 2015–2018
- Nikola Karczewska – AC Milan – 2024
- Katarzyna Konat – Pomigliano – 2022
- Małgorzata Mesjasz – AC Milan – 2022
- Katarzyna Daleszczyk – Brescia, Sassuolo – 2017
- Aleksandra Rompa (née Sikora) – Juventus, Brescia – 2017
- Ewelina Kamczyk - Milan - 2026
- Weronika Szymasek - Parma - 2026
- Martyna Wiankowska - Como - 2026-

=== Portugal ===
- Carla Couto – Lazio – 2011
- Cláudia Neto – Fiorentina – 2020
- Andreia Norton – Inter Milan – 2019
- Joana Marchão – Parma – 2022
- Adriana Gomes – Napoli – 2023
- Patricia Gouveia – Chiasiellis – 2013
- Mafalda Marujo – Torres – 2015
- Cintia Santos – Roma – 2025
- Catarina Ferreira – Sassuolo, Pomilgiano – 2021
- Monica Mendes – AC Milan, Brescia – 2017
- Raquel Infante – San Zaccaria, Riviera di Romagna – 2013
- Emily Lima – Napoli – 2009
- Tatiana Pinto - Juventus - 2025-
- Cintia Martins - Roma, Termana - 2026

=== Republic of Ireland ===
- Gráinne Cross – Fiammamonza – 1986
- Lisa Curran – Firenze – 1991–1993
- Niamh Farrelly – Parma – 2022–
- Anne O'Brien – Lazio, Trani, Lazio, CF Modena, Napoli, Prato, Reggiana, Milan 82 – 1976–1994
- Gráinne O'Malley – Carrara – 1991–1992
- Lois Roche – Florentia – 2018–2020
- Stephanie Roche (née Zambra) – Florentia – 2018–2020
- Shauna Peare – Verona – 2017
- Niamh Farrelly – Parma – 2022
- Megan Connolly – Lazio – 2025
- Louise Quinn – Fiorentina – 2020
- Mel Filis - Sassuolo - 2026

=== Romania ===
- Cristina Carp – Sampdoria, Bari – 2019
- Camelia Ceasar – Torino, Brescia, AC Milan, Roma – 2012
- Adina Giurgiu – Sassuolo – 2017
- Florentina Spânu (née Olar-Spanu) – Lazio – 2008
- Sabina Radu – Napoli, Lazio – 2011–
- Bianca Raicu – Trani, Torres, Chievo, Lecce, Torino – 2017
- Laura Rus – Sassuolo, Verona – 2017–
- Katia Ghioc – Roma – 2021
- Monika Sinka – Riviera di Romagna – 2014
- Alexandra Tunoaia – Chieco – 2018

=== Russia ===
- Alina Myagkova – Verona – 2022

=== San Marino ===
- Eleonora Cecchini – San Marino – 2020–21

=== Scotland ===
- Maria Blagojević – Roma, Trani – 1979
- Lana Clelland – Tavagnacco, Bari, Fiorentina, Sassuolo – 2014
- Edna Neillis – AC Milan – 1975–1990
- Christy Grimshaw – AC Milan – 2020

=== Serbia ===
- Sara Cetinja – Pomigliano – 2021–
- Milica Mijatović – Roma, Fiorentina – 2022
- Sara Stokic – AC Milan – 2023

=== Slovakia ===
- Mária Korenčiová – Milan, Como – 2018–22, 2022–
- Karen Makova – Sassuolo – 2021–
- Lucia Harsanyova — Hellas Verona – 2018–2019
- Lucia Ondrusova – Hellas Verona – 2018–2019
- Dominika Skorvankova – Como – 2023–
- Michaela Martiskova - Juventus - 2025-

=== Slovenia ===
- Nina Kajzba - Parma - 2026
- Naja Mihelic – Sassuolo – 2024–
- Urska Zganec – Torres – 2012–2013
- Anja Milenkovic – Tavagnacco – 2008
- Dominika Čonč – Milan, Sampdoria – 2019–21, 2021–
- Kaja Eržen – Tavagnacco, Roma, Napoli, Fiorentina – 2017
- Lana Golob – Napoli, Pomigliano – 2022
- Nina Kajzba – Roma, Napoli, Parma – 2021
- Zara Kramžar – Roma, Como – 2024
- Kristina Erman – Torres, Riviera di Romangna – 2014
- Pamela Begic – AC Milan – 2019
- Maja Madon – Roma – 2025
- Lara Ivanusa – Tavagnacco – 2019
- Nika Babnik – Tavagnacco – 2019
- Kaja Jerina – ASD Pink Sport Time – 2014–
- Lucija Mori – Brescia – 2011–2013
- Tina Marolt – Orobica – 2019
- Tjasa Tibaut – Tavagancco – 2019
- Snezana Malesevic – Chiaisellis – 2007–2009

=== Spain ===
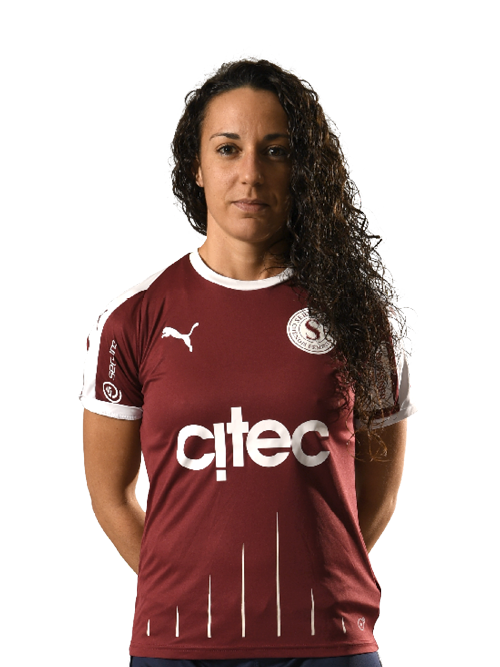
Paula Serrano

- Shelia Garcia - Inter Milan - 2026
- Julia Bartel - Juventus - 2026
- Aida Esteve - Parma - 2026
- Berta Bou – Como- 2024–
- Julia Olmos – Lazio – 2003–2004
- Marta – Sampdoria – 2024
- Rosita – Cuneo – 2014
- Paula Serrano – Torres – 2014
- Joana Flaviano – Torres – 2014–2015
- Verónica Boquete – AC Milan, Fiorentina – 2020–
- Paloma Lázaro – Bari, Parma, Fiorentina, Roma, Napoli – 2019
- Adriana Martín – Lazio – 2020–
- Ángeles Parejo – Torino, Torres, Roma, Reggiana – 1988–
- Isabel Parejo – Torres, Reggiana – 1988
- Macarena Portales – Inter Milan – 2021–
- Silvia Rubio – AC Milan – 2022–
- Conchi Sánchez – Lazio, Trani, Prato, Padua – 1973–
- Laia Codina – AC Milan – 2021–
- Victoria Losada – Roma – 2023
- Sara González – Napoli – 2021
- Marta Carro – Verona – 2016
- Oihane Valdezate – Roma – 2025
- Elisa del Estal – Como – 2024
- Yolanda Aguirre – Napoli – 2021
- Estela Carbonell – Juventus – 2025
- Barbara Latorre Viñals – AC Milan – 2024
- Carmen Menayo - Como - 2026

=== Sweden ===
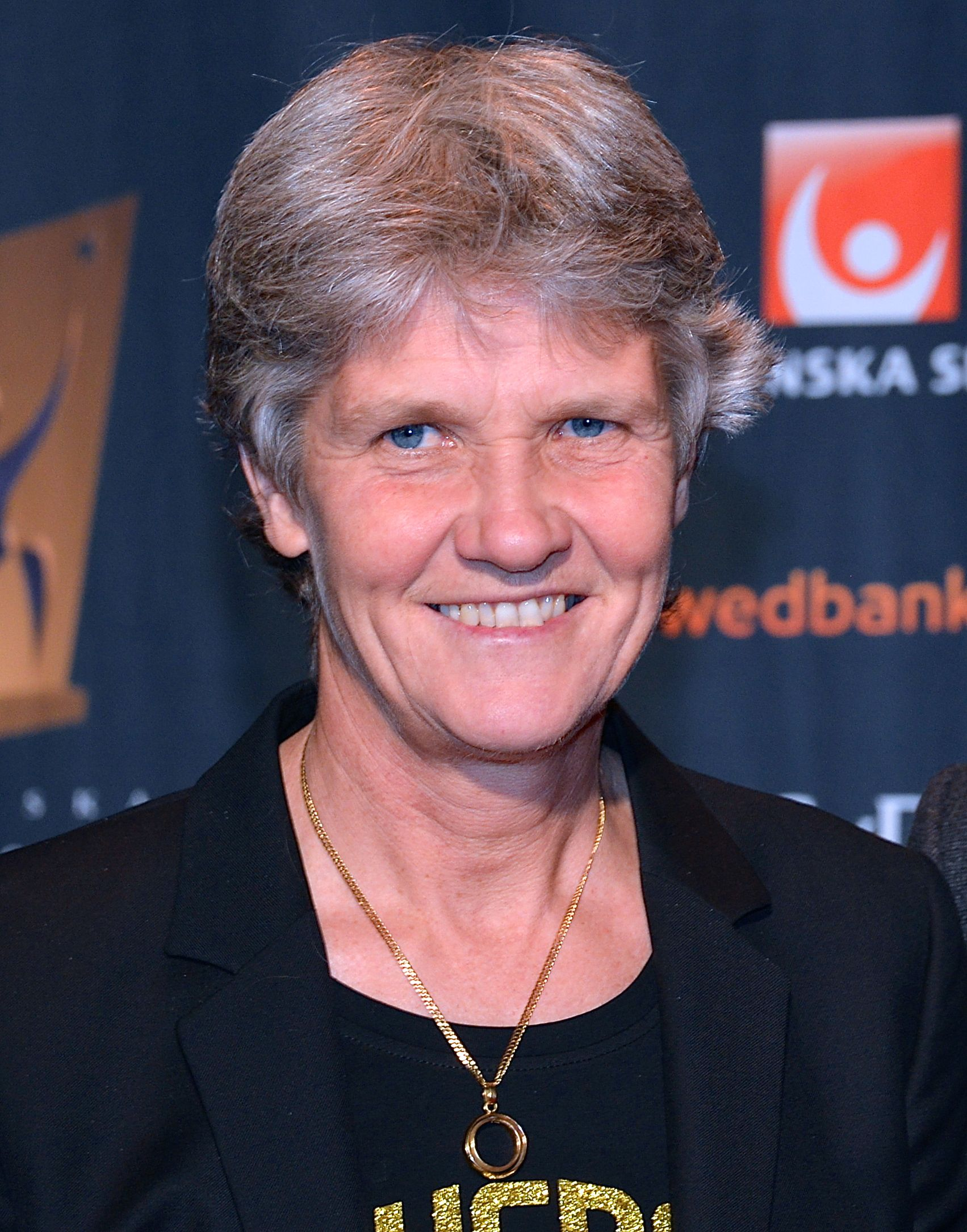
Pia Sundhage

- Bea Sprung - Sassuolo - 2026
- Filippa Curmark – Fiorentina – 2024
- Emma Kullberg – Juventus – 2024
- Julia Roddar - Rome - 2026
- Malin Swedberg – Napoli – 1991
- Madelen Janogy – Fiorentina – 2024
- Evelyn Ijeh – AC Milan – 2024
- Ronja Aronsson – Fiorentina – 2022
- Jonna Dahlberg – Florentia, Verona – 2020–
- Kosovare Asllani – AC Milan – 2022–
- Marija Banušić – Roma, Pomigliano, Parma, Napoli – 2021
- Evelina Duljan – Juventus – 2022
- Lisa Ek – Fiorentina – 2015
- Petronella Ekroth – Roma, Juventus – 2018
- Emelie Helmvall – Bari, Sampdoria – 2020
- Fanny Lång – Inter Milan – 2023
- Emma Lind – Roma – 2021
- Julia Karlernäs – Como – 2022
- Jenny Hjohlman – Empoli, Napoli, Fiorentia – 2018
- Beata Kollmats – AS Roma – 2021
- Elin Landström – Inter Milan, Roma – 2021
- Julia Molin – Verona, Sassuolo – 2018
- Maria Karlsson – Verona – 2011–
- Amanda Nildén – Juventus – 2021
- Paulina Nyström – Juventus – 2023
- Stephanie Öhrström – Verona, Roma, Lazio, Fiorentina – 2010–
- Alva Selerud – Roma – 2023
- Linda Sembrant – Juventus – 2019
- Pia Sundhage – Lazio – 1985
- Pauline Hammarlund – Fiorentina- 2023–2024
- Karin Lundin – Fiorentina – 2021
- Sara Nilsson – Florentia, Verona – 2019–
- Olivia Schough – Inter Milan – 2025–
- Sara Nordin – Fiorentina – 2016
- Maja Gothberg – Lazio – 2023
- Antonia Goransson – Fiorentina – 2017
- Lina Hurtig – Juventus – 2022
- Elsa Pelgander – Juventus – 2025
- Lena Lofstedt (née Olovsson) – Sisal ACF Piacenza – 1975–
- Angel Mukusa - Roma - 2026

=== Switzerland ===
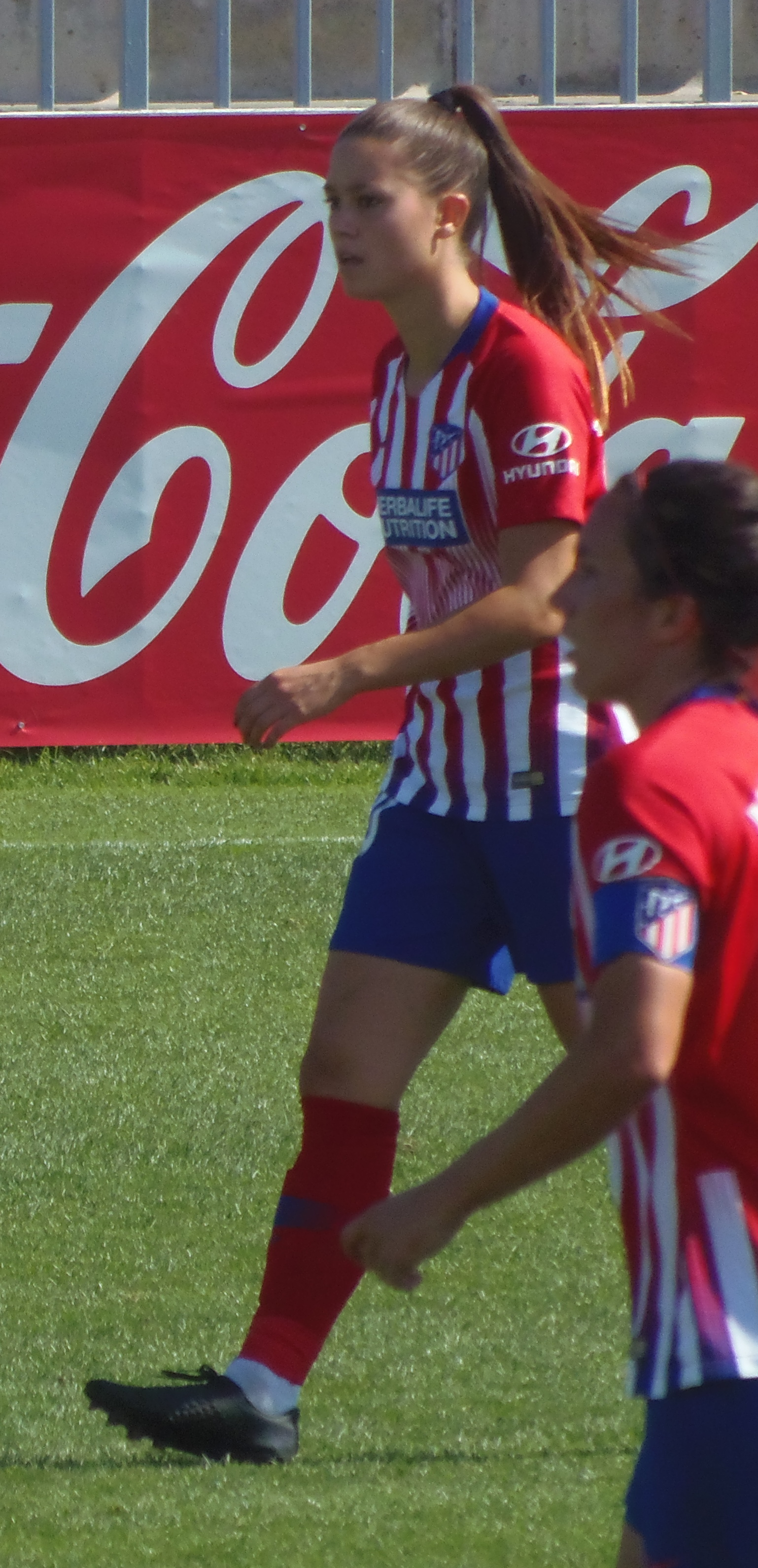
Viola Calligaris

- Emilie Mece - Juventus - 2026
- Lia Walti - Juventus - 2025
- Sandy Maendly – Verona – 2014
- Fanny Keizer – Verona – 2021–
- Nicole Studer – Verona – 2018–2019
- Madeleine Boll – Gommagomma – 1970
- Viola Calligaris – Juventus – 2024–
- Vanessa Bernauer – Roma – 2018–2022
- Nina Stapelfeldt – AC Milan, Como, Brescia – 2021–
- Sabina Wölbitsch – Reggiana – 1989–1990
- Alisha Lehmann – Juventus, Como – 2024–2026
- Gaelle Thalmann – Torres, Sassuolo, Atalanta, Verona – 2012–
- Julia Glaser – Lazio – 2020
- Alayah Pilgrim – Roma – 2024
- Eseosa Aigbogun – Roma – 2025
- Seraina Friedli – Fiorentia – 2020
- Giorgia Bianchi - Juventus - 2025
- Noemi Benz - Sassuolo - 2026
- Riola Xhemaili - Como - 2026

=== Turkey ===
- Sejde Abrahamsson – Napoli – 2021–2022

=== Ukraine ===
- Darya Kravets – Fiorentina, Como – 2021–
- Tetyana Romanenko – Empoli – 2015–2016
- Mariia Amel Taleb – Sampdoria – 2022

=== Wales ===
- Kayleigh Green (née Barton) – Calcio – 2017

== North and Central America, Caribbean (CONCACAF) ==
=== Aruba ===
- Vanessa Susanna – Hellas Verona – 2020–21

=== Bermuda ===
- Leilanni Nesbeth - Como - 2026

=== Canada ===
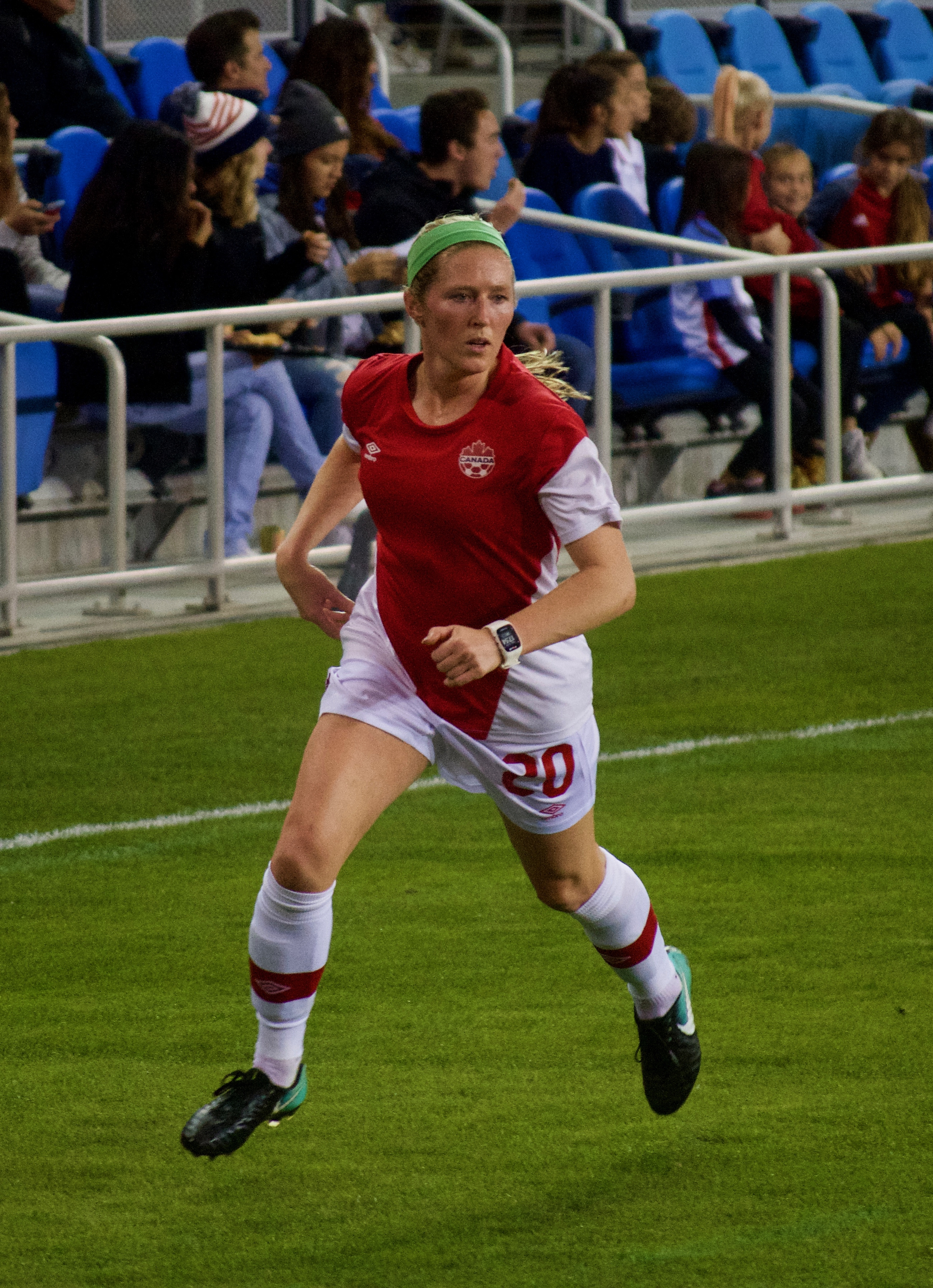
Maegan Kelly

- Maegan Kelly (née Rosa) – Atalanta, Florentia – 2018–2019
- Paige Culver – Pink Bari – 2019–2020
- Carmelina Moscato – UPC Tavagnacco – 2009–2010
- Danya Barsalona – UPC Tavagnacco – 2010–2011
- Julia Grosso – Juventus – 2022–2024
- Charmaine Hooper – Lazio – 1993–1994
- Alyssa Lagonia – Bardolino Verona – 2013–2014
- Lysianne Proulx – Juventus – 2024–
- Evelyne Viens – Roma – 2023–
- Selenia Iacchelli – Torres – 2010
- Mia Pante – Roma – 2025–
- Carla Portillo – Orobica – 2019
- Margot Shore - Como - 2026
- Ella Ottey - Roma - 2026
- Maya Antoine - Roma - 2026

=== Dominican Republic ===
- Samantha van Diemen – Roma – 2025–

=== El Salvador ===
- Samantha Fisher – Sassuolo – 2024–

=== Guatemala ===
- Ana Lucía Martínez – Pomigliano, Napoli, Roma, Sampdoria – 2020–2023

=== Haiti ===
- Brittany Raphino - Milan - 2026

=== Jamaica ===
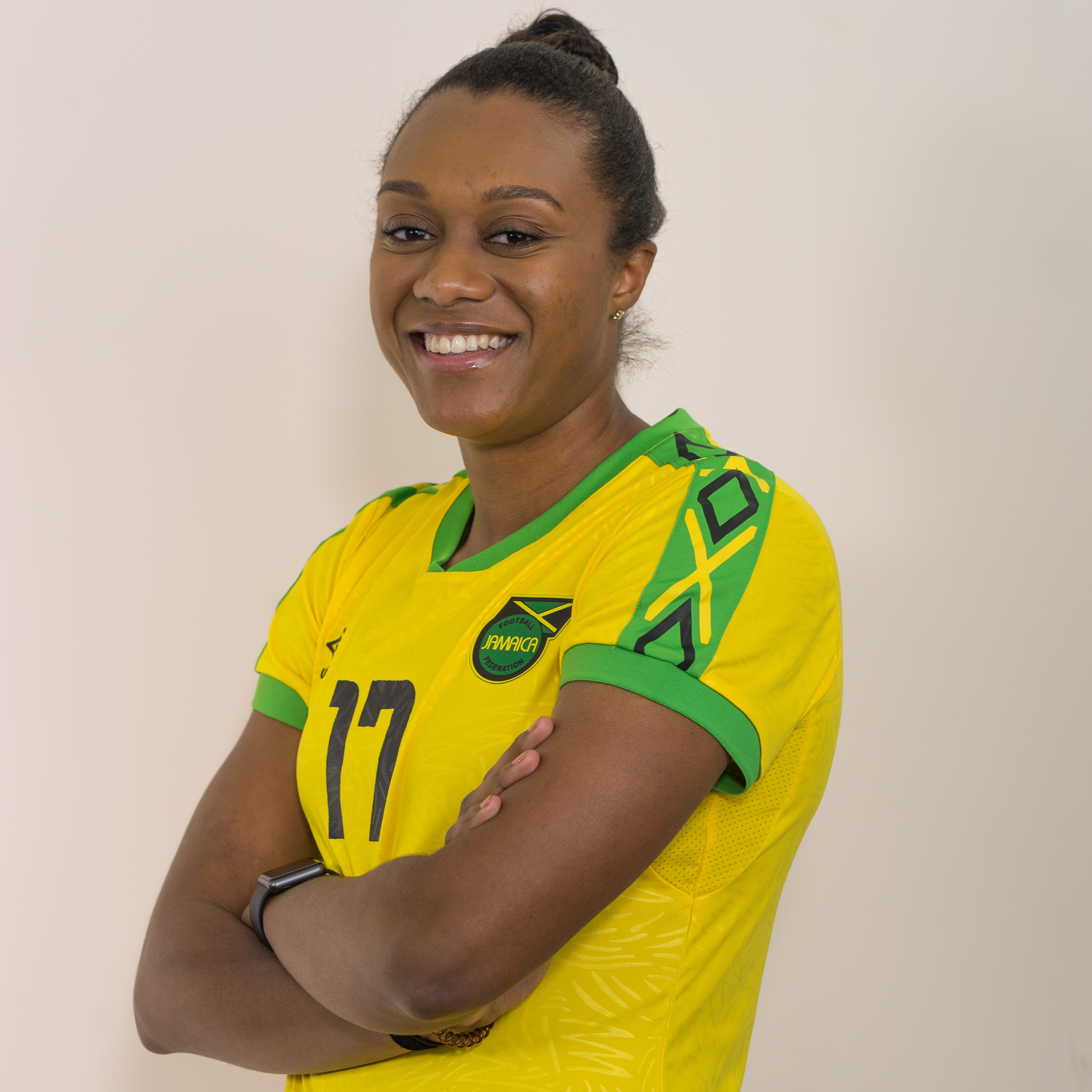
Allyson Swaby

- Vyan Sampson – San Marino – 2020
- Toriana Patterson – Bari – 2018–2019
- Trudi Carter – Roma – 2018
- Beverly Ranger – Lazio – 1977
- Allyson Swaby – Roma – 2018–
- Siobhan Wilson — Sassuolo – 2019

=== Martinique ===
- Emmeline Mainguy – Napoli – 2020–21

=== Mexico ===
- Mariana Díaz Leal – San Zaccaria – 2016–2017
- Estefania Fuentes – Sassuolo – 2020–2021

=== Panama ===
- Lineth Cedeño – Sampdoria, Hellas Verona – 2021–
- Carina Baltrip Reyes – Lazio – 2025

=== Suriname ===
- Kay-Lee de Sanders – AC Milan – 2025–
- Chanté Dompig – Empoli, AC Milan – 2020–2022, 2022–

=== United States ===
- Cameron Brooks - Napoli - 2026-
- Nicole Vernis - AC Milan - 2025-
- Alice Barbieri – Sampdoria – 2025–
- Abi Brighton – Juventus – 2025–
- Anna Buhigas – Verona, Tavagnacco, Pomigliano – 2017–2019, 2022–2024
- Celeste Boureille – AC Milan – 2022
- Jocelyn Charette – Torres – 2014
- Janelle Corbin – Fiorentia – 2019
- Mia Corbin – Parma – 2023
- Colette Cunningham – Lazio – 1994–1995
- Grace Cutler – Sassuolo – 2019–2020
- Talia DellaPeruta – Sampdoria – 2024
- Tori DellaPeurta – Pomigliano, Roma, Sampdoria, Fiorentina – 2022
- Emily Dolan – Ravenna – 2016
- Maya Doms – Sassuolo – 2025–
- Maya Evans – Sampdoria – 2025–
- Susanna Friedrichs (née Fitch) – Napoli – 2022–2023
- Emily Garnier – Empoli, Napoli – 2019
- April Hendrichs – Prato – 1988
- Brooke Hendrix – Brescia – 2017
- Jazmin Jackmon (née Wardlow) – Fiorentina – 2022
- Adrienne Jordan – Atalanta – 2018–
- Alex Kerr – Como – 2024–
- Camille Levin (née Ashton) – Fiorentina – 2014
- Megan McCarthy – Prato – 1988
- Jenna Menta – Fiorentina – 2022
- Natalie Muth – Napoli – 2024–
- Veronica Napoli – Verona – 2013
- Ashley Nick – Juventus – 2018
- Kacie Oilver – Tavagnacco – 2012–2013
- Jill Rutten – Verona, Torino – 1994–2003
- Aricca Vitanza – Orlandia, Como, Bari – 2010
- Catiana Vitanza – Como, Torres – 2008
- Antoinette Williams – Parma – 2022–
- Kaylie Ronan - Como - 2026

== Oceania (OFC) ==
=== New Zealand ===
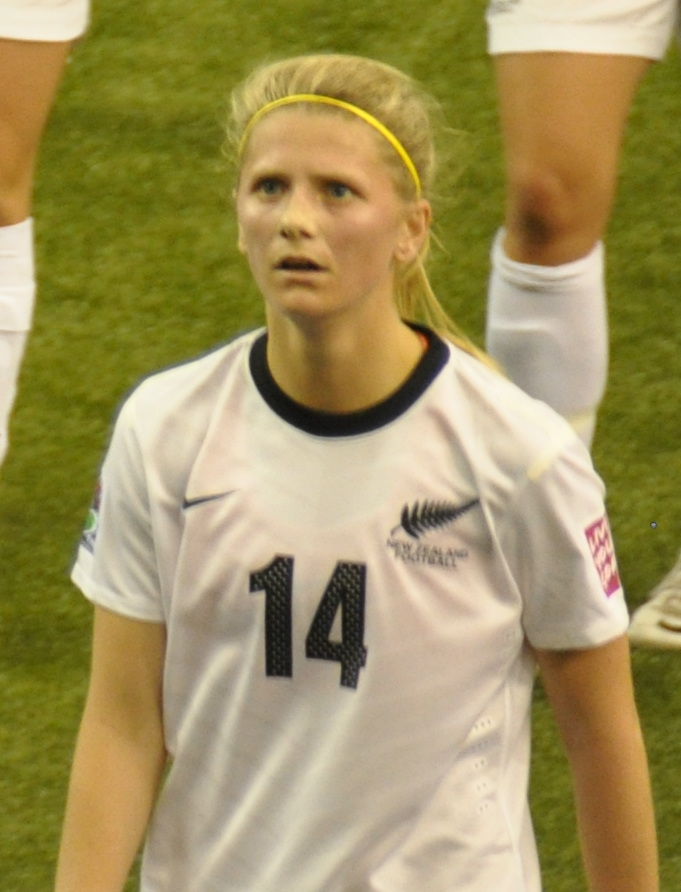
Katie Bowen

- Katie Bowen – Inter Milan – 2023–
- Kiara Bercelli – Sampdoria – 2024–
- Katie Rood – Juventus – 2017–2018

== South America (CONMEBOL) ==
=== Argentina ===
- Yésica Menín – San Marino – 2012–
- Dalila Ippólito – Parma, Pomigliano – 2021
- Rocío Bueno – Sassuolo – 2021–2022
- Sole Jaimes – Napoli – 2021–2022
- Gimena Blanco – Napoli – 2021
- Marianela Szymanowski – Pomigilano – 2023–
- Annika Paz - Milan - 2026

=== Brazil ===
- Milene Domingues – Fiammamonza – 2001–2002
- Dayane da Rocha – Verona – 2009–2013
- Joyce Borini – Como – 2022–2023
- Bel – Torino – 1994
- Kathellen – Inter Milan – 2020–2022
- Michael Jackson – Torino – 1995–1997
- Andressa Alves – AS Roma – 2019–2023
- Lucy – A.C F. Trani 80. – 1988
- Taty – Pomigliano, Sampdoria – 2022–
- Thaís Picarte – Lazio, Juventus – 2006–
- Thaisa – AC Milan – 2018–2019
- Maria Alves – Juventus – 2019–2021
- Marina Toscano – Verona – 2011–
- Verena – Pomilgiano – 2023–
- Maria Souza – Juventus – 2019–2021

=== Chile ===
- Millaray Cortes - Florence - 2026-

=== Colombia ===
- Ivonne Chacon - Fioreina - 2026
- Elexa Bahr - Genoa - 2025
- Lady Andrade – Milan – 2018–2020
- Yoreli Rincón – Torres, Sampdoria – 2015–2023
- Catalina Perez – Napoli, Fiorentina – 2019–2020

=== Ecuador ===
- Kerlly Real - Como - 2025-

=== Paraguay ===
- Soledad Belotto – Juventus – 2022–
- Isabel Ortiz – Sampdoria – 2021–2022

=== Peru ===
- Claudia Cagnina – Tavagnacco – 2019–2020

=== Venezuela ===
- Sonia O'Neill – Pink Sport Bari – 2018–2019

== Summary ==
=== Africa (CAF) ===
- Algeria, Cameroon, Egypt, Ghana, Nigeria, Malawi, Morocco, South Africa, Uganda

=== Asia (AFC) ===
- Afghanistan, Australia, China, Japan, South Korea, Philippines

=== Europe (UEFA) ===
- Albania, Austria, Belarus, Belgium, Bosnia and Herzegovina, Bulgaria, Croatia, Czech Republic, Denmark, England, Estonia, Finland, France, Germany, Greece, Hungary, Iceland, Israel, Kosovo, Latvia, Lithuania, Malta, Montenegro, Netherlands, Norway, Poland, Portugal, Republic of Ireland, Romania, Russia, San Marino, Serbia, Slovakia, Slovenia, Spain, Sweden, Switzerland, Turkey, Ukraine, Wales

=== North and Central America, Caribbean (CONCACAF) ===
- Aruba, Canada, Dominican Republic, Haiti, Martinique, Mexico, Panama, United States

=== Oceania (OFC) ===
- New Zealand

=== South America (CONMEBOL) ===
- Argentina, Brazil, Colombia, Ecuador, Paraguay, Peru, Venezuela

== Notes ==
1. Born in Brazil
2. Born in Canada
3. Born in Czech Republic
4. Born in England
5. Born in France
6. Born in Germany
7. Born in Guyana
8. Born in Liberia
9. Born in the Netherlands
10. Born in Nigeria
11. Born in Sweden
12. Born in the United Arab Emirates
13. Born in the United States
14. Capped for the France women's national under-16 football team
15. Capped for the France women's national under-17 football team
16. Capped for the France women's national under-19 football team
17. Capped for the Netherlands women's national under-15 football team
18. Capped for the Netherlands women's national under-16 football team
19. Capped for the Netherlands women's national under-17 football team
20. Capped for the Netherlands women's national under-18 football team
21. Capped for the Netherlands women's national under-19 football team
22. Capped for the Netherlands women's national under-20 football team
23. Capped for the Netherlands women's national under-23 football team
24. Capped for the Netherlands women's national football team
25. Capped for the Sweden women's national under-15 football team
26. Capped for the Sweden women's national under-23 football team
27. Capped for the United States women's national under-20 football team
28. Capped for the United States women's national under-23 football team
