= List of French women's football transfers summer 2015 =

This is a list of French women's football transfers in the summer transfer window 2015. Division 1 Féminine clubs are listed according to the 2014-15 season table.

== Division 1 Féminine ==
=== In ===
- As of 11 October 2015. Source:

Team	Goalkeepers	Defenders	Midfielders	Forwards
Olympique Lyon	(China) Wang (Turbine)	Mbock-Bathy (Guingamp); Cascarino (free agent)	(Germany) Bremer (Turbine); Kaci (PSG); Lavogez (Montpellier)	
Paris St.-Germain		(Brazil) Érika (Centro Olímpico)	(Sweden) Dahlkvist (Örebro)	(Brazil) Cristiane (Centro Olímpico) (Germany) Mittag (Rosengård)
FCF Juvisy	Benameur (PSG); Jeanjean (Aurillac)	Legrout (Arras)	Bilbault (Soyaux); Vaysse (Rodez)	(United States) Coleman (UCF Knights)
Montpellier HSC		Agard (free agent); Romanelli (Albi)	(Spain) Torrecilla (Barcelona); Uffren (free agent)	(Brazil) Andressa (São José); Julian (Hénin-Beaumont); Léger (Metz)
EA Guingamp		Carage (Lyon); Debever (St.-Étienne); Lorgeré (St.-Étienne)	Benoit (St.-Étienne); Plaza (Lyon)	
ASJ Soyaux		Catalano (Yzeure); Kaya (Condé)	Hurault (Guingamp)	Blais (Yzeure); Ninot (Issy)
Rodez AF		Alard (Muret); Bornes (Albi)	Barbance (Albi)	
AS St.-Étienne	Peyraud-Magnin (Lyon)	Brevet (Yellow Jackets)	(Sweden) Karlsson (Brescia); Peruzzetto (Albi)	
ASPTT Albi	(Portugal) Morais (Yzeure)	Cazes (Toulouse); Marcinowski (Arras); Mitchai (Muret)	(Algeria) Benlazar (Toulouse); Condon (Toulouse) (Taiwan) Lin (Valladolid); Marteau (free agent)	(Taiwan) Tseng (free agent)
ESOF La Roche	Nerbonne (Condé)	Liaigre (free agent)	Coudrin (Yzeure); Pugnetti (Arras)	(Guinea) Baldé (Guingamp); Fragoli (Arras)
FF Nîmes			Rubio (Marseille)	Saulnier (Monteux)
VGA St.-Maur			(Cameroon) Zouga (Chênois)	

- ^{1} On loan
- ^{2} Back from loan

=== Out ===
- As of 11 October 2015. Source:

Team	Goalkeepers	Defenders	Midfielders	Forwards
Olympique Lyon	Peyraud-Magnin (St.-Étienne)	Carage (Guingamp)	Bussaglia (Wolfsburg) (Switzerland) Dickenmann (Wolfsburg); Plaza (Guingamp)	Traoré (free agent)
Paris St.-Germain	Benameur (Juvisy)	(Italy) Gama (Brescia) (Germany) Krahn (Leverkusen)	(Germany) Bresonik (Duisburg); Kaci (Lyon)	
FCF Juvisy	(Russia) Arsenyeva (Yzeure)		Benmokhtar (free agent); Compper-Banguillot (free agent); Coudon (free agent)	Brétigny (Marseille)
Montpellier HSC			Lavogez (Lyon)	Makanza (Turbine); Thomas (Basel)^{1} Wenger (Metz)
EA Guingamp		Février (Saint-Malo); Hamon (free agent); Mbock-Bathy (Lyon)	Furuberget (free agent); Gorce (Toulouse); Hurault (Soyaux)	(Guinea) Baldé (La Roche); Le Dins (Saint-Malo)
ASJ Soyaux	Nadal (Blanquefort)	Eymard (free agent); Pascaud (retired)	Bilbault (Juvisy); Constant (Toulouse); L'Herideau (free agent)	Migot (free agent)
Rodez AF	Fabries (free agent)	Buscaylet (free agent)	Boutonnet (free agent); Cauderlier (free agent); Mouly (Toulouse); Vaysse (Juvisy)	Ribeyra (free agent)
AS St.-Étienne	Mancion (Rouvroy); Perrodin (Claix)	Debever (Guingamp); Lorgeré (Guingamp); Multari (Marseille); Soulard (Dijon); Velay (free agent)	Benoit (Guingamp); Coton-Pélagie (Marseille); Duclos (free agent)	Audemar (Claix); Bouchet (Marseille)
ASPTT Albi	D'Andrade (Issy) (United States) Fitzsimmons (free agent)	Bornes (Rodez); Gazzin (free agent); Romanelli (Montpellier)	Barbance (Rodez); Boilard (Claix); Peruzzetto (St.-Étienne); Trevisan (Dijon)	(United States) Brown (free agent); Laplagne (free agent)
ESOF La Roche			Gauvrit (free agent); Richard (free agent)	Sauques (free agent)
FF Nîmes			Bussi (free agent); Debaty (free agent); Richy (free agent)	(Canada) Callegher (free agent)
VGA St.-Maur				

- ^{1} On loan
- ^{2} Back from loan

== See also ==
- 2015–16 Division 1 Féminine
