= 2005 UEFA Women's Under-19 Championship =

Tournament details
- Host country: Hungary
- Dates: 20–31 July
- Teams: 8

Final positions
- Champions: Russia (1st title)
- Runners-up: France

Tournament statistics
- Matches played: 16
- Goals scored: 60 (3.75 per match)
- Attendance: 12,740 (796 per match)
- Top scorer(s): (Russia) Elena Danilova (9 goals)
- Best player: (Russia) Elena Danilova

The 2005 UEFA Women's Under-19 Championship was the holding of the UEFA Women's Under-19 Championship in Hungary from July 20–31, 2005. Russia won this edition of the competition in the final against France.

== Participating teams ==
Eight national teams participated—seven which qualified from earlier stages, plus Hungary, which received an automatic berth as the host nation. They were split into two groups of four: Group A and Group B. Each team in a group played each other once, with the top two teams in each group progressing to the semi-finals. The winner faced the runner-up of the other group in a play-off, with the winner of each semi-final advancing to the final to determine the champion.

A fifth-place playoff had to be made because Russia, host of the 2006 FIFA U-20 Women's World Championship, progressed to the semi-final. All semi-finalists of the UEFA Women's Under-19 Championship qualified to the FIFA U-20 Women's World Championship.

=== Group A ===
- Hungary
- Germany
- Finland
- Switzerland

=== Group B ===
- Russia
- England
- Scotland
- France

== Stadiums used for tournament ==
- ZTE Arena, Zalaegerszeg
- Perutz Stadium, Pápa
- Bük
- Andráshida

== Results ==
=== Group stage ===
==== Group A ====
Team	GP	W	D	L	GF	GA	Pts
Germany	3	3	0	0	10	3	9
Finland	3	2	0	1	7	5	6
Switzerland	3	1	0	2	8	10	3
Hungary	3	0	0	3	1	8	0

July 20, 2005

Finland	4–2	Switzerland
Sainio 33'; Sällström 63', 68', 89'	(Report)	Abbé 76'; Thalmann (red card) 87'; Moser 92'

Perutz Stadium, Pápa
Referee: Maaren Olander (Estonia)

July 20, 2005

Hungary	0–2	Germany
	(Report)	Okoyino da Mbabi 50'; Hanebeck 58'

Bük
Referee: Silvia Tea Spinelli (Italy)

July 22, 2005

Hungary	0–2	Finland
	(Report)	Laihanen 21'; Puranen 70'

Perutz Stadium, Pápa
Referee: Anelia Sinabova (Bulgaria)

July 22, 2005

Germany	5–2	Switzerland
Okoyino da Mbabi 10'; Blässe 35', 76'; Laudehr 61'; Niemeier 85'	(Report)	Bürki 37'; Bernauer 50'

Bük
Referee: Lena Arwedahl (Sweden)

July 25, 2005

Germany	3–1	Finland
Banecki 20'; Okoyino da Mbabi 22'; I. Kerschowski 43'	(Report)	Sällström 57'

Bük
Referee: Martina Blahova (Czech Republic)

July 25, 2005

Switzerland	4–1	Hungary
Bürki 1', 16', 74' (pen.); Moser 54'	(Report)	Jakab 48'; Stoiber (red card) 72'

ZTE Arena, Zalaegerszeg
Referee: Mihaela Gurdon Basimamovic (Croatia)

==== Group B ====
Team	GP	W	D	L	GF	GA	Pts
France	3	2	1	0	8	2	7
Russia	3	2	0	1	7	5	6
England	3	1	1	1	5	4	4
Scotland	3	0	0	3	2	11	0

July 20, 2005

France	4–0	Russia
Peruzzetto 24'; Necib 33'; Thomis 42'; Castera 95'	(Report)

Andráshida
Referee: Lena Arwedahl (Sweden)

July 20, 2005

Scotland	1–3	England
Hughes 90'	(Report)	Aluko 28', 69'; Sanderson 93'

ZTE Arena, Zalaegerszeg
Referee: Martina Blahova (Czech Republic)

July 22, 2005

France	3–1	Scotland
Thomson 40' (o.g.); Castera 50'; Courteille 78'	(Report)	Liddell 14'

Andráshida
Referee: Maaren Olander (Estonia)

July 22, 2005

Russia	2–1	England
Danilova 17', 87' (pen.)	(Report)	Aluko 65'

ZTE Arena, Zalaegerszeg
Referee: Mihaela Gurdon Basimamovic (Croatia)

July 25, 2005

Russia	5–0	Scotland
Terekhova 1'; Morozova 12'; Danilova 57', 81', 86'	(Report)

Andráshida
Referee: Silvia Tea Spinelli (Italy)

July 25, 2005

England	1–1	France
Aluko 6'	(Report)	Thomis 67'

Perutz Stadium, Pápa
Referee: Anelia Sinabova (Bulgaria)

=== Knockout stage ===
Semi-finals
Germany	1
Russia	3
France	1
Finland	0

Final
Russia	2 (6)
France	2 (5)
Fifth Place Playoff
Switzerland	2
England	1

==== Fifth Place Playoff ====
July 27, 2005

Switzerland	2–1	England
Eggenberger 29'; Bürki 50'	(Report)	Carney 40'

Bük
Referee: Lena Arwedahl (Sweden)

==== Semi-finals ====
July 28, 2005

Germany	1–3	Russia
Okoyino da Mbabi 44'	(Report)	Danilova 43', 65', 91'

ZTE Arena, Zalaegerszeg
Referee: Silvia Tea Spinelli (Italy)

July 28, 2005

France	1–0	Finland
Delie 75'	(Report)

ZTE Arena, Zalaegerszeg
Referee: Mihaela Gurdon Basimamovic (Croatia)

==== Final ====
July 31, 2005

Russia	2–2 (a.e.t.)	France
Terekhova 47'; Danilova 77'	(Report)	Thomis 67'; Courteille 86'
Penalties
Morozova (penalty scored); Titova (penalty missed); Afanasova (penalty scored); Petrova (penalty scored); Danilova (penalty scored); Todua (penalty scored); Tsybutovich (penalty scored)	6–5	(penalty scored) Peruzzetto; (penalty scored) Necib; (penalty scored) Dahou; (penalty scored) Mula; (penalty missed) Bouhaddi; (penalty scored) Ducher; (penalty missed) Boulleau

ZTE Arena, Zalaegerszeg
Referee: Lena Arwedahl (Sweden)

== Awards ==
2005 UEFA Women's Under-19 champions

Russia
First title

== Goalscorers ==
9 goals

- (Russia) Elena Danilova

5 goals

- (Switzerland) Vanessa Bürki

4 goals

- (England) Eniola Aluko
- (Finland) Linda Sällström
- (Germany) Célia Okoyino da Mbabi

3 goals

- (France) Elodie Thomis

2 goals

- (France) Marie Pierre Castera
- (France) Morgane Courteille
- (Germany) Anna Blässe
- (Russia) Elena Terekhova
- (Switzerland) Martina Moser

1 goal

- (England) Karen Carney
- (England) Lianne Sanderson
- (Finland) Taru Laihanen
- (Finland) Leena Puranen
- (Finland) Essi Sainio
- (France) Marie-Laure Delie
- (France) Louisa Necib
- (France) Julie Peruzzetto
- (Germany) Nicole Banecki
- (Germany) Patricia Hanebeck
- (Germany) Isabel Kerschowski
- (Germany) Simone Laudehr
- (Germany) Annika Niemeier
- (Hungary) Réka Jakab
- (Russia) Elena Morozova
- (Scotland) Fay Hughes
- (Scotland) Pamela Liddell
- (Switzerland) Caroline Abbé
- (Switzerland) Vanessa Bernauer
- (Switzerland) Katrin Eggenberger

own goal

- (Scotland) Hollie Thomson (playing against France)
