= Sara Ketiš =

Slovenian footballer

Personal information
- Date of birth: 16 September 1996 (age 30)
- Place of birth: Slovenia,
- Position: Forward

Team information
- Current team: Pink Bari
- Number: 9

Youth career
- –2014: Maribor

Senior career*
Years	Team	Apps	(Gls)
2011–2019	Maribor	64	(14)
2019–	Pink Bari	15	(0)

International career^{‡}
2011–2012	Slovenia U17	6	(0)
2013–2015	Slovenia U19	8	(0)
2014–	Slovenia	2	(0)
- * Club domestic league appearances and goals as of 22 February 2020 ‡ National team caps and goals as of 10 March 2020

Sara Ketiš (born 16 September 1996) is a Slovenian footballer who plays as a forward for Italian Serie A club ASD Pink Sport Time and the Slovenia women's national team.
