= 2012–13 Slovenian Women's Cup =

Tournament details
- Country: Slovenia
- Dates: 12 August 2012 – 29 May 2013
- Teams: 10

Final positions
- Champions: Pomurje (4th title)
- Runners-up: Rudar Škale
- Semifinalists: Radomlje; Jevnica

Tournament statistics
- Matches played: 11
- Goals scored: 64 (5.82 per match)
- Top goal scorer: Tjaša Tibaut (8)

Location of teams in the 2012–13 Slovenian Women's Cup

The 2012–13 Slovenian Women's Cup, held from August 12, 2012 to May 29, 2013, was the 14th edition of the Slovenian women's football national cup. It was contested by the nine teams in the 2012–13 Slovenian top league and ŽNK Izola.

The defending champions ŽNK Pomurje again defeated ŽNK Rudar Škale in the final, held in Koper, to win its fourth title.

== Results ==
=== Preliminary round ===
	Result
Jevnica	4–0	Izola
Dornava	1–6	Maribor

=== Final rounds ===
Quarterfinals
Slovenj Gradec	0
Radomlje	3
Krka	2
Pomurje	13
Velesovo	1
Rudar Škale	6
Maribor	0
Jevnica	2

Semifinals
Radomlje	0	0	0
Pomurje	9	6	15
Rudar Škale	3	3	6
Jevnica	0	1	1

Finals
Pomurje	3
Rudar Škale	1

Source: NZS.si

=== Final ===
29 May 2013
16:00 CEST

Pomurje	3–1	Rudar Škale
Eržen 52'; Vrabel 70'; Nikl 84'	Report (in Slovene)	Bric 17'

Bonifika Stadium, Koper
Attendance: 300
Referee: Mihael Antič

== Top scorers ==
Rank	Player	Club	Goals
1	(Slovenia) Tjaša Tibaut	Pomurje	8
2	(Slovenia) Mateja Zver	Pomurje	5
3; 3; 3	(Serbia) Sanja Malinić (Bosnia and Herzegovina) Moira Murič (Slovenia) Andreja Nikl	Rudar Škale; Rudar Škale; Pomurje	4; 4; 4
6; 6; 6	(Slovenia) Jelena Batanjski (Slovenia) Kaja Eržen (Slovenia) Tanja Vrabel	Jevnica; Pomurje; Pomurje	3; 3; 3
9; 9; 9; 9; 9	(Slovenia) Špela Kolbl (Slovenia) Nina Marič (Slovenia) Saša Peruš (Slovenia) Polona Petrač (Slovenia) Špela Zagoršak	Pomurje; Pomurje; Maribor; Jevnica; Maribor	2; 2; 2; 2; 2
