= Monika Žunkovič =

Slovenian footballer

Personal information
- Full name: Monika Žunkovič
- Date of birth: 7 September 1989 (age 37)
- Position: Midfielder

Senior career*
Years	Team	Apps	(Gls)
2004–2005	Davidov Hram Sobota	16	(7)
2005–2007	Pomurje	33	(35)
2008–2011	Maribor	56	(44)
2011	Krka	0	(0)
2018–2019	MB Tabor	9	(3)

International career
- Slovenia
- * Club domestic league appearances and goals

Monika Žunkovič (born 7 September 1989) is a Slovenian football midfielder. She has played for Davidov Hram Sobota, Pomurje, and Maribor in the Slovenian Women's League.

She was a member of the Slovenian national team.
