= Andreja Nikl =

Slovenian footballer

Personal information
- Full name: Andreja Nikl
- Date of birth: 5 November 1985 (age 41)
- Place of birth: SFR Yugoslavia
- Position: Defender

Team information
- Current team: Pomurje
- Number: 21

Senior career*
| Years | Team | Apps | (Gls) |
| 2000–2004 | Maribor | 42 | (18) |
| 2004–2007 | Pomurje | 57 | (61) |
| 2007–2011 | Krka | 67 | (36) |
| 2011 | Maribor | 5 | (4) |
| 2012–2017 | Pomurje | 69 | (36) |

International career^{‡}
| 2009– | Slovenia | 17 | (2) |
- * Club domestic league appearances and goals as of August 2017 ‡ National team caps and goals as of 21:16, 30 March 2015 (UTC)

Andreja Nikl (born 5 November 1985) is a Slovenian football defender currently playing for ZNK Pomurje.

== International career ==
Goals scored for the Slovenian WNT in official competitions
| Competition | Stage | Date | Location | Opponent | Goals | Result | Overall |
|---|---|---|---|---|---|---|---|
| 2007 FIFA World Cup | Qualifiers | 2005–09–24 | Slavonski Brod | Croatia | 1 | 5–3 | 6 |
| 2007 FIFA World Cup | Qualifiers | 2005–11–06 | Krško | Malta | 2 | 4–1 | 6 |
| 2007 FIFA World Cup | Qualifiers | 2006–05–07 | Sarajevo | Bosnia and Herzegovina | 3 | 6–1 | 6 |
| 2015 FIFA World Cup | Qualifiers | 2013–09–26 | Senec | Slovakia | 1 | 3–1 | 2 |
| 2015 FIFA World Cup | Qualifiers | 2014–09–17 | Dravograd | Slovakia | 1 | 2–1 | 2 |

== Honours ==
Pomurje

Winner

- Slovenian Women's League: 2012–13, 2013–14
- Slovenian Women's Cup: 2012–13, 2013–14

Krka

Winner

- Slovenian Women's League: 2010–11
