= Conc =

Conc may refer to:

- Concentration in a chemical mixture
- Dominika Čonč (born 1993), Slovenian footballer
- Vladimir Čonč (1928–2012), Croatian footballer
