= Natalija Golob =

Slovenian footballer

Personal information
- Full name: Natalija Golob
- Date of birth: 18 December 1986 (age 39)
- Place of birth: SFR Yugoslavia
- Position: Striker

Senior career*
Years	Team	Apps	(Gls)
2006–	Slovenj Gradec	103	(160)

International career
2007–	Slovenia		
- * Club domestic league appearances and goals

Natalija Golob (born 18 December 1986) is a Slovenian football striker, currently playing for ŽNK Slovenj Gradec in the Slovenian League. She was the championship's top scorer in 2008.

She is a member of the Slovenian national team since 2007.
