= 1992–93 Frauen-Bundesliga =

Frauen-Bundesliga
- Season: 1992–93
- Champions: TuS Niederkirchen; 1st Bundesliga title 1st German title
- Relegated: TV Jahn Delmenhorst; Wacker München; STV Lövenich; TSV Ludwigsburg
- Top goalscorer: (Germany) Heidi Mohr (22)

The 1992–93 Frauen-Bundesliga was the third season of the Frauen-Bundesliga, Germany's premier football league. It was the last time games were played over 80 minutes (2 x 40). In the final, TuS Niederkirchen defeated TSV Siegen to win their first title.

== Northern conference ==
=== Standings ===
Pos	Team	Pld	W	D	L	GF	GA	GD	Pts	Qualification or relegation
1	TSV Siegen (Note: 1991–92 Bundesliga (women) champion)	18	16	1	1	61	6	+55	33	Participant of the semi-final
2	Grün-Weiß Brauweiler	18	12	4	2	45	10	+35	28	Participant of the semi-final
3	VfB Rheine	18	10	2	6	35	21	+14	22	
4	Fortuna Sachsenroß Hannover	18	9	3	6	32	26	+6	21	
5	KBC Duisburg	18	7	6	5	33	28	+5	20	
6	Tennis Borussia Berlin	18	8	2	8	23	25	−2	18	
7	VfR Eintracht Wolfsburg	18	7	1	10	27	42	−15	15	
8	SSG 09 Bergisch Gladbach	18	5	2	11	22	42	−20	12	
9	STV Lövenich (Note: Promoted from the Regionalliga last season)	18	2	3	13	14	43	−29	7	Relegated to Regional-/Oberliga
10	TV Jahn Delmenhorst	18	0	4	14	5	54	−49	4	Relegated to Regional-/Oberliga

Source: RSSSF

=== Results ===
Home \ Away	SIE	GWB	RHE	FSH	KBC	TBB	EWO	BGL	LÖV	JDH
TSV Siegen		0–0	3–0	2–0	2–0	2–0	1–2	3–0	3–0	8–0
Grün-Weiß Brauweiler	0–1		2–1	5–2	2–2	4–0	5–1	3–1	6–0	1–0
VfB Rheine	1–3	0–2		0–0	1–0	1–0	2–0	3–1	3–0	4–0
Fortuna Sachsenroß Hannover	0–6	1–0	3–3		1–1	2–0	1–0	0–1	2–0	4–0
KBC Duisburg	2–4	0–0	3–2	1–3		0–0	3–1	3–1	3–3	1–1
Tennis Borussia Berlin	1–5	0–3	2–0	3–2	0–3		1–2	4–0	1–0	1–0
VfR Eintracht Wolfsburg	0–6	0–4	1–2	1–2	5–0	0–4		3–2	2–1	3–0
SSG 09 Bergisch Gladbach	0–6	0–3	0–1	3–2	1–5	1–3	5–2		0–0	3–0
STV Lövenich	0–3	0–4	0–3	0–3	0–2	0–3	2–2	1–3		4–0
TV Jahn Delmenhorst	0–3	1–1	1–8	0–4	1–4	0–0	1–2	0–0	0–3	

Legend: Blue = home team win; Yellow = draw; Red = away team win.

== Southern conference ==
=== Standings ===
Pos	Team	Pld	W	D	L	GF	GA	GD	Pts	Qualification or relegation
1	TuS Niederkirchen	18	15	2	1	52	9	+43	32	Participant of the semi-final
2	FSV Frankfurt	18	11	3	4	34	16	+18	25	Participant of the semi-final
3	VfR 09 Saarbrücken	18	8	4	6	21	19	+2	20	
4	SG Praunheim	18	8	4	6	20	19	+1	20	
5	VfL Sindelfingen	18	6	5	7	26	20	+6	17	
6	TuS Ahrbach	18	7	3	8	30	40	−10	17	
7	SC Klinge Seckach	18	5	5	8	27	27	0	15	
8	TSV Battenberg (Note: Promoted from the Regionalliga previous season)	18	4	5	9	18	34	−16	13	
9	Wacker München	18	1	10	7	17	28	−11	12	Relegated to Regional-/Oberliga
10	TSV Ludwigsburg	18	4	1	13	11	44	−33	9	Relegated to Regional-/Oberliga

=== Results ===
Home \ Away	NIE	FSV	SAR	SGP	SIN	AHR	KLS	BAT	WMU	LUD
TuS Niederkirchen		1–0	2–0	1–1	3–2	3–0	3–1	4–0	1–0	6–0
FSV Frankfurt	1–0		1–0	0–2	0–2	5–0	5–2	0–0	2–2	1–0
VfR 09 Saarbrücken	1–5	3–2		2–1	1–0	0–1	2–1	3–0	1–1	2–0
SG Praunheim	0–2	1–2	1–2		1–0	2–1	2–1	2–1	1–1	1–0
VfL Sindelfingen	2–4	0–1	0–0	1–1		1–1	1–2	0–0	0–2	3–0
TuS Ahrbach	1–5	0–4	0–2	4–2	1–2		4–3	2–0	2–2	4–1
SC Klinge Seckach	0–0	0–1	2–1	0–1	1–1	0–1		3–3	1–1	3–0
TSV Battenberg	0–5	3–3	1–1	1–0	0–2	3–4	1–2		2–1	1–0
Wacker München	0–2	0–4	0–0	0–0	1–4	2–2	0–0	0–0		2–2
TSV Ludwigsburg	0–5	0–2	1–0	0–1	1–5	3–2	0–5	1–0	2–1	

Source: RSSSF
Legend: Blue = home team win; Yellow = draw; Red = away team win.

== Semifinals ==
Match		1st leg	2nd leg	Agg.
TSV Siegen	FSV Frankfurt	2–0	3–0	5 – 0
TuS Niederkirchen	Grün-Weiß Brauweiler	4–3	1–1	5 – 4

== Final ==
TuS Niederkirchen	TSV Siegen
20 June 1993; Limburgerhof; Spectators: 5,000; Referee: Isabelle Peil (Saarbrücken)
Pia Boss – Michaela Trimpop – Anja Heitmann, Claudia Obermeier, Meier – Sabina Wölbitsch (Sonja Brecht 70), Christine Fütterer, Ute Scherer, Steffi Dums (Carmen Seyfert 85) – Heidi Mohr, Patricia Grigoli	Silke Rottenberg – Andrea Euteneuer – Jutta Nardenbach, Marjan Veldhuizen, Loes Camper – Britta Unsleber, Heike Czyganowski, Silvia Neid (Fitzner 88), Doris Fitschen – Michaela Kubat, Mink (Nadine Siwek 91)
1–1 Mohr (42, Penalty after Handball); 2–1 Mohr (99)	0–1 Neid (24)
	Unsleber (Handball)

== Top scorers ==
Rank	Player	Team	Goals
1	(Germany) Heidi Mohr	TuS Niederkirchen	22

== Qualification ==
=== Group North ===
Pos	Team	Pld	W	D	L	GF	GA	GD	Pts	Qualification
1	Schmalfelder SV	6	5	1	0	15	1	+14	11	Qualified for the Bundesliga 1993–94
2	FC Rumeln-Kaldenhausen	6	3	2	1	16	7	+9	8	Qualified for the Bundesliga 1993–94
3	SG Wattenscheid 09	6	2	0	4	11	13	−2	4	
4	1. FC Lübars	6	0	1	5	2	23	−21	1	

Source: RSSSF

=== Group South 1 ===
Pos	Team	Pld	W	D	L	GF	GA	GD	Pts	Qualification
1	SC 07 Bad Neuenahr	6	5	1	0	23	3	+20	11	Qualified for the Bundesliga 1993–94
2	SV Flörsheim	6	4	1	1	16	10	+6	9	
3	TSV Crailsheim	6	1	1	4	11	14	−3	3	
4	BSV Unterkotzau	6	0	1	5	4	27	−23	1	

Source: RSSSF

=== Group South 2 ===
Pos	Team	Pld	W	D	L	GF	GA	GD	Pts	Qualification
1	TuS Wörrstadt	6	4	2	0	18	6	+12	10	Qualified for the Bundesliga 1993–94
2	SC Freiburg	6	3	2	1	12	5	+7	8	
3	FSV Viktoria Jägersburg	6	2	1	3	7	14	−7	5	
4	SG Kirchardt	6	0	1	5	5	17	−12	1	

Source: RSSSF
