= Saša Kolman =

Slovenian footballer

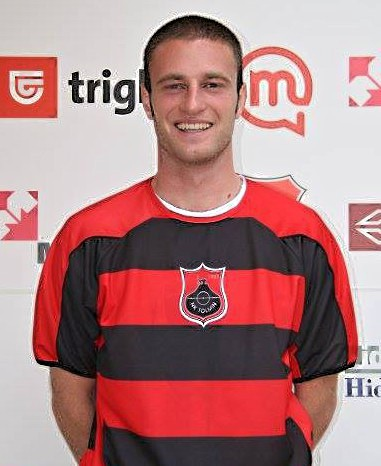

Personal information
- Date of birth: 1 May 1984 (age 42)
- Position: Defender

Team information
- Current team: Slovenia (head coach)

Youth career
- Gorica

Senior career*
Years	Team	Apps	(Gls)
2002–2009	Tolmin		
2010	Nafta Lendava	6	(0)
2011	Primorje	2	(0)
2011	Tolmin		
2012	Suðuroy	22	(0)
2013–2014	Tolmin	17	(0)

Managerial career
- 2012: Suðuroy (player-coach)
- 2019: Gorica
- 2023–: Slovenia (women's)
- * Club domestic league appearances and goals

Saša Kolman (born 1 May 1984) is a Slovenian retired footballer.
