= Pamela Liddell =

Scottish footballer (born 1986)

Personal information
- Date of birth: 11 June 1986 (age 40)
- Place of birth: Bellshill, Scotland
- Position: Forward

Senior career*
| Years | Team | Apps | (Gls) |
| 2001–2007 | Hamilton Academical | | |
| 2006 | Þór/KA | 6 | (2) |
| 2008 | Hamilton Academical | | |
| 2008 | Stjarnan | 15 | (3) |
| 2010–2011 | Hamilton Academical Res. | | |
| 2011–2012 | Motherwell Ladies | | |
| 2012–2013 | Wishaw Juniors | | |
| 2013–2014 | Hearts | | |
| 2014– | Motherwell Ladies | | |

International career^{‡}
| 2005– | Scotland | | |
- * Club domestic league appearances and goals as of 12:00, 26 August 2009 (UTC) ‡ National team caps and goals as of 10:50, 7 November 2013 (UTC)

Pamela Liddell (born 11 June 1986) is a Scottish international football striker. She plays for Motherwell Ladies in the SWFL Div 2 SE/West, having previously played professionally for Stjarnan and for local rivals Hamilton Academical in the SWPL. Liddell has won 14 caps for Scotland and was born in Bellshill.

== Club career ==
Pamela spent most of her youth career with local side Wishaw Girls but when she turned 15 years old, she signed for Hamilton Accies in the SWPL, the top flight of woman's football in Scotland. She spent seven years with Accies, before heading to Iceland to play for Þór/KA. She had a brief spell back at New Douglas Park before signing professional terms with Stjarnan aged just 22.

She was eight months a pro at the Samsung völlurinn before having to return home to have her first child, a son called Kayden. After some time out of the game, she returned to play for a third spell at Accies before a successful season in Claret and Amber with Motherwell, the team that would be the prelude to her current club.

However, after the 'Well team folded, she was soon on the move again, signing for the female side of Wishaw Juniors F.C., where she was handed the captain's armband. It would prove a successful season, with the team winning the League, League Cup and Scottish Cup in a memorable campaign.

That tempted her back into the senior woman's game and she signed for Hearts in 2013. She was in the Capital for one full year before returning to Lanarkshire in 2014, to spearhead the Motherwell attack.

She won the SWFL Player of the Month award for May/June, after netting an incredible 71 goals in the first 18 matches of Motherwell's 2015 season.
