= Anja Milenkovič =

Slovenian footballer (born 1982)

Personal information
- Date of birth: 23 June 1982 (age 44)
- Place of birth: Ljubljana, SFR Yugoslavia
- Height: 1.89 m (6 ft 2 1/2 in)
- Position: Midfielder

Team information
- Current team: ŽNK Olimpija Ljubljana
- Number: 6

Youth career
- 2001: University of Ljubljana

Senior career*
Years	Team	Apps	(Gls)
2001–2004	Tiskarna Novo Mesto		
2004–2008	ŽNK Krka		
2008–2009	UPC Tavagnacco		
2009–2011	SK Kelag Kärnten		
2011–2013	Calcio Chiasiellis		
2013–2015	Sturm Graz		
2015–2016	LUV Graz		
2016–	ŽNK Olimpija Ljubljana		

International career
2009–2014	Slovenia		
- * Club domestic league appearances and goals

Anja Milenkovič (born 23 June 1982) is a Slovenian footballer who plays for LUV Graz of the Austrian ÖFB-Frauenliga and the Slovenia national team. She has previously played in the Italian Serie A, for UPC Tavagnacco and Chiasiellis.

== Career ==
Milenkovič started her career in 2001 playing for Tiskarna Novo Mesto. Three years later she signed for national powerhouse Krka Novo Mesto. There she won three Slovenian championships and two Slovenian cups and played in the UEFA Women's Cup.

After four seasons with Krka, in 2008 she started her career abroad signing for UPC Tavagnacco in Italy's Serie A. One year later she moved to Austria to play for SK Kelag Kärnten of the Frauenliga, where she spent two seasons before returning to Serie A in 2011, with Calcio Chiasiellis.

== International career ==
She is also member of the Slovenia women's national football team.
