= ASD Pink Sport Time =

Women's football (soccer) club in Italy

Pink Bari
- Full name: Associazione Sportiva Dilettantistica Pink Sport Time
- Founded: 2001; 25 years ago
- Ground: Stadio Antonio Antonucci, Bitetto
- Capacity: 600
- President: Alessandra Signorile
- Manager: Cristiana Mitola
- League: Serie B
- 2021–2022: 10th
- Website: https://www.pinkbari.it/
Home colours

Associazione Sportiva Dilettantistica Pink Sport Time, also known as Pink Bari, is a professional women's football team from Bari in southern Italy. It was founded in 2001 and competes in Serie A.

In August 2015, the club established firmer links with local men's club F.C. Bari 1908. The agreement was never fully realised and broke down completely in early 2018, amidst recriminations, as the male club teetered on the brink of financial collapse.

== Players ==
=== Current squad ===
As of 27 August 2020.

Note: Flags indicate national team as defined under FIFA eligibility rules; some limited exceptions apply. Players may hold more than one non-FIFA nationality.

No.	Pos.	Nation	Player
2	DF	ITA	Angela Mascia
4	DF	ITA	Martina Di Bari
5	DF	ITA	Antonella Marrone
6	DF	ENG	Danielle Lea
7	MF	ITA	Lucia Strisciuglio
8	MF	NOR	Marthe Enlid
9	FW	SVN	Sara Ketiš
10	FW	ITA	Noemi Manno
12	MF	SWE	Emelie Helmvall

No.	Pos.	Nation	Player
13	DF	ITA	Rossella Larenza
17	FW	NGA	Rofiat Sule
18	MF	ITA	Ludovica Silvioni
21	MF	ITA	Lucia Ceci
22	FW	ITA	Elisa Carravetta
23	DF	ITA	Francesca Soro (Captain)
29	DF	ITA	Francesca Quazzico
30	DF	ENG	Chelsea Weston
31	GK	ITA	Rebecca Difronzo
—	FW	LVA	Renāte Fedotova
