= Sabina Wölbitsch =

Swiss footballer (born 1966)

Personal information
- Full name: Sabina Wölbitsch
- Date of birth: 27 March 1966 (age 60)
- Place of birth: Zürich, Switzerland
- Positions: Defender; midfielder

Senior career*
Years	Team	Apps	(Gls)
1982–1989	SV Seebach		
1989–1990	Reggiana		
1990–1992	DFC Bern		
1992–1996	TuS Niederkirchen		
1996–1997	TuS Ahrbach	0	(0)
1997–2000	FSV Frankfurt		

International career^{‡}
1986–1994	Switzerland	34	(0)
- * Club domestic league appearances and goals as of 14:08, 14 June 2022 (UTC) ‡ National team caps and goals as of 14:08, 14 June 2022 (UTC)

Sabina Wölbitsch (born 27 March 1966) is a Swiss former footballer who played 34 times for the Switzerland national football team between 1986 and 1994. At club level she represented clubs in Switzerland, Italy, and Germany.

== Club career ==
After a successful spell with SV Seebach, which included winning two "Doubles", Wölbitsch joined Italian Serie A club Reggiana on a professional contract in 1989. She won the league title in her first season but left after a year to return to the Swiss Nationalliga A with DFC Bern.

In March 1992 Wölbitsch signed for TuS Niederkirchen of the German Frauen-Bundesliga. Initially she continued working in Switzerland and commuted to training and matches in Germany. The team won the league in 1992–93. In 1996 Wölbitsch wanted to transfer to TuS Ahrbach, but Niederkirchen refused to release her and she missed the entire season. She finished her career with FSV Frankfurt.

== International career ==
Wölbitsch won her first cap for Switzerland in a 3–1 friendly win over Iceland at Valbjarnarvöllur, Reykjavík, on 21 August 1986. She made her 34th and final national team appearance on 4 May 1994, in a 1–1 UEFA Women's Euro 1995 qualifying draw with Croatia at Stadion Kranjčevićeva, Zagreb.

== Honours ==
=== Club ===
SV Seebach

- Nationalliga A: 1983, 1985, 1987, 1988
- Swiss Women's Cup: 1986, 1987, 1988, 1989

Reggiana

- Serie A: 1990

DFC Bern

- Swiss Women's Cup: 1991

TuS Niederkirchen

- Frauen-Bundesliga: 1992–93
