= Réka Jakab =

Hungarian footballer

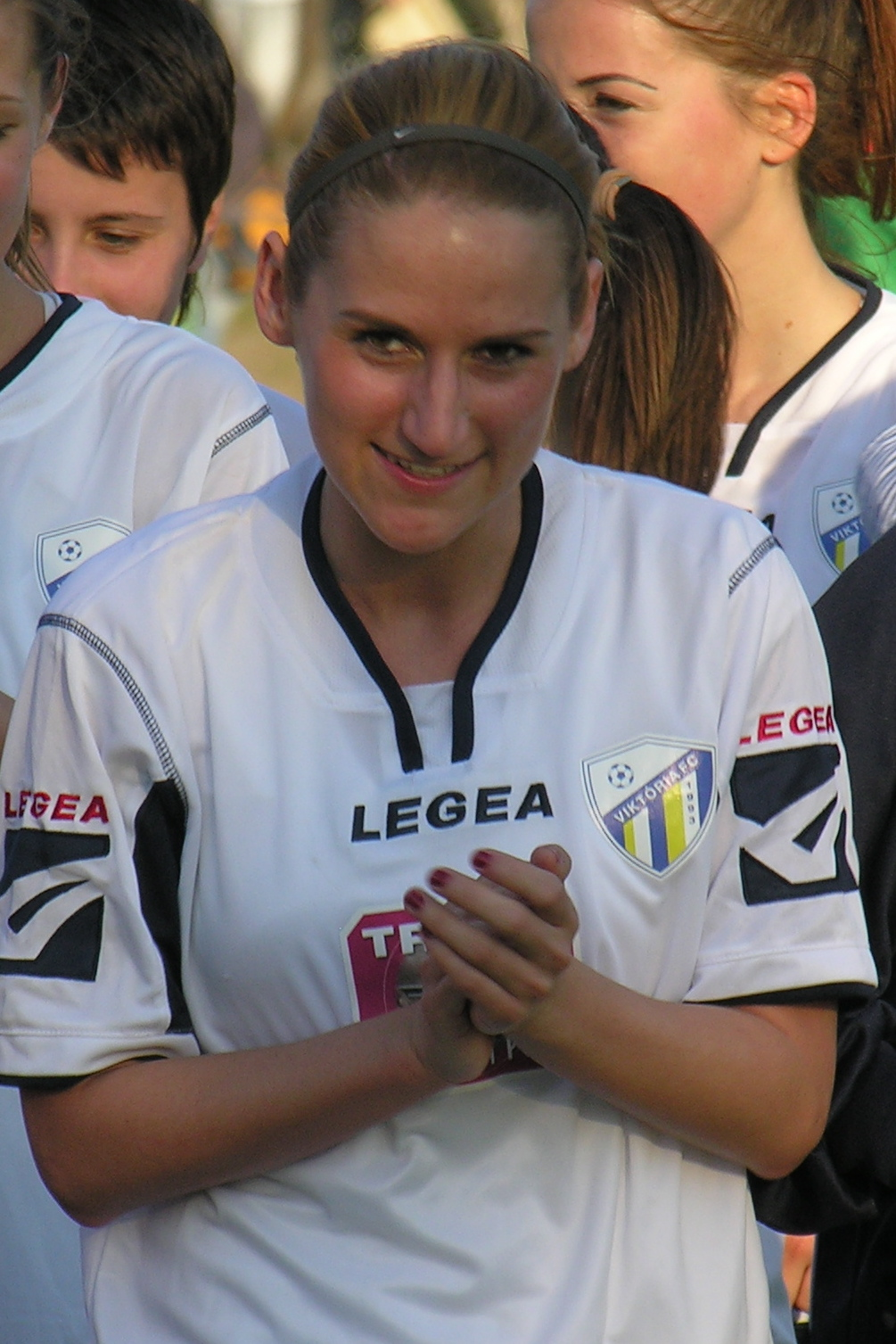

Personal information
- Full name: Réka Jakab
- Date of birth: 5 February 1987 (age 39)
- Place of birth: Győr, Hungary
- Position: Midfielder

Senior career*
Years	Team	Apps	(Gls)
2000–2007	Győri Dózsa	103	(75)
2007–2008	1. FC Femina	28	(19)
2008–	Győri Dózsa		

International career^{‡}
2005–	Hungary	29	(7)
- * Club domestic league appearances and goals ‡ National team caps and goals as of 23 November 2011

Réka Jakab (born 5 February 1987 in Győr) is a Hungarian football midfielder, currently playing for Győri Dózsa in Női NB I. She has also played for 1. FC Femina, with whom she took part in the 2007-08 UEFA Women's Cup. She is a member of the Hungarian national team.
