= Fatoumata Baldé =

Senegalese footballer (born 1993)

Personal information
- Date of birth: 7 March 1993 (age 33)
- Place of birth: Kamsar, Guinea
- Height: 1.67 m (5 ft 6 in)
- Position: Forward

Team information
- Current team: Strasbourg
- Number: 11

Senior career*
| Years | Team | Apps | (Gls) |
| 2011–2013 | ESOF La Roche-sur-Yon | 18 | (16) |
| 2013–2015 | Guingamp | 35 | (6) |
| 2015–2016 | ESOF La Roche-sur-Yon | 7 | (0) |
| 2017–2018 | Orvault Sports Football | | |
| 2017–2019 | Dijon | 29 | (9) |
| 2019–2020 | Nantes | 16 | (7) |
| 2020–2021 | Orléans | 5 | (1) |
| 2021–2024 | Nice | 59 | (28) |
| 2024– | Strasbourg | 4 | (0) |

International career^{‡}
| 2024 | France (futsal) | 2 | (0) |
| 2024– | Senegal | 2 | (0) |
- * Club domestic league appearances and goals as of 7 May 2025 ‡ National team caps and goals as of 12 July 2024

Fatoumata Baldé (born 7 March 1993) is a professional footballer who plays as a forward for Première Ligue club Strasbourg. Born in Guinea, she represents Senegal at international level.

== Career ==
The daughter of former vice president of the Guinean Football Federation Alpha Tata Baldé, Fatoumata Baldé was born in the Guinean port city of Kamsar on March 7, 1993, where she played active soccer and tennis. She started a career with DH Atlantique, joining them at the beginning of the 2008/2009 season and then Rezé Football Club in France. In their first season they won the regional division league and she was named the best player in her team. At the beginning of the 2010/2011 season, she announced her departure from FC Rezé to play the French championship by signing up with ESOF La Roche-sur-Yon.

Fatoumata Baldé made an appearance on September 5, 2010, when she came on as a substitute for Nathalie Serot against ASJ Soyaux for La Roche. They came in the second highest on the league table.

In the summer of 2012 she moved completely into the first squad of her team and scored five goals for La Roche-sur-Yon in ten games. In the summer of 2013, she joined En Avant de Guingamp.
