= Snežana Maleševič =

Slovenian footballer

Personal information
- Full name: Snežana Maleševič
- Date of birth: 30 October 1985 (age 41)
- Positions: Defender; midfielder

Senior career*
Years	Team	Apps	(Gls)
- ŽNK Jarše
- ŽNK Krka
2007–2009	Chiasiellis	35	(1)
2010–2014	Millwall Lionesses		

International career
- Slovenia
- * Club domestic league appearances and goals

Snežana Maleševič (born 10 October 1985) is a Slovenian international footballer. She played for English FA Women's Premier League club Millwall Lionesses.
