= Charlotte Lorgeré =

French footballer (born 1994)

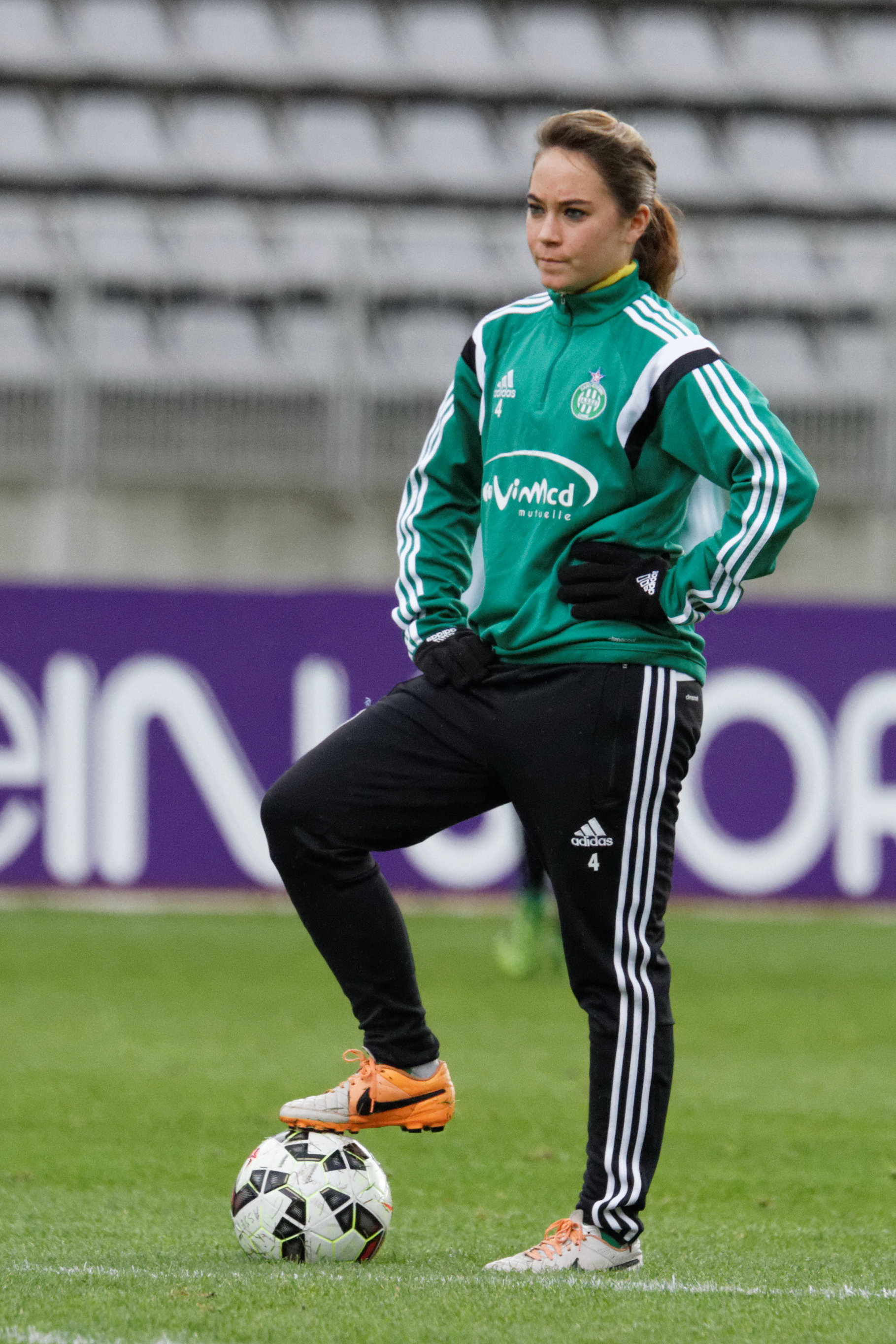
- Lorgeré in 2014

Personal information
- Date of birth: 25 August 1994 (age 32)
- Place of birth: Pabu, France
- Height: 1.65 m (5 ft 5 in)
- Position: Defender

Youth career
- 2008–2009: Quimper
- 2009: Perpignan
- 2011–2012: Saint-Étienne

Senior career*
Years	Team	Apps	(Gls)
2010	Stade Briochin	6	(0)
2010–2011	Toulouse	19	(1)
2011–2015	Saint-Étienne	51	(1)
2015–2019	Guingamp	78	(1)
2019–2020	Metz	1	(0)
2020–2023	Nantes	46	(2)
2023–2024	Lens	16	(0)

International career^{‡}
2009–2010	France U16	6	(0)
2009–2011	France U17	16	(0)
2011–2013	France U19	16	(0)
2014	France U20	1	(0)
2017	France	1	(0)
- * Club domestic league appearances and goals as of 21 July 2024 (UTC) ‡ National team caps and goals as of 7 April 2019

Charlotte Lorgeré (born 25 August 1994) is a French footballer who plays as a defender. She has been a member of the France national team.

== Career ==
Lorgeré made her league debut against Rodez on 11 September 2011. She scored her first league goal against Yzeure Allier on 13 April 2013, scoring in the 90th+2nd minute.

On 27 May 2015, Lorgeré was announced at Guingamp, signing a two-year contract. She made her league debut against Soyaux on 30 August 2015. Lorgeré scored her first league goal against VGA Saint-Maur, scoring in the 51st minute. On 26 June 2016, she signed a three-year contract extension with Guingamp.

On 5 June 2019, Lorgeré was announced at Metz on a one-year contract. Due to her injury, she was only able to play once for Metz.

On 29 May 2020, Lorgeré was announced at Nantes.

On 27 July 2023, Lorgeré was announced at Lens. She left the club on 24 July 2024.

== International career ==
Lorgeré was called up to the France senior squad for the first time in September 2017 for friendlies against Chile and Spain. She would make her international debut a month later, against Ghana on 23 October 2017.

In 2016, Lorgeré was called up to the Military Women's Football World Cup. She was part of the team that won the 2016 World Cup.

In March 2019, during the Turkish Women's Cup final between France B and Romania, Lorgeré suffered a torn cruciate ligament injury.

== Personal life ==
Lorgeré went viral after covering a song by Adele, and did an unissued duet with Corneille. She has also worked with Canal+, doing coverage at the 2019 FIFA Women's World Cup.

Lorgeré was a consultant for France Télévisions during the 2023 FIFA Women's World Cup.
