= Orobica =

Italian breed of goat

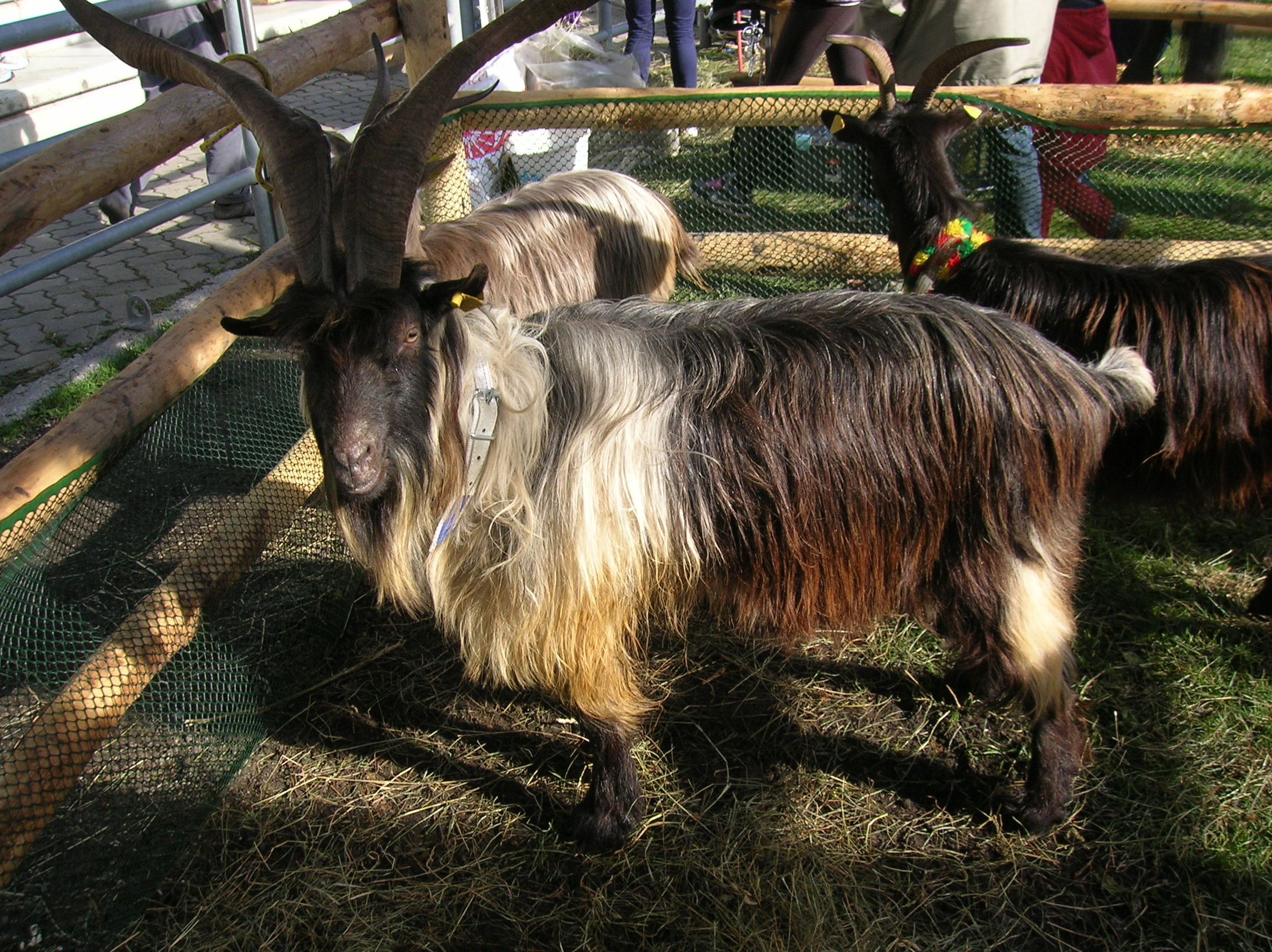
- Conservation status: FAO (2007): not at risk; DAD-IS (2025): at risk/endangered-maintained
- Other names: Valgerola
- Country of origin: Italy
- Distribution: Province of Sondrio; Province of Bergamo; Province of Como; Province of Lecco
- Standard: MIPAAF (LG); MIPAAF (RA)
- Use: milk

Traits
- Weight: Male: 80 kg; Female: 65 kg
- Height: Male: 79 cm; Female: 73 cm
- Horn status: billies always horned, nannies occasionally hornless
- Goat; Capra aegagrus hircus

The Orobica or Valgerola is an Italian breed of domestic goat from the Val Gerola in the province of Sondrio, in the Bergamo Alps of northern Italy. It is raised in the Val Gerola and the Valchiavenna in the province of Sondrio, in the Alto Lario Occidentale, the Valsassina and the Val Varrone in the province of Como, and in the upper Val Brembana in the Province of Bergamo. The origins of the breed are unknown; it is first documented at the beginning of the twentieth century. The Orobica is one of the eight autochthonous Italian goat breeds for which a genealogical herd-book is kept by the Associazione Nazionale della Pastorizia, the Italian national association of sheep-breeders.

At the end of 2013 the registered population was 1109.

== Characteristics ==
The Orobica is of medium size; billies weigh on average 80 kg, nannies about 65 kg; average heights are 79 cm and 73 cm respectively. Both sexes have long twisted horns and erect ears. The coat is of fine lustrous hair; it is long over the whole body, particularly over the rump and thighs. Four principal coat colours are recognised: camosch or chamois, dark with mixed red, white and black hairs and darker head; farinel, flour-coloured, varying from uniform ash-grey to violet-beige; marin, with white foreparts and dark hind parts, similar to the colouration of the Peacock Goat of Switzerland; and nigru, black with smoky brown tints.

== The Valgerola ==
For reasons that were not clear, the Valgerola, while always described as a synonym of the Orobica, was separately reported to DAD-IS in 2014, and was included in the list of goat breeds of limited distribution of the Ministero delle Politiche Agricole Alimentari e Forestali, the Italian ministry of agriculture. Numbers were reported by the Associazione Nazionale della Pastorizia, but no data had ever been entered. There were two official breed standards, one for the "Razza Orobica" and the other for the "Orobica o Valgerola".
