= Virva Junkkari =

Finnish footballer (born 1977)

Personal information
- Date of birth: 14 October 1977 (age 49)
- Position: Goalkeeper

International career
Years	Team	Apps	(Gls)
	Finland	15	(0)

Virva Junkkari (born 14 October 1977) is a Finnish footballer who plays as a goalkeeper. Junkkari represented the Finnish women's national football team, 15 times. Virva Junkkari greatest achievement was winning Serie A with S.S. Lazio.

== International career ==
Junkkari was also part of the Finnish team at the 2005 European Championships.

== Honours ==
=== Club ===
Lazio

- Serie A : 2002
