= Danielle Lea =

English footballer

Personal information
- Date of birth: 10 August 1994 (age 32)
- Height: 1.63 m (5 ft 4 in)
- Position: Defender

Danielle Lea (born 10 August 1994) is an English football player who plays for the Italian side A.S.D. Pink Sport Time. Lea has previously played for London Bees and Liverpool.
