= Mina Bergersen =

Norwegian footballer (born 2003)

Personal information
- Birth name: Mina Schaathun Bergersen
- Date of birth: July 10, 2003 (age 23)
- Place of birth: Horten, Norway
- Position: Midfielder

Team information
- Current team: Como (on loan from Roma)
- Number: 6

Youth career
- –2018: Borre
- 2020: Sandefjord

Senior career*
Years	Team	Apps	(Gls)
2018–2019	Borre	16	(10)
2020	Sandefjord	0	(0)
2021	Øvrevoll Hosle	3	(0)
2021–	Roma	5	(1)
2023–	→ Como	0	(0)

International career^{‡}
2022	Norway U19	1	(0)
2024–	Norway U23	2	(0)
- * Club domestic league appearances and goals as of 16:55, 19 September 2023 (UTC) ‡ National team caps and goals as of 28 November 2024

Mina Schaathun Bergersen (born 10 July 2003) is a Norwegian footballer who plays as a midfielder for Serie A club Como, on loan from AS Roma. In January 2022, Bergersen scored on debut for Roma.

== Honours ==
AS Roma

- Serie A: 2022–23
