= Dominika Čonč =

Slovenian footballer (born 1993)

Personal information
- Date of birth: 1 January 1993 (age 33)
- Place of birth: Maribor, Slovenia
- Height: 1.66 m (5 ft 5 in)
- Position: Midfielder

Team information
- Current team: Como 1907
- Number: 17

Youth career
- Železničar Maribor
- Maribor

College career
Years	Team	Apps	(Gls)
2011–2014	UT Martin Skyhawks	85	(12)

Senior career*
Years	Team	Apps	(Gls)
2008–2010	Maribor	43	(13)
2010	Krka	9	(4)
2011–2015	Maribor	19	(15)
2015	Pomurje	11	(7)
2016	Maribor	9	(4)
2016–2017	Fortuna Hjørring	1	(0)
2017–2018	Espanyol	28	(2)
2018–2019	Málaga	30	(2)
2019–2021	AC Milan	26	(6)
2021–2022	Valencia	13	(0)
2022–2023	Sampdoria	27	(1)
2023–2024	Levante Badalona	25	(0)
2024–2025	FC Como	21	(0)
2025–	Como 1907		

International career^{‡}
2008	Slovenia U17	6	(0)
2008–2010	Slovenia U19	6	(6)
2010–	Slovenia	99	(5)
- * Club domestic league appearances and goals as of 7 August 2025 ‡ National team caps and goals as of 13 October 2026

Dominika Čonč (born 1 January 1993) is a Slovenian professional footballer who plays as a midfielder for Italian Serie A Women club Como 1907 and the Slovenia national team.
