= Mady Solow =

Polish footballer

Personal information
- Full name: Madison Sarah Solow
- Date of birth: 30 March 1992 (age 34)
- Place of birth: Toronto, Ontario, Canada
- Height: 1.65 m (5 ft 5 in)
- Position: Midfielder

Team information
- Current team: Agia Paraskevi
- Number: 24

Youth career
- 2005: Vaughan Road Vipers
- 2006–2009: IMG Academy

College career
Years	Team	Apps	(Gls)
2010	Florida Gators	2	(0)
2011–2013	UC Irvine Anteaters	57	(3)

Senior career*
Years	Team	Apps	(Gls)
2013	ANB Futbol		
2014	Toronto Lady Lynx		
2015	Thróttur Reykjavík	11	(1)
2015–2018	Chievo Verona	75	(10)
2018–2019	Basel	27	(5)
2019–2021	Hellas Verona	48	(3)
2021–2022	Dux Logroño	32	(0)
2022–2023	London Seaward	8	(2)
2024–	Agia Paraskevi	5	(1)

International career
2015	Poland	4	(0)
- * Club domestic league appearances and goals as of 27 December 2024

Madison Sarah "Mady" Solow (born 30 March 1992) is a footballer who plays as a midfielder for Agia Paraskevi in the Greek A Division. Born in Canada, she represented the Poland women's national team.

== Early life ==
Solow was born and raised in Toronto, Ontario.

== College career ==
Solow has attended the University of Florida and the University of California, Irvine in the United States.

== Club career ==
Solow has played for Thróttur Reykjavík in Iceland and for Chievo Verona and Hellas Verona in Italy.

== International career ==
Solow capped for Poland four times at senior level during the UEFA Women's Euro 2017 qualifying.

== Career statistics ==
=== International ===
Appearances and goals by national team and year
National team	Year	Apps	Goals
Poland	2015	4	0
Total		4	0
