= Slovenia women's national football team =

Women's national association football team representing Slovenia

Slovenia
- Association: Football Association of Slovenia
- Confederation: UEFA (Europe)
- Head coach: Saša Kolman
- Captain: Mateja Zver
- Most caps: Mateja Zver (127)
- Top scorer: Mateja Zver (56)
- FIFA code: SVN
| First colours | Second colours |

FIFA ranking
- Current: 36 ▲2 (20 October 2026)
- Highest: 38 (March – December 2025)
- Lowest: 77 (June 2005)

First international
- Slovenia 0–10 England (Ljubljana, Slovenia; 25 September 1993)

Biggest win
- Macedonia 0–9 Slovenia (Skopje, Macedonia; 3 June 2016); Estonia 0–9 Slovenia (Tallinn, Estonia; 23 February 2021)

Biggest defeat
- Spain 17–0 Slovenia (Palamós, Spain; 20 March 1994)

The Slovenia women's national football team (Slovene: Slovenska ženska nogometna reprezentanca) represents Slovenia in international women's football and is controlled by the Football Association of Slovenia, the governing body for football in Slovenia. The team played its first official match in 1993, two years after the country gained independence from Yugoslavia. Before that, Slovenian players played for the Yugoslavia national team.

== History ==
Slovenia made its official debut on 25 September 1993 against England in the qualifying for the 1995 European Championship. They lost all six qualifiers with a 0–60 goal average, including a record 17–0 loss against Spain. After this Slovenia did not take part in official competitions for more than a decade.

They returned in 2005 for the 2007 World Cup qualification, where they did not have options to qualify since back then a two-division format with promotions and relegations was held and they started in the lower category. For the 2009 European Championship the two divisions were merged into one, and Slovenia made it to the play-offs as one of the four best 3rd-ranked teams, their biggest success to date. There they were knocked out by Ukraine by a 0–5 aggregate.

In the 2011 World Cup and 2013 European Championship qualifiers Slovenia ended fourth out of five teams, with 6 and 4 points, respectively.

== All-time results ==
| Competition | Stage | Opponent | Result | Scorers |
|---|---|---|---|---|
| 1995 UEFA Euro qualification | First stage | England; Belgium; Spain | 0–10; 0–10; 0–7; 0–8; 0–17; 0–8 | |
| 2007 FIFA World Cup; UEFA qualification | Regular stage (Class B) | Bosnia and Herzegovina; Croatia; Malta | 2–0; 6–1; 5–3; 3–0; 4–1; 3–1 | Nikl 3, Milenkovič 2, Vais 2, Petrovič; Vais 5, Milenkovič, Nikl, Zver; Maleševič 2, Nikl 2, Vais 2, Grad |
| 2009 UEFA Euro qualification | First stage | Serbia; France; Iceland; Greece | 0–5; 3–0; 0–6; 0–2; 2–1; 0–5; 3–1; 6–4 | Zver 3 Benak, Milenkovič; Zver 4, Milkovič 2, Benak, Maleševič, Petrovič |
| 2009 UEFA Euro qualification | Play-offs | Ukraine | 0–3; 0–2 | |
| 2011 FIFA World Cup; UEFA qualification | First stage | Italy; Finland; Armenia; Portugal | 0–8; 0–6; 0–3; 1–4; 5–1; 1–0; 0–4; 0–1 | Zver; Milenkovič 2, Zver 2, Tibaut, Vrabel |
| 2013 UEFA Euro qualification | First stage | England; Serbia; Croatia; Netherlands | 0–4; 0–4; 1–2; 0–3; 3–3; 1–0; 0–2; 1–3 | o.g. Eržen, Vrabel, Žganec; Zver |
| 2015 FIFA World Cup; UEFA qualification | First stage | Slovakia; Germany; Republic of Ireland; Russia; Croatia | 3–1; 2–1; 0–13; 0–4; 0–3; 0–2; 1–4; 1–2; 0–3; 0–1 | Nikl 2, Zver 2, + o.g. Jerina 2 |

== Results and fixtures ==
The following is a list of match results in the last 12 months, as well as any future matches that have been scheduled.

Legend

Win Draw Loss Fixture

=== 2025 ===
| 28 November Friendly | Poland | 1–0 | Slovenia | Gdańsk, Poland |
| 18:00 | Zawistowska 17' | | | Stadium: Polsat Plus Arena Gdańsk |

=== 2026 ===
| 3 March 2027 FIFA Women's World Cup qualification | Germany | 5–0 | Slovenia | Dresden, Germany |
| 17:45 | Endemann 6'; Senß 12'; Dallmann 48'; Mühlhaus 53'; Schüller 71' | Report (FIFA); Report (UEFA) | | Stadium: Rudolf-Harbig-Stadion; Attendance: 19,169; Referee: Eleni Antoniou (Greece) |

| 7 March 2027 FIFA Women's World Cup qualification | Slovenia | 1–0 | Austria | Koper, Slovenia |
| | Kramžar 21' | Report (FIFA); Report (UEFA) | | Stadium: Bonifika Stadium; Attendance: 543; Referee: Hristiyana Guteva (Bulgaria) |

| 14 April 2027 FIFA Women's World Cup qualification | Norway | 5–0 | Slovenia | Oslo, Norway |
| 18:00 | Hegerberg 45+2', 88'; Blakstad 69'; Graham Hansen 76'; Sævik 86' | Report (FIFA); Report (UEFA) | | Stadium: Ullevaal Stadion; Attendance: 3,658; Referee: Martina Molinaro (Italy) |

| 18 April 2027 FIFA Women's World Cup qualification | Slovenia | 2–3 | Norway | Ptuj, Slovenia |
| 17:00 | Zver 43', 70' (pen.) | Report (FIFA); Report (UEFA) | Hegerberg 36'; Jensen 66'; Gaupset 90+2' | Stadium: Ptuj City Stadium; Attendance: 631; Referee: Rasa Grigonė (Lithuania) |

| 5 June 2027 FIFA Women's World Cup qualification | Austria | 1–0 | Slovenia | Vienna |
| 18:00 | Naschenweng 54' | Report (FIFA); Report (UEFA) | | Stadium: Sportclub-Platz Dornbach; Attendance: 3,350; Referee: Olatz Rivera Olmedo (Spain) |

| 9 June 2027 FIFA Women's World Cup qualification | Slovenia | 0–2 | Germany | Ljubljana |
| 18:00 | | Report (FIFA); Report (UEFA) | Prašnikar 39' (o.g.); Martinez 50' | Stadium: Stožice Stadium; Attendance: 3,000; Referee: Michalina Diakow (Poland) |

| 9 October 2026 2027 FIFA Women's World Cup qualification | Turkey | 3–3 | Slovenia | Istanbul |
| 18:00 (19:00 UTC+3) | Hançar 18'; Altunkulak 25', 75' | Report (FIFA); Report (UEFA) | Kajzba 62', 90+3'; Kastelec 81' | Stadium: Pendik Stadium; Attendance: 874; Referee: Lina Lehtovaara (Finland) |

| 13 October 2026 2027 FIFA Women's World Cup qualification | Slovenia | 2–0 | Turkey | Domžale |
| 17:00 | Sternad 83'; Kastelec 90+3' | Report (FIFA); Report (UEFA) | | Stadium: Domžale Sports Park; Referee: Maria Eugenia Gil Soriano (Spain) |

| November 2027 FIFA Women's World Cup qualification | Slovenia | v | Netherlands | Slovenia |

| December 2027 FIFA Women's World Cup qualification | Netherlands | v | Slovenia | Netherlands |

== Coaching staff ==
=== Current coaching staff ===
| Position | Name | Ref. |
|---|---|---|
| Head coach | Saša Kolman | |

=== Manager history ===
As of February 2024

| Name | Period | Matches | Wins | Draws | Losses | Winning % | Notes |
|---|---|---|---|---|---|---|---|
| Saša Kolman | 2023 – | 0 | 0 | 0 | 0 | 00.0% | |
| Borut Jarc | 2018–2023 | 0 | 0 | 0 | 0 | 00.0% | |

== Players ==
=== Current squad ===
The following players were called up for the 2027 FIFA Women's World Cup qualification matches against Austria and Germany on 5 and 9 June 2026, respectively.

Caps and goals correct as of 9 June 2026, after the match against Germany.

| No. | Pos. | Player | Date of birth (age) | Caps | Goals | Club |
|---|---|---|---|---|---|---|
| 1 | GK | Zala Meršnik | 6 July 2001 (age 25) | 71 | 0 | (Saudi Arabian Football Federation) Al-Ittihad |
| 12 | GK | Iva Kocijan | 10 May 2004 (age 22) | 0 | 0 | (Football Association of Slovenia) Radomlje |
| 22 | GK | Melania Pasar | 18 October 1999 (age 27) | 3 | 0 | (Austrian Football Association) LASK |
| 2 | DF | Lana Golob | 26 October 1999 (age 27) | 53 | 4 | (Scottish Football Association) Glasgow City |
| 3 | DF | Sara Agrež | 9 December 2000 (age 25) | 59 | 3 | (German Football Association) 1. FC Köln |
| 4 | DF | Chantal Kirtzakis | 17 July 2004 (age 22) | 1 | 0 | (Hellenic Football Federation) Atromitos |
| 5 | DF | Neža Trost | 27 October 2007 (age 19) | 0 | 0 | (Football Association of Slovenia) Ljubljana |
| 10 | DF | Dominika Čonč | 1 January 1993 (age 33) | 97 | 5 | (Italian Football Federation) Como 1907 |
| 14 | DF | Tinkara Testen | 13 January 2006 (age 20) | 6 | 0 | (Portuguese Football Federation) Benfica |
| 16 | DF | Kaja Eržen | 21 August 1994 (age 32) | 110 | 4 | (Italian Football Federation) Ternana |
| 17 | DF | Izabela Križaj | 11 May 2000 (age 26) | 37 | 0 | (Austrian Football Association) St. Pölten |
| 19 | DF | Živa Rakovec | 17 July 2005 (age 21) | 1 | 0 | (Football Association of Slovenia) Mura |
| 6 | MF | Kaja Korošec | 17 November 2001 (age 25) | 69 | 7 | (French Football Federation) Paris FC |
| 8 | MF | Mateja Zver (captain) | 15 March 1988 (age 38) | 127 | 56 | (Turkish Football Federation) Ankara BB Fomget |
| 9 | MF | Mirjam Kastelec | 10 September 2002 (age 24) | 20 | 2 | (Football Association of Slovenia) Ljubljana |
| 11 | MF | Lara Prašnikar | 8 August 1998 (age 28) | 94 | 48 | (German Football Association) VfL Wolfsburg |
| 15 | MF | Jona Javorič | 31 December 2006 (age 19) | 0 | 0 | (Football Association of Slovenia) Radomlje |
| 18 | MF | Sara Ketiš | 16 September 1996 (age 30) | 14 | 0 | (Italian Football Federation) Lumezzane |
| 21 | MF | Adrijana Mori | 17 August 2000 (age 26) | 25 | 3 | (German Football Association) Turbine Potsdam |
| 7 | FW | Nina Kajzba | 4 April 2004 (age 22) | 31 | 4 | (Royal Belgian Football Association) Standard de Liège |
| 13 | FW | Zala Kuštrin | 18 June 1998 (age 28) | 37 | 4 | (Austrian Football Association) Sturm Graz |
| 20 | FW | Zara Kramžar | 10 January 2006 (age 20) | 29 | 10 | (The Football Association) Everton |
| 23 | FW | Maja Sternad | 28 December 2003 (age 22) | 18 | 2 | (German Football Association) Werder Bremen |

=== Recent call-ups ===
The following players have also been called up to the squad within the past 12 months.

| Pos. | Player | Date of birth (age) | Caps | Goals | Club | Latest call-up |
|---|---|---|---|---|---|---|
| GK | Sara Nemet | 6 February 1998 (age 28) | 1 | 0 | (Slovenia) Mura | v. Austria, 7 March 2026 |
| DF | Zala Vindišar | 31 May 2000 (age 26) | 5 | 2 | (Slovenia) Mura | v. Norway, 18 April 2026 |
| DF | Ajda Zajc | 17 February 2007 (age 19) | 0 | 0 | (Slovenia) Radomlje | v. Norway, 18 April 2026 |
| DF | Sara Gradišek | 16 July 2003 (age 23) | 20 | 0 | (Slovenia) Radomlje | v. Austria, 7 March 2026 |
| MF | Lea Dolinar | 12 March 2005 (age 21) | 2 | 0 | (Slovenia) Mura | v. Norway, 18 April 2026 |
| MF | Korina Janež | 25 February 2004 (age 22) | 27 | 1 | (Germany) Union Berlin | v. Austria, 7 March 2026 |
| MF | Naja Mihelič | 17 August 2006 (age 20) | 7 | 0 | (Italy) Sassuolo | v. Austria, 7 March 2026 |
| FW | Eva Križan | 2 June 2007 (age 19) | 0 | 0 | (Slovenia) Radomlje | v. Austria, 7 March 2026 |
Notes: ^{INJ} = Withdrew due to injury; ^{RET} = Retired from the national team

=== Captains ===
- Mateja Zver (????–)

== Records ==
As of 9 June 2026

Players in bold are still active with the national team.

=== Most appearances ===
| Rank | Player | Career | Caps | Goals |
|---|---|---|---|---|
| 1 | **Mateja Zver** | 2007–present | 127 | 56 |
| 2 | **Kaja Eržen** | 2012–present | 110 | 4 |
| 3 | **Dominika Čonč** | 2010–present | 97 | 5 |
| 4 | **Lara Prašnikar** | 2015–present | 94 | 49 |
| 5 | **Špela Kolbl** | 2013–present | 79 | 10 |
| 6 | **Zala Meršnik** | 2017–present | 71 | 0 |
| 7 | **Kaja Korošec** | 2017–present | 69 | 7 |
| 8 | Kristina Erman | 2010–2023 | 68 | 4 |
| 9 | Tjaša Tibaut | 2007–2017 | 63 | 11 |
| 10 | Sara Agrež | 2017–present | 59 | 3 |

=== Top goalscorers ===
| Rank | Player | Career | Goals | Caps | Avg. |
|---|---|---|---|---|---|
| 1 | **Mateja Zver** | 2007–present | 56 | 127 | 0.44 |
| 2 | **Lara Prašnikar** | 2015–present | 49 | 94 | 0.52 |
| 3 | Tjaša Tibaut | 2007–2017 | 11 | 63 | 0.17 |
| 4 | **Zara Kramžar** | 2022–present | 10 | 29 | 0.34 |
| 4 | **Špela Kolbl** | 2013–present | 10 | 79 | 0.13 |
| 6 | **Kaja Korošec** | 2017–present | 7 | 69 | 0.10 |
| 7 | Anja Milenkovič | 2002–2015 | 6 | 47 | 0.13 |
| 7 | **Lana Golob** | 2018–present | 6 | 52 | 0.12 |
| 9 | **Dominika Čonč** | 2010–present | 5 | 97 | 0.05 |
| 10 | **Nina Kajzba** | 2021–present | 4 | 31 | 0.13 |
| 10 | **Zala Kuštrin** | 2017–present | 4 | 37 | 0.11 |
| 10 | **Kaja Eržen** | 2012–present | 4 | 110 | 0.04 |

== Competitive record ==
=== FIFA Women's World Cup ===
| FIFA Women's World Cup record | | | | | | | | | Qualification record | | | | | | |
| Year | Result | GP | W | D* | L | GF | GA | GD | GP | W | D* | L | GF | GA | GD |
| (China) 1991 | Part of Yugoslavia | | | | | | | | Part of Yugoslavia | | | | | | |
| (Sweden) 1995 | Did not qualify | | | | | | | | UEFA Euro 1995 | | | | | | |
| (United States) 1999 | Did not enter | | | | | | | | Did not enter | | | | | | |
| (United States) 2003 | Did not enter | | | | | | | | Did not enter | | | | | | |
| (China) 2007 | Did not qualify | | | | | | | | 6 | 6 | 0 | 0 | 23 | 6 | +17 |
| (Germany) 2011 | Did not qualify | | | | | | | | 8 | 2 | 0 | 6 | 7 | 27 | −20 |
| (Canada) 2015 | Did not qualify | | | | | | | | 10 | 2 | 0 | 8 | 7 | 34 | −27 |
| (France) 2019 | Did not qualify | | | | | | | | 8 | 2 | 0 | 6 | 9 | 20 | −11 |
| (Australia) (New Zealand) 2023 | Did not qualify | | | | | | | | 10 | 5 | 3 | 2 | 21 | 6 | +15 |
| (Brazil) 2027 | To be determined | | | | | | | | To be determined | | | | | | |
| (Costa Rica) (Jamaica) (Mexico) (United States) 2031 | To be determined | | | | | | | | To be determined | | | | | | |
| (United Kingdom) 2035 | To be determined | | | | | | | | To be determined | | | | | | |
| Total | - | - | - | - | - | - | - | - | 42 | 17 | 3 | 22 | 67 | 93 | −26 |

*Draws include knockout matches decided on penalty kicks.

=== UEFA Women's Championship ===
| UEFA Women's Championship record | | | | | | | | Qualifying record | | | | | | | |
| Year | Result | Pld | W | D* | L | GF | GA | Pld | W | D* | L | GF | GA | P/R | Rnk |
| 1984 to (Denmark) 1991 | Part of Yugoslavia | | | | | | | Part of Yugoslavia | | | | | | | |
| (Italy) 1993 | Did not enter | | | | | | | Did not enter | | | | | | | |
| (England) (Germany) (Norway) (Sweden) 1995 | Did not qualify | | | | | | | 6 | 0 | 0 | 6 | 0 | 60 | – | |
| (Norway) (Sweden) 1997 | Did not enter | | | | | | | Did not enter | | | | | | | |
| (Germany) 2001 | Did not enter | | | | | | | Did not enter | | | | | | | |
| (England) 2005 | Did not enter | | | | | | | Did not enter | | | | | | | |
| (Finland) 2009 | Did not qualify | | | | | | | 10 | 4 | 0 | 6 | 14 | 29 | – | |
| (Sweden) 2013 | Did not qualify | | | | | | | 8 | 1 | 1 | 6 | 6 | 21 | – | |
| (Netherlands) 2017 | Did not qualify | | | | | | | 8 | 3 | 0 | 5 | 21 | 19 | – | |
| (England) 2022 | Did not qualify | | | | | | | 10 | 6 | 0 | 4 | 31 | 12 | – | |
| (Switzerland) 2025 | Did not qualify | | | | | | | 8 | 6 | 0 | 2 | 27 | 5 | ▲ | 33rd |
| (Germany) 2029 | To be determined | | | | | | | To be determined | | | | | | | |
| Total | – | – | – | – | – | – | – | 50 | 20 | 1 | 29 | 99 | 146 | 33rd | |

*Draws include knockout matches decided on penalty kicks.

=== UEFA Women's Nations League ===
UEFA Women's Nations League record
| Year | League | Group | Pos | Pld | W | D | L | GF | GA | P/R | Rnk |
|---|---|---|---|---|---|---|---|---|---|---|---|
| 2023–24 | B | 4 | 3rd | 6 | 1 | 3 | 2 | 4 | 9 | ▼ | 28th |
| 2025 | B | 2 | To be determined | | | | | | | | |
| Total | | | | 6 | 1 | 3 | 2 | 4 | 9 | 28th | |

| ▲ | Promoted at end of season |
| Same position | No movement at end of season |
| ▼ | Relegated at end of season |
| * | Participated in promotion/relegation play-offs |

== See also ==
- Sport in Slovenia
  - Football in Slovenia
    - Women's football in Slovenia
- Slovenia men's national football team
