= Julie Peruzzetto =

French footballer

Personal information
- Date of birth: 26 September 1982 (age 44)
- Place of birth: Carcassonne, France
- Height: 5 ft 7 in (1.69 m)
- Position: Forward

Senior career*
Years	Team	Apps	(Gls)
- Toulouse FC
- * Club domestic league appearances and goals

Julie Peruzzetto (born 26 September 1987) is a French footballer who plays as a striker for GPSO 92 Issy.
