= Julie Debever =

French footballer (born 1988)

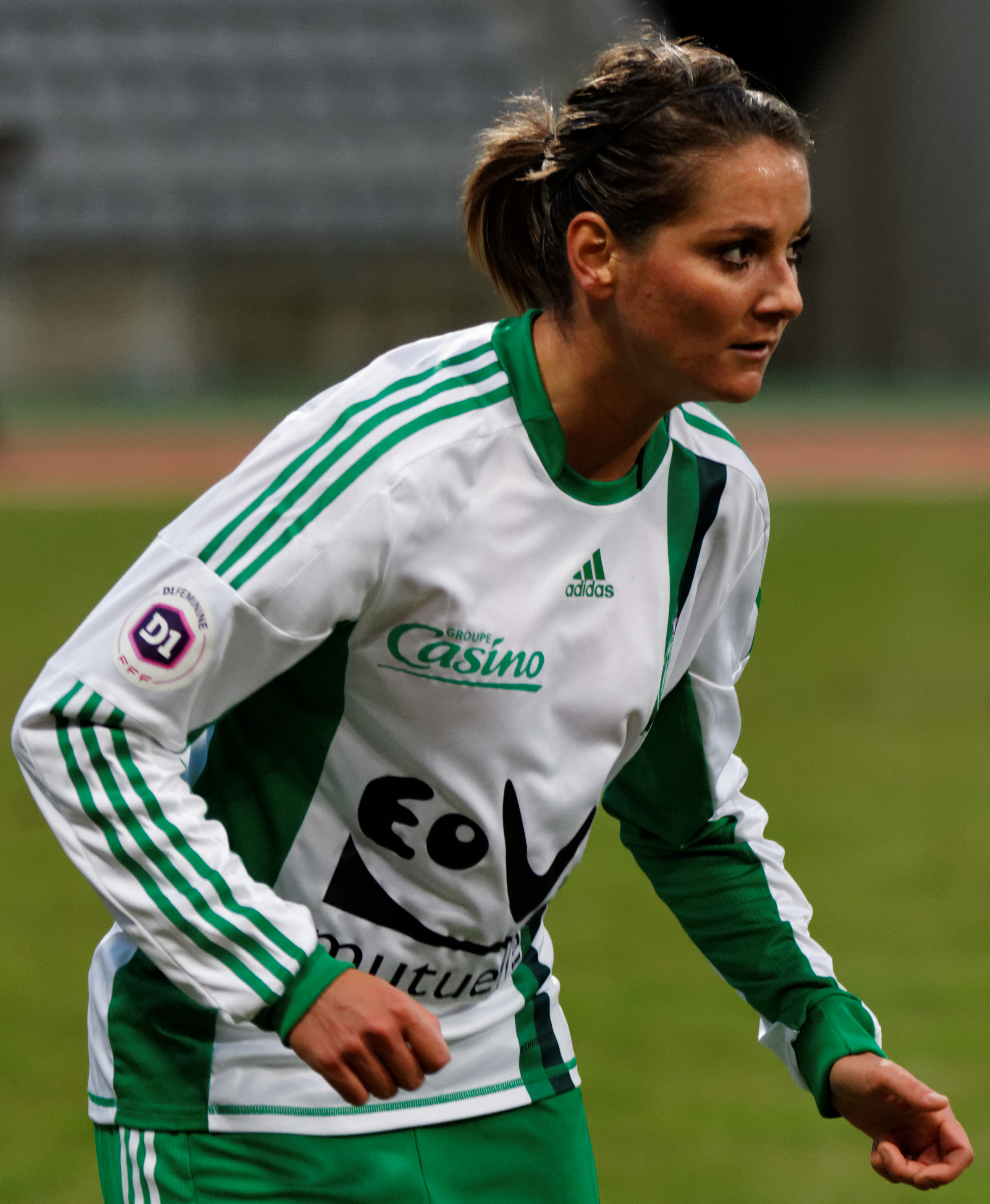
- Debever in 2012

Personal information
- Full name: Julie Martine Debever
- Date of birth: 18 May 1988 (age 38)
- Place of birth: Marcq-en-Barœul, France
- Height: 1.75 m (5 ft 9 in)
- Position: Defender

Senior career*
Years	Team	Apps	(Gls)
2001	FC La Chapelle d'Armentières		
2002–2011	FCF Hénin-Beaumont	132	(7)
2011–2012	Juvisy FCF	5	(0)
2012–2015	Saint-Etienne	43	(1)
2015–2019	Guingamp	82	(1)
2019–2021	Inter Milan	22	(2)
2021–2023	Fleury 91	25	(2)

International career^{‡}
2018–2019	France	3	(0)
- * Club domestic league appearances and goals as of 28 February 2020 ‡ National team caps and goals as of 6 June 2019

Julie Martine Debever (born 18 April 1988) is a French former professional footballer who played as a defender for the France national team. She was named in the squad for the 2019 FIFA Women's World Cup.
