= Alice Benoît =

French footballer (born 1996)

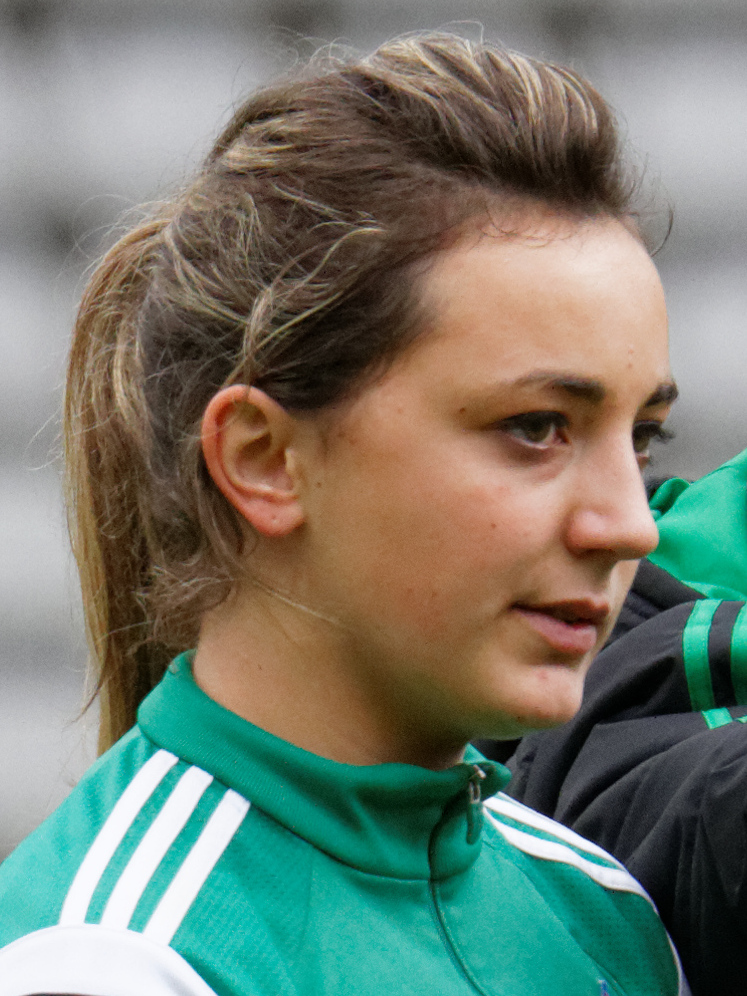
- Benoît in 2014

Personal information
- Full name: Alice Pauline Benoît
- Date of birth: 27 March 1996 (age 30)
- Place of birth: Ermont, France
- Positions: Midfielder; defender

Team information
- Current team: Lazio
- Number: 10

Senior career*
Years	Team	Apps	(Gls)
2012–2013	La Roche-sur-Yon	22	(3)
2013–2014	Soyaux	22	(0)
2014–2015	Saint-Étienne	17	(0)
2015	Guingamp	4	(0)
2016–2018	Yzeure	44	(6)
2018–2020	Paris FC	31	(0)
2020–2021	Soyaux	13	(0)
2021–2022	Sassuolo	12	(0)
2022–2023	Parma	21	(1)
2023–2024	Sampdoria	38	(0)
2024–	Lazio	16	(0)

International career
2012	France U16	2	(0)
2012–2013	France U17	9	(0)
2014	France U19	2	(0)
- * Club domestic league appearances and goals as of 05:05, 8 December 2025 (UTC)

Alice Pauline Benoît (born 27 March 1996) is a French footballer who plays as a midfielder for Italian Serie A club Lazio.
