= ŽNK MB Tabor =

MB Tabor
- Full name: Ženski nogometni klub MB Tabor
- Founded: October 2005; 20 years ago (as ŽNK Maribor)
- Dissolved: 2025; 1 year ago
- Ground: Tabor Sports Park
- Website: nkmaribortabor.si
Home colours	Away colours

Ženski nogometni klub MB Tabor or simply ŽNK MB Tabor was a Slovenian women's football team from Maribor.

== History ==
Founded in 2005 as ŽNK Maribor, the club began competing in the Slovenian Women's League in the 2006–07 season. The team ranked last and second to last in its first two seasons, but then finished third in 2009. In the next three seasons, from 2010 to 2012, they always finished in sixth place. Nina Kovačič (2007), Monika Žunkovič (2008 and 2011) and Urška Pavlec (2009 and 2010) have been the team's top scorers in its first five seasons.

In February 2019, the club merged with the men's football club NK Maribor Tabor. After the 2020–21 season, the club withdrew from the league and disbanded its senior team. After competing with only youth teams, they re-established the senior squad for the 2024–25 season.

After the 2024–25 season, MB Tabor disbanded all women's teams, and all players joined the newly founded club ŽN Maribor, based in Zlatoličje.
