= 2017–18 in German football =

Football in Germany
- Season: 2017–18

Men's football
- Bundesliga: Bayern Munich
- 2. Bundesliga: Fortuna Düsseldorf
- 3. Liga: 1. FC Magdeburg
- DFB-Pokal: Eintracht Frankfurt
- DFL-Supercup: Bayern Munich

Women's football
- Frauen-Bundesliga: VfL Wolfsburg
- DFB-Pokal: VfL Wolfsburg

The 2017–18 season was the 108th season of competitive football in Germany.

== Promotion and relegation ==
=== Pre-season ===
League	Promoted to League	Relegated from League
Bundesliga	VfB Stuttgart; Hannover 96	FC Ingolstadt; Darmstadt 98
2. Bundesliga	MSV Duisburg; Holstein Kiel; Jahn Regensburg	1860 Munich^{1}; Würzburger Kickers; Karlsruher SC
3. Liga	Carl Zeiss Jena; SV Meppen; SpVgg Unterhaching	Mainz 05 II; FSV Frankfurt
Frauen-Bundesliga	Werder Bremen; 1. FC Köln	Bayer Leverkusen; Borussia Mönchengladbach
2. Frauen-Bundesliga	TV Jahn Delmenhorst; FF USV Jena II; 1. FC Köln II; SG Andernach; SC Freiburg II	Union Berlin; Bramfelder SV; SC Sand II; SV 67 Weinberg; TSV Crailsheim

1860 Munich was relegated to the 2017–18 Regionalliga Bayern due to not being able to obtain a license for the 2017–18 3. Liga, sparing SC Paderborn from relegation from the 2016–17 3. Liga.

=== Post-season ===
League	Promoted to League	Relegated from League
Bundesliga	Fortuna Düsseldorf; 1. FC Nürnberg	Hamburger SV; 1. FC Köln
2. Bundesliga	1. FC Magdeburg; SC Paderborn	Eintracht Braunschweig; 1. FC Kaiserslautern
3. Liga	Energie Cottbus; 1860 Munich; KFC Uerdingen	Werder Bremen II; Chemnitzer FC; Rot-Weiß Erfurt
Frauen-Bundesliga	Borussia Mönchengladbach; Bayer Leverkusen	USV Jena; 1. FC Köln
2. Frauen-Bundesliga^{1}	SGS Essen II; SV Weinberg	USV Jena II; Arminia Bielefeld; SV Henstedt-Ulzburg; Jahn Delmenhorst; Blau-Weiß Hohen Neuendorf; Herforder SV; VfL Sindelfingen; Schott Mainz; SC Freiburg II; 1. FFC Niederkirchen; SG Andernach; 1. FC Köln II

The 2. Frauen-Bundesliga was restructured for the following season, changing from two divisions to one.

== National teams ==
=== Germany national football team ===
==== 2018 FIFA World Cup qualifying ====
===== 2018 FIFA World Cup qualifying UEFA Group C =====
Pos	Team	Pld	W	D	L	GF	GA	GD	Pts	Qualification
1	Germany	10	10	0	0	43	4	+39	30	Qualification to 2018 FIFA World Cup
2	Northern Ireland	10	6	1	3	17	6	+11	19	Advance to second round
3	Czech Republic	10	4	3	3	17	10	+7	15	
4	Norway	10	4	1	5	17	16	+1	13	
5	Azerbaijan	10	3	1	6	10	19	−9	10	
6	San Marino	10	0	0	10	2	51	−49	0	

Source: FIFA
Rules for classification: Qualification tiebreakers

Win Draw Loss

1 September 2017 2018 FIFA World Cup Q	Czech Republic	1–2	Germany	Prague, Czech Republic
20:45 (20:45 UTC+2)	Darida 78'	Report (FIFA); Report (UEFA)	Werner 4'; Hummels 88'	Stadium: Eden Arena; Attendance: 18,093; Referee: (Russia) Sergei Karasev

4 September 2017 2018 FIFA World Cup Q	Germany	6–0	Norway	Stuttgart, Germany
20:45 (20:45 UTC+2)	Özil 10'; Draxler 17'; Werner 21' 40'; Goretzka 50'; Gómez 79'	Report (FIFA); Report (UEFA)		Stadium: Mercedes-Benz Arena; Attendance: 53,814; Referee: (Lithuania) Gediminas Mažeika

5 October 2017 2018 FIFA World Cup Q	Northern Ireland	1–3	Germany	Belfast, Northern Ireland
20:45 (19:45 UTC+1)	Magennis 90+3'	Report (FIFA); Report (UEFA)	Rudy 2'; Wagner 21'; Kimmich 86'	Stadium: Windsor Park; Attendance: 20,000; Referee: (Netherlands) Danny Makkelie

8 October 2017 2018 FIFA World Cup Q	Germany	5–1	Azerbaijan	Kaiserslautern, Germany
20:45 (20:45 UTC+1)	Goretzka 8', 66'; Wagner 54'; Rüdiger 64'; Can 81'	Report (FIFA); Report (UEFA)	Sheydaev 34'	Stadium: Fritz-Walter-Stadion; Attendance: 37,613; Referee: (Latvia) Andris Treimanis

==== 2018 FIFA World Cup ====
===== 2018 FIFA World Cup Group F =====
Pos	Team	Pld	W	D	L	GF	GA	GD	Pts	Qualification
1	Sweden	3	2	0	1	5	2	+3	6	Advance to knockout stage
2	Mexico	3	2	0	1	3	4	−1	6	Advance to knockout stage
3	South Korea	3	1	0	2	3	3	0	3	
4	Germany	3	1	0	2	2	4	−2	3	

Source: FIFA
Rules for classification: Group stage tiebreakers

===== 2018 FIFA World Cup fixtures and results =====
Win Draw Loss

17 June 2018 2018 FIFA World Cup – Group F	Germany	0–1	Mexico	Moscow, Russia
17:00 (18:00 UTC+3)		Report	Lozano 35'	Stadium: Luzhniki Stadium; Attendance: 78,011; Referee: (Iran) Alireza Faghani

23 June 2018 2018 FIFA World Cup – Group F	Germany	2–1	Sweden	Sochi, Russia
20:00 (21:00 UTC+3)	Reus 48'; Kroos 90+5'	Report	Toivonen 32'	Stadium: Fisht Olympic Stadium; Attendance: 44,287; Referee: (Poland) Szymon Marciniak

27 June 2018 2018 FIFA World Cup – Group F	South Korea	2–0	Germany	Kazan, Russia
16:00 (17:00 UTC+3)	Kim Young-gwon 90+3'; Son Heung-min 90+6'	Report		Stadium: Kazan Arena; Attendance: 41,835; Referee: (United States) Mark Geiger

==== Friendly matches ====
Win Draw Loss

10 November 2017 Friendly	England	0–0	Germany	London, England
21:00 (20:00 UTC±0)		Report (DFB)		Stadium: Wembley Stadium; Attendance: 81,382; Referee: (Poland) Paweł Raczkowski

14 November 2017 Friendly	Germany	2–2	France	Cologne, Germany
20:45 (20:45 UTC+1)	Werner 56'; Stindl 90+3'	Report (DFB)	Lacazette 34', 71'	Stadium: RheinEnergieStadion; Attendance: 36,948; Referee: (Turkey) Cüneyt Çakır

23 March 2018 Friendly	Germany	1–1	Spain	Düsseldorf, Germany
20:45 (20:45 UTC+1)	Müller 35'	Report (DFB)	Rodrigo 6'	Stadium: ESPRIT arena Attendance: 50,653; Referee: (Scotland) William Collum

27 March 2018 Friendly	Germany	0–1	Brazil	Berlin, Germany
20:45 (20:45 UTC+2)		Report (DFB)	Gabriel Jesus 37'	Stadium: Olympiastadion; Attendance: 72,717; Referee: (Sweden) Jonas Eriksson

2 June 2018 Friendly	Austria	2–1	Germany	Klagenfurt, Austria
19:40 (19:40 UTC+2)	Hinteregger 53'; Schöpf 69'	Report (DFB)	Özil 11'	Stadium: Wörthersee Stadion; Attendance: 29,200; Referee: (Czech Republic) Pavel Královec
Note: The match was originally scheduled for 18:00, but was delayed due to inclement weather.

8 June 2018 Friendly	Germany	2–1	Saudi Arabia	Leverkusen, Germany
19:30 (19:30 UTC+2)	Werner 8'; Hawsawi 43' (o.g.)	Report (DFB)	Al-Jassim 85'	Stadium: BayArena; Attendance: 30,210; Referee: (Slovenia) Slavko Vinčić

=== Germany women's national football team ===
==== 2019 FIFA Women's World Cup qualification ====
Pos	Team	Pld	W	D	L	GF	GA	GD	Pts	Qualification
1	Germany	8	7	0	1	38	3	+35	21	2019 FIFA Women's World Cup
2	Iceland	8	5	2	1	22	6	+16	17	
3	Czech Republic	8	4	2	2	20	8	+12	14	
4	Slovenia	8	2	0	6	9	20	−11	6	
5	Faroe Islands	8	0	0	8	1	53	−52	0	

Source: UEFA
Rules for classification: Qualification tiebreakers

Win Draw Loss

16 September 2017 2019 FIFA World Cup qualification	Germany	6–0	Slovenia	Ingolstadt, Germany
14:00 (14:00 UTC+2)	Huth 15'; Marozsán 18' (pen.); Handrich 35'; Kemme 45+2', 80'; Demann 88'	Report		Stadium: Audi Sportpark; Attendance: 3,112; Referee: (Belarus) Volha Tsiareshka

19 September 2017 2019 FIFA World Cup qualification	Czech Republic	0–1	Germany	Ústí nad Labem, Czech Republic
17:58 (17:58 UTC+2)		Report	Bartoňová 51' (o.g.)	Stadium: Městský stadion Attendance: 1,500; Referee: (Spain) Marta Huerta de Aza

20 October 2017 2019 FIFA World Cup qualification	Germany	2–3	Iceland	Wiesbaden, Germany
16:00 (16:00 UTC+2)	Popp 42'; Schüller 88'	Report	Brynjarsdóttir 15', 58'; Jensen 47'	Stadium: BRITA-Arena; Attendance: 4,292; Referee: (France) Stéphanie Frappart

24 October 2017 2019 FIFA World Cup qualification	Germany	11–0	Faroe Islands	Großaspach, Germany
16:10 (16:10 UTC+2)	Popp 12', 45+1'; Kemme 15', 27'; Peter 30'; Hendrich 33'; Magull 48'; Kayikçi 63', 76', 83', 89'	Report		Stadium: Mechatronik Arena; Attendance: 2,207; Referee: (Portugal) Ana Aguiar

7 April 2018 2019 FIFA World Cup qualification	Germany	4–0	Czech Republic	Halle, Germany
16:15 (16:15 UTC+2)	Schüller 4', 31', 68', 79'	Report		Stadium: Erdgas Sportpark; Attendance: 4,564; Referee: (Ukraine) Kateryna Monzul

10 April 2018 2019 FIFA World Cup qualification	Slovenia	0–4	Germany	Domžale, Slovenia
		Report	Magull 10'; Golob 43' (o.g.); Popp 53'; Dallmann 61'	Stadium: Domžale Sports Park; Attendance: 500; Referee: (England) Sarah Garratt

==== 2018 SheBelieves Cup ====
Pos	Team	Pld	W	D	L	GF	GA	GD	Pts
1st place, gold medalist(s)	United States (H, C)	3	2	1	0	3	1	+2	7
2nd place, silver medalist(s)	England	3	1	1	1	6	4	+2	4
3rd place, bronze medalist(s)	France	3	1	1	1	5	5	0	4
4	Germany	3	0	1	2	2	6	−4	1

Source: USSoccer
Rules for classification: 1) points; 2) goal difference; 3) goals scored; 4) head-to-head points; 5) head-to-head goal difference; 6) head-to-head number of goals scored; 7) FIFA ranking.
(C) Champions; (H) Hosts

Win Draw Loss

1 March 2018 2018 SheBelieves Cup	United States	1–0	Germany	Columbus, Ohio, United States
19:00 EST (UTC−5)	Rapinoe 17'	Report		Stadium: MAPFRE Stadium; Attendance: 14,591; Referee: (Honduras) Melissa Borjas

4 March 2018 2018 SheBelieves Cup	Germany	2–2	England	Harrison, New Jersey, United States
15:00 EST (UTC−5)	Kayikçi 17'; Bright 52' (o.g.)	Report	White 18', 73'	Stadium: Red Bull Arena; Attendance: 7,882; Referee: (United States) Karen Abt

7 March 2018 2018 SheBelieves Cup	France	3–0	Germany	Orlando, Florida, United States
19:00 EST (UTC−5)	Henry 10'; Le Sommer 55'; Gauvin 68'	Report		Stadium: Orlando City Stadium; Attendance: 6,525; Referee: (United States) Christina Unkel

==== Friendly matches ====
Win Draw Loss

24 November 2017 Friendly	Germany	4–0	France	Bielefeld, Germany
17:55 (17:55 UTC+2)	Popp 21', 44'; Huth 39', 53'	Report		Stadium: Schüco Arena; Attendance: 6,505; Referee: (Scotland) Lorraine Watson

10 June 2018 Friendly	Canada	2–3	Germany	Hamilton, Ontario, Canada
21:00 (15:00 UTC−4)	Sinclair 59'; Fleming 69'	Report	Huth 1'; Däbritz 70'; Knaak 84'	Stadium: Tim Hortons Field; Attendance: 22,826; Referee: (China) Qin Lian

== League season ==
=== Men ===
==== Bundesliga ====
===== Bundesliga standings =====
Pos	Team	Pld	W	D	L	GF	GA	GD	Pts	Qualification or relegation
1	Bayern Munich (C)	34	27	3	4	92	28	+64	84	Qualification for the Champions League group stage
2	Schalke 04	34	18	9	7	53	37	+16	63	Qualification for the Champions League group stage
3	1899 Hoffenheim	34	15	10	9	66	48	+18	55	Qualification for the Champions League group stage
4	Borussia Dortmund	34	15	10	9	64	47	+17	55	Qualification for the Champions League group stage
5	Bayer Leverkusen	34	15	10	9	58	44	+14	55	Qualification for the Europa League group stage
6	RB Leipzig	34	15	8	11	57	53	+4	53	Qualification for the Europa League second qualifying round
7	VfB Stuttgart	34	15	6	13	36	36	0	51	
8	Eintracht Frankfurt	34	14	7	13	45	45	0	49	Qualification for the Europa League group stage (Note: Eintracht Frankfurt qualified for the Europa League group stage by winning the 2017–18 DFB-Pokal.)
9	Borussia Mönchengladbach	34	13	8	13	47	52	−5	47	
10	Hertha BSC	34	10	13	11	43	46	−3	43	
11	Werder Bremen	34	10	12	12	37	40	−3	42	
12	FC Augsburg	34	10	11	13	43	46	−3	41	
13	Hannover 96	34	10	9	15	44	54	−10	39	
14	Mainz 05	34	9	9	16	38	52	−14	36	
15	SC Freiburg	34	8	12	14	32	56	−24	36	
16	VfL Wolfsburg (O)	34	6	15	13	36	48	−12	33	Qualification for the relegation play-offs
17	Hamburger SV (R)	34	8	7	19	29	53	−24	31	Relegation to 2. Bundesliga
18	1. FC Köln (R)	34	5	7	22	35	70	−35	22	Relegation to 2. Bundesliga

Source: DFB
Rules for classification: 1) Points; 2) Goal difference; 3) Goals scored; 4) Head-to-head results; 5) Head-to-head away goals scored; 6) Away goals scored; 7) Play-off.
(C) Champions; (O) Play-off winners; (R) Relegated

==== 2. Bundesliga ====
===== 2. Bundesliga standings =====
Pos	Team	Pld	W	D	L	GF	GA	GD	Pts	Promotion, qualification or relegation
1	Fortuna Düsseldorf (C, P)	34	19	6	9	57	44	+13	63	Promotion to Bundesliga
2	1. FC Nürnberg (P)	34	17	9	8	61	39	+22	60	Promotion to Bundesliga
3	Holstein Kiel	34	14	14	6	71	44	+27	56	Qualification for promotion play-offs
4	Arminia Bielefeld	34	12	12	10	51	47	+4	48	
5	Jahn Regensburg	34	14	6	14	53	53	0	48	
6	VfL Bochum	34	13	9	12	37	40	−3	48	
7	MSV Duisburg	34	13	9	12	52	56	−4	48	
8	Union Berlin	34	12	11	11	54	46	+8	47	
9	FC Ingolstadt	34	12	9	13	47	45	+2	45	
10	Darmstadt 98	34	10	13	11	47	45	+2	43	
11	SV Sandhausen	34	11	10	13	35	33	+2	43	
12	FC St. Pauli	34	11	10	13	35	48	−13	43	
13	1. FC Heidenheim	34	11	9	14	50	56	−6	42	
14	Dynamo Dresden	34	11	8	15	42	52	−10	41	
15	Greuther Fürth	34	10	10	14	37	48	−11	40	
16	Erzgebirge Aue (O)	34	10	10	14	35	49	−14	40	Qualification for relegation play-offs
17	Eintracht Braunschweig (R)	34	8	15	11	37	43	−6	39	Relegation to 3. Liga
18	1. FC Kaiserslautern (R)	34	9	8	17	42	55	−13	35	Relegation to 3. Liga

Source: DFB
Rules for classification: 1) Points; 2) Goal difference; 3) Goals scored
(C) Champions; (O) Play-off winners; (P) Promoted; (R) Relegated

==== 3. Liga ====
===== 3. Liga standings =====
Pos	Team	Pld	W	D	L	GF	GA	GD	Pts	Promotion, qualification or relegation
1	1. FC Magdeburg (C, P)	38	27	4	7	70	32	+38	85	Promotion to 2. Bundesliga and qualification for DFB-Pokal
2	SC Paderborn (P)	38	25	8	5	90	33	+57	83	Promotion to 2. Bundesliga and qualification for DFB-Pokal
3	Karlsruher SC	38	19	12	7	49	29	+20	69	Qualification for promotion play-offs and DFB-Pokal
4	Wehen Wiesbaden	38	21	5	12	76	39	+37	68	Qualification for DFB-Pokal
5	Würzburger Kickers	38	17	10	11	53	46	+7	61	
6	Hansa Rostock	38	16	12	10	48	34	+14	60	
7	SV Meppen	38	15	13	10	50	47	+3	58	
8	Fortuna Köln	38	15	9	14	53	48	+5	54	
9	SpVgg Unterhaching	38	16	6	16	54	55	−1	54	
10	Preußen Münster	38	14	10	14	50	49	+1	52	
11	Carl Zeiss Jena	38	14	10	14	49	59	−10	52	
12	VfR Aalen	38	13	11	14	48	57	−9	50	
13	Hallescher FC	38	13	10	15	52	54	−2	49	
14	Sonnenhof Großaspach	38	12	11	15	55	60	−5	47	
15	FSV Zwickau	38	10	11	17	38	55	−17	41	
16	Sportfreunde Lotte	38	11	7	20	43	60	−17	40	
17	VfL Osnabrück	38	8	13	17	47	67	−20	37	
18	Werder Bremen II (Note: Reserve teams are ineligible for promotion or DFB-Pokal qualification.) (R)	38	6	13	19	39	62	−23	31	Relegation to Regionalliga
19	Chemnitzer FC (Note: On 23 April 2018, Chemnitzer FC was deducted nine points after filing for insolvency, where Chemnitz did not appeal against.) (R)	38	8	7	23	48	74	−26	22	Relegation to Regionalliga
20	Rot-Weiß Erfurt (Note: On 13 February 2018, Rot-Weiß Erfurt was deducted one point, which Erfurt appealed. It was denied on 23 February 2018 and confirmed on 13 March 2018. Another nine points were deducted, on 29 March 2018, after Erfurt filed for insolvency. It was made official on 6 April 2018 after Erfurt did not appeal against it.) (R)	38	5	8	25	26	78	−52	13	Relegation to Regionalliga

Source: DFB
Rules for classification: 1) Points; 2) Goal difference; 3) Goals scored
(C) Champions; (P) Promoted; (R) Relegated

==== DFB-Pokal ====
===== Final =====
19 May 2018
20:00 CEST

Bayern Munich	1–3	Eintracht Frankfurt
Lewandowski 53'	Report	Rebić 11', 82'; Gaćinović 90+6'

Olympiastadion, Berlin
Attendance: 74,322
Referee: Felix Zwayer (Berlin)

==== DFL-Supercup ====
===== 2017 DFL-Supercup =====
5 August 2017
20:30 CEST

Borussia Dortmund	2–2	Bayern Munich
Pulisic 12'; Aubameyang 71'	Report	Lewandowski 18'; Bürki 88' (o.g.)
Penalties
Dembélé (penalty scored); Philipp (penalty scored); Aubameyang (penalty scored); Rode (penalty missed); Castro (penalty scored); Bartra (penalty missed)	4–5	(penalty scored) Lewandowski; (penalty scored) Ribéry; (penalty missed) Kimmich; (penalty scored) Rudy; (penalty scored) Vidal; (penalty scored) Süle

Signal Iduna Park, Dortmund
Attendance: 81,360
Referee: Felix Zwayer (Berlin)

=== Women ===
==== Frauen-Bundesliga ====
Pos	Team	Pld	W	D	L	GF	GA	GD	Pts	Qualification or relegation
1	VfL Wolfsburg (C)	22	18	2	2	56	8	+48	56	Qualification for Champions League
2	Bayern Munich	22	17	2	3	62	15	+47	53	Qualification for Champions League
3	SC Freiburg	22	15	3	4	50	15	+35	48	
4	Turbine Potsdam	22	13	6	3	50	21	+29	45	
5	SGS Essen	22	12	3	7	43	30	+13	39	
6	1. FFC Frankfurt	22	10	1	11	29	25	+4	31	
7	SC Sand	22	9	3	10	32	34	−2	30	
8	1899 Hoffenheim	22	8	1	13	22	32	−10	25	
9	MSV Duisburg	22	6	0	16	16	33	−17	18	
10	Werder Bremen	22	3	5	14	26	59	−33	14	
11	1. FC Köln (R)	22	3	2	17	8	78	−70	11	Relegation to 2. Bundesliga
12	USV Jena (R)	22	2	4	16	12	56	−44	10	Relegation to 2. Bundesliga

Source: Kicker
Rules for classification: 1) Points; 2) Goal difference; 3) Goals scored
(C) Champions; (R) Relegated

==== 2. Frauen-Bundesliga ====
===== Nord =====
Pos	Team	Pld	W	D	L	GF	GA	GD	Pts	Promotion, qualification or relegation
1	Borussia Mönchengladbach (C, P)	22	15	4	3	75	25	+50	49	Promotion to 2018–19 Bundesliga
2	VfL Wolfsburg II (Note: Reserve teams cannot compete in the Frauen-Bundesliga and therefore are ineligible for promotion.)	22	14	4	4	65	14	+51	46	
3	SV Meppen	22	14	4	4	71	32	+39	46	
4	Turbine Potsdam II	22	14	0	8	70	39	+31	42	
5	BV Cloppenburg	22	12	4	6	53	29	+24	40	
6	FSV Gütersloh	22	11	3	8	64	45	+19	36	
7	USV Jena II (R)	22	11	3	8	40	35	+5	36	Qualification for the relegation play-offs
8	Arminia Bielefeld (R)	22	11	2	9	46	30	+16	35	Relegation to 2018–19 Regionalliga
9	SV Henstedt-Ulzburg (R)	22	5	1	16	36	90	−54	16	Relegation to 2018–19 Regionalliga
10	Jahn Delmenhorst (R)	22	4	2	16	25	81	−56	14	Relegation to 2018–19 Regionalliga
11	Blau-Weiß Hohen Neuendorf (R)	22	2	4	16	18	76	−58	10	Relegation to 2018–19 Regionalliga
12	Herforder SV (R)	22	2	3	17	27	94	−67	9	Relegation to 2018–19 Regionalliga

Source: DFB
Rules for classification: 1) Points; 2) Goal difference; 3) Goals scored
(C) Champions; (P) Promoted; (R) Relegated

===== Süd =====
Pos	Team	Pld	W	D	L	GF	GA	GD	Pts	Promotion, qualification or relegation
1	1899 Hoffenheim II (Note: Reserve teams cannot compete in the Frauen-Bundesliga and therefore are ineligible for promotion.) (C)	22	18	2	2	61	17	+44	56	
2	Bayern Munich II	22	17	3	2	59	19	+40	54	
3	Bayer Leverkusen (P)	22	13	2	7	47	37	+10	41	Promotion to 2018–19 Bundesliga
4	1. FC Saarbrücken	22	10	6	6	48	36	+12	36	
5	1. FFC Frankfurt II	22	10	3	9	38	27	+11	33	
6	Hessen Wetzlar	22	10	1	11	33	34	−1	31	
7	VfL Sindelfingen (R)	22	6	9	7	26	31	−5	27	Qualification for the relegation play-offs
8	Schott Mainz (R)	22	7	5	10	31	49	−18	26	Relegation to 2018–19 Regionalliga
9	SC Freiburg II (R)	22	5	7	10	28	31	−3	22	Relegation to 2018–19 Regionalliga
10	1. FFC Niederkirchen (R)	22	4	4	14	18	54	−36	16	Relegation to 2018–19 Regionalliga
11	SG Andernach (R)	22	4	2	16	29	52	−23	14	Relegation to 2018–19 Regionalliga
12	1. FC Köln II (R)	22	2	8	12	23	54	−31	14	Relegation to 2018–19 Regionalliga

Source: DFB
Rules for classification: 1) Points; 2) Goal difference; 3) Goals scored
(C) Champions; (P) Promoted; (R) Relegated

== German clubs in Europe ==
=== UEFA Champions League ===
==== Play-off round ====
Team 1	Agg.	Team 2	1st leg	2nd leg
1899 Hoffenheim (Germany)	3–6	(England) Liverpool	1–2	2–4

==== Group stage ====
===== Group B =====
Pos	Team	Pld	W	D	L	GF	GA	GD	Pts	Qualification	PAR	BAY	CEL	AND
1	(France) Paris Saint-Germain	6	5	0	1	25	4	+21	15 (Note: Head-to-head results: Paris Saint-Germain 3–0 Bayern Munich, Bayern Munich 3–1 Paris Saint-Germain.)	Advance to knockout phase	—	3–0	7–1	5–0
2	(Germany) Bayern Munich	6	5	0	1	13	6	+7	15	Advance to knockout phase	3–1	—	3–0	3–0
3	(Scotland) Celtic	6	1	0	5	5	18	−13	3 (Note: Head-to-head results: Anderlecht 0–3 Celtic, Celtic 0–1 Anderlecht.)	Transfer to Europa League	0–5	1–2	—	0–1
4	(Belgium) Anderlecht	6	1	0	5	2	17	−15	3		0–4	1–2	0–3	—

Source: UEFA

===== Group G =====
Pos	Team	Pld	W	D	L	GF	GA	GD	Pts	Qualification	BES	POR	RBL	MON
1	(Turkey) Beşiktaş	6	4	2	0	11	5	+6	14	Advance to knockout phase	—	1–1	2–0	1–1
2	(Portugal) Porto	6	3	1	2	15	10	+5	10	Advance to knockout phase	1–3	—	3–1	5–2
3	(Germany) RB Leipzig	6	2	1	3	10	11	−1	7	Transfer to Europa League	1–2	3–2	—	1–1
4	(France) Monaco	6	0	2	4	6	16	−10	2		1–2	0–3	1–4	—

Source: UEFA

===== Group H =====
Pos	Team	Pld	W	D	L	GF	GA	GD	Pts	Qualification	TOT	RMA	DOR	APO
1	(England) Tottenham Hotspur	6	5	1	0	15	4	+11	16	Advance to knockout phase	—	3–1	3–1	3–0
2	(Spain) Real Madrid	6	4	1	1	17	7	+10	13	Advance to knockout phase	1–1	—	3–2	3–0
3	(Germany) Borussia Dortmund	6	0	2	4	7	13	−6	2 (Note: Head-to-head results: APOEL 1–1 Borussia Dortmund, Borussia Dortmund 1–1 APOEL (tied on head-to-head results, ranked on total goal difference).)	Transfer to Europa League	1–2	1–3	—	1–1
4	(Cyprus) APOEL	6	0	2	4	2	17	−15	2		0–3	0–6	1–1	—

Source: UEFA

==== Knockout phase ====
===== Round of 16 =====
Team 1	Agg.	Team 2	1st leg	2nd leg
Bayern Munich (Germany)	8–1	(Turkey) Beşiktaş	5–0	3–1

===== Quarter-finals =====
Team 1	Agg.	Team 2	1st leg	2nd leg
Sevilla (Spain)	1–2	(Germany) Bayern Munich	1–2	0–0

===== Semi-finals =====
Team 1	Agg.	Team 2	1st leg	2nd leg
Bayern Munich (Germany)	3–4	(Spain) Real Madrid	1–2	2–2

=== UEFA Europa League ===
==== Third qualifying round ====
Team 1	Agg.	Team 2	1st leg	2nd leg
SC Freiburg (Germany)	1–2	(Slovenia) Domžale	1–0	0–2

==== Group stage ====
===== Group C =====
Pos	Team	Pld	W	D	L	GF	GA	GD	Pts	Qualification	BRA	LUD	IBS	HOF
1	(Portugal) Braga	6	3	1	2	9	8	+1	10	Advance to knockout phase	—	0–2	2–1	3–1
2	(Bulgaria) Ludogorets Razgrad	6	2	3	1	7	5	+2	9	Advance to knockout phase	1–1	—	1–2	2–1
3	(Turkey) İstanbul Başakşehir	6	2	2	2	7	8	−1	8		2–1	0–0	—	1–1
4	(Germany) TSG Hoffenheim	6	1	2	3	8	10	−2	5		1–2	1–1	3–1	—

Source: UEFA

===== Group H =====
Pos	Team	Pld	W	D	L	GF	GA	GD	Pts	Qualification	ARS	ZVE	KLN	BATE
1	(England) Arsenal	6	4	1	1	14	4	+10	13	Advance to knockout phase	—	0–0	3–1	6–0
2	(Serbia) Red Star Belgrade	6	2	3	1	3	2	+1	9	Advance to knockout phase	0–1	—	1–0	1–1
3	(Germany) 1. FC Köln	6	2	0	4	7	8	−1	6		1–0	0–1	—	5–2
4	(Belarus) BATE Borisov	6	1	2	3	6	16	−10	5		2–4	0–0	1–0	—

Source: UEFA

===== Group J =====
Pos	Team	Pld	W	D	L	GF	GA	GD	Pts	Qualification	ATH	OST	ZOR	HRT
1	(Spain) Athletic Bilbao	6	3	2	1	8	5	+3	11 (Note: Head-to-head results: Östersund 2–2 Athletic Bilbao, Athletic Bilbao 1–0 Östersund.)	Advance to knockout phase	—	1–0	0–1	3–2
2	(Sweden) Östersunds FK	6	3	2	1	8	4	+4	11	Advance to knockout phase	2–2	—	2–0	1–0
3	(Ukraine) Zorya Luhansk	6	2	0	4	3	9	−6	6		0–2	0–2	—	2–1
4	(Germany) Hertha BSC	6	1	2	3	6	7	−1	5		0–0	1–1	2–0	—

Source: UEFA

==== Knockout phase ====
===== Round of 32 =====
Team 1	Agg.	Team 2	1st leg	2nd leg
Borussia Dortmund (Germany)	4–3	(Italy) Atalanta	3–2	1–1
Napoli (Italy)	3–3 (a)	(Germany) RB Leipzig	1–3	2–0

===== Round of 16 =====
Team 1	Agg.	Team 2	1st leg	2nd leg
RB Leipzig (Germany)	3–2	(Russia) Zenit Saint Petersburg	2–1	1–1
Borussia Dortmund (Germany)	1–2	(Austria) Red Bull Salzburg	1–2	0–0

===== Quarter-finals =====
Team 1	Agg.	Team 2	1st leg	2nd leg
RB Leipzig (Germany)	3–5	(France) Marseille	1–0	2–5

=== UEFA Women's Champions League ===
==== Knockout phase ====
===== Round of 32 =====
Team 1	Agg.	Team 2	1st leg	2nd leg
Atlético Madrid (Spain)	2–15	(Germany) VfL Wolfsburg	0–3	2–12
Chelsea (England)	2–2 (a)	(Germany) Bayern Munich	1–0	1–2

===== Round of 16 =====
Team 1	Agg.	Team 2	1st leg	2nd leg
Fiorentina (Italy)	3–7	(Germany) VfL Wolfsburg	0–4	3–3

===== Quarter-finals =====
Team 1	Agg.	Team 2	1st leg	2nd leg
VfL Wolfsburg (Germany)	6–1	(Czech Republic) Slavia Praha	5–0	1–1

===== Semi-finals =====
Team 1	Agg.	Team 2	1st leg	2nd leg
Chelsea (England)	1–5	(Germany) VfL Wolfsburg	1–3	0–2

===== Final =====
24 May 2018
19:00 UTC+3

Wolfsburg (Germany)	1–4 (a.e.t.)	(France) Lyon
Harder 93'	Report	Henry 98'; Le Sommer 99'; Hegerberg 103'; Abily 116'

Valeriy Lobanovskyi Dynamo Stadium, Kyiv
Attendance: 14,237
Referee: Jana Adámková (Czech Republic)
