= UEFA Women's Euro 2022 qualifying Group A =

Football tournament qualification stage

Group A of the UEFA Women's Euro 2022 qualifying competition consists of six teams: Netherlands, Russia, Slovenia, Turkey, Kosovo, and Estonia. The composition of the nine groups in the qualifying group stage was decided by the draw held on 21 February 2019, 13:30 CET (UTC+1), at the UEFA headquarters in Nyon, Switzerland. with the teams seeded according to their coefficient ranking.

The group is played in home-and-away round-robin format between August 2019 and December 2020. The group winners and the three best runners-up among all nine groups (not counting results against the sixth-placed team) qualify directly for the final tournament, while the remaining six runners-up advance to the play-offs.

On 17 March 2020, all matches were put on hold due to the COVID-19 pandemic.

== Standings ==
Pos	Team	Pld	W	D	L	GF	GA	GD	Pts	Qualification	Netherlands	Russia	Slovenia	Kosovo	Turkey	Estonia
1	Netherlands	10	10	0	0	48	3	+45	30	Final tournament	—	2–0	4–1	6–0	3–0	7–0
2	Russia	10	8	0	2	23	6	+17	24	Play-offs	0–1	—	1–0	3–0	4–2	4–0
3	Slovenia	10	6	0	4	31	12	+19	18		2–4	0–1	—	5–0	3–1	2–0
4	Kosovo	10	3	1	6	6	29	−23	10		0–6	0–5	0–3	—	2–0	2–0
5	Turkey	10	1	2	7	9	28	−19	5		0–8	1–2	1–6	0–0	—	0–0
6	Estonia	10	0	1	9	1	40	−39	1		0–7	0–3	0–9	1–2	0–4	—

Source: UEFA
Rules for classification: Tiebreakers

== Matches ==
Times are CET/CEST, (Note: CEST (UTC+2) for dates between 31 March and 26 October 2019 and between 29 March and 24 October 2020, and CET (UTC+1) for all other dates.) as listed by UEFA (local times, if different, are in parentheses).

30 August 2019
18:00 (19:00 EEST)

Estonia	0–7	Netherlands
	Report	Miedema 27', 69'; Roord 31'; Spitse 40', 51'; Bloodworth 81'; E. Jansen 85'

A. Le Coq Arena, Tallinn
Attendance: 1,881
Referee: Olga Zadinová (Czech Republic)
30 August 2019
20:00

Slovenia	0–1	Russia
	Report	Chernomyrdina 25'

Ob Jezeru City Stadium, Velenje
Attendance: 250
Referee: Dimitrina Milkova (Bulgaria)
30 August 2019
20:00

Kosovo	2–0	Turkey
Uka 33'; L. Syla 39'	Report

Fadil Vokrri Stadium, Pristina
Attendance: 3,200
Referee: Emilie Dokset (Norway)

3 September 2019
17:00

Slovenia	5–0	Kosovo
Prašnikar 14', 62'; Zver 41', 56'; Kolbl 48'	Report

Dravograd Sports Centre, Dravograd
Attendance: 450
Referee: Rasa Imanalijeva (Lithuania)
3 September 2019
18:00 (19:00 MSK)

Russia	4–0	Estonia
Korovkina 10', 57'; Fedorova 29'; Myagkova 82'	Report

Sapsan Arena, Moscow
Attendance: 667
Referee: Katalin Sipos (Hungary)
3 September 2019
20:00

Netherlands	3–0	Turkey
Van der Gragt 13'; Van de Donk 55'; Spitse 84' (pen.)	Report

Abe Lenstra Stadion, Heerenveen
Attendance: 21,500
Referee: Iuliana Demetrescu (Romania)

4 October 2019
15:00 (16:00 TRT)

Turkey	0–0	Estonia
	Report

Sancaktepe Stadium, Istanbul
Attendance: 220
Referee: Marta Frias Acedo (Spain)
4 October 2019
19:00

Slovenia	2–4	Netherlands
Zver 11'; Korošec 68'	Report	Miedema 28'; Beerensteyn 47'; Spitse 78', 83'

Fazanerija City Stadium, Murska Sobota
Attendance: 1,050
Referee: Petra Pavlikova (Slovakia)

8 October 2019
15:00 (16:00 TRT)

Turkey	1–6	Slovenia
Kara 90+1'	Report	Prašnikar 12', 38', 41'; Rozmarič 25'; Zver 28' (pen.); Kolbl 51'

Kocaeli Stadium, İzmit
Attendance: 256
Referee: Silvia Domingos (Portugal)
8 October 2019
18:15 (19:15 EEST)

Estonia	1–2	Kosovo
Loo 22' (pen.)	Report	Uka 41', 56'

Tamme Stadium, Tartu
Attendance: 377
Referee: Iuliana Demetrescu (Romania)
8 October 2019
20:00

Netherlands	2–0	Russia
Van de Donk 12'; Miedema 60'	Report

Philips Stadion, Eindhoven
Attendance: 23,887
Referee: Ivana Martinčić (Croatia)

8 November 2019
17:00 (19:00 TRT)

Turkey	0–8	Netherlands
	Report	Van de Sanden 26'; Spitse 31' (pen.), 90+1'; Miedema 45+1', 62'; Van de Donk 56', 68', 73'

Bornova Stadium, İzmir
Attendance: 2,354
Referee: Jelena Cvetković (Serbia)

12 November 2019
20:00

Netherlands	4–1	Slovenia
Spitse 34' (pen.), 53' (pen.); Miedema 58', 71'	Report	Eržen 30'

GelreDome, Arnhem
Attendance: 23,120
Referee: Rebecca Welch (England)

6 March 2020 (Note: The Kosovo v Russia match, originally scheduled for 4 October 2019, 18:00 CEST, at the Fadil Vokrri Stadium, Pristina, was postponed on 28 September 2019 due to security issues. The match was later rescheduled to 6 March 2020. On 18 October 2019, UEFA announced that both matches between Kosovo and Russia will be played on neutral venues.)
18:00

Kosovo	0–5	Russia
	Report	F. Shala 1' (o.g.); Korovkina 33'; Smirnova 47', 53'; Fedorova 50'

Brita-Arena, Wiesbaden (Germany)
Attendance: 450
Referee: Henrikke Nervik (Norway)

10 March 2020
18:00

Kosovo	0–3	Slovenia
	Report	Begič 14'; Predanič 37'; Milović 90+3'

Fadil Vokrri Stadium, Pristina
Attendance: 1500
Referee: Lois Otte (Belgium)

18 September 2020
16:00 (17:00 MSK)

Russia	0–1	Netherlands
	Report	Roord 15'

Sapsan Arena, Moscow
Attendance: 0
Referee: Pernilla Larsson (Sweden)
18 September 2020
19:00

Kosovo	2–0	Estonia
Biqkaj 7', 27'	Report

Fadil Vokrri Stadium, Pristina
Attendance: 0
Referee: Olivia Tschon (Austria)
18 September 2020
20:00

Slovenia	3–1	Turkey
Zver 28' (pen.); Prašnikar 41'; Kolbl 78'	Report	Hız 18'

Stanko Mlakar Stadium, Kranj
Attendance: 0
Referee: Viki De Cremer (Belgium)

22 September 2020 (Note: All matches originally scheduled to be played in April and June 2020 were postponed due to the COVID-19 pandemic in Europe. These matches were subsequently rescheduled to be played between September and December 2020.)
15:00 (16:00 EEST)

Estonia	0–3	Russia
	Report	Yakovleva 23'; Mashina 76'; Korovkina 90+4'

Slokas Stadium, Jūrmala (Latvia) (Note: The match between Estonia and Russia was played in Latvia due to travel restrictions related to the COVID-19 pandemic between Estonia and Russia.)
Attendance: 0
Referee: Simona Ghisletta (Switzerland)

23 October 2020
16:30 (17:30 MSK)

Russia	1–0	Slovenia
Korovkina 74'	Report

Sapsan Arena, Moscow
Attendance: 234
Referee: Jana Adámková (Czech Republic)
23 October 2020
18:00 (19:00 TRT)

Turkey	0–0	Kosovo
	Report

Arslan Zeki Demirci Sports Complex, Manavgat
Attendance: 0
Referee: Stacey Pearson (England)
23 October 2020
19:30

Netherlands	7–0	Estonia
Van de Donk 7', 16'; Groenen 26', 65'; Spitse 38' (pen.); Nouwen 76'; Snoeijs 83'	Report

Euroborg, Groningen
Attendance: 0
Referee: Tess Olofsson (Sweden)

27 October 2020
15:00 (17:00 MSK)

Russia	4–2	Turkey
Korovkina 13'; Chernomyrdina 22', 46'; N. Mashina 49'	Report	Arhan 77'; Karagenç 86'

Sapsan Arena, Moscow
Attendance: 250
Referee: Elvira Nurmustafina (Kazakhstan)
27 October 2020
19:00

Kosovo	0–6	Netherlands
	Report	Van de Donk 11'; Snoeijs 31', 44', 90+5'; Martens 34'; Miedema 90+4'

Fadil Vokrri Stadium, Pristina
Attendance: 50
Referee: Sandra Braz Bastos (Portugal)

27 November 2020
17:00 (18:00 EET)

Estonia	0–4	Turkey
	Report	Türkoğlu 29'; Civelek 55'; Hız 76'; Uraz 81'

Sportsland, Tallinn
Attendance: 127
Referee: Volha Tsiareshka (Belarus)
27 November 2020
17:00 (19:00 TRT)

Russia	3–0	Kosovo
Fedorova 6', 12'; Abdullina 9'	Report

Arslan Zeki Demirci Sports Complex, Manavgat (Turkey)
Attendance: 0
Referee: Ewa Augustyn (Poland)

1 December 2020 (Note: Matches originally scheduled to be played on 22 September 2020 were rearranged following postponements to other matches due to the COVID-19 pandemic in Europe.)
15:00 (17:00 TRT)

Turkey	1–2	Russia
Arhan 56'	Report	Belomyttseva 29'; Fedorova 45+1'

Arslan Zeki Demirci Sports Complex, Manavgat
Attendance: 0
Referee: Sandra Braz Bastos (Portugal)
1 December 2020
18:00

Slovenia	2–0	Estonia
Kralj 27'; Kork 59' (o.g.)	Report

Bonifika Stadium, Koper
Attendance: 0
Referee: Maria Marotta (Italy)
1 December 2020
18:30

Netherlands	6–0	Kosovo
Snoeijs 49', 75', 84'; Roord 51', 83'; Martens 58'	Report

Rat Verlegh Stadion, Breda
Attendance: 0
Referee: Barbara Poxhofer (Austria)

23 February 2021
17:00 (18:00 EET)

Estonia	0–9	Slovenia
	Report	Čonč 31'; Zver 44', 54'; Milovič 60'; Prašnikar 68' (pen.), 81'; Klopčič 70'; Vindišar 74', 77'

Sportland Arena, Tallinn
Attendance: 0
Referee: Eszter Urbán (Hungary)

== Goalscorers ==
There were 118 goals scored in 30 matches, for an average of 3.93 goals per match.

10 goals

- (Netherlands) Sherida Spitse

9 goals

- (Netherlands) Vivianne Miedema

8 goals

- (Netherlands) Daniëlle van de Donk
- (Slovenia) Lara Prašnikar

7 goals

- (Netherlands) Katja Snoeijs
- (Slovenia) Mateja Zver

6 goals

- (Russia) Nelli Korovkina

5 goals

- (Russia) Marina Fedorova

4 goals

- (Netherlands) Jill Roord

3 goals

- (Kosovo) Modesta Uka
- (Russia) Margarita Chernomyrdina
- (Slovenia) Špela Kolbl

2 goals

- (Kosovo) Kaltrina Biqkaj
- (Netherlands) Jackie Groenen
- (Netherlands) Lieke Martens
- (Russia) Natalya Mashina
- (Russia) Nadezhda Smirnova
- (Slovenia) Ana Milović
- (Slovenia) Zala Vindišar
- (Turkey) Derya Arhan
- (Turkey) Gülbin Hız

1 goal

- (Estonia) Katrin Loo
- (Kosovo) Liridona Syla
- (Netherlands) Lineth Beerensteyn
- (Netherlands) Dominique Bloodworth
- (Netherlands) Stefanie van der Gragt
- (Netherlands) Ellen Jansen
- (Netherlands) Aniek Nouwen
- (Netherlands) Shanice van de Sanden
- (Russia) Alsu Abdullina
- (Russia) Anna Belomyttseva
- (Russia) Alina Myagkova
- (Russia) Darya Yakovleva
- (Slovenia) Pamela Begič
- (Slovenia) Dominika Čonč
- (Slovenia) Kaja Eržen
- (Slovenia) Kaja Korošec
- (Slovenia) Lara Klopčič
- (Slovenia) Barbara Kralj
- (Slovenia) Nina Predanič
- (Slovenia) Špela Rozmarič
- (Turkey) İlayda Civelek
- (Turkey) Fatma Kara
- (Turkey) Didem Karagenç
- (Turkey) Ece Türkoğlu
- (Turkey) Yağmur Uraz

1 own goal

- (Estonia) Karina Kork (against Slovenia)
- (Kosovo) Fjolla Shala (against Russia)
