= 2018–19 in German football =

Football in Germany
- Season: 2018–19

Men's football
- Bundesliga: Bayern Munich
- 2. Bundesliga: 1. FC Köln
- 3. Liga: VfL Osnabrück
- DFB-Pokal: Bayern Munich
- DFL-Supercup: Bayern Munich

Women's football
- Frauen-Bundesliga: VfL Wolfsburg
- 2. Frauen-Bundesliga: Bayern Munich II
- DFB-Pokal: VfL Wolfsburg

The 2018–19 season was the 109th season of competitive football in Germany.

== Promotion and relegation ==
=== Pre-season ===
League	Promoted to League	Relegated from League
Bundesliga	Fortuna Düsseldorf; 1. FC Nürnberg	Hamburger SV; 1. FC Köln
2. Bundesliga	1. FC Magdeburg; SC Paderborn	Eintracht Braunschweig; 1. FC Kaiserslautern
3. Liga	Energie Cottbus; 1860 Munich; KFC Uerdingen	Werder Bremen II; Chemnitzer FC; Rot-Weiß Erfurt
Frauen-Bundesliga	Borussia Mönchengladbach; Bayer Leverkusen	USV Jena; 1. FC Köln
2. Frauen-Bundesliga^{1}	SGS Essen II; SV Weinberg	USV Jena II; Arminia Bielefeld; SV Henstedt-Ulzburg; Jahn Delmenhorst; Blau-Weiß Hohen Neuendorf; Herforder SV; VfL Sindelfingen; Schott Mainz; SC Freiburg II; 1. FFC Niederkirchen; SG Andernach; 1. FC Köln II

The women's 2. Bundesliga was restructured for this season, changing from two divisions to one.

=== Post-season ===
League	Promoted to League	Relegated from League
Bundesliga	1. FC Köln; SC Paderborn; Union Berlin	VfB Stuttgart; Hannover 96; 1. FC Nürnberg
2. Bundesliga	VfL Osnabrück; Karlsruher SC; Wehen Wiesbaden	FC Ingolstadt; 1. FC Magdeburg; MSV Duisburg
3. Liga	Chemnitzer FC; Viktoria Köln; Waldhof Mannheim; Bayern Munich II	Energie Cottbus; Sportfreunde Lotte; Fortuna Köln; VfR Aalen
Frauen-Bundesliga	1. FC Köln; USV Jena	Werder Bremen; Borussia Mönchengladbach
2. Frauen-Bundesliga	SG Andernach; Arminia Bielefeld; FC Ingolstadt	Hessen Wetzlar; SV Weinberg; SGS Essen II

== National teams ==
=== Germany national football team ===
==== Kits ====
Home	Away	Home alt.	Away alt.

==== 2018–19 UEFA Nations League ====
===== 2018–19 UEFA Nations League A Group 1 =====
Pos	Team	Pld	W	D	L	GF	GA	GD	Pts	Qualification (Note: Due to revamp of the format for the 2020–21 UEFA Nations League, no teams were eventually relegated.)	(Netherlands)	(France)	(Germany)
1	Netherlands	4	2	1	1	8	4	+4	7 (Note: Head-to-head goal difference: Netherlands +1, France −1.)	Qualification for Nations League Finals	—	2–0	3–0
2	France	4	2	1	1	4	4	0	7		2–1	—	2–1
3	Germany	4	0	2	2	3	7	−4	2		2–2	0–0	—

Source: UEFA
Rules for classification: Tiebreakers

===== 2018–19 UEFA Nations League fixtures and results =====
Win Draw Loss

6 September 2018 2018–19 UEFA Nations League A	Germany	0–0	France	Munich, Germany
20:45 (20:45 UTC+2)		Report		Stadium: Allianz Arena; Attendance: 67,485; Referee: Daniele Orsato (Italy)

13 October 2018 2018–19 UEFA Nations League A	Netherlands	3–0	Germany	Amsterdam, Netherlands
20:45 (20:45 UTC+2)	van Dijk 30'; Depay 87'; Wijnaldum 90+3'	Report		Stadium: Johan Cruyff Arena; Attendance: 52,536; Referee: Cüneyt Çakır (Turkey)

16 October 2018 2018–19 UEFA Nations League A	France	2–1	Germany	Saint-Denis, France
20:45 (20:45 UTC+2)	Griezmann 62', 80' (pen.)	Report	Kroos 14' (pen.)	Stadium: Stade de France; Attendance: 75,000; Referee: Milorad Mažić (Serbia)

19 November 2018 2018–19 UEFA Nations League A	Germany	2–2	Netherlands	Gelsenkirchen, Germany
20:45 (20:45 UTC+1)	Werner 9'; Sané 20'	Report	Promes 85'; van Dijk 90+1'	Stadium: Veltins-Arena; Attendance: 42,186; Referee: Ovidiu Hațegan (Romania)

==== UEFA Euro 2020 qualifying ====
===== UEFA Euro 2020 qualifying Group C =====
Pos	Team	Pld	W	D	L	GF	GA	GD	Pts	Qualification	(Germany)	(Netherlands)	(Northern Ireland)	(Belarus)	(Estonia)
1	Germany	8	7	0	1	30	7	+23	21	Qualify for final tournament	—	2–4	6–1	4–0	8–0
2	Netherlands	8	6	1	1	24	7	+17	19	Qualify for final tournament	2–3	—	3–1	4–0	5–0
3	Northern Ireland	8	4	1	3	9	13	−4	13	Advance to play-offs via Nations League	0–2	0–0	—	2–1	2–0
4	Belarus	8	1	1	6	4	16	−12	4	Advance to play-offs via Nations League	0–2	1–2	0–1	—	0–0
5	Estonia	8	0	1	7	2	26	−24	1		0–3	0–4	1–2	1–2	—

Source: UEFA
Rules for classification: Qualification tiebreakers

===== UEFA Euro 2020 qualifying fixtures and results =====
Win Draw Loss

24 March 2019 UEFA Euro 2020 qualifying	Netherlands	2–3	Germany	Amsterdam, Netherlands
20:45 (20:45 UTC+1)	de Ligt 48'; Depay 63'	Report	Sané 15'; Gnabry 34'; Schulz 90'	Stadium: Johan Cruyff Arena; Attendance: 51,694; Referee: Jesús Gil Manzano (Spain)

8 June 2019 UEFA Euro 2020 qualifying	Belarus	0–2	Germany	Barysaw, Belarus
20:45 (20:45 UTC+2)		Report	Sané 13'; Reus 62'	Stadium: Borisov Arena; Referee: Srđan Jovanović (Serbia)

11 June 2019 UEFA Euro 2020 qualifying	Germany	8–0	Estonia	Mainz, Germany
20:45 (20:45 UTC+2)	Reus 10', 37'; Gnabry 17', 62'; Goretzka 20'; Gündoğan 26' (pen.); Werner 79'; Sané 88'	Report		Stadium: Opel Arena; Attendance: 26,050; Referee: Ali Palabıyık (Turkey)

==== Friendly matches ====
Win Draw Loss

9 September 2018 Friendly	Germany	2–1	Peru	Sinsheim, Germany
20:45 (20:45 UTC+2)	Brandt 25'; Schulz 85'	Report	Advíncula 22'	Stadium: Wirsol Rhein-Neckar-Arena; Attendance: 25,494; Referee: Robert Schörgenhofer (Austria)

15 November 2018 Friendly	Germany	3–0	Russia	Leipzig, Germany
20:45 (20:45 UTC+1)	Sané 8'; Süle 25'; Gnabry 40'	Report		Stadium: Red Bull Arena; Attendance: 35,288; Referee: Sandro Schärer (Switzerland)

20 March 2019 Friendly	Germany	1–1	Serbia	Wolfsburg, Germany
20:45 (20:45 UTC+1)	Goretzka 69'	Report	Jović 12'	Stadium: Volkswagen Arena; Attendance: 26,101; Referee: Bobby Madden (Scotland)

=== Germany women's national football team ===
==== Kits ====
Old home	Old away	New home	New away	New home alt.

==== 2019 FIFA Women's World Cup qualification ====
===== 2019 FIFA Women's World Cup qualification Group 5 =====
Pos	Team	Pld	W	D	L	GF	GA	GD	Pts	Qualification	Germany	Iceland	Czech Republic	Slovenia	Faroe Islands
1	Germany	8	7	0	1	38	3	+35	21	2019 FIFA Women's World Cup	—	2–3	4–0	6–0	11–0
2	Iceland	8	5	2	1	22	6	+16	17		0–2	—	1–1	2–0	8–0
3	Czech Republic	8	4	2	2	20	8	+12	14		0–1	1–1	—	2–0	4–1
4	Slovenia	8	2	0	6	9	20	−11	6		0–4	0–2	0–4	—	5–0
5	Faroe Islands	8	0	0	8	1	53	−52	0		0–8	0–5	0–8	0–4	—

Source: UEFA
Rules for classification: Qualification tiebreakers

===== 2019 FIFA Women's World Cup qualification fixtures and results =====
Win Draw Loss

1 September 2018 2019 FIFA World Cup qualification	Iceland	0–2	Germany	Reykjavík, Iceland
16:55 (14:55 UTC±0)		Report	Huth 42', 74'	Stadium: Laugardalsvöllur; Referee: Pernilla Larsson (Sweden)

4 September 2018 2019 FIFA World Cup qualification	Faroe Islands	0–8	Germany	Tórshavn, Faroe Islands
17:00 (16:00 UTC+1)		Report	Schüller 3'; Magull 25', 68'; Maier 27'; Simon 58', 73'; Popp 71', 90+2'	Stadium: Tórsvøllur; Attendance: 651; Referee: Lizzy van der Helm (Netherlands)

==== 2019 FIFA Women's World Cup ====
===== 2019 FIFA Women's World Cup Group B =====
Pos	Team	Pld	W	D	L	GF	GA	GD	Pts	Qualification
1	Germany	3	3	0	0	6	0	+6	9	Advance to knockout stage
2	Spain	3	1	1	1	3	2	+1	4	Advance to knockout stage
3	China	3	1	1	1	1	1	0	4	Advance to knockout stage
4	South Africa	3	0	0	3	1	8	−7	0	

Source: FIFA
Rules for classification: Group stage tiebreakers

===== 2019 FIFA Women's World Cup fixtures and results =====
Win Draw Loss

8 June 2019 Group B	Germany	1–0	China	Rennes, France
15:00 (15:00 UTC+2)	Gwinn 66'	Report		Stadium: Roazhon Park; Attendance: 15,283; Referee: Marie-Soleil Beaudoin (Canada)

12 June 2019 Group B	Germany	1–0	Spain	Valenciennes, France
18:00 (18:00 UTC+2)	Däbritz 42'	Report		Stadium: Stade du Hainaut; Attendance: 20,761; Referee: Kateryna Monzul (Ukraine)

17 June 2019 Group B	South Africa	0–4	Germany	Montpellier, France
18:00 (18:00 UTC+2)		Report	Leupolz 14'; Däbritz 29'; Popp 40'; Magull 58'	Stadium: Stade de la Mosson; Attendance: 15,502; Referee: Sandra Braz (Portugal)

22 June 2019 Round of 16	Germany	3–0	Nigeria	Grenoble, France
17:30 (17:30 UTC+2)	Popp 20'; Däbritz 27' (pen.); Schüller 82'	Report		Stadium: Stade des Alpes; Attendance: 17,988; Referee: Yoshimi Yamashita (Japan)

29 June 2019 Quarter-final	Germany	1–2	Sweden	Rennes, France
18:30 (18:30 UTC+2)	Magull 16'	Report	Jakobsson 22'; Blackstenius 48'	Stadium: Roazhon Park; Attendance: 25,301; Referee: Stéphanie Frappart (France)

==== Friendly matches ====
Win Draw Loss

6 October 2018 Friendly	Germany	3–1	Austria	Essen, Germany
14:00 (14:00 UTC+2)	Popp 8'; Dallmann 56'; Schüller 84'	Report	Billa 34'	Stadium: Stadion Essen; Attendance: 3,569; Referee: Monika Mularczyk (Poland)

10 November 2018 Friendly	Germany	5–2	Italy	Osnabrück, Germany
16:00 (16:00 UTC+1)	Magull 6'; Däbritz 18'; Gwinn 50'; Petermann 60'; Maier 86'	Report	Bonansea 29'; Sabatino 43'	Stadium: Stadion an der Bremer Brücke; Attendance: 5,900; Referee: Ivana Martinčić (Croatia)

13 November 2018 Friendly	Germany	0–0	Spain	Erfurt, Germany
16:00 (16:00 UTC+1)		Report		Stadium: Steigerwaldstadion; Attendance: 3,169; Referee: Tess Olofsson (Sweden)

28 February 2019 Friendly	France	0–1	Germany	Laval, France
21:00 (21:00 UTC+1)		Report	Schüller 31'	Stadium: Stade Francis Le Basser; Attendance: 10,238; Referee: Kateryna Monzul (Ukraine)

6 April 2019 Friendly	Sweden	1–2	Germany	Solna, Sweden
13:45 (13:45 UTC+2)	Seger 72' (pen.)	Report	Hendrich 51'; Dallmann 65'	Stadium: Friends Arena; Attendance: 25,882; Referee: Lina Lehtovaara (Finland)

9 April 2019 Friendly	Germany	2–2	Japan	Paderborn, Germany
16:00 (16:00 UTC+2)	Popp 53'; Huth 72'	Report	Hasegawa 35'; Yokoyama 69'	Stadium: Benteler-Arena; Attendance: 4,804; Referee: Esther Staubli (Switzerland)

30 May 2019 Friendly	Germany	2–0	Chile	Regensburg, Germany
17:45 (17:45 UTC+2)	Popp 29'; Simon 45+2'	Report		Stadium: Continental Arena; Attendance: 10,135; Referee: Lina Lehtovaara (Finland)

== League season ==
=== Men ===
==== Bundesliga ====
===== Bundesliga standings =====
Pos	Team	Pld	W	D	L	GF	GA	GD	Pts	Qualification or relegation
1	Bayern Munich (C)	34	24	6	4	88	32	+56	78	Qualification for the Champions League group stage
2	Borussia Dortmund	34	23	7	4	81	44	+37	76	Qualification for the Champions League group stage
3	RB Leipzig	34	19	9	6	63	29	+34	66	Qualification for the Champions League group stage
4	Bayer Leverkusen	34	18	4	12	69	52	+17	58	Qualification for the Champions League group stage
5	Borussia Mönchengladbach	34	16	7	11	55	42	+13	55	Qualification for the Europa League group stage (Note: Since the winners of the 2018–19 DFB-Pokal, Bayern Munich, qualified for the Champions League based on league position, the Europa League group stage spot was passed to the sixth-placed team, and the Europa League second qualifying round spot was passed to the seventh-placed team.)
6	VfL Wolfsburg	34	16	7	11	62	50	+12	55	Qualification for the Europa League group stage
7	Eintracht Frankfurt	34	15	9	10	60	48	+12	54	Qualification for the Europa League second qualifying round
8	Werder Bremen	34	14	11	9	58	49	+9	53	
9	1899 Hoffenheim	34	13	12	9	70	52	+18	51	
10	Fortuna Düsseldorf	34	13	5	16	49	65	−16	44	
11	Hertha BSC	34	11	10	13	49	57	−8	43	
12	Mainz 05	34	12	7	15	46	57	−11	43	
13	SC Freiburg	34	8	12	14	46	61	−15	36	
14	Schalke 04	34	8	9	17	37	55	−18	33	
15	FC Augsburg	34	8	8	18	51	71	−20	32	
16	VfB Stuttgart (R)	34	7	7	20	32	70	−38	28	Qualification for the relegation play-offs
17	Hannover 96 (R)	34	5	6	23	31	71	−40	21	Relegation to 2. Bundesliga
18	1. FC Nürnberg (R)	34	3	10	21	26	68	−42	19	Relegation to 2. Bundesliga

Source: DFB
Rules for classification: 1) Points; 2) Goal difference; 3) Goals scored; 4) Head-to-head results; 5) Head-to-head away goals scored; 6) Away goals scored; 7) Play-off
(C) Champions; (R) Relegated

===== Relegation play-offs =====
All times are CEST (UTC+2).

====== First leg ======
23 May 2019
20:30

VfB Stuttgart	2–2	Union Berlin
Gentner 41'; Gómez 51'	Report	Abdullahi 43'; Friedrich 68'

Mercedes-Benz Arena, Stuttgart
Attendance: 58,619
Referee: Bastian Dankert

====== Second leg ======
27 May 2019
20:30

Union Berlin	0–0	VfB Stuttgart
	Report

Stadion An der Alten Försterei, Berlin
Attendance: 22,012
Referee: Christian Dingert

2–2 on aggregate. Union Berlin won on away goals and are promoted to the Bundesliga, while VfB Stuttgart are relegated to the 2. Bundesliga.

==== 2. Bundesliga ====
===== 2. Bundesliga standings =====
Pos	Team	Pld	W	D	L	GF	GA	GD	Pts	Promotion, qualification or relegation
1	1. FC Köln (C, P)	34	19	6	9	84	47	+37	63	Promotion to Bundesliga
2	SC Paderborn (P)	34	16	9	9	76	50	+26	57	Promotion to Bundesliga
3	Union Berlin (O, P)	34	14	15	5	54	33	+21	57	Qualification to promotion play-offs
4	Hamburger SV	34	16	8	10	45	42	+3	56	
5	1. FC Heidenheim	34	15	10	9	55	45	+10	55	
6	Holstein Kiel	34	13	10	11	60	51	+9	49	
7	Arminia Bielefeld	34	13	10	11	52	50	+2	49	
8	Jahn Regensburg	34	12	13	9	55	54	+1	49	
9	FC St. Pauli	34	14	7	13	46	53	−7	49	
10	Darmstadt 98	34	13	7	14	45	53	−8	46	
11	VfL Bochum	34	11	11	12	49	50	−1	44	
12	Dynamo Dresden	34	11	9	14	41	48	−7	42	
13	Greuther Fürth	34	10	12	12	37	56	−19	42	
14	Erzgebirge Aue	34	11	7	16	43	47	−4	40	
15	SV Sandhausen	34	9	11	14	45	52	−7	38	
16	FC Ingolstadt (R)	34	9	8	17	43	55	−12	35	Qualification to relegation play-offs
17	1. FC Magdeburg (R)	34	6	13	15	35	53	−18	31	Relegation to 3. Liga
18	MSV Duisburg (R)	34	6	10	18	39	65	−26	28	Relegation to 3. Liga

Source: DFB
Rules for classification: 1) Points; 2) Goal difference; 3) Goals scored; 4) Head-to-head points; 5) Head-to-head goal difference; 6) Head-to-head goals scored; 7) Head-to-head away goals scored; 8) Away goals scored; 9) Play-off.
(C) Champions; (O) Play-off winners; (P) Promoted; (R) Relegated

===== Relegation play-offs =====
All times are CEST (UTC+2).

====== First leg ======
24 May 2019
18:15

Wehen Wiesbaden	1–2	FC Ingolstadt
Kyereh 90+6'	Report	Lezcano 1', 47' (pen.)

Brita-Arena, Wiesbaden
Attendance: 7,698
Referee: Guido Winkmann

====== Second leg ======
28 May 2019
18:15

FC Ingolstadt	2–3	Wehen Wiesbaden
Kerschbaumer 13'; Paulsen 68'	Report	Kyereh 11'; Dittgen 30'; Paulsen 43' (o.g.)

Audi Sportpark, Ingolstadt
Attendance: 12,420
Referee: Frank Willenborg

4–4 on aggregate. Wehen Wiesbaden won on away goals and are promoted to the 2. Bundesliga, while FC Ingolstadt are relegated to the 3. Liga.

==== 3. Liga ====
===== 3. Liga standings =====
Pos	Team	Pld	W	D	L	GF	GA	GD	Pts	Promotion, qualification or relegation
1	VfL Osnabrück (C, P)	38	22	10	6	56	31	+25	76	Promotion to 2. Bundesliga and qualification for DFB-Pokal
2	Karlsruher SC (P)	38	20	11	7	64	38	+26	71	Promotion to 2. Bundesliga and qualification for DFB-Pokal
3	Wehen Wiesbaden (O, P)	38	22	4	12	71	47	+24	70	Qualification for promotion play-offs and DFB-Pokal
4	Hallescher FC	38	19	9	10	47	34	+13	66	Qualification for DFB-Pokal
5	Würzburger Kickers	38	16	9	13	56	45	+11	57	
6	Hansa Rostock	38	14	13	11	47	46	+1	55	
7	FSV Zwickau	38	14	10	14	49	47	+2	52	
8	Preußen Münster	38	15	7	16	48	50	−2	52	
9	1. FC Kaiserslautern	38	13	12	13	49	51	−2	51	
10	SpVgg Unterhaching	38	11	15	12	53	46	+7	48	
11	KFC Uerdingen	38	14	6	18	47	62	−15	48	
12	1860 Munich	38	12	11	15	48	52	−4	47	
13	SV Meppen	38	13	8	17	48	53	−5	47	
14	Carl Zeiss Jena	38	11	13	14	48	57	−9	46	
15	Sonnenhof Großaspach	38	9	18	11	38	39	−1	45	
16	Eintracht Braunschweig	38	10	15	13	48	54	−6	45	
17	Energie Cottbus (R)	38	12	9	17	51	58	−7	45	Relegation to Regionalliga
18	Sportfreunde Lotte (R)	38	9	13	16	31	46	−15	40	Relegation to Regionalliga
19	Fortuna Köln (R)	38	9	12	17	38	64	−26	39	Relegation to Regionalliga
20	VfR Aalen (R)	38	6	13	19	45	62	−17	31	Relegation to Regionalliga

Source: DFB
Rules for classification: 1) Points; 2) Goal difference; 3) Goals scored; 4) Head-to-head results; 5) Head-to-head away goals scored; 6) Away goals scored; 7) Play-off.
(C) Champions; (O) Play-off winners; (P) Promoted; (R) Relegated

==== DFB-Pokal ====
===== Final =====
25 May 2019
20:00 CEST

RB Leipzig	0–3	Bayern Munich
	Report	Lewandowski 29', 85'; Coman 78'

Olympiastadion, Berlin
Attendance: 74,322
Referee: Tobias Stieler (Hamburg)

==== DFL-Supercup ====
12 August 2018
20:30 CEST

Eintracht Frankfurt	0–5	Bayern Munich
	Report	Lewandowski 21', 26', 54'; Coman 63'; Thiago 85'

Commerzbank-Arena, Frankfurt
Attendance: 51,500
Referee: Marco Fritz (Korb)

=== Women ===
==== Frauen-Bundesliga ====
===== Bundesliga standings =====
Pos	Team	Pld	W	D	L	GF	GA	GD	Pts	Qualification or relegation
1	VfL Wolfsburg (C)	22	19	2	1	94	11	+83	59	Qualification for Champions League
2	Bayern Munich	22	17	4	1	75	18	+57	55	Qualification for Champions League
3	Turbine Potsdam	22	12	6	4	59	25	+34	42	
4	SGS Essen	22	11	8	3	50	28	+22	41	
5	1. FFC Frankfurt	22	10	4	8	48	38	+10	34	
6	1899 Hoffenheim	22	9	6	7	48	29	+19	33	
7	SC Freiburg	22	7	5	10	41	33	+8	26	
8	SC Sand	22	6	7	9	29	40	−11	25	
9	MSV Duisburg	22	5	4	13	21	62	−41	19	
10	Bayer Leverkusen	22	5	3	14	22	75	−53	18	
11	Werder Bremen (R)	22	4	4	14	23	48	−25	16	Relegation to 2. Bundesliga
12	Borussia Mönchengladbach (R)	22	0	1	21	7	110	−103	1	Relegation to 2. Bundesliga

Source: DFB
Rules for classification: 1) Points; 2) Goal difference; 3) Goals scored; 4) Head-to-head points; 5) Head-to-head goal difference; 6) Head-to-head goals scored; 7) Head-to-head away goals scored; 8) Away goals scored; 9) Play-off.
(C) Champions; (R) Relegated

==== 2. Frauen-Bundesliga ====
===== 2. Bundesliga standings =====
Pos	Team	Pld	W	D	L	GF	GA	GD	Pts	Promotion or relegation
1	Bayern Munich II (Note: Reserve teams cannot compete in the Frauen-Bundesliga and therefore are ineligible for promotion.) (C)	26	16	5	5	67	27	+40	53	
2	VfL Wolfsburg II	26	16	2	8	42	26	+16	50	
3	1. FC Köln (P)	26	14	5	7	51	33	+18	47	Promotion to Bundesliga
4	USV Jena (P)	26	14	4	8	45	34	+11	46	Promotion to Bundesliga
5	SV Meppen	26	13	6	7	63	38	+25	45	
6	1899 Hoffenheim II	26	11	5	10	40	35	+5	38	
7	Turbine Potsdam II	26	11	4	11	56	46	+10	37	
8	1. FC Saarbrücken	26	9	9	8	55	43	+12	36	
9	FSV Gütersloh	26	9	6	11	37	42	−5	33	
10	1. FFC Frankfurt II	26	9	5	12	27	42	−15	32	
11	BV Cloppenburg	26	8	6	12	37	49	−12	30	
12	Hessen Wetzlar (R)	26	9	3	14	29	45	−16	30	Relegation to Regionalliga
13	SV Weinberg (R)	26	8	6	12	34	59	−25	30	Relegation to Regionalliga
14	SGS Essen II (R)	26	2	0	24	16	80	−64	6	Relegation to Regionalliga

Source: DFB
Rules for classification: 1) Points; 2) Goal difference; 3) Goals scored; 4) Head-to-head points; 5) Head-to-head goal difference; 6) Head-to-head goals scored; 7) Head-to-head away goals scored; 8) Away goals scored; 9) Play-off.
(C) Champions; (P) Promoted; (R) Relegated

==== DFB-Pokal Frauen ====
===== Final =====
1 May 2019
17:15 (UTC+2)

VfL Wolfsburg	1–0	SC Freiburg
Pajor 55'	Report

RheinEnergieStadion, Cologne
Attendance: 17,048
Referee: Susann Kunkel

== German clubs in Europe ==
=== UEFA Champions League ===
==== Group stage ====
===== Group A =====
Pos	Team	Pld	W	D	L	GF	GA	GD	Pts	Qualification	DOR	ATM	BRU	MON
1	(Germany) Borussia Dortmund	6	4	1	1	10	2	+8	13 (Note: Head-to-head goal difference: Borussia Dortmund +2, Atlético Madrid –2.)	Advance to knockout phase	—	4–0	0–0	3–0
2	(Spain) Atlético Madrid	6	4	1	1	9	6	+3	13	Advance to knockout phase	2–0	—	3–1	2–0
3	(Belgium) Club Brugge	6	1	3	2	6	5	+1	6	Transfer to Europa League	0–1	0–0	—	1–1
4	(France) Monaco	6	0	1	5	2	14	−12	1		0–2	1–2	0–4	—

Source: UEFA

===== Group D =====
Pos	Team	Pld	W	D	L	GF	GA	GD	Pts	Qualification	POR	SCH	GAL	LMO
1	(Portugal) Porto	6	5	1	0	15	6	+9	16	Advance to knockout phase	—	3–1	1–0	4–1
2	(Germany) Schalke 04	6	3	2	1	6	4	+2	11	Advance to knockout phase	1–1	—	2–0	1–0
3	(Turkey) Galatasaray	6	1	1	4	5	8	−3	4	Transfer to Europa League	2–3	0–0	—	3–0
4	(Russia) Lokomotiv Moscow	6	1	0	5	4	12	−8	3		1–3	0–1	2–0	—

Source: UEFA

===== Group E =====
Pos	Team	Pld	W	D	L	GF	GA	GD	Pts	Qualification	BAY	AJX	BEN	AEK
1	(Germany) Bayern Munich	6	4	2	0	15	5	+10	14	Advance to knockout phase	—	1–1	5–1	2–0
2	(Netherlands) Ajax	6	3	3	0	11	5	+6	12	Advance to knockout phase	3–3	—	1–0	3–0
3	(Portugal) Benfica	6	2	1	3	6	11	−5	7	Transfer to Europa League	0–2	1–1	—	1–0
4	(Greece) AEK Athens	6	0	0	6	2	13	−11	0		0–2	0–2	2–3	—

Source: UEFA

===== Group F =====
Pos	Team	Pld	W	D	L	GF	GA	GD	Pts	Qualification	MCI	LYO	SHK	HOF
1	(England) Manchester City	6	4	1	1	16	6	+10	13	Advance to knockout phase	—	1–2	6–0	2–1
2	(France) Lyon	6	1	5	0	12	11	+1	8	Advance to knockout phase	2–2	—	2–2	2–2
3	(Ukraine) Shakhtar Donetsk	6	1	3	2	8	16	−8	6	Transfer to Europa League	0–3	1–1	—	2–2
4	(Germany) TSG Hoffenheim	6	0	3	3	11	14	−3	3		1–2	3–3	2–3	—

Source: UEFA

==== Knockout phase ====
===== Round of 16 =====
Team 1	Agg.	Team 2	1st leg	2nd leg
Schalke 04 (Germany)	2–10	(England) Manchester City	2–3	0–7
Tottenham Hotspur (England)	4–0	(Germany) Borussia Dortmund	3–0	1–0
Liverpool (England)	3–1	(Germany) Bayern Munich	0–0	3–1

=== UEFA Europa League ===
==== Qualifying phase and play-off round ====
===== Second qualifying round =====
Team 1	Agg.	Team 2	1st leg	2nd leg
RB Leipzig (Germany)	5–1	(Sweden) BK Häcken	4–0	1–1

===== Third qualifying round =====
Team 1	Agg.	Team 2	1st leg	2nd leg
RB Leipzig (Germany)	4–2	(Romania) Universitatea Craiova	3–1	1–1

===== Play-off round =====
Team 1	Agg.	Team 2	1st leg	2nd leg
Zorya Luhansk (Ukraine)	2–3	(Germany) RB Leipzig	0–0	2–3

==== Group stage ====
===== Group A =====
Pos	Team	Pld	W	D	L	GF	GA	GD	Pts	Qualification	LEV	ZUR	AKL	LUD
1	(Germany) Bayer Leverkusen	6	4	1	1	16	9	+7	13	Advance to knockout phase	—	1–0	4–2	1–1
2	(Switzerland) Zürich	6	3	1	2	7	6	+1	10	Advance to knockout phase	3–2	—	1–2	1–0
3	(Cyprus) AEK Larnaca	6	1	2	3	6	12	−6	5		1–5	0–1	—	1–1
4	(Bulgaria) Ludogorets Razgrad	6	0	4	2	5	7	−2	4		2–3	1–1	0–0	—

Source: UEFA
Rules for classification: Group stage tiebreakers

===== Group B =====
Pos	Team	Pld	W	D	L	GF	GA	GD	Pts	Qualification	SAL	CEL	RBL	ROS
1	(Austria) Red Bull Salzburg	6	6	0	0	17	6	+11	18	Advance to knockout phase	—	3–1	1–0	3–0
2	(Scotland) Celtic	6	3	0	3	6	8	−2	9	Advance to knockout phase	1–2	—	2–1	1–0
3	(Germany) RB Leipzig	6	2	1	3	9	8	+1	7		2–3	2–0	—	1–1
4	(Norway) Rosenborg	6	0	1	5	4	14	−10	1		2–5	0–1	1–3	—

Source: UEFA
Rules for classification: Group stage tiebreakers

===== Group H =====
Pos	Team	Pld	W	D	L	GF	GA	GD	Pts	Qualification	FRA	LAZ	APL	MAR
1	(Germany) Eintracht Frankfurt	6	6	0	0	17	5	+12	18	Advance to knockout phase	—	4–1	2–0	4–0
2	(Italy) Lazio	6	3	0	3	9	11	−2	9	Advance to knockout phase	1–2	—	2–1	2–1
3	(Cyprus) Apollon Limassol	6	2	1	3	10	10	0	7		2–3	2–0	—	2–2
4	(France) Marseille	6	0	1	5	6	16	−10	1		1–2	1–3	1–3	—

Source: UEFA
Rules for classification: Group stage tiebreakers

==== Knockout phase ====
===== Round of 32 =====
Team 1	Agg.	Team 2	1st leg	2nd leg
Krasnodar (Russia)	1–1 (a)	(Germany) Bayer Leverkusen	0–0	1–1
Shakhtar Donetsk (Ukraine)	3–6	(Germany) Eintracht Frankfurt	2–2	1–4

===== Round of 16 =====
Team 1	Agg.	Team 2	1st leg	2nd leg
Eintracht Frankfurt (Germany)	1–0	(Italy) Inter Milan	0–0	1–0

===== Quarter-finals =====
Team 1	Agg.	Team 2	1st leg	2nd leg
Benfica (Portugal)	4–4 (a)	(Germany) Eintracht Frankfurt	4–2	0–2

===== Semi-finals =====
Team 1	Agg.	Team 2	1st leg	2nd leg
Eintracht Frankfurt (Germany)	2–2 (3–4 p)	(England) Chelsea	1–1	1–1 (a.e.t.)

=== UEFA Women's Champions League ===
==== Knockout phase ====
===== Round of 32 =====
Team 1	Agg.	Team 2	1st leg	2nd leg
Þór/KA (Iceland)	0–3	(Germany) VfL Wolfsburg	0–1	0–2
Spartak Subotica (Serbia)	0–11	(Germany) Bayern Munich	0–7	0–4

===== Round of 16 =====
Team 1	Agg.	Team 2	1st leg	2nd leg
Zürich (Switzerland)	0–5	(Germany) Bayern Munich	0–2	0–3
VfL Wolfsburg (Germany)	10–0	(Spain) Atlético Madrid	4–0	6–0

===== Quarter-finals =====
Team 1	Agg.	Team 2	1st leg	2nd leg
Slavia Praha (Czech Republic)	2–6	(Germany) Bayern Munich	1–1	1–5
Lyon (France)	6–3	(Germany) VfL Wolfsburg	2–1	4–2

===== Semi-finals =====
Team 1	Agg.	Team 2	1st leg	2nd leg
Bayern Munich (Germany)	0–2	(Spain) Barcelona	0–1	0–1
