= Sara Agrež =

Slovenian footballer (born 2000)

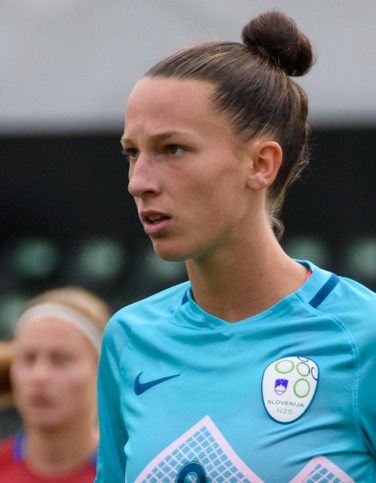
- Agrež with Slovenia in 2018

Personal information
- Date of birth: 9 December 2000 (age 25)
- Place of birth: Žalec, Slovenia
- Height: 1.72 m (5 ft 8 in)
- Position: Defender

Team information
- Current team: Liverpool
- Number: 23

Senior career*
Years	Team	Apps	(Gls)
2016–2017	ŽNK Rudar Škale	7	(2)
2017–2018	ŽNK Radomlje	15	(5)
2018–2019	Pomurje	16	(7)
2019–2022	Turbine Potsdam	43	(4)
2019	Turbine Potsdam II	2	(0)
2022–2024	VfL Wolfsburg	9	(0)
2023	VfL Wolfsburg II	6	(2)
2024–2026	1. FC Köln	46	(1)
2026–	Liverpool	3	(0)

International career^{‡}
2017–	Slovenia	63	(3)
- * Club domestic league appearances and goals as of 16:06, 21 November 2026 (UTC) ‡ National team caps and goals as of 06:50, 9 September 2026 (UTC)

Sara Agrež (born 9 December 2000) is a Slovenian professional footballer who plays as a defender for Women's Super League club Liverpool and the Slovenia national team.

== Club career ==
Agrež started her career at ŽNK Žalec and joined ŽNK Rudar Škale in the 2014–15 winter break. At Škale, she qualified for the first team at the age of 16 and made her Slovenian Cup debut on 12 March 2017. In the 1–0 win over ŽNK Ankaran, she scored the decisive goal. After her debut season, in which she played in seven games, she moved to ŽNK Radomlje and a year later signed with league rivals ŽNK Pomurje Beltinci. On May 10, 2019, Agrež moved to Germany to join Bundesliga side Turbine Potsdam. In 2022, she signed to join VfL Wolfsburg. She was used since the first day of the championship, taking over for Felicitas Rauch in the 66th minute in the home match won 4–0 over the opponents of SGS Essen, then making her debut in the Champions League, as a starter, on 20 October 2022 in the match won 4–0 over the Austrians of St. Pölten, the first match of group B of the group stage of the 2022–2023 edition.

On 21 May 2026, Agrež was announced at Liverpool ahead of the 2026–27 season.

== International career ==
Agrež was called up by the Slovenian Football Federation in 2015 at age 14 to the Under-17 team for the qualifiers for the 2016 European Championship in Belarus. She was used in two of the three matches of the first phase where her national team, despite having the same number of points (6) with two wins and one defeat, failed to pass the round due to a worse goal difference than Switzerland and Serbia. She also remained at altitude for the subsequent qualification for the 2017 European Championship in the Czech Republic, taking the field in all six matches of the two phases, where Slovenia got a good performance by closing the elite phase in second position one point from the Netherlands, however not enough to access the final phase.

After she had played for the U-19 team in the qualifiers for the 2018 U19 European Championship, Agrež was called up to the senior team for the first time on May 25, 2017. She earned a cap for the Slovenia national team, making her debut with the first in the two-legged friendly against Albania on June 6 and 9, and appearing for the team during the 2019 World Cup qualifying cycle.

== Personal ==
Agrež graduated from Gimnazija Šiška in Ljubljana in the summer of 2018.

== Career statistics ==
=== Club ===
As of match played 14 November 2026

Appearances and goals by club, season and competition
Club	Season	League			National cup (Note: Includes Slovenian Women's Cup, DFB-Pokal Frauen,Women's FA Cup)		League cup (Note: Includes WSL Players Cup)		Continental		Total	
Club	Season	Division	Apps	Goals	Apps	Goals	Apps	Goals	Apps	Goals	Apps	Goals
ŽNK Rudar Škale	2016–17	SŽNL	7	2	2	1	—		—		9	3
ŽNK Radomlje	2017–18	SŽNL	16	5	1	0	—		—		17	5
Pomurje	2018–19	SŽNL	16	7	2	1	—		—		18	8
Turbine Potsdam	2019–20	Frauen-Bundesliga	11	2	1	0	—		—		12	2
Turbine Potsdam	2020–21	Frauen-Bundesliga	16	1	1	0	—		—		17	1
Turbine Potsdam	2021–22	Frauen-Bundesliga	16	1	4	0	—		—		20	1
Turbine Potsdam	Total		43	4	6	0	0	0	0	0	49	4
VfL Wolfsburg	2022–23	Frauen-Bundesliga	7	0	0	0	—		1	0	8	0
VfL Wolfsburg	2023–24	Frauen-Bundesliga	2	0	0	0	—		0	0	2	0
VfL Wolfsburg	Total		9	0	0	0	0	0	1	0	10	0
1. FC Köln	2023–24	Frauen-Bundesliga	11	0	0	0	—		—		11	0
1. FC Köln	2024–25	Frauen-Bundesliga	10	0	1	0	—		—		11	0
1. FC Köln	2025–26	Frauen-Bundesliga	25	1	0	0	—		—		26	1
1. FC Köln	Total		46	1	1	0	0	0	0	0	47	1
Liverpool	2026–27	Women's Super League	3	0	0	0	3	0	—		6	0
Career total			140	19	12	5	1	0	1	0	157	21

=== International ===
As of match played 9 June 2026

Appearances and goals by national team and year
National team	Year	Apps	Goals
Slovenia	2017	4	1
Slovenia	2018	4	0
Slovenia	2019	8	0
Slovenia	2020	2	0
Slovenia	2021	4	1
Slovenia	2022	6	0
Slovenia	2023	9	0
Slovenia	2024	8	1
Slovenia	2025	12	0
Slovenia	2026	6	0
Total		63	3

Scores and results list Slovenia's goal tally first, score column indicates score after each Agrež goal.

List of international goals scored by Sara Agrež
No.	Date	Venue	Opponent	Score	Result	Competition
1	24 November 2017	Ajdovščina Stadium, Ajdovščina, Slovenia	Faroe Islands	2–0	5–0	2019 FIFA Women's World Cup qualification
2	17 September 2021	Pärnu Rannastaadion, Pärnu, Estonia	Estonia	4–0	4–0	2023 FIFA Women's World Cup qualification
3	31 May 2024	Fazanerija City Stadium, Murska Sobota, Slovenia	Latvia	1–0	6–0	UEFA Women's Euro 2025 qualifying
