= Marina Fedorova (footballer) =

Russian beach soccer and footballer

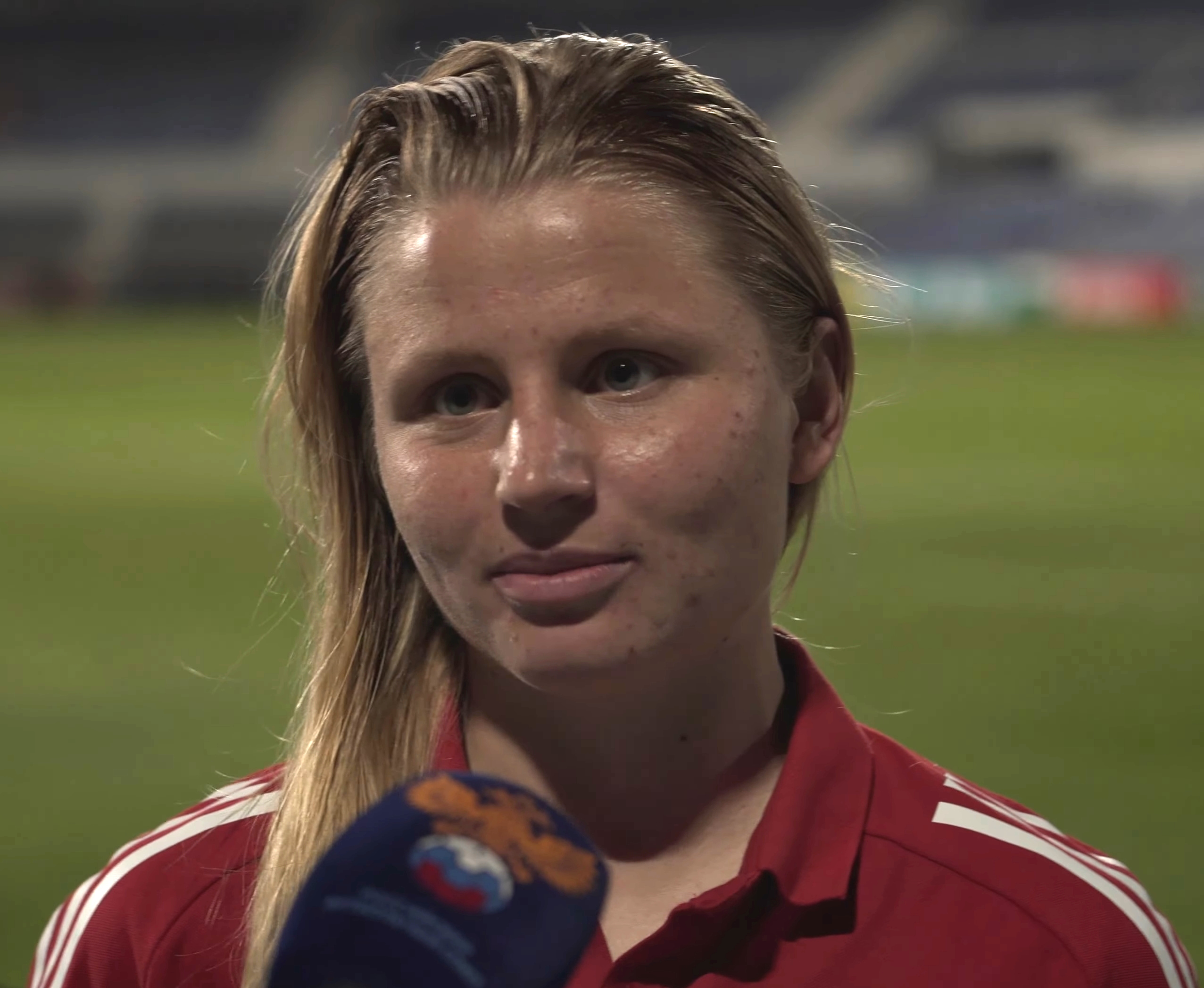
- Fedorova in April 2021

Personal information
- Full name: Marina Fedorova
- Date of birth: 10 May 1997 (age 29)
- Place of birth: Sevastopol, Ukraine
- Height: 1.65 m (5 ft 5 in)
- Position: Forward

Team information
- Current team: Lokomotiv Moscow

Senior career*
| Years | Team | Apps | (Gls) |
| 2015 | FC Zorky | 6 | (4) |
| 2016 | NiceFutis | 7 | (5) |
| 2017 | Ryazan VDV | 14 | (4) |
| 2018 | FK Yenisey Krasnoyarsk | 11 | (3) |
| 2019 | FC Metz | 4 | (0) |
| 2019–2020 | Real Betis | 8 | (0) |
| 2020– | Lokomotiv Moscow | 33 | (7) |

International career^{‡}
| 2015–2016 | Russia U-19 | 3 | (7) |
| 2015– | Russia | 28 | (7) |
| 2018– | Russia (beach) | 3 | (3) |
Medal record
Women's football
Representing Russia
Summer Universiade
| Bronze medal – third place | 2017 Taipei | Women's |
Women's beach soccer
Representing Russia
Euro Beach Soccer Cup
| Gold medal – first place | 2018 Nazaré | Women's |
| Gold medal – first place | 2019 Nazaré | Women's |
- * Club domestic league appearances and goals as of 23 August 2020 ‡ National team caps and goals as of 01:45, 04 June 2019

Marina Maksimovna Fedorova (Russian: Марина Максимовна Фёдорова; born 10 May 1997) is a Russian beach soccer and footballer who currently plays for Lokomotiv Moscow in the Russian Women's Football Championship. She has previously played for the Russian side FC Zorky and NiceFutis in the Finnish women's premier division Naisten Liiga.

Fedorova made her debut for the Russia women's national football team in October 2015 against Germany.

== Awards ==
=== Beach soccer ===
- Women's Euro Beach Soccer Cup

- Winner (2): 2018, 2019

==== Individual ====
- Women's Euro Beach Soccer Cup (MVP) (2): 2018, 2019
- Women's Euro Beach Soccer Cup (Top Scorer) (1): 2019
- 2018 Best Women's Player
- Top Scorer of the 2016 Women's Euro Winners Cup

== International goals ==
| No. | Date | Venue | Opponent | Score | Result | Competition |
|---|---|---|---|---|---|---|
| 1. | 11 June 2017 | Saturn Stadium, Ramenskoye, Russia | Serbia | 2–0 | 2–0 | Friendly |
| 2. | 30 August 2018 | Sapsan Arena, Moscow, Russia | Kazakhstan | 1–0 | 3–0 | 2019 FIFA Women's World Cup qualification |
| 3. | 3 September 2019 | Sapsan Arena, Moscow, Russia | Estonia | 2–0 | 4–0 | UEFA Women's Euro 2022 qualifying |
| 4. | 6 March 2020 | Brita-Arena, Wiesbaden, Germany | Kosovo | 4–0 | 5–0 | UEFA Women's Euro 2022 qualifying |
| 5. | 27 November 2020 | Arslan Zeki Demirci Sports Complex, Manavgat, Turkey | Kosovo | 1–0 | 3–0 | UEFA Women's Euro 2022 qualifying |
| 6. | 27 November 2020 | Arslan Zeki Demirci Sports Complex, Manavgat, Turkey | Kosovo | 3–0 | 3–0 | UEFA Women's Euro 2022 qualifying |
| 7. | 1 December 2020 | Arslan Zeki Demirci Sports Complex, Manavgat, Turkey | Turkey | 2–0 | 2–1 | UEFA Women's Euro 2022 qualifying |
| 8. | 17 September 2021 | Sportivnyy Gorodok, Moscow, Russia | Azerbaijan | 1–0 | 2–0 | 2023 FIFA Women's World Cup qualification |
| 9. | 25 November 2021 | Dalga Arena, Baku, Azerbaijan | Azerbaijan | 1–0 | 4–0 | 2023 FIFA Women's World Cup qualification |
| 10. | 27 February 2024 | Belek Football Training Camp, Antalya, Turkey | Botswana | 2–0 | 4–0 | Friendly |
| 11. | 4 April 2024 | Belek Football Training Camp, Antalya, Turkey | Ecuador | 4–0 | 4–0 | Friendly |
| 12. | 28 November 2024 | Fisht Olympic Stadium, Sochi, Russia | Azerbaijan | 1–0 | 1–0 | Friendly |
