= Tereza Szewieczková =

Czech footballer

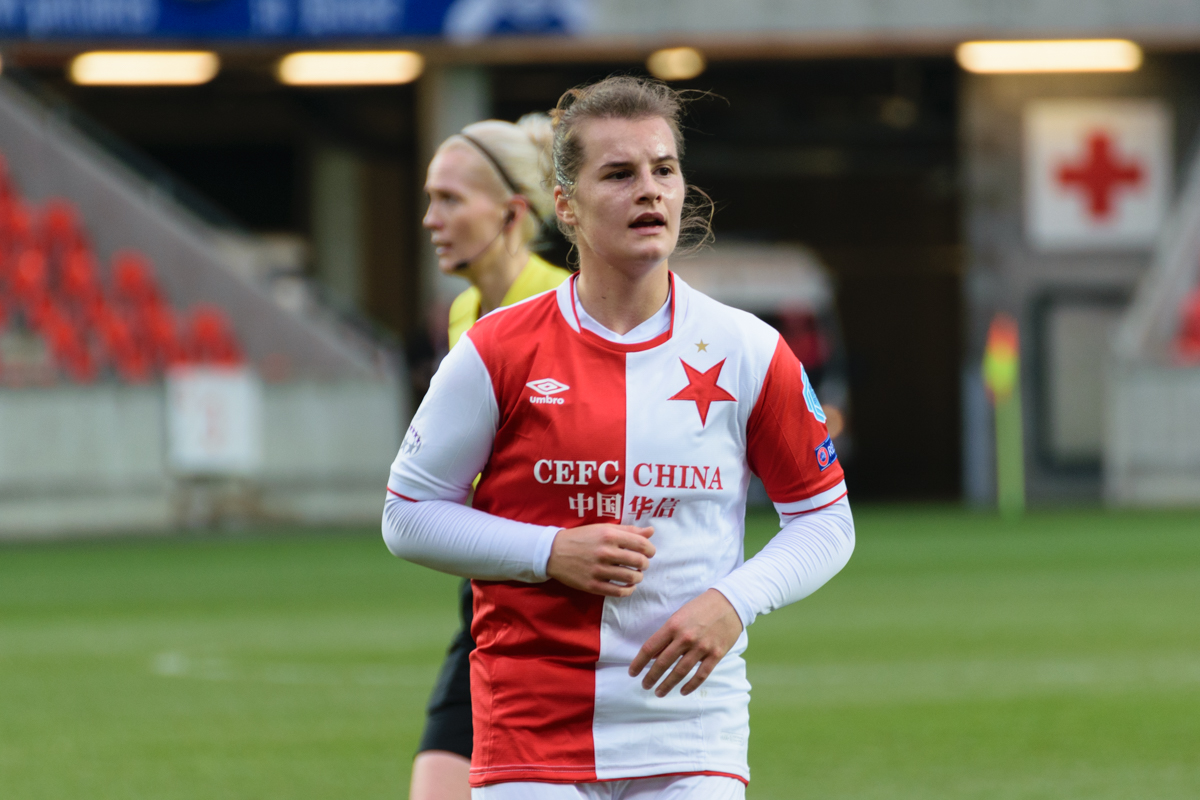
- Szewieczková in 2018

Personal information
- Full name: Tereza Szewieczková
- Date of birth: 4 May 1998 (age 28)
- Place of birth: Havířov, Czech Republic
- Height: 1.62 m (5 ft 4 in)
- Position: Striker

Team information
- Current team: Slavia Praha
- Number: 16

Youth career
- Vítkovice
- Sparta Prague

Senior career*
Years	Team	Apps	(Gls)
2013–2016	Sparta Prague		
2016–	Slavia Praha		

International career^{‡}
2017–	Czech Republic	36	(9)
- * Club domestic league appearances and goals ‡ National team caps and goals as of 4 December 2022

Tereza Szewieczková (born 4 May 1998) is a Czech football striker, currently playing for Slavia Praha in the Czech First Division.

== Career ==
Szewieczková was voted talent of the year at the 2014 Czech Women's Footballer of the Year.

She was an Under 19 international.

== Honours ==
Slavia Prague

- Czech First Division (5): 2016–17, 2019–20, 2021–22, 2022–23, 2023–24
- Czech Cup (3): 2022, 2023, 2024

Sparta Prague

- Czech Cup: 2015

== International goals ==
Statistics accurate as of match played 4 Dec 2022.

No.	Date	Venue	Opponent	Score	Result	Competition
1.	7 March 2018	GSZ Stadium, Larnaca, Cyprus	Slovakia	4–2	5–2	2018 Cyprus Women's Cup
2.	4 September 2018	Laugardalsvollur, Reykjavík, Iceland	Iceland	1–0	1–1	2019 FIFA Women's World Cup qualification
3.	27 February 2019	Pyla Stadium, Pyla, Cyprus	North Korea	3–2	4–2	2019 Cyprus Women's Cup
4.	12 November 2019	Střelecký Ostrov, České Budějovice, Czech Republic	England	1–0	2–3	Friendly
5.	12 November 2019	Střelecký Ostrov, České Budějovice, Czech Republic	England	2–2	2–3	Friendly
6.	14 June 2019	Letní stadion, Chomutov, Czech Republic	Russia	2–0	2–0	Friendly
7.	27 October 2020	Letní stadion, Chomutov, Czech Republic	Azerbaijan	3–0	3–0	UEFA Women's Euro 2022 qualifying
8.	24 June 2022	Čukarički Stadium, Belgrade, Serbia	Belarus	1–2	1–2	2023 FIFA Women's World Cup qualification
9.	1 September 2022	AEK Arena – Georgios Karapatakis, Larnaca, Cyprus	Cyprus	4–0	6–0	2023 FIFA Women's World Cup qualification
10.	6 April 2023	Letní stadion, Chomutov, Czech Republic	Morocco	1–0	2–0	Friendly
11.	6 April 2023	Letní stadion, Chomutov, Czech Republic	Morocco	2–0	2–0	Friendly
