= Kristin Demann =

German football defender

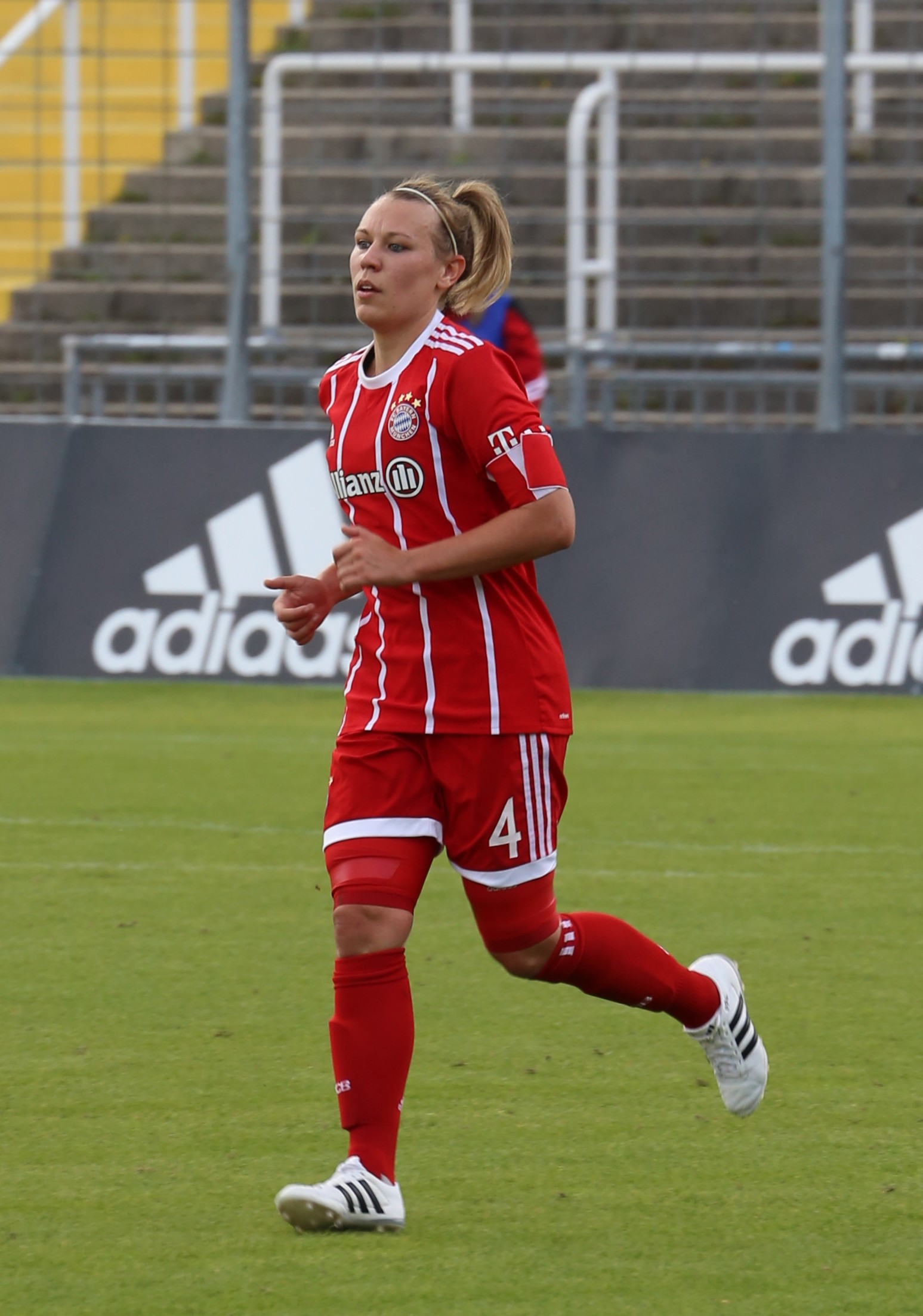
- Demann with Bayern Munich in 2017

Personal information
- Full name: Kristin Marion Demann
- Date of birth: 7 April 1993 (age 33)
- Place of birth: Gehrden, Germany
- Height: 1.69 m (5 ft 7 in)
- Position: Defender

Senior career*
Years	Team	Apps	(Gls)
2009–2013	Turbine Potsdam II	34	(4)
2010–2013	Turbine Potsdam	5	(1)
2013–2017	TSG Hoffenheim	87	(10)
2017–2022	Bayern Munich	47	(3)
2022	→ 1. FC Köln (loan)	8	(0)
2022–2025	VfL Wolfsburg	11	(0)
Total		192	(18)

International career^{‡}
2007–2008	Germany U15	4	(1)
2009	Germany U16	6	(0)
2009–2010	Germany U17	13	(1)
2011–2012	Germany U19	6	(0)
2011–2012	Germany U20	2	(0)
2015–2018	Germany	20	(1)
- * Club domestic league appearances and goals as of 19 September 2025 ‡ National team caps and goals as of 10 June 2018

Kristin Marion Demann (born 7 April 1993) is a German former professional footballer who played as a defender. She started her career with Turbine Potsdam before spending time at TSG Hoffenheim, Bayern Munich, 1. FC Köln, and VfL Wolfsburg. Demann also earned 20 caps with the German national team.

== Club career ==
Demann began playing football at FC Bennigsen, a local club in Springe, at the age of five. In January 2009, she first moved to TSV Havelse, before moving to the youth department of 1. FFC Turbine Potsdam in the summer of the same year. At the same time, she was also a member of the squad for the second team, for which she made her debut on 20 September 2009 (1st matchday) in a 4–1 away win against FSV Gütersloh 2009 in the 2nd Bundesliga. With the B-Junior, she won in 2010 in Potsdam the final of the German B-Junior Championship.

For the 2010/11 season, she moved up to the first team, for which she made her debut on 22 September 2010 in the Champions League round of 16 against Åland United. Four days later she also played in the 1–1 away draw against FCR 2001 Duisburg, replacing Nadine Keßler in the 81st minute in the Bundesliga. With Turbine she won the German championship in 2011 and 2012.

In April 2012, she suffered a cruciate ligament rupture and was rarely used in the following season. For the 2013/14 season, she went on loan for a year to Bundesliga promoted TSG 1899 Hoffenheim. With the Kraichgauers, she became a regular player right away and played all of the season's games over 90 minutes. On 5 June 2014, Hoffenheim finally announced Demann's permanent commitment. She signed a two-year contract there.

Demann joined FC Bayern Munich in 2017. She made her debut on 2 September 2017 (1st matchday), in a 3–0 away win against SGS Essen from the start. She scored her first Bundesliga goal for Bayern on 1 October 2017 (matchday 4) in a 4–0 away win against TSG 1899 Hoffenheim, scoring 3–0 in the 49th minute.

At the beginning of 2022, she moved to 1. FC Köln on loan. For the 2022/23 season, she was committed by VfL Wolfsburg in May 2022, where she signed a contract valid until 30 June 2025.

In April 2025, she announced her retirement from football after the 2024–25 season.

== International career ==
She played her first international match for the U15 national team on 11 April 2007 in Buckinghamshire, which they won 2–0 against England.

Her first appearance with the U16 juniors followed on 22 April 2009, in Castelfranco di Sotto in a 4–1 win over Scotland's national team. With the U16 national team, she took part in the Nordic Cup tournament in Sweden in June 2009, where she and the team finished second after losing 1–2 to the hosts.

On 4 September 2009, she made her debut for the U17 national team when they drew 0–0 with the Iceland national team. She took part in the European Championship held from 22 to 26 June 2010 in Nyon/Switzerland and finished third in the tournament with the team. She also took part in the U17 World Cup, held in Trinidad and Tobago from 5 to 25 September 2010, reached the quarter- finals with the team (0–1 against North Korea) and scored on the first day of the tournament in a 9–0 victory over Mexico. She was in both tournaments captain of her team.

She made her debut in the U19 national team on 23 February 2011 in Nettetal, in a 2–0 win over the national team of the Netherlands. From 30 May to 11 June 2011, she took part with the team at the European Championship in Italy and advanced to the final, which was won 8–1 against Norway.

This was followed by her debut in the U20 national team, in a 4–0 win on 25 October 2011 in Bitburg against the national team of Belgium.

She was first called up to the senior squad in September 2015 after Babett Peter had to pull out through injury. On 22 October 2015 she was in Wiesbaden – with a substitution for Annike Krahn in the 74th minute – her debut in the senior national team, which won the European Championship qualifier against the national team of Russia 2–0. She scored her first senior international goal on 16 September 2017, in a 6–0 win in the 2019 World Cup qualifier over Slovenia with the goal in the 88th minute.

== Career statistics ==
=== International ===
As of 18 September 2021

Germany
Year	Apps	Goals
2015	2	0
2016	4	0
2017	10	1
2018	4	0
Total	20	1

=== International goal ===
Scores and results list Germany's goal tally first:

Demann – goals for Germany
#	Date	Location	Opponent	Score	Result	Competition
1.	16 September 2017	Ingolstadt, Germany	Slovenia	6–0	6–0	2019 FIFA Women's World Cup qualifying

== Honours ==
=== Club ===
1. FFC Turbine Potsdam

- German Champion: Winner 2011, 2012

Bayern Munich

- German Champion: Winner 2021

VfL Wolfsburg

- German Cup: Winner 2023

=== International ===
- UEFA U19 Championship: Winner 2011
