= Alina Myagkova =

Russian footballer (born 1999)

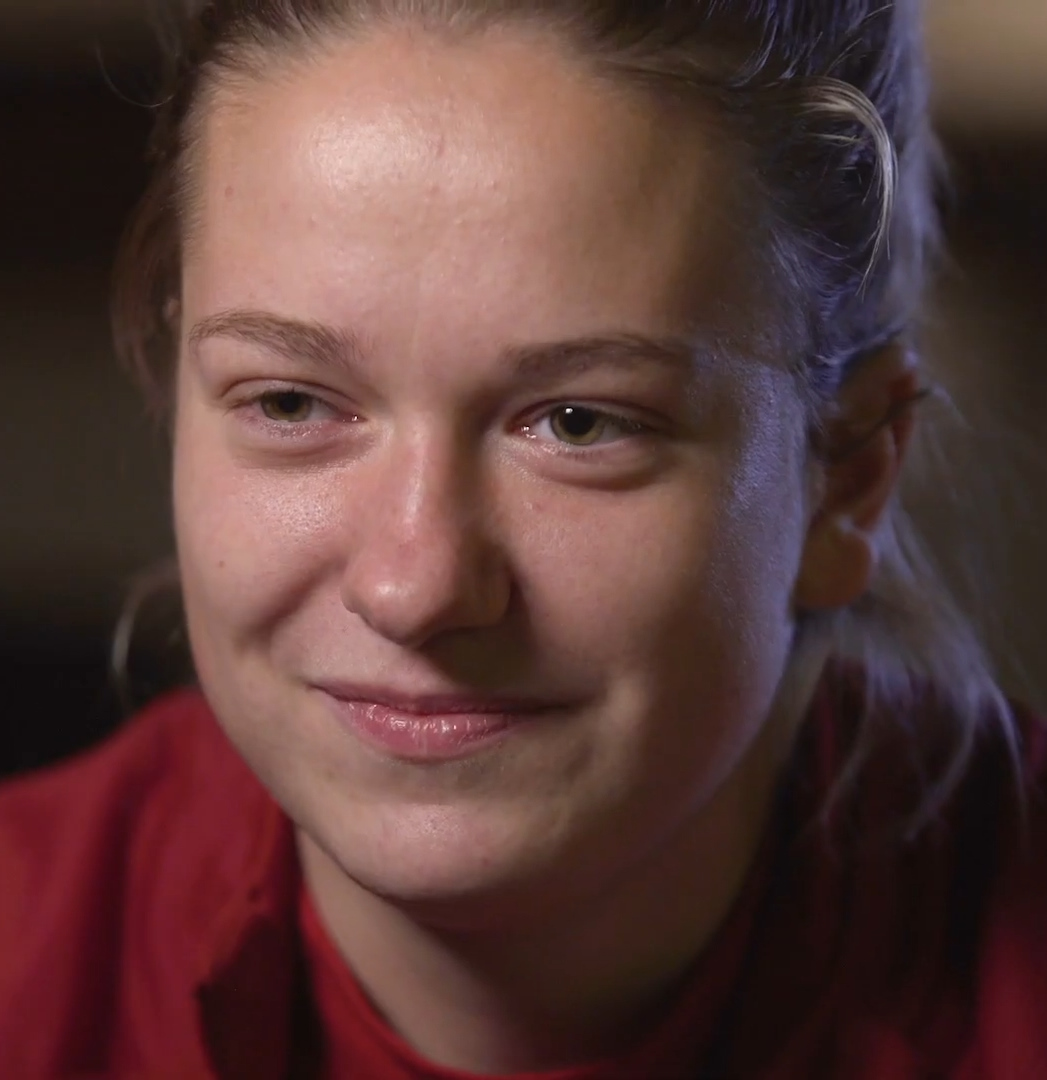
- Myagkova in 2020

Personal information
- Full name: Alina Sergeevna Myagkova
- Date of birth: 15 January 1999 (age 27)
- Place of birth: Lipetsk, Russia
- Height: 1.66 m (5 ft 5 in)
- Position: Midfielder

Team information
- Current team: Lokomotiv Moscow

College career
Years	Team	Apps	(Gls)
2019	Central Michigan Chippewas	13	(3)
2020–2021	Syracuse Orange	21	(0)

Senior career*
Years	Team	Apps	(Gls)
2018–2021	Lokomotiv (Moscow)	42	(0)
2022	Hellas Verona	6	(1)
2022-	Lokomotiv Moscow	5	(0)

International career
2021–	Russia	6	(1)
- * Club domestic league appearances and goals

Alina Sergeevna Myagkova (Russian: Алина Сергеевна Мягкова; born 15 January 1999) is a Russian footballer who plays as a midfielder for Lokomotiv Moscow.

== Career ==
Before the 2018 season, Myagkova signed for Russian side Lokomotiv (Moscow), helping them win the league, their first major trophy. Before the 2020 season, she joined Syracuse Orange in the United States. Before the second half of 2021–22 season, she signed for Italian club Verona.
