= Lara Klopčič =

Slovenian footballer

Personal information
- Date of birth: 3 August 2001 (age 25)
- Position: Defender

International career^{‡}
Years	Team	Apps	(Gls)
2017–2018	Slovenia U17	10	(0)
2018–2019	Slovenia U19	9	(0)
2020–	Slovenia	2	(0)
- ‡ National team caps and goals as of 18 September 2020

Lara Klopčič (born 3 August 2001) is a Slovenian footballer who plays as a defender for the Slovenia women's national team.
