= 2019 FIFA Women's World Cup qualification – UEFA Group 5 =

Football tournament qualification stage

UEFA Group 5 of the 2019 FIFA Women's World Cup qualification competition consisted of five teams: Germany, Iceland, the Czech Republic, Slovenia, and the Faroe Islands (which advanced from the preliminary round). The composition of the seven groups in the qualifying group stage was decided by the draw held on 25 April 2017, with the teams seeded according to their coefficient ranking.

The group was played in home-and-away round-robin format between 14 September 2017 and 4 September 2018. The group winners qualified for the final tournament, while the runners-up advanced to the play-offs if they were one of the four best runners-up among all seven groups (not counting results against the fifth-placed team).

== Standings ==
Pos	Team	Pld	W	D	L	GF	GA	GD	Pts	Qualification	Germany	Iceland	Czech Republic	Slovenia	Faroe Islands
1	Germany	8	7	0	1	38	3	+35	21	2019 FIFA Women's World Cup	—	2–3	4–0	6–0	11–0
2	Iceland	8	5	2	1	22	6	+16	17		0–2	—	1–1	2–0	8–0
3	Czech Republic	8	4	2	2	20	8	+12	14		0–1	1–1	—	2–0	4–1
4	Slovenia	8	2	0	6	9	20	−11	6		0–4	0–2	0–4	—	5–0
5	Faroe Islands	8	0	0	8	1	53	−52	0		0–8	0–5	0–8	0–4	—

Source: UEFA
Rules for classification: Qualification tiebreakers

== Matches ==
Times are CET/CEST, (Note: CEST (UTC+2) for dates between 26 March and 28 October 2017 and between 25 March and 27 October 2018, and CET (UTC+1) for all other dates.) as listed by UEFA (local times, if different, are in parentheses).

14 September 2017
20:00 (19:00 WEST)

Faroe Islands	0–8	Czech Republic
	Report	Svitková 8', 44'; Bartoňová 25'; Kožárová 27', 40', 68'; Divišová 39'; Voňková 70'

Tórsvøllur, Tórshavn
Attendance: 517
Referee: Simona Ghisletta (Switzerland)
16 September 2017
14:00

Germany	6–0	Slovenia
Huth 15'; Marozsán 18' (pen.); Hendrich 35'; Kemme 45+2', 80'; Demann 88'	Report

Audi Sportpark, Ingolstadt
Attendance: 3,112
Referee: Volha Tsiareshka (Belarus)

18 September 2017
20:15 (18:15 WET)

Iceland	8–0	Faroe Islands
Jensen 3', 26'; Jónsdóttir 17', 47'; S. Gunnarsdóttir 39'; Friðriksdóttir 66', 90+1'; Þorvaldsdóttir 90'	Report

Laugardalsvöllur, Reykjavík
Attendance: 2,113
Referee: Sara Persson (Sweden)
19 September 2017
17:58

Czech Republic	0–1	Germany
	Report	Bartoňová 51' (o.g.)

Městský stadion, Ústí nad Labem
Attendance: 588
Referee: Marta Huerta De Aza (Spain)

20 October 2017
16:00

Germany	2–3	Iceland
Popp 42'; Schüller 88'	Report	Brynjarsdóttir 15', 58'; Jensen 47'

BRITA-Arena, Wiesbaden
Attendance: 4,292
Referee: Stéphanie Frappart (France)
20 October 2017
18:00

Slovenia	0–4	Czech Republic
	Report	Divišová 9', 32'; Kožárová 72'; Voňková 76'

Domžale Sports Park, Domžale
Attendance: 300
Referee: Tania Fernandes Morais (Luxembourg)

24 October 2017
16:10

Germany	11–0	Faroe Islands
Popp 12', 45+1'; Kemme 15', 27'; Peter 30'; Hendrich 33'; Magull 48'; Kayikçi 63', 76', 83', 89'	Report

Mechatronik Arena, Aspach
Attendance: 2,207
Referee: Ana Aguiar (Portugal)
24 October 2017
18:00

Czech Republic	1–1	Iceland
Bartoňová 63'	Report	Brynjarsdóttir 44'

Městský stadion, Znojmo
Attendance: 1,113
Referee: Gyöngyi Gaál (Hungary)

24 November 2017
14:00

Slovenia	5–0	Faroe Islands
Prašnikar 7', 36', 87'; Agrež 29'; Rozmarič 41'	Report

Ajdovščina Stadium, Ajdovščina
Attendance: 200
Referee: Irina Lyussina (Belgium)

6 April 2018
17:00

Slovenia	0–2	Iceland
	Report	Jónsdóttir 15'; Hönnudóttir 37'

Lendava Sports Park, Lendava
Attendance: 500
Referee: Amy Fearn (England)
7 April 2018
16:15

Germany	4–0	Czech Republic
Schüller 5', 31', 68', 79'	Report

Erdgas Sportpark, Halle
Attendance: 4,564
Referee: Kateryna Monzul (Ukraine)

10 April 2018
16:00

Slovenia	0–4	Germany
	Report	Magull 10'; Golob 43' (o.g.); Popp 53'; Dallmann 61'

Domžale Sports Park, Domžale
Attendance: 500
Referee: Sarah Garratt (England)
10 April 2018
18:00 (17:00 WEST)

Faroe Islands	0–5	Iceland
	Report	Jónsdóttir 37'; Hönnudóttir 48'; Þorsteinsdóttir 58'; Albertsdóttir 89'; Friðriksdóttir 90+4'

Tórsvøllur, Tórshavn
Attendance: 367
Referee: Anastasia Romanyuk (Ukraine)

7 June 2018
18:00 (17:00 WEST)

Faroe Islands	0–4	Slovenia
	Report	Ivanuša 10'; Zver 21' (pen.), 65'; Prašnikar 88'

Tórsvøllur, Tórshavn
Attendance: 412
Referee: Katarzyna Lisiecka-sek (Poland)

11 June 2018
20:00 (18:00 WET)

Iceland	2–0	Slovenia
Viggósdóttir 54', 68'	Report

Laugardalsvöllur, Reykjavík
Attendance: 2,327
Referee: Shona Shukrula (Netherlands)
12 June 2018
17:30

Czech Republic	4–1	Faroe Islands
Svitková 14'; Martínková 52'; Voňková 63'; Stárová 75'	Report	Simonsen 89'

Letní stadion, Chomutov
Attendance: 926
Referee: Eleni Antoniou (Greece)

31 August 2018
16:00

Czech Republic	2–0	Slovenia
Svitková 12'; Divišová 63'	Report

Stadion Střelnice, Jablonec nad Nisou
Attendance: 632
Referee: Elvira Nurmustafina (Kazakhstan)
1 September 2018
16:55 (14:55 WET)

Iceland	0–2	Germany
	Report	Huth 42', 74'

Laugardalsvöllur, Reykjavík
Attendance: 9,636
Referee: Pernilla Larsson (Sweden)

4 September 2018
17:00 (15:00 WET)

Iceland	1–1	Czech Republic
Viggósdóttir 87'	Report	Szewieczková 12'

Laugardalsvöllur, Reykjavík
Attendance: 2,226
Referee: Ivana Projkovska (Macedonia)
4 September 2018
17:00 (16:00 WEST)

Faroe Islands	0–8	Germany
	Report	Schüller 3'; Magull 25', 68'; Maier 27'; Simon 58', 73'; Popp 71', 90+2'

Tórsvøllur, Tórshavn
Attendance: 653
Referee: Lizzy van der Helm (Netherlands)

== Goalscorers ==
There were 90 goals scored in 20 matches, for an average of 4.5 goals per match.

6 goals

- (Germany) Alexandra Popp
- (Germany) Lea Schüller

4 goals

- (Czech Republic) Petra Divišová
- (Czech Republic) Tereza Kožárová
- (Czech Republic) Kateřina Svitková
- (Germany) Hasret Kayikçi
- (Germany) Tabea Kemme
- (Germany) Lina Magull
- (Iceland) Gunnhildur Yrsa Jónsdóttir
- (Slovenia) Lara Prašnikar

3 goals

- (Czech Republic) Lucie Voňková
- (Germany) Svenja Huth
- (Iceland) Dagný Brynjarsdóttir
- (Iceland) Fanndís Friðriksdóttir
- (Iceland) Elín Metta Jensen
- (Iceland) Glódís Perla Viggósdóttir

2 goals

- (Czech Republic) Eva Bartoňová
- (Germany) Kathrin Hendrich
- (Germany) Carolin Simon
- (Iceland) Rakel Hönnudóttir
- (Slovenia) Mateja Zver

1 goal

- (Czech Republic) Lucie Martínková
- (Czech Republic) Antonie Stárová
- (Czech Republic) Tereza Szewieczková
- (Faroe Islands) Milja Simonsen
- (Germany) Linda Dallmann
- (Germany) Kristin Demann
- (Germany) Leonie Maier
- (Germany) Dzsenifer Marozsán
- (Germany) Babett Peter
- (Iceland) Agla María Albertsdóttir
- (Iceland) Sara Björk Gunnarsdóttir
- (Iceland) Harpa Þorsteinsdóttir
- (Iceland) Berglind Björg Þorvaldsdóttir
- (Slovenia) Sara Agrež
- (Slovenia) Lara Ivanuša
- (Slovenia) Špela Rozmarič

1 own goal

- (Czech Republic) Eva Bartoňová (against Germany)
- (Slovenia) Lana Golob (against Germany)
