= Špela Rozmarič =

Slovenian footballer

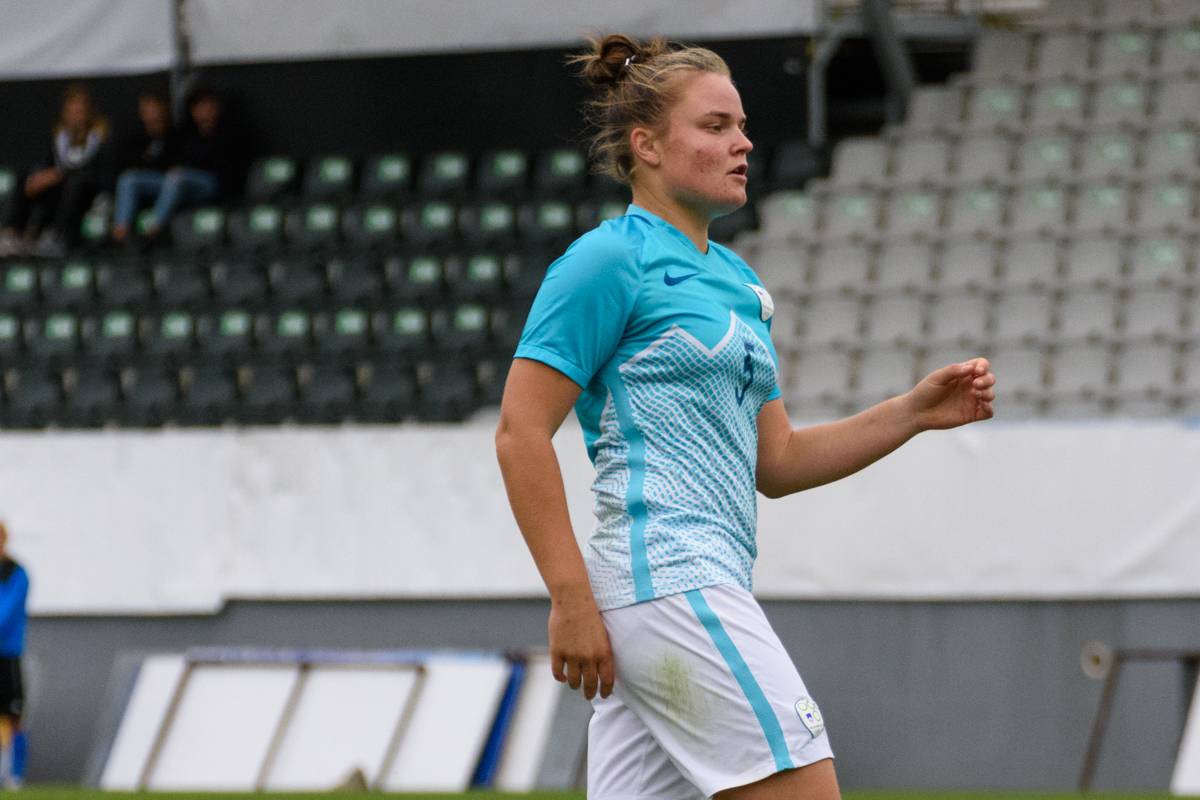
- Špela Rozmarič, 2018

Personal information
- Date of birth: 13 January 1998 (age 28)
- Position: Defender

Team information
- Current team: Pomurje
- Number: 34

International career^{‡}
| Years | Team | Apps | (Gls) |
- Slovenia
- ‡ National team caps and goals as of 19:50, 30 August 2019 (UTC)

Špela Rozmarič (born 13 January 1998) is a Slovenian footballer who plays as a defender and has appeared for the Slovenia women's national team.

== Career ==
Rozmarič has been capped for the Slovenia national team, appearing for the team during the 2019 FIFA Women's World Cup qualifying cycle.
