= Lea Schüller =

German footballer (born 1997)

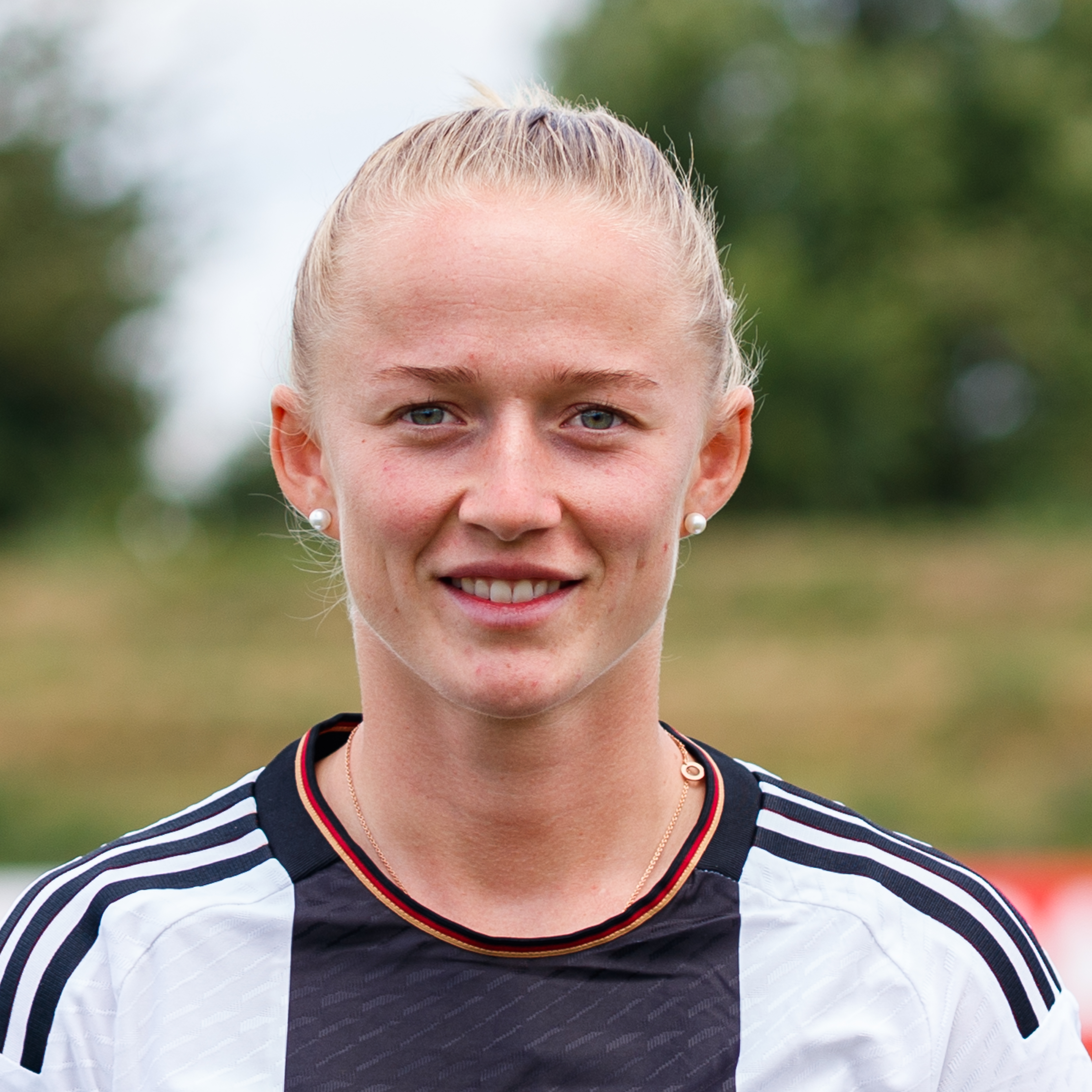
- Schüller with Germany in 2023

Personal information
- Full name: Lea Schüller
- Date of birth: 12 November 1997 (age 29)
- Place of birth: Tönisvorst, Germany
- Height: 1.73 m (5 ft 8 in)
- Position: Forward

Team information
- Current team: Manchester United
- Number: 24

Youth career
- –2012: Hülser SV
- 2012–2014: SGS Essen

Senior career*
Years	Team	Apps	(Gls)
2013–2020	SGS Essen	125	(62)
2020–2025	Bayern Munich	117	(73)
2026–	Manchester United	21	(1)

International career^{‡}
2013–2014	Germany U17	4	(0)
2014–2016	Germany U19	15	(6)
2013–2015	Germany U20	4	(2)
2017–	Germany	87	(56)
Medal record
Women's football
Representing Germany
Olympic Games
Bronze medal – third place	2024 Paris	Team
UEFA Women's Championship
Runner-up	2022 England
UEFA Women's Nations League
Bronze medal – third place	2024 France–Netherlands–Spain
- * Club domestic league appearances and goals as of 19:55, 14 November 2026 (UTC) ‡ National team caps and goals as of 22:45, 5 June 2026 (UTC)

Lea Schüller (born 12 November 1997) is a German professional footballer who plays as a forward for Women's Super League club Manchester United and the Germany national team.

== Club career ==
=== SGS Essen ===
Schüller started playing football at Hülser SV before joining the youth department of SGS Essen in 2012. She made her Frauen-Bundesliga debut aged 16 on 1 December 2013, in a 2–0 home defeat against VfL Wolfsburg. She scored her first two Bundesliga goals on 26 February 2014, in a 3–1 away win against BV Cloppenburg. In July 2017, Schüller extended her contract with SGS Essen for two years until June 2020.

=== Bayern Munich ===
In July 2020, Schüller signed a three-year contract with Bayern Munich. She made her debut for her new team in a preseason match, scoring the first two goals for a 3–1 win against SC Freiburg on 9 August. At the next preseason friendly, against UWCL qualifiers Slavia Prague, Schüller contributed a goal in a 4–0 win.

Schüller also made her first ever UEFA Women's Champions League appearance in a 2–1 loss against defending champions Olympique Lyonnais on 23 August. Bayern was subsequently knocked out on a 2–2 aggregate loss, with Olympique Lyonnais moving to the semi-finals with an away-goal advantage.

FC Bayern began the 2020–21 Frauen-Bundesliga against SC Sand on 4 September, with Schüller in the starting XI and scoring her first Bundesliga goal with the team, ending with a 6–0 victory. Bayern would go on to win their third league title. Schüller scored a total of 16 goals in her first season with Bayern Munich, finishing third place behind Nicole Billa of TSG Hoffenheim (23 goals) and Laura Freigang of Eintracht Frankfurt (17 goals) as top scorers of the season.

She continued her impressive displays in the 2021–22 Frauen-Bundesliga season, finishing as the league's top goalscorer with 16 goals as well as the club's top goalscorer with 21 goals in all competitions. In the 2022–23 season, Schüller scored 19 times across all competitions to help Bayern win the league title once more.

In the 2023–24 season, she scored the game winner in the 77th minute of the 2–1 away victory over Eintracht Frankfurt. Lea reached double figures for league goals yet again, scoring 11 times as Bayern retained the Frauen-Bundesliga. On 1 May 2025, Schüller scored a hat-trick to fire Bayern to a 4-2 win over Werder Bremen in the DFB-Pokal Frauen final. This secured the club's first-ever domestic double and first DFB-Pokal trophy since 2012.

During her five-and-a-half years at Bayern Munich, Schüller scored 103 goals in 181 appearances across all competitions, firmly establishing her as one of Europe's most prolific centre-forwards.

=== Manchester United ===
On 29 December 2025, Schüller agreed to join Women's Super League side Manchester United on a contract until June 2029, starting on 1 January 2026. She made her debut for the club on 10 January, coming on as a 60th minute substitute in a 0–0 WSL draw against Arsenal, before scoring her first goal the following week in a 5–0 FA Cup win against Burnley.

== International career ==
Schüller appeared for Germany under-17 national team at the 2014 U-17 Women's World Cup in Costa Rica, playing in all three group matches. With the under-19 team, she participated in the UEFA Women's Under-19 Championship in Israel, again playing in all three group matches and the defeat on penalties to Sweden in the semi-finals. She was then a member of the German under-20 squad at the U-20 Women's World Cup in Papua New Guinea in 2016, where they lost to France in the quarter-finals.

Schüller was first called up by coach Steffi Jones to train with the full Germany national squad in June 2017, but did not make the final squad for the 2017 UEFA Women's Championship. She made her full international debut against Iceland in a 2019 World Cup qualifying match on 20 October 2017, coming on as a late substitute and scoring the final goal in a 3–2 defeat for Germany. Later in qualifying in April 2018, Schüller scored all 4 goals against the Czech Republic in a 4–0 win.

Schüller was called up to the Germany squad for the 2019 FIFA Women's World Cup. Following strong performances, Lea was named her country's women's national Player of the Year for 2021.

On 18 June 2022, Schüller was called up to the 23-player Germany squad for the UEFA Women's Euro 2022, where they reached the final. She scored in their opening game of the tournament, a 4-0 win against Denmark. Schüller started the final at Wembley Stadium, where Germany lost 2-1 after extra time to hosts England. Schüller won Germany's 2022 Footballer of the Year award.

Schüller was called up to the Germany squad for the 2023 FIFA Women's World Cup.

On 3 July 2024, Schüller was called up to the Germany squad for the 2024 Summer Olympics. She helped her nation win the bronze medal at the Games, with Germany beating world champions Spain 1-0 in the Bronze medal match.

On 12 June 2025, Schüller was called up to the Germany squad for the UEFA Women's Euro 2025. She helped them to reach the semi-finals by scoring goals against Denmark and Poland before being knocked out by Spain.

As of December 2025, Schüller is Germany's sixth all-time leading scorer with a tally of over 50 goals.

== Personal life ==
From 2019, Schüller was in a relationship with Austrian sport sailor Lara Vadlau, but broke up in 2024. Since 2025, Schüller is in a relationship with Martina Piemonte.

== Career statistics ==
=== Club ===
As of match played 18 November 2026

Appearances and goals by club, season and competition
Club	Season	League			National cup (Note: Includes DFB Pokal, Women's FA Cup)		Continental		Other		Total	
Club	Season	Division	Apps	Goals	Apps	Goals	Apps	Goals	Apps	Goals	Apps	Goals
SGS Essen	2013–14	Frauen-Bundesliga	7	2	3	0	—		—		10	2
SGS Essen	2014–15	Frauen-Bundesliga	18	7	1	0	—		—		19	7
SGS Essen	2015–16	Frauen-Bundesliga	22	8	2	1	—		—		24	9
SGS Essen	2016–17	Frauen-Bundesliga	13	8	1	0	—		—		14	8
SGS Essen	2017–18	Frauen-Bundesliga	21	7	4	4	—		—		25	11
SGS Essen	2018–19	Frauen-Bundesliga	22	14	2	4	—		—		24	18
SGS Essen	2019–20	Frauen-Bundesliga	22	16	5	6	—		—		27	22
SGS Essen	Total		125	62	18	15	—		—		143	77
Bayern Munich	2019–20	Frauen-Bundesliga	—		—		1 (Note: Appearances in UEFA Women's Champions League)	0	—		1	0
Bayern Munich	2020–21	Frauen-Bundesliga	20	16	4	7	7	3	—		31	26
Bayern Munich	2021–22	Frauen-Bundesliga	22	16	2	1	7	4	—		31	21
Bayern Munich	2022–23	Frauen-Bundesliga	22	14	4	1	10	4	—		36	19
Bayern Munich	2023–24	Frauen-Bundesliga	21	11	4	0	5	3	—		30	14
Bayern Munich	2024–25	Frauen-Bundesliga	22	11	5	5	7	0	1 (Note: Appearance in DFB-Supercup)	0	35	16
Bayern Munich	2025–26	Frauen-Bundesliga	10	5	1	0	4	1	1	1	16	7
Bayern Munich	Total		117	73	20	14	41	15	2	1	180	103
Manchester United	2025–26	Women's Super League	11	1	2	1	3	0	2 (Note: Appearances in WSL Players Cup)	0	18	2
Manchester United	2026–27	Women's Super League	10	0	0	0	—		5	5	15	5
Manchester United	Total		21	1	2	1	3	0	7	5	33	7
Career total			263	136	40	30	44	15	9	6	356	187

=== International ===
As of 5 June 2026

Appearances and goals by national team and year
National team	Year	Apps	Goals
Germany	2017	3	1
Germany	2018	8	6
Germany	2019	8	3
Germany	2020	4	2
Germany	2021	11	11
Germany	2022	10	7
Germany	2023	10	5
Germany	2024	15	12
Germany	2025	13	7
Germany	2026	5	2
Total		87	56

Scores and results list Germany's goal tally first, score column indicates score after each Schüller goal.

List of international goals scored by Lea Schüller
No.	Date	Venue	Opponent	Score	Result	Competition
1	20 October 2017	Wiesbaden, Germany	Iceland	2–3	2–3	2019 FIFA Women's World Cup qualification
2	7 April 2018	Zwickau, Germany	Czech Republic	1–0	4–0	2019 FIFA Women's World Cup qualification
3	7 April 2018	Zwickau, Germany	Czech Republic	2–0	4–0	2019 FIFA Women's World Cup qualification
4	7 April 2018	Zwickau, Germany	Czech Republic	3–0	4–0	2019 FIFA Women's World Cup qualification
5	7 April 2018	Zwickau, Germany	Czech Republic	4–0	4–0	2019 FIFA Women's World Cup qualification
6	4 September 2018	Tórshavn, Faroe Islands	Faroe Islands	1–0	8–0	2019 FIFA Women's World Cup qualification
7	6 October 2018	Essen, Germany	Austria	3–1	3–1	Friendly
8	28 February 2019	Laval, France	France	1–0	1–0	Friendly
9	22 June 2019	Grenoble, France	Nigeria	3–0	3–0	2019 FIFA Women's World Cup
10	31 August 2019	Kassel, Germany	Montenegro	9–0	10–0	UEFA Women's Euro 2021 qualifying
11	7 March 2020	Lagos, Portugal	Norway	1–0	4–0	2020 Algarve Cup
12	19 September 2020	Essen, Germany	Republic of Ireland	3–0	3–0	UEFA Women's Euro 2021 qualifying
13	21 February 2021	Aachen, Germany	Belgium	2–0	2–0	Friendly
14	18 September 2021	Cottbus, Germany	Bulgaria	1–0	7–0	2023 FIFA Women's World Cup qualification
15	18 September 2021	Cottbus, Germany	Bulgaria	5–0	7–0	2023 FIFA Women's World Cup qualification
16	21 September 2021	Chemnitz, Germany	Serbia	1–1	5–1	2023 FIFA Women's World Cup qualification
17	21 September 2021	Chemnitz, Germany	Serbia	2–1	5–1	2023 FIFA Women's World Cup qualification
18	21 September 2021	Chemnitz, Germany	Serbia	3–1	5–1	2023 FIFA Women's World Cup qualification
19	21 September 2021	Chemnitz, Germany	Serbia	4–1	5–1	2023 FIFA Women's World Cup qualification
20	26 November 2021	Braunschweig, Germany	Turkey	2–0	8–0	2023 FIFA Women's World Cup qualification
21	26 November 2021	Braunschweig, Germany	Turkey	3–0	8–0	2023 FIFA Women's World Cup qualification
22	26 November 2021	Braunschweig, Germany	Turkey	5–0	8–0	2023 FIFA Women's World Cup qualification
23	30 November 2021	Faro, Portugal	Portugal	1–0	3–1	2023 FIFA Women's World Cup qualification
24	17 February 2022	Middlesbrough, England	Spain	1–1	1–1	2022 Arnold Clark Cup
25	12 April 2022	Stara Pazova, Serbia	Serbia	1–2	2–3	2023 FIFA Women's World Cup qualification
26	8 July 2022	London, England	Denmark	2–0	4–0	UEFA Women's Euro 2022
27	3 September 2022	Bursa, Turkey	Turkey	3–0	3–0	2023 FIFA Women's World Cup qualification
28	6 September 2022	Plovdiv, Bulgaria	Bulgaria	1–0	8–0	2023 FIFA Women's World Cup qualification
29	6 September 2022	Plovdiv, Bulgaria	Bulgaria	3–0	8–0	2023 FIFA Women's World Cup qualification
30	6 September 2022	Plovdiv, Bulgaria	Bulgaria	4–0	8–0	2023 FIFA Women's World Cup qualification
31	7 July 2023	Fürth, Germany	Zambia	1–2	2–3	Friendly
32	24 July 2023	Melbourne, Australia	Morocco	6–0	6–0	2023 FIFA Women's World Cup
33	26 September 2023	Bochum, Germany	Iceland	3–0	4–0	2023–24 UEFA Women's Nations League
34	27 October 2023	Sinsheim, Germany	Wales	1–0	5–1	2023–24 UEFA Women's Nations League
35	27 October 2023	Sinsheim, Germany	Wales	2–1	5–1	2023–24 UEFA Women's Nations League
36	28 February 2024	Heerenveen, Netherlands	Netherlands	2–0	2–0	2023–24 UEFA Women's Nations League
37	9 April 2024	Aachen, Germany	Iceland	1–0	3–1	UEFA Women's Euro 2025 qualifying
38	9 April 2024	Aachen, Germany	Iceland	2–1	3–1	UEFA Women's Euro 2025 qualifying
39	31 May 2024	Rostock, Germany	Poland	2–1	4–1	UEFA Women's Euro 2025 qualifying
40	4 June 2024	Gdynia, Poland	Poland	1–1	3–1	UEFA Women's Euro 2025 qualifying
41	4 June 2024	Gdynia, Poland	Poland	2–1	3–1	UEFA Women's Euro 2025 qualifying
42	16 July 2024	Hanover, Germany	Austria	3–0	4–0	UEFA Women's Euro 2025 qualifying
43	25 July 2024	Marseille, France	Australia	2–0	3–0	2024 Summer Olympics
44	31 July 2024	Saint-Étienne, France	Zambia	1–0	4–1	2024 Summer Olympics
45	31 July 2024	Saint-Étienne, France	Zambia	3–1	4–1	2024 Summer Olympics
46	29 November 2024	Zurich, Switzerland	Switzerland	3–0	6–0	Friendly
47	29 November 2024	Zurich, Switzerland	Switzerland	6–0	6–0	Friendly
48	21 February 2025	Breda, Netherlands	Netherlands	1–1	2–2	2025 UEFA Women's Nations League
49	4 April 2025	Dundee, Scotland	Scotland	4–0	4–0	2025 UEFA Women's Nations League
50	30 May 2025	Bremen, Germany	Netherlands	2–0	4–0	2025 UEFA Women's Nations League
51	30 May 2025	Bremen, Germany	Netherlands	4–0	4–0	2025 UEFA Women's Nations League
52	3 June 2025	Vienna, Austria	Austria	2–0	6–0	2025 UEFA Women's Nations League
53	4 July 2025	St. Gallen, Switzerland	Poland	2–0	2–0	UEFA Women's Euro 2025
54	8 July 2025	Basel, Switzerland	Denmark	2–1	2–1	UEFA Women's Euro 2025
55	3 March 2026	Dresden, Germany	Slovenia	5–0	5–0	2027 FIFA World Cup qualification
56	14 April 2026	Nuremberg, Germany	Austria	5–1	5–1	2027 FIFA World Cup qualification

== Honours ==
Bayern Munich

- Bundesliga: 2020–21, 2022–23, 2023–24, 2024–25
- DFB-Pokal: 2024–25
- DFB-Supercup Frauen: 2024, 2025

Manchester United

- Women's League Cup runner-up: 2025–26

Germany

- Summer Olympics bronze medal: 2024
- UEFA Women's Championship runner-up: 2022
- UEFA Women's Nations League third place: 2023–24

Individual

- Footballer of the Year (Germany): 2022
- Silbernes Lorbeerblatt: 2024
- Germany women's national Player of the Year: 2021
- Artilheira da DFB-Pokal Frauen: 2024–25
