= Aleksandra Markovska =

Macedonian footballer

Personal information
- Date of birth: 4 May 1997 (age 29)
- Height: 1.65 m (5 ft 5 in)
- Position: Midfielder

Team information
- Current team: Haymana
- Number: 8

Senior career*
Years	Team	Apps	(Gls)
2011–2012	Naše Taksi		
2012–2013	Biljanini Izvori		
2013–2014	Tiberias Brera		
2014–2015	Kočani		
2015	Spartak Subotica		
2015–2022	Skopje 2014		
2022–2026	Ljuboten		
2026–	Haymana	6	(0)

International career^{‡}
2012–2013	Macedonia U-17	6	(0)
2014–2015	Macedonia U-19	6	(0)
2013–	North Macedonia	10	(0)
- * Club domestic league appearances and goals as of 24 October 2026 ‡ National team caps and goals as of 10:09, 19 September 2021 (UTC)

Aleksandra Markovska (born Macedonian: Александра Марковска; 4 May 1997) is a Macedonian footballer who plays as a midfielder in the Turkish Women's Football Super League for Haymana. She is part of the North Macedonia national team.

== Club career ==
Markovska started her football career at the age of fourteen in 2011 joining Naše Taksi. She then played for Biljanini Izvori, Tiberias Brera and Kočani. She had her first international experience with Spartak Subotica in Serbia. Returned to her home country, she spent a period with Skopje 2014. In January 2022, the Tetovo-based club Ljuboten recruited Markovska from Skopje 2014 to strengthen their squad for the second half of the league season. She was instrumental in her team's earning champions title. She took part at the 2025–26 UEFA Women's Champions League qualifying rounds for Ljuboten, and scıred a goal. She last played in the 2025-26 Women's Championship season. In August 2026, she moved to Turkey, and signed a one-year contract with Haymana from Ankara, which was newly promoted to the topflight Women's Super League for the 2026–27 season.

== International career ==
Markovska made her debut for the Macedonia women's national football team on 26 October 2013, coming on as a substitute for Martina Dimoska against the Czech Republic. She played at the UEFA Women's Euro 2022 qualifying Group G matches in 2019 and 2020. She was called up to the national team again in 2024, 2025, and 2026. She is one of the captains the national team. She played in the 2025 UEFA Women's Nations League - Group C6 matches. She was part of the national team at the 2027 FIFA Women's World Cup qualification – UEFA League C.

== Honours ==
Macedonian Championship

Naše Taksi
Winners (1): 2011–2

Biljanini Izvori
Winners (1): 2012–13

Skopje 2014
Winners (3): 2015–16, 2017–18, 2018–19

Ljuboten
Winners (3): 2022–23, 2023–24, 2024–25

Macedonian Cup

Naše Taksi
Winners (1): 2012

Skopje 2014
Winners (1): 2016
Runners-up (2): 2015, 2018

Serbian Super League

Spartak Subotica
Winners (1): 2014–15

Serbian Cup

Spartak Subotica
Winners (1): 2014–15
