= Macedonian Footballer of the Year =

Macedonian Footballer of the Year an annual title awarded to the best football player of the year in North Macedonia.

== Men's ==
Best player (domestic)

- 2004: Aleksandar Vasoski
- 2006: Artim Položani
- 2011: Ferhan Hasani
- 2013: Dejan Blaževski
- 2014: Borce Manevski
- 2015: Filip Gačevski
- 2016: Besart Ibraimi
- 2017: Stefan Spirovski
- 2018: Besart Ibraimi
- 2019: Visar Musliu

Best player (in foreign league)

- 2004: Goran Pandev
- 2006: Goran Pandev
- 2007: Goran Pandev
- 2008: Goran Pandev
- 2010: Goran Pandev
- 2011: Ivan Tričkovski
- 2012: Agim Ibraimi
- 2013: Nikolče Noveski
- 2014: Agim Ibraimi
- 2015: Aleksandar Trajkovski
- 2016: Ilija Nestorovski
- 2017: Enis Bardhi
- 2018: Enis Bardhi
- 2019: Eljif Elmas

Best foreign player

- 2004: (Brazil) Gilson Da Silva
- 2006: (Serbia) Ivan Pejčić
- 2011: (Bosnia and Herzegovina) Milan Đurić

Best goalscorer

- 2010: Mile Krstev
- 2011: Blaže Ilioski
- 2013: Jovan Kostovski

Coach of the year

- 2004: Gjore Jovanovski
- 2010: Vlatko Kostov
- 2011: Qatip Osmani
- 2013: Blagoja Milevski

Young player of the year

- 2004: Goran Tričkovski
- 2010: Stefan Ristovski
- 2011: Darko Velkovski
- 2013: Marjan Radeski

Best club in youth category

- 2010: FK Rabotnički
- 2011: KF Renova
- 2013: FK Metalurg Skopje

Team of the year

- 2006: FK Rabotnički
- 2010: KF Renova
- 2011: KF Shkëndija

Fair Play award

- 2004: FK Sileks
- 2010: FK Rabotnički
- 2011: FK Sileks
- 2013: FK Rabotnički

== Women ==
Best player

- 2004: Sirieta Brahimi
- 2006: Milka Arsova
- 2010: Nataša Andonova
- 2011: Gentjana Rochi
- 2013: Nataša Andonova

Best goalscorer

- 2013: Eli Jakovska (as Elena)

Coach of the year

- 2013: Astrit Merko

Team of the year

- 2006: ŽFK Skiponjat
- 2006: ŽFK Fighter
- 2011: ŽFK Naše Taksi

== Futsal ==
Best player

- 2006: Zoran Leveski
- 2010: Zoran Leveski
- 2011: Zoran Leveski
- 2013: Dragan Petrović

Coach of the year

- 2013: Zoran Lekić
- 2014: Zoran Leveski

Team of the Year

- 2006: KMF Alfa Parf Skopje
- 2010: KMF Zelezarec Skopje
- 2011: KMF Zelezarec Skopje

== Other ==
Best referee

- 2010: Aleksandar Stavrev
- 2011: Aleksandar Stavrev
- 2013: Dimitar Mečkarovski

Special recognition for referee

- 2011: Ljubomir Krstevski

Best football worker

- 2011: Blagoj Istatov
- 2013: Dragan Popovski, president of FK Rabotnički

Special recognition for football contribution

- 2011: Miodrag Micković for 50 years of sports journalism
- 2010: Dobrislav Dimovski
- 2013: Andon Dončevski (First coach of the North Macedonia national football team)
