= Katerina Mileska =

Macedonian footballer

Personal information
- Date of birth: 24 February 1989 (age 37)
- Position: Defender

Team information
- Current team: Kočani

Senior career*
Years	Team	Apps	(Gls)
–20??	Shkiponjat		
20??–201?	Naše Taksi		
201?–2014	Biljanini Izvori		
2014–	Kočani		

International career^{‡}
	North Macedonia U19	8	(0)
2009–	North Macedonia	41	(0)
- * Club domestic league appearances and goals ‡ National team caps and goals as of 6 March 2020

Katerina Mileska (born 24 February 1989) is a Macedonian footballer who plays as a defender for 1. liga club ŽFK Kočani and the North Macedonia women's national team.
