= Viktorija Doneva =

Macedonian footballer (born 1991)

Personal information
- Date of birth: 24 October 1991 (age 35)
- Position: Goalkeeper

Team information
- Current team: NSA
- Number: 1

Senior career*
Years	Team	Apps	(Gls)
- Naše Taksi
- Biljanini Izvori
- Dragon
- Pomurje
- NSA

International career^{‡}
2015	North Macedonia	4	(0)
- * Club domestic league appearances and goals ‡ National team caps and goals as of 29 November 2015

Viktorija Doneva (Macedonian: Викторија Донева; born 24 October 1991) is a Macedonian footballer who plays as a goalkeeper for Bulgarian Women's Championship club FC NSA Sofia. She has been a member of the North Macedonia women's national team.
