= Pavlina Nikolovska =

Professional Macedonian football player

Pavlinka Nikolovska
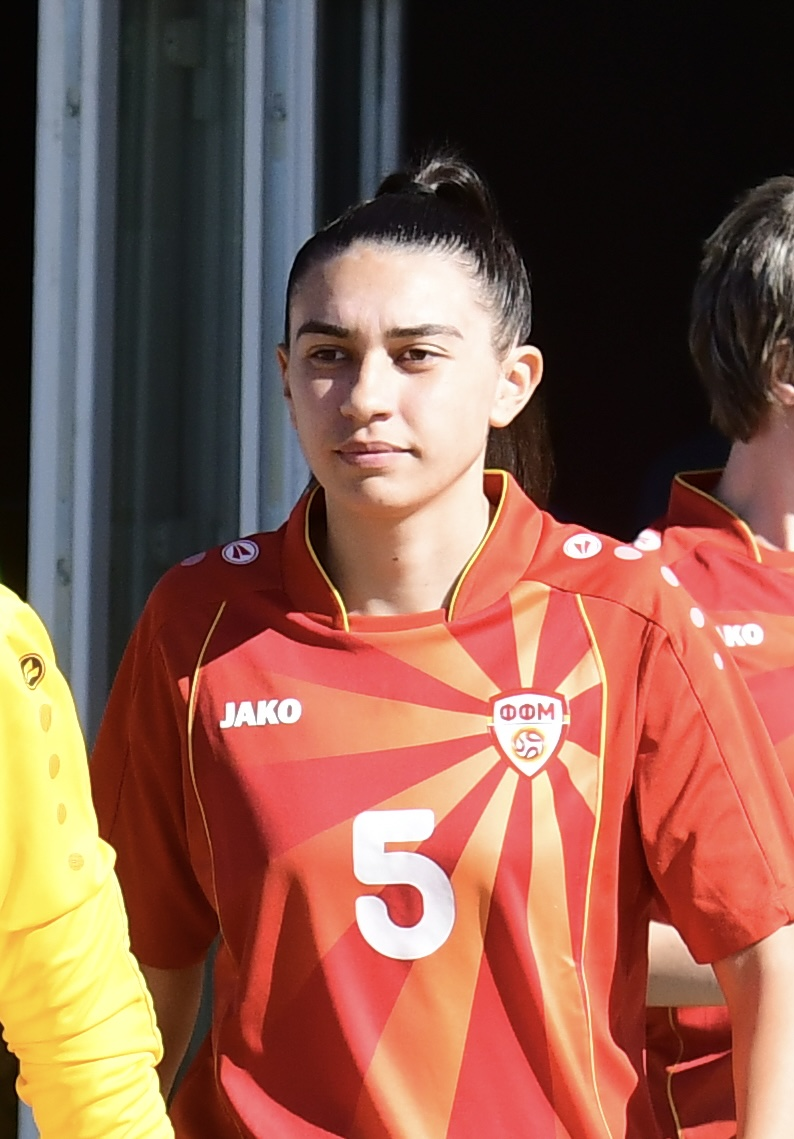
- Nikolovska with North Macedonia in 2023

Personal information
- Full name: Pavlinka Nikolovska
- Date of birth: 4 March 1998 (age 28)
- Place of birth: Strumica, Macedonia
- Height: 1.73 m (5 ft 8 in)
- Position: Defender

Team information
- Current team: ZFK Tiverija Brera

Senior career*
| Years | Team | Apps | (Gls) |
| 2011–2018 | Tiverija | 101 | (88) |
| 2018–2019 | Crvena zvezda | 27 | (6) |
| 2019–2020 | Dragon 2014 | 16 | (4) |
| 2020–2022 | Kamenica Sasa | 68 | (15) |
| | ZFK Ljuboten | 58 | (21) |

International career^{‡}
| 2013–2014 | Macedonia U17 | 12 | (0) |
| 2014–2016 | Macedonia U19 | 12 | (0) |
| 2016– | North Macedonia | 42 | (4) |
- * Club domestic league appearances and goals ‡ National team caps and goals as of 6 March 2020

Pavlinka Nikolovska (born 4 March 1998) is a professional Macedonian footballer who plays as a defender for Macedonian Championship club ZFK Tiverija Brera. She has won 4 league titles and 4 cup titles during her career. Nikolovska has participated four times in the Champions League and has played eight matches with two assists. Additionally, she also represents the North Macedonia national team.

== History ==
Pavlinka Nikolovska started playing football at the age of 13 in her hometown of Strumica. She played 7 years for that club and celebrated 100 games before making an international transfer to the famous and well-known Balkan team "ZFK Crvena Zvezda". She played for one season there and reached the cup final, finishing second in the league table. She then returned to Macedonia to play for "ZFK Dragon 2014" in Skopje for half a season. From Skopje, she moved to Macedonska Kamenica to play for "ZFK Kamenica Sasa" where she signed a 2.5-year contract and won two championship titles and one cup title, appearing twice in the Champions League with that club. She then transferred to the champion team "ZFK Ljuboten", where she played in the Champions League and is still with the club, currently in first place in the Macedonian first league. Pavlinka Nikolovska has been playing for the national team since 2014, starting with the U-17 team and then the U-19 team. Since 2016, she has been an active member and starting player on the Macedonian A team, and a leader in defense.
