= 2020–21 in French football =

Football in France
- Season: 2020–21

Men's football
- Ligue 1: Lille
- Ligue 2: Troyes
- Championnat National: Bastia
- Coupe de France: Paris Saint-Germain
- Trophée des Champions: Paris Saint-Germain

Women's football
- Division 1: Paris Saint-Germain
- Coupe de France: Not awarded

The following article is a summary of the 2020–21 football season in France, which was the 87th season of competitive football in the country and ran from July 2020 to June 2021.

== National teams ==
=== France national football team ===
==== Friendlies ====
7 October 2020	France	7–1	Ukraine	Saint-Denis, France
21:10 CEST (UTC+2)	Camavinga 9'; Giroud 24', 34'; Mykolenko 39' (o.g.); Tolisso 65'; Mbappé 82'; Griezmann 89'	Report	Tsyhankov 53'	Stadium: Stade de France; Attendance: 0 Referee: Andris Treimanis (Latvia)

11 November 2020	France	0–2	Finland	Saint-Denis, France
21:10 CET (UTC+1)		Report	Forss 28'; Valakari 31'	Stadium: Stade de France; Attendance: 0 Referee: Nikola Popov (Bulgaria)

2 June 2021	France	3–0	Wales	Nice, France
21:00 CEST (UTC+2)	Mbappé 35'; Griezmann 48'; Dembélé 79'	Report		Stadium: Allianz Riviera; Referee: Luís Godinho (Portugal)

8 June 2021	France	3–0	Bulgaria	Saint-Denis, France
21:00 CEST (UTC+2)	Griezmann 29'; Giroud 83', 90'	Report		Stadium: Stade de France; Referee: Anastasios Sidiropoulos (Greece)

==== UEFA Nations League A ====
===== Group 3 =====
Pos	Team	Pld	W	D	L	GF	GA	GD	Pts	Qualification or relegation	(France)	(Portugal)	(Croatia)	(Sweden)
1	France	6	5	1	0	12	5	+7	16	Qualification for Nations League Finals	—	0–0	4–2	4–2
2	Portugal	6	4	1	1	12	4	+8	13		0–1	—	4–1	3–0
3	Croatia	6	1	0	5	9	16	−7	3 (Note: Tied on head-to-head results. Overall goal difference was used as the tiebreaker.)		1–2	2–3	—	2–1
4	Sweden (R)	6	1	0	5	5	13	−8	3	Relegation to League B	0–1	0–2	2–1	—

Source: UEFA
Rules for classification: Tiebreakers
(R) Relegated
Notes:

5 September 2020	Sweden	0–1	France	Solna, Sweden
20:45 CEST (UTC+2)		Report	Mbappé 41'	Stadium: Friends Arena; Attendance: 0 (Note: Due to the COVID-19 pandemic in Europe, all matches scheduled for September 2020 will be played behind closed doors.); Referee: Szymon Marciniak (Poland)

8 September 2020	France	4–2	Croatia	Saint-Denis, France
20:45 CEST (UTC+2)	Griezmann 43'; Livaković 45+1' (o.g.); Upamecano 65'; Giroud 77' (pen.)	Report	Lovren 17'; Brekalo 55'	Stadium: Stade de France; Attendance: 0 Referee: Ovidiu Hațegan (Romania)

11 October 2020	France	0–0	Portugal	Saint-Denis, France
20:45 CEST (UTC+2)		Report		Stadium: Stade de France; Referee: Carlos del Cerro Grande (Spain)

14 October 2020	Croatia	1–2	France	Zagreb, Croatia
20:45 CEST (UTC+2)	Vlašić 65'	Report	Griezmann 8'; Mbappé 79'	Stadium: Stadion Maksimir; Referee: Björn Kuipers (Netherlands)

14 November 2020	Portugal	0–1	France	Lisbon, Portugal
20:45 CET (UTC+1)		Report	Kanté 54'	Stadium: Estádio da Luz; Referee: Tobias Stieler (Germany)

17 November 2020	France	4–2	Sweden	Saint-Denis
20:45 CET (UTC+1)	Giroud 16', 59'; Pavard 36'; Coman 90+5'	Report	Claesson 5'; Quaison 88'	Stadium: Stade de France; Referee: Aleksei Kulbakov (Belarus)

===== 2022 FIFA World Cup qualification =====
====== Group D ======
Pos	Team	Pld	W	D	L	GF	GA	GD	Pts	Qualification	France	Ukraine	Finland	Bosnia and Herzegovina	Kazakhstan
1	France	8	5	3	0	18	3	+15	18	Qualification for 2022 FIFA World Cup	—	1–1	2–0	1–1	8–0
2	Ukraine	8	2	6	0	11	8	+3	12	Advance to play-offs	1–1	—	1–1	1–1	1–1
3	Finland	8	3	2	3	10	10	0	11		0–2	1–2	—	2–2	1–0
4	Bosnia and Herzegovina	8	1	4	3	9	12	−3	7		0–1	0–2	1–3	—	2–2
5	Kazakhstan	8	0	3	5	5	20	−15	3		0–2	2–2	0–2	0–2	—

Source: FIFA, UEFA
Rules for classification: Tiebreakers

24 March 2021	France	1–1	Ukraine	Saint-Denis, France
20:45	Griezmann 19'	Report	Sydorchyk 57'	Stadium: Stade de France; Referee: Tobias Stieler (Germany)

28 March 2021	Kazakhstan	0–2	France	Nur-Sultan, Kazakhstan
19:00		Report	Dembélé 19'; Malyi 44' (o.g.)	Stadium: Astana Arena; Referee: Aleksei Kulbakov (Belarus)

31 March 2021	Bosnia and Herzegovina	0–1	France	Sarajevo, Bosnia and Herzegovina
20:45		Report	Griezmann 60'	Stadium: Stadion Grbavica; Referee: Daniele Orsato (Italy)

==== UEFA Euro 2020 ====
===== Group F =====
Pos	Team	Pld	W	D	L	GF	GA	GD	Pts	Qualification
1	France	3	1	2	0	4	3	+1	5	Advance to knockout stage
2	Germany (H)	3	1	1	1	6	5	+1	4 (Note: Head-to-head result: Portugal 2–4 Germany.)	Advance to knockout stage
3	Portugal	3	1	1	1	7	6	+1	4	Advance to knockout stage
4	Hungary (H)	3	0	2	1	3	6	−3	2	

Source: UEFA
(H) Hosts
Notes:

15 June 2021	France	1–0	Germany	Munich, Germany
21:00	Hummels 20' (o.g.)	Report		Stadium: Allianz Arena; Attendance: 13,000; Referee: Carlos del Cerro Grande (Spain)

19 June 2021	Hungary	1–1	France	Budapest, Hungary
15:00	Fiola 45+2'	Report	Griezmann 66'	Stadium: Puskás Aréna; Attendance: 55,998; Referee: Michael Oliver (England)

23 June 2021	Portugal	2–2	France	Budapest, Hungary
21:00	Ronaldo 31' (pen.), 60' (pen.)	Report	Benzema 45+2' (pen.), 47'	Stadium: Puskás Aréna; Attendance: 54,886; Referee: Antonio Mateu Lahoz (Spain)

===== Knockout phase =====
28 June 2021 R16	France	3–3 (a.e.t.) (4–5 p)	Switzerland	Bucharest, Romania
21:00 (22:00 UTC+3)	Benzema 57', 59'; Pogba 75'	Report	Seferovic 15', 81'; Gavranović 90'	Stadium: Arena Națională; Attendance: 22,642; Referee: Fernando Rapallini (Argentina)
	Penalties
	Pogba (penalty scored); Giroud (penalty scored); Thuram (penalty scored); Kimpembe (penalty scored); Mbappé (penalty missed)		(penalty scored) Gavranović; (penalty scored) Schär; (penalty scored) Akanji; (penalty scored) Vargas; (penalty scored) Mehmedi

=== France national under-21 football team ===
==== Summer Olympics ====
Due to the COVID-19 pandemic, the games have been postponed to the summer of 2021. However, their official name remains 2020 Summer Olympics with the rescheduled 2021 dates have yet to be announced.

===== Group A =====
Pos	Team	Pld	W	D	L	GF	GA	GD	Pts	Qualification
1	Japan (H)	3	3	0	0	7	1	+6	9	Advance to knockout stage
2	Mexico	3	2	0	1	8	3	+5	6	Advance to knockout stage
3	France	3	1	0	2	5	11	−6	3	
4	South Africa	3	0	0	3	3	8	−5	0	

Source: TOCOG and FIFA
Rules for classification: Group stage tiebreakers
(H) Hosts

22 July 2021	Mexico	v	France	Tokyo, Japan
				Stadium: Tokyo Stadium

25 July 2021	France	v	South Africa	Saitama, Japan
				Stadium: Saitama Stadium 2002

28 July 2021	France	v	Japan	Yokohama, Japan
				Stadium: International Stadium Yokohama

=== France women's national football team ===
==== Friendly matches ====
20 February 2021	France	2–0	Switzerland	Metz, France
	Renard 12'; Morroni 81'			Stadium: Stade Saint-Symphorien

23 February 2021	France	2–0	Switzerland	Metz, France
	Renard 77', 90+1' (pen.)			Stadium: Stade Saint-Symphorien

9 April 2021	France	3–1	England	Caen, France
21:10 CEST (UTC+2)	Baltimore 32'; Asseyi 63' (pen.); Katoto 82'	Report	Kirby 79' (pen.)	Stadium: Stade Michel d'Ornano; Referee: Sara Persson (Sweden)

13 April 2021	France	0–2	United States	Le Havre, France
		Report	Rapinoe 5' (pen.); Morgan 19'	Stadium: Stade Océane; Referee: Riem Hussein (Germany)

10 June 2021	France	1–0	Germany	Strasbourg, France
21:10 CET (UTC+1)	Dali 30'			Stadium: Stade de la Meinau; Referee: Ivana Martinčić (Croatia)

==== UEFA Women's Euro 2022 qualifying ====
===== Group G =====
Pos	Team	Pld	W	D	L	GF	GA	GD	Pts	Qualification	France	Austria	Serbia	North Macedonia	Kazakhstan
1	France	8	7	1	0	44	0	+44	22	Final tournament	—	3–0	6–0	11–0	12–0
2	Austria	8	6	1	1	22	3	+19	19	Final tournament	0–0	—	1–0	3–0	9–0
3	Serbia	8	4	0	4	21	12	+9	12		0–2	0–1	—	8–1	4–1
4	North Macedonia	8	2	0	6	8	39	−31	6		0–7	0–3	0–6	—	4–1
5	Kazakhstan	8	0	0	8	2	43	−41	0		0–3	0–5	0–3	0–3	—

Source: UEFA
Rules for classification: Tiebreakers

18 September 2020	Serbia	0–2	France	Subotica
21:00		Report	Frajtović 6' (o.g.); Majri 15'	Stadium: Subotica City Stadium; Attendance: 0 Referee: Frida Nielsen (Denmark)

22 September 2020	North Macedonia	0–7	France	Skopje
21:00		Report	Le Sommer 15', 19' (pen.); Katoto 22'; De Almeida 52', 90+3'; Torrent 79'; Asseyi 83' (pen.)	Stadium: Toše Proeski Arena; Attendance: 0 Referee: Reelika Turi (Estonia)

23 October 2020	France	11–0	North Macedonia	Orléans
21:00	Gauvin 1'; Le Sommer 5', 21', 73', 78'; De Almeida 39'; Diani 45+1'; Asseyi 55'; Geyoro 60', 63'; D. Cascarino 76'	Report		Stadium: Stade de la Source; Attendance: 612; Referee: Vera Opeykina (Russia)

27 October 2020	Austria	0–0	France	Wiener Neustadt
21:00		Report		Stadium: Stadion Wiener Neustadt; Attendance: 650; Referee: Pernilla Larsson (Sweden)

27 November 2020	France	3–0	Austria	Guingamp
21:00	Renard 11'; Katoto 27', 73'	Report		Stadium: Stade de Roudourou; Attendance: 0 Referee: Esther Staubli (Switzerland)

1 December 2020	France	12–0	Kazakhstan	Vannes
21:00	De Almeida 5'; Diani 7', 17'; Katoto 12', 16'; Dali 24'; Périsset 33'; D. Cascarino 50'; Laurent 58'; Morroni 67'; Baltimore 72'; Matéo 83'	Report		Stadium: Stade de la Rabine; Attendance: 0 Referee: Lorraine Watson (Scotland)

==== 2023 FIFA Women's World Cup qualification ====
===== Group B =====
Pos	Team	Pld	W	D	L	GF	GA	GD	Pts	Qualification	(France)	(Wales)	(Slovenia)	(Greece)	(Estonia)	(Kazakhstan)
1	France	10	10	0	0	54	4	+50	30	2023 FIFA Women's World Cup	—	2–0	1–0	5–1	11–0	6–0
2	Wales	10	6	2	2	22	5	+17	20	Play-offs	1–2	—	0–0	5–0	4–0	6–0
3	Slovenia	10	5	3	2	21	6	+15	18		2–3	1–1	—	0–0	6–0	2–0
4	Greece	10	4	1	5	12	28	−16	13		0–10	0–1	1–4	—	3–0	3–2
5	Estonia	10	2	0	8	7	43	−36	6		0–9	0–1	0–4	1–3	—	4–2
6	Kazakhstan	10	0	0	10	4	34	−30	0		0–5	0–3	0–2	0–1	0–2	—

Source: UEFA
Rules for classification: Tiebreakers

17 September 2021	Greece	0–10	France	Patras, Greece
		Report	Majri 14'; Geyoro 15', 40'; Katoto 18', 25', 53'; Palama 30' (o.g.); Diani 38'; Asseyi 65'; Renard 90+2' (pen.)	Stadium: Pampeloponnisiako Stadium; Referee: Anastasia Pustovoitova (Russia)

21 September 2021	Slovenia	2–3	France	Murska Sobota, Slovenia
	Prašnikar 20'; Zver 88' (pen.)	Report	Katoto 28', 60'; Majri 90+4' (pen.)	Stadium: Fazanerija City Stadium; Referee: Riem Hussein (Germany)

22 October 2021	France	v	Estonia
		Report

26 October 2021	Kazakhstan	v	France
		Report

26 November 2021	France	v	Kazakhstan
		Report

30 November 2021	France	v	Wales
		Report

8 April 2022	Wales	v	France
		Report

12 April 2022	France	v	Slovenia
		Report

== UEFA competitions ==
=== UEFA Champions League ===
==== Group stage ====
===== Group C =====
Pos	Team	Pld	W	D	L	GF	GA	GD	Pts	Qualification	MCI	POR	OLY	MAR
1	(England) Manchester City	6	5	1	0	13	1	+12	16	Advance to knockout phase	—	3–1	3–0	3–0
2	(Portugal) Porto	6	4	1	1	10	3	+7	13	Advance to knockout phase	0–0	—	2–0	3–0
3	(Greece) Olympiacos	6	1	0	5	2	10	−8	3 (Note: Tied on head-to-head points (3). Head-to-head away goals: Olympiacos 1, Marseille 0.)	Transfer to Europa League	0–1	0–2	—	1–0
4	(France) Marseille	6	1	0	5	2	13	−11	3		0–3	0–2	2–1	—

Source: UEFA

===== Group E =====
Pos	Team	Pld	W	D	L	GF	GA	GD	Pts	Qualification	CHE	SEV	KRA	REN
1	(England) Chelsea	6	4	2	0	14	2	+12	14	Advance to knockout phase	—	0–0	1–1	3–0
2	(Spain) Sevilla	6	4	1	1	9	8	+1	13	Advance to knockout phase	0–4	—	3–2	1–0
3	(Russia) Krasnodar	6	1	2	3	6	11	−5	5	Transfer to Europa League	0–4	1–2	—	1–0
4	(France) Rennes	6	0	1	5	3	11	−8	1		1–2	1–3	1–1	—

Source: UEFA

===== Group H =====
Pos	Team	Pld	W	D	L	GF	GA	GD	Pts	Qualification	PAR	RBL	MUN	IBS
1	(France) Paris Saint-Germain	6	4	0	2	13	6	+7	12 (Note: Tied on head-to-head points (3). Head-to-head away goals: Paris Saint-Germain 1, RB Leipzig 0.)	Advance to knockout phase	—	1–0	1–2	5–1
2	(Germany) RB Leipzig	6	4	0	2	11	12	−1	12	Advance to knockout phase	2–1	—	3–2	2–0
3	(England) Manchester United	6	3	0	3	15	10	+5	9	Transfer to Europa League	1–3	5–0	—	4–1
4	(Turkey) İstanbul Başakşehir	6	1	0	5	7	18	−11	3		0–2	3–4	2–1	—

Source: UEFA

==== Knockout phase ====
===== Round of 16 =====
Team 1	Agg.	Team 2	1st leg	2nd leg
Barcelona (Spain)	2–5	(France) Paris Saint-Germain	1–4	1–1

===== Quarter-finals =====
Team 1	Agg.	Team 2	1st leg	2nd leg
Bayern Munich (Germany)	3–3 (a)	(France) Paris Saint-Germain	2–3	1–0

===== Semi-finals =====
Team 1	Agg.	Team 2	1st leg	2nd leg
Paris Saint-Germain (France)	1–4	(England) Manchester City	1–2	0–2

=== UEFA Europa League ===
==== UEFA Europa League qualifying phase and play-off round ====
===== Second qualifying round =====
Team 1	Score	Team 2
Servette (Switzerland)	0–1	(France) Reims

===== Third qualifying round =====
Team 1	Score	Team 2
Fehérvár (Hungary)	0–0 (a.e.t.) (4–1 p)	(France) Reims

==== Group stage ====
===== Group C =====
Pos	Team	Pld	W	D	L	GF	GA	GD	Pts	Qualification	LEV	SLP	HBS	NCE
1	(Germany) Bayer Leverkusen	6	5	0	1	21	8	+13	15	Advance to knockout phase	—	4–0	4–1	6–2
2	(Czech Republic) Slavia Prague	6	4	0	2	11	10	+1	12	Advance to knockout phase	1–0	—	3–0	3–2
3	(Israel) Hapoel Be'er Sheva	6	2	0	4	7	13	−6	6		2–4	3–1	—	1–0
4	(France) Nice	6	1	0	5	8	16	−8	3		2–3	1–3	1–0	—

Source: UEFA

===== Group H =====
Pos	Team	Pld	W	D	L	GF	GA	GD	Pts	Qualification	MIL	LOSC	SPP	CEL
1	(Italy) Milan	6	4	1	1	12	7	+5	13	Advance to knockout phase	—	0–3	3–0	4–2
2	(France) Lille	6	3	2	1	14	8	+6	11	Advance to knockout phase	1–1	—	2–1	2–2
3	(Czech Republic) Sparta Prague	6	2	0	4	10	12	−2	6		0–1	1–4	—	4–1
4	(Scotland) Celtic	6	1	1	4	10	19	−9	4		1–3	3–2	1–4	—

Source: UEFA

==== Knockout phase ====
===== Round of 32 =====
Team 1	Agg.	Team 2	1st leg	2nd leg
Lille (France)	2–4	(Netherlands) Ajax	1–2	1–2

=== UEFA Youth League ===
On 17 February 2021, the UEFA Executive Committee cancelled the tournament.

==== UEFA Champions League Path ====
Team 1	Score	Team 2
Sevilla (Spain)	3 Mar	(France) Paris Saint-Germain
Zenit Saint Petersburg (Russia)	3 Mar	(France) Rennes
Liverpool (England)	2 Mar	(France) Marseille

==== Domestic Champions Path ====
Team 1	Score	Team 2
Angers (France)	2 Mar	(Serbia) Red Star Belgrade

=== UEFA Women's Champions League ===
==== Knockout phase ====
===== Round of 32 =====
Team 1	Agg.	Team 2	1st leg	2nd leg
Juventus (Italy)	2–6	(France) Lyon	2–3	0–3
Górnik Łęczna (Poland)	2–6	(France) Paris Saint-Germain	0–2	0–3

===== Round of 16 =====
Team 1	Agg.	Team 2	1st leg	2nd leg
Paris Saint-Germain (France)	5–3 (Note: Order of legs between Paris Saint-Germain and Sparta Prague reversed after original draw, due to quarantine of a large number of AC Sparta Prague players prior to the first leg.)	(Czech Republic) Sparta Prague	5–0	0–3 (awd.) (Note: The Sparta Prague v Paris Saint-Germain could not be played due to quarantine of the Paris Saint-Germain players prior to the second leg.)
Lyon (France)	5–1	(Denmark) Brøndby	2–0	3–1

===== Quarter-finals =====
Team 1	Agg.	Team 2	1st leg	2nd leg
Paris Saint-Germain (France)	2–2 (a)	(France) Lyon	0–1	2–1

===== Semi-finals =====
Team 1	Agg.	Team 2	1st leg	2nd leg
Paris Saint-Germain (France)	2–3	(Spain) Barcelona	1–1	1–2

== League tables ==
=== Men ===
==== Ligue 1 ====
Pos	Team	Pld	W	D	L	GF	GA	GD	Pts	Qualification or relegation
1	Lille (C)	38	24	11	3	64	23	+41	83	Qualification for the Champions League group stage
2	Paris Saint-Germain	38	26	4	8	86	28	+58	82	Qualification for the Champions League group stage
3	Monaco	38	24	6	8	76	42	+34	78	Qualification for the Champions League third qualifying round
4	Lyon	38	22	10	6	81	43	+38	76	Qualification for the Europa League group stage (Note: Since the winners of the 2020–21 Coupe de France, Paris Saint-Germain, qualified for European competition based on league position, the Europa League group stage spot reserved for the cup winners was passed to the fifth-placed team, and the Europa Conference League play-off round spot was passed to the sixth-placed team.)
5	Marseille	38	16	12	10	54	47	+7	60	Qualification for the Europa League group stage
6	Rennes	38	16	10	12	52	40	+12	58	Qualification for the Europa Conference League play-off round
7	Lens	38	15	12	11	55	54	+1	57	
8	Montpellier	38	14	12	12	60	62	−2	54	
9	Nice	38	15	7	16	50	53	−3	52	
10	Metz	38	12	11	15	44	48	−4	47	
11	Saint-Étienne	38	12	10	16	42	54	−12	46	
12	Bordeaux	38	13	6	19	42	56	−14	45	
13	Angers	38	12	8	18	40	58	−18	44	
14	Reims	38	9	15	14	42	50	−8	42	
15	Strasbourg	38	11	9	18	49	58	−9	42	
16	Lorient	38	11	9	18	50	68	−18	42	
17	Brest	38	11	8	19	50	66	−16	41	
18	Nantes (O)	38	9	13	16	47	55	−8	40	Qualification for the Relegation play-offs
19	Nîmes (R)	38	9	8	21	40	71	−31	35	Relegation to the Ligue 2
20	Dijon (R)	38	4	9	25	25	73	−48	21	Relegation to the Ligue 2

Source: Ligue 1
Rules for classification: 1) Points; 2) Goal difference; 3) Goals scored; 4) Head-to-head goal difference; 5) Fairplay ranking.
(C) Champions; (O) Play-off winners; (R) Relegated

==== Ligue 2 ====
Pos	Team	Pld	W	D	L	GF	GA	GD	Pts	Promotion or Relegation
1	Troyes (C, P)	38	23	8	7	60	36	+24	77	Promotion to Ligue 1
2	Clermont (P)	38	21	9	8	61	25	+36	72	Promotion to Ligue 1
3	Toulouse	38	20	10	8	71	42	+29	70	Qualification to promotion play-offs
4	Grenoble	38	18	11	9	51	35	+16	65	Qualification to promotion play-offs
5	Paris FC	38	17	13	8	53	37	+16	64	Qualification to promotion play-offs
6	Auxerre	38	16	14	8	64	43	+21	62	
7	Sochaux	38	12	15	11	45	37	+8	51	
8	Nancy	38	11	14	13	53	53	0	47	
9	Guingamp	38	10	17	11	41	43	−2	47	
10	Amiens	38	11	14	13	34	40	−6	47	
11	Valenciennes	38	12	11	15	50	59	−9	47	
12	Le Havre	38	11	14	13	38	48	−10	47	
13	Ajaccio	38	11	13	14	34	43	−9	46	
14	Pau	38	11	11	16	42	49	−7	44	
15	Rodez	38	8	19	11	38	44	−6	43	
16	Dunkerque	38	10	11	17	34	47	−13	41	
17	Caen	38	9	14	15	34	49	−15	41	
18	Niort (O)	38	9	14	15	34	58	−24	41	Qualification for the relegation play-offs
19	Chambly (R)	38	9	11	18	41	64	−23	38	Relegation to Championnat National
20	Châteauroux (R)	38	4	11	23	32	58	−26	23	Relegation to Championnat National

Source: Ligue 2
Rules for classification: 1) Points; 2) Goal difference; 3) Number of goals scored; 4) Head-to-head goal difference; 5) Fair play points
(C) Champions; (O) Play-off winners; (P) Promoted; (R) Relegated

• Promoted In Ligue 1:

- Lorient
- RC Lens

• Promoted In Ligue 2:

- Pau FC
- USL Dunkerque

==== Championnat National ====
Pos	Team	Pld	W	D	L	GF	GA	GD	Pts	Promotion or Relegation
1	SC Bastia (C, P)	34	19	9	6	57	28	+29	66	Promotion to Ligue 2
2	Quevilly-Rouen (P)	34	16	10	8	48	31	+17	58	Promotion to Ligue 2
3	Villefranche (Q)	34	15	10	9	40	29	+11	55	Qualification to promotion play-offs
4	Le Mans	34	13	13	8	46	36	+10	52	
5	Concarneau	34	11	15	8	38	32	+6	48	
6	Orléans	34	12	11	11	49	41	+8	47	
7	Red Star	34	11	14	9	39	33	+6	47	
8	Cholet	34	11	10	13	36	48	−12	43	
9	Bourg-Péronnas	34	10	13	11	29	33	−4	43	
10	Stade Briochin	34	10	13	11	32	33	−1	43	
11	Sète	34	10	13	11	31	32	−1	43	
12	Laval	34	10	12	12	33	32	+1	42	
13	Avranches	34	11	8	15	36	42	−6	41	
14	Annecy	34	9	13	12	42	47	−5	40	
15	Boulogne	34	7	17	10	29	38	−9	38	
16	Bastia-Borgo	34	7	14	13	37	49	−12	35	
17	Créteil	34	8	11	15	29	48	−19	35	
18	SC Lyon (R)	34	5	16	13	33	52	−19	31	Possible relegation to 2021–22 Championnat National 2

Source: Soccerway
Rules for classification: 1) head-to-head results; 2) head-to-head goal difference; 3) goal difference; 4) goals scored; 5) fair play points
(C) Champions; (P) Promoted; (Q) Qualified for the phase indicated; (R) Relegated

Promoted In Clubs: SC Bastia, FC Sète 34, Annecy FC, Stade Briochin

Relegation In Championnat National 2: Le Puy Foot 43 Auvergne, AS Béziers, Gazélec Ajaccio, Sporting Toulon Var

Promoted In Ligue 2: Pau FC, USL Dunkerque

Relegation In Ligue 2: Le Mans FC, Orléans

=== Women ===
==== Division 1 Féminine ====
Pos	Team	Pld	W	D	L	GF	GA	GD	Pts	Qualification or relegation
1	Paris Saint-Germain (C)	22	20	2	0	83	4	+79	62	Qualification for the Champions League group stage
2	Lyon	22	20	1	1	78	6	+72	61	Qualification for the Champions League second round
3	Bordeaux	22	14	2	6	50	23	+27	44	Qualification for the Champions League first round
4	Paris FC	22	11	4	7	39	29	+10	37	
5	Guingamp	22	9	4	9	29	32	−3	31	
6	Reims	22	9	3	10	34	42	−8	30 (Note: Reims finished ahead of Montpellier on head-to-head goal difference: Reims 0–1 Montpellier, Montpellier 0–4 Reims.)	
7	Montpellier	22	9	3	10	27	35	−8	30	
8	Dijon	22	8	2	12	24	37	−13	26	
9	Fleury	22	7	4	11	18	42	−24	25	
10	Soyaux	22	5	2	15	15	46	−31	17	
11	Issy	22	3	1	18	11	77	−66	10	
12	Le Havre (R)	22	2	2	18	14	49	−35	8	Relegation to Division 2 Féminine

Rules for classification: 1) points; 2) head-to-head points; 3) head-to-head goal difference; 4) goal difference; 5) goals scored
(C) Champions; (R) Relegated

== Cup competitions ==
=== 2020–21 Coupe de France ===
==== Final ====
19 May 2021
21:15 CEST

Monaco	0–2	Paris Saint-Germain
		Icardi 19'; Mbappé 81'

Stade de France, Saint-Denis
Attendance: 0 (Note: The final was played behind closed doors due to the COVID-19 pandemic in France.)
Referee: François Letexier

=== 2020 Trophée des Champions ===
13 January 2021
21:00 CET

Paris Saint-Germain	2–1	Marseille
Icardi 39'; Neymar 85' (pen.)	Report	Payet 89'

Stade Bollaert-Delelis, Lens
Attendance: 0 (Note: The match was played behind closed doors due to the COVID-19 pandemic in France.)
Referee: Ruddy Buquet
