= Marjana Naceva =

Macedonian footballer

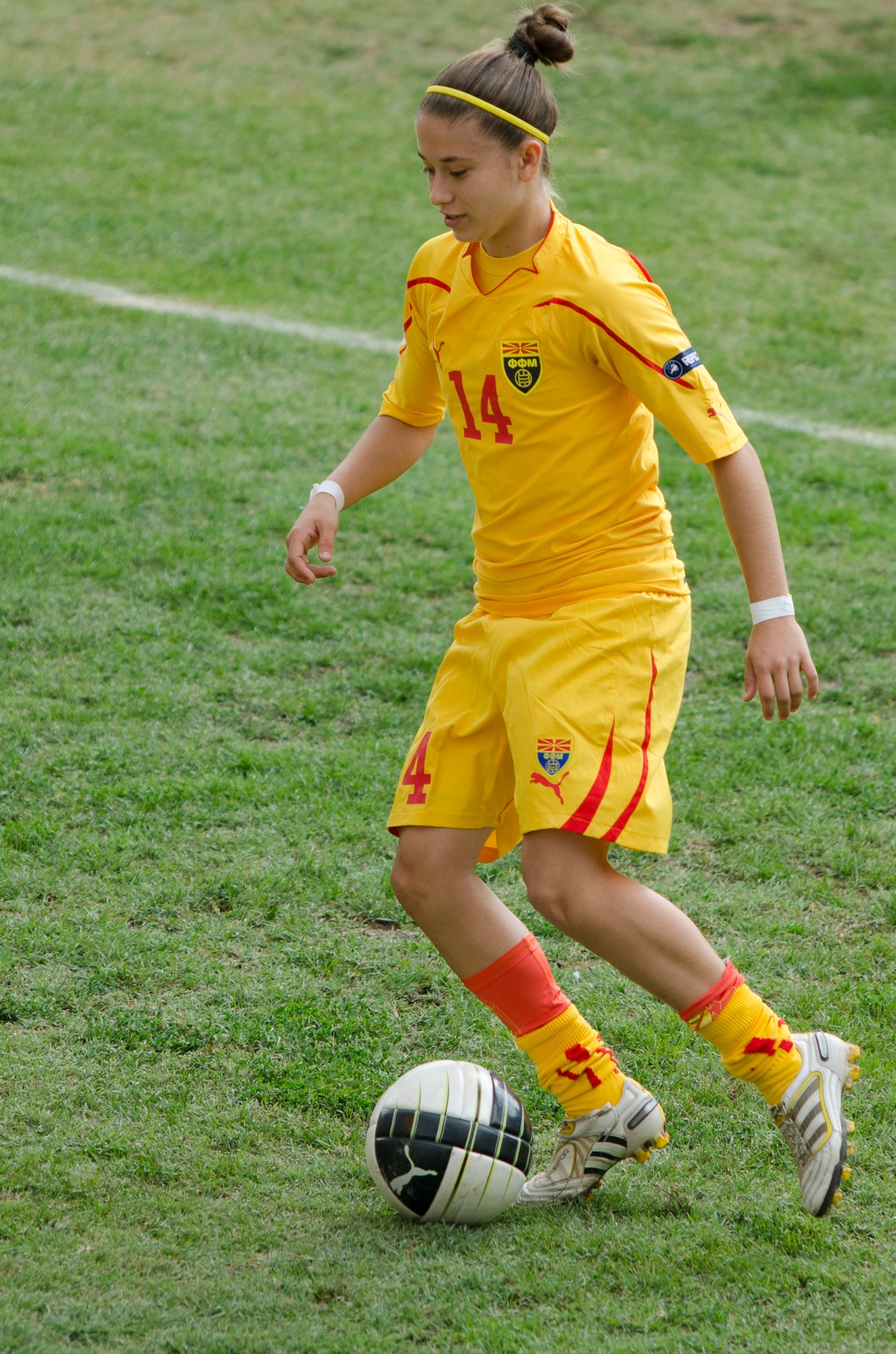
- Naceva in 2012

Personal information
- Full name: Marjana Naceva
- Date of birth: 16 January 1994 (age 32)
- Place of birth: Macedonia
- Position: Striker

Team information
- Current team: Borussia Dortmund
- Number: 99

Senior career*
Years	Team	Apps	(Gls)
- Borec Veles
2011–2016	Nase Taksi		
2016–2020	ŽFK Dragon 2014		
2020–2022	Kamenica Sasa		
2022–2025	Borussia Dortmund		

International career
2011–	North Macedonia	13	(0)
- * Club domestic league appearances and goals

Marjana Naceva (Macedonian: Марјана Нацева; born 16 January 1994) is a Macedonian football striker currently playing for Borussia Dortmund in the Westfalenliga. She previously played for Kamenica Sasa, taking part in the Champions League. She has been a member of the North Macedonia national football team since 2011.
