= Maja Angelovska =

Macedonian footballer (born 1994)

Personal information
- Date of birth: 12 February 1994 (age 32)
- Position: Defender

Team information
- Current team: Krim

Senior career*
Years	Team	Apps	(Gls)
- Dragon
- Olimpija Ljubljana
- Krim

International career^{‡}
2009–2010	North Macedonia U17	6	(0)
2010–2012	North Macedonia U19	6	(0)
2010–2020	North Macedonia	16	(0)
- * Club domestic league appearances and goals ‡ National team caps and goals as of 27 November 2020

Maja Angelovska (Macedonian: Маја Ангеловска; born 12 February 1994) is a Macedonian footballer who plays as a defender for Slovenian club Krim and the North Macedonia women's national team.
