= Dragana Kostova =

Macedonian footballer

Personal information
- Date of birth: 2 January 1991 (age 35)
- Position: Defender

Team information
- Current team: Dragon
- Number: 10

Senior career*
Years	Team	Apps	(Gls)
- Tikvešanka
- Naše Taksi
- Dragon

International career^{‡}
2007	Macedonia U17	3	(0)
200?–200?	Macedonia U19	6	(0)
2009–	North Macedonia	17	(0)
- * Club domestic league appearances and goals ‡ National team caps and goals as of 8 November 2019

Dragana Kostova (Macedonian: Драгана Костова; born 2 January 1991) is a Macedonian footballer who plays as a defender for 1. liga club ŽFK Dragon 2014 and the Macedonia women's national team.
