= Martina Bogleva =

Macedonian footballer

Personal information
- Date of birth: 7 October 1993 (age 33)
- Position: Midfielder

Senior career*
Years	Team	Apps	(Gls)
- Naše Taksi
- Dragon
- Istatov

International career^{‡}
2008	North Macedonia U17	1	(0)
2010–2011	North Macedonia U19	6	(0)
2012–2014	North Macedonia	3	(0)
- * Club domestic league appearances and goals ‡ National team caps and goals as of 17 September 2014

Martina Bogleva (Macedonian: Мартина Боглева; born 7 October 1993) is a Macedonian footballer who plays as a midfielder. She has been a member of the North Macedonia women's national team.
