= Jana Chubrinovska =

Macedonian footballer

Personal information
- Date of birth: 12 February 1999 (age 27)
- Position: Midfielder

Team information
- Current team: Istatov

Senior career*
Years	Team	Apps	(Gls)
- Istatov

International career^{‡}
2014–2015	North Macedonia U17	6	(0)
2016–2017	North Macedonia U19	6	(0)
2015–	North Macedonia	11	(0)
- * Club domestic league appearances and goals ‡ National team caps and goals as of 6 March 2020

Jana Chubrinovska (born 12 February 1999) is a Macedonian footballer who plays as a midfielder for 1. liga club ŽFK Istatov and the North Macedonia women's national team.
