= Ane Bošeska =

Macedonian footballer

Personal information
- Date of birth: 13 July 1997 (age 29)
- Position: Defender

Team information
- Current team: Tiverija

Senior career*
Years	Team	Apps	(Gls)
- Istatov
- Tiverija

International career^{‡}
2012–2013	Macedonia U17	6	(0)
2014–2015	Macedonia U19	6	(0)
2019–	North Macedonia	6	(0)
- * Club domestic league appearances and goals ‡ National team caps and goals as of 27 November 2020

Ane Bošeska (born 13 July 1997) is a Macedonian footballer who plays as a defender for 1. liga club ŽFK Tiverija Istatov and the North Macedonia women's national team.
