= Froska Kostova =

Macedonian footballer

Personal information
- Date of birth: 5 November 1988 (age 37)
- Position: Goalkeeper

Senior career*
| Years | Team | Apps | (Gls) |
- Shkiponjat
- Tikvesanka
- Naše Taksi
| 2014 | Mladost Orizari | | |
| 2015 | Kočani | | |
| 2015 | → Vllaznia (loan) | | |

International career^{‡}
| 2006 | North Macedonia U19 | 1 | (0) |
| 2010–2014 | North Macedonia | 12 | (0) |
- * Club domestic league appearances and goals ‡ National team caps and goals as of 15 September 2016

Froska Kostova (Macedonian: Фроска Костова; born 5 November 1988) is a Macedonian footballer who plays as a goalkeeper. She has been a member of the North Macedonia women's national team.
