= Sijce Andonova =

Macedonian footballer (born 1992)

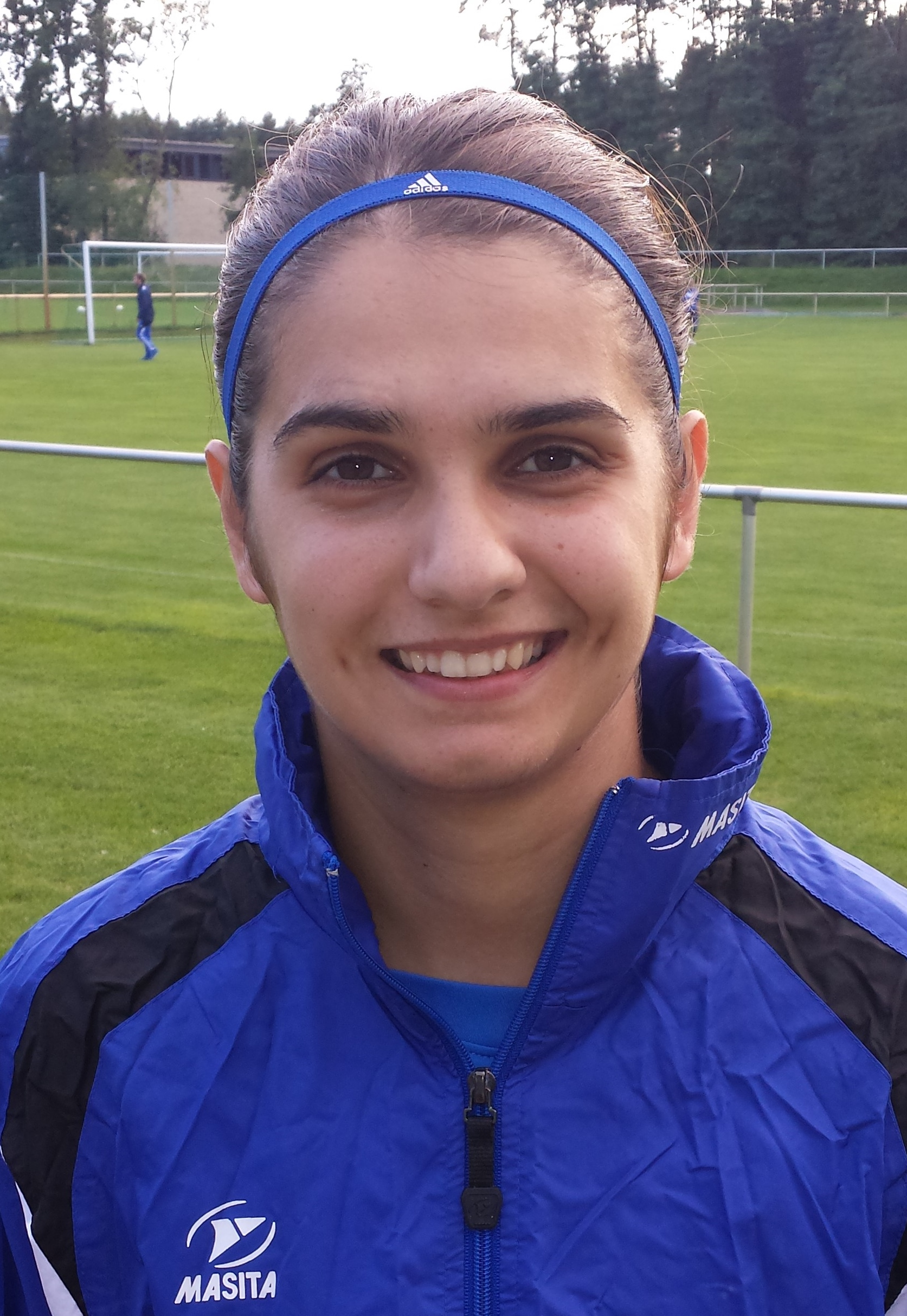

Personal information
- Date of birth: 27 November 1992 (age 33)
- Place of birth: Negotino, Republic of Macedonia
- Position: Midfielder

Team information
- Current team: Blau-Weiss Hohen Neuendorf

Senior career*
Years	Team	Apps	(Gls)
2004–2008	ZFK Tikvešanka		
2009–2010	Borec Veles		
2011–2013	Turbine Potsdam (II)		
2013–	Blau-Weiss Hohen Neuendorf		

International career
2007–2009	Macedonia U-17	9	(0)
2008–2011	Macedonia U-19	9	(0)
2009–	Macedonia	27	(0)
- * Club domestic league appearances and goals

Sijce Andonova (Macedonian: Сијче Андонова; born 27 November 1992) is a Macedonian football defender or midfielder who plays for Blau-Weiss Hohen Neuendorf of the German Second Bundesliga and the Macedonia national team. Her younger sister Nataša plays in Spain for FC Barcelona Femení.

Andonova started her football career in Macedonia for ZFK Tikvešanka. 2008 she played for Macedonian champions Shkiponjat in the Champions League. After playing two of three matches in the qualifying round, she returned to her previous club. With Tikvešanka she won a Macedonian league and cup double in 2009. Again she played with her team in the Champions League but could not qualify for the second round. After this she changed to Borec Veles, won the 2010 league and cup double and took part in another unsuccessful Champions League qualifying round.

In autumn 2010 she and sister Nataša travelled to Germany and on 1 January 2011 signed for German Frauen-Bundesliga champions and Champions League holders Turbine Potsdam. With Turbine she played 27 matches in 2 1/2 years for the second team in the German Second Bundesliga. In summer 2013 she transferred to Blau-Weiss Hohen Neuendorf.
