= Hristina Arsova =

Macedonian footballer (born 1985)

Personal information
- Date of birth: 7 February 1985 (age 41)
- Position: Defender

International career^{‡}
Years	Team	Apps	(Gls)
2009–2010	North Macedonia	2	(0)
- ‡ National team caps and goals as of 10:41, 21 September 2021 (UTC)

Hristina Arsova (born 7 February 1985) is a Macedonian footballer who plays as a defender for the North Macedonia national team.

== International career ==
Arsova made her debut for the North Macedonia national team on 19 September 2009, coming on as a substitute for Afrodita Salihi against Slovakia.
