= Milka Arsova =

Macedonian footballer (born 1989)

Personal information
- Date of birth: 5 May 1989 (age 37)
- Position: Defender

Senior career*
| Years | Team | Apps | (Gls) |
- Shkiponjat
- Naše Taksi
- Kočani

International career^{‡}
| 2005–200? | Macedonia U19 | 9 | (0) |
| 200?–2015 | Macedonia | 10 | (0) |
- * Club domestic league appearances and goals ‡ National team caps and goals as of 29 November 2015

Milka Arsova (Macedonian: Милка Арсова; born 5 May 1989) is a Macedonian footballer who plays as a defender. She has been a member of the Macedonia women's national team.
