= Valerija Valjak =

Macedonian footballer

Personal information
- Date of birth: 2 January 1988 (age 38)
- Position: Defender

International career^{‡}
Years	Team	Apps	(Gls)
2009–2010	North Macedonia	3	(0)
- ‡ National team caps and goals as of 12:34, 19 September 2021 (UTC)

Valerija Valjak (born 2 January 1988) is a Macedonian footballer who plays as a defender for the North Macedonia national team.

== International career ==
Valjak made her debut for the North Macedonia national team on 27 March 2010, against Norway.
