= Teodora Gjorgjevska =

Macedonian footballer

Personal information
- Date of birth: 19 March 2000 (age 26)
- Position: Defender

Team information
- Current team: Dragon

Senior career*
Years	Team	Apps	(Gls)
2018–	Dragon		

International career^{‡}
2015–2016	North Macedonia U-17	6	(0)
2017–2018	North Macedonia U-19	5	(0)
2021–	North Macedonia	4	(0)
- * Club domestic league appearances and goals ‡ National team caps and goals as of 19:39, 4 April 2023 (UTC)

Teodora Gjorgjevska (Macedonian: Теодора Ѓорѓевска, Teodora Đorđevska; born 19 March 2000) is a Macedonian footballer who plays as a defender for Dragon and the North Macedonia national team.

== International career ==
Gjorgjevska made her debut for the North Macedonia national team on 25 November 2021, against Northern Ireland.
