= Afrodita Salihi =

Macedonian footballer (born 1989)

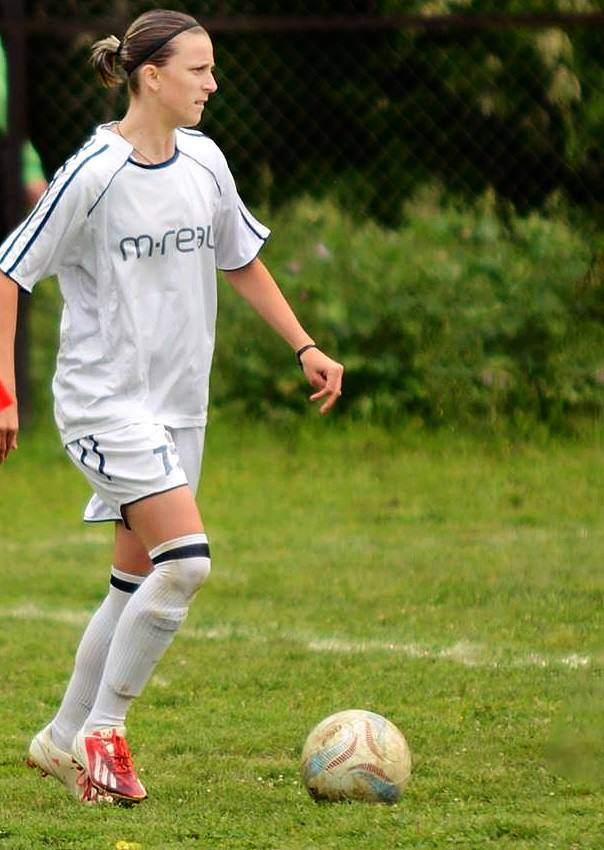

Personal information
- Full name: Afrodita Salihi
- Date of birth: 11 April 1989 (age 37)
- Place of birth: Skopje, Yugoslavia (now North Macedonia)
- Height: 1.60 m (5 ft 3 in)
- Position: Forward

Team information
- Current team: Dragon
- Number: 11

Senior career*
Years	Team	Apps	(Gls)
–	ŽFK Škiponjat		
2010–2011	ŽFK Naše Taksi		
2011	Olympia Sofia		
2011–2012	ŽFK Edinstvo		
2012–201?	ŽFK Kočani		
201?–	Dragon		

International career^{‡}
–	Macedonia U19		
2009–	North Macedonia	32	(4)
- * Club domestic league appearances and goals ‡ National team caps and goals as of 27 November 2020

Afrodita Salihi (born 11 April 1989) is a Macedonian footballer who plays as a forward for ŽFK Dragon 2014. She is a member of the North Macedonia women's national football team.

== Club career ==
Amongst the teams Salihi played for were ŽFK Škiponjat, ŽFK Naše Taksi, Olympia Sofia and ŽFK Edinstvo.

== International goals ==
Goals scored for the Macedonian WNT in official competitions
Competition	Stage	Date	Location	Opponent	Goals	Result	Overall
2011 FIFA World Cup	Qualifiers	2009–10–29	Zwolle	Netherlands	1	1–13	1
2013 UEFA Euro	Qualifiers	2011–03–05	Strumica	Luxembourg	1	5–1	2
2013 UEFA Euro	Qualifiers	2011–11–19	Prilep	Bosnia and Herzegovina	1	2–6	2
2015 FIFA World Cup	Qualifiers	2014–08–21	Mogoșoaia	Romania	1	1–6	1
