= Suarta Rechi =

Macedonian footballer

Syarta Rechi
Personal information
- Date of birth: 9 November 2000 (age 26)
- Place of birth: Struga, Macedonia
- Height: 1.69 m (5 ft 7 in)
- Position: Goalkeeper

Team information
- Current team: Žfk As Junajted
- Number: 99

International career^{‡}
Years	Team	Apps	(Gls)
2015–2016	North Macedonia U-17	4	(0)
2017–2018	North Macedonia U-19	6	(0)
2020–	North Macedonia	1	(0)
- ‡ National team caps and goals as of 11:37, 21 September 2021 (UTC)

Syarta Rechi (Macedonian: Суарта Речи; born 9 November 2000), also known as Syarta Dervishi in some sources, is a Macedonian footballer who plays as a goalkeeper for 1.liga club Žfk As Junajted and the North Macedonia national team.

== International career ==
Suarta Rechi has played Champion Women's League with team : Žfk Istatov North Macedonia.

Friendly games, Tournaments and Qualitifications for : National team of Macedonia U17 - 24 games. National team of Macedonia U19 - 25 games, and she is part of A national team of North Macedonia since 2019.

Rechi made her debut for the North Macedonia national team on 17 September 2021, against England. North Macedonia lost the match 8–0 but Rechi did receive some praise for her performance.
