= Hava Mustafa =

Macedonian footballer

Personal information
- Date of birth: 20 September 1997 (age 29)
- Position: Forward

Team information
- Current team: Shkëndija

Senior career*
Years	Team	Apps	(Gls)
- Shkëndija

International career^{‡}
2019–	North Macedonia	7	(0)
- * Club domestic league appearances and goals ‡ National team caps and goals as of 27 November 2020

Hava Mustafa (Macedonian: Хава Мустафа; born 20 September 1997) is a Macedonian footballer who plays as a forward for 1. liga club ŽFK Ljuboten and the North Macedonia women's national team.

== International goals ==
No.	Date	Venue	Opponent	Score	Result	Competition
1.	9 June 2026	Petar Miloševski Football Stadium, Bitola, North Macedonia	Azerbaijan	1–1	1–3	2027 FIFA Women's World Cup qualification
