= Dragana Gegova =

Macedonian footballer

Personal information
- Date of birth: 18 June 2000 (age 26)
- Positions: Defender; midfielder

Team information
- Current team: Dragon

Senior career*
Years	Team	Apps	(Gls)
2019–	Dragon		

International career^{‡}
2015–2016	Macedonia U-17	4	(0)
2017	Macedonia U-19	3	(0)
2020–	North Macedonia	2	(0)
- * Club domestic league appearances and goals ‡ National team caps and goals as of 11:06, 19 September 2021 (UTC)

Dragana Gegova (born 18 June 2000) is a Macedonian footballer who plays as a defender and midfielder for Dragon and the North Macedonia national team.

== International career ==
Gegova made her debut for the North Macedonia national team on 27 November 2020, coming on as a substitute for Teodora Dimoska against Kazakhstan.
