= Mladena Petrova =

Macedonian footballer

Personal information
- Date of birth: 10 February 1993 (age 33)
- Position: Midfielder

International career^{‡}
Years	Team	Apps	(Gls)
2010–2011	North Macedonia U-19	9	(2)
2009–2012	North Macedonia	15	(0)
- ‡ National team caps and goals as of 09:27, 21 September 2021 (UTC)

Mladena Petrova (born 10 February 1993) is a Macedonian footballer who plays as a midfielder for the North Macedonia national team.

== International career ==
Petrova made her debut for the North Macedonia national team on 19 September 2009, against Slovakia.
