= Hristina Joshevska =

Macedonian footballer

Personal information
- Date of birth: 27 December 2000 (age 25)
- Position: Defender

Team information
- Current team: Kamenica Sasa
- Number: 69

Senior career*
| Years | Team | Apps | (Gls) |
| 2020– | Kamenica Sasa | | |

International career^{‡}
| 2016 | Macedonia U17 | 3 | (0) |
| 2017–2018 | Macedonia U19 | 4 | (0) |
| 2020– | North Macedonia | 2 | (0) |
- * Club domestic league appearances and goals ‡ National team caps and goals as of 23 October 2020

Hristina Joshevska (Macedonian: Христина Јошевска; born 27 December 2000) is a Macedonian footballer who plays as a defender for 1. liga club Kamenica Sasa and the North Macedonia women's national team.

== Club career ==
Joshevska has played for Kamenica Sasa in North Macedonia at the UEFA Women's Champions League.

== International career ==
Joshevska capped for North Macedonia at senior level during the UEFA Women's Euro 2022 qualifying.
