= Dzejljane Sakiri =

Macedonian footballer

Personal information
- Date of birth: 12 September 1988 (age 38)
- Position: Defender

Senior career*
Years	Team	Apps	(Gls)
- Shkiponjat
- Naše Taksi

International career^{‡}
2004–2006	North Macedonia U19	9	(0)
2009	North Macedonia	1	(0)
- * Club domestic league appearances and goals ‡ National team caps and goals as of 29 October 2009

Dzejljane Sakiri (born 12 September 1988) is a Macedonian footballer who plays as a defender. She has been a member of the North Macedonia women's national team.

== International career ==
Sakiri capped for North Macedonia at senior level during the 2011 FIFA Women's World Cup qualification – UEFA Group 2, in a 1–13 away loss to the Netherlands on 29 October 2009.
