= Vesna Vitanova =

Macedonian footballer

Personal information
- Date of birth: 27 January 1987 (age 39)
- Position: Goalkeeper

Senior career*
Years	Team	Apps	(Gls)
- Shkiponjat
- Naše Taksi

International career^{‡}
2003–2005	North Macedonia U19	7	(0)
200?–2012	North Macedonia	6	(0)
- * Club domestic league appearances and goals ‡ National team caps and goals as of 20 June 2012

Vesna Vitanova (Macedonian: Весна Витанова; born 27 January 1987) is a Macedonian footballer who plays as a goalkeeper. She has been a member of the North Macedonia women's national team.
