= Gentjana Rochi =

Macedonian footballer

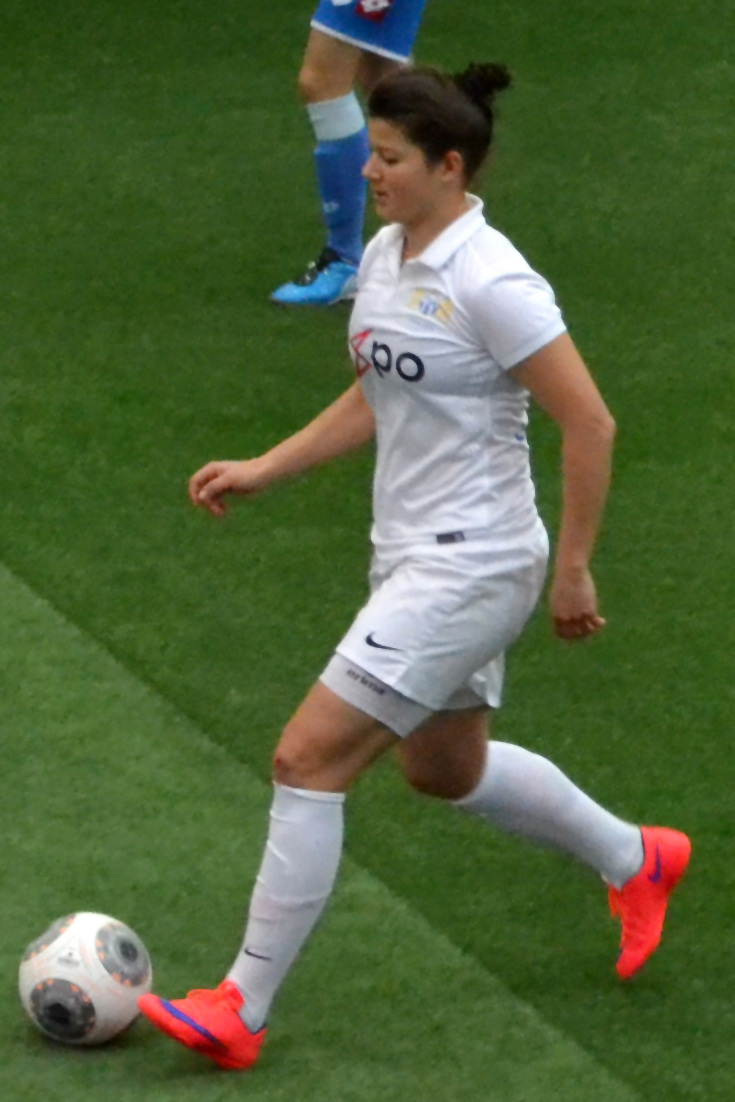
- Rochi in 2016

Personal information
- Date of birth: 17 September 1994 (age 32)
- Place of birth: Struga, Macedonia
- Position: Striker

Team information
- Current team: KuPS
- Number: 7

Senior career*
Years	Team	Apps	(Gls)
2010–2011	FK Borec		
2011–2012	Naše Taksi		
2012–2014	Cloppenburg	26	(8)
2016	Bayer Leverkusen II	4	(4)
2016–2017	Bayer Leverkusen	1	(0)
2017	→ Cloppenburg (loan)	1	(0)
2017–2018	JyPK	42	(39)
2019–	KuPS	168	(130)

International career
2010–	North Macedonia	57	(23)
- * Club domestic league appearances and goals

Gentjana Rochi (Macedonian: Гентјана Рочи, Albanian: Gentjana Roçi; also spelled Rochi, born 17 September 1994) is a Macedonian footballer who plays as a striker for Finnish Naisten Liiga club Kuopion Palloseura and the North Macedonia women's national team.

== Early life ==
Rochi was born to an ethnic Albanian family in Struga.

== Club career ==
Rochi has played in the Macedonian Championship for FK Borec and ŽFK Naše Taksi, with which she also played the Champions League, and in the German 2nd Bundesliga for BV Cloppenburg.

== International goals ==
No.	Date	Venue	Opponent	Score	Result	Competition
1.	5 March 2011	Stadion Mladost, Strumica, North Macedonia	Luxembourg	5–1	5–1	UEFA Women's Euro 2013 qualifying
2.	8 March 2011	Stadion Kukuš, Strumica, North Macedonia	Latvia	1–0	1–0	UEFA Women's Euro 2013 qualifying
3.	19 November 2011	Stadion Goce Delčev, Prilep, North Macedonia	Bosnia and Herzegovina	2–5	2–6	UEFA Women's Euro 2013 qualifying
4.	4 April 2012	Nea Smyrni Stadium, Athens, Greece	Greece	1–0	2–2	UEFA Women's Euro 2013 qualifying
5.	4 April 2012	Nea Smyrni Stadium, Athens, Greece	Greece	2–2	2–2	UEFA Women's Euro 2013 qualifying
6.	26 October 2013	Stadion Mladost, Strumica, North Macedonia	Czech Republic	1–2	1–3	2015 FIFA Women's World Cup qualification
7.	27 October 2015	Petar Miloševski Training Centre, Skopje, North Macedonia	Scotland	1–4	1–4	UEFA Women's Euro 2017 qualifying
8.	2 October 2019	Petar Miloševski Training Centre, Skopje, North Macedonia	Kazakhstan	2–0	4–1	UEFA Women's Euro 2022 qualifying
9.	2 October 2019	Petar Miloševski Training Centre, Skopje, North Macedonia	Kazakhstan	4–1	4–1	UEFA Women's Euro 2022 qualifying
10.	6 March 2020	Stadion FK Kolubara, Belgrade, Serbia	Serbia	1–2	1–8	UEFA Women's Euro 2022 qualifying
11.	27 November 2020	Almaty Central Stadium, Almaty, Kazakhstan	Kazakhstan	1–0	3–0	UEFA Women's Euro 2022 qualifying
12.	27 November 2020	Almaty Central Stadium, Almaty, Kazakhstan	Kazakhstan	2–0	3–0	UEFA Women's Euro 2022 qualifying
13.	21 October 2021	Daugava Stadium, Riga, Latvia	Latvia	1–0	4–1	2023 FIFA Women's World Cup qualification
14.	26 October 2021	SRC Biljanini Izvori, Ohrid, North Macedonia	Luxembourg	1–1	2–3	2023 FIFA Women's World Cup qualification
15.	12 April 2022	Stade Émile Mayrisch, Esch-sur-Alzette, Luxembourg	Luxembourg	1–0	1–2	2023 FIFA Women's World Cup qualification
16.	1 September 2022	Petar Miloševski Training Centre, Skopje, North Macedonia	Latvia	3–1	3–2	2023 FIFA Women's World Cup qualification
17.	18 February 2023	Gold City Sport Complex, Alanya, Turkey	Bulgaria	1–0	1–2	2023 Turkish Women's Cup
18.	5 April 2024	LNK Sporta Parks, Riga, Latvia	Latvia	1–1	4–3	UEFA Women's Euro 2025 qualifying
19.	30 November 2024	Petar Miloševski Training Centre, Skopje, North Macedonia	Montenegro	2–1	3–2	Friendly

== Career statistics ==
=== Club ===
Club	Season	Division	League		Cup		Continental		Total	
Club	Season	Division	Apps	Goals	Apps	Goals	Apps	Goals	Apps	Goals
Naš Taksi	2011-12	Macedonian Women's league					3	1	3	1
Cloppenbourg	2012-13	2 Bundesliga Frauen	16	8	1	1			17	9
Cloppenbourg	2013-14	Bundesliga Frauen	10	0	2	1			12	1
Cloppenbourg	2016-17	2 Bundesliga Frauen	1	0	1	0			2	0
Cloppenbourg	Total		27	8	4	2			31	10
Bayern Leverkusen	2016-17	Bundesliga Frauen	1	0					1	0
Bayern Leverkusen 2	2016-17	2 Bundesliga Frauen	4	4					4	4
JyPK	2017	Kansallinen Liiga	22	19					22	19
JyPK	2018	Kansallinen Liiga	20	20					20	20
JyPK	Total		42	39					42	39
KuPS	2019	Kansallinen Liiga	21	12					21	12
KuPS	2020	Kansallinen Liiga	17	16					17	16
KuPS	2021	Kansallinen Liiga	23	26	3	4			26	30
KuPS	2022	Kansallinen Liiga	22	22	2	2	3	2	27	26
KuPS	2023	Kansallinen Liiga	20	13	3	9	2	0	25	22
KuPS	2024	Kansallinen Liiga	22	15	2	0	2	1	26	16
KuPS	2025	Kansallinen Liiga	22	11	1	1	2	1	25	13
KuPS	2026	Kansallinen Liiga	21	15	1	1			22	16
KuPS	Total		168	130	12	17	9	4	189	151
Total career			242	181	16	19	12	5	270	205
