= Elma Shemsovikj =

Macedonian footballer

Personal information
- Date of birth: 4 February 1999 (age 27)
- Position: Midfielder

Team information
- Current team: Dragon
- Number: 6

Senior career*
Years	Team	Apps	(Gls)
- Dragon

International career^{‡}
2014–2015	North Macedonia U17	5	(0)
2016–2017	North Macedonia U19	5	(0)
2016–	North Macedonia	8	(1)
- * Club domestic league appearances and goals ‡ National team caps and goals as of 27 November 2020

Elma Shemsovikj (Macedonian: Елма Шемсовиќ, Elma Šemsović; born 4 February 1999) is a Macedonian footballer who plays as a midfielder for 1. liga club ŽFK Dragon 2014 and the North Macedonia women's national team.
