= Eli Jakovska =

Macedonian footballer (born 1995)

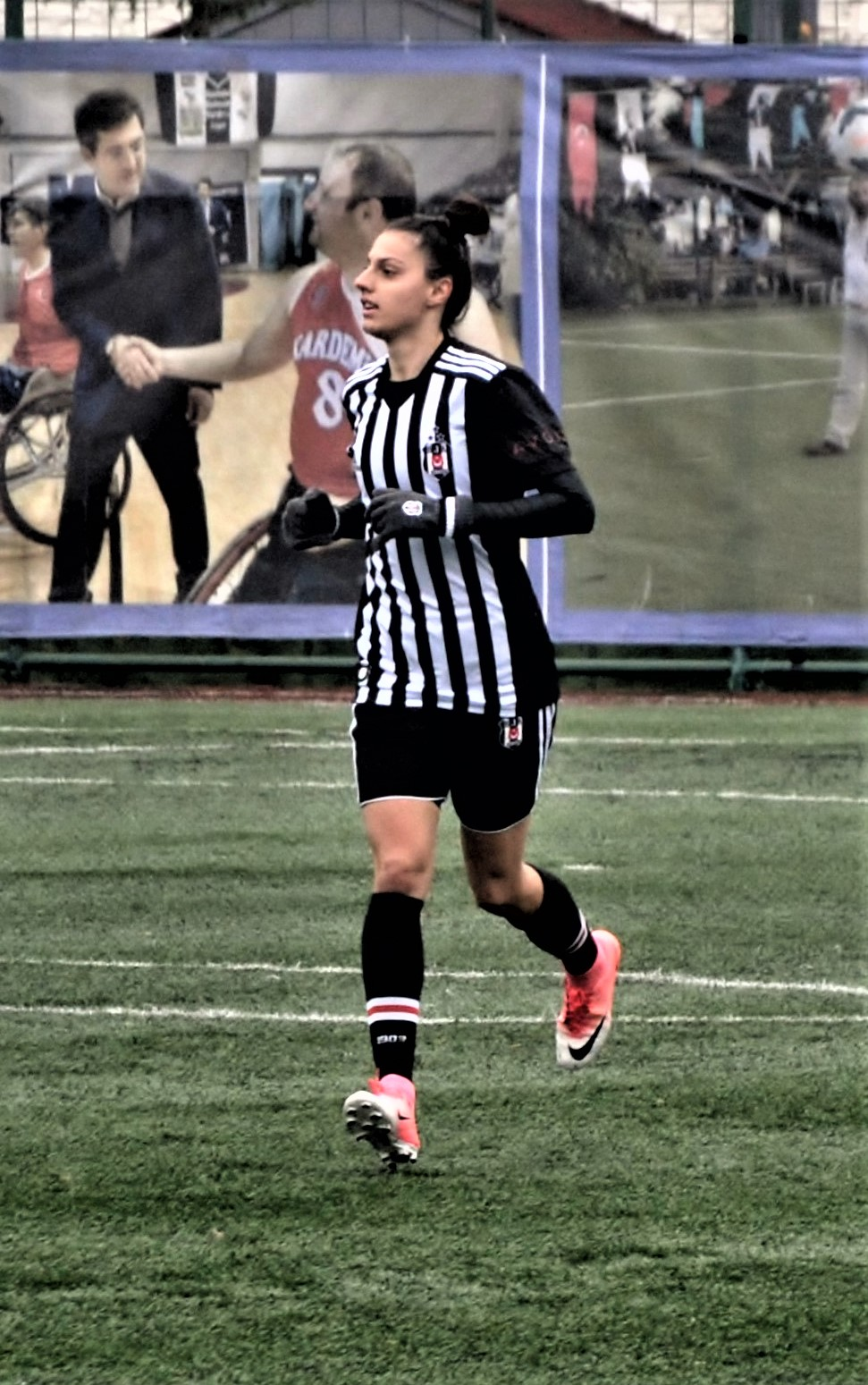
- Jakovska playing for Beşiktaş in the 2017–18 season

Personal information
- Date of birth: 16 May 1995 (age 31)
- Place of birth: Probištip, Macedonia
- Position: Forward

Team information
- Current team: WFC Lokomotiv Stara Zagora

Senior career*
Years	Team	Apps	(Gls)
2014–2015	ŽFK Kočani		
2015	ŽFK Dragon 2014		
2015–2017	ŽFK Spartak Subotica		
2017	ŽFK Istatov 2015		
2017–2018	Beşiktaş J.K.	6	(3)
2019	Konak Belediyespor	7	(4)
2020–2021	WFC Lokomotiv Stara Zagora		

International career^{‡}
2010–2011	Macedonia U17	5	(1)
2012–2013	Macedonia U19	6	(1)
2014–present	North Macedonia	15	(2)
- * Club domestic league appearances and goals as of 8 December 2019 ‡ National team caps and goals as of 23 June 2017

Eli Jakovska (Macedonian: Ели Јаковска, born 16 May 1995) is a Macedonian footballer, who played for WFC Lokomotiv Stara Zagora in Bulgaria in the 2020–21 season.

== Club career ==
In 2015, Jakovska played for ŽFK Dragon 2014. She took part at the 2015–16 UEFA Women's Champions League qualifying round – Group 2 matches for ŽFK Dragon 2014. In 2017, she captained ŽFK Istatov 2015, and won the Macedonian Cup.

She then moved to Turkey and signed with the Istanbul-based club Beşiktaş J.K. on 9 November 2017. She left the club after appearing in six matches and scoring three goals. In the 2019-20 Turkish Women's First Football League season, she joined the İzmir-based club Konak Belediyespor.

== International career ==
Jakovska was a member of the Macedonian U-17 and U-19 teams; she currently plays for the Macedonian national team.
