= ŽFK Naše Taksi =

ЖФК "Наше Такси" ŽFK "Naše Taksi"
- Full name: Ženski fudbalski klub Naše Taksi Skopje
- Nickname: Шоферки (Shoferki)
- Founded: 19 July 2010
- Dissolved: 2012
- Chairman: Kristijan Kosev
- Manager: Blagoja Filiposki
- League: Premier league
- 2011-12: 1st (champions)
| Home colours | Away colours |

ZFK Naše Taksi (Macedonian: Женски фудбалски клуб Наше Такси, meaning Our Taxi) was a women's football club from Skopje the capital of North Macedonia. Founded in 2010, the team started directly in the Macedonian women's football championship and went on to win its first championship and the national cup. They defended both titles the next year and played two seasons in the UEFA Women's Champions League qualifying round. The club dissolved before the start of the next season.

== History ==
The founding of the club was decided on 19 June 2010 with the official documents filed on 15 July 2010. At that time the club became Skopje's only women's football club, though earlier clubs existed in the city.

The club was dissolved in 2012.

== Titles ==
- (North Macedonia) Macedonian Women's Football Championship
  - Winners (2): 2010–11, 2011–12
- (North Macedonia) Macedonian Women's Cup:
  - Winners (2): 2010–11, 2011–12

== Squad ==
The 2011–12 champions league squad.

Note: Flags indicate national team as defined under FIFA eligibility rules; some limited exceptions apply. Players may hold more than one non-FIFA nationality.

| No. | Pos. | Nation | Player |
|---|---|---|---|
| 1 | GK | MKD | Vesna Vitanova |
| 12 | GK | MKD | Ivana Avramoska |
| 18 | GK | MKD | Froska Kostova |
| 21 | GK | MKD | Viktorija Doneva |
| 2 | DF | MKD | Dzejljane Sakiri |
| 3 | DF | MKD | Aneta Georgieva |
| 5 | DF | MKD | Milka Arsova |
| 6 | DF | MKD | Hristina Arsova |
| 13 | DF | MKD | Marina Arsovska |
| 16 | DF | MKD | Dragana Kostova |
| 19 | DF | MKD | Daniela Ristevska |
| 20 | DF | MKD | Nikolina Radevska |
| 24 | DF | MKD | Simona Nikolovska |

| No. | Pos. | Nation | Player |
|---|---|---|---|
| 4 | MF | MKD | Katerina Mileska |
| 8 | MF | MKD | Lenche Andreevska |
| 9 | MF | MKD | Shireta Brahimi |
| 10 | MF | MKD | Maja Stankovska |
| 14 | MF | MKD | Marjana Naceva |
| 15 | MF | MKD | Radica Dukova |
| 17 | MF | MKD | Martina Bogleva |
| 23 | MF | MKD | Dragana Saltirova |
| 7 | FW | MKD | Gentjana Rochi |
| 11 | FW | MKD | Violeta Spirovska |
| 22 | FW | MKD | Naksie Krivanjeva |
| 25 | FW | MKD | Eli Jakovska |

== UEFA Competitions Record ==
The team made its European debut in 2011 when they hosted a mini-tournament for the 2011–12 UEFA Women's Champions League. With two wins and a 1–3 loss against top seeded women's team of BSC Young Boys they took a second place. Narrowly missing the round of 32 by goal difference in comparison of the best runners-up.

| Competition | Round | Country | Club | Result |
|---|---|---|---|---|
| 2011–12 UEFA Women's Champions League | Qualifying round | (Switzerland) | YB Frauen | 1–3 |
| 2011–12 UEFA Women's Champions League | Qualifying round | (Greece) | PAOK | 1–0 |
| 2011–12 UEFA Women's Champions League | Qualifying round | (Moldova) | Goliador Chişinău | 6–0 |
| 2012–13 UEFA Women's Champions League | Qualifying round | (Greece) | PAOK | 0–1 |
| 2012–13 UEFA Women's Champions League | Qualifying round | (Hungary) | MTK | 0–8 |
| 2012–13 UEFA Women's Champions League | Qualifying round | (Latvia) | Skonto/Ceriba | 5–2 |
