= Zoran Zlatkovski =

Macedonian footballer (born 1987)

Personal information
- Date of birth: 5 April 1987 (age 39)
- Place of birth: Makedonska Kamenica, SFR Yugoslavia
- Height: 1.83 m (6 ft 0 in)
- Position: Forward

Team information
- Current team: ŽFK Kamenica Sasa (head coach)

Senior career*
Years	Team	Apps	(Gls)
2004–2005	Pirin Blagoevgrad	14	(0)
2005–2007	Lokomotiv Plovdiv	26	(11)
2008	Slavia Sofia	13	(1)
2009	Vihren Sandanski	12	(1)
2009–2010	Pirin Blagoevgrad	30	(6)
2011	Ludogorets Razgrad	6	(1)
2011–2012	Malavan	10	(1)
2013	Bregalnica Štip	13	(4)
2013–2014	Lamia	25	(12)
2014–2015	Panachaiki	14	(4)
2016	Akademija Pandev		
2016	Kavala		
2017–2019	Sasa		

International career
	Macedonia U21	8	(0)

Managerial career
- 2017–: ŽFK Kamenica Sasa
- * Club domestic league appearances and goals

Zoran Zlatkovski (Macedonian: Зоран Златковски; born 5 April 1987) is a Macedonian football coach and former player who played as a forward. He is the president and manager of women's club ŽFK Kamenica Sasa.

== Club career ==
Zlatkovski first club was Bulgarian side Pirin. Between 2005 and 2007 he played in Lokomotiv Plovdiv. In January 2008 Zlatkovski signed with Slavia Sofia.

== Managerial career ==
In June 2017, Zlatkovski formed a women's football club, ŽFK Kamenica Sasa, of whom he became head coach.
