= Élisa De Almeida =

French footballer (born 1998)

Élisa de Almeida
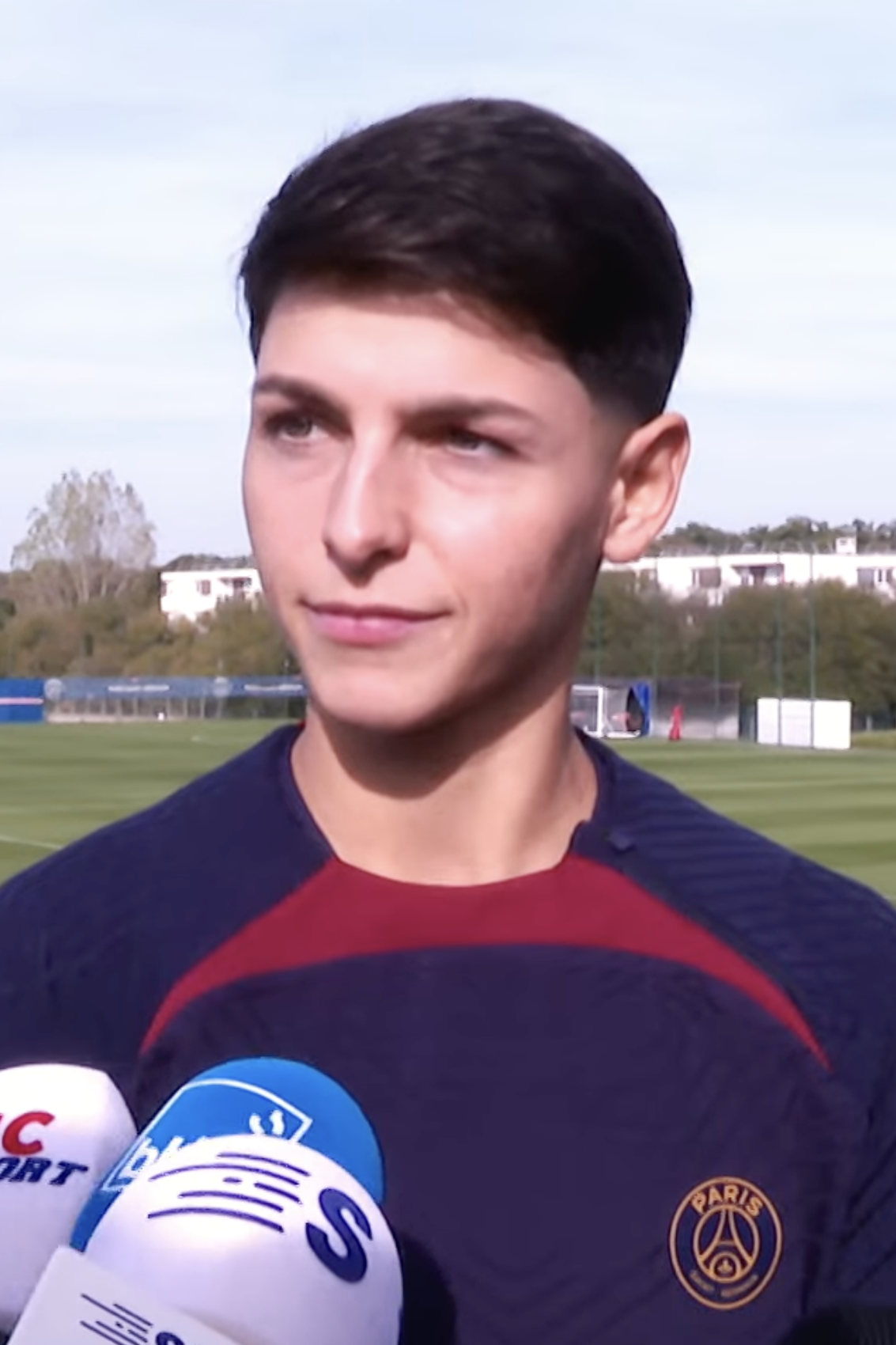
- De Almeida with Paris Saint-Germain in 2023

Personal information
- Full name: Élisa Flore de Almeida
- Date of birth: 11 January 1998 (age 28)
- Place of birth: Châtenay-Malabry, France
- Height: 5 ft 7 in (1.71 m)
- Positions: Centre-back; right-back

Team information
- Current team: Arsenal
- Number: 5

Youth career
- 2004–2012: SC Épinay-sur-Orge
- 2012–2013: Villebon SF
- 2013–2016: Juvisy

Senior career*
Years	Team	Apps	(Gls)
2016–2019	Paris FC (Note: Known as FCF Juvisy until July 2017)	39	(0)
2019–2021	Montpellier	30	(3)
2021–2026	Paris Saint-Germain	85	(2)
2026–	Arsenal	6	(0)

International career^{‡}
2015	France U17	6	(1)
2016–2017	France U19	12	(0)
2017–2018	France U20	11	(0)
2019–2022	France U23	5	(0)
2019–	France	52	(5)
Medal record
Women's football
Representing France
UEFA Women's Nations League
Runner-up	2024
Third place	2025
UEFA Women's Under-19 Championship
Winner	2016 Slovakia
Runner-up	2017 Northern Ireland
- * Club domestic league appearances and goals as of 22 November 2026 ‡ National team caps and goals as of 18 April 2026

Élisa Flore de Almeida (born 11 January 1998) is a French professional footballer who plays as a centre-back or right-back for Women's Super League club Arsenal and the France national team.

== Club career ==
De Almeida is a youth academy graduate of Juvisy. She made her professional debut for the club on 10 December 2016 in a 3–0 defeat to Paris Saint-Germain. In June 2019, she joined Montpellier.

On 9 July 2021, Paris Saint-Germain announced the signing of De Almeida on a three-year deal. She scored her first goal for the club on 16 December 2022 in a 2–1 win over Real Madrid. On 8 July 2024, she extended her contract with the club until June 2027.

On 3 September 2026, De Almeida joined Women's Super League club Arsenal.

== International career ==
Born in France, De Almeida is of Portuguese descent. She has represented France at various youth levels and won the 2016 UEFA Women's Under-19 Championship.

De Almeida made her senior team debut for France on 4 October 2019 in a 4–0 friendly win over Iceland. In July 2023, she was included in the squad for the 2023 FIFA Women's World Cup. In July 2024, she was named in France's squad for the 2024 Olympics. In June 2025, she was named in the squad for the UEFA Women's Euro 2025.

== Career statistics ==
=== Club ===
As of match played 22 November 2026

Appearances and goals by club, season and competition
Club	Season	League			National cup (Note: Includes Coupe de France Féminine, Women's FA Cup)		League cup (Note: Includes Coupe LFFP)		Continental		Other		Total	
Club	Season	Division	Apps	Goals	Apps	Goals	Apps	Goals	Apps	Goals	Apps	Goals	Apps	Goals
Paris FC	2016–17	Première Ligue	6	0	0	0	—		—		—		6	0
Paris FC	2017–18	Première Ligue	17	0	2	0	—		—		—		19	0
Paris FC	2018–19	Première Ligue	16	0	3	0	—		—		—		19	0
Paris FC	Total		39	0	5	0	0	0	0	0	0	0	44	0
Montpellier	2019–20	Première Ligue	10	0	0	0	—		—		—		10	0
Montpellier	2020–21	Première Ligue	20	3	1	0	—		—		—		21	3
Montpellier	Total		30	3	1	0	0	0	0	0	0	0	31	3
Paris Saint-Germain	2021–22	Première Ligue	18	0	5	0	—		8 (Note: Appearances in UEFA Women's Champions League)	0	—		31	0
Paris Saint-Germain	2022–23	Première Ligue	18	0	4	0	—		7	1	1 (Note: Appearance in Trophée des Championnes)	0	30	1
Paris Saint-Germain	2023–24	Première Ligue	14	1	3	0	—		12	0	3 (Note: Two appearances in playoffs, one appearance in Trophée des Championnes)	0	32	1
Paris Saint-Germain	2024–25	Première Ligue	17	1	5	0	—		2	0	2 (Note: Appearance(s) in playoffs)	0	26	1
Paris Saint-Germain	2025–26	Première Ligue	18	0	5	0	3	0	6	0	1	0	33	0
Paris Saint-Germain	2026–27	Première Ligue	0	0	0	0	0	0	2	0	—		2	0
Paris Saint-Germain	Total		85	2	22	0	3	0	37	1	7	0	154	3
Arsenal	2026–27	Women's Super League	6	0	0	0	—		2	0	—		8	0
Career total			160	5	28	0	3	0	39	1	7	0	237	6

=== International ===
As of match played 18 April 2026

Appearances and goals by national team and year
National team	Year	Apps	Goals
France	2019	1	0
France	2020	6	3
France	2021	7	0
France	2022	2	0
France	2023	12	0
France	2024	9	1
France	2025	13	1
France	2026	2	0
Total		52	5

Scores and results list France's goal tally first, score column indicates score after each de Almeida goal.

List of international goals scored by Élisa de Almeida
No.	Date	Venue	Opponent	Score	Result	Competition
1	22 September 2020	Toše Proeski Arena, Skopje, North Macedonia	North Macedonia	7–0	7–0	2022 UEFA Women's Euro qualification
2	23 October 2020	Stade de la Source, Orléans, France	North Macedonia	4–0	11–0	2022 UEFA Women's Euro qualification
3	1 December 2020	Stade de la Rabine, Vannes, France	Kazakhstan	1–0	12–0	2022 UEFA Women's Euro qualification
4	31 May 2024	St James' Park, Newcastle, England	England	1–1	2–1	2025 UEFA Women's Euro qualification
5	30 May 2025	Stade Marcel Picot, Tomblaine, France	Switzerland	2–0	4–0	2025 UEFA Women's Nations League

== Honours ==
Paris Saint-Germain

- Coupe de France Féminine: 2021–22, 2023–24

France

- UEFA Women's Nations League runner-up: 2023–24

Individual

- UNFP Première Ligue team of the year: 2022–23, 2023–24
- LFFP Première Ligue team of the season: 2022–23, 2023–24
