= Aneta Georgieva =

Macedonian footballer

Personal information
- Date of birth: 15 February 1994 (age 32)
- Place of birth: Skopje, Macedonia
- Position: Forward

International career^{‡}
Years	Team	Apps	(Gls)
2010	North Macedonia U-17	3	(0)
2011–2014	North Macedonia	17	(0)
- ‡ National team caps and goals as of 13:44, 19 September 2021 (UTC)

Aneta Georgieva (born 15 February 1994 in Skopje) is a Macedonian footballer. She plays as a forward for the North Macedonia national team.

== International career ==
Georgieva made her debut for the North Macedonia national team on 3 March 2011, against Lithuania.
