= UEFA Women's Euro 2022 qualifying Group G =

Football tournament qualification stage

Group G of the UEFA Women's Euro 2022 qualifying competition consisted of five teams: France, Austria, Serbia, Kazakhstan, and North Macedonia. The composition of the nine groups in the qualifying group stage was decided by the draw held on 21 February 2019, 13:30 CET (UTC+1), at the UEFA headquarters in Nyon, Switzerland. with the teams seeded according to their coefficient ranking.

The group was played in home-and-away round-robin format between August 2019 and December 2020. The group winners and the three best runners-up among all nine groups (not counting results against the sixth-placed team) qualified directly for the final tournament, while the remaining six runners-up advance to the play-offs.

On 17 March 2020, all matches were put on hold due to the COVID-19 pandemic.

== Standings ==
Pos	Team	Pld	W	D	L	GF	GA	GD	Pts	Qualification	France	Austria	Serbia	North Macedonia	Kazakhstan
1	France	8	7	1	0	44	0	+44	22	Final tournament	—	3–0	6–0	11–0	12–0
2	Austria	8	6	1	1	22	3	+19	19	Final tournament	0–0	—	1–0	3–0	9–0
3	Serbia	8	4	0	4	21	12	+9	12		0–2	0–1	—	8–1	4–1
4	North Macedonia	8	2	0	6	8	39	−31	6		0–7	0–3	0–6	—	4–1
5	Kazakhstan	8	0	0	8	2	43	−41	0		0–3	0–5	0–3	0–3	—

Source: UEFA
Rules for classification: Tiebreakers

== Matches ==
Times are CET/CEST, (Note: CEST (UTC+2) for dates between 31 March and 26 October 2019 and between 29 March and 24 October 2020, and CET (UTC+1) for all other dates.) as listed by UEFA (local times, if different, are in parentheses).

1 September 2019
12:00 (16:00 ALMT)

Kazakhstan	0–3	Serbia
	Report	Mijatović 58'; Poljak 81'; Matić 84'

Kazhymukan Munaitpasov Stadium, Shymkent
Attendance: 700
Referee: Alina Peşu (Romania)

3 September 2019
18:00

Austria	3–0	North Macedonia
Feiersinger 25'; Hickelsberger 43'; Dunst 45+3'	Report

Bundesstadion Südstadt, Maria Enzersdorf
Attendance: 1,560
Referee: Alexandra Ponomareva (Russia)

2 October 2019
15:00

North Macedonia	4–1	Kazakhstan
Andonova 6', 28' (pen.); Rochi 14', 75'	Report	Myasnikova 73'

Petar Miloševski Training Centre, Skopje
Attendance: 253
Referee: Justina Lavrenovaite (Lithuania)

5 October 2019
15:00

North Macedonia	0–6	Serbia
	Report	Blagojević 4', 34'; Filipović 38'; Vuković 46', 61'; Stefanović 82'

Petar Miloševski Training Centre, Skopje
Attendance: 400
Referee: Maria Sole Caputi (Italy)

8 October 2019
17:00 (21:00 ALMT)

Kazakhstan	0–3	France
	Report	Gauvin 58'; Le Sommer 70'; Katoto 89'

Kazhymukan Munaitpasov Stadium, Shymkent
Attendance: 1,193
Referee: Laura Rapp (Sweden)
8 October 2019
18:00

Serbia	0–1	Austria
	Report	Billa 12'

Čair Stadium, Niš
Attendance: 1,000
Referee: Eleni Antoniou (Greece)

8 November 2019
18:00

North Macedonia	0–3	Austria
	Report	Billa 35' (pen.); Zadrazil 45+2'; Dunst 78'

Toše Proeski Arena, Skopje
Attendance: 249
Referee: Lucie Šulcová (Czech Republic)

9 November 2019
21:00

France	6–0	Serbia
Majri 7', 12', 63'; Geyoro 31'; Katoto 52'; Asseyi 90+3'	Report

Nouveau Stade de Bordeaux, Bordeaux
Attendance: 21,211
Referee: Marta Huerta De Aza (Spain)

12 November 2019
17:55

Austria	9–0	Kazakhstan
Hickelsberger 7', 19', 48', 90+1'; Billa 11', 57', 69'; Feiersinger 18'; Zadrazil 50'	Report

Bundesstadion Südstadt, Maria Enzersdorf
Attendance: 1,200
Referee: Hristiyana Guteva (Bulgaria)

6 March 2020
18:00

Serbia	8–1	North Macedonia
Poljak 4', 8'; Filipović 45', 53'; Damjanović 49'; Čanković 52', 90+2'; Radojičić 72'	Report	Rochi 14'

Stadion FK Kolubara, Belgrade
Attendance: 647
Referee: Shona Shukrula (Netherlands)

18 September 2020
21:00

Serbia	0–2	France
	Report	Frajtović 6' (o.g.); Majri 15'

City Stadium, Subotica
Attendance: 0
Referee: Frida Nielsen (Denmark)

22 September 2020
12:00 (16:00 ALMT)

Kazakhstan	0–5	Austria
	Report	Dunst 14', 50'; Aschauer 64'; Puntigam 68'; Billa 76' (pen.)

Namyz Stadium, Shymkent
Attendance: 0
Referee: Katalin Sipos (Hungary)
22 September 2020
21:00

North Macedonia	0–7	France
	Report	Le Sommer 15', 19' (pen.); Katoto 22', 52'; Torrent 79'; Asseyi 83' (pen.); De Almeida 90+3'

Toše Proeski Arena, Skopje
Attendance: 0
Referee: Reelika Turi (Estonia)

23 October 2020 (Note: All matches originally scheduled to be played in April and June 2020 had been postponed due to the COVID-19 pandemic in Europe. These matches were subsequently rescheduled to be played between October and December 2020.)
21:00

France	11–0	North Macedonia
Gauvin 1'; Le Sommer 5', 21', 73', 78'; De Almeida 39'; Diani 45+1'; Asseyi 55'; Geyoro 60', 63'; D. Cascarino 76'	Report

Stade de la Source, Orléans
Attendance: 612
Referee: Vera Opeykina (Russia)

24 October 2020
18:00

Serbia	4–1	Kazakhstan
Ivanović 60'; Filipović 72'; Damjanović 89'; Čavić 90+3'	Report	Kirgizbaeva 32'

Sports Center of FA of Serbia, Stara Pazova
Attendance: 0
Referee: Cristina Trandafir (Romania)

27 October 2020
21:00

Austria	0–0	France
	Report

Wiener Neustadt Arena, Wiener Neustadt
Attendance: 650
Referee: Pernilla Larsson (Sweden)

27 November 2020
12:00 (17:00 ALMT)

Kazakhstan	0–3	North Macedonia
	Report	Rochi 11', 34'; Shemsovikj 37'

Almaty Central Stadium, Almaty
Attendance: 0
Referee: Lucie Šulcová (Czech Republic)
27 November 2020
21:00

France	3–0	Austria
Renard 11'; Katoto 27', 73'	Report

Stade de Roudourou, Guingamp
Attendance: 0
Referee: Esther Staubli (Switzerland)

1 December 2020
18:30

Austria	1–0	Serbia
Billa 80'	Report

Altach Arena, Altach
Attendance: 0
Referee: Tess Olofsson (Sweden)
1 December 2020
21:00

France	12–0	Kazakhstan
De Almeida 5'; Diani 7', 17'; Katoto 12', 16'; Dali 24'; Périsset 33'; D. Cascarino 50'; Laurent 58'; Morroni 67'; Baltimore 72'; Matéo 83'	Report

Stade de la Rabine, Vannes
Attendance: 0
Referee: Lorraine Watson (Scotland)

== Goalscorers ==
There were 85 goals scored in 19 matches, for an average of 4.47 goals per match.

8 goals

- (France) Marie-Antoinette Katoto

7 goals

- (Austria) Nicole Billa
- (France) Eugénie Le Sommer

5 goals

- (Austria) Julia Hickelsberger
- (North Macedonia) Gentjana Rochi

4 goals

- (Austria) Barbara Dunst
- (France) Amel Majri
- (Serbia) Tijana Filipović

3 goals

- (France) Viviane Asseyi
- (France) Élisa De Almeida
- (France) Kadidiatou Diani
- (France) Grace Geyoro
- (Serbia) Allegra Poljak

2 goals

- (Austria) Laura Feiersinger
- (Austria) Sarah Zadrazil
- (France) Delphine Cascarino
- (France) Valérie Gauvin
- (North Macedonia) Nataša Andonova
- (Serbia) Dina Blagojević
- (Serbia) Jelena Čanković
- (Serbia) Nevena Damjanović
- (Serbia) Marija Vuković

1 goal

- (Austria) Verena Aschauer
- (Austria) Sarah Puntigam
- (France) Sandy Baltimore
- (France) Kenza Dali
- (France) Emelyne Laurent
- (France) Clara Matéo
- (France) Perle Morroni
- (France) Ève Périsset
- (France) Wendie Renard
- (France) Marion Torrent
- (Kazakhstan) Begaim Kirgizbaeva
- (Kazakhstan) Yulia Myasnikova
- (North Macedonia) Elma Shemsovikj
- (Serbia) Mina Čavić
- (Serbia) Miljana Ivanović
- (Serbia) Tijana Matić
- (Serbia) Milica Mijatović
- (Serbia) Marija Radojičić
- (Serbia) Dejana Stefanović

1 own goal

- (Serbia) Anđela Frajtović (against France)
