= ŽFK Kamenica Sasa =

Macedonian women's football club

Kamenica Sasa
- Full name: Ženski Fudbalski Klub Kamenica Sasa
- Founded: June 2017; 9 years ago
- Chairman: Zoran Zlatkovski
- Manager: Zoran Zlatkovski
- League: Macedonian Women's Football Championship
- 2024–25: Macedonian Women's Football Championship, 3rd of 15
Home colours	Away colours

Ženski Fudbalski Klub Kamenica Sasa (Macedonian: Женски Фудбалски Клуб Каменица Саса) is a women's association football club based in Makedonska Kamenica, North Macedonia. They won two Macedonian Women's Football Championship titles, in 2020 and 2021.

== History ==
Kamenica Sasa was founded in June 2017, by former footballer Zoran Zlatkovski. They won their first Macedonian Women's Football Championship title in 2019–20, and thus qualified as North Macedonia's representative team to the 2020–21 Champions League qualifying round. They lost 3–1 to NSA Sofia in the first round.

Kamenica Sasa won their second consecutive league title in 2020–21, and qualified once again to the Champions League. They played Juventus in the semi-final of the 2021–22 Champions League first qualifying round, in which they lost 12–0 and were eliminated.

== Players ==
=== Current squad ===
As of 18 August 2021

Note: Flags indicate national team as defined under FIFA eligibility rules; some limited exceptions apply. Players may hold more than one non-FIFA nationality.

No.	Pos.	Nation	Player
1	GK	MKD	Nikolija Stojanovska
4	DF	MKD	Eleonora Nikolovska
7	FW	MKD	Ana Dimitrovska
8	MF	MKD	Anastasija Marinkovska
9	MF	MKD	Veronika Nikolovska
10	MF	MKD	Dajana Ristovska
11	DF	MKD	Antoniela Stoimenovska
13	MF	MKD	Stefanija Marinkovska
14	DF	MKD	Jelena Gvozderac
15	DF	MKD	Ana Ristovska
19	DF	MKD	Pavlinka Nikolovska
22	DF	MKD	Monika Georgieva (captain)

No.	Pos.	Nation	Player
23	GK	BIH	Jelena Gvozderac
28	MF	MKD	Elena Paneska
69	DF	MKD	Hristina Joshevska
77	FW	MKD	Lenche Andreevska
88	MF	SRB	Lana Čolić
99	MF	BUL	Antonina Shopska
—	GK	MKD	Olgica Arsova
—	GK	MKD	Marinela Angelovska
—	MF	MKD	Mila Talevska
—	MF	MKD	Rabija Dervishi
—	MF	MKD	Marjana Naceva

== Honours ==
- (North Macedonia) Macedonian Women's Football Championship
  - Winners (2): 2019–20, 2020–21

== European record ==
- UEFA Women's Champions League: 0 appearances

2020–21: First qualifying round
2021–22: First qualifying round (semi-final)
