= Violeta Spirovska =

Macedonian footballer

Personal information
- Date of birth: 11 January 1981 (age 45)
- Position: Midfielder

International career^{‡}
Years	Team	Apps	(Gls)
2009–2014	Macedonia	8	(1)
- ‡ National team caps and goals as of 10:56, 21 September 2021 (UTC)

Violeta Spirovska (born 11 January 1981) is a Macedonian footballer who plays as a midfielder for the North Macedonia national team.

== International career ==
Spirovska made her debut for the North Macedonia national team on 19 September 2009, coming on as a substitute for Shireta Brahimi against Slovakia.
