= Nataša Andonova =

Macedonian footballer

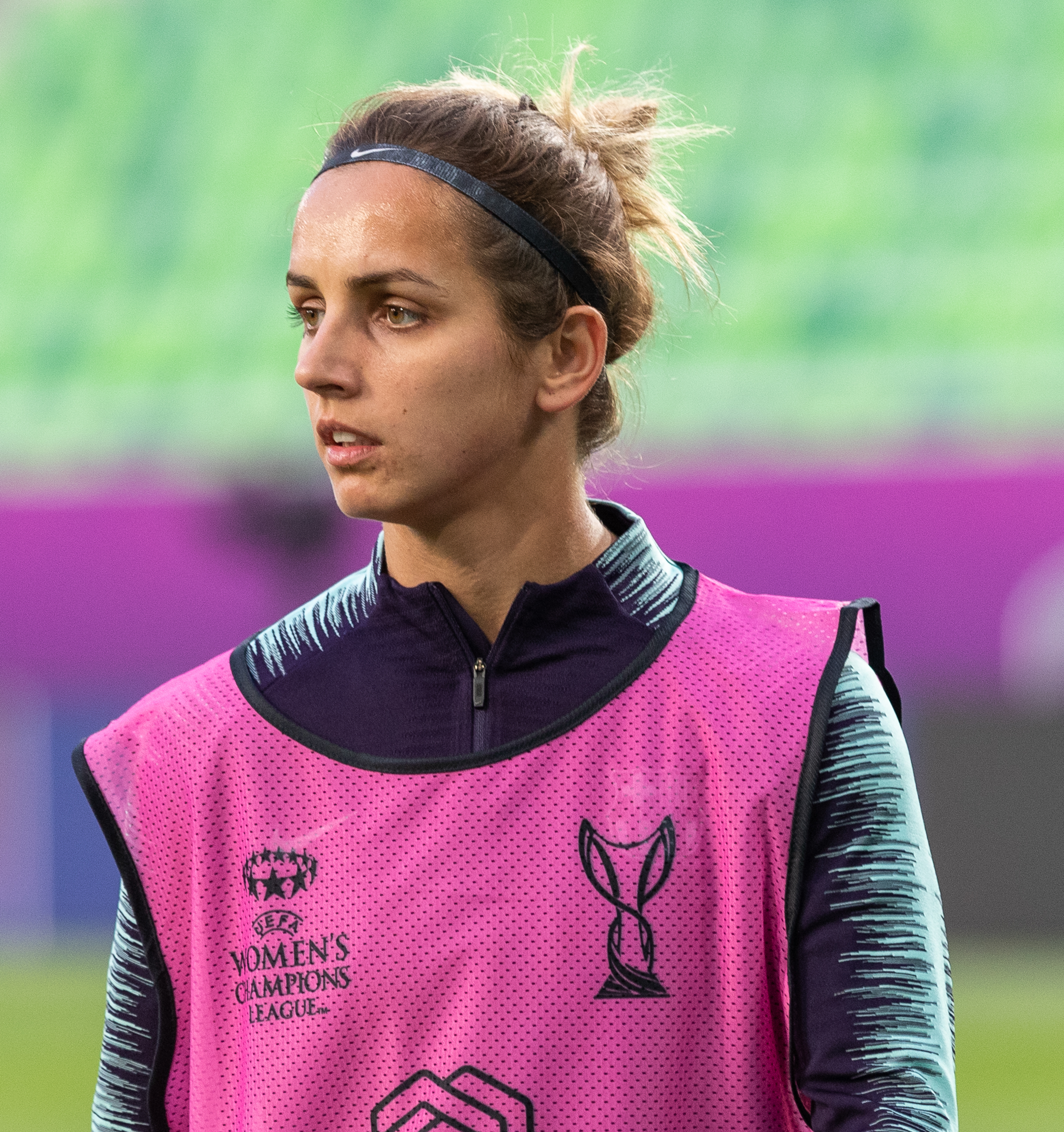
- Andonova with Barcelona in 2019

Personal information
- Date of birth: 4 December 1993 (age 32)
- Place of birth: Negotino, Macedonia
- Height: 1.69 m (5 ft 7 in)
- Position: Forward

Team information
- Current team: Madrid CFF
- Number: 9

Senior career*
Years	Team	Apps	(Gls)
2009–2010	Tikvešanka		
2010–2011	Borec Veles		
2011–2015	Turbine Potsdam	61	(12)
2011–2014	Turbine Potsdam II	12	(7)
2015–2017	Rosengård	34	(20)
2017	Paris Saint-Germain	7	(0)
2017–2019	Barcelona	23	(2)
2019–2024	Levante	122	(22)
2024	Al-Shabab	12	(6)
2024–	Madrid CFF	40	(3)

International career
2008–2009	Macedonia U17	9	(7)
2010–2011	Macedonia U19	9	(6)
2008–	North Macedonia	57	(25)
- * Club domestic league appearances and goals

Nataša Andonova (Macedonian: Наташа Андонова; born 4 December 1993) is a Macedonian professional footballer who plays as a forward for Spanish Liga F club Madrid CFF and captains the North Macedonia women's national team. She is the younger sister of Sijce Andonova, who is also a Macedonian footballer. She is the top scorer in the history of the Macedonian national team.

== Career ==
Andonova began her career at ZFK Tikvešanka in Macedonia. She first came to international attention in the 2010 Under-19 Euro, hosted by the Republic of Macedonia. Despite playing in the weakest team in the competition Andonova was named the tournament's best player. By then she had already represented the senior Macedonia national team.

In the summer of 2010 Andonova was transferred to ZFK Borec, playing the preliminary stage of the 2010–11 Champions League, and in the winter market she signed for Turbine Potsdam, the reigning European champions, along with her sister Sijce. She was promoted to the first team in February and played her first Bundesliga match that same month. She scored her first goal for Turbine in the semi-finals of the DFB-Pokal against Bayern Munich. Andonova was the second top scorer of the 2011 Bundesliga Cup with 7 goals.

In May 201,5 Andonova left Turbine for Swedish Damallsvenskan champions FC Rosengård, who were in the market for a forward after the departure of Anja Mittag to Paris Saint-Germain.

On 31 January 2017, Paris Saint-Germain announced that an agreement with Andonova was reached for a permanent deal until the end of the season in June 2017. In PSG, Andonova wore the number 15.

The player did not renew her contract with PSG and joined Barcelona in June 2017. Andonova wore the number 21 with Barcelona. After two seasons with the Catalan club, Andonova departed from Barcelona and moved to fellow Spanish club Levante UD.

She soon became an important player for Levante's squad and signed a two-year extension with the club in 2022. After playing in 122 games and scoring 22 goals for Levante, Andonova transferred to Al-Shabab FC and became the first Macedonian player to participate in the Saudi Women's League.

== International goals ==
Scores and results list North Macedonia's goal tally first.

No.	Date	Venue	Opponent	Score	Result	Competition
1.	23 June 2010	Goce Delčev Stadium, Prilep, North Macedonia	Slovakia	1–6	1–6	2011 FIFA Women's World Cup qualification
2.	3 March 2011	Stadion Mladost, Strumica, North Macedonia	Lithuania	1–0	1–0	UEFA Women's Euro 2013 qualifying preliminary round
3.	6 March 2011	Stadion Mladost, Strumica, North Macedonia	Luxembourg	1–0	5–1	UEFA Women's Euro 2013 qualifying preliminary round
4.	6 March 2011	Stadion Mladost, Strumica, North Macedonia	Luxembourg	4–0	5–1	UEFA Women's Euro 2013 qualifying preliminary round
5.	26 October 2011	Stadion Goce Delčev, Prilep, North Macedonia	Greece	1–1	1–1	UEFA Women's Euro 2013 qualifying
6.	20 September 2013	Stadion Mladost, Strumica, North Macedonia	Romania	1–4	1–9	2015 FIFA Women's World Cup qualification
7.	15 June 2014	Haapsalu linnastaadion, Haapsalu, Estonia	Estonia	1–1	1–1	2015 FIFA Women's World Cup qualification
8.	18 June 2014	FK Viktoria Stadion, Prague, Czech Republic	Czech Republic	1–2	2–5	2015 FIFA Women's World Cup qualification
9.	18 June 2014	FK Viktoria Stadion, Prague, Czech Republic	Czech Republic	2–3	2–5	2015 FIFA Women's World Cup qualification
10.	2 October 2019	Petar Miloševski Training Centre, Skopje, North Macedonia	Kazakhstan	1–0	4–1	UEFA Women's Euro 2022 qualifying
11.	2 October 2019	Petar Miloševski Training Centre, Skopje, North Macedonia	Kazakhstan	3–0	4–1	UEFA Women's Euro 2022 qualifying
12.	21 October 2021	Daugava Stadium, Riga, Latvia	Latvia	2–0	4–1	2023 FIFA Women's World Cup qualification
13.	21 October 2021	Daugava Stadium, Riga, Latvia	Latvia	4–1	4–1	2023 FIFA Women's World Cup qualification
14.	1 September 2022	Petar Miloševski Training Centre, Skopje, North Macedonia	Latvia	1–1	3–2	2023 FIFA Women's World Cup qualification
15.	1 September 2022	Petar Miloševski Training Centre, Skopje, North Macedonia	Latvia	2–1	3–2	2023 FIFA Women's World Cup qualification
16.	21 February 2023	Gold City Sport Complex, Alanya, Turkey	Estonia	1–1	1–1	2023 Turkish Women's Cup
17.	7 April 2023	Elbasan Arena, Elbasan, Albania	Albania	1–0	1–3	Friendly
18.	5 April 2024	LNK Sporta Parks, Riga, Latvia	Latvia	3–1	4–3	UEFA Women's Euro 2025 qualifying
19.	4 June 2024	Zimbru Stadium, Chișinău, Moldova	Moldova	2–1	4–2	UEFA Women's Euro 2025 qualifying
20.	4 June 2024	Zimbru Stadium, Chișinău, Moldova	Moldova	4–2	4–2	UEFA Women's Euro 2025 qualifying
21.	12 July 2024	Petar Miloševski Training Centre, Skopje, North Macedonia	Latvia	1–1	1–2	UEFA Women's Euro 2025 qualifying
