= ŽFK Biljanini Izvori =

ЖФК Билјанини Извори ŽFK Biljanini Izvori
- Full name: Ženski fudbalski klub Biljanini Izvori
- Founded: 2010
- Ground: SRC Biljanini Izvori
- Capacity: 3,000
- Chairman: Jovče Popovski
- Manager: Naum Jankulovski
- League: Premier league
- 2012-13: 1st (champions)
Home colours	Away colours

ŽFK Biljanini Izvori (Macedonian: Женски фудбалски клуб Билјанини Извори, meaning Biljanini springs) is a women's football club from Ohrid, North Macedonia. Founded in 2010, the team started directly in the Macedonian women's football championship. The team won its first championship in 2012–13 and played in the 2013–14 UEFA Women's Champions League qualifying round losing all three matches.

== History ==
The club was renamed from Ohrigjanki to Biljanini Izvori in 2010. After two-time Macedonian champion ŽFK Naše Taksi dissolved in 2012, many of its players moved to Biljanini Izvori.

The championship was won in 2012/13. The very next season, 2013/14 Biljanini finished bottom of the table.

== Titles ==
- (North Macedonia) Macedonian Women's Football Championship:
  - Winners (1): 2012–13

== UEFA Competitions Record ==
The 2013–14 season will be the first in UEFA competitions for the team.

Competition	Round	Country	Club	Result
2013–14 UEFA Women's Champions League	Qualifying round	(Finland)	PK-35	1–13
2013–14 UEFA Women's Champions League	Qualifying round	(Greece)	PAOK	0–5
2013–14 UEFA Women's Champions League	Qualifying round	(Estonia)	Pärnu	1-3
