= Macedonian Women's Football Cup =

- Founded: 2003
- Region: North Macedonia
- Current champions: ŽFK Istatov (1st title)

The Macedonian Women's Football Cup is the annual cup competition of women's football teams in North Macedonia.

== List of finals ==
The list of finals:

Season	Champion	Result	Runner-up
2003			
2004	ŽFK Škiponjat	2–0	Pobeda (Prilep)
2005			
2006	ŽFK Škiponjat		
2007			
2008			
2009	ŽFK Tikvešanka	6–1	Pobeda
2010	ŽFK Borec	2–0	Pobeda
2011	ŽFK Naše Taksi	2–1	Pobeda
2012	ŽFK Naše Taksi	5–0	Pobeda
2013	ŽFK Edinstvo	2–1 (a.e.t.)	Idnina-S
2014	ŽFK Kočani	5–2	ŽFK Konzuli
2015	ŽFK Kočani	3–2	ŽFK Dragon 2014
2016	ŽFK Dragon 2014	4–0	ZFK Top Goal
2017	ŽFK Istatov	4–2	ŽFK Tiverija
2018	ŽFK Tiverija	5–0	ŽFK Dragon 2014

== By titles ==
Only known titles.

Team	Titles
ŽFK Škiponjat	2
ŽFK Naše Taksi	2
ŽFK Kočani	2
ŽFK Tikvešanka	1
ŽFK Borec	1
ŽFK Edinstvo	1
ŽFK Dragon 2014	1
ŽFK Istatov	1
ŽFK Tiverija	1
