= ŽFK Skopje 2014 =

ЖФК Скопје 2014 ŽFK Skopje 2014
- Founded: 2014
- Ground: Jovan Mandarovski
- League: 1. MWFL
- 2025-26: Champions
Home colours	Away colours

ŽFK Skopje 2014 (Macedonian: ЖФК Скопје 2014) is a women's football club from Skopje, North Macedonia. The team was founded in 2014 and won the national championship in 2014–15 with 18 wins from 18 games. In the next seasons they have won 3 more titles and also achieved a national cup win.

== History ==
The club was founded as Dragon in 2014.

In 2015 they lost the cup final. In 2016 they won the cup final. Before the 2020/21 season, the club renamed to Skopje 2014.

== Titles ==
- (North Macedonia) Macedonian Women's Football Championship:
  - Winners (5): 2014–15, 2015–16, 2017–18, 2018–19, 2025–2026
- (North Macedonia) Macedonian Women's Cup:
  - Winners (1): 2016
  - Runners-up (2): 2015, 2018

== Current squad ==
As of July 2022

Goalkeepers	Defenders	Midfielders	Forwards
1. (North Macedonia) Labina Janevska; 91. (North Macedonia) Martina Angjelkovska	9. (North Macedonia) Pavlina Nikolovska; 10. (North Macedonia) Dragana Kostova; 16. (North Macedonia) Egzona Jashari; 23. (North Macedonia) Teodora Gjorgjevska	5. (North Macedonia) Sara Petkovska; 6. (North Macedonia) Elma Shemsovikj; 13. (North Macedonia) Nadica Kosteska; 14. (North Macedonia) Jana Ackovska; 19. (North Macedonia) Marija Belistojanoska; 21. (North Macedonia) Elena Petrovska; 48. (North Macedonia) Sara Kolarovska	7. (North Macedonia) Dragana Gegova; 11. (North Macedonia) Stefani Petrevska; 20. (North Macedonia) Afrodita Salihi; 77. (North Macedonia) Katerina Milevska

== UEFA Competitions Record ==
The team debuted in the 2015–16 season but finished last in their qualifying group. In the next three seasons Dragon finished with 3 losses out of three games as well. In fact only one goal was scored so far, when Stankica Atanasova scored in a 1–14 defeat to Osijek in 2016–17.
