= ŽFK Kočani =

ЖФК Кочани ŽFK Kočani
- Full name: Ženski fudbalski klub Kočani
- Founded: 2006
- Ground: Stadion "Nikola Mantov"
- Capacity: <5000
- Chairman: Oliver Jovanovski
- League: Macedonian women's second league
Home colours	Away colours

ŽFK Kočani (Macedonian: Женски фудбалски клуб Кочани) is a women's football club from Kočani, North Macedonia. The team was founded in 2006 and won the national championship in 2013–14.

== History ==
The club was founded in 2006. In 2014 it reached the cup final for the first time which they then won 5–2 over ŽFK Konsuli.

In 2013–14 the club won the national league.

As of today 14.05.2026 they are sitting in the 9th place (10pts) in the 1ZFL with 3 won, 1 drawn and 20 lost matches. They have scored 19 goals and conceded 122.

== Titles ==
- (North Macedonia) Macedonian Women's Football Championship:
  - Winners (1): 2013–14
- (North Macedonia) Macedonian Women's Cup:
  - Winners (2): 2014, 2015

== UEFA Competitions Record ==
The 2014–15 season was the first in UEFA competitions for the team. All games were lost.

Competition	Round	Club	Result
2014–15 UEFA Women's Champions League	Qualifying round	(Finland) Åland United	0–4
2014–15 UEFA Women's Champions League	Qualifying round	(Bosnia and Herzegovina) SFK 2000	0–7
2014–15 UEFA Women's Champions League	Qualifying round	(Poland) Medyk Konin	1–11
