= Macedonian Women's Football Championship =

- Country: North Macedonia
- Confederation: UEFA
- Divisions: 1
- Number of clubs: 10
- Level on pyramid: 1
- Relegation to: 2WFL
- Domestic cup: Macedonian Women's Football Cup
- International cup: UEFA Champions League
- Current champions: ŽFK Skopje 2014 (Skopje) (5th title) (2026-2027)
- Most championships: ŽFK Škiponjat and ŽFK Skopje 2014 (5 titles)
- Website: Official
- Current: 2026-27

The Macedonian Women's League (Macedonian: 1. лига - Жени, romanized: 1. liga - Ženi, lit. 'first league for women') is a women's football league of North Macedonia.

The winning team of the league qualifies for a spot in the UEFA Women's Champions League. Last year ŽFK Skopje 2014 entered the UEFA Women's Champions League Qualifications and unfortunately lost the 2 matches they played:

- Althone Town 0:4 (semi-final)
- WFC Nike Lusso 0:2 (third place)

== 2026-27 clubs ==
- KFF AS United (Struga)
- ŽFK Pelister (Bitola)
- ŽFK Skopje 2014 (Skopje)
- ŽFK Istatov (Skopje)
- ŽFK Vardar (Skopje)
- ŽFK Kamenica Sasa (Makedonska Kamenica)
- ŽFK Ljuboten (Tetovo)
- ŽFK Rečica (Kumanovo)
- ŽFK Brera Tiverija (Strumica)
- ŽFK Kočani (Kocani)

== 2024-25 clubs ==
- KFF AS United (Struga)
- ŽFK Atletiko (Bitola)
- ŽFK Skopje 2014 (Skopje)
- ŽFK Istatov (Skopje)
- ŽFK Kamenica Sasa (Makedonska Kamenica)
- ŽFK Ljuboten (Tetovo)
- ŽFK Rečica (Kumanovo)
- ŽFK Brera Tiverija (Strumica)
- ŽFK Top Gol (Bitola)

Before the start of the season, KFF Shkëndija from Tetovo withdrew.

== Champions ==
The list of past champions:

- 2002–03: Lombardini
- 2003–04: Škiponjat
- 2004–05: Škiponjat
- 2005–06: Škiponjat
- 2006–07: Škiponjat
- 2007–08: Škiponjat
- 2008–09: Tikvešanka
- 2009–10: Borec
- 2010–11: Naše Taksi
- 2011–12: Naše Taksi
- 2012–13: Biljanini Izvori
- 2013–14: Kočani
- 2014–15: Dragon
- 2015–16: Dragon
- 2016–17: Istatov
- 2017–18: Dragon
- 2018–19: Dragon
- 2019–20: Kamenica Sasa
- 2020–21: Kamenica Sasa
- 2021–22: Ljuboten
- 2022–23: Ljuboten
- 2023–24: Ljuboten
- 2024–25: Ljuboten
- 2025–26: ŽFK Skopje 2014

== By titles ==
Team	Titles
Škiponjat	5
ŽFK Dragon 2014	5
Ljuboten	4
Naše Taksi	2
Kamenica Sasa	2
Lombardini	1
Tikvešanka	1
Borec	1
Biljanini Izvori	1
Kočani	1
ŽFK Skopje 2014	1
Istatov	1
