= North Macedonia women's national football team =

North Macedonia
- Nickname(s): Црвени лавици The Red Lionesses; Црвено-Жолти; Red-Yellows
- Association: Football Federation of Macedonia
- Confederation: UEFA (Europe)
- Head coach: Aleksandar Andov
- Captain: Nataša Andonova
- Most caps: Violeta Spirovska (72)
- Top scorer: Gentjana Rochi (22)
- Home stadium: Stadium Petar Miloševski, Bitola
- FIFA code: MKD
First colours	Second colours

FIFA ranking
- Current: 138 ▼2 (20 October 2026)
- Highest: 90 (December 2009)
- Lowest: 138 (June 2025)

First international
- Croatia 4–0 Macedonia (Đakovo, Croatia; 7 May 2005)

Biggest win
- Macedonia 5–1 Luxembourg (Strumica, Macedonia; 5 March 2011)

Biggest defeat
- Italy 15–0 Macedonia (Vercelli, Italy, 17 September 2014)

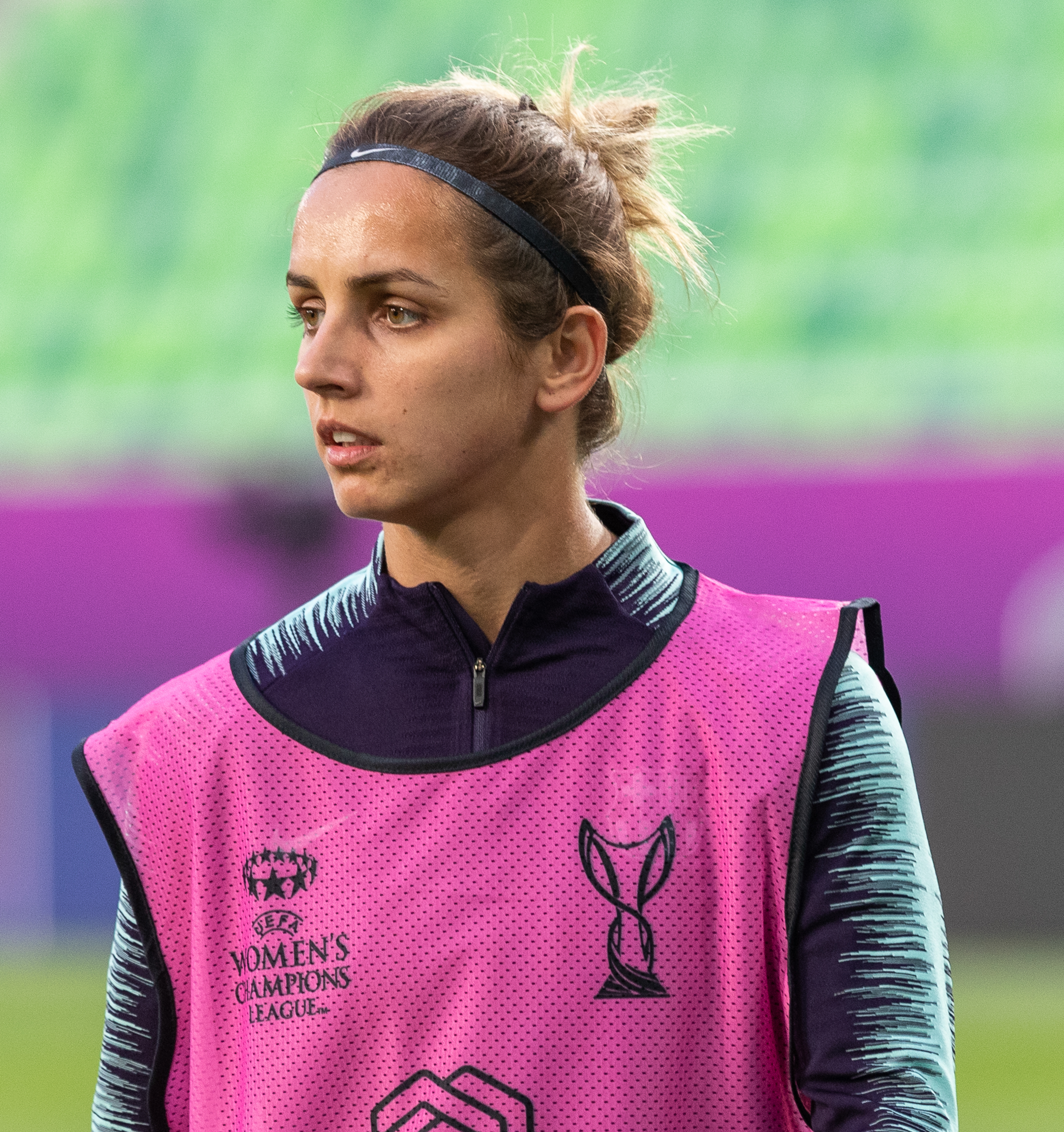
Captain of the national team Nataša Andonova

The North Macedonia women's national football team represents North Macedonia in international women's football. The team is controlled by the Football Federation of Macedonia, the governing body for football in the country.

== History ==
They are currently coached by Kiril Izov. The North Macedonia women's team find themselves ranked 129th out of 159 active women's footballing nations registered with FIFA.

The women's team played their first official game on 7 May 2005, in which they were beaten 4–0 by Croatia. Two weeks later, on 21 May 2005, Macedonia scored their first ever goal in a 7–1 loss to Slovenia.

== Team image ==
=== Nicknames ===
The North Macedonia women's national football team has been known or nicknamed as the "Црвени Лавици (The Red Lionesses)" or "Црвено-Жолти (Red-Yellows)".

=== Home stadium ===
The North Macedonia plays their home matches on the Toše Proeski Arena in Skopje, but they also use Petar Miloševski Training Centre as an alternative stadium. In the past, they also played some of the matches on Gradski Stadium in Kumanovo, Goce Delčev Stadium in Prilep and stadiums Blagoj Istatov and Kukuš in Strumica.

== Results and fixtures ==
The following is a list of match results in the last 12 months, as well as any future matches that have been scheduled.

Legend

Win Draw Lose Fixture

=== 2026 ===
3 March 2027 FIFA Women's World Cup qualification	Azerbaijan	2–0	North Macedonia	Baku, Azerbaijan
12:00 (15:00 UTC+4)	Jafarzade 28', 78'	Report		Stadium: Dalga Arena; Attendance: 325; Referee: Anna Adamska (Poland)

7 March 2027 FIFA Women's World Cup qualification	North Macedonia	3–0	Andorra	Bitola, North Macedonia
15:00	Galabovska 17'; Meijer 20'; Grozdanova 83'	Report		Stadium: Petar Miloševski Stadium; Attendance: 650; Referee: Charlotte Carpenter (Wales)

14 April 2027 FIFA Women's World Cup qualification	North Macedonia	0–5	Hungary	Bitola, North Macedonia
16:00		Report	Csányi 2', 9', 20'; Savanya 45+1'; Csiki 88'	Stadium: Petar Miloševski Stadium; Attendance: 200; Referee: Davina Lutz (Germany)

18 April 2027 FIFA Women's World Cup qualification	Hungary	7–0	North Macedonia	Felcsút, Hungary
15:00	Mayer 21', 51'; Paneva 35' (o.g.); Pápai 47'; Kaján 68'; Va. Nagy 85'; Savanya 90+3' (pen.)	Report		Stadium: Pancho Aréna; Attendance: 353; Referee: Paola Cebollada López (Spain)

5 June 2027 FIFA Women's World Cup qualification	Andorra	0–1	North Macedonia	Andorra
19:30		Report	Nikolovska 86'	Stadium: Estadi Nacional, Andorra la Vella; Attendance: 347; Referee: Ana Afo (Portugal)

9 June 2027 FIFA Women's World Cup qualification	North Macedonia	1–3	Azerbaijan	North Macedonia
19:00	Mustafa 11'	Report	Bakarandze 8'; Mollayeva 28'; Mirzaliyeva 37'	Stadium: Petar Miloševski Stadium, Bitola; Referee: Teona Sturua (Georgia)

== Coaching staff ==
=== Current coaching staff ===
As of April 2024

Position	Name	Ref.
Head coach	Aleksandar Andov	

=== Manager history ===
- Dobre Dimovski (?–2012)
- Toshe Nacev and Blagoja Filipovski (interim) (2012)
- Gorazd Mihajlov (2012–2013)
- Dobre Dimovski (2013–2014)
- Vančo Balevski (2014–2016)
- Kiril Izov (2016–2024)
- Aleksandar Andov (2024-)

== Players ==
=== Current squad ===
- The following players were named for the friendly matches against Russia on 24 and 27 October 2025.
- Caps and goals updated after the match against Kazakhstan on 27 November 2020.

No.	Pos.	Player	Date of birth (age)	Caps	Goals	Club
	GK	Kristina Pavlovska	5 October 2005 (age 21)			(Football Association of Serbia) Mašinca
	GK	Viktorija Panchurova	25 December 1999 (age 26)	10	0	(Football Federation of Macedonia) Tiverija Brera
	DF	Slagjana Gjorgjieva	28 November 2005 (age 20)			(Football Federation of Macedonia) Tiverija Brera
	DF	Ane Boshevska	{{{age}}}			(Football Federation of Macedonia) Tiverija Brera
	DF	Pavlinka Nikolovska	4 March 1998 (age 28)			(Football Federation of Macedonia) Tiverija Brera
	DF	Iva Jovanovska				(Football Federation of Macedonia) Ljuboten
	DF	Katerina Petkova				(Football Federation of Macedonia) Istatov
	DF	Elena Paneska	10 July 2002 (age 24)			(Football Association of Slovenia) Mura
	DF	Bojana Petkova				(Polish Football Association) Polonia
	DF	Hristina Joshevska				(Football Federation of Macedonia) Skopje
	MF	Danche Karpuzovska				(Football Federation of Macedonia) Tiverija Brera
	MF	Rabija Dervishi				(Football Federation of Macedonia) Skopje
	MF	Hava Mustafa	20 September 1997 (age 29)	7	0	(Football Federation of Macedonia) Ljuboten
	MF	Aleksandra Markovska	4 May 1997 (age 29)	10	0	(Football Federation of Macedonia) Ljuboten
	MF	Simona Meyer				(Israel Football Association) Maccabi Hadera
	MF	Andrea Doneva				(Football Federation of Macedonia) Kochani
	MF	Eva Velichkova				(Football Federation of Macedonia) Ljuboten
	MF	Biljana Paneska				(Hellenic Football Federation) Agia Paraskevi
	FW	Ulza Maksuti	8 July 1999 (age 27)	7	0	(Albanian Football Federation) Gramshi
	FW	Kristina Petrushevska				(Football Federation of Macedonia) Istatov
	FW	Melania Grozdanovska				(Football Federation of Macedonia) Istatov
	FW	Jovana Pavlovska	11 September 2006 (age 20)			(Football Federation of Macedonia) AS United
	FW	Mia Golavska				(Football Federation of Macedonia) SC Istatov

=== Recent call ups ===
- The following players have been called up to the North Macedonia squad in the past 12 months.

Pos.	Player	Date of birth (age)	Caps	Goals	Club	Latest call-up

== Records ==
- Active players in **bold**, statistics correct as of 2020.

=== Most capped players ===
#	Player	Year(s)	Caps
**1**	Violeta Spirovska	?	72

=== Top goalscorers ===
#	Player	Year(s)	Goals	Caps
**1**	**Gentjana Rochi**	2011–present	22	54
**2**	**Nataša Andonova**	2008-	14	33

=== Scorers by year ===
FIFA World Cup, including qualifiers
Players	Overall	2011	2015
Nataša Andonova	**5**	1	4
Gentjana Rochi	**1**		1
Afrodita Salihi	**2**	1	1
Violeta Spirovska	**1**	1	

UEFA Euro, qualifiers included
Scorers	Overall	2009	2013	2017	2022
Nataša Andonova	6		4		2
Shireta Brahimi	1		1		
Eli Jakovska	2			2	
Simona Krstanovska	1			1	
Gentjana Rochi	8		2	1	5
Afrodita Salihi	2		2		
Elma Shemsovikj	1				1

== Competitive record ==
=== FIFA Women's World Cup ===
FIFA Women's World Cup record
Edition	Finals record								Qualification record						
Edition	Result	Pos.	Pld.	W	D*	L	GF	GA	Result	Pld.	W	D	L	GF	GA
(China) 1991	Didn't have a team								Didn't have a team						
(Sweden) 1995	Didn't have a team								Didn't have a team						
(United States) 1999	Didn't have a team								Didn't have a team						
(United States) 2003	Didn't have a team								Didn't have a team						
(China) 2007	Didn't have a team								Didn't have a team						
(Germany) 2011	Did not qualify								Main stage	8	0	0	8	3	68
(Canada) 2015	Did not qualify								Main stage	10	0	1	9	6	74
(France) 2019	Did not enter								Declined participation						
(Australia) (New Zealand) 2023	Did not qualify								Main Stage	10	2	0	8	10	62
(Brazil) 2027	To be determined								To be determined						
(Costa Rica) (Jamaica) (Mexico) (United States) 2031	To be determined								To be determined						
(United Kingdom) 2035	To be determined								To be determined						
Total	0 / 3	—							—	28	2	1	25	19	204

*Draws include knockout matches decided on penalty kicks.

=== Olympic Games ===
Summer Olympics record
Year	Round	Position	Pld	W	D*	L	GF	GA
(Australia) 2000	Didn't have a team							
(Greece) 2004	Didn't have a team							
(China) 2008	Didn't have a team							
(United Kingdom) 2012	Did not qualify							
(Brazil) 2016	Did not qualify							
(Japan) 2020	Did not enter							
(France) 2024	Did not enter							
(United States) 2028	To be determined							
(Australia) 2032	To be determined							
Total	0/2	—	–	–	–	–	–	–

=== UEFA Women's Championship ===
UEFA Women's Euro record
Edition	Finals record								Qualification record								
Edition	Result	Pos.	Pld.	W	D*	L	GF	GA	Result	Pld.	W	D	L	GF	GA	P/R	Rnk
(Denmark) 1991	Didn't have a team								Didn't have a team								
(Italy) 1993	Didn't have a team								Didn't have a team								
(Germany) 1995	Didn't have a team								Didn't have a team								
(Norway) (Sweden) 1997	Didn't have a team								Didn't have a team								
(Germany) 2001	Didn't have a team								Didn't have a team								
(England) 2005	Didn't have a team								Didn't have a team								
(Finland) 2009	Did not qualify								Prel. stage	3	0	0	3	0	14	–	
(Sweden) 2013	Did not qualify								Main stage	13	2	3	8	12	51	–	
(Netherlands) 2017	Did not qualify								Main stage	8	0	0	8	4	51	–	
(England) 2022	Did not qualify								Main stage	8	2	0	6	8	39	–	
(Switzerland) 2025	Did not qualify								League stage	6	2	1	3	10	17	(Note: From Euro 2025 onwards a new qualifying format was introduced, linked to the Women's Nations League where teams are divided into leagues with promotion/relegation between the leagues at the end of each cycle.)	45th
2029	To be determined								To be determined								
Total	0/5	—							—	38	6	4	28	34	172	45th	

*Draws include knockout matches decided on penalty kicks.

=== UEFA Women's Nations League ===
UEFA Women's Nations League record
Year	League	Group	Pos	Pld	W	D	L	GF	GA	P/R	Rnk
2023–24	C	5	3rd	4	0	1	3	3	8	Same position	45th
2025	C	6	3rd	4	0	1	3	2	10	Same position	49th
Total				8	0	2	6	5	18	45th	

▲	Promoted at end of season
Same position	No movement at end of season
▼	Relegated at end of season
*	Participated in promotion/relegation play-offs
