= 2022 Algarve Cup squads =

Lists of the squads for the 2022 Algarve Cup

This article lists the squads for the 2022 Algarve Cup, the 28th edition of the Algarve Cup. The cup consisted of a series of friendly games, and was held in the Algarve region of Portugal from 16 to 23 February 2022. The five national teams involved in the tournament registered a squad of 23 players.

The age listed for each player is as of 16 February 2022, the first day of the tournament. The numbers of caps and goals listed for each player do not include any matches played after the start of tournament. The club listed is the club for which the player last played a competitive match prior to the tournament. The nationality for each club reflects the national association (not the league) to which the club is affiliated. A flag is included for coaches that are of a different nationality than their own national team.

== Squads ==
=== Denmark ===
Coach: Lars Søndergaard

The 23-player squad was announced on 7 February 2022. On 11 February 2022, Rikke Sevecke withdrew due to injury and was replaced by Isabella Bryld Obaze.

No.	Pos.	Player	Date of birth (age)	Caps	Goals	Club
1	GK	Lene Christensen	4 February 2000 (aged 22)			(Denmark) KoldingQ
2	MF	Sara Thrige	15 May 1996 (aged 25)			(Italy) AC Milan
3	DF	Stine Ballisager Pedersen	3 January 1994 (aged 28)			(Norway) Vålerenga
4	DF	Isabella Bryld Obaze	30 October 2002 (aged 19)			(Denmark) HB Køge
5	DF	Simone Boye Sørensen	3 March 1993 (aged 28)			(England) Arsenal
6	MF	Olivia Holdt	7 June 2001 (aged 20)			(Denmark) Fortuna Hjørring
7	MF	Sanne Troelsgaard Nielsen	15 August 1988 (aged 33)			(England) Reading
8	MF	Emma Snerle	23 March 2001 (aged 20)			(England) West Ham United
9	FW	Caroline Møller	19 December 1998 (aged 23)			(Spain) Real Madrid
10	FW	Pernille Harder	15 November 1992 (aged 29)			(England) Chelsea
11	MF	Katrine Veje	19 June 1991 (aged 30)			(Sweden) Rosengård
12	FW	Stine Larsen	24 January 1996 (aged 26)			(Sweden) Häcken
14	DF	Matilde Lundorf Skovsen	19 January 1999 (aged 23)			(Italy) Juventus
15	FW	Kathrine Møller Kühl	5 July 2003 (aged 18)			(Denmark) Nordsjælland
17	FW	Rikke Madsen	9 August 1997 (aged 24)			(Norway) Vålerenga
18	DF	Luna Gevitz	3 March 1994 (aged 27)			(Sweden) Häcken
19	MF	Janni Thomsen	16 February 2000 (aged 22)			(Norway) Vålerenga
20	FW	Signe Bruun	6 April 1998 (aged 23)			(England) Manchester United
21	MF	Mille Gejl	23 September 1999 (aged 22)			(Sweden) Häcken
22	GK	Kathrine Larsen	5 May 1993 (aged 28)			(Norway) Klepp
23	DF	Sofie Svava	11 August 2000 (aged 21)			(Spain) Real Madrid
24	MF	Sarah Thygesen	5 November 2003 (aged 18)			(Denmark) KoldingQ
	MF	Sofie Junge Pedersen	24 April 1992 (aged 29)			(Italy) Juventus

=== Italy ===
Coach: Milena Bertolini

The 25-player squad was announced on 9 February 2022.

No.	Pos.	Player	Date of birth (age)	Caps	Goals	Club
1	GK	Laura Giuliani	5 June 1993 (aged 28)			(Italy) AC Milan
2	DF	Valentina Bergamaschi	22 January 1997 (aged 25)			(Italy) AC Milan
3	DF	Sara Gama	27 March 1989 (aged 32)			(Italy) Juventus
4	MF	Aurora Galli	13 December 1996 (aged 25)			(England) Everton
5	DF	Elena Linari	15 April 1994 (aged 27)			(Italy) Roma
6	MF	Manuela Giugliano	18 August 1997 (aged 24)			(Italy) Roma
7	DF	Alia Guagni	1 October 1987 (aged 34)			(Italy) AC Milan
8	MF	Martina Rosucci	9 May 1992 (aged 29)			(Italy) Juventus
9	FW	Valentina Giacinti	2 January 1994 (aged 28)			(Italy) Fiorentina
10	FW	Cristiana Girelli	23 April 1990 (aged 31)			(Italy) Juventus
11	FW	Barbara Bonansea	13 June 1991 (aged 30)			(Italy) Juventus
12	GK	Francesca Durante	12 February 1997 (aged 25)			(Italy) Inter Milan
13	DF	Lucia Di Guglielmo	26 June 1997 (aged 24)			(Italy) Roma
14	MF	Flaminia Simonetti	17 February 1997 (aged 24)			(Italy) Inter Milan
15	FW	Annamaria Serturini	13 May 1998 (aged 23)			(Italy) Roma
16	DF	Giulia Rizzon	24 September 1993 (aged 28)			(Italy) Como
17	DF	Lisa Boattin	3 May 1997 (aged 24)			(Italy) Juventus
18	MF	Arianna Caruso	6 November 1999 (aged 22)			(Italy) Juventus
19	DF	Martina Lenzini	23 July 1998 (aged 23)			(Italy) Juventus
20	DF	Angelica Soffia	2 July 2000 (aged 21)			(Italy) Roma
21	MF	Valentina Cernoia	22 June 1991 (aged 30)			(Italy) Juventus
22	GK	Rachele Baldi	2 October 1994 (aged 27)			(Italy) Napoli
23	DF	Benedetta Orsi	25 February 2000 (aged 21)			(Italy) Sassuolo
24	FW	Sofia Cantore	30 September 1999 (aged 22)			(Italy) Sassuolo
25	FW	Martina Piemonte	7 November 1997 (aged 24)			(Italy) AC Milan

=== Norway ===
Coach: (Sweden) Martin Sjögren

The 24-player squad was announced on 8 February 2022. A week later, it was announced that Caroline Graham Hansen had not travelled with the squad due to an ankle sprain, and a few days after that she withdrew from the squad.

No.	Pos.	Player	Date of birth (age)	Caps	Goals	Club
1	GK	Cecilie Fiskerstrand	20 March 1996 (aged 25)	40	0	(Norway) LSK Kvinner
2	DF	Anja Sønstevold	21 June 1992 (aged 29)	18	1	(Italy) Inter Milan
3	DF	Maria Thorisdottir	5 June 1993 (aged 28)	54	3	(England) Manchester United
4	MF	Synne Skinnes Hansen	12 August 1995 (aged 26)	22	0	(Norway) Rosenborg
5	MF	Julie Blakstad	27 August 2001 (aged 20)	11	2	(England) Manchester City
6	DF	Tuva Hansen	4 August 1997 (aged 24)	12	0	(Norway) Sandviken
7	MF	Ingrid Syrstad Engen	29 April 1998 (aged 23)	41	6	(Spain) Barcelona
8	MF	Vilde Bøe Risa	13 July 1995 (aged 26)	43	2	(England) Manchester United
9	MF	Vilde Hasund	27 June 1997 (aged 24)	2	1	(Sweden) Hammarby
11	FW	Celin Bizet Ildhusøy	24 October 2001 (aged 20)	1	1	(France) Paris Saint-Germain
12	GK	Aurora Mikalsen	21 March 1996 (aged 25)	0	0	(Norway) Sandviken
13	DF	Guro Bergsvand	3 March 1994 (aged 27)	6	3	(Norway) Sandviken
14	MF	Lisa Naalsund	11 June 1995 (aged 26)	3	0	(Norway) Sandviken
15	FW	Amalie Eikeland	26 August 1995 (aged 26)	26	3	(England) Reading
16	MF	Guro Reiten	26 July 1994 (aged 27)	60	14	(England) Chelsea
17	FW	Elise Thorsnes	14 August 1988 (aged 33)	128	21	(Norway) Vålerenga
18	MF	Frida Maanum	16 July 1999 (aged 22)	44	6	(England) Arsenal
19	MF	Elisabeth Terland	28 June 2001 (aged 20)	10	5	(Norway) Sandviken
20	FW	Emilie Haavi	16 June 1992 (aged 29)	90	16	(Italy) Roma
21	MF	Karina Sævik	24 March 1996 (aged 25)	27	4	(Norway) Avaldsnes
22	DF	Emilie Bragstad	16 December 2001 (aged 20)	1	0	(Norway) Rosenborg
23	GK	Sunniva Skoglund	22 May 2002 (aged 19)	0	0	(Norway) Stabæk
24	FW	Johanne Fridlund	24 July 1996 (aged 25)	0	0	(Italy) Lazio

=== Portugal ===
Coach: Francisco Neto

The 23-player squad was announced on 7 February 2022. A week later, Andreia Jacinto withdrew due to injury and was replaced by Joana Martins.

No.	Pos.	Player	Date of birth (age)	Caps	Goals	Club
1	GK	Inês Pereira	26 May 1999 (aged 22)	24	0	(Switzerland) Servette
2	DF	Catarina Amado	21 July 1999 (aged 22)	8	0	(Portugal) Benfica
3	DF	Alicia Correia	29 April 2003 (aged 18)	5	0	(Portugal) Sporting CP
4	DF	Sílvia Rebelo	20 May 1989 (aged 32)	110	0	(Portugal) Benfica
5	DF	Joana Marchão	24 October 1996 (aged 25)	20	0	(Portugal) Sporting CP
6	MF	Joana Martins	4 October 2000 (aged 21)	2	0	(Portugal) Sporting CP
7	FW	Suzane Pires	17 August 1992 (aged 29)	25	0	(Brazil) Ferroviária
8	MF	Andreia Norton	15 August 1996 (aged 25)	54	4	(Portugal) Braga
9	FW	Ana Borges	15 June 1990 (aged 31)	136	11	(Portugal) Sporting CP
10	FW	Jéssica Silva	11 December 1994 (aged 27)	80	9	(Portugal) Benfica
11	MF	Tatiana Pinto	28 March 1994 (aged 27)	78	1	(Spain) Levante
12	GK	Patrícia Morais	17 June 1992 (aged 29)	72	0	(Portugal) Braga
13	MF	Fátima Pinto	16 January 1996 (aged 26)	62	2	(Portugal) Sporting CP
14	MF	Dolores Silva	7 August 1991 (aged 30)	129	14	(Portugal) Braga
15	DF	Carole Costa	3 May 1990 (aged 31)	133	13	(Portugal) Benfica
16	FW	Diana Silva	4 June 1995 (aged 26)	72	16	(Portugal) Sporting CP
17	FW	Lúcia Alves	22 October 1997 (aged 24)	1	0	(Portugal) Benfica
18	FW	Carolina Mendes	27 November 1987 (aged 34)	101	22	(Portugal) Braga
19	DF	Diana Gomes	26 July 1998 (aged 23)	16	3	(Portugal) Braga
20	MF	Kika Nazareth	17 November 2002 (aged 19)	11	0	(Portugal) Benfica
21	MF	Andreia Faria	19 April 2000 (aged 21)	10	0	(Portugal) Benfica
22	GK	Rute Costa	1 June 1994 (aged 27)	4	0	(Portugal) Famalicão
23	DF	Mariana Azevedo	27 September 1995 (aged 26)	0	0	(Portugal) Famalicão

=== Sweden ===
Coach: Peter Gerhardsson

The 25-player squad was announced on 8 February 2022, with Linda Sembrant named as a reserve player.

No.	Pos.	Player	Date of birth (age)	Caps	Goals	Club
1	GK	Zećira Mušović	26 May 1996 (aged 25)	5	0	(England) Chelsea
2	DF	Jonna Andersson	2 January 1993 (aged 29)	66	1	(England) Chelsea
3	DF	Emma Kullberg	25 September 1991 (aged 30)	9	0	(England) Brighton & Hove Albion
4	DF	Hanna Glas	16 April 1993 (aged 28)	51	0	(Germany) Bayern Munich
5	DF	Amanda Nildén	7 August 1998 (aged 23)	1	0	(Italy) Juventus
6	DF	Josefine Rybrink	19 January 1998 (aged 24)	3	0	(Sweden) Häcken
7	FW	Madelen Janogy	12 November 1995 (aged 26)	25	5	(Sweden) Hammarby
8	FW	Lina Hurtig	5 September 1995 (aged 26)	50	16	(Italy) Juventus
9	FW	Kosovare Asllani	29 July 1989 (aged 32)	156	39	(Spain) Real Madrid
10	FW	Sofia Jakobsson	23 April 1990 (aged 31)	134	23	(United States) San Diego Wave
11	FW	Stina Blackstenius	5 February 1996 (aged 26)	72	22	(England) Arsenal
12	GK	Jennifer Falk	26 April 1993 (aged 28)	11	0	(Sweden) Häcken
13	DF	Amanda Ilestedt	17 January 1993 (aged 29)	51	5	(France) Paris Saint-Germain
14	DF	Nathalie Björn	4 May 1997 (aged 24)	34	4	(England) Everton
15	MF	Julia Roddar	16 February 1992 (aged 30)	11	0	(United States) Washington Spirit
16	MF	Filippa Angeldal	14 July 1997 (aged 24)	23	5	(England) Manchester City
17	MF	Caroline Seger	19 March 1985 (aged 36)	225	31	(Sweden) Rosengård
18	FW	Fridolina Rolfö	24 November 1993 (aged 28)	61	21	(Spain) Barcelona
19	FW	Anna Anvegård	10 May 1997 (aged 24)	23	9	(England) Everton
20	MF	Hanna Bennison	16 October 2002 (aged 19)	18	0	(England) Everton
21	GK	Hedvig Lindahl	29 April 1983 (aged 38)	181	0	(Spain) Atlético Madrid
22	MF	Olivia Schough	11 March 1991 (aged 30)	94	11	(Sweden) Rosengård
23	MF	Elin Rubensson	11 May 1993 (aged 28)	70	3	(Sweden) Häcken
24	DF	Emma Berglund	19 December 1988 (aged 33)	57	1	(Sweden) Rosengård
25	MF	Johanna Rytting Kaneryd	12 December 1997 (aged 24)	8	0	(Sweden) Häcken

== Player representation ==
=== By club ===
Clubs with 3 or more players represented are listed.

Players	Club
12	(Italy) Juventus
7	(Portugal) Benfica, (Sweden) Häcken
6	(Italy) Roma, (Portugal) Sporting CP
5	(Italy) AC Milan, (Norway) Sandviken, (Portugal) Braga
4	(England) Chelsea, (England) Everton, (Norway) Vålerenga, (Sweden) Rosengård
3	(England) Arsenal, (England) Manchester United, (Italy) Inter Milan, (Spain) Real Madrid

=== By club nationality ===
Players	Clubs
32	Italy
20	England, Portugal
15	Norway
13	Sweden
7	Spain
5	Denmark
2	France, United States
1	Brazil, Germany, Switzerland

=== By club federation ===
Players	Federation
116	UEFA
2	CONCACAF
1	CONMEBOL

=== By representatives of domestic league ===
National squad	Players
Italy	24
Portugal	20
Norway	11
Sweden	8
Denmark	5
