= Serie A Women's Team of the Year =

Italian football award

Serie A Team of the Year
- Sport: Association football
- Competition: Serie A Women
- Awarded for: Eleven footballers considered to have performed the best in their position in each given Serie A Women season by vote of players
- Local name: Squadra dell’anno AIC femminile (Italian)
- Country: Italy
- Presented by: Italian Footballers' Association (AIC)

History
- First award: 2018–19
- Editions: 7
- Website: Gran Galà del Calcio (~2022–23); Women4Football (2023–24~)

The AIC Serie A Women's Team of the Year (in Italian: Squadra dell’anno AIC femminile) is an annual award given to a set of eleven female footballers in the top tier of Italian women's association football, the Serie A, who are considered to have performed the best during the previous calendar season.

The award was part of the Gran Galà del Calcio (formerly known as Oscar del Calcio), but it was rebranded as Women4Football in the 2022–23 season.

== Winners ==
Players in bold also won the Serie A Female Footballer of the Year award.

=== 2018–19 ===
Position	Player	Club	Appearance
GK	(Italy) Laura Giuliani	Juventus	1
DF	(Italy) Alia Guagni	Fiorentina	1
DF	(Italy) Sara Gama	Juventus	1
DF	(Italy) Cecilia Salvai	Juventus	1
DF	(Italy) Elisa Bartoli	Roma	1
MF	(Italy) Aurora Galli	Juventus	1
MF	(Italy) **Manuela Giugliano**	Milan	1
MF	(Italy) Valentina Cernoia	Juventus	1
FW	(Italy) Valentina Giacinti	Milan	1
FW	(Italy) Ilaria Mauro	Fiorentina	1
FW	(Italy) Barbara Bonansea	Juventus	1

=== 2019–20 ===
Position	Player	Club	Appearance
GK	(Italy) Laura Giuliani	Juventus	2
DF	(Italy) Alia Guagni	Fiorentina	2
DF	(Sweden) Linda Sembrant	Juventus	1
DF	(Italy) Lisa Boattin	Juventus	1
DF	(Italy) Elisa Bartoli	Roma	2
MF	(Italy) Aurora Galli	Juventus	2
MF	(Italy) Manuela Giugliano	Roma	2
MF	(Italy) Valentina Cernoia	Juventus	2
FW	(Italy) Daniela Sabatino	Sassuolo	1
FW	(Italy) Tatiana Bonetti	Fiorentina	1
FW	(Italy) **Cristiana Girelli**	Juventus	1

=== 2020–21 ===
Position	Player	Club	Appearance
GK	(Italy) Francesca Durante	Hellas Verona	1
DF	(Italy) Elena Linari	Roma	1
DF	(Italy) Cecilia Salvai	Juventus	2
DF	(Italy) Lisa Boattin	Juventus	2
DF	(Italy) Elisa Bartoli	Roma	3
MF	(Italy) Arianna Caruso	Juventus	1
MF	(Italy) Manuela Giugliano	Roma	3
MF	(Italy) Valentina Cernoia	Juventus	3
FW	(Italy) Annamaria Serturini	Roma	1
FW	(Italy) Benedetta Glionna	Empoli	1
FW	(Italy) **Cristiana Girelli**	Juventus	2

=== 2021–22 ===
Position	Player	Club	Appearance
GK	(France) Pauline Peyraud-Magnin	Juventus	1
DF	(Italy) **Lisa Boattin**	Juventus	3
DF	(Italy) Elena Linari	Roma	2
DF	(Italy) Maria Luisa Filangeri	Sassuolo	1
DF	(Italy) Martina Lenzini	Juventus	1
MF	(Italy) Flaminia Simonetti	Inter Milan	1
MF	(Italy) Arianna Caruso	Juventus	2
MF	(Brazil) Andressa Alves	Roma	1
MF	(Italy) Giada Greggi	Roma	1
FW	(Italy) Valentina Bergamaschi	Milan	1
FW	(Italy) Sofia Cantore	Sassuolo	1

=== 2022–23 ===
Position	Player	Club	Appearance
GK	(Italy) Francesca Durante	Internazionale	2
DF	(Italy) Lisa Boattin	Juventus	4
DF	(Italy) Elena Linari	Roma	3
DF	(Japan) Moeka Minami	Roma	1
DF	(Austria) Carina Wenninger	Roma	1
MF	(Brazil) Andressa Alves	Roma	2
MF	(Italy) Arianna Caruso	Juventus	3
MF	(Italy) Giada Greggi	Roma	2
MF	(Canada) Julia Grosso	Juventus	1
FW	(Malawi) **Tabitha Chawinga**	Inter Milan	1
FW	(Norway) Emilie Haavi	Roma	1

=== 2023–24 ===
Position	Player	Club	Appearance
GK	(Romania) Camelia Ceasar	Roma	1
DF	(Italy) Lucia Di Guglielmo	Roma	1
DF	(Italy) Martina Lenzini	Juventus	2
DF	(Italy) Elena Linari	Roma	4
DF	(Japan) Moeka Minami	Roma	2
MF	(Spain) Veronica Boquete	Fiorentina	1
MF	(Italy) Arianna Caruso	Juventus	4
MF	(Italy) **Manuela Giugliano**	Roma	4
MF	(Italy) Giada Greggi	Roma	3
FW	(Italy) Michela Cambiaghi	Inter Milan	1
FW	(Canada) Evelyne Viens	Roma	1

=== 2024–25 ===
Position	Player	Club	Appearance
GK	(Iceland) Cecilía Rán Rúnarsdóttir	Inter Milan	1
DF	(Italy) Lucia Di Guglielmo	Roma	2
DF	(Italy) Elisabetta Oliviero	Lazio	1
DF	(Bosnia and Herzegovina) Marija Milinković	Inter Milan	1
DF	(Spain) Ivana Andrés	Inter Milan	1
MF	(Spain) Veronica Boquete	Fiorentina	2
MF	(Italy) Giada Greggi	Roma	4
MF	(France) Clarisse Le Bihan	Lazio	1
MF	(Italy) Emma Severini	Fiorentina	1
FW	(Italy) **Sofia Cantore**	Juventus	2
FW	(Italy) Cristiana Girelli	Juventus	3

== Appearances by player ==
- 4 times
  - Lisa Boattin, Arianna Caruso, Manuela Giugliano, Giada Greggi, Elena Linari
- 3 times
  - Elisa Bartoli, Cristiana Girelli, Valentina Cernoia
- 2 times
  - Andressa Alves, Verónica Boquete, Sofia Cantore, Lucia Di Guglielmo, Francesca Durante, Aurora Galli, Laura Giuliani, Alia Guagni, Martina Lenzini, Moeka Minami, Cecilia Salvai
- 1 time
  - Ivana Andrés, Valentina Bergamaschi, Barbara Bonansea, Tatiana Bonetti, Michela Cambiaghi, Camelia Ceasar, Tabitha Chawinga, Maria Luisa Filangeri, Sara Gama, Valentina Giacinti, Benedetta Glionna, Julia Grosso, Emilie Haavi, Clarisse Le Bihan, Ilaria Mauro, Marija Milinković, Elisabetta Oliviero, Pauline Peyraud-Magnin, Cecilía Rán Rúnarsdóttir, Daniela Sabatino, Linda Sembrant, Annamaria Serturini, Emma Severini, Flaminia Simonetti, Evelyne Viens, Carina Wenninger

== Appearances by club ==
Club	Appearances
Juventus	28
Roma	25
Fiorentina	7
Inter Milan	7
Milan	3
Sassuolo	3
Lazio	2
Empoli	1
Verona	1
