= Moeka Minami =

Japanese footballer (born 1998)

Moeka Minami 南 萌華
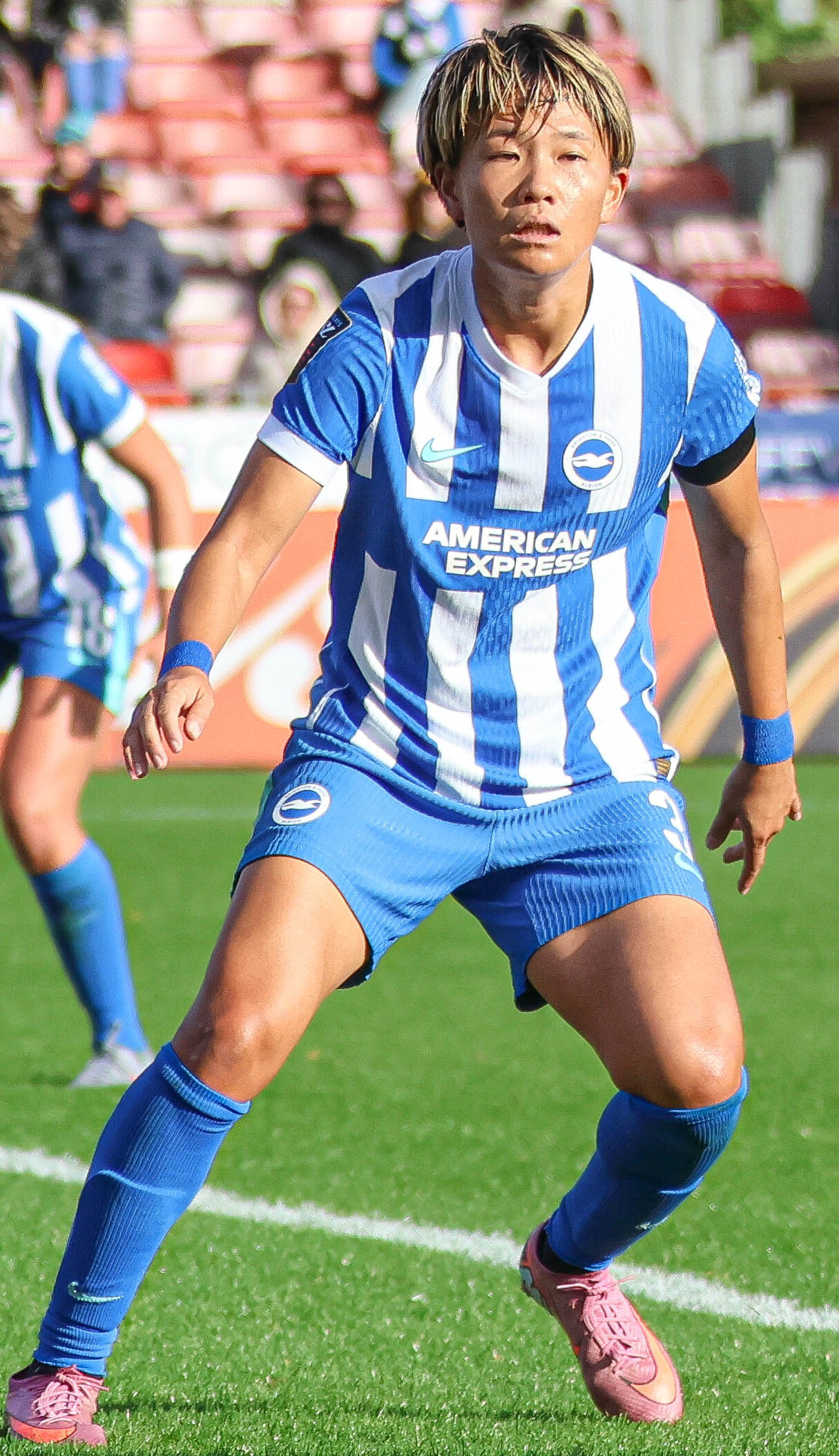
- Minami with Brighton & Hove Albion in 2025

Personal information
- Date of birth: 7 December 1998 (age 27)
- Place of birth: Yoshikawa, Saitama, Japan
- Height: 1.71 m (5 ft 7 in)
- Position: Centre back

Team information
- Current team: Brighton & Hove Albion
- Number: 3

Youth career
- Yoshikawa White Shark
- –2016: Urawa Reds

Senior career*
Years	Team	Apps	(Gls)
2017–2022	Urawa Reds	68	(3)
2022–2025	Roma	73	(6)
2025–	Brighton & Hove Albion	19	(0)

International career^{‡}
2014	Japan U-17	1	(0)
2018	Japan U-20	6	(0)
2019–	Japan	73	(5)
Medal record
Women's football
Representing Japan
AFC Women's Asian Cup
Winner	2026 Australia
FIFA U-20 Women's World Cup
Winner	2018 France
AFC U-19 Women's Championship
Winner	2017 China
FIFA U-17 Women's World Cup
Winner	2014 Costa Rica
AFC U-16 Women's Championship
Winner	2013 China
- * Club domestic league appearances and goals as of 12 September 2026 ‡ National team caps and goals as of 9 June 2026

Moeka Minami (南 萌華, Minami Moeka; Japanese: [mina̠mi̠ moe̞ka̠]) born 7 December 1998 is a Japanese professional footballer who plays as a defender for Women's Super League club Brighton & Hove Albion and the Japan national team.

== Early life ==
Minami was born in Saitama Prefecture on 7 December 1998. She attended high school in Saitama Prefectural Nanryō High School. She graduated from University of Tsukuba Physical Education College in 2021. She began her youth career when she joined the junior youth team of Urawa Red Diamonds Ladies.

== Club career ==
=== Urawa Reds ===
She was promoted to Nadeshiko League club Urawa Reds from the youth team in 2017.

=== AS Roma ===
On 24 July 2022, Minami signed a two-year contract with Italian Serie A club Roma. She made her debut for the club on 19 August 2022 in a 3–1 UEFA Champions League win against Glasgow City. On 10 September 2022, she scored her first goal for the club in a Serie A match against AC Milan. Later in the same month, she scored again for the club in a 4–1 win against Sparta Praha in the UEFA Champions League. On 5 November, Minami won her first silverware with Roma as they beaten Juventus in a penalty shootout in the 2022 Supercoppa Italiana. On 29 April 2023, she helped Roma clinched the 2022–23 Serie A title in a 2–1 win against Fiorentina, their first league title in club history.

On 8 February 2024, Minami penned a two-year contract extension with Roma which keeps her with the club until 30 June 2026. She won her second Serie A title back to back with Roma at the end of the 2023–24 Serie A season.

=== Brighton & Hove Albion ===
On 21 June 2025, it was announced that Minami had signed for Women's Super League club Brighton & Hove Albion.

== International career ==
=== Youth ===
In 2014, Minami was selected for the Japan U-17 national team for the 2014 U-17 World Cup. She played one game against Paraguay in the group stage. Japan went on to win the championship.

Minami was selected for the Japan U-20 national team for the 2018 U-20 World Cup. She played all six matches as center-back and team captain. Japan won the championship and Minami received the Bronze Ball award.

=== Senior ===
In February 2019, Minami was selected for the Japan national team for the SheBelieves Cup. At this tournament, on 2 March, she debuted as center back-against Brazil.

On 10 May 2019, Minami was included in the 23-player squad for the 2019 FIFA Women's World Cup.

Minami was selected as part of the 22 players squad for the 2020 Summer Olympics held in Japan in 2021. She started all 3 group matches for Japan.

On 7 January 2022, Minami was called up to the 2022 AFC Women's Asian Cup squad.

On 13 June 2023, she was included in the 23-player squad for the FIFA Women's World Cup 2023.

On 14 June 2024, Minami was included in the Japan squad for the 2024 Summer Olympics.

Minami was part of the Japan squad that won the 2025 SheBelieves Cup.

== Career statistics ==
=== Club ===
As of match played 12 September 2026

Appearances and goals by club, season and competition
Club	Season	League			National Cup (Note: includes Empress's Cup, Coppa Italia and Women's FA Cup)		League Cup (Note: includes Nadeshiko League Cup and Women's League Cup)		Continental (Note: includes UEFA Women's Champions League)		Others		Total	
Club	Season	Division	Apps	Goals	Apps	Goals	Apps	Goals	Apps	Goals	Apps	Goals	Apps	Goals
Urawa Reds	2017	Nadeshiko League	0	0	0	0	3	0	—		—		3	0
Urawa Reds	2018	Nadeshiko League	14	1	4	0	2	0	—		—		20	1
Urawa Reds	2019	Nadeshiko League	17	0	5	1	4	1	—		—		26	2
Urawa Reds	2020	Nadeshiko League	17	0	5	1	—		—		—		22	1
Urawa Reds	2021–22	WE League	20	2	4	0	—		—		—		24	2
Urawa Reds	Total		68	3	18	2	9	1	—		—		95	6
AS Roma	2022–23	Serie A	25	2	4	0	—		11	1	1 (Note: Appearance(s) in Supercoppa Italiana)	0	41	3
AS Roma	2023–24	Serie A	24	1	5	2	—		7	0	1	0	35	3
AS Roma	2024–25	Serie A	24	3	5	0	—		8	1	1	0	38	4
AS Roma	Total		73	6	14	2	—		26	2	3	0	114	10
Brighton & Hove Albion	2025–26	Women's Super League	17	0	5	0	1	0	—		—		23	0
Brighton & Hove Albion	2026–27	Women's Super League	2	0	0	0	0	0	—		—		2	0
Brighton & Hove Albion	Total		19	0	5	0	1	0	—		—		25	0
Career Total			160	9	37	4	10	1	26	2	3	0	234	16

=== International ===
As of match played 9 June 2026

Appearances and goals by national team and year
National Team	Year	Apps	Goals
Japan	2019	10	0
Japan	2020	2	0
Japan	2021	8	1
Japan	2022	9	0
Japan	2023	16	3
Japan	2024	11	0
Japan	2025	8	1
Japan	2026	9	0
Total		73	5

Scores and results list Japan's goal tally first, score column indicates score after each Minami goal.

List of international goals scored by Moeka Minami
No.	Date	Venue	Opponent	Score	Result	Competition	Ref
1	8 April 2021	Yurtec Stadium Sendai, Sendai, Japan	Paraguay	1–0	7–0	Friendly	
2	14 July 2023	Yurtec Stadium Sendai, Sendai, Japan	Panama	5–0	5–0	Friendly	
3	29 October 2023	Milliy Stadium, Tashkent, Uzbekistan	Uzbekistan	1–0	2–0	2024 AFC Women's Olympic Qualifying Tournament	
4	3 December 2023	Estádio do Morumbi, São Paulo, Brazil	Brazil	1–0	2–0	Friendly	
5	20 February 2025	Shell Energy Stadium, Houston, Texas, United States	Australia	4–0	4–0	2025 SheBelieves Cup	

== Honours ==
Urawa Reds

- Nadeshiko League: 2020
- Empress's Cup: 2021
- Empress's Cup runner-up: 2019, 2020
- Nadeshiko League Cup runner-up: 2017

AS Roma

- Serie A: 2022–23, 2023–24
- Coppa Italia: 2023–24
- Supercoppa Italiana: 2022, 2024

Japan U17

- AFC U-16 Women's Championship: 2013
- FIFA U-17 Women's World Cup: 2014

Japan U20

- AFC U-20 Women's Asian Championship: 2017
- FIFA U-20 Women's World Cup: 2018

Japan

- AFC Women's Asian Cup: 2026
- EAFF E-1 Football Championship: 2019
- SheBelieves Cup: 2025

Individual

- EAFF E-1 Football Championship MVP: 2019
- Nadeshiko League/WE League Best Eleven: 2019, 2020, 2021-2022

Individual

- Serie A Women's Team of the Year: 2022–23
