= Julia Grosso =

Canadian soccer player (born 2000)

- Grosso with the Chicago Stars in 2026

Personal information
- Full name: Julia Angela Grosso
- Date of birth: August 29, 2000 (age 26)
- Place of birth: Vancouver, British Columbia, Canada
- Height: 1.70 m (5 ft 7 in)
- Position: Midfielder

Team information
- Current team: Chicago Stars
- Number: 7

Youth career
- Vancouver Italian Canadian SC
- Cliff Avenue United
- Burnaby Girls SC
- –2014: Mountain United
- 2014–2018: Vancouver Whitecaps Girls Elite

College career
Years	Team	Apps	(Gls)
2018–2021	Texas Longhorns	60	(21)

Senior career*
Years	Team	Apps	(Gls)
2018	TSS FC Rovers		
2022–2024	Juventus	50	(9)
2024–	Chicago Stars	56	(4)

International career^{‡}
2014	Canada U15	5	(0)
2016	Canada U17	8	(0)
2018	Canada U20	5	(0)
2017–	Canada	86	(5)
Medal record
Women's football
Representing Canada
Olympic Games
Gold medal – first place	2020 Tokyo	Team
CONCACAF W Championship
Runner-up	2018 United States
Runner-up	2022 Mexico
CONCACAF Women's U-17 Championship
Third place	2016 Grenada
CONCACAF Girls' Under-15 Championship
Winner	2014 Cayman Islands
- * Club domestic league appearances and goals as of 05:45, November 2, 2026 (UTC) ‡ National team caps and goals as of October 12, 2026

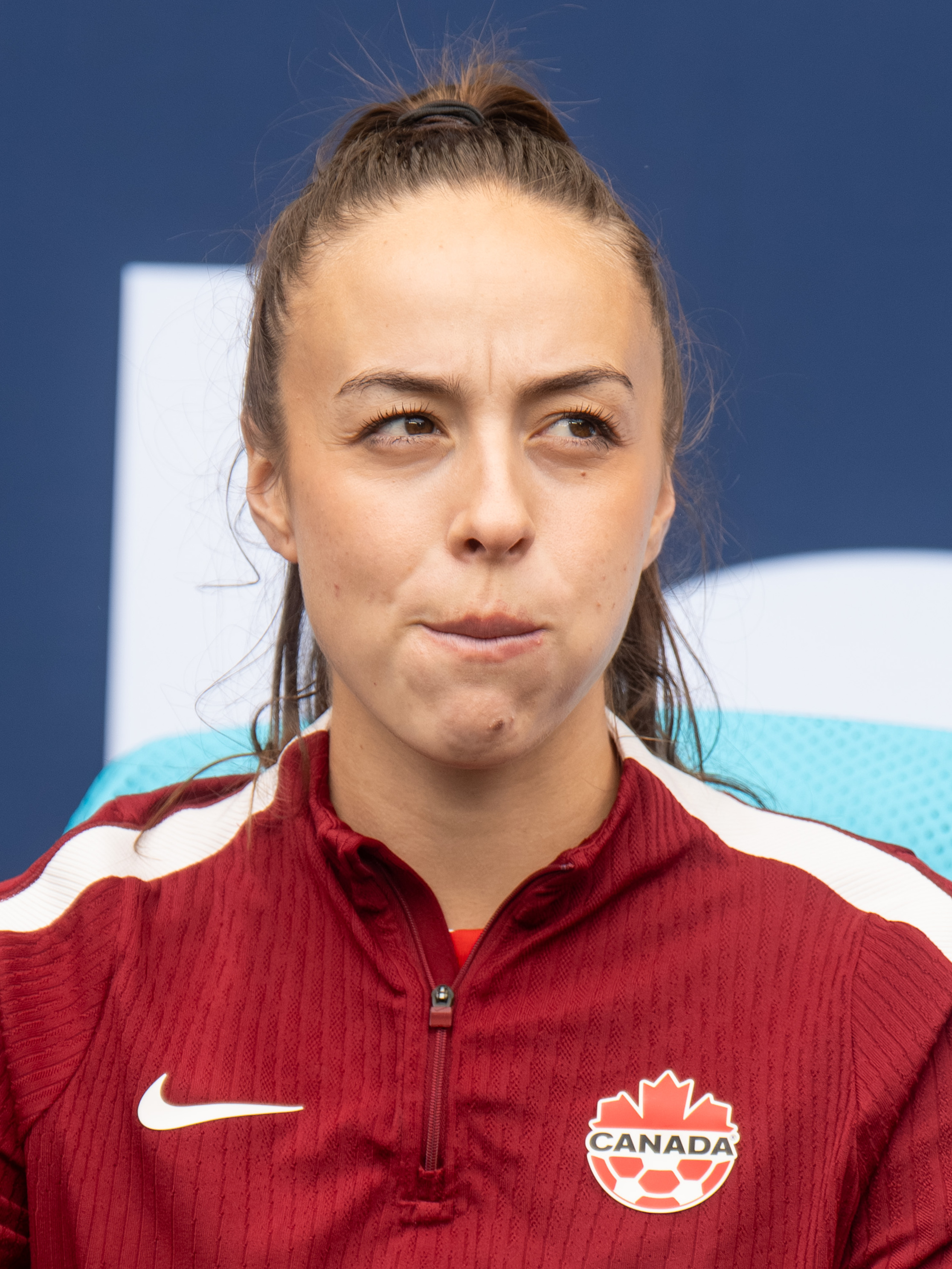
Grosso with the Canada in 2026

Julia Angela Grosso (born August 29, 2000) is a Canadian professional soccer player who plays as a midfielder for National Women's Soccer League (NWSL) club Chicago Stars FC and the Canada women's national team. She attained international prominence after scoring the title-winning penalty kick at the 2020 Summer Olympics, leading Canada to its first gold medal.

== Early life ==
Grosso was born in Vancouver, British Columbia. She is of Portuguese descent through her father, and Italian through her mother. She attended Burnaby Central Secondary where she played with the Whitecaps FC Girls Elite Rex. Future national teammate Jordyn Huitema attended the same school and program, and the two became close friends during this time. Her sister Carli was also a member of the Vancouver Whitecaps system. Grosso made her college debut for the Texas Longhorns on August 17, 2018, in a 3–0 win over the Rice Owls.

== Club career ==
=== Early career ===
Grosso signed with TSS FC Rovers of the Women's Premier Soccer League for the 2018 season.

=== Juventus ===
In December 2021, Grosso returned to her ancestral country Italy and joined Juventus on an initial one-year contract. She debuted for Juventus on January 16, 2022, in a 5–0 win against Pomigliano. In her first season with Juventus, the team completed the domestic treble with victories in Serie A, the Coppa Italia and the Supercoppa Italiana.

In a 2022 profile with DARBY, Grosso said that, despite the attention surrounding her Olympic penalty and move to Juventus, she did not feel additional pressure, explaining that she wanted to "keep working hard" and maintain the same mindset as she settled in at the club, and she also said that she was impressed by Juventus' history and immersive soccer culture. In the same profile, Grosso said that Cristiano Ronaldo was the player she most tried to emulate growing up and that it felt surreal to join the same club and use the same facilities he had used at Juventus.

Grosso's second season with the team saw her appear in 20 matches and score three goals. She also won her second Coppa Italia and was named the Serie A midfielder of the season.

After missing part of the 2023–24 season due to injury, she returned to the roster in time to participate in her second Supercoppa victory. Following the conclusion of the season, Grosso announced that her tenure at Juventus had come to an end.

=== Chicago Stars ===
On July 8, 2024, the Chicago Red Stars (later named Chicago Stars FC) announced that they had signed Grosso to a three-year contract through the 2026 season.

== International career ==
=== Youth ===
On August 7, 2014, Grosso made her first junior appearance for Canada with the national under-15 against Puerto Rico in a 5–0 victory at the CONCACAF Girls Under-15 Championship. She played twelve minutes in a substitute appearance. The Canadians would go on to win the inaugural edition of the tournament in a penalty shoot-out over Haiti. Grosso would make five appearances for the under-15 national team in the tournament, the only five U-15 caps of her career.

Grosso's debut for the under-17 team came on March 3, 2016, at the CONCACAF Women's Under-17 Championship in a 3–0 win against Guatemala. Canada would finish in third place at the tournament and Grosso was named to the Best XI, en route to qualification for the 2016 FIFA U-17 Women's World Cup. Grosso proceeded to play in the 2016 FIFA U-17 Women's World Cup in Jordan. There, she played 90 minutes in all three group games, recording an assist in the first game, a 3–2 win over Cameroon. Canada would draw and lose their next games against Germany and Venezuela, respectively, resulting in a third-place finish in the group and failure to proceed from the group stage. The game against Venezuela was Grosso's last for the under-17 team.

On January 18, 2018, Grosso made her debut for the under-20 team in a 3–1 victory over Costa Rica in the opening match of the 2018 CONCACAF Women's U-20 Championship. Canada would lose the semi-finals on penalties to Mexico after a 1–1 draw after extra time. Canada needed to defeat Haiti in the third place match in order to qualify for the 2018 FIFA U-20 Women's World Cup, but lost the game 1–0 and did not qualify for the U-20 World Cup. Grosso played every minute of the five-game campaign.

=== Senior ===
Grosso received her first call-up to the senior team under coach John Herdman for a home and home series against the United States on November 9 and 12, 2017. While Grosso did not feature in the first match, she came on as a ninetieth minute substitute for Janine Beckie in a 3–1 loss at Avaya Stadium in San Jose, California. Grosso was also a part of Canada's squad for the 2018 Algarve Cup where the team finished fifth.

Grosso was named to the Canadian squad for the 2019 FIFA Women's World Cup in France. However, she did not take the field for any of the team's four games, which she would later describe as "very frustrating." The event ended in disappointment for the Canadians, who were eliminated in the round of 16 by Sweden.

After the onset of the COVID-19 pandemic delayed the 2020 Summer Olympics by a year, Grosso was named to the Canadian squad for the occasion. Canada advanced to the Olympic final for the first time in its history. On August 6, 2021, she scored the winning penalty kick in the shootout of the gold medal game against Sweden, winning Canada their first gold medal in women's soccer. Grosso has said that she does not clearly remember what she was thinking as she prepared to take the penalty, describing herself as initially nervous while waiting but "blank" once she walked up to the spot and stating that her focus was entirely on the ball. This was the first time Grosso had scored on the international circuit at any level in any situation, and immediately raised her profile at home. She was by this point regarded as a rising talent, but had been continuing to have trouble finding her way into the starting lineup due to the presence of veteran Desiree Scott.

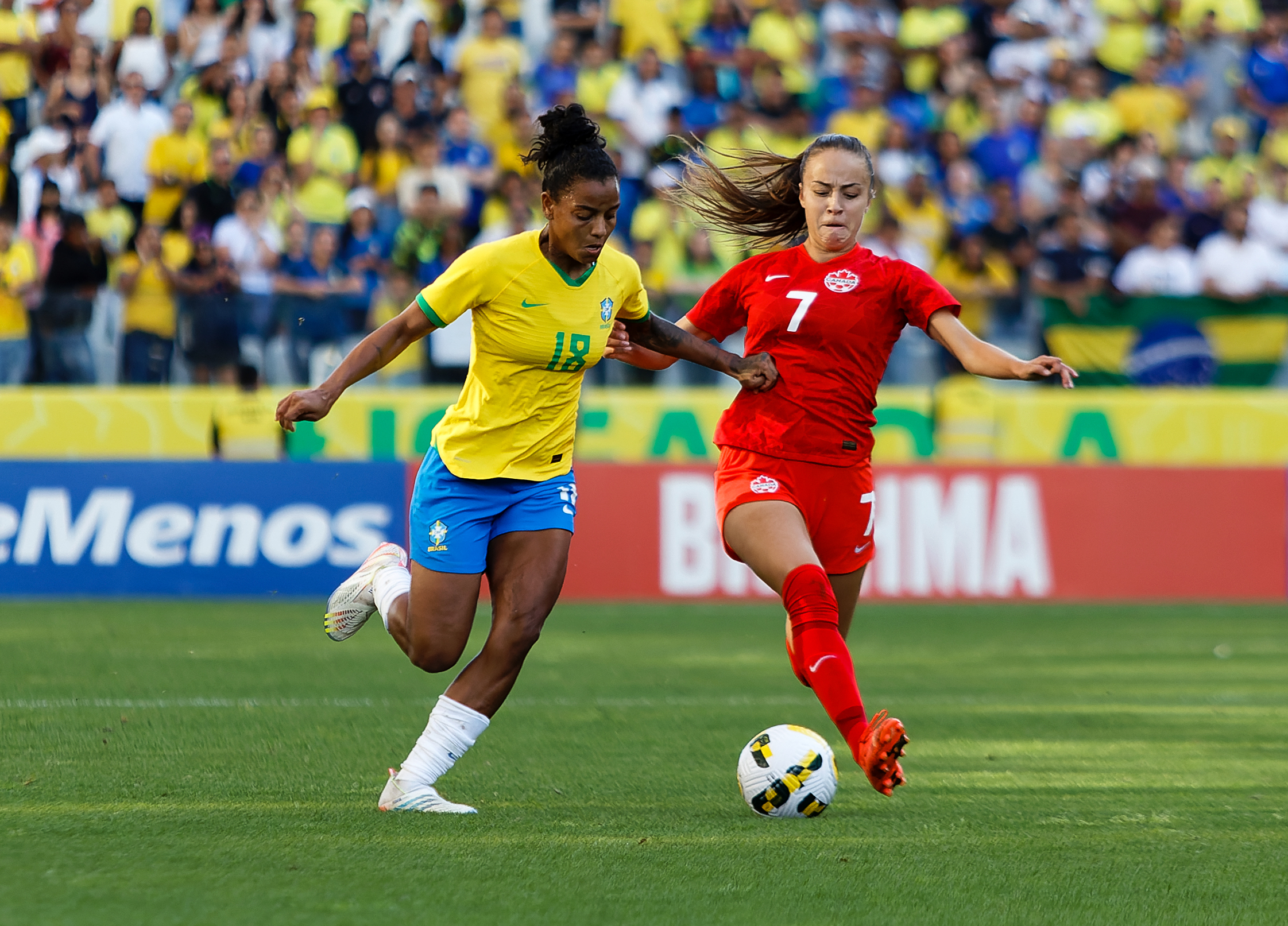
Grosso with Canada in 2022

Joining the Canada national team again for the 2022 CONCACAF W Championship, Grosso scored her first international goal in the tournament opener against Trinidad and Tobago, and then managed a second goal for a brace, with Canada winning a 6–0 rout. Grosso scored the lone goal of the next game against Panama, in the process qualifying Canada for the 2023 FIFA Women's World Cup. Grosso did not play in the third group stage game, but appeared as a substitute in both the semi-final and finals. She was one of four players to score three goals in the tournament, but won the Golden Boot as top scorer due to having played the fewest minutes. She was also named to the tournament's Best XI.

Grosso was named to the Canadian squad for the 2023 FIFA Women's World Cup in Australia and New Zealand. During the group stage match against Ireland, with Canada down by a goal toward the end of what was generally judged a poor first half for the team, Grosso's cross into the box was deflected into the net by Irish defender Megan Connolly, tying the game. Canada would on to win 2–1, though Grosso was substituted off for Sophie Schmidt in the second half. Canada was ultimately eliminated from the tournament after a 4–0 loss to Australia in their final group match; Grosso was substituted after the first half, having struggled defensively.

Grosso was called up to the Canada squad for the 2024 CONCACAF W Gold Cup, which Canada finished as semifinalists.

Grosso was called up to the Canada squad for the 2024 Summer Olympics.

== Style of play ==
Grosso is a left-footed midfielder who has creativity and technique as well as intensity and contrast and can also play as left-back.

== Personal life ==
Grosso has been in a relationship with Major League Baseball player Jeremy Peña since December 2024 and they were engaged in December 2025.

Grosso has said that she was initially surprised to hear that younger girls were looking up to her as a role model, noting that she still felt very young, but has also described inspiring the next generation as one of the reasons she plays and said she wants younger players to know that they can "dream as big as you want". She has also said that Canada has "a lot of fans" and that the country's football culture is "here", describing Canada as "a soccer country" whose profile in the sport continues to grow.

== Career statistics ==
=== Club ===
As of August 4, 2026

Appearances and goals by club, season and competition
Club	Season	League			Domestic cup		Continental		Other		Total	
Club	Season	Division	Apps	Goals	Apps	Goals	Apps	Goals	Apps	Goals	Apps	Goals
Juventus	2021–22	Serie A	9	0	5	0	1	0	0	0	15	0
Juventus	2022–23	Serie A	20	3	4	1	9	0	1	0	34	4
Juventus	2023–24	Serie A	21	6	2	0	2	0	1	0	25	6
Juventus	Total		50	9	11	1	12	0	2	0	75	10
Chicago Stars	2024	NWSL	10	0	0	0	0	0	1	0	11	0
Chicago Stars	2025	NWSL	24	2	0	0	0	0	0	0	24	2
Chicago Stars	2026	NWSL	14	0	0	0	0	0	0	0	14	0
Chicago Stars	Total		48	2	0	0	0	0	1	0	49	2
Career total			98	11	11	1	12	0	3	0	124	12

=== International ===
As of match played October 12, 2026

Appearances and goals by national team and year
National team	Year	Apps	Goals
Canada	2017	1	0
Canada	2018	8	0
Canada	2019	7	0
Canada	2020	5	0
Canada	2021	10	0
Canada	2022	15	3
Canada	2023	11	0
Canada	2024	11	0
Canada	2025	11	2
Canada	2026	7	0
Total		86	5

Scores and results list Canada's goal tally first, score column indicates score after each Grosso goal.

List of international goals scored by Julia Grosso
No.	Date	Venue	Opponent	Score	Result	Competition
1	July 5, 2022	Estadio BBVA, Guadalupe, Mexico	Trinidad and Tobago	2–0	6–0	2022 CONCACAF W Championship
2	July 5, 2022	Estadio BBVA, Guadalupe, Mexico	Trinidad and Tobago	3–0	6–0	2022 CONCACAF W Championship
3	July 8, 2022	Estadio Universitario, San Nicolás de los Garza, Mexico	Panama	1–0	1–0	2022 CONCACAF W Championship
4	February 19, 2025	Pinatar Arena, San Pedro del Pinatar, Spain	China	1–0	1–1	2025 Pinatar Cup
5	April 4, 2025	BC Place, Vancouver, Canada	Argentina	3–0	3–0	Friendly

== Honours ==
Juventus

- Serie A: 2021–22
- Coppa Italia: 2021–22, 2022–23
- Supercoppa Italiana: 2021, 2023

Canada U15

- CONCACAF Girls' U-15 Championship: 2014

Canada

- Summer Olympics: 2020
- CONCACAF W Championship Runner-up: 2018, 2022

Individual

- CONCACAF W Championship Best XI: 2022
- CONCACAF W Championship Golden Boot: 2022
- Serie A Best Midfielder: 2022–23
- Serie A Team of the Season: 2022–23
- AIC Serie A Women's Team of the Year: 2022–23
- CONCACAF Women's U-17 Championship Best XI: 2016
- Vancouver Whitecaps FC Showcase All-Star: 2016
- Vancouver Whitecaps FC Most Promising Player: 2016
- Canada Games All-Star: 2017
- BC Soccer Youth Player of the Year Female: 2018
