= Andressa Alves =

Brazilian footballer (born 1992)

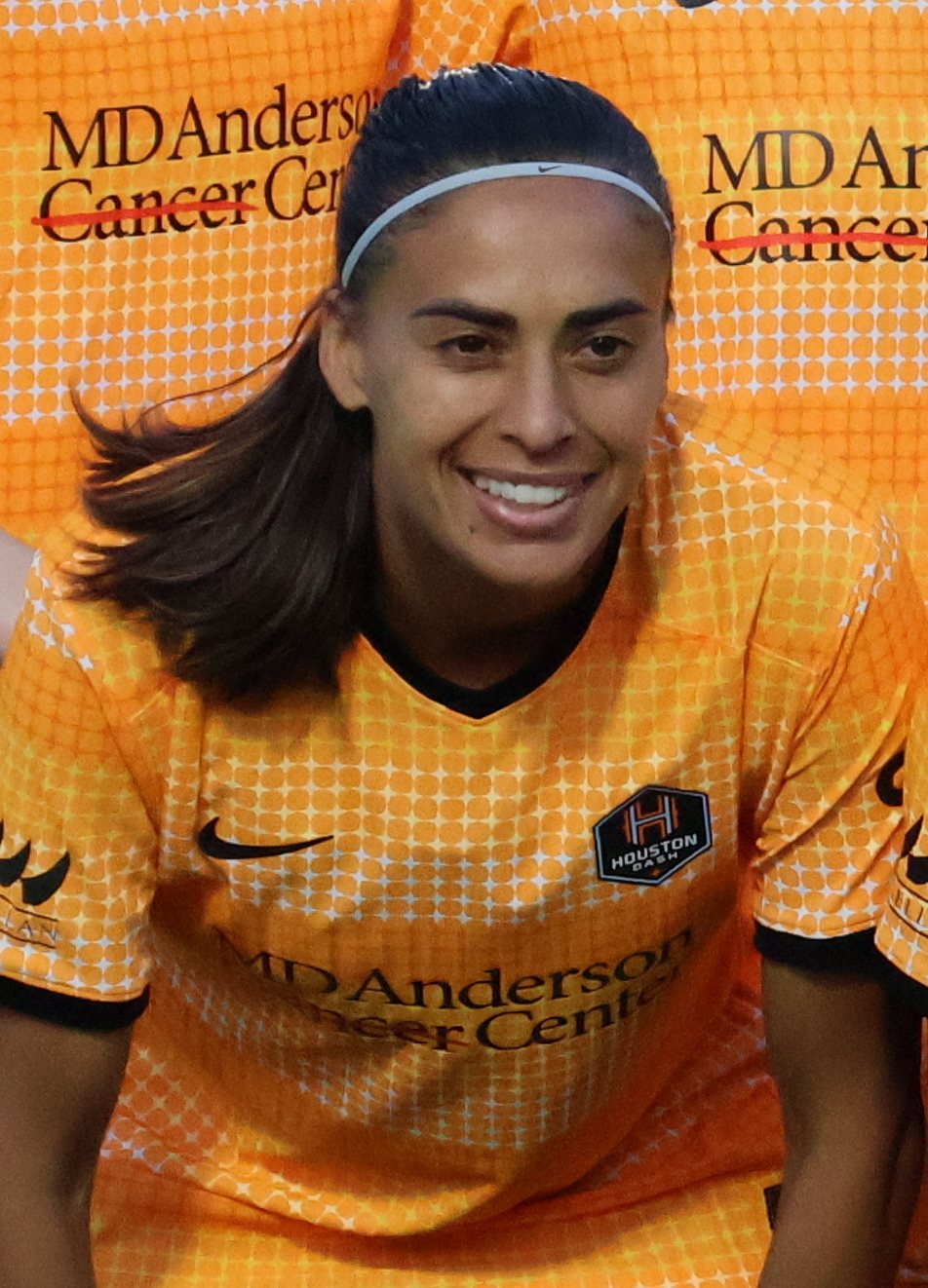
- Andressa with the Houston Dash in 2024

Personal information
- Full name: Andressa Alves da Silva
- Date of birth: 10 November 1992 (age 33)
- Place of birth: São Paulo, Brazil
- Height: 1.68 m (5 ft 6 in)
- Positions: Attacking midfielder; forward

Team information
- Current team: Corinthians
- Number: 8

Senior career*
Years	Team	Apps	(Gls)
2009–2010	Juventus-SP		
2011–2012	Foz Cataratas		
2013	Centro Olímpico		
2013	Ferroviária		
2013–2014	São José		
2015	Boston Breakers	0	(0)
2015–2016	Montpellier	20	(8)
2016–2019	Barcelona	67	(25)
2019–2023	AS Roma	70	(26)
2023–2024	Houston Dash	28	(2)
2025–	Corinthians	7	(4)

International career^{‡}
2010–2012	Brazil U-20	6	
2012–	Brazil	105	(20)
Medal record
Women's football
Representing Brazil
Pan American Games
Gold medal – first place	2015 Toronto	Team
- * Club domestic league appearances and goals as of 01:19, 7 October 2024 (UTC) ‡ National team caps and goals as of 30 July 2021

Andressa Alves da Silva (born 10 November 1992), commonly known as Andressa Alves or simply Andressa, is a Brazilian professional footballer who plays as a forward for Corinthians. She previously played for Italian Serie A club AS Roma and FC Barcelona of the Spanish Primera División. She won her first cap for the Brazil women's national team in 2012 and has represented her country at multiple World Cups.

== Club career ==
Andressa transferred from Centro Olímpico to Ferroviária in May 2013. In November 2013, Andressa left Ferroviária to sign for 2013 Copa Libertadores Femenina winners São José.

In November 2014, she ended her stay in São José and signed a contract with NWSL team Boston Breakers. Ultimately she never joined the Breakers as she was instead called into Brazil's residency camp for the 2015 FIFA Women's World Cup. During the World Cup, French club Montpellier announced that they had concluded the transfer of Andressa.

Andressa left Montpellier after one season, signing for FC Barcelona in June 2016. She left the Spanish club in 2019. Andressa then moved to Italy and signed for Roma on 15 July 2019. Her performances for club and country led to her being shortlisted for the FIFPro World 11 award in September 2019. Andressa made her debut for Roma as a wide forward, but was soon re-positioned in deep midfield for the rest of the Serie A 2019–20 season. In her second season with the Italian club, Andressa frequently switched roles between deep midfield and attacking midfield depending on the opponents Roma was facing. She has been relied upon by Roma as one of the chief playmakers in the team, choosing to extend her stay with the club with a new contract in May 2021.

Two days after she signed her contract extension, Andressa would start for Roma in the 2021 Coppa Italia final against AC Milan. Roma won the match on penalties, and Andressa helped Roma win its first major trophy. Andressa made 103 appearances across all competitions in her career at Roma, the fifth Roma player to surpass 100, while scoring 40 goals and 15 assists. On 13 January 2021, she became only the second player in club history to score a hat-trick.

On 28 June 2023, Andressa and American club Houston Dash announced that she had signed a contract to play for the team through 2024, with an option for an additional year, and would join the club after the 2023 FIFA Women's World Cup.

On 13 December 2024, Andressa and Brazilian club Corinthians announced that she had signed a contract to play for them through 2027 after her contract with Dash ended.

== International career ==
After representing Brazil in the 2010 and 2012 editions of the FIFA U-20 Women's World Cup, Andressa made her senior debut at the 2012 Torneio Internacional Cidade de São Paulo de Futebol Feminino.

At the 2014 Copa América Femenina, Andressa scored the second goal in Brazil's 6–0 rout of Argentina. At the 2015 FIFA Women's World Cup, she scored the only goal in Brazil's group match against Spain, which secured her team's place in the second round. After Brazil's subsequent elimination by Australia, she remained in Canada as part of the winning Brazilian team at the 2015 Pan American Games in Toronto.

On 27 June 2023, Andressa was named to Brazil's squad for the 2023 FIFA Women's World Cup.

== Style of play ==
Barcelona described Andressa as: "a left-footed player who can slot in anywhere on the left-hand side of the park and who is especially attack-minded in her approach to the game". It was also noted that she is versatile enough to play on the right or as a centre-forward. She is relatively experienced for a 23-year-old after playing international football for four seasons.

Andressa uses her ability to shield the ball in possession all over the pitch, appearing in a number of roles for both club and country. She has played as a full-back at the senior level for Brazil and a deep-lying midfield playmaker for the Italian club Roma. Her dribbling ability with the ball makes her elusive when opponents try to close her down, and her ability to pick out the right pass means her teams frequently trust her with playmaking responsibilities in order to keep her side in control of the game. Andressa also shows notable ability when it comes to direct free-kick attempts on goal, as well as calm under pressure from the penalty spot.

== Personal life ==
Andressa is married to Francielle.

== Career statistics ==
=== International goals ===
Goal	Date	Location	Opponent	#	Score	Result	Competition
1	2012-12-19	São Paulo, Brazil	Denmark	1.1	2–0	2–2	Torneio Internacional 2012
2	2013-06-19	Stockholm, Sweden	Sweden	1.1	1–1	1–1	Friendly game
3	2014-09-12	Loja, Ecuador	Bolivia	1.1	2–0	6–0	Copa América 2014
4	2014-09-14	Loja, Ecuador	Paraguay	1.1	1–1	4–1	Copa América 2014
5	2014-09-27	Quito, Ecuador	Argentina	1.1	2–0	6–0	Copa América 2014
6	2014-12-18	Brasília, Brazil	China	1.1	4–0	4–1	Torneio Internacional 2014
7	2015-03-06	Lagos, Portugal	Sweden	1.1	2–0	2–0	2015 Algarve Cup
8	2015-03-11	Albufeira, Portugal	Switzerland	1.1	4–1	4–1	2015 Algarve Cup
9	2015-06-13	Montreal, Canada	Spain	1.1	1–0	1–0	2015 FIFA Women's World Cup
10	2015-07-19	Toronto, Canada	Canada	1.1	1–0	2–0	2015 Pan American Games
11	2015-07-25	Toronto, Canada	Colombia	1.1	3–0	4–0	2015 Pan American Games
12	2015-12-13	Natal, Brazil	Mexico	1.1	4–0	6–0	Torneio Internacional Natal 2015
13	2015-12-16	Natal, Brazil	Canada	1.1	1–0	2–1	Torneio Internacional Natal 2015
14	2015-12-20	Natal, Brazil	Canada	1.1	1–1	3–1	Torneio Internacional Natal 2015
15	2016-08-04	Rio de Janeiro, Brazil	China	1.1	2–0	3–0	Olympics 2016
16	2018-04-13	Coquimbo, Chile	Bolivia	1.1	3–0	7–0	2018 Copa América Femenina
17	2019-02-27	Chester, Pennsylvania, United States	England	1.1	1–0	1–2	2019 SheBelieves Cup
18	2019-06-11	Cartagena, Spain	Russia	1.1	3–0	3–0	Friendly game
19	2021-07-21	Rifu, Japan	China	1.1	4–0	5–0	Olympics 2020
20	2021-07-27	Saitama, Japan	Zambia	1.1	1–0	1–0	Olympics 2020
21	2023-04-06	London, England	England	1.1	1–1	1–1	Finalissima 2023

== Honours ==
AS Roma

- Serie A: 2022–23
- Supercoppa Italiana: 2022

Individual

- Serie A Women's Team of the Year: 2021–22, 2022–23

== See also ==
- List of women's footballers with 100 or more international caps
