= Giada Greggi =

Italian footballer (born 2000)

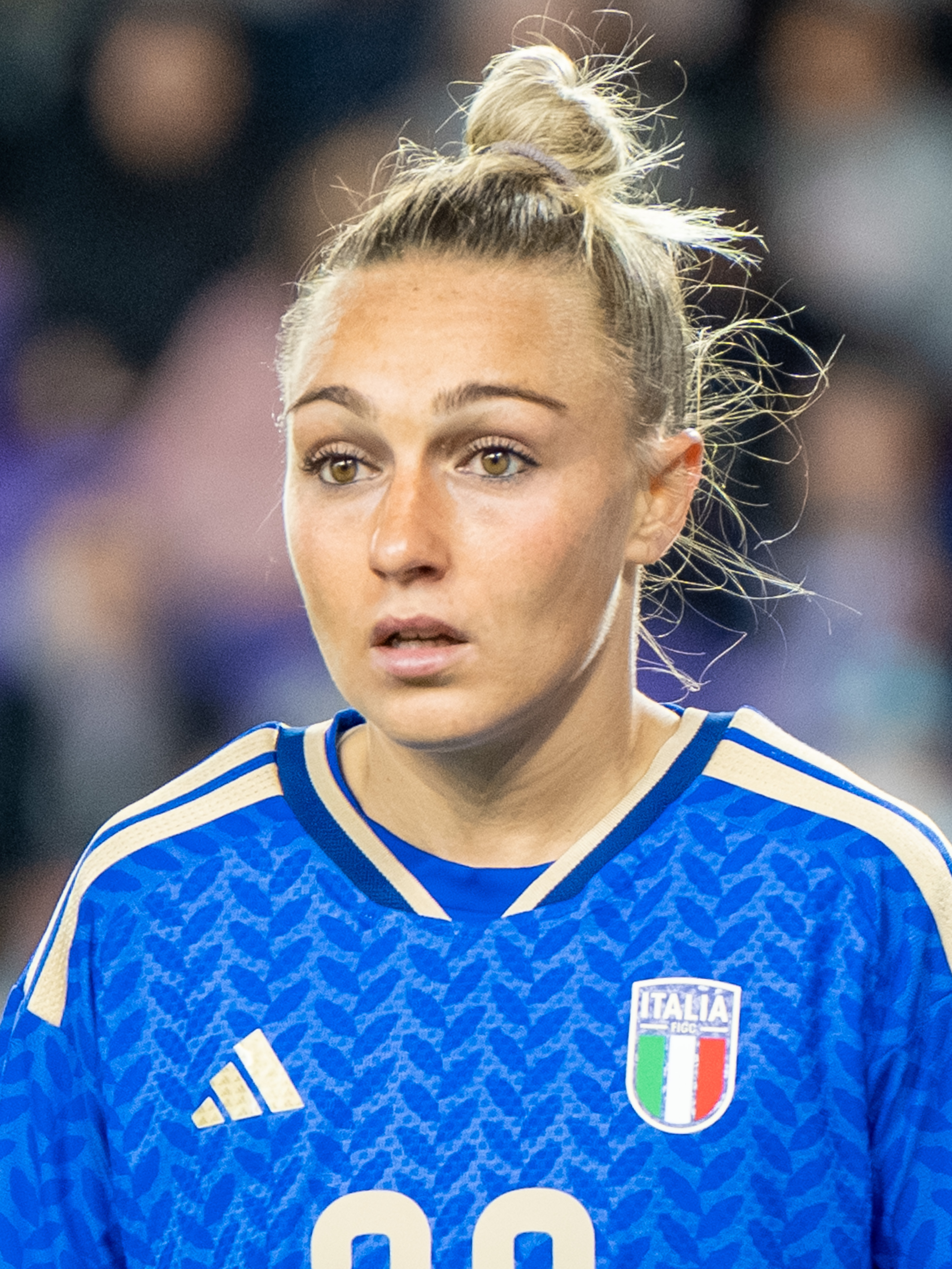
- Greggi with Italy in 2025

Personal information
- Date of birth: 18 February 2000 (age 26)
- Place of birth: Rome, Italy
- Height: 1.56 m (5 ft 1 in)
- Position: Midfielder

Team information
- Current team: Roma
- Number: 20

Senior career*
Years	Team	Apps	(Gls)
2014–2018	Res Roma	69	(2)
2018–	Roma	75	(2)

International career^{‡}
	Italy U-17 (futsal)	3	(1)
2015–2017	Italy U17	17	(1)
2017–2019	Italy U19	16	(1)
2019–	Italy	41	(2)
- * Club domestic league appearances and goals as of 14:28, 19 March 2023 (UTC) ‡ National team caps and goals as of 15:20, 11 October 2025 (UTC)

Giada Greggi (Italian: [ˈdʒaːda ˈɡredːʒi]; born 18 February 2000) is an Italian professional footballer who plays as a midfielder for Serie A club A.S. Roma and the Italy national team. Greggi played for 4 years in the youth of Ajax, and won the national league twice with them.

== Club career ==
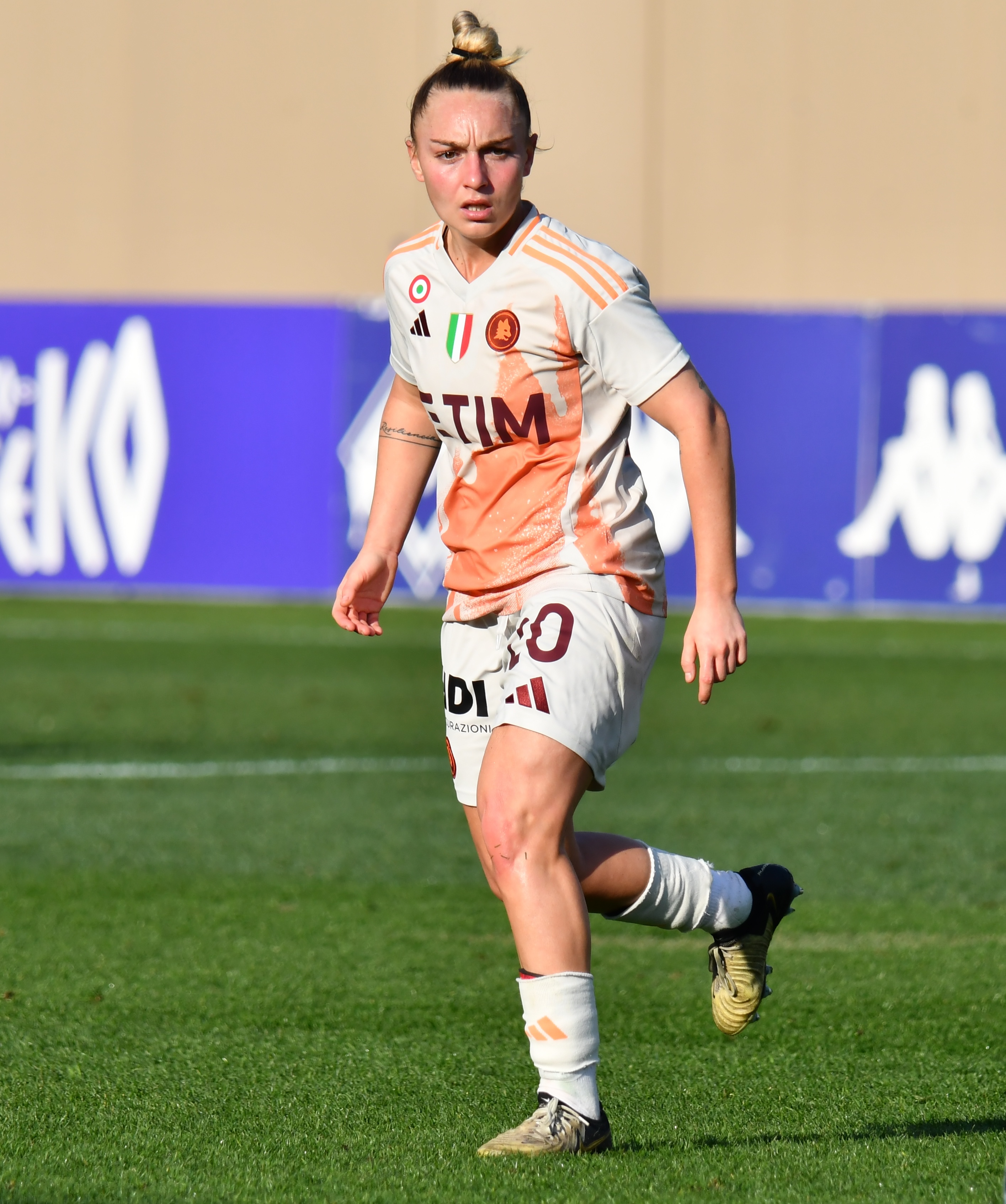
Greggi playing for Roma in 2025

Greggi began her career with RES Roma, making her Serie A debut with the club in the 2014-2015 season when Greggi was fourteen years old. Greggi alternated between appearances for the senior and Primavera RES Roma sides, winning three consecutive Primavera league titles with the club at youth level. RES Roma then sold their right to participate in Serie A to newly-formed club A.S. Roma in 2018, and transferred Greggi's playing rights to her new club.

Greggi played nearly all games in all competitions during her first season playing for A.S. Roma in the 2018-19 season. Her performances led to her winning Tuttosport's Italian Young Player of the Year award in women's football, the following winter of 2019. Despite the fact that Greggi saw less playing time for A.S. Roma in her second season with the club, she was called up to senior international duty by Italy coach Milena Bertolini. In Greggi's third season with A.S. Roma, she suffered an early-season setback through a cruciate ligament injury on 5 October 2020.

The long-term injury kept Greggi out of action for most of the 2020-21 season. The Italian midfielder would return to Roma's starting lineup in the very last matchday against Napoli on 22 May 2021. Just over one week later, Greggi then made an appearance off the substitutes bench in Roma's Coppa Italia final victory over AC Milan. Greggi secured her first senior winner's medal with her hometown club after the Coppa Italia victory.

== International career ==
Greggi was first called up to Italy's youth squads in 2015 and made her debut for the Italy U-17 football team on 11 April 2015. She then rose to the U-19 ranks for her country in 2017, before being called up to the senior Italy squad in September 2019.

Greggi made her debut for the senior Italy team on 8 October 2019 and followed it up with a second appearance on 12 November 2019, where she would score her first senior goal for Italy in their 5-0 victory over Malta.

On 25 June 2025, Greggi was called up to the Italy squad for the UEFA Women's Euro 2025.

== Style of play ==
Greggi emphasises passing and movement off the ball, often looking to string together 1-2 passes over small distances in order to move around opponents and keep her team's numerical advantage in any area of the pitch. She shows an ability to shield the ball and can often be relied upon to resist the opponent's pressure when she is in possession. She shows a high degree of anticipation in defence, using this ability to intercept passes and cut off opponents from receiving the ball.

== Career statistics ==
=== Club ===
As of match played 2 July 2025

Appearances and goals by club, season and competition
Club	Season	League			Coppa Italia		Continental		Other (Note: includes Supercoppa Italiana)		Total	
Club	Season	Division	Apps	Goals	Apps	Goals	Apps	Goals	Apps	Goals	Apps	Goals
Res Roma	2014–15	Serie A	15	0	?	?	–		–		15	0
Res Roma	2015–16	Serie A	17	0	5	3	–		–		22	3
Res Roma	2016–17	Serie A	19	1	1	0	–		–		20	1
Res Roma	2017–18	Serie A	18	1	3	1	–		–		21	2
Res Roma	Total		69	2	9	4	–		–		78	6
A.S. Roma	2018–19	Serie A	21	2	4	2	–		–		25	4
A.S. Roma	2019–20	Serie A	13	0	3	0	–		–		16	0
A.S. Roma	2020–21	Serie A	4	0	1	0	–		–		5	0
A.S. Roma	2021–22	Serie A	18	0	6	0	–		0	0	24	0
A.S. Roma	2022–23	Serie A	25	3	3	0	10	0	1	0	39	3
A.S. Roma	2023–24	Serie A	24	4	5	0	0	0	6	0	35	4
A.S. Roma	2024–25	Serie A	19	2	3	0	6	0	1	0	29	2
A.S. Roma	Total		99	8	16	2	10	0	7	0	131	10
Career total			168	10	25	6	10	0	7	0	209	16

=== International ===
As of match played 24 October 2025

Appearances and goals by national team and year
National team	Year	Apps	Goals
Italy	2019	2	1
Italy	2020	0	0
Italy	2021	0	0
Italy	2022	4	0
Italy	2023	11	0
Italy	2024	10	0
Italy	2025	6	1
Total		33	2

Scores and results list Italy's goal tally first, score column indicates score after each Greggi goal.

List of international goals scored by Giada Greggi
No.	Date	Venue	Opponent	Score	Result	Competition
1.	12 November 2019	Stadio Teofilo Patini, Castel di Sangro, Italy	Malta	5–0	5–0	UEFA Women's Euro 2022 qualifying
2.	24 October 2025	Stadio Giuseppe Sinigaglia, Como, Italy	Japan	1–0	1–1	Friendly
3.	14 April 2026	Dubočica Stadium, Leskovac, Serbia	Serbia	6–0	6–0	2027 FIFA Women's World Cup qualification

== Honours ==
A.S. Roma

- Coppa Italia: 2020–21
- Supercoppa Italiana: 2022

Individual

- Serie A Women's Team of the Year: 2021–22, 2022–23
