= Cecilía Rán Rúnarsdóttir =

Icelandic footballer (born 2003)

Personal information
- Full name: Cecilía Rán Rúnarsdóttir
- Date of birth: 26 July 2003 (age 23)
- Place of birth: Iceland
- Height: 1.88 m (6 ft 2 in)
- Position: Goalkeeper

Team information
- Current team: Inter Milan
- Number: 1

Youth career
- 200?–2010: Þróttur Reykjavík
- 2010–2018: Afturelding
- 2018–2020: Fylkir

Senior career*
Years	Team	Apps	(Gls)
2017–2018	Afturelding/Fram	18	(0)
2018–2020	Fylkir	30	(0)
2021	KIF Örebro	4	(0)
2021–2022	Everton	0	(0)
2021	→ KIF Örebro (loan)	3	(0)
2022–2024	Bayern Munich II	18	(0)
2022–2023	→ Bayern Munich (loan)	1	(0)
2024–2025	→ Inter Milan (loan)	23	(0)
2025–	Inter Milan	27	(0)

International career^{‡}
2018	Iceland U-16	9	(0)
2018–2019	Iceland U-17	12	(0)
2019	Iceland U-19	3	(0)
2020–	Iceland	32	(0)
- * Club domestic league appearances and goals as of 21 November 2026 ‡ National team caps and goals as of 11 October 2026

Cecilía Rán Rúnarsdóttir (born 26 July 2003) is an Icelandic professional footballer for who plays as a goalkeeper for Serie A club Inter Milan and the Icelandic national football team.

== Early life ==
Cecilía started playing football around the age of 6 with Afturelding. At the age of 10, she started playing as a goalkeeper.

== Club career ==
Cecilía started her senior career with Afturelding/Fram, a joint team off Afturelding and Knattspyrnufélagið Fram, in 2017 in the 2. deild kvenna where she helped the team finish first. In 2018, she played 13 matches in the second-tier Inkasso league and was named the league's Best Young Player by opposing coaches and team captains. After the season, in October 2018, she signed with Fylkir which had won promotion from the Inkasso league to the top-tier Úrvalsdeild kvenna. She had a great start with Fylkir in the beginning of the season, including an outstanding performance when Fylkir unexpectedly knocked out the reigning Cup holders, Breiðablik, in the Icelandic Cup. After the season she was named the best Young Player of the Year.

In March 2021, Cecilía signed with KIF Örebro for the 2021 season.

In August 2021, Cecilía signed a three-year contract with English club Everton and was immediately loaned back to KIF Örebro for the remainder of the 2021 Damallsvenskan season.

In January 2022, Cecilía joined German club FC Bayern Munich on loan until 30 June 2022. In July 2022, Bayern Munich announced that Cecilía had signed a 4-year contract with the club.

In July 2024, Cecilía was loaned to Inter Milan. Following the season, she was named the league's goalkeeper of the year. In the summer of 2025, Inter Milan bought her from Bayern.

On 1 July 2025, Cecilía signed a four-year contract with Inter Milan until 30 June 2029.

== International career ==
In August 2019, Cecilía was selected to the Icelandic national team for the first time by head coach Jón Þór Hauksson ahead of its UEFA Euro 2020 qualifying matches. On 4 March 2020, she started her first match in a 1–0 victory against Northern Ireland, becoming the youngest ever goalkeeper for Iceland and breaking Þóra Björg Helgadóttir's record by 148 days.

On 13 June 2025, Cecilía was called up to the Iceland squad for the UEFA Women's Euro 2025.

== Honours ==
Afturelding/Fram

- 2. deild kvenna: 2017

Fylkir

- Reykjavik Women Cup: 2020
- Icelandic League Cup B: 2019

Bayern Munich

- Frauen-Bundesliga: 2022–23, 2023–24

Inter Milan

- Serie A runner-up: 2025–26

Iceland

- Pinatar Cup: 2023

Individual

- Úrvalsdeild Young Player of the Year: 2020
- Serie A Best Goalkeeper: 2024–25
- Serie A Team of the Season: 2024–25
- AIC Serie A Women's Team of the Year: 2024–25
