= Manuela Giugliano =

Italian footballer (born 1997)

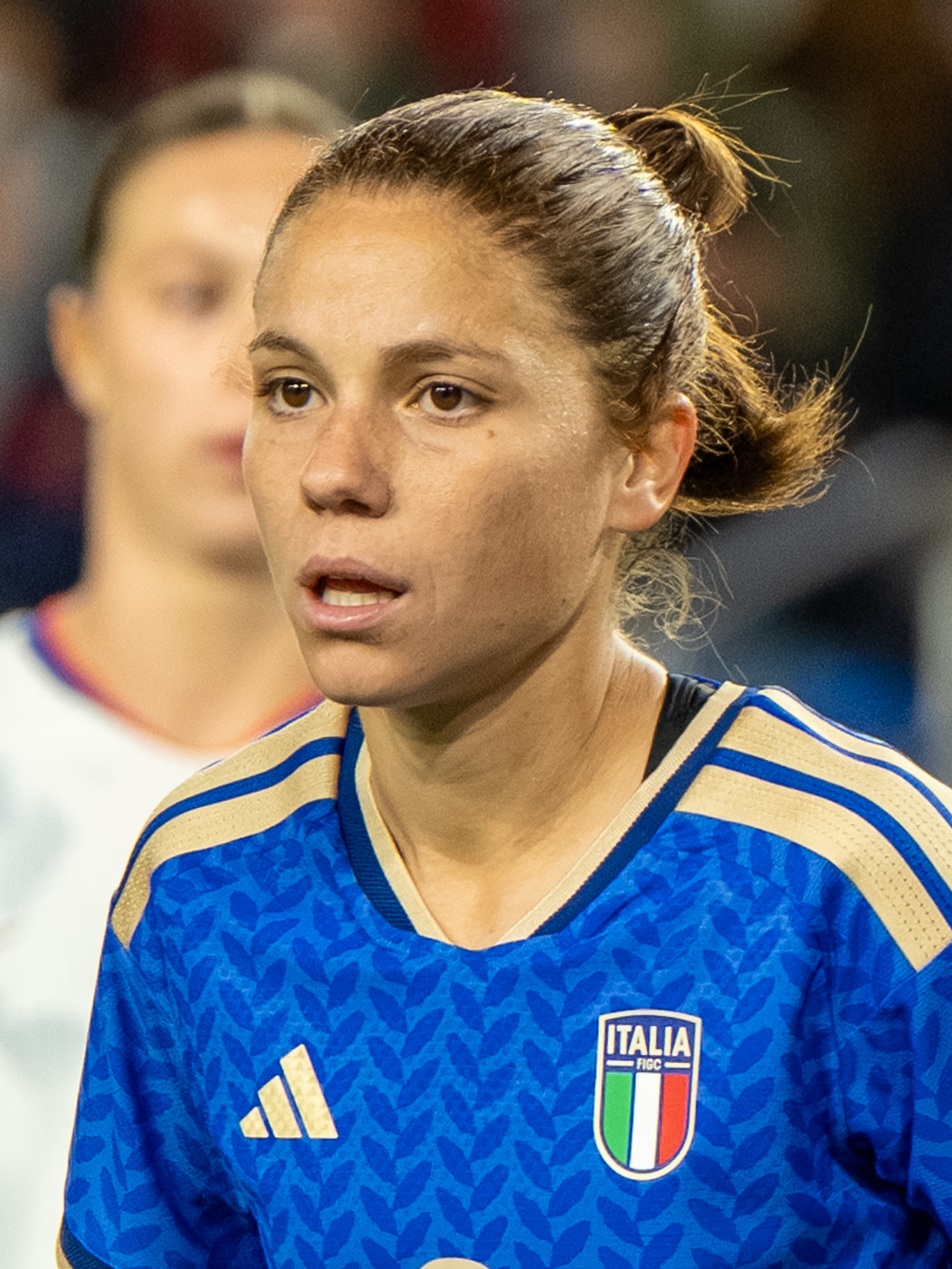
- Giugliano playing for Italy in 2025

Personal information
- Date of birth: 18 August 1997 (age 29)
- Place of birth: Castelfranco Veneto, Italy
- Height: 1.60 m (5 ft 3 in)
- Position: Midfielder

Team information
- Current team: Roma
- Number: 10

Senior career*
Years	Team	Apps	(Gls)
2013–2014	Pordenone	16	(1)
2014–2015	Torres	22	(3)
2015–2016	Mozzanica	15	(10)
2016–2017	Hellas Verona	21	(15)
2017–2018	Brescia	22	(3)
2018–2019	AC Milan	20	(3)
2019–	Roma	147	(51)

International career^{‡}
2012–2014	Italy U17	22	(14)
2014–2015	Italy U19	6	(5)
2014–	Italy	102	(11)
- * Club domestic league appearances and goals as of 16 May 2026 ‡ National team caps and goals as of 11 October 2026

Manuela Giugliano (Italian: [ma.nuˈɛ.la dʒuʎˈʎa.no]; born 18 August 1997) is an Italian professional footballer who plays as a midfielder for Serie A club Roma and the Italy national football team.

== Club career ==
Giugliano played for ACFD Pordenone before joining ASD Torres Calcio in 2014. The following year she signed for ASD Mozzanica. In the summer of 2016, Giugliano agreed to move abroad and play for Primera Iberdrola side Atlético Madrid but then reversed her decision to move to Spain for personal reasons. On 22 September 2016, she returned to her native Italy to sign for AGSM Verona. She then joined ACF Brescia in 2017 before moving to Milan the next season as part of Milan's acquisition of Brescia's Serie A license.

After a single season spent with AC Milan, Giugliano then moved to Roma on 16 July 2019. The move was seen as a coup for Roma, given the Serie A club were signing Giugliano from rivals AC Milan and following Giugliano's performances with Italy at the 2019 World Cup.

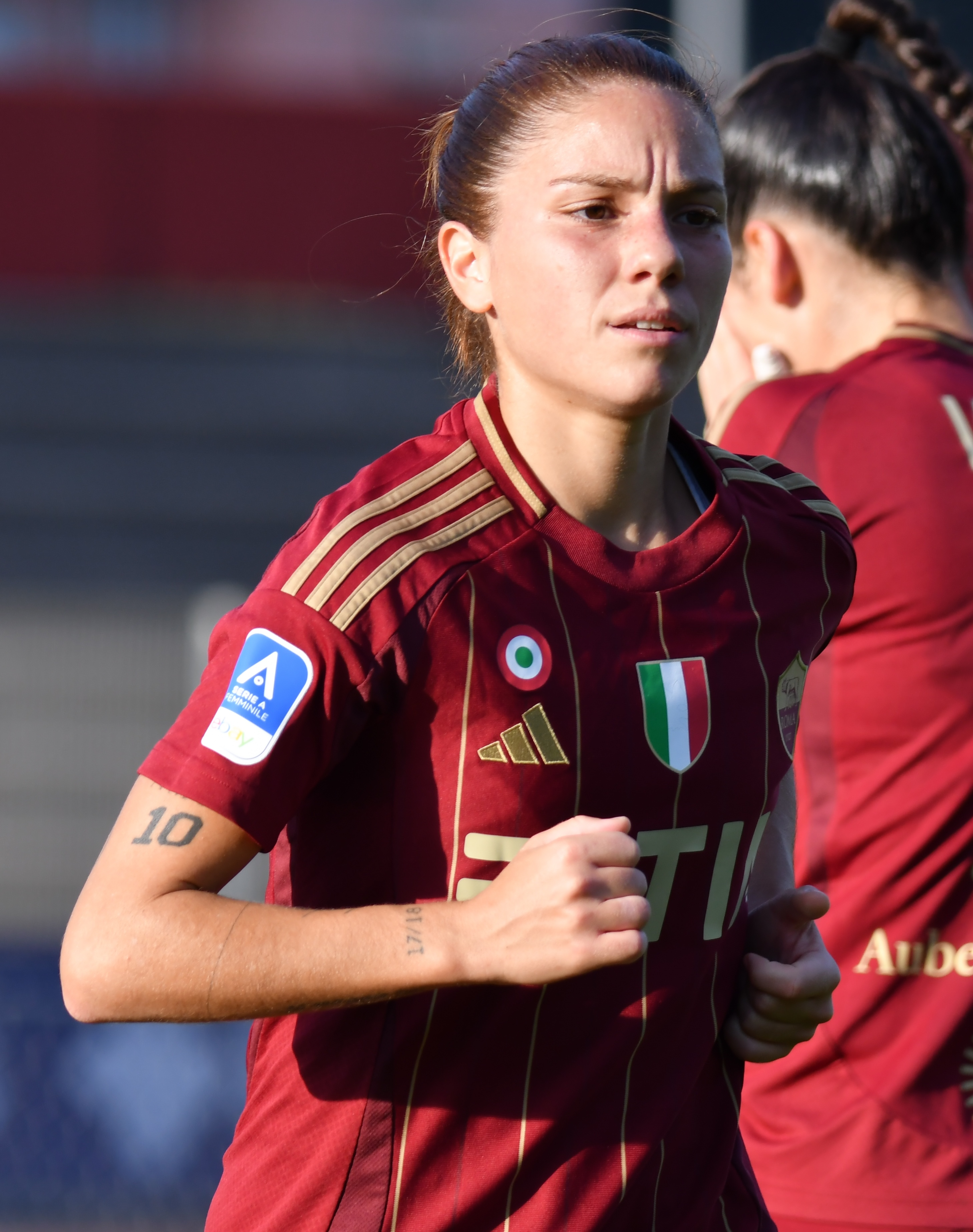
Giugliano playing for Roma in 2024

During her first season with Roma, and largely owed to her performances with Italy during the 2019 World Cup, Giugliano won Italian football's Female Player of the Year award at the 2019 Gran Galà del Calcio.

Currently, Roma is Giugliano's first and only club in her senior career where she has chosen to stay longer than 12 months, going as far as to sign a three-year contract extension in August 2020. Giugliano then went on to become part of Roma's victorious Coppa Italia 2021 campaign, helping the club to win its first major trophy since A.S. Roma's inception in 2018.

== International career ==
Giugliano was called up to be part of the Italy U17 for the 2014 FIFA U-17 Women's World Cup, where she played six games and scored three goals. She was called up to be part of the U17 national team for the 2014 UEFA Women's Under-17 Championship. She made her senior debut in a 2–1 win against Ukraine on 25 October 2014. She scored her first international goal in a 6–1 win against Georgia on 18 September 2015, scoring in the 23rd minute.

She was included by manager Antonio Cabrini in Italy's squad for the UEFA Women's Euro 2017. Giugliano was also called up to Milena Bertolini's Italy squad for the 2019 World Cup, after a 20-year absence from the tournament for the Azzurre, where Giugliano's performances in the Italy midfield took plaudits around the world and helped Italy reach the quarter-finals. In an April 2020 interview with Marco Migaleddu, Giugliano claimed her World Cup performance against Brazil in the group stage won her many loyal Brazilian fans who still follow her career today. In 2021, Giugliano was part of Bertolini's Italy team that qualified for the UEFA Euro 2022 tournament.

On 26 June 2022, Giugliano was announced in the Italy squad for the UEFA Women's Euro 2022.

On 2 July 2023, Giugliano was called up to the 23-player Italy squad for the 2023 FIFA Women's World Cup.

On 25 June 2025, Giugliano was called up to the Italy squad for the UEFA Women's Euro 2025.

== Style of play ==
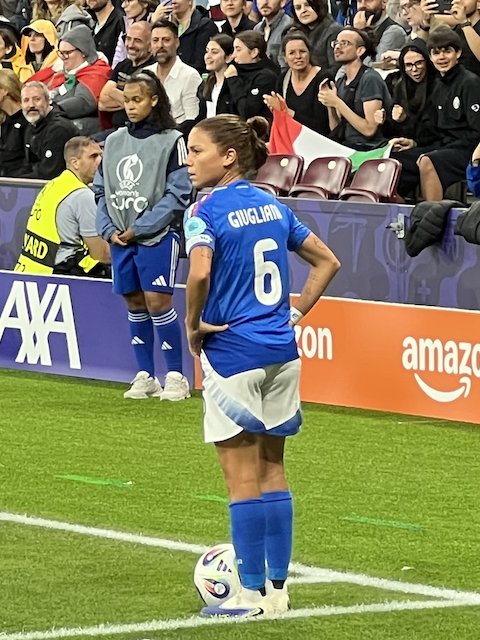
Giugliano taking a corner during Euro 2025

Manuela Giugliano is a versatile talent who is able to carry out defensive, attacking and transition play to a very high degree of execution. She initially relied on her ball-striking technique and dead-ball technique to mould herself as an attacking midfielder at youth and senior level. However, it was her move to Brescia that sparked a re-think of her career, as Giugliano chose to move back deeper into midfield and rely on her ability to intercept passes in order to influence games. She cites Andrea Pirlo as a role model for this phase of her career.

Giugliano's defensive qualities earned her a key role with Milena Bertolini's Italy, as well as inheriting the number 10 jersey with Roma. She retains the vision to make accurate and early long-range passes to the frontline, from deep midfield, as well as the ability to find key passes into the box when Giugliano moves further up the pitch. Her set-piece ability also makes her a frequent source of assists from corners, for both club and country.

== Personal life ==
Giugliano is lesbian. She grew up in Istrana, in the Treviso area, but all her family are from Naples.

== Career statistics ==
=== Club ===
As of match played 1 May 2024

Appearances and goals by club, season and competition
Club	Season	League			Coppa Italia		Continental (Note: includes UEFA Women's Champions League)		Other (Note: includes Supercoppa Italiana)		Total	
Club	Season	Division	Apps	Goals	Apps	Goals	Apps	Goals	Apps	Goals	Apps	Goals
Pordenone	2013–14	Serie A	16	1	?	?	—		—		16	1
Torres	2014–15	Serie A	23	3	2	1	3	0	—		28	4
Mozzanica	2015–16	Serie A	15	10	3	1	—		—		18	11
Verona	2016–17	Serie A	21	15	3	2	1	0	1	0	26	17
Brescia	2017–18	Serie A	22	3	6	0	4	0	1	0	33	3
A.C. Milan	2018–19	Serie A	20	3	4	3	—		—		24	6
A.S. Roma	2019–20	Serie A	12	2	1	0	—		—		13	2
A.S. Roma	2020–21	Serie A	21	4	1	0	—		1	0	23	4
A.S. Roma	2021–22	Serie A	19	4	6	2	—		1	0	26	6
A.S. Roma	2022–23	Serie A	23	6	4	1	12	3	1	0	40	10
A.S. Roma	2023–24	Serie A	22	10	4	1	8	5	1	0	35	16
A.S. Roma	Total		97	26	16	4	20	8	3	0	137	38
Career total			214	61	34	11	28	8	6	0	282	70

=== International ===
As of match played 9 April 2024

Appearances and goals by national team and year
National team	Year	Apps	Goals
Italy	2014	1	0
Italy	2015	5	1
Italy	2016	0	0
Italy	2017	6	1
Italy	2018	10	1
Italy	2019	19	2
Italy	2020	2	0
Italy	2021	7	1
Italy	2022	12	1
Italy	2023	13	2
Italy	2024	2	0
Total		77	9

Scores and results list Italy's goal tally first, score column indicates score after each Giuliano goal.

List of international goals scored by Manuela Giugliano
No.	Date	Venue	Opponent	Score	Result	Competition
1.	18 September 2015	Stadio Alberto Picco, La Spezia, Italy	Georgia	2–1	6–1	UEFA Women's Euro 2017 qualifying
2.	8 March 2017	GSZ Stadium, Larnaca, Cyprus	Czech Republic	6–2	6–2	2017 Cyprus Women's Cup
3.	5 March 2018	AEK Arena, Larnaca, Cyprus	Finland	2–2	2–2	2018 Cyprus Women's Cup
4.	8 October 2019	Stadio Renzo Barbera, Palermo, Italy	Bosnia and Herzegovina	2–0	2–0	UEFA Women's Euro 2022 qualifying
5.	12 November 2019	Stadio Teofilo Patini, Castel di Sangro, Italy	Malta	4–0	5–0	UEFA Women's Euro 2022 qualifying
6.	24 February 2021	Stadio Artemio Franchi, Florence, Italy	Israel	12–0	12–0	UEFA Women's Euro 2022 qualifying
7.	2 September 2022	Zimbru Stadium, Chișinău, Moldova	Moldova	1–0	8–0	2023 FIFA Women's World Cup qualification
8.	16 February 2023	Stadium MK, Milton Keynes, England	Belgium	1–1	1–2	2023 Arnold Clark Cup
9.	5 December 2023	Stadio Ennio Tardini, Parma, Italy	Switzerland	1–0	3–0	2023–24 UEFA Women's Nations League
10.	4 June 2024	Stadio Paolo Mazza, Ferrara, Italy	Norway	1–0	1–1	UEFA Women's Euro 2025 qualifying
11.	16 July 2024	Stadio Druso, Bolzano, Italy	Finland	2–0	4–0	UEFA Women's Euro 2025 qualifying

== Honours ==
Brescia

- Supercoppa Italiana: 2017

Roma

- Serie A: 2022–23, 2023–24, 2025–26
- Coppa Italia: 2020–21, 2023–24, 2025–26
- Supercoppa Italiana: 2022, 2024

Italy U17

- FIFA U-17 Women's World Cup Third-place: 2014
- UEFA Women's Under-17 Championship Third-place: 2014

Individual

- Serie A MVP: 2023–24, 2025–26
- Serie A Team of the Season: 2023–24, 2024–25, 2025–26
- AIC Serie A Female Footballer of the Year: 2018–19, 2023-24
- AIC Serie A Women's Team of the Year: 2018–19, 2019–20, 2020–21, 2023–24
- Pallone Azzurro: 2015
