= 2017 Nadeshiko League Cup final =

JEF United Chiba Ladies	Urawa Reds Ladies
1	0
- Date: August 12, 2017
- Venue: Nishigaoka Soccer Stadium, Tokyo

2017 Nadeshiko League Cup final was the 10th final of the Nadeshiko League Cup competition. The final was played at Nishigaoka Soccer Stadium in Tokyo on August 12, 2017. JEF United Chiba Ladies won the championship.

== Overview ==
JEF United Chiba Ladies won their 1st title, by defeating Urawa Reds Ladies 1–0.

== Match details ==
August 12, 2017

JEF United Chiba Ladies	1-0	Urawa Reds Ladies
? (?)	Report

Nishigaoka Soccer Stadium

== See also ==
- 2017 Nadeshiko League Cup
