= Francesca Durante =

Italian footballer (born 1997)

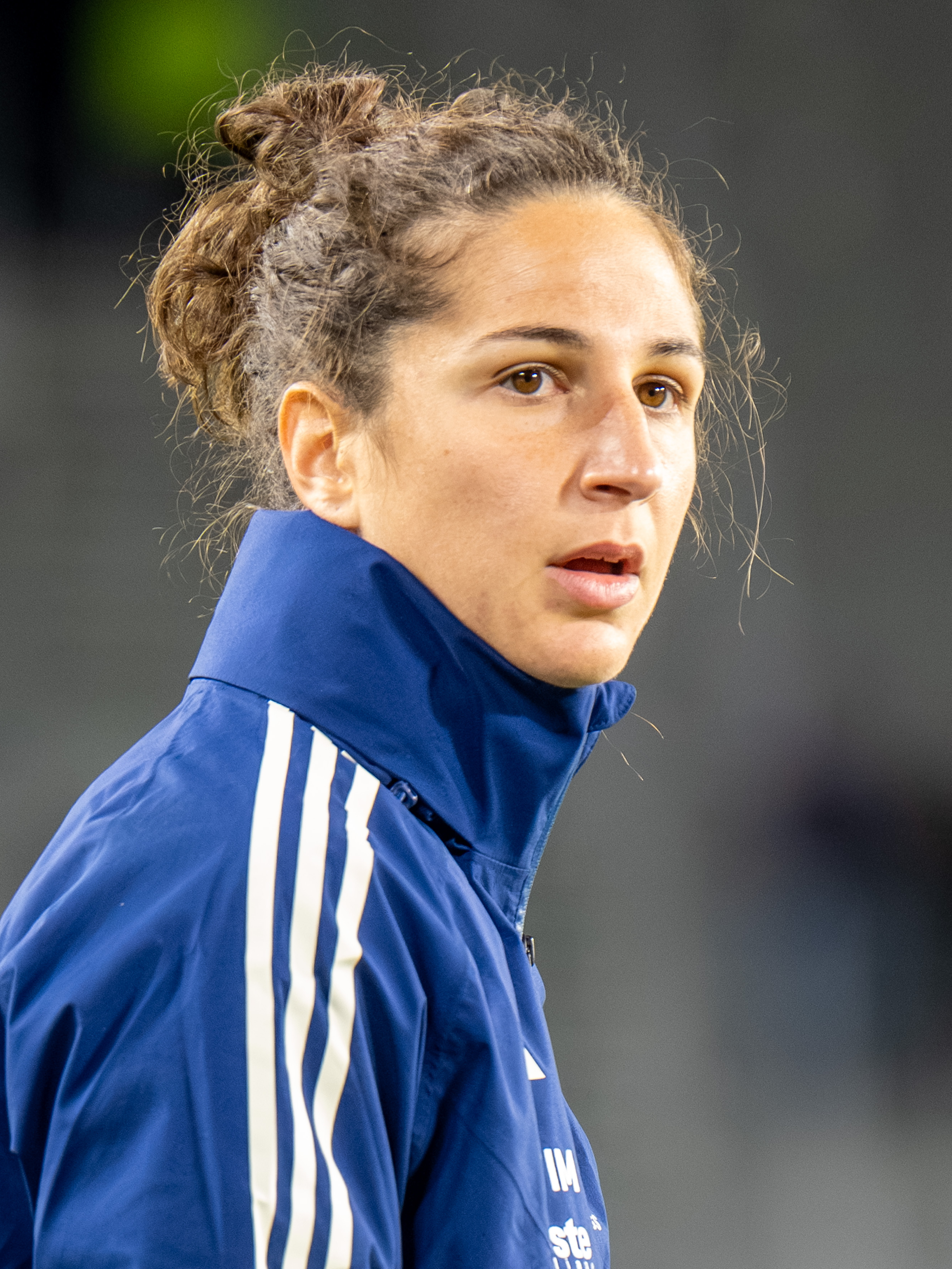
- Durante with Italy in 2025

Personal information
- Date of birth: 12 February 1997 (age 29)
- Place of birth: Genoa, Italy
- Height: 1.82 m (6 ft 0 in)
- Position: Goalkeeper

Team information
- Current team: Como 1907
- Number: 2

Senior career*
Years	Team	Apps	(Gls)
2012–2013	Sarzanese	23	(0)
2013–2014	Scalese	6	(0)
2014–2015	Firenze	3	(0)
2015–2021	Fiorentina	30	(0)
2018	→ L.F. Jesina (loan)	0	(0)
2020–2021	→ Hellas Verona (loan)	22	(0)
2021–2026	Inter Milan	48	(0)
2024–2025	→ Fiorentina (loan)	3	(0)
2025–2026	→ Lazio (loan)	21	(0)
2026–	Como 1907	0	(0)

International career^{‡}
2015–	Italy	15	(0)
- * Club domestic league appearances and goals as of 17 May 2026 ‡ National team caps and goals as of 1 December 2025

Francesca Durante (born 12 February 1997) is an Italian professional footballer who plays as goalkeeper for Serie A club Como 1907 and the Italy national team.

== Club career ==
On 22 July 2026, Durante joined newly promoted Serie A club Como 1907.

== International career ==
She made her first appearance for Italy on 6 December 2015 in a 2–0 loss against China.

On 26 June 2022, Durante was announced in the Italy squad for the UEFA Women's Euro 2022.

On 2 July 2023, Durante was called up to the 23-player Italy squad for the 2023 FIFA Women's World Cup.

On 25 June 2025, Durante was called up to the Italy squad for the UEFA Women's Euro 2025.

== Honours ==
Fiorentina

- Serie A: 2016–17
- Coppa Italia: 2016–17, 2017–18
- Supercoppa Italiana: 2018

Individual

- Serie A Best Goalkeeper: 2022–23
- Serie A Team of the Season: 2022–23
- AIC Serie A Women's Team of the Year: 2020–21, 2022–23
