= Maria Luisa Filangeri =

Italian footballer (born 2000)

Personal information
- Date of birth: 28 January 2000 (age 26)
- Place of birth: Partinico, Italy
- Height: 1.60 m (5 ft 3 in)
- Position: Defender

Team information
- Current team: Fiorentina
- Number: 85

Senior career*
Years	Team	Apps	(Gls)
2017–2018	Empoli	22	(0)
2018–2019	Florentia	11	(1)
2019–2024	Sassuolo	106	(3)
2024–	Fiorentina	21	(0)

International career
2016–2017	Italy U17		
2018	Italy U19		
2021–	Italy	8	(0)
- * Club domestic league appearances and goals

Maria Luisa Filangeri (born 28 January 2000) is an Italian professional footballer who plays as a defender for Fiorentina, after playing for five years for Sassuolo. She is an international with the Italy national team.

== International career ==
On 26 June 2022, Filangeri was announced in the Italy squad for the UEFA Women's Euro 2022.
