= Elena Linari =

Italian footballer (born 1994)

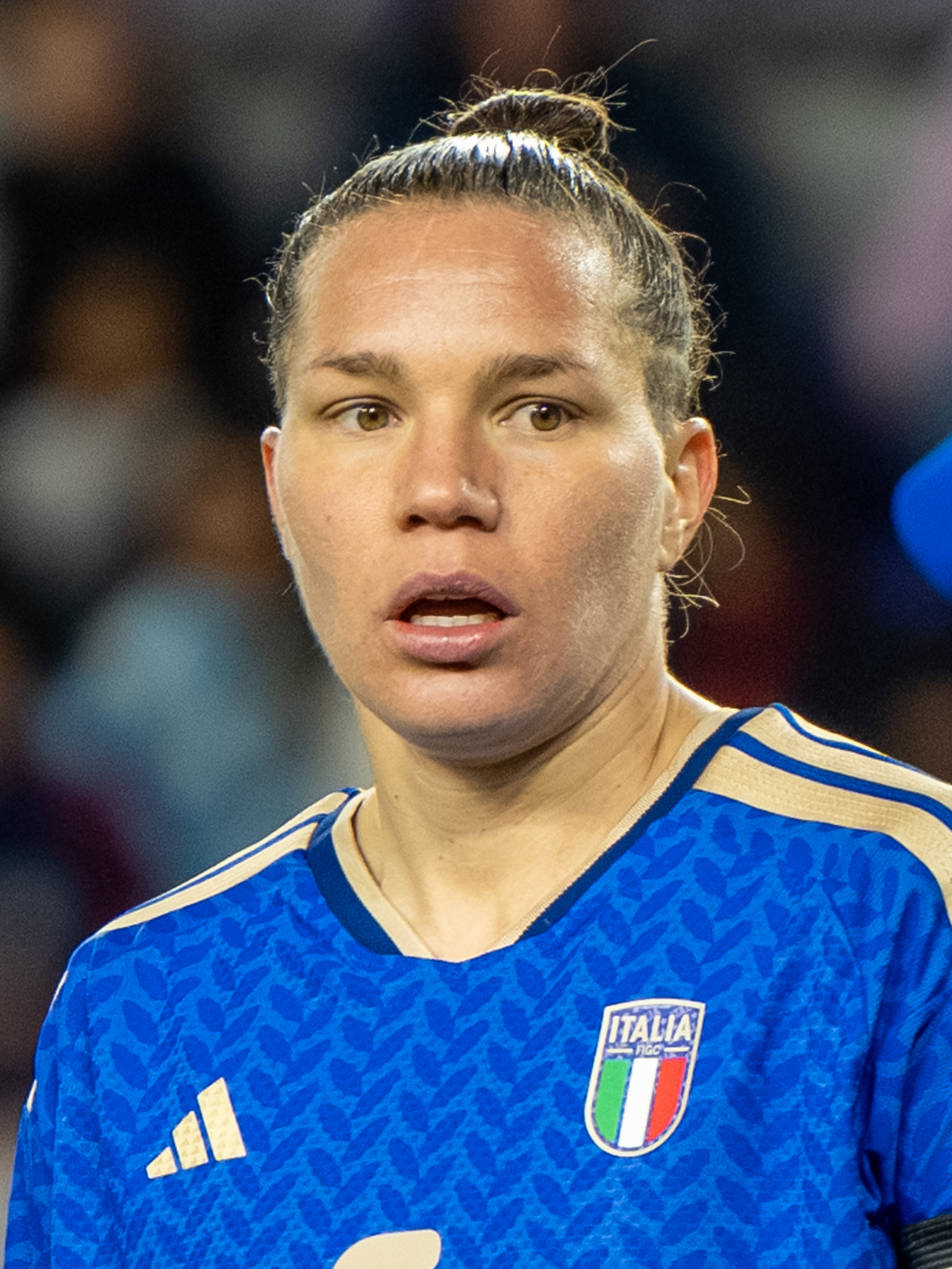
- Linari with Italy in 2025

Personal information
- Date of birth: 15 April 1994 (age 32)
- Place of birth: Fiesole, Italy
- Height: 1.73 m (5 ft 8 in)
- Position: Centre back

Team information
- Current team: London City Lionesses
- Number: 13

Youth career
- Atletica Castello

Senior career*
Years	Team	Apps	(Gls)
2008–2013	Firenze	107	(8)
2013–2016	Brescia	70	(3)
2016–2018	Fiorentina	44	(13)
2018–2020	Atlético Madrid	33	(1)
2020	Bordeaux	3	(0)
2021–2025	Roma	94	(13)
2025–	London City Lionesses	15	(1)

International career^{‡}
2013–	Italy	126	(6)
- * Club domestic league appearances and goals as of 14:45, 20 May 2026 (UTC) ‡ National team caps and goals as of 14:45, 20 May 2026 (UTC)

Elena Linari (Italian: [ˈɛːlena liˈnaːri]; born 15 April 1994) is an Italian professional footballer who plays as a centre back for Women's Super League club London City Lionesses and captains the Italy national team. She has also played for Girondins de Bordeaux, Atlético Madrid, Fiorentina, Brescia and Roma, and she has won four league titles, four cups and two supercups. She has represented Italy internationally since 2013.

== Club career ==
Linari started her youth career with Atletica Castello and played in inter-gender training matches until she moved to Claudio Desolati's football academy in Florence when Linari was fourteen years old. She then played for her region's football club Firenze for five seasons, beginning in the 2008-2009 season and making her Serie A debut at sixteen years of age with the club. Linari would also win a Primavera title with Firenze in the 2012-2013 season.

The Italian defender would make a total 107 appearances for Firenze until Linari moved to Brescia in the summer of 2013. She won more team titles with Brescia, including winning the Serie A league title in her first season with the club. Linari also made her UEFA Champions League debut with Brescia on 9 October 2014. She would later with the Coppa Italia in 2014-15, and win two Supercoppa trophies in 2014 and 2015. In the summer of 2016, Linari decided to return to her home region and play for Fiorentina, which is the club she has supported since she was a child.

Linari would go on to win a league title and two Coppa Italia trophies during her two seasons playing for Fiorentina, before she chose to become the first female Italian football player to sign a professional contract when she signed with Atlético Madrid in the summer of 2018.

During her two-year stay in Spain, Linari won a Liga title and made the cup final with Atletico before moving to France to sign with Bordeaux in 2020. Her brief stay with Bordeaux was not successful, and Linari the offer to return to her native Italy and play with Roma from January 2021 onwards.

On 14 January 2021, she joined AS Roma on a free transfer and signed a contract until June 2021. During Linari's first six months of playing for Roma, the team's goal-concession rate dropped from 1.21 goals conceded per game to 0.88 goals conceded per game. Linari's arrival is widely credited with re-installing Roma's belief in their long-term goals as well as helping lead Roma to the club's first major trophy in the women's side of the game.

On 30 May 2021, the Italian defender racked up 16 ball recoveries, completed 111 passes and won 5 aerial duels for Roma in their 2021 Coppa Italia final victory over AC Milan. That victory resulted in the fourth Coppa Italia winner's medal won by Linari in her playing career.

On 1 August 2025, Linari signed for London City Lionesses in the Women's Super League.

== International career ==
Linari was called up to the Italy squad for the UEFA Women's Euro 2017.

Linari was called up to the Italy squad for the 2019 FIFA Women's World Cup.

On 26 June 2022, Linari was announced in the Italy squad for the UEFA Women's Euro 2022.

On 2 July 2023, Linari was called up to the 23-player Italy squad for the 2023 FIFA Women's World Cup.

On 25 June 2025, Linari was called up to the Italy squad for the UEFA Women's Euro 2025.

== Career statistics ==
=== Club ===
As of match played 16 May 2026

Appearances and goals by club, season and competition
Club	Season	League			National cup (Note: Includes Coppa Italia, Coupe de France féminine, Copa de la Reina, Women's FA Cup)		League cup (Note: Includes Women's League Cup)		Continental (Note: includes UEFA Women's Champions League)		Other (Note: includes Supercoppa Italiana)		Total	
Club	Season	Division	Apps	Goals	Apps	Goals	Apps	Goals	Apps	Goals	Apps	Goals	Apps	Goals
Firenze	2008–09	Serie A2	19	2	?	?	—		—		—		19	2
Firenze	2009–10	Serie A2	19	1	?	?	—		—		—		19	1
Firenze	2010–11	Serie A	17	1	?	?	—		—		—		17	1
Firenze	2011–12	Serie A	24	2	?	?	—		—		—		24	2
Firenze	2012–13	Serie A	28	2	?	?	—		—		—		28	2
Firenze	Total		107	8	?	?	0	0	0	0	0	0	107	8
Brescia	2013–14	Serie A	29	2	3	0	—		—		—		32	2
Brescia	2014–15	Serie A	22	0	4	0	—		1	0	1	0	28	0
Brescia	2015–16	Serie A	19	1	4	1	—		6	0	1	0	30	2
Brescia	Total		70	3	11	1	0	0	7	0	2	0	90	4
Fiorentina	2016–17	Serie A	22	5	4	1	—		—		—		26	6
Fiorentina	2017–18	Serie A	22	8	4	1	—		4	0	1	0	30	7
Fiorentina	Total		44	13	8	2	0	0	4	0	1	0	56	13
Atlético Madrid	2018–19	Primera División	16	1	2	0	—		4	0	—		22	1
Atlético Madrid	2019–20	Primera División	17	0	1	0	—		3	0	—		21	0
Atlético Madrid	Total		33	1	3	0	0	0	7	0	0	0	43	1
Bordeaux	2020–21	D1 Féminine	3	0	0	0	—		—		—		3	0
Roma	2020–21	Serie A	11	2	2	0	—		—		—		13	2
Roma	2021–22	Serie A	19	1	7	0	—		—		0	0	26	1
Roma	2022–23	Serie A	20	1	5	0	—		10	2	1	0	36	3
Roma	2023–24	Serie A	22	7	4	1	—		8	0	1	0	35	8
Roma	2024–25	Serie A	22	2	2	1	—		7	1	1	0	32	4
Roma	Total		94	13	20	2	0	0	25	3	3	0	142	18
London City Lionnesses	2025–26	Women's Super League	15	1	0	0	1	0	—		—		16	1
Career total			366	39	42	3	1	0	43	3	6	0	458	45

=== International ===
As of match played 7 March 2026

Appearances and goals by national team and year
National team	Year	Apps	Goals
Italy	2013	1	0
Italy	2014	6	0
Italy	2015	5	0
Italy	2016	12	0
Italy	2017	12	0
Italy	2018	7	0
Italy	2019	17	1
Italy	2020	4	2
Italy	2021	9	1
Italy	2022	10	0
Italy	2023	15	1
Italy	2024	10	0
Italy	2025	15	1
Italy	2026	2	0
Total		126	6

Scores and results list Italy's goal tally first, score column indicates score after each Linari goal.

List of international goals scored by Elena Linari
No.	Date	Venue	Opponent	Score	Result	Competition
1.	8 November 2019	Stadio Ciro Vigorito, Benevento, Italy	Georgia	1–0	6–0	UEFA Women's Euro 2022 qualifying
2.	4 March 2020	Estádio Algarve, Faro, Portugal	Portugal	1–1	2–1	2020 Algarve Cup
3.	22 September 2020	Bosnia and Herzegovina FA Training Centre, Zenica, Bosnia & Herzegovina	Bosnia and Herzegovina	5–0	5–0	UEFA Women's Euro 2022 qualifying
4.	14 June 2021	Stadion Wiener Neustadt, Vienna, Austria	Austria	3–2	3–2	Friendly
5.	1 December 2023	Estadio Municipal de Pasarón, Pontevedra, Spain	Spain	3–1	3–2	2023–24 UEFA Women's Nations League
6.	3 June 2025	Swansea Stadium, Swansea, Wales	Wales	1–0	4–1	2025 UEFA Women's Nations League

== Honours ==
Brescia

- Serie A: 2013–14, 2015–16
- Coppa Italia: 2015–16
- Supercoppa Italiana: 2014, 2015

Fiorentina

- Serie A: 2016–17
- Coppa Italia: 2016–17, 2017–18

Roma

- Serie A: 2022–23, 2023–24
- Coppa Italia: 2020–21, 2023–24
- Supercoppa Italiana: 2022, 2024

Individual

- Serie A Women's Team of the Year: 2020–21, 2021–22, 2022–23
- UEFA Women's Championship Team of the Tournament: 2025
