= Martina Lenzini =

Italian footballer (born 1998)

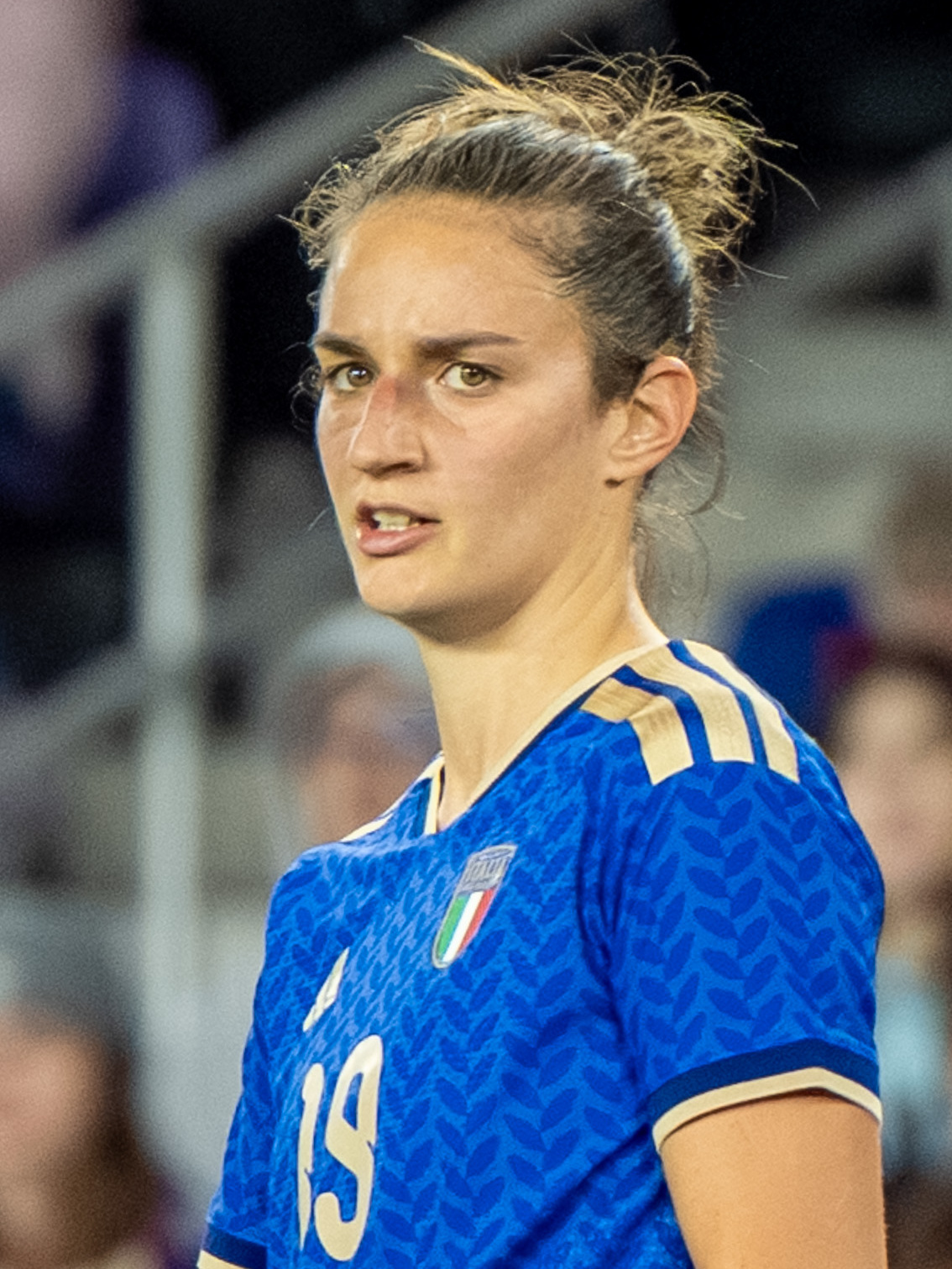
- Lenzini with Italy in 2025

Personal information
- Date of birth: 23 July 1998 (age 28)
- Place of birth: Pavullo nel Frignano, Italy
- Height: 1.73 m (5 ft 8 in)
- Positions: Centre back; right back

Team information
- Current team: Juventus
- Number: 71

Senior career*
Years	Team	Apps	(Gls)
2012–2014	Olimpia Vignola	21	(3)
2014–2017	Brescia	28	(1)
2014–2015	→ Imolese (loan)	18	(2)
2017–	Juventus	105	(1)
2018–2021	→ Sassuolo (loan)	53	(0)

International career^{‡}
2014–2015	Italy U17	6	(0)
2016–2017	Italy U19	10	(0)
2018–2019	Italy U23	2	(0)
2020–	Italy	56	(1)
- * Club domestic league appearances and goals as of 10 May 2026 ‡ National team caps and goals as of 13 October 2026

Martina Lenzini (born 23 July 1998) is an Italian professional footballer who plays as a centre back for Serie A club Juventus FC and the Italy women's national team. Mainly a centre back, Lenzini can also play at right back.

== Club career ==
Lenzini, born in Fanano, started out playing football with her hometown club. In 2012, she moved to Olimpia Vignola.

In 2014, aged just 16, she joined Brescia and spent the 2014–15 season on loan at Imolese. Upon returning to Brescia, Lenzini featured in ten league games to help them win the 2015–16 Serie A title, whilst also winning the Coppa Italia and Supercoppa Italiana. She also made her UEFA Women's Champions League debut in this season, where Brescia reached the quarter-finals.

In 2017, Lenzini joined newly formed club Juventus and helped them win Serie A in their first-ever season. She was loaned out to Sassuolo in 2018 per her own request to gain more regular first-team football experience. Lenzini ended up spending three seasons on loan at Sassuolo and she played in 53 of the club's 66 league matches during that time. In her final season there, the team finished third and just one point away from Champions League qualification.

Lenzini returned to Juventus in the summer of 2021 and immediately established herself as a consistent starter in the side's defence. She played 19 times in the 2021–22 Serie A as Juve were crowned Italian champions. They also won the Coppa Italia, Supercoppa Italia and reached the Champions League quarter-finals.

Lenzini won the 2022–23 Coppa Italia and 2023 Supercoppa Italiana trophies with Juventus, beating Roma in both finals.

On 12 March 2025, Lenzini renewed her contract with Juventus to stay at the club until 2028.

== International career ==
Lenzini represented Italy at under-17, under-19 and under-23 level before making her debut for the senior team in 2020.

On 26 June 2022, Lenzini was announced in the Italy squad for the UEFA Women's Euro 2022.

On 2 July 2023, Lenzini was called up to the 23-player Italy squad for the 2023 FIFA Women's World Cup.

On 25 June 2025, Lenzini was called up to the Italy squad for the UEFA Women's Euro 2025.

== International goals ==
As of match played 13 October 2026

Scores and results list Italy's goal tally first, score column indicates score after each Lenzini goal.

List of international goals scored by Martina Lenzini
No.	Date	Venue	Opponent	Score	Result	Competition
1.	14 April 2026	Dubočica Stadium, Leskovac, Serbia	Serbia	3–0	6–0	2027 FIFA Women's World Cup qualification

== Personal life ==
Lenzini is a Juventus supporter. Speaking about her first game at the Juventus Stadium (a Champions League match against Chelsea on 13 October 2021), she said: "I've always dreamed of playing at that stadium. I was a supporter and I'd go to watch games, and I'd say: 'Who knows? Maybe one day I'll be able to play at this stadium'. Seeing everyone in the stadium, I'd say: 'Martina, you're here!' Four years ago you'd only be watching and now you're on the pitch."

== Honours ==
Brescia

- Serie A: 2015-16
- Coppa Italia: 2015-16
- Supercoppa Italiana: 2016

Juventus

- Serie A: 2017–18, 2021–22, 2024–25
- Coppa Italia: 2021–22, 2022–23, 2024–25
- Supercoppa Italiana: 2021, 2023, 2025
- Serie A Women's Cup: 2025, 2026

Individual

- Serie A Team of the Season: 2023–24, 2024–25
- AIC Serie A Women's Team of the Year: 2021–22, 2023–24
