= Emilie Haavi =

Norwegian footballer (born 1992)

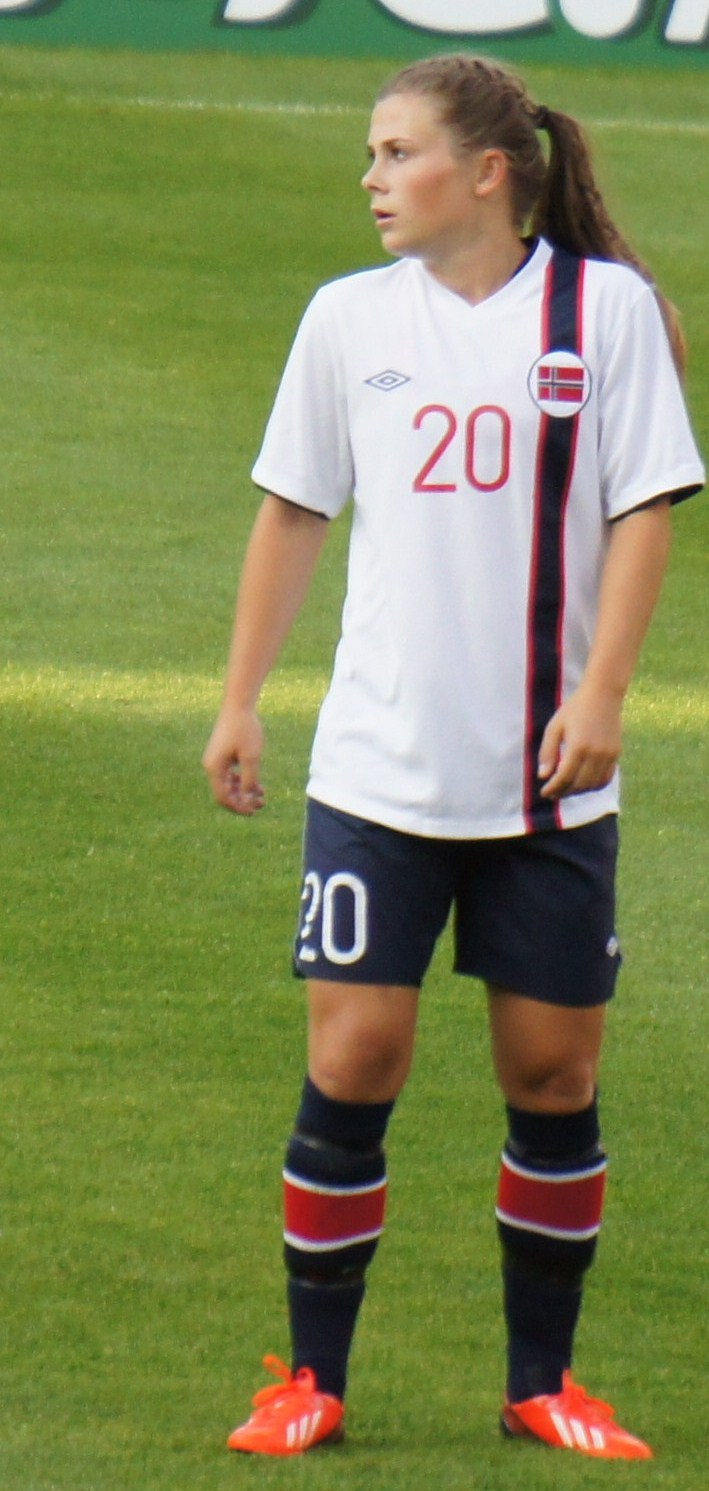
- Haavi representing Norway in 2013

Personal information
- Full name: Emilie Bosshard Haavi
- Date of birth: 16 June 1992 (age 34)
- Place of birth: Bærum, Norway
- Height: 1.64 m (5 ft 5 in)
- Positions: Attacking midfielder; winger

Team information
- Current team: Como 1907
- Number: 7

Youth career
- Stabæk

Senior career*
Years	Team	Apps	(Gls)
2008–2012	Røa	74	(40)
2013–2016	LSK Kvinner	84	(50)
2017	Boston Breakers	7	(0)
2017–2021	LSK Kvinner	77	(30)
2021–2026	Roma	91	(19)
2026–	Como 1907	0	(0)

International career^{‡}
2010–	Norway	101	(16)
Medal record
Women's football
Representing Norway
UEFA Women's Championship
Silver medal – second place	2013 Sweden	Team
- * Club domestic league appearances and goals as of 21:34, 29 November 2025 (UTC) ‡ National team caps and goals as of 10:10, 26 September 2023 (UTC)

Emilie Bosshard Haavi (Danish: [ɛ.miˈliː.ə ˈbɔs.hɑːrd ˈhɑː.vi]; born 16 June 1992) is a Norwegian professional footballer who plays as an attacking midfielder or winger for Italian Serie A Women club Como 1907 and the Norway national team.

Haavi was according to Fjordabladet, elected Player of the Year in 2020 Toppserien.

== Club career ==
She has played in the Toppserien, the top division in Norway, for Røa from 2008 to 2012 and for LSK Kvinner from 2013 to 2016.

On 31 October 2016, she signed with the Boston Breakers of the NWSL. In August 2017, Boston Breakers waived Haavi in a mutual agreements to allow her to return to Norway due to homesickness. On 15 August it was announced that Haavi was returning to her former club, LSK Kvinner.

On 15 December 2021, Haavi joined AS Roma. The following season she won her first Italian "Scudetto" (Serie A Championship) and was elected MVP of the season, while she had a back-to-back Scudetto win on the 2023-24 season.

== International career ==
She made her debut for the Norway women's national football team in 2010, and appeared at the 2011 World Cup in Germany, scoring a goal in the group stage against Equatorial Guinea on 29 June. She also played in the qualifying stages for the 2011 UEFA Women's Under-19 Championship, but wasn't called up to the finals due to her commitment with the senior side. Veteran national coach Even Pellerud selected Haavi in Norway's squad for UEFA Women's Euro 2013 campaign in Sweden. In the final at Friends Arena, she was an unused substitute as Norway lost 1–0 to Germany. She was also selected for the 2015 FIFA Women's World Cup.

On 19 June 2023, she was included in the 23-player Norwegian squad for the 2023 FIFA Women's World Cup.

== Career statistics ==
=== Club ===
As of match played 17 September 2023

Appearances and goals by club, season and competition
Club	Season	League			Cup (Note: Includes Norwegian Women's Cup, Coppa Italia)		Continental (Note: Includes UEFA Women's Champions League)		Others (Note: Includes Supercoppa Italiana)		Total	
Club	Season	Division	Apps	Goals	Apps	Goals	Apps	Goals	Apps	Goals	Apps	Goals
Røa	2008	Toppserien	8	0	0	0	—		—		8	0
Røa	2009	Toppserien	13	4	0	0	4	1	—		17	5
Røa	2010	Toppserien	18	15	0	0	3	0	—		21	15
Røa	2011	Toppserien	21	16	3	3	—		—		24	19
Røa	2012	Toppserien	14	5	3	2	3	2	—		20	9
Røa	Total		74	40	6	5	10	3	—		90	48
LSK Kvinner	2013	Toppserien	19	12	3	0	2	1	—		24	13
LSK Kvinner	2014	Toppserien	22	16	5	4	—		—		27	20
LSK Kvinner	2015	Toppserien	22	9	4	3	3	0	—		29	12
LSK Kvinner	2016	Toppserien	21	13	5	8	2	1	—		28	22
LSK Kvinner	Total		84	50	17	15	7	2	—		108	67
Boston Breakers	2017	NWSL	7	0	0	0	—		—		7	0
LSK Kvinner	2017	Toppserien	9	3	2	0	4	1	—		15	4
LSK Kvinner	2018	Toppserien	22	7	5	3	4	2	—		31	12
LSK Kvinner	2019	Toppserien	10	2	1	0	2	0	—		13	2
LSK Kvinner	2020	Toppserien	18	5	4	2	2	1	—		24	8
LSK Kvinner	2021	Toppserien	18	13	4	2	2	0	—		24	15
LSK Kvinner	Total		77	30	16	7	14	4	—		107	41
AS Roma	2021–22	Serie A	6	3	4	2	0	0	1	0	11	5
AS Roma	2022–23	Serie A	25	8	3	0	12	2	1	0	41	10
AS Roma	2023–24	Serie A	1	1	0	0	0	0	0	0	1	1
AS Roma	Total		32	12	7	2	12	2	2	0	53	16
Career total			274	132	46	29	43	11	2	0	365	172

=== International ===
As of match played 5 August 2023

Appearances and goals by national team and year
National team	Year	Apps	Goals
Norway	2010	6	4
Norway	2011	8	1
Norway	2012	5	0
Norway	2013	4	0
Norway	2014	10	2
Norway	2015	14	7
Norway	2016	12	1
Norway	2017	7	0
Norway	2018	10	0
Norway	2019	7	1
Norway	2020	0	0
Norway	2021	7	0
Norway	2022	4	0
Norway	2023	7	0
Total		101	16

Scores and results list Norway's goal tally first, score column indicates score after each Haavi goal.

List of international goals scored by Emilie Haavi
No.	Date	Venue	Opponent	Score	Result	Competition	Ref.
1.	23 June 2010	Skagerak Arena, Skien, Norway	Belarus	3–0	3–0	2011 FIFA Women's World Cup qualification	
2.	21 August 2010	NTC Senec, Senec, Slovakia	Slovakia	3–0	4–0	2011 FIFA Women's World Cup qualification	
3.	25 August 2010	Goce Delčev Stadium, Prilep, Macedonia	North Macedonia	1–0	7–0	2011 FIFA Women's World Cup qualification	
4.	25 August 2010	Goce Delčev Stadium, Prilep, Macedonia	North Macedonia	5–0	7–0	2011 FIFA Women's World Cup qualification	
5.	29 June 2011	Impuls Arena, Augsburg, Germany	Equatorial Guinea	1–0	1–0	2011 FIFA Women's World Cup	
6.	14 June 2014	Brann Stadion, Bergen, Norway	Greece	6–0	6–0	2015 FIFA Women's World Cup qualification	
7.	13 September 2014	Niko Dovana Stadium, Durrës, Albania	Albania	9–0	11–0	2015 FIFA Women's World Cup qualification	
8.	6 March 2015	Estádio Municipal, Lagos, Portugal	Iceland	1–0	1–0	2015 Algarve Cup	
9.	8 April 2015	Strømmen Stadion, Strømmen, Norway	Netherlands	1–0	2–3	Friendly	
10.	8 April 2015	Strømmen Stadion, Strømmen, Norway	Netherlands	2–2	2–3	Friendly	
11.	23 May 2015	Stayen Stadium, Sint-Truiden, Belgium	Belgium	1–1	2–3	Friendly	
12.	17 September 2015	Firhill Stadium, Glasgow, Scotland	Scotland	1–0	4–0	Friendly	
13.	22 September 2015	Kazhymukan Munaitpasov Stadium, Astana, Kazakhstan	Kazakhstan	3–0	4–0	UEFA Women's Euro 2017 qualifying	
14.	22 September 2015	Kazhymukan Munaitpasov Stadium, Astana, Kazakhstan	Kazakhstan	4–0	4–0	UEFA Women's Euro 2017 qualifying	
15.	5 March 2016	Het Kasteel, Rotterdam, Netherlands	Netherlands	1–0	4–1	2016 UEFA Women's Olympic Qualifying Tournament	
16.	1 March 2019	Albufeira Municipal Stadium, Albufeira, Portugal	China	3–0	3–1	2019 Algarve Cup	

== Honours ==
Røa IL

- Toppserien: 2009, 2010, 2011
- Norwegian Women's Cup: 2008, 2009, 2010

LSK Kvinner

- Toppserien: 2014, 2015, 2016, 2017, 2018, 2019
- Norwegian Women's Cup: 2014, 2015, 2016, 2018, 2019

Roma

- Serie A: 2022–23, 2023–24
- Supercoppa Italiana: 2022

Norway

- UEFA Women's Championship runner-up: 2013

Individual

- Serie A Women Most Valuable Player: 2022–23
- Serie A Women's Team of the Year: 2022–23

== See also ==
- List of women's footballers with 100 or more international caps
