= Flaminia Simonetti =

Italian footballer (born 1997)

Personal information
- Date of birth: 17 February 1997 (age 29)
- Place of birth: Rome, Italy
- Height: 1.54 m (5 ft 1 in)
- Position: Midfielder

Team information
- Current team: Como
- Number: 20

Senior career*
| Years | Team | Apps | (Gls) |
| 2011–2012 | Roma CF | 2 | (0) |
| 2012–2016 | Roma | 64+ | (4+) |
| 2016 | FC Neunkirch | 0 | (0) |
| 2016–2019 | Roma | 57 | (11) |
| 2019–2020 | → Empoli (loan) | 15 | (3) |
| 2020–2024 | Inter | 70 | (6) |
| 2024–2026 | Lazio | 42 | (4) |
| 2026– | Como | | |

International career^{‡}
| 2021–2022 | Italy | 6 | (0) |
- * Club domestic league appearances and goals as of 21 September 2026 ‡ National team caps and goals as of 21 September 2026

Flaminia Simonetti (born 17 February 1997) is an Italian professional footballer who plays as a midfielder for Serie A club Como. She has been capped for the Italy women's national team.

== Career ==
=== Club career ===
At the age of 14, Simonetti debuted for Italian side Roma CF. In 2016, she signed for FC Neunkirch in Switzerland but left after a few days due to homesickness. After that, she signed for Italian club Roma.

=== International career ===
Simonetti represented Italy at the UEFA Women's Euro 2022.

== Personal life ==
She is the sister of footballer Pier Luigi Simonetti.
