= 2022–23 Serie A (women) =

56th season of top women's football (soccer) league in Italy

Serie A (women)
- Season: 2022–23
- Dates: 27 August 2022 – 28 May 2023
- Champions: Roma; 1st title
- Relegated: Parma
- Champions League: Roma; Juventus
- Matches: 130
- Goals: 431 (3.32 per match)
- Top goalscorer: Tabitha Chawinga (23)

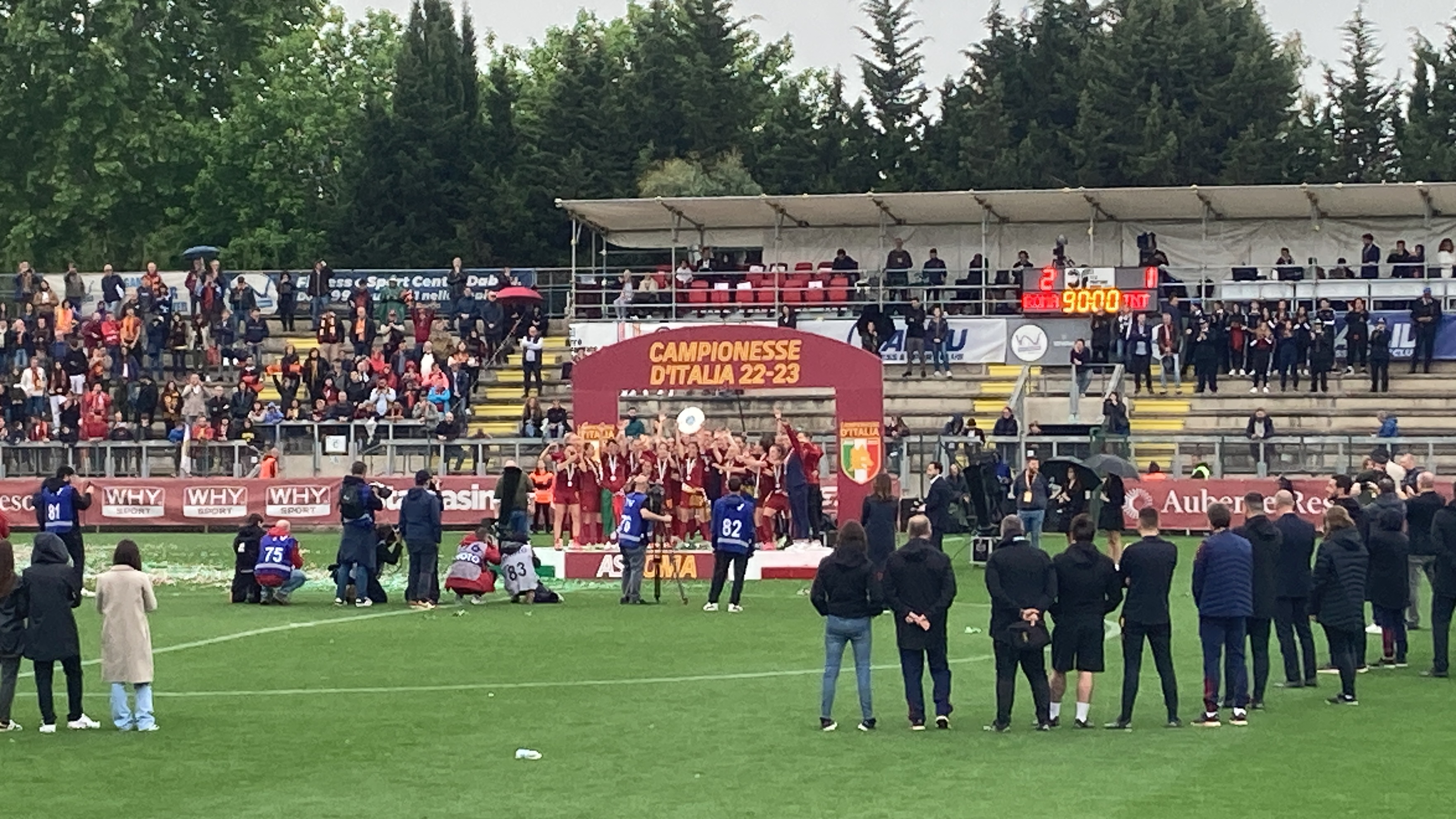
Cerimonia di premiazione scudetto Roma femminile

The 2022–23 Serie A was the 56th season of the women's football top-level league in Italy, and the first season to be fully professional.

== Summary ==
=== Changes ===
Compared to the 2021–22 season, the number of participating teams decreased from 12 to 10. Indeed, from the 2021–22 Serie A, Napoli, Lazio and Verona were relegated to Serie B, while from the 2021–22 Serie B only Como was promoted.

Empoli was disbanded and the berth left was taken by the newly formed Parma.

=== Format ===
The Serie A became fully-professional from the 2022–23 season, removing the salary cap and allowing teams to pay their players a higher wage. Women's footballers became the first female athletes in Italy to be fully professional.

With the reduction of the participating teams, the format of the competition also changed. The season takes place in two phases: in the first phase, the 10 participating teams face each other in a round-robin tournament with home and away matches for a total of 18 matchdays. In the second phase the top-five ranked teams qualify to the championship round (poule scudetto), while the last-five ranked teams play the relegation round. Each team starts in the second phase with the points earned during the first phase. In both rounds, the five participating teams face each other in a round-robin tournament with home and away matches for a total of an additional 10 matchdays, with two rest sessions for each team. At the end of the second phase, the first ranked in the championship round is crowned champion of Italy and qualifies to the 2023–24 UEFA Women's Champions League alongside the second placed team. In the relegation round the last-ranked team is relegated directly to the Serie B, while the second-last team plays the second-placed in the Serie B for a place in the 2023–24 Serie A.

== Teams ==
=== Team changes ===
Promoted from 2021–22 Serie B	Relegated from 2021–22 Serie A
Como	Napoli; Lazio; Verona

=== Stadiums and locations ===
Locations of the 2022–23 Serie A teams

Team	Home city	Stadium	2021–22 season
Como	Como	Stadio Ferruccio (Seregno)	1st in Serie B
Fiorentina	Florence	Stadio Gino Bozzi	7th in Serie A
Inter Milan	Milan	Suning Training Center in memory of Giacinto Facchetti	5th in Serie A
Juventus	Turin	Juventus Center (Vinovo)	Champions
AC Milan	Milan	Centro Sportivo Vismara	3rd in Serie A
Parma	Parma	Stadio Ennio Tardini	9th in Serie A (Note: As S.S.D. Empoli Ladies FBC)
Pomigliano	Pomigliano	Stadio Ugo Gobbato	8th in Serie A
Roma	Rome	Stadio Tre Fontane	2nd in Serie A
Sampdoria	Genoa	Campo sportivo Riccardo Garrone (Bogliasco)	6th in Serie A
Sassuolo	Sassuolo	Stadio Enzo Ricci	4th in Serie A

== First phase ==
=== League table ===
Pos	Team	Pld	W	D	L	GF	GA	GD	Pts	Qualification or relegation
1	Roma	18	16	0	2	43	12	+31	48	Qualification for the championship round
2	Juventus	18	12	4	2	46	17	+29	40	Qualification for the championship round
3	Inter Milan	18	10	5	3	45	20	+25	35	Qualification for the championship round
4	AC Milan	18	11	1	6	38	27	+11	34	Qualification for the championship round
5	Fiorentina	18	11	1	6	30	30	0	34	Qualification for the championship round
6	Sassuolo	18	4	5	9	18	28	−10	17	Qualification for the relegation round
7	Pomigliano	18	4	2	12	14	31	−17	14	Qualification for the relegation round
8	Parma	18	3	4	11	18	41	−23	13	Qualification for the relegation round
9	Como	18	2	5	11	18	35	−17	11	Qualification for the relegation round
10	Sampdoria	18	3	1	14	9	38	−29	10	Qualification for the relegation round

Source: FIGC
Rules for classification: 1) Points; 2) Head-to-head points; 3) Goal difference; 4) Number of goals scored; 5) Head-to-head goal difference; 6) Head-to-head away goals scored

=== Results ===
Home \ Away	COM	FIO	INT	JUV	MIL	PAR	POM	ROM	SAM	SAS
Como	—	2–3	1–3	0–6	0–4	4–1	0–1	0–1	0–1	2–2
Fiorentina	2–1	—	0–0	0–3	1–6	2–1	2–0	1–7	2–1	2–0
Inter Milan	1–1	3–1	—	0–2	4–0	4–1	6–1	1–2	4–0	3–0
Juventus	1–1	2–0	3–3	—	1–2	2–1	3–0	1–0	5–0	1–1
Milan	3–3	1–3	1–4	4–3	—	2–0	1–0	0–2	2–1	3–1
Parma	1–0	0–4	2–2	1–2	0–4	—	1–3	2–3	3–1	2–1
Pomigliano	2–2	0–1	1–2	1–2	2–1	0–0	—	0–2	1–0	0–2
Roma	1–0	2–1	3–2	2–4	2–0	5–0	2–0	—	2–0	5–0
Sampdoria	0–1	1–4	0–2	0–4	0–3	0–0	2–1	0–1	—	0–2
Sassuolo	2–0	0–1	1–1	1–1	0–1	2–2	2–1	0–1	1–2	—

Source: FIGC
Legend: Blue = home team win; Yellow = draw; Red = away team win.

== Second phase ==
=== Championship round ===
Pos	Team	Pld	W	D	L	GF	GA	GD	Pts	Qualification or relegation	ROM	JUV	MIL	FIO	INT
1	Roma (C)	26	22	1	3	68	26	+42	67	Qualification for the Champions League second round	—	3–2	3–1	2–1	2–1
2	Juventus	26	16	6	4	69	35	+34	54	Qualification for the Champions League first round	5–2	—	2–0	4–3	2–2
3	AC Milan	26	13	5	8	52	42	+10	44		2–2	3–3	—	3–3	3–1
4	Fiorentina	26	13	3	10	44	51	−7	42		1–5	4–2	1–1	—	1–0
5	Inter Milan	26	11	6	9	55	38	+17	39		1–6	1–3	0–1	4–0	—

Source: FIGC
Rules for classification: 1) Points; 2) Head-to-head points; 3) Goal difference; 4) Number of goals scored; 5) Head-to-head goal difference; 6) Head-to-head away goals scored
(C) Champions

=== Relegation round ===
Pos	Team	Pld	W	D	L	GF	GA	GD	Pts	Qualification or relegation	SAS	COM	SAM	POM	PAR
1	Sassuolo	26	11	5	10	36	36	0	38		—	2–1	3–0	2–0	5–4
2	Como	26	6	7	13	30	44	−14	25		2–1	—	2–1	0–1	1–0
3	Sampdoria	26	6	3	17	23	50	−27	21		0–2	1–1	—	4–1	3–0
4	Pomigliano (Q)	26	6	3	17	26	49	−23	21	Qualification for the relegation play-offs	1–2	1–3	2–4	—	4–1
5	Parma (R)	26	3	7	16	28	60	−32	16	Relegation to Serie B	0–1	2–2	1–1	2–2	—

Source: FIGC
Rules for classification: 1) Points; 2) Head-to-head points; 3) Goal difference; 4) Number of goals scored; 5) Head-to-head goal difference; 6) Head-to-head away goals scored
(Q) Qualified for the phase indicated; (R) Relegated

== Relegation play-offs ==
=== First leg ===
3 June 2023
16:30

Lazio	0–2	Pomigliano
	Report	Martínez 32', 90+6'

Centro sportivo di Formello, Rome
Referee: Luca De Angeli (Milan)

=== Second leg ===
8 June 2023
16:30

Pomigliano	0–1	Lazio
	Report	Golob 43' (o.g.)

Stadio Comunale di Palma Campania, Palma Campania
Referee: Marco Emmanuele (Pisa)

== Season statistics ==
=== Top scorers ===
As of 25 May 2023

Rank	Player	Club	Goals
1	(Malawi) Tabitha Chawinga	Inter Milan	23
2	(Italy) Cristiana Girelli	Juventus	15
3	(Italy) Valentina Giacinti	Roma	13
3	(Italy) Martina Piemonte	AC Milan	13
5	(Brazil) Andressa	Roma	12
5	(Italy) Elisa Polli	Inter Milan	12
7	(Netherlands) Lineth Beerensteyn	Juventus	11
8	(Scotland) Lana Clelland	Sassuolo	10
9	(Sweden) Kosovare Asllani	AC Milan	9
10	(Italy) Barbara Bonansea	Juventus	8
10	(Italy) Agnese Bonfantini	Sampdoria	8
10	(Norway) Emilie Haavi	Roma	8
10	(Spain) Veronica Boquete	Fiorentina	8
14	(Italy) Sofia Cantore	Juventus	7
14	(Norway) Sophie Román Haug	Roma	7
14	(Hungary) Zsanett Kaján	Fiorentina	7
14	(Brazil) Taty	Pomigliano	7

== Awards ==
=== Seasonal awards ===
Award	Winner	Club	Ref.
Most Valuable Player	(Norway) Emilie Haavi	Roma	
Best Young Player	(Italy) Chiara Beccari	Como	
Best Goalkeeper	(Italy) Francesca Durante	Inter Milan	
Best Defender	(Italy) Elena Linari	Roma	
Best Midfielder	(Canada) Julia Grosso	Juventus	
Best Forward	(Malawi) Tabitha Chawinga	Inter Milan	

Team of the Season
Goalkeeper	(Italy) Francesca Durante (Inter Milan)			
Defenders	(Denmark) Caroline Pleidrup (Sassuolo)	(Italy) Elena Linari (Roma)		(Japan) Moeka Minami (Roma)
Midfielders	(Brazil) Andressa Alves (Roma)	(Canada) Julia Grosso (Juventus)	(Italy) Giada Greggi (Roma)	(Spain) Vero Boquete (Fiorentina)
Forwards	(Italy) Valentina Giacinti (Roma)	(Malawi) Tabitha Chawinga (Inter Milan)		(Norway) Emilie Haavi (Roma)
