= UEFA Women's Euro 2025 knockout stage =

Football tournament

The UEFA Women's Euro 2025 knockout stage was the second and final stage of the UEFA Women's Euro 2025 final tournament. It began on 16 July with the quarter-finals and ended on 27 July 2025 with the final.

All times local, CEST (UTC+2).

== Format ==
In the knockout stage, extra time and a penalty shoot-out were used to decide the winner if necessary.

== Qualified teams ==
The top two placed teams from each of the four groups qualified for the knockout stage.

Group	Winners	Runners-up
A	Norway	Switzerland
B	Spain	Italy
C	Sweden	Germany
D	France	England

== Bracket ==
Quarter-finals
17 July – Zurich
Sweden	2 (2)
England (p)	2 (3)
16 July – Geneva
Norway	1
Italy	2
19 July – Basel
France	1 (5)
Germany (p)	1 (6)
18 July – Bern
Spain	2
Switzerland	0

Semi-finals
22 July – Geneva
England (a.e.t.)	2
Italy	1
23 July – Zurich
Germany	0
Spain (a.e.t.)	1

Final
27 July – Basel
England (p)	1 (3)
Spain	1 (1)

== Quarter-finals ==
=== Norway vs Italy ===
16 July 2025
21:00

Norway	1–2	Italy
Hegerberg 66'	Report	Girelli 50', 90'

Stade de Genève, Geneva
Attendance: 26,276
Referee: Stéphanie Frappart (France)

Norway	Italy

GK	1	Cecilie Fiskerstrand
RB	13	Thea Bjelde		(substituted off) 87'
CB	6	Maren Mjelde
CB	4	Tuva Hansen
LB	11	Guro Reiten
CM	21	Lisa Naalsund	(yellow card) 23'
CM	18	Frida Maanum		(substituted off) 64'
CM	7	Ingrid Syrstad Engen
RF	10	Caroline Graham Hansen
CF	14	Ada Hegerberg (c)
LF	22	Signe Gaupset
Substitutions:
MF	19	Elisabeth Terland		(substituted in) 64'
DF	3	Emilie Woldvik		(substituted in) 87'
Manager:
(England) Gemma Grainger

GK	1	Laura Giuliani
CB	3	Lucia Di Guglielmo
CB	23	Cecilia Salvai
CB	5	Elena Linari	(yellow card) 58'
RM	2	Elisabetta Oliviero
CM	18	Arianna Caruso
CM	6	Manuela Giugliano
CM	8	Emma Severini		(substituted off) 77'
LM	11	Barbara Bonansea		(substituted off) 77'
CF	10	Cristiana Girelli (c)		(substituted off) 90+2'
CF	7	Sofia Cantore		(substituted off) 90+2'
Substitutions:
MF	20	Giada Greggi		(substituted in) 77'
FW	21	Michela Cambiaghi		(substituted in) 77'
DF	19	Martina Lenzini		(substituted in) 90+2'
FW	9	Martina Piemonte		(substituted in) 90+2'
Manager:
Andrea Soncin			(yellow card) 59'

Player of the Match:
Cristiana Girelli (Italy)

Assistant referees:
Camille Soriano (France)
Susanne Küng (Switzerland)
Fourth official:
Désirée Grundbacher (Switzerland)
Reserve assistant referee:
Linda Schmid (Switzerland)
Video assistant referee:
Willy Delajod (France)
Assistant video assistant referee:
Fedayi San (Switzerland)
Tiago Martins (Portugal)

=== Sweden vs England ===
17 July 2025
21:00

Sweden	2–2 (a.e.t.)	England
Asllani 2'; Blackstenius 25'	Report	Bronze 79'; Agyemang 81'
Penalties
Angeldahl (penalty missed); Zigiotti Olme (penalty scored); Eriksson (penalty missed); Björn (penalty scored); Falk (penalty missed); Jakobsson (penalty missed); Holmberg (penalty missed)	2–3	(penalty scored) Russo; (penalty missed) James; (penalty missed) Mead; (penalty missed) Greenwood; (penalty scored) Kelly; (penalty missed) Clinton; (penalty scored) Bronze

Stadion Letzigrund, Zurich
Attendance: 22,397
Referee: Marta Huerta de Aza (Spain)

Sweden	England

GK	12	Jennifer Falk
RB	4	Hanna Lundkvist		(substituted off) 61'
CB	14	Nathalie Björn
CB	6	Magdalena Eriksson
LB	2	Jonna Andersson		(substituted off) 106'
CM	16	Filippa Angeldahl
CM	9	Kosovare Asllani (c)		(substituted off) 77'
CM	15	Julia Zigiotti Olme	(yellow card) 89'
RF	19	Johanna Rytting Kaneryd		(substituted off) 106'
CF	11	Stina Blackstenius		(substituted off) 117'
LF	18	Fridolina Rolfö		(substituted off) 77'
Substitutions:
DF	22	Smilla Holmberg		(substituted in) 61'
FW	8	Lina Hurtig		(substituted in) 77'
MF	7	Madelen Janogy		(substituted in) 77'
MF	10	Sofia Jakobsson		(substituted in) 106'
DF	5	Amanda Nildén		(substituted in) 106'
FW	23	Rebecka Blomqvist		(substituted in) 117'
Manager:
Peter Gerhardsson

GK	1	Hannah Hampton
RB	2	Lucy Bronze
CB	6	Leah Williamson (c)		(substituted off) 106'
CB	16	Jess Carter		(substituted off) 70'
LB	5	Alex Greenwood
CM	10	Ella Toone		(substituted off) 70'
CM	4	Keira Walsh		(substituted off) 104'
CM	8	Georgia Stanway		(substituted off) 70'
RF	7	Lauren James
CF	23	Alessia Russo
LF	11	Lauren Hemp		(substituted off) 78'
Substitutions:
FW	9	Beth Mead		(substituted in) 70'
DF	15	Esme Morgan		(substituted in) 70'
FW	17	Michelle Agyemang	(yellow card) 87'	(substituted in) 70'
FW	18	Chloe Kelly	(yellow card) 90'	(substituted in) 78'
MF	14	Grace Clinton		(substituted in) 104'
DF	3	Niamh Charles		(substituted in) 106'
Manager:
(Netherlands) Sarina Wiegman

Player of the Match:
Hannah Hampton (England)

Assistant referees:
Guadalupe Porras Ayuso (Spain)
Eliana Fernández (Spain)
Fourth official:
Frida Klarlund (Denmark)
Reserve assistant referee:
Fie Bruun (Denmark)
Video assistant referee:
Guillermo Cuadra Fernández (Spain)
Assistant video assistant referee:
Dennis Higler (Netherlands)
Christian Dingert (Germany)

=== Spain vs Switzerland ===
18 July 2025
21:00

Spain	2–0	Switzerland
Athenea 66'; Pina 71'	Report

Stadion Wankdorf, Bern
Attendance: 29,734
Referee: Maria Sole Ferrieri Caputi (Italy)

Spain	Switzerland

GK	13	Cata Coll
RB	2	Ona Batlle
CB	4	Irene Paredes (c)
CB	14	Laia Aleixandri	(yellow card) 25'
LB	7	Olga Carmona		(substituted off) 62'
CM	6	Aitana Bonmatí
CM	12	Patricia Guijarro
CM	11	Alexia Putellas		(substituted off) 90'
RF	8	Mariona Caldentey		(substituted off) 62'
CF	9	Esther González		(substituted off) 77'
LF	20	Clàudia Pina		(substituted off) 77'
Substitutions:
DF	15	Leila Ouahabi		(substituted in) 62'
MF	10	Athenea del Castillo		(substituted in) 62'
MF	19	Vicky López		(substituted in) 77'
FW	18	Salma Paralluelo		(substituted in) 77'
FW	17	Lucía García		(substituted in) 90'
Manager:
Montse Tomé

GK	12	Livia Peng
CB	18	Viola Calligaris
CB	13	Lia Wälti (c)	(yellow card) 72'
CB	5	Noelle Maritz	(red card) 90+2'
RWB	19	Iman Beney		(substituted off) 90'
LWB	8	Nadine Riesen		(substituted off) 74'
CM	6	Géraldine Reuteler
CM	4	Noemi Ivelj		(substituted off) 62'
CM	14	Smilla Vallotto		(substituted off) 90'
CF	9	Ana-Maria Crnogorčević	(yellow card) 83'
CF	22	Sydney Schertenleib		(substituted off) 90'
Substitutions:
FW	20	Alayah Pilgrim	(yellow card) 64'	(substituted in) 62'
FW	3	Leila Wandeler		(substituted in) 74'
MF	7	Riola Xhemaili		(substituted in) 90'
FW	23	Alisha Lehmann		(substituted in) 90'
FW	10	Meriame Terchoun		(substituted in) 90'
Other disciplinary actions:
TS	—	Caroline Abbé	(yellow card) 71'
Manager:
(Sweden) Pia Sundhage

Player of the Match:
Aitana Bonmatí (Spain)

Assistant referees:
Francesca Di Monte (Italy)
Emily Carney (England)
Fourth official:
Katalin Kulcsár (Hungary)
Reserve assistant referee:
Anita Vad (Hungary)
Video assistant referee:
Aleandro Di Paolo (Italy)
Assistant video assistant referee:
Sian Massey-Ellis (England)
Jarred Gillett (England)

=== France vs Germany ===
19 July 2025
21:00

France	1–1 (a.e.t.)	Germany
Geyoro 15' (pen.)	Report	Nüsken 25'
Penalties
Majri (penalty missed); Karchaoui (penalty scored); Malard (penalty scored); Baltimore (penalty scored); Jean-François (penalty scored); N'Dongala (penalty scored); Sombath (penalty missed)	5–6	(penalty scored) Minge; (penalty scored) Dallmann; (penalty scored) Knaak; (penalty missed) Däbritz; (penalty scored) Berger; (penalty scored) Bühl; (penalty scored) Nüsken

St. Jakob-Park, Basel
Attendance: 34,128
Referee: Tess Olofsson (Sweden)

France	Germany

GK	16	Pauline Peyraud-Magnin
RB	5	Élisa De Almeida		(substituted off) 112'
CB	19	Griedge Mbock Bathy (c)		(substituted off) 85'
CB	2	Maëlle Lakrar	(yellow card) 115'
LB	13	Selma Bacha
CM	8	Grace Geyoro		(substituted off) 112'
CM	18	Oriane Jean-François
CM	7	Sakina Karchaoui
RF	20	Delphine Cascarino		(substituted off) 76'
CF	12	Marie-Antoinette Katoto		(substituted off) 76'
LF	11	Kadidiatou Diani	(yellow card) 19'	(substituted off) 67'
Substitutions:
MF	17	Sandy Baltimore		(substituted in) 67'
FW	14	Clara Mateo		(substituted in) 76'
FW	9	Melvine Malard		(substituted in) 76'
DF	4	Alice Sombath		(substituted in) 85'
DF	22	Melween N'Dongala		(substituted in) 112'
MF	10	Amel Majri		(substituted in) 112'
Manager:
Laurent Bonadei

GK	1	Ann-Katrin Berger
CB	3	Kathrin Hendrich	(red card) 13'
CB	6	Janina Minge (c)
CB	4	Rebecca Knaak
RWB	2	Sarai Linder		(substituted off) 20'
LWB	17	Franziska Kett	(yellow card) 101'	(substituted off) 114'
RM	22	Jule Brand	(yellow card) 52'	(substituted off) 120'
CM	20	Elisa Senß		(substituted off) 120'
CM	9	Sjoeke Nüsken	(yellow card) 75'
LM	19	Klara Bühl
CF	18	Giovanna Hoffmann		(substituted off) 98'
Substitutions:
DF	23	Sophia Kleinherne		(substituted in) 20'
FW	11	Lea Schüller		(substituted in) 98'
FW	15	Selina Cerci		(substituted in) 114'
MF	13	Sara Däbritz		(substituted in) 120'
MF	16	Linda Dallmann		(substituted in) 120'
Manager:
Christian Wück			(yellow card) 16'

Player of the Match:
Ann-Katrin Berger (Germany)

Assistant referees:
Almira Spahić (Sweden)
Monica Løkkeberg (Norway)
Fourth official:
Ivana Martinčić (Croatia)
Reserve assistant referee:
Irina Pozdejeva (Lithuania)
Video assistant referee:
Jarred Gillett (England)
Assistant video assistant referee:
Sian Massey-Ellis (England)
Dennis Higler (Netherlands)

== Semi-finals ==
=== England vs Italy ===
22 July 2025
21:00

England	2–1 (a.e.t.)	Italy
Agyemang 90+6'; Kelly 119'	Report	Bonansea 33'

Stade de Genève, Geneva
Attendance: 26,539
Referee: Ivana Martinčić (Croatia)

England	Italy

GK	1	Hannah Hampton
RB	2	Lucy Bronze
CB	6	Leah Williamson (c)		(substituted off) 85'
CB	15	Esme Morgan	(yellow card) 90+2'
LB	5	Alex Greenwood		(substituted off) 120+1'
CM	10	Ella Toone
CM	4	Keira Walsh		(substituted off) 106'
CM	8	Georgia Stanway		(substituted off) 77'
RF	7	Lauren James		(substituted off) 46'
CF	23	Alessia Russo		(substituted off) 85'
LF	11	Lauren Hemp
Substitutions:
FW	9	Beth Mead	(yellow card) 120+4'	(substituted in) 46'
FW	18	Chloe Kelly		(substituted in) 77'
FW	17	Michelle Agyemang		(substituted in) 85'
FW	19	Aggie Beever-Jones		(substituted in) 85'
MF	14	Grace Clinton		(substituted in) 106'
DF	16	Jess Carter		(substituted in) 120+1'
Manager:
(Netherlands) Sarina Wiegman

GK	1	Laura Giuliani	(yellow card) 74'
CB	19	Martina Lenzini		(substituted off) 89'
CB	23	Cecilia Salvai
CB	5	Elena Linari	(yellow card) 88'
RWB	2	Elisabetta Oliviero
LWB	3	Lucia Di Guglielmo
RM	7	Sofia Cantore		(substituted off) 73'
CM	18	Arianna Caruso
CM	6	Manuela Giugliano		(substituted off) 89'
LM	11	Barbara Bonansea		(substituted off) 73'
CF	10	Cristiana Girelli (c)		(substituted off) 64'
Substitutions:
FW	9	Martina Piemonte		(substituted in) 64'
FW	21	Michela Cambiaghi	(yellow card) 90+2'	(substituted in) 73'
MF	8	Emma Severini		(substituted in) 73'
MF	20	Giada Greggi		(substituted in) 89'
DF	13	Julie Piga		(substituted in) 89'
Manager:
Andrea Soncin			(yellow card) 74'

Player of the Match:
Chloe Kelly (England)

Assistant referees:
Sanja Rođak-Karšić (Croatia)
Štaša Špur (Slovenia)
Fourth official:
Désirée Grundbacher (Switzerland)
Reserve assistant referee:
Almira Spahić (Sweden)
Video assistant referee:
Dennis Higler (Netherlands)
Assistant video assistant referee:
Fedayi San (Switzerland)
Willy Delajod (France)

=== Germany vs Spain ===
23 July 2025
21:00

Germany	0–1 (a.e.t.)	Spain
	Report	Bonmatí 113'

Stadion Letzigrund, Zurich
Attendance: 22,432
Referee: Edina Alves Batista (Brazil)

Germany	Spain

GK	1	Ann-Katrin Berger
CB	23	Sophia Kleinherne		(substituted off) 97'
CB	6	Janina Minge (c)
CB	4	Rebecca Knaak
RWB	5	Carlotta Wamser
LWB	17	Franziska Kett
RM	22	Jule Brand
CM	20	Elisa Senß		(substituted off) 114'
CM	13	Sara Däbritz	(yellow card) 17'	(substituted off) 64'
LM	19	Klara Bühl
CF	18	Giovanna Hoffmann		(substituted off) 86'
Substitutions:
MF	16	Linda Dallmann		(substituted in) 64'
FW	15	Selina Cerci		(substituted in) 86'
MF	8	Sydney Lohmann		(substituted in) 97'
FW	11	Lea Schüller		(substituted in) 114'
Manager:
Christian Wück

GK	13	Cata Coll
RB	2	Ona Batlle
CB	4	Irene Paredes (c)
CB	5	María Méndez
LB	7	Olga Carmona
CM	6	Aitana Bonmatí
CM	12	Patricia Guijarro	(yellow card) 107'
CM	11	Alexia Putellas
RF	8	Mariona Caldentey		(substituted off) 103'
CF	9	Esther González	(yellow card) 20'	(substituted off) 68'
LF	20	Clàudia Pina		(substituted off) 77'
Substitutions:
FW	18	Salma Paralluelo	(yellow card) 111'	(substituted in) 68'
MF	10	Athenea del Castillo		(substituted in) 77'
FW	16	Cristina Martín-Prieto		(substituted in) 103'
Manager:
Montse Tomé

Player of the Match:
Aitana Bonmatí (Spain)

Assistant referees:
Neuza Back (Brazil)
Fabrini Bevilaqua (Brazil)
Fourth official:
Tess Olofsson (Sweden)
Reserve assistant referee:
Franca Overtoom (Netherlands)
Video assistant referee:
Tiago Martins (Portugal)
Assistant video assistant referee:
Fedayi San (Switzerland)
Willy Delajod (France)

== Final ==
27 July 2025
18:00

England	1–1 (a.e.t.)	Spain
Russo 57'	Report	Caldentey 25'
Penalties
Mead (penalty missed); Greenwood (penalty scored); Charles (penalty scored); Williamson (penalty missed); Kelly (penalty scored)	3–1	(penalty scored) Guijarro; (penalty missed) Caldentey; (penalty missed) Bonmatí; (penalty missed) Paralluelo

St. Jakob-Park, Basel
Attendance: 34,203
Referee: Stéphanie Frappart (France)

England	Spain

GK	1	Hannah Hampton
RB	2	Lucy Bronze	(yellow card) 59'	(substituted off) 106'
CB	6	Leah Williamson (c)
CB	16	Jess Carter
LB	5	Alex Greenwood
CM	10	Ella Toone		(substituted off) 87'
CM	4	Keira Walsh
CM	8	Georgia Stanway		(substituted off) 115'
RF	11	Lauren Hemp	(yellow card) 95'
CF	23	Alessia Russo	(yellow card) 58'	(substituted off) 71'
LF	7	Lauren James		(substituted off) 41'
Substitutions:
FW	18	Chloe Kelly		(substituted in) 41'
FW	17	Michelle Agyemang		(substituted in) 71'
FW	9	Beth Mead		(substituted in) 87'
DF	3	Niamh Charles		(substituted in) 106'
MF	14	Grace Clinton		(substituted in) 115'
Manager:
(Netherlands) Sarina Wiegman

GK	13	Cata Coll
RB	2	Ona Batlle
CB	4	Irene Paredes (c)
CB	14	Laia Aleixandri
LB	7	Olga Carmona	(substituted off) 106'
CM	6	Aitana Bonmatí
CM	12	Patricia Guijarro
CM	11	Alexia Putellas	(substituted off) 71'
RF	10	Athenea del Castillo	(substituted off) 89'
CF	9	Esther González	(substituted off) 89'
LF	8	Mariona Caldentey
Substitutions:
FW	20	Clàudia Pina	(substituted in) 71'
FW	18	Salma Paralluelo	(substituted in) 89'
MF	19	Vicky López	(substituted in) 89'
DF	15	Leila Ouahabi	(substituted in) 106'
Manager:
Montse Tomé

Player of the Match:
Hannah Hampton (England)

Assistant referees:
Camille Soriano (France)
Francesca Di Monte (Italy)
Fourth official:
Maria Sole Ferrieri Caputi (Italy)
Reserve assistant referee:
Susanne Küng (Switzerland)
Video assistant referee:
Willy Delajod (France)
Assistant video assistant referees:
Christian Dingert (Germany)
Dennis Higler (Netherlands)
