= Italy at the UEFA Women's Championship =

Italian teams record at UEFA Event

Italy have participated 13 times at UEFA Women's Championship.

While the men's senior team have won the UEFA European Championship, the women's team is yet to win a single edition. Italy have participated in the inaugural European Championship in 1984, where they were eliminated in the semi-finals against Sweden. Italy have failed the qualification once, in 1995.

Italy lost two finals: in 1993 against Norway and in 1997 against Germany. It is the best Italy's record.

== UEFA Women's Championship record ==
| UEFA Women's Championship record | | | | | | | | | Qualifying record | | | | | | | |
| Year | Round | Position | Pld | W | D* | L | GF | GA | Pld | W | D* | L | GF | GA | P/R | Rnk |
| (Europe) 1984 | Semi-finals | n/a | 2 | 0 | 0 | 2 | 3 | 5 | 6 | 5 | 0 | 1 | 12 | 1 | | |
| (Norway) 1987 | Third place | 3rd of 4 | 2 | 1 | 0 | 1 | 2 | 3 | 6 | 5 | 1 | 0 | 13 | 6 | | |
| (West Germany) 1989 | Fourth place | 4th of 4 | 2 | 0 | 1 | 1 | 2 | 3 | 8 | 5 | 2 | 1 | 20 | 5 | | |
| (Denmark) 1991 | Fourth place | 4th of 4 | 2 | 0 | 0 | 2 | 1 | 5 | 8 | 3 | 4 | 1 | 13 | 5 | | |
| (Italy) 1993 | Runners-up | 2nd of 4 | 2 | 0 | 1 | 1 | 1 | 2 | 6 | 5 | 1 | 0 | 18 | 6 | | |
| (Germany) 1995 | Did not qualify | | | | | | | | 8 | 4 | 1 | 3 | 18 | 11 | | |
| (Norway) (Sweden) 1997 | Runners-up | 2nd of 8 | 5 | 2 | 2 | 1 | 7 | 6 | 6 | 4 | 2 | 0 | 16 | 3 | | |
| (Germany) 2001 | Group stage | n/a | 3 | 1 | 1 | 1 | 3 | 4 | 8 | 3 | 3 | 2 | 9 | 8 | | |
| (England) 2005 | Group stage | n/a | 3 | 0 | 0 | 3 | 4 | 12 | 10 | 6 | 3 | 1 | 20 | 10 | | |
| (Finland) 2009 | Quarter-finals | n/a | 4 | 2 | 0 | 2 | 5 | 5 | 10 | 8 | 0 | 2 | 26 | 8 | | |
| (Sweden) 2013 | Quarter-finals | n/a | 4 | 1 | 1 | 2 | 3 | 5 | 10 | 9 | 1 | 0 | 35 | 0 | | |
| (Netherlands) 2017 | Group stage | n/a | 3 | 1 | 0 | 2 | 5 | 6 | 8 | 6 | 0 | 2 | 26 | 8 | | |
| (England) 2022 | Group stage | n/a | 3 | 0 | 1 | 2 | 2 | 7 | 10 | 8 | 1 | 1 | 37 | 5 | | |
| (Switzerland) 2025 | Semi-finals | 4th of 16 | 5 | 2 | 1 | 2 | 6 | 7 | 6 | 2 | 3 | 1 | 8 | 3 | (Note: From Euro 2025 onwards a new qualifying format was introduced, linked to the Women's Nations League where teams are divided into leagues with promotion/relegation between the leagues at the end of each cycle.) | 4th |
| (Germany) 2029 | | | | | | | | | | | | | | | | |
| Total | Best: Runners-up | 13/14 | 40 | 10 | 8 | 22 | 44 | 70 | 110 | 73 | 22 | 15 | 271 | 79 | 4th | |

* Draws include knockout matches decided on penalty kicks.

== UEFA Women's Championship performance ==
=== 1984 European Competition for Women's Football ===
8 April 1984
Semi-finals

| Italy | 2–3 | Sweden |
|---|---|---|
| Morace 18'; Vignotto 31' | SvFF Report (in Swedish); FIGC Report (in Italian); Report | Björk 23'; Sundhage 48'; Uusitalo 57' (Note: Other sources credit an Italy own goal along with Sundhage and Börjesson goals.) |

Stadio Flaminio, Rome
Attendance: 5,000
Referee: Werner Föckler (West Germany)

28 April 1984
Semi-finals

| Sweden | 2–1 | Italy |
|---|---|---|
| Sundhage 28', 52' (Note: Other sources credit Doris Uusitalo with the first goal.) | SvFF Report (in Swedish); FIGC Report (in Italian); Report | Morace 50' |

Folkungavallen, Linköping
Attendance: 5,162
Referee: Rolf Haugen (Norway)

Sweden won 5–3 on aggregate.

=== 1987 European Competition for Women's Football ===
11 June 1987
Semi-finals

| Norway | 2–0 | Italy |
|---|---|---|
| Stendal 40'; Støre 73' | Report; FIGC Report (in Italian); NFF Report (in Norwegian); Report |

Ullevaal Stadion, Oslo
Attendance: 5,154
Referee: Eysteinn Guðmundsson (Iceland)

13 June 1987
Third place match

| Italy | 2–1 | England |
|---|---|---|
| Morace 36'; Vignotto 50' | Report; FIGC Report (in Italian); Report | Davis 4' (pen.) |

Marienlyst Stadion, Drammen
Attendance: 504
Referee: Peter Mikkelsen (Denmark)

=== UEFA Women's Euro 1991 ===
11 July 1991
Semi-finals

| Germany | 3–0 | Italy |
|---|---|---|
| Mohr 30', 58'; Raith 60' | DFB Report (in German); FIGC Report (in Italian); Report |

Frederikshavn Stadion, Frederikshavn
Attendance: 3,000
Referee: Roger Philippi (Luxembourg)

14 July 1991
12:15
Third-place match

| Denmark | 2–1 (a.e.t.) | Italy |
|---|---|---|
| H. Jensen 22'; Furlotti 85' (o.g.) (Note: The Italian Football Federation attributes the own goal to Emma Iozzelli.) | DBU Report (in Danish); FIGC Report (in Italian); Report | Fiorini 68' |

Aalborg Stadion, Aalborg
Attendance: 3,100
Referee: Raul Garcia de Loza (Spain)

=== UEFA Women's Euro 1997 ===
| Team | Pld | W | D | L | GF | GA | GD | Pts |
|---|---|---|---|---|---|---|---|---|
| Italy | 3 | 1 | 2 | 0 | 5 | 3 | +2 | 5 |
| Germany | 3 | 1 | 2 | 0 | 3 | 1 | +2 | 5 |
| Norway | 3 | 1 | 1 | 1 | 5 | 2 | +3 | 4 |
| Denmark | 3 | 0 | 1 | 2 | 2 | 9 | −7 | 1 |

30 June 1997
14:00
Group stage

| Germany | 1–1 | Italy |
|---|---|---|
| Meinert 49' | DFB Report (in German); FIGC Report (in Italian); Report | Carta 71' |

Melløs Stadion, Moss
Attendance: 713
Referee: Katriina Elovirta (Finland)

3 July 1997
17:30
Group stage

| Italy | 2–2 | Denmark |
|---|---|---|
| Morace 49'; Panico 80' | FIGC Report (in Italian); DBU Report (in Danish); Report | Terp 23'; M. Pedersen 62' |

Åråsen Stadion, Lillestrøm
Attendance: 538
Referee: Eva Ödlund (Sweden)

6 July 1997
14:00
Group stage

| Norway | 0–2 | Italy |
|---|---|---|
| | NFF Report (in Norwegian); FIGC Report (in Italian); Report | Morace 4', 90+2' |

Åråsen Stadion, Lillestrøm
Attendance: 4,067
Referee: Eva Ödlund (Sweden)

9 July 1997
20:30
Semi-finals

| Italy | 2–1 | Spain |
|---|---|---|
| Fiorini 11'; Morace 29' | FIGC Report (in Italian); Report | Á. Parejo 89' |

Åråsen Stadion, Lillestrøm
Referee: Christine Frai (Germany)

12 July 1997
20:30
Final

| Italy | 0–2 | Germany |
|---|---|---|
| | DFB Report (in German); FIGC Report (in Italian); Report | Minnert 23'; Prinz 50' |

Ullevaal Stadion, Oslo
Attendance: 2,221
Referee: Gitte Lyngo-Nielsen (Denmark)

=== UEFA Women's Euro 2001 ===
| Team | Pld | W | D | L | GF | GA | GD | Pts |
|---|---|---|---|---|---|---|---|---|
| Denmark | 3 | 2 | 0 | 1 | 6 | 5 | +1 | 6 |
| Norway | 3 | 1 | 1 | 1 | 4 | 2 | +2 | 4 |
| Italy | 3 | 1 | 1 | 1 | 3 | 4 | −1 | 4 |
| France | 3 | 1 | 0 | 2 | 5 | 7 | −2 | 3 |

25 June 2001
17:30
Group stage

| Italy | 2–1 | Denmark |
|---|---|---|
| Panico 12', 72' | Report; DBU Report (in Danish); Report | Bukh 75' |

Waldstadion, Aalen
Attendance: 3,193
Referee: Nicole Petignat (Switzerland)

28 June 2001
19:45
Group stage

| Norway | 1–1 | Italy |
|---|---|---|
| Mellgren 16' | Report; NFF Report (in Norwegian); Report | Guarino 14' |

Stadion an der Kreuzeiche, Reutlingen
Attendance: 6,600
Referee: Elke Fielenbach (Germany)

1 July 2001
16:30
Group stage

| France | 2–0 | Italy |
|---|---|---|
| Pichon 37'; Jézéquel 74' (pen.) | Report; Report (in French); Report |

Donaustadion, Ulm
Attendance: 3,100
Referee: Elke Fielenbach (Germany)

=== UEFA Women's Euro 2005 ===
| Team | Pld | W | D | L | GF | GA | GD | Pts |
|---|---|---|---|---|---|---|---|---|
| Germany | 3 | 3 | 0 | 0 | 8 | 0 | +8 | 9 |
| Norway | 3 | 1 | 1 | 1 | 6 | 5 | +1 | 4 |
| France | 3 | 1 | 1 | 1 | 4 | 5 | −1 | 4 |
| Italy | 3 | 0 | 0 | 3 | 4 | 12 | −8 | 0 |

6 June 2005
Group stage

| France | 3–1 | Italy |
|---|---|---|
| Lattaf 16'; Pichon 20', 30' | (Report) | Di Filippo 83' |

Deepdale, Preston
Attendance: 957
Referee: Wendy Toms (England)

9 June 2005
Group stage

| Germany | 4–0 | Italy |
|---|---|---|
| Prinz 11'; Pohlers 18'; Jones 55'; Mittag 74' | (Report) |

Deepdale, Preston
Attendance: 1,279
Referee: Kari Seitz (United States)

12 June 2005
Group stage

| Norway | 5–3 | Italy |
|---|---|---|
| Klaveness 7', 57'; Christensen 29'; Gulbrandsen 35'; Mellgren 44' | (Report) | Gabbiadini 8' 53'; Camporese 69' |

Deepdale, Preston
Attendance: 1,154
Referee: Dagmar Damková (Czech Republic)

=== UEFA Women's Euro 2009 ===
| Team | Pld | W | D | L | GF | GA | GD | Pts |
|---|---|---|---|---|---|---|---|---|
| Sweden | 3 | 2 | 1 | 0 | 6 | 1 | +5 | 7 |
| Italy | 3 | 2 | 0 | 1 | 4 | 3 | +1 | 6 |
| England | 3 | 1 | 1 | 1 | 5 | 5 | 0 | 4 |
| Russia | 3 | 0 | 0 | 3 | 2 | 8 | −6 | 0 |

Source: UEFA.com
25 August 2009
17:30
Group stage

| Italy | 2–1 | England |
|---|---|---|
| Panico 56'; Tuttino 82' | Report | Williams 38' (pen.) |

Lahden Stadion, Lahti
Attendance: 2,950
Referee: Bibiana Steinhaus (Germany)

28 August 2009
17:30
Group stage

| Italy | 0–2 | Sweden |
|---|---|---|
| | Report; Report | Schelin 9'; Asllani 19' |

Veritas Stadion, Turku
Attendance: 5,947
Referee: Bibiana Steinhaus (Germany)

31 August 2009
19:00
Group stage

| Russia | 0–2 | Italy |
|---|---|---|
| | Report | Gabbiadini 77'; Zorri 90+3' |

Olympic Stadium, Helsinki
Attendance: 1,112
Referee: Gyöngyi Gaál (Hungary)

4 September 2009
16:00
Quarter-finals

| Germany | 2–1 | Italy |
|---|---|---|
| Grings 4', 47' | Report | Panico 63' |

Lahden Stadion, Lahti
Attendance: 1,866
Referee: Jenny Palmqvist (Sweden)

=== UEFA Women's Euro 2013 ===
Key
| Team qualified for the knockout stage |

| Team | Pld | W | D | L | GF | GA | GD | Pts |
|---|---|---|---|---|---|---|---|---|
| Sweden | 3 | 2 | 1 | 0 | 9 | 2 | +7 | 7 |
| Italy | 3 | 1 | 1 | 1 | 3 | 4 | −1 | 4 |
| Denmark | 3 | 0 | 2 | 1 | 3 | 4 | −1 | 2 |
| Finland | 3 | 0 | 2 | 1 | 1 | 6 | −5 | 2 |

Source: UEFA.com
10 July 2013
18:00
Group stage

| Italy | 0–0 | Finland |
|---|---|---|
| | Report |

Örjans Vall, Halmstad
Attendance: 3,011
Referee: Teodora Albon (Romania)

13 July 2013
18:00
Group stage

| Italy | 2–1 | Denmark |
|---|---|---|
| Gabbiadini 55'; Mauro 60' | Report | Brogaard 66' |

Örjans Vall, Halmstad
Attendance: 2,190
Referee: Esther Staubli (Switzerland)

16 July 2013
20:30
Group stage

| Sweden | 3–1 | Italy |
|---|---|---|
| Manieri 47' (o.g.); Schelin 49'; Öqvist 57' | Report | Gabbiadini 78' |

Örjans Vall, Halmstad
Attendance: 7,288
Referee: Katalin Kulcsár (Hungary)

21 July 2013
18:00

| Italy | 0–1 | Germany |
|---|---|---|
| | Report | Laudehr 26' |

Myresjöhus Arena, Växjö
Attendance: 9,265
Referee: Katalin Kulcsár (Hungary)

=== UEFA Women's Euro 2017 ===
==== Group B ====
| Pos | Team | Pld | W | D | L | GF | GA | GD | Pts | Qualification |
|---|---|---|---|---|---|---|---|---|---|---|
| 1 | Germany | 3 | 2 | 1 | 0 | 4 | 1 | +3 | 7 | Knockout stage |
| 2 | Sweden | 3 | 1 | 1 | 1 | 4 | 3 | +1 | 4 | Knockout stage |
| 3 | Russia | 3 | 1 | 0 | 2 | 2 | 5 | −3 | 3 | |
| 4 | Italy | 3 | 1 | 0 | 2 | 5 | 6 | −1 | 3 | |

Source: UEFA
Rules for classification: Group stage tiebreakers
17 July 2017
18:00

| Italy | 1–2 | Russia |
|---|---|---|
| Mauro 88' | Report | Danilova 9'; E. Morozova 26' |

Sparta Stadion Het Kasteel, Rotterdam
Attendance: 669
Referee: Jana Adámková (Czech Republic)

21 July 2017
20:45

| Germany | 2–1 | Italy |
|---|---|---|
| Henning 19'; Peter 67' (pen.) | Report | Mauro 29' |

Koning Willem II Stadion, Tilburg
Attendance: 7,108
Referee: Kateryna Monzul (Ukraine)

25 July 2017
20:45

| Sweden | 2–3 | Italy |
|---|---|---|
| Schelin 14' (pen.); Blackstenius 47' | Report | Sabatino 4', 37'; Girelli 85' |

De Vijverberg, Doetinchem
Attendance: 5,203
Referee: Esther Staubli (Switzerland)

=== UEFA Women's Euro 2022 ===
==== Group D ====
| Pos | Team | Pld | W | D | L | GF | GA | GD | Pts | Qualification |
|---|---|---|---|---|---|---|---|---|---|---|
| 1 | France | 3 | 2 | 1 | 0 | 8 | 3 | +5 | 7 | Advance to knockout stage |
| 2 | Belgium | 3 | 1 | 1 | 1 | 3 | 3 | 0 | 4 | Advance to knockout stage |
| 3 | Iceland | 3 | 0 | 3 | 0 | 3 | 3 | 0 | 3 | |
| 4 | Italy | 3 | 0 | 1 | 2 | 2 | 7 | −5 | 1 | |

Source: UEFA
10 July 2022
20:00

| France | 5–1 | Italy |
|---|---|---|
| Geyoro 9', 40', 45'; Katoto 12'; Cascarino 38' | Report | Piemonte 76' |

New York Stadium, Rotherham
Attendance: 8,541
Referee: Rebecca Welch (England)

14 July 2022
17:00

| Italy | 1–1 | Iceland |
|---|---|---|
| Bergamaschi 62' | Report | Vilhjálmsdóttir 3' |

Academy Stadium, Manchester
Attendance: 4,029
Referee: Lina Lehtovaara (Finland)

18 July 2022
20:00

| Italy | 0–1 | Belgium |
|---|---|---|
| | Report | De Caigny 49' |

Academy Stadium, Manchester
Attendance: 3,919
Referee: Ivana Martinčić (Croatia)

=== UEFA Women's Euro 2025 ===
==== Group B ====
| Pos | Team | Pld | W | D | L | GF | GA | GD | Pts | Qualification |
|---|---|---|---|---|---|---|---|---|---|---|
| 1 | Spain | 3 | 3 | 0 | 0 | 14 | 3 | +11 | 9 | Advance to knockout stage |
| 2 | Italy | 3 | 1 | 1 | 1 | 3 | 4 | −1 | 4 | Advance to knockout stage |
| 3 | Belgium | 3 | 1 | 0 | 2 | 4 | 8 | −4 | 3 | |
| 4 | Portugal | 3 | 0 | 1 | 2 | 2 | 8 | −6 | 1 | |

Source: UEFA
Rules for classification: Group stage tiebreakers
3 July 2025
18:00

| Belgium | 0–1 | Italy |
|---|---|---|
| | Report | Caruso 44' |

Stade de Tourbillon, Sion
Attendance: 7,544
Referee: Désirée Grundbacher (Switzerland)

7 July 2025
21:00

| Portugal | 1–1 | Italy |
|---|---|---|
| Gomes 89' | Report | Girelli 70' |

Stade de Genève, Geneva
Attendance: 22,713
Referee: Ivana Martinčić (Croatia)

11 July 2025
21:00

| Italy | 1–3 | Spain |
|---|---|---|
| Oliviero 10' | Report | Athenea 14'; Guijarro 49'; González 90+1' |

Stadion Wankdorf, Bern
Attendance: 29,644
Referee: Iuliana Demetrescu (Romania)

==== Quarter-finals ====
16 July 2025
21:00

| Norway | 1–2 | Italy |
|---|---|---|
| Hegerberg 66' | Report | Girelli 50', 90' |

Stade de Genève, Geneva
Attendance: 26,276
Referee: Stéphanie Frappart (France)

==== Semi-finals ====
22 July 2025
21:00

| England | 2–1 (a.e.t.) | Italy |
|---|---|---|
| Agyemang 90+6'; Kelly 119' | Report | Bonansea 33' |

Stade de Genève, Geneva
Attendance: 26,539
Referee: Ivana Martinčić (Croatia)

== Head-to-head record ==
| Opponent | Pld | W | D | L | GF | GA | GD | Win % |
|---|---|---|---|---|---|---|---|---|
| Belgium | 2 | 1 | 0 | 1 | 1 | 1 | +0 | 50.00 |
| Denmark | 4 | 2 | 1 | 1 | 7 | 6 | +1 | 50.00 |
| England | 3 | 2 | 0 | 1 | 5 | 4 | +1 | 66.67 |
| Finland | 1 | 0 | 1 | 0 | 0 | 0 | +0 | 0.00 |
| France | 3 | 0 | 0 | 3 | 2 | 10 | −8 | 0.00 |
| Germany | 9 | 0 | 3 | 6 | 5 | 17 | −12 | 0.00 |
| Iceland | 1 | 0 | 1 | 0 | 1 | 1 | +0 | 0.00 |
| Norway | 6 | 2 | 1 | 3 | 8 | 10 | −2 | 33.33 |
| Portugal | 1 | 0 | 1 | 0 | 1 | 1 | +0 | 0.00 |
| Russia | 2 | 1 | 0 | 1 | 3 | 2 | +1 | 50.00 |
| Spain | 2 | 1 | 0 | 1 | 3 | 4 | −1 | 50.00 |
| Sweden | 6 | 1 | 0 | 5 | 8 | 14 | −6 | 16.67 |
| Total | 40 | 10 | 8 | 22 | 44 | 70 | −26 | 25.00 |

== See also ==
- Italy at the FIFA Women's World Cup
