= Spain at the UEFA Women's Championship =

Spain UEFA Women's

Spain have participated 5 times at the UEFA Women's Championship: Their best achievement is reaching the UEFA Women's Championships final in 2025, lost on penalties.

== Euro 1997 ==
Spain made their European Championships debut and reached the semi-finals.

== Euro 2013 ==
Spain beat Scotland to qualify.

Spain reached the quarter-final.

Pos	Team	Pld	W	D	L	GF	GA	GD	Pts	Qualification
1	France	3	3	0	0	7	1	+6	9	Advance to knockout stage
2	Spain	3	1	1	1	4	4	0	4	Advance to knockout stage
3	Russia	3	0	2	1	3	5	−2	2	
4	England	3	0	1	2	3	7	−4	1	

Source: UEFA.com

== Euro 2017 ==
Spain were elimated in quarter finals on penalties by Austria.

=== Group D ===
Pos	Team	Pld	W	D	L	GF	GA	GD	Pts	Qualification
1	England	3	3	0	0	10	1	+9	9	Knockout stage
2	Spain	3	1	0	2	2	3	−1	3 (Note: Tied on head-to-head points (3). Head-to-head goal difference: Spain +1, Scotland 0, Portugal −1.)	Knockout stage
3	Scotland	3	1	0	2	2	8	−6	3	
4	Portugal	3	1	0	2	3	5	−2	3	

Source: UEFA
Rules for classification: Group stage tiebreakers
Notes:
19 July 2017
18:00

Spain	2–0	Portugal
Losada 23'; Sampedro 42'	Report

De Vijverberg, Doetinchem
Attendance: 3,188
Referee: Pernilla Larsson (Sweden)

23 July 2017
20:45

England	2–0	Spain
Kirby 2'; Taylor 85'	Report

Rat Verlegh Stadion, Breda
Attendance: 4,879
Referee: Carina Vitulano (Italy)

27 July 2017
20:45

Scotland	1–0	Spain
Weir 42'	Report

De Adelaarshorst, Deventer
Attendance: 4,840
Referee: Jana Adámková (Czech Republic)

=== Quarter-finals ===
30 July 2017
18:00

Austria	0–0 (a.e.t.)	Spain
	Report
Penalties
Feiersinger (penalty scored); Burger (penalty scored); Aschauer (penalty scored); Pinther (penalty scored); Puntigam (penalty scored)	5–3	(penalty scored) García; (penalty scored) Sampedro; (penalty missed) Meseguer; (penalty scored) Corredera

Koning Willem II Stadion, Tilburg
Attendance: 3,488
Referee: Stéphanie Frappart (France)

== Euro 2022 ==
Spain were eliminated in the quarter-finals by England.

=== Group B ===
Pos	Team	Pld	W	D	L	GF	GA	GD	Pts	Qualification
1	Germany	3	3	0	0	9	0	+9	9	Advance to knockout stage
2	Spain	3	2	0	1	5	3	+2	6	Advance to knockout stage
3	Denmark	3	1	0	2	1	5	−4	3	
4	Finland	3	0	0	3	1	8	−7	0	

Source: UEFA
8 July 2022
17:00

Spain	4–1	Finland
Paredes 26'; Bonmatí 41'; L. García 75'; Caldentey 90+5' (pen.)	Report	Sällström 1'

Stadium MK, Milton Keynes
Attendance: 16,819
Referee: Kateryna Monzul (Ukraine)

12 July 2022
20:00

Germany	2–0	Spain
Bühl 3'; Popp 37'	Report

Brentford Community Stadium, London
Attendance: 16,037
Referee: Stéphanie Frappart (France)

16 July 2022
20:00

Denmark	0–1	Spain
	Report	Cardona 90'

Brentford Community Stadium, London
Attendance: 16,041
Referee: Rebecca Welch (England)

=== Quarter-finals ===
20 July 2022
20:00

England	2–1 (a.e.t.)	Spain
Toone 84'; Stanway 96'	Report	González 54'

Falmer Stadium, Brighton and Hove
Attendance: 28,994
Referee: Stéphanie Frappart (France)

== Euro 2025 ==
=== Group B ===
Pos	Team	Pld	W	D	L	GF	GA	GD	Pts	Qualification
1	Spain	3	3	0	0	14	3	+11	9	Advance to knockout stage
2	Italy	3	1	1	1	3	4	−1	4	Advance to knockout stage
3	Belgium	3	1	0	2	4	8	−4	3	
4	Portugal	3	0	1	2	2	8	−6	1	

Source: UEFA
Rules for classification: Group stage tiebreakers
3 July 2025
21:00

Spain	5–0	Portugal
González 2', 43'; López 7'; Putellas 41'; Martín-Prieto 90+3'	Report

Stadion Wankdorf, Bern
Attendance: 29,520
Referee: Iuliana Demetrescu (Romania)

7 July 2025
18:00

Spain	6–2	Belgium
Putellas 22', 86'; Paredes 39'; González 52'; Caldentey 61'; Pina 81'	Report	Vanhaevermaet 24'; Eurlings 51'

Arena Thun, Thun
Attendance: 7,961
Referee: Katalin Kulcsár (Hungary)

11 July 2025
21:00

Italy	1–3	Spain
Oliviero 10'	Report	Athenea 14'; Guijarro 49'; González 90+1'

Stadion Wankdorf, Bern
Attendance: 29,644
Referee: Iuliana Demetrescu (Romania)

=== Quarter-finals ===
18 July 2025
21:00

Spain	2–0	Switzerland
Athenea 66'; Pina 71'	Report

Stadion Wankdorf, Bern
Attendance: 29,734
Referee: Maria Sole Ferrieri Caputi (Italy)

=== Semi-finals ===
23 July 2025
21:00

Germany	0–1 (a.e.t.)	Spain
	Report	Bonmatí 113'

Stadion Letzigrund, Zurich
Attendance: 22,432
Referee: Edina Alves Batista (Brazil)

=== Final ===
27 July 2025
18:00

England	1–1 (a.e.t.)	Spain
Russo 57'	Report	Caldentey 25'
Penalties
Mead (penalty missed); Greenwood (penalty scored); Charles (penalty scored); Williamson (penalty missed); Kelly (penalty scored)	3–1	(penalty scored) Guijarro; (penalty missed) Caldentey; (penalty missed) Bonmatí; (penalty missed) Paralluelo

St. Jakob-Park, Basel
Attendance: 34,203
Referee: Stéphanie Frappart (France)

== UEFA Women's Championship ==
UEFA Women's Championship record									Qualification record							
Year	Round	Position	Pld	W	D	L	GF	GA	Pld	W	D	L	GF	GA	P/R	Rnk
1984	Did not enter								Declined Participation							
(Norway) 1987	Did not qualify								6	1	1	4	7	9		
(West Germany) 1989	Did not qualify								8	2	2	4	4	8		
(Denmark) 1991	Did not qualify								6	0	2	4	3	13		
(Italy) 1993	Did not qualify								4	1	1	2	2	6		
(England) (Germany) (Norway) (Sweden) 1995	Did not qualify								6	3	3	0	29	0		
(Norway) (Sweden) 1997	Semi-finals	4th	4	1	1	2	3	4	6	1	2	3	8	15		
(Germany) 2001	Did not qualify								6	1	1	4	6	17		
(England) 2005	Did not qualify								8	2	1	5	10	10		
(Finland) 2009	Did not qualify								8	5	2	1	24	7		
(Sweden) 2013	Quarter-finals	7th	4	1	1	2	5	7	10	6	2	2	43	14		
(Netherlands) 2017	Quarter-finals	8th	4	1	1	2	2	3	8	8	0	0	40	2		
(England) 2022	Quarter-finals	6th	4	2	0	2	6	5	8	7	1	0	48	1		
(Switzerland) 2025	Runners-up	2nd	6	5	1	0	18	4	4	4	0	0	15	3	(Note: From Euro 2025 onwards a new qualifying format was introduced, linked to the Women's Nations League where teams are divided into leagues with promotion/relegation between the leagues at the end of each cycle.)	1st
(Germany) 2029																
Total		5/14	22	10	4	8	34	23	88	41	18	29	239	105		

== Head-to-head record ==
Opponent	Pld	W	D	L	GF	GA	GD	Win %
Austria	1	0	1	0	0	0	+0	0.00
Belgium	1	1	0	0	6	2	+4	100.00
Denmark	1	1	0	0	1	0	+1	100.00
England	4	1	1	2	5	7	−2	25.00
Finland	1	1	0	0	4	1	+3	100.00
France	2	0	1	1	1	2	−1	0.00
Germany	2	1	0	1	1	2	−1	50.00
Italy	2	1	0	1	4	3	+1	50.00
Norway	1	0	0	1	1	3	−2	0.00
Portugal	2	2	0	0	7	0	+7	100.00
Russia	2	1	1	0	2	1	+1	50.00
Scotland	1	0	0	1	0	1	−1	0.00
Sweden	1	0	0	1	0	1	−1	0.00
Switzerland	1	1	0	0	2	0	+2	100.00
Total	22	10	4	8	34	23	+11	45.45

== See also ==
- Spain at the FIFA Women's World Cup
