= UEFA Women's Euro 2025 Group B =

Football tournament group stage

Group B of UEFA Women's Euro 2025 was played from 3 to 11 July 2025. The group was made up of Spain, Portugal, Belgium and Italy. The top two teams of the group, Spain and Italy, advanced to the quarter-finals.

== Teams ==
Draw position	Team	Pot	Method of qualification	Date of qualification	Finals appearance	Last appearance	Previous best performance	Euro 2025 qualifying rankings (Note: The UEFA Women's Euro 2025 qualifying ranking was used for seeding for the final draw.)	FIFA Rankings June 2025
B1	Spain	1	Group A2 winner	4 June 2024	5th	2022	Semi-finals (1997)	1	2
B2	Portugal	4	Play-off winner	3 December 2024	3rd	2022	Group stage (2017, 2022)	17	22
B3	Belgium	3	Play-off winner	3 December 2024	3rd	2022	Quarter-finals (2022)	12	19
B4	Italy	2	Group A1 winner	16 July 2024	13th	2022	Runners-up (1993, 1997)	4	13

== Standings ==
Pos	Team	Pld	W	D	L	GF	GA	GD	Pts	Qualification
1	Spain	3	3	0	0	14	3	+11	9	Advance to knockout stage
2	Italy	3	1	1	1	3	4	−1	4	Advance to knockout stage
3	Belgium	3	1	0	2	4	8	−4	3	
4	Portugal	3	0	1	2	2	8	−6	1	

Source: UEFA
Rules for classification: Group stage tiebreakers

== Matches ==
=== Belgium vs Italy ===
3 July 2025
18:00

Belgium	0–1	Italy
	Report	Caruso 44'

Stade de Tourbillon, Sion
Attendance: 7,544
Referee: Désirée Grundbacher (Switzerland)

Belgium	Italy

GK	21	Lisa Lichtfus
CB	4	Amber Tysiak
CB	19	Sari Kees	(yellow card) 80'
CB	11	Janice Cayman
RWB	17	Jill Janssens		(substituted off) 66'
LWB	22	Laura Deloose		(substituted off) 87'
RM	15	Mariam Toloba		(substituted off) 66'
CM	10	Justine Vanhaevermaet		(substituted off) 87'
CM	8	Jarne Teulings
LM	7	Hannah Eurlings		(substituted off) 75'
CF	9	Tessa Wullaert (c)
Substitutions:
MF	20	Marie Detruyer		(substituted in) 66'
MF	5	Sarah Wijnants		(substituted in) 66'
MF	13	Elena Dhont		(substituted in) 75'
MF	6	Tine De Caigny		(substituted in) 87'
FW	3	Ella Van Kerkhoven		(substituted in) 87'
Manager:
(Iceland) Elísabet Gunnarsdóttir

GK	1	Laura Giuliani
RB	19	Martina Lenzini	(yellow card) 16'	(substituted off) 72'
CB	23	Cecilia Salvai
CB	5	Elena Linari
LB	3	Lucia Di Guglielmo	(yellow card) 33'	(substituted off) 53'
RM	7	Sofia Cantore	(yellow card) 51'	(substituted off) 72'
CM	6	Manuela Giugliano		(substituted off) 53'
CM	8	Emma Severini
LM	17	Lisa Boattin
SS	18	Arianna Caruso
CF	10	Cristiana Girelli (c)
Substitutions:
DF	2	Elisabetta Oliviero		(substituted in) 53'
MF	20	Giada Greggi		(substituted in) 53'
DF	13	Julie Piga		(substituted in) 72'
FW	21	Michela Cambiaghi		(substituted in) 72'
Manager:
Andrea Soncin

Player of the Match:
Arianna Caruso (Italy)

Assistant referees:
Susanne Küng (Switzerland)
Linda Schmid (Switzerland)
Fourth official:
Hristiana Guteva (Bulgaria)
Video assistant referee:
Fedayi San (Switzerland)
Assistant video assistant referee:
Alen Borošak (Slovenia)

=== Spain vs Portugal ===
3 July 2025
21:00

Spain	5–0	Portugal
González 2', 43'; López 7'; Putellas 41'; Martín-Prieto 90+3'	Report

Stadion Wankdorf, Bern
Attendance: 29,520
Referee: Iuliana Demetrescu (Romania)

Spain	Portugal

GK	23	Adriana Nanclares
RB	2	Ona Batlle		(substituted off) 66'
CB	5	María Méndez
CB	14	Laia Aleixandri	(yellow card) 52'
LB	7	Olga Carmona
CM	19	Vicky López		(substituted off) 81'
CM	12	Patricia Guijarro
CM	11	Alexia Putellas (c)
RF	8	Mariona Caldentey		(substituted off) 77'
CF	9	Esther González		(substituted off) 66'
LF	20	Clàudia Pina		(substituted off) 46'
Substitutions:
MF	10	Athenea del Castillo		(substituted in) 46'
DF	3	Jana Fernández		(substituted in) 66'
FW	18	Salma Paralluelo		(substituted in) 66'
FW	16	Cristina Martín-Prieto		(substituted in) 77'
MF	6	Aitana Bonmatí		(substituted in) 81'
Manager:
Montse Tomé

GK	1	Inês Pereira
CB	19	Diana Gomes
CB	15	Carole Costa (c)
CB	13	Fátima Pinto
RWB	20	Beatriz Fonseca	(substituted off) 46'
LWB	2	Catarina Amado
CM	6	Andreia Jacinto	(substituted off) 46'
CM	11	Tatiana Pinto
AM	8	Andreia Norton	(substituted off) 73'
CF	17	Diana Silva	(substituted off) 83'
CF	10	Jéssica Silva	(substituted off) 68'
Substitutions:
DF	9	Ana Borges	(substituted in) 46'
DF	4	Ana Seiça	(substituted in) 46'
FW	21	Ana Capeta	(substituted in) 68'
MF	14	Dolores Silva	(substituted in) 73'
MF	16	Andreia Faria	(substituted in) 83'
Manager:
Francisco Neto

Player of the Match:
Alexia Putellas (Spain)

Assistant referees:
Mihaela Țepușă (Romania)
Amina Gutschi (Austria)
Fourth official:
Shona Shukrula (Netherlands)
Video assistant referee:
Jarred Gillett (England)
Assistant video assistant referee:
Sian Massey-Ellis (England)

=== Spain vs Belgium ===
7 July 2025
18:00

Spain	6–2	Belgium
Putellas 22', 86'; Paredes 39'; González 52'; Caldentey 61'; Pina 81'	Report	Vanhaevermaet 24'; Eurlings 51'

Arena Thun, Thun
Attendance: 7,961
Referee: Katalin Kulcsár (Hungary)

Spain	Belgium

GK	23	Adriana Nanclares
RB	2	Ona Batlle	(yellow card) 79'
CB	4	Irene Paredes (c)
CB	14	Laia Aleixandri
LB	7	Olga Carmona		(substituted off) 86'
CM	19	Vicky López		(substituted off) 46'
CM	12	Patricia Guijarro
CM	11	Alexia Putellas
RF	8	Mariona Caldentey		(substituted off) 73'
CF	9	Esther González		(substituted off) 73'
LF	20	Clàudia Pina		(substituted off) 81'
Substitutions:
MF	6	Aitana Bonmatí		(substituted in) 46'
FW	16	Cristina Martín-Prieto		(substituted in) 73'
MF	10	Athenea del Castillo		(substituted in) 73'
FW	18	Salma Paralluelo		(substituted in) 81'
DF	15	Leila Ouahabi		(substituted in) 86'
Manager:
Montse Tomé

GK	21	Lisa Lichtfus
CB	4	Amber Tysiak	(yellow card) 41'
CB	19	Sari Kees
CB	11	Janice Cayman
RWB	17	Jill Janssens
LWB	22	Laura Deloose
CM	15	Mariam Toloba		(substituted off) 79'
CM	10	Justine Vanhaevermaet
CM	8	Jarne Teulings	(yellow card) 28'	(substituted off) 79'
CF	9	Tessa Wullaert (c)
CF	7	Hannah Eurlings		(substituted off) 64'
Substitutions:
MF	13	Elena Dhont		(substituted in) 64'
FW	14	Jassina Blom		(substituted in) 79'
MF	23	Kassandra Missipo		(substituted in) 79'
Manager:
(Iceland) Elísabet Gunnarsdóttir

Player of the Match:
Alexia Putellas (Spain)

Assistant referees:
Anita Vad (Hungary)
Irina Pozdejeva (Lithuania)
Fourth official:
Stéphanie Frappart (France)
Video assistant referee:
Tamás Bognár (Hungary)
Assistant video assistant referee:
Momčilo Marković (Serbia)

=== Portugal vs Italy ===
7 July 2025
21:00

Portugal	1–1	Italy
Gomes 89'	Report	Girelli 70'

Stade de Genève, Geneva
Attendance: 22,713
Referee: Ivana Martinčić (Croatia)

Portugal	Italy

GK	12	Patrícia Morais
CB	19	Diana Gomes
CB	15	Carole Costa
CB	13	Fátima Pinto
DM	11	Tatiana Pinto
RM	9	Ana Borges (c)	(yellow card) 75' (yellow-red card) 90+6'
CM	8	Andreia Norton		(substituted off) 76'
CM	7	Kika Nazareth		(substituted off) 84'
LM	5	Joana Marchão		(substituted off) 65'
CF	21	Ana Capeta		(substituted off) 65'
CF	17	Diana Silva		(substituted off) 84'
Substitutions:
DF	2	Catarina Amado		(substituted in) 65'
FW	10	Jéssica Silva		(substituted in) 65'
MF	6	Andreia Jacinto		(substituted in) 76'
MF	14	Dolores Silva		(substituted in) 84'
FW	23	Telma Encarnação		(substituted in) 84'
Manager:
Francisco Neto

GK	1	Laura Giuliani
CB	19	Martina Lenzini
CB	23	Cecilia Salvai
CB	5	Elena Linari
RM	3	Lucia Di Guglielmo		(substituted off) 76'
CM	6	Manuela Giugliano	(yellow card) 40'	(substituted off) 59'
CM	8	Emma Severini
LM	17	Lisa Boattin		(substituted off) 87'
RF	18	Arianna Caruso
CF	10	Cristiana Girelli (c)		(substituted off) 87'
LF	7	Sofia Cantore		(substituted off) 59'
Substitutions:
FW	21	Michela Cambiaghi		(substituted in) 59'
MF	20	Giada Greggi		(substituted in) 59'
DF	2	Elisabetta Oliviero		(substituted in) 76'
MF	14	Valentina Bergamaschi		(substituted in) 87'
FW	11	Barbara Bonansea		(substituted in) 87'
Manager:
Andrea Soncin

Player of the Match:
Cristiana Girelli (Italy)

Assistant referees:
Sanja Rođak-Karšić (Croatia)
Štaša Špur (Slovenia)
Fourth official:
Tess Olofsson (Sweden)
Video assistant referee:
Christian Dingert (Germany)
Assistant video assistant referee:
Sian Massey-Ellis (England)

=== Italy vs Spain ===
11 July 2025
21:00

Italy	1–3	Spain
Oliviero 10'	Report	Athenea 14'; Guijarro 49'; González 90+1'

Stadion Wankdorf, Bern
Attendance: 29,644
Referee: Iuliana Demetrescu (Romania)

Italy	Spain

GK	1	Laura Giuliani
RB	19	Martina Lenzini
CB	23	Cecilia Salvai	(substituted off) 77'
CB	5	Elena Linari (c)
LB	17	Lisa Boattin
RM	2	Elisabetta Oliviero
CM	6	Manuela Giugliano	(substituted off) 76'
CM	18	Arianna Caruso
LM	11	Barbara Bonansea	(substituted off) 77'
AM	7	Sofia Cantore	(substituted off) 85'
CF	9	Martina Piemonte	(substituted off) 58'
Substitutions:
FW	10	Cristiana Girelli	(substituted in) 58'
MF	8	Emma Severini	(substituted in) 76'
MF	15	Annamaria Serturini	(substituted in) 77'
DF	13	Julie Piga	(substituted in) 77'
FW	21	Michela Cambiaghi	(substituted in) 85'
Manager:
Andrea Soncin

GK	23	Adriana Nanclares
RB	3	Jana Fernández
CB	4	Irene Paredes (c)
CB	5	María Méndez
LB	15	Leila Ouahabi
CM	6	Aitana Bonmatí
CM	12	Patricia Guijarro	(substituted off) 87'
CM	11	Alexia Putellas
RF	10	Athenea del Castillo	(substituted off) 58'
CF	18	Salma Paralluelo	(substituted off) 76'
LF	8	Mariona Caldentey	(substituted off) 76'
Substitutions:
MF	19	Vicky López	(substituted in) 58'
FW	9	Esther González	(substituted in) 76'
FW	20	Clàudia Pina	(substituted in) 76'
MF	22	Maite Zubieta	(substituted in) 87'
Manager:
Montse Tomé

Player of the Match:
Patricia Guijarro (Spain)

Assistant referees:
Mihaela Țepușă (Romania)
Franca Overtoom (Netherlands)
Fourth official:
Katalin Kulcsár (Hungary)
Video assistant referee:
Dennis Higler (Netherlands)
Assistant video assistant referee:
Tamás Bognár (Hungary)

=== Portugal vs Belgium ===
11 July 2025
21:00

Portugal	1–2	Belgium
Encarnação 87'	Report	Wullaert 3'; Cayman 90+6'

Stade de Tourbillon, Sion
Attendance: 7,515
Referee: Tess Olofsson (Sweden)

Portugal	Belgium

GK	12	Patrícia Morais
CB	19	Diana Gomes	(yellow card) 30'
CB	15	Carole Costa (c)
CB	13	Fátima Pinto	(yellow card) 90+1'
DM	11	Tatiana Pinto
RM	2	Catarina Amado		(substituted off) 46'
CM	8	Andreia Norton		(substituted off) 46'
CM	7	Kika Nazareth
LM	5	Joana Marchão		(substituted off) 79'
CF	21	Ana Capeta		(substituted off) 56'
CF	17	Diana Silva		(substituted off) 70'
Substitutions:
DF	3	Lúcia Alves		(substituted in) 46'
MF	6	Andreia Jacinto		(substituted in) 46'
FW	10	Jéssica Silva		(substituted in) 56'
FW	23	Telma Encarnação		(substituted in) 70'
MF	14	Dolores Silva		(substituted in) 79'
Manager:
Francisco Neto

GK	21	Lisa Lichtfus
CB	4	Amber Tysiak
CB	19	Sari Kees
CB	11	Janice Cayman
RWB	17	Jill Janssens		(substituted off) 79'
LWB	22	Laura Deloose
CM	15	Mariam Toloba
CM	10	Justine Vanhaevermaet	(yellow card) 60'
CM	8	Jarne Teulings		(substituted off) 79'
CF	9	Tessa Wullaert (c)
CF	14	Jassina Blom		(substituted off) 34'
Substitutions:
MF	20	Marie Detruyer		(substituted in) 34'
MF	13	Elena Dhont	(yellow card) 89'	(substituted in) 79'
DF	2	Davina Philtjens		(substituted in) 79'
Manager:
(Iceland) Elísabet Gunnarsdóttir

Player of the Match:
Tessa Wullaert (Belgium)

Assistant referees:
Almira Spahić (Sweden)
Monica Løkkeberg (Norway)
Fourth official:
Shona Shukrula (Netherlands)
Video assistant referee:
Jarred Gillett (England)
Assistant video assistant referee:
Sian Massey-Ellis (England)

== Discipline ==
Disciplinary points would have been used as a tiebreaker in the group if teams were tied on overall and head-to-head records, with a lower number of disciplinary points ranking higher. Points were calculated based on yellow and red cards received by players and coaches in all group matches as follows:

- first yellow card: plus 1 point;
- indirect red card (second yellow card): plus 3 points;
- direct red card: plus 3 points;
- yellow card and direct red card: plus 4 points;

Team	Match 1				Match 2				Match 3				Points
Team	Booked	(yellow card) (yellow-red card)	Sent off (straight red)	(yellow card) (red card)	Booked	(yellow card) (yellow-red card)	Sent off (straight red)	(yellow card) (red card)	Booked	(yellow card) (yellow-red card)	Sent off (straight red)	(yellow card) (red card)	Points
Spain	1				1								2
Italy	3				1								4
Belgium	1				2				2				5
Portugal						1			2				5
