= Spain at the FIFA Women's World Cup =

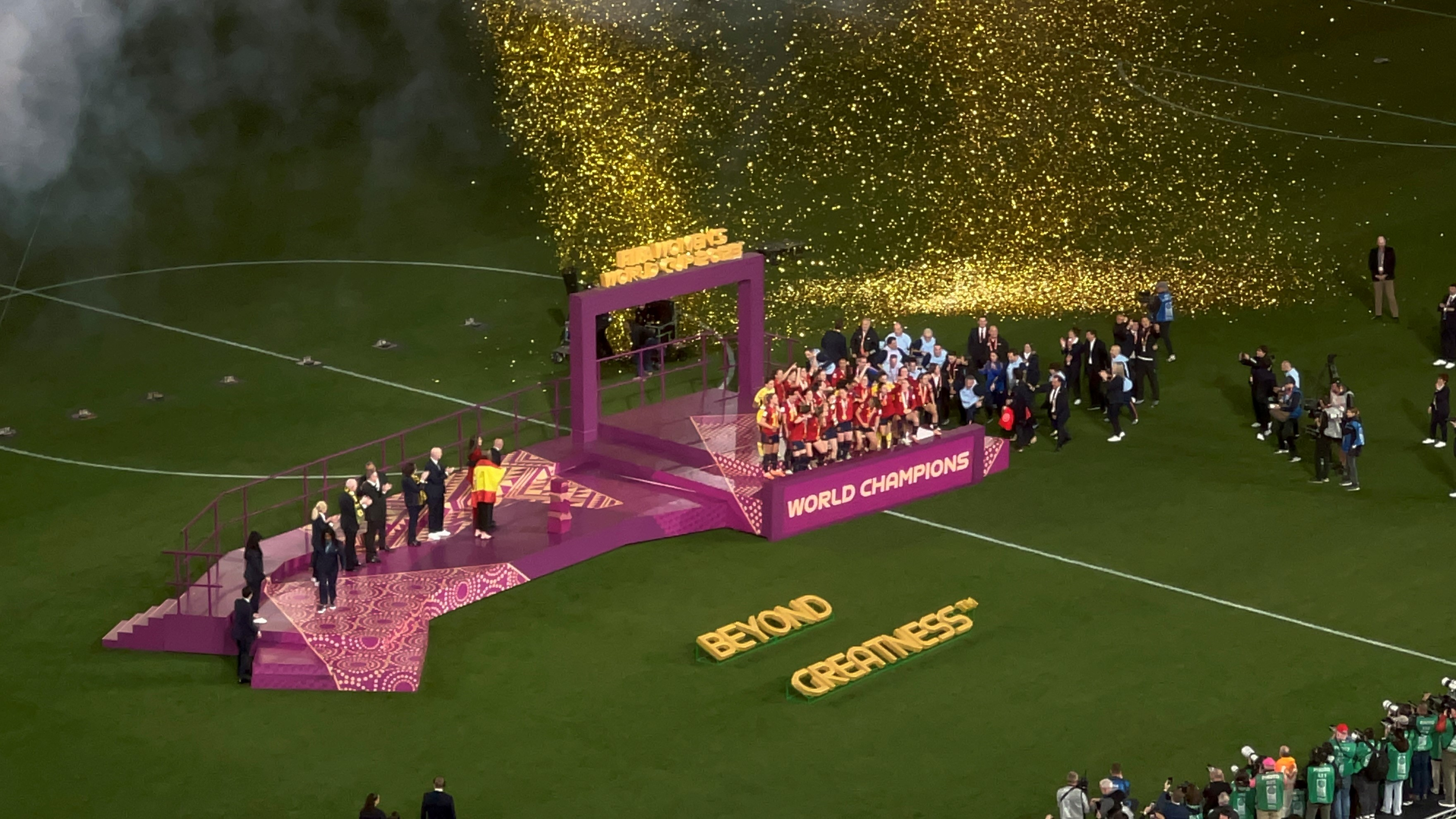
Spain's first Women's World Cup win was at the Stadium Australia in 2023.

The Spain women's national football team has represented Spain at the FIFA Women's World Cup on three occasions, in 2015, 2019 and 2023. Their victory at the 2023 edition of the tournament made Spain the second nation, after Germany, to have won world titles in both men's and women's football.

== FIFA Women's World Cup results ==
Year	Result	Pld	W	D	L	GF	GA
(China) 1991	Did not qualify						
(Sweden) 1995	Did not qualify						
(United States) 1999	Did not qualify						
(United States) 2003	Did not qualify						
(China) 2007	Did not qualify						
(Germany) 2011	Did not qualify						
(Canada) 2015	Group stage	3	0	1	2	2	4
(France) 2019	Round of 16	4	1	1	2	4	4
(Australia) (New Zealand) 2023	Champions	7	6	0	1	18	7
(Brazil) 2027	Qualifed						
(Costa Rica) (Jamaica) (Mexico) (United States) 2031	To be determined						
(United Kingdom) 2035	To be determined						
Total	4/10	14	7	2	5	24	15

FIFA Women's World Cup history
Year	Round	Date	Opponent	Result	Stadium
(Canada) 2015	Group stage	9 June	Costa Rica	D 1–1	Olympic Stadium, Montreal
(Canada) 2015	Group stage	13 June	Brazil	L 0–1	Olympic Stadium, Montreal
(Canada) 2015	Group stage	17 June	South Korea	L 1–2	Lansdowne Stadium, Ottawa
(France) 2019	Group stage	8 June	South Africa	W 3–1	Stade Océane, Le Havre
(France) 2019	Group stage	12 June	Germany	L 0–1	Stade du Hainaut, Valenciennes
(France) 2019	Group stage	17 June	China	D 0–0	Stade Océane, Le Havre
(France) 2019	Round of 16	24 June	United States	L 1–2	Stade Auguste-Delaune, Reims
(Australia) (New Zealand) 2023	Group stage	21 July	Costa Rica	W 3–0	Wellington Regional Stadium, Wellington
(Australia) (New Zealand) 2023	Group stage	26 July	Zambia	W 5–0	Eden Park, Auckland
(Australia) (New Zealand) 2023	Group stage	31 July	Japan	L 0–4	Wellington Regional Stadium, Wellington
(Australia) (New Zealand) 2023	Round of 16	5 August	Switzerland	W 5–1	Eden Park, Auckland
(Australia) (New Zealand) 2023	Quarter-finals	11 August	Netherlands	W 2–1 (a.e.t.)	Wellington Regional Stadium, Wellington
(Australia) (New Zealand) 2023	Semi-finals	15 August	Sweden	W 2–1	Eden Park, Auckland
(Australia) (New Zealand) 2023	Final	20 August	England	W 1–0	Stadium Australia, Sydney
(Brazil) 2027	Group stage				

== 2015 FIFA Women's World Cup ==
=== Group E ===
Pos	Team	Pld	W	D	L	GF	GA	GD	Pts	Qualification
1	Brazil	3	3	0	0	4	0	+4	9	Advance to knockout stage
2	South Korea	3	1	1	1	4	5	−1	4	Advance to knockout stage
3	Costa Rica	3	0	2	1	3	4	−1	2	
4	Spain	3	0	1	2	2	4	−2	1	

Source: FIFA
Rules for classification: Group stage tiebreakers
9 June 2015
16:00 EDT (UTC−4)

Spain	1–1	Costa Rica
Losada 13'	Report	R. Rodríguez 14'

Olympic Stadium, Montreal
Attendance: 10,175
Referee: Salomé di Iorio (Argentina)

13 June 2015
16:00 EDT (UTC−4)

Brazil	1–0	Spain
Andressa Alves 44'	Report

Olympic Stadium, Montreal
Attendance: 28,623
Referee: Carol Anne Chenard (Canada)

17 June 2015
19:00 EDT (UTC−4)

South Korea	2–1	Spain
Cho So-hyun 53'; Kim Soo-yun 78'	Report	Boquete 29'

TD Place Stadium, Ottawa
Attendance: 21,562
Referee: Anna-Marie Keighley (New Zealand)

== 2019 FIFA Women's World Cup ==
=== Group B ===
Pos	Team	Pld	W	D	L	GF	GA	GD	Pts	Qualification
1	Germany	3	3	0	0	6	0	+6	9	Advance to knockout stage
2	Spain	3	1	1	1	3	2	+1	4	Advance to knockout stage
3	China	3	1	1	1	1	1	0	4	Advance to knockout stage
4	South Africa	3	0	0	3	1	8	−7	0	

Source: FIFA
Rules for classification: Group stage tiebreakers
8 June 2019
18:00

Spain	3–1	South Africa
Hermoso 69' (pen.), 82' (pen.); L. García 89'	Report	Kgatlana 25'

Stade Océane, Le Havre
Attendance: 12,044
Referee: María Carvajal (Chile)

12 June 2019
18:00

Germany	1–0	Spain
Däbritz 42'	Report

Stade du Hainaut, Valenciennes
Attendance: 20,761
Referee: Kateryna Monzul (Ukraine)

17 June 2019
18:00

China	0–0	Spain
	Report

Stade Océane, Le Havre
Attendance: 11,814
Referee: Edina Alves Batista (Brazil)

=== Round of 16 ===
24 June 2019
18:00

Spain	1–2	United States
Hermoso 9'	Report	Rapinoe 7' (pen.), 75' (pen.)

Stade Auguste-Delaune, Reims
Attendance: 19,633
Referee: Katalin Kulcsár (Hungary)

== 2023 FIFA Women's World Cup ==
=== Group C ===
Pos	Team	Pld	W	D	L	GF	GA	GD	Pts	Qualification
1	Japan	3	3	0	0	11	0	+11	9	Advance to knockout stage
2	Spain	3	2	0	1	8	4	+4	6	Advance to knockout stage
3	Zambia	3	1	0	2	3	11	−8	3	
4	Costa Rica	3	0	0	3	1	8	−7	0	

Source: FIFA
Rules for classification: Group stage tiebreakers
21 July 2023
19:30 UTC+12

Spain	3–0	Costa Rica
Del Campo 21' (o.g.); Bonmatí 23'; González 27'	Report

Wellington Regional Stadium, Wellington
Attendance: 22,966
Referee: Casey Reibelt (Australia)

26 July 2023
19:30 UTC+12

Spain	5–0	Zambia
Abelleira 9'; Hermoso 13', 70'; Redondo 69', 85'	Report

Eden Park, Auckland
Attendance: 20,983
Referee: Oh Hyeon-jeong (South Korea)

31 July 2023
19:00 UTC+12

Japan	4–0	Spain
Miyazawa 12', 40'; Ueki 29'; Mi. Tanaka 82'	Report

Wellington Regional Stadium, Wellington
Attendance: 20,957
Referee: Ekaterina Koroleva (United States)

=== Round of 16 ===
5 August 2023
17:00 UTC+12

Switzerland	1–5	Spain
Codina 11' (o.g.)	Report	Bonmatí 5', 36'; Redondo 17'; Codina 45'; Hermoso 70'

Eden Park, Auckland
Attendance: 43,217
Referee: Cheryl Foster (Wales)

=== Quarter-finals ===
11 August 2023
13:00 UTC+12

Spain	2–1 (a.e.t.)	Netherlands
Caldentey 81' (pen.); Paralluelo 111'	Report	Van der Gragt 90+1'

Wellington Regional Stadium, Wellington
Attendance: 32,021
Referee: Stéphanie Frappart (France)

=== Semi-finals ===
15 August 2023
20:00 UTC+12

Spain	2–1	Sweden
Paralluelo 81'; Carmona 89'	Report	Blomqvist 88'

Eden Park, Auckland
Attendance: 43,217
Referee: Edina Alves Batista (Brazil)

=== Final ===
20 August 2023
20:00 UTC+10

Spain	1–0	England
Carmona 29'	Report

Stadium Australia, Sydney
Attendance: 75,784
Referee: Tori Penso (United States)

== Goalscorers ==
Player	Goals	2015	2019	2023	2027
Jennifer Hermoso	6		3	3	
Aitana Bonmatí	3			3	
Alba Redondo	3			3	
Salma Paralluelo	2			2	
Olga Carmona	2			2	
Verónica Boquete	1	1			
Lucía García	1		1		
Victoria Losada	1	1			
Esther González	1			1	
Teresa Abelleira	1			1	
Laia Codina	1			1	
Mariona Caldentey	1			1	
Own goals	1			1	
Total	24	2	4	18	

Own goals scored for opponents

- Laia Codina (scored for Switzerland in 2023)

== See also ==
- Spain at the UEFA Women's Championship

== Head-to-head record ==
Opponent	Pld	W	D	L	GF	GA	GD	Win %
Brazil	1	0	0	1	0	1	−1	0.00
China	1	0	1	0	0	0	+0	0.00
Costa Rica	2	1	1	0	4	1	+3	50.00
England	1	1	0	0	1	0	+1	100.00
Germany	1	0	0	1	0	1	−1	0.00
Japan	1	0	0	1	0	4	−4	0.00
Netherlands	1	1	0	0	2	1	+1	100.00
South Africa	1	1	0	0	3	1	+2	100.00
South Korea	1	0	0	1	1	2	−1	0.00
Sweden	1	1	0	0	2	1	+1	100.00
Switzerland	1	1	0	0	5	1	+4	100.00
United States	1	0	0	1	1	2	−1	0.00
Zambia	1	1	0	0	5	0	+5	100.00
Total	14	7	2	5	24	15	+9	50.00
