= Emma Severini =

Italian footballer (born 2003)

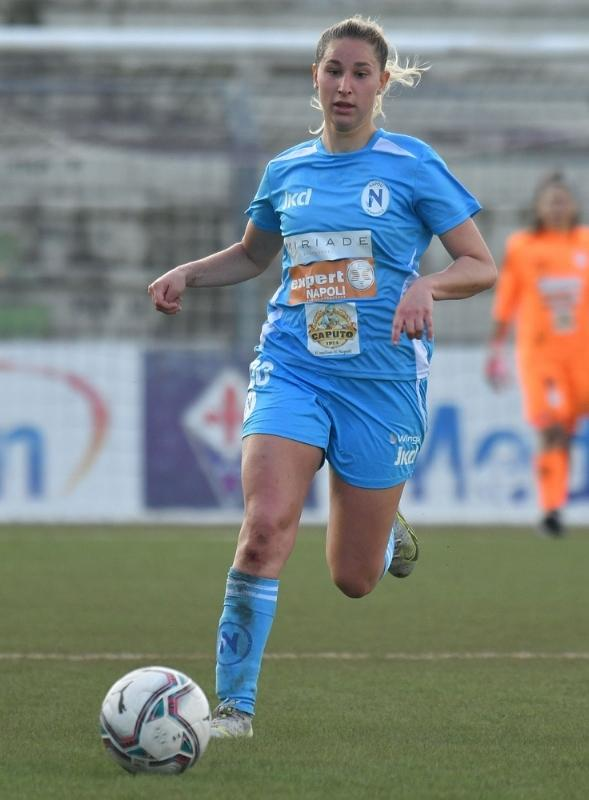
- Napoli Women, 2022

Personal information
- Date of birth: 18 July 2003 (age 23)
- Place of birth: Prato, Italy
- Height: 1.67 m (5 ft 6 in)
- Position: Midfielder

Team information
- Current team: Fiorentina

Youth career
- 20??–2019: Fiorentina
- 2019–202?: Roma

Senior career*
Years	Team	Apps	(Gls)
2019–2022	Roma	6	(0)
2021–2022	→ Napoli (loan)	14	(0)
2022–	Fiorentina	42	(3)

International career^{‡}
2018–2019	Italy U17	9	(2)
2022	Italy U19	3	(0)
2023–	Italy	18	(1)
- * Club domestic league appearances and goals as of 21 July 2024 ‡ National team caps and goals as of 11 October 2026

Emma Severini (born 18 July 2003) is an Italian professional footballer who plays as midfielder for Serie A club Fiorentina and the Italy women's national team. Previously, on loan from Roma. She previously played youth football for Fiorentina and has represented her country at U-17 level.

== Club career ==
Although Severini first began to make an impression at youth level with Fiorentina, she signed with Roma on 30 July 2019. Severini would go on to play her first Serie A games with the Giallorosse, alternating between sporadic appearances for the club at senior level with her continued progressed at youth level playing for Roma Primavera.

By August 2020, Severini began to appear as Italy U-17 captain with her country. One month later, Severini appeared in the 2019-20 Primavera league final for Roma Primavera against Juventus Primavera. The 19 September 2020 fixture was arranged as a one-off "winner takes all" match by the Italian football association, after the 2019-20 Primavera league had been cut short due to a global pandemic. Roma defeated Juventus 2-1 with Severini in the starting lineup, securing a Primavera league title for her team.

Severini would repeat that success just eight months later as she started in Roma Primavera's second consecutive league final against Juventus on 29 May 2021. Roma and Severini won the match to become Primavera league champions for the second time in a row. Earlier in the 2020-21 season, Severini became the youngest-ever Roma player to score for the club at senior level after she scored in the Coppa Italia against Tavagnacco on 21 November 2020. Severini effectively sacrificed any opportunity of playing in the 2021 Coppa Italia final, as she agreed to play for the Primavera in their league final the day prior. The decision would not leave her with enough time to recover for the 30 May 2021 cup final. Nonetheless, owing to her performances earlier in the competition, Severini picked up a 2021 Coppa Italia winner's medal when Roma defeated AC Milan on penalties to lift the trophy.

On 15 July 2021, it was officially announced that Severini moved on loan to Napoli for the 2021-2022 season.

On 19 June 2023, Severini signed a contract through 30 June 2026 with Fiorentina.

== International career ==
On 25 June 2025, Severini was called up to the Italy squad for the UEFA Women's Euro 2025.

=== International statistics ===
As of matches played 8 April 2025

Appearances and goals by national team and year
National team	Year	Apps	Goals
Italy	2023	1	0
Italy	2024	5	0
Italy	2025	2	0
Total		8	1

No.	Date	Venue	Opponent	Score	Result	Competition
1.	4 April 2025	Strawberry Arena, Solna, Sweden	Sweden	1–0	2–3	2025 UEFA Women's Nations League

== Personal life ==
Severini studies accounting. She was born to Cristina and Patrizio and has a sister called Giulia. Her idol is Andrés Iniesta.
