= Andrea Soncin =

Italian footballer and manager (born 1978)

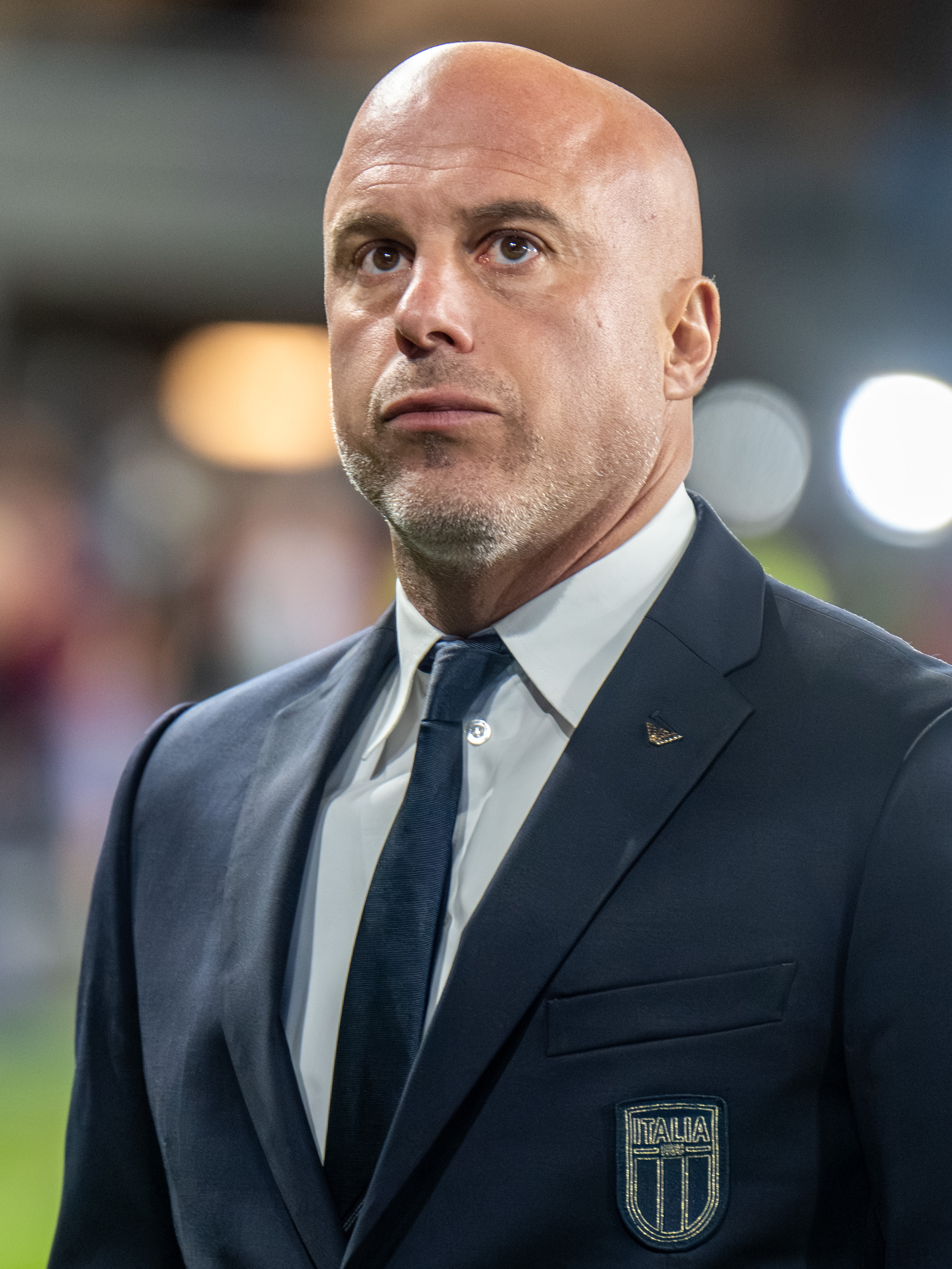
- Soncin in 2025

Personal information
- Date of birth: 5 September 1978 (age 48)
- Place of birth: Vigevano, Italy
- Height: 1.74 m (5 ft 9 in)
- Position: Striker

Team information
- Current team: Italy Women (head coach)

Senior career*
Years	Team	Apps	(Gls)
1995–1996	Solbiatese	9	(1)
1996–1997	Venezia	0	(0)
1997–1998	Solbiatese	19	(0)
1998–2000	Venezia	0	(0)
2000–2001	Vigevano	28	(19)
2001	Perugia	1	(0)
2001–2002	Sambenedettese	23	(11)
2002–2003	Torino	0	(0)
2002–2003	→ Sambenedettese (loan)	32	(12)
2003–2005	Fiorentina	1	(0)
2004	→ Pistoiese (loan)	13	(1)
2004–2005	→ Lanciano (loan)	34	(21)
2005–2007	Atalanta	37	(7)
2007	→ Ascoli (loan)	15	(6)
2007–2009	Ascoli	77	(26)
2009–2010	Padova	39	(7)
2010–2011	Grosseto	31	(2)
2011–2013	Ascoli	64	(16)
2013–2014	Avellino	24	(1)
2014–2016	Pavia	35	(10)
2015–2016	→ AlbinoLeffe (loan)	31	(4)
2016–2017	Montebelluna	22	(13)

Managerial career
- 2022: Venezia (caretaker)
- 2022: Venezia (caretaker)
- 2023–: Italy Women
- * Club domestic league appearances and goals

Andrea Soncin (born 5 September 1978) is an Italian football coach and former player who is currently in charge of the Italian women's national team.

== Football career ==
Soncin started his professional career at Solbiatese of Serie C2. He then played for Venezia youth team and then loaned back to Solbiatese for a season, and then for Vigevano in Serie D.

He then moved to Perugia of Serie A but left for Sambenedettese of Serie C1 after two months.

In the 2003–04 season, he first played for Fiorentina at Serie B then for Pistoiese at Serie C1. He was loaned to Lanciano of Serie C1 in the summer of 2004. He enjoyed his best season in a professional league with them, scoring 21 goals.

=== Atalanta ===
On 21 July 2005, Serie B recently relegated Atalanta signed Soncin. He made 31 league games in his first full Serie B season, and saw he followed Atalanta returned to Serie A.

On 17 September 2006, he made his Serie A debut in a league game against Catania. He just managed to play for Atalanta eight times that season, scoring once against Triestina in a Coppa Italia game.

=== Ascoli ===
On 27 January 2007, he was on loan to Ascoli to help the club avoid relegation.

He scored six goals for the club, just one goal behind the team's top scorer Saša Bjelanović, who played ten more games than Soncin.

At the end of the season, Ascoli finished 19th, failing to avoid relegation.

=== Padova ===
He signed a 2+1 contract with Padova in August 2009. Soncin left Padova at the end of season.

=== Avellino ===
On 13 August 2013 he was signed by Avellino.

=== Pavia ===
On 17 July 2014 he was signed by Pavia.

==== AlbinoLeffe (loan) ====
On 31 August 2015 Soncin was signed by AlbinoLeffe, on loan from Pavia.

=== Montebelluna ===
On 24 October 2016, Soncin was signed by Serie D club Montebelluna.

== Coaching career ==
On 27 April 2022, he was appointed caretaker of Venezia for the final five games of the club's 2021–22 Serie A campaign. He failed to escape the club from relegation and was not offered the permanent job as a consequence, thus moving back to his previous role as youth coach. On 1 November 2022, following the dismissal of Ivan Javorčić as head coach, Soncin was again appointed interim head coach. He guided the club for a single game, a 0–1 defeat to Como, before being replaced by new permanent head coach Paolo Vanoli on 7 November 2022.

On 8 September 2023, Soncin was unveiled as the new head coach of the Italian women's national team, with Viviana Schiavi as his assistant. During the UEFA Women's Euro 2025, Soncin received two yellow cards from the sidelines for inappropriate behaviour towards the fourth official, he was the only manager to receive a yellow card.

== Managerial statistics ==
As of 22 July 2025

Managerial record by team and tenure
Team	Nat	From	To	Record								Ref
Team	Nat	From	To	G	W	D	L	GF	GA	GD	Win %	Ref
Venezia (caretaker)	(Italy)	27 April 2022	9 June 2022	5	1	2	2	7	8	−1	20.00	
Venezia (caretaker)	(Italy)	1 November 2022	7 November 2022	1	0	0	1	0	1	−1	0.00	
Italy	(Italy)	8 September 2023	Present	24	11	6	7	35	23	+12	45.83	
Total				30	12	8	10	42	32	+10	40.00	—

== Honours ==
Atalanta

- Serie B: 2005–06
