= Laura Giuliani =

Italian footballer (born 1993)

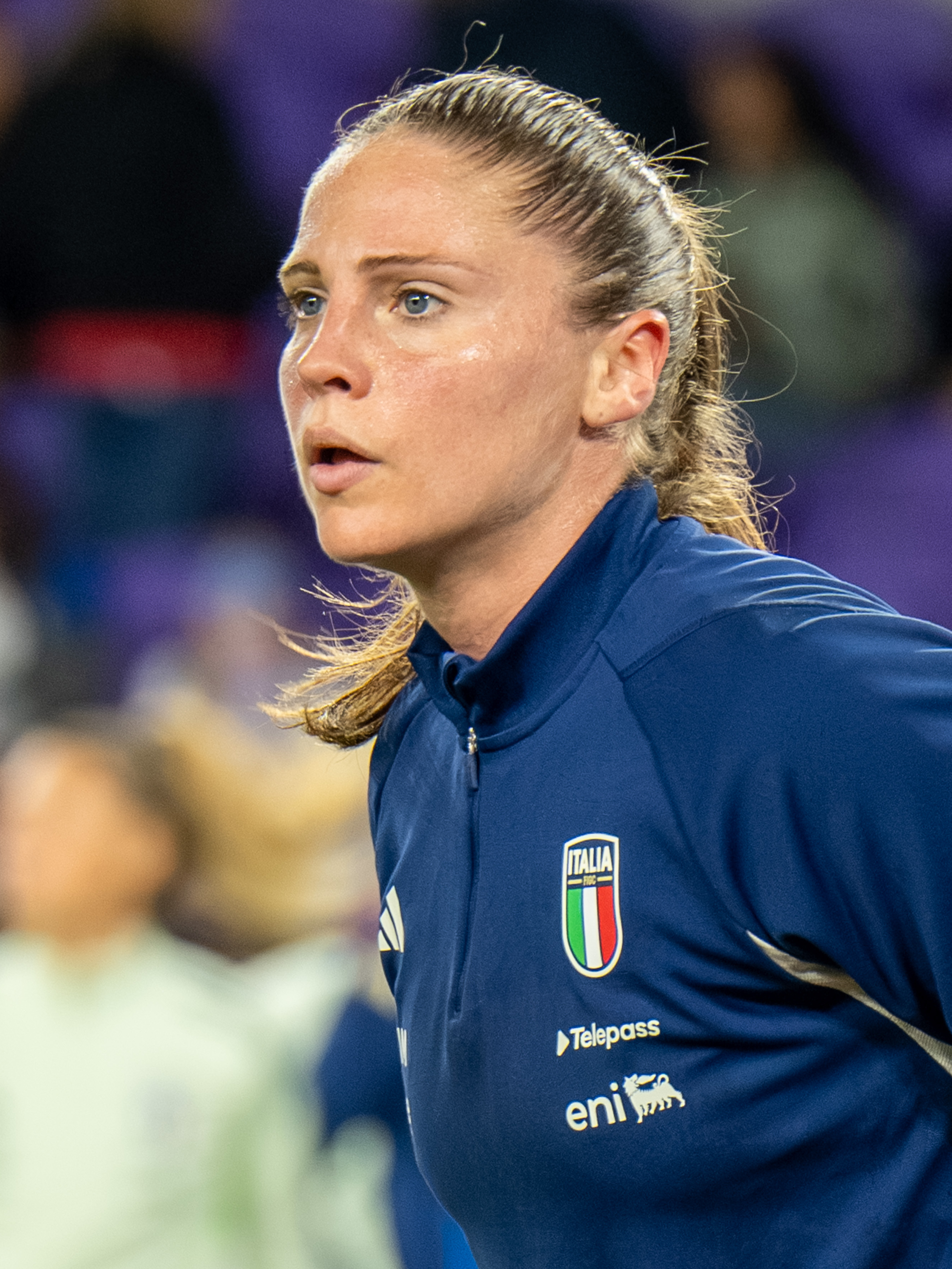
- Giuliani with Italy in 2025

Personal information
- Date of birth: 5 June 1993 (age 33)
- Place of birth: Milan, Italy
- Height: 1.75 m (5 ft 9 in)
- Position: Goalkeeper

Team information
- Current team: VfB Stuttgart
- Number: 1

Youth career
- 2008–2009: S.S. La Benvenuta

Senior career*
Years	Team	Apps	(Gls)
2009–2012	Como 2000	47	(0)
2012–2013	Gütersloh 2009	6	(0)
2013–2015	Herforder SV	29	(0)
2015–2016	FC Köln	13	(0)
2016–2017	SC Freiburg	0	(0)
2017–2021	Juventus	69	(0)
2021–2026	AC Milan	118	(0)
2026–	VfB Stuttgart	11	(0)

International career^{‡}
2011–2012	Italy U-19	13	(0)
2012–2013	Italy U-20	3	(0)
2014–	Italy	101	(0)
- * Club domestic league appearances and goals as of 22 November 2026 ‡ National team caps and goals as of 11 October 2026

Laura Giuliani (born 5 June 1993) is an Italian professional footballer who plays as a goalkeeper for Frauen-Bundesliga club VfB Stuttgart and the Italy national team.

== Club career ==
=== FCF Como 2000 ===
In 2009, having finished her youth career for S.S. La Benvenuta, a club located in Bollate, a city to the north-west of Milan, Giuliani moved to Como to take part in the 2009–2010 Serie A2 season. Her debut came on 14 February 2010, against ACF Trento. She was named on the starting XI for the 2010–2011 season and started all 22 league matches, conceding 15 goals. The team finished even on points with ACF Milan in Group A, as, during the final league match against the rossonere, a late goal handed the win to the Milanese club. At that point, a play-off match was held seven days later, which they lost at the 94th minute. Como 2000, however, was later granted access to the Serie A as well when Reggiana withdrew. Giuliani made her Serie A début on 9 October 2011, against Tavagnacco, and marked 22 appearances out of the 26 league matches, conceding 37 goals as Como finished the season 9th.

=== FSV Gütersloh 2009 ===
On 21 September 2012, Giuliani announced she would be moving to German Bundesliga team FSV Gütersloh 2009. She started her first match for the team on 14 November 2012.

During this time, in order to make a living, she worked on an assembly line, in a bakery and also as a bartender, waitress and sales assistant.

=== 1. FC Köln ===
Giuliani moved to 1. FC Köln for the 2015–16 season; she started as a backup for Lena Nuding but gradually played more and more games, unable, however, to prevent her team from being demoted.

=== SC Freiburg ===
Before the 2015–16 season ended, with Koln already relegated to 2. Bundesliga, Giuliani was signed by SC Freiburg, where she constantly was second-choice to Laura Benkarth, only one year older but also already a player for her national team.

=== Juventus ===
She signed for the newly created Juventus team in 2017. Giuliani made her debut for Juventus on 30 September 2017, in a 3–0 win against Orobica. On 20 May 2018, Giuliani won Juventus' first league of their history winning 5–4 after penalty shoot-out against Brescia. On 24 May 2021, Giuliani announced that she would leave Juventus at the end of the season.

=== AC Milan ===
On 16 July 2021, Giuliani moved to AC Milan.

=== VfB Stuttgart ===
For the 2026/27 season, Giuliani is moving to German Bundesliga newcomers VfB Stuttgart, where he has signed a two-year contract.

== International career ==
=== Under-19 ===
Giuliani received her first call-up for the Italian U19 team on 5 March 2011, for a friendly. She made her UEFA début on 30 May 2011, in the 2011 Women's Euro, in the first group stage match against Russia, as Italy reached the semi-finals, where they were knocked out by Norway. She totalled 19 caps for the U-19 team.

=== Under-20 ===
Giuliani made her FIFA début on 19 August 2012, during the first group stage match against Brazil of the U-20 World Cup. Italy drew 1–1 with Brazil and lost the following two matches, leaving them out of the quarter-finals. Giuliani started all three group stage games, conceding seven goals.

=== Senior ===
Giuliani received her first call-up for the senior team as Italy faced Austria in a friendly held on 7 April 2013. She was left out of the squad which took part in the UEFA Women's Euro 2013. She made her debut on 5 April 2014 against Spain in a 2015 FIFA Women's World Cup qualification match.

Giuliani was called up to the Italy squad for the UEFA Women's Euro 2017.

Giuliani was called up to the Italy squad for the 2019 FIFA Women's World Cup.

On 26 June 2022, Giuliani was announced in the Italy squad for the UEFA Women's Euro 2022.

On 2 July 2023, Giuliani was called up to the 23-player Italy squad for the 2023 FIFA Women's World Cup.

On 25 June 2025, Giuliani was called up to the Italy squad for the UEFA Women's Euro 2025. On 11 July, she received her 100th cap in a 3–1 defeat to Spain.

== Career statistics ==
=== Club ===
As of match played 22 November 2026

Appearances and goals by club, season and competition
Club	Season	League			National Cup (Note: Includes Coppa Italia, DFB-Pokal)		Continental (Note: Includes UEFA Women's Champions League)		Total	
Club	Season	Division	Apps	Goals	Apps	Goals	Apps	Goals	Apps	Goals
Como	2009–10	Serie A2	2	0	0	0	—		2	0
Como	2010–11	Serie A2	23	0	4	0	—		27	0
Como	2011–12	Serie A	22	0	3	0	—		25	0
Como	Total		47	0	7	0	—		54	0
FSV Gütersloh 2009	2012–13	Frauen-Bundesliga	6	0	0	0	—		6	0
Herforder SV	2013–14	2. Frauen-Bundesliga	21	0	2	0	—		23	0
Herforder SV	2014–15	Frauen-Bundesliga	8	0	2	0	—		10	0
Herforder SV	Total		29	0	4	0	—		33	0
FC Köln	2015–16	Frauen-Bundesliga	13	0	1	0	—		14	0
SC Freiburg	2016–17	Frauen-Bundesliga	0	0	2	0	—		2	0
Juventus	2017–18	Serie A	23	0	3	0	—		26	0
Juventus	2018–19	Serie A	13	0	3	0	2	0	18	0
Juventus	2019–20	Serie A	14	0	0	0	2	0	16	0
Juventus	2020–21	Serie A	19	0	3	0	1	0	23	0
Juventus	Total		69	0	9	0	5	0	83	0
A.C. Milan	2021–22	Serie A	20	0	1	0	2	0	23	0
A.C. Milan	2022–23	Serie A	26	0	0	0	—		26	0
A.C. Milan	2023–24	Serie A	21	0	1	0	—		22	0
A.C. Milan	2024–25	Serie A	23	0	3	0	—		26	0
A.C. Milan	2025–26	Serie A	20	0	6	0	—		26	0
A.C. Milan	Total		110	0	11	0	2	0	123	0
VfB Stuttgart	2026–27	Frauen-Bundesliga	11	0	1	0	—		12	0
Career Total			285	0	35	0	7	0	327	0

=== International ===
As of match played 31 October 2023

Appearances and goals by national team and year
National team	Year	Apps	Goals
Italy	2014	11	0
Italy	2015	6	0
Italy	2016	4	0
Italy	2017	6	0
Italy	2018	8	0
Italy	2019	15	0
Italy	2020	4	0
Italy	2021	8	0
Italy	2022	12	0
Italy	2023	5	0
Total		79	0

== Honours ==
Juventus

- Serie A: 2017–18, 2018–19, 2019–20, 2020–21
- Coppa Italia: 2018–19
- Supercoppa Italiana: 2019, 2020

Individual

- AIC Best Women's XI: 2019
