= Elisabetta Oliviero =

Italian association football player

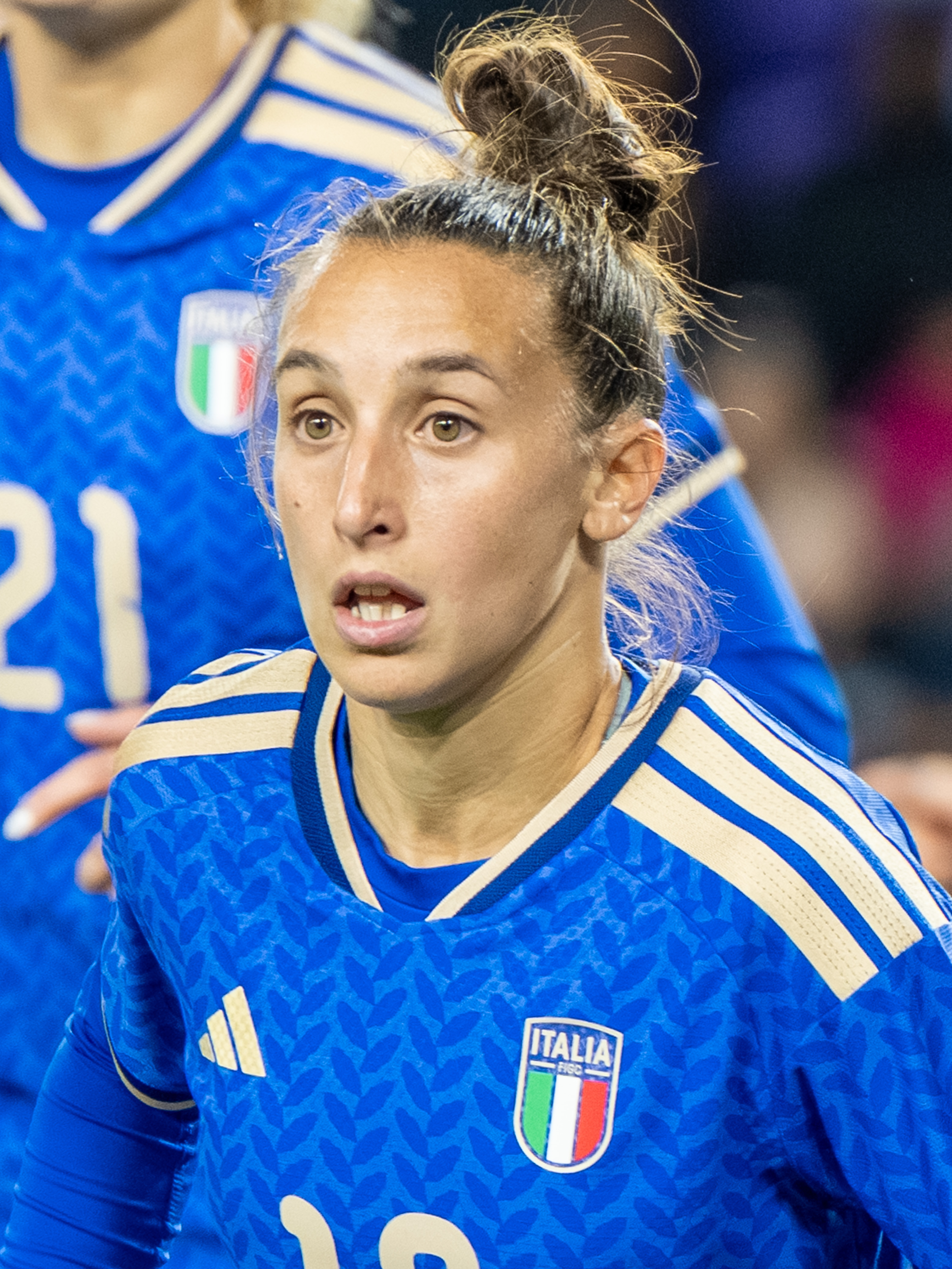
- Oliviero with Italy in 2025

Personal information
- Date of birth: 18 July 1997 (age 29)
- Place of birth: Pompei, Italy
- Positions: Defender; midfielder

Team information
- Current team: Roma
- Number: 13

Youth career
- Molassana Boero

Senior career*
Years	Team	Apps	(Gls)
2012–2016	Molassana Boero	88	(11)
2016–2017	→ Cuneo (loan)	22	(1)
2017–2019	Sassuolo	36	(4)
2019–2021	Napoli	36	(2)
2021–2022	Empoli	18	(2)
2022–2024	Sampdoria	49	(0)
2024–2026	Lazio	47	(3)
2026–	Roma	1	(1)

International career^{‡}
–2014	Italy U17		
–2016	Italy U19		
2018–2023	Italy U23		
2024–	Italy	21	(2)
- * Club domestic league appearances and goals as of 20:54, 3 October 2026 (UTC) ‡ National team caps and goals as of 11 October 2026

Elisabetta Oliviero (born 18 July 1997) is an Italian professional footballer who plays as a defender or a midfielder for Serie A Femminile club Roma and the Italy national team.

== International career ==
Oliviero was part of the Italy's 23-player squad for the UEFA Women's Euro 2025 in Switzerland.

== International goals ==
No.	Date	Venue	Opponent	Score	Result	Competition
1.	11 July 2025	Stadion Wankdorf, Bern, Switzerland	Spain	1–0	1–3	UEFA Women's Euro 2025
2.	14 April 2026	Dubočica Stadium, Leskovac, Serbia	Serbia	2–0	6–0	2027 FIFA Women's World Cup qualification
