= Désirée Grundbacher =

Swiss footballer

Désirée Blanco Grundbacher
Personal information
- Date of birth: 16 August 1983 (age 43)
- Place of birth: Switzerland
- Position: Forward

Youth career
- –1999: FC Bethlehem Bern
- 1999–2003: FC Ostermundigen

Senior career*
Years	Team	Apps	(Gls)
2003–2005	FC Rot-Schwarz Thun		
2005-2008	Grasshopper		

International career
2007–2008	Switzerland	13	(1)
Refereeing career
Domestic
Years	League	Role
2016	2. Liga	Referee
2012–2022	1. Liga	Referee
2013–	Swiss Cup	Referee
2022–	Challenge League	Referee
2022–	Promotion League	Referee
2024	Super League	Referee
International
Years	League	Role
2012–	FIFA listed	Referee
- * Club domestic league appearances and goals

Désirée Grundbacher (born 16 August 1983) is a Swiss football referee and former player. She was promoted to UEFA Elite Referees Category in 2025.

== Playing career ==
Before her refereeing career, Grundbacher played as a forward for FC Rot-Schwarz Thun and GC/Schwerzenbach in the Swiss Women's Super League and was a member of the Switzerland women's national team. Between 2007 and 2008, she played 13 international matches, scoring one goal.

== Refereeing career ==
Since 2012, Grundbacher has been on the FIFA referee list and officiates international football matches.

She regularly officiates matches in the Women's Champions League and Women's Nations League, also several domestic leagues including the Swiss 1. Liga, the Promotion League, and the Challenge League. She also officiated matches in the qualifiers for the 2019 World Cup in France and the 2023 World Cup in Australia and New Zealand, as well as in the qualification for the 2022 European Championship and 2025 European Championship.

On 14 May 2015 Grundbacher served as the Fourth Official in the 2014/15 Women's Champions League final between Frankfurt and Paris Saint-Germain (2:1).

She officiated qualification matches of various UEFA Women's Under-17 and Under-19 Championships over the years. At the Women's U-17 European Championship in 2018 in Lithuania, Grundbacher officiated two group matches and the final between Germany and Spain (0:2).

In 2024, in the 2025 U-21 European Championship qualification, Grundbacher officiated the match between Luxembourg and Azerbaijan.

== Personal life ==
Grundbacher has a son with her partner, whom she met after a football match, and works as a postal assistant.

In 2025, Desiree married her long time partner, Jose.
