= Esther González =

Spanish footballer (born 1992)

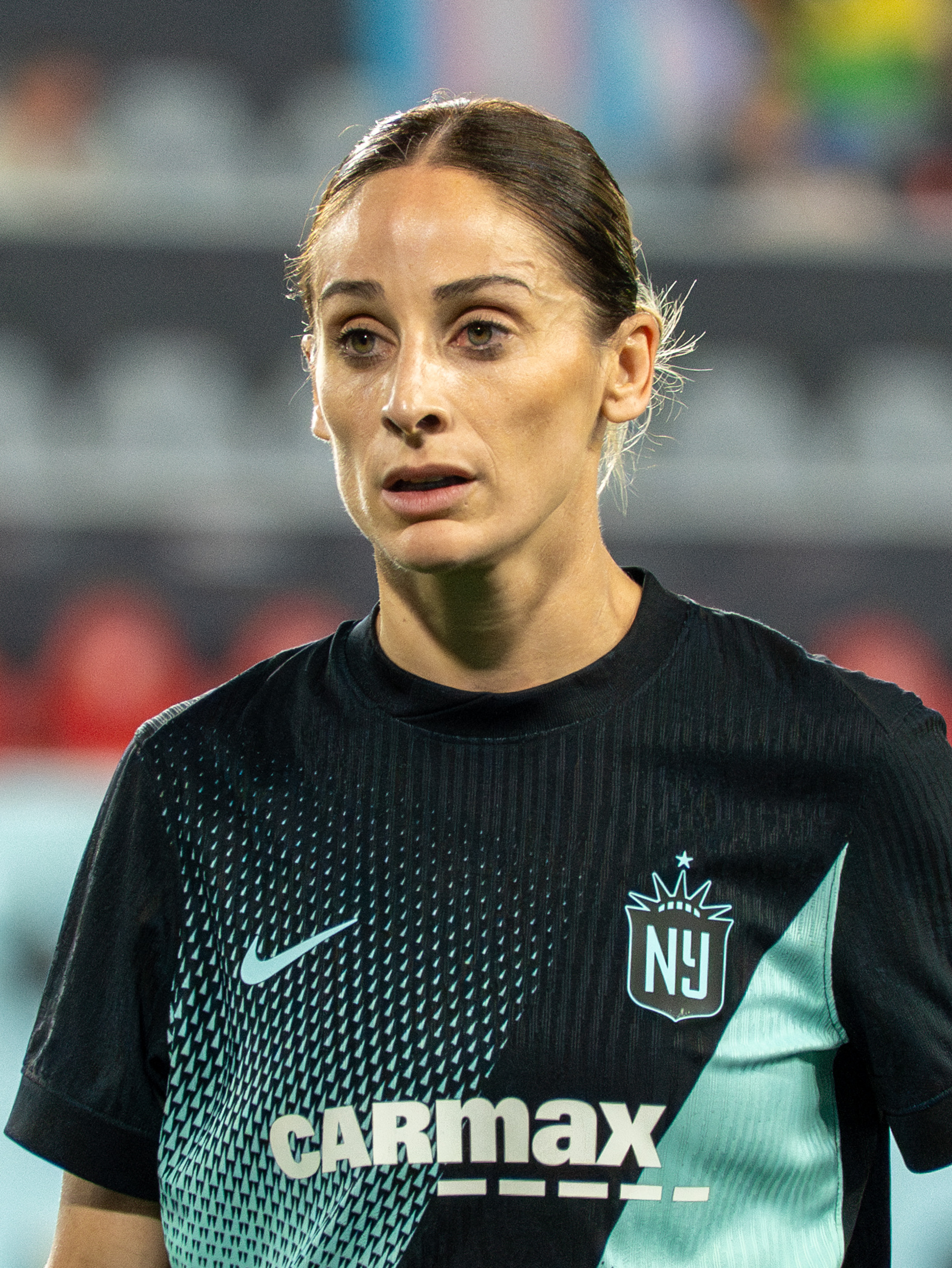
- Esther with Gotham FC in 2025

Personal information
- Full name: Esther González Rodríguez
- Date of birth: 8 December 1992 (age 33)
- Place of birth: Huéscar, Spain
- Height: 1.61 m (5 ft 3 in)
- Position: Striker

Team information
- Current team: Al Qadsiah

Youth career
- 2000–2007: CD Huéscar

Senior career*
Years	Team	Apps	(Gls)
2007–2009	Algaidas		
2009–2011	Levante	47	(12)
2011–2012	Atlético Málaga	34	(12)
2012–2013	Sporting de Huelva	27	(15)
2013–2019	Atlético de Madrid	159	(80)
2019–2021	Levante	53	(29)
2021–2023	Real Madrid	54	(30)
2023–2026	Gotham FC	64	(30)
2026–	Al Qadsiah	0	(0)

International career^{‡}
- Spain U19
2016–	Spain	53	(36)
Medal record
Women's football
Representing Spain
FIFA Women's World Cup
Winner	2023 Australia–New Zealand
UEFA Women's Championship
Runner-up	2025 Switzerland
UEFA Women's Under-17 Championship
Runner-up	2009 Switzerland
- * Club domestic league appearances and goals as of 04:39, 23 November 2025 (UTC) ‡ National team caps and goals as of 17:47, 9 July 2025 (UTC)

Esther González Rodríguez (born 8 December 1992) is a Spanish professional footballer who plays as a striker for Saudi Women's Premier League club Al Qadsiah and the Spain national team. She is the all-time top scorer for Gotham FC of the National Women's Soccer League (NWSL). She also previously played for Atlético Málaga, Sporting de Huelva, Atlético de Madrid, and Real Madrid.

== Club career ==
=== Real Madrid ===
González played for Real Madrid from 2021 to 2023. She left the club as its all-time top women's scorer with 39 goals in 77 games.

=== Gotham FC ===
On 23 August 2023, National Women's Soccer League club NJ/NY Gotham FC signed Esther to a three-year contract with an option to extend for an additional year. She made her club debut on 2 September, coming on for Sinead Farrelly in a 3–3 draw away to the North Carolina Courage. The following game, she made her first start and scored her first and second NWSL goals in a 2–0 home win over the Washington Spirit. On 11 November, she headed in Midge Purce's corner to score the second goal for Gotham in the NWSL Championship Game. It stood as the game winner in a 2–1 victory over OL Reign, giving Gotham its first NWSL championship.

On 24 March 2024, Esther began the season with a goal in a 1–0 victory over the Portland Thorns. On 5 October, she assisted Rose Lavelle and scored two goals of her own against Bay FC within 4 minutes and 20 seconds, marking the fastest three-goal contribution in NWSL history. She finished the regular season with a team-high 9 goals, tied for fourth-most in the league, as Gotham placed third in the standings. In the NWSL semifinals, Esther scored the opening goal in a 1–1 draw against the Washington Spirit; Gotham lost as Esther was one of three players whose penalty attempts were saved by Aubrey Kingsbury.

In May 2025, after starting the season with seven goals in nine games, Esther signed a new contract with Gotham through 2027. On May 25, she scored in the 82nd minute of the CONCACAF W Champions Cup final against Tigres, burying the rebound after Itzel González stopped her penalty kick. Gotham won 1–0 to become the inaugural winners of the competition. She finished the season as the NWSL Golden Boot runner-up with 13 goals before winning her second NWSL Championship in the playoffs.

On 14 March 2026, Esther scored the opening goal of Gotham's season in a 1–0 win over Boston Legacy, coming on as a substitute to earn her 25th career NWSL league goal, the 35th player in the league to reach the milestone. On 26 June, scored scored a penalty in a 2–0 win over the Kansas City Current in the NWSL Challenge Cup, becoming the first NWSL player to score in three different finals. On 27 July, the club announced that Esther had agreed to a mutual contract termination as she took a temporary break from soccer for personal reasons. She left the club as its all-time top scorer in all competitions.

On 23 August 2026, Esther joined Saudi Women's Premier League club Al Qadsiah, signing a one-year deal with an option for an additional season.

=== Al Qadsiah FC ===
In August 2026, Al-Qadsiah signed Esther González, making her the first player to win the Women's World Cup to play in the Saudi Women's Premier League.

== International career ==
Esther González played for the Spain U17 team at the 2009 U-17 European Championship, where Spain was the runner-up to Germany.

Esther made her senior international debut in March 2016, as a substitute in a 0–0 friendly draw with Romania in Mogoșoaia.

She scored five goals in Spain's 13–0 win over Azerbaijan in qualifying for the Euro 2022. She and her team reached the quarter-finals, where Spain lost 2–1 to eventual European champions England in overtime.

In Spain's opening match of the 2023 FIFA World Cup, she scored Spain's third goal in a 3–0 win over Costa Rica. This was the third goal in six minutes for the Spanish and was just their second group stage win at the World Cup.

On 10 June 2025, González was called up to the Spain squad for the UEFA Women's Euro 2025. On July 27, 2025, she started in the tournament's final as Spain finished runners up, losing 3–1 on penalties to England following a 1–1 draw.

== Personal life ==
González is married to Estefanía Cruz. Cruz gave birth to their first baby on 6 January 2026. After moving to Saudi Arabia, González deleted all images of her family life from social media. Her move drew criticism from LGBTQ+ communities given same-sex relationships and sexual activity are illegal in Saudi Arabia.

== Career statistics ==
=== Club ===
As of 27 July 2026

Appearances and goals by club, season and competition
Club	Season	League			National Cup (Note: Includes Copa de la Reina, NWSL Challenge Cup)		Continental (Note: Includes UEFA Women's Champions League)		Other (Note: Includes Supercopa de España, NWSL Playoffs)		Total	
Club	Season	Division	Apps	Goals	Apps	Goals	Apps	Goals	Apps	Goals	Apps	Goals
Levante	2009–10	Superliga Femenina	24	4	3	1	–		–		27	5
Levante	2010–11	Superliga Femenina	23	8	2	1	–		–		25	9
Levante	Total		47	12	5	2	–		–		52	14
Atlético Málaga	2011–12	Primera División	34	12	–		–		–		34	12
Sporting de Huelva	2012–13	Primera División	27	15	–		–		–		27	15
Atlético Madrid	2013–14	Primera División	25	14	2	0	–		–		27	14
Atlético Madrid	2014–15	Primera División	28	12	2	2	–		–		30	14
Atlético Madrid	2015–16	Primera División	29	18	3	2	4	1	–		36	21
Atlético Madrid	2016–17	Primera División	30	15	3	0	–		–		33	15
Atlético Madrid	2017–18	Primera División	26	8	3	0	1	0	–		30	8
Atlético Madrid	2018–19	Primera División	21	13	3	1	3	0	–		27	14
Atlético Madrid	Total		220	107	16	5	8	1	–		225	113
Levante	2019–20	Primera División	19	0	1	0	–		1	0	21	0
Levante	2020–21	Primera División	34	29	3	0	–		2	1	39	30
Levante	Total		53	29	4	0	0	0	3	1	60	30
Real Madrid	2021–22	Primera División	27	14	3	2	8	1	1	0	39	17
Real Madrid	2022–23	Liga F	27	16	1	1	9	5	1	0	38	22
Real Madrid	Total		54	30	4	3	17	6	2	0	77	39
Gotham FC	2023	NWSL	5	2	–		–		3	1	8	3
Gotham FC	2024	NWSL	21	9	1	0	–		2	1	24	10
Gotham FC	2025	NWSL	23	13	–		–		2	0	25	13
Gotham FC	2026	NWSL	15	6	1	1	–		–		16	7
Gotham FC	Total		64	30	2	1	0	0	7	2	73	33
Career total			438	208	31	11	25	7	12	3	487	229

=== International ===
As of match played 3 July 2025

Appearances and goals by national team and year
National team	Year	Apps	Goals
Spain	2016	2	0
Spain	2017	0	0
Spain	2018	1	0
Spain	2019	3	0
Spain	2020	1	1
Spain	2021	8	13
Spain	2022	14	6
Spain	2023	14	7
Spain	2024	2	2
Spain	2025	8	7
Total		53	36

Scores and results list Spain's goal tally first, score column indicates score after each González goal.

List of international goals scored by Esther González
#	Date	Venue	Opponent	Score	Result	Competition
1.	23 October 2020	Estadio La Cartuja, Seville, Spain	Czech Republic	1–0	4–0	UEFA Women's Euro 2021 qualifying
2.	18 February 2021	ASK Arena, Baku, Azerbaijan	Azerbaijan	1–0	13–0	UEFA Women's Euro 2021 qualifying
3.	18 February 2021	ASK Arena, Baku, Azerbaijan	Azerbaijan	2–0	13–0	UEFA Women's Euro 2021 qualifying
4.	18 February 2021	ASK Arena, Baku, Azerbaijan	Azerbaijan	3–0	13–0	UEFA Women's Euro 2021 qualifying
5.	18 February 2021	ASK Arena, Baku, Azerbaijan	Azerbaijan	4–0	13–0	UEFA Women's Euro 2021 qualifying
6.	18 February 2021	ASK Arena, Baku, Azerbaijan	Azerbaijan	12–0	13–0	UEFA Women's Euro 2021 qualifying
7.	23 February 2021	La Ciudad del Fútbol, Las Rozas de Madrid, Spain	Poland	1–0	3–0	UEFA Women's Euro 2021 qualifying
8.	23 February 2021	La Ciudad del Fútbol, Las Rozas de Madrid, Spain	Poland	2–0	3–0	UEFA Women's Euro 2021 qualifying
9.	21 September 2021	Hidegkuti Nándor Stadion, Budapest, Hungary	Hungary	1–0	7–0	2023 FIFA Women's World Cup qualification
10.	21 September 2021	Hidegkuti Nándor Stadion, Budapest, Hungary	Hungary	2–0	7–0	2023 FIFA Women's World Cup qualification
11.	25 November 2021	Estadio de La Cartuja, Seville, Spain	Faroe Islands	1–0	12–0	2023 FIFA Women's World Cup qualification
12.	25 November 2021	Estadio de La Cartuja, Seville, Spain	Faroe Islands	5–0	12–0	2023 FIFA Women's World Cup qualification
13.	25 November 2021	Estadio de La Cartuja, Seville, Spain	Faroe Islands	7–0	12–0	2023 FIFA Women's World Cup qualification
14.	25 November 2021	Estadio de La Cartuja, Seville, Spain	Faroe Islands	10–0	12–0	2023 FIFA Women's World Cup qualification
15.	25 June 2022	Nuevo Colombino, Huelva, Spain	Australia	3–0	7–0	Friendly
16.	20 July 2022	Falmer Stadium, Brighton and Hove, England	England	1–0	1–2	UEFA Women's Euro 2022
17.	2 September 2022	La Ciudad del Fútbol, Las Rozas de Madrid, Spain	Hungary	1–0	3–0	2023 FIFA Women's World Cup qualification
18.	6 September 2022	La Ciudad del Fútbol, Las Rozas de Madrid, Spain	Ukraine	1–0	5–0	2023 FIFA Women's World Cup qualification
19.	6 September 2022	La Ciudad del Fútbol, Las Rozas de Madrid, Spain	Ukraine	4–0	5–0	2023 FIFA Women's World Cup qualification
20.	11 October 2022	El Sadar Stadium, Pamplona, Spain	United States	2–0	2–0	Friendly
21.	16 February 2023	Industree Group Stadium, Gosford, Australia	Jamaica	2–0	3–0	2023 Cup of Nations
22.	22 February 2023	McDonald Jones Stadium, Newcastle, Australia	Czech Republic	1–0	3–0	2023 Cup of Nations
23.	22 February 2023	McDonald Jones Stadium, Newcastle, Australia	Czech Republic	2–0	3–0	2023 Cup of Nations
24.	29 June 2023	Estadio Román Suárez Puerta, Avilés, Spain	Panama	1–0	7–0	Friendly
25.	29 June 2023	Estadio Román Suárez Puerta, Avilés, Spain	Panama	6–0	7–0	Friendly
26.	21 July 2023	Wellington Regional Stadium, Wellington, New Zealand	Costa Rica	3–0	3–0	2023 FIFA Women's World Cup
27.	1 December 2023	Estadio Municipal de Pasarón, Pontevedra, Spain	Italy	2–3	2–3	2023–24 UEFA Women's Nations League
28.	5 April 2024	Den Dreef, Leuven, Belgium	Belgium	5–0	7–0	UEFA Women's Euro 2025 qualifying
29.	5 April 2024	Den Dreef, Leuven, Belgium	Belgium	7–0	7–0	UEFA Women's Euro 2025 qualifying
30.	4 April 2025	Estádio Capital do Móvel, Paços de Ferreira, Portugal	Portugal	4–2	4–2	2025 UEFA Women's Nations League
31.	8 April 2025	Balaídos, Vigo, Spain	Portugal	7–0	7–1	2025 UEFA Women's Nations League
32.	30 May 2025	Den Dreef, Leuven, Belgium	Belgium	1–0	5–1	2025 UEFA Women's Nations League
33.	30 May 2025	Den Dreef, Leuven, Belgium	Belgium	2–0	5–1	2025 UEFA Women's Nations League
34.	3 July 2025	Stadion Wankdorf, Bern, Switzerland	Portugal	1–0	5–0	UEFA Women's Euro 2025
35.	3 July 2025	Stadion Wankdorf, Bern, Switzerland	Portugal	4–0	5–0	UEFA Women's Euro 2025
36.	7 July 2025	Arena Thun, Thun, Switzerland	Belgium	3–2	6–2	UEFA Women's Euro 2025
37.	11 July 2025	Stadion Wankdorf, Bern, Switzerland	Italy	3–1	3–1	UEFA Women's Euro 2025

== Honours ==
Atlético Madrid

- Primera División: 2016–17, 2017–18, 2018–19
- Copa de la Reina: 2016

Gotham FC

- NWSL Championship: 2023, 2025
- NWSL Challenge Cup: 2026
- CONCACAF W Champions Cup: 2024–25

Spain U17

- UEFA Women's Under-17 Championship runner-up: 2009

Spain

- FIFA Women's World Cup: 2023
- UEFA Women's Championship runner-up: 2025
- UEFA Women's Nations League: 2025

Individual

- CONCACAF W Champions Cup: 2024–25 Golden Ball
- UEFA Women's Championship top scorer: 2025
