= Stadion Wankdorf =

Football stadium in Bern, Switzerland

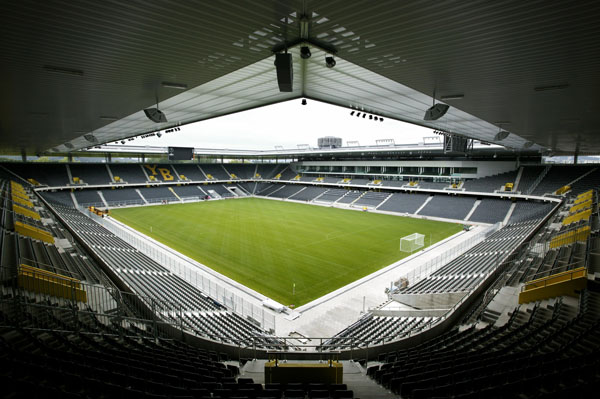
- UEFA
- Interactive map of Stadion Wankdorf
- Former names: Stade de Suisse (2005–2020); Wankdorfstadion (2020–present)
- Location: Papiermühlestrasse 71; CH-3022 Bern, Switzerland
- Coordinates: 46°57′47″N 7°27′53″E
- Owner: Stade de Suisse Wankdorf Nationalstadion AG
- Operator: Stade de Suisse Wankdorf Nationalstadion AG
- Capacity: 32,000 (football); 45,000 (concerts)
- Surface: Artificial grass (Polytan LigaTurf RS Pro CoolPlus)

Construction
- Groundbreaking: 2003
- Opened: 30 July 2005
- Cost: CHF 350 million (2005)
- Architect: Marazzi Generalunternehmung AG

Tenants
- BSC Young Boys (2005–present); Switzerland national football team

Wankdorf Stadium (German: Stadion Wankdorf) is a football stadium in Bern, Switzerland. The second largest all-seater football stadium in Switzerland, it is the home ground of BSC Young Boys. It was also one of the venues for UEFA Euro 2008 and UEFA Women's Euro 2025.

== History ==
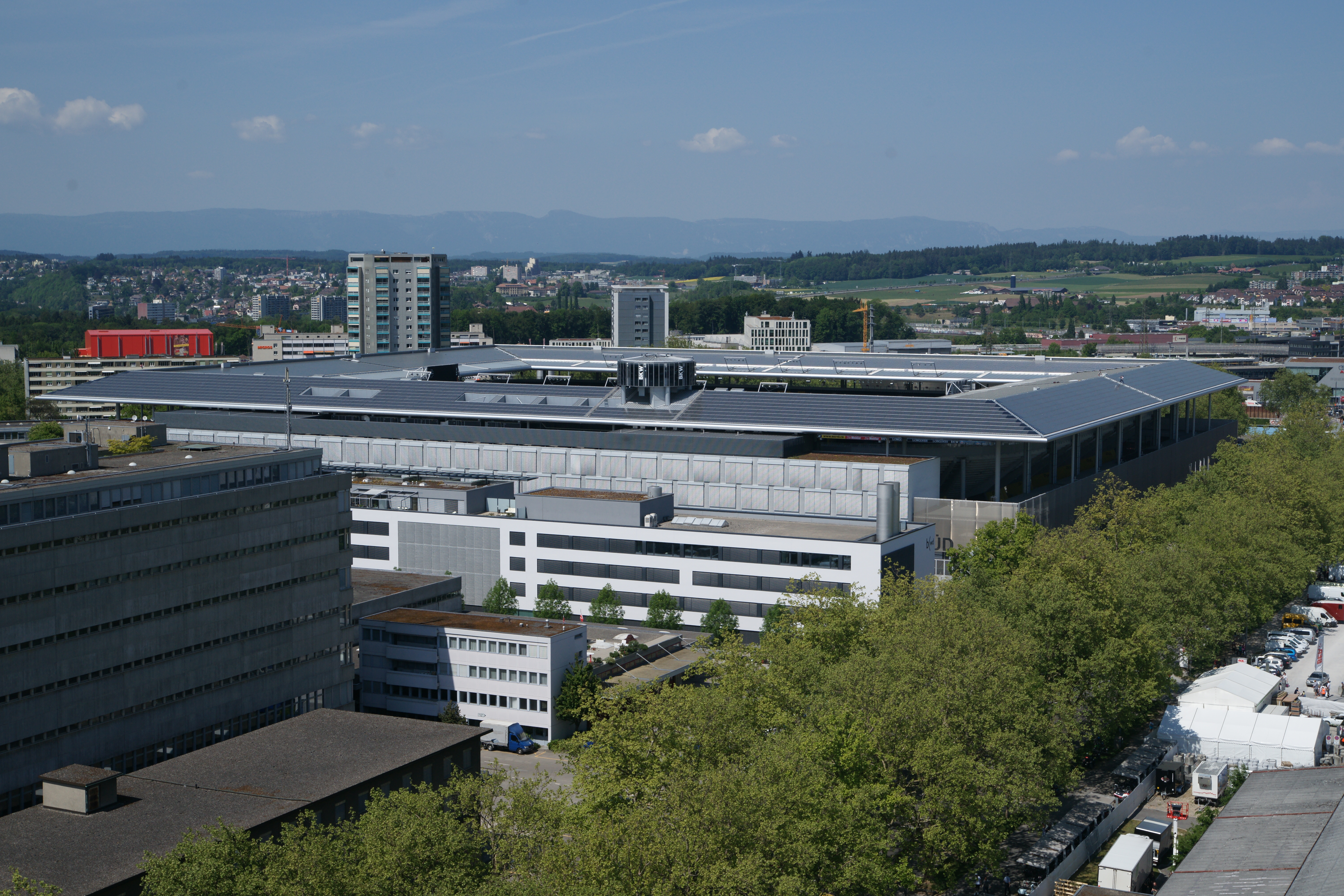
Exterior view, 2011

The present-day Stadion Wankdorf was built on the grounds of the former Wankdorf Stadium, which hosted the 1954 FIFA World Cup final (The Miracle of Bern), and was then demolished in 2001. The new stadium has a capacity of 32,000 spectators, all seated. Integrated into the roof are solar panels with a yearly production of 1,200,000 kWh. The stadium was officially opened on 30 July 2005, although the first match in the new stadium had already taken place on 16 July 2005. Young Boys played against Olympique de Marseille and lost 2–3 with 14,000 spectators watching. The match was considered an "infrastructure test", which is why no more than 14,000 tickets were sold.

The stadium was used by FC Thun for three Champions League home matches in 2005, and for one home match in the UEFA Cup round of 32 in 2006.

Fifteen years after the new stadium opened in 2005 (back then called Stade de Suisse), it was renamed Stadion Wankdorf in June 2020, in an effort to return to the stadium's roots.

=== Pitch ===
Stadion Wankdorf is known for its artificial turf pitch, with cost as one of the reasons to use it. The pitch was criticized by the likes of Pep Guardiola

Natural grass was laid in this stadium twice, for the UEFA Euro 2008 and UEFA Women's Euro 2025

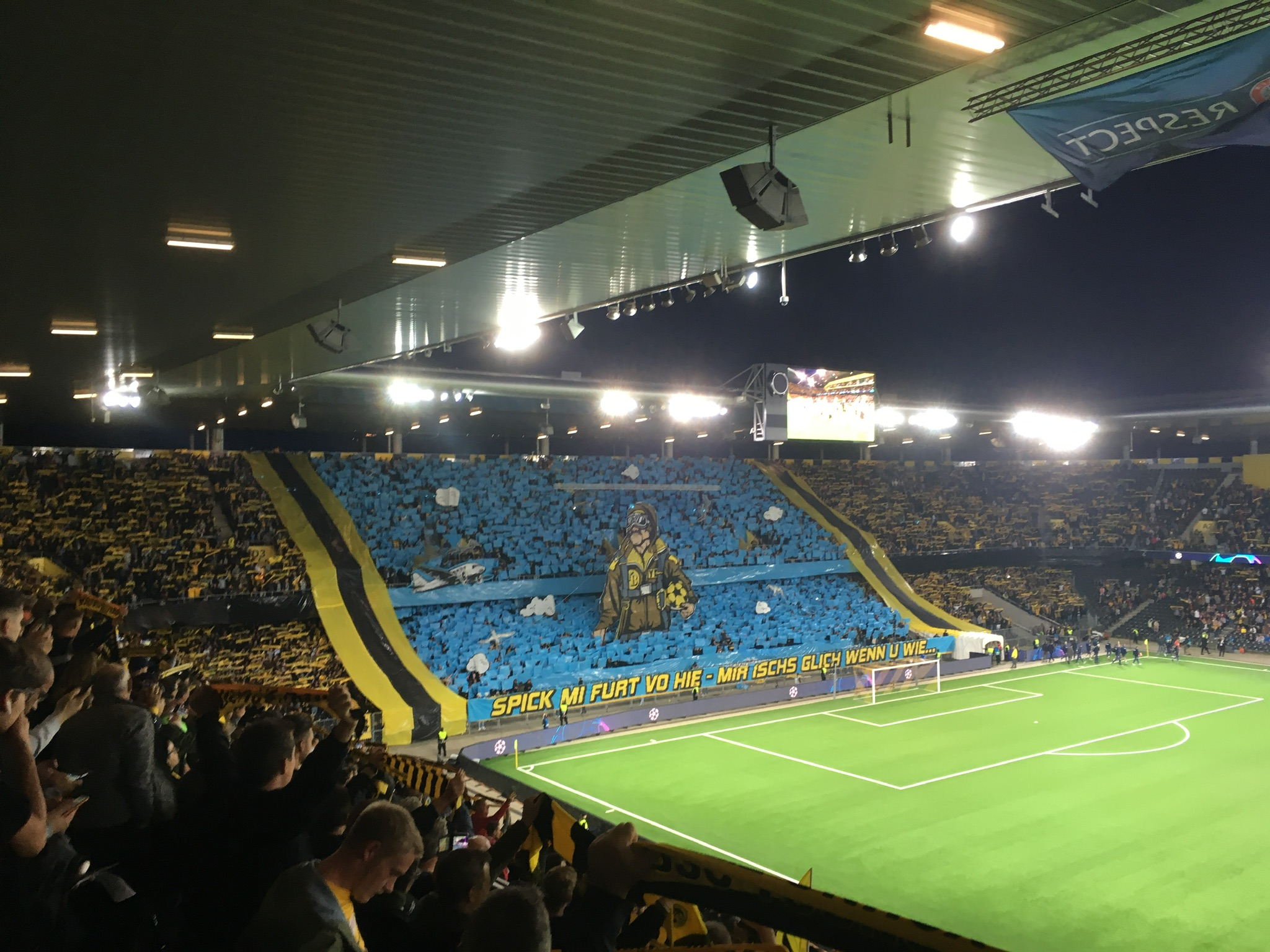
The Wankdorf Stadium before a Champions League Play Off Match in 2019

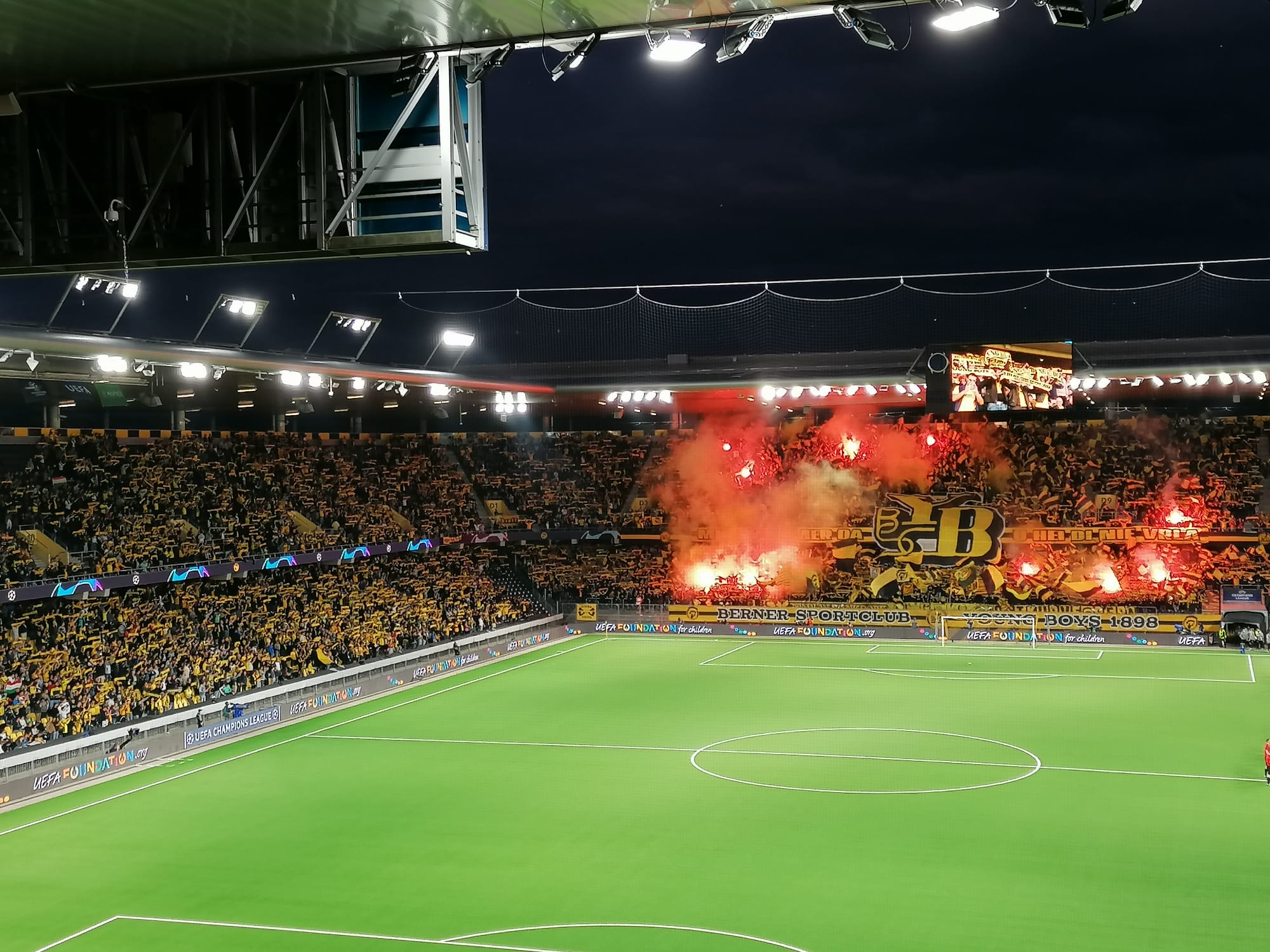
The Wankdorf Stadium before a Champions League Match (2021)

== Concerts ==
Bruce Springsteen performed at the stadium on 30 June 2009 as part of the Working on a Dream Tour in front of a sold-out crowd of 36,538 people.

AC/DC performed at the stadium on 8 June 2010 as part of their Black Ice World Tour and on 29 May 2016 during the Rock or Bust World Tour with Axl Rose as lead singer.

P!nk performed at the stadium on 10 July 2010 during The Funhouse Summer Carnival Tour.

Muse performed a sold-out show at the stadium on 15 June 2013 as part of their The 2nd Law World Tour.

Bon Jovi performed at the stadium on 31 May 2006 during their Have a Nice Day Tour, in front of a sold-out crowd of 38,762 people. The band performed at the stadium for the second time on 30 June 2013 during their Because We Can, in front of a sold-out crowd of 28,868 people.

Depeche Mode performed at the stadium on 7 June 2013 during their The Delta Machine Tour, in front of a sold-out crowd of 39,241 people.

One Direction performed at the stadium on 4 July 2014 during their Where We Are Tour.

On 15 July 2017, Celine Dion brought her Celine Dion Live 2017 tour to the stadium. She performed her sold-out show to 23,143 people, with a mixed set list of English and French.

On 5 June 2019 Rammstein performed in Bern during their Europe Stadium Tour 2019. The concert was sold out in several hours.

Concerts at Stadion Wankdorf
Date	Artist	Tour	Attendance
31 May 2006	Bon Jovi	Have a Nice Day Tour	38,726
23 and 24 August 2006	Robbie Williams	Close Encounters Tour	—
17 June 2007	Genesis	Turn It On Again: The Tour	39,641
27 June 2007	Herbert Grönemeyer	"12" Open Air-Tour	—
30 June 2009	Bruce Springsteen	Working on a Dream Tour	36,538
2 September 2009	Coldplay	Viva la Vida Tour	—
2 June 2010	Muse	The Resistance Tour	—
8 June 2010	AC/DC	Black Ice World Tour	42,000
10 July 2010	Pink	The Funhouse Summer Carnival Tour	42,000
23 June 2011	Herbert Grönemeyer	"Schiffsverkehr" Open Air-Tour	—
2 July 2012	Red Hot Chili Peppers	I'm with You World Tour	—
7 June 2013	Depeche Mode	The Delta Machine Tour	39,241
15 June 2013	Muse	The 2nd Law World Tour	—
30 June 2013	Bon Jovi	Because We Can	28,686
4 July 2014	One Direction	Where We Are Tour	31,037
29 May 2016	AC/DC	Rock or Bust World Tour	41,500
15 June 2017	Justin Bieber	Purpose World Tour	32,108
15 July 2017	Céline Dion	Celine Dion Live 2017	23,143
13 June 2018	Foo Fighters	Concrete and Gold Tour	—
5 June 2019	Rammstein	Rammstein Stadium Tour	41,324
1 June 2022	Elton John	Farewell Yellow Brick Road	TBD
9 June 2022	Imagine Dragons	Mercury Tour	TBD
17 June 2022	The Rolling Stones (cancelled)	Sixty	TBD
11 June 2023	Depeche Mode	Memento Mori World Tour	TBD
3 July 2024	Pink	Pink Summer Carnival	TBD

== The Hot Seat ==
A peculiar feature of the Wankdorf Stadium is the presence of a single, red seat (the other seats are black and yellow). This was the first seat installed at the stadium, on 20 January 2005, and the honour of unveiling it was given to former Young Boys player and manager Walter Eich. There are no tickets available for this seat; every game the seat is occupied by a notable personality, often with ties to Young Boys.

== Ice hockey attendance record ==
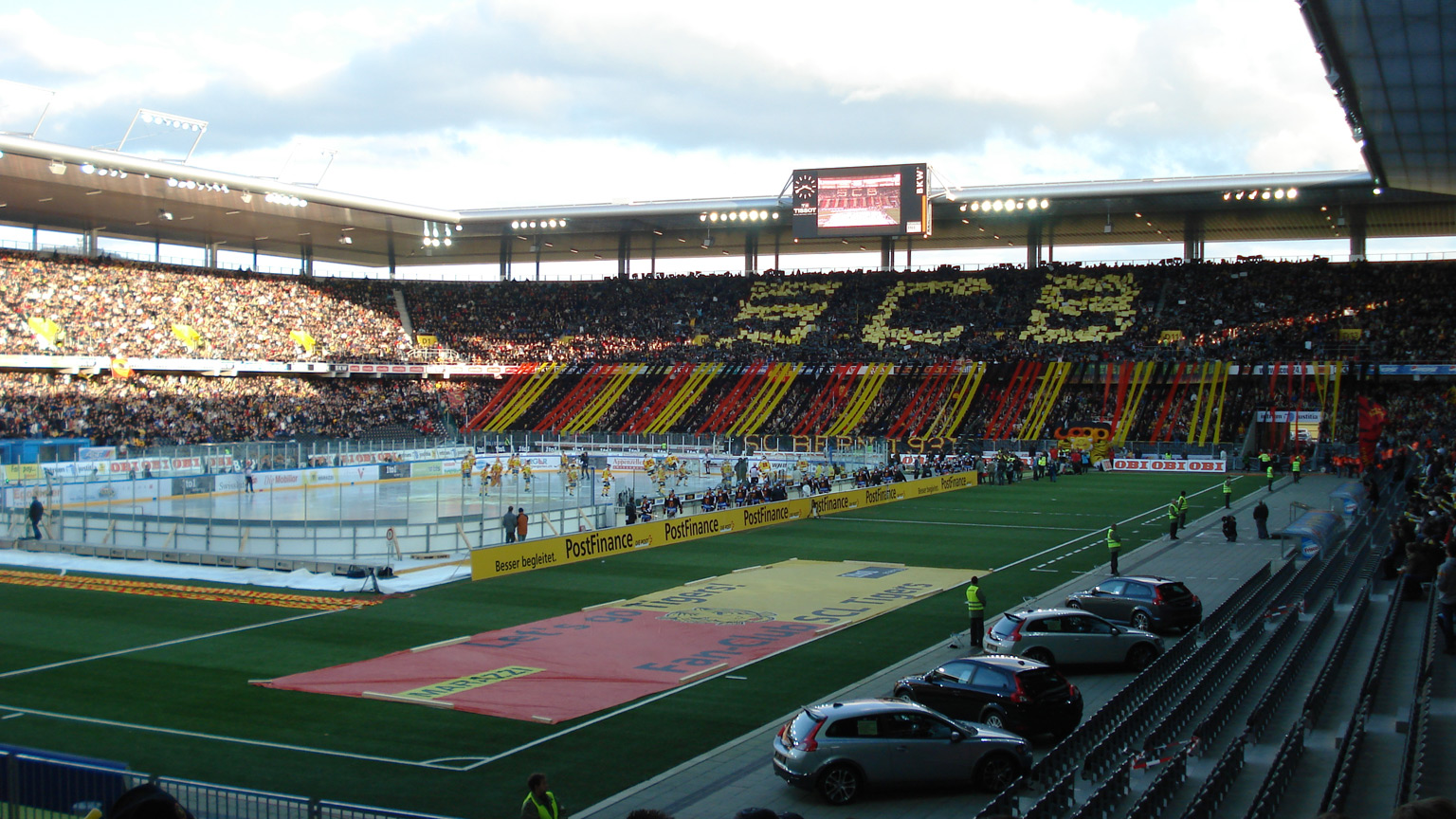
Ice hockey at the Wankdorf

The Wankdorf Stadium with its artificial turf surface was an ideal candidate to provide Europe its first "new era" outdoor attendance record for ice hockey. On 14 January 2007, the massive local rivalry of SC Bern and SC Langnau managed to fill the Stade de Suisse with 30,076 fans, an event which was sold out within 53 hours of tickets going on sale. These two rivals regularly fill SC Bern's home venue Bern Arena with over 17,000 spectators.

== Matches ==
=== UEFA Euro 2008 ===
The stadium was one of the venues for the UEFA Euro 2008. The Netherlands played all three games at the stadium during the tournament:

Date	Time (CEST)	Team #1	Res.	Team #2	Round	Spectators
9 June 2008	20:45	Netherlands	3–0	Italy	Group C	30,777
13 June 2008	20:45	Netherlands	4–1	France	Group C	30,777
17 June 2008	20:45	Netherlands	2–0	Romania	Group C	30,777

=== International matches ===
Date		Result		Competition
8 October 2005	Switzerland	1–1	France	2006 FIFA World Cup Qualification
12 November 2005	Switzerland	2–0	Turkey	2006 FIFA World Cup Qualification
29 February 2012	Switzerland	1–3	Argentina	Friendly
30 May 2012	Spain	4–1	South Korea	Friendly
15 August 2012	England	2–1	Italy	Friendly
12 October 2012	Switzerland	1–1	Norway	2014 FIFA World Cup Qualification
6 September 2013	Switzerland	4–4	Iceland	2014 FIFA World Cup Qualification
15 October 2013	Switzerland	1–0	Slovenia	2014 FIFA World Cup Qualification

=== UEFA Women's Euro 2025 ===
The stadium was one of the venues for the UEFA Women's Euro 2025.

Date	Time (CEST)	Team #1	Res.	Team #2	Round	Spectators
3 July 2025	21:00	Spain	5–0	Portugal	Group B	29,520
6 July 2025	21:00	Switzerland	2–0	Iceland	Group A	29,658
11 July 2025	21:00	Italy	1–3	Spain	Group B	29,644
18 July 2025	21:00	Spain	2–0	Switzerland	Quarter-finals	29,734

== See also ==
- List of football stadiums in Switzerland
