= Monica Renzotti =

Italian footballer

Personal information
- Date of birth: 23 February 2005 (age 21)
- Place of birth: Brescia, Italy
- Position: Forward

Team information
- Current team: Milan
- Number: 18

Youth career
- Castrezzato
- –2019: Brescia
- 2019–2024: Milan

Senior career*
Years	Team	Apps	(Gls)
2024–	Milan	29	(4)

International career^{‡}
2022	Italy U17	3	(1)
2023–2024	Italy U19	10	(3)
2024–	Italy U23	6	(2)
- * Club domestic league appearances and goals as of 9 November 2025 ‡ National team caps and goals as of 9 November 2025

Monica Renzotti (born 23 February 2004) is an Italian professional footballer who plays as a forward for Serie A Femminile club AC Milan and the Italy under-23 national team.

== Early life ==
Renzotti was born on 23 February 2005 in Brescia, Lombardy.

== Club career ==
Renzotti went through the youth teams of Castrezzato, Brescia and AC Milan. With Milan, she won the under-17 championship in 2022, before becoming captain of Milan's under-19 team in the Campionato Primavera 1 and winning the under-19 title in the 2023–24 season.

=== AC Milan ===
In June 2024, Renzotti signed her first professional contract with AC Milan, being promoted to the first team prior to the 2024–25 season alongside fellow under-19 players Erin Cesarini, Nadine Sorelli and Paola Zanini. On 22 September 2024, Renzotti made her professional debut in the Serie A Femminile, coming on as a substitute for Chanté Dompig in the 83rd minute of Milan's 1–1 draw with Inter Milan in the Derby della Madonnina.

In February 2025, Renzotti extended her contract with Milan until 30 June 2028. On 12 April 2025, she scored her first goal in the Serie A Femminile in Milan's 5–3 win over Fiorentina. She finished the 2024–25 season with 26 league appearances (24 of which she started) and one league goal.

== International career ==
Renzotti has represented Italy as a youth international at an under-17, under-19 and under-23 international.

== Honours ==
AC Milan

- Campionato Primavera 1: 2023–24
