= Elimbi =

Elimbi is a Cameroonian surname. Notable people with the surname include:

- Marvin Elimbi (born 2003), French footballer
- Tara Elimbi Gilbert (born 2005), French footballer
