= 1961–62 Coppa Italia =

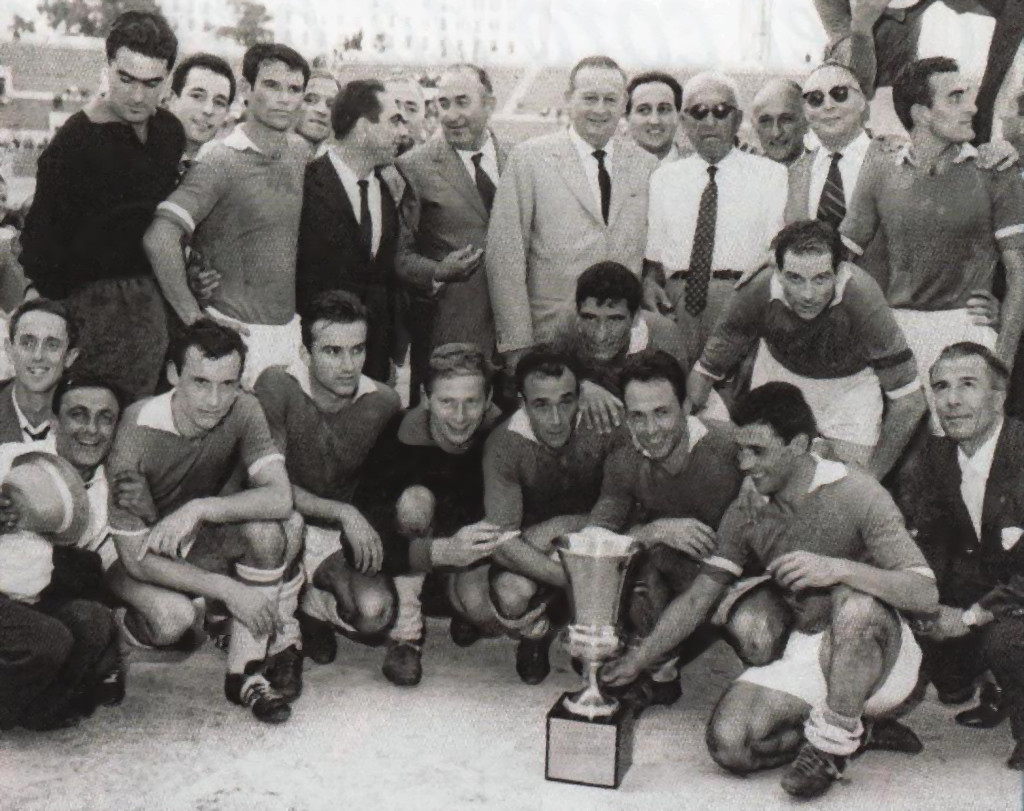
- Napoli's squad posed with the trophy

Tournament details
- Country: Italy
- Dates: 27 Aug 1961 – 21 June 1962
- Teams: 34

Final positions
- Champions: Napoli (1st title)
- Runners-up: SPAL

Tournament statistics
- Matches played: 38
- Goals scored: 95 (2.5 per match)
- Top goal scorer(s): Ettore Recagni; Glauco Gilardoni (3 goals)

The 1961–62 Coppa Italia was the 15th Coppa Italia, the major Italian domestic cup. The competition was won by Napoli, who defeated SPAL in a one-legged final played at the Stadio Olimpico in Rome. This was (and, to this day, still is) the first time a team playing in Serie B won the domestic cup of Italy.

== First round ==
Serie B teams.

Home team	Score	Away team
Brescia	3-1	Como
Lazio	3-1	Genoa
Messina	2-1	Cosenza
Modena	2-1	Reggiana
Napoli	1-1 (p: 6–5)	Alessandria
Parma	0-1 (aet)	Novara
Prato	1-0	Lucchese
Sambenedettese	1-1 (p: 3–4)	Catanzaro
Monza	0-3	Bari
Hellas Verona	2-0	Pro Patria

p=after penalty shoot-out

== Second round ==
14 clubs from Serie A are added.

Home team	Score	Away team
Hellas Verona	2-2 (p: 5–6)	SPAL
Novara	2-0	Udinese
Milan	0-1	Modena
Lecco	3-2 (aet)	Bari
Padova	0-2	Brescia
Prato	2-3	Juventus
Lazio	1-0	Palermo
Napoli	0-0 (p: 7–6)	Sampdoria
Bologna	1-1 (p: 6–7)	Catanzaro
Catania	1-0	Messina
Fiorentina	2-0	Atalanta
Mantova	1-0	Venezia

p=after penalty shoot-out

== Round of 16 ==
Vicenza, Internazionale, Roma and Torino are added.

Home team	Score	Away team
Vicenza	1-2	SPAL
Internazionale	1-2	Novara
Lecco	4-1	Modena
Brescia	0-1	Juventus
Roma	0-0 (p: 6–4)	Lazio
Torino	0-2	Napoli
Catanzaro	1-0 (aet)	Catania
Mantova	4-1	Fiorentina

p=after penalty shoot-out

== Quarter-finals ==
Home team	Score	Away team
Juventus	3-0	Lecco
SPAL	3-1	Novara
Roma	0-1	Napoli
Mantova	3-0	Catanzaro

== Semi-finals ==
Home team	Score	Away team
SPAL	4-1	Juventus
Napoli	2-1	Mantova

== Third place match ==
Home team	Score	Away team
Mantova	1-0	Juventus

== Final ==
21 June 1962

Napoli	2–1	SPAL
Corelli 12'; Ronzon 78'		Micheli 16'

Stadio Olimpico, Rome
Referee: Pietro Bonetto

== Top goalscorers ==
Rank	Player	Club	Goals
1	(Italy) Glauco Gilardoni	Napoli	3
1	(Italy) Ettore Recagni	Mantova	3
3	(Italy) Gino Stacchini	Juventus	2
3	(Wales) John Charles	Juventus	2
3	(Italy) Italo Mazzero	Mantova	2
3	(Italy) Gianni Corelli	Napoli	2
3	(Italy) Dante Micheli	SPAL	2
3	(Italy) Carlo Dell'Omodarme	SPAL	2
