= 2025–26 Serie A (women) =

Italian women's football top division, 2025–26 season

Serie A Women
- Season: 2025–26
- Dates: 4 October 2025 – 17 May 2026
- Champions: Roma; 3rd title
- Relegated: Genoa
- Champions League: Roma; Inter Milan; Juventus
- Matches: 132
- Goals: 345 (2.61 per match)
- Top goalscorer: Tessa Wullaert (14 goals)
- Best goalkeeper: Rachele Baldi (11 clean sheets)
- Biggest home win: Inter Milan 5–0 Ternana; 5 October 2025
- Biggest away win: Milan 1–5 Inter Milan; 13 October 2025
- Highest scoring: Ternana 3–4 Napoli; 12 October 2025; Fiorentina 4–3 Milan; 18 October 2025; Fiorentina 5–2 Roma; 7 November 2025; Genoa 2–5 Lazio; 7 February 2026; Roma 4–3 Como; 3 April 2026; Inter Milan 5–2 Lazio; 4 April 2026
- Longest winning run: 8 games Inter Milan
- Longest unbeaten run: 17 games Roma
- Longest winless run: 15 games Genoa
- Longest losing run: 5 games Genoa; Ternana

The 2025–26 Serie A Women, known as the 2025–26 Serie A Women Athora for sponsorship reasons, was the 59th season of the Serie A Women, the top division of women's football in Italy. The season began 4 October 2025 and concluded on 17 May 2026.

Juventus were the reigning champions, having won their sixth scudetto in the previous season. Roma were crowned champions on 2 May 2026 following a 2–0 victory at home over Ternana, winning their third scudetto.

Genoa were relegated back to the Serie B Women on 9 May 2026 after just one season in the Serie A Women.

== Format changes ==
The number of teams re-increased from 10 to 12 for the first time since 2021–22.

Additionally, the two-phase format was abandoned and replaced by a classic 22-match league format, the same format used by the men's Serie A.

== Teams ==
=== Changes ===
▲ from 2024–25 Serie B	▼ to 2024–25 Serie B
Ternana; Parma; Genoa	Sampdoria

=== Stadiums and locations ===
Locations of the 2026–27 Serie A Women teams

Team	Location	Stadium	Capacity
FC Como	Seregno	Stadio Ferrucio	2,000
Fiorentina	Bagno a Ripoli	Viola Park	3,000
Genoa	Genoa (Montesignano)	Stadio La Sciorba	4,000
Inter Milan	Milan (Porta Sempione)	Arena Civica	10,000
Juventus	Biella	Stadio La Marmora-Pozzo	5,827
Lazio	Formello	Centro Sportivo di Formello	3,000
Milan	Fiorenzuola d'Arda	Velodromo Attilio Pavesi	4,000
Napoli	Cercola	Stadio Giuseppe Piccolo	3,947
Parma	Noceto	Stadio Il Noce	800
Roma	Rome (EUR)	Stadio Tre Fontane	4,000
Sassuolo	Sassuolo	Stadio Enzo Ricci	4,008
Ternana	Narni	Stadio Moreno Gubbiotti	800

=== Personnel and kits ===
Team	Manager	Captain	Kit manufacturer	Shirt sponsors (front)	Shirt sponsors (back)	Shirt sponsors (sleeve)	Shorts sponsors
Como	(Italy) Paolo Tramezzani	(Italy) Giulia Rizzon	(United States) Nike	None	None	TLT Srl	2 Aeffe
Fiorentina	(Sweden) Pablo Piñones Arce	(Italy) Emma Severini	(Italy) Kappa	Mediacom	Yogurt Greco Altoproteico	Subbyx	Barberino Outlet
Genoa	(Argentina) Sebastiàn De La Fuente	(Italy) Giada Abate	(Italy) Kappa	Niasca Portofino	San Giorgio del Porto	None	None
Inter Milan	(Italy) Gianpiero Piovani	(Hungary) Henrietta Csiszár	(United States) Nike	Betsson.sport	U-Power	Gate.io	TIM
Juventus	(Italy) Massimiliano Canzi	(Italy) Martina Rosucci	(Germany) Adidas	Jeep, Visit Detroit	Allianz	TIM	None
Lazio	(Italy) Gianluca Grassadonia	(Italy) Antonietta Castiello	(Japan) Mizuno	TIM	None	None	None
Milan	(Netherlands) Suzanne Bakker	(Scotland) Christy Grimshaw	(Germany) Puma	Banco BPM	TIM	MSC Cruises	None
Napoli	(Italy) David Sassarini	(Italy) Tecla Pettenuzzo	(Italy) Acerbis	Spirulina Becagli	None	None	None
Parma	(Italy) Giovanni Valenti	(Italy) Caterina Ambrosi	(Germany) Puma	inX.aero	Lavoropiù	None	None
Roma	(Italy) Luca Rossettini	(Italy) Manuela Giugliano	(Germany) Adidas	TIM	Auberge Collection	None	HDI Assicurazioni
Sassuolo	(Italy) Salvatore Colantuono	(Scotland) Lana Clelland	(Germany) Puma	Mapei	None	None	None
Ternana	(Italy) Mauro Ardizzone	(Italy) Eleonora Pacioni	(Italy) Macron	Unicusano	None	Connesi	None

=== Managerial changes ===
Team	Outgoing manager	Manner of departure	Date of vacancy	Position in table	Incoming manager	Date of appointment
Ternana	(Italy) Antonio Cincotta	Sacked	27 December 2025	12th	(Italy) Mauro Ardizzone	27 December 2025
Sassuolo	(Italy) Alessandro Spugna	Mutual consent	14 January 2026	9th	(Italy) Salvatore Colantuono	15 January 2026

== League table ==
Pos	Team	Pld	W	D	L	GF	GA	GD	Pts	Qualification
1	Roma (C)	22	17	4	1	44	19	+25	55	Qualification for the Champions League league phase
2	Inter Milan	22	13	5	4	49	26	+23	44	Qualification for the Champions League third qualifying round
3	Juventus	22	11	6	5	33	19	+14	39	Qualification for the Champions League second qualifying round
4	Fiorentina	22	10	6	6	33	30	+3	36	
5	Lazio	22	10	3	9	31	30	+1	33	
6	Milan	22	9	5	8	31	26	+5	32	
7	Napoli	22	8	8	6	30	25	+5	32	
8	Como	22	8	6	8	24	22	+2	30	
9	Sassuolo	22	4	6	12	17	34	−17	18	
10	Ternana	22	4	5	13	19	40	−21	17	
11	Parma	22	2	10	10	16	31	−15	16	
12	Genoa (R)	22	2	4	16	18	43	−25	10	Relegation to Serie B

Source: Soccerway
Rules for classification: 1) Points; 2) Tiebreaker for the Champions League team and the relegated team; 3) Head-to-head points; 4) Head-to-head goal difference; 5) Goal difference; 6) Goals scored; 7) Draw
(C) Champions; (R) Relegated

=== Positions by round ===
Team ╲ Round	1	2	3	4	5	6	7	8	9	10	11	12	13	14	15	16	17	18	19	20	21	22
Roma	2	1	1	1	1	1	1	1	1	1	1	1	1	1	1	1	1	1	1	1	1	1
Inter Milan	1	4	4	8	8	9	7	7	4	2	2	2	2	2	2	2	2	2	2	2	2	2
Juventus	6	9	6	3	6	4	2	3	2	4	3	3	3	3	3	3	3	3	3	3	3	3
Fiorentina	10	10	8	4	2	3	5	4	3	3	4	7	7	6	6	6	6	7	7	6	5	4
Lazio	3	3	2	6	5	7	8	8	5	6	5	6	5	5	5	5	4	6	6	4	4	5
Napoli	5	2	3	2	7	5	3	6	8	8	7	5	4	4	4	4	5	4	4	5	7	6
Milan	4	5	9	5	3	6	6	5	7	7	6	4	6	8	8	8	7	5	5	7	6	7
Como	8	6	10	7	4	2	4	2	6	5	8	8	8	7	7	7	8	8	8	8	8	8
Sassuolo	7	8	7	10	10	11	10	10	9	9	9	10	9	9	9	10	9	11	10	9	9	9
Ternana	12	12	12	12	12	12	12	12	12	12	12	12	12	10	10	9	10	10	11	11	11	10
Parma	11	7	5	9	11	10	9	9	10	10	10	9	10	11	11	11	11	9	9	10	10	11
Genoa	9	11	11	11	9	8	11	11	11	11	11	11	11	12	12	12	12	12	12	12	12	12

Leader and UEFA Champions League league stage
UEFA Champions League third qualifying round
UEFA Champions League second qualifying round
Relegation to the Serie B

Source: Soccerway

== Results ==
Home \ Away	COM	FIO	GEN	INT	JUV	LAZ	MIL	NAP	PAR	ROM	SAS	TER
Como	—	1–3	2–1	2–3	0–2	1–2	1–0	0–0	1–1	0–1	2–0	0–0
Fiorentina	1–0	—	1–1	2–2	1–2	2–1	4–3	1–2	0–0	5–2	3–2	1–0
Genoa	0–1	2–3	—	1–2	0–0	2–5	1–2	1–3	1–0	0–1	0–1	3–1
Inter Milan	0–3	3–0	5–0	—	2–1	5–2	1–0	2–2	0–0	0–1	2–2	5–0
Juventus	0–1	1–0	2–0	3–3	—	0–0	0–1	2–1	3–0	0–1	4–0	2–1
Lazio	1–1	3–0	2–1	0–2	0–1	—	2–2	1–0	1–0	1–2	0–3	2–0
Milan	0–0	0–1	2–1	1–5	2–1	4–2	—	0–0	3–1	1–2	2–2	3–0
Napoli	0–0	1–0	4–1	1–0	2–3	0–1	0–2	—	0–0	1–3	1–1	3–1
Parma	0–1	1–1	1–1	2–3	1–3	1–3	0–0	1–1	—	3–3	2–1	2–0
Roma	4–3	1–1	2–0	3–0	1–1	1–0	1–0	2–2	4–0	—	2–1	2–0
Sassuolo	1–0	0–1	0–0	0–3	0–0	1–2	0–3	0–2	1–0	0–3	—	0–1
Ternana	2–4	2–2	3–1	0–1	2–2	1–0	1–0	3–4	0–0	0–2	1–1	—

Source: Soccerway
Legend: Blue = home team win; Yellow = draw; Red = away team win.
For upcoming matches, an "a" indicates there is an article about the rivalry between the two participants.

=== Results by round ===
Team ╲ Round	1	2	3	4	5	6	7	8	9	10	11	12	13	14	15	16	17	18	19	20	21	22
Como	L	W	L	W	W	W	L	W	L	D	L	D	L	W	W	D	D	L	D	L	D	W
Fiorentina	L	D	W	W	W	D	L	W	W	D	L	L	L	W	W	D	D	L	D	W	W	W
Genoa	L	L	W	L	W	L	L	L	L	D	L	L	L	L	L	D	D	L	L	D	L	L
Inter Milan	W	D	D	L	D	L	W	W	W	W	W	W	W	W	L	W	D	W	W	W	D	L
Juventus	D	L	W	L	L	W	W	D	W	L	W	W	W	D	D	L	D	W	L	W	D	W
Lazio	W	W	L	L	W	L	L	W	W	L	W	D	W	D	D	L	L	L	L	W	W	L
Milan	W	L	L	W	W	L	D	W	L	D	W	W	L	L	D	W	D	W	D	L	W	L
Napoli	W	W	L	W	L	W	W	L	L	D	W	W	W	D	D	W	D	W	D	L	D	D
Parma	L	W	D	D	L	D	D	L	L	D	L	D	L	L	D	D	D	W	D	L	L	L
Roma	W	W	W	W	L	W	W	D	W	W	W	D	W	D	W	D	W	W	W	W	W	W
Sassuolo	D	W	L	L	D	L	D	L	W	L	L	L	W	L	L	L	D	L	W	D	L	D
Ternana	L	L	L	L	L	W	D	L	L	W	L	L	L	W	D	D	D	L	D	L	L	W

Source: Soccerway
W = Win; D = Draw; L = Loss; P = Postponed

== Season statistics ==
=== Top scorers ===
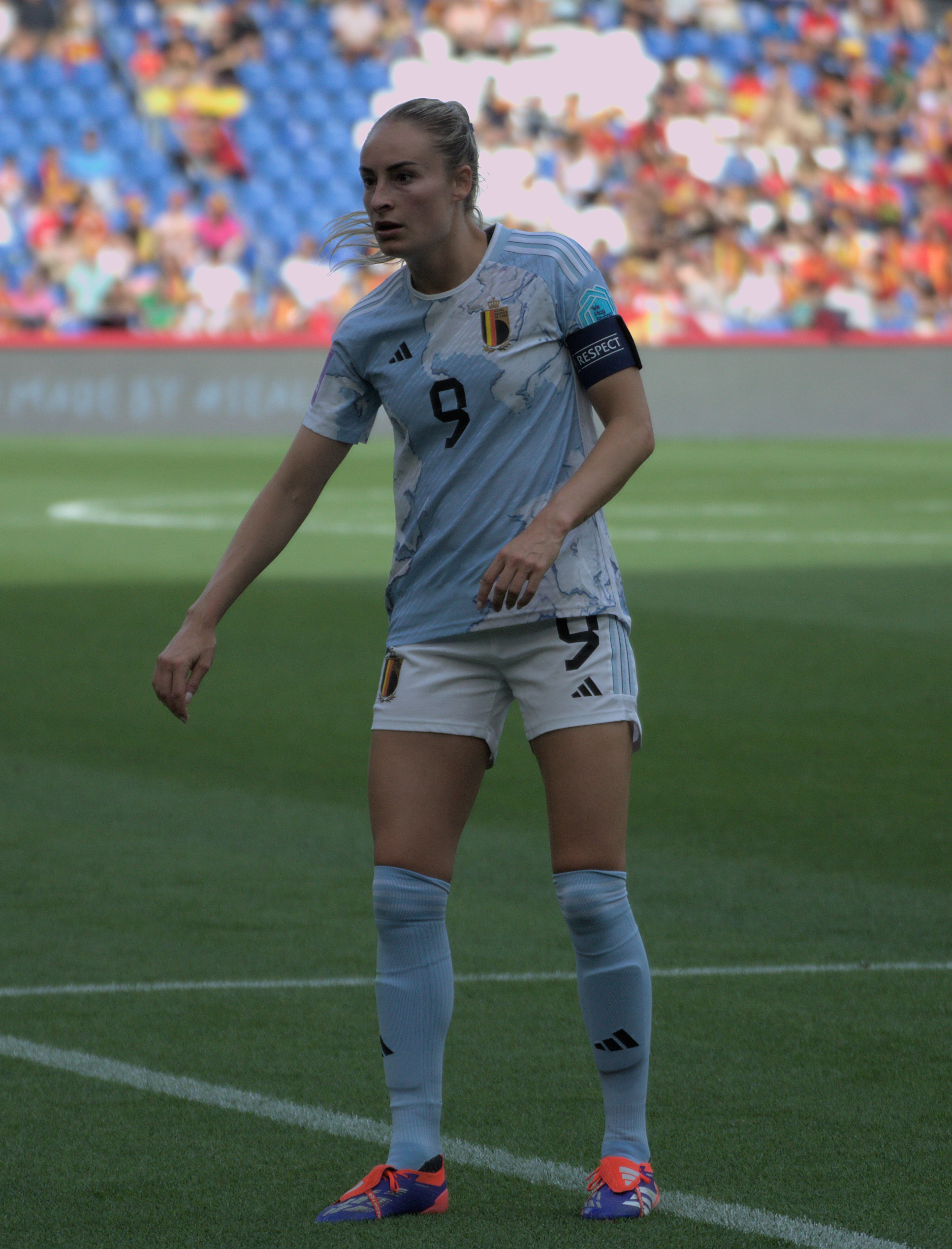
Inter Milan's Tessa Wullaert scored the most goals this season, with 14.

Rank	Player	Club	Goals
1	(Belgium) Tessa Wullaert	Inter Milan	14
2	(Italy) Manuela Giugliano	Roma	12
3	(Denmark) Cecilie Fløe	Napoli	11
4	(Italy) Nadine Nischler	Como	10
4	(Italy) Martina Piemonte	Lazio	10
6	(Malta) Haley Bugeja	Inter Milan	8
6	(Italy) Valeria Pirone	Ternana	8
8	(Italy) Giulia Dragoni	Roma	7
8	(Netherlands) Kayleigh van Dooren	Milan	7
10	(Denmark) Sofie Bredgaard	Fiorentina	6
10	(Norway) Iris Ómarsdóttir	Fiorentina	6

==== Hat-tricks ====
Player	For	Against	Result	Date
(Malta) Haley Bugeja	Inter Milan	Milan	5–1 (A)	13 December 2025
(Italy) Chiara Beccari	Juventus	Sassuolo	4–0 (H)	1 February 2026
(Denmark) Cecilie Fløe	Napoli	Genoa	4–1 (H)	4 April 2026

=== Clean sheets ===
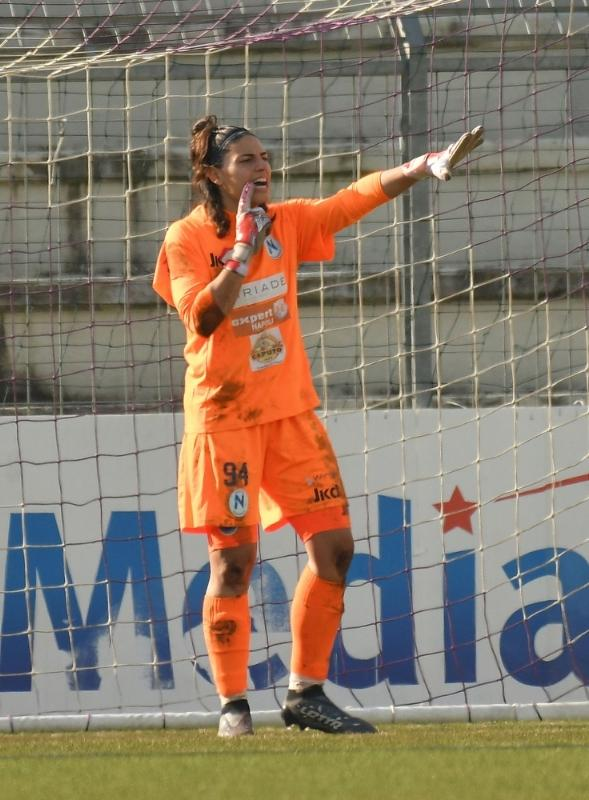
Roma's Rachele Baldi kept the most clean sheets this season, with 11.

Rank	Player	Club	Clean sheets
1	(Italy) Rachele Baldi	Roma	11
2	(Italy) Astrid Gilardi	Como	8
2	(Iceland) Cecilía Rán Rúnarsdóttir	Inter Milan	8
4	(Netherlands) Daniëlle de Jong	Juventus	7
5	(Italy) Beatrice Beretta	Napoli	6
5	(Romania) Camelia Ceasar	Parma	6
5	(Italy) Francesca Durante	Lazio	6
5	(Italy) Laura Giuliani	Milan	6
9	(Norway) Cecilie Fiskerstrand	Fiorentina	5
10	(France) Solène Durand	Sassuolo	4

=== Discipline ===
==== Player ====
- Most yellow cards: 6
  - (Italy) Antonietta Castiello (Lazio)
  - (France) Manon Uffren (Parma)
- Most red cards: 1
  - (Italy) Agnese Bonfantini (Fiorentina)
  - (Italy) Alessia Capelletti (Como)
  - (France) Hawa Cissoko (Parma)
  - (Suriname) Chanté Dompig (Milan)
  - (Australia) Wini Heatley (Roma)
  - (Poland) Nikola Karczewska (Lazio)
  - (Netherlands) Milicia Keijzer (Milan)
  - (Denmark) Agnete Marcussen (Como)
  - (Bosnia and Herzegovina) Marija Milinković (Inter Milan)
  - (Italy) Eleonora Pacioni (Ternana)
  - (Italy) Martina Piemonte (Lazio)
  - (Italy) Francesca Quazzico (Ternana)
  - (Italy) Flaminia Simonetti (Lazio)
  - (Netherlands) Kayleigh van Dooren (Milan)

==== Club ====
- Most yellow cards: 31
  - Lazio
- Most red cards: 3
  - Lazio
  - Milan
- Fewest yellow cards: 18
  - Roma
- Fewest red cards: 0
  - Genoa
  - Juventus
  - Napoli
  - Sassuolo

== Awards ==
=== Seasonal awards ===
Award	Winner	Club	Ref.
Most Valuable Player	(Italy) Manuela Giugliano	Roma	
Best Young Player	(Spain) Estela Carbonell	Juventus	
Best Goalkeeper	(Italy) Astrid Gilardi	Como	
Best Defender	(Nigeria) Shukurat Oladipo	Roma	
Best Midfielder	(Italy) Giulia Dragoni	Roma	
Best Forward	(Belgium) Tessa Wullaert	Inter Milan	

Team of the Season
Goalkeeper	(Italy) Astrid Gilardi (Como)			
Defenders	(Italy) Caterina Ambrosi (Parma)	(Spain) Ivana Andrés (Inter Milan)	(Nigeria) Shukurat Oladipo (Roma)	(Spain) Estela Carbonell (Juventus)
Midfielders	(Italy) Giulia Dragoni (Roma)	(Italy) Giada Greggi (Roma)		(Italy) Manuela Giugliano (Roma)
Forwards	(Denmark) Cecilie Fløe (Napoli)	(Italy) Martina Piemonte (Lazio)		(Belgium) Tessa Wullaert (Inter Milan)

Team of the Season (Under-23)
Goalkeeper	(Italy) Beatrice Beretta (Napoli)			
Defenders	(Italy) Caterina Venturelli (Sassuolo)	(Italy) Federica D'Auria (Lazio)	(Bosnia and Herzegovina) Marija Milinković (Inter Milan)	(Italy) Emma Lombardi (Fiorentina)
Midfielders	(Italy) Maya Cherubini (Fiorentina)		(Italy) Eva Schatzer (Juventus)	
Forwards	(Malta) Haley Bugeja (Inter Milan)	(Italy) Giada Pellegrino Cimò (Ternana)	(Italy) Alice Corelli (Roma)	(Norway) Thea Kyvåg (Milan)
