= Astrid Gilardi =

Italian footballer (born 2003)

Personal information
- Full name: Astrid Gilardi
- Date of birth: 19 February 2003 (age 23)
- Place of birth: Lecco, Italy
- Height: 1.71 m (5 ft 7 in)
- Position: Goalkeeper

Team information
- Current team: FC Como
- Number: 22

Youth career
- 2017–2020: Inter Milan

Senior career*
Years	Team	Apps	(Gls)
2020–2024	Inter Milan	4	(0)
2023–2024	→ FC Como (loan)	6	(0)
2024–	FC Como	44	(0)

International career^{‡}
2018–2019	Italy U17	3	(0)
2021–2022	Italy U19	3	(0)
- * Club domestic league appearances and goals as of 9 May 2026 ‡ National team caps and goals as of 12 March 2023

Astrid Gilardi (born 19 February 2003) is an Italian professional footballer who plays as a goalkeeper for the Serie A club FC Como.

== Early life ==
Gilardi was born in 2003. She started her youth career in the Polisportiva Mandello school of football. She played in a team made up entirely of boys. In 2014, she moved to ASD Real Meda and played with the Women's team for three seasons.

== Club career ==
In 2017, she joined Inter Milan where she spent time developing in both the Primavera and the First team.

In 2021, Gilardi signed a new contract with Inter, agreeing to stay with the team until at least 2024. In 2022, she suffered a shoulder injury.

On 14 August 2024, Gilardi signed a three-year contract with FC Como.

== International career ==
Gilardi was called up to the Italy Under 16s Team in 2017, and immediately moved up to the Italy Under 17s Team in 2018 and later the Under 19 team. She is yet to make an appearance for the Italy National Team.

== Style of play ==
Gilardi is known for her technical ability as a goalkeeper.

== Honours ==
Individual

- Serie A Best Goalkeeper: 2025–26
- Serie A Team of the Season: 2025–26
