= Matilde Macera =

Italian footballer (born 2002)

Personal information
- Date of birth: 21 November 2002 (age 23)
- Place of birth: Genoa, Italy
- Height: 1.67 m (5 ft 6 in)
- Position: Goalkeeper

Team information
- Current team: Catania
- Number: 71

Youth career
- 2016–2018: Genoa Cricket

Senior career*
Years	Team	Apps	(Gls)
2019-2025	Genoa	90	(-116)
2025-	Catania	19	(-13)
- * Club domestic league appearances and goals as of 26 May 2026

Matilde Macera (born 21 November 2002) is an Italian footballer who plays as a goalkeeper for Catania in the Italian Serie B.

== Career ==
Matilde Macera has always played for Genoa CFC Women since this team exists. She is the goalkeeper with the three longest unbeaten streaks in the club's history.

Macera played almost all matches of all seasons between 2019 and 2023, becoming then the backup goalkeeper due to the loan of Camilla Forcinella from Juventus during 2023–2024 and 2024–2025 seasons.

In 2023-2024 she played two matches in a row obtaining two clean sheets.

After signing a two-year contract extension with Genoa, she was loaned to Catania, in Serie C, during the summer of 2025.

With Catania, as the starting goalkeeper and thanks to 13 clean sheets in 19 league matches, and 2 clean sheets in 2 play-off games, she achieved promotion to Serie B thanks to the play-off final won on penalties against Südtirol, 0–0 (5–3), on 24 May 2026.

In the summer of 2026, she joined Catania on a permanent transfer.

== Career statistics ==
As of 26 May 2026

Season	Team	Competition			Domestic Cup			European			Total	
Season	Team	Comp	League	Goals	Comp	Pres	Reti	Comp	Pres	Reti	Pres	Reti
2019-2020	(Italy) Genoa	Ecc.	7	-1	CIE	3	-1	-	-	-	10	-2
2020-2021	(Italy) Genoa	C	19	-23	CIC	1	-2	-	-	-	20	-25
2021-2022	(Italy) Genoa	C	30	-27	CIC	3	-7	-	-	-	33	-34
2022-2023	(Italy) Genoa	B	29	-59	CI	1	-3	-	-	-	30	-62
2023-2024	(Italy) Genoa	B	2	0	CI	0	0	-	-	-	2	0
2024-2025	(Italy) Genoa	B	2	-3	CI	0	0	-	-	-	2	-3
Total Genoa			90	-113		8	-13				98	-126
2025-2026	Catania	C	19+2	-13	CI	6	-6	-	-	-	25	-19
Total Career			111	-126		14	-19		-	-	123	-145
