= Sorbi =

Sorbi may refer to:

== People ==
- Attilio Sorbi (born 1959), Italian football manager and player
- Raffaello Sorbi (1844–1931), Italian painter

== Species ==
- Phyllonorycter sorbi, species of moth
- Stigmella sorbi, species of moth
