= Martina Piemonte =

Italian footballer (born 1997)

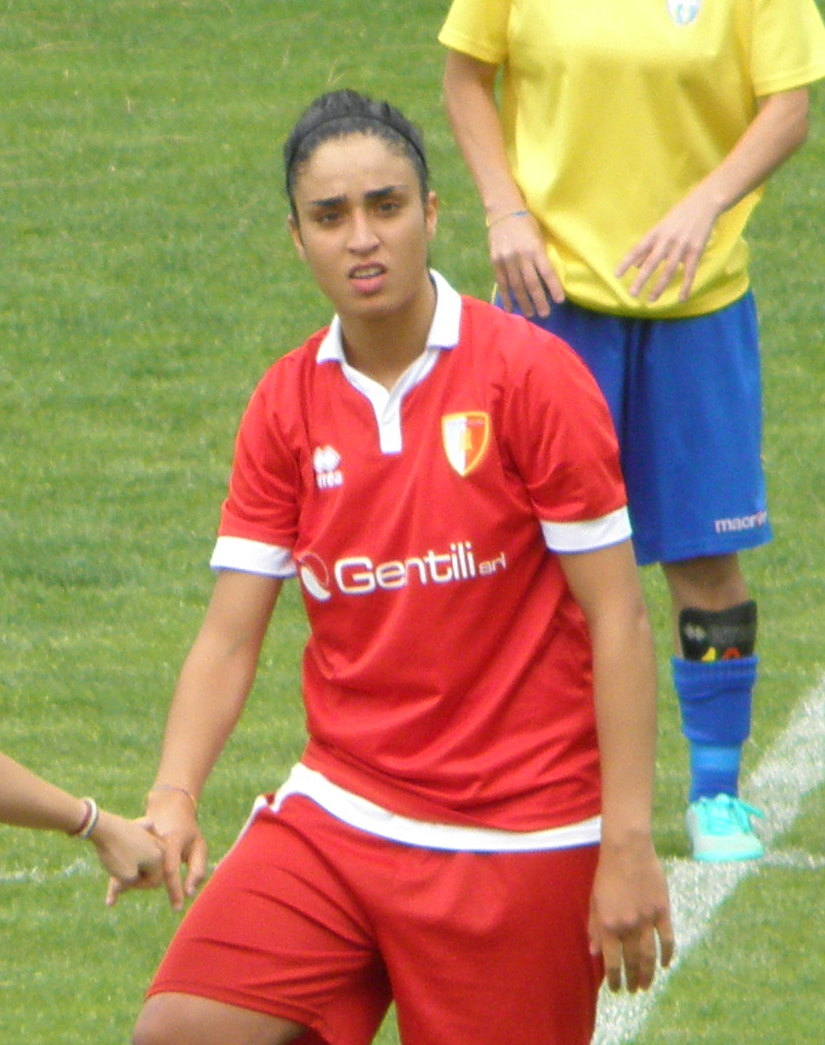
- Piemonte with USD San Zaccaria in 2015

Personal information
- Date of birth: 7 November 1997 (age 28)
- Place of birth: Ravenna, Italy
- Height: 1.78 m (5 ft 10 in)
- Position: Striker

Team information
- Current team: Roma
- Number: 18

Senior career*
Years	Team	Apps	(Gls)
2012–2014	ASD Riviera di Romagna	29	(10)
2014–2016	USD San Zaccaria	43	(28)
2016–2017	ASDCF Verona	19	(11)
2017–2018	Sevilla	20	(6)
2018–2019	Roma	17	(3)
2019–2020	Real Betis	16	(3)
2020–2021	Fiorentina	18	(0)
2021–2023	AC Milan	28	(14)
2023–2024	Everton	19	(3)
2024–2026	Lazio	41	(26)
2026–	Roma	1	(1)

International career^{‡}
2012–2014	Italy U17	21	(1)
2014–2016	Italy U19	10	(3)
2018	Italy U23	2	(0)
2014–	Italy	33	(5)
- * Club domestic league appearances and goals as of 20:52, 3 October 2026 (UTC) ‡ National team caps and goals as of 9 October 2026

Martina Piemonte (born 7 November 1997) is an Italian professional footballer who plays as a striker for Serie A club Roma and the Italy women's national team. She previously played for her hometown club Riviera di Romagna and for San Zaccaria.

== Club career ==
Piemonte was considered a prodigy in Italian women's football. She signed a professional contract with Riviera di Romagna in 2012 at the age of 14, before leaving for San Zaccaria following the 2014 FIFA U-17 Women's World Cup.

On 15 July 2016, Piemonte joined AGSM Verona from San Zaccaria.

In July 2017, Piemonte signed for Sevilla F.C. women, to play in the Spanish La Liga. In April 2018, she terminated her contract early with the club.

In July 2019, Piemonte was announced at Real Betis on a permanent transfer.

In July 2020, Piemonte was announced at Fiorentina.

On 30 December 2021, Piemonte was announced at AC Milan on a one and a half year contract.

On 5 July 2023, Piemonte was announced at Everton on a two-year contract. In joining, Piemonte became the second Italian to ever play in the Women's Super League, only behind her fellow Everton teammate Aurora Galli.

On 27 August 2024, Piemonte was announced at Lazio on a permanent transfer.

On 27 July 2026, Piemonte signed a three-year contract with Roma.

== International career ==
Piemonte was a member of the Italian women's U-17 squad and played at the 2014 FIFA U-17 Women's World Cup, in which her country finished in third place.

On 26 June 2022, Piemonte was announced in the Italy squad for the UEFA Women's Euro 2022.

On 25 June 2025, Piemonte was called up to the Italy squad for the UEFA Women's Euro 2025.

== International goals ==
No.	Date	Venue	Opponent	Score	Result	Competition
1.	11 December 2016	Arena da Amazônia, Manaus, Brazil	Costa Rica	2–0	3–0	2016 Torneio Internacional de Manaus de Futbol
2.	10 July 2022	New York Stadium, Rotherham, England	France	1–5	1–5	UEFA Women's Euro 2022
3.	7 March 2026	Stadio Romeo Menti, Vicenza, Italy	Denmark	1–0	1–1	2027 FIFA Women's World Cup qualification
4.	9 June 2026	Gamla Ullevi, Gothenburg, Sweden	Sweden	2–0	2–2	2027 FIFA Women's World Cup qualification
5.	9 October 2026	David Petriashvili Stadium, Tbilisi, Georgia	Belarus	1–0	2–0	2027 FIFA Women's World Cup qualification play-offs

== Personal life ==
Piemonte is in a relationship with Lea Schüller.

== Honours ==
Individual

- Serie A Team of the Season: 2024–25, 2025–26
