= Cecilia Prugna =

Italian footballer (born 1997)

Personal information
- Date of birth: 7 November 1997 (age 29)
- Place of birth: Pisa, Italy
- Position: Midfielder

Team information
- Current team: Parma
- Number: 37

Senior career*
Years	Team	Apps	(Gls)
2012–2016	Castelfranco	62	(15)
2016–2022	Empoli	123	(39)
2022–2023	AS Roma	0	(0)
2022–2023	→ Sampdoria (loan)	13	(0)
2023–2025	→ Sassuolo (loan)	14	(0)
2025–	Parma		

International career^{‡}
2021–	Italy	1	(0)
- * Club domestic league appearances and goals as of 17 February 2024 ‡ National team caps and goals as of 18:29, 2 July 2021 (UTC)

Cecilia Prugna (born 7 November 1997) is an Italian footballer who plays as a midfielder for Parma.

== Club career ==
On 2 July 2021, Prugna renewed her contract with Empoli, keeping her with the club for the 2021–22 season. After six season playing with Empoli, during summer 2022 moved to Sampdoria, on loan from AS Roma.

== International career ==
Prugna made her debut for the Italy national team on 10 April 2021, coming on as a substitute for Melissa Bellucci against Iceland.
