= Marta Mascarello =

Italian footballer

Personal information
- Date of birth: 15 October 1998 (age 28)
- Place of birth: Bra, Italy
- Height: 1.60 m (5 ft 3 in)
- Position: Midfielder

Team information
- Current team: Milan

Senior career*
Years	Team	Apps	(Gls)
2016–2017	Cuneo	18	(2)
2017–2019	Tavagnacco	39	(4)
2019–2022	Fiorentina	22	(3)
2022–	Milan	36	(2)

International career^{‡}
2013–2015	Italy U17	9	(2)
2015–2017	Italy U19	13	(3)
2018–2019	Italy U23	2	(0)
2019–	Italy	4	(0)
- * Club domestic league appearances and goals as of 15:12, 19 July 2024 (UTC) ‡ National team caps and goals as of 19:00, 1 February 2021 (UTC)

Marta Mascarello (born 15 October 1998) is an Italian footballer who plays as a midfielder for Milan, on loan from Fiorentina, and the Italy women's national team.

== Career ==
She made her debut for the Italy national team on 4 March 2020 in the Algarve Cup against Portugal, coming on as a substitute.

== Personal life ==
Mascarello is originally from Bra and, as of 2019, resides in Monticello d'Alba.
