= Camilla Forcinella =

Italian footballer (born 2001)

Personal information
- Date of birth: 22 June 2001 (age 25)
- Place of birth: Trento, Italy
- Position: Goalkeeper

Team information
- Current team: Inter Milan

Senior career*
Years	Team	Apps	(Gls)
2016–2018	Verona	1	(0)
2018–2020	Hellas Verona	34	(0)
2020–2022	Fiorentina	1	(0)
2022	→ Juventus	0	(0)
2022–2025	Juventus	1	(0)
2023–2025	→ Genoa (on loan)	28	(0)
2025–2026	Genoa	46	(0)
2026–	Inter Milan	0	(0)

International career^{‡}
2016–2018	Italy U17	23	(-32)
2018–2019	Italy U19	11	(-15)
2023–	Italy U23	5	(-9)
2025–	Italy	0	(0)
- * Club domestic league appearances and goals as of 1 September 2024 ‡ National team caps and goals as of 1 September 2024

Camilla Forcinella (born 22 June 2001) is an Italian professional footballer who plays as goalkeeper for Serie A club Inter Milan. She has also represented her country in youth level.

== Career ==
=== Club ===
Camilla Forcinella made her senior debut for AGSM Verona in the Serie A at the age of 16. After Verona was acquired by Hellas Verona FC in 2018, she became the first-choice goalkeeper, making 37 total appearances and conceding 83 goals in the following two seasons.

On 29 July 2020, she joined Fiorentina. In the 2020/21 season, she only made 3 appearances and, on 12 January 2022, she joined Juventus on loan. After they won the 2021/22 Serie A, she joined Juventus permanently, making her debut on 5 January 2023 in a Coppa Italia match against Cittadella. On 19 July 2023, she joined Serie B club Genoa on loan until the end of the 2023/24 season.

On 11 July 2026, it was announced that Forcinella had signed a three-year contract with Inter Milan, running until 30 June 2029.

=== International ===
Forcinella made her debut for the Italian U17 team against Portugal on 28 October 2016 at the 2017 UEFA Women's Under-17 Championship qualification. She also competed in the 2018 edition as well as the 2018 UEFA Women's Under-17 Championship. In total, she made 7 appearances and kept 3 clean sheets.

She made her debut for the Italian U19 team in a 4–0 win over Romania on 4 October 2018 at the 2019 UEFA Women's Under-19 Championship qualification. She also competed in the 2020 edition.

== Honours ==
Juventus

- Serie A (1): 2021/22
- Coppa Italia (2): 2021/22, 2022/23
