= 2024–25 Première Ligue =

51st season of top French women's football league

Première Ligue
- Season: 2024–25
- Dates: 20 September 2024 – 16 May 2025
- Champions: Lyon (18th title)
- Relegated: Reims; Guingamp
- Champions League: Lyon; Paris Saint-Germain; Paris FC
- Matches: 132
- Goals: 437 (3.31 per match)
- Top goalscorer: Clara Matéo (18 goals)
- Biggest home win: Lyon 11–0 Saint-Étienne (16 November 2024)
- Biggest away win: Guingamp 0–8 Lyon (8 November 2024)
- Highest scoring: Lyon 11–0 Saint-Étienne (16 November 2024)
- Longest winning run: Lyon (14 matches)
- Longest unbeaten run: Lyon (22 matches)
- Longest winless run: Guingamp (14 matches)
- Longest losing run: Guingamp (14 matches)
- Highest attendance: 20,489; Paris Saint-Germain 0–2 Lyon (18 January 2025) (after 84 matches)
- Lowest attendance: 177; Reims 1–2 Saint-Étienne (21 September 2024); Reims 0–0 Strasbourg (14 December 2024) (after 84 matches)
- Total attendance: 142,634 (after 84 matches)
- Average attendance: 1,698 (after 84 matches)
- All statistics correct as of 7 May 2025.

The 2024–25 Première Ligue season, also known as Arkema Première Ligue for sponsorship reasons, was the 51st season of top national women's football league in France and the first season since its rebranding as Première Ligue.

Lyon were the defending champions, having won their record-extending 17th title in the 2023–24 season.

The season began on 20 September 2024 and ended on 16 May 2025 with the play-off final.

After a 4–0 win over Fleury on 30 March 2025, Lyon mathematically defended their first place finish, and qualified for the playoffs. They went on to defend their title, defeating Dijon in the semifinals and Paris Saint-Germain in the final.

== Teams ==
Location of teams in 2024–25 Arkema Première Ligue

Team	Manager	Home ground	Capacity	2023–24 season
Dijon	Sébastien Joseph	Stade Gaston Gérard, Dijon	20,000	8th
Fleury	Frédéric Biancalani	Stade Auguste Gentelet, Fleury-Mérogis	2,000	5th
Guingamp	Jérôme Bonnet	Stade de l'Akademi EA Guingamp, Pabu	1,960	10th
Le Havre	Maxime Di Liberto	Stade Océane, Le Havre	25,178	9th
Lyon	Joe Montemurro	Groupama OL Training Center, Décines-Charpieu	1,524	1st
Montpellier	Yannick Chandioux	Stade Bernard Gasset - Mama Ouattara Field, Montpellier	1,280	6th
Nantes	Nicolas Chabot	Stade Marcel-Saupin, Nantes	1,880	D2F, 2nd (promoted)
Paris FC	Sandrine Soubeyrand	Stade Robert Bobin, Bondoufle	18,845	3rd
Paris Saint-Germain	Fabrice Abriel	Stade Municipal Georges Lefèvre, Saint-Germain-en-Laye	2,164	2nd
Reims	Mathieu Rufié	Stade Louis Blériot, Bétheny	500	4th
Saint-Étienne	Laurent Mortel	Stade Salif Keïta, Saint-Étienne	1,000	7th
Strasbourg	Vincent Nogueira	Stade Jean-Nicolas Muller, Strasbourg	1,000	D2F, 1st (promoted)

=== Team changes ===
Entering league	Exiting league
Promoted from 2023–24 Division 2	Relegated to 2024–25 Seconde Ligue
Nantes; Strasbourg	Bordeaux; Lille

== Regular season ==
=== Standings ===
Pos	Team	Pld	W	D	L	GF	GA	GD	Pts	Qualification or relegation
1	Lyon (C)	22	20	2	0	92	7	+85	62	Qualification for the play-offs
2	Paris Saint-Germain	22	16	4	2	57	14	+43	52	Qualification for the play-offs
3	Paris FC	22	13	6	3	58	19	+39	45	Qualification for the play-offs
4	Dijon	22	13	4	5	40	24	+16	43	Qualification for the play-offs
5	Fleury	22	9	6	7	40	30	+10	33	
6	Montpellier	22	10	3	9	34	36	−2	33	
7	Nantes	22	5	8	9	17	30	−13	23	
8	Le Havre	22	5	6	11	22	42	−20	21	
9	Strasbourg	22	3	8	11	22	39	−17	17	
10	Saint-Étienne	22	5	2	15	16	62	−46	17	
11	Reims (R)	22	4	3	15	24	49	−25	15	Relegation to the Seconde Ligue
12	Guingamp (R)	22	3	0	19	15	85	−70	9	Relegation to the Seconde Ligue

Source: FFF.fr
Rules for classification: 1) points; 2) head-to-head points; 3) head-to-head goal difference; 4) goal difference; 5) goals scored
(C) Champions; (R) Relegated

=== Results ===
Home \ Away	DIJ	FLE	GUI	LHV	LYO	MON	NAN	PFC	PSG	REI	SET	STR
Dijon	—	2–2	4–0	4–2	0–3	4–2	3–0	6–0	0–1	2–1	1–0	1–0
Fleury	0–0	—	4–1	2–0	2–6	1–2	4–0	1–4	0–0	4–1	6–0	1–1
Guingamp	0–3	0–6	—	0–1	0–8	3–1	0–1	0–6	2–6	1–4	3–2	3–2
Le Havre	0–2	0–0	2–1	—	0–3	0–1	0–1	0–2	2–2	0–3	5–1	1–1
Lyon	2–0	4–0	7–0	2–0	—	4–0	5–1	2–2	1–0	8–1	11–0	6–0
Montpellier	0–0	0–1	7–0	1–3	1–4	—	1–0	2–0	1–3	1–0	1–0	0–0
Nantes	0–2	0–0	2–1	2–2	0–2	2–2	—	0–0	0–1	1–1	0–1	0–0
Paris FC	4–0	4–0	6–0	8–0	0–0	4–2	0–0	—	1–1	3–2	4–0	3–1
Paris Saint-Germain	6–1	2–1	4–0	3–0	0–2	4–1	1–0	0–0	—	6–0	6–0	4–0
Reims	0–2	0–1	1–0	1–1	0–3	2–4	1–3	0–3	1–2	—	1–2	0–0
Saint-Étienne	0–2	3–2	2–0	1–2	0–5	0–2	2–2	1–0	0–3	0–3	—	1–1
Strasbourg	1–1	0–2	6–0	1–1	0–4	1–2	1–2	1–4	1–2	2–1	2–0	—

Source: FFF.fr
Legend: Blue = home team win; Yellow = draw; Red = away team win.

== Play-offs ==
The top four teams from the regular season qualify for the play-offs. In the semi-finals, the team that finished first plays the team which finished fourth. Rest of the two teams would face each other.

The winner of the play-offs is crowned the champion for the 2024–25 season and secures the first qualification spot for the 2025–26 Champions League. The remaining two qualification spots are given to the two best-ranked teams based on the regular season standings (excluding the play-off winner). The first two spots are for the league phase while the third spot is for the third qualifying round.

Semi-finals
1	Lyon	4
4	Dijon	1
2	Paris Saint-Germain	3
3	Paris FC	0

Final
Lyon	3
Paris Saint-Germain	0

=== Semi-finals ===
11 May 2025
15:15 CEST

Lyon	4–1	Dijon
Le Sommer 19'; Heaps 45+2'; Gilles 63'; Hegerberg 89'	Report 1 Report 2	Pinther 90'

Parc Olympique Lyonnais, Décines-Charpieu
Attendance: 4,130
Referee: Maika Vanderstichel
11 May 2025
21:00 CEST

Paris Saint-Germain	3–0	Paris FC
Leuchter 2'; Karchaoui 55'; Albert 90+1'	Report 1 Report 2

Parc des Princes, Paris
Attendance: 5,567
Referee: Victoria Beyer

=== Final ===
16 May 2025
21:00 CEST

Lyon	3–0	Paris Saint-Germain
Dumornay 45+3'; Diani 80'; Renard 90+4' (pen.)	Report 1 Report 2

Parc Olympique Lyonnais, Décines-Charpieu
Attendance: 10,658
Referee: Alexandra Collin

== Season statistics ==
=== Top scorers ===
As of 7 May 2025

Rank	Player	Club	Goals
1	(France) Clara Matéo	Paris FC	18
2	(Haiti) Melchie Dumornay	Lyon	15
3	(France) Marie-Antoinette Katoto	Paris Saint-Germain	12
4	(France) Kessya Bussy	Paris FC	11
4	(United States) Lindsey Heaps	Lyon	11
6	(France) Kadidiatou Diani	Lyon	10
6	(Poland) Klaudia Jedlińska	Dijon	10
8	(Haiti) Batcheba Louis	Fleury	9
8	(Mali) Aissata Traoré	Fleury	9
10	(France) Eugénie Le Sommer	Lyon	8
10	(Netherlands) Romée Leuchter	Paris Saint-Germain	8

=== Most clean sheets ===
As of 7 May 2025

Rank	Player	Club	Clean sheets
1	(Chile) Christiane Endler	Lyon	14
2	(Nigeria) Chiamaka Nnadozie	Paris FC	11
3	(France) Constance Picaud	Fleury	10
4	(England) Mary Earps	Paris Saint-Germain	9
5	(Finland) Katriina Talaslahti	Dijon	8
6	(France) Justine Lerond	Montpellier	7
7	(Canada) Emily Burns	Nantes	6
8	(France) Manon Wahl	Strasbourg	5
9	(France) Alice Pinguet	Dijon	4
10	(Germany) Laura Benkarth	Lyon	3
10	(France) Maryne Gignoux-Soulier	Saint-Étienne	3
10	(France) Élisa Launay	Reims	3

=== Hat-tricks ===
Player	Club	Against	Result	Date
(France) Clara Matéo^{4}	Paris FC	Le Havre	8–0 (H)	29 September 2024
(Malawi) Tabitha Chawinga	Lyon	Guingamp	8–0 (A)	8 November 2024
(France) Marie-Antoinette Katoto	Paris Saint-Germain	Strasbourg	4–0 (H)	9 November 2024
(United States) Lindsey Horan^{4}	Lyon	Saint-Étienne	11–0 (H)	16 November 2024
(France) Clara Matéo	Paris FC	Fleury	4–1 (A)	24 November 2024
(Haiti) Batcheba Louis	Fleury	Saint-Étienne	6–0 (H)	17 January 2025
(France) Kessya Bussy	Paris FC	Guingamp	6–0 (H)	18 January 2025
(France) Kadidiatou Diani	Lyon	Guingamp	7–0 (H)	15 February 2025
(France) Judith Coquet	Montpellier	Reims	4–2 (A)	1 March 2025
(Nepal) Sabitra Bhandari	Guingamp	Saint-Étienne	3–2 (H)	7 May 2025

(H) – Home; (A) – Away
^{4} – Player scored four goals.

== Awards ==
=== Player of the Month ===
Month	Winner	Club	Ref.
September 2024	(United States) Lindsey Horan	Lyon	
October 2024	(France) Manon Uffren	Nantes	
November 2024	(France) Clara Matéo	Paris FC	
December 2024	(France) Clara Matéo	Paris FC	
January 2025	(France) Kessya Bussy	Paris FC	
February 2025	(France) Sakina Karchaoui	Paris Saint-Germain	
March 2025	(Haiti) Melchie Dumornay	Lyon	

=== UNFP Annual Awards ===
These awards are presented by Union Nationale des Footballeurs Professionnels. Nominations were announced on 30 April 2025. Winners along with the Team of the Year were announced on 11 May.

Award	Winner	Club
Best Player	(France) Clara Mateo	Paris FC
Best Young Player	(France) Tara Elimbi Gilbert	Paris Saint-Germain
Best Goalkeeper	(Chile) Christiane Endler	Lyon

Team of the Year
Goalkeeper	(Chile) Christiane Endler (Lyon)			
Defenders	(Australia) Ellie Carpenter (Lyon)	(France) Tara Elimbi Gilbert (Paris Saint-Germain)	(Canada) Vanessa Gilles (Lyon)	(France) Wendie Renard (Lyon)
Midfielders	(Netherlands) Damaris Egurrola (Lyon)	(United States) Lindsey Horan (Lyon)	(France) Sakina Karchaoui (Paris Saint-Germain)	(France) Kessya Bussy (Paris FC)
Forwards	(Haiti) Melchie Dumornay (Lyon)		(France) Clara Mateo (Paris FC)	

=== LFFP Annual Awards ===
These awards are presented by Ligue féminine de football professionnel. Nominations were announced on 24 April 2025. Winners along with the Team of the Season were announced on 28 April.

Award	Winner	Club
Best Player	(France) Clara Mateo	Paris FC
Best Young Player	(France) Tara Elimbi Gilbert	Paris Saint-Germain
Best Goalkeeper	(Chile) Christiane Endler	Lyon
Best Manager	(France) Sandrine Soubeyrand	Paris FC
Goal of the Season	(France) Manon Uffren	Nantes

Team of the Season
Goalkeeper	(Chile) Christiane Endler (Lyon)			
Defenders	(Australia) Ellie Carpenter (Lyon)	(Canada) Vanessa Gilles (Lyon)	(France) Wendie Renard (Lyon)	(France) Tara Elimbi Gilbert (Paris Saint-Germain)
Midfielders	(France) Kessya Bussy (Paris FC)	(United States) Lindsey Horan (Lyon)	(Netherlands) Damaris Egurrola (Lyon)	(France) Sakina Karchaoui (Paris Saint-Germain)
Forwards	(France) Clara Mateo (Paris FC)		(Haiti) Melchie Dumornay (Lyon)	

== See also ==
- 2024–25 Coupe de France Féminine
- 2024–25 Seconde Ligue
