= Angelica Soffia =

Italian footballer (born 2000)

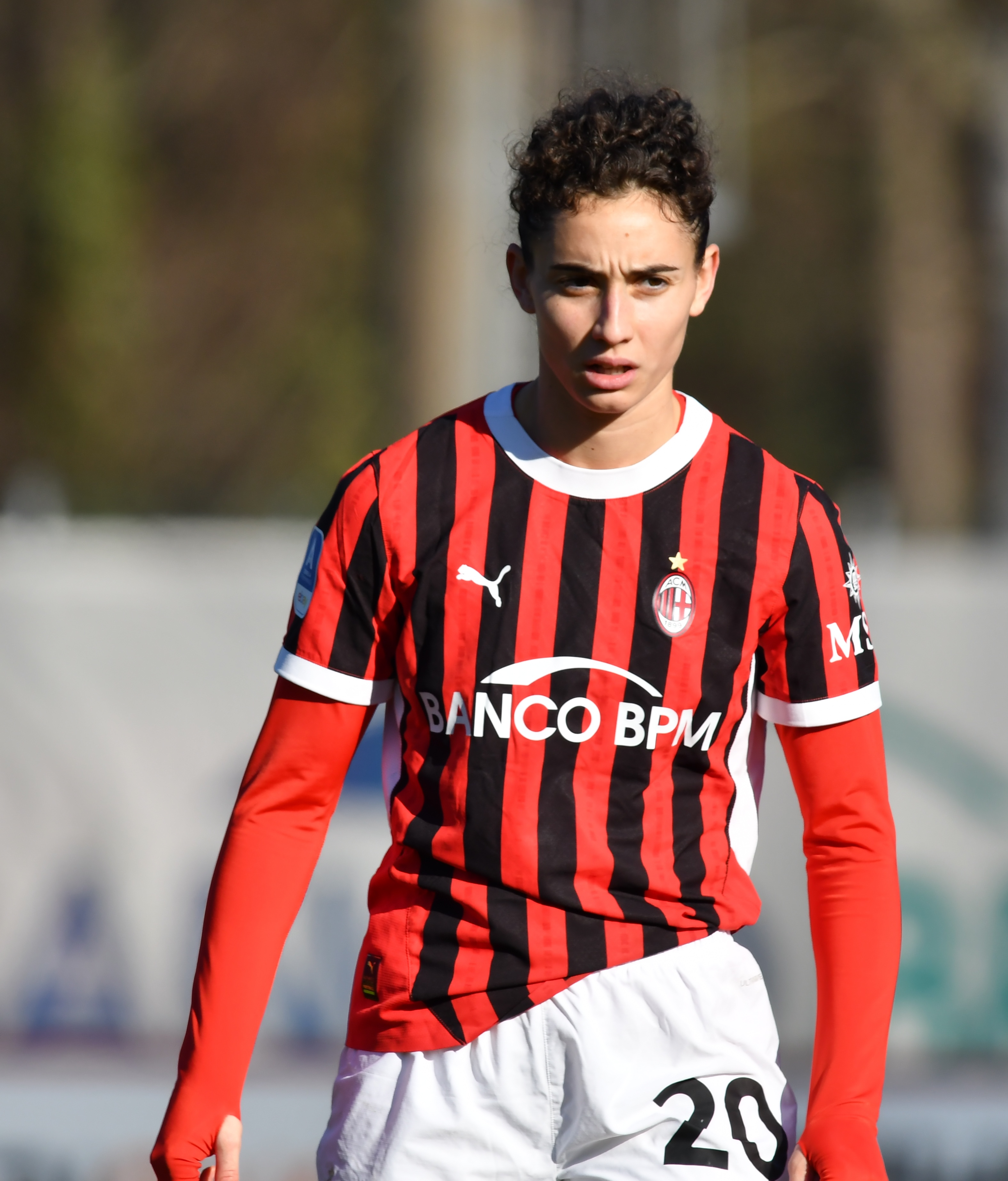

Personal information
- Date of birth: 2 July 2000 (age 26)
- Place of birth: Abano Terme, Italy
- Height: 1.66 m (5 ft 5 in)
- Position: Right back

Team information
- Current team: AC Milan
- Number: 20

Senior career*
Years	Team	Apps	(Gls)
2016–2018	Verona	42	(5)
2018–2022	Roma	65	(0)
2022–	AC Milan	37	(2)

International career
2016	Italy U16	3	(1)
2015–2017	Italy U17	11	(2)
2017–2018	Italy U19	11	(0)
2021–	Italy	9	(2)
- * Club domestic league appearances and goals as of 19 July 2024

Angelica Soffia (born 2 July 2000) is an Italian professional footballer who plays as a right back for Serie A club AC Milan and the Italy women's national team. She previously played for AGSM Verona, AS Roma and has represented her country at all youth levels, becoming a senior international player for Italy in 2021.

== Club career ==
Soffia began playing football in the youth ranks of the Godigese men's team and took part in inter-gender training sessions during her stay with the club. In 2015, Soffia was signed by AGSM Verona after the club's scouts watched her in regional tournaments for several months.

On 6 February 2016, Soffia played her first women's Serie A match in a 3–0 away victory against San Bernardo Luserna. She made six other appearances that season, losing also the 2016 Coppa Italia Final. On 28 September, Soffia won the 2016 Supercoppa Italiana after a 2–0 win against Brescia. On 5 October, Soffia played against BIIK Kazygurt in the 2016–17 UEFA Champions League which was lost 3–1. After Verona witnessed a big squad turnover in the summer of 2017, Soffia was installed as club captain for the 2017–18 season because she was one of the few players who remained from the previous league campaign. On 28 January 2017, Soffia scored her first women's Serie A goal, coming in the 74th minute via penalty kick in a 9–0 victory over Jesina.

Her performances for the club in the 2017–18 season led to Soffia winning an award at the 18th edition of the Gran Galà del Calcio ceremony. The newly formed A.S. Roma women's team would sign Angelica Soffia, along with fellow Verona player Emma Lipman, for Roma's inaugural 2018–19 Serie A league campaign.

Soffia made her Roma debut at right-back in the club's first Serie A league game away to Sassuolo. She also showed herself as a capable left-back who could share game time with Roma's club captain Elisa Bartoli down the left flank. Despite showing promise and versatility, Soffia would spend most of her sophomore season on the substitutes' bench behind 2019 summer signing Kaja Eržen. Soffia continued to improve her game under the tutelage of coach Elisabetta Bavagnoli, until Soffia would make the definitive jump to first-team regular in third season with Roma.

The 2020–21 season saw Soffia enjoy more league starts in a Roma shirt than she would ever previously racked up to date, while her performances in Roma's victorious 2021 Coppa Italia campaign proved crucial to the team's success. Soffia's build-up play through all channels of the pitch and her overall playmaking, particularly in the Coppa Italia semi-final tie against Juventus, were some of the highlights of her season. Five years after Soffia had finished a Coppa Italia runner-up, the Italian player started and won the 2021 Coppa Italia with the Giallorosse. On 21 July 2021, Soffia committed her future to Roma by signing a contract extension with the club through to the summer of 2023.

== International career ==
Soffia's performances did not go unnoticed by Italy's national team coach Milena Bertolini, who called up Soffia to make her senior debut for her country on 13 April 2021. After representing Italy at all ranks of youth football, Angelica Soffia won her first senior international cap for Italy on 13 April 2021, in a 1–0 victory over Iceland. Soffia then started at right-back for Italy in a 1–0 friendly win over the Netherlands the next month in June 2021. In just her third appearance for Italy, Soffia scored a brace in a 3–2 victory against Austria on 14 June 2021.

== International goals ==
No.	Date	Venue	Opponent	Score	Result	Competition
1.	14 June 2021	Wiener Neustadt Arena, Wiener Neustadt, Austria	Austria	1–0	3–2	Friendly
2.	14 June 2021	Wiener Neustadt Arena, Wiener Neustadt, Austria	Austria	2–1	3–2	Friendly
