= Estela Carbonell =

Spanish footballer (born 2004)

Personal information
- Full name: Estela Carbonell Nuñez
- Date of birth: 18 October 2004 (age 22)
- Place of birth: Valencia, Spain
- Height: 1.69 m (5 ft 7 in)
- Position: Left-back

Team information
- Current team: Juventus
- Number: 3

Youth career
- Deportivo La Salle
- Valencia
- 2020–2021: Levante

Senior career*
Years	Team	Apps	(Gls)
2020–2021	Levante B	17	(1)
2022–2025	Levante	55	(5)
2025–	Juventus	17	(2)

International career^{‡}
2022–2023	Spain U19	12	(2)
2024	Spain U20	4	(0)
Medal record
Women's football
Representing Spain
UEFA Women's Under-19 Championship
Winner	2023 Belgium
- * Club domestic league appearances and goals as of 19:50, 1 July 2026 (UTC) ‡ National team caps and goals as of 16:29, 30 November 2025 (UTC)

Estela Carbonell Nuñez (born 18 October 2004) is a Spanish professional footballer who plays as a left-back for Serie A club Juventus. She has previously played in the Liga F for Levante UD.

== Early life ==
Carbonell was born in Valencia and went to school in the neighborhood of Paterna. She started playing football as a child for local club Deportivo La Salle, also dabbling in futsal along the way. At age 11, Carbonell had a successful tryout with Valencia CF and was accepted to join her hometown club. In the summer of 2020, she moved to Levante UD's reserve team.

== Club career ==
=== Levante ===
At age 16, Carbonell made her senior debut for Levante against Athletic Bilbao. After spending the majority of the 2021–22 season with the reserve squad, she signed a three-year contract with Levante's first team on 16 March 2022 that lasted through the summer of 2025. In her first full season with the Levante senior squad, Carbonell contributed to a third-place finish in the Liga F that helped the club gain entry to the 2023–24 UEFA Women's Champions League qualifying rounds. Once Levante's two qualifiers rolled around the following year, Carbonell was an available option, but teammate Paula Tomás was preferred in both matches as Levante failed to advance to the main tournament.

In the 2024–25 season, Levante struggled to evade relegation to the Primera Federación. Carbonell was a key contributor throughout the year, racking up one of the highest minute counts on the team and recording both 3 goals and 3 assists. One of her goals was a crucial game-winner against Deportivo de La Coruña that helped Levante put more distance between themselves and the relegation line. At the end of the season, Carbonell chose to depart from Levante in search for a new challenge. She had made over 70 appearances for the club across all competitions.

=== Juventus ===
On 21 May 2025, Carbonell penned a three-year contract with Serie A club Juventus; She became the first-ever Spanish player to sign for the Italian side. Carbonell received lots of playing time in Juventus' 2025–26 preseason friendlies, including in a game against Everton in which she scored a goal. On 7 October 2025, she made her Juventus and UEFA Women's Champions League debuts, playing all 90 minutes of a 2–1 victory over Portuguese champions Benfica. She scored her first competitive goal for Juventus on 23 November, recording a stoppage-time game-winner against Fiorentina that helped her team ascend two places in the Serie A standings. At the end of her first season with Juventus, Carbonell was named to the Serie A's team of the season and recognized as the league's best under-23 player.

== International career ==
Carbonell is a youth international for Spain, having played for both the Spanish under-19 and under-23 teams. She was a member of the team that won the 2023 UEFA Women's Under-19 Championship in Belgium.

One year later, Carbonell was named to the Spanish squad that participated in the 2024 FIFA U-20 Women's World Cup. She put in solid defensive performances to help Spain win all 3 of its group stage matches. In the third game, versus Morocco, she was named Player of the Match. Spain were ultimately eliminated in the quarterfinals of the tournament by Japan.

== Career statistics ==
=== Club ===
As of 1 July 2026

Appearances and goals by club, season and competition
Club	Season	League			Cups		Continental		Total	
Club	Season	Division	Apps	Goals	Apps	Goals	Apps	Goals	Apps	Goals
Levante UD	2020–21	Liga F	1	0	0	0	0	0	1	0
Levante UD	2021–22	Liga F	4	0	0	0	0	0	4	0
Levante UD	2022–23	Liga F	16	0	1	0	0	0	17	0
Levante UD	2023–24	Liga F	24	2	1	0	0	0	25	2
Levante UD	2024–25	Liga F	26	3	2	0	0	0	28	3
Levante UD	Total		55	5	4	0	0	0	59	5
Juventus	2025–26	Serie A	17	2	9	0	8	0	34	2
Career total			72	7	13	0	8	0	93	7

=== Youth ===
As of match played 16 September 2024

Appearances and goals by national youth team and year
National team	Year	Apps	Goals
Spain U16	2020	1	0
Spain U19	2022	3	1
Spain U19	2023	9	1
Spain U20	2024	4	0
Total		17	2

== Honours ==
Spain U19

- UEFA Women's Under-19 Championship: 2023

Juventus

- Serie A Women's Cup: 2025, 2026
- Supercoppa Women: 2025

Individual

- Serie A Best Young Player: 2025–26
- Serie A Team of the Season: 2025–26
