= Federica D'Auria =

Italian footballer (born 2003)

Personal information
- Date of birth: 27 August 2003 (age 23)
- Place of birth: Turin, Italy
- Height: 1.77 m (5 ft 10 in)
- Position: Centre-back

Team information
- Current team: Juventus
- Number: 27

Youth career
- Rapid Torino
- 2017–2023: Juventus

Senior career*
Years	Team	Apps	(Gls)
2023–	Juventus	2	(0)
2023–2024	→ Cesena (loan)	29	(5)
2024–2026	→ Lazio (loan)	43	(1)

International career^{‡}
2018	Italy U16	5	(1)
2022-	Italy U23	2	(0)
2025–	Italy	3	(0)
- * Club domestic league appearances and goals as of 4 October 2026 (UTC) ‡ National team caps and goals as of 2 December 2025

Federica D'Auria (born 27 August 2003) is an Italian professional footballer who plays as a Centre-back for Serie A club Juventus and the Italy women's national team.

== Club career ==
=== Juventus ===
D'Auria joined Juventus in the summer of 2017, first in the youth sector and then in the first team from the 2023 season.

On 19 August 2026, she extended her contract with Juventus until 30 June 2029.

== International career ==
D'Auria has represented Italy at youth and senior level.

== Honours ==
Juventus

- Serie A Women's Cup: 2026

Individual

- Serie A Team of the Season (Under-23): 2025–26
