= Sally Rainey =

American soccer player (born 2002)

Personal information
- Full name: Sally Ann Rainey
- Date of birth: December 19, 2002 (age 23)
- Height: 5 ft 8 in (1.73 m)
- Position: Goalkeeper

Team information
- Current team: AC Milan
- Number: 24

Youth career
- FC Stars

College career
Years	Team	Apps	(Gls)
2021–2024	New Hampshire Wildcats	37	(0)
2025	Indiana Hoosiers	15	(0)

Senior career*
Years	Team	Apps	(Gls)
2026	Red Star Belgrade	9	(0)
2026–	AC Milan	0	(0)
- * Club domestic league appearances and goals as of May 9, 2026

Sally Ann Rainey (born December 19, 2002) is an American professional soccer player who plays as a goalkeeper for Serie A Women club AC Milan. She played college soccer for the New Hampshire Wildcats and the Indiana Hoosiers. She began her professional career with Serbian club Red Star Belgrade in 2026.

== Early life ==
Rainey grew up in West Lebanon, New Hampshire. She attended Lebanon High School, where she played soccer and basketball. She captained both teams and garnered all-state recognition in both sports. She played ECNL club soccer for FC Stars. She committed to play college soccer for the New Hampshire Wildcats.

== College career ==
After two years primarily as Cat Sheppard's backup, Rainey became the starting goalkeeper for the New Hampshire Wildcats in her junior year in 2023. She started all 16 games and led the America East Conference with 8 clean sheets, being named the America East Goalkeeper of the Year. In her senior year in 2024, she started all 18 games and led the conference with 9 clean sheets (matching a program record) and 0.78 goals against average. She was named America East Goalkeeper of the Year for the second time and left New Hampshire as the program leader in career goals against average.

Rainey transferred to the Indiana Hoosiers for her graduate year in 2025. Most of the season she platooned with Dani Jacobson, coming on as a halftime substitute. She made 15 appearances and allowed three more goals than Jacobson while leading the team in saves.

== Club career ==
Rainey began her professional career with Serbian club Red Star Belgrade. She made her professional debut in their first league fixture of the year, starting in a 4–1 win against Vojvodina on February 21, 2026. She remained the starter for the rest of the season, helping lead Red Star to their third consecutive league championship. She also helped the club win the Serbian Women's Cup, keeping a clean sheet in a 2–0 victory over Spartak in the final.

On July 27, 2026, Rainey signed a three-year contract with Italian club AC Milan. She joined the club as backup to Spanish starter Sandra Estevez.

== Personal life ==
Rainey is the daughter of Margaret and Ron Rainey and has two siblings. Her father has been the head women's soccer coach at Albion College since 2023. He was previously the head coach at Wisconsin–Parkside, Towson, Ball State, Iowa, and Dartmouth.

== Honors and awards ==
New Hampshire Wildcats

- America East Conference tournament: 2022

Red Star Belgrade

- Serbian Women's Super League: 2025–26
- Serbian Women's Cup: 2026

Individual

- America East Conference Goalkeeper of the Year: 2023, 2024
