= Iris Rabot =

French footballer (born 2000)

Personal information
- Full name: Iris Madeleine Rabot
- Date of birth: 16 October 2000 (age 26)
- Place of birth: Lyon, France
- Height: 1.63 m (5 ft 4 in)
- Position: Midfielder

Team information
- Current team: Parma
- Number: 7

College career
Years	Team	Apps	(Gls)
2018	Northwestern Ohio Racers	20	(14)
2019–2021	James Madison Dukes	46	(6)

Senior career*
Years	Team	Apps	(Gls)
2022–2024	Pomigliano	43	(2)
2024–	Parma	35	(4)
- * Club domestic league appearances and goals as of 17 May 2026

Iris Madeleine Rabot (born 16 October 2000) is a French professional footballer who plays as a midfielder for Serie A club Parma.

== Club career ==
On 17 July 2024, Rabot joined Parma.
