= Italy women's national football team =

Women's association football team

Italy
- Nickname(s): Le Azzurre (The Blues)
- Association: Italian Football Federation (FIGC)
- Confederation: UEFA (Europe)
- Head coach: Andrea Soncin
- Captain: Cristiana Girelli
- Most caps: Patrizia Panico (204)
- Top scorer: Patrizia Panico (110)
- Home stadium: Various
- FIFA code: ITA
First colours	Second colours

FIFA ranking
- Current: 14 ▼1 (20 October 2026)
- Highest: 10 (July 2003 – September 2006; August 2012)
- Lowest: 19 (March 2017)

First international
- Italy 2–1 Czechoslovakia (Viareggio, Italy; 23 February 1968)

Biggest win
- Italy 15–0 North Macedonia (Vercelli, Italy; 17 September 2014)

Biggest defeat
- Denmark 6–0 Italy (Ringsted, Denmark; 16 May 1982); Italy 0–6 Switzerland (Larnaca, Cyprus; 6 March 2017)

World Cup
- Appearances: 4 (first in 1991)
- Best result: Quarter-finals (1991, 2019)

European Championship
- Appearances: 13 (first in 1984)
- Best result: Runners-up (1993, 1997)

The Italy women's national football team (Italian: Nazionale di calcio femminile dell'Italia) has represented Italy in international women's football since their inception in 1968. The team is controlled by the Italian Football Federation (FIGC), the governing body for football in Italy.

Formed in 1968, Italy took part in various unofficial international tournaments, hosting the first unofficial European Competition in 1969 and World Cup in 1970. Italy qualified for both the first World Cup in 1991, where they reached the quarter-finals, and the first European Championship. While Italy were runners-up in the European Championship in 1993 and 1997, they are yet to replicate similar success at the World Cup. In 2019, after a 20-year drought, Italy qualified for the World Cup where they equaled their previous best performance, reaching the quarter-finals.

== History ==
=== 1968–1984: Early history and unofficial tournaments ===
The women's national team played its first game on 23 February 1968, in Viareggio against Czechoslovakia. However, the national team was not yet part of the Italian Women's Football Federation, which was founded on 11 March in Viareggio. From the beginning, they took part in various continental and international tournaments in Europe and in the world, also achieving good successes. With the birth of the European Competition for Women's Football (1984), organized by UEFA, and later the Women's World Cup, organized by FIFA, the highest international women's competitions became equivalent to the men's competitions.

After its debut in 1968, the Italy national team took to the field to compete in other non-official international friendlies and tournaments, such as the European Competition in 1969 that saw it win the final over Denmark, the World Cup in 1970 that saw it lose the final against the aforementioned Danish national team, competitions both organized in Italy, and the Mundial in Mexico in 1971 where they achieved third place. In 1979, Italy hosted, and participated in the unofficial European Competition, reaching the final again, which took place at the San Paolo Stadium in Naples, and in which Denmark triumphed again. Between 1981 and 1988 there were five editions of the Mundialito, an international invitation-only tournament, one of the most prestigious events in the women's football scene before the advent of the World Cup. Apart from the first edition in 1981 that was organized in Japan, the next four were organized in Italy, where the Italy national team obtained three victories and two second places overall. The triumphs arrived in 1981, winning the group, in 1984 overcoming West Germany in the final and in 1986 overcoming the United States in the final, while in the other two editions it lost the final against England.

=== 1984–1991: First World Cup and European Championship ===
In 1984, UEFA organized the first European Competition. Italy won Group 3 of the qualifiers, being one of four teams to qualify for the final round. Italy faced Sweden, being defeated both in the first leg, played at the Flaminio Stadium in Rome in front of 10,000 spectators, and in the return match in Linköping. In 1987, Italy again gained access to the European Competition, winning Group 4 of the qualifiers. In the final stage organized in Norway, Italy were defeated in the semi-final against the host nation, but achieved third place by defeating England, with goals by Carolina Morace and Elisabetta Vignotto. Italy were also confirmed in the 1989 edition, having passed the qualifying phase with a play-off win against France. Italy finished fourth in the tournament, having lost the semi-final against West Germany after a penalty shoot-out, as well as in the third place match against Sweden after extra time.

In the 1991 European Championship, Italy was once again admitted to the four-team finals, after having won the qualifying play-off against the Sweden. In the final tournament, Italy repeated what had happened two years before, losing both the semi-final against the German hosts and the final for third place against Denmark, although even with the fourth-place finish, gained access to the first edition of the World Cup organized by FIFA in the same year. The world championship was organized in China, as Italy was drawn into Group 3 together with Germany, Chinese Taipei and Nigeria. Italy ended the group in second place with two victories against Taipei and Nigeria and a defeat against Germany; all four goals for the team came from Carolina Morace. Italy advanced to the quarter-finals, where they were defeated by Norway 3–2 after extra time.

=== 1993–1999: Twice European Championship runners-up ===
The 1993 European Championship was hosted in Italy. After defeating England in the final play-off match, Italy overcame Germany in the semi-finals after a penalty shoot-out. In the final, played at the Manuzzi Stadium in Cesena, Italy was defeated 1–0 by Norway. Norway also denied Italy a place at the 1995 European Championship, with a 7–3 aggregate loss in the qualifying play-offs. Consequently, Italy also didn't qualify for the 1995 World Cup.

Italy participated in the 1997 European Championship, with the number of teams participating in the competition increasing from four to eight. In Group B, Italy defeated Norway and drew against Denmark and Germany, still achieving first in the group advancing to the knockout stage. In the semi-final Italy beat Spain 2–1, but in the final, were defeated 2–0 by Germany. In 1998, Italy qualified for the World Championship for the second time. The 1999 edition took place in the United States, with Italy being drawn in Group B along with Brazil, Germany and Mexico. After a 1–1 draw against Germany in the debut match, Italy lost 2–0 to Brazil, and ended the group with a 2–0 victory over Mexico; Italy finishing third in the group and were eliminated.

=== 2000–2011: Decline ===
With the beginning of the 2000s, a decline in the performance of the Italy national team began. At the 2001 European Championship, Italy, coached by Carolina Morace, were eliminated in the group stage due to a worse goal difference compared to Norway.

Four years later, at the 2005 European Championship, Italy finished last in its group with zero points, losing all three of their matches against Germany, Norway and France, conceding twelve goals overall. Redemption came in the 2009 edition, with Italy defeating both England and Russia, advancing to the knock-out stage as second-placed in the group behind Sweden who had defeated them. In the quarter-finals, Italy faced Germany, where they lost 2–1; Germany would ultimately win their seventh continental title.

Having failed to qualify for the 2003 and 2007 editions of the World Cup, Italy also failed to qualify for the 2011 edition in the intercontinental two-legged play-off between UEFA and CONCACAF. The United States won the first leg 1–0 in Padua with a goal by Alex Morgan in the fourth minute of added time, while they also won the second leg by a score of 1–0 in Bridgeview with a goal by Amy Rodriguez in the first half.

=== 2011–2017: Slim World Cup qualification miss ===
Italy qualified for the 2013 European Championship in Sweden by winning the qualifying group with nine victories out of ten matches. At the tournament, Italy was drawn in Group A with hosts Sweden, Denmark and Finland. With one win, one draw and one defeat, Italy advanced from the group stage to the quarter-finals in second place, but were defeated 1–0 by Germany.

In the following two years, Italy, led by Antonio Cabrini, was involved in the qualification for the 2015 World Championship: despite eight victories out of ten games, including two record victories against North Macedonia (11–0 and 15–0), they finished in second place in Group 2 behind Spain, sending Italy to the play-offs. In the first round of the play-offs, Italy defeated Ukraine 4–3 on aggregate, but were defeated by the Netherlands 3–2 on aggregate in the final round of the play-offs.

Italy qualified for the 2017 European Championship second in its group behind Switzerland. At the European Championship, Italy finished in last place in Group B behind Germany, Sweden and Russia, despite the victory in the third game against Sweden.

=== 2017–2023: First World Cup qualification in 20 years ===
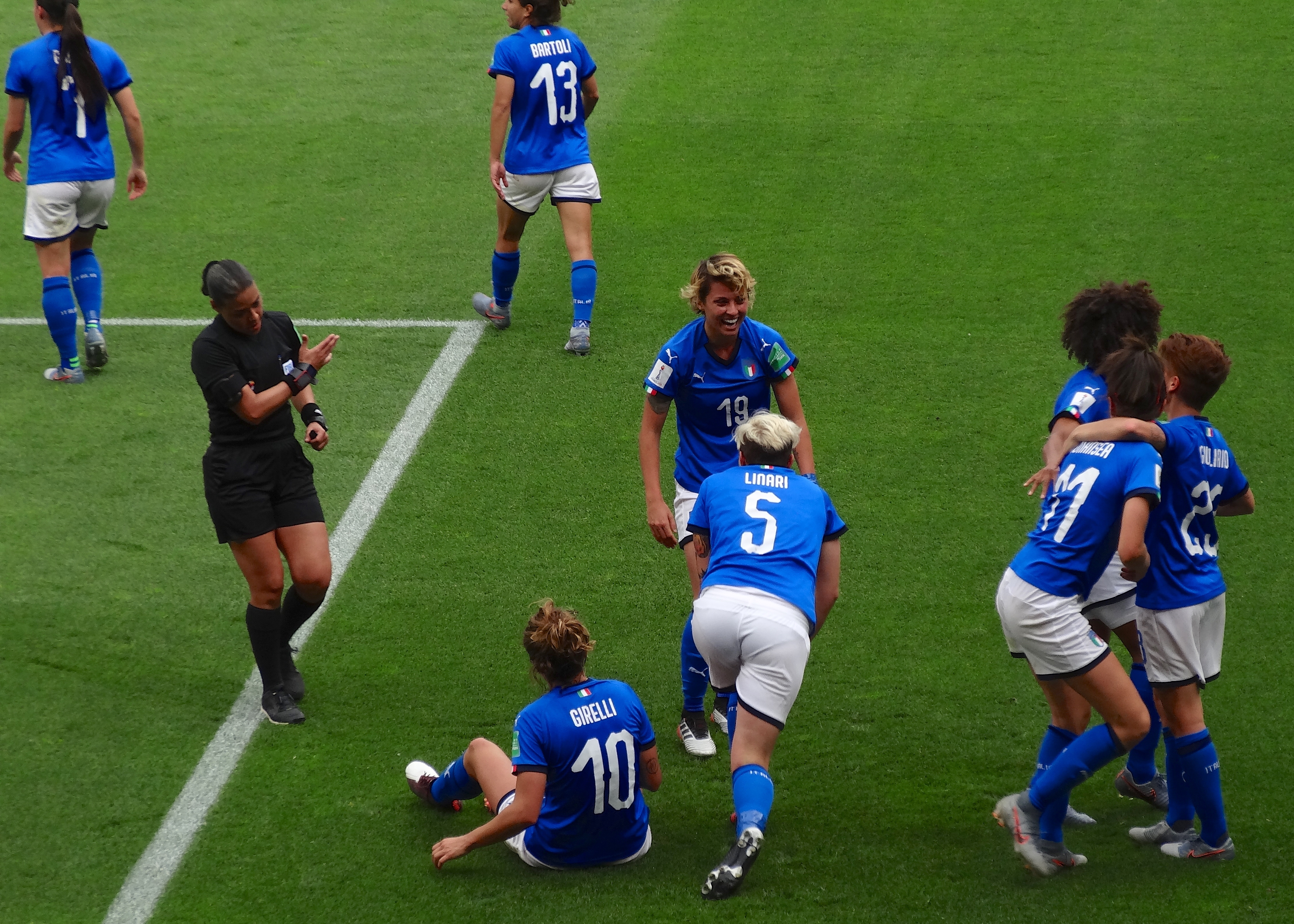
Italy during 2019 FIFA Women's World Cup match against Australia.

On 8 June 2018, twenty years since their last participation, Italy qualified for the 2019 FIFA World Cup, winning its qualifying group with a game in hand. In the group stage of the tournament, Italy won Group C, recording two victories against Australia (2–1) and Jamaica (5–0), which guaranteed advancement to the knockout stage, with Italy's defeat to Brazil (0–1) irrelevant to the final table. In the round of 16, Italy won 2–0 over China, advancing to the quarter-finals for the second time in their history. However, with a 2–0 defeat to European Champions the Netherlands, Italy's World Cup journey came to an end on 29 June 2019. The following year, Italy advanced to the final of the 2020 Algarve Cup (and the first Algarve Cup final of their history) but Italy had to withdraw the match due to the COVID-19 pandemic in Italy and Germany were declared as winners. In the 2022 Algarve Cup, Italy managed to reach the final again but lost against Sweden 6–5 at the penalty shoot-outs after the 1–1 draw after the extra-time.

However, Italy failed to produce the same form in the UEFA Women's Euro 2022, finishing bottom with only one point and one goal scored, though much blames were taken for the Serie A having not gone professional until the end of the tournament. After that failure, Italy qualified for the 2023 FIFA Women's World Cup by winning two games against Moldova and Romania with the team now fully recognised professional, finishing top of the group in the qualifiers, ahead of Switzerland, which was rather an irony after the men's team fell victim to the same Swiss opponents in the 2022 FIFA World Cup qualifiers.

== Results and fixtures ==
The following is a list of match results in the last 12 months, as well as any future matches that have been scheduled.

Legend

Win Draw Loss Fixture

=== 2025 ===
28 November Friendly	United States	3–0	Italy	Orlando, United States
19:00 UTC−5	Moultrie 2'; Macario 64', 76'	Report		Stadium: Inter&Co Stadium; Attendance: 14,199; Referee: Sandra Benitez (El Salvador)

1 December Friendly	United States	2–0	Italy	Fort Lauderdale, United States
19:00 UTC−5	Macario 20'; Shaw 41'	Report		Stadium: Chase Stadium; Attendance: 9,471; Referee: Priscilla Perez (Mexico)

=== 2026 ===
3 March 2027 FIFA Women's World Cup qualification	Italy	0–1	Sweden	Reggio Calabria, Italy
18:15		Report	Angeldahl 22'	Stadium: Stadio Oreste Granillo; Attendance: 6,008; Referee: Olatz Rivera Olmedo (Spain)

7 March 2027 FIFA Women's World Cup qualification	Italy	1–1	Denmark	Vicenza, Italy
18:15	Piemonte 19'	Report	Holdt 63'	Stadium: Stadio Romeo Menti; Attendance: 5,278; Referee: Désirée Blanco (Switzerland)

14 April 2027 FIFA Women's World Cup qualification	Serbia	0–6	Italy	Leskovac, Serbia
18:15		Report (FIFA); Report (UEFA)	Girelli 20'; Oliviero 36'; Lenzini 45'; Caruso 61'; Cantore 88'; Greggi 90+4'	Stadium: Dubočica Stadium; Attendance: 686; Referee: Eleni Antoniou (Greece)

18 April 2027 FIFA Women's World Cup qualification	Denmark	0–0	Italy	Copenhagen, Denmark
15:00		Report (FIFA); Report (UEFA)		Stadium: Parken Stadium; Attendance: 12,013; Referee: Emanuela Rusta (Albania)

5 June 2027 FIFA Women's World Cup qualification	Italy	3–0	Serbia	Pisa, Italy
18:15	Bergamaschi 61'; Caruso 81'; Bonansea 88'	Report		Stadium: Arena Garibaldi; Referee: Lina Lehtovaara (Finland)

9 June 2027 FIFA Women's World Cup qualification	Sweden	2–2	Italy	Gothenburg, Sweden
19:00	Giuliani 70' (o.g.); Rolfo 73'	Report	Oliviero 36'; Piemonte 45'	Stadium: Gamla Ullevi; Referee: Iuliana Demetrescu (Romania)

9 October 2027 FIFA Women's World Cup play-offs	Belarus	0–2	Italy	Tbilisi, Georgia (Note: Due to Belarusian involvement in the Russian invasion of Ukraine, Belarus are required to play their home matches at neutral venues, and behind closed doors, until further notice.)
18:15 (20:15 UTC+4)		Report (FIFA); Report (UEFA)	Piemonte 66'; Polli 90+1'	Stadium: David Petriashvili Stadium; Attendance: 0 (Note: behind closed doors); Referee: Maika Vanderstichel (France)

13 October 2027 FIFA Women's World Cup play-offs	Italy	1–1	Belarus	Florence, Italy
18:15	Bonansea 9'	Report (FIFA); Report (UEFA)	Olkhovik 75'	Stadium: Stadio Artemio Franchi; Referee: Abigail Byrne (England)

1 December 2027 FIFA Women's World Cup play-offs	Finland	v	Italy

5 December 2027 FIFA Women's World Cup play-offs	Italy	v	Finland

- globalsportsarchive Italy

== Coaching staff ==
Position	Staff
Head coach	(Italy) Andrea Soncin
Assistant coach	Vacant
Technical assistant	Vacant
Goalkeeping coaches	Vacant
Fitness coaches	Vacant
Match analysts	Vacant
Head of delegation	(Italy) Gianluigi Buffon
Doctors	Vacant
Physiotherapists	Vacant
Osteopath	Vacant
Nutritionist	Vacant

=== Managerial history ===
Year(s)	Manager
1969–1971	Giuseppe Cavicchi
1972–1978	Amedeo Amadei
1979–1981	Sergio Guenza
1981–1982	Paolo Todeschini
1982–1984	Enzo Benedetti
1984–1989	Ettore Recagni
1989–1993	Sergio Guenza
1993–1995	Comunardo Niccolai
1995–1997	Sergio Guenza
1997–1998	Sergio Vatta
1999	Carlo Facchin
1999–2000	Ettore Recagni
2000–2005	Carolina Morace
2005–2012	Pietro Ghedin
2012–2017	Antonio Cabrini
2017–2023	Milena Bertolini
2023–	Andrea Soncin

== Players ==
=== Current squad ===
The following players were called up for the 2027 FIFA Women's World Cup qualification matches against Serbia and Sweden on 5 and 9 June 2026, respectively.

Information correct as of 9 June 2026, after the match against Sweden.

No.	Pos.	Player	Date of birth (age)	Caps	Goals	Club
1	GK	Laura Giuliani	5 June 1993 (age 33)	110	0	(German Football Association) VfB Stuttgart
12	GK	Rachele Baldi	2 October 1994 (age 32)	1	0	(Italian Football Federation) Roma
22	GK	Francesca Durante	12 February 1997 (age 29)	15	0	(Italian Football Federation) Lazio
	GK	Margot Shore	15 March 1997 (age 29)	0	0	(French Football Federation) Marseille
2	DF	Valentina Bergamaschi	22 January 1997 (age 29)	68	9	(Italian Football Federation) Roma
3	DF	Lucia Di Guglielmo	26 June 1997 (age 29)	45	2	(United States Soccer Federation) Washington Spirit
4	DF	Elisabetta Oliviero	18 July 1997 (age 29)	21	3	(Italian Football Federation) Lazio
5	DF	Elena Linari (captain)	15 April 1994 (age 32)	126	6	(The Football Association) London City Lionesses
5	DF	Federica D'Auria	27 August 2003 (age 23)	3	0	(Italian Football Federation) Lazio
13	DF	Elisa Bartoli	7 May 1991 (age 35)	96	3	(Italian Football Federation) Inter Milan
15	DF	Angelica Soffia	2 July 2000 (age 26)	17	2	(Italian Football Federation) AC Milan
17	DF	Lisa Boattin	3 May 1997 (age 29)	73	1	(United States Soccer Federation) Houston Dash
19	DF	Martina Lenzini	23 July 1998 (age 28)	53	1	(Italian Football Federation) Juventus
23	DF	Cecilia Salvai	2 December 1993 (age 32)	73	3	(Italian Football Federation) Juventus
4	MF	Eva Schatzer	16 January 2005 (age 21)	9	0	(Italian Football Federation) Juventus
6	MF	Manuela Giugliano	18 August 1997 (age 29)	103	11	(Italian Football Federation) Roma
8	MF	Emma Severini	18 July 2003 (age 23)	18	3	(Italian Football Federation) Fiorentina
16	MF	Giulia Dragoni	7 November 2006 (age 20)	25	0	(Italian Football Federation) Roma
18	MF	Arianna Caruso	6 November 1999 (age 27)	71	18	(German Football Association) Bayern Munich
20	MF	Giada Greggi	18 February 2000 (age 26)	42	3	(Italian Football Federation) Roma
	MF	Melissa Bellucci	8 February 2001 (age 25)	2	0	(Italian Football Federation) Napoli
7	FW	Sofia Cantore	30 September 1999 (age 27)	49	6	(United States Soccer Federation) Washington Spirit
9	FW	Martina Piemonte	7 November 1997 (age 29)	33	5	(Italian Football Federation) Lazio
10	FW	Cristiana Girelli	23 April 1990 (age 36)	132	62	(United States Soccer Federation) Bay FC
11	FW	Barbara Bonansea	13 June 1991 (age 35)	120	33	(Italian Football Federation) Juventus
14	FW	Benedetta Glionna	26 July 1999 (age 27)	27	1	(Italian Football Federation) Inter Milan
14	FW	Margherita Monnecchi	6 November 2001 (age 25)	1	0	(Italian Football Federation) Fiorentina
21	FW	Michela Cambiaghi	4 February 1996 (age 30)	26	5	(Italian Football Federation) Juventus
	FW	Noemi Visentin	5 May 2000 (age 26)	0	0	(Italian Football Federation) Lazio

=== Recent call-ups ===
The following players have been called up to the national team in the past 12 months but are not part of the current squad.

Pos.	Player	Date of birth (age)	Caps	Goals	Club	Latest call-up
GK	Astrid Gilardi	19 February 2003 (age 23)	0	0	(Italy) Como	v. Denmark, 18 April 2026
DF	Caterina Ambrosi ^{PRE}	1 August 1999 (age 27)	0	0	(Italy) Parma	v. Serbia, 14 April 2026
DF	Marika Massimino ^{PRE}	12 May 2003 (age 23)	0	0	(Italy) Ternana	v. Serbia, 14 April 2026
DF	Julie Piga	12 January 1998 (age 28)	8	0	(Italy) AC Milan	v. United States, 1 December 2025
DF	Beatrice Merlo	23 February 1999 (age 27)	3	0	(Italy) Inter Milan	v. United States, 1 December 2025
MF	Aurora Galli	13 December 1996 (age 29)	75	6	(England) Everton	v. Denmark, 18 April 2026
MF	Nadine Nischler	8 November 2000 (age 26)	1	0	(Italy) Como	v. United States, 1 December 2025
MF	Matilde Pavan	2 March 2006 (age 20)	1	0	(Italy) Como	v. United States, 1 December 2025
MF	Eleonora Goldoni ^{PRE}	16 February 1996 (age 30)	6	0	(Italy) Lazio	v. United States, 28 November 2025
MF	Martina Tomaselli	1 August 2001 (age 25)	2	0	(Italy) Inter Milan	v. Brazil, 28 October 2025
MF	Marta Pandini	21 March 1998 (age 28)	0	0	(Italy) Roma	v. Brazil, 28 October 2025
FW	Agnese Bonfantini	4 July 1999 (age 27)	25	3	(Italy) Fiorentina	v. Denmark, 18 April 2026
FW	Chiara Beccari	27 September 2004 (age 22)	24	2	(Italy) Juventus	v. Denmark, 18 April 2026
FW	Alice Corelli	28 November 2003 (age 22)	1	0	(Italy) Roma	v. United States, 1 December 2025
FW	Elisa Polli	27 August 2000 (age 26)	3	0	(Italy) Inter Milan	v. Brazil, 28 October 2025
Notes: ^{INJ} = Withdrew due to injury; ^{PRE} = Preliminary squad; ^{RET} = Retired from national team; ^{SBY} = Standby; ^{UNV} = Unavailable for selection; ^{WD} = Withdrew due to non-injury issue

== Records ==
As of 9 June 2026

Players in bold are still active with the national team.

=== Most Appearances ===
Rank	Player	Career	Caps	Goals
1	Patrizia Panico	1996–2014	204	110
2	Tatiana Zorri	1994–2010	155	22
3	Carolina Morace	1978–1997	153	105
4	Sara Gama	2006–2024	140	7
5	Alessia Tuttino	2002–2014	133	10
6	**Cristiana Girelli**	2013–present	132	62
7	**Elena Linari**	2013–present	126	6
8	Melania Gabbiadini	2003–2017	121	51
9	**Barbara Bonansea**	2012–present	120	33
9	Antonella Carta	1984–1999	120	31

=== Top goalscorers ===
Rank	Player	Career	Goals	Caps	Avg.
1	Patrizia Panico	1996–2014	110	204	0.54
2	Elisabetta Vignotto	1970–1989	107	109	0.98
3	Carolina Morace	1978–1997	105	153	0.69
4	**Cristiana Girelli**	2013–present	62	132	0.47
5	Melania Gabbiadini	2003–2017	51	121	0.42
6	Rita Guarino	1991–2004	35	99	0.35
7	Daniela Sabatino	2011–2022	33	70	0.47
7	**Barbara Bonansea**	2012–present	33	120	0.28
9	Antonella Carta	1984–1999	31	120	0.26
10	**Valentina Giacinti**	2015–present	27	82	0.33

== Competitive record ==
Competition	1st place, gold medalist(s)	2nd place, silver medalist(s)	3rd place, bronze medalist(s)	Total
FIFA Women's World Cup	0	0	0	0
Olympic Games	0	0	0	0
UEFA Women's Championship	0	2	1	3
Mediterranean Games	0	0	0	0
Universiade	0	0	0	0
Total	0	2	1	3

=== FIFA Women's World Cup ===
FIFA Women's World Cup record									Qualification record					
Year	Round	Position	Pld	W	D*	L	GF	GA	Pld	W	D*	L	GF	GA
(China) 1991	Quarter-finals	6th of 12	4	2	0	2	8	5	UEFA Euro 1991					
(Sweden) 1995	Did not qualify								UEFA Euro 1995					
(United States) 1999	Group stage	9th of 16	3	1	1	1	3	3	6	5	1	0	11	4
(United States) 2003	Did not qualify								6	2	1	3	7	7
(China) 2007	Did not qualify								8	5	0	3	25	6
(Germany) 2011	Did not qualify								16	10	3	3	48	10
(Canada) 2015	Did not qualify								14	9	3	2	54	11
(France) 2019	Quarter-finals	7th of 24	5	3	0	2	9	4	8	7	0	1	19	4
(Australia) (New Zealand) 2023	Group stage	22nd of 32	3	1	0	2	3	8	10	9	0	1	40	2
(Brazil) 2027	To be determined								To be determined					
(Costa Rica) (Jamaica) (Mexico) (United States) 2031	To be determined								To be determined					
(United Kingdom) 2035	To be determined								To be determined					
Total	Best: Quarter-finals	4/9	15	7	1	7	23	20	68	47	8	13	204	44
* Draws include knockout matches decided on penalty kicks.

=== UEFA Women's Championship ===
UEFA Women's Championship record									Qualifying record							
Year	Round	Position	Pld	W	D*	L	GF	GA	Pld	W	D*	L	GF	GA	P/R	Rnk
(Europe) 1984	Semi-finals	4th of 4	2	0	0	2	3	5	6	5	0	1	12	1	–	
(Norway) 1987	Third place	3rd of 4	2	1	0	1	2	3	6	5	1	0	13	6	–	
(West Germany) 1989	Fourth place	4th of 4	2	0	1	1	2	3	8	5	2	1	20	5	–	
(Denmark) 1991	Fourth place	4th of 4	2	0	0	2	1	5	8	3	4	1	13	5	–	
(Italy) 1993	Runners-up	2nd of 4	2	0	1	1	1	2	6	5	1	0	18	6	–	
(Germany) 1995	Did not qualify								8	4	1	3	18	11	–	
(Norway) (Sweden) 1997	Runners-up	2nd of 8	5	2	2	1	7	6	6	4	2	0	16	3	–	
(Germany) 2001	Group stage	5th of 8	3	1	1	1	3	4	8	3	3	2	9	8	–	
(England) 2005	Group stage	8th of 8	3	0	0	3	4	12	10	6	3	1	20	10	–	
(Finland) 2009	Quarter-finals	6th of 12	4	2	0	2	5	5	10	8	0	2	26	8	–	
(Sweden) 2013	Quarter-finals	7th of 12	4	1	1	2	3	5	10	9	1	0	35	0	–	
(Netherlands) 2017	Group stage	12th of 16	3	1	0	2	5	6	8	6	0	2	26	8	–	
(England) 2022	Group stage	13th of 16	3	0	1	2	2	7	10	8	1	1	37	5	–	
(Switzerland) 2025	Semi-finals	3rd of 16	5	2	1	2	6	7	6	2	3	1	8	3	(Note: From Euro 2025 onwards a new qualifying format was introduced, linked to the Women's Nations League where teams are divided into leagues with promotion/relegation between the leagues at the end of each cycle.)	4th
(Germany) 2029																
Total	Best: Runners-up	13/14	40	10	8	22	44	70	110	73	22	15	271	79	4th	

* Draws include knockout matches decided on penalty kicks.

=== UEFA Women's Nations League ===
UEFA Women's Nations League record
League phase												Finals							
Season	LG	Grp	Pos	Pld	W	D	L	GF	GA	P/R	Rnk	Year	Pos	Pld	W	D	L	GF	GA
2023–24	A	4	2nd	6	3	1	2	8	5	Same position	7th	(Europe) 2024	Did not qualify						
2025	A	4	2nd	6	3	1	2	11	7	Same position	7th	(Europe) 2025	Did not qualify						
Total				12	6	2	4	19	12	7th		Total	–	–	–	–	–	–	–

▲	Promoted at end of season
Same position	No movement at end of season
▼	Relegated at end of season
*	Participated in promotion/relegation play-offs

== Honours ==
=== Major competitions ===
- UEFA Women's Championship
  - Runners-up (2): 1993, 1997
  - Third place (1): 1987

== All-time records ==
=== Head-to-head record ===
Key

Positive balance (more wins than losses)
Neutral balance (as many wins as losses)
Negative balance (more losses than wins)

The following table shows Italy's all-time official international record per opponent:

Opponent	Pld	W	D	L	GF	GA	GD	W%	Confederation
Argentina	2	2	0	0	5	0	+5	100.00	CONMEBOL
Armenia	2	2	0	0	15	0	+15	100.00	UEFA
Australia	9	4	2	3	16	14	+2	44.44	AFC
Austria	5	3	1	1	17	2	+15	60.00	UEFA
Belgium	11	6	1	4	22	14	+8	50.00	UEFA
Bosnia and Herzegovina	4	4	0	0	12	0	+12	100.00	UEFA
Brazil	8	0	1	7	7	20	−13	0.00	CONMEBOL
Bulgaria	1	1	0	0	3	1	+2	100.00	UEFA
Canada	10	3	1	6	13	14	−1	33.33	CONCACAF
Chile	3	3	0	0	11	3	+8	100.00	CONMEBOL
China	8	3	2	3	8	8	0	37.50	AFC
Chinese Taipei	1	1	0	0	5	0	+5	100.00	AFC
Colombia	1	1	0	0	2	1	+1	100.00	CONMEBOL
Costa Rica	1	1	0	0	3	0	+3	100.00	CONCACAF
Croatia	4	3	1	0	15	0	+15	75.00	UEFA
Czech Republic	10	10	0	0	32	7	+25	100.00	UEFA
Czechoslovakia	11	6	4	1	19	10	+9	54.54	UEFA
Denmark	27	6	8	13	26	47	−21	22.22	UEFA
England	34	17	7	10	62	43	+19	51.52	UEFA
Estonia	2	2	0	0	9	1	+8	100.00	UEFA
Finland	12	5	6	1	17	12	+5	41.67	UEFA
France	27	14	6	7	41	35	+6	51.85	UEFA
Georgia	4	4	0	0	20	1	+19	100.00	UEFA
Germany	28	5	8	15	22	49	−27	17.86	UEFA
Greece	8	7	1	0	29	2	+27	87.50	UEFA
Hungary	12	10	1	1	25	6	+19	83.33	UEFA
Iceland	8	3	5	0	8	5	+3	37.50	UEFA
Iran	2	2	0	0	7	0	+7	100.00	AFC
Israel	2	2	0	0	15	2	+13	100.00	UEFA
Jamaica	1	1	0	0	5	0	+5	100.00	CONCACAF
Japan	8	7	0	1	34	6	+28	87.50	AFC
Lithuania	1	1	0	0	12	0	+12	100.00	UEFA
North Macedonia	4	4	0	0	44	0	+44	100.00	UEFA
Malta	2	2	0	0	7	0	+7	100.00	UEFA
Mexico	8	4	2	2	23	11	+12	50.00	CONCACAF
Moldova	4	4	0	0	19	1	+18	100.00	UEFA
Morocco	1	0	1	0	0	0	0	0.00	CAF
Netherlands	18	9	5	4	31	17	+14	50.00	UEFA
New Zealand	3	1	0	2	3	3	0	25.00	OFC
Nigeria	1	1	0	0	1	0	+1	100.00	CAF
North Korea	2	0	1	1	3	6	−3	0.00	AFC
Northern Ireland	4	3	0	1	10	2	+8	75.00	UEFA
Norway	17	3	1	13	22	42	−20	17.65	UEFA
Poland	7	6	1	0	22	4	+18	85.71	UEFA
Portugal	16	13	0	3	35	9	+26	81.25	UEFA
Republic of Ireland	7	6	1	0	16	5	+11	85.71	UEFA
Romania	8	8	0	0	25	2	+23	100.00	UEFA
Russia	9	4	0	5	13	10	+3	44.44	UEFA
Scotland	19	14	2	3	51	16	+35	73.68	UEFA
Serbia	1	1	0	0	5	0	+5	100.00	UEFA
Serbia and Montenegro	3	3	0	0	15	1	+14	100.00	UEFA
Slovakia	1	1	0	0	2	1	+1	100.00	UEFA
Slovenia	2	2	0	0	14	0	+14	100.00	UEFA
South Korea	4	4	0	0	7	3	+4	100.00	AFC
South Africa	1	0	0	1	2	3	-1	0.00	CAF
Spain	17	11	4	2	45	14	+31	64.70	UEFA
Soviet Union	1	1	0	0	1	0	+1	100.00	UEFA
Sweden	24	3	5	16	15	47	−32	13.04	UEFA
Switzerland	29	22	2	5	63	24	+39	72.41	UEFA
Thailand	3	3	0	0	11	2	+9	100.00	AFC
Ukraine	8	4	3	1	12	6	+6	50.00	UEFA
United States	16	4	2	10	9	29	−20	25.00	CONCACAF
Wales	3	3	0	0	12	0	+12	100.00	UEFA
Yugoslavia	11	10	0	1	38	4	+34	90.91	UEFA
Total	479	268	79	132	1012	528	+482	55.95	—

Last updated: Italy vs South Africa, 2 August 2023. Statistics include official FIFA-recognised matches only.

=== FIFA rankings ===
Below is a chart of Italy's FIFA ranking from 2003 to the present.

== See also ==
- Italy women's national under-19 football team
- Italy women's national under-17 football team
- Italy men's national football team
- Serie A (women's football)
- Sport in Italy
