= Weronika Szymaszek =

Polish association football player

Personal information
- Date of birth: 17 July 1998 (age 28)
- Place of birth: Kamień Pomorski, Poland
- Position: Defender

Team information
- Current team: Parma

Youth career
- 2013–2015: Olimpia Szczecin

Senior career*
Years	Team	Apps	(Gls)
2015–2018	Olimpia Szczecin		
2019–2020	LFA Szczecin	7	(8)
2020–2022	Olimpia Szczecin	43	(13)
2022–2026	Pogoń Szczecin	67	(16)
2026–	Parma	0	(0)

International career^{‡}
2025–	Poland	2	(0)
- * Club domestic league appearances and goals as of 20:02, 2 June 2026 (UTC) ‡ National team caps and goals as of 19:52, 2 December 2025 (UTC)

Weronika Szymaszek (born 17 July 1998) is a Polish professional footballer who plays as a defender for Serie A Women club Parma and the Poland national team.

== Club career ==
Having previously trained volleyball, she switched her focus to football when she was seventeen. Szymaszek started playing in Ekstraliga in 2015. During her senior career, she played for Olimpia Szczecin, LFA Szczecin and Pogoń Szczecin. In May 2023, she suffered a cruciate ligaments tear, which kept her sidelined for seven months. She resumed training on 8 January 2024, during a preparatory camp for the spring round.

Szymaszek scored a hat-trick on 9 June 2024, in a 6–0 victory over Rekord Bielsko-Biała. During the 2023–24 season, she won the Ekstraliga title with Pogoń.

On 20 July 2026, Szymaszek joined Italian Serie A club Parma on a free transfer.

== International career ==
In 2017, Szymaszek received call-ups to the Poland under-19 national team. She received her first call-up to the Poland senior team in November 2025. She made her Poland debut against Slovenia in a 1–0 friendly win on 28 November, coming on as a substitute in the 46th minute.

== Career statistics ==
=== International ===
As of match played 2 December 2025

Appearances and goals by national team and year
National team	Year	Apps	Goals
Poland
Poland	2025	2	0
Total		2	0

== Honours ==
Pogoń Szczecin

- Ekstraliga: 2023–24

LFA Szczecin

- III liga West Pomerania: 2019–20
