= Chiara Robustellini =

Italian footballer (born 2003)

Personal information
- Date of birth: 30 June 2003 (age 23)
- Place of birth: Luvinate, Italy
- Position: Defender

Team information
- Current team: Inter Milan
- Number: 14

Youth career
- 2019–2023: Inter Milan

Senior career*
Years	Team	Apps	(Gls)
2022–	Inter Milan	60	(6)

International career^{‡}
2022	Italy U19	6	(0)
2022-	Italy U23	13	(0)
- * Club domestic league appearances and goals as of 16 May 2026 ‡ National team caps and goals as of 12 April 2026

Chiara Robustellini (born 30 June 2003) is an Italian professional footballer who plays as a Defender for Serie A club Inter Milan and the Italy women's national U23 team.

== Club career ==
=== Inter Milan ===
Robustellini grew up in the Nerazzurri's youth sector and joined the first team in summer 2022.

On 10 September 2026, Robustellini extended her contract until 30 June 2029.
