= Caterina Ambrosi =

Italian footballer

Personal information
- Date of birth: 1 August 1999 (age 27)
- Place of birth: Negrar di Valpolicella, Italy
- Height: 1.70 m (5 ft 7 in)
- Position: Defender

Team information
- Current team: Parma
- Number: 25

Senior career*
Years	Team	Apps	(Gls)
2015–2018	AGSM Verona	34	(2)
2018–2022	Hellas Verona	68	(1)
2019–2020	→ Cittadella (loan)	6	(0)
2022–2023	Cittadella	29	(5)
2023–	Parma	81	(18)

International career^{‡}
2016	Italy U17	0	(0)
- * Club domestic league appearances and goals as of 17 May 2026 ‡ National team caps and goals as of 15 October 2026

Caterina Ambrosi (born 1999) is an Italian professional footballer who plays as a defender for Serie A club Parma. She is the captain of Parma's women's first team.

== Club career ==
Ambrosi became captain of Parma's women's team and was part of the side that won promotion to Serie A.

According to Gazzetta di Parma, from the 2023–24 season through October 2025, Ambrosi made 69 appearances and scored 17 goals for Parma, while helping the club achieve promotion to Serie A and subsequently establishing herself as a regular in the top division.

In 2026, Ambrosi was named in the Serie A Women Team of the Season for the 2025–26 season at the Athora Game On – All Stars Night.

== International career ==
In October 2025, Ambrosi received her first call-up to the Italy women's national team for friendly matches against Japan and Brazil. She was one of 30 players selected by head coach Andrea Soncin.

== Honours ==
=== Individual ===
- Serie A Team of the Season: 2025–26
