= Attilio Sorbi =

Italian footballer and manager (born 1959)

Personal information
- Full name: Attilio Sorbi
- Date of birth: 7 February 1959 (age 67)
- Place of birth: Cortona, Italy
- Position: Midfielder

Senior career*
Years	Team	Apps	(Gls)
1977–1979	Montevarchi	34	(3)
1979–1980	Ternana	32	(5)
1980–1981	Roma	4	(0)
1981–1984	Pisa	86	(3)
1984–1985	Padova	33	(5)
1985–1987	Bologna	45	(4)
1987–1989	Venezia-Mestre	43	(8)
1989–1991	Cavese	48	(2)
1991–1992	Battipagliese	35	(4)
1992–1994	Rondinella	43	(3)

Managerial career
- 1994–1997: Sangiovannese
- 1997–1999: Olbia
- 1999–2000: Montevarchi
- 2001–2002: AS Sestese
- 2003–2004: Perugia Primavera
- 2004–2006: Olbia
- 2006–2007: Portogruaro
- 2017–2019: Italy (assistant)
- 2019–2021: Inter Women
- * Club domestic league appearances and goals

Attilio Sorbi (born 7 February 1959) is an Italian football manager and former player.

== Playing career ==
Throughout his career he played as a midfielder for Montevarchi, Ternana, Roma, Pisa, Padova, Bologna, Venezia-Mestre, Cavese, Battipagliese and Rondinella.

== Coaching career ==
On 23 July 2019, Sorbi was appointed head coach of Inter Women.
