= Tara Elimbi Gilbert =

French footballer (born 2005)

Personal information
- Full name: Tara Cynthia Hermine Elimbi Gilbert
- Date of birth: 9 June 2005 (age 21)
- Place of birth: Enghien-les-Bains, France
- Height: 1.62 m (5 ft 4 in)
- Position: Left-back

Team information
- Current team: Paris Saint-Germain
- Number: 20

Youth career
- 2013–2020: AF Épinay-sur-Seine
- 2020–2023: Paris Saint-Germain

Senior career*
Years	Team	Apps	(Gls)
2023–	Paris Saint-Germain	60	(4)

International career^{‡}
2022	France U17	7	(1)
2022	France U18	4	(0)
2023–2024	France U19	19	(3)
2024–	France U23	11	(0)
- * Club domestic league appearances and goals as of 21 November 2026 ‡ National team caps and goals as of 12 October 2026

Tara Cynthia Hermine Elimbi Gilbert (born 9 June 2005) is a French professional footballer who plays as a left-back for Première Ligue club Paris Saint-Germain.

== Early life ==
Elimbi Gilbert was born in Enghien-les-Bains, France. She joined the Paris Saint-Germain academy in 2020 and progressed through its youth ranks, gaining recognition as a promising defender.

== Club career ==
Elimbi Gilbert made her senior debut for Paris Saint-Germain on 18 March 2023 in a Coupe de France Féminine semi-final against Thonon Évian. She played her first league match on 27 May 2023 in a 3–0 win against Soyaux.

In the 2023–24 season, Elimbi Gilbert made her debut in the UEFA Women's Champions League, appearing in the quarter-final second leg against BK Häcken. During the 2024–25 season, she became a regular starter for PSG, accumulating 27 appearances across all competitions and scoring two goals.

== International career ==
Elimbi Gilbert has represented France at different youth levels. She was part of France under-17 team which finished third at the 2022 UEFA Women's Under-17 Championship. As a youth international, she also played for France at the 2022 FIFA U-17 Women's World Cup and the 2023 UEFA Women's Under-19 Championship.

== Style of play ==
Elimbi Gilbert is known for her agility, vision, and defensive solidity. A left-footed fullback standing at 1.62 metres, she is effective both in defence and while supporting the attack down the left flank.

== Personal life ==
Born in France, Elimbi Gilbert is of Cameroonian descent and holds dual-citizenship. She is the younger sister of the men's footballer Marvin Elimbi.

== Career statistics ==
As of match played 21 November 2026

Appearances and goals by club, season and competition
Club	Season	League			National cup		League cup		Continental		Other		Total	
Club	Season	Division	Apps	Goals	Apps	Goals	Apps	Goals	Apps	Goals	Apps	Goals	Apps	Goals
Paris Saint-Germain	2022–23	Première Ligue	1	0	1	0	—		0	0	—		2	0
Paris Saint-Germain	2023–24	Première Ligue	10	0	3	0	—		1 (Note: Appearance(s) in UEFA Women's Champions League)	0	1 (Note: Appearance in playoffs)	0	15	0
Paris Saint-Germain	2024–25	Première Ligue	21	1	4	1	—		2	0	0	0	27	2
Paris Saint-Germain	2025–26	Première Ligue	18	2	5	0	3	0	5	0	1	0	32	2
Paris Saint-Germain	2026–27	Première Ligue	10	1	0	0	0	0	7	1	—		17	2
Career total			60	4	13	1	3	0	15	1	2	0	93	6

== Honours ==
Paris Saint-Germain

- Coupe de France Féminine: 2023–24

France U17

- UEFA Women's Under-17 Championship third place: 2022

Individual

- UNFP Première Ligue young player of the year: 2024–25
- LFFP Première Ligue best young player: 2024–25
- LFFP Première Ligue team of the season: 2024–25
