= Suzanne Bakker =

Dutch footballer and coach (born 1986)

Personal information
- Date of birth: 9 July 1986 (age 40)
- Place of birth: Hensbroek, the Netherlands
- Height: 1.86 m (6 ft 1 in)
- Position: Midfielder

Team information
- Current team: AC Milan Women (manager)

Youth career
- Apollo '68
- –2007: VV Reiger Boys

Senior career*
| Years | Team | Apps | (Gls) |
| 2007–2008 | FC Utrecht | 17 | (1) |
| 2008–2014 | ASV Wartburgia | | |

International career^{‡}
| 2004–2005 | Netherlands | 5 | (0) |

Managerial career
- 2014–2017: ASV Wartburgia
- 2017–2018: Excelsior Rotterdam (assistant)
- 2018–2022: Jong AFC Ajax
- 2022–2024: AFC Ajax
- 2024–: AC Milan
- * Club domestic league appearances and goals as of 1 December 2024 ‡ National team caps and goals as of 1 December 2024

Suzanne Bakker (born 9 July 1986) is a Dutch football manager and former footballer who manages AC Milan Women. She played briefly for the Netherlands women's national team. She coached Ajax for two seasons, winning the 2022–23 Eredivisie title and 2023–24 KNVB Women's Cup.

== Career ==
Bakker started her managerial career with Dutch side ASV Wartburgia. In 2017, she was appointed as an assistant manager of Dutch side Excelsior Rotterdam, before being appointed as manager of the reserve team of Dutch side AFC Ajax in 2022. Two years later, she was promoted to manager of the club's first team, helping them win the Eredivisie and 2023–24 KNVB Women's Cup. Despite this, she left them at the end of the 2023–24 season. Ahead of the 2024–25 season, she was appointed manager of Italian side AC Milan. While managing the club, she was regarded to have preferred the 4–3–3 formation.

== Controversy ==
Nadia Nadim, a Danish player from Afghanistan, who played football in a refugee camp, said that "training in the refugee camp was better" than training under Bakker in Milan in 2024.
