= Marvin Elimbi =

French footballer (born 2003)

Personal information
- Full name: Marvin Adolphe Fabrice Elimbi Gilbert
- Date of birth: 20 February 2003 (age 23)
- Place of birth: Strasbourg, France
- Height: 1.86 m (6 ft 1 in)
- Position: Centre-back

Team information
- Current team: Gil Vicente
- Number: 4

Youth career
- 2012–2016: Epinay-sur-Seine
- 2016–2018: Reims
- 2018–2021: Strasbourg

Senior career*
Years	Team	Apps	(Gls)
2021–2023	Strasbourg II	14	(0)
2022–2023	→ Orléans II (loan)	2	(0)
2022–2023	→ Orléans (loan)	23	(0)
2023–2024	Torreense	30	(1)
2024–	Gil Vicente	39	(0)
- * Club domestic league appearances and goals as of 25 May 2026

Marvin Adolphe Fabrice Elimbi Gilbert (born 20 February 2003) is a French professional football player who plays as a centre-back for Primeira Liga club Gil Vicente.

== Career ==
Elimbi is a youth product of Reims and Strasbourg. On 31 May 2021, he signed his first professional contract with Strasbourg and was promoted to their reserves. On 23 June 2022, he joined Orléans on loan in Ligue 2. On 1 July 2023, he transferred to the Liga Portugal 2 club Torreense. On 29 August 2024, he transferred to the Primeira Liga club Gil Vicente on a contract until 2028.

== Personal life ==
Born in France, Elimbi is of Cameroonian descent and holds dual-citizenship. He is the older brother of the women's footballer Tara Elimbi Gilbert.
