= Gianni Corelli =

Italian footballer and manager (1936–2008)

Personal information
- Date of birth: 30 December 1936
- Place of birth: Ferrara, Italy
- Date of death: 11 May 2008 (aged 71)
- Height: 1.83 m (6 ft 0 in)
- Position: Forward

Senior career*
Years	Team	Apps	(Gls)
1956–1957	S.P.A.L.		
1957–1959	Spezia		
1959–1961	S.P.A.L.		
1961–1965	Napoli		
1965–1968	Mantova		
1968–1969	Ternana		
1969–1970	Foligno		

Managerial career
- 1971–1973: Spezia
- 1973–1974: Mantova
- 1975–1977: Crotone
- 1977–1978: Parma
- 1978–1979: Crotone
- 1979–1981: Real Giulianova
- 1981–1984: Barletta
- 1987–1988: Sorso
- 1988–1990: Jesina
- 1990–1991: Suzzara
- * Club domestic league appearances and goals

Gianni Corelli (30 December 1936 – 11 May 2008) was an Italian professional footballer and manager.
