= Parma Calcio 1913 (women) =

Association football club in Italy

Parma Calcio
- Full name: Parma Calcio 1913 S.r.l.
- Nickname: "I Gialloblu"
- Short name: Parma
- Founded: July 2015; 11 years ago (as Academy Parma Calcio); 10 June 2022; 4 years ago (as Parma Calcio 2022)
- Ground: Stadio Il Noce
- Capacity: 800
- Owner(s): Krause Group (99%); Parma Partecipazioni Calcistiche SrL (1% owned by fans)
- President: Kyle J. Krause
- Head coach: Stefano Sottili
- League: Serie A
- 2025-26: Serie A, 11th of 12
- Website: http://parmacalcio1913.com/
Home colours	Away colours	Third colours

Parma Calcio 1913 (Italian pronunciation: [ˈparma]), commonly known as Parma Women, is an Italian professional women's football club based in Parma, Emilia-Romagna, which competes in the Serie A, the top tier of the Italian women's football league system. It is the women's section of the eponymous professional football club.

== History ==
It was originally founded in July 2015 as part of the male parent club's reformation from bankruptcy and played in the lower regional divisions. In June 2022, Parma's owners bought out Empoli Ladies, obtaining a place in the full-time professional Serie A and reconstituting themselves as Parma Calcio 2022.

In the 2022–23 Serie A season, the club finished 10th and was relegated to Serie B.

To align with the men's team, the women's team officially changed its name to Parma Calcio 1913 in 2023. The team finished second in Serie B during the 2024–25 season, securing direct promotion back to Serie A.

== Stadium ==
In August 2022 Parma announced that all the women's team's home matches will be staged at the Stadio Ennio Tardini.

== Players ==
=== Current squad ===
As of 25 October 2026

Note: Flags indicate national team as defined under FIFA eligibility rules; some limited exceptions apply. Players may hold more than one non-FIFA nationality.

No.	Pos.	Nation	Player
2	DF	POR	Iara Lobo (on loan from Barcelona C)
5	DF	USA	Hannah Sharts
6	MF	NOR	Julie Jorde
7	MF	FRA	Iris Rabot
8	MF	ITA	Giada Pondini
10	FW	GER	Gina Chmielinski
11	FW	IRL	Erin Healy
12	GK	ROU	Camelia Ceasar
13	DF	ITA	Beatrice Merlo
16	DF	ITA	Sara Zappettini
17	FW	ITA	Gaia Distefano
18	DF	ESP	Laura Domínguez
20	DF	POL	Weronika Szymaszek
21	FW	ITA	Cecilia Cavallin (on loan from Juventus)
22	GK	ITA	Matilde Copetti

No.	Pos.	Nation	Player
23	MF	ITA	Martina Tomaselli
25	DF	ITA	Caterina Ambrosi
26	FW	BIH	Emina Ekić
27	MF	FRA	Mariah Gueguen
28	FW	ISL	Birta Georgsdóttir
29	MF	FRA	Manon Uffren
31	MF	USA	Natalie Muth
37	MF	ITA	Cecilia Prugna
42	FW	SCO	Tegan Bowie
77	FW	DEN	Signe Christensen
90	FW	ITA	Vittoria Musumeci
—	DF	ESP	Berta Bou
—	GK	ITA	Fabiana Fierro

== See also ==
- List of women's association football clubs
- List of women's football clubs in Italy
