= Manon Uffren =

French footballer (born 1997)

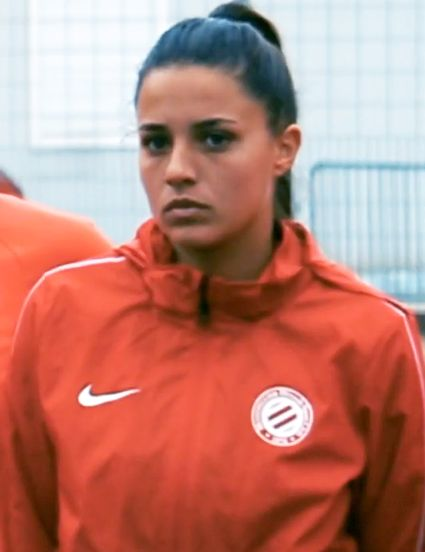
- Uffren with Montpellier in 2019

Personal information
- Date of birth: 2 June 1997 (age 29)
- Place of birth: Avignon, France
- Height: 1.69 m (5 ft 7 in)
- Position: Midfielder

Team information
- Current team: Parma
- Number: 29

Youth career
- 2003–2007: US Eygalières
- 2007–2012: AS Saint-Rémoise
- 2012–2014: FCF Monteux
- 2014–2016: Montpellier

Senior career*
Years	Team	Apps	(Gls)
2013–2014	FCF Monteux	21	(5)
2014–2020	Montpellier	21	(1)
2017	→ Dijon (loan)	10	(3)
2019–2020	→ Saint-Étienne (loan)	4	(0)
2020–2022	Saint-Étienne	22	(2)
2024–2025	Nantes	31	(1)
2025–	Parma	20	(2)

International career
2013	France U16	3	(1)
2013	France U17	8	(1)
2015	France U19	7	(2)
- * Club domestic league appearances and goals as of 10 May 2026

Manon Uffren (born 2 June 1997) is a French professional footballer who plays as a midfielder for Serie A Femminile club Parma.

== International career ==
Uffren has represented France at various youth levels.

== Honours ==
Individual

- LFFP Première Ligue goal of the season: 2024–25
- Première Ligue Player of the Month: October 2024
