= Nadine Sorelli =

Italian footballer (born 2005)

Personal information
- Date of birth: 2 February 2005 (age 21)
- Place of birth: Vimercate, Italy
- Position: Centre back

Team information
- Current team: AC Milan
- Number: 6

Youth career
- –2020: Atalanta
- 2020–2024: AC Milan

Senior career*
Years	Team	Apps	(Gls)
2024–	AC Milan	25	(0)

International career^{‡}
2021–2022	Italy U17	10	(1)
2022–2024	Italy U19	13	(0)
2024–2025	Italy U23	7	(0)
- * Club domestic league appearances and goals as of 17 May 2026 ‡ National team caps and goals as of 8 October 2026

Nadine Sorelli (born 2 February 2005) is an Italian professional footballer who plays as a centre back for Serie A club AC Milan.

== Club career ==
Sorelli began her youth development at Atalanta BC before moving to the AC Milan Youth Sector in 2020 at the age of 15.

She officially joined the Women's First Team for the 2024/25 season, inheriting the No. 6 shirt from Laura Fusetti and making her debut against Fiorentina in September. In her first senior season, she made 24 appearances across all competitions. in 2025/26 she was held back by a long-term injury, returning toward the end of the season.
