= AC Milan Women =

Italian football club

AC Milan
- Full name: Associazione Calcio Milan S.p.A.
- Nicknames: Rossonere (Note: A feminine plural of Rossoneri.) (Red and Black)
- Short name: A.C Milan Women, Milan Femminile
- Founded: 11 June 2018; 8 years ago
- Ground: Centro Sportivo Vismara
- Owner(s): RedBird Capital Partners (99.93%); Private shareholders (0.07%)
- Chairman: Paolo Scaroni
- Manager: Suzanne Bakker
- League: Serie A
- 2025–26: Serie A, 6th of 12
- Website: www.acmilan.com
| Home colours | Away colours | Third colours |

Associazione Calcio Milan, colloquially known as Milan Women or simply Milan, is an Italian professional women's football club in Milan. The club was established in 2018 by acquiring the Serie A licence of a Capriolo, Brescia-based team SSD Brescia Calcio Femminile. The team competes in Serie A and are based in the Centro Sportivo Vismara.

== History ==
Although there have been previous women's team located in Milan that used the name and colors as the men's AC Milan club, AC Milan Women is the first to have any connection to the men's club which established membership in Serie A Women's championship. Previous teams that used the name and colors of AC Milan include the Associazione Calcio Femminile Milan started in 1965, the Associazione Calcio Femminile Milan 82 founded in 1982, and the more recent Football Milan Ladies begun in 2013. On 11 June 2018 AC Milan announced that participation in the Serie A Women's championship after acquiring the rights to A.C.F Brescia.

The 12-time Serie A leading goalscorer and first woman to be inducted into the Italian Football Hall of Fame Carolina Morace was named as the inaugural head coach. Milan's first season saw the team finish in 3rd place, missing out on qualification to the UEFA Champions League by 1 point. Valentina Giacinti won the league Golden Boot with 21 goals, while her Milan teammate Daniela Sabatino finished in 2nd with 17 goals.

On 25 June 2019 Maurizio Ganz was appointed as the new first team coach, signing a 2-year contract. The following two seasons, 2020–21 and 2021–22, proved very positive for the club, despite the lack of trophies, having reached the second place in the 2020–21 Serie A, and with defeats in both the 2020–21 Coppa Italia final (on penalties, against Roma) and the 2021 Italian Supercup final (against Juventus).

== Player welfare ==
On 2 August 2024, it was announced on the club's official website that players who are pregnant in the final year of their contract will receive an automatic one-year contract extension. The club will also provide childcare assistance during sports activities and cover flights, accommodations, as well as other travel expenses for the player's child and one companion. This move by the club is one of the first such policy introduced by an elite European football club.

== Current squad ==
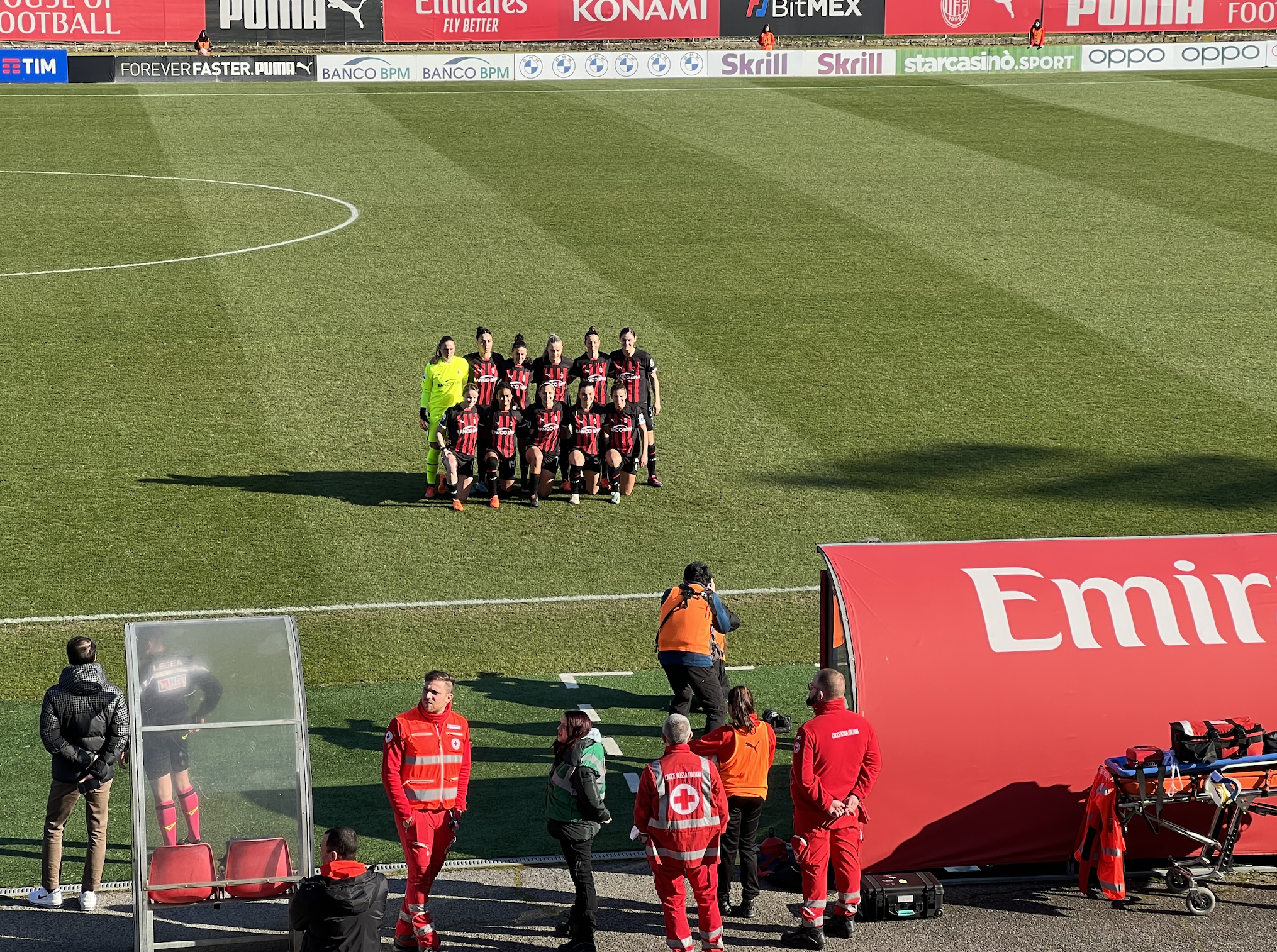
The starting XI before a game at Centro Sportivo Vismara in February 2023.

=== First-team squad ===
As of 6 October 2026

Note: Flags indicate national team as defined under FIFA eligibility rules; some limited exceptions apply. Players may hold more than one non-FIFA nationality.

| No. | Pos. | Nation | Player |
|---|---|---|---|
| 1 | GK | ESP | Sandra Estevez |
| 2 | DF | FIN | Emma Koivisto |
| 6 | DF | ITA | Nadine Sorelli |
| 7 | FW | NOR | Thea Kyvåg |
| 8 | MF | ITA | Giorgia Arrigoni |
| 9 | FW | NOR | Sara Kanutte |
| 11 | MF | SCO | Christy Grimshaw (Captain) |
| 12 | MF | ITA | Marta Mascarello |
| 14 | FW | KOR | Park Soo-jeong |
| 15 | MF | SRB | Sara Stokić |
| 17 | FW | NOR | Mawa Sesay |
| 18 | FW | ITA | Monica Renzotti |
| 19 | FW | ECU | Doménica Arboleda |

| No. | Pos. | Nation | Player |
|---|---|---|---|
| 20 | DF | ITA | Angelica Soffia |
| 21 | DF | NED | Milicia Keijzer |
| 22 | GK | ITA | Lavinia Tornaghi |
| 23 | DF | ITA | Julie Piga |
| 24 | GK | USA | Sally Rainey |
| 25 | DF | SUR | Kay-Lee de Sanders |
| 26 | DF | ITA | Leda Gemmi |
| 32 | MF | USA | Abi Brighton (on loan from Juventus) |
| 33 | DF | ITA | Elisa Bonanomi |
| 35 | FW | ITA | Paola Taddei |
| 38 | MF | ITA | Elena Vitale |
| 47 | DF | ESP | Nerea Nevado |
| 80 | FW | POL | Ewelina Kamczyk |

=== Out on loan ===
Note: Flags indicate national team as defined under FIFA eligibility rules; some limited exceptions apply. Players may hold more than one non-FIFA nationality.

| No. | Pos. | Nation | Player |
|---|---|---|---|
| 27 | MF | ITA | Erin Cesarini (at Fleury until 30 June 2027) |
| 29 | FW | ITA | Karen Appiah Amoakoah (at Cesena until 30 June 2027) |
| — | MF | ITA | Anna Longobardi (at Lazio until 30 June 2027) |

== Managerial history ==
Below is a list of AC Milan coaches since 2018.

| Name | Nationality | Years |
|---|---|---|
| Carolina Morace | Italy | 2018–2019 |
| Maurizio Ganz | Italy | 2019–2023 |
| Davide Corti | Italy | 2023–2024 |
| Suzanne Bakker | Netherlands | 2024– |

== Honours ==
- Serie A
  - Runners-up (1): 2020–21
- Coppa Italia
  - Runners-up (1): 2020–21
- Supercoppa Italiana
  - Runners-up (1): 2021

== See also ==
- Category:AC Milan Women players
- List of women's association football clubs
- List of women's football clubs in Italy
