= Ettore Recagni =

Italian association football manager (1937–2020)

Personal information
- Date of birth: 6 November 1937
- Place of birth: Lodi, Italy
- Position: Striker

Senior career*
Years	Team	Apps	(Gls)
1957-1959	Mantova 1911	64	(28)
1959-1960	Lazio	2	(0)
1960-1964	Mantova 1911	107	(19)
1964-1966	Reggiana	53	(16)

Managerial career
- 1984-1989: Italy (women)
- 1999-2000: Italy (women)
- * Club domestic league appearances and goals

Ettore Recagni (6 November 1937 – 2 November 2020) was an Italian football manager and player.
