= Inter Milan (women) =

Italian women's football club

Inter Women
- Full name: Football Club Internazionale Milano S.p.A.
- Nicknames: Le Nerazzurre (The Black and Blues); La Beneamata (The Cherished One); Il Biscione (The Big Grass Snake)
- Short name: Inter Women, Inter Femminile
- Founded: 23 October 2018; 8 years ago
- Ground: Arena Civica
- Capacity: 10,000
- Owners: Oaktree Capital Management (99.6%); Other shareholders (0.04%)
- Chairman: Giuseppe Marotta
- Manager: David Sassarini
- League: Serie A
- 2025–26: Serie A, 2nd of 12
- Website: www.inter.it
Home colours	Away colours

Football Club Internazionale Milano S.p.A., also known as Inter or with the commercial name of Inter Women, is an Italian women's football club based in Milan.

== History ==
Before the 2018–19 season, Inter only had women's youth teams. On 23 October 2018, the club acquired the sporting rights from A.S.D. Femminile Inter Milano, creating its first senior women's team in over a century.

In Inter's first season in 2018–19 Serie B, Inter earned promotion to Serie A finishing with 64 points from 21 wins and just one draw.

In November 2023, the team moved to the historic Arena Civica, previously home of the men's team from 1930 to 1947.

On 19 April 2025, Inter qualified for the UEFA Champions League for the 2025-2026 season for the first time, defeating Roma 3–0 at the Arena Civica with goals from Elisa Polli and Elisa Bartoli.

On September 2, 2026, Inter faced the VfL Wolfsburg women's team in the UEFA Women's Champions League qualifying round. They won the return leg at the Ernesto Breda Stadium 3–1 in regulation time with goals from Elisa Bartoli, Elisa Polli, and Marija Ana Milinković, and triumphed 5–4 on penalties, with Spaniard Ivana Andrés scoring the decisive spot-kick to secure a place in the 2025/2026 league phase.

In a historic moment on September 22, the Inter Milan Women team made their Champions League debut by defeating BK Häcken 1–0 at the Brianteo Stadium in Monza; Maltese player Haley Bugeja scored the goal, marking the team's first-ever goal in the 2026/2027 league phase.

== Players ==
=== First-team squad ===
As of 1 October 2026

Note: Flags indicate national team as defined under FIFA eligibility rules; some limited exceptions apply. Players may hold more than one non-FIFA nationality.

No.	Pos.	Nation	Player
1	GK	ISL	Cecilía Rán Rúnarsdóttir
2	DF	SWE	Emma Kullberg
4	DF	DOM	Samantha van Diemen
5	DF	ESP	Ivana Andrés
6	MF	ITA	Irene Santi
7	FW	MLT	Haley Bugeja
8	MF	ISL	Karólína Lea Vilhjálmsdóttir
9	FW	ITA	Elisa Polli
10	MF	GER	Lina Magull
11	FW	FRA	Clarisse Le Bihan
12	GK	ITA	Camilla Forcinella
14	DF	ITA	Chiara Robustellini

No.	Pos.	Nation	Player
15	DF	ESP	Sheila García
16	MF	MNE	Maša Tomašević
17	FW	NGR	Toni Payne
18	FW	ITA	Benedetta Glionna
20	MF	BEL	Marie Detruyer
22	MF	SWE	Olivia Schough
24	DF	BIH	Marija Milinković
26	FW	HAI	Brittany Raphino
29	MF	ITA	Rachele Giudici
33	DF	ITA	Elisa Bartoli
36	FW	ITA	Michela Cambiaghi
99	GK	ITA	Elena Belli

=== Out on loan ===
As of 26 September 2026

Note: Flags indicate national team as defined under FIFA eligibility rules; some limited exceptions apply. Players may hold more than one non-FIFA nationality.

No.	Pos.	Nation	Player
—	MF	ITA	Martina Tomaselli (at Parma Calcio Women until 30 June 2027)
—	DF	ITA	Caterina Fracaros (at Bologna Women until 30 June 2027)
—	DF	ITA	Angela Passeri (at Genoa CFC Women until 30 June 2027)
—	FW	ARG	Annika Paz (at Sassuolo Women until 30 June 2027)
—	DEF	ITA	Sofia Verrini (at Cesena Femminile until 30 june 2027)
—	FW	ITA	Gaia Lonati (at Parma Calcio Women until 30 June 2027)
—	DF	DEN	Caroline Pleidrup (at Napoli Women until 30 June 2027)
—	MF	ITA	Benedetta Santoro (at Hellas Verona Women until 30 June 2027)
—	DF	HUN	Beatrix Fördős (at Lazio Women until 30 June 2027)

== Managerial history ==
Below is a list of Inter Women coaches from 2018 until the present day.

Name	Nationality	Years
Sebastián de la Fuente	Argentina	2018–2019
Attilio Sorbi	Italy	2019–2021
Rita Guarino	Italy	2021–2024
Gianpiero Piovani	Italy	2024–2026
David Sassarini	Italy	2026–

== Honours ==
- Serie B
  - Winners (1): 2018–19

== See also ==
- Category:Inter Milan (women) players
- List of women's association football clubs
- List of women's football clubs in Italy
