= 2022 UEFA Women's Under-17 Championship qualification =

Tournament details
- Dates: Round 1: 23 September – 14 November 2021; Round 2: 8 March – 13 April 2022
- Teams: 49 (from 1 confederation)

Tournament statistics
- Matches played: 124
- Goals scored: 546 (4.4 per match)
- Top scorer(s): (Austria) Valentina Mädl (Netherlands) Hanna Huizenga (9 goals each)

The 2022 UEFA Women's Under-17 Championship qualifying competition was a women's under-17 football competition that determined the seven teams joining the automatically qualified hosts Bosnia and Herzegovina in the 2022 UEFA Women's Under-17 Championship final tournament.

49 teams, including hosts Bosnia and Herzegovina, entered the qualifying competition. Players born on or after 1 January 2005 were eligible to participate.

== Format ==
From this season, UEFA implemented a new format for the women's U17 and U19 Euros, based on a league-style qualifying format.

The teams are divided in two leagues: League A and League B. In this first season of the new system, the teams were divided using coefficient rankings.

Each league will play two rounds:

- Round 1: In each league, groups of 4 teams will play mini-tournaments. The winners of each mini-tournament in league B and the best runner-up will be promoted and the last-placed teams in league A mini-tournaments will be relegated.
- Round 2: The seven winners of League A will qualify for the final tournament. The six winners of mini-tournaments in league B and the best runner-up will be promoted and the last-placed teams in league A will be relegated for Round 1 of the next edition of the tournament.

=== Tiebreakers ===
In Round 1 and Round 2, teams are ranked according to points (3 points for a win, 1 point for a draw, 0 points for a loss), and if tied on points, the following tiebreaking criteria are applied, in the order given, to determine the rankings (Regulations Articles 17.01 and 17.02):

1. Points in head-to-head matches among tied teams;
2. Goal difference in head-to-head matches among tied teams;
3. Goals scored in head-to-head matches among tied teams;
4. If more than two teams are tied, and after applying all head-to-head criteria above, a subset of teams are still tied, all head-to-head criteria above are reapplied exclusively to this subset of teams;
5. Goal difference in all group matches;
6. Goals scored in all group matches;
7. Penalty shoot-out if only two teams have the same number of points, and they met in the last round of the group and are tied after applying all criteria above (not used if more than two teams have the same number of points, or if their rankings are not relevant for qualification for the next stage);
8. Disciplinary points (red card = 3 points, yellow card = 1 point, expulsion for two yellow cards in one match = 3 points);
9. Position in the applicable ranking:
  1. for teams in round 1, position in the coefficient rankings;
  2. for teams in round 2, position in the round 1 league ranking.

To determine the five best third-placed teams from the qualifying round, the results against the teams in fourth place are discarded. The following criteria are applied (Regulations Article 15.01):

1. Points;
2. Goal difference;
3. Goals scored;
4. Disciplinary points;
5. Position in the applicable ranking:
  1. for teams in round 1, position in the coefficient rankings;
  2. for teams in round 2, position in the round 1 league ranking.

== Round 1 ==
=== Draw ===
The draw for the qualifying round was held on 11 March 2021, 13:30 CET (UTC+1), at the UEFA headquarters in Nyon, Switzerland.

The teams were seeded according to their coefficient ranking, calculated based on the following :

- 2015 UEFA Women's Under-17 Championship final tournament and qualifying competition (qualifying round and elite round)
- 2016 UEFA Women's Under-17 Championship final tournament and qualifying competition (qualifying round and elite round)
- 2017 UEFA Women's Under-17 Championship final tournament and qualifying competition (qualifying round and elite round)
- 2018 UEFA Women's Under-17 Championship final tournament and qualifying competition (qualifying round and elite round)

Each group contained one team from Pot A, one team from Pot B, one team from Pot C, and one team from Pot D. For political reasons, Armenia and Azerbaijan would not be drawn in the same group.

The 28 first teams in the coefficient ranking qualified for League A. Teams 29–49 qualified for League B.

Teams entering League A

Pot 1
Team	Coeff	Rank
Germany TH	33.167	1
Spain	30.056	2
England	23.444	3
Netherlands	22.056	4
Norway	19.278	5
Denmark	15.389	6
Italy	15.056	7

Pot 2
Team	Coeff	Rank
France	14.278	8
Poland	13.722	9
Republic of Ireland	13.722	10
Austria	13.611	11
Finland	13.500	12
Czech Republic	12.389	13
Serbia	12.333	14

Pot 3
Team	Coeff	Rank
Portugal	12.333	15
Belgium	11.667	16
Iceland	11.000	17
Sweden	11.000	18
Hungary	10.500	19
Switzerland	10.000	20
Slovenia	9.667	21

Pot 4
Team	Coeff	Rank
Russia	8.667	22
Scotland	8.167	23
Greece	8.167	24
Bulgaria	6.000	25
Wales	5.833	26
Bosnia and Herzegovina	5.833	27
Northern Ireland	5.500	28

Teams entering League B

Pot 5
Team	Coeff	Rank
Ukraine	5.500	29
Belarus	5.000	30
Turkey	4.833	31
Slovakia	4.333	32
Azerbaijan	3.500	33
Lithuania	3.333	34

Pot 6
Team	Coeff	Rank
Romania	3.167	35
Croatia	2.333	36
Georgia	1.667	37
Israel	1.667	38
Estonia	1.333	39
Montenegro	1.333	40

Pot 7
Team	Coeff	Rank
Faroe Islands	1.000	41
Latvia	1.000	42
Moldova	0.333	43
Kazakhstan	0.333	44
North Macedonia	0.333	45
Albania	0.000	46
Armenia	0.000	47
Kosovo	NC	48
Luxembourg	NC	49

=== League A ===
Times are CEST (UTC+2), as listed by UEFA (local times, if different, are in parentheses).

==== Group A1 ====
Pos	Team	Pld	W	D	L	GF	GA	GD	Pts	Promotion
1	Republic of Ireland	3	3	0	0	8	2	+6	9	Transfer to Round 2 (League A)
2	Norway (H)	3	2	0	1	10	3	+7	6	Transfer to Round 2 (League A)
3	Hungary	3	1	0	2	3	7	−4	3	Transfer to Round 2 (League A)
4	Bulgaria	3	0	0	3	0	9	−9	0	Relegated to Round 2 (League B)

Source: UEFA
Rules for classification: Qualification tiebreakers
(H) Hosts
9 October 2021
14:00

Hungary	1–3	Republic of Ireland
Molnár 90'	Report	Larkin 3', 70'; Loughrey 23'

Sandnes Stadion, Sandnes
Referee: Alina Peșu (Romania)
9 October 2021
17:30

Norway	5–0	Bulgaria
Folland 14', 29'; Lervik 37'; Rasmussen 45', 75'	Report

Sandnes Stadion, Sandnes
Referee: Zoe Stavrou (Cyprus)

12 October 2021
14:00

Republic of Ireland	3–0	Bulgaria
O'Mahony 26'; Long 38'; Larkin 45+2' (pen.)	Report

Sandnes Stadion, Sandnes
Referee: Alina Peșu (Romania)
12 October 2021
17:00

Norway	4–1	Hungary
Gaupset 17' (pen.), 67'; Lervik 34'; Sesay 39'	Report	Molnár 54'

Viking Stadion, Stavanger
Referee: Lizzy van der Helm (Netherlands)

15 October 2021
17:00

Republic of Ireland	2–1	Norway
O'Leary 45'; Ralph 90+1'	Report	Rasmussen 83'

Sandnes Stadion, Sandnes
Referee: Lizzy van der Helm (Netherlands)
15 October 2021
17:00

Bulgaria	0–1	Hungary
	Report	Mayer 32'

Viking Stadion, Stavanger
Referee: Zoe Stavrou (Cyprus)

==== Group A2 ====
Pos	Team	Pld	W	D	L	GF	GA	GD	Pts	Promotion
1	Netherlands (H)	2	1	1	0	4	1	+3	4	Transfer to Round 2 (League A)
2	Czech Republic	2	0	2	0	2	2	0	2	Transfer to Round 2 (League A)
3	Slovenia	2	0	1	1	1	4	−3	1	Transfer to Round 2 (League A)
4	Scotland	0	0	0	0	0	0	0	0	Withdrew, relegated to Round 2 (League B) (Note: On 28 September 2021, the Scottish FA withdrew from the Round 1 of the UEFA Women’s Under-17s Championships due to a number of positive COVID-19 tests in the squad)

Source: UEFA
Rules for classification: Qualification tiebreakers
(H) Hosts
Notes:
29 September 2021
16:00

Slovenia	1–1	Czech Republic
Vilčnik 56' (pen.)	Report	Kostohryzová 67'

De Wieën, Venray
Referee: Frederikke Lydia Søkjær (Denmark)
29 September 2021
19:00

Netherlands	Cancelled	Scotland
	Report

Sportpark Parkzicht, Uden

2 October 2021
13:00

Czech Republic	Cancelled	Scotland
	Report

Sportpark Parkzicht, Uden
2 October 2021
16:00

Netherlands	3–0	Slovenia
Huizenga 24', 32'; Tolhoek 75'	Report

De Wieën, Venray
Referee: Lovisa Johansson (Sweden)

5 October 2021
19:00

Czech Republic	1–1	Netherlands
Vithová 49' (pen.)	Report	Huizenga 25' (pen.)

Sportpark Parkzicht, Uden
Referee: Marina Živković (Serbia)
5 October 2021
19:00

Scotland	Cancelled	Slovenia
	Report

De Wieën, Venray

==== Group A3 ====
Pos	Team	Pld	W	D	L	GF	GA	GD	Pts	Promotion
1	Sweden (H)	3	2	1	0	10	2	+8	7	Transfer to Round 2 (League A)
2	France	3	2	1	0	9	2	+7	7	Transfer to Round 2 (League A)
3	Italy	3	1	0	2	2	8	−6	3	Transfer to Round 2 (League A)
4	Wales	3	0	0	3	0	9	−9	0	Relegated to Round 2 (League B)

Source: UEFA
Rules for classification: Qualification tiebreakers
(H) Hosts
22 October 2021
18:00

Sweden	2–2	France
Skoog 26'; Wessman 40'	Report	Chossenotte 6'; Swierot 50' (pen.)

Borås Arena, Borås
Referee: Ana Maria Alexandra Terteleac (Romania)
22 October 2021
18:00

Italy	2–0	Wales
Dragoni 37'; Moretti 90+3'	Report

Bravida Arena, Gothenburg
Referee: Franziska Wildfeuer (Germany)

25 October 2021
18:00

France	4–0	Wales
Marques 9' (pen.); Gstalter 31'; Swierot 90+5'; Belhout Achi 90+6'	Report

Bravida Arena, Gothenburg
Referee: Ana Maria Alexandra Terteleac (Romania)
25 October 2021
18:00

Italy	0–5	Sweden
	Report	Alvin 27'; Wessman 60', 69', 86', 90+2'

Borås Arena, Borås
Referee: Ainara Acevedo (Spain)

28 October 2021
18:00

Wales	0–3	Sweden
	Report	Winblad 3'; Skoog 59'; Svanström 71'

Borås Arena, Borås
Referee: Franziska Wildfeuer (Germany)
28 October 2021
18:00

France	3–0	Italy
Chossenotte 48'; Belhout Achi 65'; Boisset 85'	Report

Bravida Arena, Gothenburg
Referee: Ainara Acevedo (Spain)

==== Group A4 ====
Pos	Team	Pld	W	D	L	GF	GA	GD	Pts	Promotion
1	Germany	3	3	0	0	12	1	+11	9	Transfer to Round 2 (League A)
2	Portugal (H)	3	2	0	1	9	3	+6	6	Transfer to Round 2 (League A)
3	Finland	3	1	0	2	4	11	−7	3	Transfer to Round 2 (League A)
4	Bosnia and Herzegovina	3	0	0	3	0	10	−10	0	Relegated to Round 2 (League B)

Source: UEFA
Rules for classification: Qualification tiebreakers
(H) Hosts
8 November 2021
17:00 (16:00 WEST)

Portugal	6–0	Finland
Simas 22'; Correia 36'; M. Ferreira 67'; L. Martins 80'; C. Martins 86'; A. Ferreira 90+3'	Report

Albufeira Municipal Stadium, Albufeira
Referee: Abigail Marriott (England)
8 November 2021
17:00 (16:00 WEST)

Germany	4–0	Bosnia and Herzegovina
Böhler 3'; Steiner 13'; Şehitler 24', 36'	Report

Estádio Algarve, Faro/Loulé
Referee: Maika Vanderstichel (France)

11 November 2021
16:00 (15:00 WEST)

Germany	3–1	Portugal
Bender 26', 53'; Platner 83'	Report	Simas 58' (pen.)

Albufeira Municipal Stadium, Albufeira
Referee: Maria Sole Caputi (Italy)
11 November 2021
16:00 (15:00 WEST)

Finland	4–0	Bosnia and Herzegovina
Schalin 10'; Seiro 29'; Angeria 43' (pen.); Halttunen 46'	Report

Estádio Algarve, Faro/Loulé
Referee: Abigail Marriott (England)

14 November 2021
18:00 (17:00 WEST)

Finland	0–5	Germany
	Report	Şehitler 34'; Alber 39'; Platner 42'; Steiner 50'; Werner 90+5'

Albufeira Municipal Stadium, Albufeira
Referee: Maria Sole Caputi (Italy)
14 November 2021
18:00 (17:00 WEST)

Bosnia and Herzegovina	0–2	Portugal
	Report	Correia 14'; Melão 73'

Estádio Algarve, Faro/Loulé
Referee: Maika Vanderstichel (France)

==== Group A5 ====
Pos	Team	Pld	W	D	L	GF	GA	GD	Pts	Promotion
1	Poland (H)	3	2	1	0	3	0	+3	7	Transfer to Round 2 (League A)
2	Russia	3	1	1	1	2	1	+1	4	Transfer to Round 2 (League A)
3	England	3	1	0	2	1	4	−3	3 (Note: Ranked on head-to-head points: England 3, Belgium 0.)	Transfer to Round 2 (League A)
4	Belgium	3	1	0	2	1	2	−1	3	Relegated to Round 2 (League B)

Source: UEFA
Rules for classification: Qualification tiebreakers
(H) Hosts
Notes:
4 October 2021
15:30

Belgium	0–1	Poland
	Report	Rohn 88'

Stadion Miejski im. Grzegorza Duneckiego, Toruń
Referee: Neslihan Muratdağı (Turkey)
4 October 2021
15:30

England	0–2	Russia
	Report	Svistunova 70', 75' (pen.)

Stadion Miejski, Inowrocław
Referee: Deborah Anex (Switzerland)

7 October 2021
15:30

Poland	0–0	Russia
	Report

Stadion Miejski im. Grzegorza Duneckiego, Toruń
Referee: Neslihan Muratdağı (Turkey)
7 October 2021
15:30

England	1–0	Belgium
Lackey 29'	Report

Bydgoszcz Stadium, Bydgoszcz
Referee: Triinu Laos (Estonia)

10 October 2021
11:00

Russia	0–1	Belgium
	Report	De Meester 77'

Stadion Miejski, Inowrocław
Referee: Deborah Anex (Switzerland)
10 October 2021
11:00

Poland	2–0	England
Kowalczyk 42'; Kuleczka 83'	Report

Bydgoszcz Stadium, Bydgoszcz
Referee: Triinu Laos (Estonia)

==== Group A6 ====
Pos	Team	Pld	W	D	L	GF	GA	GD	Pts	Promotion
1	Denmark	3	2	1	0	7	3	+4	7	Transfer to Round 2 (League A)
2	Austria	3	1	2	0	9	6	+3	5	Transfer to Round 2 (League A)
3	Greece (H)	3	1	0	2	2	6	−4	3	Transfer to Round 2 (League A)
4	Switzerland	3	0	1	2	6	9	−3	1	Relegated to Round 2 (League B)

Source: UEFA
Rules for classification: Qualification tiebreakers
(H) Hosts
6 October 2021
12:00 (13:00 EEST)

Switzerland	4–4	Austria
Luyet 29'; Beney 31'; Tauriello 58'; Wandeler 86' (pen.)	Report	Aistleitner 37', 66' (pen.); Mädl 54' (pen.); Rukavina 82' (pen.)

Pampeloponnisiako Stadium, Patras
Referee: Merima Čelik (Bosnia and Herzegovina)
6 October 2021
18:00 (19:00 EEST)

Denmark	2–0	Greece
Ásgeirsdóttir 36'; Bødtcher-Jensen 52'	Report

Pampeloponnisiako Stadium, Patras
Referee: Abigail Marriott (England)

9 October 2021
12:00 (13:00 EEST)

Denmark	3–1	Switzerland
Sørensen 41', 69', 88'	Report	Knapp 36'

Pampeloponnisiako Stadium, Patras
Referee: Miriama Matulova (Slovakia)
9 October 2021
18:00 (19:00 EEST)

Austria	3–0	Greece
Mädl 30'; Natter 67'; Ojukwu 87' (pen.)	Report

Pampeloponnisiako Stadium, Patras
Referee: Merima Čelik (Bosnia and Herzegovina)

12 October 2021
14:00 (15:00 EEST)

Greece	2–1	Switzerland
Lazarakis 26'; Karipidis 78'	Report	Beney 67'

Papacharalambeio Ethniko Stadio Nafpaktou, Nafpaktos
Referee: Abigail Marriott (England)
12 October 2021
14:00 (15:00 EEST)

Austria	2–2	Denmark
Natter 11', 74'	Report	Jørgensen 55'; Ásgeirsdóttir 82'

Pampeloponnisiako Stadium, Patras
Referee: Miriama Matulova (Slovakia)

==== Group A7 ====
Pos	Team	Pld	W	D	L	GF	GA	GD	Pts	Promotion
1	Spain	3	3	0	0	9	1	+8	9	Transfer to Round 2 (League A)
2	Iceland	3	2	0	1	7	6	+1	6	Transfer to Round 2 (League A)
3	Serbia (H)	3	1	0	2	6	6	0	3	Transfer to Round 2 (League A)
4	Northern Ireland	3	0	0	3	1	10	−9	0	Relegated to Round 2 (League B)

Source: UEFA
Rules for classification: Qualification tiebreakers
(H) Hosts
24 September 2021
13:00

Spain	3–0	Northern Ireland
Librán 18'; Martret 42'; López 78'	Report

Serbian FA Sports Center - pitch 1, Stara Pazova
Referee: Minka Vekkeli (Finland)
24 September 2021
19:00

Iceland	4–1	Serbia
V. Kristjánsdóttir 14', 19'; Tryggvadóttir 40'; Gísladóttir 86'	Report	Matejic 23'

Serbian FA Sports Center - pitch 1, Stara Pazova
Referee: Liudmyla Telbukh (Ukraine)

27 September 2021
13:00

Spain	4–0	Iceland
Camacho 23', 64'; Íñigo 89'; Amezaga 90+4'	Report

Serbian FA Sports Center - pitch 1, Stara Pazova
Referee: Jurgita Mačikunytė (Lithuania)
27 September 2021
19:00

Serbia	4–0	Northern Ireland
Jestrović 4'; Stokić 62'; Matejic 77', 89'	Report

Serbian FA Sports Center - pitch 1, Stara Pazova
Referee: Liudmyla Telbukh (Ukraine)

30 September 2021
14:00

Northern Ireland	1–3	Iceland
McLaughlin 43'	Report	Óskarsdóttir 41'; Gísladóttir 54'; Sigurjónsdóttir 90+2'

Serbian FA Sports Center - pitch 6, Stara Pazova
Referee: Minka Vekkeli (Finland)
30 September 2021
14:00

Serbia	1–2	Spain
Stokić 59'	Report	Camacho 18'; Enrique 57'

Serbian FA Sports Center - pitch 1, Stara Pazova
Referee: Jurgita Mačikunytė (Lithuania)

=== League B ===
==== Group B1 ====
Pos	Team	Pld	W	D	L	GF	GA	GD	Pts	Promotion
1	Kosovo	3	2	1	0	18	3	+15	7	Promotion to Round 2 (League A)
2	Belarus	3	2	1	0	11	1	+10	7	Promotion to Round 2 (League A)
3	Luxembourg (H)	3	1	0	2	12	6	+6	3	Transfer to Round 2 (League B)
4	Georgia	3	0	0	3	0	31	−31	0	Transfer to Round 2 (League B)

Source: UEFA
Rules for classification: Qualification tiebreakers
(H) Hosts
24 September 2021
18:00

Kosovo	13–0	Georgia
Delija 19', 35'; Gjonbalaj 21'; Alija 45+1', 50', 66'; Gashi 55', 82', 85'; Racaj 62', 70', 88'; Shabani 90+2'	Report

Kaerjenger Dribbel, Bascharage
Referee: Gamze Durmuş (Turkey)
24 September 2021
18:00

Belarus	2–0	Luxembourg
Charlionak 15', 30'	Report

Terrain Bousbierg stadium, Bissen
Referee: Jelena Kumer (Croatia)

27 September 2021
18:00

Georgia	0–10	Luxembourg
	Report	Jorge Magalhães 5', 12', 85'; Oliveira Bras 7', 57', 65', 71', 72', 77'; Kirps 66'

Kaerjenger Dribbel, Bascharage
Referee: Gamze Durmuş (Turkey)
27 September 2021
18:00

Belarus	1–1	Kosovo
Siniauskaya 8'	Report	Racaj 71'

Terrain Bousbierg stadium, Bissen
Referee: Cristina Trandafir (Romania)

30 September 2021
18:00

Georgia	0–8	Belarus
	Report	Siniauskaya 5', 18', 75'; Charlionak 16', 19'; Mikhan 54'; Myslivets 59'; Maher 90'

Kaerjenger Dribbel, Bascharage
Referee: Cristina Trandafir (Romania)
30 September 2021
18:00

Luxembourg	2–4	Kosovo
Barbosa 12'; Oliveira Bras 53'	Report	Gashi 17'; Racaj 26', 63', 81'

Terrain Bousbierg stadium, Bissen
Referee: Gamze Durmuş (Turkey)

==== Group B2 ====
Pos	Team	Pld	W	D	L	GF	GA	GD	Pts	Promotion
1	Croatia (H)	3	3	0	0	14	0	+14	9	Promotion to Round 2 (League A)
2	Lithuania	3	1	1	1	4	5	−1	4	Transfer to Round 2 (League B)
3	Kazakhstan	3	1	1	1	4	10	−6	4	Transfer to Round 2 (League B)
4	Armenia	3	0	0	3	2	9	−7	0	Transfer to Round 2 (League B)

Source: UEFA
Rules for classification: Qualification tiebreakers
(H) Hosts
23 September 2021
11:00

Lithuania	2–2	Kazakhstan
Taldykina 4' (o.g.); Orynbay 13' (o.g.)	Report	Norbayeva 66'; Lozukova 90+2' (pen.)

Stadion Sv. Josip Radnik, Sesvete
Referee: Kristina Georgieva (Bulgaria)
23 September 2021
16:00

Armenia	0–5	Croatia
	Report	Mikulica 4'; Živković 10'; Čorak 18'; Kovačević 38'; Višnjić 44'

Stadion Lučko, Lučko
Referee: Alexandra Deligianni (Greece)

26 September 2021
11:00

Lithuania	2–1	Armenia
Proscevičiūtė 45+4', 73'	Report	Sayadyan 50'

Stadion Sv. Josip Radnik, Sesvete
Referee: Katarzyna Lisiecka-sek (Poland)
26 September 2021
16:00

Croatia	7–0	Kazakhstan
Mikulica 3'; Kovačević 31', 66'; Damjanović 36'; Vračević 43'; Šaban 56' (pen.); Vlastelica 90+4'	Report

Stadion Lučko, Lučko
Referee: Alexandra Deligianni (Greece)

29 September 2021
11:00

Kazakhstan	2–1	Armenia
Balzhan 42'; Taldykina 90+3'	Report	Grigoryan 55'

Stadion Sv. Josip Radnik, Sesvete
Referee: Kristina Georgieva (Bulgaria)
29 September 2021
11:00

Croatia	2–0	Lithuania
Živković 19'; Kovačević 50'	Report

Stadion Lučko, Lučko
Referee: Katarzyna Lisiecka-sek (Poland)

==== Group B3 ====
Pos	Team	Pld	W	D	L	GF	GA	GD	Pts	Promotion
1	Ukraine	3	3	0	0	11	0	+11	9	Promotion to Round 2 (League A)
2	Estonia (H)	3	2	0	1	15	1	+14	6	Transfer to Round 2 (League B)
3	North Macedonia	3	1	0	2	4	8	−4	3	Transfer to Round 2 (League B)
4	Moldova	3	0	0	3	0	21	−21	0	Transfer to Round 2 (League B)

Source: UEFA
Rules for classification: Qualification tiebreakers
(H) Hosts
27 September 2021
15:00 (16:00 EEST)

Ukraine	3–0	North Macedonia
Ptytsyna 22'; Honcharuk 52'; Kiselevych 78'	Report

Kadriorg Stadium, Tallinn
Referee: Réka Molnar (Hungary)
27 September 2021
18:00 (19:00 EEST)

Moldova	0–10	Estonia
	Report	Purgats 12'; Lillemets 20', 57'; Salei 25', 51', 75'; Orlova 37'; Uhtjärv 74'; Mirjam 80'; Erik 83'

Lilleküla Stadium, Tallinn
Referee: Teresa Oliveira (Portugal)

30 September 2021
15:00 (16:00 EEST)

Ukraine	7–0	Moldova
Bondarieva 7'; Borkovska 47'; Nevar 49'; Honcharuk 56'; Radionova 58' (pen.); Dub 60'; Skotsyk 83'	Report

Kadriorg Stadium, Tallinn
Referee: Viki De Cremer (Belgium)
30 September 2021
18:00 (19:00 EEST)

Estonia	5–0	North Macedonia
Tarkmeel 12'; Lillemets 13'; Salei 45', 77'; Orlova 45+1'	Report

Lilleküla Stadium, Tallinn
Referee: Teresa Oliveira (Portugal)

3 October 2021
12:00 (13:00 EEST)

North Macedonia	4–0	Moldova
Paneska 8' (pen.), 82'; Nastovska 14'; Sela 78'	Report

Kadriorg Stadium, Tallinn
Referee: Réka Molnar (Hungary)
3 October 2021
12:00 (13:00 EEST)

Estonia	0–1	Ukraine
	Report	Nevar 45+1'

Lilleküla Stadium, Tallinn
Referee: Viki De Cremer (Belgium)

==== Group B4 ====
Pos	Team	Pld	W	D	L	GF	GA	GD	Pts	Promotion
1	Slovakia (H)	2	2	0	0	9	0	+9	6	Promotion to Round 2 (League A)
2	Israel	2	1	0	1	5	7	−2	3	Transfer to Round 2 (League B)
3	Faroe Islands	2	0	0	2	1	8	−7	0	Transfer to Round 2 (League B)

Source: UEFA
Rules for classification: Qualification tiebreakers
(H) Hosts
8 November 2021
17:00

Slovakia	3–0	Faroe Islands
Nárožná 56'; Hrúziková 74'; Hlavinková 78'	Report

NTC Poprad, Poprad
Attendance: 53
Referee: Kristina Georgieva (Bulgaria)

11 November 2021
17:00

Faroe Islands	1–5	Israel
F. M. Jakobsen 45+1'	Report	Sribnenko 6', 17'; Gat 13'; Biru 51'; Elbaz 54'

NTC Poprad, Poprad
Attendance: 37
Referee: Katalin Sipos (Hungary)

14 November 2021
17:00

Israel	0–6	Slovakia
	Report	Hlavinková 17', 58'; Surová 25' (pen.), 45+2'; Hrúziková 40'; Pajunková 90+1'

NTC Poprad, Poprad
Attendance: 91
Referee: Marina Krupskaya (Russia)

==== Group B5 ====
Pos	Team	Pld	W	D	L	GF	GA	GD	Pts	Promotion
1	Romania	2	1	1	0	5	3	+2	4	Promotion to Round 2 (League A)
2	Turkey (H)	2	0	2	0	4	4	0	2	Transfer to Round 2 (League B)
3	Latvia	2	0	1	1	3	5	−2	1	Transfer to Round 2 (League B)

Source: UEFA
Rules for classification: Qualification tiebreakers
(H) Hosts
30 September 2021
17:00 (18:00 EEST)

Turkey	2–2	Romania
Yıldız 48', 64'	Report	Filip 13'; Roșu 39'

Arslan Zeki Demirci Sports Complex, Manavgat
Referee: Alexandra Collin (France)

3 October 2021
17:00 (18:00 EEST)

Romania	3–1	Latvia
Filip 51', 65'; Roșu 61' (pen.)	Report	Ščuka 18'

Arslan Zeki Demirci Sports Complex, Manavgat
Referee: Jelena Medjedovic (Serbia)

6 October 2021
17:00 (18:00 EEST)

Latvia	2–2	Turkey
Vuškāne 73', 90+6'	Report	Ekiz 69'; Cılız 75'

Arslan Zeki Demirci Sports Complex, Manavgat
Referee: Nadezhda Gorinova (Russia)

==== Group B6 ====
Pos	Team	Pld	W	D	L	GF	GA	GD	Pts	Promotion
1	Montenegro	2	2	0	0	14	2	+12	6	Promotion to Round 2 (League A)
2	Azerbaijan	2	0	1	1	4	9	−5	1	Transfer to Round 2 (League B)
3	Albania (H)	2	0	1	1	4	11	−7	1	Transfer to Round 2 (League B)

Source: UEFA
Rules for classification: Qualification tiebreakers
(H) Hosts
24 September 2021
16:00

Albania	1–8	Montenegro
Borci 88' (pen.)	Report	Osmajić 10', 69'; Boričić 14'; Stanić 30', 52'; Krivokapić 59'; Čađenović 74'; Bambur 90+4'

Elbasan Arena, Elbasan
Referee: Valentina Finzi (Italy)

27 September 2021
16:00

Montenegro	6–1	Azerbaijan
Boričić 20', 51', 54'; Osmajić 38', 85'; Malesija 80'	Report	Hasanova 71' (pen.)

Elbasan Arena, Elbasan
Referee: Ainara Acevedo (Spain)

30 September 2021
16:00

Azerbaijan	3–3	Albania
Piriyeva 29', 40'; Kesmez 45+2'	Report	Borci 7' (pen.); Alijaj 21'; Coka 86'

Elbasan Arena, Elbasan
Referee: Marina Krupskaya (Russia)

==== Ranking of second-placed teams ====
To determine the best runner-up, only the results of the runner-up teams against the first and third-placed teams in their group were taken into account.

Pos	Grp	Team	Pld	W	D	L	GF	GA	GD	Pts	Qualification
1	B1	Belarus	2	1	1	0	3	1	+2	4	Promotion to Round 2 (League A)
2	B3	Estonia	2	1	0	1	5	1	+4	3	
3	B4	Israel	2	1	0	1	5	7	−2	3	
4	B5	Turkey	2	0	2	0	4	4	0	2	
5	B2	Lithuania	2	0	1	1	2	4	−2	1	
6	B6	Azerbaijan	2	0	1	1	4	9	−5	1	

Source: UEFA
Rules for classification: 1) points; 2) goal difference; 3) goals scored; 4) disciplinary points; 5) coefficient ranking.

== Round 2 ==
=== Draw ===
The 21 teams of Round 1 League A and the 7 teams of Round 2 League B (six group winners and the best runner-up) are drawn in seven groups of four teams.

The teams were seeded according to their results in the round 1 (Regulations Article 15.01).

Teams entering League A

Pos	Grp	Team	Pld	W	D	L	GF	GA	GD	Pts	Seeding
1	A4	Germany	3	3	0	0	12	1	+11	9	Pot A
2	A7	Spain	3	3	0	0	9	1	+8	9	Pot A
3	A1	Republic of Ireland	3	3	0	0	8	2	+6	9	Pot A
4	A3	Sweden	3	2	1	0	10	2	+8	7	Pot A
5	A6	Denmark	3	2	1	0	7	3	+4	7	Pot A
6	A5	Poland	3	2	1	0	3	0	+3	7	Pot A
7	A2	Netherlands	2	1	1	0	4	1	+3	4	Pot A
8	A3	France	3	2	1	0	9	2	+7	7	Pot B
9	A1	Norway	3	2	0	1	10	3	+7	6	Pot B
10	A4	Portugal	3	2	0	1	9	3	+6	6	Pot B
11	A7	Iceland	3	2	0	1	7	6	+1	6	Pot B
12	A6	Austria	3	1	2	0	9	6	+3	5	Pot B
13	A5	Russia	3	1	1	1	2	1	+1	4	Pot B
14	A2	Czech Republic	2	0	2	0	2	2	0	2	Pot B
15	A7	Serbia	3	1	0	2	6	6	0	3	Pot C
16	A5	England	3	1	0	2	1	4	−3	3	Pot C
17	A1	Hungary	3	1	0	2	3	7	−4	3	Pot C
18	A6	Greece	3	1	0	2	2	6	−4	3	Pot C
19	A3	Italy	3	1	0	2	2	8	−6	3	Pot C
20	A4	Finland	3	1	0	2	4	11	−7	3	Pot C
21	A2	Slovenia	2	0	1	1	1	4	−3	1	Pot C
22	B2	Croatia	3	3	0	0	14	0	+14	9	Pot D
23	B3	Ukraine	3	3	0	0	11	0	+11	9	Pot D
24	B1	Kosovo	3	2	1	0	18	3	+15	7	Pot D
25	B6	Montenegro	2	2	0	0	14	2	+12	6	Pot D
26	B4	Slovakia	2	2	0	0	9	0	+9	6	Pot D
27	B5	Romania	2	1	1	0	5	3	+2	4	Pot D
28	B1	Belarus	2	1	1	0	3	1	+2	4	Pot D

Source: UEFA
Rules for classification: 1) round 1 position; 2) points; 3) goal difference; 4) goals scored; 5) disciplinary points; 6) coefficient.

Teams entering League B

Pos	Grp	Team	Pld	W	D	L	GF	GA	GD	Pts	Seeding
1	A5	Belgium	3	1	0	2	1	3	−2	3	Pot A
2	A6	Switzerland	3	0	1	2	6	9	−3	1	Pot A
3	A2	Scotland	0	0	0	0	0	0	0	0	Pot A
4	A7	Northern Ireland	3	0	0	3	1	10	−9	0	Pot A
5	A3	Wales	3	0	0	3	0	9	−9	0 (Note: Disciplinary points: Wales –6, Bulgaria –9.)	Pot A
6	A1	Bulgaria	3	0	0	3	0	9	−9	0	Pot A
7	B3	Estonia	3	2	0	1	15	1	+14	6	Pot B
8	B2	Lithuania	3	1	1	1	4	5	−1	4	Pot B
9	B4	Israel	2	1	0	1	5	7	−2	3	Pot B
10	B5	Turkey	2	0	2	0	4	4	0	2	Pot B
11	B6	Azerbaijan	2	0	1	1	4	9	−5	1	Pot B
12	A4	Bosnia and Herzegovina	3	0	0	3	0	10	−10	0	Pot B
13	B2	Kazakhstan	3	1	1	1	4	10	−6	4	Pot C
14	B1	Luxembourg	3	1	0	2	12	6	+6	3	Pot C
15	B3	North Macedonia	3	1	0	2	4	8	−4	3	Pot C
16	B5	Latvia	2	0	1	1	3	5	−2	1	Pot C
17	B6	Albania	2	0	1	1	4	11	−7	1	Pot C
18	B4	Faroe Islands	2	0	0	2	1	8	−7	0	Pot C
19	B2	Armenia	3	0	0	3	2	9	−7	0	Pot C
20	B3	Moldova	3	0	0	3	0	21	−21	0	Pot C
21	B1	Georgia	3	0	0	3	0	31	−31	0	Pot C

Source: UEFA
Rules for classification: 1) round 1 position; 2) points; 3) goal difference; 4) goals scored; 5) disciplinary points; 6) coefficient.

=== League A ===
Times are CET/CEST, (Note: CET (UTC+1) for dates up to 27 March 2022, and CEST (UTC+2) for dates thereafter.) as listed by UEFA (local times, if different, are in parentheses).

==== Group A1 ====
Pos	Team	Pld	W	D	L	GF	GA	GD	Pts	Promotion
1	Finland	3	2	1	0	7	2	+5	7	Qualified for the final tournament
2	Iceland	3	2	1	0	6	2	+4	7	
3	Republic of Ireland (H)	3	0	1	2	3	7	−4	1	
4	Slovakia	3	0	1	2	1	6	−5	1	Relegated to League B for the next tournament qualification

Source: UEFA
(H) Hosts
23 March 2022
15:00 (14:00 IST)

Finland	1–1	Iceland
Seiro 42'	Report	K. Tryggvadóttir 15'

UCD Bowl, Dublin
Referee: Cristina Trandafir (Romania)
23 March 2022
20:00 (19:00 IST)

Republic of Ireland	1–1	Slovakia
Lawrence 88'	Report	Surová 72' (pen.)

Tallaght Stadium, Dublin
Referee: Olivia Tschon (Austria)

26 March 2022
13:00 (12:00 IST)

Iceland	1–0	Slovakia
Í. Tryggvadóttir 84'	Report

Richmond Park, Dublin
Referee: Cristina Trandafir (Romania)
26 March 2022
15:00 (14:00 IST)

Republic of Ireland	1–2	Finland
Larkin 58'	Report	Mäkipelkola 90+2'; Thompson 90+5' (o.g.)

Tallaght Stadium, Dublin
Referee: Zulema Gonzalez Gonzalez (Spain)

29 March 2022
13:00 (12:00 IST)

Slovakia	0–4	Finland
	Report	Kiviranta 54' (pen.); L. Kalske 76'; Walta 82'; Heikkinen 85'

UCD Bowl, Dublin
Referee: Olivia Tschon (Austria)
29 March 2022
13:00 (12:00 IST)

Iceland	4–1	Republic of Ireland
Hjartardóttir 13'; Óskarsdóttir 41'; Halldórsdóttir 79', 90+2'	Report	Larkin 4'

Tallaght Stadium, Dublin
Referee: Zulema Gonzalez Gonzalez (Spain)

==== Group A2 ====
Pos	Team	Pld	W	D	L	GF	GA	GD	Pts	Promotion
1	Spain	2	2	0	0	8	0	+8	6	Qualified for the final tournament
2	Hungary (H)	2	1	0	1	3	6	−3	3	
3	Czech Republic	2	0	0	2	0	5	−5	0	
4	Ukraine	0	0	0	0	0	0	0	0	Withdrew (Note: Due to the Russian invasion of Ukraine.)

Source: UEFA
(H) Hosts
Notes:
7 April 2022
18:00

Hungary	3–0	Czech Republic
Nagy 30'; Sinka 60'; Kern 90+1'	Report

Globall Football Park, Telki
Referee: Oxana Cruc (Moldavia)

10 April 2022
18:00

Spain	6–0	Hungary
Camacho 28'; Corrales 40'; Villafañe 60'; Capdevila 67', 74', 90'	Report

Globall Football Park, Telki
Referee: Jelena Cvetković (Serbia)

13 April 2022
13:00

Czech Republic	0–2	Spain
	Report	Camacho 18'; Pujols 37'

Globall Football Park, Telki
Referee: Jelena Cvetković (Serbia)

==== Group A3 ====
Pos	Team	Pld	W	D	L	GF	GA	GD	Pts	Promotion
1	Norway (H)	3	2	0	1	16	3	+13	6 (Note: Norway ahead on goal difference in head-to-head matches among tied teams: Norway +1, Serbia 0, Sweden –1.)	Qualified for the final tournament
2	Serbia	3	2	0	1	12	4	+8	6	
3	Sweden	3	2	0	1	7	4	+3	6	
4	Romania	3	0	0	3	1	25	−24	0	Relegated to League B for the next tournament qualification

Source: UEFA
(H) Hosts
Notes:
24 March 2022
13:00

Sweden	5–1	Romania
Wessman 3', 8'; Skoog 4', 45+1'; Persson Welin 12'	Report	Pinzariu 62'

Sandnes Stadion, Sandnes
Referee: Teresa Oliveira (Portugal)
24 March 2022
16:00

Serbia	3–2	Norway
Josić 5'; Stokić 25'; Marković 78'	Report	Gaupset 39'; Nilsen 70'

Viking Stadion, Stavanger
Referee: Triinu Laos (Estonia)

27 March 2022
13:00

Sweden	2–1	Serbia
Skoog 22'; Svanström 72'	Report	Stokić 41'

Viking Stadion, Stavanger
Referee: Michèle Schmölzer (Switzerland)
27 March 2022
16:00

Norway	12–0	Romania
Folland 11', 24', 38'; Gaupset 29' (pen.), 32', 35', 52'; Lervik 33'; Taraldsen 79'; Nilsen 83'; Rasmussen 84'; Rame 90+3'	Report

Sandnes Stadion, Sandnes
Referee: Triinu Laos (Estonia)

30 March 2022
16:00

Norway	2–0	Sweden
Gaupset 10' (pen.); Sesay 42'	Report

Sandnes Stadion, Sandnes
Referee: Michèle Schmölzer (Switzerland)
30 March 2022
16:00

Romania	0–8	Serbia
	Report	Stokić 23', 57'; Matejić 32', 56'; Stojić 42'; Marković 54', 71'; Vesić 90+3'

Viking Stadion, Stavanger
Referee: Teresa Oliveira (Portugal)

==== Group A4 ====
Pos	Team	Pld	W	D	L	GF	GA	GD	Pts	Promotion
1	Denmark (H)	1	1	0	0	1	0	+1	3	Qualified for the final tournament
2	Greece	1	0	0	1	0	1	−1	0	
3	Belarus	0	0	0	0	0	0	0	0	Withdrew
4	Russia	0	0	0	0	0	0	0	0	Suspended (Note: On 28 February 2022, UEFA suspended Russian clubs and national teams from all competitions.)

First match(es) will be played: 16 March 2022. Source: UEFA
(H) Hosts
Notes:
16 March 2022
18:00

Denmark	1–0	Greece
Ásgeirsdóttir 50'	Report

Helsingør Stadium, Helsingør
Referee: Gamze Durmuş (Turkey)

==== Group A5 ====
Pos	Team	Pld	W	D	L	GF	GA	GD	Pts	Promotion
1	Germany	3	3	0	0	9	3	+6	9	Qualified for the final tournament
2	Austria	3	2	0	1	12	3	+9	6	
3	Slovenia	3	1	0	2	4	7	−3	3	
4	Kosovo (H)	3	0	0	3	1	13	−12	0	Relegated to League B for the next tournament qualification

Source: UEFA
(H) Hosts
23 March 2022
11:00

Germany	4–0	Kosovo
Veit 54'; Steiner 58', 69'; Platner 77'	Report

Fadil Vokrri Stadium, Pristina
Referee: Michalina Diakow (Poland)
23 March 2022
17:00

Slovenia	0–4	Austria
	Report	Mädl 26', 39', 69'; Ojukwu 82'

Zahir Pajaziti Stadium, Podujevo
Referee: Viki De Cremer (Belgium)

26 March 2022
12:00

Germany	2–1	Slovenia
Veit 32'; Janzen 56'	Report	Kern 18'

Zahir Pajaziti Stadium, Podujevo
Referee: Lovisa Johansson (Sweden)
26 March 2022
16:00

Austria	6–0	Kosovo
Mädl 10', 24', 53'; Natter 31'; Spinn 47'; Aistleitner 51'	Report

Fadil Vokrri Stadium, Pristina
Referee: Viki De Cremer (Belgium)

29 March 2022
12:00

Austria	2–3	Germany
Ojukwu 17' (pen.); Mädl 46'	Report	Steiner 66'; Reimoller 69'; Şehitler 70'

Fadil Vokrri Stadium, Pristina
Referee: Lovisa Johansson (Sweden)
29 March 2022
12:00

Kosovo	1–3	Slovenia
Gashi 38' (pen.)	Report	Karic 50'; Osojnik 75'; Kramzar 85' (pen.)

Zahir Pajaziti Stadium, Podujevo
Referee: Michalina Diakow (Poland)

==== Group A6 ====
Pos	Team	Pld	W	D	L	GF	GA	GD	Pts	Promotion
1	France	3	3	0	0	13	2	+11	9	Qualified for the final tournament
2	England	3	2	0	1	10	2	+8	6	
3	Poland (H)	3	1	0	2	6	7	−1	3	
4	Croatia	3	0	0	3	0	18	−18	0	Relegated to League B for the next tournament qualification

Updated to match(es) played on 29 March 2022. Source: UEFA
(H) Hosts
24 March 2022
11:00

England	1–2	France
Barry 84'	Report	Swierot 13'; Chossenotte 27'

Stadion Miejski, Niepołomice
Referee: Réka Molnár (Hungary)
24 March 2022
14:00

Poland	5–0	Croatia
Szymczak 17', 18'; Grzywińska 30'; Bałdyga 90+1'; Piętakiewicz 90+5'	Report

Stadion RKS Garbarnia, Kraków
Referee: Franziska Wildfeuer (Germany)

27 March 2022
11:00

France	5–0	Croatia
Rossi 12'; Mossard 13'; Touriss 23', 36'; Mendy 67'	Report

Stadion Miejski, Niepołomice
Referee: Réka Molnár (Hungary)
27 March 2022
14:00

Poland	0–1	England
	Report	Baker 28'

Stadion RKS Garbarnia, Kraków
Referee: Miriama Matulova (Slovakia)

30 March 2022
11:00

France	6–1	Poland
Swierot 13', 45'; Chossenotte 17'; Rossi 62'; Marques 72'; Elimbi Gilbert 88'	Report	Marques 1' (o.g.)

Stadion Miejski, Niepołomice
Referee: Miriama Matulova (Slovakia)
30 March 2022
11:00

Croatia	0–8	England
	Report	Potter 8', 27'; Earl 16'; Rabjohn 40'; Agyemang 44' (pen.), 45+2'; Dahou 50' (pen.); Aspin 89'

Stadion RKS Garbarnia, Kraków
Referee: Franziska Wildfeuer (Germany)

==== Group A7 ====
Pos	Team	Pld	W	D	L	GF	GA	GD	Pts	Promotion
1	Netherlands	3	3	0	0	17	1	+16	9	Qualified for the final tournament
2	Portugal (H)	3	2	0	1	10	5	+5	6	
3	Italy	3	1	0	2	13	5	+8	3	
4	Montenegro	3	0	0	3	1	30	−29	0	Relegated to League B for the next tournament qualification

Updated to match(es) played on 22 March 2022. Source: UEFA
(H) Hosts
16 March 2022
11:00 (10:00 WET)

Netherlands	11–0	Montenegro
Thomas 5', 57'; Tolhoek 22'; Huizenga 24', 49', 72', 74'; Kroese 78' (pen.), 81', 90+2', 90+4'	Report

Parque Desportivo Sant'Ana, Penalva do Castelo
Referee: Lucie Šulcová (Czech Republic)
16 March 2022
16:00 (15:00 WET)

Italy	1–2	Portugal
Dragoni 86'	Report	Mariano 8'; Simas 90+4'

Fontelo Municipal, Viseu
Referee: Victoria Beyer (France)

19 March 2022
12:00 (11:00 WET)

Netherlands	3–1	Italy
Huizenga 13' (pen.), 71'; Kroese 23'	Report	Cesarini 45'

Municipal, Santa Comba Dão
Referee: Katalin Sipos (Hungary)
19 March 2022
16:00 (15:00 WET)

Portugal	8–1	Montenegro
Simas 5' (pen.), 6', 26'; Pinto de Almeida 9'; L. Martins 45+5', 53'; Gago 70'; A. Ferreira 75' (pen.)	Report	Đurković 76'

Fontelo Municipal, Viseu
Referee: Victoria Beyer (France)

22 March 2022
16:00 (15:00 WET)

Portugal	0–3	Netherlands
	Report	Kroese 2'; De Ridder 58', 85'

Estádio João Cardoso, Tondela
Referee: Katalin Sipos (Hungary)
22 March 2022
16:00 (15:00 WET)

Montenegro	0–11	Italy
	Report	Bulić 16' (o.g.); Cesarini 23', 38'; Congia 26'; Bernardi 29', 34'; Schatzer 31'; Dragoni 55'; Berveglieri 85'; Renzotti 87'; Marchetti 90'

Parque Desportivo Sant'Ana, Penalva do Castelo
Referee: Lucie Šulcová (Czech Republic)

=== League B ===
Times are CET/CEST, (Note: CET (UTC+1) for dates up to 27 March 2022, and CEST (UTC+2) for dates thereafter.) as listed by UEFA (local times, if different, are in parentheses).

==== Group B1 ====
Pos	Team	Pld	W	D	L	GF	GA	GD	Pts	Promotion
1	Northern Ireland	3	3	0	0	7	1	+6	9	Promoted to League A for the next tournament qualification
2	Israel (H)	3	2	0	1	7	3	+4	6	
3	Luxembourg	3	0	1	2	2	7	−5	1	
4	Faroe Islands	3	0	1	2	0	5	−5	1	

Source: UEFA
(H) Hosts
10 March 2022
11:00 (12:00 IST)

Northern Ireland	2–1	Luxembourg
Wildgoose 83'; Kerr 89' (pen.)	Report	Kirps 27' (pen.)

National team complex, Shefayim
Referee: Sofik Torosyan (Armenia)
10 March 2022
16:00 (17:00 IST)

Faroe Islands	0–2	Israel
	Report	Fenta 70'; Sribnenko 82'

Ramat Gan Stadium, Ramat Gan
Referee: Kristina Georgieva (Bulgaria)

13 March 2022
11:00 (12:00 IST)

Northern Ireland	3–0	Faroe Islands
Gargan 25'; Wildgoose 66'; Reid 71'	Report

National team complex, Shefayim
Referee: Deborah Anex (Switzerland)
13 March 2022
15:00 (16:00 IST)

Israel	5–1	Luxembourg
Gat 7' (pen.); Workou 9'; Sribnenko 45'; Biru 50' (pen.); Peretz 89'	Report	Alves 79'

Ramat Gan Stadium, Ramat Gan
Referee: Kristina Georgieva (Bulgaria)

16 March 2022
16:00 (17:00 IST)

Luxembourg	0–0	Faroe Islands
	Report

National team complex, Shefayim
Referee: Sofik Torosyan (Armenia)
16 March 2022
16:00 (17:00 IST)

Israel	0–2	Northern Ireland
	Report	McIntyre 32'; Tweedie 88'

Ramat Gan Stadium, Ramat Gan
Referee: Deborah Anex (Switzerland)

==== Group B2 ====
Pos	Team	Pld	W	D	L	GF	GA	GD	Pts	Promotion
1	Turkey	2	2	0	0	9	1	+8	6	Promoted to League A for the next tournament qualification
2	Latvia	2	1	0	1	3	5	−2	3	
3	Armenia (H)	2	0	0	2	0	6	−6	0	
4	Wales	0	0	0	0	0	0	0	0	Withdrew (Note: On 10 March 2022, the Football Association of Wales withdrew from the Round 2 of the UEFA Women’s Under-17s Championship due to safety concerns.)

Source: UEFA
(H) Hosts
Notes:
15 March 2022
12:00 (15:00 AMT)

Armenia	0–4	Turkey
	Report	Yıldız 46', 71'; Oğuz 86'; Boran 90+2'

Armavir City Stadium, Armavir
Referee: Vivian Peeters (Netherlands)

18 March 2022
11:00 (14:00 AMT)

Turkey	5–1	Latvia
Yıldız 7', 21', 44', 75'; Sürül 16'	Report	Vuškāne 54'

Yerevan Football Academy Stadium, Yerevan
Referee: Katarzyna Lisiecka-sek (Poland)

21 March 2022
12:00 (15:00 AMT)

Latvia	2–0	Armenia
Vuškāne 42', 90'	Report

Armavir City Stadium, Armavir
Referee: Rasa Grigonė (Lithuania)

==== Group B3 ====
Pos	Team	Pld	W	D	L	GF	GA	GD	Pts	Promotion
1	Scotland	3	3	0	0	21	0	+21	9	Promoted to League A for the next tournament qualification
2	Albania (H)	3	2	0	1	5	8	−3	6	
3	North Macedonia	3	1	0	2	5	13	−8	3	
4	Azerbaijan	3	0	0	3	0	10	−10	0	

Source: UEFA
(H) Hosts
8 March 2022
12:00

Scotland	9–0	North Macedonia
McLeary 7', 75'; Jardine 16'; Bates 31'; Taylor 33'; McAuley 72'; J. Pavlovska 83' (o.g.); Berry 90+1'; Livingstone 90+3'	Report

Arena Egnatia, Rrogozhinë
Referee: Ana Maria Alexandra Terteleac (Romania)
8 March 2022
14:30

Albania	1–0	Azerbaijan
Borci 37'	Report

Elbasan Arena, Elbasan
Referee: Jurgita Mačikunytė (Lithuania)

11 March 2022
12:00

Azerbaijan	0–3	North Macedonia
	Report	Ilievska 27'; Nastovska 39'; Gjorgjieva 90'

Elbasan Arena, Elbasan
Referee: Jurgita Mačikunytė (Lithuania)
11 March 2022
14:30

Scotland	6–0	Albania
Berry 66', 71', 74', 79'; McLeary 90+3'; Watson 90+5' (pen.)	Report

Elbasan Arena, Elbasan
Referee: Lizzy Van Der Helm (Netherlands)

14 March 2022
14:30

North Macedonia	2–4	Albania
J. Pavlovska 14'; Sela 70'	Report	Vasa 1'; Muca 29', 72'; Kodra 58'

Elbasan Arena, Elbasan
Referee: Ana Maria Alexandra Terteleac (Romania)
14 March 2022
14:30

Azerbaijan	0–6	Scotland
	Report	Burchill 20'; Mcleary 23', 43'; Gray 29'; Mcauley 61'; Berry 62'

Arena Egnatia, Rrogozhinë
Referee: Lizzy Van Der Helm (Netherlands)

==== Group B4 ====
Pos	Team	Pld	W	D	L	GF	GA	GD	Pts	Promotion
1	Estonia	2	2	0	0	9	5	+4	6	Promoted to League A for the next tournament qualification
2	Bulgaria (H)	2	1	0	1	4	4	0	3	
3	Georgia	2	0	0	2	2	6	−4	0	

Source: UEFA
(H) Hosts
16 March 2022
13:30 (14:30 EET)

Bulgaria	3–4	Estonia
Genova 23'; Cwetkowa 27'; Demirova 51'	Report	Sarapik 36'; Grutop 55', 90+2'; Lilles 87'

Stadion Hadzhi Dimitar, Sliven
Referee: Jelena Jermolajeva (Latvia)

19 March 2022
13:30 (14:30 EET)

Estonia	5–2	Georgia
Välba 2'; Orlova 11', 16'; Volkov 35'; Tarkmeel 74'	Report	Bukhrikidze 34' (pen.); Ambalia 47'

Stadion Hadzhi Dimitar, Sliven
Referee: Merima Čelik (Bosnia and Herzegovina)

22 March 2022
13:30 (14:30 EET)

Georgia	0–1	Bulgaria
	Report	Cwetkowa 58'

Stadion Hadzhi Dimitar, Sliven
Referee: Emanuela Rusta (Albania)

==== Group B5 ====
Pos	Team	Pld	W	D	L	GF	GA	GD	Pts	Promotion
1	Switzerland	2	2	0	0	15	0	+15	6	Promoted to League A for the next tournament qualification
2	Lithuania (H)	2	1	0	1	7	5	+2	3	
3	Kazakhstan	2	0	0	2	2	19	−17	0	

Source: UEFA
(H) Hosts
23 March 2022
17:00 (18:00 EET)

Lithuania	0–3	Switzerland
	Report	Wandeler 51', 60'; Elezi 53'

LFF Stadium, Vilnius
Referee: Alexandra Collin (France)

26 March 2022
13:00 (14:00 EET)

Switzerland	12–0	Kazakhstan
Luyet 3', 5', 73', 81'; Beney 11', 18', 39', 90+2'; Wandeler 30'; Ibishaj 45'; Egli 60', 74'	Report

LFF Stadium, Vilnius
Referee: Tanja Racic (Bosnia and Herzegovina)

29 March 2022
13:00 (14:00 EEST)

Kazakhstan	2–7	Lithuania
Maksat 16', 39'	Report	Kriaučiūnaitė 34', 80', 88'; Kazarina 37'; Mamyrova 42' (o.g.); Švarcaitė 62', 64'

LFF Stadium, Vilnius
Referee: Cansu Tryak (Turkey)

==== Group B6 ====
Pos	Team	Pld	W	D	L	GF	GA	GD	Pts	Promotion
1	Belgium	2	2	0	0	9	1	+8	6	Promoted to League A for the next tournament qualification
2	Bosnia and Herzegovina (H)	2	1	0	1	6	2	+4	3	Promoted to League A for the next tournament qualification
3	Moldova	2	0	0	2	0	12	−12	0	

Updated to match(es) played on 17 March 2022. Source: UEFA
(H) Hosts
14 March 2022
15:00

Bosnia and Herzegovina	1–2	Belgium
Avdić 53'	Report	De Meester 27'; Bergen 58'

Stadion Pecara, Široki Brijeg
Referee: Neslihan Muratdagi (Turkey)

17 March 2022
15:00

Belgium	7–0	Moldova
Zang Bikoula 3'; François 6', 48'; De Meester 9', 23'; Bernard 59'; Bergen 68'	Report

Stadion Pecara, Široki Brijeg
Referee: Meitar Shemesh (Israel)

20 March 2022
15:00

Moldova	0–5	Bosnia and Herzegovina
	Report	Dizdarević 40'; Dedić 64', 90+4'; Filipović 69'; Gavrilović 77'

Stadion Pecara, Široki Brijeg
Referee: Tatyana Sorokopudova (Kazakhstan)

==== Ranking of second-placed teams ====
To determine the best runner-up, only the results of the runner-up teams against the first and third-placed teams in their group are taken into account.

Pos	Grp	Team	Pld	W	D	L	GF	GA	GD	Pts	Qualification
1	B6	Bosnia and Herzegovina	2	1	0	1	6	2	+4	3	Promotion to League A for the next tournament qualification
2	B5	Lithuania	2	1	0	1	7	5	+2	3	
3	B1	Israel	2	1	0	1	5	3	+2	3	
4	B4	Bulgaria	2	1	0	1	4	4	0	3	
5	B2	Latvia	2	1	0	1	3	5	−2	3	
6	B3	Albania	2	1	0	1	4	8	−4	3	

Source: UEFA
Rules for classification: 1) points; 2) goal difference; 3) goals scored; 4) disciplinary points; 5) higher position in the round 1 league ranking.

== Qualified teams ==
The following eight teams qualified to the final tournament.

Team	Qualified as	Qualified on	Previous appearances in Under-17 Euro^{1} only U-17 era (since 2008)
Bosnia and Herzegovina	Hosts	24 September 2019	0 (debut)
Denmark	Round 2 Group A4 winners	16 March 2022	3 (2008, 2012, 2019)
Netherlands	Round 2 Group A7 winners	22 March 2022	4 (2010, 2017, 2018, 2019)
Germany	Round 2 Group A5 winners	29 March 2022	11 (**2008**, **2009**, 2010, 2011, **2012**, **2014**, 2015, **2016**, **2017**, 2018, **2019**)
Finland	Round 2 Group A1 winners	29 March 2022	1 (2018)
France	Round 2 Group A6 winners	30 March 2022	7 (2008, 2009, 2011, 2012, 2014, 2015, 2017)
Norway	Round 2 Group A3 winners	30 March 2022	4 (2009, 2015, 2016, 2017)
Spain	Round 2 Group A2 winners	13 April 2022	10 (2009, **2010**, **2011**, 2013, 2014, **2015**, 2016, 2017, **2018**, 2019)

^{1} Bold indicates champions for that year. Italic indicates hosts for that year.

== Goalscorers ==
In Round 1 there were 272 goals scored in 66 matches, for an average of 4.12 goals per match.

In Round 2 there were 274 goals scored in 58 matches, for an average of 4.72 goals per match.

In total, there were 546 goals scored in 124 matches, for an average of 4.4 goals per match.

9 goals

- (Austria) Valentina Mädl
- (Netherlands) Hanna Huizenga

8 goals

- (Norway) Signe Gaupset
- (Turkey) Mine Yıldız

7 goals

- (Kosovo) Aurora Racaj
- (Luxembourg) Luisa Oliveira Bras
- (Sweden) Line Wessman

6 goals

- (Netherlands) Fieke Kroese
- (Portugal) Inês Simas
- (Scotland) Laura Berry
- (Serbia) Sara Stokić
- (Switzerland) Iman Beney

5 goals

- (Estonia) Anette Salei
- (France) Julie Swierot
- (Germany) Marie Steiner
- (Kosovo) Rreze Gashi
- (Latvia) Santa Vuškāne
- (Norway) Mina Folland
- (Republic of Ireland) Abbie Larkin
- (Scotland) Jodi McLeary
- (Serbia) Nina Matejić
- (Sweden) Tuva Skoog
- (Switzerland) Naomi Luyet

4 goals

- (Austria) Linda Natter
- (Belarus) Alina Charlionak
- (Belarus) Hanna Siniauskaya
- (Belgium) Thirsa De Meester
- (Croatia) Klara Kovačević
- (Estonia) Aleksandra Orlova
- (France) Shana Chossenotte
- (Germany) Alara Şehitler
- (Israel) Eva Sribnenko
- (Montenegro) Ivana Boričić
- (Montenegro) Tatjana Osmajić
- (Norway) Linneah Rasmussen
- (Spain) Carla Camacho
- (Switzerland) Leila Wandeler

3 goals

- (Albania) Klaudia Borci
- (Austria) Isabel Aistleitner
- (Austria) Nicole Ojukwu
- (Denmark) Emilía Ásgeirsdóttir
- (Denmark) Jóhanna Sørensen
- (Estonia) Kirkeliis Lillemets
- (Germany) Paulina Platner
- (Italy) Erin Cesarini
- (Italy) Giulia Dragoni
- (Kosovo) Rinesa Alija
- (Lithuania) Ema Kriaučiūnaitė
- (Luxembourg) Caroline Jorge Magalhães
- (Norway) Anna Lervik
- (Portugal) Lara Martins
- (Romania) Anamaria Filip
- (Serbia) Andjela Marković
- (Slovakia) Linda Hlavinková
- (Slovakia) Aneta Surová

2 goals

- (Albania) Anversa Muca
- (Azerbaijan) Shakar Piriyeva
- (Belgium) Anouck Bergen
- (Belgium) Nadège François
- (Bosnia and Herzegovina) Sejla Dedić
- (Bulgaria) Wiktoria Cwetkowa
- (Croatia) Petra Mikulica
- (Croatia) Barbara Živković
- (England) Michelle Agyemang
- (England) Alexia Potter
- (Estonia) Vanessa Grutop
- (Estonia) Helina Tarkmeel
- (Finland) Elli Seiro
- (France) Louna Belhout Achi
- (France) Alice Marques
- (France) Fanny Rossi
- (France) Imane Touriss
- (Germany) Loreen Bender
- (Germany) Jella Veit
- (Hungary) Adelina Molnár
- (Iceland) Margrét Gísladóttir
- (Iceland) Hrafnhildur Halldórsdóttir
- (Iceland) Vigdís Kristjánsdóttir
- (Iceland) Emelía Óskarsdóttir
- (Iceland) Katla Tryggvadóttir
- (Israel) Orian Biru
- (Israel) Zohar Gat
- (Italy) Veronica Bernardi
- (Kazakhstan) Anel Maksat
- (Kosovo) Eriola Delija
- (Lithuania) Meida Proscevičiūtė
- (Lithuania) Viltė Švarcaitė
- (Luxembourg) Rachel Kirps
- (Montenegro) Lidija Stanić
- (Netherlands) Djoeke De Ridder
- (Netherlands) Kealyn Thomas
- (Netherlands) Danique Tolhoek
- (North Macedonia) Mihaela Nastovska
- (North Macedonia) Biljana Paneska
- (North Macedonia) Vesa Sela
- (Northern Ireland) Mikayla Wildgoose
- (Norway) Cille Nilsen
- (Norway) Mawa Sesay
- (Poland) Emilia Szymczak
- (Portugal) Leonete Correia
- (Portugal) Ana Ferreira
- (Romania) Clara Roșu
- (Russia) Iana Svistunova
- (Scotland) Mia McAuley
- (Slovakia) Darina Hrúziková
- (Sweden) Victoria Svanström
- (Switzerland) Leela Egli
- (Ukraine) Valeriia Honcharuk
- (Ukraine) Myroslava Nevar

1 goal

- (Albania) Juarda Alijaj
- (Albania) Jehona Coka
- (Albania) Arlinda Kodra
- (Albania) Rosela Vasa
- (Armenia) Hasmik Grigoryan
- (Armenia) Milena Sayadyan
- (Austria) Magdalena Rukavina
- (Austria) Greta Spinn
- (Azerbaijan) Aydan Hasanova
- (Azerbaijan) Sumeyra Kesmez
- (Belarus) Anastasiya Maher
- (Belarus) Darya Mikhan
- (Belarus) Anastasiya Myslivets
- (Belgium) Emilie Bernard
- (Belgium) Véronique Zang Bikoula
- (Bosnia and Herzegovina) Edina Avdić
- (Bosnia and Herzegovina) Tasneem Dizdarević
- (Bosnia and Herzegovina) Janica Filipović
- (Bosnia and Herzegovina) Helena Gavrilović
- (Bulgaria) Polina Demirova
- (Bulgaria) Viktoria Genova
- (Croatia) Ena Čorak
- (Croatia) Helena Damjanović
- (Croatia) Tea Šaban
- (Croatia) Ana Višnjić
- (Croatia) Laura Vlastelica
- (Croatia) Tea Vračević
- (Czech Republic) Natálie Kostohryzová
- (Czech Republic) Kateřina Vithová
- (Denmark) Clara Bødtcher-Jensen
- (Denmark) Ida Marie Schmidt Jørgensen
- (England) Brooke Aspin
- (England) Ava Baker
- (England) Keira Barry
- (England) Jemima Dahou
- (England) Madison Earl
- (England) Virginia Lackey
- (England) Evie Rabjohn
- (Estonia) Carola Erik
- (Estonia) Kaili Lilles
- (Estonia) Jane Mirjam
- (Estonia) Karola Purgats
- (Estonia) Mia-Lisette Sarapik
- (Estonia) Bianka Uhtjärv
- (Estonia) Kätrin Välba
- (Estonia) Jaanika Volkov
- (Faroe Islands) Fríða Magnusardóttir Jakobsen
- (Finland) Jutta Angeria
- (Finland) Lilli Halttunen
- (Finland) Ida Heikkinen
- (Finland) Lotta Kalske
- (Finland) Milja Kiviranta
- (Finland) Elli Mäkipelkola
- (Finland) Julia Schalin
- (Finland) Ilona Walta
- (France) Lola Boisset
- (France) Tara Elimbi Gilbert
- (France) Lola Gstalter
- (France) Melina Mendy
- (France) Juliette Mossard
- (Georgia (country)) Tinatin Ambalia
- (Georgia (country)) Nino Bukhrikidze
- (Germany) Mara Alber
- (Germany) Annaleen Böhler
- (Germany) Mathilde Janzen
- (Germany) Lily Reimoller
- (Germany) Mia Werner
- (Greece) Maria Karipidis
- (Greece) Nicole Lazarakis
- (Hungary) Zsófia Mayer
- (Iceland) Eyrún Hjartardóttir
- (Iceland) Elísa Sigurjónsdóttir
- (Iceland) Ísabella Tryggvadóttir
- (Israel) Sapir Elbaz
- (Israel) Alemken Fenta
- (Israel) Shira Peretz
- (Israel) Michaelit Workou
- (Italy) Giorgia Berveglieri
- (Italy) Angela Congia
- (Italy) Alessia Marchetti
- (Italy) Ginevra Moretti
- (Italy) Monica Renzotti
- (Italy) Eva Schatzer
- (Kazakhstan) Nursulu Balzhan
- (Kazakhstan) Alina Lozukova
- (Kazakhstan) Kazyna Norbayeva
- (Kazakhstan) Margarita Taldykina
- (Kosovo) Bardha Gjonbalaj
- (Kosovo) Antigone Shabani
- (Latvia) Monta Ščuka
- (Lithuania) Agnieška Kazarina
- (Luxembourg) Joana Barbosa Trigo
- (Luxembourg) Lena Alves
- (Montenegro) Lejla Bambur
- (Montenegro) Katarina Čađenović
- (Montenegro) Larisa Đurković
- (Montenegro) Ana Krivokapić
- (Montenegro) Tanja Malesija
- (North Macedonia) Slagjana Gjorgjieva
- (North Macedonia) Anastasia Ilievska
- (North Macedonia) Jovana Pavlovska
- (Northern Ireland) Sophie Gargan
- (Northern Ireland) Aimee Kerr
- (Northern Ireland) Rachel McIntyre
- (Northern Ireland) Naomi Mclaughlin
- (Northern Ireland) Emily Reid
- (Northern Ireland) Sarah Tweedie
- (Norway) Ingrid Rame
- (Norway) Amalie Taraldsen
- (Poland) Oliwia Bałdyga
- (Poland) Zuzanna Grzywińska
- (Poland) Amelia Kowalczyk
- (Poland) Maja Kuleczka
- (Poland) Julia Piętakiewicz
- (Poland) Natalia Rohn
- (Portugal) Maria Ferreira
- (Portugal) Marta Gago
- (Portugal) Mafaldo Mariano
- (Portugal) Cristiana Martins
- (Portugal) Marta Melão
- (Portugal) Rita Pinto de Almeida
- (Republic of Ireland) Michaela Lawrence
- (Republic of Ireland) Ellie Long
- (Republic of Ireland) Jodie Loughrey
- (Republic of Ireland) Lia O'Leary
- (Republic of Ireland) Orlaith O'Mahony
- (Republic of Ireland) Joy Ralph
- (Romania) Denysa Pinzariu
- (Scotland) Mya Bates
- (Scotland) Tiree Burchill
- (Scotland) Georgia Gray
- (Scotland) Kayla Jardine
- (Scotland) Rosie Livingstone
- (Scotland) Rebecca Taylor
- (Scotland) Emma Watson
- (Serbia) Anja Jestrović
- (Serbia) Monja Josić
- (Serbia) Milica Stojić
- (Serbia) Milica Vesić
- (Slovakia) Zuzana Nárožná
- (Slovakia) Nikola Pajunková
- (Slovenia) Tija Karic
- (Slovenia) Katjusa Kern
- (Slovenia) Zara Kramzar
- (Slovenia) Masa Osojnik
- (Slovenia) Noelle Vilčnik
- (Spain) Jone Amezaga
- (Spain) Olaya Enrique
- (Spain) Raquel Íñigo
- (Spain) Cristina Librán
- (Spain) Victoria López
- (Spain) Laia Martret
- (Spain) Judit Pujols
- (Sweden) Maja Alvin
- (Sweden) Erica Persson Welin
- (Sweden) Petronella Winblad
- (Switzerland) Eriona Elezi
- (Switzerland) Monika Ibishaj
- (Switzerland) Mia Knapp
- (Switzerland) Mara Tauriello
- (Turkey) Zelal Boran
- (Turkey) Pınarsu Cılız
- (Turkey) Irem Ekiz
- (Turkey) Julia Oğuz
- (Turkey) Yaren Sürül
- (Ukraine) Diliara Bondarieva
- (Ukraine) Veronika Borkovska
- (Ukraine) Bozhena Dub
- (Ukraine) Anastasiia Kiselevych
- (Ukraine) Maryna Ptytsyna
- (Ukraine) Viktoriia Radionova
- (Ukraine) Viktoriia Skotsyk

1 own goal

- (France) Alice Marques (against Poland)
- (Kazakhstan) Anelya Mamyrova (against Lithuania)
- (Kazakhstan) Assel Orynbay (against Lithuania)
- (Kazakhstan) Margarita Taldykina (against Lithuania)
- (North Macedonia) Jovana Pavlovska (against Scotland)
- (Montenegro) Anastasija Bulić (against Italy)
- (Republic of Ireland) Kate Thompson (against Finland)

Source: UEFA.com
