= 2022 UEFA Women's Under-17 Championship squads =

Football tournament squads

The following is a list of squads for each national team competing at the 2022 UEFA Women's Under-17 Championship in Bosnia and Herzegovina. Each national team had to submit a squad of 20 players born on or after 1 January 2005.

== Group A ==
=== Denmark ===
The Danish squad was announced on 28 April 2022.

Head coach: Claus Struck

No.	Pos.	Player	Date of birth (age)	Caps	Goals	Club
1	GK	Camilla Bech Bonde	20 February 2005 (aged 17)	5	0	(Danish Football Association) AGF
2	DF	Celine Kampmann	8 March 2005 (aged 17)	2	0	(Danish Football Association) Odense Q
3	DF	Ida Marie Jǿrgensen	3 March 2005 (aged 17)	11	1	(Danish Football Association) Kolding IF
4	DF	Meryem Baskaya	14 July 2005 (aged 16)	8	0	(Danish Football Association) Brøndby IF
5	DF	Laura Kjærsgård	17 February 2005 (aged 17)	10	0	(Danish Football Association) AGF
6	MF	Caroline Nicolaisen	23 June 2005 (aged 16)	6	0	(Danish Football Association) Odense Q
7	MF	Josefine Valvik	24 June 2006 (aged 15)	8	0	(Danish Football Association) Fortuna Hjørring
8	MF	Pernille Sanvig	26 November 2005 (aged 16)	11	1	(Danish Football Association) Kolding IF
9	FW	Emilía Ásgeirsdóttir (captain)	31 January 2005 (aged 17)	11	8	(Danish Football Association) FC Nordsjælland
10	MF	Jóhanna Sørensen	28 November 2005 (aged 16)	11	3	(Danish Football Association) FC Nordsjælland
11	DF	Frida Nautrup	23 May 2006 (aged 15)	3	0	(Danish Football Association) FC Thy-Thisted Q
12	DF	Kamma Meldgaard	17 May 2005 (aged 16)	8	0	(Danish Football Association) SIF Q
13	DF	Mille Larsen	6 September 2005 (aged 16)	2	0	(Danish Football Association) Odense Q
14	MF	Karoline Olesen	3 February 2005 (aged 17)	5	0	(Danish Football Association) Fortuna Hjørring
15	FW	Clara La Cour	28 January 2005 (aged 17)	11	3	(Danish Football Association) FC Nordsjælland
16	GK	Liva Petersson	22 June 2005 (aged 16)	1	0	(Danish Football Association) FC Thy-Thisted Q
17	MF	Maja Hagemann	7 October 2005 (aged 16)	9	1	(Danish Football Association) Fortuna Hjørring
18	FW	Elvira Nejmann	19 February 2006 (aged 16)	9	0	(Danish Football Association) AGF
19	FW	Elisabeth Nielsen	6 January 2005 (aged 17)	8	0	(Danish Football Association) Odense Q
20	MF	Alma Aagaard	29 January 2006 (aged 16)	4	2	(Danish Football Association) FC Nordsjælland

=== Germany ===
The German squad was announced on 23 April 2022.

Head coach: Friederike Kromp

No.	Pos.	Player	Date of birth (age)	Club
1	GK	Eve Böttcher	25 January 2005 (aged 17)	(German Football Association) RB Leipzig
2	MF	Annaleen Böhler	18 July 2005 (aged 16)	(German Football Association) Bayern Munich
3	FW	Laura Gloning	5 June 2005 (aged 16)	(German Football Association) Bayern Munich
4	MF	Lily Reimöller	6 May 2005 (aged 16)	(German Football Association) SGS Essen
5	DF	Jella Veit	3 May 2005 (aged 17)	(German Football Association) Eintracht Frankfurt
6	MF	Mathilde Janzen	14 February 2005 (aged 17)	(German Football Association) TSG Hoffenheim
7	MF	Mara Alber	6 September 2005 (aged 16)	(German Football Association) TSG Hoffenheim
8	MF	Paulina Platner	16 November 2005 (aged 16)	(German Football Association) Eintracht Frankfurt
9	FW	Marie Steiner	4 September 2005 (aged 16)	(German Football Association) TSG Hoffenheim
10	MF	Alara Şehitler	27 November 2006 (aged 15)	(German Football Association) FV Ravensburg
11	FW	Loreen Bender	21 August 2005 (aged 16)	(German Football Association) Eintracht Frankfurt
12	GK	Lina Altenburg	23 March 2005 (aged 17)	(German Football Association) Eintracht Frankfurt
13	DF	Sandra Walbeck	5 March 2005 (aged 17)	(German Football Association) TSV Meerbusch
14	DF	Emily Wallrabenstein	9 September 2006 (aged 15)	(German Football Association) Hamburger SV
15	DF	Antonia Dehm	19 September 2005 (aged 16)	(German Football Association) TSV 1861 Nördlingen
16	MF	Lilith Schmidt	8 June 2006 (aged 15)	(German Football Association) SC 13 Bad Neuenahr
17	MF	Paulina Bartz	9 May 2005 (aged 16)	(German Football Association) Hamburger SV
18	DF	Svea Stoldt	3 December 2005 (aged 16)	(German Football Association) Hamburger SV
19	MF	Tessa Blumenberg	19 January 2005 (aged 17)	(German Football Association) VfL Wolfsburg
20	MF	Melina Krüger	5 January 2006 (aged 16)	(German Football Association) Magdeburger FFC

=== Netherlands ===
The Dutch squad was announced on 18 April 2022.

Head coach: Thomas Oostendorp

No.	Pos.	Player	Date of birth (age)	Club
1	GK	Femke Liefting	January 2, 2005 (aged 17)	(Royal Dutch Football Association) VV Alkmaar
2	DF	Daliyah de Klonia	March 18, 2005 (aged 17)	(Royal Dutch Football Association) AFC Ajax
3	DF	Djoeke de Ridder	August 21, 2005 (aged 16)	(Royal Dutch Football Association) AFC Ajax
4	DF	Isa Kardinaal	March 31, 2005 (aged 17)	(Royal Dutch Football Association) AFC Ajax
5	DF	Emma Frijns	February 25, 2005 (aged 17)	(Royal Dutch Football Association) PSV
6	MF	Quinty Dupon	July 22, 2005 (aged 16)	(Royal Dutch Football Association) ADO Den Haag
7	FW	Fieke Kroese	February 7, 2005 (aged 17)	(Royal Dutch Football Association) FC Twente
8	MF	Kealyn Thomas	July 27, 2005 (aged 16)	(Royal Dutch Football Association) PSV
9	FW	Hanna Huizenga	July 4, 2005 (aged 16)	(Royal Dutch Football Association) SC Heerenveen
10	MF	Sterre Kroezen	June 29, 2005 (aged 16)	(Royal Dutch Football Association) FC Twente
11	FW	Danique Tolhoek	March 17, 2005 (aged 17)	(Royal Dutch Football Association) AFC Ajax
12	DF	Melissa Schilder	September 16, 2005 (aged 16)	(Royal Dutch Football Association) PEC Zwolle
13	DF	Maud Rutgers	August 24, 2005 (aged 16)	(Royal Dutch Football Association) Be Quick 1887
14	DF	Veerle Buurman	April 21, 2006 (aged 16)	(Royal Dutch Football Association) SC Bemmel
15	MF	Lisa Stengs	August 17, 2005 (aged 16)	(Royal Dutch Football Association) AFC Ajax
16	GK	Roos van Eijk	October 15, 2005 (aged 16)	(Royal Dutch Football Association) VV Alkmaar
17	MF	Robine Lacroix	June 2, 2005 (aged 16)	(Royal Dutch Football Association) PSV
18	MF	Ilse Kemper	June 20, 2006 (aged 15)	(Royal Dutch Football Association) PEC Zwolle
19	FW	Lotte Keukelaar	September 25, 2005 (aged 16)	(Royal Dutch Football Association) AFC Ajax
20	FW	Aniek Janssen	January 16, 2006 (aged 16)	(Royal Dutch Football Association) RKHVV

== Group B ==
=== Finland ===
Finland named their squad on 22 April 2022.

Head coach: Marko Saloranta

No.	Pos.	Player	Date of birth (age)	Club
1	GK	Ellan Arpiainen	31 March 2005 (aged 17)	(Football Association of Finland) HFA
14	DF	Sara Arimo	31 May 2005 (aged 16)	(Football Association of Finland) FC Honka
12	GK	Siiri Forsström	6 May 2005 (aged 16)	(Football Association of Finland) Puotinkylän Valtti
4	DF	Aura Nyholm	21 March 2005 (aged 17)	(Football Association of Finland) Helsingin Palloseura
3	DF	Siiri Siivonen	21 December 2005 (aged 16)	(Football Association of Finland) Helsingin Jalkapalloklubi
2	DF	Helmi Perkaus	21 June 2005 (aged 16)	(Football Association of Finland) Ilves FS
20	DF	Ida Heikkinen	13 October 2006 (aged 15)	(Football Association of Finland) FC Honka
5	MF	Nelli Kalske	7 December 2005 (aged 16)	(Football Association of Finland) Espoon Palloseura
16	MF	Helmi Raijas	11 May 2005 (aged 16)	(Football Association of Finland) HFA
6	MF	Bettina Aho	13 March 2006 (aged 16)	(Football Association of Finland) FC Tin Drum
10	MF	Ilona Walta	5 January 2006 (aged 16)	(Football Association of Finland) Helsingin Jalkapalloklubi
7	MF	Julia Schalin	31 August 2005 (aged 16)	(Football Association of Finland) FC Honka
8	DF	Jutta Angeria	2 January 2005 (aged 17)	(Football Association of Finland) HFA
17	MF	Elli Mäkipelkola	24 May 2005 (aged 16)	(Football Association of Finland) Ilves FS
15	MF	Milja Kiviranta	15 May 2006 (aged 15)	(Football Association of Finland) Helsingin Jalkapalloklubi
9	FW	Elli Seiro	17 May 2005 (aged 16)	(Football Association of Finland) FC Honka
19	FW	Lilli Halttunen	1 July 2005 (aged 16)	(Football Association of Finland) Helsingin Jalkapalloklubi
18	MF	Lotta Kalske	7 December 2005 (aged 16)	(Football Association of Finland) Espoon Palloseura
13	FW	Sofia Jahnukainen	12 November 2006 (aged 15)	(Football Association of Finland) Pallokerho Keski-Uusimaa
11	FW	Amelia Luotonen	13 January 2005 (aged 17)	(Football Association of Finland) Musan Salama

=== France ===
France named their squad on 19 April 2022.

Head coach: Cécile Locatelli

No.	Pos.	Player	Date of birth (age)	Club
1	GK	Féérine Belhadj	14 February 2005 (aged 17)	(French Football Federation) Olympique Lyon
16	GK	Lisa Lebrun	24 June 2005 (aged 16)	(French Football Federation) FC Nantes
3	DF	Louna Belhout Achi	11 January 2005 (aged 17)	(French Football Federation) Olympique Lyon
4	DF	Lola Boisset	20 July 2005 (aged 16)	(French Football Federation) FC Nantes
15	DF	Jeanne Dumets	9 January 2005 (aged 17)	(French Football Federation) Le Havre
12	DF	Tara Elimbi Gilbert	9 June 2005 (aged 16)	(French Football Federation) Paris Saint-Germain
18	DF	Agathe Felden	21 September 2005 (aged 16)	(French Football Federation) FCE Merignac Arlac
2	DF	Taeryne Job	10 July 2006 (aged 15)	(French Football Federation) Saint-Étienne
5	DF	Alice Marques	4 May 2005 (aged 16)	(French Football Federation) Olympique Lyon
7	MF	Inès Belmiliani	17 October 2005 (aged 16)	(French Football Federation) Saint-Étienne
8	MF	Charline Coutel	12 June 2006 (aged 15)	(French Football Federation) Sedan Ardennes
13	MF	Lola Gstalter	13 July 2005 (aged 16)	(French Football Federation) Montpellier
17	MF	Juliette Mossard	9 July 2005 (aged 16)	(French Football Federation) FC Nantes
11	MF	Laureen Oillic	3 May 2005 (aged 17)	(French Football Federation) FC Nantes
6	MF	Wassilah Pacaud	22 September 2005 (aged 16)	(French Football Federation) EA Guingamp
20	MF	Fanny Rossi	8 November 2005 (aged 16)	(French Football Federation) Paris Saint-Germain
9	FW	Lucie Calba	24 February 2005 (aged 17)	(French Football Federation) FC Metz
10	FW	Shana Chossenotte	14 February 2005 (aged 17)	(French Football Federation) Stade de Reims
19	FW	Mélinda Mendy	21 December 2006 (aged 15)	(French Football Federation) Le Havre
14	FW	Imane Touriss	11 February 2005 (aged 17)	(French Football Federation) CPB Brequigny Rennes

=== Norway ===
Head coach:

No.	Pos.	Player	Date of birth (age)	Club
1	GK	Maria Sandvik	14 January 2005 (aged 17)	(Norwegian Football Federation) Viking FK
2	DF	Mia Hambro Svendsen	27 July 2005 (aged 16)	(Norwegian Football Federation) Røa IL
3	DF	Mathilde Eidissen Karlsen	11 January 2005 (aged 17)	(Norwegian Football Federation) Medkila IL
4	DF	Tilja Ellingsen	13 May 2005 (aged 16)	(Norwegian Football Federation) Klepp IL
5	DF	Anna Lervik	24 June 2005 (aged 16)	(Norwegian Football Federation) AaFK Fortuna
6	MF	Vilde H. Grøseth	12 March 2005 (aged 17)	(Norwegian Football Federation) Rosenborg BK
7	MF	Sarah Martinussen	17 March 2005 (aged 17)	(Norwegian Football Federation) Medkila IL
8	MF	Signe Gaupset	18 June 2005 (aged 16)	(Norwegian Football Federation) SK Brann
9	FW	Mawa Sesay	15 April 2005 (aged 17)	(Norwegian Football Federation) Strømsgodset IF
10	MF	Cille Nilsen	7 January 2006 (aged 16)	(Norwegian Football Federation) Avaldsnes IL
11	MF	Kamilla Melgård	16 December 2005 (aged 16)	(Norwegian Football Federation) Lyn Fotball
12	GK	Pia Grinde Hansen	12 February 2006 (aged 16)	(Norwegian Football Federation) Øvrevoll Hosle IL
13	DF	Ingrid Rame	31 May 2005 (aged 16)	(Norwegian Football Federation) Klepp IL
14	DF	Madelen Eid	31 March 2005 (aged 17)	(Norwegian Football Federation) AaFK Fortuna
15	MF	Amalie Isabell Taraldsen	16 August 2005 (aged 16)	(Norwegian Football Federation) Røa IL
16	MF	Tuva Henriksen	17 September 2005 (aged 16)	(Norwegian Football Federation) Lyn Fotball
17	MF	Ida Mortensen Natvik	15 November 2005 (aged 16)	(Norwegian Football Federation) Avaldsnes IL
18	MF	Ragnhild Eikeland Skage	4 January 2005 (aged 17)	(Norwegian Football Federation) FK Fyllingsdalen
19	FW	Mina Bell Folland	3 August 2005 (aged 16)	(Norwegian Football Federation) Arna-Bjørnar
20	FW	Linneah Rene Henriquez Rasmussen	15 August 2005 (aged 16)	(Norwegian Football Federation) FK Haugesund

=== Spain ===
Spain named their squad on 20 April 2022.

Head coach: Kenio Gonzalo

No.	Pos.	Player	Date of birth (age)	Club
1	GK	Sofía Fuente	14 March 2005 (aged 17)	(Royal Spanish Football Federation) Real Madrid
2	DF	Judit Pujols	25 February 2005 (aged 17)	(Royal Spanish Football Federation) FC Barcelona
3	DF	Yolanda Sierra	17 January 2005 (aged 17)	(Royal Spanish Football Federation) Atlético Madrid
4	DF	Adriana Ranera	7 July 2005 (aged 16)	(Royal Spanish Football Federation) FC Barcelona
5	MF	Sandra Villafañe	18 September 2005 (aged 16)	(Royal Spanish Football Federation) Madrid CFF
6	MF	Marina Artero	14 October 2005 (aged 16)	(Royal Spanish Football Federation) Athletic Club
7	FW	Lucía Corrales	24 November 2005 (aged 16)	(Royal Spanish Football Federation) FC Barcelona
8	MF	Olaya Enrique	10 May 2005 (aged 16)	(Royal Spanish Football Federation) Sporting de Gijón
9	FW	Carla Camacho	2 May 2005 (aged 17)	(Royal Spanish Football Federation) Real Madrid
10	MF	Vicky López	26 July 2006 (aged 15)	(Royal Spanish Football Federation) Madrid CFF
11	FW	Jone Amezaga	2 January 2005 (aged 17)	(Royal Spanish Football Federation) Athletic Club
12	FW	Magalí Capdevila	21 June 2005 (aged 16)	(Royal Spanish Football Federation) FC Barcelona
14	MF	Nina Pou	31 October 2005 (aged 16)	(Royal Spanish Football Federation) FC Barcelona
15	DF	Sara Ortega	20 February 2005 (aged 17)	(Royal Spanish Football Federation) Athletic Club
16	MF	Raquel Íñigo	27 June 2006 (aged 15)	(Royal Spanish Football Federation) Real Madrid
17	MF	Marina Rivas	2 July 2005 (aged 16)	(Royal Spanish Football Federation) Real Betis
18	DF	Naara Miranda	11 November 2004 (aged 17)	(Royal Spanish Football Federation) Racing Féminas
19	FW	Laia Martret	28 August 2005 (aged 16)	(Royal Spanish Football Federation) FC Barcelona
20	FW	Paula Partido	2 March 2005 (aged 17)	(Royal Spanish Football Federation) Real Madrid
23	GK	Eunate Astralaga	30 November 2005 (aged 16)	(Royal Spanish Football Federation) Athletic Club
