= Sandnes Idrettspark =

Multi-use sports venue in Sandnes, Norway

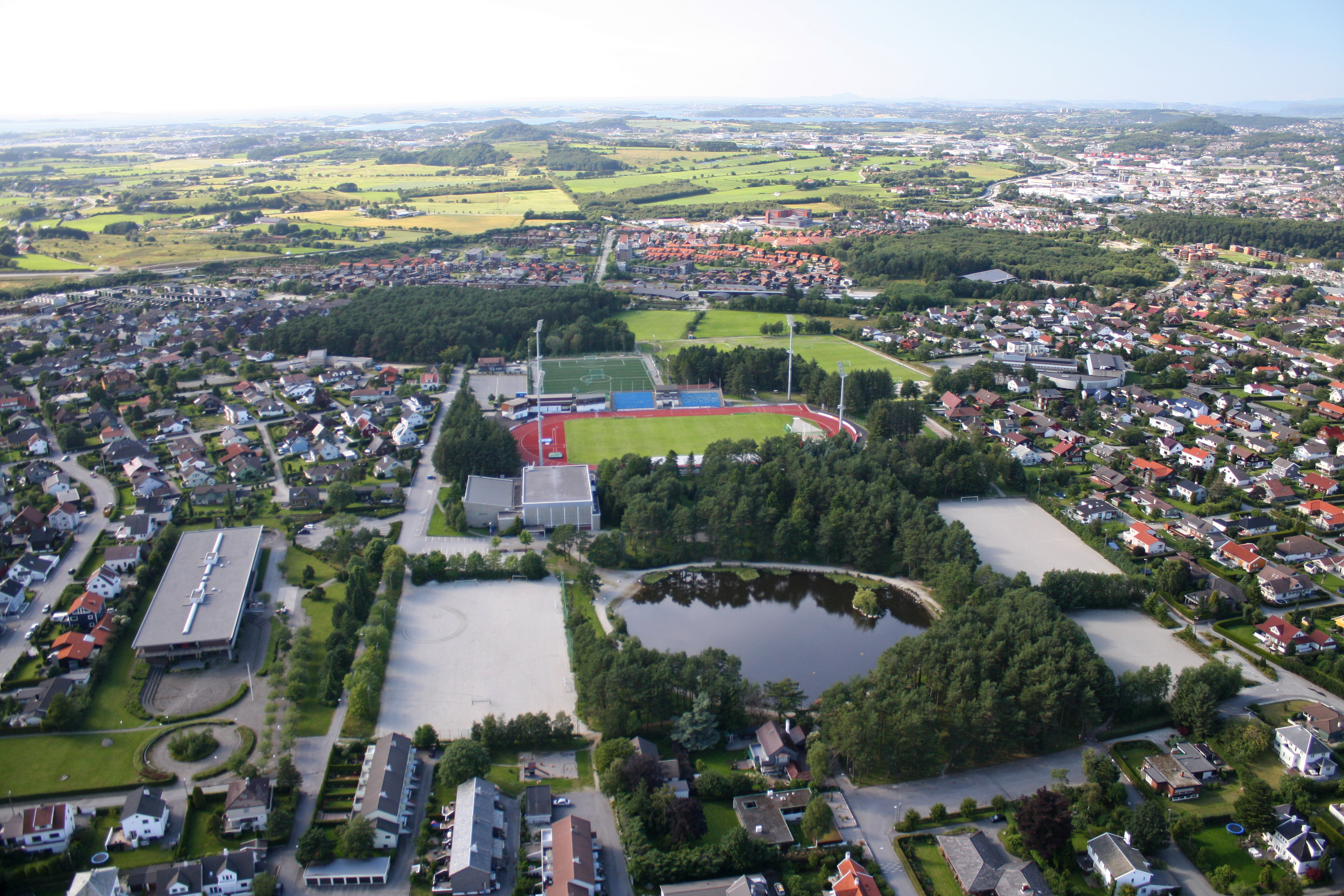
- The Sports park in 2010
- Interactive map of Sandnes Idrettspark
- Location: Sandnes, Norway
- Coordinates: 58°51′37″N 5°43′33″E
- Owner: The municipality of Sandnes

Sandnes Idrettspark is a multi-purpose sports parks located in Sandnes, Rogaland, Norway. It includes the Sandnes Stadion, Giskebanen, two artificial football pitches, basketball courts, tennis courts, a gymnasium track and the Øster Hus Arena.

== History ==
=== Sandnes Stadion ===
An athletics venue and former football ground. At the start of the 2020 season, Sandnes Ulf moved to the newly built Øster Hus Arena, which is located next to Sandnes Stadion.

=== Øster Hus Arena ===
A football stadium that opened in 2020.

=== Giskebanen ===
The Idrettspark was the venue for motorcycle speedway. It held the Norwegian Individual Speedway Championship in 1951 and 1967 and 1971, in addition to international test matches. Some listings state the speedway took place at the Sandnes Stadion but it is known that the 1971 final was held around the adjacent Giskebanen.
