= Zoè Werner =

German footballer (born 2005)

Zoé Werner
Personal information
- Full name: Zoé Werner
- Date of birth: 5 August 2005 (age 21)
- Place of birth: Zwickau, Germany
- Height: 1.66 m (5 ft 5 in)
- Position: Midfielder

Team information
- Current team: RB Leipzig II
- Number: 19

Senior career*
Years	Team	Apps	(Gls)
2021–	RB Leipzig II		
2022–2024	RB Leipzig	14	(2)
- * Club domestic league appearances and goals as of 08:57, 9 October 2026 (UTC)

Zoé Werner (born 5 August 2005) is a German professional footballer who plays as a midfielder for Frauen-Regionalliga Nordost club RB Leipzig II.

== Personal life ==
Zoe Werner also has a twin sister Mia Werner who is also a professional footballer.

== Honours ==
RB Leipzig

- 2. Frauen-Bundesliga: 2022–23
