= Sandnes Ulf =

Norwegian football club

- Full name: Sandnes Ulf
- Nicknames: Ulf; Ulvane (The Wolves); Di lyseblå (The Light Blues)
- Founded: 1 June 1911; 115 years ago; as SK Ulf; 1987; as Ulf-Sandnes; February 2004; as Sandnes Ulf
- Ground: Øster Hus Arena, Sandnes
- Capacity: 6,046
- Chairman: Stig Ravndal
- Head coach: Arturo Cleveland
- League: 1. divisjon
- 2026: 1. divisjon, 12th of 16
- Website: www.sandnesulf.no
Home colours	Away colours

Sandnes Ulf is a Norwegian association football club from Sandnes, Rogaland, currently playing in the 1. divisjon, the second highest division in the Norwegian football league system. The club play their home matches at Øster Hus Arena. The club was founded on 1 June 1911 as SK Ulf, and today has over 80 registered teams, making it the largest football club in Rogaland.

Sandnes Ulf play in light blue jerseys, white shorts and light blue socks. Sandnes Ulf is an open member association and the annual general meeting is the highest policy-making body. The meeting approves the accounts and elects the chairman and board. Stig Ravndal is the current chairman, elected in 2012. Daily operations are run by a managing director who liaises with the chairman.

Sandnes Ulf's official fan club is known as Gaukereiret ("The Cuckoo's Nest"), reflecting on the nickname for people from Sandnes; Sandnes-cuckoos.

== History ==
The sport of football came directly to Sandnes from its home country, England, when two British brothers Arnold and Hubert Thomas moved to the town in 1907. It did not take long before Sandnes' first football club was established, Sandnes Fodboldforening, but the club was dissolved a few years later when the two brothers moved back to England. The interest and love for football, however, had found its place in Sandnes, and in the summer of 1911 the new football club, Sportsklubben Ulf, was founded.

Nils Voss, a 1912 Olympic gold-medal winner in gymnastics, became the club's first President. In its inaugural year the club had a turnover of 88 Norwegian krones and 84 øre (approximately 14 US$). In 1916 the club's board decided to introduce a new uniform, choosing the light blue jersey and white shorts we see today.

In 1919 the club was promoted to class A in Landsdelsserien, which at the time was the highest level. In June 1927 the club opened Sandnes stadion, the arena where the club played until 2020, when they moved about 100 meters to Øster Hus Arena.

The 1930s was a successful decade for the club with top-3 positions six consecutive seasons, and qualifying for the newly established top division Norgesserien in 1937. The club played at this level until 1940 when the season was cancelled due to World War II. When the league started again in 1947 the club failed to qualify.

SK Ulf had spells on the second highest level during the 1950s, 60s and 70s, but have mostly been playing at level three or four in the 80s and 90s.

In 1997 the 11 football clubs of Sandnes founded Sandnes FK in an attempt to form a potential top club. The project however only succeeded partly, with a couple of seasons in Second Division. In 2003 Sandnes FK was on the verge of bankruptcy when they won their Third Division group, whereas Ulf-Sandnes was relegated to Fourth Division. This increased the keenness of both parts to cooperate, and during the winter of 2003–04 Sandnes FK incorporated into Ulf, with Ulf thus changing its name to Sandnes Ulf.

With Asle Andersen arriving at the club in 2006 as a player-manager he revitalised and professionalised the club and immediately brought on-field success. In 2007, Sandnes Ulf won promotion to Adeccoligaen (2008 1. divisjon), the second highest division in the Norwegian football league system. They won their 2. divisjon group three points ahead of Stavanger IF. This sparked renewed interest in the club, with increased press coverage and attendances at Sandnes stadion.

Prior to the 2008 season, the signings of Paul Oyuga and Artur Kotenko brought even more experience from professional football to the club. They were relegated back to 2. divisjon in 2008, but recovered and returned to the 1. divisjon for the 2010 season.

The club finished the 2010 1. divisjon at a relegation spot once again. However, Follo FK, a team which had managed to avoid relegation, was forced to withdraw from the league because of financial difficulties, and Sandnes Ulf kept its place in the division for the 2011 1. divisjon.

The 2011 season turned out to be very successful for the club: On 23 October 2011, one hundred years after its formation and one year after it was supposed to be relegated from the 1. divisjon, Sandnes Ulf gained promotion to the Norwegian top flight. Until that date, Sandnes had been the only city among the 10 largest cities in Norway which had not had a team in the top flight after World War Two.

== Stadium ==
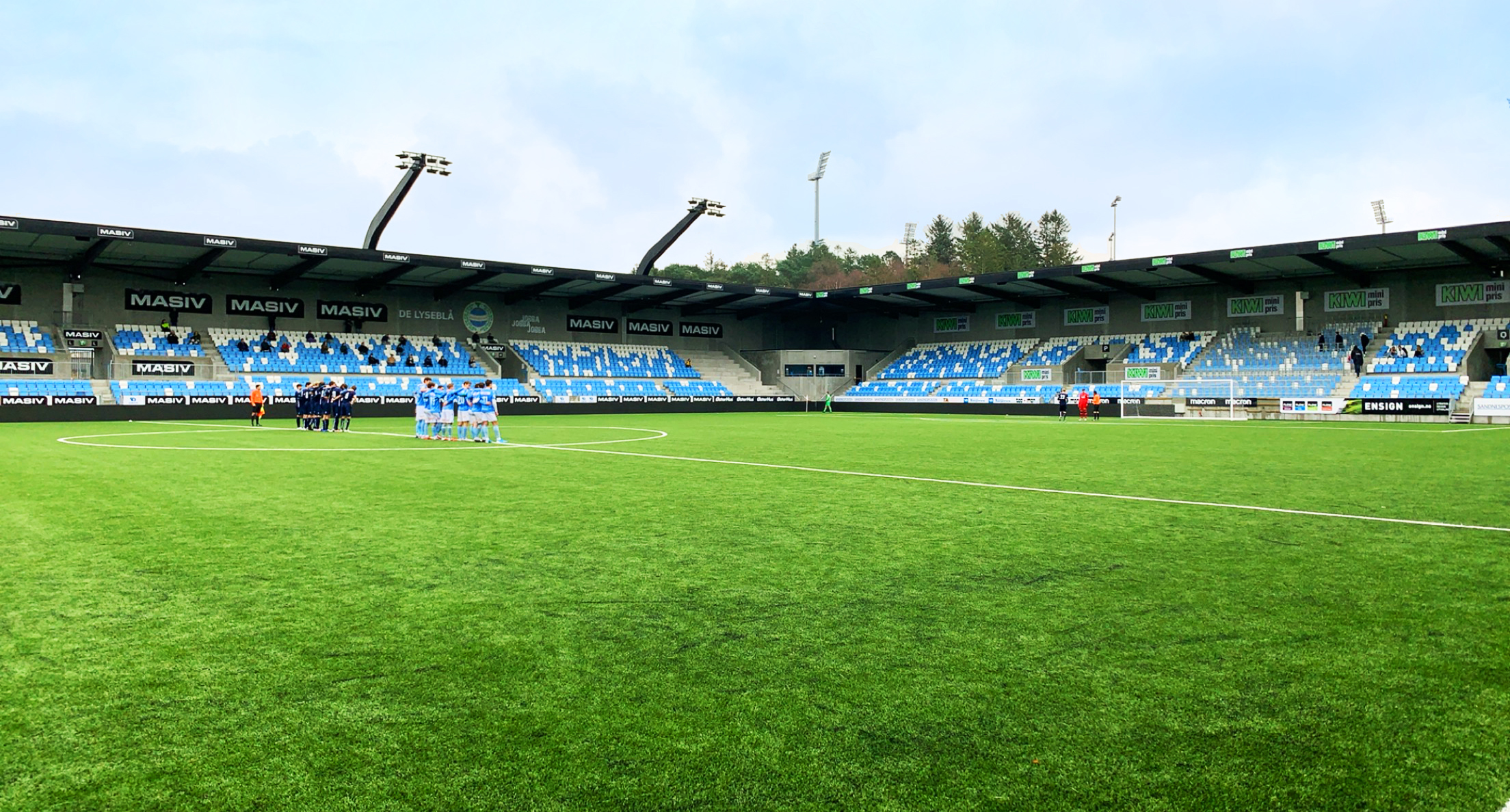
Øster Hus Arena

Sandnes Ulf are playing their home games at Øster Hus Arena, which is located next to their old stadium. The stadium is an all-seater with a capacity of 6,046 spectators.

== Recent history ==
("Ulf-Sandnes" until, and including, 2003)

Season		Pos.	Pl.	W	D	L	GS	GA	P	Cup	Notes
2001	2. divisjon	↓ 12	26	9	4	13	47	56	31	First round	Relegated to the 3. divisjon
2002	3. divisjon	6	22	10	3	9	42	40	33		
2003	3. divisjon	↑ 1	22	18	2	2	61	25	56	First round	Promoted to the 2. divisjon
2004	2. divisjon	8	26	10	4	12	38	47	34	Second round	
2005	2. divisjon	4	26	11	9	6	57	43	42	Second round	
2006	2. divisjon	2	26	15	7	4	50	32	52	First round	
2007	2. divisjon	↑ 1	26	17	4	5	66	30	55	First round	Promoted to the 1. divisjon
2008	1. divisjon	↓ 15	30	5	10	15	36	55	25	Third round	Relegated to the 2. divisjon
2009	2. divisjon	↑ 1	26	19	4	3	88	28	61	Second round	Promoted to the 1. divisjon
2010	1. divisjon	13	28	8	7	13	33	40	31	Third round	Escaped relegation due to the demotion of Follo FK for financial reasons
2011	1. divisjon	↑ 2	30	18	2	10	58	32	56	Third round	Promoted to the Tippeligaen
2012	Tippeligaen	14	30	8	8	14	44	56	32	First round	
2013	Tippeligaen	13	30	9	6	15	36	58	33	Second round	
2014	Tippeligaen	↓ 16	30	4	10	16	27	53	22	First round	Relegated to the 1. divisjon
2015	1. divisjon	7	30	13	8	9	49	40	47	Second round	
2016	1. divisjon	4	30	15	6	9	55	28	51	Fourth round	
2017	1. divisjon	5	30	14	9	7	44	39	51	Second round	
2018	1. divisjon	10	30	11	9	10	43	47	42	Third round	
2019	1. divisjon	9	30	11	5	14	46	49	38	Third round	
2020	1. divisjon	7	30	11	8	11	46	55	41	Cancelled	
2021	1. divisjon	8	30	10	9	11	43	49	39	Quarter-final	
2022	1. divisjon	5	30	14	5	11	54	52	47	Third round	
2023	1. divisjon	11	30	10	7	13	42	45	37	Second round	
2024	1. divisjon	↓ 16	30	4	5	21	26	80	17	Semi-final	Relegated to the 2. divisjon
2025	2. divisjon	↑ 1	26	16	6	4	72	30	54	First round	Promoted to the 1. divisjon
2026	1. divisjon	12	30	9	6	15	45	49	33	Third round	

== Current squad ==
As of 16 March 2026

Note: Flags indicate national team as defined under FIFA eligibility rules; some limited exceptions apply. Players may hold more than one non-FIFA nationality.

No.	Pos.	Nation	Player
1	GK	NOR	Aslak Falch
2	DF	NOR	Kevin Egell-Johnsen
3	DF	NOR	Fillip Botnen (on loan from Viking)
4	DF	NOR	Axel Kryger
5	DF	FRO	Gullbrandur Øregaard
6	MF	DEN	Aksel Jørgensen (on loan from Lyngby)
7	MF	FRO	Olaf Bárdarson
8	MF	NOR	Sander Saugestad
9	FW	NOR	Ole Sebastian Sundgot
10	MF	NOR	Kaloyan Kostadinov
11	FW	NOR	Mathias Sundberg
12	GK	NOR	Eivind Hagen
13	GK	NOR	Tord Flolid

No.	Pos.	Nation	Player
14	FW	NOR	Peder Brekke
15	MF	CGO	Zifarlino Nsoni
16	MF	NOR	Yann-Erik de Lanlay
17	DF	NOR	Andreas Rosendal Nyhagen
18	MF	NOR	Ådne Bruseth
19	DF	NOR	Kevin Pereira
20	FW	NOR	Jonas Brune Aune
22	MF	NOR	Daniel Arifagic
23	DF	NOR	Erik Berland
25	MF	NOR	Eliah Røksund Debes
28	DF	DEN	Malthe Henriksen (on loan from Lyngby)
32	FW	NOR	Nicholas Horn Ivesdal
77	FW	NOR	Ali Memed

== Managerial history ==
Manager	Period
Magne Hetland	1946
Ludvig Oppedal	1946–47
Reidar Kvammen/Reidar Berger d.e.	1948
Petter Strøm/Willy Nilsen	1949
Jens Opsal	1950
Finn Tøgaard	1951
Reidar Berger d.e./Magne Hetland/Odd Thorsvik	1952
Gunnar Stensland	1953
Odd Thorsvik/Jon Larsen	1954
Odd Thorsvik/Torgil Gunneng	1955
Odd Thorsvik	1956
Gunnar Stensland	1957–58
Odd Thorsvik	1959–65
Tor Kyllingstad & John Oftedal/Gaute Skrudland	1966
Otto Hermansen	1967
Anders Svela	1968–69
Odd Thorsvik	1970–71
Rolf Stangeland	1972
John Oftedal	1973–74
Roald Bergsaker	1975–76
Arvid Knutsen	1977–79

Manager	Period
Roald Bergsaker	1980
Clive Baker	1981–82
Marvid Skjæveland	1983
Trond Tengesdal	1984–85
Kjell Arne Håland & Johnny Gilje	1986–87
Inge Thulin	1988–90
Trond Tengesdal	1991
Tony Knapp	1992–93
Arild Ravndal	1994–95
Torjus Sivertsen	1996
No team due to Sandnes FK	1997
Kjell Erga	1998
Kåre Nygaard	1999–03
Øystein Tveit	2004–05
Asle Andersen & Johan Selvig	23 March, 2006–08
Asle Andersen	2009–2014
Tom Nordlie	2014
Bengt Sæternes	2014–2019
Steffen Landro	2020–2021
Bojan Zajic (interim)	2021
Bjarne Berntsen	2021–2023
Thomas Pereira	2023–2024
Steinar Nilsen (interim)	2024–present

== Literature ==
- Frank Bertelsen m. fl. (2011). 100 år med lyseblå kjærlighet; Sandnes Ulf 1911–2011. Dreyer Bok.
- Olav Kåre Nygaard & Lars Strusshamn (2001): Ulf-Sandnes gjennom 15 år, 1986–2001
- Odd Fladen, Petter Tjessheim & Lars Strusshamn (1986): Sportsklubben Ulf gjennom 75 år, 1911–1986
