= Ginevra Moretti =

Italian footballer (born 2005)

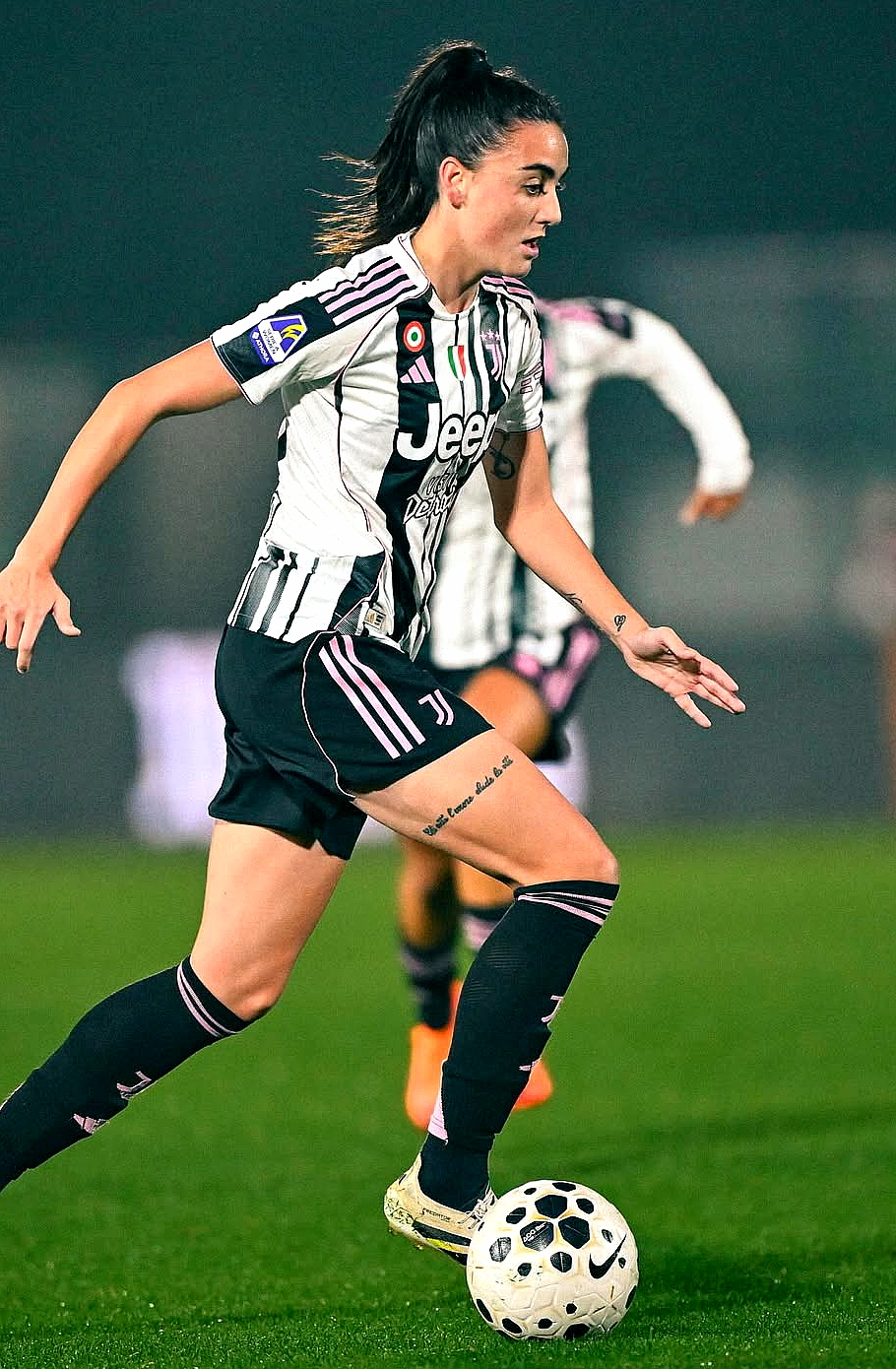
- Moretti with Juventus in 2025

Personal information
- Date of birth: 6 October 2005 (age 21)
- Place of birth: Pontremoli, Italy
- Height: 1.77 m (5 ft 10 in)
- Position: Forward

Team information
- Current team: Como on loan from Juventus
- Number: 16

Youth career
- 2011–2015: Magra Azzurri
- 2015–2020: Spezia
- 2020–2024: Juventus

Senior career*
Years	Team	Apps	(Gls)
2022–	Juventus	4	(0)
2024–2025	→ Napoli (loan)	24	(2)
2026–	→ Como (loan)	0	(0)

International career
2022	Italy U17	10	(3)
2022–2024	Italy U19	6	(0)
2024–	Italy U23	0	(0)
- * Club domestic league appearances and goals as of 20 September 2025

Ginevra Moretti (born 6 October 2005) is an Italian professional footballer who plays as a forward for Serie A club Como on loan from Juventus.

== Early life ==
Moretti grew up in a footballing family in Lunigiana and started playing at a young age, following her father into the sport.

== Club career ==
Moretti began her playing career at the age of six with Magra Azzurri's youth teams.

At the age of ten, Moretti joined the girls' section of Spezia and progressed through the club's youth ranks. In June 2019, she played for Spezia's under-15 team at the Città di Arenzano tournament, finishing as the competition's top scorer.

In the summer of 2020, aged 14, Moretti joined the Juventus youth system. Owing to her performances in attack, she was promoted to the club's Primavera squad at 15 for the 2020–21 season.

Over four seasons in the Juventus youth system, Moretti helped the club reach three consecutive Primavera championship finals. In 2023, she finished as the Primavera league's top scorer with 24 goals.

On 22 July 2024, Moretti joined Serie A club Napoli on a season-long loan.

After featuring regularly for Napoli during the 2024–25 season, her loan was initially extended for 2025–26, but was later cut short at Juventus's request, and she returned to the Turin club.

== International career ==
Moretti received her first call-up to the Italy under-17 national team in 2021 for the qualifiers for the 2022 UEFA Women's Under-17 Championship in Bosnia and Herzegovina. She made her debut in the opening match of the qualifying round, scoring Italy's second goal in a win against Wales.

She was retained in the Italy under-17 squad for a pair of friendlies against Estonia on 9 and 11 February 2022, scoring twice in the second match. She also played in the remaining UEFA qualifying fixtures, although Italy did not qualify for the final tournament.

== Honours ==
Juventus

- Coppa Italia: 2022–23
- Supercoppa Italiana: 2025

Individual

- Premio Scarabello: 2023 - Best Young Talent
