= Øster Hus Arena =

Football stadium in Sandnes, Norway

- Interactive map of Øster Hus Arena
- Location: Sandnes, Norway
- Coordinates: 58.8614°N 5.7210°E
- Owner: Sandnes Ulf
- Capacity: 6,046 (seated)
- Surface: Artificial turf

Construction
- Built: 2018–2020

Tenants
- Sandnes Ulf (2020–present); Norway national rugby league team (2023–present)

Øster Hus Arena is a football stadium located in Sandnes, Rogaland, Norway. It is a part of Sandnes Idrettspark and is used for football matches as the home ground of Sandnes Ulf. Øster Hus Arena was opened in the beginning of the 2020 season. The stadium's seated capacity is 6,046.

The stadium is located next to Sandnes Stadion, the former home ground of Sandnes Ulf.

== History ==
=== Planning ===
In 2007, the Norwegian Football Federation concluded that Sandnes Ulf had to either upgrade Sandnes Stadion or start projecting a new stadium to keep their elite license. In 2008, Sandnes Ulf and Sandnes municipality started the process of planning a new stadium. The construction of the stadium was estimated to cost NOK 147.6 million. Initially, the stadium was planned to be completed in time for the opening of the 2019 season, but the opening day was later postponed by one year. The stadium was planned as an all-seater with a capacity of 7,582 spectators, with possibilities for an increase to 10,000 spectators, but the number was later reduced.

=== Construction ===
Construction of the stadium commenced on 20 June 2018. It is projected to be completed in the first quarter of 2020.

=== Naming rights ===
On 10 November 2017, local Sandnes company Øster Hus announced that they had purchased the naming rights for the stadium the first ten years of its existence, in a deal worth NOK 12 million.
