= Mia Werner =

German footballer (born 2005)

Personal information
- Full name: Mia Werner
- Date of birth: 5 August 2005 (age 21)
- Place of birth: Zwickau, Germany
- Height: 1.68 m (5 ft 6 in)
- Position: Midfielder

Team information
- Current team: RB Leipzig II
- Number: 10

Senior career*
Years	Team	Apps	(Gls)
2021–	RB Leipzig II		
2022–2024	RB Leipzig	17	(1)

International career
2021	Germany U17	2	(1)
- * Club domestic league appearances and goals as of 08:58, 9 October 2026 (UTC)

Mia Werner (born 5 August 2005) is a German professional footballer who plays as a midfielder for Frauen-Regionalliga Nordost club RB Leipzig II.

== Personal life ==
Mia Werner also has a twin sister Zoè Werner who is also a professional footballer.

== Honours ==
RB Leipzig

- 2. Frauen-Bundesliga: 2022–23
