= Sara Stokić =

Serbian footballer (born 2005)

Personal information
- Date of birth: 31 May 2005 (age 21)
- Place of birth: Serbia
- Positions: Winger; forward

Team information
- Current team: AC Milan
- Number: 15

Senior career*
Years	Team	Apps	(Gls)
- Sloga Zemun
–2024	Vojvodina		
2024–	AC Milan	11	(1)

International career^{‡}
2021–2022	Serbia U17	6	(6)
2021–2022	Serbia U19	11	(5)
2024–	Serbia	7	(2)
- * Club domestic league appearances and goals as of 22 March 2025 ‡ National team caps and goals as of 3 March 2026

Sara Stokić (Serbian Cyrillic: Сара Стокић: born 31 May 2005) is a footballer who plays as a winger for AC Milan.

== Early life ==
Stokić was born on 31 May 2005 in Serbia. Growing up, she attended Dimitrije Davidović Elementary School, Tenth Belgrade High School and Jovan Jovanović Zmaj Gymnasium and is a native of Smederevo, Serbia.

== Club career ==
Stokić started her career with Serbian side Sloga Zemun. Subsequently, she signed for Serbian side Vojvodina. In 2024, she signed for Italian side AC Milan. On 9 September 2024, she debuted for the club during a 1–2 home loss to ACF Fiorentina in the league. Serbian website wrote in 2025 that she "has been attracting enormous public attention in recent months as one of our most successful footballers.. the first recipient of the newly established award of the Football Association of Serbia for the most promising player in 2024".

== International career ==
Stokić is a Serbia senior and youth international. During the summer of 2024, she played for the Serbia national under-19 team at the 2024 UEFA European Under-19 Championship.

== International goals ==
No.	Date	Venue	Opponent	Score	Result	Competition
1.	29 October 2024	Serbian FA Sports Center, Stara Pazova, Serbia	Bosnia and Herzegovina	1–0	4–1	UEFA Women's Euro 2025 qualifying play-offs
2.	3 March 2026	Forum Horsens Stadium, Horsens, Denmark	Denmark	1–2	1–3	2027 FIFA Women's World Cup qualification
