= Milja Kiviranta =

Finnish footballer, born 2006

Personal information
- Date of birth: 15 May 2006 (age 20)
- Position: Midfielder

Team information
- Current team: HJK
- Number: 27

Youth career
- –2019: Kotkan Jäntevä
- 2019–2023: HJK

Senior career*
Years	Team	Apps	(Gls)
2023–	HJK	80	(26)

International career^{‡}
2022–2023	Finland U17	20	(5)
2024	Finland U18	2	(1)
2023–2025	Finland U19	19	(5)
2025–	Finland U23	1	(0)
2025–	Finland	5	(0)
- * Club domestic league appearances and goals as of 23 November 2026 ‡ National team caps and goals as of 23 November 2026

Milja Kiviranta (Finnish: [ˈmiljɑ ˈkivirɑntɑ]; born 15 May 2006) is a Finnish footballer who plays as a midfielder for Kansallinen Liiga club HJK Helsinki and the Finland national team.

== Early life ==
Kiviranta was born on 15 May 2006. She grew up in Kotka and played youth football for Kotkan Jäntevä, before joining HJK Helsinki's academy in 2019.

== Club career ==
=== HJK Helsinki ===
Kiviranta joined Kansallinen Liiga club HJK Helsinki in the 2023 season. She was part of the squad that won the inaugural Kansallinen Cup title. She finished the season with 12 goals (six in the league, one in the Finnish Women's Cup and five in the league cup) in 29 appearances (20 in the league, four in the cup and five in the league cup).

Kiviranta spent a second season at the club in the 2024 season. She was awarded Player of the Month for June that year. She was part of the HJK squad that completed the domestic double, securing both their record 23rd league title and their record 18th cup title. She finished the season with nine goals (all in the league) in 25 appearances (21 in the league and four in the cup).

Kiviranta spent her third season at the club in the 2025 season. She scored the opening goal in the Finnish Cup final, which HJK won 3–1 over Åland United as part of their historic domestic treble, in which they became the first Finnish club (male or female) to win all three major trophies in a season after winning their second consecutive and record 24th overall league title, their record 19th cup title and their record second league cup title. She finished the season with seven goals (six in the league and one in the cup) in 29 appearances (20 in the league, four in the cup, three in the league cup and two in the UEFA Women's Champions League (UWCL)).

Kiviranta spent her fourth season at the club during the 2026 season. She scored the second goal for HJK in their 3–1 victory over cross-city rivals HPS Helsinki in the Finnish Cup final, her second goal in a cup final for the club. That season, HJK won another double, winning their third consecutive and record 25th overall league title and their record 20th cup. She finished the season with nine goals (five in the league, one in the cup, two in the league cup and one in the Champions League) in 30 appearances (19 in the league, two in the cup, five in the league cup, two in the Champions League and two in the UEFA Women's Europa Cup (UWEC)).

== International career ==
Kiviranta has represented Finland at under-17, under-18, under-19, under-23 and senior levels.

Kiviranta was part of Finland's 20-player squad for the 2022 UEFA Women's Under-17 Championship in Bosnia and Herzegovina from 3 to 15 May.

Kiviranta made her début for the Finland senior national team on 25 October 2025, coming on as a substitute for Ria Öling in the 62nd minute of a 6–1 home loss to Denmark in the first leg of a promotion/relegation playoff at Tammelan Stadion in Tampere.

== Statistics ==
As of 23 November 2026

=== Club ===
Appearances and goals by club, season and competition
Club	Season	League			National cup (Note: Includes the Finnish Women's Cup)		League cup (Note: Includes the Kansallinen Cup)		Europe (Note: Includes the UEFA Women's Champions League (UWCL) and the UEFA Women's Europa Cup (UWEC))		Total	
Club	Season	Division	Apps	Goals	Apps	Goals	Apps	Goals	Apps	Goals	Apps	Goals
HJK Helsinki	2023	Kansallinen Liiga	20	6	4	1	5	5	–		29	12
HJK Helsinki	2024	Kansallinen Liiga	21	9	4	0	–		–		25	9
HJK Helsinki	2025	Kansallinen Liiga	20	6	4	1	3	0	2	0	29	7
HJK Helsinki	2026	Kansallinen Liiga	19	5	2	1	5	2	4	1	30	9
HJK Helsinki	Total		80	26	14	3	13	7	6	1	113	37
Career total			80	26	14	3	13	7	6	1	113	37

=== International ===
Appearances and goals by national team and year
National team	Year	Apps	Goals
Finland U17	2022	15	3
Finland U17	2023	5	2
Finland U17	Total	20	5
Finland U19	2023	8	1
Finland U19	2024	11	4
Finland U19	2025	2	1
Finland U19	Total	21	6
Finland U23	2025	1	0
Finland	2025	4	0
Finland	2026	1	0
Finland	Total	5	0
Career total		47	11
