= Time in Bulgaria =

Time in Europe: Light Blue / Western European Time / Greenwich Mean Time (UTC); Blue / Western European Time / Greenwich Mean Time (UTC); Blue / Western European Summer Time / British Summer Time / Irish Standard Time (UTC+1); Red / Central European Time (UTC+1); Red / Central European Summer Time (UTC+2); Yellow / Eastern European Time / Kaliningrad Time (UTC+2); Ochre / Eastern European Time (UTC+2); Ochre / Eastern European Summer Time (UTC+3); Green / Moscow Time / Turkey Time (UTC+3); Turquoise / Armenia Time / Azerbaijan Time / Georgia Time / Samara Time (UTC+4); ▉▉▉▉ Pale hues: Standard time observed all year ▉▉▉ Dark hues: Daylight saving time

In Bulgaria, the standard time is Eastern European Time (Bulgarian: Източноевропейско време; EET; UTC+02:00). Daylight saving time, which moves one hour ahead to UTC+03:00 is observed from the last Sunday in March to the last Sunday in October, inline with most EU member states.

== History ==
Bulgaria first observed daylight saving time between 1943 and 1944, and regularly since 1979.

== Time notation ==
Bulgarians commonly use the 24 hour clock. The clock is often used on bus and train timetables.

== IANA time zone database ==
In the IANA time zone database, Bulgaria is given the zone Europe/Sofia:

c.c.*	coordinates*	TZ*	Comments	UTC offset	DST
BG	+4241+02319	Europe/Sofia		+02:00	+03:00

== See also ==
- Time in Europe
- List of time zones by country
- List of time zones by UTC offset
