= Santa Sanija Vuškāne =

Latvian footballer (born 2005)

Personal information
- Date of birth: 22 November 2005 (age 20)
- Place of birth: Limbaži, Latvia
- Height: 1.77 m (5 ft 10 in)
- Position: Forward

Team information
- Current team: Grindavík/Njarðvík

Youth career
- 2018–2019: FK Iecava
- 2019–2021: FK Līvāni

Senior career*
Years	Team	Apps	(Gls)
2021–2024	FK Iecava		
2024	FS Metta Women	8	(11)
2024	FC RFS Women	13	(21)
2025–2026	GKS Katowice	26	(2)
2026–	Grindavík/Njarðvík	0	(0)

International career^{‡}
2020–2022	Latvia U17	6	(6)
2022–2024	Latvia U19	14	(6)
2025–	Latvia	17	(1)
- * Club domestic league appearances and goals as of 20:16, 2 June 2026 (UTC) ‡ National team caps and goals as of 20:16, 2 June 2026 (UTC)

Santa Sanija Vuškāne (born 22 November 2005) is a Latvian professional footballer who plays as a forward for Icelandic club Grindavík/Njarðvík and the Latvia national team.

== Club career ==
In January 2025, Vuškāne signed her first professional contract with Polish side GKS Katowice after the 2024 season in Latvia, during which she scored 32 goals in 21 matches. During her time in Poland, she made 34 appearances and scored two goals in all competitions, helping GKS win the Ekstraliga title in 2025 and the Polish Cup the following year.

On 17 July 2026, Vuškāne moved to Grindavík/Njarðvík in Iceland.

== International career ==
Vuškāne was called up to the Latvia national team for the first time on 18 February 2025. On 8 April 2025, Vuškāne scored her first goal for the national team in a friendly match against Estonia.

== Honours ==
GKS Katowice

- Ekstraliga: 2024–25
- Polish Cup: 2025–26
