= Time in Lithuania =

- Cathedral Bell Tower in Vilnius
- Time zone: Eastern European Time
- Initials: EET
- UTC offset: UTC+02:00

Daylight saving time
- Name: Eastern European Summer Time
- Initials: EEST
- UTC offset: UTC+03:00
- Start: Last Sunday in March (02:00 EET)
- End: Last Sunday in October (03:00 EEST)

tz database
- Europe/Vilnius

Time in Lithuania is given by Eastern European Time (EET; UTC+02:00). Daylight saving time, which moves one hour ahead to UTC+03:00 is observed from the last Sunday in March to the last Sunday in October. Lithuania adopted EET in 1920.

== History ==
Lithuania observed DST between 1941 and 1944, and since 1989 (with a brief break between 2000 and 2002).

== IANA time zone database ==
In the IANA time zone database, Lithuania is given one zone in the file zone.tab – Europe/Vilnius. Data for Lithuania directly from zone.tab of the IANA time zone database; columns marked with * are the columns from zone.tab itself:

c.c.*	coordinates*	TZ*	Comments	UTC offset	DST
LT	+5441+02519	Europe/Vilnius		+02:00	+03:00

== See also ==
- Time in Europe
- List of time zones by country
- List of time zones by UTC offset
