= Sandnes Stadion =

Sports venue in Sandnes, Norway

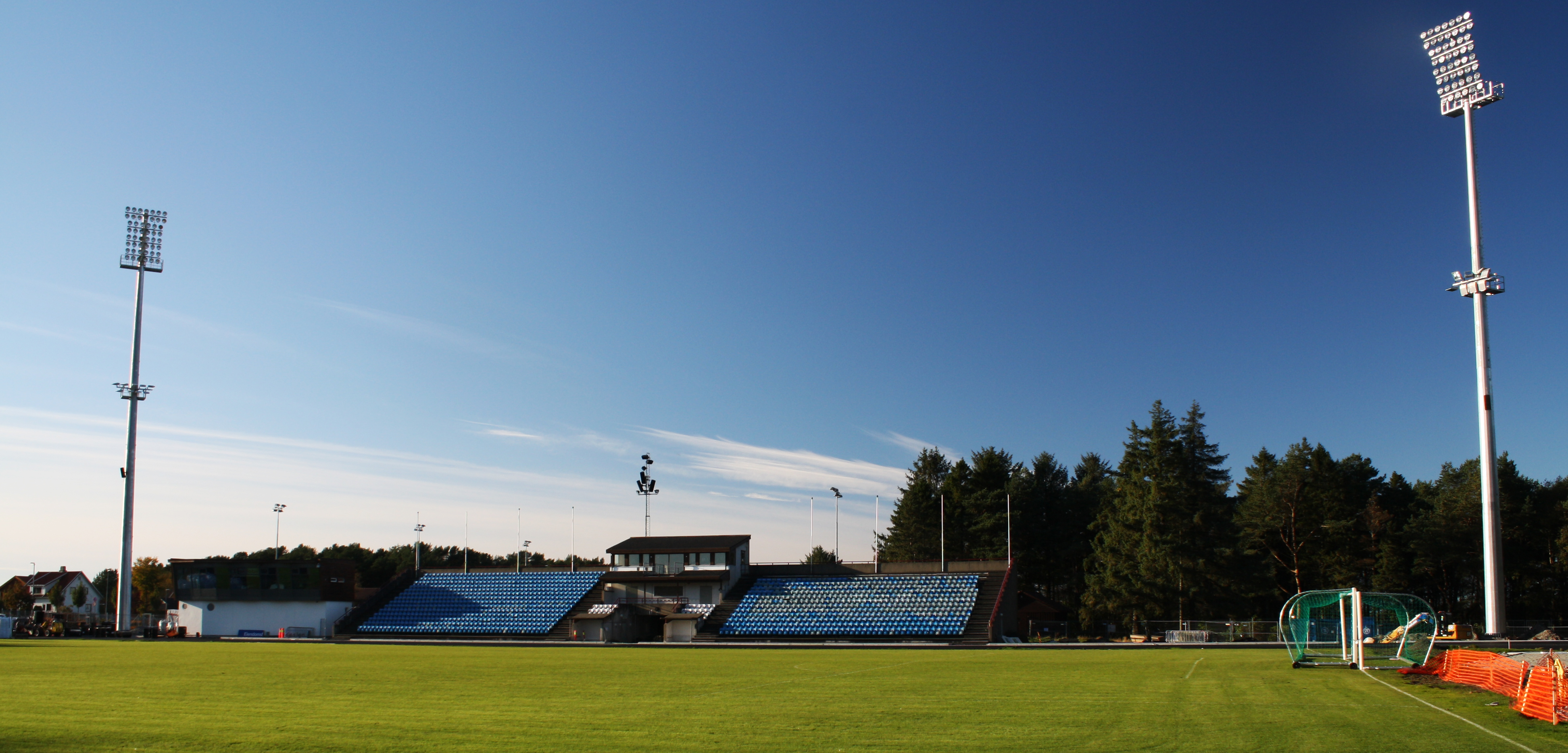
- Interactive map of Sandnes Stadion
- Location: Sandnes, Norway
- Coordinates: 58.8541°N 5.6746°E
- Owner: The municipality of Sandnes
- Operator: The municipality of Sandnes
- Capacity: 4,969 (4,109 seats)
- Surface: Grass
- Field size: 105 x 67 meters

Construction
- Opened: 19 June 1927

Tenants
- Sandnes Ulf (football) 1927 - 2020; Sandnes IL (athletics) 1946 - present

Sandnes Stadion is a multi-purpose stadium located in Sandnes, Rogaland, Norway. It is a part of Sandnes Idrettspark and is currently used mostly for track and field meets and football matches, and was the home ground of Sandnes Ulf until 2020, when Øster Hus Arena (located around 100 meters from Sandnes Stadion) opened. The stadium's capacity is 4,969 (4,109 seats).

== History ==
The stadium was a significant venue for motorcycle speedway and hosted important events. These included the Norwegian Individual Speedway Championship in 1951 and 1967.

The venue hosted the Norwegian Athletics Championships in 1986, 2002, 2010 and 2017. In August 2009, a new floodlight system with a capacity of 1,400 lux was installed. In a 2012 survey carried out by the Norwegian Players' Association among away-team captains, Sandnes Idrettspark was ranked fourth-worst amongst league stadiums, with a score of 2.40 on a scale from one to five.

The seats currently mounted on the stadium's north stand were donated from the old Stavanger Stadion main stand, which was renovated in 2004.

At the start of the 2020 season, Sandnes Ulf moved to the newly built Øster Hus Arena, which is located next to Sandnes Stadion. The stadium is an all-seater with a capacity of 6,046 spectators, with the possibility of a future expansion.
