= Naomi Luyet =

Swiss footballer (born 2005)

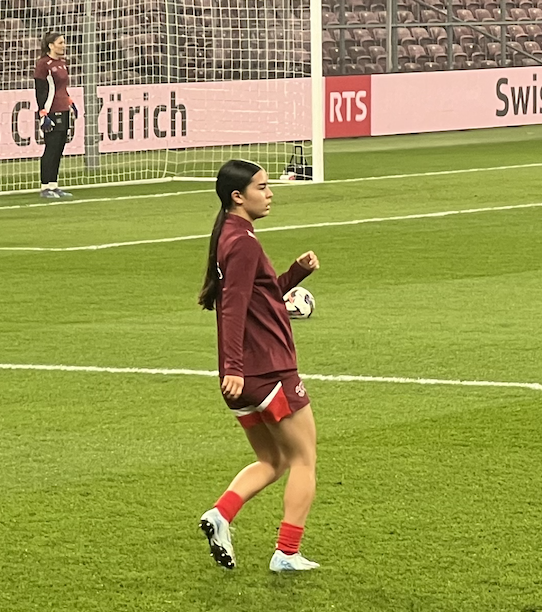
- Naomi Luyet warming up before a friendly against France in 2024.

Personal information
- Date of birth: 19 December 2005 (age 20)
- Place of birth: Savièse, Switzerland
- Height: 1.67 m (5 ft 6 in)
- Positions: Forward; midfielder

Team information
- Current team: TSG Hoffenheim

Youth career
- 2014–2020: FC Savièse
- 2020: FC Sion
- 2020–2021: FC Saxon Sports
- 2021: FC Sion
- 2021–2023: BSC YB Frauen

Senior career*
Years	Team	Apps	(Gls)
2023–2025	BSC YB Frauen	38	(19)
2025–	TSG 1899 Hoffenheim (women)	6	(0)

International career^{‡}
2021	Switzerland U16	2	(0)
2021–2022	Switzerland U17	7	(6)
2021–2024	Switzerland U19	16	(7)
2024–	Switzerland	5	(1)
- * Club domestic league appearances and goals as of 24 May 2026 ‡ National team caps and goals as of 29 October 2024

Naomi Luyet (born 19 December 2005) is a Swiss footballer who plays as a forward or midfielder for TSG 1899 Hoffenheim (women) and the Switzerland national team.

== International career ==
Luyet scored her first senior goal for Switzerland against France.

== Career statistics ==
=== International ===
As of match played 29 October 2024

Appearances and goals by national team and year
National team	Year	Apps	Goals
Switzerland	2024	5	1
Total		5	1

Scores and results list Switzerland's goal tally first, score column indicates score after each Luyet goal.

List of international goals scored by Naomi Luyet
No.	Date	Venue	Opponent	Score	Result	Competition
1	29 October 2024	Stade de Genève, Geneva, Switzerland	France	2–1	2–1	Friendly
