= Alice Marques =

Portuguese association football player (born 2005)

Personal information
- Date of birth: 4 May 2005 (age 21)
- Place of birth: Villeurbanne, France
- Height: 1.70 m (5 ft 7 in)
- Position: Defender

Team information
- Current team: Sevilla FC

Senior career*
Years	Team	Apps	(Gls)
2023–2024	Lyon		
2024–2025	Valencia		
2025–	Sevilla FC		

International career
2021–2022	France U17	7	(2)
2023–2024	France U19	13	(1)
2024	France U20	3	(1)
2024	France U23	1	(0)
2025–	Portugal	1	(0)
- * Club domestic league appearances and goals

Alice Marques is a Portuguese footballer who plays for the Liga F club Sevilla. Alice Marques had previously played for Valencia.

== Early years ==
Marques was born in Villeurbanne, France, in 2005. She comes from a Portuguese family background, with both parents of Portuguese origin.

== Club career ==
In July 2018, Marques joined the Lyon academy.

On 15 July 2024, she signed a contract extension with Olympique Lyonnais, extending her deal until 30 June 2026.

During the 2024–25 season, she was loaned to Spanish club Valencia CF, competing in Liga F. During the 2024–25 campaign, she made 26 appearances in 30 matches, starting 25 games and totaling 2,223 minutes of play, making her one of the most-used players in the squad.

On 5 July 2025, she signed a two-year contract with Sevilla FC.

== International career ==
Marques represented France at youth level. In 2025, at senior level Marques decided to represent Portugal.

== Honours ==
U20 France

- Sud Ladies Cup U20 : 2024

Lyon

- Division 1 Féminine : 2023–24
- French U19 Championship : 2022, 2024
