= Emilía Kiær Ásgeirsdóttir =

Icelandic footballer (born 2005)

Personal information
- Date of birth: 30 January 2005 (age 21)
- Place of birth: Iceland
- Height: 1.70 m (5 ft 7 in)
- Position: Forward

Team information
- Current team: RB Leipzig
- Number: 8

Senior career*
Years	Team	Apps	(Gls)
2020	Afturelding	1	(0)
2020–2024	FC Nordsjælland	74	(25)
2025–	RB Leipzig	40	(9)

International career^{‡}
2021	Denmark U16	3	(0)
2021–2022	Denmark U17	11	(8)
2022–2023	Denmark U19	19	(5)
2024–	Iceland	17	(1)
- * Club domestic league appearances and goals as of 22:40, 8 October 2026 (UTC) ‡ National team caps and goals as of 08:50, 15 October 2026 (UTC)

Emilía Kiær Ásgeirsdóttir (born 30 January 2005) is an Icelandic professional footballer who plays as a forward for Frauen-Bundesliga club RB Leipzig and the Iceland national team.

== Club career ==
Emilía played her first senior team game with Afturelding in 2020 before moving to Denmark and joining FC Nordsjælland. With Nordsjælland, she won the league in 2024, as well as being the leagues top goalscorer, and the Danish Cup in 2023 and 2024.

== International career ==
Born in Iceland to an Icelandic father and a Danish mother, she played for Denmark's junior national teams before deciding to play for the Iceland senior national team in 2024.

== Career statistics ==
=== International ===
As of match played 13 October 2026

Appearances and goals by national team and year
National team	Year	Apps	Goals
Iceland	2024	4	0
Iceland	2025	6	1
Iceland	2026	7	0
Total		17	1

Scores and results list Iceland's goal tally first, score column indicates score after each Ásgeirsdóttir goal.

List of international goals scored by Emilía Kiær Ásgeirsdóttir
No.	Date	Venue	Opponent	Score	Result	Competition
1	29 October 2025	Valbjarnarvöllur, Reykjavík, Iceland	Northern Ireland	3–0	3–0	2025 UEFA Women's Nations League play-off matches

== Honours ==
FC Nordsjælland

- A-Liga: 2024
- Danish Cup: 2023, 2024
- A-Liga top goal scorer: 2024
