= Mathilde Janzen =

German footballer (born 2005)

Personal information
- Full name: Mathilde Olga Luise Janzen
- Date of birth: 14 February 2005 (age 21)
- Place of birth: Hamburg, Germany
- Position: Defender

Team information
- Current team: Hammarby
- Number: 14

Senior career*
Years	Team	Apps	(Gls)
2020–2021	Kristianstad	4	(0)
2021–2023	Hoffenheim II	40	(8)
2023	Hoffenheim	0	(0)
2024	Werder Bremen	1	(0)
2024–2026	Kristianstad	33	(6)
2026–	Hammarby	24	(4)

International career^{‡}
2019	Germany U15	3	(0)
2021–2022	Germany U17	21	(2)
2023–2024	Germany U19	18	(3)
2024	Germany U20	9	(1)
2025	Germany U23	6	(2)
2026	Sweden U23	1	(0)
- * Club domestic league appearances and goals as of 22 November 2026 ‡ National team caps and goals as of 01 April 2026

Mathilde Olga Luise Janzen (born 14 February 2005) is a professional footballer who plays as a midfielder for Damallsvenskan club Hammarby IF. Born in Germany, she is former Germany youth international and committed to play for the Sweden national team.

== International career ==
Janzen was born in Germany and raised in Sweden to a German father and a Swedish mother.

Janzen is a former Germany youth international. On 3 February 2026, her request to switch international allegiance to Sweden was approved by FIFA.
