= Ida Heikkinen =

German footballer

Personal information
- Full name: Ida Elisa Heikkinen
- Date of birth: 13 October 2006 (age 20)
- Place of birth: Espoo, Finland
- Height: 1.72 m (5 ft 7 1/2 in)
- Position: Defender

Team information
- Current team: 1. FC Union Berlin
- Number: 25

Youth career
- -2015: FC Wild
- 2016–2021: FC Honka

Senior career*
Years	Team	Apps	(Gls)
2021–2024	FC Honka	45	(1)
2024–	1. FC Union Berlin	22	(1)

International career^{‡}
2020-2021	Finland U17	20	(1)
2023	Finland U18	1	(0)
2022–2024	Finland U19	7	(0)
2025–	Finland U23	2	(0)
- * Club domestic league appearances and goals as of 24 May 2026 ‡ National team caps and goals as of 28 October 2025

Ida Elisa Heikkinen (born October 13, 2006) is a Finnish footballer who plays as a defender for the women's Bundesliga club 1. FC Union Berlin.

== Club career ==
Heikkinen began playing football for FC Wild, based in Kirkkonummi in the Helsinki region.She later played for the youth team of FC Honka. While still a youth player, Heikkinen made her senior debut for the first team in the Kansallinen Liiga, the top division in Finnish women's football, on 31 July 2021, coming on as a substitute for Eveliina Parikka in the 71st minute of an away match against KuPS. On 13 April 2024, she scored her only goal for FC Honka in a 0–3 away defeat against Ilves, netting the equalizer in the second minute of stoppage time.

On 16 January 2025, she was signed by 1. FC Union Berlin. Her competitive debut came on 8 February 2025, in an away match against Hamburger SV, when she was substituted on for Naika Reissner in the 78th minute. At the end of the season 2024/25, Heikkinen won the second division championship with Union Berlin, securing promotion to the Bundesliga.

== International career ==
Heikkinen made her debut as a national player for the U17 national team and played in the UEFA Women's Under-17 Championship 2022 in Bosnia and Herzegovina, where her team was eliminated in the group stage. She also made appearances for the U18, U19 and U23 national teams.

== Career highlights ==
1. FC Union Berlin

- 2.Bundesliga: 2024–25
