= Mawa Sesay =

Norwegian footballer (born 2005)

Personal information
- Date of birth: 15 April 2005 (age 21)
- Position: Forward

Team information
- Current team: AC Milan
- Number: 17

Youth career
- Hyggen
- Fjell
- Skiold

Senior career*
| Years | Team | Apps | (Gls) |
| 2021–2022 | Strømsgodset | 14 | (21) |
| 2022–2026 | Vålerenga | 40 | (6) |
| 2026– | AC Milan | 5 | (0) |

International career
| 2021 | Norway U16 | 6 | (2) |
| 2022 | Norway U17 | 8 | (1) |
| 2022–2023 | Norway U19 | 12 | (4) |
- * Club domestic league appearances and goals as of 24 June 2026

Mawa Sesay (born 15 April 2005) is a Norwegian footballer who plays as a forward for AC Milan. She has played for some youth Norwegian national teams including the U17 and U19 teams. She was unable to play for over 500 days after a cruciate ligament rupture in early 2023.

== Club career ==
=== Early career ===
Sesay was born on 15 April 2005. She played youth football for Hyggen, Fjell, and Skiold, before becoming part of the newly established women's team of Strømsgodset in the 3rd division in the 2021 season.

=== Vålerenga (2022–2026) ===
Sesay signed for Vålerenga Fotball Damer in August 2022. She debuted in the Toppserien away against Stabæk Fotball Kvinner, on 18 September 2022. Her club number is 14. On 25 March 2023, she scored her first goal in the Toppserien at home against Arna-Bjørnar.

In May 2023, she ruptured her cruciate ligament in a league match against Røa, which kept her out of football for over a year. After being injured she said, "Det er selvfølgelig veldig kjipt, men jeg har troen på ar jeg skal kommer sterkere tilbake." (transl. "It is of course very disappointing, but I believe that I will come back stronger.")

In September 2024, she was back on the field after more than 500 days sidelined due to injury. In autumn of 2024, she was part of the team that won both the league for Vålerenga, as well as leading the club to the group stage of the Champions League for the first time, where she played 7 matches and a total of 31 minutes.

=== AC Milan (2026–) ===
In February 2026, Sesay joined Italian club AC Milan, signing a three-year contract.

== International career ==
Sesay has played international matches for U16, U17, and U19 teams of Norway. In 2022 she played in the 2022 UEFA Women's Under-17 Championship for Norway. Her national team number is 20.
