= Kayleigh van Dooren =

Dutch footballer (born 1999)

Personal information
- Full name: Kayleigh Marit Ellen van Dooren
- Date of birth: 31 July 1999 (age 27)
- Place of birth: Veldhoven, Netherlands
- Height: 1.69 m (5 ft 7 in)
- Position: Attacking midfielder

Team information
- Current team: Roma
- Number: 8

Youth career
- 2004–2014: RKVVO
- 2014–2018: CTO Eindhoven

Senior career*
Years	Team	Apps	(Gls)
2018–2021	PSV	50	(16)
2021–2025	Twente	57	(25)
2025–2026	AC Milan	18	(7)
2026–	Roma	2	(0)

International career^{‡}
2014	Netherlands U15	2	(0)
2015	Netherlands U16	7	(0)
2015–2016	Netherlands U17	8	(3)
2016–2018	Netherlands U19	15	(3)
2019–2021	Netherlands U23	12	(1)
2022–	Netherlands	5	(0)
- * Club domestic league appearances and goals as of 3 October 2026 ‡ National team caps and goals as of 2 December 2025

Kayleigh Marit Ellen van Dooren (born 31 July 1999) is a Dutch professional footballer who plays as an attacking midfielder for Serie A Women club Roma and the Netherlands national team.

== Club career ==
=== Youth ===
Van Dooren started her career with her hometown club RKVVO in 2004. She joined CTO Eindhoven in 2014.

=== PSV ===
In May 2018, van Dooren signed a two-year contract with Vrouwen Eredivisie club PSV. She made her league debut on 7 September 2018 in a 1–0 defeat to Twente. She scored her first league goal on 14 September 2018 in a 5–0 win against VV Alkmaar. After a successful season in which she scored eight goals from 22 league matches, she extended her contract with the club until the end of the 2020–21 season. She scored a hat-trick against Excelsior on 27 September 2019. She scored another hat-trick against Excelsior on 1 November 2020.

=== Twente ===
Van Dooren joined Twente in June 2021 on a two-year deal. On 27 August 2021, she scored on her league debut against Alkmaar in a 8–0 win. She scored a hat-trick against Heerenveen on 16 October 2022. She tore her anterior cruciate ligament in a match against Excelsior in November 2022. On 31 May 2023, she signed a two-year contract extension with the club. After being out injured for 15 months, she returned to the pitch in February 2024. On 31 August 2024, she scored a hat-trick, helping Twente win their third consecutive Dutch Women's Super Cup in a 6–1 win against Ajax.

During the 2024–25 UEFA Women's Champions League, van Dooren scored nine goals in the qualifying rounds and group stage matches. Despite her team's elimination in the group stage, she finished the campaign as the second top scorer, behind Clàudia Pina. In March 2025, it was confirmed that she would leave Twente in June 2025 upon the expiry of her contract. She scored 20 goals in her final season with the club across all competitions, helping Twente to become the first women's side in the Netherlands to achieve a domestic treble of league, national cup, and super cup.

=== AC Milan ===
On 31 July 2025, van Dooren joined Italian club AC Milan on a two-year contract until June 2027. She scored her first goal for the club on 14 September 2025 in a 2–1 win against Ternana.

=== Roma ===
On 28 August 2026, van Dooren joined Roma on a three-year contract until June 2029. She scored her first goal for the club a week later, on 5 September, in a 3–0 win against Fiorentina.

== International career ==
Van Dooren has represented Netherlands at various youth levels. In February 2022, she received her first call-up to the Netherlands national team for the 2022 Tournoi de France. She made her debut on 19 February 2022 in a 3–0 win against Finland.

== Personal life ==
Van Dooren completed her master's degree in business administration from the University of Twente. Apart from her mother tongue Dutch, she is also fluent in English and Italian. She is of Indonesian descent through her grandmother.

== Career statistics ==
=== Club ===
As of match played 19 November 2026

Appearances and goals by club, season and competition
Club	Season	League			National cup (Note: Includes KNVB Women's Cup, Coppa Italia)		League cup (Note: Includes Eredivisie Cup, Serie A Women's Cup)		Champions League		Other		Total	
Club	Season	Division	Apps	Goals	Apps	Goals	Apps	Goals	Apps	Goals	Apps	Goals	Apps	Goals
PSV	2018–19	Vrouwen Eredivisie	22	8	1	0	—		—		—		23	8
PSV	2019–20	Vrouwen Eredivisie	11	3	1	2	6	2	—		—		18	7
PSV	2020–21	Vrouwen Eredivisie	17	5	3	0	5	3	2 (Note: Appearances in UEFA Women's Champions League)	0	—		27	8
PSV	Total		50	16	5	2	11	5	2	0	0	0	68	23
Twente	2021–22	Vrouwen Eredivisie	24	13	2	1	2	0	3	0	—		31	14
Twente	2022–23	Vrouwen Eredivisie	7	6	0	0	0	0	2	1	1 (Note: Appearance in Dutch Women's Super Cup)	0	10	7
Twente	2023–24	Vrouwen Eredivisie	5	0	2	0	2	1	0	0	0	0	9	1
Twente	2024–25	Vrouwen Eredivisie	21	6	4	2	1	0	10	9	1	3	37	20
Twente	Total		57	25	8	3	5	1	15	10	2	3	87	42
AC Milan	2025–26	Serie A Women	18	7	3	0	3	1	—		—		24	8
Roma	2026–27	Serie A Women	2	0	0	0	4	4	4	3	0	0	10	7
Career total			127	48	16	5	23	11	21	13	2	3	189	80

=== International ===
As of match played 2 December 2025

Appearances and goals by national team and year
National team	Year	Apps	Goals
Netherlands	2022	4	0
Netherlands	2024	0	0
Netherlands	2025	1	0
Netherlands	2026	0	0
Total		5	0

== Honours ==
PSV

- KNVB Women's Cup: 2020–21

Twente

- Vrouwen Eredivisie: 2021–22, 2023–24, 2024–25
- KNVB Women's Cup: 2022–23, 2024–25
- Eredivisie Cup: 2021–22, 2022–23, 2023–24
- Dutch Women's Super Cup: 2022, 2023, 2024

Individual

- Serie A Women's Cup top goalscorer: 2026
