= 2026–27 Serie A (women) =

Italian women's football top division, 2026–27 season

Serie A Women
- Season: 2026–27
- Dates: 26 September 2026 – 16 May 2027
- Matches: 33
- Goals: 97 (2.94 per match)
- Top goalscorer: Manuela Giugliano (8 goals)
- Best goalkeeper: Cecilía Rán Rúnarsdóttir (6 clean sheets)
- Biggest home win: Como 1907 4–1 Milan; 27 September 2026; Inter Milan 3–0 Parma; 18 October 2026; Milan 3–0 Ternana; 24 October 2026; Inter Milan 3–0 Lazio; 1 November 2026
- Biggest away win: Como 1907 0–4 Roma; 7 November 2026
- Highest scoring: Juventus 2–5 Roma; 24 October 2026
- Longest winning run: 6 games Roma
- Longest unbeaten run: 6 games Inter Milan; Roma
- Longest winless run: 6 games Lazio; Sassuolo
- Longest losing run: 3 games Juventus; Lazio; Parma; Sassuolo
- All statistics correct as of 7 October 2026.

The 2026–27 Serie A Women, known as the 2026–27 Serie A Women Athora for sponsorship reasons, will be the 60th season of the Serie A Women, the top division of women's football in Italy. The season will begin on 26 September 2026 and will conclude on 16 May 2027.

Roma are the reigning champions, having won their third scudetto as part of their domestic double in the previous season.

== Teams ==
=== Changes ===
▲ Promoted from the 2025–26 Serie B	▼ Relegated to the 2026–27 Serie B
Como 1907	Genoa

=== Stadiums and locations ===
Locations of the 2026–27 Serie A Women teams

Team	Location	Stadium	Capacity
Como 1907	Erba	Centro Sportivo Lambrone	1,000
FC Como	Seregno	Stadio Ferrucio	2,000
Fiorentina	Bagno a Ripoli	Viola Park	3,000
Inter Milan	Milan (Porta Sempione)	Arena Civica	10,000
Juventus	Biella	Stadio La Marmora-Pozzo	5,827
Lazio	Formello	Centro Sportivo di Formello	3,000
Milan	Fiorenzuola d'Arda	Velodromo Attilio Pavesi	4,000
Napoli	Cercola	Stadio Giuseppe Piccolo	3,947
Parma	Noceto	Stadio Il Noce	800
Roma	Rome (EUR)	Stadio Tre Fontane	4,000
Sassuolo	Sassuolo	Stadio Enzo Ricci	4,008
Ternana	Narni	Stadio Moreno Gubbiotti	800

=== Personnel and kits ===
Team	Manager	Captain	Kit manufacturer	Shirt sponsors (front)	Shirt sponsors (back)	Shirt sponsors (sleeve)	Shorts sponsors
FC Como	(Italy) Paolo Tramezzani	(Italy) Giulia Rizzon	(United States) Nike	A Pay E-Wallet	None	TLT Srl	2 Aeffe
Como 1907	(Italy) Selena Mazzantini	(Belgium) Tessa Wullaert	(Germany) Adidas	None	None	Revolut	None
Fiorentina	(Sweden) Pablo Piñones Arce	(Italy) Emma Severini	(Italy) Kappa	Mediacom	Yogurt Greco Altoproteico	Subbyx	Barberino Outlet
Inter Milan	(Italy) David Sassarini	(Italy) Irene Santi	(United States) Nike	Betsson.sport	U-Power	Gate.io	TIM
Juventus	(Spain) Isaac Guerrero	(Italy) Martina Rosucci	(Germany) Adidas	Jeep, Visit Detroit	Allianz	TIM	None
Lazio	(Italy) Gianluca Grassadonia	(Italy) Antonietta Castiello	(Japan) Mizuno	TIM	None	None	None
Milan	(Netherlands) Suzanne Bakker	(Scotland) Christy Grimshaw	(Germany) Puma	Banco BPM	TIM	MSC Cruises	None
Napoli	(Italy) Alessandro Spugna	(Italy) Tecla Pettenuzzo	(Italy) Acerbis	Spirulina Becagli	None	None	None
Parma	(Italy) Giovanni Valenti	(Italy) Caterina Ambrosi	(Germany) Puma	inX.aero	Lavoropiù	None	None
Roma	(Italy) Gianpiero Piovani	(Italy) Manuela Giugliano	(Germany) Adidas	TIM	Auberge Collection	None	HDI Assicurazioni
Sassuolo	(Italy) Salvatore Colantuono	(Scotland) Lana Clelland	(Germany) Puma	Mapei	None	None	None
Ternana	(Italy) Marino Defendi	(Italy) Eleonora Pacioni	(Italy) Macron	Unicusano	None	Connesi	None

=== Managerial changes ===
Team	Outgoing manager	Manner of departure	Date of vacancy	Position in table	Incoming manager	Date of appointment
Juventus	(Italy) Massimiliano Canzi	Mutual consent	3 June 2026	Pre-season	(Spain) Isaac Guerrero	2 July 2026
Inter Milan	(Italy) Gianpiero Piovani	End of contract	23 June 2026	Pre-season	(Italy) David Sassarini	3 July 2026
Roma	(Italy) Luca Rossettini	Sacked	3 July 2026	Pre-season	(Italy) Gianpiero Piovani	4 July 2026
Parma	(Italy) Giovanni Valenti	Sacked	7 October 2026	9th	(Italy) Stefano Sottili	8 October 2026

== League table ==
Pos	Team	Pld	W	D	L	GF	GA	GD	Pts	Qualification
1	Roma	6	6	0	0	21	7	+14	18	Qualification for the Champions League league phase
2	Inter Milan	6	5	1	0	13	0	+13	16	Qualification for the Champions League third qualifying round
3	Como 1907	6	3	2	1	13	11	+2	11	Qualification for the Champions League second qualifying round
4	Fiorentina	6	3	1	2	10	6	+4	10	
5	Juventus	6	3	0	3	12	14	−2	9	
6	FC Como	6	2	2	2	4	5	−1	8	
7	Ternana	6	2	1	3	5	11	−6	7	
8	Milan	6	2	0	4	8	13	−5	6	
9	Napoli	6	1	2	3	7	8	−1	5	
10	Parma	6	1	2	3	3	7	−4	5	
11	Lazio	6	0	3	3	1	7	−6	3	
12	Sassuolo	6	0	2	4	5	13	−8	2	Relegation to the Serie B

Updated to match(es) played on 8 November 2026. Source: Soccerway
Rules for classification: 1) Points; 2) Tiebreaker for the Champions League team and the relegated team; 3) Head-to-head points; 4) Head-to-head goal difference; 5) Goal difference; 6) Goals scored; 7) Draw

=== Positions by round ===
Team ╲ Round	1	2	3	4	5	6	7	8	9	10	11	12	13	14	15	16	17	18	19	20	21	22
Roma	3	1	2	1	1																	
Inter Milan	4	3	1	2	2																	
Como 1907	1	2	3	3	3																	
FC Como	5	4	6	7	4																	
Fiorentina	11	6	5	4	5																	
Ternana	8	8	4	6	6																	
Milan	12	5	8	5	7																	
Juventus	2	7	7	9	8																	
Napoli	9	11	9	8	9																	
Parma	7	9	11	11	10																	
Lazio	6	10	10	10	11																	
Sassuolo	10	12	12	12	12																	

Leader and UEFA Champions League league stage
UEFA Champions League third qualifying round
UEFA Champions League second qualifying round
Relegation to the Serie B

Updated to match(es) played on 6 November 2026. Source: Soccerway

== Results ==
Home \ Away	COM	FCC	FIO	INT	JUV	LAZ	MIL	NAP	PAR	ROM	SAS	TER
Como 1907	—						4–1			0–4	2–2	
FC Como		—	1–1	0–2			1–0					
Fiorentina			—		1–2						2–0	
Inter Milan			2–0	—	a	3–0	a		3–0			
Juventus	2–4		a	a	—		a	3–1		2–5	2–1	
Lazio		0–0				—		0–0	0–0	a		
Milan				0–3	2–1		—					3–0
Napoli	1–2			0–0	a			—		a		
Parma		1–0	1–2						—			1–2
Roma						3–1	4–2	2–1		—		
Sassuolo								1–4	0–0	1–3	—	
Ternana	1–1	1–2	0–4			1–0						—

Updated to match(es) played on 8 November 2026. Source: Soccerway
Legend: Blue = home team win; Yellow = draw; Red = away team win.
For upcoming matches, an "a" indicates there is an article about the rivalry between the two participants.

=== Results by round ===
Team ╲ Round	1	2	3	4	5	6	7	8	9	10	11	12	13	14	15	16	17	18	19	20	21	22
Como 1907	W	W	W	D	D	L																
FC Como	W	L	D	D	W	L																
Fiorentina	L	W	D	W	L	W																
Inter Milan	W	W	W	D	W	W																
Juventus	W	L	L	L	W	W																
Lazio	D	L	L	D	L	D																
Milan	L	W	L	W	L	L																
Napoli	L	L	W	D	L	D																
Parma	D	L	L	L	D	W																
Roma	W	W	W	W	W	W																
Sassuolo	L	L	L	D	D	L																
Ternana	L	W	W	L	D	L																

Updated to match(es) played on 8 November 2026. Source: Soccerway
W = Win; D = Draw; L = Loss; P = Postponed

== Season statistics ==
=== Top scorers ===
Rank	Player	Club	Goals
1	(Italy) Manuela Giugliano	Roma	8
2	(Malta) Haley Bugeja	Inter Milan	6
3	(Spain) Alba Redondo	Juventus	5
4	(Belgium) Tessa Wullaert	Como 1907	4
5	(Italy) Agnese Bonfantini	Como 1907	3
5	(Italy) Giada Pellegrino Cimò	Roma	3
5	(Scotland) Lana Clelland	Sassuolo	3
5	(Suriname) Chanté Dompig	Napoli	3
5	(Scotland) Christy Grimshaw	Milan	3
5	(Denmark) Sofie Hornemann	Ternana	3

==== Hat-tricks ====
Player	For	Against	Result	Date
(Suriname) Chanté Dompig	Napoli	Sassuolo	4–1 (A)	17 October 2026

=== Clean sheets ===
Rank	Player	Club	Clean sheets
1	(Iceland) Cecilía Rán Rúnarsdóttir	Inter Milan	6
2	(Romania) Camelia Ceasar	Parma	2
2	(Italy) Astrid Gilardi	FC Como	2
4	(Italy) Rachele Baldi	Roma	1
4	(Switzerland) Noemi Benz	Sassuolo	1
4	(Serbia) Sara Cetinja	Lazio	1
4	(Italy) Gloria Ciccioli	Ternana	1
4	(Spain) Sandra Estévez	Milan	1
4	(Norway) Cecilie Fiskerstrand	Fiorentina	1
4	(Finland) Sofia Manner	Napoli	1
4	(Sweden) Angel Mukasa	Lazio	1

=== Discipline ===
==== Player ====
- Most yellow cards: 3
  - (Italy) Valentina Bergamaschi (Roma)
- Most red cards: 1
  - (Spain) Sandra Estévez (Milan)
  - (Sweden) Freja Olofsson (Como 1907)
  - (France) Clarisse Le Bihan (Inter Milan)
  - (Italy) Bianca Vergani (Roma)

==== Club ====
- Most yellow cards: 8
  - Lazio
  - Sassuolo
  - Ternana
- Most red cards: 1
  - Como 1907
  - Inter Milan
  - Juventus
  - Roma
- Fewest yellow cards: 4
  - FC Como
- Fewest red cards: 0
