= Léa Khelifi =

French footballer (born 1999)

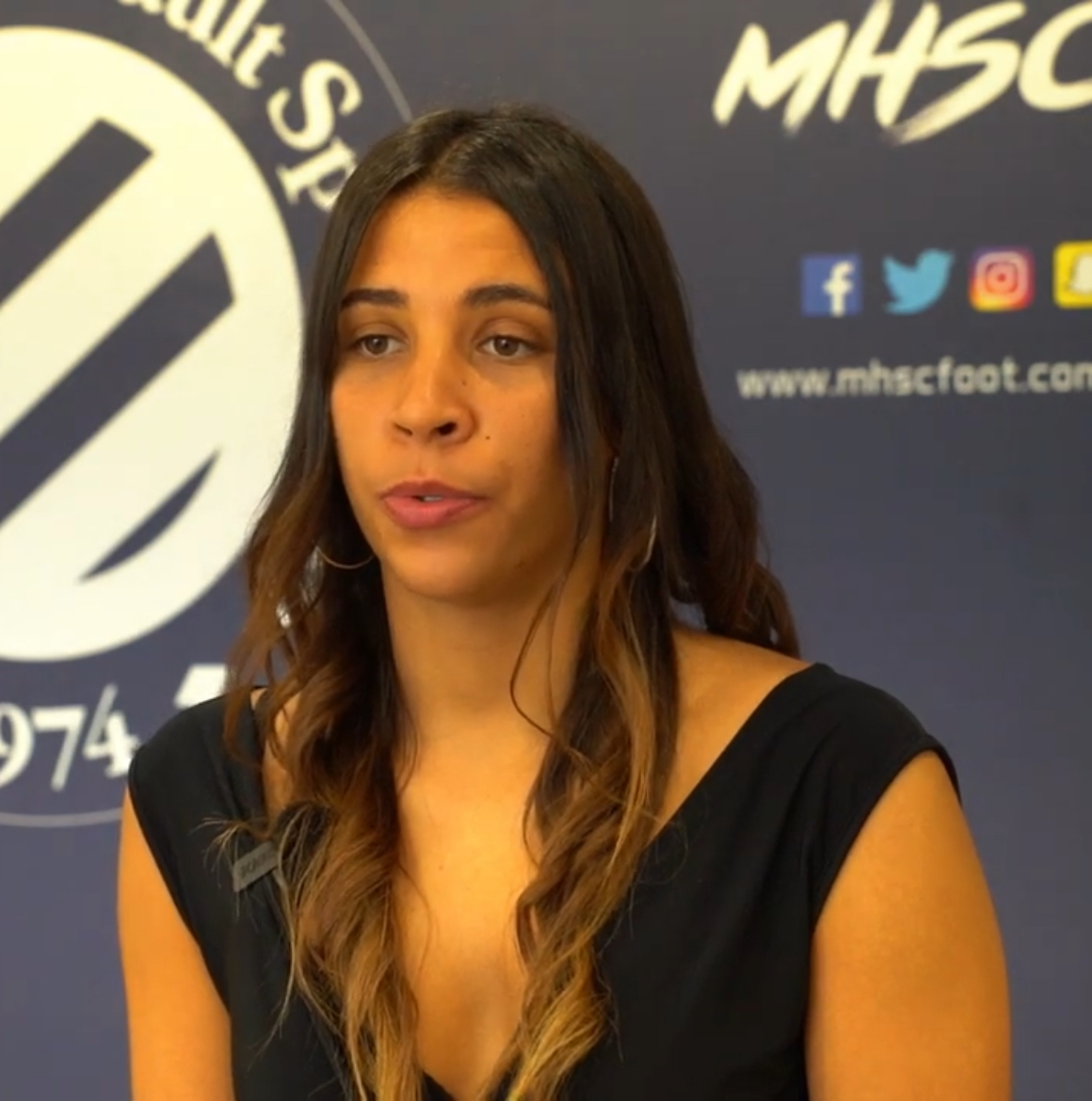
- Khelifi in 2022

Personal information
- Date of birth: 12 May 1999 (age 27)
- Place of birth: Strasbourg, France
- Height: 1.69 m (5 ft 7 in)
- Position: Midfielder

Team information
- Current team: Juventus
- Number: 26

Youth career
- 2005–2009: US Behren-lès-Forbach
- 2009: L'Hôpital
- 2010: US Behren-lès-Forbach
- 2010–2014: US Forbach
- 2014–2016: Metz

Senior career*
Years	Team	Apps	(Gls)
2015–2019	Metz	61	(18)
2019–2022	Paris Saint-Germain	20	(7)
2020–2021	→ Dijon (loan)	16	(4)
2022–2025	Montpellier	47	(11)
2025–2026	Nantes	19	(7)
2026–	Juventus	1	(0)

International career
2015	France U16	4	(1)
2015–2016	France U17	10	(0)
2017–2018	France U19	10	(5)
2018	France U20	3	(0)
2019–2022	France U23	10	(3)
2021	France	4	(0)
- * Club domestic league appearances and goals as of 26 September 2026

Léa Khelifi (born 12 May 1999) is a French professional footballer who plays as a midfielder for Serie A club Juventus.

== Club career ==
=== Metz ===
A youth academy graduate of Metz, Khelifi made her senior team debut on 22 November 2015 by scoring a hat-trick in a 13–0 league win against CS Mars Bischheim. She won the Division 2 Féminine during the 2017–18 season. Khelifi scored eight goals for Metz during the 2018–19 Division 1 Féminine season. She was also named among the best hopes of the French championship, at the UNFP trophies at the end of the 2018–2019 season. She scored 20 goals from 68 matches for the club in all competitions.

=== PSG ===
On 7 June 2019, Paris Saint-Germain announced the signing of Khelifi on a three-year deal. In her time with the club, she won the Division 1 Féminine during the 2020–21 season. Khelifi also won the 2021–22 Coupe de France féminine.

==== Loan to Dijon ====
Khelifi joined Dijon in September 2020 on a season long loan deal.

=== Montpellier ===
On 30 June 2022, Khelifi joined Montpellier. She made her league debut against Dijon on 10 September 2022. Khelifi scored her first league goal against Soyaux on 19 November 2022, scoring in the 19th minute. During her first season with Montpellier, she struggled with injuries, however she refound her form during her 2nd season with 4 goals and 6 assists.

=== Nantes ===
On 16 June 2025, she joined Première Ligue side Nantes.

=== Juventus ===
On 12 July 2026, it was announced that Khelifi had joined Italian Serie A club Juventus on a two-year contract, running until 30 June 2028.

== International career ==
Khelifi is a former French youth international. She was part of French squad at 2018 UEFA Women's Under-19 Championship.

Khelifi made her senior team debut on 23 February 2021 in a 2–0 win against Switzerland.

== Style of play ==
Khelifi prefers to assist her teammates and can play in most positions.

== Personal life ==
Khelifi is of Algerian origin; her parents are originally from a town near Sétif.

== Career statistics ==
=== Club ===
As of match played 19 September 2026

Appearances and goals by club, season and competition
Club	Season	League			National cup (Note: Includes Coupe de France Féminine, Coppa Italia)		League cup (Note: Includes Coupe LFFP, Serie A Women's Cup)		Continental		Other		Total	
Club	Season	Division	Apps	Goals	Apps	Goals	Apps	Goals	Apps	Goals	Apps	Goals	Apps	Goals
Metz	2015–16	Seconde Ligue	7	4	2	0	—		—		—		9	4
Metz	2016–17	Première Ligue	16	1	2	2	—		—		—		18	3
Metz	2017–18	Seconde Ligue	16	5	1	0	—		—		—		17	5
Metz	2018–19	Première Ligue	22	8	2	0	—		—		—		24	8
Metz	Total		61	18	7	2	0	0	0	0	0	0	68	20
Paris Saint-Germain	2019–20	Première Ligue	7	2	4	2	—		3 (Note: Appearances in UEFA Women's Champions League)	0	0	0	14	4
Paris Saint-Germain	2020–21	Première Ligue	1	0	0	0	—		0	0	—		1	0
Paris Saint-Germain	2021–22	Première Ligue	12	5	1	0	—		4	2	—		17	7
Paris Saint-Germain	Total		20	7	5	2	0	0	7	2	0	0	32	11
Dijon (loan)	2020–21	Première Ligue	16	4	1	0	—		—		—		17	4
Montpellier	2022–23	Première Ligue	9	1	0	0	—		—		—		9	1
Montpellier	2023–24	Première Ligue	18	6	1	0	—		—		—		19	6
Montpellier	2024–25	Première Ligue	20	4	2	1	—		—		—		22	5
Montpellier	Total		47	11	3	1	0	0	0	0	0	0	50	12
Nantes	2025–26	Première Ligue	19	7	2	1	2	1	—		1 (Note: Appearance in playoffs)	0	24	9
Juventus	2026–27	Serie A Women	0	0	0	0	3	1	1	0	0	0	4	1
Career total			163	47	18	6	5	2	8	2	1	0	195	57

=== International ===
As of match played 17 September 2021

Appearances and goals by national team and year
National team	Year	Apps	Goals
France	2021	4	0
Total		4	0

== Honours ==
Metz

- Division 2 Féminine: 2017–18

Paris Saint-Germain

- Division 1 Féminine: 2020–21
- Coupe de France Féminine: 2021–22

Juventus

- Serie A Women's Cup: 2026
