= 2026 Serie A Women's Cup =

Tournament details
- Country: Italy
- Dates: 21 August – 19 September 2026
- Teams: 12

Final positions
- Champions: Juventus (2nd title)
- Runners-up: Roma

Tournament statistics
- Matches played: 21
- Goals scored: 60 (2.86 per match)
- Top goal scorer(s): Kayleigh van Dooren (4 goals)
- Goals scored in penalty shoot-outs not included.

The 2026 Serie A Women's Cup was the inaugural season of the Serie A Women's Cup, the league cup competition for the Serie A Women, the top division of Italian women's football.

The competition commenced on 21 August and concluded on 19 September. The final will be held at the Stadio Torquato Bresciani in Viareggio, Lucca, Tuscany.

Juventus are the reigning champions.

== Teams ==
All 12 teams in the 2026–27 Serie A Women are participating in the competition. Each team was given a rank based on their position in the 2025–26 Serie A Women (or for the 2025–26 Serie B Women for newly-promoted Como 1907), with Juventus ranked first as the reigning champions of the tournament.

== Group stage ==
=== Group A ===
Pos	Team	Pld	W	D	L	GF	GA	GD	Pts	Qualification	INT	LAZ	PAR	NAP
1	Inter Milan	3	3	0	0	10	1	+9	9	Advance to the semi-finals		3–1		6–0
2	Lazio	3	2	0	1	7	5	+2	6				2–0	4–2
3	Parma	3	0	0	3	0	4	−4	0		0–1			
4	Napoli	3	1	0	2	3	10	−7	3				1–0	

Source: Italian Football Federation (in Italian)

21 August 2026	Parma	0–1	Inter Milan	Noceto
20:30 CEST		Report	Vilhjálmsdóttir 47'	Stadium: Stadio Il Noce; Referee: Juri Gallorini (Arezzo)

23 August 2026	Lazio	4–2	Napoli	Formello
20:30 CEST	Camacho 10', 87' (pen.); Monnecchi 72'; Masu 84'	Report	Banušić 2', 44' (pen.)	Stadium: Centro Sportivo di Formello; Referee: Cristiano Ursini (Pescara)

30 August 2026	Inter Milan	6–0	Napoli	Milan
18:00 CEST	Bugeja 5', 51' (pen.); Van Diemen 21'; Bartoli 30'; Raphino 34'; Le Bihan 88'	Report		Stadium: Arena Civica; Referee: Mansour Faye (Brescia)

30 August 2026	Lazio	2–0	Parma	Formello
18:00 CEST	Goldoni 22'; Martín 41'	Report		Stadium: Centro Sportivo di Formello; Referee: Simone Palmieri (Avellino)

6 September 2026	Inter Milan	3–1	Lazio	Milan
15:00 CEST	Vilhjálmsdóttir 40'; Tomašević 52'; Raphino 90+6'	Report	Monnecchi 16'	Stadium: Arena Civica; Referee: Davide Gandino (Alessandria)

6 September 2026	Napoli	1–0	Parma	Cercola
15:00 CEST	Faurskov 63'	Report		Stadium: Stadio Giuseppe Piccolo; Referee: Enrico Eremitaggio (Ancona)

=== Group B ===
Pos	Team	Pld	W	D	L	GF	GA	GD	Pts	Qualification	SAS	ROM	FIO	TER
1	Sassuolo	3	3	0	0	5	1	+4	9	Advance to the semi-finals				2–0
2	Roma	3	2	0	1	5	1	+4	6	Advance to the semi-finals	0–1		3–0	
3	Fiorentina	3	1	0	2	4	6	−2	3		1–2			3–1
4	Ternana	3	0	0	3	1	7	−6	0			0–2		

Source: Italian Football Federation (in Italian)

22 August 2026	Ternana	0–2	Roma	Narni
18:00 CEST		Report	Pilgrim 14', 45'	Stadium: Stadio Moreno Gubbiotti; Referee: Gabriele Sacchi (Macerata)

22 August 2026	Fiorentina	1–2	Sassuolo	Bagno a Ripoli
18:00 CEST	Bredgaard 77'	Report	Skupień 21'; Fadda 89'	Stadium: Viola Park; Referee: Flavio Barbetti (Arezzo)

30 August 2026	Roma	0–1	Sassuolo	Rome
18:00 CEST		Report	Clelland 56'	Stadium: Stadio Tre Fontane; Referee: Domenico Mirabella (Naples)

30 August 2026	Fiorentina	3–1	Ternana	Bagno a Ripoli
20:30 CEST	Van der Zanden 42'; Snerle 44'; Woldvik 90+1'	Report	Yang 47'	Stadium: Viola Park; Referee: Juri Gallorini (Arezzo)

5 September 2026	Roma	3–0	Fiorentina	Rome
17:30 CEST	Greggi 19', 82'; Van Dooren 90+8'	Report		Stadium: Stadio Tre Fontane; Referee: Simone Gavini (Aprilia)

5 September 2026	Sassuolo	2–0	Ternana	Sassuolo
17:30 CEST	Galabadaarachchi 9'; Palakovics 33'	Report		Stadium: Stadio Enzo Ricci; Referee: Lorenzo Massari (Turin)

=== Group C ===
Pos	Team	Pld	W	D	L	GF	GA	GD	Pts	Qualification	JUV	FCC	MIL	COM
1	Juventus	3	3	0	0	4	0	+4	9	Advance to the semi-finals		1–0	1–0	
2	FC Como	3	1	1	1	3	3	0	4					2–1
3	Milan	3	1	1	1	3	3	0	4			1–1		2–1
4	Como 1907	3	0	0	3	2	6	−4	0		0–2			

Source: Italian Football Federation (in Italian)

21 August 2026	Como 1907	0–2	Juventus	Como
18:00 CEST		Report	Redondo 25'; Chiba 79'	Stadium: Stadio Giuseppe Sinigaglia; Referee: Davide Cerea (Bergamo)

22 August 2026	Milan	1–1	Como	Milan
20:30 CEST	Kanutte 4'	Report	Borbye 80'	Stadium: Centro Sportivo Vismara; Referee: Vittorio Emanuele Teghille (Collegno)

29 August 2026	Juventus	1–0	Como	Biella
18:00 CEST	Khelifi 13'	Report		Stadium: Stadio La Marmora-Pozzo; Referee: Simone Gauzolino (Turin)

29 August 2026	Milan	2–1	Como 1907	Milan
20:30 CEST	Kyvåg 21'; Kamczyk 70'	Report	Wullaert 56' (pen.)	Stadium: Centro Sportivo Vismara; Referee: Maksym Frasynyak (Gallarate)

6 September 2026	Juventus	1–0	Milan	Biella
12:30 CEST	Capeta 78'	Report		Stadium: Stadio La Marmora-Pozzo; Referee: Gabriele Restaldo (Ivrea)

6 September 2026	FC Como	2–1	Como	Meda
12:30 CEST	Olofsson 27' (o.g.); Vigilucci 56'	Report	Wullaert 15'	Stadium: Stadio Mino Favini; Referee: Cosimo Papi (Prato)

=== Ranking of second-placed teams ===
Pos	Grp	Team	Pld	W	D	L	GF	GA	GD	Pts	Qualification
1	B	Roma	3	2	0	1	5	1	+4	6	Advance to the semi-finals
2	A	Lazio	3	2	0	1	7	5	+2	6	
3	C	Como	3	1	1	1	3	3	0	4	

Source: Italian Football Federation (in Italian)

== Knockout stage ==
=== Semi-finals ===
12 September 2026	Juventus	1–0	Inter Milan	Biella
20:30 CEST	Van Diemen 34' (o.g.)	Report		Stadium: Stadio La Marmora-Pozzo; Referee: Federico Tassano (Chiavari)

13 September 2026	Sassuolo	1–7	Roma	Sassuolo
12:00 CEST	Fercocq 87'	Report	Van Dooren 5', 6'; Piemonte 15', 48', 64'; Doms 38'; Giugliano 54' (pen.)	Stadium: Stadio Enzo Ricci; Referee: Mattia Nigro (Prato)

=== Final ===
19 September 2026
18:00 CEST

Juventus	2–2 (a.e.t.)	Roma
Penalties
	4–2

Stadio Torquato Bresciani, Viareggio

== Statistics ==
As of 13 September 2026

=== Top goalscorers ===
Rank	Player	Club	Goals
1	(Italy) Martina Piemonte	Roma	3
1	(Netherlands) Kayleigh van Dooren	Roma	3
3	(Sweden) Marija Banušić	Napoli	2
3	(Malta) Haley Bugeja	Inter Milan	2
3	(Spain) Carla Camacho	Lazio	2
3	(Italy) Giada Greggi	Roma	2
3	(Italy) Margherita Monnecchi	Lazio	2
3	(Switzerland) Alayah Pilgrim	Roma	2
3	(Haiti) Brittany Raphino	Inter Milan	2
3	(Iceland) Karólína Lea Vilhjálmsdóttir	Inter Milan	2
3	(Belgium) Tessa Wullaert	Como 1907	2
