= Alba Redondo =

Spanish footballer (born 1996)

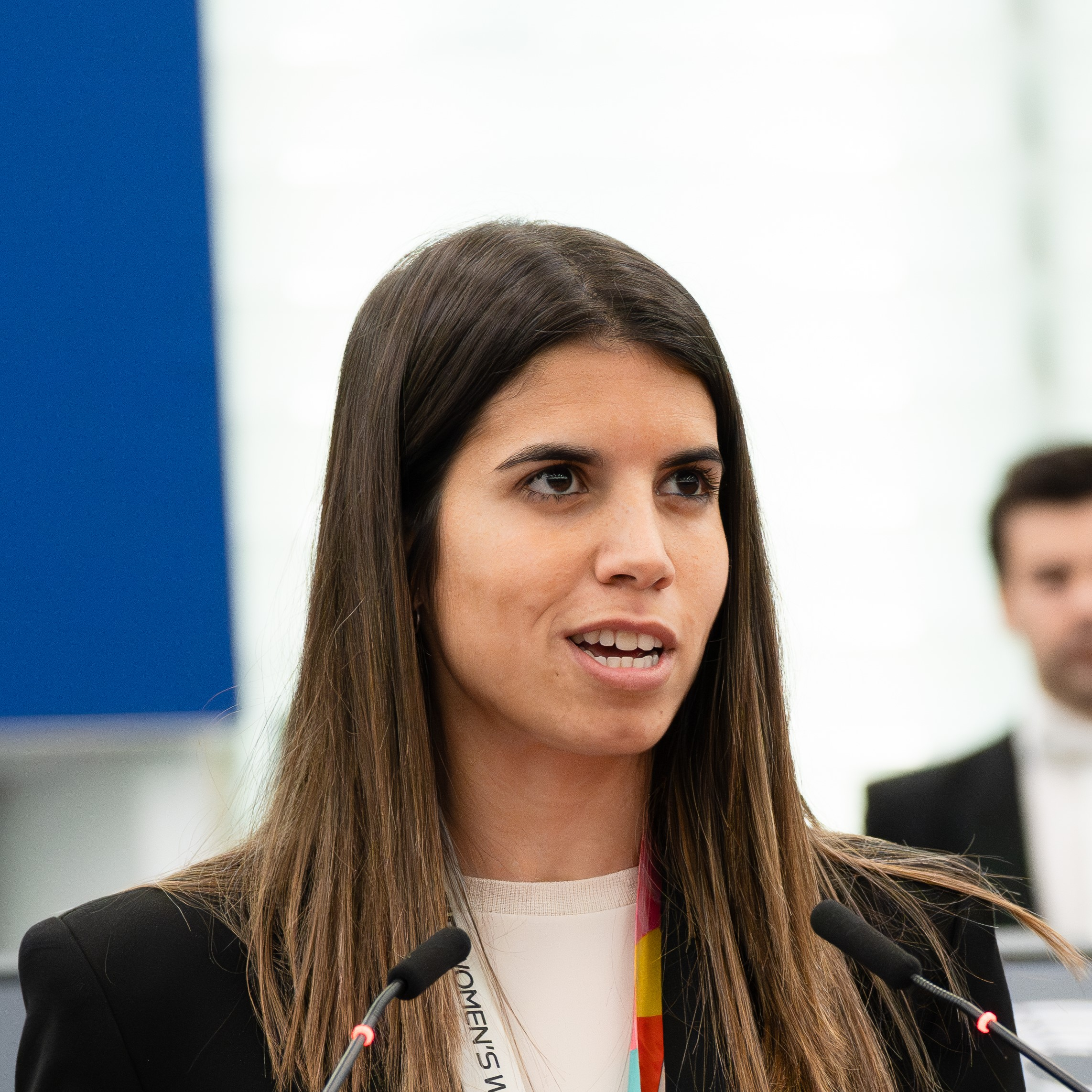
- Alba Redondo speaking in the European Parliament, March 2024

Personal information
- Full name: Alba María Redondo Ferrer
- Date of birth: 27 August 1996 (age 30)
- Place of birth: Albacete, Spain
- Height: 1.68 m (5 ft 6 in)
- Positions: Forward; attacking midfielder

Team information
- Current team: Juventus
- Number: 20

Youth career
- Fundación Albacete

Senior career*
Years	Team	Apps	(Gls)
2009–2012	Fundación Albacete B		
2012–2019	Fundación Albacete	137	(53)
2019–2024	Levante	135	(71)
2024–2026	Real Madrid	55	(22)
2026–	Juventus	0	(0)

International career^{‡}
2014–2015	Spain U19	14	(6)
2018–	Spain	44	(16)
Medal record
Women's football
Representing Spain
FIFA Women's World Cup
Winner	2023 Australia–New Zealand
UEFA Women's Championship
Runner-up	2025 Switzerland
UEFA Women's Nations League
Winner	2024 France–Netherlands–Spain
- * Club domestic league appearances and goals as of 19:54, 27 May 2026 (UTC) ‡ National team caps and goals as of 05:40, 31 May 2025 (UTC)

Alba María Redondo Ferrer (Spanish pronunciation: [ˈalβa maɾi.a reˈðondo feˈreɾ]; born 27 August 1996) is a Spanish professional footballer who plays as a forward for Serie A club Juventus and the Spain national team. In January 2024, she ranked 61st on the Guardian's 2023 list of the 100 Best Female Footballers in the World.

== Club career ==
Redondo progressed through the youth system at her hometown club Fundación Albacete. In 2014, 17-year-old Redondo scored twice as "El Funda" beat UD Granadilla Tenerife 2–0 to secure promotion to the top-level Primera División. The 2018–19 Primera División season ended in disappointment for Redondo when her 15 league goals failed to stop Fundación Albacete from finishing bottom of the league and being relegated.

In June 2019, Redondo transferred to Levante, signing a two-year contract with a further one-year option. In November 2019 she scored twice against EdF Logroño but was knocked unconscious near the end of the match. The physiotherapist who then ran on to treat her was then sent off by the referee for not asking permission to enter the pitch. The following month, Redondo endeared herself to the Levante supporters when she struck the only goal in a win over local rivals Valencia. Redondo won the Pichichi award for being the top goalscorer in the 2022–23 Liga F season.

On 2 July 2024, Redondo signed for Real Madrid. She quickly proved why Real Madrid brought her to the club, finishing the 2024–25 season as the team's top scorer with 20 goals in all competitions. However, Real Madrid failed to win any trophies that season. Redondo spent another season at Real Madrid and ended her stint with the club having scored 28 goals in 69 appearances across all competitions.

In July 2026, Redondo joined Serie A club Juventus on a two-year contract until 2028. On 19 September that year, her brace helped Juventus draw 2–2 against Roma in the final of the 2026 Serie A Women's Cup: the Bianconere later won the penalty shoot-out to clinch their first seasonal trophy. She scored her 11th goal of the season against Fiorentina on 3 November 2026.

== International career ==
Alba Redondo took part in the qualification for the 2013 U17 European Championship with the Spanish U17 national team. With the U19s she reached the final of the continental tournament in both 2014 and 2015, but lost to the Netherlands and Sweden respectively. In 2015, with three goals in five games, she was level with Marie-Charlotte Léger and was the tournament's second-best goalscorer behind Stina Blackstenius. Alba Redondo took part in the 2016 World Cup with the U20 national team, where she and her team were defeated in the quarterfinals by North Korea, who later won the tournament.

Despite competing for Albacete that was frequently fighting in relegation battle, Redondo developed into a proficient goalscorer and came to the attention of Spain national team scouts. She made her debut for the senior national team on 8 November 2018 in a friendly against Poland, and was also called up for the 2019 Algarve Cup. However, national coach Jorge Vilda did not include her in the 23-player final squad for the 2019 World Cup. Redondo was not named to the Spanish squad for the Euro 2022 either.

Redondo made seven appearances at the 2023 World Cup and scored three goals. She was in the starting line-up for the World Cup final as Spain defeated England 1–0 to win the trophy for the first time.

On 10 June 2025, Redondo was called up to the Spain squad for the UEFA Women's Euro 2025.

== Personal life ==
Redondo is in a relationship with Cristina Monleón, a sports and exercise scientist at the University of Valencia. She is not related to former Argentine and Real Madrid midfielder Fernando Redondo. In 2024, she and Ivana Andrés gave a speech at the European Parliament in Strasbourg to advocate for gender equality in sports.

== Career statistics ==
=== Club ===
As of match played 3 November 2026

Appearances and goals by club, season and competition
Club	Season	League			National cup (Note: Appearances in Copa de la Reina) (Note: Appearances in Coppa Italia)		Continental (Note: Appearances in UEFA Women's Champions League)		Other		Total	
Club	Season	Division	Apps	Goals	Apps	Goals	Apps	Goals	Apps	Goals	Apps	Goals
Fundación Albacete	2012–13	Segunda División			–		–		–			
Fundación Albacete	2013–14	Segunda División			–		–		–			
Fundación Albacete	2014–15	Primera División	28	8	–		–		–		28	8
Fundación Albacete	2015–16	Primera División	25	9	–		–		–		25	9
Fundación Albacete	2016–17	Primera División	26	6	–		–		–		26	6
Fundación Albacete	2017–18	Primera División	27	16	–		–		–		27	16
Fundación Albacete	2018–19	Primera División	30	14	0	0	–		–		30	14
Fundación Albacete	Total		136	53	0	0	–		–		136	53
Levante	2019–20	Primera División	19	9	1	0	–		1 (Note: Appearances in Supercopa de España)	0	21	9
Levante	2020–21	Primera División	30	7	3	1	–		1	0	34	8
Levante	2021–22	Primera División	30	12	2	3	4	1	1	0	37	16
Levante	2022–23	Liga F	30	27	1	1	–		–		31	28
Levante	2023–24	Liga F	26	16	2	0	2	2	2	0	32	18
Levante	Total		135	71	9	5	6	3	5	0	155	79
Real Madrid	2024–25	Liga F	29	15	4	1	8	4	2	0	43	20
Real Madrid	2025–26	Liga F	26	7	1	0	9	3	1	0	37	10
Real Madrid	Total		55	22	5	1	17	7	3	0	80	30
Juventus	2026–27	Serie A	5	4	0	0	7	4	5 (Note: Appearances in Serie A Women's Cup) (Note: Appearances in Supercoppa Italiana)	3	17	11
Juventus	Total		5	4	0	0	7	4	5	3	17	11
Career total			331	146	14	6	30	14	13	3	388	173

=== International ===
As of match played 30 May 2025

Appearances and goals by national team and year
National team	Year	Apps	Goals
Spain	2018	1	0
Spain	2019	5	2
Spain	2020	4	1
Spain	2021	7	2
Spain	2022	5	4
Spain	2023	14	5
Spain	2024	5	1
Spain	2025	3	1
Total		44	16

Scores and results list Spain's goal tally first, score column indicates score after each Redondo goal.

List of international goals scored by Alba Redondo
No.	Date	Venue	Opponent	Score	Result	Competition
1	17 January 2019	Estadio Cartagonova, Cartagena, Spain	Belgium	1–0	1–1	Friendly
2	17 May 2019	Estadio Pedro Escartín, Guadalajara, Spain	Cameroon	2–0	4–0	Friendly
3	19 September 2020	Zimbru Stadium, Chișinău, Moldova	Moldova	6–0	9–0	UEFA Women's Euro 2022 qualifying
4	26 October 2021	Kolos Stadium, Kovalivka, Ukraine	Ukraine	6–0	6–0	2023 FIFA Women's World Cup qualification
5	25 November 2021	Estadio de la Cartuja, Seville, Spain	Faroe Islands	3–0	12–0	2023 FIFA Women's World Cup qualification
6	6 September 2022	La Ciudad del Fútbol, Las Rozas de Madrid, Spain	Ukraine	2–0	5–0	2023 FIFA Women's World Cup qualification
7	6 September 2022	La Ciudad del Fútbol, Las Rozas de Madrid, Spain	Ukraine	3–0	5–0	2023 FIFA Women's World Cup qualification
8	11 November 2022	Estadio Municipal Álvarez Claro, Melilla, Spain	Argentina	1–0	7–0	Friendly
9	15 November 2022	Estadio de la Cartuja, Seville, Spain	Japan	1–0	1–0	Friendly
10	19 February 2023	CommBank Stadium, Sydney, Australia	Australia	2–3	2–3	2023 Cup of Nations
11	11 April 2023	Estadi Municipal de Can Misses, Ibiza, Spain	China	1–0	3–0	Friendly
12	26 July 2023	Eden Park, Auckland, New Zealand	Zambia	3–0	5–0	2023 FIFA Women's World Cup
13	26 July 2023	Eden Park, Auckland, New Zealand	Zambia	5–0	5–0	2023 FIFA Women's World Cup
14	5 August 2023	Eden Park, Auckland, New Zealand	Switzerland	2–1	5–1	2023 FIFA Women's World Cup
15	29 October 2024	Stadio Romeo Menti, Vicenza, Italy	Italy	1–0	1–1	Friendly
16	30 May 2025	Den Dreef, Leuven, Belgium	Belgium	5–0	5–1	2025 UEFA Women's Nations League

== Honours ==
Spain

- FIFA Women's World Cup: 2023
- UEFA Women's Championship runner-up: 2025
- UEFA Women's Nations League: 2023–24, 2025

Juventus

- Serie A Women's Cup: 2026

Individual

- Liga F Golden Boot: 2022–23
