= Larissa Rusek =

Austrian footballer (born 2005)

Personal information
- Date of birth: 1 January 2005 (age 21)
- Place of birth: Vienna, Austria
- Height: 1.73 m (5 ft 8 in)
- Position: Goalkeeper

Team information
- Current team: Juventus
- Number: 21

Youth career
- 2011–2022: SV Gerasdorf Stammersdorf

Senior career*
Years	Team	Apps	(Gls)
2022–2025	SV Neulengbach	58	(0)
2025–2026	1. FC Nürnberg	14	(0)
2026–	Juventus	6	(0)

International career^{‡}
2020–2022	Austria U17	15	(0)
2022–2024	Austria U19	21	(0)
2025–	Austria	0	(0)
- * Club domestic league appearances and goals as of 17 September 2026 ‡ National team caps and goals as of 13 October 2026

Larissa Rusek (born 1 January 2005) is an Austrian professional footballer who plays as a goalkeeper for Serie A club Juventus and the Austria women's national team.

== Club career ==
Rusek began playing football in 2011 with SV Gerasdorf Stammersdorf. She later joined the Austrian Football Association's women's academy in St. Pölten. In 2022, she moved to SV Neulengbach, initially on a one-year loan deal.

With SV Neulengbach, Rusek finished fourth in the ÖFB Frauen Bundesliga in the 2022–23 season and sixth in 2023–24. In voting for the 2024-25 Frauen-Bundesliga goalkeeper of the season, she placed third, behind Larissa Haidner and Carina Schlüter.

In May 2025, it was announced that Rusek would join German club 1. FC Nürnberg, and she started in goal for them in the 2025–26 Frauen-Bundesliga up to matchday 14. After half a season in Germany, she moved to Italian Serie A side Juventus in January 2026, signing a contract until 30 June 2028.

== International career ==
Rusek made 15 appearances for Austria's under-17 national team between 2020 and 2022 and 21 for the under-19s between 2022 and 2024. She was also part of Austria's squad for the 2024 FIFA U-20 Women's World Cup in Colombia.

Rusek received her first call-up to the Austria senior national team from head coach Alexander Schriebl in March 2025 for two friendly matches against the Netherlands. She was later called up again in October 2025, replacing the injured Manuela Zinsberger in the squad for Austria's 2025 UEFA Women's Nations League play-off ties against the Czech Republic.

== Honours ==
Juventus

- Serie A Women's Cup: 2026

Individual

- Serie A Women's Cup final MVP: 2026
