= Isaac Guerrero =

Spanish football coach (born 1976)

Personal information
- Full name: Isaac Oriol Guerrero Hernández
- Date of birth: 18 November 1976 (age 49)
- Place of birth: Barcelona, Spain

Team information
- Current team: Juventus Women (head coach)

Managerial career
- Years: Team
- 1999–2003: UDA Gramenet
- 2003–2009: RCD Espanyol
- 2021–2025: United States (assistant)
- 2026–: Juventus Women

Isaac Oriol Guerrero Hernández (Spanish pronunciation: [iˈsak oˈɾjol ɣeˈreɾo eɾˈnandeθ]; born 18 November 1976) is a Spanish professional football manager who is the current head coach of Serie A club Juventus Women.

== Career ==
Guerrero carrer started in 1994 when he was appointed as Head Coach and Head of Metholodogy of Catalonia club UE Sant Fost. From 1999 to 2003, he worked at UDA Gramenet as Head Coach, Players Scout, Technical Director and Head of Methodology Department. He was a non-playing staff member at RCD Espanyol between 2003 and 2009.

He returned to Gramenet in 2009–2010. In 2010, he began working at FC Barcelona where he took charge of the roles as Deputy Director, Head of Coaching of Methodology Department, and Technical Director of the Barça Football School, part of the Barça Innovation Hub & Knowledge Area. He was the director and teacher of the Barça Innovation Hub & Knowledge Area, the coordinator of the Barça Coach Development Program and the director of the Barça Coach Academy.

In 2021, having ended his experience at Barcelona, he was named Venezia FC's Academy Director & Head of Coaching while working as Mauricio Pochettino's assistant coach for United States men's national soccer team. In 2025, he took part in a Commission of Experts at the Royal Spanish Football Federation.

On 2 July 2026, he was hired as Juventus Women's head coach on a two-year contract. It was his first experience as head coach of a team. His professional debut came on 5 August, in a UEFA Champions League single-leg qualifier against Portuguese side Torreense, won 2–1. On 19 September, Guerrero won his first seasonal trophy, the Serie A Women's Cup after Juventus defeated Roma on penalty shoot-out.

== Honours ==
- Serie A Women's Cup: 2026

== Personal life ==
He graduated in Physical education at the University of Barcelona, where he obtained the award as the best student in the class in 2003. He has a master's in Global Training in Professional Football and holds a UEFA Pro license. Prior to his appointment as Juventus Women's manager, he was occasionally invited by the Italian Football Federation to hold conferences at Coverciano.

Guerrero, along with Xavier Damunt, published a book titled 'El entrenamiento sistémico basado en las emociones' ('The systemic training based on emotions').
