= Juventus FC (women) =

Italian women's association football club

Juventus
- Full name: Juventus Football Club S.p.A.
- Nicknames: [Le] Bianconere (The Black and Whites); Juventus Femminile (Female Juventus)
- Short name: Juve Women
- Founded: 1 July 2017; 9 years ago
- Ground: Stadio La Marmora-Pozzo
- Capacity: 5,827
- Owner: Exor N.V. (BIT: JUVE)
- Chairman: Gianluca Ferrero
- Head coach: Isaac Guerrero
- League: Serie A
- 2025–26: Serie A, 3rd of 12
- Website: juventus.com/women
Home colours	Away colours	Third colours

Juventus Football Club (from Latin: iuventūs, 'youth'; Italian pronunciation: [juˈvɛntus]), known for commercial purposes as Juventus Women or simply Juve Women ([ˈjuːve ˈwiːmen]), is a women's football club based in Turin, Piedmont, Italy. It was established in 2017 as the women's section of the homonymous club, following an acquisition of Cuneo's sporting licence.

The team competes in Serie A, the top flight in national football, since its debut in the 2017–18 season. They have won six league titles, four Coppa Italia titles, four Supercoppa Italiana titles, and one Serie A Women's Cup title, becoming one of the country's most successful teams. In 2020–21, they became the first Italian club (women's or men's) to accomplish a perfect season, having won all their league matches. In 2021–22, Juventus became the first team to win five consecutive league titles, and they accomplished their first domestic treble.

== History ==
=== Formation ===
In May 2017, Juventus' general manager Giuseppe Marotta announced that the club was planning to form a women's team. The women's section of Juventus was officially formed on 1 July 2017. Despite there being other women's football clubs in Turin in the past which had adopted the name "Juventus" and the black and white colours, such as the 1978-founded Juventus Torino; these have never had any connection with the men's club.

Colloquially known as Juventus Women, the team was formed after the Italian Football Federation (FIGC) allowed professional men's clubs to purchase amateur women's clubs. Already active in women's youth football since 2015, Juventus acquired the sporting license of Serie A club Cuneo, which in the meantime had dissolved, allowing the newly-formed team to directly compete in the Italian top division. Several players were signed from neighbouring Brescia, Italian champions in two of the previous four seasons and runners-up in the others.

=== Rita Guarino era (2017–2021) ===
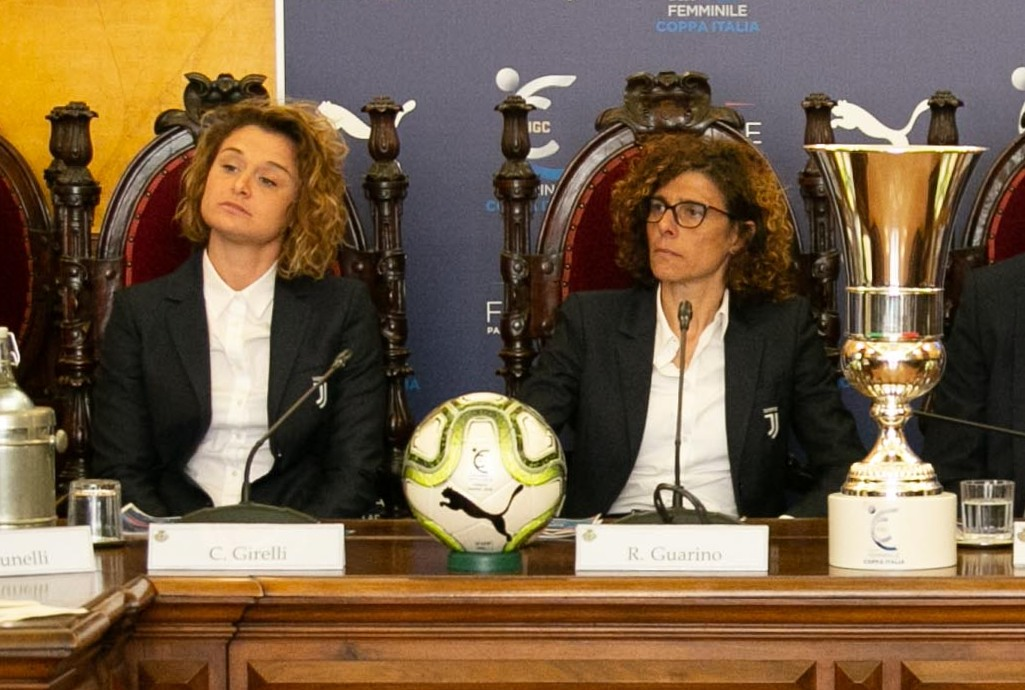
Striker Cristiana Girelli and coach Rita Guarino in 2019

During the tenure of Rita Guarino, Juventus quickly emerged as a dominating force in Italy, winning four consecutive league titles in their first four years of activity. Juventus' first game was on 27 August 2017, a 13–0 away victory over Torino in the first leg of the first round of the 2017–18 Coppa Italia; Martina Rosucci scored the club's first-ever goal. In the 2017–18 Serie A, the club was tied with Brescia for first place at 60 points. The two sides played a single-legged play-off match where, following a goalless draw after 120 minutes, Juventus beat Brescia 5–4 in a penalty shoot-out.

By having won the previous season's league title, they qualified for the 2018–19 UEFA Champions League; they lost 3–2 on aggregate to Brøndby in the round of 32. In the 2018–19 season, Juventus achieved the domestic double, winning their second Serie A title and first Coppa Italia. In 2019–20, Juventus won both the Supercoppa Italiana, their first title, and their third consecutive league title. (Note: The league was suspended six matchdays in advance due to the COVID-19 pandemic in Italy; on 8 June 2020, the suspension became definitive and no title was awarded. Nonetheless, on 25 June, FIGC assigned the scudetto to first-placed Juventus.) In only two years, the team won all the trophies of Italian women's football.

In the 2020–21 season, Juventus won their second Supercoppa Italiana, and their fourth-consecutive league title, becoming only the second club to achieve this streak after Torres in 2013. They finished the 2020–21 Serie A winning all 22 league matches, becoming the first team in the Italian women's top flight to accomplish a perfect season.

=== Joe Montemurro era (2021–2024) ===
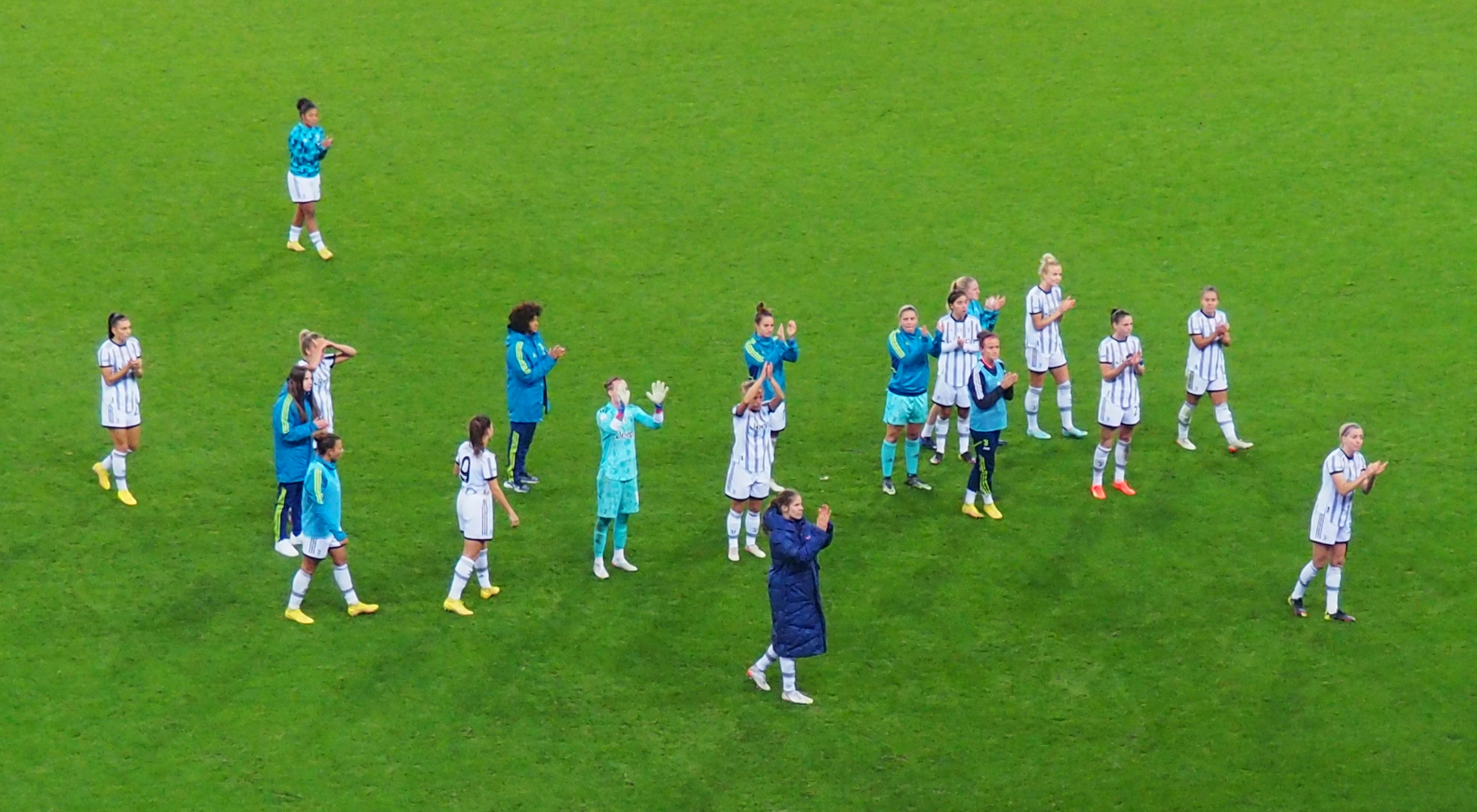
Juventus players greeting their supporters after losing the 2022 Supercoppa Italiana

After four seasons at the club, Guarino left Juventus. She was replaced by former Melbourne City and Arsenal coach Joe Montemurro ahead of the 2021–22 season. Juventus won their fifth-consecutive league title, establishing a record streak in Italian women's football. They also finished among the best eight teams in Europe, reaching the quarterfinals of the 2021–22 UEFA Champions League. Having also won the Coppa Italia and Supercoppa Italiana that season, their second and third respectively, Juventus achieved their first domestic treble.

In the 2022–23 season, Juventus lost the 2022 Supercoppa Italiana to Roma in the penalty shootout. Roma also ended their run of five consecutive league titles. Their sole seasonal trophy was the Coppa Italia, after defeating Roma 1–0 thanks to Barbara Bonansea's stoppage-time goal. Juventus started the 2023–24 season with the early elimination from the Champions League at the hands of Eintracht Frankfurt after penalty shoot-outs in the first qualifying round in September. After a 1–0 defeat to Fiorentina in the first leg of the Coppa Italia semi-finals and a nine-point gap from league leaders Roma, Juventus announced Montemurro's dismissal with immediate effect on 6 March 2024. During Montemurro's tenure, Juventus won one league title, two Coppa Italia titles, and two Supercoppa Italiana titles. He was replaced for the rest of the season by his assistant coach, Giuseppe Zappella, who brought Juventus to second place in the league behind Roma, who won their second league title in a row.

=== Recent years (2024–present) ===
On 22 May 2024, Juventus announced that Massimiliano Canzi had agreed to become Juventus' coach on a two-year contract. In their first season under Canzi, Juventus immediately achieved the domestic double: they won the scudetto after a three-year hiatus, and they won the Coppa Italia by defeating Roma 4–0. Juventus opened the 2025–26 season by winning the first edition of the Serie A Women's Cup after beating again the Giallorosse 3–2 on 27 September 2025. In July 2026, Canzi was taken over from by Spaniard Isaac Guerrero, who took charge of his first role as head coach in his entire career. In two years, Canzi had brought to Turin each of all trophies available in Italy: one Serie A league, one Coppa Italia, one Supercoppa Italiana and one Serie A Women's Cup.

== Season by season ==
Season	League			Coppa Italia	Supercoppa Italiana	Serie A Women's Cup	UEFA Champions League
Season	Tier	Division	Position	Coppa Italia	Supercoppa Italiana	Serie A Women's Cup	UEFA Champions League
2017–18	1	Serie A	Champions	Quarter-finals	N/A	Not played	N/A
2018–19	1	Serie A	Champions	Champions	Final	Not played	Round of 32
2019–20	1	Serie A	Champions	Not concluded	Champions	Not played	Round of 32
2020–21	1	Serie A	Champions	Semi-finals	Champions	Not played	Round of 32
2021–22	1	Serie A	Champions	Champions	Champions	Not played	Quarter-finals
2022–23	1	Serie A	Runners-up	Champions	Final	Not played	Group stage
2023–24	1	Serie A	Runners-up	Semi-finals	Champions	Not played	First round (Note: Final)
2024–25	1	Serie A	Champions	Champions	N/A	Not played	Group stage
2025–26	1	Serie A	3rd	Runners-up	Champions	Champions	Knock-out playoffs
2026–27	1	Serie A				Champions	

== Stadiums ==
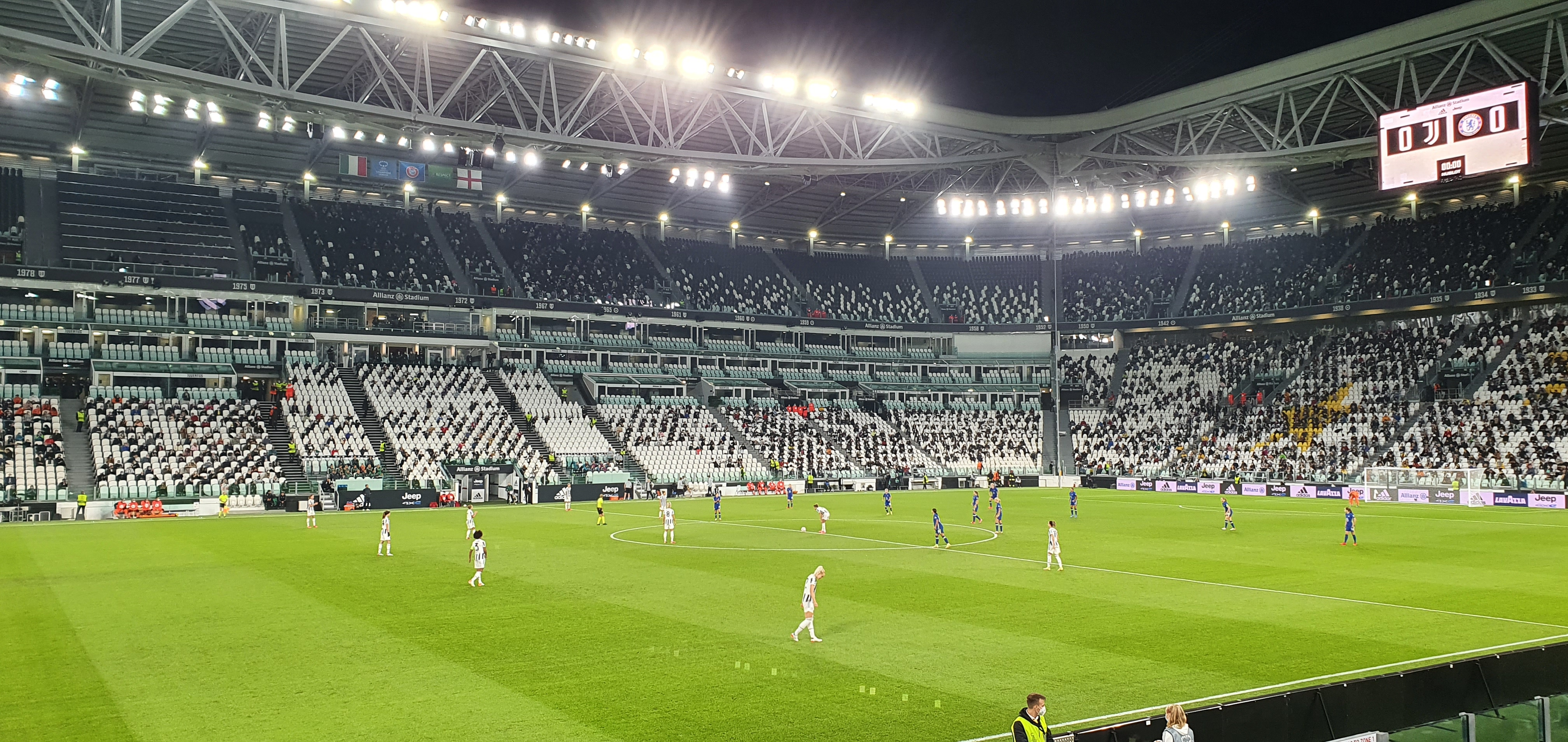
The Juventus Stadium before the kickoff of a UEFA Women's Champions League match against Chelsea in 2021

Until 2023, Juventus' home ground was the 498-capacity Campo Ale & Ricky ("Ale & Ricky Field"), situated inside the Juventus Training Center in Vinovo. Thereafter, Juventus have been playing at the Stadio La Marmora-Pozzo in Biella. For their UEFA Women's Champions League matches (excluding qualifying rounds), Juventus have been using the men's team's Juventus Stadium in Turin since 2020. Juventus played their home matches of the 2018–19 and 2019–20 Champions League seasons respectively at the Stadio Silvio Piola in Novara, and at the Stadio Giuseppe Moccagatta in Alessandria. (Note: The Stadio Giuseppe Moccagatta was also used for the Champions League second qualifying round against HB Køge in 2022.)

On 24 March 2019, Juventus played an important match against Fiorentina at the Juventus Stadium, in which tickets were free; Juventus won 1–0, and the match was attended by 39,000 people, a record number of spectators in a women's football match in Italy. During their first season in 2017–18, Juventus trained at the Sisport center in Turin. Starting from 2018, Juventus has been training at the Juventus Training Center.

== Youth sector ==
In July 2015, Juventus formed their under-12 team following a partnership with Turin-based club San Bernando Luserno, after FIGC decided that every Serie A club had to have a women's team. By 2022, Juventus had already had seven youth teams (from U9 to U19 level). In November 2022, Juventus Women's Team Director Stefano Braghin announced a collaboration with Bari-based club Pink Bari's youth set-up.

The under-19 team has won the Women's Torneo di Viareggio thrice (in 2019, 2020, and 2025), and reached and lost five league championship finals in six years (2018, 2020, 2021, 2022, and 2023), (Note: The 2018 loss came against Pink Bari, while the four consecutive defeates from 2020 to 2023 came against Roma.) with the addition of a third place in 2019, after defeating Pink Bari 4–2 in the third-place playoff. They ultimately won the championship in 2025 after defeating rivals Inter Milan 2–0 in the final. The under-17 team has reached two league championship finals, they won in 2019, and lost in 2022, and lost again on 2024. The under-15s have won two scudetti (in 2019 and 2022). Juventus U12 have won twice the national phase of the Danone Nations Cup, a prestigious international competition among under-12 teams, in 2017 and 2022.

== Players ==
=== Current squad ===
As of 26 September 2026.

Note: Flags indicate national team as defined under FIFA eligibility rules; some limited exceptions apply. Players may hold more than one non-FIFA nationality.

No.	Pos.	Nation	Player
1	GK	NED	Daniëlle de Jong
3	DF	ESP	Estela Carbonell
4	DF	FRA	Kysha Sylla
6	MF	ITA	Eva Schatzer
7	FW	POR	Ana Capeta
8	DF	ITA	Martina Rosucci
9	FW	ITA	Chiara Beccari
14	MF	ESP	Júlia Bartel
15	FW	ITA	Annamaria Serturini
16	MF	NED	Danique Noordman
17	MF	NOR	Emma Stølen Godø
19	MF	ITA	Matilde Pavan
20	FW	ESP	Alba Redondo

No.	Pos.	Nation	Player
21	GK	AUT	Larissa Rusek
22	FW	JPN	Remina Chiba
23	DF	ITA	Cecilia Salvai
26	FW	FRA	Léa Khelifi
27	DF	ITA	Federica D'Auria
28	FW	FRA	Ornella Graziani (on loan from Paris Saint-Germain)
29	MF	POR	Tatiana Pinto
30	MF	JPN	Manaka Hayashi
40	GK	ITA	Anna Mallardi
46	MF	ESP	Cristina Librán
71	DF	ITA	Martina Lenzini
77	FW	ESP	Amaiur Sarriegi

=== Out on loan ===
Note: Flags indicate national team as defined under FIFA eligibility rules; some limited exceptions apply. Players may hold more than one non-FIFA nationality.

No.	Pos.	Nation	Player
—	GK	ITA	Emma Mustafic (on loan at Como 1907)
—	GK	ITA	Alessia Capelletti (on loan at Genoa CFC Women)
—	DF	ITA	Sofia Bertucci (on loan at Frosinone)
—	DF	ITA	Martina Cocino (on loan at Aarau)
—	DF	ITA	Azzurra Gallo (on loan at Toulouse FC)
—	DF	ITA	Martina Pizzolato (on loan at Lumezzane)
—	MF	ITA	Manuela Sciabica (on loan at SS Lazio)
—	MF	ITA	Greta Bellagente (on loan at Lumezzane)
—	MF	ITA	Alice Giai (on loan at Bologna)
—	MF	ITA	Maddalena Nava (on loan at Vincenza)
—	MF	ITA	Giorgia Termentini (on loan at Catania)
—	MF	ITA	Marta Zamboni (on loan at FC Como)

No.	Pos.	Nation	Player
—	FW	ITA	Cecilia Cavallin (on loan at Parma)
—	FW	SVK	Michaela Martišková (on loan at RSC Anderlecht)
—	FW	POL	Magdalena Sobal (on loan at Servette Chênois)
—	FW	ITA	Eleonora Ferraresi (on loan at Bologna)
—	FW	AUS	Annalise Rasmussen (on loan at Toulouse FC (women))
—	MF	ESP	Maria Carvajal (on loan at SD Eibar)
—	FW	ITA	Giogria Berveglieri (on loan at Frosinone)
—	FW	ITA	Cristiana Girelli (on loan at Bay FC)
—	FW	ITA	Barbara Bonansea (on loan at San Diego Wave)
—	FW	SUI	Emilie Mece (on loan at Napoli)
—	MF	USA	Abi Brighton (on loan at AC Milan)

== Managerial history ==
Below is a list of Juventus Women coaches from 2017 until the present day.

Name	Nationality	Years
Rita Guarino	Italy	2017–2021
Joe Montemurro	Australia	2021–2024
Giuseppe Zappella	Italy	2024
Paolo Beruatto	Italy	2024
Massimiliano Canzi	Italy	2024–2026
Isaac Guerrero	Spain	2026–

== Honours ==
Below is a list of Juventus Women trophies from 2017 until the present day.

- Serie A
  - Winners (6): 2017–18, 2018–19, 2019–20, 2020–21, 2021–22, 2024–25
- Coppa Italia
  - Winners (4): 2018–19, 2021–22, 2022–23, 2024–25
- Supercoppa Italiana
  - Winners (5): 2019, 2020, 2021, 2023, 2025
- Serie A Women's Cup
  - Winners (2): 2025, 2026

== Club statistics and records ==
Juventus holds the record for consecutive Serie A victories (5), between 2018 and 2023, and the most scudetti in the three-point era (6), ex aequo with Torres. In the 2021–22 season, Juventus became the first-ever Italian team in both men's and women's football to accomplish a perfect season with 22 league wins out of 22. In addition, Juventus became the team to score the most league points (66), the most seasonal goals (75), and the best goal-difference (+65) in a single 12-team league. From 16 February 2020 to 16 January 2022, Juventus achieved the longest series of league matches won consecutively (36). Furthermore, Juventus went unbeaten for 54 Serie A matches in–a–row, from 14 April 2019 to 27 February 2022. From 2 January 2020 to 16 December 2023, Juventus always scored at least one goal for 82 consecutive league matches.

== Contribution to national teams ==
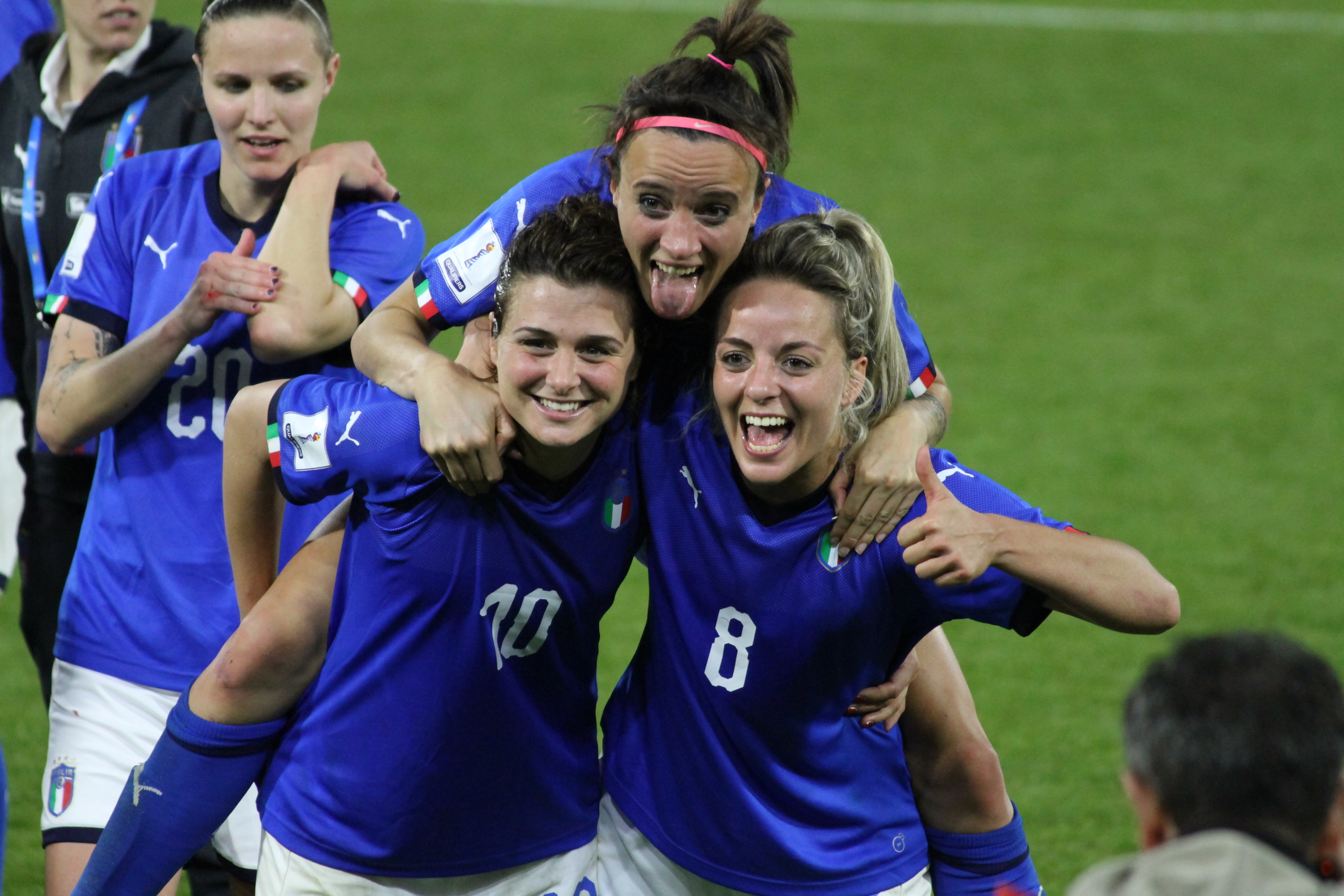
From left to right: Juventus Women's Girelli, Barbara Bonansea, and Martina Rosucci celebrating for Italy national team (2018)

Ahead of the 2019 FIFA Women's World Cup, Italy coach Milena Bertolini called up eight Juventus players—including captain Sara Gama. Six of them were regularly fielded as starters. Italy reached the quarter-finals, their best-ever result in the competition. The 2022 Algarve Cup Final saw nine Juventus players being fielded. Seven were Italy's, namely Bonansea, Caruso, Valentina Cernoia, Gama, Cristiana Girelli, Martina Lenzini, and Rosucci, while two Sweden's, namely Lina Hurtig and Amanda Nildén. Ahead of the UEFA Women's Euro 2025, where Italy would reach the semifinals, Italy's coach Andrea Soncin called up eight Bianconere players: Valentina Bergamaschi, Boattini, Bonansea, Sofia Cantore, Girelli, Lenzini, Cecilia Salvai, and Eva Schatzer.

== Awards ==
Three Juventus players have been inducted into the Italian Hall of Fame.

Arsenal W.F.C. players inducted into the English Football Hall of Fame
Ind.	Name	Nationality	Pos.	Years	Ref.
2019	Sara Gama	Italy	DF	2017–2025	
2021	Barbara Bonansea	Italy	FW	2017–pres.	
2022	Cristiana Girelli	Italy	FW	2018–2026	

== Media ==
On 21 September 2026, ESPN–owned Disney+ released a documentary, created by Juventus Creator Lab, titled "Becoming Her: Prima di diventare grandi" ("Becoming Her: Before becoming great."). Narrated by singer Francesca Michielin, it focuses on the lives of three young players, Sofia Cholovskaya, Samantha Lee e Anna Copelli, respectively traning at the Juventus Academies in Al Khobar, Los Angeles and Vinovo.

== See also ==
- List of unbeaten football club seasons
- List of women's association football clubs
- List of women's football clubs in Italy
