= Canzi =

Canzi is a surname. Notable people with the surname include:

- Caterina Canzi (1805–1890), Austrian-born soprano
- Massimiliano Canzi (born 1966), Italian football coach
