= Louise Eriksen =

Danish footballer (born 1995)

Personal information
- Full name: Louise Dannemann Eriksen
- Date of birth: 11 September 1995 (age 31)
- Place of birth: Kolding, Denmark
- Height: 1.67 m (5 ft 6 in)
- Position: Midfielder

Team information
- Current team: Como
- Number: 6

Youth career
- 2010–2015: KoldingQ

Senior career*
| Years | Team | Apps | (Gls) |
| 2015–2022 | Kolding IF | 253 | (11) |
| 2022–2025 | Lazio | 28 | (0) |
| 2025– | Como | | |

International career^{‡}
| 2011 | Denmark U16 | 2 | (0) |
- * Club domestic league appearances and goals as of 16 May 2025 ‡ National team caps and goals as of 14:10, 3 September 2026 (UTC)

Louise Dannemann Eriksen (born 11 September 1995) is a Danish professional footballer who plays as a Midfielder for Serie A club Como.

== International career ==
Eriksen appeared for the Denmark national under-16 team in 2011. She was selected for an international friendly match with the Danish national team against Finland in April 2017. She hasn't made an official debut for the Denmark or been part of the team since.

== Personal life ==
Eriksen is the younger sister of the Danish international footballer Christian Eriksen.
