= Margherita Monnecchi =

Italian footballer

Personal information
- Date of birth: 6 November 2001 (age 24)
- Position: Forward

Team information
- Current team: Fiorentina

Senior career*
Years	Team	Apps	(Gls)
2018–	Fiorentina	52	(1)
2023–2024	→ Como (loan)	25	(1)
2024–2025	→ SD Eibar (loan)	27	(2)
2025–2026	→ Lazio Women (loan)	27	(2)

International career
2023	Italy U23	2	(0)
- * Club domestic league appearances and goals

Margherita Monnecchi (born 6 November 2001) is an Italian footballer who plays as offensive midfielder/forward for Fiorentina.
