= Liga F Golden Boot =

Annual award for the top scorer in Spain's top women's football (soccer) league

- Awarded for: The top goalscorer in a given Liga F season
- Country: Spain
- Presented by: Royal Spanish Football Federation
- First award: 2005
- Currently held by: (Spain) Clàudia Pina (2025–26)

Highlights
- Most wins: (Spain) Jenni Hermoso (5)

The Liga F Golden Boot is an annual football award presented to the leading goalscorer each season in Liga F, the top tier of women's football in Spain. The winner of the Golden Boot generally also receives the Pichichi Trophy, presented by the sport newspaper Marca. Jenni Hermoso has won the Golden Boot a record 5 times. Charlyn Corral of Mexico was the first non-Spanish player to win the award.

== Winners ==
Season	Player(s)	Club(s)	Goals	Ref
2004–05	(Spain) Marta Cubí	Espanyol	32	
2005–06	(Spain) Auxiliadora Jiménez	Híspalis	29	
2006–07	(Spain) Adriana Martín	Espanyol	30	
2007–08	(Spain) Natalia Pablos	Rayo Vallecano	24	
2008–09	(Spain) Erika Vázquez	Athletic Bilbao	32	
2009–10	(Spain) Adriana Martín	Rayo Vallecano	35	
2010–11	(Spain) Verónica Boquete	Espanyol	39	
2011–12	(Spain) Sonia Bermúdez	Barcelona	38	
2012–13	(Spain) Sonia Bermúdez	Barcelona	27	
2012–13	(Spain) Natalia Pablos	Rayo Vallecano	27	
2013–14	(Spain) Sonia Bermúdez	Barcelona	28	
2014–15	(Spain) Sonia Bermúdez	Barcelona	22	
2014–15	(Spain) Adriana Martín	Levante	22	
2015–16	(Spain) Jenni Hermoso	Barcelona	24	
2016–17	(Spain) Jenni Hermoso	Barcelona	35	
2017–18	(Mexico) Charlyn Corral	Levante	24	
2018–19	(Spain) Jenni Hermoso	Atlético Madrid	24	
2019–20	(Spain) Jenni Hermoso	Barcelona	23	
2020–21	(Spain) Jenni Hermoso	Barcelona	31	
2021–22	(Nigeria) Asisat Oshoala	Barcelona	20	
2021–22	(Brazil) Geyse	Madrid CFF	20	
2022–23	(Spain) Alba Redondo	Levante UD	27	
2023–24	(Norway) Caroline Graham Hansen	Barcelona	21	
2024–25	(Poland) Ewa Pajor	Barcelona	25	
2025–26	(Spain) Clàudia Pina	Barcelona	21	

=== Players with multiple wins ===
Player	Wins	Seasons
(Spain) Jenni Hermoso	5	2015–16, 2016–17, 2018–19, 2019–20, 2020–21
(Spain) Sonia Bermúdez	4	2011–12, 2012–13, 2013–14, 2014–15
(Spain) Adriana Martín	3	2006–07, 2009–10, 2014–15
(Spain) Natalia Pablos	2	2007–08, 2012–13

=== Wins by club ===
Rank	Club	Wins	Seasons
1	Barcelona	12	2011–12, 2012–13, 2013–14, 2014–15, 2015–16, 2016–17, 2019–20, 2020–21, 2021–22, 2023–24, 2024–25, 2025–26
2	Espanyol	3	2004–05, 2006–07, 2010–11
2	Rayo Vallecano	3	2007–08, 2009–10, 2012–13
2	Levante	3	2014–15, 2017–18, 2022–23
5	CD Hispalis	1	2005–06
5	Athletic Club	1	2008–09
5	Atlético Madrid	1	2018–19
5	Madrid CFF	1	2021–22

== See also ==
- List of sports awards honoring women
- Copa de la Reina de Fútbol
- Supercopa de España Femenina
