= Carmen Menayo =

Spanish footballer (born 1998)

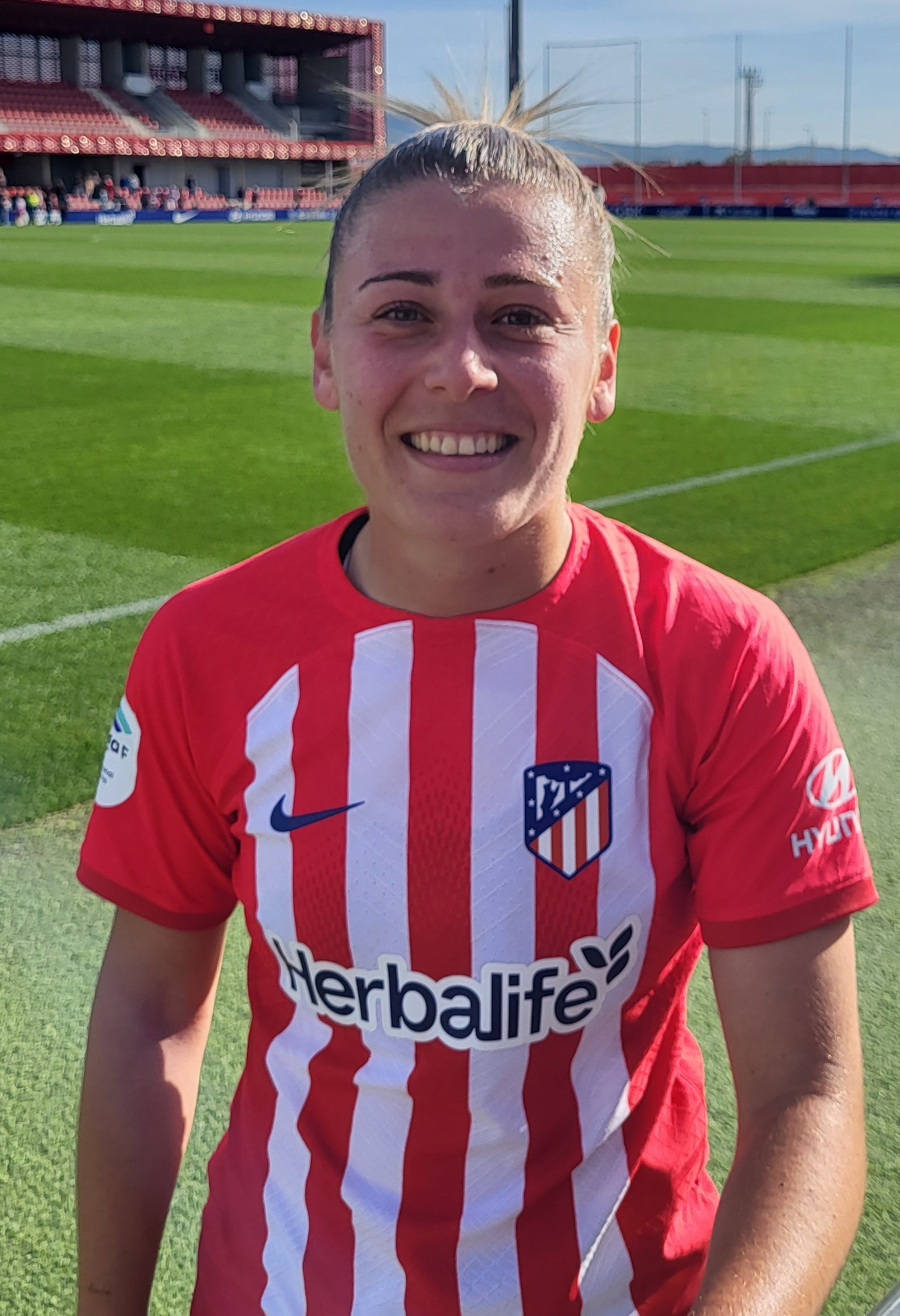

Personal information
- Full name: Carmen Menayo Montero
- Date of birth: 14 April 1998 (age 28)
- Place of birth: Puebla de la Calzada, Spain
- Height: 1.70 m (5 ft 7 in)
- Position: Defender

Team information
- Current team: Como 1907

Youth career
- Santa Teresa

Senior career*
Years	Team	Apps	(Gls)
2014–2016	Santa Teresa	57	(1)
2016–2026	Atlético Madrid	142	(5)
2026–	Como 1907	0	(0)

International career^{‡}
2011–2012	Spain U16		
2013–2015	Spain U17	22	(2)
2015–2017	Spain U19	22	(4)
2016–2018	Spain U20	10	(1)
- * Club domestic league appearances and goals as of 15 May 2022 ‡ National team caps and goals as of 25 October 2020

Carmen Menayo Montero (born 14 April 1998) is a Spanish professional footballer who plays as a defender for the Serie A club Como 1907. Primarily a centre-back, she has played in the left-back position, although she has also played as a winger and forward. On the international level, she played more than 50 matches with the youth levels of the Spanish national team.

== Club career ==
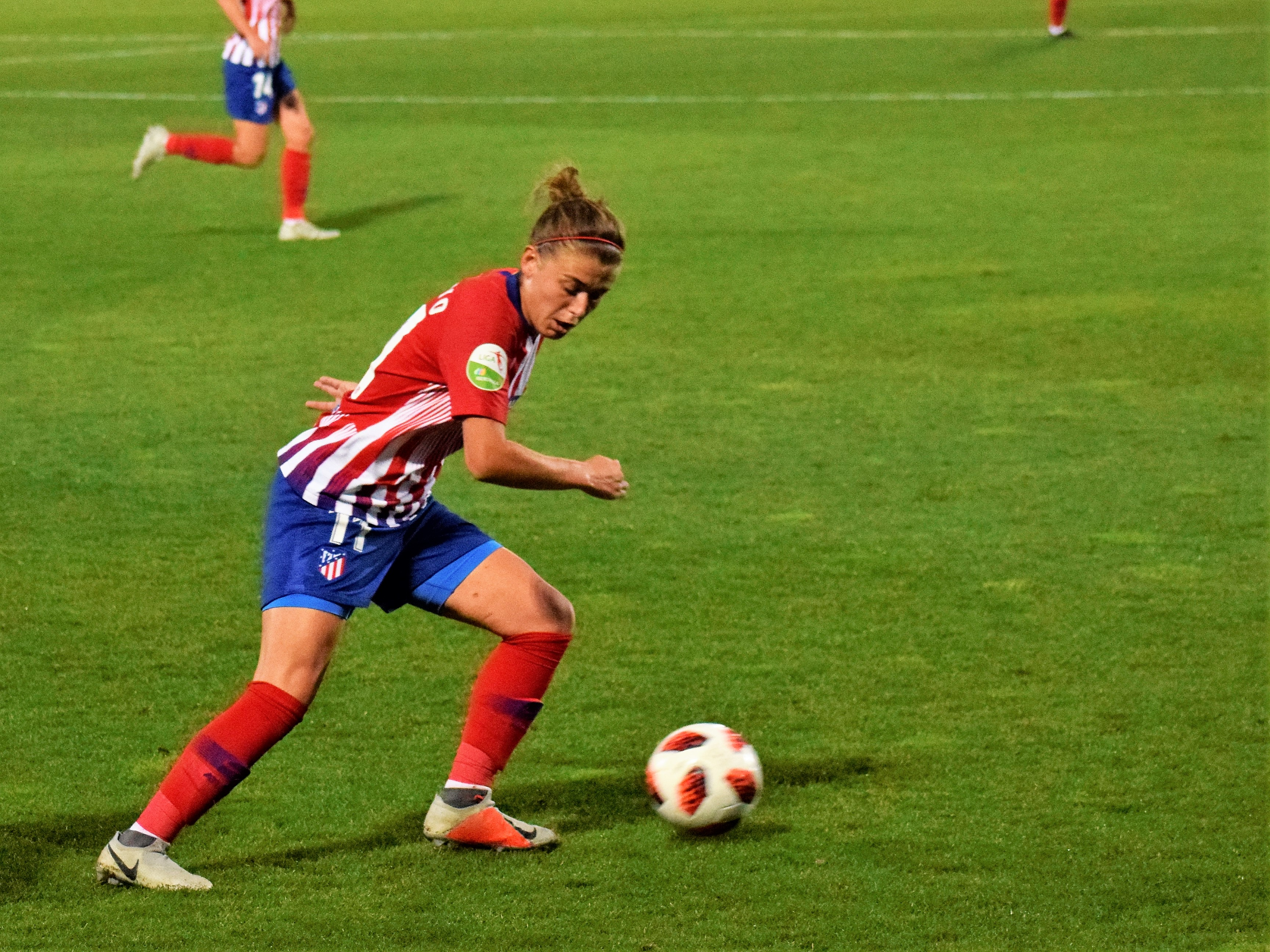
Carmen Menayo in 2018

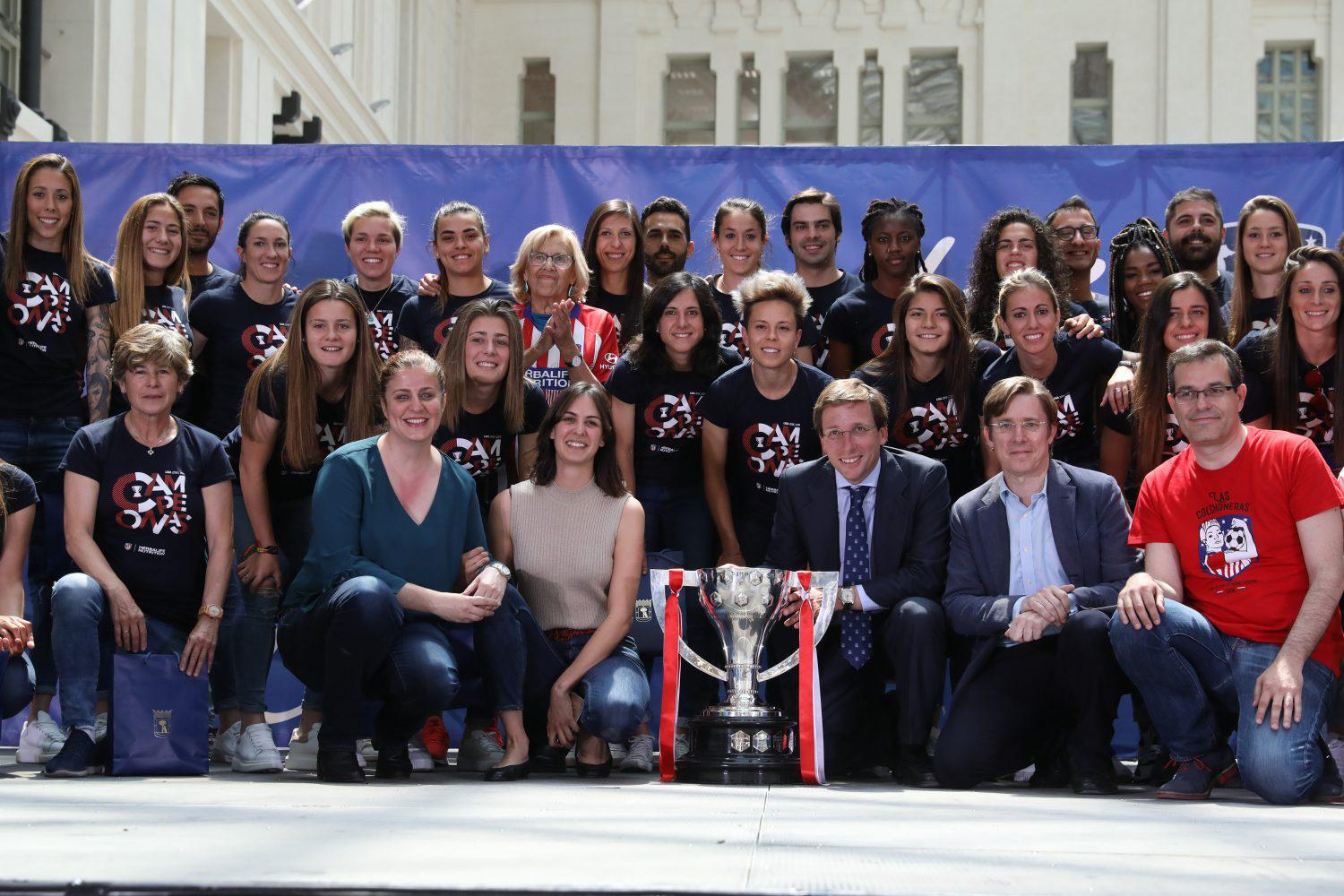
The mayoress receives the team of Atlético Madrid Femenino, winner of the 2019 Liga Iberdola

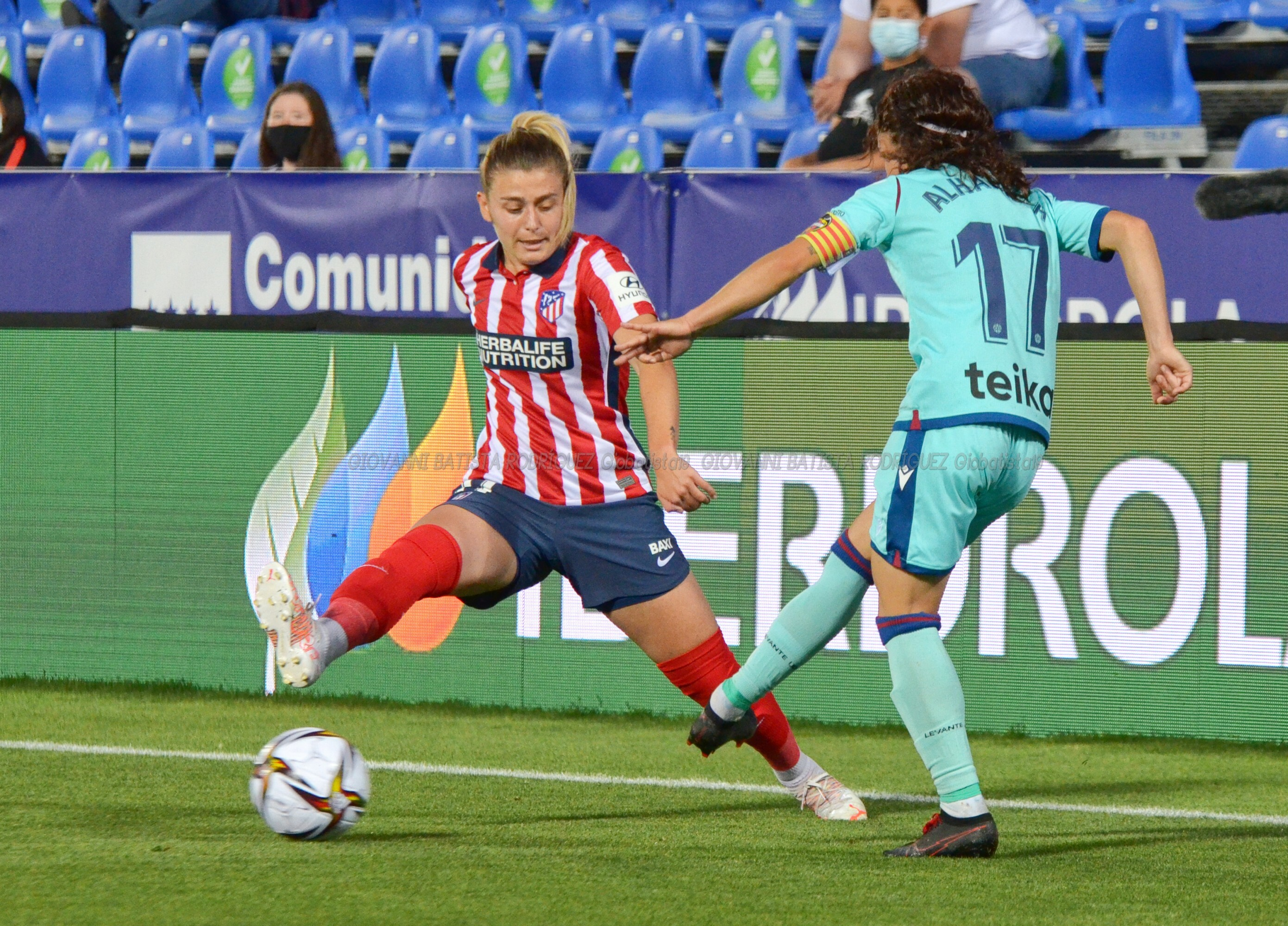
Carmen Menayo with Atlético Madrid Femenino

=== Santa Teresa ===
On 19 June 2014, Menayo signed for Santa Teresa, which had just been promoted to the Primera División. She made her debut in the Primera División on 7 September 2014, at the age of 16, where her team lost to Transportes Alcaine by 3 to 1. She was a starter throughout the season and only lost one game per call with the Spain Under-17 team and scored a goal. Although Menayo came to the team as a left winger or forward, she was delaying her position to the side, and with the injury of Paralejo, manager Juan Carlos Antúnez, reconverted her to central defender. The team finished the season in ninth position, achieving the goal of maintaining category.

In the 2015-16 season, Menayo continued to start and only missed two games. Santa Teresa remained in the Primera División by finishing in eleventh position.

=== Atlético Madrid ===
==== 2016–17 season ====
Menayo always wanted to study physiotherapy in Madrid and in 2016, after rejecting several offers from other clubs, she had the opportunity to play for Atlético Madrid, with which she could complement her football practice with her studies. On 5 July 2016, Atlético Madrid announced that they officially signed Menayo.

Menayo made her debut with Las Rojiblancas on 3 September 2016 when she replaced Silvia Meseguer in the 85th minute of the first league match against Rayo Vallecano, which ended with an 2-0 Atlético victory. On 7 May 2017, she scored her first goal with Atleti, in the league game that her club beat Granadilla by 3-0. That season, she played 21 league games, contributing to the club's first Primera División championship after its refoundation. According to Menayo, the key to success was being united as a group and regularity. She also started in the three matches of the Copa de la Reina, where they were runners-up after being defeated 4-1 by Barcelona.

==== 2017–18 season ====
In the 2017–18 season, manager Ángel Villacampa converted Menayo from left-back to centre-back, accompanying Andrea Pereira in the axis of defense. She played 26 of the 30 league games, in addition to making her Champions League debut on 4 October 2017 with a 0-3 defeat against Wolfsburg. Atlético Madrid won the league title again that season and finished runner-up in the Copa de la Reina.

==== 2018–19 season ====
In the 2018-19 season, Villacampa was replaced by José Luis Sánchez Vera who reverted Menayo's position to left-back. She played 26 of the 30 League games, in addition to playing the 4 Champions League games and the 3 Copa de la Reina games as a starter. On matchday 13, she scored a goal for the squad from outside the area against Espanyol. On 7 March 2019, she was selected among the five finalists in her position for the Fútbol Draft award. On 5 May, Menayo won her third league championship, giving an assist to Ángela Sosa. She played in the final of the Copa de la Reina tournament in which Atlético lost to Real Sociedad.

==== 2019–20 season ====
Menayo began the 2019–20 season sharing minutes with newcomer Kylie Strom, but after the resignation of José Luis Sánchez Vera and the arrival of Pablo López in October, she became the undisputed starter. She was named player of the day 12 by the newspaper Marca and by the sponsor of the tournament, Iberdrola. She was also chosen as the best player of the first round by popular vote. She played 18 league games and gave 4 assists before the season was ended early due to the COVID-19 pandemic and Atleti was runner-up in the league. She played in the semifinal of the Supercopa in which they were defeated by Barcelona and the round of 16 match of the Copa de la Reina against Betis in which the Sevillanas went through after winning the penalty shootout. In the Champions League, she played four of the five games the team played until they lost in the quarterfinals against Barcelona.

==== 2020–21 season ====
In the 2020-21 preseason, Menayo injured her ACL. In December she was named the team's third captain, a captaincy that she held until the beginning of the following season. She returned to the pitch in May 2021 That year, Atlético Madrid had finished in fourth place in the league standings in which they won the Supercopa, a first for Menayo.

==== 2021–22 season ====
In the 2021-22 season, Menayo was one of the most used players, especially since Amanda Frisbie's injury. On 13 December, she signed a four-year extension until 2025. In January 2022, the commemorative plaque was installed on the promenade of the club's legends, which certifies having played more than 100 games for Atlético Madrid.

==== 2022–23 season ====
In the 2022-23 season, Menayo was given back the captain's stripes, being the second captain behind Lola Gallardo. Although she started the season as a starter, she suffered a knee sprain for which she was out due to two months. After recovering, she regained her spot in the centre-back position. She scored a goal in discount that gave them the league victory against Athletic Club, and she was chosen the best Atlético Madrid player for the month of February. The team was not regular during the season and changed managers, ending up in fourth position in the league. In the Copa de la Reina, Atlético qualified solidly for the final, in which they faced Real Madrid at Estadio Municipal de Butarque in Leganés and Menayo started. The team won the trophy in the penalty shootout after coming back from 2-0 down in added time.

==== Later years ====
In the 2023–24 season, Menayo remained a regular starter and surpassed 200 appearances for the club. In January, Atlético Madrid were eliminated in the Supercopa semi-final, and in February, they had several direct league matches in which they did not achieve good results and fell further behind the top positions. Menayo was chosen as the team's best player in February. Following the Copa del Rey semi-final elimination and a poor league result, Manolo Cano was dismissed and replaced by the coach of the reserve team, Arturo Ruiz. They strung together several consecutive victories and finally achieved the objective of qualifying for the Women's Champions League after finishing third in Liga F. On the last matchday of the league season, she had to leave the pitch injured due to a rupture of the anterior cruciate ligament graft and an associated lateral meniscus injury in her right knee.

Menayo missed the entire 2024–25 season recovering from an injury sustained at the end of the previous campaign. Atlético Madrid, managed that year by Víctor Martín, qualified for the Champions League on the final matchday and reached the final of the Copa de la Reina, although they were eliminated in the qualifying round of the Women's Champions League and in the semi-final of the Supercopa. She returned to official competition on 31 August 2025, in the first league match of the 2025–26 season. On 22 May, Atlético Madrid announced that Menayo would leave the club upon the expiry of her contract at the end of the season.

=== Como 1907 ===
On 16 July 2026, Como 1907 announced that Menayo signed for the club.

== International career ==
Menayo debuted with the U-17 national team on 24 March 2013 in the second round match for the UEFA Women's Under-17 Championship against Finland, in which Spain won 3 goals to 0. Menayo replaced Nahikari García in the 73rd minute. She also played the other two games in this phase as a substitute and they qualified for the final round. Later she was called up to play the final round of the UEFA Women's Under-17 Championship that was held in June 2013 in Nyon, Switzerland. She played the two championship games as a substitute, in which the team lost in the semifinals on penalties to Sweden and finished in third place by beating Belgium 4-0.

Menayo participated with Spain for the 2014 UEFA Women's Under-17 Championship, which was held in December and was the qualifier for the 2014 FIFA U-17 Women's World Cup. She was called up for the final round of the championship, in which she only participated as a substitute in the last minutes of two games. Spain finished the runner-up position. This result led the team to qualify for the World Cup in Costa Rica. She was called up again for this championship. Although in the group stage she only played 20 minutes as a substitute against New Zealand, in the knockout rounds she started in all the games, in the quarterfinals against Nigeria, in the semifinal against Italy and in the final against Japan, in which Spain lost to them.

Menayo continued to be a starter in U-17 squad. She played the three Elite Round matches valid to qualify for the 2015 UEFA Women's Under-17 Championship, and scored her first international goal against Russia on 22 March 2015. In the final phase of the UEFA U-17 Championship, she started in all the games, although manager Pedro López converted Menayo's position so that she could play as a winger, and scored the fourth of the five goals in the final that they won against Switzerland, in addition to giving three assists to her teammates.

After winning the 2015 UEFA U-17 Championship, Menayo began playing in the under-19 category. She made her debut with the national squad in a friendly against Slovakia on 16 September. Two days later, she scored her first two goals in the category in a friendly against England. She started both matches in the qualifying phase of the 2016 UEFA Women's Under-19 Championship and in the final phase, which was held in Slovakia. She was in the starting eleven of the five games that the team played, in which Spain lost to France in the final. She was inducted into the team of the tournament.

Moving up to the U-20 category, Menayo was called up again to play in the 2016 FIFA U-20 Women's World Cup. She played every minute until Spain lost to North Korea at extra time in the quarterfinals.

In 2017, Menayo continued to start both in the qualifying phase and in the final phase of the 2017 UEFA Women's Under-19 Championship. She played every minute of the final phase in which Spain won the championship by beating France in the final. Menayo gave two assists in the game, the second gave the team victory in the last minute of the game in a free kick that her teammate and friend Patricia Guijarro finished off with a header. In addition, she was again selected to the team of the tournament.

Menayo played her third world championship in 2018, when she was called up to play in the U-20 Women's World Cup in France. Again, she started in all the championship games, and scored the only goal in the group stage victory against Japan. Spain lost in the final when they faced Japan again, a team they could not beat this time, by a score of three goals to one.

On 25 September 2018, Menayo was called up to participate in some training sessions with the senior squad.

== In other media ==
In the summer of 2018, the Extremaduran Football Federation produced a documentary about Menayo's career, which was premiered at the Casa de la Cultura in Puebla de la Calzada and which was screened in March 2019 at the Ateneo de Madrid promoted by the Peña Las Colchoneras within the program dedicated to the boom of women's football.

== Personal life ==
Menayo originally studied physiotherapy but changed her studies to a degree in physical activity and sports sciences. She had a relationship with her fellow Atlético Madrid teammate Lola Gallardo.

== Honours ==
=== Club ===
Atlético Madrid

- Primera División: 2016–17, 2017–18, 2018-19
- Supercopa de España: 2020-21
- Copa de la Reina: 2022–23

=== International ===
Spain

- UEFA Women's Under-17 Championship: Winner 2015
- UEFA Women's Under-19 Championship: Winner 2017
