= Stephanie Öhrström =

Swedish footballer (born 1987)

Stéphanie Öhrström
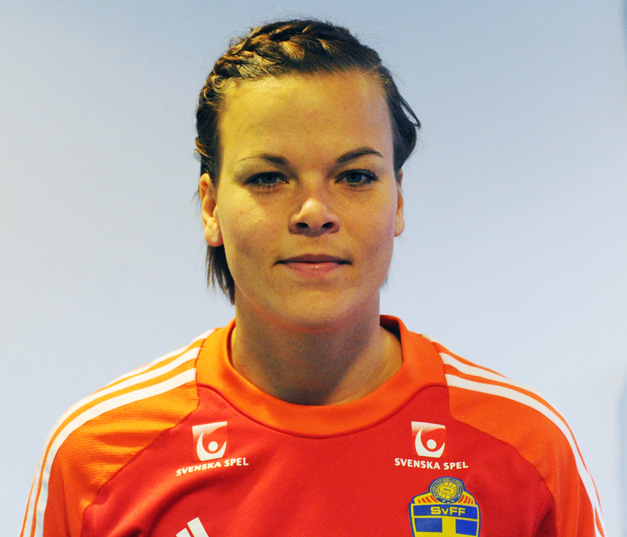
- Öhrström training with Sweden in November 2013

Personal information
- Full name: Stéphanie Öhrström
- Date of birth: 12 January 1987 (age 39)
- Place of birth: Trelleborg, Sweden
- Height: 1.68 m (5 ft 6 in)
- Position: Goalkeeper

Senior career*
Years	Team	Apps	(Gls)
	Husie		(0)
2007–2009	Malmö		(0)
2010	Jitex	8	(0)
2011–2016	AGSM Verona	133	(2)
2016–2021	Fiorentina	68	(0)
2021–2022	Lazio	19	(0)
2022–2024	AS Roma	3	(0)
- * Club domestic league appearances and goals

Stéphanie Öhrström (born 12 January 1987) is a Swedish football goalkeeper. She has previously played in Italy's Serie A for AS Roma, SS Lazio Women 2015, Fiorentina and AGSM Verona. Before moving to Italy, she played for LdB Malmö and Jitex BK in the Damallsvenskan.

== Honours ==
Roma

- Serie A: 2022–23
- Supercoppa Italiana: 2022
