= Giuseppe Zappella =

Italian footballer

Personal information
- Date of birth: 4 May 1973 (age 53)
- Place of birth: Milan, Italy
- Height: 1.83 m (6 ft 0 in)
- Position: Defender

Senior career*
Years	Team	Apps	(Gls)
1992–1993	AC Milan	0	(0)
1993–1996	Como	73	(1)
1996–1998	Monza	26	(1)
1998–1999	Urawa Reds	39	(4)
2000	Avellino	14	(0)
2000–2001	Viterbese	29	(3)
2001–2002	Catanzaro	15	(1)
2002–2003	Viterbese	28	(0)
2003–2004	Catanzaro	30	(1)
2004–2005	Nuova Vis Pesaro	17	(1)
2005–2007	Ivrea	62	(1)
2007–2009	Alessandria	46	(1)
2009–2010	Cuneo		
2010	Chieri		
2011–2012	Rivoli		

Managerial career
- 2013–2014: Juventus (youth)
- 2014–2017: Juventus (U19 assistant)
- 2017–2018: Bari (technical coach)
- 2023–2024: Juventus Women (assistant)
- 2024: Juventus Women
- * Club domestic league appearances and goals

Giuseppe Zappella (born 4 May 1973) is an Italian football coach and former player who has been associated with Juventus FC for over a decade, working across youth development, international academy projects, and the women’s first team, which he coached in 2024.

== Coaching career ==
- 2013–2014: Head coach of the under-16 team at Juventus FC
- 2014–2017: Assistant coach of the under-19 (Primavera) team at Juventus FC
- 2017–2018: Assistant coach of the first team at SSC Bari
- 2019: Coach at international camps organized by Juventus FC (China, Switzerland, Spain, France)
- 2019–2022: Technical Director of Juventus Academy Vietnam
- 2022–2023: Regional Curator for Juventus Academy (Turkey, Poland, Bahrain, Oman, Kuwait, Morocco)
- 2023: Assistant coach of the women’s first team at Juventus FC Women
- 2024: First team coach of Juventus FC Women
- 2025: Regional Curator for Juventus Academy (Colombia, Washington, Houston)
- 2025–2026: First team coach of US Sassuolo Calcio Women
