= Aurora De Rita =

Italian footballer (born 1999)

Personal information
- Date of birth: 22 October 1999 (age 27)
- Place of birth: Pontedera, Italy
- Position: Defender

Team information
- Current team: Como 1907
- Number: 20

Youth career
- 2016–2019: Empoli

Senior career*
Years	Team	Apps	(Gls)
2018–2022	Empoli	50	(2)
2022–2024	Sampdoria	45	(3)
2024–2026	Sassuolo	37	(1)
2026–	Como 1907	0	(0)

International career^{‡}
2021–2025	Italy U23	9	(0)
- * Club domestic league appearances and goals as of 17 May 2026 ‡ National team caps and goals as of 20 February 2025

Aurora De Rita (born 22 October 1999) is an Italian professional footballer who plays as a defender for Serie A club Como 1907.

== Club career ==
On 19 July 2026, De Rita joined newly promoted Serie A club Como 1907.
