= Alice Tortelli =

Italian footballer (born 1998)

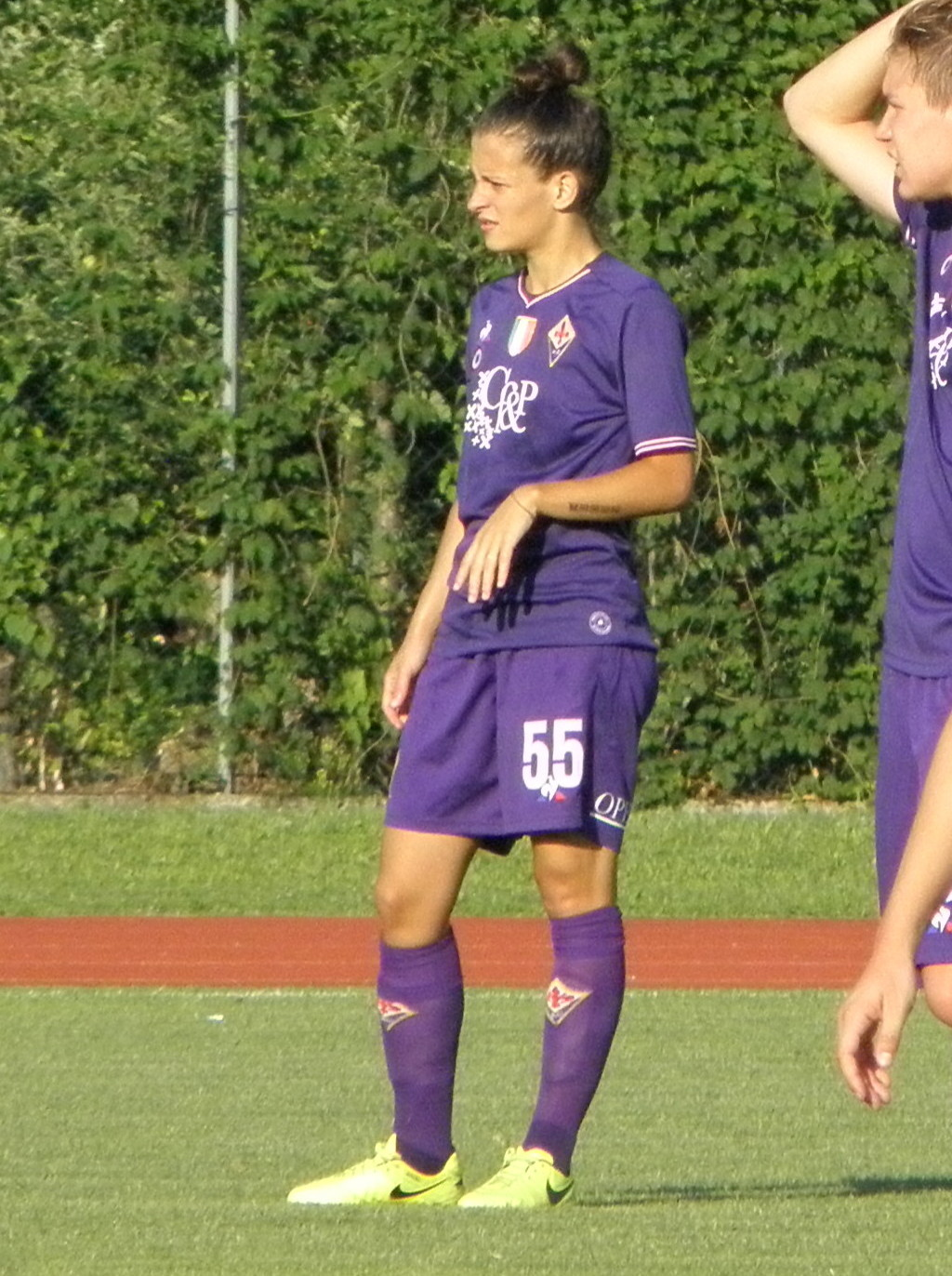

Personal information
- Date of birth: 22 January 1998 (age 28)
- Place of birth: Florence, Italy
- Position: Centre back

Team information
- Current team: Fiorentina
- Number: 5

Senior career*
Years	Team	Apps	(Gls)
2013–2015	Firenze	38	(1)
2015–	Fiorentina	127	(0)

International career^{‡}
2014	Italy U17	3	(0)
2015–2017	Italy U19	13	(0)
2018	Italy U23	1	(0)
2020–	Italy	2	(0)
- * Club domestic league appearances and goals as of 28 August 2022 ‡ National team caps and goals as of 09:03, 20 July 2021 (UTC)

Alice Tortelli (born 22 January 1998) is an Italian professional footballer who plays as a centre back for Serie A club ACF Fiorentina and the Italy women's national team.

== Early life ==
Tortelli has two brothers, who are twins, and was born and raised in Florence. Tortelli started playing football for her brother Lapo's team. She played in defence alongside Lapo and both were often captain.

== Career ==
Tortelli made her debut for the former Firenze club in 2013 and transferred across to Fiorentina when the men's club took up the licence for the women's club.

Tortelli played 18 of the 22 games when Fiorentina won their only Serie A Femminile season in 2016-17, plus Coppa Italia successes in 2017 and 2018.

She made her debut for the Italy national team on 22 September 2020 against Bosnia and Herzegovina, starting the match.
