= Sofia Colombo =

Italian footballer (born 2001)

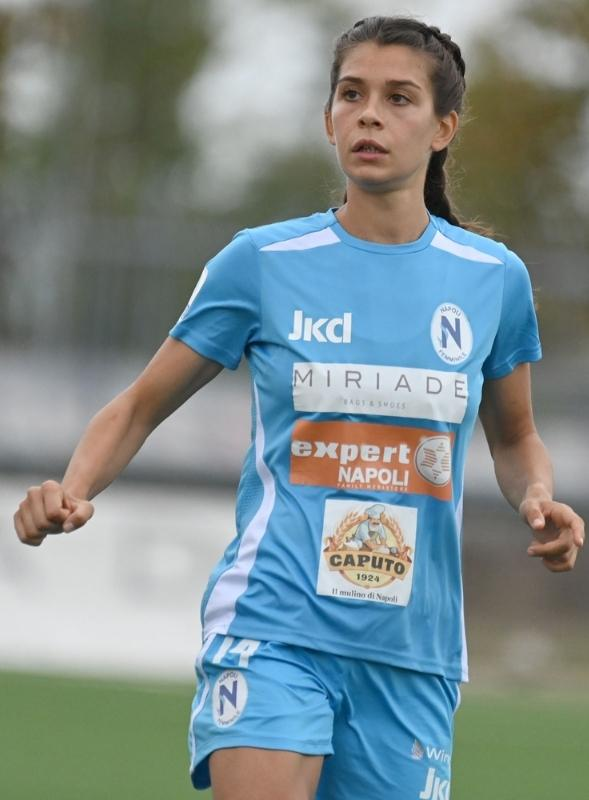

Personal information
- Date of birth: 21 April 2001 (age 25)
- Place of birth: Bergamo, Italy
- Position: Midfielder

Team information
- Current team: Como 1907
- Number: 21

Senior career*
| Years | Team | Apps | (Gls) |
| 2018–2019 | Mozzanica | 20 | (1) |
| 2019–2020 | Inter Milan | 3 | (0) |
| 2020–2021 | Verona | 13 | (0) |
| 2021–2022 | Napoli | 17 | (0) |
| 2022–2024 | Lazio | 56 | (5) |
| 2025 | Sampdoria | 11 | (0) |
| 2025– | Como 1907 | | |

International career
| 2021 | Italy U23 | | |
- * Club domestic league appearances and goals

Sofia Colombo (born 21 April 2001) is an Italian footballer who plays as a midfielder for Como 1907.
