= Margot Shore =

Italian footballer (born 1997)

Personal information
- Full name: Margot Cavazzoni Shore
- Date of birth: 15 March 1997 (age 29)
- Place of birth: Ottawa, Canada
- Position: Goalkeeper

Team information
- Current team: Como 1907

College career
Years	Team	Apps	(Gls)
2014-2015	Pittsburgh Panthers	2	(0)
2016–2019	Ottawa Gee-Gees	43	(0)

Senior career*
Years	Team	Apps	(Gls)
2019	Ottawa South United		
2020–2021	Lecce	20	(0)
2021–2022	Pink Bari	22	(0)
2022–2024	Verona	56	(0)
2024–2025	Bologna	28	(0)
2025–2026	Les Marseillaises	21	(0)
2026–	Como 1907		

International career
2024-	Italy	0	(0)
- * Club domestic league appearances and goals as of 21 November 2025

Margot Cavazzoni Shore (born 15 March 1997) is a professional footballer who plays as a goalkeeper for Serie A club Como 1907. Born in Canada, she has been called up to represent Italy internationally.

== Early life ==
Shore was born on 15 March 1997 in Ottawa, Canada and has a twin sister. The daughter of Mark Shore and Christiana Cavazzoni, she is the granddaughter of Italian water polo player Enzo Cavazzoni.

Growing up, she attended the University of Pittsburgh in the United States. Following her stint there, she attended the University of Ottawa in Canada, where she studied civil engineering.

== Club career ==
Shore started her career with Canadian side Ottawa South United in 2019. In 2020, she signed for Italian side Lecce, before signing for Italian side Pink Bari in 2021.

One year later, she signed for Italian side Hellas Verona. Subsequently, she signed for Italian side Bologna FC in 2024. Ahead of the 2025–26 season, she signed for Les Marseillaises.

== International career ==
As a dual citizen, Shore is eligible to represent either Canada or Italy.

In 2024, she was called up for the first time to the Italy women's national football team to compete in the UEFA Women's Euro 2025 qualifying and the UEFA Women's Nations League double headers and international friendlies.

In 2026, she was called to the Italy women's national football team to compete in the 2027 FIFA Women's World Cup qualification double headers.
