= Sara Cetinja =

Serbian footballer (born 2000)

Personal information
- Date of birth: 16 April 2000 (age 26)
- Place of birth: Novi Sad, FR Yugoslavia
- Height: 1.68 m (5 ft 6 in)
- Position: Goalkeeper

Team information
- Current team: Fiorentina
- Number: 24

Youth career
- 2007–2014: FK „Prof. Bolesnikov“
- 2014–2015: ŽFK Spartak Subotica

Senior career*
Years	Team	Apps	(Gls)
2015–2018	ŽFK Spartak Subotica		
2018–2020	ŽFK Crvena zvezda		
2020–2021	Nancy	2	(0)
2021–2023	Pomigliano	45	(0)
2023–2024	Inter Milan	23	(0)
2024–2025	Lazio	24	(0)
2025–	Fiorentina	0	(0)

International career^{‡}
2019–	Serbia	6	(0)
- * Club domestic league appearances and goals as of 16:42, 7 December 2025 (UTC) ‡ National team caps and goals as of 12:22, 28 October 2023 (UTC)

Sara Cetinja (Serbian Cyrillic: Сара Цетиња, born 16 April 2000) is a Serbian professional footballer who plays as a goalkeeper for Italian Serie A club Fiorentina and the Serbia women's national team.

== Club career ==
On 12 February 2014 Cetinja signed her first contract with national champions ŽFK Spartak Subotica, following seven years in the youth teams at FK „Prof. Bolesnikov“. She made her Serbian Women's Super League debut for the club on 31 August 2015.

In October 2020, Cetinja transferred to AS Nancy Lorraine of the French Division 2 Féminine. She made two league appearances, before the club requested its own demotion to the regional categories at the end of the season.

On 27 July 2021, it was announced that Cetinja had moved from Nancy to newly-promoted Serie A club Pomigliano.

Cetinja joined Inter Milan for the 2023-24 season, starting in goal in 23 of their 28 league games. After one season with the Nerazzurri, Cetinja moved to newly-promoted Lazio in August 2024.

In July 2025, Cetinja signed a one-year contract with ACF Fiorentina.

== International career ==
Cetinja made her first appearance for the senior Serbia women's national football team on 17 June 2019, in a 3–2 friendly win over Romania at the headquarters of the Football Association of Serbia at Stara Pazova.

In October 2021, Cetinja played the full match as a Serbia team depleted by injuries and COVID-19 lost their 2023 FIFA Women's World Cup qualifier 2–1 to Portugal at Estádio do Bonfim in Setúbal.
