= Massimiliano Canzi =

Italian football manager (born 1966)

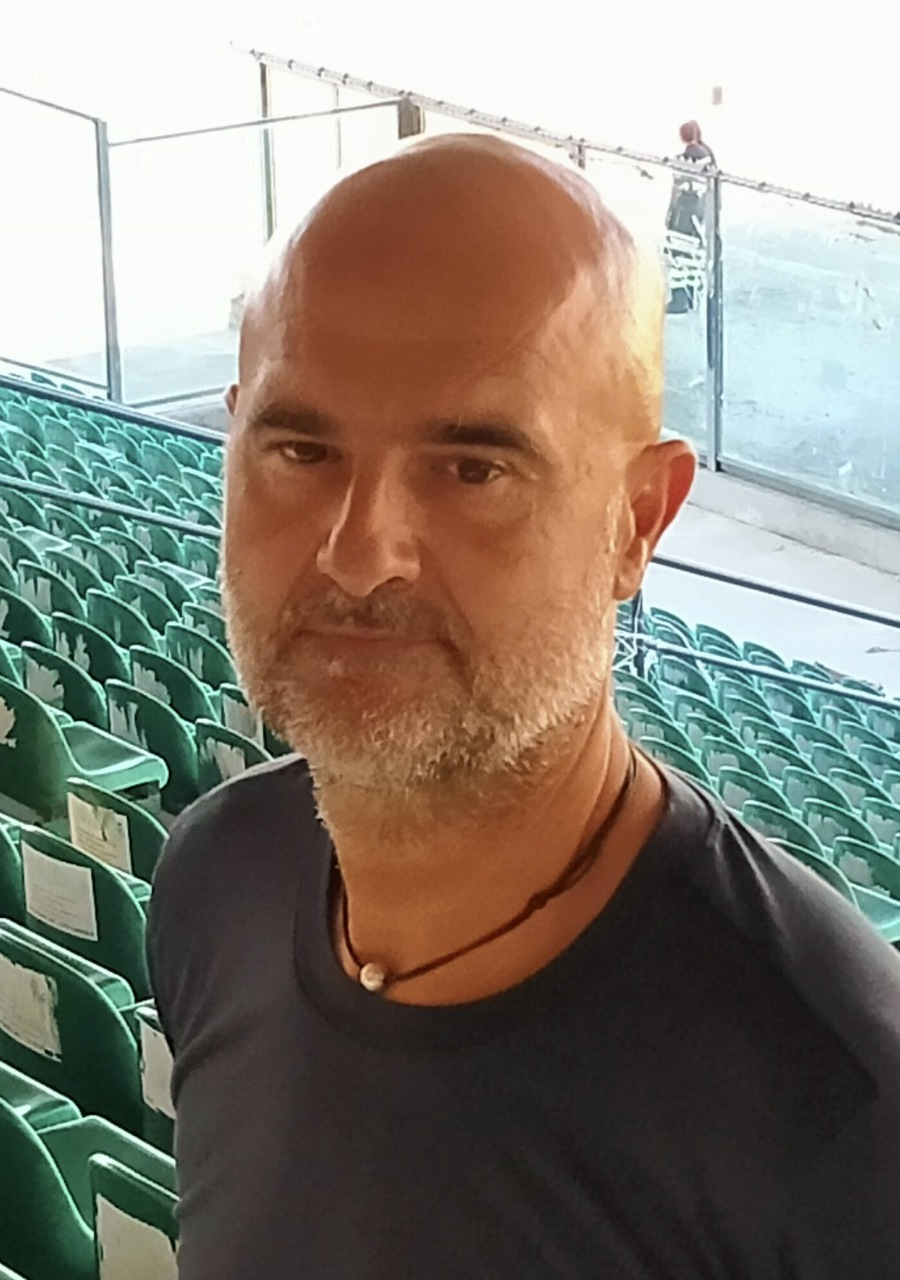
- Canzi in 2021

Personal information
- Full name: Massimiliano Canzi
- Date of birth: 4 July 1966 (age 60)
- Place of birth: Milan, Italy

Managerial career
- Years: Team
- 2001–2005: Sandonatese
- 2005–2006: Paullese
- 2020–2022: Olbia
- 2022: Turris
- 2022–2024: Pontedera
- 2024–2026: Juventus Women

Massimiliano "Max" Canzi (born 4 July 1966) is an Italian football coach who most recently coached Juventus Women.

== Career ==
Canzi started his coaching career in 1985, working as a youth coach for a variety of amateur clubs. During these years, he also graduated in sports science in 1994 and did several small jobs, including working as an entertainer and an ambulance volunteer.

In 2001, Canzi took on his first head coaching job at Eccellenza amateur club Sandonatese; in 2005, he moved to Promozione club Paullese. In 2007, he met Mario Beretta and joined his coaching staff at Siena, then following him at his later managerial roles at Lecce, Torino, Brescia, Cesena, Latina and PAOK FC.

In 2015, Canzi accepted a new role as the Under-19 coach of Cagliari. After five years at Cagliari, in 2020 he took his first head coaching job in a professional team, taking over at fellow Sardinian club Olbia in the Serie C league, a role he filled in for two seasons before departing in May 2022. He then briefly worked at fellow Serie C club Turris during the pre-season, being sacked just a week before the first matchday of the regular season. In October 2022, Canzi returned to management as the new head coach of Serie C club Pontedera.

After two positive seasons at Pontedera, on 10 May 2024, Canzi announced his departure from the club. On 22 May 2024, he was unveiled as the new head coach of Juventus Women. During his two-year tenure, he won four titles: a Serie A, a Coppa Italia, a Serie A Women's Cup and a Supercoppa Italiana.
