= Como 1907 (women) =

Women's football club in Italy

Como
- Nicknames: I Lariani (Those from Lake Como); I Biancoblù (The Blue and Whites); I Voltiani (The Voltaics)
- Founded: 17 April 2020; 6 years ago
- Ground: Stadio La Marmora-Pozzo
- Capacity: 5,210
- Owner: Djarum Group
- President: Mirwan Suwarso
- Head coach: Selena Mazzantini
- League: Serie A
- 2025–26: Serie B, 1st of 14 (promoted)
- Website: comofootball.com
Home colours	Away colours

Como 1907 (Italian pronunciation: [ˈkɔːmo]) is an Italian professional women's football club based in Como, Lombardy. The club competes in the Serie A, the first tier of Italian women's football. Founded in 2020, it is the women's section of the homonymous professional football club.

== History ==
In April 2020, Como 1907 decided to establish its own women's football section, initially with two teams, under 15 and under 17, entrusting its development to Elio Garavaglia, former youth coach of AC Milan and then technical assistant in Serie A at Palermo, but with a significant amount of experience also in women's soccer.

Starting from the Promozione championship, the fifth and lowest level in the pyramid of the women's system, in the Lombardy group, the first team, made up of under 19 athletes, managed in its second season, winning Group A of the 2023–2024 edition, to earn promotion to Eccellenza, a championship in which it obtained second place at the end of the 2024–2025 season. In the summer of 2024, the club also announced the arrival of one of the most representative players of the US national team, Heather O'Reilly, to the technical staff.

In view of the 2025–2026 season, Como 1907 has officially taken over the sporting title of ChievoVerona FM for participation in the Serie B championship, thus making a double leap in category. In that season, the team, entrusted to the technical guidance of Selena Mazzantini, counting on a technically superior squad thanks to the arrival, among others, of Spanish Elisa del Estal and Verónica Boquete, Danish Cecilie Sandvej and Slovenian Dominika Čonč, to whom Valentina Giacinti was added in the winter session, won the championship with three days to spare, consequently gaining the first promotion to Serie A in its history.

== Players ==
=== Current squad ===
As of 30 August 2026

Note: Flags indicate national team as defined under FIFA eligibility rules; some limited exceptions apply. Players may hold more than one non-FIFA nationality.

No.	Pos.	Nation	Player
2	GK	ITA	Francesca Durante
3	DF	ITA	Federica Veritti
4	FW	ITA	Agnese Bonfantini
5	DF	DEN	Sofie Svava
6	MF	DEN	Louise Eriksen
7	FW	NOR	Emilie Haavi
8	FW	SWE	Freja Olofsson
9	FW	ESP	Eli del Estal
10	MF	SUI	Riola Xhemaili
11	FW	ITA	Giuseppina Moraca
14	DF	ESP	Carmen Menayo
16	DF	SUI	Eseosa Aigbogun

No.	Pos.	Nation	Player
17	DF	SLO	Dominika Čonč
18	FW	ITA	Roberta Picchi
20	DF	ITA	Aurora De Rita
21	MF	ITA	Sofia Colombo
22	GK	ITA	Emma Guidi
23	DF	ITA	Elena Pisani
24	FW	ITA	Francesca Pittaccio
28	MF	MEX	Silvana Flores
26	MF	POL	Martyna Wiankowska
30	GK	ITA	Margot Shore
32	FW	ITA	Valentina Giacinti
33	FW	BEL	Tessa Wullaert
87	FW	ESP	Verónica Boquete

== Honours ==
- Serie B
  - Winners: 2025–26
- Eccellenza Lombardy
  - Runners-up: 2024–25
- Promozione Lombardy
  - Winners: 2023–24
