= ACF Fiorentina (women) =

Italian football club

Fiorentina
- Full name: ACF Fiorentina S.r.l
- Nicknames: Fiorentina, Viola, Gigliate
- Founded: July 2015; 11 years ago
- Ground: Rocco B. Commisso Viola Park
- Capacity: 3,000
- Chairman: Giuseppe B. Commisso
- Coach: Pablo Piñones Arce
- League: Serie A
- 2025–26: Serie A, 4th of 12
- Website: www.acffiorentina.com
Home colors	Away colors

ACF Fiorentina, or simply Fiorentina, is an Italian women's football club based in Florence, Italy.

== History ==
The club was founded in 2015 when ACF Fiorentina acquired the Serie A license of the existing women's club A.C.F. Firenze. Upon its foundation, Fiorentina Women's FC became the first ever professionally affiliated women's football club in the history of Italy. The team competes in Serie A.

=== Della Valle era (2015-2019) ===
The first president of the Fiorentina Women's FC was Sandro Mencucci, who was CEO of ACF Fiorentina.

In the 2016–17 season, the Fiorentina Women's Football Club won both the Serie A Championship and the Coppa Italia Championship. This was the first scudetto for the club ACF Fiorentina since 1969 and also the first Serie A championship won by ACF Fiorentina's current owner Andrea Della Valle. On 17 June 2017, the club ACF Fiorentina won their first double. The Fiorentina Women's FC for the second consecutive year became the Coppa Italia title holders for their 3–1 win over Brescia. The Fiorentina Women's FC qualified to participate in the 2017–18, 2018–19 UEFA Champions League and 2019–20 UEFA Champions League competitions.

=== Commisso era (2019-2025) ===
On 6 June 2019, the Fiorentina Women's Football Club passed into the hands of the Italian-American businessman Rocco Commisso, who purchased it from Diego and Andrea Della Valle together with ACF Fiorentina. The following season, 2019–20, the team qualified to participate in the 2020–21 UEFA Champions League competition. On 13 July 2020, SSD Fiorentina Women's Football Club was absorbed by Fiorentina SpA as ACF Fiorentina Femminile. In the summer of 2021 the coach Antonio Cincotta was not reconfirmed, leaving after 6 seasons; in his place the technical guide was assigned to Patrizia Panico in an year that could be seen as a season of transition for Fiorentina. The club was forced to worry more about avoiding a relegation battle than fighting for a Champions League place.

Fiorentina started the 2023–24 season with a new coach, Sebastián de la Fuente. The season proved positive for the club, despite the lack of trophies, having reached the third place in the Serie A, and with defeats in the Coppa Italia final (on penalties, against Roma). After four years, the team qualified to participate in the 2024-25 UEFA Champions League competition, but failed to reach the group stage.

== Season by season ==
Season	League			Coppa Italia	Supercoppa Italiana	Serie A Women's Cup	UEFA Champions League
Season	Tier	Division	Position	Coppa Italia	Supercoppa Italiana	Serie A Women's Cup	UEFA Champions League
2015–2016	1	Serie A	Third place	Round of 16	N/A	Not played	N/A
2016–2017	1	Serie A	Champions	Champions	–	Not played	–
2017–2018	1	Serie A	Third place	Champions	Runners-up	Not played	Round of 16
2018–2019	1	Serie A	Runners-up	Runners-up	Champions	Not played	Round of 16
2019–2020	1	Serie A	Runners-up	Not concluded	Runners-up	Not played	Round of 32
2020–2021	1	Serie A	4th	Quarter-finals	Runners-up	Not played	Round of 16
2021–2022	1	Serie A	7th	Quarter-finals	–	Not played	–
2022–2023	1	Serie A	4th	Quarter-finals	–	Not played	–
2023–2024	1	Serie A	Third place	Runners-up	–	Not played	–
2024–2025	1	Serie A	4th	Semi-finals	Runners-up	Not played	Second round
2025–2026	1	Serie A	4th	Semi-finals	–	Group stage	–

== Stadium ==
Fiorentina' home ground is the 3000-capacity Curva Fiesole Stadium (Stadio Curva Fiesole), situated inside the "Rocco B. Commisso Viola Park" Training Center in Bagno a Ripoli, near Florence. The Training Center was inaugurated on 11 October 2023, Stadio Curva Fiesole received UEFA licence.

== Players ==
=== Current squad ===
As of 8 November 2025.

Note: Flags indicate national team as defined under FIFA eligibility rules; some limited exceptions apply. Players may hold more than one non-FIFA nationality.

No.	Pos.	Nation	Player
1	GK	NOR	Cecilie Fiskerstrand
2	DF	NOR	Emilie Woldvik
3	DF	NOR	Oda Johansen
4	FW	ITA	Agnese Bonfantini
5	DF	ITA	Alice Tortelli
7	FW	ITA	Miriam Chiara Longo
8	FW	SWE	Lina Hurtig
9	FW	SWE	Madelen Janogy
10	MF	ITA	Michela Catena
11	MF	BEL	Sarah Wijnants
14	DF	ITA	Martina Toniolo
15	FW	DEN	Sofie Bredgaard
16	DF	ITA	Emma Lombardi
18	MF	DEN	Emma Snerle

No.	Pos.	Nation	Player
19	FW	USA	Victoria Della Peruta
20	DF	ITA	Benedetta Orsi
21	MF	ITA	Emma Severini (captain)
22	DF	NED	Ilse van der Zanden
23	GK	ITA	Giorgia Bettineschi
24	GK	SRB	Sara Cetinja
25	FW	ITA	Siria Mailia
26	MF	ITA	Maya Cherubini
27	MF	ISL	Katla Tryggvadóttir
44	DF	DEN	Emma Skou Færge
51	FW	NOR	Iris Omarsdottir
77	MF	SWE	Filippa Curmark
85	DF	ITA	Maria Luisa Filangeri

=== Captains ===
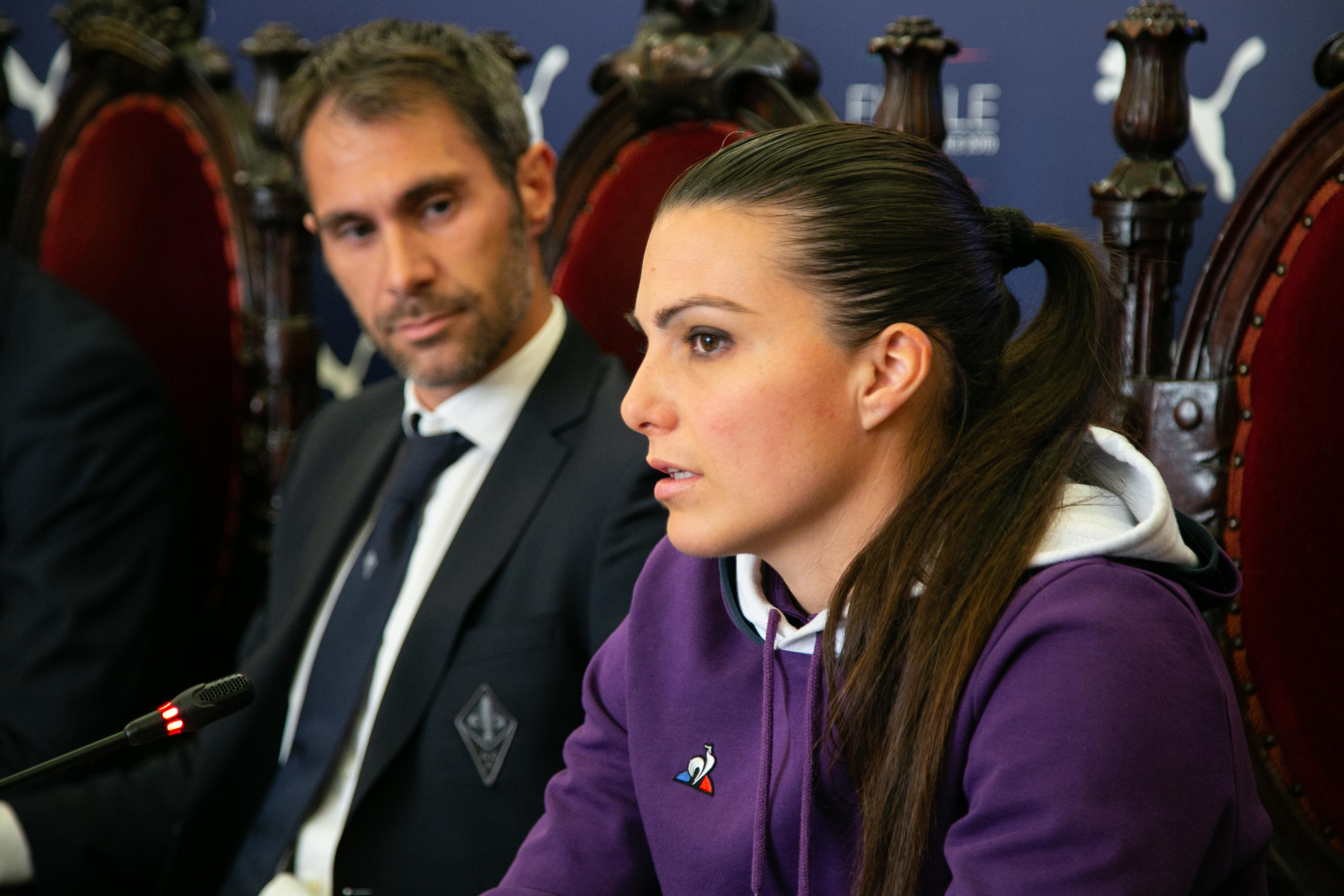
Alia Guagni played for ACF Firenze and Fiorentina.

- (Italy) Giulia Orlandi (2015–2017)
- (Italy) Alia Guagni (2017–2020)
- (Sweden) Stephanie Öhrström (2020–2021)
- (Italy) Greta Adami (2021)
- (Italy) Alice Tortelli (2021–2025)
- (Italy) Emma Severini (2025–)

== Managerial history ==
Below is a list of Fiorentina Women coaches from 2015 until the present day.

Name	Nationality	Years
Sauro Fattori	Italy	2015–2016
Sauro Fattori and Antonio Cincotta	Italy	2016–2018
Antonio Cincotta	Italy	2018–2021
Patrizia Panico	Italy	2021–2023
Sebastián De La Fuente	Argentina	2023–2025
Pablo Piñones Arce	Sweden	2025–

== Honours ==
- Serie A:
  - Winners (1): 2016–17
  - Runners-up (2): 2018–19, 2019–20
- Coppa Italia:
  - Winners (2): 2016–17, 2017–18
  - Runners-up (2): 2018–19, 2023–24
- Supercoppa Italiana:
  - Winners (1): 2018
  - Runners-up (4): 2017, 2019, 2020, 2024

== Awards ==
The following Fiorentina players have been inducted into the Italian Hall of Fame.

Arsenal W.F.C. players inducted into the English Football Hall of Fame
Ind.	Name	Nationality	Pos.	Years	Ref.
2015	Patrizia Panico	Italy	FW	2015–2016	

== European record ==
As of match played 25 September 2024

Season	Round	Opposition	1st leg	2nd leg	Aggregate
2017–18	Round of 32	(Denmark) Fortuna Hjørring	2–1 (H)	0–0 (A)	2–1
2017–18	Round of 16	(Germany) Wolfsburg	0–4 (H)	3–3 (A)	3–7
2018–19	Round of 32	(Denmark) Fortuna Hjørring	2–0 (H)	2–0 (A)	4–0
2018–19	Round of 16	(England) Chelsea	0–1 (A)	0–6 (H)	0–7
2019–20	Round of 32	(England) Arsenal	0–4 (H)	0–2 (A)	0–6
2020–21	Round of 32	(Czech Republic) Slavia Prague	2–2 (H)	1–0 (A)	3–2
2020–21	Round of 16	(England) Manchester City	0–3 (A)	0–5 (H)	0–8
2024–25	First round	(Denmark) Brøndby IF	1–0 (A) (semi-final)		
2024–25	First round	(Netherlands) Ajax	1–0 (N) (final)		
2024–25	Second round	(Germany) Wolfsburg	0–7 (H)	0–5 (A)	0–12

== See also ==
- List of women's association football clubs
- List of women's football clubs in Italy
