= Serie A Women's Cup =

National women's football cup competition

- Organiser(s): FIGC
- Founded: 2025; 1 year ago
- Region: Italy
- Teams: 12
- Current champions: Juventus (2nd title)
- Most championships: Juventus (2 titles)
- Broadcaster(s): RAI; Sky Sport
- 2026 Serie A Women's Cup

The Serie A Women's Cup (Italian: Coppa Femminile di Serie A) (Note: The Italian Football Federation refers to the competition by its English name, the Serie A Women's Cup, even in Italian.) is the national women's football league cup competition for the Serie A Women, the top division of women's football in Italy. It was created in 2025 and is organised annually by the Italian Football Federation (FIGC).

== History ==
In 2025, the Italian Football Federation (FIGC) announced a new league cup competition for only Serie A Femminile clubs that would begin prior to the commencement of the 2025–26 Serie A Femminile season.

== Format ==
Each of the 12 teams are placed into three groups of four teams for the group stage. The top team from each group and the best second-place team overall advance to the semi-finals, and the two semi-final winners advance to the final.

== List of finals ==
Year	Winners	Result	Runners-up	Venue
2025	Juventus	3–2	Roma	Stadio Romeo Menti, Castellammare di Stabia
2026	Juventus	2–2 (a.e.t.) (4–2 p)	Roma	Stadio Torquato Bresciani, Viareggio
