= 2024–25 AS Roma (women) season =

A.S. Roma
2024–25 season
- Manager: Alessandro Spugna
- Stadium: Stadio Tre Fontane
- Serie A: 3rd
- Coppa Italia: Quarter-Finals
- Supercoppa: Winners
- Champions League: Group Stage
- Top goalscorer: League: Manuela Giugliano(12); All: Manuela Giugliano(16)
- Highest home attendance: 1,906 (vs Lyon, 13 November 2024)
- Lowest home attendance: 1,142 (vs Galatasaray, 17 December 2024)
- Biggest win: 7–2 (vs Servette (H), Champions League, 26 September 2024); 6–1 (vs Galatasaray (A), Champions League, 17 December 2024)
- Biggest defeat: 1–6 (vs Wolfsburg (A), Champions League, 11 December 2024)
Home colours	Away colours	Third colours
- All statistics correct as of 29 July 2025.

The 2024–25 season will be AS Roma's 7th season in Italy's first league. The club will participate in the Serie A Femminile, the Coppa Italia, the Supercoppa Italiana and the Champions League.

== Squad information & statistics ==
=== First team squad ===
No.	Name	Date of Birth (Age)	Since	Last Contract	Signed from
Goalkeepers
1	(Czech Republic) Olivie Lukášová	4 June 2001 (age 24)	2024	July 2024	(Czech Republic) SK Slavia Prague
12	(Romania) Camelia Ceasar	13 December 1997 (age 28)	2019	July 2023	(Italy) Milan
30	(Austria) Isabella Kresche	28 November 1998 (age 27)	2024	September 2024	(Italy) Sassuolo
52	(Italy) Liliana Merolla	16 September 2005 (age 20)	2022	July 2022	Homegrown
Defenders
2	(Japan) Moeka Minami	7 December 1998 (age 27)	2022	February 2024	(Japan) Urawa Reds
3	(Italy) Lucia Di Guglielmo	26 June 1997 (age 28)	2021	February 2023	(Italy) Empoli
6	(Spain) Oihane Valdezate	10 April 2000 (age 26)	2023	July 2023	(Spain) Athletic Club
14	(Switzerland) Eseosa Aigbogun	23 May 1993 (age 32)	2023	May 2024	(France) Paris FC
19	(Austria) Verena Hanshaw	20 January 1994 (age 32)	2024	May 2024	(Germany) Eintracht Frankfurt
19	(Nigeria) Shukurat Oladipo	22 September 2004 (age 21)	2025	February 2025	(Nigeria) FC Robo
23	(France) Hawa Cissoko	10 April 1997 (age 29)	2024	July 2024	(England) West Ham United
32	(Italy) Elena Linari	15 April 1994 (age 32)	2021	August 2022	(France) Bordeaux
Midfielders
8	(Japan) Saki Kumagai	17 October 1990 (age 35)	2023	June 2023	(Germany) Bayern Munich
10	(Italy) Manuela Giugliano (c)	18 August 1997 (age 28)	2019	December 2023	(Italy) Milan
15	(Italy) Giulia Dragoni	7 November 2006 (age 19)	2024	July 2024 (loan)	(Spain) Barcelona
20	(Italy) Giada Greggi	18 February 2000 (age 26)	2018	October 2023	Homegrown
22	(Italy) Marta Pandini	21 March 1998 (age 28)	2024	February 2024	(Italy) Inter
24	(Denmark) Kathrine Møller Kühl	5 July 2003 (age 22)	2025	January 2025	(England) Arsenal
25	(Denmark) Frederikke Thøgersen	24 July 1995 (age 30)	2024	July 2024	(Italy) Inter
48	(South Korea) Kim Shin-ji	3 May 2004 (age 21)	2025	February 2025	(South Korea) Uiduk University
51	(Denmark) Sanne Troelsgaard	15 August 1988 (age 37)	2024	September 2024	(England) Reading
88	(Slovenia) Maja Madon	19 February 2007 (age 19)	2024	August 2024	(Slovenia) ŽNK Olimpija Ljubljana
Forwards
7	(Canada) Evelyne Viens	6 February 1997 (age 29)	2023	August 2023	(Sweden) Kristianstad
9	(Italy) Valentina Giacinti	2 January 1994 (age 32)	2022	June 2024	(Italy) Milan
11	(Norway) Emilie Haavi	16 June 1992 (age 33)	2021	March 2023	(Norway) LSK Kvinner
16	(Italy) Alice Corelli	28 November 2003 (age 22)	2020	July 2023	Homegrown
17	(Switzerland) Alayah Pilgrim	29 April 2003 (age 23)	2024	January 2024	(Switzerland) Zürich
18	(Italy) Benedetta Glionna	26 July 1999 (age 26)	2021	June 2023	(Italy) Juventus
21	(Canada) Mia Pante	25 March 2003 (age 23)	2025	January 2025	(United States) Texas A&M University
47	(Italy) Giulia Galli	23 March 2008 (age 18)	N/A	N/A	Homegrown

=== Statistics ===
Statistics as of 4 January 2024

==== Appearances and goals ====
No.	Name	Serie A Femminile		Coppa Italia		Supercoppa		UWCL		Total	
No.	Name	Apps	Goals	Apps	Goals	Apps	Goals	Apps	Goals	Apps	Goals
Goalkeepers
1	(Czech Republic) Olivie Lukášová	0	0	0	0	0	0	0	0	0	0
12	(Romania) Camelia Ceasar	18+1	0	3	0	0	0	7	0	28+1	0
30	(Austria) Isabella Kresche	8	0	2	0	1	0	1	0	12	0
52	(Italy) Liliana Merolla	0	0	0+1	0	0	0	0	0	0+1	0
Defenders
2	(Japan) Moeka Minami	24	3	4	0	1	0	8	1	37	4
3	(Italy) Lucia Di Guglielmo	20+4	4	3+1	0	0	0	6	0	29+5	4
6	(Spain) Oihane Valdezate	0	0	0	0	0	0	0	0	0	0
14	(Switzerland) Eseosa Aigbogun	1+6	0	2+1	0	0+1	0	1	0	4+8	0
19	(Austria) Verena Hanshaw	0+1	0	0	0	0	0	0	0	0+1	0
19	(Nigeria) Shukurat Oladipo	9+1	0	1	0	1	0	1+1	0	12+2	0
23	(France) Hawa Cissoko	5+2	0	2+2	0	0	0	3	1	10+4	1
25	(Denmark) Frederikke Thøgersen	20+6	1	4+1	0	1	0	8	0	33+7	1
32	(Italy) Elena Linari	22	2	3	1	1	0	7	1	33	4
Midfielders
8	(Japan) Saki Kumagai	11+1	0	1	1	1	0	8	1	16+1	2
10	(Italy) Manuela Giugliano (c)	26	12	5+1	1	1	0	8	3	39+1	16
15	(Italy) Giulia Dragoni	12+9	2+3	2	1	0	0	3+3	3	17+15	6
20	(Italy) Giada Greggi	17+2	3	3+1	1	1	0	7+1	0	28+4	4
22	(Italy) Marta Pandini	5+8	2	3+1	0	0+1	0	0+6	1	8+16	3
24	(Denmark) Kathrine Møller Kühl	6+6	1	3+1	0	0	0	0	0	9+7	1
48	(South Korea) Kim Shin-ji	0+1	0	0+1	0	0	0	0	0	0+2	0
51	(Denmark) Sanne Troelsgaard	9+13	0	4	0	0	0	2+6	0	15+19	0
88	(Slovenia) Maja Madon	0	0	0+1	0	0	0	0	0	0+1	0
Forwards
7	(Canada) Evelyne Viens	14+2	6	2+2	1	0	0	3+2	2	19+6	9
9	(Italy) Valentina Giacinti	17+7	6	3+1	2	1	1	6+2	3	27+10	13
11	(Norway) Emilie Haavi	23+2	2	3+2	1	1	0	5+1	2	32+5	5
16	(Italy) Alice Corelli	5+12	2	3+1	1	0+1	1	1+5	2	9+19	7
17	(Switzerland) Alayah Pilgrim	5+9	1	1+3	1	0	0	0+2	0	6+14	2
18	(Italy) Benedetta Glionna	9+11	1	5+1	2	1	1	3+4	0	18+16	4
21	(Canada) Mia Pante	0+3	0	0+1	0	0	0	0	0	0+4	0
35	(Italy) Rosanna Ventriglia	0+2	0	0	0	0	0	0+1	1	0+3	1
47	(Italy) Giulia Galli	0	0	0	0	0	0	0	0	0	0

==== Goalscorers ====
Rank	No.	Position	Name	Serie A Femminile	Coppa Italia	Supercoppa	UWCL	Total
1	10	MF	(Italy) Manuela Giugliano	6	0	0	3	9
2	9	FW	(Italy) Valentina Giacinti	4	0	0	3	7
3	7	FW	(Canada) Evelyne Viens	4	0	0	2	6
4	11	FW	(Norway) Emilie Haavi	1	1	0	2	4
4	15	MF	(Italy) Giulia Dragoni	0	1	0	3	4
6	3	DF	(Italy) Lucia Di Guglielmo	3	0	0	0	3
7	2	DF	(Japan) Moeka Minami	1	0	0	1	2
7	8	MF	(Japan) Saki Kumagai	0	1	0	1	2
7	16	FW	(Italy) Alice Corelli	0	1	0	1	2
7	18	FW	(Italy) Benedetta Glionna	1	1	0	0	2
7	20	MF	(Italy) Giada Greggi	1	1	0	0	2
7	22	MF	(Italy) Marta Pandini	1	0	0	1	2
12	17	FW	(Switzerland) Alayah Pilgrim	1	0	0	0	1
12	23	DF	(France) Hawa Cissoko	0	0	0	1	1
12	32	DF	(Italy) Elena Linari	1	0	0	0	1
Total				20	6	0	18	44

==== Clean sheets ====
Rank	No.	Name	Serie A Femminile	Coppa Italia	Supercoppa	UWCL	Total
1	30	(Austria) Isabella Kresche	0	1	0	1	2
1	12	(Romania) Camelia Ceasar	1	0	0	1	2
3	1	(Czech Republic) Olivie Lukášová	0	0	0	0	0
4	52	(Italy) Liliana Merolla	0	0	0	0	0
Total			1	1	0	2	4

== Transfers, loans and other signings ==
=== Transfers in ===
Announcement date	No.	Position	Player	From club
8 May 2024	19	DF	(Austria) Verena Hanshaw	(Germany) Frankfurt
5 July 2024	1	GK	(Czech Republic) Olivie Lukášová	(Czech Republic) Slavia Prague
11 July 2024	25	MF	(Denmark) Frederikke Thøgersen	(Italy) Inter
17 July 2024	15	MF	(Italy) Giulia Dragoni	(Spain) Barcelona (loan)
26 July 2024	23	DF	(France) Hawa Cissoko	(England) West Ham United
26 July 2024	?	FW	(Italy) Victoria Della Peruta	(Italy) Sampdoria
21 September 2024	30	GK	(Austria) Isabella Kresche	(Italy) Sassuolo
4 January 2025	21	FW	(Canada) Mia Pante	(United States) Texas A&M University
18 January 2025	24	MF	(Denmark) Kathrine Møller Kühl	(England) Arsenal
6 February 2025	48	MF	(South Korea) Kim Shin-ji	(South Korea) Uiduk University

=== Contract extensions ===
Announcement date	No.	Position	Player	At AS Roma since
28 May 2024	51	MF	(Denmark) Sanne Troelsgaard	2024
10 June 2024	9	FW	(Italy) Valentina Giacinti	2022

=== Transfers out ===
Announcement date	No.	Position	Player	To club
19 May 2024	87	GK	(Sweden) Stéphanie Öhrström	Retirement
19 May 2024	16	MF	(Italy) Claudia Ciccotti	(Italy) Ternana
27 May 2024	1	GK	(Finland) Tinja-Riikka Korpela	(Switzerland) Servette
28 May 2024	22	DF	(Norway) Anja Sønstevold	Retirement
1 June 2024	23	MF	(Austria) Laura Feiersinger	(Germany) Köln
30 July 2024	21	FW	(Italy) Martina Tomaselli	(Italy) Inter
9 August 2024	13	DF	(Italy) Elisa Bartoli	(Italy) Inter
21 January 2025	19	DF	(Austria) Verena Hanshaw	(England) West Ham
23 January 2025	8	MF	(Japan) Saki Kumagai	(England) London City Lionesses
4 February 2025	N/A	FW	(Italy) Tori DellaPeruta	(Italy) Fiorentina

=== Loans out ===
Announcement date	No.	Position	Player	To club
26 July 2024	9	FW	(Italy) Victoria Della Peruta	(Italy) Sampdoria
15 August 2024	33	MF	(Slovenia) Zara Kramžar	(Italy) Como
?	14	FW	(Italy) Giada Pellegrino Cimò	(Italy) Sampdoria

== Suspensions ==
No.	Position	Player	Games suspended	Reason
9	FW	(Italy) Valentina Giacinti	v. Napoli, 15 January 2025 v. Juventus, 19 January 2025 v. Milan, 25 January 2025	Red Card

== Pre-season ==
10 August 2024	Como (Italy)	2–2	Roma	Rome, Italy
17:00 CEST	?; ?	Report	Haavi; Pandini

13 August 2024	Roma	1–0	(Italy) Napoli	Rome, Italy
17:30 CEST	Giacinti	Report

17 August 2024	Roma	3–0	(Italy) Fiorentina	Rome, Italy
17:00 CEST	Troelsgaard; Haavi; Giacinti	Report

22 August 2024 Semi-Final	Roma	3–2	(Netherlands) PSV	Toulouse, France
18:00 CEST	Giacinti 62'; Corelli 90'; Di Guglielmo 90+8'	Report	Ripa 18'; Smits 48'	Stadium: Stade Ernest-Wallon

25 August 2024 Final	Roma	2–1	(Spain) Athletic Club	Toulouse, France
18:00 CEST	Giacinti 1' 23'	Report	García 50'	Stadium: Stade Ernest-Wallon

== Competitions ==
=== Serie A Fem ===
==== League round table ====
Pos	Team	Pld	W	D	L	GF	GA	GD	Pts	Qualification
1	Juventus	18	14	3	1	51	16	+35	45	Advanced to the championship round
2	Inter Milan	18	11	5	2	34	14	+20	38	Advanced to the championship round
3	Roma	18	10	5	3	36	20	+16	35	Advanced to the championship round
4	Fiorentina	18	8	4	6	24	24	0	28	Advanced to the championship round
5	Milan	18	7	4	7	25	28	−3	25	Advanced to the championship round
6	Como	18	7	1	10	25	32	−7	22	Participates in the relegation round
7	Lazio	18	5	5	8	29	28	+1	20	Participates in the relegation round
8	Sassuolo	18	5	4	9	29	34	−5	19	Participates in the relegation round
9	Napoli	18	2	4	12	10	34	−24	10	Participates in the relegation round
10	Sampdoria	18	1	5	12	8	41	−33	8	Participates in the relegation round

Source: FIGC.it
Rules for classification: Tiebreakers

==== Results summary ====
Overall								Home						Away					
Pld	W	D	L	GF	GA	GD	Pts	W	D	L	GF	GA	GD	W	D	L	GF	GA	GD
18	10	5	3	36	20	+16	35	7	1	1	19	8	+11	3	4	2	17	12	+5

Last updated: 25 January 2025.

==== Results by matchday ====
Matchday	1	2	3	4	5	6	7	8	9	10	11	12	13	14	15	16	17	18
Ground	A	H	A	H	A	A	H	A	H	H	A	H	A	H	H	A	H	A
Result	D	D	W	W	D	L	W	W	W	W	D	W	W	L	W	L	W	D
Position	6	6	4	4	4	5	4	4	4	4	4	4	3	3	3	3	3	3

A = Away; H = Home; W = Win; D = Draw; L = Loss; P = Postponed

==== Matches ====
30 August 2024 1	Lazio	2–2	Roma	Rome
21:05 CEST	Le Bihan 44'; Castiello 59'	Report	Giacinti 12'; Linari 90+2'	Stadium: Stadio Mirko Fersini; Referee: Stefano Milone

14 September 2024 2	Roma	1–1	Sassuolo	Rome
12:30 CEST	Giugliano 15'	Report	Clelland 16'	Stadium: Stadio Tre Fontane; Referee: Domenico Castellone

22 September 2024 3	Como	1–3	Roma	Seregno
12:30 CEST	Karlernäs 23'	Report	Viens 35' 45'; Gilardi 49' (o.g.)	Stadium: Stadio Ferruccio; Referee: Riccardo Tropiano

29 October 2024 4	Roma	3–1	Napoli	Rome
12:30 CEST	Giugliano 20' 37'; Viens 27'	Report	Giordano 80'	Stadium: Stadio Tre Fontane; Referee: Valerio Vogliacco

5 October 2024 5	Inter	1–1	Roma	Milan
15:00 CEST	Karchouni 88'	Report	Milinković 42' (o.g.)	Stadium: Arena Civica Gianni Brera; Referee: Giuseppe Mucera

13 October 2024 6	Juventus	2–1	Roma	Turin
15:30 CEST	Bonansea 13' Cantore 35'	Report	Glionna 90+3'	Stadium: Juventus Stadium; Referee: Andrea Calzavara

20 October 2024 7	Roma	2–1	Milan	Rome
15:30 CEST	Giugliano 22'; Giacinti 75'	Report	Ijeh 5'	Stadium: Stadio Tre Fontane; Referee: Lucio Felice Angelillo

3 November 2024 8	Sampdoria	1–5	Roma	Genoa
15:00 CET	Bertucci 90+2'	Report	Haavi 6'; Pandini 12'; Viens 18'; Di Guglielmo 86'; Pilgrim 89'	Stadium: Stadio La Sciorba; Referee: Alberto Poli

9 November 2024 9	Roma	1–0	Fiorentina	Rome
14:00 CET	Greggi 9'	Report		Stadium: Stadio Tre Fontane; Referee: Aleksandar Djurdjevic

17 November 2024 10	Roma	2–1	Lazio	Rome
15:30 CET	Di Guglielmo 57'; Giacinti 72'	Report	Thøgersen 89' (o.g.)	Stadium: Stadio Tre Fontane; Referee: Francesco Burlando

24 November 2024 11	Sassuolo	1–1	Roma	Sassuolo
16:00 CET	Prugna 10'	Report	Giugliano 35'	Stadium: Stadio Enzo Ricci; Referee: Erminio Cerbasi

6 December 2024 12	Roma	2–1	Como	Rome
20:30 CET	Di Guglielmo 59'; Giacinti 67'	Report	Karlenäs 10'	Stadium: Stadio Tre Fontane; Referee: Antonio Di Reda

14 December 2024 13	Napoli	1–2	Roma	Cercola
15:00 CET	Moretti 17'; Muth (yellow card) 61' (yellow-red card) 70'	Report	Giugliano 87'; Minami 90+2'	Stadium: Stadio Giuseppe Piccolo; Referee: Edoardo Gianquinto

11 January 2025 14	Roma	1–2	Inter	Rome
20:45 CET	Thøgersen 13'; Giacinti (red card) 24'	Report	Polli 11'; Serturini 55'	Stadium: Stadio Tre Fontane

18 January 2025 15	Roma	3–1	Juventus	Rome
15:30 CET	Dragoni 3'; Giugliano 72'; Linari 83' (pen.)	Report	Bonansea 59'	Stadium: Stadio Tre Fontane

25 January 2025 16	Milan	3–2	Roma	Milan
15:00 CET	Arrigoni 36'; Koivisto 47'; Cernoia 55'	Report	Greggi 32'; Corelli 38'	Stadium: Centro Sportivo Peppino Vismara; Referee: Ciro Aldi

1 February 2025 17	Roma	4–0	Sampdoria	Rome
15:45 CET	Giugliano 18' 41'; Corelli 55'; Haavi 62'	Report		Stadium: Stadio Tre Fontane; Referee: Maria Marotta

9 February 2025 18	Fiorentina	0–0	Roma	Bagno a Ripoli
15:00 CET		Report		Stadium: Stadio Curva Fiesole - Viola Park; Referee: Stefano Striamo

==== Championship round Table ====
Pos	Team	Pld	W	D	L	GF	GA	GD	Pts	Qualification
1	Juventus (C)	26	17	4	5	64	31	+33	55	Qualification for the Champions League league stage
2	Inter Milan	26	15	6	5	50	26	+24	51	Qualification for the Champions League first round
3	Roma	26	13	6	7	49	36	+13	45	Qualification for the Champions League first round
4	Fiorentina	26	12	5	9	36	34	+2	41	
5	Milan	26	9	8	9	42	46	−4	35	

Source: FIGC.it
Rules for classification: Tiebreakers
(C) Champions

==== Results summary ====
Overall								Home						Away					
Pld	W	D	L	GF	GA	GD	Pts	W	D	L	GF	GA	GD	W	D	L	GF	GA	GD
8	3	1	4	13	16	−3	10	2	1	1	8	6	+2	1	0	3	5	10	−5

Last updated: 25 January 2025.

==== Results by matchday ====
Matchday	1	2	3	4	5	6	7	8
Ground	A	H	A	H	H	A	H	A
Result	L	W	L	W	L	L	D	W
Position	3	3	3	3	3	3	3	3

A = Away; H = Home; W = Win; D = Draw; L = Loss; P = Postponed

==== Matches ====
2 March 2025 19	Juventus	4–3	Roma	Biella
15:30 CET	Harviken 19'; Girelli 25' 54' 60'	Report	Minami 22'; Haavi 24'; Viens 57'	Stadium: Stadio La Marmora-Pozzo; Referee: Valerio Pezzopane

9 March 2025 20	Roma	2–1	Inter	Rome
12:30 CET	Giugliano 68' (pen.); Di Guglielmo 90+5'	Report	Wullaert 6'	Stadium: Stadio Tre Fontane; Referee: Silvia Gasperotti

22 March 2025 21	Milan	3–1	Roma	Milan
16:00 CET	Ijeh 28'; Dompig 62'; Arrigoni 90+5'	Report	Viens 4'	Stadium: Centro Sportivo Peppino Vismara; Referee: Mattia Drigo

29 March 2025 22	Roma	2–0	Fiorentina	Rome
15:00 CET	Pandini 5'; Minami 41'	Report		Stadium: Stadio Tre Fontane; Referee: Enrico Gemelli

13 April 2025 23	Roma	1–2	Juventus	Rome
11:30 CEST	Giacinti 83'	Report	Godø 9'; Cantore 31'	Stadium: Stadio Tre Fontane; Referee: Maria Sole Ferrieri Caputi

19 April 2025 24	Inter	3–0	Roma	Milan
15:00 CEST	Polli 6'; Troelsgaard 72' (o.g.); Bartoli 80'	Report		Stadium: Arena Civica; Referee: Maria Marotta

4 May 2025 25	Roma	3–3	Milan	Rome
12:30 CEST	Giacinti 5'; Giugliano 28' (pen.); Kühl 47'	Report	Mesjasz 54'; Ijeh 59' 90+2'	Stadium: Stadio Tre Fontane; Referee: Ciro Aldi

10 May 2025 26	Fiorentina	0–1	Roma	Bagno a Ripoli
15:00 CEST		Report	Giugliano 48' (pen.)	Stadium: Stadio Curva Fiesole - Viola Park; Referee: Filippo Colaninno

=== Coppa Italia ===
6 November 2025 Round of 16	Bologna	0–6	Roma	Bologna
12:30 CET		Report	Glionna 18'; Dragoni 30'; Kumagai 73'; Corelli 78'; Haavi 88'; Greggi 90+3'	Stadium: Centro Sportivo Bonarelli

15 January 2025 Quarter-Finals	Napoli	0–1	Roma	Naples
20:45 CET		Report	Dragoni 73'	Stadium: Stadio Giuseppe Piccolo; Referee: Nicolò Dorillo

29 January 2025 Quarter-Finals	Roma	2–2	Napoli	Rome
18:00 CET	Glionna 62'; Linari 90+5'	Report	Andrup 66'; Sciabica 90'	Stadium: Stadio Tre Fontane; Referee: Riccardo Tropiano

15 February 2025 Semi-Finals	Sassuolo	1–3	Roma	Reggio Emilia
12:30 CET	Mihelič 86'	Report	Viens 3'; Corelli 26'; Giugliano 74'	Stadium: Stadio Enzo Ricci; Referee: Jules Roland Andeng Tona Mbei

5 March 2025 Semi-Finals	Roma	3–0	Sassuolo	Rome
18:00 CET	Pilgrim 31'; Giacinti 39' 64'	Report		Stadium: Stadio Tre Fontane; Referee: Francesco Zago

17 May 2025 Final	Juventus	4–0	Roma	Como
18:00 CEST	Girelli 13' 34'; Cantore 21'; Thomas 30'	Report		Stadium: Stadio Comunale G. Sinigaglia; Referee: Andrea Colombo

=== Supercoppa ===
6 January 2025 Final	Roma	3–1	ACF Fiorentina	La Spezia
15:30 CET	Glionna 17'; Valentina Giacinti 64'; Corelli 89'	Report	Janogy 60'	Stadium: Stadio Alberto Picco; Referee: Silvia Gasperotti di Rovereto

=== UEFA Women's Champions League ===
Having won the 2023–24 Serie A (women), Roma will enter the Champions League in the second qualifying round.

==== Second qualifying round ====
18 September 2024 First leg	Roma	3–1	Servette (Switzerland)	Rome
14:30 CEST	Minami 38'; Giugliano (yellow card) 45'; Linari (yellow card) 60'; Viens 85' 90+3'	Report	Bourma (yellow card) 43'; Serrano (yellow card) 45'; Korhonen 55'	Stadium: Stadio Tre Fontane; Attendance: 1,199; Referee: Abigail Byrne (England)

26 September 2024 Second leg	Servette (Switzerland)	2–7	Roma	Geneva
19:00 CEST	Muratovic 23'; Marchão 59'	Report	Haavi 12'; Dragoni 14' 56'; Giugliano 42'; Kumagai 45+1'; Giacinti 62' 90'; Corelli (yellow card) 71'	Stadium: Stade de Genève; Attendance: 6,107; Referee: Jelena Cvetković (Serbia)

==== Group stage ====
Pos	Team	Pld	W	D	L	GF	GA	GD	Pts	Qualification	LYO	WOL	ROM	GAL
1	(France) Lyon	6	6	0	0	19	1	+18	18	Advance to quarter-finals	—	1–0	4–1	3–0
2	(Germany) VfL Wolfsburg	6	3	0	3	16	5	+11	9 (Note: Wolfsburg 3 Pts, +4 GD; Roma 3 Pts, −4 GD.)	Advance to quarter-finals	0–2	—	6–1	5–0
3	(Italy) Roma	6	3	0	3	12	14	−2	9		0–3	1–0	—	3–0
4	(Turkey) Galatasaray	6	0	0	6	1	28	−27	0		0–6	0–5	1–6	—

Source: UEFA
Rules for classification: Group stage tiebreakers
Notes:

8 October 2024 1	Roma (Italy)	1–0	(Germany) VfL Wolfsburg	Stadio Tre Fontane, Rome
18:45 CEST	Giugliano 14' (pen.)	Report	Wilms (yellow card) 71'	Attendance: 1,345; Referee: Catarina Campos (Portugal)

17 October 2024 2	Galatasaray (Turkey)	1–6	(Italy) Roma	Atatürk Olympic Stadium, Istanbul
18:45 CEST	Stašková 76'	Report	Cissoko 7' (yellow card) 81'; Giacinti 24'; Haavi 54'; Giugliano (penalty missed) 45+1' 59'; Pandini 84'; Corelli 87'	Attendance: 2,697; Referee: Tess Olofsson (Sweden)

13 November 2024 3	Roma (Italy)	0–3	(France) Lyon	Stadio Tre Fontane, Rome
21:00 CET		Report	Dumornay 36' 42'; Gilles 52' (yellow card) 90+1'; Egurrola (yellow card) 55'; Svava (yellow card) 60'	Attendance: 1,906; Referee: Abigail Byrne (England)

20 November 2024 4	Lyon (France)	4–1	(Italy) Roma	Parc Olympique Lyonnais, Décines-Charpieu
21:00 CET	Diani 77' 79'; Le Sommer 89'; Renard 90+2'	Report	Dragoni 74'	Attendance: 4,060; Referee: Marta Huerta de Aza (Spain)

11 December 2024 5	VfL Wolfsburg (Germany)	6–1	(Italy) Roma	AOK Stadion, Wolfsburg
18:45 CET	Popp 6'; Beerensteyn 65'; Jónsdóttir 68' 85' 89' 90+2'	Report	Giacinti 56'	Attendance: 2,612; Referee: Ivana Martinčić (Croatia)

17 December 2024 6	Roma (Italy)	3–0	(Turkey) Galatasaray	Stadio Tre Fontane, Rome
21:00 CET	Corelli 9' (yellow card) 58'; Ventriglia 82'; Linari 90+3'	Report		Attendance: 1,142; Referee: Shona Shukrula (Netherlands)
