= 2024–25 Coppa Italia (women) =

Tournament details
- Country: Italy
- Dates: 25 August 2024 – 17 May 2025
- Teams: 26

Final positions
- Champions: Juventus (4th title)
- Runners-up: Roma
- Goals scored in penalty shoot-outs not included.

The 2024–25 season of the Coppa Italia, also known as Coppa Italia Frecciarossa for sponsorship reasons, was the 53rd season of Italy's national women's football cup competition.

The dates and seeding for the 2024–25 season was announced on 31 July 2024. The competition opened on 25 August 2024 with the preliminary round.

AS Roma were the defending champions, having won their second Coppa Italia in the 2023–24 season.

Juventus won their fourth Coppa Italia title and the domestic double, having also won the 2024–25 Serie A Femminile. Juventus defeated Roma 4–0 in the final at Stadio Giuseppe Sinigaglia in Como on 17 May.

== Teams ==
Rank	Team	2023–24 league result	Previous appearances in final^{1}
Pool 1 (Seeded into Round 2)
1	AS Roma	Serie A, 1st	4 (**2020–21**, 2021–22, 2022–23, **2023–24**)
2	Juventus	Serie A, 2nd	3 (**2018–19**, **2021–22**, **2022–23**)
3	ACF Fiorentina	Serie A, 3rd	5 (1971, **2016–16**, **2017–18**, 2018–19, 2023–24)
4	Sassuolo	Serie A, 4th	0
5	Inter Milan	Serie A, 5th	0
6	AC Milan	Serie A, 6th	1 (2020–21)
7	FC Como	Serie A, 7th	0
8	Sampdoria	Serie A, 8th	0
Pool 2 (Seeded into Round 1)
9	Napoli	Serie A, 9th	1 (2011–12)
10	SS Lazio	Serie B, 1st	11 (1972, 1973, 1974, **1977**, 1978, 1979, **1985**, 1985–86, **1998–99**, 2001–02, **2002–03**)
11	Ternana	Serie B, 2nd	0
12	Parma	Serie B, 3rd	0
13	Cesena FC	Serie B, 4th	0
14	H&D Chievo Verona	Serie B, 5th	0
15	Hellas Verona	Serie B, 6th	6 (2000–01, **2005–06**, 2006–07, **2008–09**, 2012–13, 2015–16)
16	Genoa CFC	Serie B, 7th	0
17	Bologna FC	Serie B, 8th	0
18	Brescia	Serie B, 9th	5 (**2011–12**, **2014–15**, **2015–16**, 2016–17, 2017–18)
19	SS Arezzo	Serie B, 10th	0
20	Res Women	Serie B, 11th	0
21	San Marino Academy	Serie B, 12th	0
22	Freedom FC	Serie B, 13th	0
Pool 3 (Seeded into Preliminary Round)
23	FC Lumezzane	Serie C, 1st in group A	0
24	Vis Mediterranea	Serie C, 1st in group C	0
25	Pavia Academy	Serie B, 14th (Note: Orobica Bergamo and Pavia Academy were admitted to Serie B in place of Pomigliano CF, relegated from Serie A that failed to register and ASD Meran Women that has been found ineligible.)	0
26	Orobica Bergamo	Serie C, 2nd in group A	0

^{1} Bold indicates winners for that year.

== Preliminary round ==
Pool 3 teams participate in the preliminary round. The 23rd seeded FC Lumezzane meets the 26th seeded Orobica Bergamo and the 24th seeded Vis Mediterranea competes against the 25th seeded Pavia Academy.

25 August 2024	FC Lumezzane	1–3	Orobica Bergamo	Stadio Tullio Saleri, Lumezzane
17:00 CEST (UTC+2)		Report

25 August 2024	Vis Mediterranea	0–0 (7–6 p)	Pavia Academy	Stadio Comunale Sandro Pertini, Montoro
17:00 CEST (UTC+2)		Report

== Round 1 ==
The 14 teams from pool 2 compete in the first round alongside preliminary round winners. The lower ranked teams have the home advantage.

8 September 2024	Bologna FC	3–0	Genoa CFC
15:00 CEST (UTC+2)		Report

8 September 2024	Vis Mediterranea	2–5	Napoli
15:00 CEST (UTC+2)		Report

8 September 2024	San Marino Academy	0–3	Parma
15:00 CEST (UTC+2)		Report

8 September 2024	Res Women	3–4 (a.e.t.)	Cesena FC
15:00 CEST (UTC+2)		Report

8 September 2024	SS Arezzo	2–0	H&D Chievo Women
15:00 CEST (UTC+2)		Report

7 September 2024	Freedom FC	2–1 (a.e.t.)	Ternana
11:00 CEST (UTC+2)		Report

8 September 2024	Orobica Bergamo	1–2	SS Lazio
12:30 CEST (UTC+2)		Report

8 September 2024	Brescia	1–2	Hellas Verona
16:30 CEST (UTC+2)		Report

== Round 2 ==
The Round 1 winners play the teams from pool 1 in Round 2. The lower ranked teams have the home advantage.

6 November 2024 R2-1	Bologna FC	0–6	AS Roma
CEST (UTC+2)

6 November 2024 R2-2	Napoli	1–0	Sampdoria
CEST (UTC+2)

6 November 2024 R2-3	Parma	2–5	Inter Milan
CEST (UTC+2)

6 November 2024 R2-4	Cesena FC	0–2	Sassuolo
CEST (UTC+2)

6 November 2024 R2-5	SS Arezzo	0–1	Fiorentina
CEST (UTC+2)

6 November 2024 R2-6	Freedom FC	0–2	AC Milan	Stadio Fratelli Paschiero
CEST (UTC+2)			Stokić 67'; Marinelli 70'	Referee: Mazzer di Conegliano

5 November 2024 R2-7	SS Lazio	7–2	FC Como
CEST (UTC+2)

6 November 2024 R2-8	Hellas Verona	0–4	Juventus
CEST (UTC+2)

== Final rounds ==
Quarter- and semi-finals consist of two-leg match-ups, with home and away rounds for each team. The final is single-leg, played at neutral ground.

=== Bracket ===
Quarter-finals
AS Roma	1	2	3
Napoli	0	2	2
Sassuolo	1	2	3
Inter Milan	1	1	2
Fiorentina	1	2	3
AC Milan	1	0	1
Juventus	3	2	5
SS Lazio	1	3	4

Semi-finals
AS Roma	3	3	6
Sassuolo	1	0	1
Juventus	3	1	4
Fiorentina	2	0	2

Final
17 May - Stadio Giuseppe Sinigaglia
Juventus	4
AS Roma	0

=== Quarter-Final ===
Team 1	Agg.	Team 2	1st leg	2nd leg
AS Roma	3–2	Napoli	1–0	2–2
Sassuolo	3–2	Inter Milan	1–1	2–1
Fiorentina	3–1	AC Milan	1–1	2–0
Juventus	5–4	SS Lazio	3–1	2–3

15 January 2025
20:45 CET (UTC+1)
QF1 1st leg

Napoli	0–1	AS Roma
		Dragoni 73'

Stadio comunale Giuseppe Piccolo
Referee: Nicolò Dorillo
16 January 2025
19:45 CET (UTC+1)
QF2 1st leg

Inter Milan	1–1	Sassuolo
Polli 77'		Clelland 83'

Arena Civica
16 January 2025
18:00 CET (UTC+1)
QF3 1st leg

AC Milan	1–1	Fiorentina
Arrigoni 48'		Severini 32'

Centro Sportivo Vismara
Referee: Gauzolino di Torino
15 January 2025
17:00 CET (UTC+1)
QF4 1st leg

SS Lazio	1–3	Juventus
Piemonte 50'		Bonansea 41'; Vangsgaard 86'; Cantore 90+2'

Centro sportivo di Formello

29 January 2025
18:00 CET (UTC+1)
QF1 2nd leg

AS Roma	2–2	Napoli
Glionna 62'; Linari 90+5'		Andrup 66'; Sciabica 90'

Stadio Tre Fontane
Referee: Riccardo Tropiano
28 January 2025
CET (UTC+1)
QF2 2nd leg

Sassuolo	2–1	Inter Milan
De Rita 90+4'; Milinković 106' (o.g.)		Bugeja 3'

Stadio Enzo Ricci
28 January 2025
20:45 CET (UTC+1)
QF3 2nd leg

Fiorentina	2–0	AC Milan
Giuliani 31' (o.g.); Severini 76' (pen.)

Rocco B. Commisso Viola Park
Referee: Manzo from Torre Annunziata
30 January 2025
17:00 CET (UTC+1)
QF4 2nd leg

Juventus	2–3	SS Lazio
Kullberg 79', 88'		Simonetti 21', 48'; Kaján 45+1'

Stadio Vittorio Pozzo

=== Semi-Final ===
Team 1	Agg.	Team 2	1st leg	2nd leg
AS Roma	6–1	Sassuolo	3–1	3–0
Juventus	4–2	Fiorentina	3–2	1–0

15 February 2025
12:30 CET (UTC+1)
SF1 1st leg

Sassuolo	1–3	AS Roma
Mihelic 86'		Viens 3'; Corelli 26'; Giugliano 90+4'

Stadio Enzo Ricci
Referee: Jules Roland Andeng Tona Mbei
16 February 2025
15:00 CET (UTC+1)
SF2 1st leg

Fiorentina	2–3	Juventus
Bonfantini 10'; Færge 13'		Harviken 5'; Bonansea 35'; Vangsgaard 75'

Rocco B. Commisso Viola Park

5 March 2025
18:00 CET (UTC+1)
SF1 2nd leg

AS Roma	3–0	Sassuolo
Pilgrim 35'; Giacinti 39', 64'

Referee: Francesco Zago
6 March 2025
18:00 CET (UTC+1)
SF2 2nd leg

Juventus	1–0	Fiorentina
Godø 24'

Stadio Vittorio Pozzo

=== Final ===
17 May 2025
18:00 CEST (UTC+2)

Juventus	4–0	AS Roma
Girelli 13' (pen.), 34'; Cantore 21'; Thomas 30'

Stadio Giuseppe Sinigaglia
Attendance: 7,064
Referee: Andrea Colombo
