= 2024–25 Serie A (women) =

Serie A Femminile
- Season: 2024–25
- Dates: 30 August 2024 – 18 May 2025
- Champions: Juventus; 6th title
- Relegated: Sampdoria
- Champions League: Juventus; Inter Milan; Roma
- Matches: 122
- Goals: 362 (2.97 per match)
- Top goalscorer: Cristiana Girelli (19 goals)
- Biggest home win: Inter Milan 5–0 Sampdoria; 31 August 2024
- Biggest away win: Milan 0–6 Juventus; 9 February 2025
- Highest scoring: Sassuolo 3–6 Juventus; 1 September 2024
- Longest winning run: 6 matches Juventus
- Longest unbeaten run: 11 matches Juventus
- Longest winless run: 11 matches Sampdoria; Sassuolo
- Longest losing run: 6 matches Sassuolo

The 2024–25 season of the Serie A was the 58th season of Italy's top women's football league, and the 3rd season since attaining a fully professional status.

On 27 June 2024, FIGC announced that Serie A would be expanding to 12 teams, while Serie B would shrink to 14 teams starting in the 2025–26 season. Due to this, only one team got relegated to Serie B this season and there would be no relegation play-off.

The schedule for the 2024–25 Serie A was announced on 8 July 2024, with the regular season lasting from 31 August 2024 to 9 February 2025. And the championship and qualification rounds running from 1 March 2025 until 18 May 2025.

After a 2–0 win over AC Milan, it was confirmed that Juventus had won their sixth Serie A Femminile title.

== Teams ==
Locations of teams in the 2024–25 Serie A Femminile.

Team	Home city	Home ground	Capacity
Como Women	Como	Stadio Ferruccio	3,500
Fiorentina	Florence	Stadio Gino Bozzi	3,800
Inter Milan	Milan	Arena Civica	10,000
Juventus	Turin	Stadio La Marmora-Pozzo	5,210
Lazio	Rome	Centro Sportivo di Formello	3,000
Milan	Milan	Centro Sportivo Vismara	1,200
Napoli	Naples	Stadio comunale Giuseppe Piccolo	7,000
Roma	Rome	Stadio Tre Fontane	4,000
Sampdoria	Genoa	Stadio La Sciorba	4,800
Sassuolo	Sassuolo	Stadio Enzo Ricci	4,000

=== Team changes ===
Entering league	Exiting league
Promoted from 2023-24 Serie B	Relegated to 2024-25 Serie B
Lazio	Pomigliano

=== Personnel and kits ===
Team	President	Manager	Captain	Kit manufacturer	Shirt sponsors (front)	Shirt sponsors (back)	Shirt sponsors (sleeve)	Shorts sponsors
Como Women	(Italy) Stefano Verga	(Italy) Stefano Sottili	(Italy) Giulia Rizzon	Nike	WeAre8 (H & A) / Tessil-jet (T), 2 AEFFE (T)	Casati Flock&Fibers	None	None
Fiorentina	(Italy) (United States) Rocco B. Commisso	(Argentina) Sebastian De La Fuente	(Spain) Verónica Boquete	Kappa	Mediacom	Yogurt Greco Altoproteico	Subbyx	Barberino Outlet
Inter Milan	(Italy) Giuseppe Marotta	(Italy) Gianpiero Piovani	(Italy) Lisa Alborghetti	Nike	Betsson.sport	U-Power	GATE.io	TIM
Juventus	(Italy) Gianluca Ferrero	(Italy) Massimiliano Canzi	(Italy) Sara Gama	Adidas	Save the Children / TikTok	Allianz / Save the Children	TIM	None
Lazio	(Italy) Claudio Lotito	(Italy) Gianluca Grassadonia	(Italy) Antonietta Castiello	Mizuno	TIM	None	Pewex Supermercati	Antica Roma
Milan	(Italy) Paolo Scaroni	(Netherlands) Suzanne Bakker	(Italy) Laura Giuliani	Puma	Banco BPM	TIM	MSC Cruises	None
Napoli	(Italy) Alessandro Maiello	(Italy) Salvatore Mango	(Italy) Paola Di Marino	Acerbis	None	None	None	None
Roma	(United States) Dan Friedkin	(Italy) Alessandro Spugna	(Italy) Manuela Giugliano	Adidas	TIM	Auberge Resorts	None	HDI Assicurazioni
Sampdoria	(Italy) Marco Lanna	(Italy) Davide Corti	(Italy) Stefania Tarenzi	Macron	Rendimax	LaMiaLiguria	None	Marco Lovati Spedizioni
Sassuolo	(Italy) Elisabetta Vignotto	(Italy) Gian Loris Rossi	(Italy) Maria Luisa Filangeri	Puma	Mapei	None	None	None

== Tiebreakers for league ranking ==
The following criteria are applied (in order from top to bottom) to determine the order of the teams in all rounds of the league:

- Total number of points;
- Total number of points obtained in head-to-head matches;
- Goal difference in all league matches;
- Number of goals scored in all league matches;
- Number of goals scored in head-to-head matches;
- Number of away goals scored in head-to-head matches;

== Regular season ==
Pos	Team	Pld	W	D	L	GF	GA	GD	Pts	Qualification
1	Juventus	18	14	3	1	51	16	+35	45	Advanced to the championship round
2	Inter Milan	18	11	5	2	34	14	+20	38	Advanced to the championship round
3	Roma	18	10	5	3	36	20	+16	35	Advanced to the championship round
4	Fiorentina	18	8	4	6	24	24	0	28	Advanced to the championship round
5	Milan	18	7	4	7	25	28	−3	25	Advanced to the championship round
6	Como	18	7	1	10	25	32	−7	22	Participates in the relegation round
7	Lazio	18	5	5	8	29	28	+1	20	Participates in the relegation round
8	Sassuolo	18	5	4	9	29	34	−5	19	Participates in the relegation round
9	Napoli	18	2	4	12	10	34	−24	10	Participates in the relegation round
10	Sampdoria	18	1	5	12	8	41	−33	8	Participates in the relegation round

Source: FIGC.it
Rules for classification: Tiebreakers

=== Results ===
Home \ Away	COM	FIO	INT	JUV	LAZ	MIL	NAP	ROM	SAM	SAS
Como		2–0	0–1	1–4	1–2	1–0	3–0	1–3	1–1	0–3
Fiorentina	3–1		2–1	0–3	3–2	2–2	1–0	0–0	4–0	1–1
Inter Milan	1–0	2–0		0–0	1–0	1–1	1–0	1–1	5–0	3–0
Juventus	4–2	4–0	2–0		3–2	3–0	1–1	2–1	3–0	2–2
Lazio	1–2	2–0	4–4	1–2		2–0	0–0	2–2	0–0	3–2
Milan	0–1	1–2	1–1	0–6	2–1		6–0	3–2	1–0	1–0
Napoli	4–2	0–0	1–4	0–3	0–4	0–1		1–2	0–1	1–0
Roma	2–1	1–0	1–2	3–1	2–1	2–1	3–1		4–0	1–1
Sampdoria	1–2	1–3	0–3	0–2	1–1	2–2	0–0	1–5		0–2
Sassuolo	2–4	1–3	1–3	3–6	3–1	2–3	2–1	1–1	3–0	

Source: FIGC.it
Legend: Blue = home team win; Yellow = draw; Red = away team win.

== Championship round ==
The points and scores from the regular season carry over to the championship round.

Pos	Team	Pld	W	D	L	GF	GA	GD	Pts	Qualification
1	Juventus (C)	26	17	4	5	64	31	+33	55	Qualification for the Champions League league phase
2	Inter Milan	26	15	6	5	50	26	+24	51	Qualification for the Champions League second qualifying round
3	Roma	26	13	6	7	49	36	+13	45	Qualification for the Champions League second qualifying round
4	Fiorentina	26	12	5	9	36	34	+2	41	
5	Milan	26	9	8	9	42	46	−4	35	

Source: FIGC.it
Rules for classification: Tiebreakers
(C) Champions

=== Results ===
Home \ Away	FIO	INT	JUV	MIL	ROM
Fiorentina		1–0	3–1	0–0	0–1
Inter Milan	1–3		3–2	3–3	3–0
Juventus	0–2	0–1		2–0	4–3
Milan	5–3	4–1	2–2		3–1
Roma	2–0	2–1	1–2	3–3	

Source: FIGC.it
Legend: Blue = home team win; Yellow = draw; Red = away team win.
For upcoming matches, an "a" indicates there is an article about the rivalry between the two participants.

== Relegation round ==
The points and scores from the regular season carry over to the relegation round.

Pos	Team	Pld	W	D	L	GF	GA	GD	Pts	Relegation
1	Lazio	26	12	5	9	52	31	+21	41	
2	Como	26	12	2	12	39	43	−4	38	
3	Sassuolo	26	10	4	12	45	49	−4	34	
4	Napoli	26	3	5	18	15	50	−35	14	
5	Sampdoria (R)	26	1	7	18	16	62	−46	10	Relegation to 2025–26 Serie B

Source: FIGC.it
Rules for classification: Tiebreakers
(R) Relegated

=== Results ===
Home \ Away	COM	LAZ	NAP	SAM	SAS
Como		0–4	3–1	2–2	3–0
Lazio	0–2		2–1	3–0	5–0
Napoli	0–2	0–4		2–1	0–1
Sampdoria	1–2	0–3	0–0		2–5
Sassuolo	3–0	0–2	3–1	4–2	

Source: FIGC.it
Legend: Blue = home team win; Yellow = draw; Red = away team win.

== Statistics ==
=== Top goalscorers ===
As of 11 November 2026

Rank	Player	Club	Goals
1	(Italy) Cristiana Girelli	Juventus	19
2	(Italy) Martina Piemonte	Lazio	17
3	(Italy) Manuela Giugliano	Roma	12
3	(Sweden) Evelyn Ijeh	Milan	12
5	(France) Clarisse Le Bihan	Lazio	11
5	(Italy) Sofia Cantore	Juventus	11
5	(Italy) Nadine Nischler	FC Como	11
8	(Scotland) Lana Clelland	Sassuolo	10
8	(Germany) Gina Chmielinski	Sassuolo	10
8	(Belgium) Tessa Wullaert	Inter Milan	10

==== Hat-tricks ====
Player	For	Against	Result	Date	Round
(Spain) Eli del Estal	FC Como	Sassuolo	4-2 (A)	20 October 2024	7
(Italy) Martina Piemonte^{4}	Lazio	Inter Milan	4-4 (H)	9 February 2025	18
(Italy) Cristiana Girelli	Juventus	Milan	6-0 (A)	9 February 2025	18
(Italy) Cristiana Girelli	Juventus	AS Roma	4-3 (H)	2 March 2025	19
(Sweden) Madelen Janogy	Fiorentina	Milan	5-3 (A)	12 April 2025	23
(France) Clarisse Le Bihan	Lazio	FC Como	4-0 (A)	27 April 2025	25

(H) – Home; (A) – Away
^{4} – Player scored four goals.

=== Clean sheets ===
As of 24 January 2025

Rank	Player	Club	Clean sheets
1	(Iceland) Cecilía Rúnarsdóttir	Inter Milan	7
2	(France) Pauline Peyraud-Magnin	Juventus	6
3	(Croatia) Doris Bačić	Napoli	4
3	(Serbia) Sara Cetinja	SS Lazio	4
3	(Italy) Laura Giuliani	AC Milan	4
3	(Italy) Astrid Gilardi	SSD FC Como	4
7	(Norway) Cecilie Fiskerstrand	Fiorentina	3
8	(Italy) Amanda Tampieri	UC Sampdoria	2
8	(Canada) Lysianne Proulx	Juventus	2
10	(Italy) Rachele Baldi	Inter Milan	1
10	(France) Solène Durand	US Sassuolo	1
10	(Romania) Camelia Ceasar	AS Roma	1

=== Disciplinary record ===
As of 25 November 2024

	Most yellow cards	Total	Most red cards	Total	Ref.
Player	(Italy) Paola Di Marino (Napoli) (Italy) Martina Toniolo (Fiorentina)	4	(Italy) Federica Cafferata (Sampdoria) (United States) Natalie Muth (Napoli) (Belgium) Davina Philtjens (Sassuolo) (Italy) Martina Piemonte (Lazio) (Italy) Elena Pisani (Sampdoria)	1	
Club	Sassuolo	21	Napoli Sampdoria	2	

== Awards ==
=== Seasonal awards ===
Award	Winner	Club	Ref.
Most Valuable Player	(Italy) Cristiana Girelli	Juventus	
Best Young Player	(Italy) Giorgia Arrigoni	Milan	
Best Goalkeeper	(Iceland) Cecilía Rúnarsdóttir	Inter Milan	
Best Defender	(Spain) Ivana Andrés	Inter Milan	
Best Midfielder	(Germany) Gina Chmielinski	Sassuolo	
Best Forward	(Italy) Sofia Cantore	Juventus	

Team of the Season
Goalkeeper	(Iceland) Cecilía Rán Rúnarsdóttir (Inter Milan)			
Defenders	(Sweden) Emma Kullberg (Juventus)	(Spain) Ivana Andrés (Inter Milan)		(Italy) Martina Lenzini (Juventus)
Midfielders	(Germany) Gina Chmielinski (Sassuolo)	(Germany) Lina Magull (Inter Milan)	(Italy) Manuela Giugliano (Roma)	(France) Clarisse Le Bihan (Lazio)
Forwards	(Italy) Sofia Cantore (Juventus)	(Italy) Cristiana Girelli (Juventus)		(Italy) Martina Piemonte (Lazio)

== See also ==
- 2024–25 Coppa Italia (women)
- 2024 Supercoppa Italiana (women)
