= Alessandro Spugna =

Italian football coach

Personal information
- Date of birth: 22 November 1973 (age 52)
- Place of birth: Turin, Italy

Team information
- Current team: Napoli Women (manager)

Managerial career
- Years: Team
- 2002–2014: Torino (youth coach)
- 2014–2018: Juventus (youth coach)
- 2018–2020: Juventus Women (U-19)
- 2020–2021: Empoli Ladies
- 2021–2025: Roma Women
- 2025–2026: Sassuolo Women
- 2026–: Napoli Women

Alessandro Spugna (born 22 November 1973) is an Italian professional football manager who is the current head coach of Serie A Women club Napoli Women. He briefly enjoyed a playing career where he graduated from Torino's youth academy, before deciding to become a coach with the same academy when Spugna was 28 years old.

== Coaching career ==
After spending 12 years as a youth coach with Torino, Spugna accepted an offer to coach within the youth ranks of cross-town rivals Juventus in 2014. Spugna told the press he "needed a change of environment" when explaining his decision to join Juventus, and confirmed he turned down moves to other clubs within Italy and abroad to do so.

In 2018, Juventus were searching for a successor to the departing Juventus Women's Primavera coach Daniele Diana and chose Spugna after he had spent 4 years as a youth coach within the men's side of the club. During his two seasons with the Juventus U-19 women's team, Spugna guided his side to two successive Viareggio Women's Cup trophies.

Though Spugna never managed to win a Primavera league title with Juventus, he was credited with launching many young talents into women's senior football and accepted an offer to become the head coach of Serie A club Empoli Ladies in the summer of 2020, in time for their 2020-21 league campaign. Spugna guided Empoli to Serie A salvation and surprisingly good results in league and cup competition, notably managing Empoli's on-loan Juventus forward Benedetta Glionna to the most prolific goalscoring season of her Serie A career. Despite Empoli's success on the pitch, Spugna was suddenly fired by Empoli on 28 April 2021 before the team had finished their league season.

It was widely speculated that Empoli's decision was due to Spugna reaching a pre-contract agreement to become Roma's head coach for the following season. On 2 June 2021, Roma announced they had promoted head coach Betty Bavagnoli to a new role as their Head of Women's Sport while Alessandro Spugna was appointed the new head coach of the Roma women's team On 5 July 2021, Roma announced the permanent signing of Spugna's long-term protegee Benedetta Glionna which re-united the Italian forward to train under coach Spugna at the duo's third different club together. On 16 July 2021, Roma announced the signing of Italian defender Lucia Di Guglielmo from Empoli which re-united the player with Spugna.

== Coaching style ==
Spugna has defined his preferred style of play as one made of aggressive, attacking and bold football. Spugna consides himself a gestitore (talent manager) and not an integralista (system-based manager). He has claimed he has no preferred formation or system, and looks to adapt the formation to the playing talent at his disposal within any given match.

== Honours ==
- Serie A
  - Winners (2): 2022–23, 2023–24
- Coppa Italia
  - Winners (1): 2023–24
- Supercoppa Italiana
  - Winners (2): 2022, 2024
