= Mia Pante =

Canadian soccer player (born 2003)

Personal information
- Full name: Mia Tecla Christina Pante
- Date of birth: March 25, 2003 (age 23)
- Place of birth: North Vancouver, British Columbia, Canada
- Height: 5 ft 7 in (1.70 m)
- Position: Midfielder

Team information
- Current team: Vancouver Rise FC (on loan from AS Roma)
- Number: 22

Youth career
- 2008–2013: North Shore Girls SC
- 2014–2017: Mountain United FC
- 2017–2021: Vancouver Whitecaps REX

College career
Years	Team	Apps	(Gls)
2021–2024	Texas A&M Aggies	76	(10)

Senior career*
Years	Team	Apps	(Gls)
2022	TSS FC Rovers		
2023	Nautsa’mawt FC	5	(3)
2024	Burnaby FC	3	(1)
2025–	AS Roma	6	(0)
2026–	→ Vancouver Rise FC (loan)	1	(0)

International career^{‡}
2018	Canada U15	4	(0)
2022	Canada U20	10	(1)
- * Club domestic league appearances and goals as of May 19, 2026 ‡ National team caps and goals as of August 17, 2022

Mia Tecla Christina Pante (Italian: [ˈmi.a ˈpan.te]; born March 25, 2003) is a Canadian professional soccer player who plays as a forward for Vancouver Rise FC in the Northern Super League, on loan from Italian Serie A club AS Roma.

Pante played college soccer for the Texas A&M Aggies from 2021 to 2024, where she was a three-time All-SEC Second Team selection. During her collegiate off-seasons, she played in League1 British Columbia for TSS FC Rovers in 2022, Nautsa’mawt FC in 2023, and Burnaby FC in 2024. She began her professional career with AS Roma in 2025, winning the Supercoppa Italiana the following year, before joining Vancouver Rise FC on loan in 2026.

Pante has represented Canada at the youth international level. She played in the 2018 CONCACAF Girls' U-15 Championship, participated in the 2019 FIFA Youth Cup in Zurich, and was part of Canada's squad at the 2022 CONCACAF Women's U-20 Championship, where she earned a bronze medal and helped Canada qualify for the 2022 FIFA U-20 Women's World Cup.

== Early life ==
Pante began playing youth soccer at age five with North Shore Girls SC, where she played from 2008 to 2013. She has said that her mother, who played soccer in her youth, introduced her to the sport; although her parents encouraged her to try other activities, including softball and field hockey, she remained focused on soccer.

She later played youth soccer with Mountain United FC in the EA Sports BC Soccer Premier League from 2014 to 2017, during which the club won provincial championship titles in 2016 and 2017. Pante then joined the Whitecaps FC Girls Elite in August 2017. At the time, Canada did not have a professional women's soccer league, and Pante's family travelled to Seattle so that she could watch professional women's soccer, including Seattle Reign FC matches in the National Women's Soccer League.

In 2020, she was named the Whitecaps Most Promising Female Player.

== College career ==
In 2021, Pante began attending Texas A&M University, where she played for the women's soccer team. On August 28, 2021, she scored her first collegiate goal in a 3–1 victory over the Clemson Tigers, recording a goal and an assist in the match, earning her SEC Freshman of the Week honours. At the end of her freshman season, she was named to the SEC All-Freshman Team and earned the school's Assists Leader Award after recording a team-leading eight assists.

Over the next three seasons, she was named to the All-SEC Second Team each year. In 2022, she started all 20 matches and recorded three goals and seven assists. In 2023, she appeared in 22 matches, tallying three goals and four assists, and earned the “Farmers Fight” Perseverance Award. In 2024, she transitioned to a forward role, starting all 19 matches and recording three goals and two assists. Over her four-year college career, she made 76 appearances, including 73 starts, and recorded 10 goals and 21 assists for 41 points.

== Club career ==
=== TSS FC Rovers ===
In 2022, Pante played with TSS FC Rovers in League1 British Columbia. On June 11, 2022, she scored TSS Rovers' opening goal in a 1–1 draw against the Whitecaps FC Girls Elite, striking a half-volley from outside the box in the 45th minute. Pante started the match at fullback for TSS Rovers.

=== Nautsa’mawt FC ===
In 2023, Pante played with Nautsa’mawt FC in League1 British Columbia. On June 11, 2023, she scored twice in the second half of a 3–2 victory over the Whitecaps FC Girls Elite, her former youth club, with goals in the 50th and 78th minutes securing the win for league-leaders Nautsa’mawt. Pante started the match as a forward for Nautsa’mawt.

=== Burnaby FC ===
In 2024, Pante played with Burnaby FC in League1 British Columbia during the summer of her senior year at Texas A&M. It was the third of three League1 BC clubs she represented during her college summers, following TSS FC Rovers in 2022 and Nautsa’mawt FC in 2023. Her time with Burnaby FC marked her final season of amateur soccer before signing professionally with AS Roma in January 2025.

=== AS Roma ===
In January 2025, Pante signed with Italian Serie A club AS Roma on a contract running until 30 June 2027. She made her professional debut on 15 January 2025, coming on as a substitute in Roma's 1–0 Coppa Italia quarter-final victory over Napoli in Naples. Across the 2024–25 season, Pante made three Serie A appearances and three Coppa Italia appearances, and was part of the Roma squad that won the 2024–25 Supercoppa Italiana.

In the 2025–26 season, Pante made three Serie A appearances and two Coppa Italia appearances for Roma. She featured five times in the 2025–26 UEFA Women's Champions League, making her competition debut on 18 September 2025 in Roma's third qualifying round match against Sporting CP, and provided an assist in Roma's final qualifying match for the group stage. Across all competitions for Roma, she made 15 appearances and registered two assists before departing on loan in February 2026.

=== Vancouver Rise FC (loan) ===
In February 2026, Pante was loaned to Vancouver Rise FC in the Northern Super League for the 2026 season. Rise's sporting director Stephanie Labbé said the club was bringing Pante "back to Vancouver to shine in the NSL" and described her as "a fantastic addition to our team". Rise head coach Anja Heiner-Møller described Pante as "a fast and dynamic fullback and winger, combining great technical skills with an offensive mindset". Pante said of the move: "It's an incredible feeling to be able to come home, play for Rise FC, and represent Vancouver."

Pante suffered a knee injury shortly before the club's home opener, delaying her debut. She made her Rise FC debut on 18 May 2026 in Halifax, coming on as a substitute in a 2–1 victory over Halifax Tides FC, in what marked her first professional match in Canada. Five days later, on 23 May 2026, she made her home debut at Swangard Stadium, starting in a 2–1 victory over AFC Toronto, Rise FC's first home win of the season. Playing on the left wing, Pante was a standout in the match, helping create chances throughout.

On 25 October 2026, Pante scored a brace in a 3–2 victory over Calgary Wild FC at Swangard Stadium, scoring in the 7th and 34th minutes to give Vancouver a 2–0 lead. The result moved Rise past Halifax Tides FC into fourth place, the final playoff position in the Northern Super League.

== International career ==
Pante is eligible to represent Canada and Italy at international level.

In August 2018, she made her debut in the Canada national program with the Canada U15 at the 2018 CONCACAF Girls' U-15 Championship in Bradenton, Florida, where she played as a fullback. She later earned call-ups to the Canada U17 for training camps as part of Canada's qualification attempt for the FIFA U-17 Women's World Cup, which was ultimately cancelled due to the COVID-19 pandemic. In 2019, she participated in the FIFA Blue Stars/FIFA Youth Cup in Zurich, where Canada finished third and Pante received the tournament's Sportsmanship Award.

Pante was named to the Canada U20 team for the 2022 CONCACAF Women's U-20 Championship, where she played in all seven matches as part of a backline that conceded just one goal across 630 minutes, helping Canada win a bronze medal and qualify for the 2022 FIFA U-20 Women's World Cup. She also scored a goal in Canada's victory over the Cayman Islands during the tournament. At the 2022 FIFA U-20 Women's World Cup in Costa Rica, Pante started all three of Canada's matches.

== Career statistics ==
=== Club ===
As of match played 25 October 2026

Appearances and goals by club, season and competition
Club	Season	League			National cup		Continental		Total		
Club	Season	Division	Apps	Goals	Apps	Goals	Apps	Goals	Apps	Goals	
Texas A&M Aggies	2021	NCAA Division I	19	2	—		—		19	2	
Texas A&M Aggies	2022	NCAA Division I	20	1	—		—		20	1	
Texas A&M Aggies	2023	NCAA Division I	18	4	—		—		18	4	
Texas A&M Aggies	2024	NCAA Division I	19	3	—		—		19	3	
Total			76	10	—		—		76	10	
AS Roma	2024–25	Serie A	3	0	1	0	—		4	0	
AS Roma	2025–26	Serie A	3	0	2	0	5	0	10	0	
AS Roma	Total			6	0	3	0	5	0	14	0
AS Roma	Vancouver Rise FC (loan)	2026	Northern Super League	15	3	—		—		15	3
AS Roma	Career total			97	13	3	0	5	0	105	13

== Honours ==
AS Roma

- Supercoppa Italiana: 2024–25

Canada U-20

- CONCACAF Women's U-20 Championship third place: 2022

=== Individual ===
- SEC All-Freshman Team: 2021
- All-SEC Second Team: 2022, 2023, 2024
- Texas A&M Assists Leader Award: 2021
