= Evelyne Viens =

Canadian soccer player (born 1997)

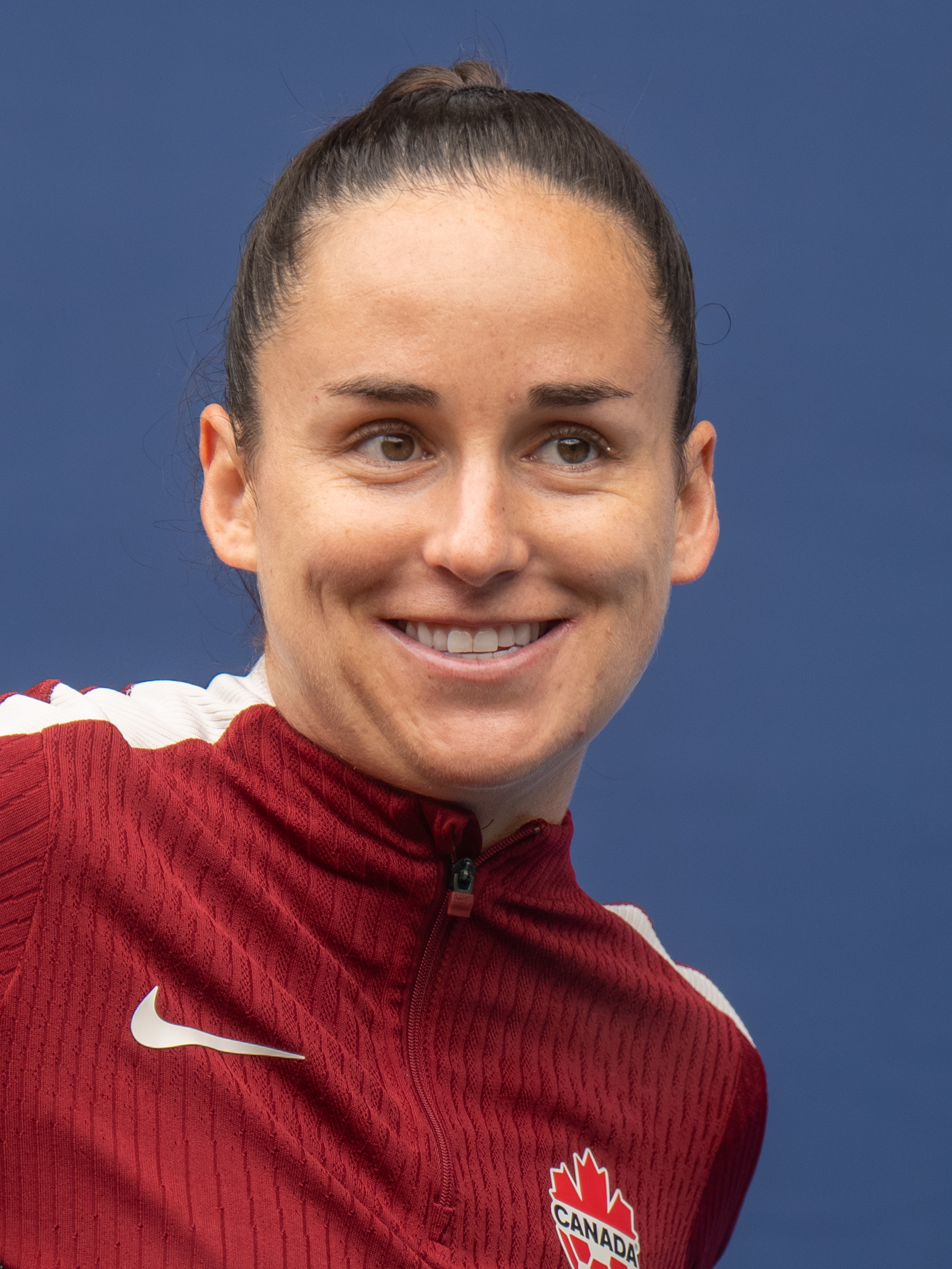
- Viens with Canada in 2026

Personal information
- Full name: Evelyne Viens
- Date of birth: February 6, 1997 (age 29)
- Place of birth: L'Ancienne-Lorette, Quebec, Canada
- Height: 5 ft 8 in (1.73 m)
- Position: Forward

Team information
- Current team: Paris FC
- Number: 14

Youth career
- AS Mistral Laurentien
- CS Haute-Saint-Charles

College career
Years	Team	Apps	(Gls)
2016–2019	South Florida Bulls	77	(73)

Senior career*
Years	Team	Apps	(Gls)
2018–2019	Dynamo de Quebec	15	(21)
2020–2022	Gotham FC (Note: Sky Blue FC changed its name to NJ/NY Gotham FC in 2021)	13	(0)
2020–2021	→ Paris FC (loan)	14	(11)
2022	→ Kristianstad (loan)	26	(21)
2023	Kristianstad	17	(12)
2023–2026	Roma	61	(22)
2026–	Paris FC	0	(0)

International career^{‡}
2021–	Canada	51	(11)
Medal record
Women's soccer
Representing Canada
Olympic Games
Gold medal – first place	2020	Team
- * Club domestic league appearances and goals as of June 19, 2026 ‡ National team caps and goals as of October 12, 2026

Evelyne Viens (Canadian French: [evlɪn vjɛ̃]; born February 6, 1997) is a Canadian professional soccer player who plays as a forward for Première Ligue club Paris FC and the Canada national team. She played college soccer at the University of South Florida.

== Early life ==
Viens began playing soccer at age five with AS Mistral Laurentien. At age 14, she received an invitation to join the Quebec provincial team, but declined the opportunity. She joined CS Haute-Saint-Charles, when she was 14.

== College career ==
Viens played for the USF Bulls women's soccer team from 2016 to 2019, where she became the team's all-time top scorer with 73 goals and was named to the NCAA All-American team three times. She also holds the school record for the most single season goals and has the most career goals in American Athletic Conference history. She scored her first collegiate goal on August 25, 2016, against Kentucky.

== Club career ==
In 2018 and 2019, she played for Dynamo de Quebec in the Première Ligue de soccer du Québec.

Sky Blue FC (later renamed NY/NJ Gotham FC) selected Viens with the fifth-overall pick in the 2020 NWSL College Draft. She made her Sky Blue FC debut on June 30, 2020 in the 2020 NWSL Challenge Cup. Viens scored her first goal for the club on July 22, 2020, in a 3–2 defeat to the Chicago Red Stars during the semi-finals of the 2020 NWSL Challenge Cup. In August 2020, Sky Blue loaned Viens to Paris FC. Viens returned to the club in March 2021.

In December 2021, Gotham FC loaned Viens to Damallsvenskan club Kristianstad for the 2022 season. In August 2022, she announced that she would not return to the United States. On September 10, she scored four goals in a league match and a hat-trick on September 24. On September 30, Kristianstad signed her to a two-year contract.

In August 2023, Viens joined AS Roma in the Italian Serie A, on a three-year contract. She was part of the squad which lost 3–2 against Juventus in the final of the inaugural Serie A Women’s Cup on September 27, 2025.

On June 19, 2026, Paris FC announced the return of Viens on a two-year contract until 2028.

== International career ==
She was named to the Canada national team for the first time for the 2021 SheBelieves Cup. She made her debut against the United States on February 18. She scored her first goal for Canada on April 9, 2021 in a 3-0 win against Wales. Four days later, she was in the starting eleven for the first time in the 2-0 win against the England national team and scored the first goal in the third minute.

On June 23, 2021, she was named to the roster for the 2020 Summer Olympics, which were postponed until the summer of 2021 because of the COVID-19 pandemic. She played in the two games in Group E against the national teams of Japan and Great Britain. Canada won gold in the games, and Viens became the first USF alum to win an Olympic medal as an athlete.

On July 9, 2023, she was nominated for the 2023 World Cup. She played in each of her team's three games, being substituted twice, and was eliminated with her team in the preliminary round.

Viens was called up to the Canada squad for the 2024 CONCACAF W Gold Cup, which Canada finished as semifinalists.

Viens was called up to the Canada squad for the 2024 Summer Olympics.

== Career statistics ==
=== Club ===
As of match played May 16, 2026

Appearances and goals by club, season and competition
Club	Season	League			Playoffs		National cup (Note: Includes NWSL Challenge Cup, Coupe de France, Svenska Cupen, Coppa Italia)		Continental		Total	
Club	Season	Division	Apps	Goals	Apps	Goals	Apps	Goals	Apps	Goals	Apps	Goals
Dynamo de Quebec	2018	PLSQ	7	8	—		—		—		7	8
Dynamo de Quebec	2019	PLSQ	8	13	—		—		—		8	13
Dynamo de Quebec	Total		15	21	—		—		—		15	21
NJ/NY Gotham FC	2020	NWSL	0	0	0	0	6	1	—		6	1
NJ/NY Gotham FC	2021	NWSL	13	0	1	0	3	1	—		17	1
NJ/NY Gotham FC	Total		13	0	1	0	9	2	—		23	2
Paris FC (loan)	2020–21	Division 1 Féminine	14	11	—		1	0	—		15	11
Kristianstad (loan)	2022	Damallsvenskan	26	21	—		4	3	2	1	32	25
Kristianstad	2023	Damallsvenskan	17	12	—		5	4	—		22	16
Kristianstad	Total		43	33	—		9	7	2	1	54	41
Roma	2023–24	Serie A	24	13	—		5	2	8	3	37	18
Roma	2024–25	Serie A	16	6	—		0	0	5	2	21	8
Roma	2025–26	Serie A	21	3	—		0	0	5	5	26	8
Roma	Total		61	22	—		5	2	18	10	84	35
Career total			146	86	1	0	24	11	20	11	201	109

=== International goals ===
Scores and results list Canada's goal tally first, score column indicates score after each Viens goal.

List of international goals scored by Evelyne Viens
No.	Date	Venue	Opponent	Score	Result	Competition
1	April 9, 2021	Cardiff City Stadium, Cardiff, Wales	Wales	2–0	3–0	Friendly
2	April 13, 2021	Bet365 Stadium, Stoke-on-Trent, England	England	1–0	2–0	Friendly
3	October 6, 2022	Estadio Municipal de Chapín, Jerez, Spain	Morocco	2–0	4–0	Friendly
4	February 19, 2023	Geodis Park, Nashville, United States	Brazil	2–0	2–0	2023 SheBelieves Cup
5	March 2, 2024	BMO Stadium, Los Angeles, United States	Costa Rica	1–0	1–0 (a.e.t.)	2024 CONCACAF W Gold Cup
6	July 25, 2024	Stade Geoffroy-Guichard, Saint-Étienne, France	New Zealand	2–1	2–1	2024 Summer Olympics
7	June 3, 2025	Saputo Stadium, Montréal, Canada	Haiti	1–0	3–1	Friendly
8	June 3, 2025	Saputo Stadium, Montréal, Canada	Haiti	3–0	3–1	Friendly
9	April 14, 2026	Arena Pantanal, Cuiabá, Brazil	South Korea	1–0	3–1	2026 FIFA Series
10	June 9, 2026	Estadio Piedades de Santa Ana, Santa Ana, Costa Rica	Costa Rica	1–0	6–0	Friendly
11	October 12, 2026	BMO Field, Toronto, Canada	Denmark	2–3	3–4	Friendly

== Honours ==
South Florida Bulls

- American Athletic Conference Champion: 2017–19

Dynamo de Quebec

- PLSQ Championship: 2018

Roma

- Serie A: 2023–24, 2025–26
- Coppa Italia: 2023–24, 2025–26
- Supercoppa Italiana: 2024
- Serie A Women's Cup runner-up: 2025

Canada

- Summer Olympics: 2021

Individual

- PLSQ Golden Boot: 2018
- Second Team All-American: 2019
- Third Team All-American: 2017–18
- Conference Offensive Player of the Year: 2018–19
- First Team All-Conference: 2017–19
- Serie A Best Forward: 2023–24
- Serie A top scorer: 2023–24
- Serie A Team of the Season: 2023–24
- AIC Serie A Women's Team of the Year: 2023–24
