= Shemar Turner =

American football player (born 2003)

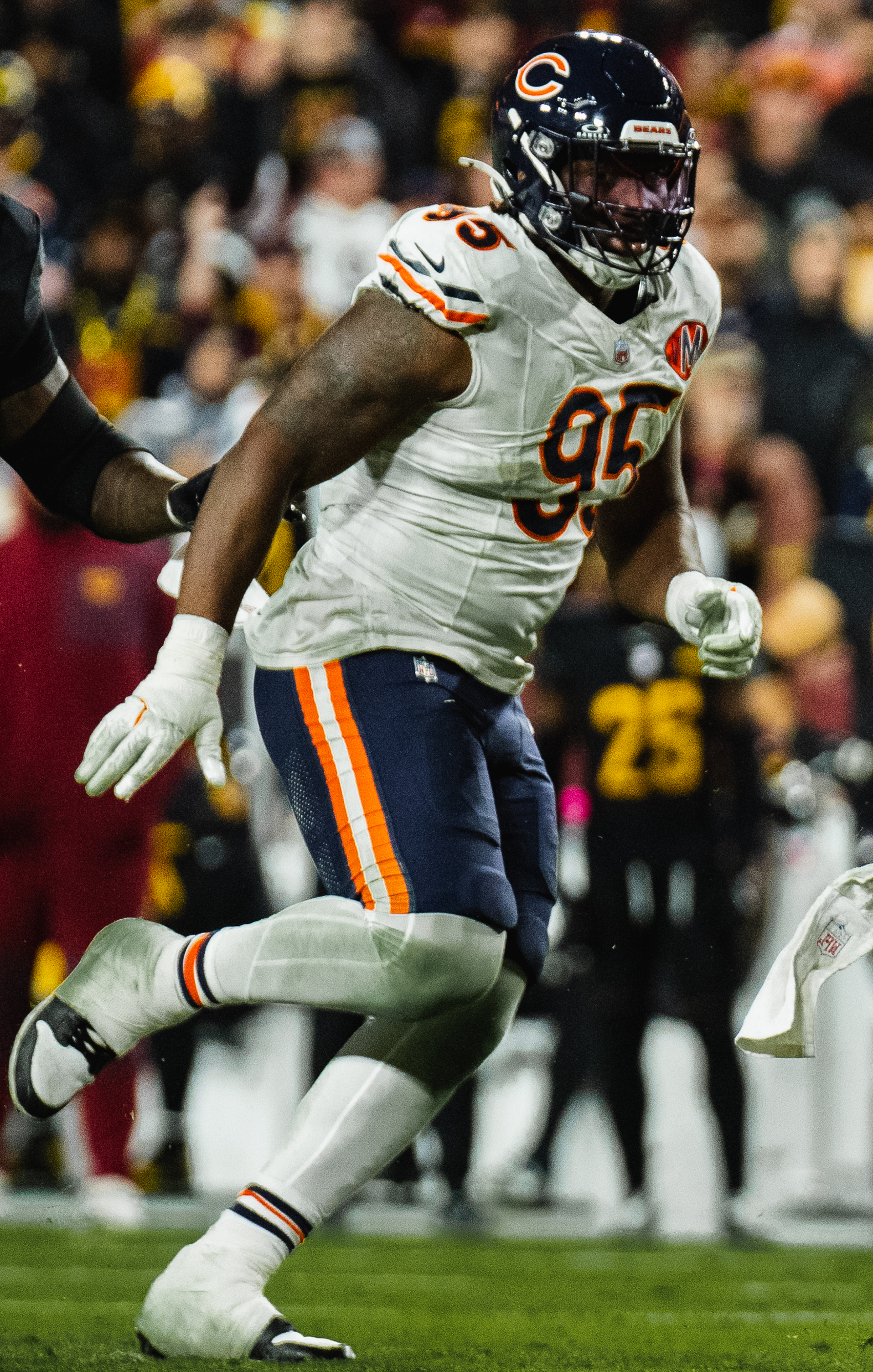
- Turner with the Chicago Bears in 2025

No. 95 – Chicago Bears
- Position: Defensive tackle
- Roster status: Active

Personal information
- Born: January 14, 2003 (age 23)
- Listed height: 6 ft 3 in (1.91 m)
- Listed weight: 293 lb (133 kg)

Career information
- High school: DeSoto (TX)
- College: Texas A&M (2021–2024)
- NFL draft: 2025: 2nd round, 62nd overall pick

Career history
- Chicago Bears (2025–present)

Awards and highlights
- Second-team All-SEC (2023)

Career NFL statistics as of Week 9, 2026
- Total tackles: 11
- Sacks: 1.0
- Stats at Pro Football Reference

Shemar Turner (born January 14, 2003) is an American professional football defensive lineman for the Chicago Bears of the National Football League (NFL). He played college football for the Texas A&M Aggies and was selected by the Bears in the second round of the 2025 NFL draft.

== Early life ==
Turner attended DeSoto High School in DeSoto, Texas. As a senior, he had 76 tackles and 12.5 sacks. Turner was selected to the 2021 Under Armour All-America game. He committed to Texas A&M University to play college football.

== College career ==
In his first career collegiate game as a freshman at Texas A&M in 2021, Turner had four tackles and 1.5 sacks. For the season he had nine tackles over eight games. As a sophomore in 2022, he started 11 games and recorded 32 tackles and 0.5 sacks. As a 12-game starter his junior year in 2023, Turner had 33 tackles and six sacks.

He returned to Texas A&M for his senior season in 2024. Before the season, he was named to the Bronko Nagurski Trophy preseason watch list. Turner started all 12 regular-season games at defensive tackle, recording seven tackles in the season opener against Notre Dame and finishing the year with 36 tackles, 5.5 tackles for loss, two sacks and a forced fumble. He withdrew from the Senior Bowl due to an injury and declared for the 2025 NFL draft.

Over his four seasons at Texas A&M, Turner appeared in 43 games with 35 starts, totaling 115 tackles, 10 sacks and three forced fumbles. His honors include Coaches' Freshman All-SEC in 2021 and second-team All-SEC in 2023, as well as the team's Defensive Trenches Award at the 2023 team banquet.

== Professional career ==
Pre-draft measurables
Height	Weight	Arm length	Hand span	Wingspan
6 ft 3 1/8 in (1.91 m)	290 lb (132 kg)	33 5/8 in (0.85 m)	10 1/4 in (0.26 m)	6 ft 9 1/8 in (2.06 m)
All values from NFL Combine

Turner was selected by the Chicago Bears with the 62nd pick in the second round of the 2025 NFL draft. On July 17, 2025, Turner signed his four-year rookie contract. In Week 8 against the Baltimore Ravens, Turner suffered a torn ACL, causing him to be placed on season-ending injured reserve.

Turner began the 2026 season on the PUP list due to his knee injury. He was activated on October 13, 2026. He recorded his first career sack on Baker Mayfield in the 27–24 win over the Tampa Bay Buccaneers.
