= Giulia Dragoni =

Italian footballer (born 2006)

- Dragoni in 2026

Personal information
- Date of birth: 7 November 2006 (age 20)
- Place of birth: Milan, Italy
- Height: 1.65 m (5 ft 5 in)
- Positions: Central midfielder; right winger

Team information
- Current team: Chelsea
- Number: 16

Youth career
- 2015–2020: Pro Sesto
- 2020–2022: Inter Milan

Senior career*
Years	Team	Apps	(Gls)
2022–2023	Inter Milan	4	(0)
2023–2024	Barcelona B	31	(8)
2023–2026	Barcelona	6	(0)
2024–2026	→ Roma (loan)	43	(8)
2026–	Chelsea	6	(1)

International career^{‡}
2021–2022	Italy U16	3	(1)
2021–2023	Italy U17	16	(8)
2022–2023	Italy U19	5	(2)
2023–	Italy	25	(0)
- * Club domestic league appearances and goals as of 15:30, 21 November 2026 (UTC) ‡ National team caps and goals as of 15:30, 11 October 2026 (UTC)

Giulia Dragoni (Italian: [ˈdʒuːlja draˈɡoːni]; born 7 November 2006) is an Italian professional footballer who plays as a central midfielder or right winger for Women's Super League club Chelsea and the Italy national team.

== Club career ==
=== Early life and Inter Milan ===
Born in Milan, Italy, Dragoni started playing football at the age of four, joining grassroots club Franco Scarioni, before moving to Cimiano, and then entering the junior academy of Pro Sesto in 2015. Here, she first came to prominence for her performances in mixed-sex junior championships, where she played until 2019, earning the nickname "Little Messi".

Having first joined Inter Milan on trial for a youth tournament in 2018, Dragoni officially entered the club's youth sector in the summer of 2020. During the 2020–21 campaign, following the halt of several youth leagues due to the consequences of the COVID-19 pandemic, she was promoted to Inter's under-19 squad, aged just 14, and contributed to a third-place finish in the national championship.

Having been promoted to Inter's first team at the start of the 2022–23 season, under head coach Rita Guarino, Dragoni made her professional debut on 20 November 2022, coming in as a substitute for Ghoutia Karchouni in the 74th minute of a goalless league draw against Fiorentina. Having just turned 16 years old, she became the youngest player to ever feature in a Serie A match since the league had achieved full-time professional status. She went on to make three more appearances for Inter's senior team before the end of 2022.

=== Barcelona ===
==== 2022–23 season ====
On 31 January 2023, Dragoni officially joined Spanish side Barcelona on a permanent deal, signing a contract until June 2025. In the process, she became the first non-Spanish member of the women's team setup to reside at La Masia. Having been registered for the club's reserve team, Barcelona B, she scored her first goal for the side on 5 March, in a 3–0 league win over Athletic B. In her first season at the club, she helped Barcelona B win the second-tier title, having scored four goals in ten matches; she was also included in the first team's title-winning Champions League squad, despite not featuring in any of their matches.

==== 2023–24 season ====
At the start of the 2023–24 season, Dragoni was still primarily part of Barcelona B but was included as a regular training player of the first team. She made her first-team debut on 26 November 2023, coming on as a substitute for Mariona Caldentey in the 83rd minute of a 4–0 Liga F win over Athletic Club. In the process, at 17 years and 19 days, she became the youngest non-Spanish player to make her debut for a senior Barcelona team (in women's or men's football). On 13 December, she made her Champions League debut, coming on for Esmee Brugts in the 78th minute of a 6–0 win over FC Rosengård in the group stage, and a month later she made her first start and scored her first goal for Barcelona's first team, opening the scoring in a 6–0 Copa de la Reina win over Fundación Albacete.

Barcelona completed a quadruple, with Dragoni becoming the first Italian player to win the Women's Champions League, also winning the league title, the Copa de la Reina and the Supercopa. While she was given few opportunities to play for the first team, Spanish newspaper Sport stated that she "brought something different" every time she featured for Barcelona.

==== Loan to Roma ====
On 17 July 2024, Dragoni renewed her contract with Barcelona until 2027, and subsequently joined Serie A club Roma on a season-long loan. Dragoni made her Serie A debut with Roma on 30 August 2024, coming on as a substitute for Benedetta Glionna in the 58th minute of a 2–2 draw with Lazio.

=== Chelsea ===
On 31 July 2026, Dragoni joined Women's Super League club Chelsea, signing a contract until 2030.

== International career ==
Dragoni has represented Italy at various youth international levels, having played for the under-16, under-17 and under-19 national teams.

In March 2023 she received her first call-up to the Italian senior national team for the friendly match against Colombia. In June of the same year, she was included in the preliminary squad for the 2023 FIFA World Cup by head coach Milena Bertolini. She subsequently made her debut for the Azzurre on 1 July, coming on as a substitute in the second half of a friendly match against Morocco, which ended in a goalless draw: at 16 years and 236 days, she became the youngest person to represent an Italian senior national football team in the 21st century, but did not beat the all-time record, originally established by Carolina Morace in 1978.

The following day, she was officially included in the final 23-player squad for the 2023 FIFA World Cup in Australia and New Zealand, aged just 16; in the process, she became the second youngest player to get called up for the tournament, behind only Casey Phair. On 24 July 2023, Dragoni started in a 1–0 group stage win over Argentina: at 16 years and 259 days, she became the youngest player to ever represent the Azzurre in the competition's history, a record that previously belonged to Rita Guarino, while also overtaking Giuseppe Bergomi as Italy's youngest player to take part in any World Cup match, including both men's and women's football. She also became the second-youngest European player to feature in a FIFA Women's World Cup game.

== Style of play ==
Dragoni mainly operates as a midfielder in the mezzala role; she is best known for her dribbling skills, as well as her ball control, her passing and her tactical intelligence.

== Career statistics ==
=== Club ===
As of match played 21 November 2026

Appearances and goals by club, season and competition
Club	Season	League			Cup (Note: Appearances in Copa de la Reina and Coppa Italia)		Continental (Note: Appearances in UEFA Women's Champions League)		Other		Total	
Club	Season	Division	Apps	Goals	Apps	Goals	Apps	Goals	Apps	Goals	Apps	Goals
Inter Milan	2022–23	Serie A	4	0	0	0	–		–		4	0
Barcelona B	2022–23	Primera Federación	10	4	–		–		–		10	4
Barcelona B	2023–24	Primera Federación	14	2	–		–		–		14	2
Barcelona B	Total		24	6	–		–		–		24	6
Barcelona	2023–24	Liga F	6	0	3	1	1	0	0	0	10	1
Roma (loan)	2024–25	Serie A	21	1	5	2	6	3	–		32	6
Roma (loan)	2025–26	Serie A	22	7	5	0	6	1	1 (Note: Appearance in Supercoppa Italiana)	0	34	8
Roma (loan)	Total		43	8	10	2	12	4	1	0	66	14
Chelsea	2025–26	WSL	6	1	0	0	2	0	–		8	1
Career total			83	15	13	3	15	4	1	0	112	22

=== International ===
As of match played 9 October 2026

Appearances and goals by national team and year
National team	Year	Apps	Goals
Italy	2023	6	0
Italy	2024	7	0
Italy	2025	6	0
Italy	2026	6	0
Total		25	0

== Honours ==
Barcelona

- Liga F: 2023–24
- Copa de la Reina: 2023–24
- Supercopa de España: 2023–24
- UEFA Women's Champions League: 2023–24

A.S. Roma

- Serie A: 2025-26
- Coppa Italia: 2025-26
- Supercoppa Italiana: 2024

Individual

- IFFHS Women's Youth (U20) UEFA Team: 2023
- Best Italian Golden Girl: 2024
- Serie A Best Midfielder: 2025–26
- Serie A Team of the Season: 2025–26
