= 2023–24 Serie A (women) =

57th season of top women's football (soccer) league in Italy

Serie A (women)
- Season: 2023–24
- Dates: 16 September 2023 – May 2024
- Champions: Roma; 2nd title
- Relegated: Pomigliano
- Champions League: Roma; Juventus; Fiorentina
- Matches: 122
- Goals: 376 (3.08 per match)
- Top goalscorer: Evelyne Viens (13 goals)

The 2023–24 Serie A was the 57th season of the women's football top-level league in Italy, and the second season to be fully professional.

On 4 November 2023, following a 0–1 loss to Sampdoria, Pomigliano announced they were withdrawing from the ongoing Serie A season with immediate effect. Four days later, the club announced they had reversed the decision to withdraw and would remain in Serie A.

== Format ==
The season takes place in two phases: in the first phase, the 10 participating teams face each other in a round-robin tournament with home and away matches for a total of 18 matchdays. In the second phase the top-five ranked teams qualify to the championship round (poule scudetto), while the last-five ranked teams play the relegation round. Each team starts in the second phase with the points earned during the first phase. In both rounds, the five participating teams face each other in a round-robin tournament with home and away matches for a total of an additional 10 matchdays, with two rest sessions for each team. At the end of the second phase, the first ranked in the championship round is crowned champion of Italy and qualifies to the 2024–25 UEFA Women's Champions League alongside the second placed team. In the relegation round the last-ranked team is relegated directly to the Serie B, while the second-last team plays the second-placed in the Serie B for a place in the 2024–25 Serie A.

== Teams ==
Locations of the 2023–24 Serie A teams

=== Team changes ===
Promoted from 2022–2023 Serie B	Relegated from 2022–2023 Serie A
Napoli	Parma

=== Stadiums and locations ===
Team	Home city	Stadium	2022–23 season
Como	Como	Stadio Ferruccio (Seregno)	9th in Serie A
Fiorentina	Florence	Stadio Curva Fiesole (Viola Park)	5th in Serie A
Inter Milan	Milan	Suning Training Center in memory of Giacinto Facchetti	3rd in Serie A
Juventus	Turin	Juventus Center (Vinovo)	2nd in Serie A
Milan	Milan	Centro Sportivo Vismara	4th in Serie A
Napoli	Naples	Stadio Caduti di Brema	1st in Serie B
Pomigliano	Pomigliano	Stadio Ugo Gobbato	7th in Serie A
Roma	Rome	Stadio Tre Fontane	Champions
Sampdoria	Genoa	Stadio La Sciorba	10th in Serie A
Sassuolo	Sassuolo	Stadio Enzo Ricci	6th in Serie A

=== Personnel and kits ===
Team	President	Manager	Captain	Kit manufacturer	Shirt sponsors (front)	Shirt sponsors (back)	Shirt sponsors (sleeve)	Shorts sponsors
Como	(Italy) Stefano Verga	(Italy) Marco Bruzzano	(Italy) Giulia Rizzon	Adidas	PlaceElite, Kéramo, Nespoli & Lombardo (H)/Fox Town (A, T & F)	Acqua S. Bernardo	None	Carton & Glue Srl (H)
Fiorentina	(Italy) (United States) Rocco B. Commisso	(Argentina) Sebastian De La Fuente	(Spain) Verónica Boquete	Kappa	Mediacom	ShippyPro	None	None
Inter Milan	(China) Steven Zhang	(Italy) Rita Guarino	(Italy) Lisa Alborghetti	Nike	Paramount+	U-Power	eBay	None
Juventus	(Italy) Gianluca Ferrero	(Australia) Joe Montemurro	(Italy) Sara Gama	Adidas	Fem Gruppo GEDI	Allianz	None	None
Milan	(Italy) Paolo Scaroni	(Italy) Maurizio Ganz	(Italy) Valentina Bergamaschi	Puma	Banco BPM	None	MSC Cruises	None
Napoli	(Italy) Alessandro Maiello	(Italy) Biagio Seno	(Italy) Paola Di Marino	Jaked	Jaked, Idea Bellezza, Carpisa	Yamamay	None	PF Service
Pomigliano	(Italy) Raffaele Pipola	(Spain) Antonio Contreras Oliveira	(Italy) Gaia Apicella	Givova	Pomilia Energia	None	None	None
Roma	(United States) Dan Friedkin	(Italy) Alessandro Spugna	(Italy) Elisa Bartoli	Adidas	IBSA	Auberge Resorts	None	None
Sampdoria	(Italy) Marco Lanna	(Italy) Salvatore Mango	(Italy) Stefania Tarenzi	Macron	Banca Ifis	None	None	None
Sassuolo	(Italy) Elisabetta Vignotto	(Italy) Gianpiero Piovani	(Italy) Maria Luisa Filangeri	Puma	Mapei	None	None	None

== First phase ==
=== League table ===
Pos	Team	Pld	W	D	L	GF	GA	GD	Pts	Qualification or relegation
1	Roma	18	17	0	1	51	11	+40	51	Qualification for the championship round
2	Juventus	18	14	1	3	47	16	+31	43	Qualification for the championship round
3	Fiorentina	18	12	3	3	36	19	+17	39	Qualification for the championship round
4	Sassuolo	18	8	2	8	20	20	0	26	Qualification for the championship round
5	Inter Milan	18	8	2	8	28	29	−1	26	Qualification for the championship round
6	AC Milan	18	5	6	7	22	22	0	21	Qualification for the relegation round
7	Como	18	6	3	9	20	33	−13	21	Qualification for the relegation round
8	Sampdoria	18	5	3	10	12	29	−17	18	Qualification for the relegation round
9	Napoli	18	1	3	14	11	36	−25	6	Qualification for the relegation round
10	Pomigliano	18	1	3	14	14	46	−32	6	Qualification for the relegation round

Source: FIGC
Rules for classification: 1) Points; 2) Head-to-head points; 3) Goal difference; 4) Number of goals scored; 5) Head-to-head goal difference; 6) Head-to-head away goals scored

== Second phase ==
=== Championship round ===
Pos	Team	Pld	W	D	L	GF	GA	GD	Pts	Qualification or relegation
1	Roma (C)	26	23	1	2	74	24	+50	70	Qualification for the Champions League second round
2	Juventus	26	19	2	5	65	27	+38	59	Qualification for the Champions League second round
3	Fiorentina	26	12	6	8	42	40	+2	42	Qualification for the Champions League first round
4	Sassuolo	26	11	3	12	39	41	−2	36	
5	Inter Milan	26	10	4	12	45	46	−1	34	

Updated to match(es) played on 19 May 2024. Source: FIGC
Rules for classification: 1) Points; 2) Head-to-head points; 3) Goal difference; 4) Number of goals scored; 5) Head-to-head goal difference; 6) Head-to-head away goals scored
(C) Champions

=== Relegation round ===
Pos	Team	Pld	W	D	L	GF	GA	GD	Pts	Qualification or relegation
1	AC Milan	26	11	8	7	43	30	+13	41	
2	Como	26	9	5	12	30	43	−13	32	
3	Sampdoria	26	8	4	14	25	42	−17	28	
4	Napoli (O)	26	2	7	17	20	48	−28	13	Qualification for the relegation play-offs
5	Pomigliano (R)	26	2	6	18	23	65	−42	12	Relegation to Serie B

Updated to match(es) played on 19 May 2024. Source: FIGC
Rules for classification: 1) Points; 2) Head-to-head points; 3) Goal difference; 4) Number of goals scored; 5) Head-to-head goal difference; 6) Head-to-head away goals scored
(O) Play-off winners; (R) Relegated

== Season statistics ==
As of 19 May 2024

=== Top scorers ===
Rank	Player	Club	Goals
1	(Canada) Evelyne Viens	Roma	13
2	(Italy) Valentina Giacinti	Roma	12
3	(Italy) Cristiana Girelli	Juventus	11
4	(Nigeria) Jennifer Echegini	Juventus	10
4	(Italy) Manuela Giugliano	Roma	10
6	(Spain) Verónica Boquete	Fiorentina	9
6	(Scotland) Lana Clelland	Sassuolo	9
6	(Germany) Lina Magull	Inter Milan	9
8	(Italy) Agnese Bonfantini	Inter Milan	8
8	(Italy) Victoria DellaPeruta	Sampdoria	8
8	(France) Lindsey Thomas	Juventus	8

=== Top assists ===
Rank	Player	Club	Assists
1	(Spain) Verónica Boquete	Fiorentina	8
2	(Germany) Gina Chmielinski	Napoli	7
2	(Italy) Valentina Giacinti	Roma	7
2	(Italy) Manuela Giugliano	Roma	7
2	(Norway) Emilie Haavi	Roma	7
6	(Netherlands) Lineth Beerensteyn	Juventus	6
6	(Italy) Arianna Caruso	Juventus	6
6	(France) Maëlle Garbino	Juventus	6
6	(Canada) Evelyne Viens	Roma	6
10	(Italy) Chiara Beccari	Sassuolo	5
10	(Italy) Lisa Boattin	Juventus	5
10	(Italy) Michela Cambiaghi	Inter Milan	5
10	(Italy) Emma Severini	Fiorentina	5

=== Clean sheets ===
Rank	Player	Club	Clean Sheets
1	(France) Solene Durand	Sassuolo	9
1	(Italy) Amanda Tampieri	Sampdoria	9
3	(Romania) Camelia Ceasar	Roma	8
3	(France) Pauline Peyraud-Magnin	Juventus	8
5	(Serbia) Sara Cetinja	Inter	5
5	(Finland) Tinja-Riikka Korpela	Roma	5
7	(Italy) Laura Giugliani	AC Milan	4
7	(Slovakia) Mária Korenčiová	Como	4
9	(Croatia) Doris Bačić	Napoli	3
9	(Italy) Rachele Baldi	Fiorentina	3
9	(Italy) Katja Schroffenegger	Fiorentina	3

== Awards ==
=== Seasonal awards ===
Award	Winner	Club	Ref.
Most Valuable Player	(Italy) Manuela Giugliano	Roma	
Best Young Player	(Nigeria) Jennifer Echegini	Juventus	
Best Goalkeeper	(France) Solène Durand	Sassuolo	
Best Defender	(Italy) Elena Linari	Roma	
Best Midfielder	(Spain) Verónica Boquete	Fiorentina	
Best Forward	(Canada) Evelyne Viens	Roma	

Team of the Season
Goalkeeper	(France) Solène Durand (Sassuolo)			
Defenders	(Italy) Martina Lenzini (Juventus)	(Japan) Moeka Minami (Roma)	(Italy) Elena Linari (Roma)	(Italy) Lucia Di Guglielmo (Roma)
Midfielders	(Italy) Manuela Giugliano (Roma)	(Japan) Saki Kumagai (Roma)		(Spain) Verónica Boquete (Fiorentina)
Midfielders	(Nigeria) Jennifer Echegini (Juventus)			
Forwards	(Canada) Evelyne Viens (Roma)		(Italy) Valentina Giacinti (Roma)	
