= Sofia Cantore =

Italian footballer (born 1999)

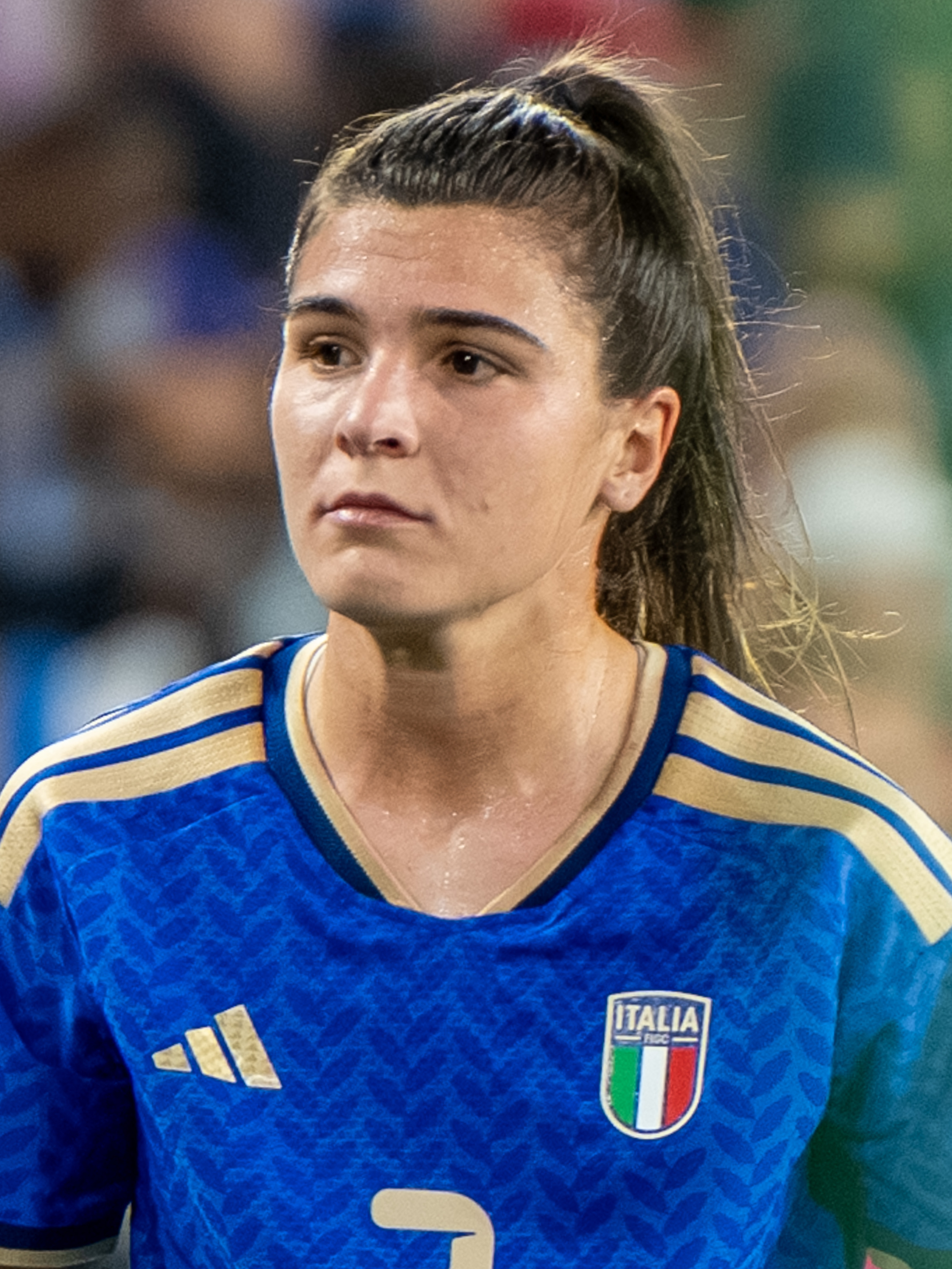
- Cantore with the Italy in 2025

Personal information
- Date of birth: 30 September 1999 (age 27)
- Place of birth: Lecco, Italy
- Height: 1.67 m (5 ft 6 in)
- Position: Forward

Team information
- Current team: Washington Spirit
- Number: 27

Senior career*
Years	Team	Apps	(Gls)
2015–2017	Fiammamonza		
2017–2025	Juventus	90	(26)
2019–2020	→ Hellas Verona (loan)	14	(3)
2020–2021	→ Florentia (loan)	22	(9)
2021–2022	→ Sassuolo (loan)	14	(8)
2025–	Washington Spirit	42	(10)

International career^{‡}
2015–2017	Italy U17	8	(6)
2017–2018	Italy U19	11	(4)
2020–	Italy	49	(6)
- * Club domestic league appearances and goals as of 05:24, 15 November 2026 (UTC) ‡ National team caps and goals as of 9 June 2026

Sofia Cantore (born 30 September 1999) is an Italian professional footballer who plays as a forward for the Washington Spirit of the National Women's Soccer League (NWSL) and the Italy national team.

== Club career ==
Cantore helped Fiammamonza gain promotion to Serie B in the 2016–17 season.

=== Juventus ===
In August 2017, she moved to Juventus. On 12 March 2018, Cantore scored her first goal for Juventus in a 2–0 away win against Verona. She scored four goals in 19 matches in the 2017–18 season, also winning the 2017–18 league title. On 9 June 2018, she suffered a knee injury which prevented her to play in the 2018 UEFA Women's Under-19 Championship. The injury also affected the following season in which she only played one match.

==== Loans ====
In July 2019, she moved to Hellas Verona on loan, where she scored three goals in 14 appearances. In July 2020, she moved on loan to Florentia, scoring nine goals in 22 appearances. On 9 July 2021, she was loaned to Sassuolo. She fractured her fibula on 18 February 2022, ending her season prematurely.

=== Washington Spirit ===
On 17 June 2025, Cantore transferred to the Washington Spirit and signed a three-year contract with the club. On 9 August, she debuted for the Spirit in a 0–0 draw with Gotham FC, becoming the first Italian to play in the National Women's Soccer League (NWSL). The following week, she scored her first NWSL goal with a strike from 35 yards (32 m) out off the crossbar and into the goal, the opener as the Spirit drew 2–2 with Racing Louisville. On 28 September, she backheeled a goal on the spin against the Houston Dash that won NWSL Goal of the Week. On 18 October, she had another backheel goal at the near post against the Orlando Pride that won NWSL Goal of the Week. In the playoffs, she started all three matches as the Spirit reached the NWSL Championship, losing to Gotham FC.

On 20 March 2026, Cantore scored her first goal of the season from distance against Racing Louisville, being awarded NWSL Goal of the Week. On 2 May, she scored twice within the first six minutes against the Orlando Pride, the fastest brace from kickoff in NWSL history. Later that month, she scored in the CONCACAF W Champions Cup final, a thrilling 5–3 defeat to Mexican club América.

== International career ==
On 1 December 2020, Cantore made her senior debut with Italy in a 0–0 draw against Denmark.

On 19 February 2023, she scored her first international goal against England with an equalizer, despite losing 1–2 in 2023 Arnold Clark Cup.

On 25 June 2025, Cantore was called up to the Italy squad for the UEFA Women's Euro 2025.

== Career statistics ==
=== International ===
Scores and results list Italy's goal tally first, score column indicates score after each Cantore goal.

List of international goals scored by Sofia Cantore
No.	Date	Venue	Opponent	Score	Result	Competition
1	19 February 2023	Coventry Building Society Arena, Coventry, England	England	1–1	2–1	2023 Arnold Clark Cup
2	25 October 2024	Stadio Tre Fontane, Rome, Italy	Malta	2–0	5–0	Friendly
3	25 October 2024	Stadio Tre Fontane, Rome, Italy	Malta	5–0	5–0	Friendly
4	2 December 2024	Ruhrstadion, Bochum, Germany	Germany	2–1	2–1	Friendly
5	3 June 2025	Swansea Stadium, Swansea, Wales	Wales	3–0	4–1	2025 UEFA Women's Nations League
6	14 April 2026	Dubočica Stadium, Leskovac, Serbia	Serbia	5–0	6–0	2027 FIFA Women's World Cup qualification

== Honours ==
Fiammamonza

- Serie C: 2016–17

Juventus

- Serie A: 2017–18, 2018–19, 2024–25
- Coppa Italia: 2018–19, 2022–23, 2024–25
- Supercoppa Italiana: 2023

Individual

- Serie A Best Forward: 2024–25
- Serie A Team of the Season: 2024–25
- AIC Serie A Women's Team of the Year: 2021–22, 2024–25
- AIC Serie A Female Footballer of the Year: 2024–25
