= Lucia Di Guglielmo =

Italian footballer (born 1997)

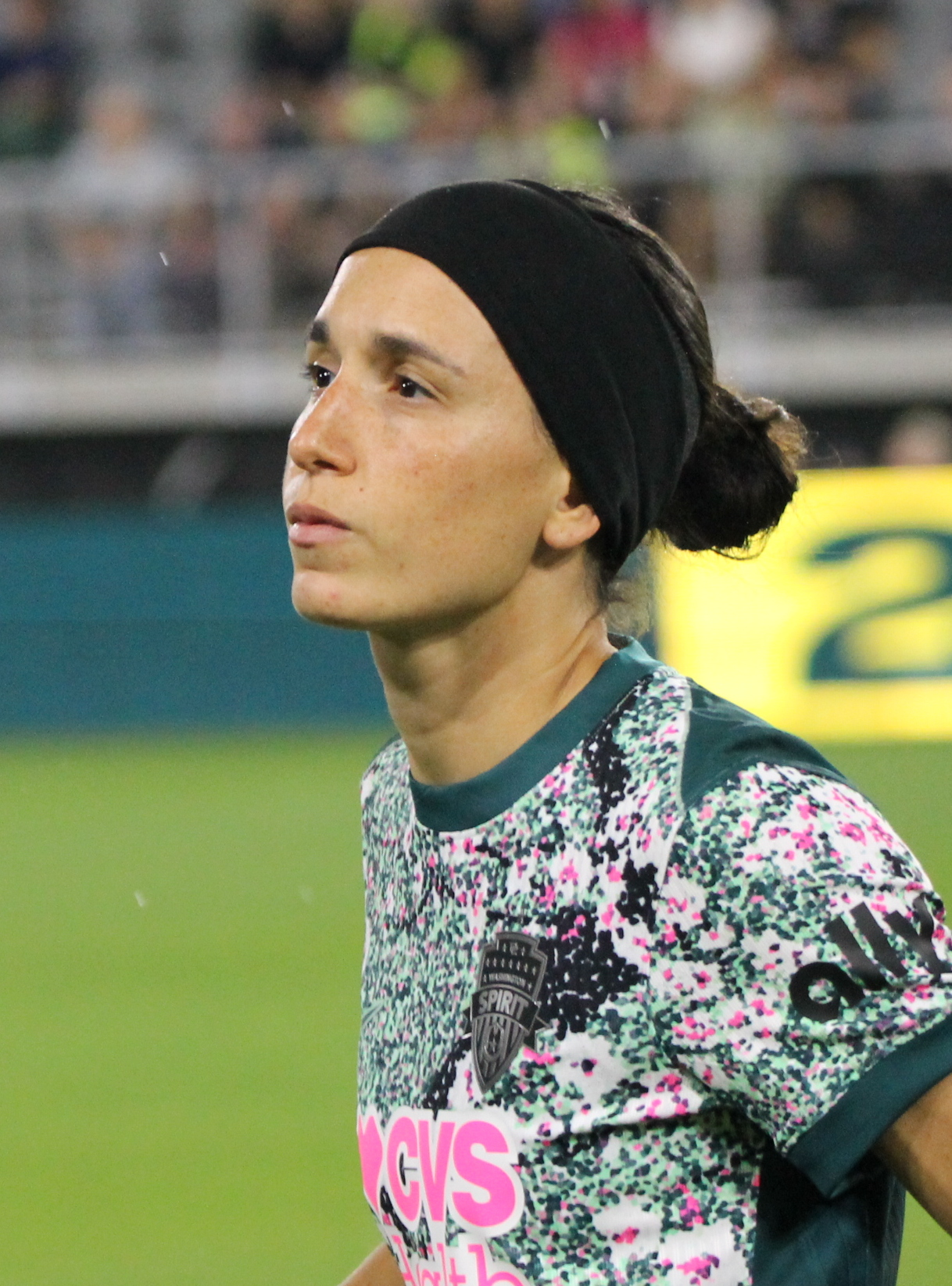
- Di Guglielmo with the Washington Spirit in 2026

Personal information
- Date of birth: 26 June 1997 (age 29)
- Height: 1.60 m (5 ft 3 in)
- Position: Full-back

Team information
- Current team: Washington Spirit
- Number: 13

Youth career
- 2005–2011: Zambra
- 2011–2012: Valdarno

Senior career*
Years	Team	Apps	(Gls)
2011–2012	Valdarno		
2012–2016	Castelfranco		
2016–2021	Empoli	52	(1)
2021–2025	Roma	78	(11)
2026–	Washington Spirit	19	(1)

International career^{‡}
2021–	Italy	33	(1)
- * Club domestic league appearances and goals as of 05:24, 15 November 2026 (UTC) ‡ National team caps and goals as of 20 March 2025

Lucia Di Guglielmo (Italian: [luˈtʃi.a di ɡuʎˈʎɛl.mo]; born 26 June 1997) is an Italian professional footballer who plays as a full-back for the Washington Spirit of the National Women's Soccer League (NWSL) and the Italy national team. She has previously played for Serie A clubs Empoli and Roma.

== Club career ==
Di Guglielmo started playing at local club Zambra after her best friend spurred her to join training. One of her team-mates at Zambra was Andrea Favilli. At the club she played for mixed youth teams until the age of 14 and in 2011 joined Valdarno, which later had its named changed to Castelfranco and eventually became the women's section of Empoli. With Castelfranco she competed in the Serie C and Serie B, while with Empoli she played in the Serie A. During her time at Empoli, she captained the club and made over 50 Serie A appearances.

In July 2021, Di Guglielmo signed with Roma, alongside former Empoli player Benedetta Glionna.

On 31 December 2025, National Women's Soccer League club Washington Spirit announced that they had acquired Di Guglielmo from Roma for an undisclosed transfer fee and signed her to a three-year contract through 2028 with a team option for an additional season.

== International career ==
In December 2017, Di Guglielmo was called up for the Italian under-23 team by Attilio Sorbi for a training camp in Granozzo con Monticello. She says the call-up made her understand that football was the right path for her. She was called-up again in November 2019 for a friendly against Netherlands.

Di Guglielmo made her debut for the Italy national team on 24 February 2021, coming on as a substitute in place of Valentina Bergamaschi against Israel at the Stadio Artemio Franchi in Florence.

On 26 June 2022, Di Guglielmo was announced in the Italy squad for the UEFA Women's Euro 2022.

On 2 July 2023, Di Guglielmo was called up to the 23-player Italy squad for the 2023 FIFA Women's World Cup.

In April 2024, Di Guglielmo scored her first goal for Italy, breaking the deadlock against Finland in the Legue A of UEFA Women's Euro 2025 qualifying in a match that ended a 1–2 loss.

On 25 June 2025, Di Guglielmo was called up to the Italy squad for the UEFA Women's Euro 2025.

== Style of play ==
Di Guglielmo plays as a right-back, but is also comfortable playing on the left. She can both attack and defend and has a physical side too.

== Personal life ==
Di Guglielmo was born in the Italian city of Pisa. She graduated from the University of Pisa with a Bachelor of Science degree in chemistry. In January 2024, she received a Master of Science degree in industrial chemistry.

== Career statistics ==
=== International ===
Scores and results list Italy's goal tally first, score column indicates score after each Di Guglielmo goal.

List of international goals scored by Lucia Di Guglielmo
No.	Date	Venue	Opponent	Score	Result	Competition
1	9 April 2024	Bolt Arena, Helsinki, Finland	Finland	1–0	1–2	UEFA Women's Euro 2025 qualifying

== Honours ==
Roma

- Serie A: 2022–23, 2023–24
