= Gina Chmielinski =

German footballer (born 2000)

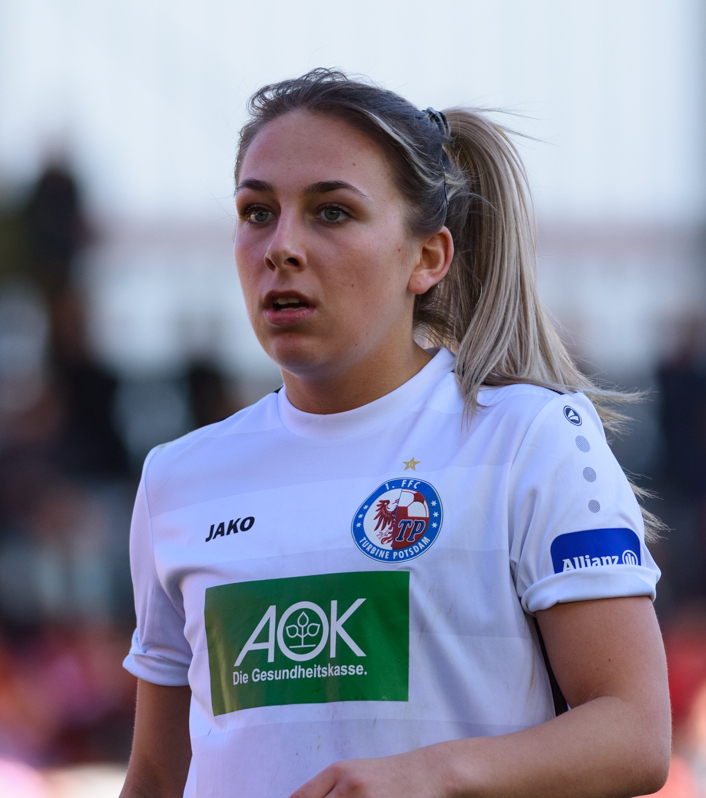
- Chmielinski with Turbine Potsdam in 2019

Personal information
- Full name: Gina-Maria Chmielinski
- Date of birth: 7 June 2000 (age 26)
- Place of birth: Ludwigsfelde, Germany
- Height: 1.60 m (5 ft 3 in)
- Position: Midfielder

Team information
- Current team: Parma
- Number: 10

Senior career*
| Years | Team | Apps | (Gls) |
| 2016–2018 | Turbine Potsdam II | 11 | (1) |
| 2016–2022 | Turbine Potsdam | 91 | (11) |
| 2022–2023 | FC Rosengård | 14 | (1) |
| 2023–2024 | Napoli | 27 | (1) |
| 2024–2025 | Sassuolo | 25 | (10) |
| 2025–2026 | RB Leipzig | 25 | (3) |
| 2026– | Parma | 0 | (0) |

International career
| 2015 | Germany U15 | 1 | (0) |
| 2015 | Germany U16 | 9 | (5) |
| 2016 | Germany U17 | 5 | (2) |
| 2017–2019 | Germany U19 | 20 | (7) |
Medal record
Women's football
Representing Germany
UEFA Women's Under-19 Championship
| Runner-up | 2019 Scotland |
- * Club domestic league appearances and goals as of 14:51, 9 October 2026 (UTC)

Gina-Maria Chmielinski is a German professional footballer who plays as a midfielder for Serie A club Parma. She has previously played for Italian clubs Sassuolo and Napoli, as well as Turbine Potsdam, FC Rosengård and RB Leipzig.

== Club career ==
=== Turbine Potsdam ===
Chmielinski was introduced to football from a very young age, starting her career at the age of three with Ludwigsfelder. In 2012, she moved to the youth team of Turbine Potsdam while attending the "Friedrich Ludwig Jahn" sports school in Potsdam . From 2014 to 2016, Chmielinski played in the Bundesliga with the B Juniors. In the 2014–15 season, the team won the championship title by beating Werder Bremen 3–1 in the final, followed a year later by the title defence after a 4–2 win in her hometown of Ludwigsfelde against Gütersloh.

In the summer of 2016, she was added to the first team squad and under the technical guidance of Matthias Rudolph, she made her Frauen-Bundesliga debut on 18 December 2016, on the 11th matchday of the championship, starting with a resounding 8–0 home win over MSV Duisburg, finally replaced by Tabea Kemme in the 73rd minute. She had to wait until the following season, on 12 November 2017, to score her first goal in the Frauen Bundesliga, when in the 80th minute against Bayern Munich she scored the final equaliser in a 2–2 draw.

In total, Chmielinski remained tied to the Potsdam club for six consecutive seasons, contributing to many high-finishes in the Frauen Bundesliga, finishing third twice and in fourth spot four times in the Bundesliga, and reaching the final in the German Women's Cup, losing the 2022 Final 4–0 against Wolfsburg.

=== FC Rosengård ===
In the summer of 2022, she decided to move abroad for the first time, reaching an agreement with the Swedish team FC Rosengård to play the second part of the 2022 season joining her compatriot Rebecca Knaak. She made her debut in Damallsvenskan a month later, when coach Renée Slegers selected her on the 16th matchday of the championship, replacing Sofie Bredgaard in the 79th minute in the 2–0 home win against Häcken. With seven appearances in the Damallsvenskan, she contributed to the club winning their 13th Swedish championship title. She started the following season with the Malmö club, making seven appearances and scoring her first goal overseas in a 4–0 league win over Vittsjö GIK.

=== Move to Italy: Napoli and Sassuolo ===
On 13 August 2023, Chmielinski moved permanently to Napoli, who had just returned to Serie A. During the season, she made 25 appearances, scoring one goal and seven assists in the league, contributing to the Campania club's survival.

On 15 July 2024, she was signed on a permanent basis by US Sassuolo, staying in the top division in Italy. Chmielinski made her debut in Sassuolo's opening day 6–3 home defeat to Juventus on 1 September 2024, going goalless in her first four games. She scored her first goal for the club in a 3–2 loss away to Lazio, starting a run of six goals in six games. She netted the opening goal a week later in a 3–1 home defeat against Fiorentina, before scoring doubles against Como and on 17 November 2024 in a comeback 2–2 draw against Juventus, with both of her goals coming from outside the penalty area. At the end of the season, she was voted the best midfielder in Serie A.

=== RB Leipzig ===
In June 2025, Chmielinski moved back to Germany and signed for Frauen-Bundesliga club RB Leipzig.

=== Parma Calcio ===
On 17 July 2026, Just one year after returning to the Bundesliga, Chmielinsk moved back to Italy to join Parma for the 2026–27 season. Her contract with the Italian first division club runs until 2028.

In August 2026, Chmielinski sustained a right knee sprain during a pre-season friendly match. Subsequent diagnostic tests confirmed a rupture of her Anterior cruciate ligament (ACL).

== International career ==
Chmielinski played 35 youth international matches for Germany, scoring 14 goals. As of October 2026, she is still awaiting a call-up to the senior German national team.

She played the full 90 minutes of the 2019 UEFA Women's Under-19 Championship final, where Germany lost 2–1 to France at St Mirren Park.

== Honours ==
FC Rosengård

- Damallsvenskan: 2022

Turbine Potsdam

- B Juniors: 2014–15, 2015–16

Germany

- UEFA Women's Under-19 Championship runner-up: 2019

Individual

- Serie A Best Midfielder: 2024–25
- Serie A Team of the Season: 2024–25
