= Natalie Muth =

American soccer player (born 1998)

Personal information
- Full name: Natalie Rose Muth
- Date of birth: July 27, 1998 (age 28)
- Place of birth: Portland, Oregon, U.S.
- Position: Midfielder

Team information
- Current team: Napoli
- Number: 13

College career
Years	Team	Apps	(Gls)
2016–2019	Portland Pilots	69	(4)

Senior career*
Years	Team	Apps	(Gls)
2021	BIIK Kazygurt		
2022	Eibar	11	(0)
2022–2023	Levante Las Planas	27	(0)
2023–2024	MSV Duisburg	19	(3)
2024–	Napoli	10	(0)
- * Club domestic league appearances and goals

Natalie Rose Muth (born July 27, 1998) is an American soccer player who plays for Napoli.
