= 2024 Supercoppa Italiana (women) =

Supercoppa Italiana Femminile
Italian Women's Supercup
- Event: Supercoppa Italiana
| Roma | Fiorentina |
| 3 | 1 |
- Date: 6 January 2025
- Venue: Stadio Alberto Picco, La Spezia
- Player of the Match: Emilie Haavi
- Referee: Silvia Gasperotti

The 2024 Supercoppa Italiana, also known as Supercoppa Frecciarossa for sponsorship reasons, was the 28th iteration of Italian women's super cup, contested by the previous season champion of Serie A and winner of the Coppa Italia.

AS Roma managed to win both the 2023–24 Serie A and 2023–24 Coppa Italia.

The second finalist of the Coppa Italia qualifies for Supercoppa in the event of single team winning both competitions. The 2024 edition of the Supercoppa will thus was a rematch of the 2023–24 Coppa Italia finals between AS Roma and ACF Fiorentina. Roma won the match 3–1.

== Teams ==
| Team | Method of qualification | Previous appearances^{1} |
|---|---|---|
| AS Roma | 2023–24 Serie A champion & 2023–24 Coppa Italia winner | 4 (2020–21, 2021–22, **2022**, 2023) |
| ACF Fiorentina | 2023–24 Coppa Italia runner-up | 4 (2017, **2018**, 2019, 2020–21) |

^{1} Bold indicates winners for that year.

== Match ==
6 January 2025
15:30 CET (UTC+1)

| Roma | 3–1 | Fiorentina |
|---|---|---|
| Glionna 17'; Giacinti 64'; Corelli 89' | Report | Janogy 60' |

Stadio Alberto Picco, La Spezia
Referee: Silvia Gasperotti
