= All-SEC =

All-SEC may refer to:

- List of All-SEC football teams
- List of All-SEC men's basketball teams
