= Camelia Ceasar =

Romanian footballer (born 1997)

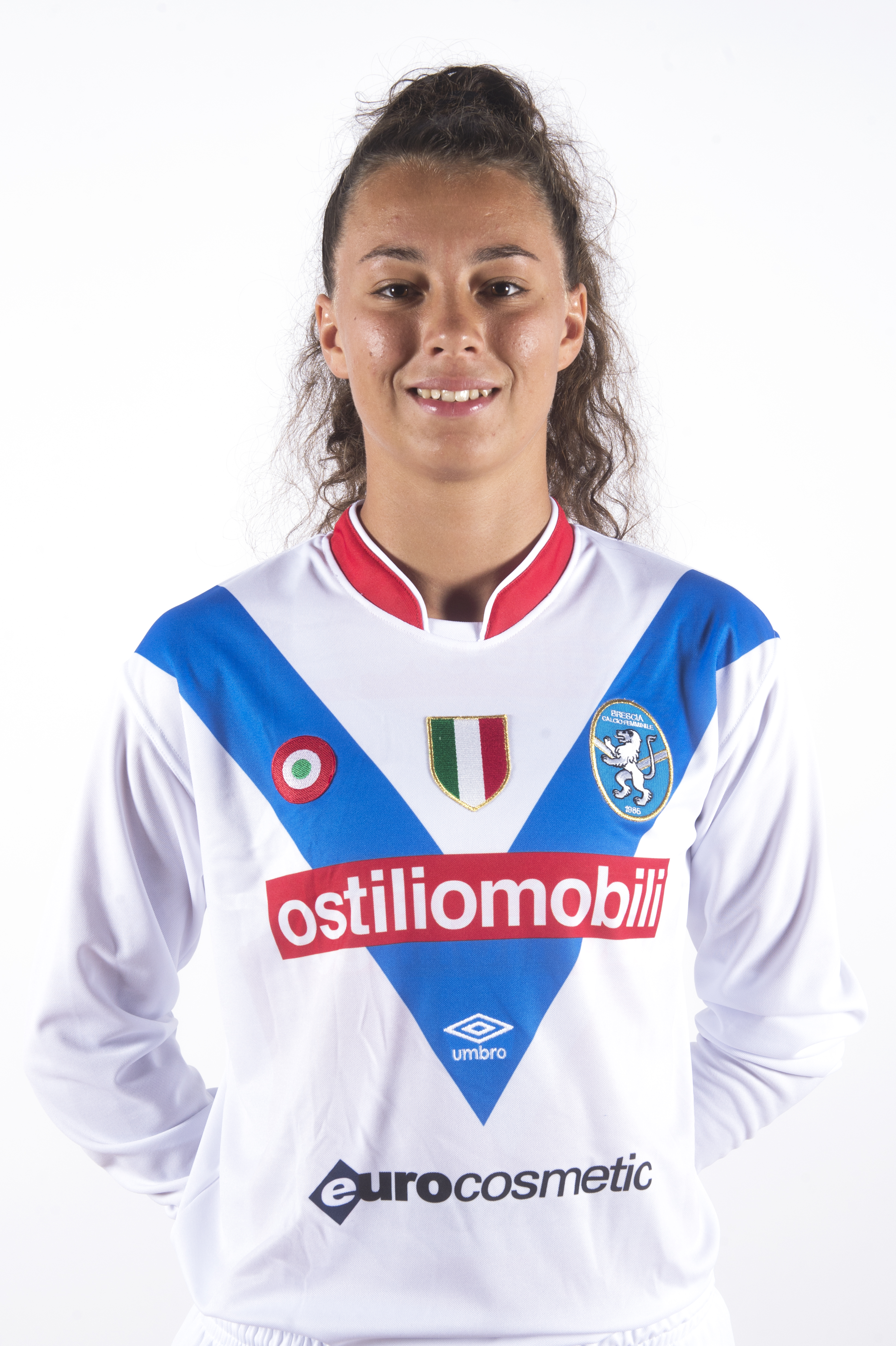
- Ceasar as a Brescia Calcio player in 2016

Personal information
- Date of birth: 13 December 1997 (age 28)
- Place of birth: Bacău, Romania
- Height: 1.73 m (5 ft 8 in)
- Position: Goalkeeper

Team information
- Current team: Parma
- Number: 12

Senior career*
Years	Team	Apps	(Gls)
2012–2013	Torino	19	(0)
2013–2018	Brescia	64	(0)
2018–2019	Milan	4	(0)
2019–2025	Roma	101	(0)
2025–	Parma	7	(0)

International career^{‡}
2015	Romania U19	6	(0)
2019–	Romania	9	(0)
- * Club domestic league appearances and goals as of 17:28, 29 November 2025 (UTC) ‡ National team caps and goals as of 13:42, 23 March 2023 (UTC)

Camelia Ceasar (born 13 December 1997) is a Romanian professional footballer who plays as a goalkeeper for Italian Serie A club Parma and the Romania national team.

== Early life ==
Ceasar was born in Bacău, Romania, on 13 December 1997. Her family chose to move to Italy when Ceasar was five years old, and she took up an interest in football soon after settling in Italy.

== Club career ==
=== Early career ===
Ceasar began her youth career with Torino in 2008, but was already informally training with the club in the months prior where Ceasar would wear the number 9 shirt and play up front. By coincidence, Caesar was selected to play as a goalkeeper in training and was subsequently offered a youth contract with the club.

Ceasar made the jump to Torino's senior team in the 2012–13 season at thirteen years of age, soon becoming the full-time starting goalkeeper for the Granata. Despite her performances in goal, Torino struggled in Serie A and ultimately finished bottom of the table to find themselves relegated to the Italian second division. Ceasar was offered a chance to stay in top-flight Italian football when she sealed a move to Milena Bertolini's Brescia side for the 2013–2014 season.

=== Brescia ===
Ceasar used her time as an understudy at Brescia to grow her game within the environment of Brescia's "golden generation" of young Italian footballing talent. She finished her first season with the club as a Scudetto winner, with Caesar's 14 appearances in goal helping Brescia win the Serie A league title. Ceasar continued to push Italian international goalkeeper Chiara Marchitelli for the role of starting goalkeeper, during Ceasar's five-year stay at the club.

In her final season with Brescia, Ceasar earned plaudits for saving a penalty in a derby game against Mozzanica, which helped Ceasar finish the calendar year of 2017 as a firm favourite of the club and 2017-18 Brescia coach Gianpiero Piovani's first choice in goal. Ceasar cited the family atmosphere, technical quality and interpersonal qualities around the club as the reason for Brescia's continued success.

=== Milan ===
Despite her increasing success in Serie A, Ceasar witnessed Brescia sell off their right to participate in Italy's top flight to newly franchised club AC Milan in the summer of 2018. Ceasar was one of the many Brescia names who saw their playing rights transferred to AC Milan for the 2018-19 Serie A season, where Ceasar now found herself demoted to second-choice goalkeeper under the guidance of Milan coach Carolina Morace. Facing a lack of playing time in the north of Italy, Ceasar chose to sign for Roma in the summer of 2019 along with fellow ex-Milan teammate Manuela Giugliano.

=== Roma ===
In Rome, Ceasar was faced with the familiar challenge of deposing an Italy international goalkeeper from the team's first eleven. Ceasar shared game time with Roma's favoured goalkeeper and vice-captain Rosalia Pipitone, meaning Ceasar racked up a total 13 league appearances for Roma in the 2019–20 season. Nonetheless, Ceasar used her game time to pull out yet more notable penalty saves including one against Fiorentina in January 2020 that helped Roma win a point against their Serie A rivals. Ceasar also finished that season openly declaring that she had "rediscovered" her supportive environment at Roma, suggesting she was happy to keep playing for the club. Both Roma and Ceasar confirmed the sentiment the following year with Ceasar signing a contract extension in April 2021.

In her second season with Roma, Ceasar was challenged for the goalkeeper's spot by Italian international keeper Rachele Baldi and Ceasar was once again limited to 13 league appearances in the 2020–21 season but delivered a better clean-sheet percentage than Baldi over the course of the league campaign. Above all, Ceasar sealed her reputation as an expert at saving penalties when she helped Roma win the 2021 Coppa Italia final against Ceasar's former club AC Milan in a penalty shootout.

Ceasar would save two penalties in the shootout, and took the competition sponsor TIMVision's MVP award for the Coppa Italia final. Ceasar followed that up by winning the Italian Football Players' Association Female Player of the Month award in May 2021.

=== Parma ===
In July 2025, Ceasar was announced to have joined fellow Serie A club Parma.

== International career ==
In April 2012, Italy U-17 coach Corrado Corradini tried to seal Camelia Ceasar's involvement with adopted country Italy at international level. However, Italy's bureaucracy prevented Ceasar from representing the Azzurre at any level. In 2015, Ceasar represented her native Romania at youth level for the first time. She went on to make her senior debut with Romania in 2019.

== Career statistics ==
=== Club ===
As of match played 21 March 2023

Appearances and goals by club, season and competition
Club	Season	League			Coppa Italia		Continental		Other (Note: Includes Supercoppa Italiana)		Total	
Club	Season	Division	Apps	Goals	Apps	Goals	Apps	Goals	Apps	Goals	Apps	Goals
Torino	2012–13	Serie A	19	0	0	0	–		–		19	0
Brescia	2013–14	Serie A	14	0	0	0	–		–		14	0
Brescia	2014–15	Serie A	4	0	1	0	0	0	0	0	5	0
Brescia	2015–16	Serie A	18	0	2	0	5	0	0	0	25	0
Brescia	2016–17	Serie A	11	0	1	0	0	0	0	0	12	0
Brescia	2017–18	Serie A	17	0	3	0	2	0	0	0	22	0
Brescia	Total		64	0	7	0	7	0	0	0	78	0
A.C. Milan	2018–19	Serie A	4	0	2	0	–		–		6	0
A.S. Roma	2019–20	Serie A	13	0	1	0	–		–		14	0
A.S. Roma	2020–21	Serie A	13	0	5	0	–		1	0	17	0
A.S. Roma	2021–22	Serie A	19	0	2	0	–		1	0	21	0
A.S. Roma	2022–23	Serie A	13	0	1	0	10	0	1	0	25	0
A.S. Roma	Total		58	0	9	0	10	0	3	0	80	0
Career total			145	0	18	0	17	0	3	0	183	0

=== International ===
As of match played 22 February 2023

Appearances and goals by national team and year
National team	Year	Apps	Goals
Romania	2019	1	0
Romania	2022	5	0
Romania	2023	3	0
Total		9	0

== Honours ==
S.S.D. Brescia Calcio

- Serie A: 2013–14, 2015–16
- Coppa Italia: 2014–15, 2015–16
- Supercoppa Italiana: 2014–15, 2015–16, 2016–17, 2017–18
- Coppa Italia runner-up: 2015–16, 2016–17

A.S. Roma

- Coppa Italia: 2020–21
- Supercoppa Italiana: 2022–23
- Coppa Italia runner-up: 2021–22
