= 2023–24 Coppa Italia (women) =

Football tournament season

2023–24 Italian Women's Cup
Tournament details
- Teams: 26

Final positions
- Champions: Roma
- Runners-up: Fiorentina

Tournament statistics
- Matches played: 31
- Goals scored: 111 (3.58 per match)

The 2023–24 Italian Women's Cup (Coppa Italia di calcio femminile) was the 52nd edition of the Italian women's football national cup. The 2024 Coppa Italia was won by Roma after beating Fiorentina in the final.
