= Stadio Enzo Ricci =

Stadium in Sassuolo, Italy

- Interactive map of Stadio Enzo Ricci
- Location: Sassuolo, Italy
- Coordinates: 44°32′25″N 10°47′19″E
- Owner: Municipality of Sassuolo
- Capacity: 4,008
- Surface: Grass

Tenants
- U.S. Sassuolo Calcio (1972–2008); U.S. Sassuolo Calcio Primavera; Sassuolo Femminille

Stadio Enzo Ricci is a multi-use stadium in Sassuolo, Italy. It holds 4,008 people. It was used as professional football club U.S. Sassuolo Calcio's home ground prior to their promotion to Serie B in 2008, when it agreed on a move to the larger Stadio Alberto Braglia in Modena. The club has continued to use the ground for training.

In 1983, the stadium was named after Enzo Ricci, a local doctor and club patron.
