= Benedetta Glionna =

Italian footballer (born 1999)

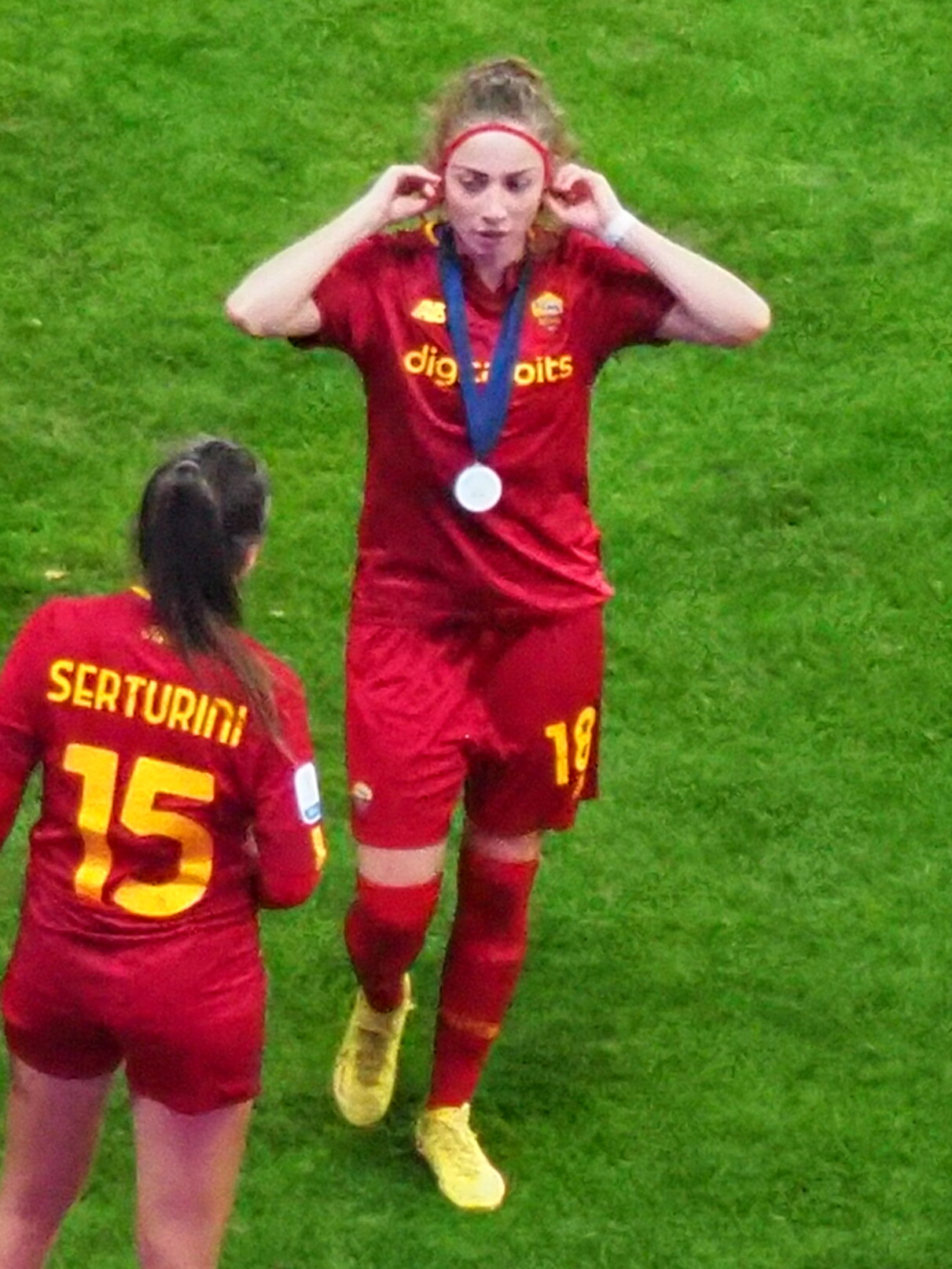

Personal information
- Date of birth: 26 July 1999 (age 27)
- Place of birth: Naples, Italy
- Position: Forward

Team information
- Current team: Inter Milan
- Number: 18

Youth career
- 2011–2017: Fiammamonza
- 2017–2018: Juventus

Senior career*
Years	Team	Apps	(Gls)
2013–2017	Fiammamonza	(-)	(70)
2017–2021	Juventus	38	(13)
2019–2020	→ Hellas Verona (loan)	16	(5)
2020–2021	→ Empoli (loan)	18	(10)
2021–2025	Roma	53	(12)
2025–	Inter Milan		

International career^{‡}
2015–2016	Italy U17	6	(1)
2016–2018	Italy U19	14	(4)
2019	Italy U23	1	(0)
2018–	Italy	28	(1)
- * Club domestic league appearances and goals as of 16 January 2025 (UTC) ‡ National team caps and goals as of 11 October 2026

Benedetta Glionna (born 26 July 1999) is an Italian professional footballer who plays as a forward for Serie A club Inter Milan and the Italy women's national team.

== Club career ==
Glionna began her youth career with Fiammamonza in 2011 and was promoted to the senior team by the beginning of the 2013–2014 season due to the club's financial crisis and forced relegation to Serie C, along with long-time teammate Sofia Cantore. Fiammamonza began to push for promotion with Glionna and Cantore as first-team regulars, but narrowly missed out on the jump to Serie B in Glionna's first two seasons of senior football with the club. Finally, in the 2016–17 season, Fiammamonza gained promotion to Serie B thanks to decisive goals from Glionna and Cantore in the 7 May 2017 3-2 league victory over Olimpia Paitone. By the summer of 2017, Glionna had scored at least 70 goals for Fiammamonza and the prolific duo of Glionna-Cantore did not go unnoticed by newly formed Serie A giants Juventus, who signed both young Italian forwards for the 2017–2018 season.

Despite the jump to top-level Serie A football following her move to Juventus, Glionna's prolific goalscoring did not slow down in Turin. Glionna finished her first season with Juventus scoring 11 goals in 24 games for the club in all competitions (including 9 league goals in 20 league games) at senior level, helping the club to win their first Serie A league title in 2018. Glionna was also still young enough to be eligible to play for Juventus Primavera in the 2017–2018 season, where she helped the Primavera team get to the playoff final (lost against eventual Primavera champions Pink Bari).

For her performances in her first season with Juventus, Glionna was awarded the European Golden Girl Trophy (Best Italian Young Player award) by Tuttosport in December 2018. Despite her success on the field (including a league and couple double with Juventus in 2019), Glionna's second season in Turin was beset by repeated injuries suffered while playing for both club and country, ultimately limiting Glionna's appearances and impact on the pitch. Due to her injury problems and the increased competition in the Juventus senior squad, Glionna was sent out on loan to Hellas Verona for the 2019–20 season along with Sofia Cantore.

Glionna returned to regular Serie A action during her season-long stay at Verona, but her 5 goals in 16 league games wasn't enough to force a return to the Juventus first eleven by the summer of 2020. As a result, Glionna was sent out on another season-long loan to Empoli for the 2020-21 Serie A season, where she would link up with former Juventus Primavera coach Alessandro Spugna who himself was appointed the new Empoli women's senior coach for the season. However, Glionna's long-term strike partner Sofia Cantore was sent out on loan to Florentia, marking the end of a seven-year partnership between Glionna and Cantore that lasted across three different clubs.

Under Spugna's tutelage at Empoli, Glionna's form flourished as she scored 10 league goals in 18 Serie A games and 15 goals in 21 appearances in all competitions for underdogs Empoli during 2020–21, ranking her statistically as one of the Top 10 attacking players in Italian football on the women's side of the game that season. Glionna's goalscoring grabbed the headlines on 31 January 2021, when the Italian forward scored a hat-trick (all from three direct free-kicks) against her parent-club Juventus in the first leg of a 5-4 Coppa Italia quarter-final loss for Empoli. Despite Empoli enjoying success in all competitions against the odds, coach Alessandro Spugna was fired before the end of the league campaign and it was heavily rumoured Empoli's decision was fueled by Spugna accepting a deal to take over as Roma head coach for the next season. Spugna was eventually announced as the Roma coach on 2 June 2021 and Benedetta Glionna followed him, sealing her permanent transfer to Roma the following month.

On 5 July 2021, she signed a contract with Roma until the summer of 2024.

== International career ==
She made her debut for the Italy national team on 20 January 2018 against France, starting the match.

== International goals ==
Scores and results list Italy's goal tally first.

No.	Date	Venue	Opponent	Score	Result	Competition
1.	25 October 2024	Stadio Tre Fontane, Rome, Italy	Malta	3–0	5–0	Friendly

== Personal life ==
Glionna was born in Naples, Italy.
