= Stadio Tre Fontane =

Rugby union venue in Rome, Italy

Coordinates: 41°50′28″N 12°28′12″E

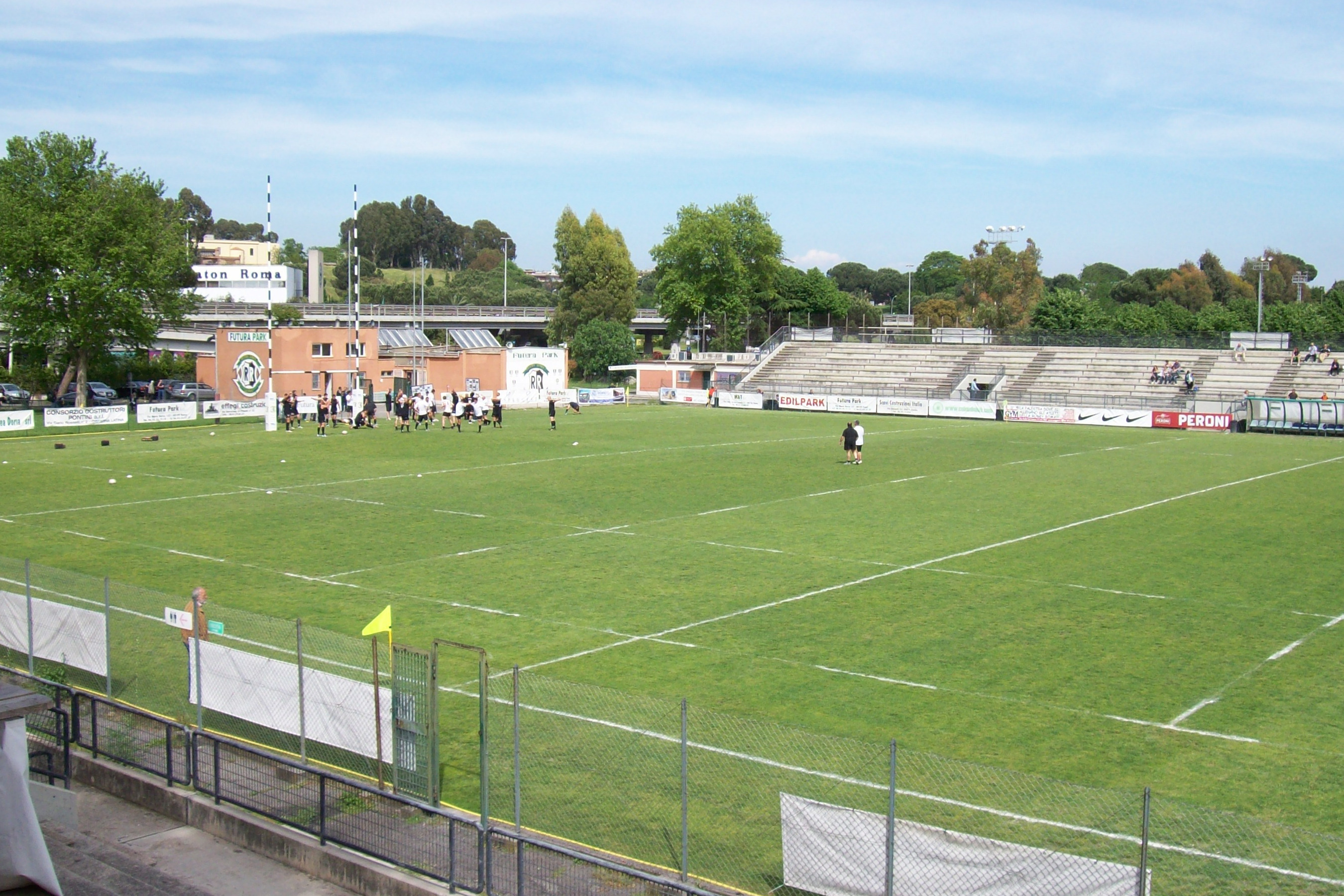
- Roma Stadio Tre Fontane
- Interactive map of Stadio Tre Fontane
- Location: Rome, Italy
- Capacity: 4,000

Tenants
- Rugby Roma Olimpic; A.S. Roma Women; A.S. Roma Primavera (selective matches)

Stadio Tre Fontane is a sports stadium located in Rome, Italy. It is the home ground of rugby union side Rugby Roma Olimpic, who play in the Super 10 competition. It currently has a capacity of 4,000, although there are plans to redevelop and expand the stadium.

The stadium is also used by A.S. Roma Women for Serie A games and A.S. Roma Primavera for the UEFA Youth League games.
