= 2025–26 AS Roma (women) season =

AS Roma
2025–26 season
- Manager: Luca Rossettini
- Stadium: Stadio Tre Fontane
- Serie A: 1st
- Coppa Italia: Winners
- Supercoppa: Runners-up
- Women's Cup: Runners-up
- Champions League: League phase
- Top goalscorer: League: Manuela Giugliano (12); All: Manuela Giugliano (19)
- Highest home attendance: 2,731 (vs Barcelona, UWCL, 15 October 2025) at Stadio Tre Fontane
- Lowest home attendance: 1,214 (vs St. Pölten, UWCL, 17 December 2025) at Stadio Tre Fontane
- Average home league attendance: 1,719
- Biggest win: 6–1 (vs St. Pölten, UWCL, 17 December 2025)
- Biggest defeat: 0–6 (vs Chelsea, UWCL, 10 December 2025)
Home colours	Away colours	Third colours

The 2025–26 season was AS Roma's 8th season in Italy's first league. The club participated in the Serie A Femminile, the Coppa Italia, the Supercoppa Italiana and the Champions League.

== Squad information & statistics ==
=== First team squad ===
No.	Name	Date of Birth (Age)	Since	Last Contract	Signed from
Goalkeepers
1	(Czech Republic) Olivie Lukášová	4 June 2001 (age 25)	2024	August 2025	(Czech Republic) Slavia Prague
24	(Italy) Rachele Baldi	2 October 1994 (age 32)	2025	August 2025	(Italy) Fiorentina
36	(Italy) Valentina Soggiu	1 January 2003 (age 23)	2023	September 2025	(Italy) Juventus
Defenders
2	(Denmark) Katrine Veje	19 June 1991 (age 35)	2025	July 2025	(England) Crystal Palace
3	(Italy) Lucia Di Guglielmo	26 June 1997 (age 29)	2021	February 2023	(Italy) Empoli
4	(Australia) Wini Heatley	18 June 2001 (age 25)	2025	July 2025	(Denmark) Nordsjælland
5	(Canada) Maya Antoine	8 August 2001 (age 25)	2026	January 2026	(Sweden) Norrköping
6	(Spain) Oihane Valdezate	10 April 2000 (age 26)	2023	July 2023	(Spain) Athletic Club
19	(Nigeria) Shukurat Oladipo	22 September 2004 (age 22)	2025	February 2025	(Nigeria) Robo
23	(Italy) Valentina Bergamaschi	22 January 1997 (age 29)	2025	July 2025	(Italy) Juventus
44	(Dominican Republic) Samantha van Diemen	28 January 2002 (age 24)	2025	July 2025	(Scotland) Glasgow City
78	(Poland) Magda Piekarska	9 September 2007 (age 19)	2025	July 2025	(Poland) Rekord Bielsko-Biała
Midfielders
8	(Hungary) Anna Csiki	14 November 1999 (age 27)	2026	February 2026	(England) Tottenham (loan)
10	(Italy) Manuela Giugliano (c)	18 August 1997 (age 29)	2019	December 2023	(Italy) Milan
15	(Italy) Giulia Dragoni	7 November 2006 (age 20)	2025	August 2025	(Spain) Barcelona (loan)
20	(Italy) Giada Greggi	18 February 2000 (age 26)	2018	October 2025	(Italy) Res Roma
22	(Italy) Marta Pandini	21 March 1998 (age 28)	2024	February 2024	(Italy) Inter
24	(Denmark) Kathrine Møller Kühl	5 July 2003 (age 23)	2025	January 2025	(England) Arsenal
25	(Denmark) Frederikke Thøgersen	24 July 1995 (age 31)	2024	July 2024	(Italy) Inter
29	(Germany) Annalena Rieke	10 January 1999 (age 27)	2025	July 2025	(Germany) Essen
53	(Italy) Martina Cherubini	23 May 2006 (age 20)	N/A	N/A	Homegrown
Forwards
7	(Canada) Evelyne Viens	6 February 1997 (age 29)	2023	August 2023	(Sweden) Kristianstad
9	(Norway) Frøya Dorsin	7 January 2007 (age 19)	2026	January 2026	(France) PSG
11	(Norway) Emilie Haavi	16 June 1992 (age 34)	2021	March 2023	(Norway) LSK Kvinner
16	(Italy) Alice Corelli	28 November 2003 (age 22)	2020	July 2023	Homegrown
17	(Switzerland) Alayah Pilgrim	29 April 2003 (age 23)	2024	January 2024	(Switzerland) Zürich
21	(Canada) Mia Pante	25 March 2003 (age 23)	2025	January 2025	(United States) Texas A&M University
30	(Nigeria) Rinsola Babajide	17 June 1998 (age 28)	2025	July 2025	(Spain) Tenerife
35	(Italy) Rosanna Ventriglia	13 December 2007 (age 18)	N/A	N/A	Homegrown
47	(Italy) Giulia Galli	23 March 2008 (age 18)	N/A	N/A	Homegrown

=== Statistics ===
Statistics as of 24 May 2026

==== Appearances and goals ====
No.	Name	Serie A Femminile		Serie A Women's Cup		Coppa Italia		Supercoppa		UWCL		Total	
No.	Name	Apps	Goals	Apps	Goals	Apps	Goals	Apps	Goals	Apps	Goals	Apps	Goals
Goalkeepers
1	(Czech Republic) Olivie Lukášová	3	0	4	0	3	0	0	0	6	0	16	0
24	(Italy) Rachele Baldi	19	0	2	0	1	0	1	0	4	0	27	0
36	(Italy) Valentina Soggiu	0+1	0	0	0	1	0	0	0	0	0	1+1	0
Defenders
2	(Denmark) Katrine Veje	12+2	0	5	0	1+1	0	1	0	7	0	26+3	0
4	(Australia) Wini Heatley	11+2	0	4	0	3+2	0	0	0	6	0	24+4	0
5	(Canada) Maya Antoine	6	0	1	0	2	0	0	0	0	0	9	0
6	(Spain) Oihane Valdezate	11	0	0+1	0	0	0	1	0	4+1	0	16+2	0
19	(Nigeria) Shukurat Oladipo	15+3	0	1	0	5	0	1	0	6	0	28+3	0
25	(Denmark) Frederikke Thøgersen	12+7	1	2+1	0	3+1	0	0	0	4+4	0	21+13	1
44	(Dominican Republic) Samantha van Diemen	2+1	0	5	0	0	0	0	0	4	0	11+1	0
78	(Poland) Magda Piekarska	0+1	0	0	0	1+1	0	0	0	0	0	1+2	0
	(Italy) Lucia Di Guglielmo	4+2	1	4+1	0	0	0	0	0	4+1	2	12+4	3
Midfielders
8	(Hungary) Anna Csiki	7+1	0	1	0	2	0	0	0	0	0	10+1	0
10	(Italy) Manuela Giugliano	19+1	12	4	1	3+1	3	1	1	8+1	2	35+3	19
15	(Italy) Giulia Dragoni	15+7	7	0	0	4+1	0	1	0	3+3	1	23+11	8
20	(Italy) Giada Greggi	18+3	0	4+2	1	4+1	0	1	0	7+3	0	34+9	1
22	(Italy) Marta Pandini	7+8	1	1+2	0	2+1	1	0	0	4+4	2	14+15	4
23	(Italy) Valentina Bergamaschi	15+6	2	4+2	0	4	0	1	0	5+4	1	29+12	3
29	(Germany) Annalena Rieke	9+5	0	5	1	3+1	0	1	0	7	0	25+6	1
53	(Italy) Martina Cherubini	0	0	0	0	0	0	0	0	0	0	0	0
57	(Italy) Sofia Testa	0+1	0	0	0	0	0	0	0	0	0	0+1	0
	(Denmark) Kathrine Møller Kühl	4	0	3+2	0	1	0	0	0	4+4	0	12+6	0
Forwards
7	(Canada) Evelyne Viens	19+2	3	1+2	2	5	5	1	0	5+1	5	31+5	15
9	(Norway) Frøya Dorsin	5+6	2	0+1	0	0+3	0	0+1	0	0	0	5+11	2
11	(Norway) Emilie Haavi	7+3	2	3+2	1	2	0	0	0	6+1	2	18+6	5
16	(Italy) Alice Corelli	10+10	5	4+1	2	3+1	1	0	0	2+7	1	19+19	9
17	(Switzerland) Alayah Pilgrim	5+5	2	4+1	3	0+2	0	0+1	0	8+1	1	17+10	6
30	(Nigeria) Rinsola Babajide	5+6	2	2+4	2	0+2	0	1	0	5+2	0	13+14	4
35	(Italy) Rosanna Ventriglia	0+2	0+1	0	0	0+1	0	0	0	1+1	1	0+5	0
47	(Italy) Giulia Galli	2+9	1	0+4	1	1	0	0	0	1+5	1	4+18	3
	(Canada) Mia Pante	0+7	1	1+1	0	1	0	0	0	1+4	0	3+12	1

==== Goalscorers ====
Rank	No.	Position	Name	Serie A Femminile	Serie A Women's Cup	Coppa Italia	Supercoppa	UWCL	Total	
1	10	MF	(Italy) Manuela Giugliano	12	1	3	1	2	19	
2	7	MF	(Canada) Evelyne Viens	3	2	5	0	5	15	
3	16	FW	(Italy) Alice Corelli	5	2	1	0	1	9	
4	15	MF	(Italy) Giulia Dragoni	7	0	0	0	1	8	
5	11	FW	(Norway) Emilie Haavi	2	2	0	0	2	6	
5	17	FW	(Switzerland) Alayah Pilgrim	2	3	0	0	1	6	
6	22	MF	(Italy) Marta Pandini	1	0	1	0	2	4	
6	30	FW	(Nigeria) Rinsola Babajide	2	2	0	0	0	4	
6	47	FW	(Italy) Giulia Galli	2	1	0	0	1	4	
7	3	DF	(Italy) Lucia Di Guglielmo	1	0	0	0	2	3	
7	23	MF	(Italy) Valentina Bergamaschi	2	0	0	0	1	3	
8	9	FW	(Norway) Frøya Dorsin	2	0	0	0	0	2	
9	20	MF	(Italy) Giada Greggi	0	1	0	0	0	1	
9	25	DF	(Denmark) Frederikke Thøgersen	1	0	0	0	0	1	
9	29	MF	(Germany) Annalena Rieke	0	1	0	0	0	1	
9	Total				29	14	10	1	17	72

=== Suspensions ===
No.	Position	Player	Games suspended	Reason
4	DF	(Australia) Wini Heatley	v. Lazio, 16 November 2025	Red Card (two yellows) vs. Fiorentina

== Transfers, loans and other signings ==
=== Transfers in ===
Announcement date	No.	Position	Player	From club
9 July 2025	4	DF	(Australia) Winonah Heatley	(Denmark) Nordsjælland
14 July 2025	30	FW	(Nigeria) Rinsola Babajide	(Spain) Tenerife
14 July 2025	29	MF	(Germany) Annalena Rieke	(Germany) Essen
19 July 2025	78	DF	(Poland) Magda Piekarska	(Poland) Rekord Bielsko-Biała
24 July 2025	44	DF	(Dominican Republic) Samantha van Diemen	(Scotland) Glasgow City
28 July 2025	2	DF	(Denmark) Katrine Veje	(England) Crystal Palace
30 July 2025	23	DF	(Italy) Valentina Bergamaschi	(Italy) Juventus
1 August 2025	24	GK	(Italy) Rachele Baldi	(Italy) Fiorentina
8 January 2026	9	FW	(Norway) Frøya Dorsin	(France) PSG
15 January 2026	5	DF	(Canada) Maya Antoine	(Sweden) Norrköping

=== Loans In ===
Announcement date	No.	Position	Player	From club
25 August 2025	15	MF	(Italy) Giulia Dragoni	(Spain) Barcelona
2 February 2026	8	MF	(Hungary) Anna Csiki	(England) Tottenham

=== Contract extensions ===
Announcement date	No.	Position	Player	At AS Roma since
3 September 2025	1	GK	(Czech Republic) Olivie Lukášová	2024
3 September 2025	36	GK	(Italy) Valentina Soggiu	2023
13 October 2025	20	MF	(Italy) Giada Greggi	2018
21 October 2025	3	DF	(Italy) Lucia Di Guglielmo	2021

=== Transfers out ===
Announcement date	No.	Position	Player	To club
21 June 2025	2	DF	(Japan) Moeka Minami	(England) Brighton
30 June 2025	51	MF	(Denmark) Sanne Troelsgaard	(Denmark) Midtjylland
30 June 2025	30	GK	(Austria) Isabella Kresche	(United States) Tampa Bay Sun
30 June 2025	14	DF	(Switzerland) Eseosa Aigbogun	(France) Strasbourg
12 July 2025	23	DF	(France) Hawa Cissoko	(Italy) Parma
13 July 2025	12	GK	(Romania) Camelia Ceasar	(Italy) Parma
16 July 2025	18	FW	(Italy) Benedetta Glionna	(Italy) Inter
29 July 2025	9	FW	(Italy) Valentina Giacinti	(Turkey) Galatasaray
1 August 2025	32	DF	(Italy) Elena Linari	(England) London City Lionesses
31 December 2025	3	DF	(Italy) Lucia Di Guglielmo	(United States) Washington Spirit
24 January 2026	22	MF	(Denmark) Kathrine Møller Kühl	(Spain) Atlético Madrid

=== Loans out ===
Announcement date	No.	Position	Player	To club
16 July 2025	33	FW	(Slovenia) Zara Kramžar	(Italy) Como
16 July 2025	20	FW	(Italy) Giada Pellegrino Cimò	(Italy) Ternana
17 July 2025	29	FW	(Portugal) Cintia Martins	(Italy) Ternana
22 August 2025	48	MF	(South Korea) Kim Shin-ji	(Scotland) Rangers
23 February 2026	21	MF	(Canada) Mia Pante	(Canada) Vancouver Rise

== Suspensions ==
No.	Position	Player	Games suspended	Reason

== Pre-season ==
5 August 2025	Como (Italy)	0–1	Roma	Marilleva, Italy
17:00 CEST		Report	Galli 54'	Stadium: Mezzana Sports Field

10 August 2025	Inter (Italy)	2–2	Roma	Milan, Italy
18:00 CEST	Bugeja 46'; Wullaert 51'	Report	Viens 4'; Bergamaschi 62'	Stadium: Konami Youth Development Centre

17 August 2025	Roma	5–2	Napoli (Italy)	Rome, Italy
17:00 CEST	Viens 2' 7'; Pilgrim 34'; Haavi 75'; Galli 78'	Report	Trøan 44'; Sciabica 69'	Stadium: Giulio Onesti Olympic Preparation Center

== Competitions ==
=== League table ===
Pos	Team	Pld	W	D	L	GF	GA	GD	Pts	Qualification
1	Roma (C)	22	17	4	1	44	19	+25	55	Qualification for the Champions League league phase
2	Inter Milan	22	13	5	4	49	26	+23	44	Qualification for the Champions League third qualifying round
3	Juventus	22	11	6	5	33	19	+14	39	Qualification for the Champions League second qualifying round
4	Fiorentina	22	10	6	6	33	30	+3	36	
5	Lazio	22	10	3	9	31	30	+1	33	
6	Milan	22	9	5	8	31	26	+5	32	
7	Napoli	22	8	8	6	30	25	+5	32	
8	Como	22	8	6	8	24	22	+2	30	
9	Sassuolo	22	4	6	12	17	34	−17	18	
10	Ternana	22	4	5	13	19	40	−21	17	
11	Parma	22	2	10	10	16	31	−15	16	
12	Genoa (R)	22	2	4	16	18	43	−25	10	Relegation to Serie B

Source: Soccerway
Rules for classification: 1) Points; 2) Tiebreaker for the Champions League team and the relegated team; 3) Head-to-head points; 4) Head-to-head goal difference; 5) Goal difference; 6) Goals scored; 7) Draw
(C) Champions; (R) Relegated

=== Matches ===
5 October 2025 1	Roma	4–0	Parma	Rome
17:30 CEST	Corelli 9'; Babajide 28'; Giugliano 56'; Dragoni 73'	Report		Stadium: Stadio Tre Fontane; Referee: Mattia Maresca

12 October 2025 2	Milan	1–2	Roma	Milan
12:30 CEST	Mascarello (yellow card) 16'; Soffia (yellow card) 66'; de Sanders 76'	Report	Corelli 83'; Giugliano 90+1'	Stadium: Centro Sportivo Peppino Vismara; Referee: Migliorini Andrea

19 October 2025 3	Napoli	1–3	Roma	Cercola
12:30 CEST	Giordano (yellow card) 31'; Vanmechelen 90+1'	Report	Dragoni 46'; Corelli 49' 82'; van Diemen 90'	Stadium: Stadio Giuseppe Piccolo; Referee: Bruno Spina

2 November 2025 4	Roma	3–0	Inter	Rome
12:30 CET	Pandini 4'; Viens (yellow card) 53'; Dragoni 67'; Giugliano 90+4'	Report	Magull (yellow card) 44'; Tomašević (yellow card) 87'	Stadium: Stadio Tre Fontane; Referee: Dorillo Nicolò

9 November 2025 5	Fiorentina	5–2	Roma	Florence
20:00 CET	Omarsdottir 5'; Bredgaard 53' 55'; Bergamaschi 66' (o.g.); Woldvik 90+5'	Report	Heatley (yellow card) 10' (yellow-red card) 22'; Lombardi 64' (o.g.); Giugliano 71' (pen.) (yellow card) 72'; Galli (yellow card) 90+1'	Stadium: Stadio Curva Fiesole - Viola Park; Referee: Gianluca Guitaldi

16 November 2025 6	Roma	0–1	Lazio	Rome
15:30 CET	Di Guglielmo 29'	Report		Stadium: Stadio Tre Fontane; Referee: Stefano Striamo

23 November 2025 7	Como	0–1	Roma	Seregno
12:30 CET	Nischler (penalty missed) 13'	Report	Viens 44'; Corelli (yellow card) 78'	Stadium: Stadio Ferruccio Chittolina; Referee: Maksym Frasynyak

6 December 2025 8	Roma	1–1	Juventus	Rome
14:30 CET	Bergamaschi 12'; Rieke (yellow card) 56'	Report	Brighton (yellow card) 30'; Pinto 70'	Stadium: Stadio Tre Fontane; Referee: Giuseppe Maria Manzo

13 December 2025 9	Ternana	0–2	Roma	Terni
18:00 CET	Pirone (yellow card) 77'	Report	Dragoni 1'; Oladipo (yellow card) 17'; Corrado 26' (o.g.)	Stadium: Stadium Libero Liberati; Referee: Erminio Cerbasi

18 January 2026 10	Roma	2–1	Sassuolo	Rome
12:30 CET	Giugliano 3'; Rieke (yellow card) 26'; Corelli 79'	Report	Clelland 35' (yellow card) 66'; Missipo (yellow card) 90+5'	Stadium: Stadio Tre Fontane; Referee: Maria Marotta

25 January 2026 11	Genoa	0–1	Roma	Genoa
12:30 CET	Bahr (yellow card) 85'	Report	Giugliano 45'	Stadium: Stadio La Sciorba; Referee: Simone Gauzolino

1 February 2026 12	Parma	3–3	Roma	Parma
15:00 CET	Real 3'; Cox 42'; Benedetti 54'; Cissoko (yellow card) 66' (yellow-red card) 79'	Report	Giugliano 21' 80' (pen.); Greggi (yellow card) 35'; Babajide 90+9'	Stadium: Stadio Ennio Tardini; Referee: Roberto Lovison

8 February 2026 13	Roma	1–0	Milan	Rome
12:30 CET	Bergamaschi (yellow card) 58' (goal) 66'	Report	van Dooren (red card) 66'	Stadium: Stadio Tre Fontane; Referee: Simone Gavini

15 February 2026 14	Roma	2–2	Napoli	Rome
18:00 CET	Dorsin 21'; Giugliano 26'; Heatley (yellow card) 36'; Bergamaschi (yellow card) 64'	Report	Banusic 28' 38'	Stadium: Stadio Tre Fontane; Referee: Dario Di Francesco

22 February 2026 15	Inter	0–1	Roma	Sesto San Giovanni
15:30 CET	Andrés (yellow card) 58'; Polli (yellow card) 90+5'; Tomašević (yellow card) 90+9'	Report	Oladipo (yellow card) 19'; Viens 33'	Stadium: Stadio Ernesto Breda; Referee: Leonardo Mastrodomenico

15 March 2026 16	Roma	1–1	Fiorentina	Rome
18:00 CET	Rossettini (yellow card); Viens (yellow card) 47'; Galli 77'	Report	Janogy 43'; Lombardi (yellow card) 64'	Stadium: Stadio Tre Fontane; Referee: Domenico Mirabella

21 March 2026 17	Lazio	1–2	Roma	Rome
18:00 CET	Karczewska 38'; Connolly (yellow card) 89'	Report	Rossettini (red card); Giugliano 81'; Thøgersen 85'	Stadium: Stadio Mirko Fersini; Referee: Fabio Rosario Luongo

3 April 2023 18	Roma	4–3	Como	Rome
18:00 CEST	Chidiac 29'; Nischler 41'; Heatley 45' (o.g.); Vaitukaityte (yellow card) 52'	Report	Haavi 26' 28'; Viens 46'; Pilgrim 54'	Stadium: Stadio Tre Fontane; Referee: Mattia Maresca

26 April 2026 19	Juventus	0–1	Roma	Biella
12:30 CEST	Wälti (yellow card) 6'; Thomas (yellow card) 66'	Report	Bergamaschi (yellow card) 14'; Dragoni 59'	Stadium: Stadio Vittorio Pozzo; Referee: Riccardo Dasso

2 May 2026 20	Roma	2-0	Ternana	Rome
18:30 CEST	Giugliano 25' 71'	Report		Stadium: Stadio Tre Fontane; Referee: Mattia Maresca

10 May 2026 21	Sassuolo	0-3	Roma	Sassuolo
15:00 CEST		Report	Dorsin 45+2'; Galli 62'; Pilgrim 89' (yellow card) 90+2'	Stadium: Stadio Enzo Ricci; Referee: Davide Cerea

17 May 2026 21	Roma	2-0	Genoa	Rome
15:00 CEST	Dragoni 51' 72'; Heatley (yellow card) 59'	Report		Stadium: Stadio Tre Fontane; Referee: Maria Marotta

=== Serie A Women’s Cup ===
22 August 2025 1	Ternana	2–4	Roma	Terni
18:30 CEST	Pirone 24'; Regazzoli 81'	Report	Pilgrim 18' 29'; Corelli 22' (pen.); Rieke 57'	Stadium: Stadio Libero Liberati

6 September 2025 2	Roma	1–0	Milan	Rome
15:00 CEST	Galli 79'	Report	Koivisto (yellow card) 38'	Stadium: Stadio Tre Fontane

14 September 2025 3	Roma	3–0	Sassuolo	Rome
15:00 CEST	Babajide 21'; Greggi 45+4'; Pilgrim 88'	Report	Missipo 39'	Stadium: Stadio Tre Fontane

23 September 2025 Semi-Final	Roma	3–0	Lazio	Castellammare di Stabia
20:30 CEST	Haavi 22'; van Diemen (yellow card) 26'; Corelli 42'; Viens 81'	Report	D'Auria (yellow card) 34'; Castiello (yellow card) 90+3'	Stadium: Stadio Romeo Menti

27 September 2025 Final	Juventus	3–2	Roma	Castellammare di Stabia
17:30 CEST	Vangsgaard 4'; Brighton (yellow card) 41'; Bonansea 69'; Thomas 90+2'	Report	Haavi 30'; Giugliano 79'	Stadium: Stadio Romeo Menti

=== Coppa Italia ===
6 November 2025 Round of 16	Lumezzane	1–4	Roma	Lumezzane
12:30 CET	Burbassi 28'	Report	Pandini 36'; Giugliano 57' (pen.); Viens 59' 61'; Corelli 78'; Haavi 88'; Greggi 90+3'	Stadium: Stadio Tullio Saleri

21 January 2026 Quarter-Final Leg 1	Lazio	0–0	Roma	Formello
20:30 CET	Castiello (yellow card) 80'	Report		Stadium: Centro sportivo di Formello; Referee: Gerardo Simone Caruso

28 January 2026 Quarter-Final Leg 2	Roma	3–0 (3–0 agg.)	Lazio	Rome
18:00 CET	Corelli 5'; Viens 27' 28'	Report		Stadium: Stadio Tre Fontane; Referee: Leonardo Di Mario

12 March 2026 Semi-Final Leg 1	Roma	1–1	Inter	Rome
18:00 CET	Milinković (yellow card) 30'; Andrés (yellow card) 65'; Wullaert 88'	Report	Greggi 52'	Stadium: Stadio Tre Fontane; Referee: Deborah Bianchi

28 March 2026 Semi-Final Leg 2	Inter	1–2 (3–2 agg.)	Roma	Sesto San Giovanni
18:00 CET	Tomaselli (yellow card) 30'; Magull (yellow card) 75'; Vilhjálmsdóttir 90'	Report	Giugliano 27'; Viens 39'	Stadium: Stadio Ernesto Breda; Referee: Filippo Colaninno

24 May 2026 Final	Juventus	0-1	Roma	Vicenza
18:00 CEST		Report	Giugliano 80'	Stadium: Stadio Romeo Menti; Referee: Silvia Gasperotti

=== Supercoppa ===
11 January 2025 Final	Juventus	2–1	Roma	Pescara
15:00 CET	Vangsgaard 40'; Girelli 85'	Report	Giugliano 23'; Viens (yellow card) 37'; Rossetini (yellow card) 48'	Stadium: Stadio Adriatico - Giovanni Cornacchia; Referee: Deborah Bianchi

=== UEFA Women's Champions League ===
Having came 3rd in the 2024–25 Serie A, Roma will enter the Champions League in the second qualifying round.

==== Second qualifying round ====
27 August 2025 Semi-Final	Roma (Italy)	2–0	(Kazakhstan) Aktobe	Prague
15:00 CEST	Pandini 40'; Galli 41'	Report		Stadium: Stadion Lokomotiva Praha; Attendance: 98; Referee: Louise Thompson (Northern Ireland)

30 August 2025 Final	Roma (Italy)	2–0	(Czech Republic) Sparta Prague	Prague
15:00 CEST	Haavi 30'; Di Guglielmo 52'; Giugliano 55', 72'; Pandini 79'	Report	Dědinová 87'	Stadium: Stadion SK Prosek; Attendance: 407; Referee: Lotta Vuorio (Finland)

==== Third qualifying round ====
11 September 2025 1st Leg	Roma (Italy)	1–2	(Portugal) Sporting	Rome
20:30 CEST	Di Guglielmo 23'; Rieke (yellow card) 30'; Greggi (yellow card) 88'; Pandini (yellow card) 90+4'	Report	Santiago 90+2'; Arques (yellow card) 90+4'; Encarnação 90+7'	Stadium: Stadio Tre Fontane; Attendance: 1,371; Referee: Frida Klarlund (Denmark)

18 September 2025 2nd Leg	Sporting (Portugal)	0–2 (2–3 agg.)	(Italy) Roma	Santarém
17:30 CEST	Eaton-Collins (yellow card) 45'; Hernandez Gray (yellow card) 45'	Report	Barron 45+6' (o.g.); Bergamaschi 62'	Stadium: Estádio Municipal de Rio Maior; Attendance: 989; Referee: Katalin Kulcsár (Hungary)

==== League Phase ====
8 October 2025 1	Real Madrid (Spain)	6–2	(Italy) Roma	Madrid
18:45 CEST	Redondo 6' 42'; Weir 23' (yellow card) 26' (goal) 59'; Lakrar 53'; Navarro 73'	Report	Viens 16'; Haavi 35'	Stadium: Alfredo Di Stéfano; Attendance: 1,440; Referee: Iuliana Demetrescu (Romania)

15 October 2025 2	Roma (Italy)	0–4	(Spain) Barcelona	Rome
21:00 CEST	Corelli (yellow card) 90+4'	Report	Brugts 2'; Putellas (penalty missed) 13' 71' (pen.); Nazareth 58'; Graham Hansen 90'	Stadium: Stadio Tre Fontane; Attendance: 2,731; Referee: Ivana Martinčić (Croatia)

11 November 2025 3	Roma (Italy)	0–1	(Norway) Vålerenga	Rome
18:45CET	Rieke (yellow card) 50'	Report	Brekken 40'; Tvedten (yellow card) 75'	Stadium: Stadio Tre Fontane; Attendance: 1,562; Referee: Michaela Pachtová (Czech Republic)

20 November 2025 4	OH Leuven (Belgium)	1–1	(Italy) Roma	Leuven
15:00 CET	Nagy (yellow card) 42'; Conijnenberg 71' (pen.); Everaerts (yellow card) 90+3'	Report	Viens 18'; Giugliano (yellow card) 68'; Bergamaschi (yellow card) 70'	Stadium: Den Dreef; Attendance: 4,306; Referee: Hristiyana Guteva (Bulgaria)

10 December 2025 5	Chelsea (England)	6–0	(Italy) Roma	London
21:00 CET	Bergamaschi 13' (o.g.); Kaptein 26'; Rytting Kaneryd 44'; Nüsken 51' (pen.); Hamano 76'; Bronze 86'	Report		Stadium: Stamford Bridge; Attendance: 3,914; Referee: Ewa Augustyn (Poland)

17 December 2025 6	Roma (Italy)	6–1	(Austria) St. Pölten	Rome
21:00 CET	Pilgrim 19'; Viens 33' 60' 67'; Dragoni 76'; Bergamaschi (yellow card) 79'; Corelli 84'	Report	Gutmann (yellow card) 6'; Aistleitner (yellow card) 88'	Stadium: Stadio Tre Fontane; Attendance: 1,214; Referee: Frida Klarlund
