= 2026–27 AS Roma (women) season =

AS Roma
2026–27 season
- Manager: Gianpiero Piovani
- Stadium: Stadio Tre Fontane
- Serie A: 1st
- Coppa Italia: Quarter-finals
- Supercoppa: Final
- Women's Cup: Final
- Champions League: League phase
Home colours	Away colours	Third colours
- All statistics correct as of 1 October 2026.

The 2026–27 season is AS Roma's 9th season in Italy's first league. The club is participating in the Serie A Femminile, the Coppa Italia, the Supercoppa Italiana and the Champions League.

== Squad information & statistics ==
=== First team squad ===
No.	Name	Date of Birth (Age)	Since	Last Contract	Signed from
Goalkeepers
1	(Czech Republic) Olivie Lukášová	4 June 2001 (age 25)	2024	September 2025	(Czech Republic) Slavia Prague
24	(Italy) Rachele Baldi	2 October 1994 (age 32)	2025	August 2025	(Italy) Fiorentina
36	(Italy) Valentina Soggiu	1 January 2003 (age 23)	2023	September 2025	(Italy) Juventus
Defenders
4	(Australia) Wini Heatley	18 June 2001 (age 25)	2025	July 2025	(Denmark) Nordsjælland
5	(Canada) Maya Antoine	8 August 2001 (age 25)	2026	January 2026	(Sweden) Norrköping
12	(Canada) Ella Ottey	12 August 2005 (age 21)	2026	July 2026	(United States) University of Wisconsin–Madison
13	(Italy) Elisabetta Oliviero	18 July 1997 (age 29)	2026	July 2026	(Italy) Lazio
19	(Nigeria) Shukurat Oladipo	22 September 2004 (age 22)	2025	February 2025	(Nigeria) Robo
23	(Italy) Valentina Bergamaschi	22 January 1997 (age 29)	2025	July 2025	(Italy) Juventus
25	(Denmark) Frederikke Thøgersen	24 July 1995 (age 31)	2024	July 2024	(Italy) Inter
32	(Italy) Bianca Vergani	1 November 2002 (age 24)	2026	July 2026	(Italy) Napoli
78	(Poland) Magda Piekarska	9 September 2007 (age 19)	2025	July 2025	(Poland) Rekord Bielsko-Biała
Midfielders
6	(United States) Maya Doms	11 May 2001 (age 25)	2026	July 2026	(Italy) Sassuolo
8	(Netherlands) Kayleigh van Dooren	31 July 1999 (age 27)	2026	August 2026	(Italy) Milan
10	(Italy) Manuela Giugliano (c)	18 August 1997 (age 29)	2019	December 2023	(Italy) Milan
20	(Italy) Giada Greggi	18 February 2000 (age 26)	2018	October 2025	(Italy) Res Roma
22	(Italy) Marta Pandini	21 March 1998 (age 28)	2024	February 2024	(Italy) Inter
29	(Germany) Annalena Rieke	10 January 1999 (age 27)	2025	July 2025	(Germany) Essen
Forwards
7	(Finland) Sofia Jahnukainen	12 November 2006 (age 20)	2026	July 2026	(Finland) HJK Helsinki
11	(Switzerland) Alayah Pilgrim	29 April 2003 (age 23)	2024	January 2024	(Switzerland) Zürich
14	(Italy) Giada Pellegrino Cimò	7 October 2006 (age 20)	2022	N/A	Homegrown
16	(Italy) Alice Corelli	28 November 2003 (age 22)	2020	July 2023	Homegrown
18	(Italy) Martina Piemonte	7 November 1997 (age 29)	2026	July 2023	(Italy) Lazio
30	(Nigeria) Rinsola Babajide	17 June 1998 (age 28)	2025	July 2025	(Spain) Tenerife

=== Statistics ===
Statistics as of 1 August 2026

==== Appearances and goals ====
No.	Name	Serie A Femminile		Serie A Women's Cup		Coppa Italia		Supercoppa		UWCL		Total	
No.	Name	Apps	Goals	Apps	Goals	Apps	Goals	Apps	Goals	Apps	Goals	Apps	Goals
Goalkeepers
1	(Czech Republic) Olivie Lukášová	0	0	0	0	0	0	0	0	0	0	0	0
24	(Italy) Rachele Baldi	0	0	0	0	0	0	0	0	0	0	0	0
36	(Italy) Valentina Soggiu	0	0	0	0	0	0	0	0	0	0	0	0
Defenders
4	(Australia) Wini Heatley	0	0	0	0	0	0	0	0	0	0	0	0
5	(Canada) Maya Antoine	0	0	0	0	0	0	0	0	0	0	0	0
12	(Canada) Ella Ottey	0	0	0	0	0	0	0	0	0	0	0	0
13	(Italy) Elisabetta Oliviero	0	0	0	0	0	0	0	0	0	0	0	0
19	(Nigeria) Shukurat Oladipo	0	0	0	0	0	0	0	0	0	0	0	0
23	(Italy) Valentina Bergamaschi	0	0	0	0	0	0	0	0	0	0	0	0
25	(Denmark) Frederikke Thøgersen	0	0	0	0	0	0	0	0	0	0	0	0
32	(Italy) Bianca Vergani	0	0	0	0	0	0	0	0	0	0	0	0
78	(Poland) Magda Piekarska	0	0	0	0	0	0	0	0	0	0	0	0
Midfielders
6	(United States) Maya Doms	0	0	0	0	0	0	0	0	0	0	0	0
8	(Netherlands) Kayleigh van Dooren	0	0	0	0	0	0	0	0	0	0	0	0
10	(Italy) Manuela Giugliano	0	0	0	0	0	0	0	0	0	0	0	0
20	(Italy) Giada Greggi	0	0	0	0	0	0	0	0	0	0	0	0
22	(Italy) Marta Pandini	0	0	0	0	0	0	0	0	0	0	0	0
29	(Germany) Annalena Rieke	0	0	0	0	0	0	0	0	0	0	0	0
Forwards
7	(Finland) Sofia Jahnukainen	0	0	0	0	0	0	0	0	0	0	0	0
11	(Switzerland) Alayah Pilgrim	0	0	0	0	0	0	0	0	0	0	0	0
14	(Italy) Giada Pellegrino Cimò	0	0	0	0	0	0	0	0	0	0	0	0
16	(Italy) Alice Corelli	0	0	0	0	0	0	0	0	0	0	0	0
18	(Italy) Martina Piemonte	0	0	0	0	0	0	0	0	0	0	0	0
30	(Nigeria) Rinsola Babajide	0	0	0	0	0	0	0	0	0	0	0	0

==== Goalscorers ====
Rank	No.	Position	Name	Serie A Femminile	Serie A Women's Cup	Coppa Italia	Supercoppa	UWCL	Total

== Transfers, loans and other signings ==
=== Transfers in ===
Announcement date	No.	Position	Player	From club
27 July 2026	18	FW	(Italy) Martina Piemonte	(Italy) Lazio
27 July 2026	7	FW	(Finland) Sofia Jahnukainen	(Finland) HJK Helsinki
27 July 2026	13	DF	(Italy) Elisabetta Oliviero	(Italy) Lazio
28 July 2026	6	MF	(United States) Maya Doms	(Italy) Sassuolo
28 July 2026	32	DF	(Italy) Bianca Vergani	(Italy) Napoli
28 July 2026	12	DF	(Canada) Ella Ottey	(United States) University of Wisconsin–Madison
28 August 2026	8	DF	(Netherlands) Kayleigh van Dooren	(Italy) Milan

=== Loans In ===
Announcement date	No.	Position	Player	From club

=== Contract extensions ===
Announcement date	No.	Position	Player	At AS Roma since
15 July 2026	25	DF	(Denmark) Frederikke Thøgersen	2024
15 July 2026	19	DF	(Nigeria) Shukurat Oladipo	2025

=== Transfers out ===
Announcement date	No.	Position	Player	To club
28 May 2026	11	FW	(Norway) Emilie Haavi	(Italy) Como 1907
10 June 2026	7	FW	(Canada) Evelyne Viens	(France) Paris FC
28 June 2026	6	MF	(Hungary) Anna Csiki	(Portugal) Benfica
28 June 2026	9	FW	(Norway) Frøya Dorsin	(Portugal) Benfica
30 June 2026	6	DF	(Spain) Oihane Valdezate	(United States) Chicago Stars
14 July 2026	33	FW	(Slovenia) Zara Kramžar	(England) Everton
14 July 2026	29	FW	(Italy) Cintia Martins	(Italy) Ternana
18 July 2026	44	DF	(Dominican Republic) Samantha van Diemen	(Italy) Inter
27 July 2026	16	MF	(Italy) Giulia Dragoni	(Spain) Chelsea
2 September 2026	2	DF	(Denmark) Katrine Veje	(Mexico) Toluca
5 September 2026	47	FW	(Italy) Giulia Galli	(Spain) Barcelona B
19 September 2026	53	DF	(Italy) Martina Cherubini	(Italy) Brescia

=== Loans out ===
Announcement date	No.	Position	Player	To club
9 July 2026	35	FW	(Italy) Rosanna Ventriglia	(Italy) Ternana
10 July 2026	57	MF	(Italy) Sofia Testa	(Italy) Ternana
14 July 2026	48	MF	(South Korea) Kim Shin-ji	(Spain) Alavés

== Suspensions ==
No.	Position	Player	Games suspended	Reason

== Competitions ==
=== League table ===
Pos	Team	Pld	W	D	L	GF	GA	GD	Pts	Qualification
1	Roma	6	6	0	0	21	7	+14	18	Qualification for the Champions League league phase
2	Inter Milan	6	5	1	0	13	0	+13	16	Qualification for the Champions League third qualifying round
3	Como 1907	6	3	2	1	13	11	+2	11	Qualification for the Champions League second qualifying round
4	Fiorentina	6	3	1	2	10	6	+4	10	
5	Juventus	6	3	0	3	12	14	−2	9	
6	FC Como	6	2	2	2	4	5	−1	8	
7	Ternana	6	2	1	3	5	11	−6	7	
8	Milan	6	2	0	4	8	13	−5	6	
9	Napoli	6	1	2	3	7	8	−1	5	
10	Parma	6	1	2	3	3	7	−4	5	
11	Lazio	6	0	3	3	1	7	−6	3	
12	Sassuolo	6	0	2	4	5	13	−8	2	Relegation to the Serie B

Updated to match(es) played on 8 November 2026. Source: Soccerway
Rules for classification: 1) Points; 2) Tiebreaker for the Champions League team and the relegated team; 3) Head-to-head points; 4) Head-to-head goal difference; 5) Goal difference; 6) Goals scored; 7) Draw

=== UEFA Women's Champions League ===
Pos	Team	Pld	W	D	L	GF	GA	GD	Pts	Qualification
7	(Italian Football Federation) Juventus (T)	5	3	0	2	10	9	+1	9	Advance to the knockout phase play-offs (seeded)
8	(The Football Association) Arsenal (T)	5	2	2	1	7	5	+2	8	Advance to the knockout phase play-offs (seeded)
9	(Italian Football Federation) Roma	5	2	1	2	5	11	−6	7	Advance to the knockout phase play-offs (unseeded)
10	(Portuguese Football Federation) Benfica	5	2	0	3	7	11	−4	6	Advance to the knockout phase play-offs (unseeded)
11	(French Football Federation) Paris Saint-Germain	5	1	2	2	8	5	+3	5	Advance to the knockout phase play-offs (unseeded)

Updated to match(es) played on 19 November 2026. Source: UEFA
Rules for classification: League phase tiebreakers
(T) Qualified, but not yet for the particular phase indicated

Having won the 2025–26 Serie A, Roma entered the Champions League in the league phase.

==== League Phase ====
23 September 2026 1	OH Leuven (Belgium)	0–0	(Italy) Roma	Leuven
18:45 CET		Report	Greggi (yellow card) 47'; Piemonte (yellow card) 70'; Pandini (penalty missed) 90'	Stadium: Den Dreef; Attendance: 1,484; Referee: Frida Klarlund (Denmark)

30 September 2026 2	Roma (Italy)	0–6	(Spain) Barcelona	Rome
18:45 CET		Report	Graham Hansen 19', 60'; Oladipo 39' (o.g.); Pina 53', 75'; Paredes (yellow card) 72'; Pajor 85'	Stadium: Stadio Tre Fontane; Attendance: 2,460; Referee: Kirsty Dowle (England)

28 October 2026 3	Chelsea (England)	2–0	(Italy) Roma	London
17:45 CET	Carpenter 51'; Buchanan 89'	Report		Stadium: Cherry Red Records Stadium; Attendance: 2,510; Referee: Olatz Rivera Olmedo (Spain)

10 November 2026 4	Roma (Italy)	2–1	(Switzerland) Servette	Rome
20:00 CET	Oliviero (yellow card) 8'; Van Dooren 25'; Pilgrim 34'; Heatley (yellow card) 90+2'	Report	Marinelli 73' (pen.); Hernández (yellow card) 90+1'	Stadium: Stadio Tre Fontane; Attendance: 1,083; Referee: Catarina Campos (Portugal)

19 November 2026 5	Benfica (Portugal)	2–3	(Italy) Roma	Lisbon
20:00 CET	Møller 40'; Sabastine 66'; Demehin (yellow card) 72'	Report	Van Dooren 17', 54'; Doms (yellow card) 23'; Heatley (yellow card) 32'; Jahnukainen 90+3'	Stadium: Estádio da Luz; Referee: Iuliana Demetrescu (Romania)

16 December 2026 6	Roma (Italy)	v	(Spain) Real Madrid	Rome
20:00 CET		Report		Stadium: Stadio Tre Fontane
