= 2025 Serie A Women's Cup =

Tournament details
- Country: Italy
- Dates: 22 August – 27 September 2025
- Teams: 12

Final positions
- Champions: Juventus (1st title)
- Runners-up: Roma

Tournament statistics
- Matches played: 21
- Goals scored: 61 (2.9 per match)
- Top goal scorer: Alayah Pilgrim (3)
- Goals scored in penalty shoot-outs not included.

The 2025 Serie A Women's Cup was the inaugural season of the Serie A Women's Cup, the league cup competition for the Serie A Women, the top division of Italian women's football.

The competition commenced on 22 August and concluded on 27 September. The semi-finals and the final were held at Stadio Romeo Menti in Castellammare di Stabia, Campania.

Juventus won the inaugural Serie A Women's Cup title, defeating Roma 3–2 in the final.

== Teams ==
All 12 teams in the 2025–26 Serie A Femminile are participating in the competition. Each team was given a rank based on their position in the 2024–25 Serie A Femminile, or for the 2024–25 Serie B Femminile for the newly-promoted team, Ternana.

== Group stage ==
=== Group A ===
Pos	Team	Pld	W	D	L	GF	GA	GD	Pts	Qualification	LAZ	JUV	PAR	NAP
1	Lazio	3	3	0	0	6	2	+4	9	Advance to the semi-finals			3–1	2–1
2	Juventus	3	2	0	1	6	1	+5	6	Advance to the semi-finals	0–1			4–0
3	Parma	3	0	1	2	3	7	−4	1			0–2		
4	Napoli	3	0	1	2	3	8	−5	1				2–2	

Source: FIGC

22 August 2025	Parma	0–2	Juventus	Parma
20:30 CEST		Report	Girelli 41'; Bonansea 90+1'	Stadium: Stadio Ennio Tardini

23 August 2025	Lazio	2–1	Napoli	Formello
20:30 CEST	Karczewska 81'; Visentin 85'	Report	Fløe 35'	Stadium: Centro Sportivo di Formello

7 September 2025	Juventus	0–1	Lazio	Biella
15:00 CEST		Report	Visentin 90+3'	Stadium: Stadio La Marmora-Pozzo

7 September 2025	Napoli	2–2	Parma	Cercola
15:00 CEST	Brooks 41'; Barker 55'	Report	Distefano 36'; Kaján 90+1'	Stadium: Stadio Giuseppe Piccolo

13 September 2025	Juventus	4–0	Napoli	Biella
12:30 CEST	Stølen Godø 17'; Girelli 37' (pen.); Pinto 67', 90+5'	Report		Stadium: Stadio La Marmora-Pozzo

13 September 2025	Lazio	3–1	Parma	Formello
12:30 CEST	Simonetti 16'; Piemonte 37'; Oliviero 45'	Report	Cox 84'	Stadium: Centro Sportivo Di Formello

=== Group B ===
Pos	Team	Pld	W	D	L	GF	GA	GD	Pts	Qualification	INT	FIO	COM	GEN
1	Inter Milan	3	2	0	1	5	3	+2	6	Advance to the semi-finals		3–1	0–1	
2	Fiorentina	3	2	0	1	5	4	+1	6				2–0	2–1
3	Como	3	1	1	1	2	3	−1	4					1–1
4	Genoa	3	0	1	2	3	5	−2	1		1–2			

Source: FIGC

22 August 2025	Genoa	1–2	Inter Milan	Genoa
18:30 CEST	Mele 88'	Report	Bartoli 25'; Bugeja 38'	Stadium: Stadio La Sciorba

23 August 2025	Fiorentina	2–0	Como	Bagno a Ripoli
18:30 CEST	Curmark 22'; Færge 75'	Report		Stadium: Viola Park

6 September 2025	Inter Milan	3–1	Fiorentina	Milan
18:00 CEST	Polli 2'; Vilhjálmsdóttir 41'; Bugeja 78'	Report	Bredgaard 68'	Stadium: Arena Civica

7 September 2025	Como	1–1	Genoa	Seregno
20:30 CEST	Kruse Madsen 45'	Report	Bargi 86'	Stadium: Stadio Ferruccio

14 September 2025	Fiorentina	2–1	Genoa	Bagno a Ripoli
12:30 CEST	Omarsdottir 40'; Severini 54' (pen.)	Report	Cinotti	Stadium: Viola Park

14 September 2025	Inter Milan	0–1	Como	Milan
12:30 CEST		Report	Lehmann 78'	Stadium: Arena Civica

=== Group C ===
Pos	Team	Pld	W	D	L	GF	GA	GD	Pts	Qualification	ROM	SAS	MIL	TER
1	Roma	3	3	0	0	8	2	+6	9	Advance to the semi-finals		3–0	1–0	
2	Sassuolo	3	1	1	1	3	4	−1	4					1–1
3	Milan	3	1	0	2	2	4	−2	3			0–2		2–1
4	Ternana	3	0	1	2	4	7	−3	1		2–4			

Source: FIGC

22 August 2025	Ternana	2–4	Roma	Narni
18:30 CEST	Pirone 24'; Regazzoli 82'	Report	Pilgrim 17', 28'; Corelli 21' (pen.); Rieke 57'	Stadium: Stadio Moreno Gubbiotti

24 August 2025	Milan	0–2	Sassuolo	Fiorenzuola d'Arda
20:30 CEST		Report	Clelland 71'; Dhont 87'	Stadium: Velodromo Attilio Pavesi

6 September 2025	Roma	1–0	Milan	Rome
15:00 CEST	Galli 79'	Report		Stadium: Stadio Tre Fontane

7 September 2025	Sassuolo	1–1	Ternana	Sassuolo
17:30 CEST	Perselli 83'	Report	Lázaro 55'	Stadium: Stadio Enzo Ricci

14 September 2025	Milan	2–1	Ternana	Firenzuola d'Arda
15:00 CEST	Van Dooren 58'; Appiah 67'	Report	Pirone 24'	Stadium: Velodromo Attilio Pavesi

14 September 2025	Roma	3–0	Sassuolo	Rome
15:00 CEST	Babajide 22'; Greggi 45+4'; Pilgrim 87'	Report		Stadium: Stadio Tre Fontane

=== Ranking of second-placed teams ===
Pos	Grp	Team	Pld	W	D	L	GF	GA	GD	Pts	Qualification
1	B	Juventus	3	2	0	1	6	1	+5	6	Advance to the semi-finals
2	A	Fiorentina	3	2	0	1	5	4	+1	6	
3	C	Sassuolo	3	1	1	1	3	4	−1	4	

Source: FIGC

== Knockout stage ==
=== Bracket ===
Semi-finals
23 September 2025
Roma	3
Lazio	0
24 September 2025
Juventus	2
Inter Milan	1

Final
27 September 2025
Juventus	3
Roma	2

=== Semi-finals ===
23 September 2025	Roma	3–0	Lazio	Castellammare
20:30 CEST	Haavi 22'; Corelli 42'; Viens 81'	Report		Stadium: Stadio Romeo Menti

24 September 2025	Juventus	2–1	Inter Milan	Castellammare
18:30 CEST	Cambiaghi 45'; Schatzer 64'	Report	Wullaert 67'	Stadium: Stadio Romeo Menti

=== Final ===
27 September 2025
17:30

Juventus	3–2	Roma
Vangsgaard 9'; Bonansea 69'; Thomas 90+2'	Report	Haavi 33'; Giugliano 79'

Stadio Romeo Menti, Castellammare

== Statistics ==
=== Top goalscorers ===
Rank	Player	Club	Goals
1	(Switzerland) Alayah Pilgrim	Roma	3
2	(Italy) Barbara Bonansea	Juventus	2
2	(Italy) Haley Bugeja	Inter Milan	2
2	(Italy) Alice Corelli	Roma	2
2	(Italy) Cristiana Girelli	Juventus	2
2	(Norway) Emilie Haavi	Roma	2
2	(Portugal) Tatiana Pinto	Juventus	2
2	(Italy) Valeria Pirone	Ternana	2
2	(Italy) Noemi Visentin	Lazio	2
