= 2025–26 Coppa Italia (women) =

2025–26 Coppa Italia Women
Tournament details
- Country: Italy
- Dates: 31 August 2025 – 24-25 May 2026
- Teams: 26

Final positions
- Champions: Roma (3rd title)
- Runners-up: Juventus

Tournament statistics
- Matches played: 30
- Goals scored: 95 (3.17 per match)
- Top goal scorer(s): (Canada) Evelyne Viens (5 goals)
- Goals scored in penalty shootouts not included.

The 2025–26 Coppa Italia Women is the 54th and current season of the Coppa Italia Women, the Italian national women's football cup competition. It began on 31 August 2025 and will conclude on 24 or 25 May 2026.

Juventus were the defending champions, having won their fourth title in the 2024–25 season as part of their domestic double. They were defeated in the final by Roma, who also secured the domestic double and their third Coppa Italia title.

== Participating teams ==
All 12 Serie A Women teams and all 14 Serie B Women teams participate in the Coppa Italia Women. However, each team enters at a different stage depending on their ranking (based on their league position in the previous season).

Second round
Rank	Team
Serie A
1	Juventus
2	Inter Milan
3	Roma
4	Fiorentina
5	Milan
6	Lazio
7	FC Como
8	Sassuolo

First round
Rank	Team
Serie A
9	Napoli
10	Ternana
11	Parma
12	Genoa
Serie B
13	Bologna
14	Lumezzane
15	Como 1907
16	Cesena
17	Brescia
18	Donna Rome
19	Arezzo
20	Freedom
21	Hellas Verona
22	San Marino

Prelim round
Rank	Team
Serie B
23	Trastevere
24	Venezia
25	Frosinone
26	Vicenza

== Preliminary round ==
Number of teams per tier still in competition
Serie A (Note: Four Serie A teams entered in the first round, while the remaining eight entered in the second round)	Serie B (Note: 10 Serie B teams entered in the first round)	Total
12 / 12	14 / 14	24 / 26

31 August 2025	Trastevere (2)	2–2 (a.e.t.) (4–2 p)	Vicenza (2)	Rome
17:00 CEST	Antonelli 14'; Lombardo 44'	Report	Parodi 10', 90'	Stadium: Trastevere Stadium; Referee: Ciro Riglia (Ercolano)
	Penalties
	Orlando (penalty scored); Zito (penalty scored); Pizzuti (penalty scored); Verrino (penalty scored)		(penalty scored) Tarenzi; (penalty scored) Missiaggia; (penalty missed) Nava; (penalty missed) Boveri

31 August 2025	Venezia	1–0	Frosinone (2)	Venice
17:00 CEST	Mounecif 76'	Report		Stadium: Campo Sportivo Giuseppe Taliercio; Referee: Nenad Radovanović (Maniago)

== First round ==
Number of teams per tier still in competition
Serie A (Note: Eight Serie A teams entered in the second round)	Serie B	Total
12 / 12	12 / 14	24 / 26

20 September 2025	Venezia (2)	1–5	Napoli (1)	Venice
14:30 CEST	Zuanti 71'	Report	Banušić 5'; Carcassi 18', 73'; Fløe 29'; Vanmechelen 67'	Stadium: Campo Sportivo Giuseppe Taliercio; Referee: Gianluca Toselli (Gradisca d'Isonzo)

21 September 2025	Brescia (2)	1–2	Cesena (2)	Brescia
15:00 CEST	Mariani	Report	Zamboni 75'; Bison 90'	Stadium: Centro Sportivo Mario Rigamonti; Referee: Davide Moro (Novi Ligure)

21 September 2025	Hellas Verona (2)	0–4	Genoa (1)	Verona
15:00 CEST		Report	Söndergaard 27', 48'; Cinotti 50'; Bargi 84'	Stadium: Stadio Aldo Olivieri; Referee: Giuseppe Gargano (Bologna)

21 September 2025	Freedom (2)	3–4 (a.e.t.)	Bologna (2)	Cuneo
15:00 CEST	Giovagnoli 16' (o.g.); Kaabachi 62' (pen.); Scherlizin 66'	Report	Martišková 20'; Rognoni 52', 84'; Fusar Poli 108'	Stadium: Stadio Fratelli Paschiero; Referee: Mirko Pelaia (Pavia)

21 September 2025	Arezzo (2)	0–1	Lumezzane (2)	Arezzo
15:00 CEST			Pinna	Stadium: Stadio Communale Bruno Nespoli; Referee: Alessandro Dallagà (Rovigo)

21 September 2025	San Marino (2)	0–4	Parma (1)	Acquaviva
15:00 CEST		Report	Cox 33'; Pinther 36'; Esteve 39'; Kaján 90'	Stadium: Campo Sportivo Acquaviva; Referee: Vittorio Umberto Branzoni (Mestre)

21 September 2025	Trastevere (2)	0–3	Ternana (1)	Rome
15:00 CEST		Report	Pellegrino Cimò 10'; Breitner 34'; Martins 68'	Stadium: Trastevere Stadium; Referee: Andrea Augello (Agrigento)

21 September 2025	Donna Rome (2)	2–3	Como 1907 (2)	Rome
15:00 CEST	Palombi 58'; Petrova 75'	Report	Pisani 28'; Del Estal 32'; Boquete 42'	Stadium: Centro Sportivo Raimondo Vianello; Referee: Paul Aka Iheukwumere (L'Aquila)

== Second round ==
Number of teams per tier still in competition
Serie A	Serie B	Total
12 / 12	4 / 14	16 / 26

20 December 2025	Napoli (1)	3–1	Sassuolo (1)	Cercola
12:30 CET	Kozak 40'; Fløe 64'; Vanmechelen 90+3'	Report	Dhont 75'	Stadium: Stadio Giuseppe Piccolo; Referee: Edoardo Pancini (Aprilia)

20 December 2025	Ternana (1)	2–1	FC Como (1)	Narni
12:30 CET	Pirone 2'; Corrado 22'	Report	Sagen 89'	Stadium: Stadio Moreno Gubbiotti; Referee: Andrea Barbatelli (Macerata)

21 December 2025	Lumezzane (2)	1–4	Roma (1)	Lumezzane
13:30 CET	Burbassi 28'	Report	Pandini 36'; Giugliano 57' (pen.); Viens 59', 61'	Stadium: Stadio Tullio Saleri; Referee: Luca Tuderti (Reggio Emilia)

21 December 2025	Cesena (2)	1–7	Juventus (1)	Cesena
14:30 CET	Zamboni 14'	Report	Cambiaghi 7', 21'; Librán 12'; Krumbiegel 19', 51'; Rosucci 75'; Vangsgaard 87'	Stadium: Impianto Sportivo Martorano; Referee: Luca Pasqualini (Macerata)

21 December 2025	Genoa (1)	2–3	Milan (1)	Genoa
14:30 CET	Söndergaard 56'; Hilaj 75'	Report	Ijeh 26'; Kyvåg 34'; Soffia 81'	Stadium: Stadio La Sciorba; Referee: Cosimo Papi (Prato)

21 December 2025	Bologna (2)	1–1 (a.e.t.) (2–4 p)	Fiorentina (1)	Granarolo dell'Emilia
14:30 CET	Fracaros 83'	Report	Tryggvadóttir 36'	Stadium: Campo Sportivo Luciano Bonarelli; Referee: Nicole Puntel (Tolmezzo)
	Penalties
	Cavallin (penalty missed); Vecchio (penalty scored); Re (penalty scored); Passeri (penalty missed)		(penalty scored) Severini; (penalty scored) Bredgaard; (penalty scored) Tryggvadóttir; (penalty scored) Orsi

21 December 2025	Parma (1)	0–1 (a.e.t.)	Lazio (1)	Parma
14:30 CET		Report	Visentin 98'	Stadium: Stadio Ennio Tardini; Referee: Alessio Artini (Florence)

21 December 2025	Como 1907 (2)	1–2	Inter Milan (1)	Erba
14:30 CET	Čonč 53'	Report	Bugeja 28'; Tomašević 73'	Stadium: Centro Sportivo Lambrone; Referee: Marco Schmid (Rovereto)

== Quarter finals ==
Number of teams per tier still in competition
Serie A	Serie B	Total
8 / 12	0 / 14	8 / 26

Team 1	Agg.	Team 2	1st leg	2nd leg
Milan	1–2	Fiorentina	1–1	0–1
Ternana	0–6	Inter Milan	0–2	0–4
Lazio	0–3	Roma	0–0	0–3
Napoli	2–4	Juventus	1–2	1–2

20 January 2026	Milan (1)	1–1	Fiorentina (1)	Solbiate Arno
18:00	Arrigoni 73'	Report	Woldvik 10'	Stadium: Stadio Felice Chinetti; Referee: Alessandro Pizzi (Bergamo)

29 January 2026	Fiorentina (1)	1–0	Milan (1)	Bagno a Ripoli
18:00	Bredgaard 90+1'	Report		Stadium: Viola Park; Referee: Andrea Zoppi (Florence)

21 January 2026	Ternana (1)	0–2	Inter Milan (1)	Narni
18:00		Report	Detruyer 26'; Glionna 57'	Stadium: Stadio Moreno Gubbiotti; Referee: Andrea Collelli (Ostria

28 January 2026	Inter Milan (1)	4–0	Ternana (1)	Milan
18:00	Bugeja 2', 42'; Csiszár 77'; Magull 85'	Report		Stadium: Arena Civica; Referee: Davide Cerea (Bergamo)

Inter Milan won 6–0 on aggregate.

21 January 2026	Lazio (1)	0–0	Roma (1)	Formello
20:30		Report		Stadium: Centro Sportivo di Formello; Referee: Gerardo Simeone Caruso (Viterbo)

28 January 2026	Roma (1)	3–0	Lazio (1)	Rome
18:00	Corelli 6'; Viens 27', 28'	Report		Stadium: Stadio Tre Fontane; Referee: Leonardo Di Mario (Ciampino)

Roma won 3–0 on aggregate.

22 January 2026	Napoli (1)	1–2	Juventus (1)	Cercola
18:00	Fløe 46'	Report	Vangsgaard 17'; Girelli 88' (pen.)	Stadium: Stadio Giuseppe Piccolo; Referee: Stefano Striamo (Salerno)

29 January 2026	Juventus (1)	2–1	Napoli (1)	Biella
20:30	Girelli 68'; Thomas 79'	Report	Kozak 84'	Stadium: Stadio La Marmora-Pozzo; Referee: Felipe Salvatore Viapiana (Catanzaro)

== Semi-finals ==
Number of teams per tier still in competition
Serie A	Serie B	Total
4 / 12	0 / 14	4 / 26

Team 1	Agg.	Team 2	1st leg	2nd leg
Fiorentina	1–4	Juventus	0–2	1–2
Roma	3–2	Inter Milan	1–1	2–1

11 March 2026	Fiorentina	0–2	Juventus	Florence
18:00		Report	Beccari 9'; Capeta 51'	Stadium: Viola Park; Referee: Riccardo Dasso (Genoa)

29 March 2026	Juventus	2–1	Fiorentina	Turin
	Capeta 9', 52'	Report	Omarsdottir 63'	Stadium: Stadio Vittorio Pozzo; Referee: Giorgio Bozzetto

Juventus won 4–1 on aggregate.

12 March 2026	Roma	1–1	Inter Milan	Rome
18:00	Babajide 52'	Report	Wullaert 88' (pen.)	Stadium: Stadio Tre Fontane; Referee: Deborah Bianchi (Prato)

29 March 2026	Inter Milan	1–2	Roma	Milan
	Vilhjálmsdóttir 90'	Report	Giugliano 27'; Viens 39'	Stadium: Stadio Ernesto Breda; Referee: Filippo Colaninno

Roma won 3–2 on aggregate.

== Final ==
24 May 2026
18:00

Juventus	0–1	Roma
	Report	Giugliano 80'

Stadio Romeo Menti, Vicenza
Attendance: c. 6,000
Referee: Silvia Gasperotti

== Top goalscorers ==
As of 29 March 2026

Players and clubs in bold are still active in the competition.

Rank	Player	Club	Goals
1	(Canada) **Evelyne Viens**	**Roma**	5
2	(Malta) Haley Bugeja	Inter Milan	3
2	(Denmark) Cecilie Fløe	Napoli	3
2	(Sweden) Alice Söndergaard	Genoa	3
5	(Italy) **Michela Cambiaghi**	**Juventus**	2
5	(Italy) Alessia Carcassi	Napoli	2
5	(Italy) **Cristiana Girelli**	**Juventus**	2
5	(Poland) Kinga Kozak	Napoli	2
5	(Germany) **Paulina Krumbiegel**	**Juventus**	2
5	(Italy) Alessia Rognoni	Bologna	2
5	(Denmark) **Amalie Vangsgaard**	**Juventus**	2
5	(Belgium) Davinia Vanmechelen	Napoli	2
5	(Italy) Marta Zamboni	Cesena	2
