= Oihane =

Oihane is a female Basque given name. Notable people with the name include:

- Oihane Hernández (born 2000), Spanish footballer
- Oihane Otaegi (born 1977), Spanish curler
- Oihane Valdezate (born 2000), Spanish footballer
