= Agnete Marcussen =

Danish footballer

Personal information
- Date of birth: 22 September 1999 (age 27)
- Place of birth: Nibe, Denmark
- Height: 1.68 m (5 ft 6 in)
- Position: Defender

Team information
- Current team: Como
- Number: 2

Senior career*
Years	Team	Apps	(Gls)
2017–2022	FC Thy-Thisted Q	87	(1)
2022–2024	HB Køge	40	(0)
2024–	Como	8	(0)
- * Club domestic league appearances and goals

Agnete Marcussen (born 22 September 1999) is a Danish footballer who plays as a defender for Como in Serie A.

== Personal life ==
Marcussen has a twin sister Beate Marcussen who is also a footballer.

== Honours ==
FC Thy-Thisted Q

- Danish Women's Cup: 2021
