= Beate Marcussen =

Danish association football player

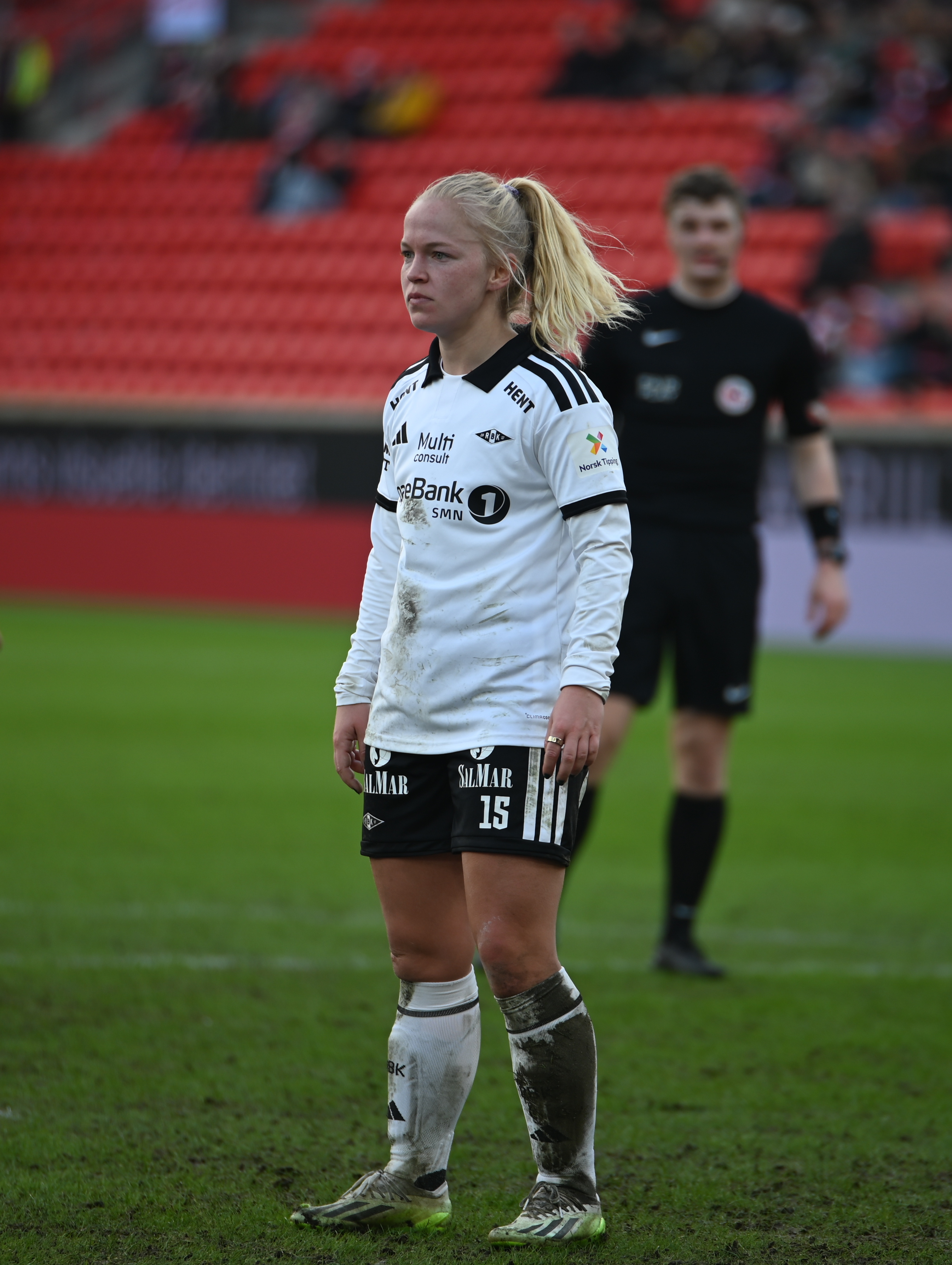
- Beate Marcussen in 2026

Personal information
- Date of birth: 22 September 1999 (age 27)
- Place of birth: Nibe, Denmark
- Height: 1.58 m (5 ft 2 in)
- Position: Central midfielder

Team information
- Current team: Rosenborg
- Number: 15

Senior career*
Years	Team	Apps	(Gls)
2016–	AaB		
2018–2022	FC Thy-Thisted Q	99	(16)
2022–2024	HB Køge	42	(9)
2024–	Rosenborg	63	(6)
- * Club domestic league appearances and goals as of June 2025

Beate Marcussen (born 22 September 1999) is a Danish footballer who plays as a Central midfielder for Toppserien club Rosenborg.

== Personal life ==
Marcussen has a twin sister Agnete Marcussen who is also a footballer.

== Honours ==
FC Thy-Thisted Q

- Danish Women's Cup: 2021
