= Kaylie Ronan =

American soccer player (born 2002)

Personal information
- Full name: Kaylie Joy Ronan
- Date of birth: September 9, 2002 (age 24)
- Place of birth: Carlsbad, California, U.S.
- Height: 5 ft 8 in (1.73 m)
- Position: Defender

Team information
- Current team: Como
- Number: 3

Youth career
- 2016–2021: San Diego Surf

College career
Years	Team	Apps	(Gls)
2021–2024	Notre Dame Fighting Irish	58	(2)

Senior career*
Years	Team	Apps	(Gls)
2025	Werder Bremen	11	(1)
2026–	Como	6	(0)
- * Club domestic league appearances and goals as of 05:00, September 29, 2026 (UTC)

Kaylie Joy "KJ" Ronan (born September 9, 2002) is an American professional soccer player who plays as a defender for Serie A club Como. She played college soccer for the Notre Dame Fighting Irish before starting her professional career with Frauen-Bundesliga club SV Werder Bremen.

== Early life ==
Ronan was born in Carlsbad, California. Her mother, Angela, played soccer collegiately for the Cal State Northridge Matadors. Ronan spent four years in Costa Rica as a child due to her father's job before the family moved back to Carlsbad. She started off playing for a variety of soccer clubs around San Diego County before joining the San Diego Surf in 2016. With the Surf, she contributed to an Elite Clubs National League quarterfinal finish in 2017 and a championship final appearance the following year. Ronan attended Carlsbad High School, where she played basketball and set the program record for career assists.

== College career ==
Ronan received a scholarship offer from the University of Notre Dame by her sophomore year of high school and signed her National Letter of Intent in November 2020. As a freshman with the Fighting Irish in 2021, she appeared in a career-high 21 games as a regular defensive substitute, including all 3 of the NCAA tournament. She helped Notre Dame's defensive unit allow less than one goal per game. On September 26, 2021, she scored her first collegiate goal in a 4–1 win over Boston College. The following season, Ronan operated both from the backline and as a midfielder, making her first career start in a victory over Western Michigan on August 21, 2022.

Ronan then went on to participate in 23 more matches over the next two years, totaling 58 appearances in her time with the Fighting Irish. As a senior, she strung together three consecutive starts near the end of the 2024 season as a replacement for the injured Abby Mills. She also scored her second-ever goal for Notre Dame in November 2024, helping the Fighting Irish beat Milwaukee in the NCAA tournament first round. Off the field, Ronan found success in the classroom, earning two Atlantic Coast Conference All-Academic team honors as a psychology major.

== Club career ==
=== Werder Bremen ===
On 5 February 2025, near the end of the winter transfer window, German Frauen-Bundesliga club SV Werder Bremen announced that they had signed Ronan to her first professional contract to bolster a defensive unit that had been depleted due to injuries and the loan departure of club veteran Michelle Ulbrich. Four days later, Ronan made her professional debut, starting in a 4–1 defeat to RB Leipzig. She quickly became a fixture on the Werder Bremen team sheet, starting in the DFB-Pokal quarterfinal, semifinal, and final loss to Bayern Munich. On 29 March 2025, she scored her first professional goal, a header against Eintracht Frankfurt.

Ahead of Ronan's second season at the club, Werder Bremen hired Friederike Kromp to replace departing head coach Thomas Horsch. Ronan had trouble finding playing time under the new management, recording only 4 Bundesliga appearances (all of which were as a substitute) and one cup appearance over the first half of the season. On 22 January 2026, she departed from Werder Bremen on a mutual contract termination. She had appeared 15 times for the club across all competitions.

=== Como ===
Ronan joined Italian club Como in February 2026, signing a contract through the end of the season with an option for an additional year. She made her Serie A debut on 21 February 2026, in a shutout victory over Genoa, and played in 5 more league games in her first season in Italy.

== Career statistics ==
=== Club ===
As of September 29, 2026

Appearances and goals by club, season and competition
Club	Season	League			Cup (Note: Includes the DFB-Pokal Frauen and the Serie A Women's Cup)		Total	
Club	Season	Division	Apps	Goals	Apps	Goals	Apps	Goals
SV Werder Bremen	2024–25	Frauen-Bundesliga	7	1	3	0	10	1
SV Werder Bremen	2025–26	Frauen-Bundesliga	4	0	1	0	4	0
SV Werder Bremen	Total		11	1	4	0	15	1
FC Como	2025–26	Serie A	6	0	0	0	6	0
FC Como	2026–27	Serie A	1	0	3	0	4	0
FC Como	Total		7	0	3	0	10	0
Career total			18	1	7	0	25	0
