= Valentina Soggiu =

Italian footballer (born 2003)

Personal information
- Date of birth: 1 January 2003 (age 23)
- Place of birth: Susa Valley
- Position: Goalkeeper

Team information
- Current team: AS Roma
- Number: 36

Youth career
- 2015–2022: Juventus

Senior career*
Years	Team	Apps	(Gls)
2020–2023	Juventus	0	(0)
2022–2023	→ Sampdoria (loan)	1	(0)
2023–	Roma	0	(0)
2023–2025	→ Chievo Verona (loan)	24	(0)
2025	→ Como (loan)	1	(0)

International career^{‡}
2019	Italy U16	2	(-3)
2019–2020	Italy U17	7	(?)
2021–	Italy U19	2	(-3)
2024	Italy U23	0	(0)
- * Club domestic league appearances and goals as of 4 September 2025 ‡ National team caps and goals as of 4 September 2025

Valentina Maria Soggiu (Italian: [valenˈtiːna maˈriːa ˈsɔddʒu]; born 1 January 2003) is an Italian professional footballer who plays as goalkeeper for Serie A club Roma. She has also represented her country in youth level.

== Club career ==
Valentina Soggiu came through the youth ranks at Juventus, where she was also promoted to the first team between 2020 and 2022, although she never made an appearance for the Bianconere.

In January 2022, she was loaned to Sampdoria, still in Serie A, where she played three matches (one in Serie A and two in the Coppa Italia), so debutting with a senior team.

In the summer of 2023, she moved to Roma, which immediately sent her on loan to ChievoVerona in Serie B. In Verona, she was the starting goalkeeper for the 2023–24 season and served as the backup goalkeeper during the first half of the 2024–25 season.

In January 2025, she joined Como Women on loan, and in the summer she returned to her parent club, AS Roma.

== International career ==
Valentina Soggiu has represented the Italian national team at U-16, U-17, U-19 and U-23 levels. In particular, she was the starting goalkeeper of the U-17 squad involved in the qualifying phase of the 2019 European Championship, where Soggiu played 3 out of 3 matches, keeping 3 clean sheets.

== Career statistics ==
=== Club ===
As of match played 29 March 2026

Appearances and goals by club, season and competition
Club	Season	League			National cup (Note: Includes Coppa Italia)		League cup (Note: Includes Coppa Femminile di Serie A)		Continental		Total	
Club	Season	Division	Apps	Goals	Apps	Goals	Apps	Goals	Apps	Goals	Apps	Goals
Juventus	2021–22	Serie A	0	0	0	0	—		—		0	0
Juventus	2022–23	Serie A	0	0	0	0	—		—		0	0
Juventus	Total		0	0	0	0	0	0	0	0	0	0
Sampdoria (loan)	2021–22	Serie A	1	0	2	0	—		—		3	0
Sampdoria (loan)	2022–23	Serie A	0	0	0	0	—		—		0	0
Sampdoria (loan)	Total		1	0	2	0	0	0	0	0	3	0
AS Roma	2023–24	Serie A	0	0	0	0	—		0	0	0	0
AS Roma	2025–26	Serie A	0	0	1	0	0	0	0	0	1	0
AS Roma	Total		0	0	1	0	0	0	0	0	1	0
Chievo Verona (loan)	2023–24	Serie B	21	0	0	0	—		—		21	0
Chievo Verona (loan)	2024–25	Serie B	3	0	1	0	—		—		4	0
Chievo Verona (loan)	Total		24	0	1	0	0	0	0	0	25	0
Como (loan)	2024–25	Serie A	1	0	0	0	—		0	0	3	0
Career total			26	0	4	0	0	0	0	0	30	0
