= Shukurat Oladipo =

Nigerian footballer

Personal information
- Full name: Shukurat Damilola Oladipo
- Date of birth: 22 September 2004 (age 22)
- Height: 1.60 m (5 ft 3 in)
- Position: Defender

Team information
- Current team: Roma
- Number: 19

Senior career*
Years	Team	Apps	(Gls)
–2025	Robo	178	(0)
2025–	Roma	19	(0)

International career^{‡}
2024–	Nigeria U20	4	(0)
2024–	Nigeria	15	(0)
- * Club domestic league appearances and goals as of 3 September 2026 ‡ National team caps and goals as of 5 September 2026

Shukurat Damilola Oladipo (Yoruba: [ʃùkúrát dàmílɔ́là óládípò] born 22 September 2004) is a Nigerian professional footballer who plays as a defender for Serie A club Roma and the Nigeria national team.

== Club career ==
Oladipo began her career at NWFL Premiership club FC Robo.

In 2025, Oladipo moved to Italy and signed a two year contract with Serie A club Roma. She made her debut for the club as a substitute in a 1–0 away win over Fiorentina on 10 May 2025, her only appearance in the 2024–25 season.

== International career ==
Oladipo was part of Nigeria's 24-player squad for the 2024 Women's Africa Cup of Nations in Morocco.

== Honours ==
Nigeria

- Women's Africa Cup of Nations: 2024

AS Roma

- Serie A: 2025–26
- Coppa Italia: 2025–26

Individual

- Serie A Best Defender: 2025–26
- Serie A Team of the Season: 2025–26
