= Nadine Nischler =

Italian footballer (born 2000)

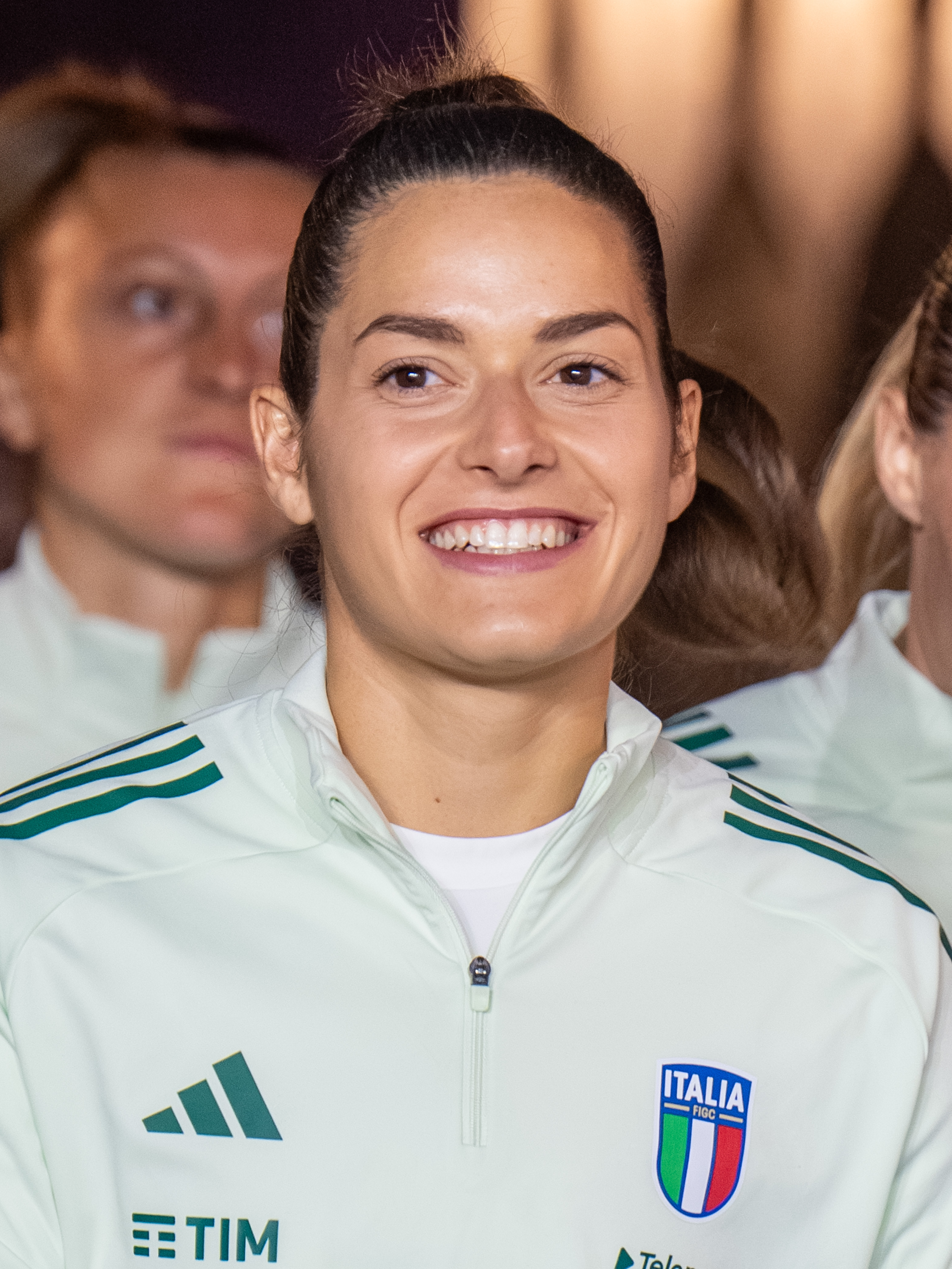
- Nischler with Italy in 2025

Personal information
- Date of birth: 8 November 2000 (age 25)
- Position: Midfielder

Team information
- Current team: Como
- Number: 7

Senior career*
Years	Team	Apps	(Gls)
2024–	Como	11	(6)

International career
2016–2017	Italy U17		
2017	Italy U19		
- * Club domestic league appearances and goals

Nadine Nischler (born 8 November 2000) is an Italian footballer who plays as a striker for the football club Como.
