= Ella Ottey =

Canadian association football player

Personal information
- Full name: Ella Grace Ottey
- Date of birth: August 12, 2005 (age 21)
- Place of birth: Toronto, Ontario, Canada
- Height: 1.70 m (5 ft 7 in)
- Position: Defender

Team information
- Current team: Roma
- Number: 12

Youth career
- Dixie SC
- Woodbridge Strikers
- NDC Ontario

College career
| Years | Team | Apps | (Gls) |
| 2023–2025 | Wisconsin Badgers | 59 | (1) |

Senior career*
| Years | Team | Apps | (Gls) |
| 2022–2024 | NDC Ontario | 22 | (2) |
| 2026– | Roma | 0 | (0) |

International career^{‡}
| 2021–2022 | Canada U17 | 11 | (0) |
| 2023–2024 | Canada U20 | 11 | (3) |
| 2025– | Canada | 2 | (0) |
- * Club domestic league appearances and goals as of July 28, 2026 ‡ National team caps and goals as of February 25, 2025

Ella Grace Ottey (born August 12, 2005) is a Canadian soccer player who plays for Roma in the Serie A and the Canada national team.

== Early life ==
Ottey began playing soccer at age four with Dixie SC. She later played with Woodbridge Strikers before joining the Canada Soccer NDC Ontario program.

== College career ==
In 2023, Ottey began attending the University of Wisconsin–Madison, where she played for the women's soccer team. She made her debut on August 17, 2023 against the Kansas Jayhawks. She scored her first collegiate goal on August 20, 2023 against the UIC Flames, which earned her Big Ten Conference Freshman of the Week honours. In 2024, she was named to the Big Ten All-Academic Team. In September 2025, she was named the Big Ten Defender of the Week. At the end of the 2025 season, she was named to the All-Big Ten Second Team and the Academic All-District team.

== Club career ==
In 2022, she played with NDC Ontario in League1 Ontario. She helped them capture the league title in 2022.

In July 2026, Ottey signed with Italian Serie A club Roma.

== International career ==
She made her debut in the Canada Soccer program in December 2021, attending a camp with the Canada U17 team. She was subsequently selected to the roster for the 2022 CONCACAF Women's U-17 Championship, where she won a bronze medal, and the 2022 FIFA U-17 Women's World Cup.

After her performance at the U17 World Cup, she was called up to the Canada senior team for the first time, at age 17, for friendlies against Brazil in November 2022. She earned her first senior cap on February 19, 2025 against China at the 2025 Pinatar Cup.

== Career statistics ==
As of August 4, 2024

| Club | Season | League | | | Playoffs | | Domestic Cup | | Other | | Total | |
| Club | Season | Division | Apps | Goals | Apps | Goals | Apps | Goals | Apps | Goals | Apps | Goals |
|---|---|---|---|---|---|---|---|---|---|---|---|---|
| NDC Ontario | 2022 | League1 Ontario | 11 | 0 | 0 | 0 | — | | — | | 11 | 0 |
| NDC Ontario | 2023 | League1 Ontario | 9 | 2 | 0 | 0 | — | | — | | 9 | 2 |
| NDC Ontario | 2024 | League1 Ontario | 2 | 0 | — | | — | | 0 | 0 | 2 | 0 |
| Career total | | | 22 | 2 | 0 | 0 | 0 | 0 | 0 | 0 | 22 | 2 |
