= Heden Corrado =

Italian footballer (born 2002)

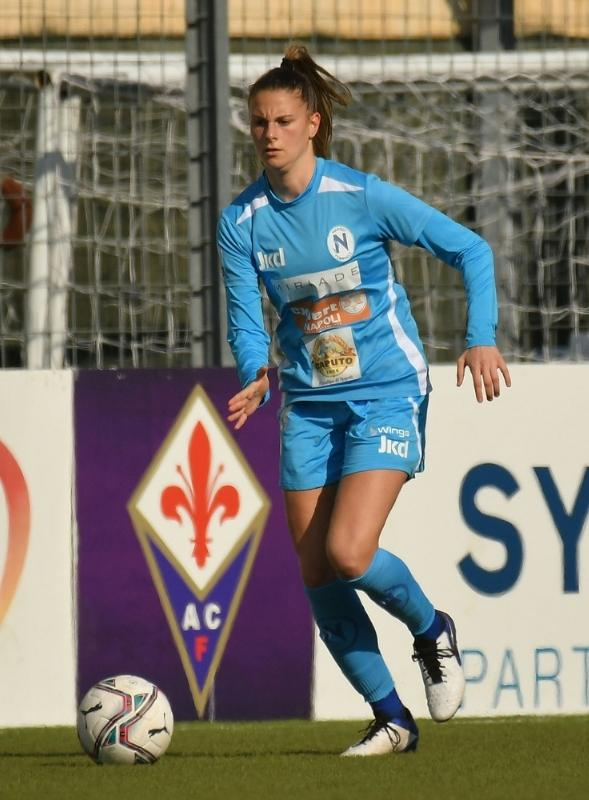

Personal information
- Date of birth: 5 March 2002 (age 24)
- Place of birth: Rome, Italy
- Position: Defender

Team information
- Current team: Ternana

Youth career
- Res Roma
- Roma

Senior career*
Years	Team	Apps	(Gls)
2018–2023	Roma	8	(0)
2021–2022	→ Napoli (loan)	11	(0)
2022–2023	→ ChievoVerona FM (loan)	23	(0)
2023–2024	→ Pomigliano (loan)	5	(0)
2024–	Ternana		

International career
2017	Italy U16	9	(0)
2017–2019	Italy U17	19	(0)
- * Club domestic league appearances and goals

Heden Corrado (born 5 March 2002) is an Italian footballer who plays as defender for Italian club Ternana. She graduated from Roma's youth teams and has represented her country at U-16 and U-17 level.

== Club career ==
Corrado originally trained as a midfielder at youth level before she was moved to the backline to become a ball-playing defender. The decision led to Corrado becoming a key player in Res Roma Primavera's consecutive league title wins. By the summer of 2018, Res Roma sold their Serie A license to newly-formed club A.S. Roma and transferred Corrado's playing rights to her new club.

Corrado began playing for A.S. Roma at senior level during the 2018–19 season, but she suffered a traumatic knee injury early in the season that put her out of action for a lengthy period.

Despite spending a year out recovering from major injury, Corrado was still named in the press as one of Italy's most promising talents in 2019. Corrado spent the latter half of 2019 making her comeback to pitch, and was trusted to wear the captain's armband at international level for the Italy U-17 team. Despite the faith shown in her by her country, she could not break into Roma's first team in Serie A from 2019 onwards. However, Corrado did play for Roma in the 2020–21 Coppa Italia success, which led to Corrado picking up a Coppa Italia winner's medal when Roma defeated AC Milan in the 30 May 2021 final.

On 15 July 2021, it was officially announced that Corrado moved on loan to Napoli for the 2021–2022 season.

== Style of play ==
Corrado is a ball-playing defender who is very comfortable carrying the ball out of the backline to help her team's build-up play. Her physical stature and strength help her to win aerial and physical duels against individual opponents.
