= Samantha van Diemen =

Dominican Republic footballer (b. 2002)

Personal information
- Date of birth: 28 January 2002 (age 24)
- Place of birth: Leiden, Netherlands
- Height: 1.70 m (5 ft 7 in)
- Position: Defender

Team information
- Current team: Inter Milan
- Number: 4

Youth career
- 2018: Ajax

Senior career*
Years	Team	Apps	(Gls)
2019–2021	Ajax	12	(1)
2021–2022	Feyenoord	23	(1)
2022–2024	Fortuna Sittard	37	(0)
2024–2025	Glasgow City	32	(3)
2025–2026	Roma	3	(0)
2026–	Inter Milan	0	(0)

International career^{‡}
2017	Netherlands U15	3	(1)
2018	Netherlands U16	7	(0)
2017–2019	Netherlands U17	16	(1)
2020	Netherlands U18	3	(1)
2019–2020	Netherlands U19	7	(1)
2022	Netherlands U20	8	(0)
2021–2023	Netherlands U23	10	(2)
2021–2022	Netherlands	3	(0)
2025–	Dominican Republic	1	(1)
- * Club domestic league appearances and goals as of 28 October 2025 ‡ National team caps and goals as of 29 May 2024

Samantha van Diemen (Dutch: [saˈman.tɑ vɑn ˈdi.mən]; born 28 January 2002) is a footballer who plays as defender for Serie A Femminile club Inter Milan and the Dominican Republic national team. Born in the Netherlands, which she represented at every international level, she pledged allegiance to the Dominican Republic in 2025.

== Club career ==
Van Diemen played for CTO, an educational team organized by the national football association KNVB. When CTO stopped in 2018, Van Diemen went to Ajax Talententeam, the female youth team of Ajax. In the summer of 2019 she signed a contract for the Ajax Vrouwen-squad. Van Diemen made her league debut against SC Heerenveen on 9 October 2020. She scored her first goal against ADO Den Haag on 28 March 2021, scoring in the 49th minute.

In July 2021 van Diemen signed a contract with Feyenoord to continue her career. She made her league debut against ADO Den Haag on 29 August 2021. Van Diemen scored her first league goal against Heerenveen on 12 November 2021, scoring in the 51st minute. On 7 June 2022, it was announced that van Diemen would be leaving Feyenoord.

Van Diemen made her league debut against Ajax on 16 September 2022. On May 31, 2023, it was announced that she had signed a new one-year deal.

=== Inter Milan ===
On 18 July 2026, van Diemen joined Serie A club Inter Milan on a three-year contract until 30 June 2029.

== International career ==
On 15 February 2018 Van Diemen played her first international game for Oranje U16. Van Diemen made her Oranje U17 debut against Lithuania U17s on 9 May 2018. She scored her first goal against Germany U17s on 8 May 2019, scoring in the 30th minute. Van Diemen scored on her Netherlands U18 debut against United States U18s on 31 January 2020, scoring in the 10th minute. She has also played for Oranje U19. Van Diemen made her Netherlands U20 debut against Mexico U20s on 22 June 2022. Since 2021, she plays for Oranje U23.

Van Diemen became the first ever female Feyenoord player to play for the Netherlands, when she started on 29 November 2021 in a 0–0 draw, during a friendly match against Japan.

On 9 May 2025, Van Diemen was called up to the Dominican Republic national team. She made her debut 20 days later, starting in a 2–4 away friendly win over Honduras and scoring the first goal of the match and her senior international career. On 2 December 2025, Van Diemen's request to switch international allegiance to the Dominican Republic was approved by FIFA.

== Personal life ==
Born in the Netherlands, Van Diemen also holds Dominican Republic citizenship as her mother is originally from there. She is studying a journalism course at NTI.

== Honours ==
Ajax

- Eredivisie (1): 2019–20

AS Roma

- Serie A (1): 2025–26
