= Frøya Dorsin =

Norwegian footballer (born 2007)

Personal information
- Full name: Frøya Brennskag-Dorsin
- Date of birth: 7 January 2007 (age 19)
- Place of birth: Trondheim, Norway
- Height: 1.69 m (5 ft 7 in)
- Position: Forward

Team information
- Current team: Benfica (on loan from Paris Saint-Germain)

Youth career
- 2019–2021: IL Trond
- 2022–2023: Rosenborg

Senior career*
| Years | Team | Apps | (Gls) |
| 2022–2023 | Rosenborg 2 | 20 | (12) |
| 2022–2024 | Rosenborg | 28 | (5) |
| 2024– | Paris Saint-Germain | 14 | (2) |
| 2026 | → Roma (loan) | 11 | (2) |
| 2026– | → Benfica (loan) | 0 | (0) |

International career^{‡}
| 2022 | Norway U15 | 4 | (0) |
| 2022–2023 | Norway U16 | 8 | (9) |
| 2023–2024 | Norway U17 | 10 | (2) |
| 2024–2025 | Norway U19 | 12 | (3) |
| 2025– | Norway U23 | 7 | (0) |
- * Club domestic league appearances and goals as of 30 June 2026 ‡ National team caps and goals as of 5 June 2026

Frøya Brennskag-Dorsin (born 7 January 2007) is a Norwegian professional footballer who plays as a forward for Campeonato Nacional Feminino club Benfica, on loan from Première Ligue club Paris Saint-Germain.

== Early life ==
Dorsin was born on 7 January 2007 in Norway. The daughter of Sweden international Mikael Dorsin, she has a younger brother. Growing up, she played handball before choosing to focus on football.

== Club career ==
As a youth player, Dorsin joined the academy of Norwegian side Rosenborg, where she started her senior career. Altogether, she made 28 league appearances and scored five goals while playing for the club.

On 20 September 2024, Dorsin joined French club Paris Saint-Germain on a three-year deal. She scored her first goal for the club on 9 November 2024 in a 4–0 league win against Strasbourg.

In January 2026, Dorsin signed Italian club AS Roma until the end of the season. She scored twice across 12 league matches in her six-month Serie A stint. Roma opted not to acquire Dorsin permanently at the end of her loan.

After her spell at Roma ended, Dorsin was sent out on loan once again, this time to Campeonato Nacional Feminino club Benfica through the 2026–27 season.

== International career ==
Dorsin played for the Norway women's national under-17 football team for 2023 UEFA Women's Under-17 Championship qualification and 2024 UEFA Women's Under-17 Championship qualification and captained the team. In 2024, she started playing for the Norway women's national under-19 football team.
