= Oihane Valdezate =

Spanish footballer (born 2000)

- Valdezate with the Chicago Stars in 2026

Personal information
- Full name: Oihane Valdezate Cabornero
- Date of birth: 10 April 2000 (age 26)
- Place of birth: Trapagaran, Spain
- Height: 1.80 m (5 ft 11 in)
- Positions: Centre-back; midfielder

Team information
- Current team: Chicago Stars
- Number: 6

Youth career
- 2010–2015: Pauldarrak

Senior career*
Years	Team	Apps	(Gls)
2015–2016	Pauldarrak		
2016–2019	Athletic Club B	73	(13)
2019–2023	Athletic Club	114	(6)
2023–2026	Roma	22	(1)
2026–	Chicago Stars	0	(0)

International career^{‡}
2018	Spain U19	2	(0)
2021–	Spain U23	14	(1)
- * Club domestic league appearances and goals as of 05:34, 2 November 2026 (UTC) ‡ National team caps and goals as of 06:17, 22 December 2023 (UTC)

Oihane Valdezate Cabornero (Basque: [oi̯ˈʃane], Spanish: [baldeˈθate kaβorˈneɾo]; born 10 April 2000) is a Spanish professional footballer who plays as a centre-back for Chicago Stars FC of the National Women's Soccer League (NWSL). She began her senior career in her homeland with Athletic Club before moving to Italian club Roma in 2023.

== Club career ==
Valdezate started her career in the youth system at Pauldarrak (Barakaldo). She joined Athletic Club in 2016 and made her debut for the first team on 13 April 2019, a 1–0 victory against Albacete. In April 2020, she signed a contract extension with Athletic Club, keeping her at the club until 2023. In the 2020–21 season, Valdezate was deployed in a number of different positions, including forward and central defender. Her usual position is midfielder.

Valdezate departed Athletic in 2023 upon the expiry of her contract, moving to Italy to join reigning Serie A champions Roma on a three-year contract. She spent her first and third seasons there as a squad member, with 11 appearances in the league in each campaign (Roma claiming the title in both) plus a handful more in cups; she came off the bench in the 2024 Coppa Italia final victory over Fiorentina but was an unused substitute in the 2026 final win over Juventus. In the second season she had no competitive involvement at all after tearing the anterior cruciate ligament of her right knee in August 2024, which required surgery and lengthy rehabilitation.

On 10 August 2026, it was announced that Valdezate had signed with the National Women's Soccer League (NWSL)'s Chicago Stars FC through the end of the season.

== International career ==
Valdezate made her debut for the Spain under-23 team (which only plays friendlies) in November 2021 against Norway and was soon a mainstay of the squad, with 14 appearances from a possible 15 by the end of 2023.
