= Wini Heatley =

Australian soccer player

Personal information
- Full name: Winonah Grace Heatley
- Date of birth: 18 June 2001 (age 25)
- Place of birth: Cairns, Queensland, Australia
- Height: 1.78 m (5 ft 10 in)
- Positions: Defender; midfielder

Team information
- Current team: Roma
- Number: 6

Youth career
- Douglas United
- Northern Tigers

Senior career*
Years	Team	Apps	(Gls)
2019–2021	Brisbane Roar	16	(1)
2021	Växjö DFF	3	(0)
2021–2022	Melbourne City	15	(1)
2022–2025	Nordsjælland	61	(3)
2025–	Roma	14	(0)

International career^{‡}
2017	Australia U17	2	(0)
2019	Australia U20	1	(0)
2022–	Australia U23	3	(1)
2021–	Australia	23	(0)
- * Club domestic league appearances and goals as of 23 October 2026 ‡ National team caps and goals as of 10 October 2026

Winonah Grace Heatley (/wɪˈnoʊnə/ win-OH-nə; born 18 June 2001) is an Australian professional soccer player who plays as a defender or defensive midfielder for Serie A Femminile club AS Roma and for the Australia national team. She has previously played for Brisbane Roar in the A-League Women, for Växjö DFF in the Damallsvenskan and for FC Nordsjælland in the A-Liga.

== Early life ==
Heatley was born in 2001 in Cairns, Queensland. She grew up in nearby Port Douglas, where she played for Douglas Dragons F.C. and Marlin Coast Rangers F.C. as a junior before moving to Brisbane at the age of 15 to pursue a career in football.

== Club career ==
On 16 February 2020, Heatley made her professional debut for the W-League (later known as A-League Women) team Brisbane Roar, in a match against Perth Glory. She entered the game as a half-time substitute. Heatley became a part of the side in the 2020–21 W-League season, where she made 13 appearances and scored 1 goal in a total of 1151 minutes.

In July 2021, Heatley transferred to Swedish side, Växjö DFF. She made her Damallsvenskan debut on 20 August 2021, playing the full 90 minutes against Vittsjö GIK in a 0–0 draw.

In November 2021, Heatley returned to Australia, signing with A-League Women club Melbourne City scoring 1 goal from 15 appearances. The defender reflected, "Melbourne City is the right thing for me right now, but it's also important to get more experience playing in unfamiliar environments and challenging myself in that way... My next step is definitely to head back overseas." Overall, she played 31 games during her A-League stints for two goals.

In June 2022, after one season in Australia, Heatley joined Danish club Nordsjælland. She was named co-captain ahead of the 2023–24 season. After 79 appearances that saw her part of two cup titles wins, and winning the Danish championship, Heatley announced her departure from Nordsjælland.

On 9 July 2025, it was announced that Heatley had joined AS Roma on a three-year contract.

== International career ==
In September 2021, after strong form with Swedish club side, Växjö DFF, Heatley earned her first senior Australia call-up for the friendly match against the Republic of Ireland on 21 September. She was called up again in 2022 and 2024. Heatley was substituted on for the Matildas in a pre-Olympic Games "B" international game against Canada in mid-July 2024, for which goals and appearances do not count towards official records. Heatley made her debut for the Australia senior national team on 28 October in Duisburg, Germany during an international friendly match against Germany, which the Matildas won.

== Career statistics ==
=== Club ===
As of 24 October 2025

Club	Season	League			National cup (Note: Includes the Svenska Cupen Dam, Danish Cup and Coppa Italia Femminile)		League cup (Note: Includes the Serie A Women's Cup)		Continental (Note: Includes the UEFA Women's Champions League (UWCL))		Total	
Club	Season	Division	Apps	Goals	Apps	Goals	Apps	Goals	Apps	Goals	Apps	Goals
Brisbane Roar	2019–20	A-League Women	3	0	—		—		—		3	0
Brisbane Roar	2020–21	A-League Women	13	1	—		—		—		13	1
Brisbane Roar	Total		16	1	—		—		—		16	1
Växjö DFF	2021	Damallsvenskan	3	0	1	0	—		—		4	0
Melbourne City FC	2021–22	A-League Women	15	1	—		—		—		15	1
FC Nordsjælland	2022–23	A-Liga	17	0	—		—		—		17	0
FC Nordsjælland	2023–24	A-Liga	20	1	—		—		—		20	1
FC Nordsjælland	2024–25	A-Liga	24	2	—		—		—		24	2
FC Nordsjælland	Total		61	3	—		—		—		61	3
Roma	2025–26	Serie A Femminile	11	0	4	0	4	0	4	0	23	0
Career total			106	5	5	0	4	0	4	0	119	5
