= Norma Cinotti =

Italian footballer

Personal information
- Date of birth: 11 September 1996 (age 30)
- Place of birth: Bagno a Ripoli, Italy
- Height: 1.70 m (5 ft 7 in)
- Position: Midfielder

Team information
- Current team: Genoa CFC

Senior career*
Years	Team	Apps	(Gls)
2013–2015	Firenze	18+	(1+)
2015–2018	Empoli	41	(15)
2018	ASPTT Albi	11	(0)
2019	Anderlecht	5	(1)
2019–2022	Empoli	58	(12)
2022–2023	Roma	19	(2)
2023–2024	→ Fiorentina	13	(1)
2024–2025	UC Sampdoria	9	(0)

International career
2021–	Italy	1	(0)
- * Club domestic league appearances and goals as of 10 September 2022

Norma Cinotti (born 11 September 1996) is an Italian professional footballer who plays as a midfielder for Genoa CFC and the Italy women's national team.

== Club career ==
Cinotti started her career with Italian top flight side Firenze, where she suffered relegation to the Italian second tier. In 2015, she signed for Empoli in the Italian second tier. In 2018, Cinotti signed for French second tier club ASPTT Albi.

Before the second half of 2018–19, Cinotti signed for Anderlecht in the Belgian top flight, helping them win the league. In 2019, she returned to Italian top flight team Empoli.

== Honours ==
AS Roma

- Serie A: 2022–23
