= Marta Pandini =

Italian footballer (born 1998)

Personal information
- Full name: Marta Teresa Pandini
- Date of birth: 21 March 1998 (age 28)
- Place of birth: Italy
- Height: 1.72 m (5 ft 7 1/2 in)
- Position: Midfielder

Team information
- Current team: AS Roma
- Number: 22

Senior career*
Years	Team	Apps	(Gls)
2014–2018	Inter Milano	68	(22)
2018–2024	Inter Milan	104	(16)
2024–	AS Roma	4	(1)

International career
2019	Italy U23	1	(0)
- * Club domestic league appearances and goals

Marta Teresa Pandini (Italian: [ˈmar.ta teˈre.za panˈdi.ni]; born 21 March 1998) is an Italian professional footballer who plays as a midfielder for AS Roma.

== Honours ==
Roma

- Coppa Italia: 2025–26
