= Valeria Pirone =

Italian footballer (born 1988)

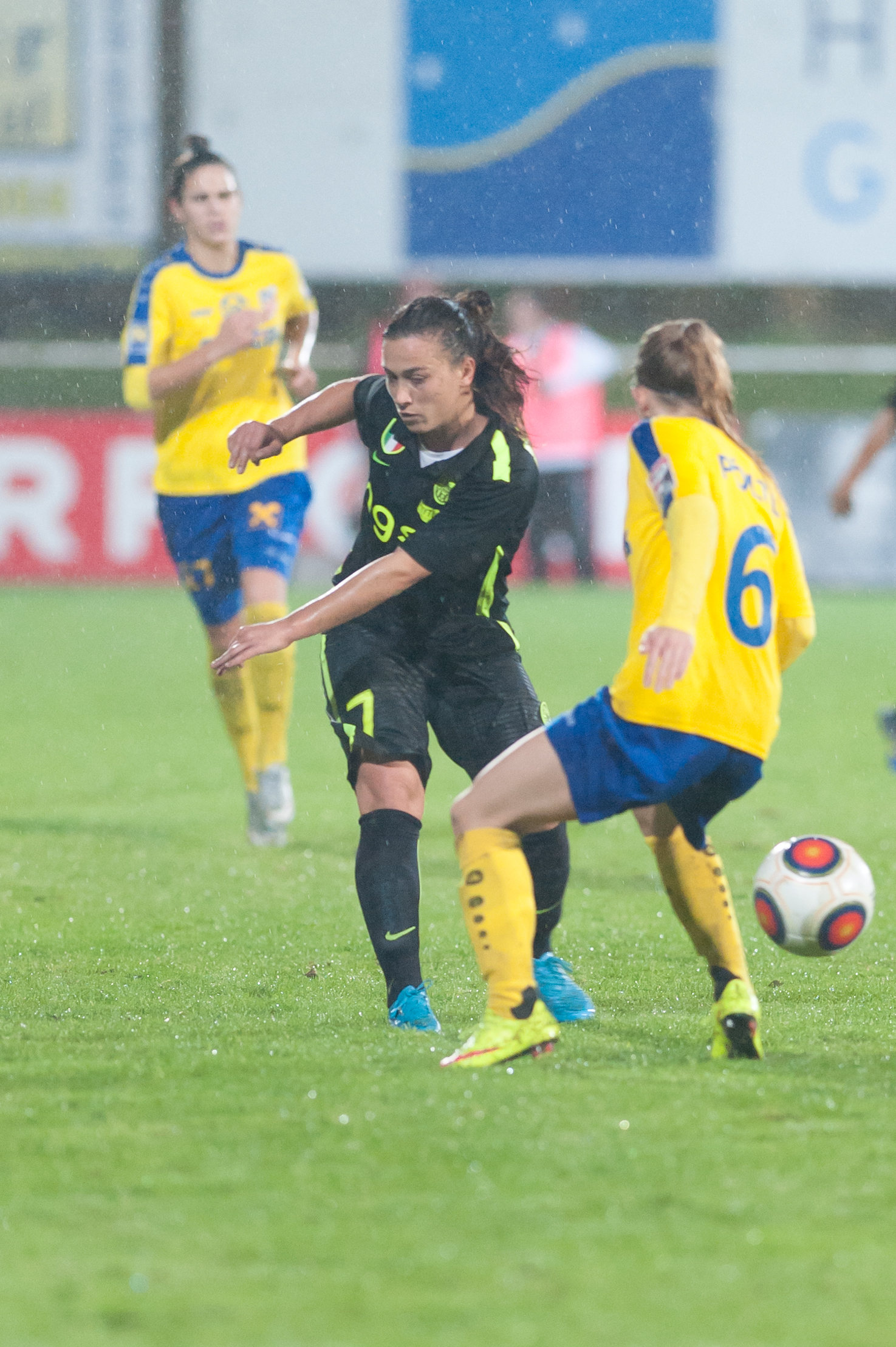
- Pirone playing for Verona in 2015

Personal information
- Date of birth: 3 December 1988 (age 37)
- Place of birth: Torre del Greco, Italy
- Position: Forward

Team information
- Current team: Ternana
- Number: 11

Senior career*
Years	Team	Apps	(Gls)
2005–2006	CF Agliana		
2006–2014	Napoli		
2014–2015	Res Roma	23	(10)
2015–2016	Verona	19	(11)
2016–2018	Atalanta	44	(28)
2018–2019	Chievo Verona	22	(7)
2019–2020	Hellas Verona	16	(2)
2020–2021	Sassuolo	22	(10)
2021–2022	Roma	17	(8)
2022–2023	Parma	10	(0)
2023–	Ternana		

International career^{‡}
2011–2021	Italy	7	(3)
- * Club domestic league appearances and goals as of 28 August 2022 ‡ National team caps and goals as of 21:06, 20 July 2021 (UTC)

Valeria Pirone (born 3 December 1988) is an Italian professional footballer who plays as a forward for Serie A Femminile club Ternana. She previously represented the Italy national team.

== International career ==
Pirone made her debut for the Italy national team on 26 October 2011 against Russia, coming on as a substitute in place of Daniela Sabatino.
