= Rachele Baldi =

Italian footballer (born 1994)

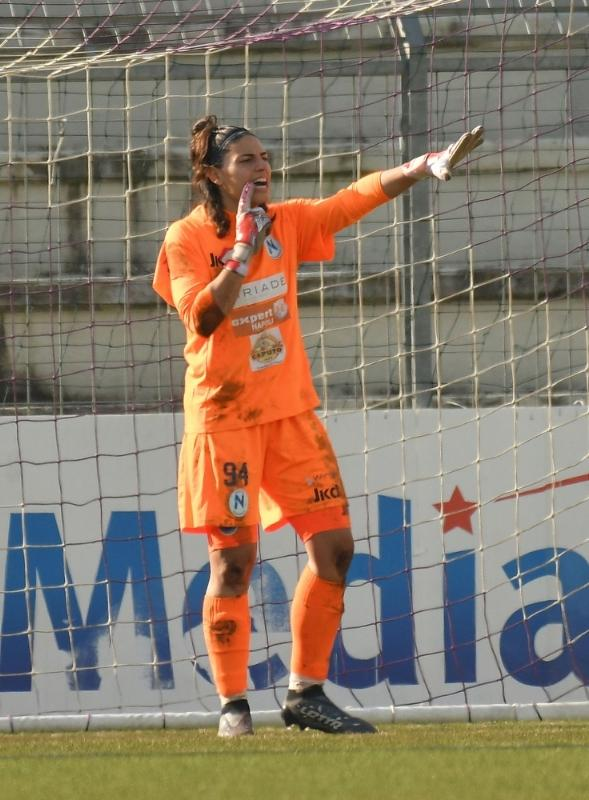
- Baldi with Napoli in 2022

Personal information
- Date of birth: 2 October 1994 (age 32)
- Place of birth: Prato, Italy
- Height: 1.75 m (5 ft 9 in)
- Position: Goalkeeper

Team information
- Current team: Roma
- Number: 24

Senior career*
Years	Team	Apps	(Gls)
2011–2012	Siena	10	(0)
2012–2016	Castelfranco	81	(0)
2016–2018	Empoli	33	(0)
2018–2019	Florentia	11	(0)
2019–2020	Empoli	13	(0)
2020–2022	Roma	9	(0)
2022	→ Napoli (loan)	7	(0)
2022–2024	Fiorentina	24	(0)
2024–2025	→ Inter Milan (loan)	3	(0)
2025–	Roma	8	(0)

International career^{‡}
2023–	Italy	1	(0)
- * Club domestic league appearances and goals as of 03:25, 15 December 2025 (UTC) ‡ National team caps and goals as of 18 July 2024

Rachele Baldi (Italian: [raˈkɛːle ˈbaldi]; born 2 October 1994) is an Italian professional footballer who plays as a goalkeeper for Serie A club Roma and the Italy national team.

== Club career ==
Baldi spent the first 9 years of her senior football career playing within her home region of Tuscany, among various clubs in the area. She openly wrote on her emotional ties to Empoli when she decided to leave Tuscany in 2020. After speculating on moving to play football abroad in a foreign league, Baldi decided to stay in Italy and move to Roma.

During Baldi's first season with Roma, she struggled to impose herself as a first-team regular at the club. Baldi made just 9 league appearances in the 2020–21 Serie A season, keeping an 11.1% clean sheet percentage in the league.

On 30 May 2021, Baldi received a Coppa Italia winner's medal after Roma won the trophy by beating AC Milan in the final.

== International career ==
On 25 June 2025, Baldi was called up to the Italy squad for the UEFA Women's Euro 2025.
