= Maya Antoine =

Canadian soccer player (born 2001)

Personal information
- Full name: Maya Aliyah Antoine
- Date of birth: August 8, 2001 (age 25)
- Place of birth: Toronto, Ontario, Canada
- Height: 1.74 m (5 ft 9 in)
- Position: Center back

Team information
- Current team: AS Roma
- Number: 5

Youth career
- Vaughan SC
- Ontario Super REX

College career
Years	Team	Apps	(Gls)
2019–2023	Vanderbilt Commodores	83	(0)

Senior career*
Years	Team	Apps	(Gls)
2024–2025	IFK Norrköping	49	(0)
2026–	AS Roma	6	(0)

International career^{‡}
2016	Canada U15		
2018	Canada U17	10	(0)
2018–2019	Canada U20	5	(0)
- * Club domestic league appearances and goals as of January 2, 2026 ‡ National team caps and goals as of June 13, 2026

Maya Aliyah Antoine (born August 8, 2001) is a Canadian professional soccer player who plays as a center back for Italian Serie A club AS Roma. She played college soccer for the Vanderbilt Commodores before starting her professional career for IFK Norrköping in the Swedish Damallsvenskan. She has represented Canada at various youth levels.

== Early life ==
Antoine was born in Toronto, Ontario, to parents Gerard Antoine and Jennifer Munro-Antoine. She grew up in the nearby city of Vaughan, where she attended the local high school. Antoine played youth soccer for Vaughan SC and the Ontario Super REX program.

== College career ==
In 2019, Antoine moved to the United States and began playing college soccer with the Vanderbilt Commodores. She played in 10 games as a freshman before going down with an injury that also kept her out of international action. Antoine returned to the field in September 2020 and made her first collegiate start on September 27, in a game against Tennessee. She soon became a mainstay on the Commodores squad and started every single match for the next three seasons, including in Vanderbilt's 2022 NCAA Tournament campaign.

Antoine was able to play a fifth year in 2023, taking advantage of her extra season of NCAA eligibility from the COVID-19 pandemic. She played the season as a team captain and was named to the 2023 Mac Hermann Trophy watchlist. Antoine finished her college career with one SEC first team and two second team honors. She also was named to the All-Region first team and third team in separate years.

== Club career ==
=== IFK Norrköping ===
Antoine was not selected in the 2024 NWSL Draft. Instead, she trained with the Washington Spirit as a preseason trialist, but did not make the team's final roster. On March 11, 2024, Antoine signed her first professional contract with Swedish club IFK Norrköping, inking a one-year deal. She made her Damallsvenskan debut against KIF Örebro DFF in the 6th week of the season. Despite enduring a rocky start, Antoine was able to snag a starting position in Norrköping's squad and made 13 straight starts as a first-year professional. On August 5, 2025, Antoine earned a one-year extension with the club.

In her second season with Norrköping, Antoine cemented herself as a core piece of the team. She was the only player in the Damallsvenskan to play every minute of the league, reaching 2,340 minutes across all 26 of Norrköping's matches. She helped the team finish the 2025 Damallsvenskan in fifth place for the second straight year.

=== AS Roma ===
On January 15, 2026, Antoine was announced to have signed with Italian Serie A club AS Roma through the summer of 2028.

== International career ==
=== Youth ===
Antoine made her youth debut for Canada at the age of fourteen, winning a silver medal at the 2016 CONCACAF Girls' U-15 Championship. She has since gone on to play at multiple other youth levels, including as a member of the under-17 and under-20 squads.

In 2018, Antoine was named to Canada's squad for the 2018 FIFA U-17 Women's World Cup. During her team's semifinal match against Mexico, Antoine conceded a penalty kick after turning over the ball. Mexican midfielder Nicole Pérez converted the spot-kick, resulting in Canada losing the match, 1–0. Antoine participated in the team's bronze medal game, in which they were defeated, 2–1, by New Zealand.

During the same year, Antoine was part of the under-20 squad that reached fourth place in the 2018 CONCACAF Women's U-20 Championship. She was again called into U20 training camp in 2019 in preparation for the 2020 FIFA U-20 Women's World Cup. The U-20 world cup was later cancelled due to the COVID-19 pandemic, but Antoine's possible participation had appeared dubious anyway due to an injury sustained in college play.

=== Senior ===
Antoine received her first call-up to the Canadian senior team in August 2018 for a match versus Brazil the following month. She was included on the bench during the match but was not called on to make an appearance.

== Career statistics ==
=== Club ===
As of January 2, 2026

Appearances and goals by club, season and competition
Club	Season	League			Cup (Note: Includes the Svenska Cupen)		Other		Total	
Club	Season	Division	Apps	Goals	Apps	Goals	Apps	Goals	Apps	Goals
IFK Norrköping	2024	Damallsvenskan	23	0	1	0	—		24	0
IFK Norrköping	2025	Damallsvenskan	26	0	3	0	—		6	0
Career total			26	0	4	0	0	0	30	0
