= Olivie Lukášová =

Czech footballer (born 2001)

Personal information
- Date of birth: 23 June 2001 (age 25)
- Place of birth: Czech Republic
- Position: Goalkeeper

Team information
- Current team: Roma
- Number: 1

Senior career*
Years	Team	Apps	(Gls)
–2018	Slovácko		
2018–2024	Slavia		
2024–	Roma	0	(0)

International career^{‡}
2017	Czech Republic U17	3	(0)
2019–2020	Czech Republic U19	7	(0)
2022–	Czech Republic	20	(0)
- * Club domestic league appearances and goals as of 11 December 2024 ‡ National team caps and goals as of 11 December 2024

Olivie Lukášová (Czech: [ˈolɪvɪjɛ ˈlukaːʃovaː]; born 23 June 2001) is a Czech footballer who plays as a goalkeeper for Roma.

== Career ==
A native of Vsetín, Czech Republic, Lukášová started her career with Czech side Slovácko. In 2018, she signed for Czech side Slavia, where she played in the UEFA Women's Champions League and helped the club win the league title. Six years later, she signed for Italian side Roma.

== Style of play ==
Lukášová plays as a goalkeeper. Standing at 1.81m tall, she is known for her height and reflexes.
