= Giulia Galli (footballer) =

Italian footballer (born 2008)

Personal information
- Date of birth: 23 March 2008 (age 18)
- Place of birth: Rome, Italy
- Height: 1.77 m (5 ft 10 in)
- Position: Forward

Team information
- Current team: Barcelona
- Number: 45

Youth career
- 2017–2026: Roma

Senior career*
Years	Team	Apps	(Gls)
2024–2026	Roma	3	(0)
2026–	Barcelona	0	(0)

International career^{‡}
2022–2023	Italy U16	5	(2)
2023–2026	Italy U17	27	(18)
2026–	Italy U20	0	(0)
- * Club domestic league appearances and goals as of 28 September 2026 ‡ National team caps and goals as of 28 September 2026

Giulia Galli (born 23 March 2008) is an Italian professional footballer who plays as a forward for Liga F club Barcelona and the Italy women's national under-20 football team.

== Early life and education ==
Giulia Galli was born on 23 March 2008 in Rome, Italy. She grew up in the capital and in the nearby coastal town of Ostia, where she spent much of her time during the summer. A lifelong supporter of AS Roma, Galli began playing football at a young age with her father and brother.

During her school years, she also took part in student track and field competitions, competing in the 100 metres and 1000 metres, where she demonstrated notable speed and athletic ability.

== Club career ==
Galli started playing football at the age of six in a boys' youth team. She played there for three years before joining the AS Roma youth academy in 2017.

After spending the 2023-24 season with Roma's under-19 team, she made her professional debut for the first team on 1 May 2024 in a Serie A match against Sassuolo, becoming the youngest player ever to appear in a Serie A match for the Giallorosse at 16 years, 1 month and 8 days.

On 5 September 2026, Galli was announced to have been acquired Spanish powerhouse Barcelona via transfer and signed to a four-year contract until 2030.

== International career ==
Galli made her international debut for the Italy under-16 team at a Development Tournament in February 2023, where she played three matches and scored one goal against Germany.

In October 2023, she made her debut for the Italy under-17 team, scoring in her first match — a 4–3 loss against France — during the qualifiers for the 2024 UEFA Women's Under-17 Championship.

In May 2025, Galli took part in the final tournament of the 2025 UEFA Women's Under-17 Championship, scoring three goals in two matches — one against Poland and a brace against Spain. With her goals, Italy reached the European semifinals for the first time since the 2014 tournament. Although Italy were defeated by Norway in the semifinals, Galli and her teammates secured qualification for the Under-17 World Cup.
