= Noemi Visentin =

Italian footballer

Personal information
- Date of birth: 5 May 2000 (age 26)
- Place of birth: Rome, Italy
- Positions: Forward; midfielder

Team information
- Current team: Lazio
- Number: 99

Senior career*
Years	Team	Apps	(Gls)
2014–2015	Lazio		
2015–2020	Roma CF		
2020–	Lazio		

International career
2023	Italy U23	3	(2)
2026–	Italy	0	(0)
- * Club domestic league appearances and goals as of 29 August 2026

Noemi Visentin (Italian: [noˈɛːmi vizenˈtiːn]; born 5 May 2000) is an Italian footballer who plays as a striker or central midfielder for Serie A Women club Lazio. She previously played for Serie A Femminile club Roma CF.
