= Annalena Rieke =

German footballer (born 1999)

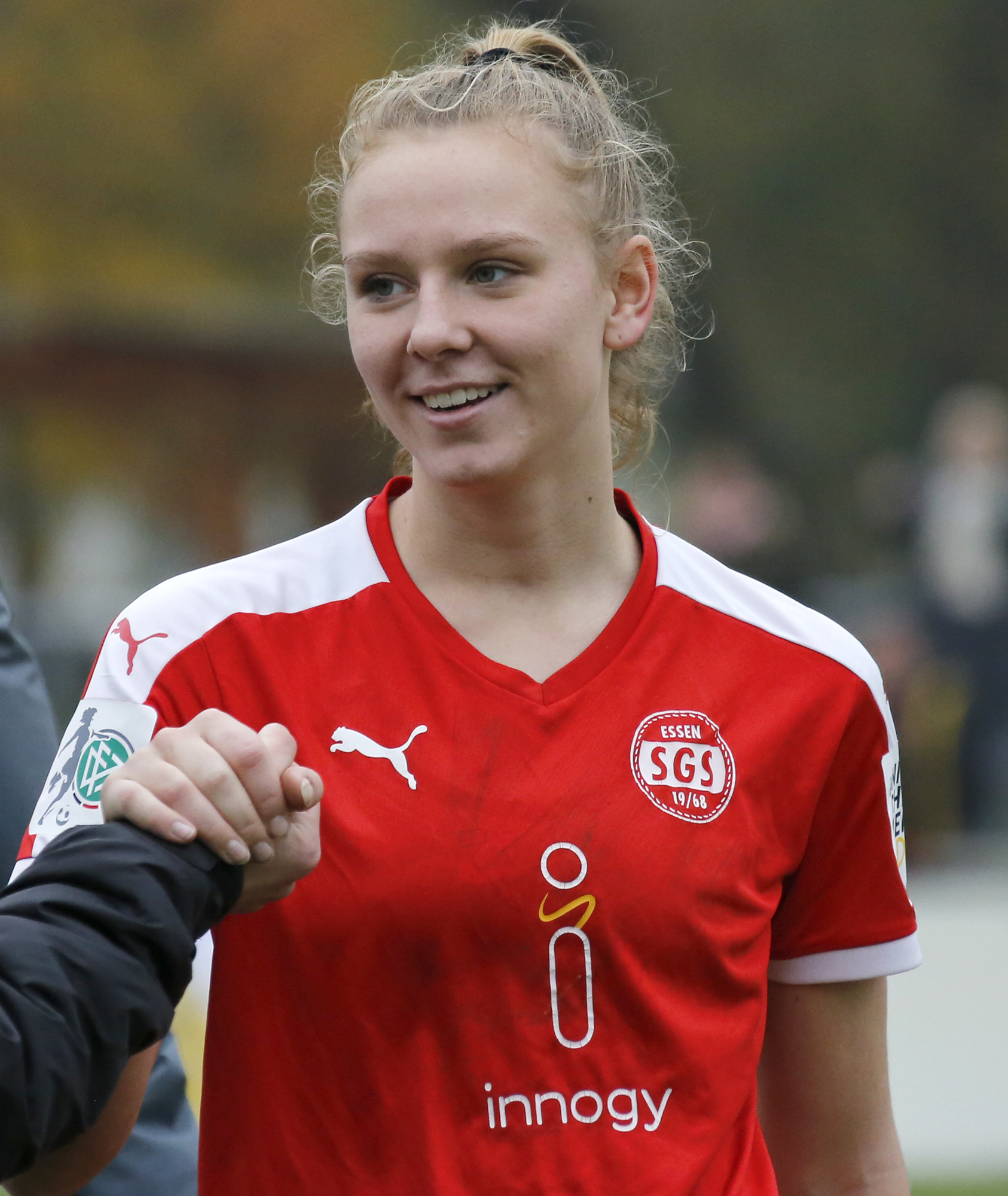
- Rieke in 2018

Personal information
- Date of birth: 10 January 1999 (age 27)
- Place of birth: Steinbeck, North Rhine-Westphalia, Germany
- Height: 1.72 m (5 ft 8 in)
- Position: Midfielder

Team information
- Current team: AS Roma
- Number: 29

Senior career*
Years	Team	Apps	(Gls)
2015–2016	FSV Gütersloh 2009	11	(0)
2016–2018	USV Jena	10	(1)
2018	USV Jena II	1	(0)
2018–2019	SGS Essen	0	(0)
2018–2019	SGS Essen II	7	(2)
2019–2022	FSV Gütersloh 2009	48	(31)
2022–2025	SGS Essen	58	(9)
2025–2029	AS Roma	2	(0)

International career
2016	Germany U17	10	(1)
2017	Germany U19	7	(2)
2017–2018	Germany U20	5	(0)
- * Club domestic league appearances and goals as of 04:07, 27 October 2025 (UTC)

Annalena Rieke (German: [ˌʔanaˈleːna ˈʁiːkə]; born 10 January 1999) is a German footballer who plays as a midfielder for AS Roma.

== International career ==
Rieke has represented Germany at youth level.
