= Alice Corelli =

Italian footballer (born 2003)

Personal information
- Date of birth: 28 November 2003 (age 22)
- Place of birth: Rome, Italy
- Height: 1.73 m (5 ft 8 in)
- Position: Forward

Team information
- Current team: Roma
- Number: 16

Youth career
- Roma

Senior career*
Years	Team	Apps	(Gls)
2020–	Roma	53	(7)
2022–2023	→ Pomigliano (loan)	22	(4)
2023–2024	→ Napoli (loan)	23	(2)

International career^{‡}
2019	Italy U16	6	(0)
2019	Italy U17	3	(0)
2021–2022	Italy U19	8	(2)
2022–	Italy U23	13	(3)
2025–	Italy	2	(0)
- * Club domestic league appearances and goals as of 10 May 2026 ‡ National team caps and goals as of 1 December 2025

Alice Corelli (Italian: [aˈliːtʃe koˈrɛlli]; born 28 November 2003) is an Italian professional footballer who plays as a forward for Serie A club AS Roma and the Italy women's national team.

== Club career ==
Corelli first took an interest in football after watching her brother play in their family household. Several years later, Alice Corelli emerged as a goalscorer from within A.S. Roma's Primavera youth ranks from 2018 to 2020. During the 2018–19 Primavera season, Corelli formed a prolific strike partnership with Chiara Manca that saw Corelli score 15 goals in 17 games. Corelli finished that season as the Primavera league's joint top scorer along with her teammate Manca. Corelli then forged a new strike partnership with new Roma Primavera striker Serena Landa for the 2019–20 season, which saw Corelli score 19 goals in 13 appearances during the regular season.

Though her regular season was cut short by an ankle injury in 2020, a global pandemic led to the Primavera league being suspended until September. Corelli recovered from injury in time to score in the Primavera league final against Juventus Primavera on 19 September 2020. Corelli scored the opening goal within three minutes of kick-off as her Roma side went on beat Juventus 2–1 and becoming Primavera league champions.

Prior to that victory, Corelli made her unofficial debut for Roma's senior team in a pre-season friendly against Florentia San Gimignano on 29 July 2020. Corelli scored her first senior goal for the club in the opening first minute of play against Florentia. Corelli would then follow up her Primavera success by winning a second consecutive league title on 29 May 2021. Roma Primavera once again beat Juventus Primavera in the league final to retain their title.

Corelli starting the 29 May 2021 Primavera final meant she effectively sacrificed any chance of appearing for the Roma senior team in the 2021 Coppa Italia final the next day. Corelli would not have enough recovery time to make an appearance, but saw her Roma side beat AC Milan in the 30 May 2021 final on penalties to win the 2021 Coppa Italia. Corelli had played for Roma earlier in the competition and picked up a Coppa Italia winner's medal along with her teammates.

== Style of play ==
Despite her robust stature that would normally be associated with a traditional centre-forward, Corelli shows an ability to take on and dribble past her opponents with the ball. Corelli looks to pick up the ball on the flanks before moving inside to goal. She also displays an accomplished first touch and ball control.

== Honours ==
Roma

- Serie A: 2025–26
- Coppa Italia: 2020–21, 2025–26
- Supercoppa: 2024

Individual

- Primavera top scorer: 2018–19
- Serie A Team of the Season (Under-23): 2025–26
