= Giada Pellegrino Cimò =

Italian footballer (born 2006)

Personal information
- Date of birth: 7 October 2006 (age 20)
- Place of birth: Palermo, Italy
- Height: 1.62 m (5 ft 4 in)
- Position: Forward

Team information
- Current team: Roma
- Number: 14

Youth career
- –2022: Palermo
- 2022–2024: Roma

Senior career*
Years	Team	Apps	(Gls)
2023–	Roma	5	(3)
2024–2025	→ Sampdoria (loan)	23	(1)
2025–2026	→ Ternana (loan)	16	(5)

International career^{‡}
2022–2023	Italy U17	11	(8)
2024–2025	Italy U19	13	(6)
2025-	Italy U20	7	(2)
- * Club domestic league appearances and goals as of 25 October 2026 (UTC) ‡ National team caps and goals as of 26 September 2026

Giada Pellegrino Cimò (born 7 October 2006) is an Italian professional footballer who plays as a forward for Serie A Women club Roma and the Italy under-20 national team.
