= Centro Sportivo di Formello =

S.S. Lazio Training Center
- Interactive map of S.S. Lazio Training Center
- Address: Via di Santa Cornelia, 1000 - 00060 Formello (RM)
- Location: Roma-Formello; Lazio, Italy
- Owner: Società Sportiva Lazio S.p.A.
- Type: Football training ground

Construction
- Opened: 1997

Website
- http://www.sslazio.it/it/

S.S. Lazio Training Center, also known as Centro Sportivo di Formello, is S.S. Lazio's training ground. It is located on the outside of Formello, a village in the Province of Roma. Commissioned by the president Sergio Cragnotti, the facility was built in the years 1995–97. The works started in 1995 and they were built in just two years, so that from the spring of 1997, with a rite presentation on April 7, the 'Aquile' were trained at the Formello.

== Structure ==
The sports center that houses the Lazio team extends over an area of 40 hectares comprising a main field where the first team is trained and hosts the home games of S.S Lazio Primavera; this field was titled in 2012 in the memory of Mirko Fersini, a white-collar nursery footballer who disappeared in a major road accident in April of the same year.

The sports facility includes other regular football pitches to train the various youth teams in Lazio, as well as planned under the "Roberto Lovati" Academy project, created for the will of the current president Claudio Lotito, gymnasiums, tennis courts, swimming pools, a guesthouse where to stay, a Club House, a medical center specializing in both rehabilitation and physiotherapy, a technologically used conference room for press conferences, and another for marketing operations and official presentation of memberships.

There is also the editorial office of the Lazio Style 1900 Official Magazine in the sports center, in addition to the futuristic television and radio studios from which the programming of Lazio Style Channel And Lazio Style Radio.
