= FC Como Women =

Women's association football club in Italy

F.C. Como Women
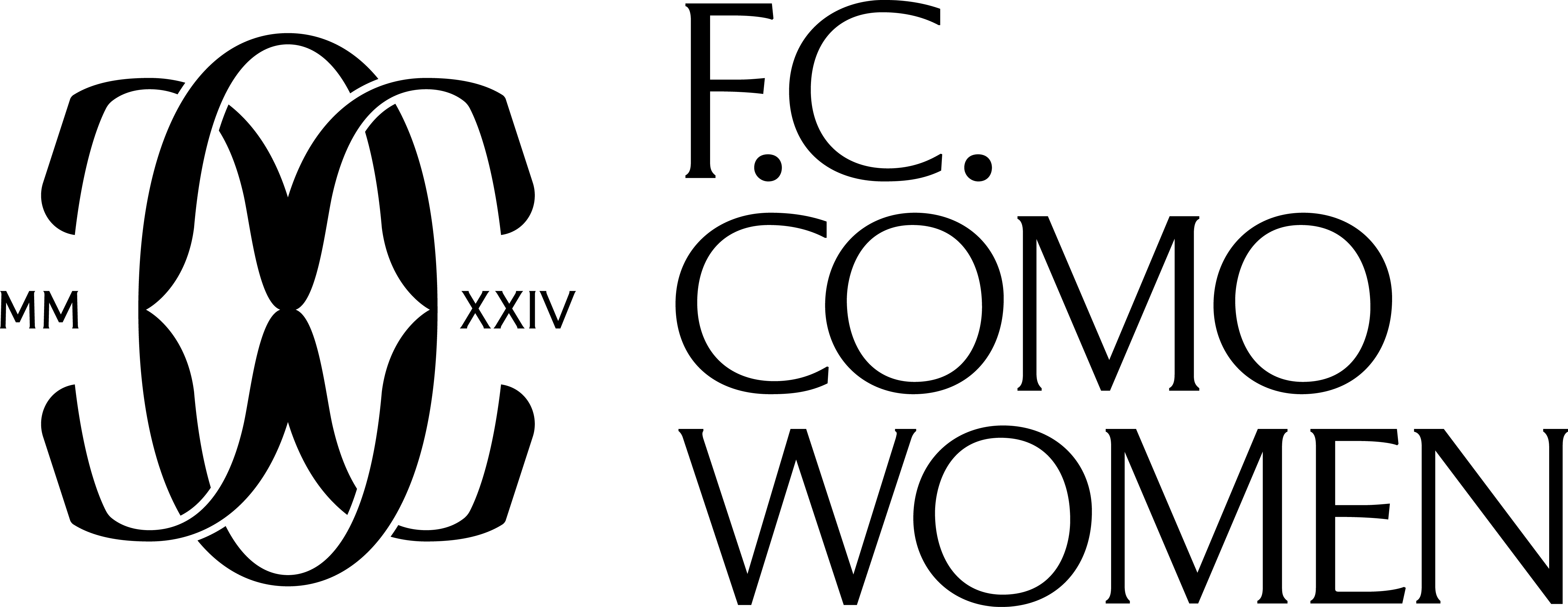
- Full name: F.C. Como Women S.r.l.
- Nickname: Azzurre (The Blues)
- Founded: 1997
- Ground: Stadio Ferruccio, Seregno
- Capacity: 3,500
- Owner: Mercury/13
- President: Stefano Verga
- Manager: Stefano Sottili
- League: Serie A
- 2025–26: 8th of 12
- Website: comowomen.com
Home colours	Away colours

F.C. Como Women, known as Como Women or simply Como, is an Italian football club from Como, currently playing in Serie A, the national league's top division of football.

== History ==
Founded in 1991 as a section of Polisportiva Vigor Grandate, it became an independent club taking the name FCF Como 2000 in 1997. The following year Como was promoted to Serie B, and in 2001 it reached Serie A for the first time. In its debut Serie A season Como narrowly avoided relegation. Ending tied on points with second-to-last ACF Gravina, a play-off had to be played, which Como won 3–2. The team improved the next season, ranking 10th, seven points above the relegation zone. However in 2004 the team earned just 13 points and was relegated.

The return to the second category was not easy with FCF Como narrowly avoiding the relegation play-off. Como gradually consolidated at the lower level and from 2009 it began challenging for promotion with a third place finish. After a disappointing 2010 season, in 2011 Como tied at the top of the table with ACF Milan. A play-off determined which team promoted, which Milan won 0–1. However, in August ASD Reggiana was excluded from Serie A and Como was chosen to take its place.

In 2016–17 Como returned to Serie A. A poor start to the season meant that after two matches they replaced the coach Dolores Prestifilippo with Giuseppe Gerosa.

== Players ==
=== Current squad ===
As of 21 September 2026

Note: Flags indicate national team as defined under FIFA eligibility rules; some limited exceptions apply. Players may hold more than one non-FIFA nationality.

No.	Pos.	Nation	Player
2	DF	DEN	Agnete Marcussen
3	DF	USA	Kaylie Ronan
4	DF	NOR	Selma Igesund Saga
5	DF	SCO	Sophie Howard
6	DF	NOR	Mina Bergersen
7	MF	ITA	Nadine Nischler
8	MF	BEL	Lena Hubaut
9	FW	ITA	Veronica Bernardi
10	MF	AUS	Alex Chidiac
11	MF	ALB	Fortesa Berisha
12	FW	DEN	Agnete Nielsen
13	MF	BER	Leilanni Nesbeth
14	DF	ITA	Chiara Cecotti
16	FW	ITA	Ginevra Moretti (on loan from Juventus)

No.	Pos.	Nation	Player
17	MF	ITA	Valery Vigilucci
18	MF	HUN	Viktória Szabó
19	MF	ESP	Laura Mas Serra
20	MF	ITA	Flaminia Simonetti
21	DF	ITA	Martina Viesti
22	GK	ITA	Astrid Gilardi
23	FW	ITA	Ginevra D'Agostino
24	DF	ITA	Chiara Bianchi
27	MF	ITA	Marta Zamboni (on loan from Juventus)
30	GK	ITA	Giulia Ruma
32	GK	SUR	Selena Babb
73	GK	ITA	Ilarira Zizioli
77	DF	DEN	Linnéa Borbye

=== Out on loan ===
Note: Flags indicate national team as defined under FIFA eligibility rules; some limited exceptions apply. Players may hold more than one non-FIFA nationality.

No.	Pos.	Nation	Player
21	MF	ITA	Miriam Picchi (at Genoa until 30 June 2027)

=== Former players ===
- (Slovakia) Maria Korenciova

== Managerial history ==
Name	Years	Refs
(Italy) Stefano Sottili	August 2024 – 5 February 2026	
(Italy) Paolo Tramezzani	10 February 2026 –	

== Year by year ==
- 1991 – 4 – 2nd (Gr.A)
- 1992 – 3 – 12th
- 1993 – 3 – 13th [R]
- 1994 – 4 – 1st (Gr.A) [P]
- 1995 – 3 – 6th
- 1996 – 3 – 12th
- 1997 – 3 – 5th
- 1998 – 3 – 1st [P]
- 1999 – 2 – 4th (Gr.A)
- 2000 – 2 – 2nd (Gr.A)
- 2001 – 2 – 1st (Gr.A) [P]
- 2002 – 1 – 12th
- 2003 – 1 – 10th
- 2004 – 1 – 13th [R]
- 2005 – 2 – 9th (Gr.A)
- 2006 – 2 – 8th (Gr.A)
- 2007 – 2 – 4th (Gr.A)
- 2008 – 2 – 6th (Gr.A)
- 2009 – 2 – 3rd (Gr.A)
- 2010 – 2 – 7th (Gr.A)
- 2011 – 2 – 2nd (Gr.A) [P]
