= AS Roma (women) =

Italian football club

Roma
- Full name: Associazione Sportiva Roma S.p.A.
- Nicknames: Le Giallorosse (The Yellow and Reds); La Lupa (The She-Wolf); La Maggica (The Maggic One)
- Short name: Roma Women
- Founded: July 2018; 8 years ago
- Ground: Stadio Tre Fontane
- Capacity: 4,000
- Owner: The Friedkin Group (86.6%)
- President: Dan Friedkin
- Manager: Gianpiero Piovani
- League: Serie A
- 2025–26: Serie A, 1st of 12 (champions)
- Website: www.asroma.com/en
Home colours	Away colours	Third colours

Associazione Sportiva Roma (lit. Rome Sport Association), commonly referred to as simply Roma ([ˈroːma]) or Roma Femminile ([ˈroːma femmiˈnile]) and Roma Women, is an Italian women's association football club based in Rome, section of the homonymous professional football club. It was established in 2018 by acquiring the Serie A license of SSD Res Roma. The team competes in Serie A and debuted in 2018–19 league season.

== History ==
Res Roma competed in the Serie A since 2003 but chose to hand over their competition license at the end of the 2017–18 Serie A season, allowing A.S. Roma to take over the license and begin life as a club in the top tier. The team won the Serie A in the 2022–23, 2023–24 and 2025–26 seasons.

The club conquered its first major trophy in the 2020-21 season when Roma won the 2021 Coppa Italia.As Roma Women went on to win the 2024 and 2026 Coppa Italia. Betty Bavagnoli worked as the club's head coach during the first three seasons of A.S. Roma's existence, later taking up the job of Head of Women's Football at the club. She was succeeded as head coach of the Roma senior squad by Alessandro Spugna. The club's first-ever captain is Italian and Roman defender Elisa Bartoli. The first ever Coppa Italia Women won by AS Roma was played the 30th of May 2021, against Milan, where the "Giallorosse" tied in normal time, then winning on penalties.

Roma won its first Serie A title on 29 April 2023, after a 2–1 victory over Fiorentina.

The following year, Roma won the domestic double, securing the Serie A title and the Coppa Italia. In the 2025–26 season, Roma won another domestic double, securing the Serie A title and the Coppa Italia.

== Players ==
=== Current squad ===
As of 24 September 2026

Note: Flags indicate national team as defined under FIFA eligibility rules; some limited exceptions apply. Players may hold more than one non-FIFA nationality.

No.	Pos.	Nation	Player
1	GK	CZE	Olivie Lukášová
4	DF	AUS	Wini Heatley
5	DF	CAN	Maya Antoine
6	MF	USA	Maya Doms
7	FW	FIN	Sofia Jahnukainen
8	MF	NED	Kayleigh van Dooren
10	MF	ITA	Manuela Giugliano (captain)
11	FW	SUI	Alayah Pilgrim
12	DF	CAN	Ella Ottey
13	DF	ITA	Elisabetta Oliviero
14	FW	ITA	Giada Pellegrino Cimò
16	FW	ITA	Alice Corelli

No.	Pos.	Nation	Player
18	FW	ITA	Martina Piemonte
19	DF	NGR	Shukurat Oladipo
20	MF	ITA	Giada Greggi
22	MF	ITA	Marta Pandini
23	MF	ITA	Valentina Bergamaschi
24	GK	ITA	Rachele Baldi
25	DF	DEN	Frederikke Thøgersen
29	MF	GER	Annalena Rieke
30	FW	NGR	Rinsola Babajide
32	DF	ITA	Bianca Vergani
36	GK	ITA	Valentina Soggiu
78	DF	POL	Magda Piekarska

=== Youth players ===
Note: Flags indicate national team as defined under FIFA eligibility rules; some limited exceptions apply. Players may hold more than one non-FIFA nationality.

No.	Pos.	Nation	Player
71	GK	ITA	Giulia Mazzochi
—	DF	ITA	Sara Terlizzi
—	FW	MLT	Lexine Farrugia
—	FW	NED	Silver van Hetten

=== Out on loan ===
Note: Flags indicate national team as defined under FIFA eligibility rules; some limited exceptions apply. Players may hold more than one non-FIFA nationality.

No.	Pos.	Nation	Player
—	MF	KOR	Kim Shin-ji (at Alavés until 30 June 2027)
—	FW	CAN	Mia Pante (at Vancouver Rise FC until 31 December 2026)

== Honours ==
- Serie A
  - Winners (3): 2022–23, 2023–24, 2025–26
- Coppa Italia
  - Winners (3): 2020–21, 2023–24, 2025–26
- Supercoppa Italiana
  - Winners (2): 2022, 2024

== Record in UEFA competitions ==
All results (away, home and aggregate) list the club's goal tally first.

Competition	Round	Club	Away	Home	Aggregate
2022–23	Qualifying round 1 SF	(Scotland) Glasgow City	3–1		
2022–23	Qualifying round 1 F	(France) Paris FC	0–0 a.e.t. (5–4p)		
2022–23	Qualifying round 2	(Czech Republic) Sparta Prague	2–1 ^{f}	4–1	6–2
2022–23	Group stage	(Germany) VfL Wolfsburg	2–4	1–1 ^{f}	2nd
2022–23	Group stage	(Austria) St. Pölten	4–3 ^{f}	5–0	2nd
2022–23	Group stage	(Czech Republic) Slavia Prague	3–0	1–0 ^{f}	2nd
2022–23	Quarter-final	(Spain) Barcelona	0–1	1–5 ^{f}	1–6
2023–24	Qualifying round 2	(Ukraine) Vorskla Poltava	5–0	3–0 ^{f}	9–1
2023–24	Group stage	(Germany) Bayern Munich	2–2 ^{f}	2–2	4th
2023–24	Group stage	(Netherlands) Ajax	1–2	3–0 ^{f}	4th
2023–24	Group stage	(France) Paris Saint-Germain	1–2 ^{f}	1–3	4th
2024–25	Qualifying round 2	(Switzerland) Servette	7–2	3–1 ^{f}	10–3
2024–25	Group stage	(Germany) VfL Wolfsburg	1–0	1–6	3rd
2024–25	Group stage	(Turkey) Galatasaray	3–0	6–1	3rd
2024–25	Group stage	(France) Lyon	0–3	1–4	3rd
2025–26	Qualifying round 2	(Kazakhstan) Aktobe		2–0 ^{f}	2–0
2025–26	Qualifying round 2	(Czech Republic) Sparta Prague		5–1 ^{f}	5–1
2025–26	Qualifying round 3	(Portugal) Sporting CP	2–0	1–2	3–2
2025–26	League phase	(Spain) Real Madrid	2–6	—N/a	14th
2025–26	League phase	(Spain) Barcelona	—N/a	0–4	14th
2025–26	League phase	(Norway) Vålerenga	—N/a	0–1	14th
2025–26	League phase	(Belgium) OH Leuven	1–1	—N/a	14th
2025–26	League phase	(England) Chelsea	0–6	—N/a	14th
2025–26	League phase	(Austria) St. Pölten	—N/a	6–1	14th

== See also ==
- List of women's association football clubs
- List of women's football clubs in Italy
