= 2013 UEFA Women's Under-19 Championship first qualifying round =

Football tournament qualification stage

2013 UEFA Women's Under-19 Championship First Qualifying Round will be the first round of qualifications for the Final Tournament of 2013 UEFA Women's Under-19 Championship, which will be held in Wales.

The 40 teams were divided into 10 groups of four teams, with each group being contested as a mini-tournament, hosted by one of the group's teams. After all matches have been played, the 10 group winners and 10 group runners-up along with the best third-placed team will advance to the second qualifying round.

Wales qualified as hosts while England, France and Germany received byes to the second round as the sides with the highest coefficients.

The draw was made on 15 November 2011 at UEFA headquarters in Nyon. Matches was played from 20 to 25 October 2012.

== Seeding ==
Seeding of the four drawing pots is based on the past three seasons of qualifying. The hosts of the ten one-venue mini-tournament groups are indicated below in italics.

== Tiebreakers ==
Tie-breakers between teams with the same number of points are:

1. Higher number of points obtained in the matches played between the teams in question
2. Superior goal difference resulting from the matches played between the teams in question
3. Higher number of goals scored in the matches played between the teams in question

If now two teams still are tied, reapply tie-breakers 1-3, if this does not break the tie, go on.

1. Superior goal difference in all group matches
2. Higher number of goals scored in all group matches
3. Drawing of lots

== Group 1 ==
Team	Pld	W	D	L	GF	GA	GD	Pts
Republic of Ireland	3	3	0	0	17	2	+15	9
Serbia	3	2	0	1	27	3	+24	6
Cyprus	3	1	0	2	1	13	−12	3
Latvia	3	0	0	3	0	27	−27	0

20 October 2012
14:30 CEST

Republic of Ireland	3 – 0	Cyprus
O'Sullivan 21'; McGuinness 45'; Jarrett 61'	Report

Stadion FK Inđija, Inđija
Attendance: 50
Referee: Riem Hussein (Germany)

20 October 2012
14:30 CEST

Serbia	15 – 0	Latvia
Trišić 8'; Stanković 18', 24', 41', 48'; Damnjanović 19', 29', 39', 44', 55', 79'; Krstić 27'; Velickovic 51', 90'; Lazarević 90+1'	Report

Stadion FK Srem, Jakovo
Attendance: 100
Referee: Dimitrina Milkova (Bulgaria)

22 October 2012
14:30 CEST

Republic of Ireland	11 – 0	Latvia
Shine 10', 21', 45+2'; Hansberry 30', 49' (pen.), 79'; Johnson 53'; McCabe 58', 74'; Nolan 61'; McGuinness 89'	Report

Stadion FK Srem, Jakovo
Attendance: 35
Referee: Dimitrina Milkova (Bulgaria)

22 October 2012
14:30 CEST

Cyprus	0 – 10	Serbia
	Report	12', 68', 78', 80' Damnjanović; 19', 53' Stanković; 28' Trišić; 55', 87' Velickovic; 75' Sopka

Stadion FK Inđija, Inđija
Attendance: 50
Referee: Knarik Grigoryan (Armenia)

25 October 2012
14:00 CEST

Serbia	2 – 3	Republic of Ireland
Damnjanović 36'; Čubrilo 54' (pen.)	Report	3' McCabe; 59' O'Sullivan; 74' Hansberry

Stadion FK Srem, Jakovo
Attendance: 50
Referee: Riem Hussein (GER)

25 October 2012
14:00 CEST

Latvia	0 – 1	Cyprus
	Report	53' Georgiou

Stadion FK Inđija, Inđija
Attendance: 50
Referee: Knarik Grigoryan (ARM)

== Group 2 ==
Team	Pld	W	D	L	GF	GA	GD	Pts
Italy	3	2	1	0	10	1	+9	7
Austria	3	2	0	1	7	4	+3	6
Greece	3	1	1	1	5	3	+2	4
Kazakhstan	3	0	0	3	0	14	−14	0

20 October 2012
11:00 CEST

Italy	6 – 0	Kazakhstan
Pugnali 8', 51'; Zecca 22'; Moscia 36'; Giacinti 72'; Piacezzi 83'	Report

Lindabrunn Stadion, Enzesfeld-Lindabrunn
Referee: Sharon Sluyts (Belgium)

20 October 2012
15:00 CEST

Austria	2 – 1	Greece
Dujmenović 31', 58'	Report	66' Lymperakaki

Alpenstadion Gloggnitz, Gloggnitz
Referee: Dilan Deniz Gökçek (Turkey)

22 October 2012
11:00 CEST

Greece	1 – 1	Italy
Kokoviadou 35'	Report	38' Ciccotti

Lindabrunn Stadion, Enzesfeld-Lindabrunn
Referee: Nelli Stepanyan (Armenia)

22 October 2012
15:00 CEST

Austria	5 – 0	Kazakhstan
Ehold 13'; Dujmenović 21'; Prvulovic 26'; Tabotta 35'; Bauer 44'	Report

Alpenstadion Gloggnitz, Gloggnitz
Referee: Sharon Sluyts (Belgium)

25 October 2012
14:00 CEST

Italy	3 – 0	Austria
Moscia 11'; Giacinti 34'; Cannone 60'	Report

Alpenstadion Gloggnitz, Gloggnitz
Referee: Dilan Deniz Gökçek (TUR)

25 October 2012
14:00 CEST

Kazakhstan	0 – 3	Greece
	Report	2' Mitkou; 22' Vardali; 43' Kokoviadou

Lindabrunn Stadion, Enzesfeld-Lindabrunn
Referee: Nelli Stepanyan (Armenia)

== Group 3 ==
Team	Pld	W	D	L	GF	GA	GD	Pts
Ukraine	3	2	1	0	12	1	+11	7
Belgium	3	2	1	0	5	0	+5	7
Croatia	3	1	0	2	5	4	+1	3
Faroe Islands	3	0	0	3	1	18	−17	0

20 October 2012
14:00 CEST

Ukraine	10 – 0	Faroe Islands
Shylova 3'; Kravets 9', 42', 85'; Kalinina 10', 26'; Khimich 19', 83'; Korsun 32'; Moloshyk 90+3' (pen.)	Report

Sv. Josip Radnik stadium, Sesvete
Referee: Sjoukje de Jong (Netherlands)

20 October 2012
15:30 CEST

Belgium	1 – 0	Croatia
Biesmans 33'	Report

Football Center Stjepan Spajić, Zagreb
Referee: Justyna Zajac (Poland)

22 October 2012
14:00 CEST

Ukraine	2 – 1	Croatia
Khimich 16'; Kalinina 87'	Report	62' Martić

Lučko stadium, Zagreb
Referee: Justyna Zajac (Poland)

22 October 2012
14:00 CEST

Faroe Islands	0 – 4	Belgium
	Report	7' Wajnblum; 45' Vanhamel; 52', 63' Van Gorp

Peščanica stadium, Zagreb
Referee: Olga Zadinová (Czech Republic)

25 October 2012
14:00 CEST

Belgium	0 – 0	Ukraine
	Report

Sport Center Rudeš, Zagreb
Referee: Sjoukje de Jong (NED)

25 October 2012
14:00 CEST

Croatia	4 – 1	Faroe Islands
Conjar 10', 42'; Kotarac 64'; Martić 90+2'	Report	86' (pen.) Klakstein

Radnik stadium, Velika Gorica
Referee: Olga Zadinová (CZE)

== Group 4 ==
Team	Pld	W	D	L	GF	GA	GD	Pts
Northern Ireland	3	3	0	0	9	2	+7	9
Hungary	3	2	0	1	8	5	+3	6
Poland	3	1	0	2	11	5	+6	3
Lithuania	3	0	0	3	0	16	−16	0

20 October 2012
14:00 CEST

Hungary	3 – 0	Lithuania
Mosdóczi 13', 46'; Vöfély 24'	Report

Rohonci Street Stadium, Szombathely
Referee: Sandra Bastos (Portugal)

20 October 2012
14:00 CEST

Poland	0 – 2	Northern Ireland
	Report	12', 25' Magill

Stadium Bük, Bük
Referee: Ana Jovanović (Serbia)

22 October 2012
14:00 CEST

Hungary	2 – 3	Northern Ireland
Nicholas 19' (o.g.); Zeller 69'	Report	52' Nicholas; 61' Magill; 88' McGuinness

Kiraly Sportcentre, Szombathely
Referee: Ana Jovanović (Serbia)

22 October 2012
14:00 CEST

Lithuania	0 – 9	Poland
	Report	8' Sass; 14', 51' (pen.) Guściora; 33', 37' Balcerzak; 55', 57' Cichosz; 63' Kaletka; 81' Dereń

Rohonci Street Stadium, Szombathely
Referee: Zuzana Strpkova (Slovakia)

25 October 2012
14:00 CEST

Poland	2 – 3	Hungary
Cichosz 45', 48'	Report	32' Nagy; 67' Kókány; 90' Bereczki

Kiraly Sportcentre, Szombathely
Referee: Sandra Bastos (POR)

25 October 2012
14:30 CEST

Northern Ireland	4 – 0	Lithuania
Nicholas 17'; Magill 23', 27', 35'	Report

Stadium Bük, Bük
Referee: Zuzana Strpkova (SVK)

== Group 5 ==
Team	Pld	W	D	L	GF	GA	GD	Pts
Norway	3	3	0	0	5	1	+4	9
Scotland	3	2	0	1	10	1	+9	6
Turkey	3	1	0	2	2	4	−2	3
Belarus	3	0	0	3	1	12	−11	0

20 October 2012
14:00 EEST

Scotland	8 – 0	Belarus
Grant 11'; Richardson 26', 29', 43'; Richards 33'; Weir 61'; Smith 67'; Clark 88'	Report

World of Wonders Football Centre 2, Antalya
Referee: Sara Persson (Sweden)

20 October 2012
16:00 EEST

Norway	2 – 0	Turkey
Risa 8'; Naalsund 30'	Report

World of Wonders Football Centre, Antalya
Referee: Karolina Radzik-Johan (Poland)

22 October 2012
14:00 EEST

Norway	2 – 1	Belarus
Hauge 62'; Reiten 75'	Report	55' Krasnova

World of Wonders Football Centre 2, Antalya
Referee: Sara Persson (Sweden)

22 October 2012
16:00 EEST

Turkey	0 – 2	Scotland
	Report	7', 90' Richards

World of Wonders Football Centre, Antalya
Referee: Florence Guillemin (France)

25 October 2012
15:00 EEST

Scotland	0 – 1	Norway
	Report	5' Reiten

World of Wonders Football Centre 2, Antalya
Referee: Karolina Radzik-Johan (POL)

25 October 2012
15:00 EEST

Belarus	0 – 2	Turkey
	Report	26', 57' Göksu

World of Wonders Football Centre, Antalya
Referee: Florence Guillemin (FRA)

== Group 6 ==
Team	Pld	W	D	L	GF	GA	GD	Pts
Denmark	3	3	0	0	19	1	+18	9
Iceland	3	2	0	1	10	3	+7	6
Slovakia	3	0	1	2	1	10	−9	1
Moldova	3	0	1	2	1	17	−16	1

20 October 2012
12:00 CEST

Iceland	4 – 0	Slovakia
Jensen 64', 88'; Gardarsdóttir 67'; Gudmundsdóttir 80'	Report

Stadium Guldager, Esbjerg
Referee: Eleni Lampadariou (Greece)

20 October 2012
15:00 CEST

Denmark	11 – 0	Moldova
Jensen 7'; C. Andersen 9', 34', 39', 44'; Nielsen 10'; Thøgersen 43'; Madsen 48'; Jans 59'; K. Andersen 68'; Thestrup 87'	Report

Sport og Event Park Esbjerg, Esbjerg
Referee: Rhona Daly (Republic of Ireland)

22 October 2012
14:00 CEST

Denmark	5 – 0	Slovakia
Nielsen 41'; Pedersen 47', 85'; Andersen 48'; Thestrup 87'	Report

Varde Idrætspark, Varde
Referee: Eleni Lampadariou (Greece)

22 October 2012
14:00 CEST

Moldova	0 – 5	Iceland
	Report	10', 27' Jensen; 25' Gardarsdóttir; 74' Thrastardóttir; 78' (pen.) Óladóttir

Sport og Event Park Esbjerg, Esbjerg
Referee: Lilach Asulin (Israel)

25 October 2012
14:00 CEST

Iceland	1 – 3	Denmark
Jensen 48'	Report	1' Jans; 4' Andersen; 49' Nielsen

Sport og Event Park Esbjerg, Esbjerg
Referee: Rhona Daly (IRL)

25 October 2012
14:00 CEST

Slovakia	1 – 1	Moldova
Šušolová 72'	Report	90' Ostapenco

Varde Idrætspark, Varde
Referee: Lilach Asulin (ISR)

== Group 7 ==
Team	Pld	W	D	L	GF	GA	GD	Pts
Finland	3	3	0	0	19	1	+18	9
Spain	3	2	0	1	24	2	+22	6
Bulgaria	3	1	0	2	3	14	−11	3
Estonia	3	0	0	3	1	30	−29	0

20 October 2012
15:00 EEST

Spain	16 –0	Estonia
Putellas 19', 37', 45'; Pinel 22', 47'; Andrés 28', 53'; Ortiz 33', 52', 60', 81'; Jiménez 38', 74'; Fraile 57'; Troyano 66', 75'	Report

Albena 1 stadium, Albena
Referee: Simona Ghisletta (Switzerland)

20 October 2012
15:00 EEST

Finland	6 – 0	Bulgaria
Heroum 6', 87'; Engman 14', 82'; Kuikka 41'; Huusko 85'	Report

Kavarna Stadium, Kavarna
Referee: Cristina Bujor (Romania)

22 October 2012
15:00 EEST

Spain	7 – 0	Bulgaria
Jiménez 12', 38'; Ortiz 25'; Putellas 35', 70'; Pinel 55'; Gutiérrez 90+3'	Report

Kavarna Stadium, Kavarna
Referee: Cristina Bujor (Romania)

22 October 2012
15:00 EEST

Estonia	0 – 11	Finland
	Report	10', 53' Ketoja; 15' (pen.), 23', 42' (pen.) Engman; 55', 65' Kemppi; 63' Koivisto; 74', 90+4' Iskanius

Albena 1 stadium, Albena
Referee: Mihaela Gurdon Basimamović (Croatia)

25 October 2012
15:00 EEST

Finland	2 – 1	Spain
Kemppi 77'; Koivisto 85'	Report	56' Fraile

Albena 1 stadium, Albena
Referee: Simona Ghisletta (SUI)

25 October 2012
15:00 EEST

Bulgaria	3 – 1	Estonia
Popadiynova 5'; Boycheva 24'; Mihaylova 49'	Report	62' Toom

Kavarna Stadium, Kavarna
Referee: Mihaela Gurdon Basimamović (CRO)

== Group 8 ==
Team	Pld	W	D	L	GF	GA	GD	Pts
Czech Republic	3	2	1	0	17	3	+14	7
Portugal	3	2	1	0	5	3	+2	7
Bosnia and Herzegovina	3	1	0	2	3	7	−4	3
Macedonia	3	0	0	3	1	13	−12	0

20 October 2012
14:30 CEST

Czech Republic	6 – 1	Bosnia and Herzegovina
Krejčiříková 37'; Danihelková 52', 59'; Brázdová 73'; Hloupá 81'; Kinclová 85'	Report	78' Kadrić

Asim Ferhatović Hase Stadium, Sarajevo
Referee: Anastasia Pustovoitova (Russia)

20 October 2012
14:30 CEST

Portugal	2 – 1	Macedonia
Silva 5'; Malho 85'	Report	86' Krivanjeva

Gradski SRC Slavija, Istočno Sarajevo
Referee: Eszter Urban (Hungary)

22 October 2012
14:30 CEST

Czech Republic	9 – 0	Macedonia
Krejčiříková 3'; Šturmová A. 27'; Kinclová 42'; Nováková 48'; Hloupá 49', 84'; Tauberová 58'; Šturmová E. 67', 82'	Report

Gradski SRC Slavija, Istočno Sarajevo
Referee: Eszter Urban (Hungary)

22 October 2012
14:30 CEST

Bosnia and Herzegovina	0 – 1	Portugal
	Report	Gomes 48'

Asim Ferhatović Hase Stadium, Sarajevo
Referee: Monika Mularczyk (Poland)

25 October 2012
14:00 CEST

Portugal	2 – 2	Czech Republic
Malho 5'; Silva 70'	Report	Šturmová E. 20'; Danihelková 40'

Gradski SRC Slavija, Istočno Sarajevo
Referee: Anastasia Pustovoitova (Russia)

25 October 2012
14:00 CEST

Macedonia	0 – 2	Bosnia and Herzegovina
	Report	Mujanović 20'; Hasanbegović 57'

Asim Ferhatović Hase Stadium, Sarajevo
Referee: Monika Mularczyk (Poland)

== Group 9 ==
Team	Pld	W	D	L	GF	GA	GD	Pts
Sweden	3	2	1	0	16	0	+16	7
Russia	3	1	2	0	6	1	+5	5
Slovenia	3	1	1	1	7	7	0	4
Azerbaijan	3	0	0	3	0	22	−22	0

20 October 2012
13:00 MSK

Sweden	6 – 0	Slovenia
Anker-Kofoed 30'; Banušić 32', 49', 77'; Hammarlund 45'; Larsson 88'	Report

Stadium Giant, Krymsk
Referee: Elia Martinez (Spain)

20 October 2012
16:00 MSK

Russia	5 – 0	Azerbaijan
Kovalenko 19'; Karpova 39', 54'; Piskunova 57'; Konyukhova 73'	Report

Stadium Giant, Krymsk
Referee: Olga Tanschi (Moldova)

22 October 2012
13:00 MSK

Sweden	10 – 0	Azerbaijan
Anker-Kofoed 8'; Baghirova 30' (o.g.); Benediktsson 45+1'; Banušić 48', 58', 60', 66'; Andersson 80'; Larsson 90', 90+5'	Report

Stadium Giant, Krymsk
Referee: Olga Tanschi (Moldova)

22 October 2012
16:00 MSK

Slovenia	1 – 1	Russia
Begič 88'	Report	82' Kiskonen

Stadium Giant, Krymsk
Referee: Zuzana Kováčová (Slovakia)

25 October 2012
16:00 MSK

Russia	0 – 0	Sweden
	Report

Stadium Giant, Krymsk
Referee: Elia Martinez (ESP)

25 October 2012
16:00 MSK

Azerbaijan	0 – 6	Slovenia
	Report	3', 64' Šiljak; 47' Antolin; 58' Eržen; 73' Begič; 83' Skalič

Stadium Giant, Krymsk
Referee: Zuzana Kováčová (SVK)

== Group 10 ==
Team	Pld	W	D	L	GF	GA	GD	Pts
Switzerland	3	3	0	0	11	2	+9	9
Netherlands	3	2	0	1	8	6	+2	6
Romania	3	1	0	2	3	5	−2	3
Israel	3	0	0	3	0	9	−9	0

20 October 2012
16:00 CEST

Switzerland	5 – 0	Israel
Ismaili 7', 49'; Deplazes 21', 33'; Stapelfeldt 75'	Report

Stadion Eizmoos, Cham
Referee: Kadriye Gökçek (Turkey)

20 October 2012
18:00 CEST

Netherlands	4 – 1	Romania
Kuijpers 41' van der Veen 55'; Coolen 74'; Bosveld 79'	Report	27' Lunca

Kleinfeld Stadium, Kriens
Referee: Marte Sørø (Norway)

22 October 2012
19:00 CEST

Netherlands	2 – 0	Israel
Braskamp 51' van der Veen 75'	Report

Stadion Eizmoos, Cham
Referee: Kadriye Gökçek (Turkey)

22 October 2012
19:00 CEST

Romania	0 – 1	Switzerland
	Report	22' Thürig

Thermoplan Arena, Weggis
Referee: Sarah Garratt (England)

25 October 2012
14:00 CEST

Switzerland	5 – 2	Netherlands
Bernet 25'; Stöckli 34'; Vreugdenhil 52' (o.g.); Ismaili 66'	Report	Selimi 16' (o.g.); Kuijpers 45'

Kleinfeld Stadium, Kriens
Referee: Marte Sørø (NOR)

25 October 2012
14:00 CEST

Israel	0 – 2	Romania
	Report	Lunca 36'; Dicu 74'

Thermoplan Arena, Weggis
Referee: Sarah Garratt (ENG)

== Ranking of third-placed teams ==
To determine the best third-placed from the first qualifying round, only the results against the winners and the runner-up teams in each group were taken into account.

=== Tiebreakers ===
The following criteria are applied to determine the rankings:

1. higher number of points obtained in these matches
2. superior goal difference from these matches
3. higher number of goals scored in these matches
4. fair play conduct of the teams in all group matches in the first qualifying round
5. drawing of lots

Grp	Team	Pld	W	D	L	GF	GA	GD	Pts
2	Greece	2	0	1	1	2	3	−1	1
9	Slovenia	2	0	1	1	1	7	−6	1
3	Croatia	2	0	0	2	1	3	−2	0
4	Poland	2	0	0	2	2	5	−3	0
10	Romania	2	0	0	2	1	5	−4	0
5	Turkey	2	0	0	2	0	4	−4	0
8	Bosnia and Herzegovina	2	0	0	2	1	7	−6	0
6	Slovakia	2	0	0	2	0	9	−9	0
1	Cyprus	2	0	0	2	0	13	−13	0
7	Bulgaria	2	0	0	2	0	13	−13	0
