= 2011 UEFA Women's Under-17 Championship =

Tournament details
- Host country: Switzerland
- Dates: 28–31 July
- Teams: 4
- Venue: 1 (in 1 host city)

Final positions
- Champions: Spain (2nd title)
- Runners-up: France
- Third place: Germany
- Fourth place: Iceland

Tournament statistics
- Top scorer: (Germany) Annabel Jäger
- Best player: (Spain) Alba Pomares

The 2011 UEFA Women's Under-17 Championship was the fourth edition of the UEFA Women's Under-17 Championship. Spain was the title holder. Like the previous tournaments, there were two qualifying rounds.

== Qualification ==
	Teams entering in this round	Teams advancing from previous round	Competition format
First qualifying round (40 teams)	40 teams from associations ranked 2–53		10 groups of 4 teams, hosted by one club, seeded into four pots by UEFA coefficient
Second qualifying round (16 teams)	Germany (ranked 1)	10 group winners from 1st qualifying round; 5 best group runners-up from 1st qualifying round	4 groups of 4 teams, hosted by one club, seeded into four pots by UEFA coefficient
Final tournament (4 teams)		4 group winners from 2nd qualifying round	semi-finals, final

=== First qualifying round ===
Forty teams entered in this round. There were ten groups of four teams each. The ten champions and the five best runners-up advanced to the second qualifying round. Germany had a bye to the second round.

Teams in italics hosted the mini-tournament. All match times listed are CET.

==== Group 1 ====
Team	Pld	W	D	L	GF	GA	GD	Pts
Finland	3	2	1	0	9	0	+9	7
Norway	3	1	2	0	11	3	+8	5
Serbia	3	0	2	1	4	5	−1	2
Kazakhstan	3	0	1	2	1	17	−16	1

25 September 2010
11:00

Finland	8–0	Kazakhstan
Honkanen 18', 30', 35'; Heroum 27'; Säppi 49'; Kemppi 53'; Hälinen 58'; Jaakonsaari 80+3'	Report

Harjun Stadion, Jyväskylä
Referee: Stéphanie Frappart (France)
25 September 2010
15:00

Norway	3–3	Serbia
Hansen 10'; Reiten 22'; Hegerberg 31'	Report	Pešić 13'; J. Damnjanović 18'; J. Ćubrilo 58'

Harjun Stadion, Jyväskylä
Referee: Irina Tereshchenko (Russia)

27 September 2010
11:00

Finland	1–0	Serbia
Kemppi 80+1'	Report

Vaajakoski
Referee: Stéphanie Frappart (France)
27 September 2010
15:00

Kazakhstan	0–8	Norway
	Report	Eide 7'; Nurusheva 21' (o.g.); Hegerberg 33', 37', 40' (pen.); Sandtrøen 36'; Tomter 44'; Haugstad 53'

Vaajakoski
Referee: Konstantina Mpoumpouri (Greece)

30 September 2010
15:00

Norway	0–0	Finland
	Report

Harjun Stadion, Jyväskylä
Referee: Irina Tereshchenko (Russia)
30 September 2010
15:00

Serbia	1–1	Kazakhstan
J. Damnjanović 80+5' (pen.)	Report	Pazyl 12'

Vaajakoski
Referee: Konstantina Mpoumpouri (Greece)

==== Group 2 ====
Team	Pld	W	D	L	GF	GA	GD	Pts
Czech Republic	3	3	0	0	13	0	+13	9
Republic of Ireland	3	2	0	1	5	2	+3	6
Northern Ireland	3	1	0	2	4	4	0	3
Macedonia	3	0	0	3	0	16	−16	0

16 October 2010
15:00

Czech Republic	8–0	Macedonia
Danihelková 4', 16'; Necidová 26'; A. Šturmova 37', 76'; E. Šturmová 46', 80', 80+3'	Report

Stangmore Park, Dungannon
Referee: Ruzanna Petrosyan (Armenia)
16 October 2010
20:30

Republic of Ireland	1–0	Northern Ireland
Jarrett 76'	Report

Shamrock Park, Portadown
Referee: Kadriye Gökcek (Turkey)

18 October 2010
14:00

Czech Republic	3–0	Northern Ireland
E. Šturmová 17'; A. Šturmova 24'; Danihelková 45'	Report

Seaview, Belfast
Referee: Evgenia Kaskantiri (Greece)
18 October 2010
19:00

Macedonia	0–4	Republic of Ireland
	Report	Newman 13'; Shine 19', 46'; McCabe 45'

Seaview, Belfast
Referee: Kadriye Gökcek (Turkey)

21 October 2010
14:30

Republic of Ireland	0–2	Czech Republic
	Report	Danihelková 54'; E. Šturmová 72'

Mourneview Park, Lurgan
21 October 2010
14:30

Northern Ireland	4–0	Macedonia
Magill 14', 26', 67'; Connolly 80+2'	Report

Shamrock Park, Portadown

==== Group 3 ====
Team	Pld	W	D	L	GF	GA	GD	Pts
Denmark	3	3	0	0	11	1	+10	9
Slovenia	3	2	0	1	3	4	−1	6
Hungary	3	1	0	2	8	5	+3	3
Moldova	3	0	0	3	1	13	−12	0

15 October 2010
15:30

Denmark	6–0	Moldova
Jans 5'; Knudsen 14'; Jensen 21'; Andersen 38'; Madsen 67'; Søgaard 80+1'	Report

Stadion Budai II. Laszló, Budapest
Referee: Natalya Nikolayeva (Kazakhstan)
15 October 2010
17:00

Hungary	1–2	Slovenia
Mosdóczi 58'	Report	Rupreht 76'; Begič 80+5'

Globall Football Park, Telki
Referee: Ginta Pece (Latvia)

17 October 2010
15:30

Denmark	3–0	Slovenia
Jensen 8'; Rask 22'; Andersen 52'	Report

Stadion Budai II. Laszló, Budapest
Referee: Justyna Zajac (Poland)
17 October 2010
17:00

Moldova	1–6	Hungary
Chiper 63'	Report	Bereczki 9' (pen.), 76'; Csiszár 12', 54'; Zeller 25', 41'

Globall Football Park, Telki
Referee: Natalya Nikolayeva (Kazakhstan)

20 October 2010
17:00

Hungary	1–2	Denmark
Mosdóczi 11'	Report	Jensen 27'; Andersen 40+2'

Globall Football Park, Telki
Referee: Ginta Pece (Latvia)
20 October 2010
17:00

Slovenia	1–0	Moldova
Eržen 23'	Report

Stadion Budai II. Laszló, Budapest
Referee: Justyna Zajac (Poland)

==== Group 4 ====
Team	Pld	W	D	L	GF	GA	GD	Pts
Spain	3	3	0	0	16	0	+16	9
Netherlands	3	2	0	1	17	1	+16	6
Belarus	3	1	0	2	2	5	−3	3
Georgia	3	0	0	3	0	29	−29	0

3 October 2010
17:00

Netherlands	3–0	Belarus
Coolen 27'; Janssen 53'; Drost 62'	Report

Sportpark Polder Albrandswaard, Poortugaal
Referee: Danijela Marković (Serbia)
3 October 2010
19:00

Spain	13–0	Georgia
Ortiz 8', 58', 72'; Valderas 11', 25', 34', 62', 64', 67'; Infante 20', 36'; De Castro 54'; Rodriguez 79'	Report

Sportpark Polder Albrandswaard, Poortugaal
Referee: Ivana Vlaić (Bosnia and Herzegovina)

5 October 2010
17:00

Spain	2–0	Belarus
De Castro 57'; Ortiz 73'	Report

Sportpark Polder Albrandswaard, Poortugaal
Referee: Eleni Lampadariou (Greece)
5 October 2010
19:00

Georgia	0–14	Netherlands
	Report	Moorrees 1'; Meinders 2', 7'; Kuijpers 4', 17', 40'; Kuikstra 5'; Mourmans 13', 50', 71', 72'; Braskamp 31'; Drost 58'; Becx 79'

Sportpark Polder Albrandswaard, Poortugaal
Attendance: 400
Referee: Ivana Vlaić (Bosnia and Herzegovina)

8 October 2010
19:00

Belarus	2–0	Georgia
Solokha 25'; Khryschenovich 40+2'	Report

Sportpark Polder Albrandswaard, Poortugaal
Referee: Eleni Lampadariou (Greece)
8 October 2010
19:00

Netherlands	0–1	Spain
	Report	De Castro 45'

Sportpark Polder Albrandswaard, Poortugaal
Referee: Danijela Marković (Serbia)

==== Group 5 ====
Team	Pld	W	D	L	GF	GA	GD	Pts
Iceland	3	3	0	0	29	1	+28	9
Italy	3	2	0	1	12	5	+7	6
Lithuania	3	1	0	2	1	21	−20	3
Bulgaria	3	0	0	3	0	15	−15	0

20 September 2010
15:00

Italy	4–0	Bulgaria
Roversi 3'; Giacinti 53', 73'; Re 80+1'	Report

Georgi Benkovski Stadium, Teteven
Referee: Mayte Porro Araico (Spain)
20 September 2010
15:00

Iceland	14–0	Lithuania
Lúdvíksdóttir 9', 30', 60' (pen.); Óladóttir 13', 16', 20'; Prastadrottir 26', 29'; Antonsdottir 43'; Viggosdottir 45', 52'; Einarsdottir 54'; Jensen 75'; Elvarsdottir 77'	Report

Pravets
Referee: Eszter Urban (Hungary)

22 September 2010
15:00

Italy	7–0	Lithuania
Giacinti 4', 8', 17'; Pugnali 10', 40+1'; Di Marino 33'; Vaičiulaitytė 61' (o.g.)	Report

Pravets
Referee: Mayte Porro Araico (Spain)
22 September 2010
15:00

Bulgaria	0–10	Iceland
	Report	Lúdvíksdóttir 4', 44'; Prastadrottir 9'; Abrahamsdottir 12'; Einarsdottir 24'; Óladóttir 58', 63', 75'; Antonsdottir 68', 80'

Georgi Benkovski Stadium, Teteven
Referee: Mihaela Gurdon Basimamovic (Croatia)

25 September 2010
15:00

Iceland	5–1	Italy
Lúdvíksdóttir 26' (pen.), 37', 56', 59'; Prastadrottir 44'	Report	Giacinti 39'

Pravets
Referee: Mihaela Gurdon Basimamovic (Croatia)
25 September 2010
15:00

Lithuania	1–0	Bulgaria
Vanagaitė 44'	Report

Georgi Benkovski Stadium, Teteven
Referee: Eszter Urban (Hungary)

==== Group 6 ====
Team	Pld	W	D	L	GF	GA	GD	Pts
Belgium	3	2	1	0	10	0	+10	7
England	3	2	1	0	9	0	+9	7
Turkey	3	1	0	2	7	5	+2	3
Armenia	3	0	0	3	0	21	−21	0

3 October 2010
17:00

Belgium	7–0	Armenia
Lerinckx 3'; Leynen 27', 47'; Neyens 31'; Deneve 52'; Aga 71' (pen.); Van Gorp 80+3'	Report

KMSK Deinze, Deinze
Referee: Cristina Bujor (Romania)
3 October 2010
19:30

England	2–0	Turkey
Gunton-Jones 27'; Williams 39'	Report

VC Eendracht Aalst, Aalst
Referee: Linn Wikström (Sweden)

5 October 2010
17:00

Armenia	0–7	England
	Report	Williams 28'; Lawley 31'; Merrick 36', 48', 53'; Mead 56', 77'

KMSK Deinze, Deinze
Referee: Cristina Bujor (Romania)
5 October 2010
19:30

Belgium	3–0	Turkey
Michez 11'; Leynen 40+1'; Van Gorp 80+5'	Report

Marcel De Kerpel Stadium, Wetteren
Referee: Giovanna Farinelli (Italy)

8 October 2010
16:00

Turkey	7–0	Armenia
Çınar 10', 59', 80'; Hız 12', 67'; Güngör 36'; Baştürk 48'	Report

Marcel De Kerpel Stadium, Wetteren
Referee: Giovanna Farinelli (Italy)
8 October 2010
16:00

England	0–0	Belgium
	Report

VC Eendracht Aalst, Aalst
Referee: Linn Wikström (Sweden)

==== Group 7 ====
Team	Pld	W	D	L	GF	GA	GD	Pts
Scotland	3	3	0	0	6	1	+5	9
Romania	3	1	1	1	2	1	+1	4
Austria	3	1	1	1	2	3	−1	4
Ukraine	3	0	0	3	0	5	−5	0

6 October 2010
11:00

Scotland	1–0	Romania
Weir 40'	Report

Lindabrunn, Lindabrunn
Referee: Marte Sørø (Norway)
6 October 2010
19:00

Ukraine	0–1	Austria
	Report	Dujmenović 69'

Wienerwaldstadion, Neulengbach
Referee: Irina Turovskaya (Belarus)

8 October 2010
11:00

Romania	2–0	Ukraine
Cosma 27', 64'	Report

Wienerwaldstadion, Neulengbach
Referee: Simona Ghisletta (Switzerland)
8 October 2010
15:00

Scotland	3–1	Austria
Weir 20' (pen.), 72'; Grant 24'	Report	Posch 40+1'

Lindabrunn, Lindabrunn
Referee: Marte Sørø (Norway)

11 October 2010
15:00

Ukraine	0–2	Scotland
	Report	Hunter 40', 72'

Lindabrunn, Lindabrunn
Referee: Simona Ghisletta (Switzerland)
11 October 2010
15:00

Austria	0–0	Romania
	Report

Wienerwaldstadion, Neulengbach
Referee: Irina Turovskaya (Belarus)

==== Group 8 ====
Team	Pld	W	D	L	GF	GA	GD	Pts
Sweden	3	3	0	0	8	2	+6	9
France	3	2	0	1	15	3	+12	6
Croatia	3	0	1	2	2	9	−7	1
Israel	3	0	1	2	2	13	−11	1

5 October 2010
14:30

Sweden	3–0	Croatia
Anker-Kofoed 41'; Stegius 58', 80+3'	Report

Municipal, St-Paul lès Dax
Referee: Justyna Zajac (Poland)
5 October 2010
14:30

France	9–0	Israel
Lavogez 3', 18', 36'; Vaysse 7'; Wenger 39', 51'; Bourgoing 57'; Gearain 66'; Belkacemi 68'	Report

Bourret, Capbreton
Referee: Lina Lehtovaara (Finland)

7 October 2010
14:30

Sweden	2–0	Israel
Stegius 5'; Diaz 67'	Report

Municipal, St-Paul lès Dax
Referee: Inna Didych (Ukraine)
7 October 2010
19:00

Croatia	0–4	France
	Report	Le Bihan 22'; Lavogez 25', 74'; Vaysse 31'

André Darriguade, Dax
Referee: Justyna Zajac (Poland)

10 October 2010
15:00

France	2–3	Sweden
Le Bihan 37'; Wenger 40'	Report	Stegius 7', 27', 74'

André Darriguade, Dax
Referee: Lina Lehtovaara (Finland)
10 October 2010
15:00

Israel	2–2	Croatia
Twil 25'; Bakal 79'	Report	Šalek 43', 56'

Bourret, Capbreton
Referee: Inna Didych (Ukraine)

==== Group 9 ====
Team	Pld	W	D	L	GF	GA	GD	Pts
Switzerland	3	3	0	0	13	0	+13	9
Poland	3	2	0	1	20	1	+19	6
Estonia	3	1	0	2	5	16	−11	3
Latvia	3	0	0	3	1	22	−21	0

14 October 2010
10:00

Poland	9–0	Estonia
Balcerzak 9'; Küppas 19' (o.g.); Sobkowicz 21', 73'; Nosalik 26'; Szaj 40+3'; Stodulska 60'; Bużan 62'; Silkowska 80+3'	Report

Salaspils BSS Stadium, Salaspils
Attendance: 30
Referee: Venera Kahric Muradova (Azerbaijan)
14 October 2010
14:00

Switzerland	6–0	Latvia
Sac 21'; Rochaix 47'; Fischer 55'; Bernet 59'; Ehrenbolger 70'; Calo 78'	Report

Salaspils BSS Stadium, Salaspils
Attendance: 75
Referee: Tanja Subotič (Slovenia)

16 October 2010
10:00

Switzerland	6–0	Estonia
Calo 6', 66'; Heule 26'; Wuichet 43', 76'; Sac 51'	Report

Salaspils BSS Stadium, Salaspils
Attendance: 50
Referee: Kamena Georgieva (Bulgaria)
16 October 2010
14:00

Latvia	0–11	Poland
	Report	Szaj 8', 26'; Balcerzak 21', 52' (pen.), 74'; Sobkowicz 33', 39'; Stodulska 42', 61', 65'; Guściora 62'

Salaspils BSS Stadium, Salaspils
Attendance: 55
Referee: Venera Muradova (Azerbaijan)

19 October 2010
14:00

Poland	0–1	Switzerland
	Report	Nosalik 3' (o.g.)

Ogre City Stadium, Ogre
Attendance: 25
Referee: Tanja Subotič (Slovenia)
19 October 2010
14:00

Estonia	5–1	Latvia
Ladva 2', 57', 64'; Lepik 23'; Toom 66'	Report	Zvonkova 80'

Salaspils BSS Stadium, Salaspils
Attendance: 35
Referee: Kamena Georgieva (Bulgaria)

==== Group 10 ====
Team	Pld	W	D	L	GF	GA	GD	Pts
Wales	3	2	1	0	10	3	+7	7
Russia	3	2	1	0	7	4	+3	7
Greece	3	1	0	2	8	8	0	3
Faroe Islands	3	0	0	3	1	11	−10	0

26 September 2010
10:00

Wales	4–0	Faroe Islands
Keryakoplis 6', 29', 47'; Green 34'	Report

Sputnik-Sport, Sochi
Referee: Kseniya Goryacheva (Russia)
26 September 2010
14:00

Russia	3–2	Greece
Piskunova 10'; Veselukha 53'; Kiskonen 66'	Report	Kollia 48'; Mitkou 60' (pen.)

Sputnik-Sport, Sochi
Referee: Marianne Svendsen (Denmark)

28 September 2010
10:00

Wales	4–1	Greece
Keryakoplis 14', 16', 55'; Curson 40+2'	Report	Kollia 34'

Sputnik-Sport, Sochi
Referee: Kseniya Goryacheva (Russia)
28 September 2010
14:00

Faroe Islands	0–2	Russia
	Report	Kiskonen 12'; Veselukha 29'

Sputnik-Sport, Sochi
Referee: Dimitrina Milkova (Bulgaria)

1 October 2010
14:00

Russia	2–2	Wales
Piskunova 8'; Veselukha 80+3' (pen.)	Report	Keryakoplis 13', 35'

Sputnik-Sport, Sochi
Referee: Marianne Svendsen (Denmark)
1 October 2010
14:00

Greece	5–1	Faroe Islands
Mouratidou 26'; Kollia 33'; Vardali 37'; Mitkou 54'; Papakosta 74'	Report	Johannesen 49'

Istochnik Stadium, Sochi
Referee: Dimitrina Milkova (Bulgaria)

=== Ranking of group runners-up ===
To determine the five best runners-up from the first qualifying round, only the results against the winners and third-placed teams in each group were taken into account and the following criteria apply:

1. higher number of points obtained in these matches
2. superior goal difference from these matches
3. higher number of goals scored in these matches
4. fair play conduct of the teams in all group matches in the first qualifying round
5. drawing of lots

The best runners-up were confirmed by UEFA on 22 October 2010.

Group	Team	Pld	W	D	L	GF	GA	GD	Pts
6	England	2	1	1	0	2	0	+2	4
10	Russia	2	1	1	0	5	4	+1	4
9	Poland	2	1	0	1	9	1	+8	3
5	Italy	2	1	0	1	8	5	+3	3
8	France	2	1	0	1	6	3	+3	3
4	Netherlands	2	1	0	1	3	1	+2	3
2	Republic of Ireland	2	1	0	1	1	2	−1	3
3	Slovenia	2	1	0	1	2	4	−2	3
1	Norway	2	0	2	0	3	3	0	2
7	Romania	2	0	1	1	0	1	−1	1

=== Second qualifying round ===
The ten group winners and the five best runners-up joined Germany in the second round. There were four groups of four teams each. The four group winners advanced to the final round. The draw was held on 16 November 2010.

==== Group 1 ====
Team	Pld	W	D	L	GF	GA	GD	Pts
Iceland	3	3	0	0	8	1	+7	9
Poland	3	2	0	1	5	4	+1	6
England	3	1	0	2	2	4	−2	3
Sweden	3	0	0	3	2	8	−6	0

9 Apr 2011
13:00 CET

Sweden	1–3	Poland
Johansson 13'	Report	Guściora 47' (pen.); Pajor 48'; Kaletka 71'

Pilkarski, Sosnowiec
Referee: Berta Maria Correia Tavares (Portugal)
9 Apr 2011
15:30 CET

Iceland	2–0	England
Óladóttir 46'; Jensen 80+2'	Report

Miejski, Jaworzno
Referee: Nelli Stepanyan (Armenia)

11 Apr 2011
15:30 CET

Iceland	2–0	Poland
Óladóttir 55'; Thrastadróttir 68'	Report

Pilkarski, Sosnowiec
Referee: Berta Maria Correia Tavares (Portugal)
11 Apr 2011
15:30 CET

England	1–0	Sweden
Sigsworth 33'	Report

Miejski, Jaworzno
Referee: Elia Martinez (Spain)

14 Apr 2011
15:03 CET

Sweden	1–4	Iceland
Bragnum 33'	Report	Garðarsdóttir 14'; Óladóttir 35'; Lúdvíksdóttir 78', 80+1'

Pilkarski, Sosnowiec
Referee: Nelli Stepanyan (Armenia)
14 Apr 2011
15:30 CET

Poland	2–1	England
Pajor 35'; Sobkowicz 40'	Report	Kelsh 45'

Miejski, Jaworzno
Referee: Elia Martinez (Spain)

==== Group 2 ====
Team	Pld	W	D	L	GF	GA	GD	Pts
Spain	3	2	0	1	9	4	+5	6
Belgium	3	2	0	1	2	2	0	6
Czech Republic	3	1	1	1	4	3	+1	4
Italy	3	0	1	2	2	8	−6	1

9 Apr 2011
16:00 CET

Spain	2–0	Belgium
Pinel 71'; Leoz 80+1'	Report

Rokycany, Rokycany
Referee: Zuzana Kováčová (Slovakia)
9 Apr 2011
16:00 CET

Czech Republic	1–1	Italy
Di Martino 14' (o.g.)	Report	Tudisco 80+1'

Zruč, Zruč-Senec
Referee: Stéphanie Frappart (France)

11 Apr 2011
16:00 CET

Spain	6–1	Italy
Perez de Heredia 24', 45', 80+2'; Carreño 31'; Ivana 60'; Gili 72'	Report	Roversi 38'

Rokycany, Rokycany
Referee: Konstantina Mpoumpouri (Greece)
11 Apr 2011
16:00 CET

Belgium	1–0	Czech Republic
Mechez 13'	Report

Zruč, Zruč-Senec
Referee: Stéphanie Frappart (France)

14 Apr 2011
16:00 CET

Czech Republic	3–1	Spain
Krejčiříková 67'; Nováková 70'; Šturmová 77'	Report	Perez de Heredia 76'

Zruč, Zruč-Senec
Referee: Zuzana Kováčová (Slovakia)
14 Apr 2011
16:00 CET

Italy	0–1	Belgium
	Report	Hannecart 6'

Rokycany, Rokycany
Referee: Konstantina Mpoumpouri (Greece)

==== Group 3 ====
Team	Pld	W	D	L	GF	GA	GD	Pts
Germany	3	3	0	0	17	0	+17	9
Denmark	3	2	0	1	8	4	+4	6
Finland	3	1	0	2	3	8	−5	3
Russia	3	0	0	3	0	16	−16	0

21 Apr 2011
11:00 CET

Germany	5–0	Finland
Dallmann 6'; F. Dongus 19', 23', 49'; Petermann 80'	Report

Sport og Event Park Esbjerg, Esbjerg
Referee: Marte Sørø (Norway)
21 Apr 2011
13:30 CET

Denmark	5–0	Russia
Gewitz 7'; Andersen 34', 80+4'; Jans 46'; Fisker 80'	Report

Varde Idrætspark, Varde
Referee: Danijela Marković (Serbia)

23 Apr 2011
11:00 CET

Germany	9–0	Russia
Däbritz 3', 50', 53'; Petermann 7', 58' (pen.); Leupolz 47'; F. Dongus 63'; Magull 68' (pen.), 79'	Report

Sport og Event Park Esbjerg, Esbjerg
Referee: Leen Martens (Belgium)
23 Apr 2011
15:00 CET

Finland	1–3	Denmark
Saastamoinen 71'	Report	Fisker 10'; Andersen 62'; Smidt Nielsen 70'

Sport og Event Park Esbjerg, Esbjerg
Referee: Marte Sørø (Norway)

26 Apr 2011
15:00 CET

Denmark	0–3	Germany
	Report	F. Dongus 6', 57', 59'

Sport og Event Park Esbjerg, Esbjerg
Referee: Leen Martens (Belgium)
26 Apr 2011
15:00 CET

Russia	0–2	Finland
	Report	Saastamoinen 27'; Heroum 30'

Varde Idrætspark, Varde
Referee: Danijela Marković (Serbia)

==== Group 4 ====
Team	Pld	W	D	L	GF	GA	GD	Pts
France	3	3	0	0	8	1	+7	9
Scotland	3	1	1	1	5	5	0	4
Wales	3	0	2	1	2	4	−2	2
Switzerland	3	0	1	2	1	6	−5	1

9 Apr 2011
16:00 CET

Switzerland	1–1	Wales
Brülhart 68'	Report	Keryakoplis 74'

Sportanlage Heslibach, Küsnacht
Referee: Monika Mularczyk (Poland)
9 Apr 2011
16:00 CET

Scotland	1–4	France
Ness 60'	Report	Le Bihan 3', 80+2'; Lavogez 36', 64'

Chrummen, Freienbach
Referee: Linn Andersson (Sweden)

11 Apr 2011
18:30 CET

Switzerland	0–2	France
	Report	Lavogez 11', 50'

Chrummen, Freienbach
Referee: Natalia Aleksakhina (Ukraine)
11 Apr 2011
18:30 CET

Wales	1–1	Scotland
Keryakoplis 66'	Report	Brown 31'

Grünfeld, Rapperswil-Jona
Referee: Monika Mularczyk (Poland)

14 Apr 2011
18:30 CET

Scotland	3–0	Switzerland
Weir 13' (pen.), 34', 40+1'	Report

Grünfeld, Rapperswil-Jona
Referee: Linn Andersson (Sweden)
14 Apr 2011
18:30 CET

France	2–0	Wales
Declercq 16'; Diani 66'	Report

Sportanlage Heslibach, Küssnacht
Referee: Natalia Aleksakhina (Ukraine)

== Final round ==
2011 UEFA Women's Under-17 Championship teams and final round performance

The four group champions played the knockout stage in the Centre sportif de Colovray Nyon, Nyon, Switzerland from 28 to 31 July 2011. There were two semifinals, a third place match and the final. The pairings were determined by the regulations, there was no draw held for the finals.

Semi-finals
28 July 2011
Iceland	0
Spain	4
28 July 2011
Germany	2 (5)
France	2 (6)

Final
31 July 2011
Spain	1
France	0
Third place
31 July 2011
Iceland	2
Germany	8

=== Semifinals ===
28 July 2011
14:00

Iceland	0–4	Spain
	Report	García 12'; Putellas 34', 36'; Viggosdóttir 67' (o.g.)

Centre sportif de Colovray Nyon, Nyon
Referee: Simona Ghisletta (Switzerland)

28 July 2011
18:00

Germany	2–2 (a.e.t.)	France
Magull 8'; Jäger 68'	Report	Lavogez 49'; Belkacemi 60'
Penalties
Magull (penalty scored); Dallman (penalty missed); Seifert (penalty scored); Petermann (penalty scored); Däbritz (penalty scored); Bröckl (penalty scored); Jäger (penalty missed); Leupolz (penalty missed)	5–6	Lavogez (penalty missed); Belkacemi (penalty scored); Declercq (penalty scored); Kerrache (penalty scored); Huchet (penalty scored); Mbock Bathy Nka (penalty scored); Adram (penalty missed); Wenger (penalty scored)

Centre sportif de Colovray Nyon, Nyon
Referee: Konstantina Mpoumpouri (Greece)

=== Third place match ===
31 July 2011
14:00

Iceland	2–8	Germany
Thrastadróttir 48'; Lúdvíksdóttir 80'	Report	Däbritz 12'; Magull 14', 40+1', 47'; Jäger 26', 38', 67'; Leupolz 68'

Centre sportif de Colovray Nyon, Nyon
Referee: Konstantina Mpoumpouri (Greece)

=== Final ===
31 July 2011
18:00

Spain	1–0	France
Pomares 80+2'	Report

Centre sportif de Colovray Nyon, Nyon
Referee: Simona Ghisletta (Switzerland)

2011 UEFA Women's Under-17 European champions

Spain
Second title
