= Kadrić =

Kadrić is a surname. Notable people with the surname include:

- Amer Kadrić (born 1994), Bosnian-Herzegovinian footballer
- Esed Kadrić (born 1979), Bosnian politician
- Iris Kadrić (born 1994), Bosnian-Herzegovinian women's footballer
- Rialda Kadrić (1963–2021), actress
- Denis Kadrić (born 1995), famous Bosnian chess grandmaster
