= Ternana Women =

Italian women's football club

- Full name: Ternana Women S.p.A.
- Nicknames: I Rossoverdi (The Red and Greens)
- Founded: 2020; 6 years ago
- Ground: Stadio Moreno Gubbiotti
- Capacity: 800
- Owner: N21Holding
- Chairman: Stefano D'Alessandro
- Manager: Antonio Cincotta
- League: Serie A
- 2025–26: 10th out of 12
- Website: www.ternanawomen.com
Home colours	Away colours

Ternana Women, commonly referred to as Ternana, is an Italian professional women's football club based in Terni, Umbria and currently compete in the Serie A. Founded in 2020, it is the women's section of the professional football club Ternana Calcio.

== History ==
In 2020, Ternana established its own women's football team, starting in the Eccellenza championship and subsequently being reinstated in the Serie C championship to complete its roster for the 2020-2021 season.

Ahead of the 2022-2023 season, Ternana officially acquired the sporting title of Pink Sport Time, a team based in Bari, for participation in the Serie B championship. One of the key figures of the Apulian team's staff, Isabella Cardone, joined the Umbrian club as head of the women's sector, while Lorenzo Vergani was appointed head of the Rossoverde women's youth system. Finally, Fabio Melillo was appointed as the team's new coach, remaining with him for two seasons and coming close to promotion to Serie A, until his sudden death on 6 July 2024.

For the 2024-2025 season, the team was entrusted to the new coach Antonio Cincotta, who in his first year with the Fere led the team to victory in the Serie B championship with four days to spare, and therefore to the first promotion to the top flight in the club's history.

== Players ==
=== Current squad ===
Note: Flags indicate national team as defined under FIFA eligibility rules; some limited exceptions apply. Players may hold more than one non-FIFA nationality.

No.	Pos.	Nation	Player
1	GK	NED	Kelly Steen
2	DF	SLO	Kaja Eržen
4	DF	ITA	Eleonora Pacioni
5	DF	ITA	Laura Peruzzo
6	DF	ITA	Heden Corrado
7	FW	POR	Adriana Gomes
8	MF	ITA	Lucia Pastrenge
9	FW	DEN	Sofie Hornemann
10	FW	ESP	Paloma Lázaro
11	FW	ITA	Valeria Pirone
12	GK	ITA	Gloria Ciccioli
13	GK	ITA	Katia Ghioc
14	DF	ITA	Martina Toniolo
15	FW	USA	Courtney Strode

No.	Pos.	Nation	Player
16	MF	ITA	Claudia Ciccotti
17	FW	ITA	Camilla Labate
18	FW	ITA	Martina Gelmetti
19	DF	ITA	Francesca Quazzico
21	MF	ITA	Maria Grazia Petrara
22	MF	ITA	Sofia Testa
23	MF	ITA	Alice Regazzoli
24	DF	ITA	Marika Massimino
27	DF	ITA	Miriam Cecchini
28	MF	CHN	Lina Yang
29	FW	POR	Cintia Martins
33	MF	GER	Stephanie Breitner
35	FW	ITA	Rosanna Ventriglia
71	GK	ITA	Katja Schroffenegger

== Honours ==
- Serie B
  - Winners: 2024–25
