= 2021–22 Perth Glory FC (women) season =

14th season in existence of Perth Glory FC (women)

Perth Glory (women)
2021–22 season
- Chairman: Tony Sage
- Head Coach: Alex Epakis
- A-League Women: 5th
- A-League Women Finals: DNQ
- Top goalscorer: Cyera Hintzen (5)
- Highest home attendance: 830 vs. Brisbane Roar (4 December 2021); A-League Women
- Lowest home attendance: 84 vs. Wellington Phoenix (31 January 2022); A-League Women
- Average home league attendance: 411
- Biggest win: 2–0 vs. Melbourne Victory (A) (19 February 2022); A-League Women; 3–1 vs. Wellington Phoenix (A) (4 March 2022); A-League Women
- Biggest defeat: 0–4 vs. Sydney FC (A) (8 January 2022); A-League Women; 0–4 vs. Melbourne City (H) (13 February 2022); A-League Women
Home colours	Away colours

The 2021–22 season was Perth Glory Football Club (women)'s 14th season in the A-League Women. Coached by Alex Epakis, Perth Glory finished 5th in their A-League Women season.

== Players ==
=== First-team squad ===
Note: Flags indicate national team as defined under FIFA eligibility rules; some limited exceptions apply. Players may hold more than one non-FIFA nationality.

No.	Pos.	Nation	Player
1	GK	AUS	Morgan Aquino
2	DF	AUS	Sarah Carroll
3	DF	AUS	Kim Carroll
4	DF	AUS	Natasha Rigby
5	DF	IRL	Deborah-Anne De la Harpe
7	DF	NZL	Elizabeth Anton
8	MF	AUS	Hana Lowry
9	FW	AUS	Demi Koulizakis
10	FW	AUS	Susan Phonsongkham
11	FW	AUS	Lisa De Vanna
12	MF	AUS	Sofia Sakalis
13	MF	AUS	Sarah Cain

No.	Pos.	Nation	Player
15	FW	USA	Cyera Hintzen
17	FW	AUS	Abbey Green
18	MF	AUS	Sadie Lawrence
19	MF	AUS	Poppie Hooks
20	GK	AUS	Courtney Newbon
21	MF	AUS	Aideen Keane
22	DF	AUS	Claudia Mihocic
23	FW	AUS	Alana Jancevski
24	FW	ENG	Gemma Craine
26	DF	DEN	Mie Leth Karshøj
41	FW	AUS	Leena Khamis

== Transfers and contracts ==
=== Transfers in ===
No.	Position	Player	Transferred from	Type/fee	Date	Ref.
1	GK	Morgan Aquino	Brisbane Roar	Free transfer	20 May 2021	
23	FW	Alana Jancevski	Unattached	Free transfer	24 May 2021	
9	FW	Demi Koulizakis	Canberra United	Free transfer	28 May 2021	
22	DF	Claudia Mihocic	(Australia) FV Emerging	Free transfer	9 June 2021	
21	MF	Aideen Keane	Western Sydney Wanderers	Free transfer	10 June 2021	
3	DF	Kim Carroll	Brisbane Roar	Free transfer	15 June 2021	
10	FW	Susan Phonsongkham	Western Sydney Wanderers	Free transfer	22 June 2021	
20	GK	Courtney Newbon	Western Sydney Wanderers	Free transfer	20 July 2021	
12	MF	Sofia Sakalis	Melbourne City	Free transfer	21 July 2021	
13	MF	Sarah Cain	Melbourne City	Free transfer	21 July 2021	
18	MF	Sadie Lawrence	(Australia) Murdoch University Melville	Free transfer	15 September 2021	
15	FW	(United States) Cyera Hintzen	(Iceland) Valur	Free transfer	20 September 2021	
26	DF	(Denmark) Mie Leth Karshøj	(Sweden) Vittsjö	Free transfer	20 September 2021	
11	FW	Lisa De Vanna	Melbourne Victory	Free transfer	25 November 2021	
19	MF	Poppie Hooks	(Australia) Murdoch University Melville	Free transfer	2 December 2021	
41	FW	Leena Khamis	Unattached	Free transfer	14 January 2022	

=== Transfers out ===
No.	Position	Player	Transferred to	Type/fee	Date	Ref.
20	GK	Rebecca Bennett	(Australia) Perth SC	Free transfer	13 September 2021	
9	MF	(New Zealand) Malia Steinmetz	Western Sydney Wanderers	Free transfer	29 September 2021	
1	GK	(New Zealand) Lily Alfeld	Wellington Phoenix	Free transfer	15 October 2021	
10	MF	Lexie Moreno	Unattached	Free transfer	2 December 2021	
11	FW	Patricia Charalambous	Unattached	Free transfer	2 December 2021	
13	DF	Jamie-Lee Gale	Unattached	Free transfer	2 December 2021	
14	MF	Caitlin Doeglas	Unattached	Free transfer	2 December 2021	
17	FW	Marianna Tabain	Unattached	Free transfer	2 December 2021	
23	FW	Katarina Jukic	Unattached	Free transfer	2 December 2021	
12	MF	Sarah Morgan	Western Sydney Wanderers	Free transfer	3 December 2021	

=== Contract extensions ===
No.	Position	Player	Duration	Date	Ref.
4	DF	Natasha Rigby	1 year	14 April 2021	
6	DF	Tijan McKenna	1 year	14 April 2021	
8	MF	Hana Lowry	1 year	14 April 2021	
5	DF	(Republic of Ireland) Deborah-Anne De la Harpe	1 year	26 May 2021	
2	DF	Sarah Carroll	1 year	3 June 2021	
17	FW	Abbey Green	1 year	8 June 2021	
31	DF	Isabella Wallhead	1 year	8 June 2021	
24	FW	(England) Gemma Craine	1 year	28 June 2021	
7	DF	(New Zealand) Elizabeth Anton	1 year	6 August 2021	

== Competitions ==
=== Overall record ===
Competition	First match	Last match	Starting round	Final position	Record							
Competition	First match	Last match	Starting round	Final position	Pld	W	D	L	GF	GA	GD	Win %
A-League Women	4 December 2021	4 March 2022	Matchday 1	5th	14	7	3	4	20	23	−3	50.00
Total					14	7	3	4	20	23	−3	50.00

Source: Soccerway

=== A-League Women ===
==== League table ====
Pos	Team	Pld	W	D	L	GF	GA	GD	Pts	Qualification
1	Sydney FC	14	11	2	1	36	6	+30	35	Qualification to Finals series
2	Melbourne City	14	11	0	3	29	11	+18	33	Qualification to Finals series
3	Adelaide United	14	9	0	5	33	18	+15	27	Qualification to Finals series
4	Melbourne Victory (C)	14	7	3	4	26	22	+4	24	Qualification to Finals series
5	Perth Glory	14	7	3	4	20	23	−3	24	
6	Brisbane Roar	14	5	2	7	29	30	−1	17	
7	Canberra United	14	2	7	5	24	29	−5	13	
8	Newcastle Jets	14	2	4	8	15	30	−15	10	
9	Western Sydney Wanderers	14	1	4	9	7	27	−20	7	
10	Wellington Phoenix	14	2	1	11	13	36	−23	7	

Source: A-Leagues
Rules for classification: 1) points; 2) goal difference; 3) number of goals scored.
(C) Champions

==== Results summary ====
Overall								Home						Away					
Pld	W	D	L	GF	GA	GD	Pts	W	D	L	GF	GA	GD	W	D	L	GF	GA	GD
14	7	3	4	20	23	−3	24	4	1	2	8	10	−2	3	2	2	12	13	−1

Source: worldfootball.net

==== Results by round ====
Round	1	2	4	3	6	7	8	9	10	5	11	12	13	14
Ground	H	A	A	H	A	A	H	H	A	H	H	A	H	A
Result	W	W	L	D	L	D	W	W	D	W	L	W	L	W
Position	3	3	5	5	6	6	5	4	5	5	5	5	5	5
Points	3	6	6	7	7	8	11	14	15	18	18	21	21	24

Source: worldfootball.net
A = Away; H = Home; B = Bye; W = Win; D = Draw; L = Loss

==== Matches ====
The first four rounds of the league fixtures were announced on 23 September 2021. The rest were announced on 9 November 2021.

Win Draw Loss

4 December 2021 1	Perth Glory	2–1	Brisbane Roar	Perth
19:05 AWST	Phonsongkham 88'; Worth 90' (o.g.)	Report	Margraf 22'	Stadium: Macedonia Park; Attendance: 830; Referee: Rebecca Durcau

10 December 2021 2	Brisbane Roar	0–1	Perth Glory	Brisbane
18:45 AEST			Jancevski 86'	Stadium: Perry Park; Attendance: 2,239; Referee: Rachael Mitchenson
Note: Match originally set to play at Gold Coast Croatian Sports Centre, but relocated due to heavy rainfalls across South East Queensland. It was relocated to Perry Park.

1 January 2022 4	Adelaide United	4–2	Perth Glory	Adelaide
16:35 ACDT	Dawber 33', 47'; McNamara 77'; Condon 81'	Report	Hintzen 41'; Jancevski 53' (pen.)	Stadium: Coopers Stadium; Attendance: 1,660; Referee: Rebecca Mackie
Note: Match originally scheduled for 23 December, but rescheduled due to border restrictions affected by the COVID-19 pandemic in Western Australia. It was rescheduled for 1 January.

5 January 2022 3	Perth Glory	0–0	Canberra United	Sydney
17:05 AEDT		Report		Stadium: Wanderers Football Park; Attendance: 106; Referee: Georgia Ghirardello
Note: Match originally scheduled for 18 December, but postponed due to border restrictions affected by the COVID-19 pandemic in Western Australia. It was rescheduled for 5 January.

8 January 2022 6	Sydney FC	4–0	Perth Glory	Sydney
17:05 AEDT	Hawkesby 11'; Vine 17'; Siemsen 25'; Rue 49'	Report		Stadium: Netstrata Jubilee Stadium; Attendance: 350; Referee: Casey Reibelt
Note: Match originally set to take place at Leichhardt Oval, but relocated to Netstrata Jubilee Stadium.

16 January 2022 7	Newcastle Jets	1–1	Perth Glory	Newcastle
18:45 AEDT	Eddy 77'	Report	Lowry 54'	Stadium: No.2 Sportsground; Attendance: 713; Referee: Caitlin Williams

23 January 2022 8	Perth Glory	1–0	Western Sydney Wanderers	Gosford
18:45 AEDT	De la Harpe 49'	Report		Stadium: Central Coast Stadium; Attendance: 493; Referee: Rebecca Mackie

31 January 2022 9	Perth Glory	3–2	Wellington Phoenix	Sydney
18:35 AEDT	Sakalis 14'; Hintzen 81'; Leth Karshøj 88'	Report	Jale 20'; Knott 39'	Stadium: Wanderers Football Park; Attendance: 84; Referee: Rachael Mitchenson
Note: Match originally scheduled for 29 January, but rescheduled for 31 January.

5 February 2022 10	Canberra United	3–3	Perth Glory	Canberra
17:05 AEDT	Maher 6' (pen.); Washington 79'; Keir 84'	Report	Hintzen 44', 70'; Anton 64'	Stadium: Viking Park; Attendance: 1,125; Referee: Isabella Blaess

10 February 2022 5	Perth Glory	1–0	Adelaide United	Gosford
17:05 AEDT	Leth Karshøj 6'	Report		Stadium: Central Coast Stadium; Attendance: 308; Referee: Georgia Ghirardello
Note: Match originally scheduled for 2 January, but rescheduled due to border restrictions affected by the COVID-19 pandemic in Western Australia. It was rescheduled for 2 March at Macedonia Park. Match then rescheduled for 10 February at Central Coast Stadium.

13 February 2022 11	Perth Glory	0–4	Melbourne City	Gosford
15:05 AEDT		Report	Pollicina 48'; McNamara 61', 88'; Wilkinson 90+4'	Stadium: Central Coast Stadium; Attendance: 362; Referee: Lara Lee
Note: Match originally scheduled for 11 February, but rescheduled for 13 February.

19 February 2022 12	Melbourne Victory	0–2	Perth Glory	Melbourne
16:50 AEDT		Report	Withers 69' (o.g.); Khamis 73'	Stadium: AAMI Park; Attendance: 1,243; Referee: Rebecca Mackie

27 February 2022 13	Perth Glory	1–3	Sydney FC	Launceston
16:05 AEDT	Keane 86'	Report	Tobin 34'; Vine 52', 60'	Stadium: UTAS Stadium; Attendance: 692; Referee: Rebecca Mackie

4 March 2022 14	Wellington Phoenix	1–3	Perth Glory	Wollongong
17:05 AEDT	Jale 86' (pen.)	Report	Gomez 23' (o.g.); Hintzen 61'; Keane 63'	Stadium: WIN Stadium; Attendance: 0 (behind closed doors); Referee: Rachael Mitchenson

== Statistics ==
=== Appearances and goals ===
Includes all competitions. Players with no appearances not included in the list.

No.	Pos	Nat	Player	Total		A-League Women	
No.	Pos	Nat	Player	Apps	Goals	Apps	Goals
1	GK	(Australia) AUS	Morgan Aquino	9	0	9	0
2	DF	(Australia) AUS	Sarah Carroll	4	0	4	0
3	DF	(Australia) AUS	Kim Carroll	14	0	14	0
4	DF	(Australia) AUS	Natasha Rigby	14	0	14	0
5	DF	(Republic of Ireland) IRL	Deborah-Anne De la Harpe	14	1	9+5	1
7	DF	(New Zealand) NZL	Elizabeth Anton	12	1	12	1
8	MF	(Australia) AUS	Hana Lowry	13	1	13	1
9	FW	(Australia) AUS	Demi Koulizakis	6	0	1+5	0
10	FW	(Australia) AUS	Susan Phongsongkham	9	1	6+3	1
11	FW	(Australia) AUS	Lisa De Vanna	13	0	6+7	0
12	MF	(Australia) AUS	Sofia Sakalis	13	1	9+4	1
13	MF	(Australia) AUS	Sarah Cain	14	0	6+8	0
15	FW	(United States) USA	Cyera Hintzen	9	5	8+1	5
17	FW	(Australia) AUS	Abbey Green	7	0	6+1	0
18	MF	(Australia) AUS	Sadie Lawrence	10	0	7+3	0
19	MF	(Australia) AUS	Poppie Hooks	4	0	2+2	0
20	GK	(Australia) AUS	Courtney Newbon	5	0	5	0
21	MF	(Australia) AUS	Aideen Keane	7	2	1+6	2
22	DF	(Australia) AUS	Claudia Mihocic	2	0	2	0
23	FW	(Australia) AUS	Alana Jancevski	7	2	3+4	2
24	FW	(England) ENG	Gemma Craine	7	0	5+2	0
26	DF	(Denmark) DEN	Mie Leth Karshøj	12	2	12	2
41	FW	(Australia) AUS	Leena Khamis	5	1	0+5	1

- Source: Soccerway

=== Disciplinary record ===
Includes all competitions. The list is sorted by squad number when total cards are equal. Players with no cards not included in the list.

No.	Pos	Nat	Player	Total			A-League Women		
No.	Pos	Nat	Player	Yellow card	Second yellow card	Red card	Yellow card	Second yellow card	Red card
10	FW	(Australia) AUS	Susan Phongsongkham	1	1	0	1	1	0
26	DF	(Denmark) DEN	Mie Leth Karshøj	3	0	0	3	0	0
5	DF	(Republic of Ireland) IRL	Deborah-Anne De la Harpe	2	0	0	2	0	0
15	FW	(United States) USA	Cyera Hintzen	2	0	0	2	0	0
18	MF	(Australia) AUS	Sadie Lawrence	2	0	0	2	0	0
21	MF	(Australia) AUS	Aideen Keane	2	0	0	2	0	0
23	FW	(Australia) AUS	Alana Jancevski	2	0	0	2	0	0
2	DF	(Australia) AUS	Sarah Carroll	1	0	0	1	0	0
4	DF	(Australia) AUS	Natasha Rigby	1	0	0	1	0	0
8	MF	(Australia) AUS	Hana Lowry	1	0	0	1	0	0
12	MF	(Australia) AUS	Sofia Sakalis	1	0	0	1	0	0
13	MF	(Australia) AUS	Sarah Cain	1	0	0	1	0	0

- Source: Soccerway
- (yellow card) = Number of bookings; (second yellow card) = Number of sending offs after a second yellow card; (red card) = Number of sending offs by a direct red card.
