= Zruč =

Zruč may refer to the following places in the Czech Republic:

- Zruč nad Sázavou, a town in Kutná Hora District, Central Bohemian Region
- Zruč-Senec, a village in Plzeň-North District, Plzeň Region
