= Gloria Ciccioli =

Italian footballer (born 2000)

Personal information
- Date of birth: 14 May 2000 (age 26)
- Position: Goalkeeper

Team information
- Current team: Ternana
- Number: 12

Senior career*
Years	Team	Apps	(Gls)
2016–2017	Jesina	5	(0)
2020–2021	San Marino	19	(0)
2021–2022	Empoli	5	(0)
2022–2024	Parma	13	(0)
2024–	Ternana		

International career
2017	Italy U19	1	(0)
- * Club domestic league appearances and goals

Gloria Ciccioli (born 14 May 2000) is an Italian professional footballer who plays as a goalkeeper for Serie A Femminile club Ternana.

== Career ==
Ciccioli started her career with Parma.
