= Stephanie Breitner =

German footballer

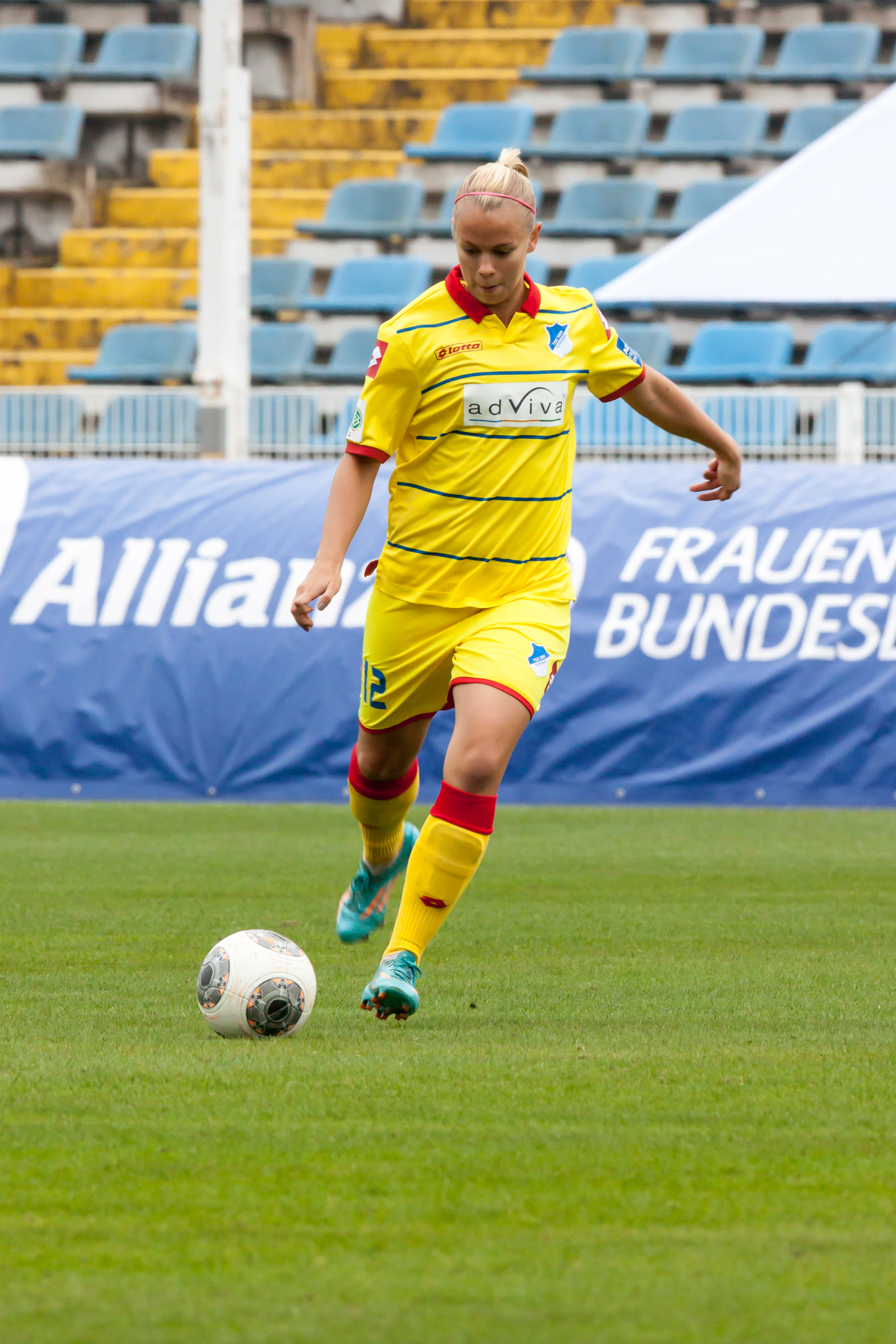

Personal information
- Date of birth: 25 September 1992 (age 34)
- Place of birth: Heidelberg, Germany
- Height: 1.71 m (5 ft 7 in)
- Position: Midfielder

Team information
- Current team: Ternana
- Number: 33

Youth career
- -2000: 1. FC Mühlhausen
- 2000-2007: VfB St. Leon
- 2007-2010: Hoffenheim

Senior career*
Years	Team	Apps	(Gls)
2009-2018	Hoffenheim	116	(8)
2018-2025	Fiorentina	104	(4)
2025	Napoli	8	(0)
2025-	Ternana	19	(1)
- * Club domestic league appearances and goals as of 17 May 2026

Stephanie Breitner (born 25 September 1992) is a German professional footballer who plays as a midfielder for Serie A club Ternana.

== Career ==
On 11 July 2025, Breitner joined Ternana Women.
