= Sarah Huchet =

French footballer (born 1994)

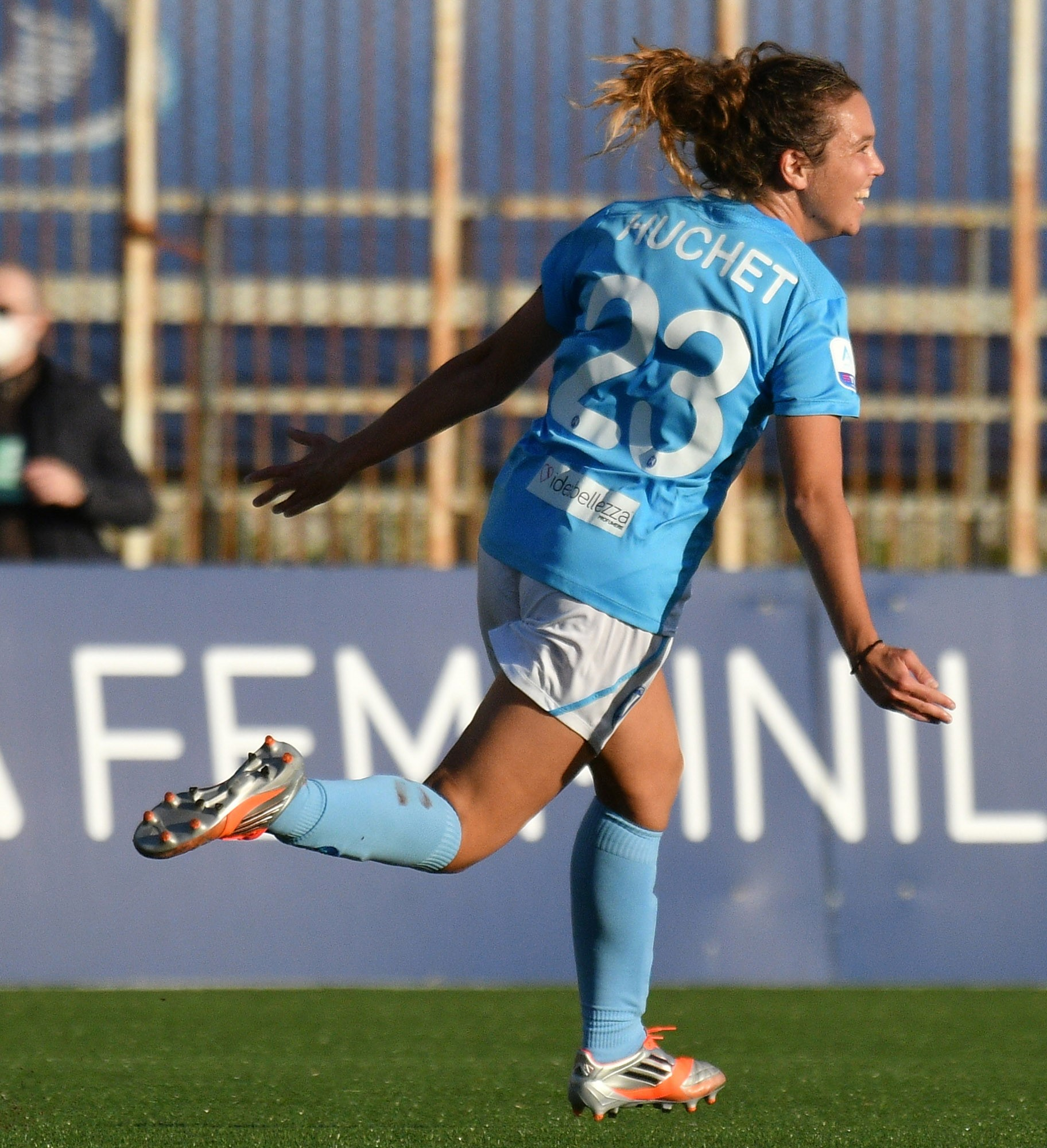

Personal information
- Full name: Sarah Anne Mary Huchet
- Date of birth: 14 May 1994 (age 32)
- Place of birth: Léhon, France
- Height: 1.65 m (5 ft 5 in)
- Position: Midfielder

College career
Years	Team	Apps	(Gls)
2013	Northwestern Ohio		

Senior career*
Years	Team	Apps	(Gls)
2009–2013	EA Guingamp	41	(0)
2014–2016	Issy	36	(7)
2016–2017	Dijon	6	(0)
2017–2020	Marseille	25	(8)
2020–2021	Napoli	18	(7)
2021–2023	Fiorentina	28	(1)
2023–2024	Sampdoria	8	(0)
2024	Racing Power		
2024	Cruz Azul	8	(2)
2026	Puebla	2	(0)
- * Club domestic league appearances and goals as of 2 February 2026

Sarah Huchet (born 4 May 1994) is a French footballer who plays as a midfielder.

== Career ==
On 29 July 2020, Huchet was announced at Napoli. She made her league debut against Fiorentina on 30 August 2020. Huchet scored her first league goal against Juventus on 5 December 2020, scoring in the 39th minute.

Huchet was announced at Fiorentina.

On 6 July 2024, Huchet was announced at Cruz Azul. She joined to make her mark on Mexican football like her idol, André-Pierre Gignac.

== International career ==
Huchet was part of the French squad that were runner up of the 2011 UEFA Women's Under-17 Championship.

== Personal life ==
Huchet has completed a study in law. She also has a M2 in sports law from Aix-Marseille University.
