= Katja Schroffenegger =

Italian footballer (born 1991)

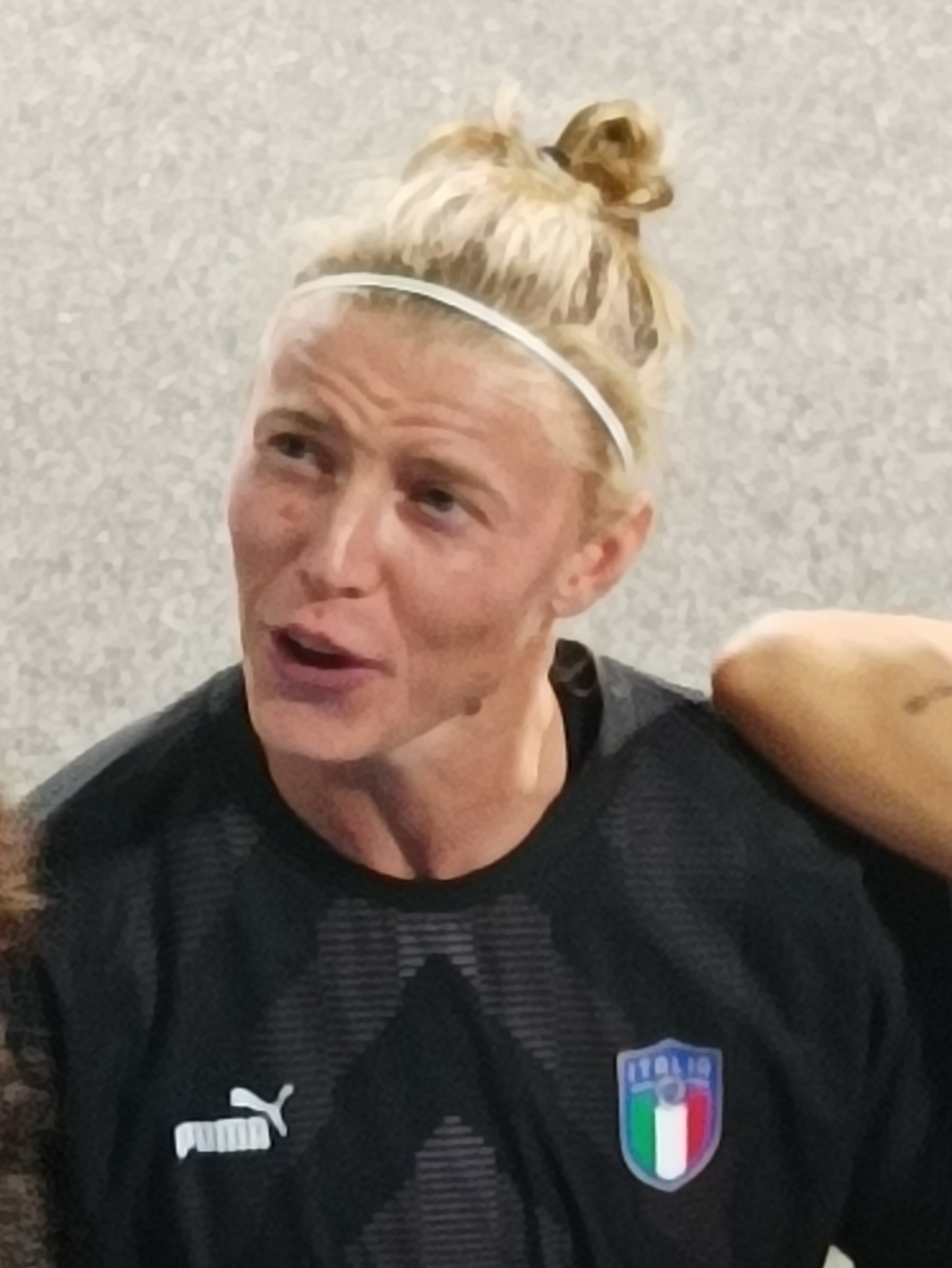
- Katja Schroffenegger (2022)

Personal information
- Date of birth: 28 April 1991 (age 35)
- Place of birth: Bolzano, Italy
- Height: 1.73 m (5 ft 8 in)
- Position: Goalkeeper

Team information
- Current team: Ternana
- Number: 71

Senior career*
Years	Team	Apps	(Gls)
2006–2009	Brixen	45+	(0)
2009–2011	Südtirol	47	(0)
2011–2013	Jena	17	(0)
2012–2013	Jena II	2	(0)
2013–2015	Bayern Munich	0	(0)
2013–2015	Bayern Munich II	7	(0)
2015–2016	Bayer 04 Leverkusen	0	(0)
2016	Südtirol Bozen	9	(0)
2016–2018	Unterland	29	(0)
2018–2019	Inter Milan	16	(0)
2019–2020	Florentia	9	(0)
2020–2024	Fiorentina	58	(0)
2024–2025	Como	1	(0)
2026–	Ternana		

International career
2011–	Italy	12	(0)
- * Club domestic league appearances and goals as of 28 August 2022

Katja Schroffenegger (born 28 April 1991) is an Italian professional footballer who plays as a goalkeeper for Serie A club Ternana and the Italy women's national team.

== Club career ==
She previously played for FC Südtirol in Serie A. On 19 June 2013, she signed with Bayern Munich.

== International career ==
In April 2011 she made her debut for the Italian national team. She is currently the national team's fourth choice goalkeeper.

Schroffenegger was called up to the Italy squad for the UEFA Women's Euro 2017.

On 26 June 2022, Schroffenegger was announced in the Italy squad for the UEFA Women's Euro 2022.
