= Iris Kadrić =

Bosnian association football player

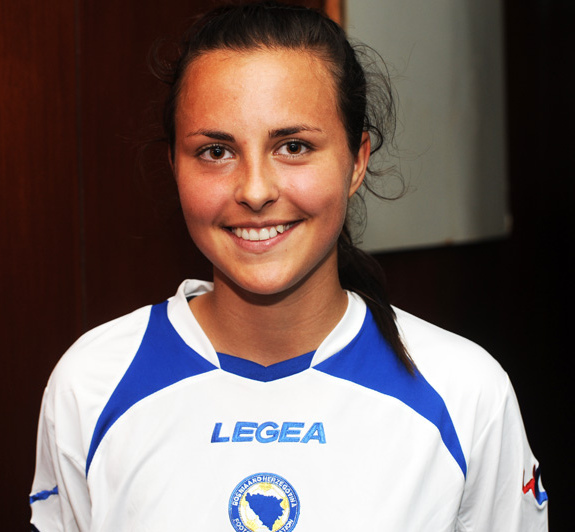
- Kadrić in 2013

Personal information
- Date of birth: 16 September 1994 (age 32)
- Place of birth: Borås, Sweden
- Position: Forward

Youth career
- IK Frisco
- Herrljunga

Senior career*
Years	Team	Apps	(Gls)
2010–2011	Falköpings KIK	35	(6)
2013	Vara SK	6	(1)
2013–2014	SFK 2000		
2014–2015	Skövde KIK	13	(10)

International career^{‡}
- Sweden U17
	Bosnia and Herzegovina U19	9	(3)
2013–2014	Bosnia and Herzegovina	4	(0)
- * Club domestic league appearances and goals as of 19 October 2018 ‡ National team caps and goals as of 19 October 2018

Iris Kadrić (born 16 September 1994) is a former footballer who played as a forward. Born in Sweden, she played four times for the Bosnia and Herzegovina women's national football team.

== Personal life ==
Kadrić was born in Borås, Sweden. Her parents were born in Sarajevo (then part of the Socialist Federal Republic of Yugoslavia, now Bosnia and Herzegovina), but moved to Sweden in 1992 due to the Bosnian War. As Kadrić has dual nationality, she was eligible to play for either Sweden or Bosnia and Herzegovina.

== Career ==
=== Club career ===
Aged 15, Kadrić signed for Falköpings KIK U17. She later played for the senior team. In 2011, Kadrić made 19 appearances for Falköpings KIK in the Swedish Division 1, scoring four goals. Kadrić also played for Swedish teams IK Frisco and Herrljunga. In the 2013–14 season, Kadrić played for Bosnia and Herzegovina Women's Premier League team SFK 2000, with whom she made three appearances in the 2013–14 UEFA Women's Champions League. For the 2015 season, she joined Swedish Division 1 team Skövde KIK. In June 2015, she injured herself whilst on international duty, and was out for an extended period of time.

=== International career ===
Kadrić played for Sweden U17 before deciding to switch her allegiance to Bosnia and Herzegovina to play for their U19 team. At the time she stated that she would still like to play for the Swedish senior team in the future. She played for Bosnia and Herzegovina U19 in the 2012 UEFA Women's U-19 Championship First qualifying round, scoring twice in a match against Moldova U19, and the 2013 UEFA Women's U-19 Championship First qualifying round, where she scored against Czech Republic U19. She was first called up to the Bosnia and Herzegovina women's national football team in July 2013. She made four appearances for the national team in the qualification event for the 2015 FIFA Women's World Cup, in matches against Scotland, Sweden, Northern Ireland, and the Faroe Islands.
