= Amer Kadrić =

Bosnian-Herzegovinian footballer

Personal information
- Full name: Amer Kadrić
- Date of birth: 12 October 1994 (age 32)
- Place of birth: Republic of Bosnia and Herzegovina
- Height: 1.73 m (5 ft 8 in)
- Position: Midfielder

Team information
- Current team: VfB Auerbach
- Number: 77

Youth career
- –2013: Bonner SC

Senior career*
Years	Team	Apps	(Gls)
2013–2016	Rot-Weiß Erfurt II	59	(17)
2014–2017	Rot-Weiß Erfurt	13	(1)
2016–2017	→ SC Wiedenbrück (loan)	5	(0)
2016–2017	→ SC Wiedenbrück II (loan)	17	(7)
2017–2020	VfB Auerbach	86	(7)
2020–2024	ZFC Meuselwitz	106	(8)
2024–	VfB Auerbach	57	(11)
- * Club domestic league appearances and goals as of 30 June 2026

Amer Kadrić (born 12 October 1994) is a Bosnian-Herzegovinian footballer who plays as a midfielder for VfB Auerbach.
