= Madeleine Stegius =

Swedish footballer

Personal information
- Date of birth: 19 June 1994 (age 32)
- Place of birth: Sweden
- Position: Forward

Team information
- Current team: Djurgården Futsal
- Number: 10

Youth career
- Boo FF

Senior career*
Years	Team	Apps	(Gls)
2011	Tyresö	3	(0)
2012–2017	Djurgården	134	(49)
2018–	AIK	25	(8)

International career
	Sweden U23	6	(2)
- * Club domestic league appearances and goals as of 7 September 2016

Madeleine Stegius (born 19 June 1994) is a Swedish futsal player who currently plays for Kick Off C5 Femminile Milano. Before she started to play futsal she was a professional football player and has played in Damallsvenskan for AIK Allmänna Idrottsklubben, Djurgårdens IF and Tyresö FF.

She has played for the Swedish National Under 23 Women's squad 6 times and scored 2 goals.

== Career ==
Stegius, born in 1994 in Nacka, started her career in the parent club Boo FF. At age 15 she trained with the star-studded Tyresö FF and a year later she wrote the contract with the club. The transition to Djurgårdens IF took place in 2012 and season 2015 will therefore be her fourth year in the blue stripes. The season 2014 came Stegius second in the goalscorers, five goals after teammate Mia Jalkerud, with 21 goals.

Stegius is one of Swedish football's most promising players and has played for the youth national teams since the age of 15. Recently she has played for the Swedish National Under 23 Women's squad 6 times and scored 2 goals.
