= Sigríður Lára Garðarsdóttir =

Icelandic footballer

Personal information
- Date of birth: 11 March 1994 (age 32)
- Place of birth: Iceland
- Position: Midfielder

Senior career*
Years	Team	Apps	(Gls)
2009–2018	ÍBV	145	(22)
2018	LSK	8	(1)
2019	ÍBV	18	(3)
2020	FH	16	(0)
2021	Valur	8	(2)
2021–2022	FH	29	(6)
Total		224	(34)

International career^{‡}
2010–2011	Iceland U17	14	(1)
2011–2013	Iceland U19	15	(4)
2015	Iceland U23	1	(0)
2016–2020	Iceland	20	(0)
- * Club domestic league appearances and goals as of 6 March 2023 ‡ National team caps and goals as of 6 March 2023

Sigríður Lára Garðarsdóttir (born 11 March 1994), often nicknamed "Sísí", is an Icelandic former footballer who played most of her career as a midfielder in the Úrvalsdeild kvenna, the top-tier women's football league in Iceland.

== Career ==
=== Club ===
Sigríður Lára senior career started in 2009 for ÍBV in the Icelandic second-tier 1. deild kvenna. Two years later, she played her first match in the top-tier Úrvalsdeild kvenna in 2011. During her ÍBV career, she recorded 145 league appearances, scoring 22 goals.

On 14 August 2018, with ÍBV in 5th place in the Úrvalsdeild, she was allowed to leave the club and sign with LSK of the Norwegian Toppserien. She returned to ÍBV in November 2018 after helping LSK win the Norwegian championship.

In 2019, she left ÍBV and signed a 2-year contract with Fimleikafélag Hafnarfjarðar. She left FH following its relegation from the Úrvalsdeild and signed with Valur in January 2021. She returned to FH in July 2021 after appearing in Valur's all eight league games, scoring two goals. In 2022, she appeared in 18 matches in the 1. deild kvenna for FH, scoring 2 goals. In March 2023, she announced her retirement from football due to arthritis.

=== International ===
Sigríður Lára represented Iceland at the 2011 UEFA Women's Under-17 Championship, where Iceland finished fourth. She also represented her country in the qualifyings for the 2012 UEFA Women's Under-19 Championship and 2013 UEFA Women's Under-19 Championship. In both occasions, Iceland failed to qualify. Sigríður Lára debuted for the Icelandic senior team on February 14, 2016, in a 1–1 tie against Poland. She also played for her country at the 2017 Algarve Cup. On June 22, 2017, Sigríður Lára was included by coach Freyr Alexandersson in the squad that represented Iceland at the UEFA Women's Euro 2017. She played two matches in the tournament, against France and Switzerland.

== Personal life ==
In January 2018, it was reported that Sigríður had been diagnosed with arthritis, at the age of 23, and would have to take medication for the rest of her life to keep the symptoms down.
