= Valentína Šušolová =

Slovak footballer

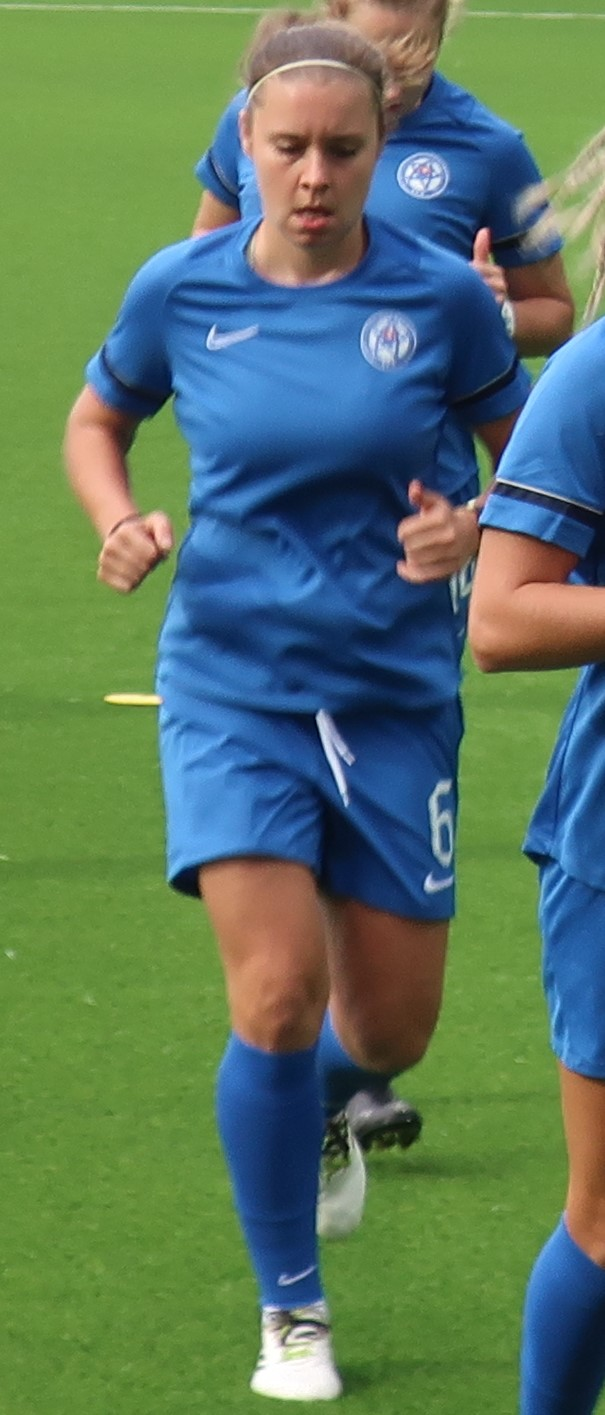

Personal information
- Date of birth: 1 November 1995 (age 31)
- Place of birth: Slovakia
- Height: 1.70 m (5 ft 7 in)
- Position: Midfielder

Team information
- Current team: FC Prague
- Number: 20

Senior career*
Years	Team	Apps	(Gls)
2015–2016	Slavia Prague	5	(0)
2016	Bohemians Prague	5	(0)
2016–2025	Slovan Liberec	138	(16)
2025–	FC Prague	2	(0)

International career^{‡}
	Slovakia	3	(0)
- * Club domestic league appearances and goals as of 28:28, 5 September 2025 (UTC) ‡ National team caps and goals as of 19:49, 30 August 2019 (UTC)

Valentína Šušolová (born 1 November 1995) is a Slovak footballer who plays as a midfielder for FC Prague and has appeared for the Slovakia women's national team.

== Career ==
Šušolová has been capped for the Slovakia national team, appearing for the team during the 2019 FIFA Women's World Cup qualifying cycle.
