= Guðmunda Brynja Óladóttir =

Icelandic footballer

Personal information
- Full name: Guðmunda Brynja Óladóttir
- Date of birth: 3 January 1994 (age 32)
- Place of birth: Iceland
- Position: Forward

Team information
- Current team: KR
- Number: 7

Senior career*
Years	Team	Apps	(Gls)
2009–2015	UMF Selfoss	122	(81)
2016	Klepp	6	(2)
2016	UMF Selfoss	7	(1)
2017–2018	Stjarnan	31	(11)
2019–	KR	32	(8)

International career^{‡}
2009–2011	Iceland U17	19	(13)
2010–2013	Iceland U19	19	(4)
2013–2017	Iceland	15	(1)
- * Club domestic league appearances and goals as of 01:00, 5 July 2022 (UTC) ‡ National team caps and goals as of 12:55, 1 January 2021 (UTC)

Guðmunda Brynja Óladóttir (born 3 January 1994) is an Icelandic footballer who plays as a forward for KR. She started her career with Selfoss. In 2013, she was named the Úrvalsdeild Young Player of the Year. She was the captain of the Selfoss team when it went to the Icelandic Cup final in 2015.

== National team career ==
Guðmunda debuted for the Icelandic national team in 2013.
