= Sofia Anker-Kofoed =

Swedish footballer

Personal information
- Full name: Sofia Ingrid Eleonora Anker-Kofoed
- Date of birth: 28 November 1994 (age 31)
- Place of birth: Ystad, Sweden
- Height: 5 ft 6 in (1.68 m)
- Position: Forward

Team information
- Current team: Washington State Cougars
- Number: 17

College career
| Years | Team | Apps | (Gls) |
| 2014– | Washington State Cougars | | |

Senior career*
| Years | Team | Apps | (Gls) |
| 2011–2014 | FC Rosengård | 13 | (2) |

International career^{‡}
| 2010 | Sweden U-17 | 5 | (1) |
| 2012 | Sweden U-19 | 5 | (2) |
- * Club domestic league appearances and goals as of 1 August 2015 ‡ National team caps and goals as of 15 January 2014

Sofia Anker-Kofoed (born 28 November 1994) is a Swedish footballer. She last played as an attacker for FC Rosengård in the Damallsvenskan.

== Club career ==
She plays for FC Rosengård since 2011, winning a Damallsvenskan titles in 2013 and a Super Cup in 2012.

== International career ==
She was part of the Sweden U-19 that won the 2012 UEFA Women's U-19 Championship.

== Honours ==
=== Club ===
FC Rosengård

Winner

- Damallsvenskan: 2013
- Super Cup: 2012

Runner-up

- Damallsvenskan: 2012

=== International ===
Winner

- UEFA Women's U-19 Championship: 2012
