= Evelin Mosdóczi =

Hungarian footballer

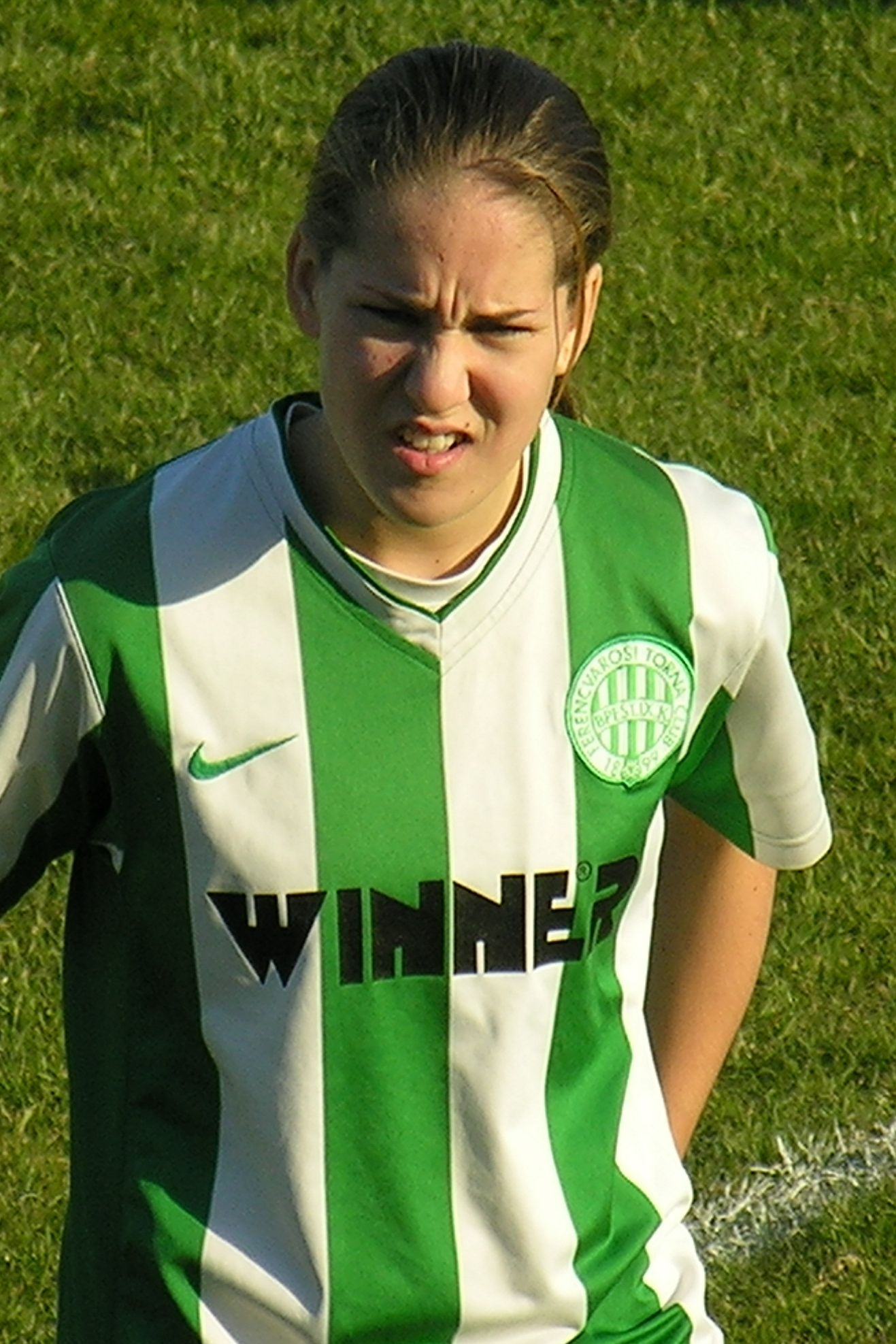
- Mosdóczi in 2011

Personal information
- Date of birth: 26 October 1994 (age 32)
- Position: Forward

International career^{‡}
Years	Team	Apps	(Gls)
2013–	Hungary	61	(4)
- ‡ National team caps and goals as of 1 December 2020

Evelin Mosdóczi (born 26 October 1994) is a Hungarian footballer who plays as a forward and has appeared for the Hungary women's national team.

== Career ==
Mosdóczi has been capped for the Hungary national team, appearing for the team during the 2019 FIFA Women's World Cup qualifying cycle.
