= Pamela Begič =

Slovenian footballer (born 1994)

Personal information
- Full name: Pamela Begič
- Date of birth: 12 October 1994 (age 32)
- Place of birth: Semič, Slovenia
- Height: 1.83 m (6 ft 0 in)
- Position: Midfielder

College career
Years	Team	Apps	(Gls)
2013–2016	Florida Gators		

Senior career*
Years	Team	Apps	(Gls)
2012	ŽNK Radomlje		
2018–2019	Empoli		
2019–2020	Apollon		
2020	Milan	3	(0)
2020–2021	Sporting de Huelva	6	(0)

International career
2009–2010	Slovenia U17		
2010–2012	Slovenia U19		
2011–2021	Slovenia		
- * Club domestic league appearances and goals as of 10 May 2020

Pamela Begič (born 12 October 1994) is a Slovenian former footballer who played as a midfielder for Spanish Primera División club Sporting de Huelva. She played for the Slovenia women's national football team from 2011, including during UEFA Women's Euro 2013 qualifying and UEFA Women's Euro 2017 qualifying.

== Career ==
As a freshman for the Florida Gators women's soccer team in 2013, she was named to the 2013 SEC All-Freshman team. She joined the Florida Gators women's basketball team in her freshman year. In her junior year, she switched to one sport to focus on soccer.

In October 2015, she declined to play for Slovenia in two UEFA Women's Euro 2017 qualifying matches due to the difficult travel and the upcoming SEC tournament.
