= Kaja Eržen =

Slovenian footballer (born 1994)

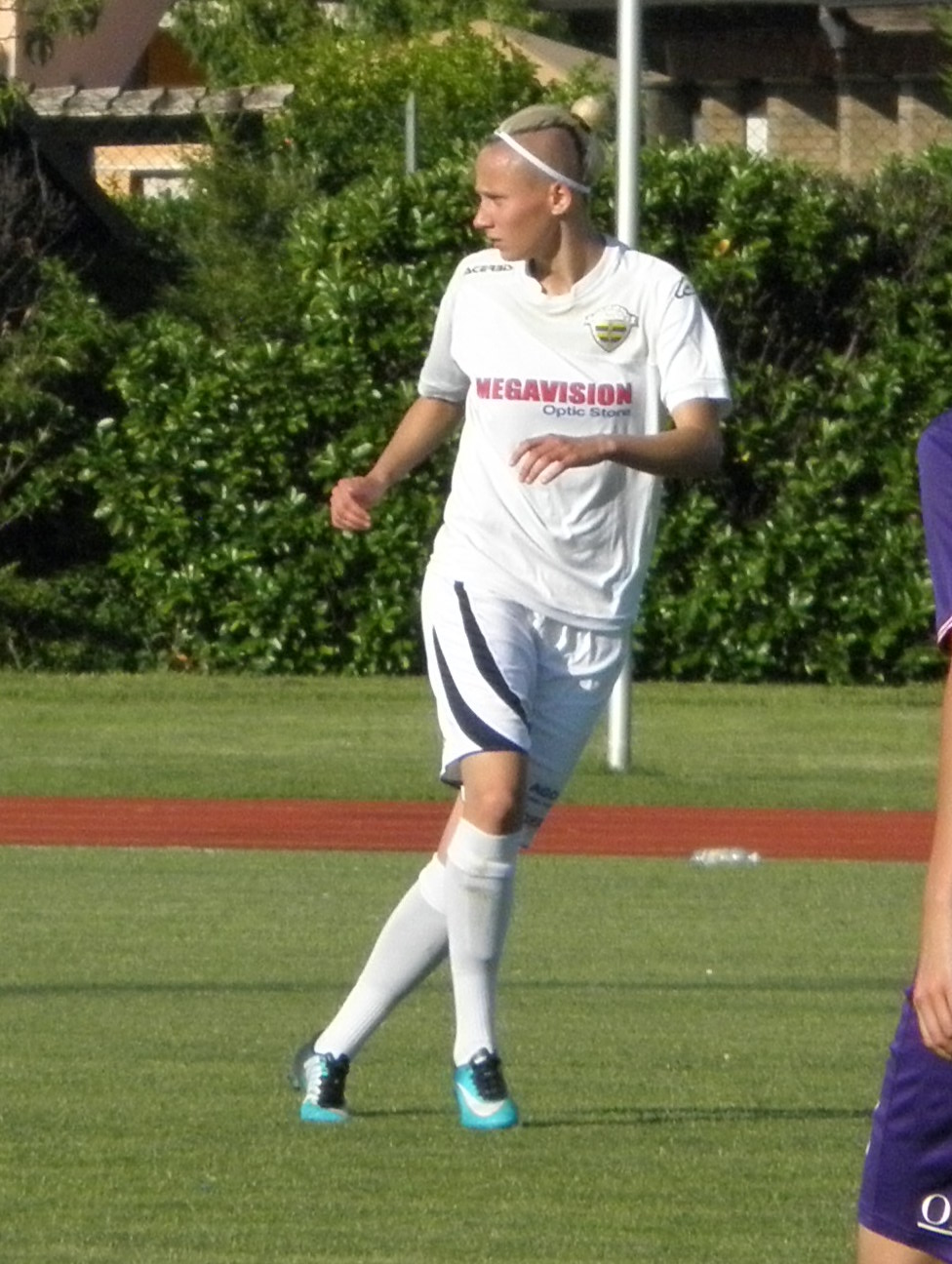
- Eržen playing for Tavagnacco in 2018

Personal information
- Date of birth: 21 August 1994 (age 32)
- Place of birth: Kranj, Slovenia
- Height: 1.76 m (5 ft 9 in)
- Positions: Right back; winger; striker

Team information
- Current team: Ternana
- Number: 22

Youth career
- 2008–2011: Velosovo
- 2011–2012: Pormuje

Senior career*
Years	Team	Apps	(Gls)
2012–2014	Pormuje		
2014–2015	Carinthians		
2015–2016	LUV Graz		
2016–2017	NK Olimpija Ljubljana		
2017–2019	Tavagnacco	44	(6)
2019–2021	Roma	26	(1)
2021–2022	Napoli	20	(1)
2022–2025	Fiorentina	63	(0)
2025–	Ternana	5	(0)

International career^{‡}
2012–	Slovenia	108	(4)
- * Club domestic league appearances and goals as of 17:22, 7 December 2025 (UTC) ‡ National team caps and goals as of 3 March 2026 (UTC)

Kaja Eržen (born 21 August 1994) is a Slovenian professional footballer who plays as a right back for Serie A club Ternana and the Slovenia women's national team. On 9 July 2021, it was announced that Erzen joined Napoli.

== Club career ==
Eržen began her career as a 14-year old midfielder with Slovenian club Velesovo in 2008. Eržen stayed with Velesovo for three seasons, helping the club achieve promotion to Slovenia's first division. Eržen then moved to Pomurje in the summer of 2011, where she began to score goals at a prolific rate. She won the Slovenian league and cup double as well as two consecutive league winner's medals during her stay with the Pormuje. After a run of games where Eržen scored 27 goals in 19 starts, she decided to move abroad to Austrian club Carinthians in 2014.

Eržen struggled to establish herself in her lone season at Carinthians and took up the offer to join compatriot coach Boris Ljubič, as well as seven fellow Slovenian teammates, at LUV Graz for the ÖFB-Frauenliga 2015–16 season. The team clinched seventh position in the league and saved themselves from relegation, before Eržen chose to return to her native Slovenia and sign with Olimpia Ljubljana for the 2016–17 season.

It was with Olimpia Ljubljana that Eržen rediscovered her goalscoring touch in attack, scoring 22 goals in 19 starts and ranking as the team's second-highest goalscorer for the season. Her attacking prowess caught the attention of Italian Serie A club Tavagnacco across the border, and Erzen signed for the Italian team in July 2017.

During her two seasons with Tavagnacco, Eržen played mostly as a winger and helped her side compete near the top of the Serie A table as well as reaching the Coppa Italia semi-final. During her second season with Tavagnacco, Eržen would score against Roma in a league match on 31 October 2018. Eržen's goals and performances from the wing captured the attention of Roma, who then signed the Slovenian in the summer of 2019.

During her stay with Roma, Eržen converted herself to a full-back role for the Giallorosse. She now plays that position for both club and country, and made an appearance in the 2021 Coppa Italia final for Roma. Roma won that Coppa Italia final in a penalty shootout victory over AC Milan, which saw Eržen become a part of Roma's club history as she helped the club achieve their first major trophy win on the women's side of the game.

== International career ==
Eržen has been capped for the Slovenia national team, appearing for the team during the 2019 FIFA Women's World Cup qualifying cycle.
