= Julie Trustrup Jensen =

Danish footballer (born 1994)

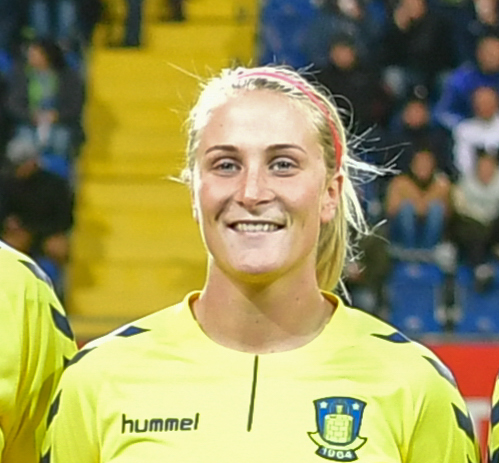

Personal information
- Date of birth: 6 April 1994 (age 32)
- Position: Midfielder

Senior career*
Years	Team	Apps	(Gls)
–2009	B73 Slagelse		
2009–2018	Brøndby IF	75	(11)
2018–2019	Vålerenga	1	(0)

International career^{‡}
2013–	Denmark	21	(0)
- * Club domestic league appearances and goals as of 12 April 2017 ‡ National team caps and goals as of 12 April 2017

Julie Trustrup Jensen (born 6 April 1994) is a Danish women's international footballer who plays as a midfielder for the Danish women's national team as well as for Vålerenga in the Norwegian Toppserien.

== Club career ==
Trustrup Jensen played for B73 Slagelse until 2009, when she joined Brøndby IF. Good form in season 2010–11 led to Trustrup Jensen being named Denmark's Young Player of the Year. She scored a goal in the 3–2 Danish Women's Cup final win over rivals Fortuna Hjørring. She quit football in 2014 to travel round the world, but soon came back to her career with Brøndby. In June 2015 she scored an injury time winning goal in the Cup final against Fortuna, as Brøndby won 2–1.

== International career ==
Trustrup Jensen's made her debut for the Denmark women's national football team in September 2013. She was a substitute for Brøndby team-mate Nanna Christiansen in the 53rd minute of a 4–0 friendly win over Hungary in Budapest. She was a part of the team for the 2016 Algarve Cup.
