= Claudia Ciccotti =

Italian footballer (born 1994)

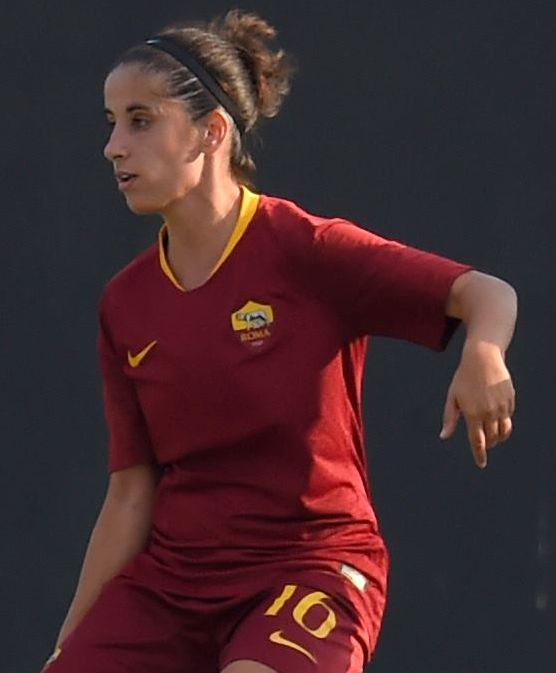
- Ciccotti in 2018

Personal information
- Date of birth: 9 February 1994 (age 32)
- Place of birth: Rome
- Height: 1.60 m (5 ft 3 in)
- Position: Midfielder

Team information
- Current team: Ternana Calcio
- Number: 16

Senior career*
Years	Team	Apps	(Gls)
2004–2010	Axa Calcio		
2010–2011	Totti Soccer School	16	(4)
2011–2012	Lazio CF	23	(0)
2012–2018	Res Roma	116	(8)
2018–2024	AS Roma	63	(4)
2024–	Ternana Calcio		

International career
2011–2013	Italy U19	12	(1)
2011–2012	Italy U20	2	(0)
2015–16	Italy U23	3	(0)
- * Club domestic league appearances and goals

Claudia Ciccotti (born 9 February 1994) is an Italian footballer who plays as a midfielder for the Italian club Ternana Calcio. She previously played for Res Roma and saw her playing rights transferred to AS Roma when the latter club took over Res Roma's Serie A license.

== Club career ==
Ciccotti began playing youth football with Axa Calcio (which later become Totti Soccer School) when she was ten years old. She joined inter-gender training sessions and made consistent progress with the academy through her teenage years. From 2008 to 2010, Ciccotti began to play for the Regional U-15 side of Lazio.

Ciccotti continued her playing career with Lazio through to the next 2010–2011 season, where she played for the Regional C Lazio team and helped them reach the competition final. In the following 2010–2011 season, Ciccotti made 16 appearances for Totti Soccer School in Serie C and helped her side win the Lazio Cup. In the following season of 2011–2012, Ciccotti made the jump to Serie A football with Lazio CF. She would go on to make 23 Serie A appearances (including 21 starts) in that season. Then Ciccotti joined Res Roma in the summer of 2012.

Ciccotti six-year journey with Res Roma began in the 2012–2013 season, alternating between playing senior football in Serie A2 and youth football with Res Roma Primavera. Ciccotti was a squad player at senior level, but her 11 senior appearances helped her new club win promotion to Italy's top division (Serie A) by the end of the season. By Ciccotti's second season with the club, her influence on the RES Roma began to grow.

By Ciccotti's third season with RES Roma, she was a first-team regular and reached 100 total career games. She also won a nomination as one of the Top 11 Italian youth players in the 2014–15 season. By Ciccotti's fifth season with Res Roma, she reached 100 total Serie A career games (23 with Lazio and 77 with Res Roma) but saw her game time restricted due to problems with recurring injuries. During Ciccotti's final season with Res Roma, the midfielder reached 100 league appearances with the club before Res Roma decided to sell their Serie A license to newly-formed club A.S. Roma, along with Ciccotti's playing rights.

Ciccotti's first season with A.S. Roma saw the midfielder make 17 league appearances and score 3 goals, but she faced more problems with injuries. One injury sustained in a Coppa Italia match kept Ciccotti out for seven straight games in all competitions, and she began to see less game time with her club.

Ciccotti's second season with A.S. Roma saw her serving as a backup player, collecting just 8 appearances but wearing the captain's armband for one game in the 2019–2020 season. Ciccotti's third season with A.S. Roma saw her make a comeback, becoming an influential player on the pitch once again and making 16 total appearances in all competitions. Her importance to the team was recognised by A.S. Roma on 26 March 2021, when Ciccotti signed a contract extension until 2023, She started two games as A.S. Roma captain on the day, and was a part of the Roma squad that went on to win the Coppa Italia after defeating AC Milan in the cup final on 30 May 2021.

== International career ==
Ciccotti made her debut for the Italy U-19 team in the 2011–2012 season. She made two appearances at U-19 level and made a further appearance for the Italy U-20 team in a friendly against Norway during the same season.

In the 2012–2013 season, Ciccotti scored a goal for the Italy U-19 team in a 1–1 EURO qualifying game against Greece. In the 2015–2016 season, Ciccotti played three friendly games as a central defender for the Italy U-23 team.

== Style of play ==
Ciccotti has been described as a jack of all trades, willing to use her intelligence and awareness of space to help her side. Ciccotti possesses a strong shot and finishing technique, making her a goalscoring threat around or inside the opponent's penalty area.
