= Zruč-Senec =

- Municipality
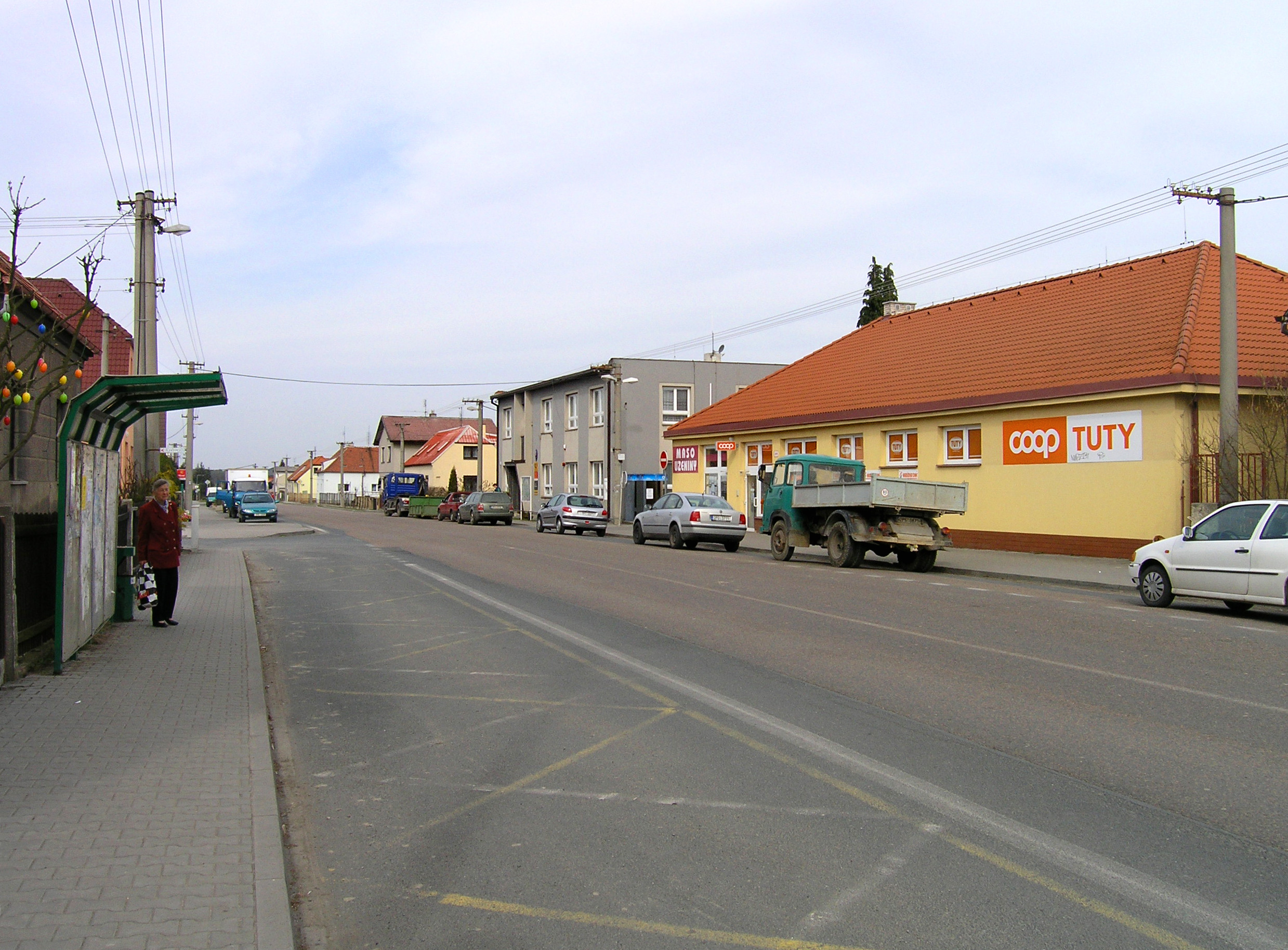
- Plzeňská street

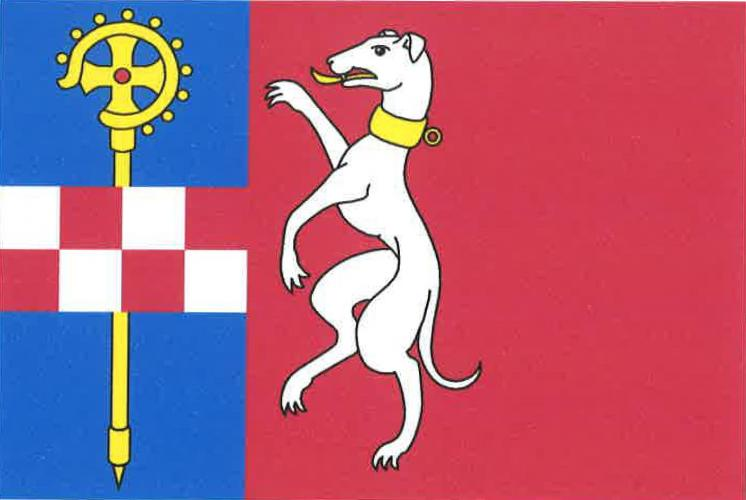
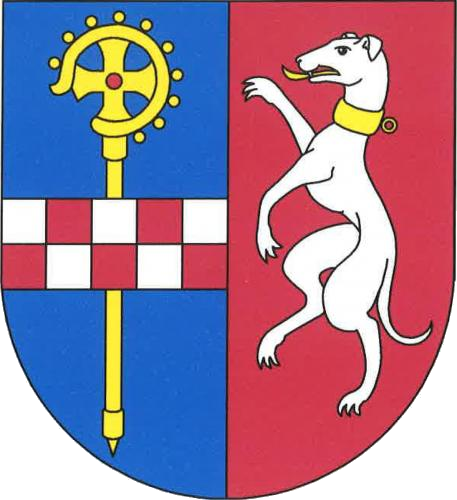
- Flag Coat of arms

- Location in the Czech Republic
- Coordinates: 49°48′28″N 13°25′35″E
- Country: Czech Republic
- Region: Plzeň
- District: Plzeň-North
- First mentioned: 1252

Area
  - Total: 8.87 km^{2} (3.42 sq mi)
- Elevation: 360 m (1,180 ft)

Population (2026-01-01)
  - Total: 3,522
  - Density: 397/km^{2} (1,030/sq mi)
- Time zone: UTC+1 (CET)
  - Summer (DST): UTC+2 (CEST)
- Postal code: 330 08
- Website: www.zruc-senec.cz

Zruč-Senec (Czech pronunciation: [ˈzrutʃ ˈsɛnɛts]) is a municipality in Plzeň-North District in the Plzeň Region of the Czech Republic. It has about 3,500 inhabitants.

== Administrative division ==
Zruč-Senec consists of two municipal parts (in brackets population according to the 2021 census):

- Zruč (1,824)
- Senec (1,627)

== Etymology ==
The origin of the name Zruč is uncertain. There is a theory that it was derived from the phrase z Rudče ('from Rudeč'), referring to the former village of Rudeč.

The name Senec was derived from the Czech words seno ('hay') and seník ('hayloft'), respectively from the adjective senný.

== Geography ==
Zruč-Senec is located about 5 kilometres (3 mi) north of Plzeň. It lies in the Plasy Uplands. The highest point is at 394 m (1,293 ft) above sea level. The Berounka River forms the southern municipal border. The fishpond Drahotínský rybník is located east of Zruč. The villages of Zruč and Senec are urbanistically fused.

== History ==
The first written mention of Zruč is from 1252, the first written mention of Senec is from 1295. Between 1517 and 1850, both villages were in the property of Plzeň.

Between 1869 and 1930, Senec and Zruč were two separate municipalities. In 1950–1991, Senec was a municipal part of Zruč municipality. In 1991, the municipality was renamed Zruč-Senec.

== Demographics ==
Historical population

Year	Pop.	±%
1869	503	—
1880	667	+32.6%
1890	849	+27.3%
1900	1,060	+24.9%
1910	1,116	+5.3%

Year	Pop.	±%
1921	1,090	−2.3%
1930	1,403	+28.7%
1950	1,638	+16.7%
1961	1,903	+16.2%
1970	1,991	+4.6%

Year	Pop.	±%
1980	2,105	+5.7%
1991	2,113	+0.4%
2001	2,363	+11.8%
2011	2,999	+26.9%
2021	3,451	+15.1%

Source: Censuses

== Transport ==
There are no railways or major roads passing through the municipality.

== Sights ==
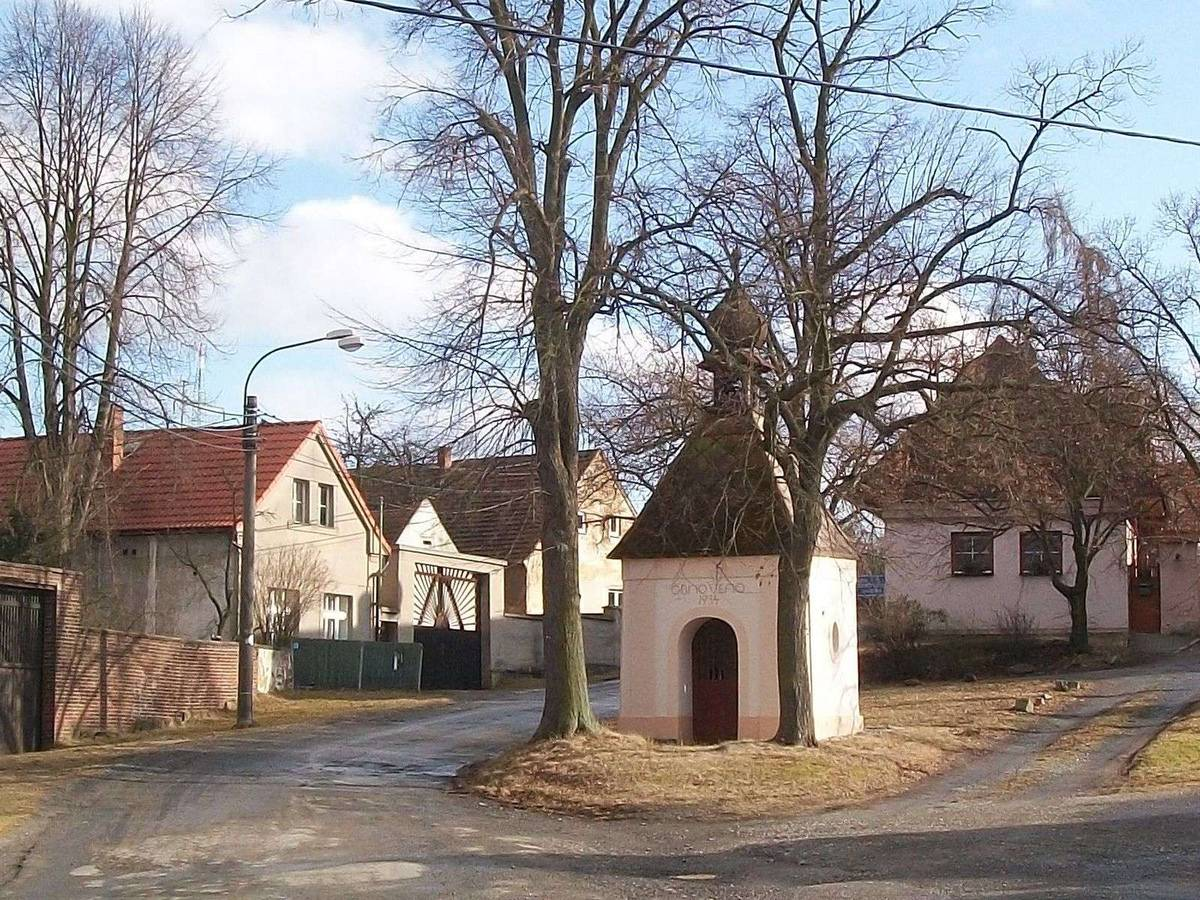
Chapel in Senec

Among the protected cultural monuments in the municipality are two small chapels (one in Zruč and one in Senec) and a column shrine in Zruč.

Zruč-Senec is known for the Air Park Zruč, which is a private collection of aircraft and military equipment. Exhibits are freely accessible to visitors.
