= Mie Leth Karshøj =

Danish footballer (born 1994)

Mie Leth Jans
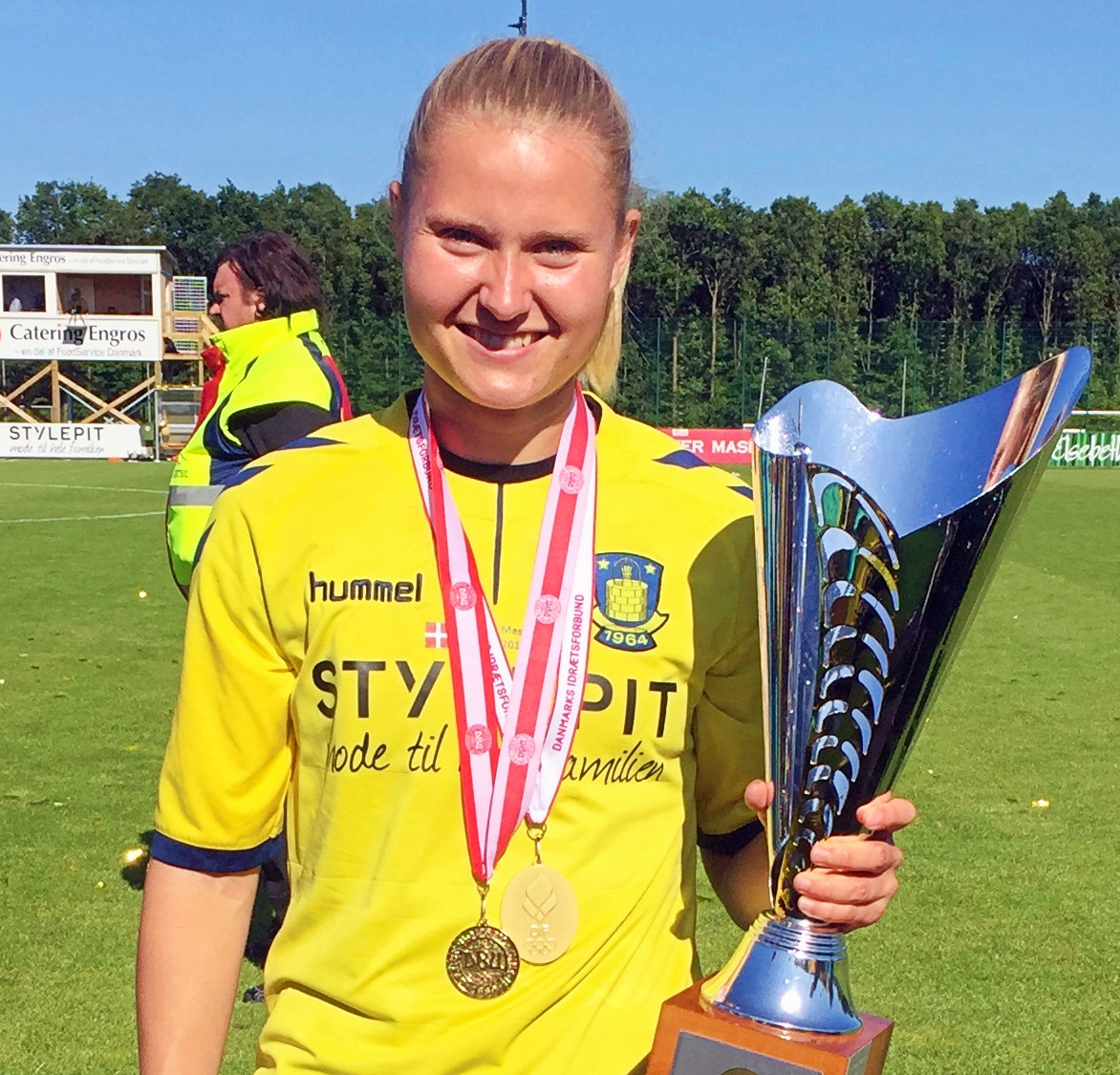
- Leth Jans at the 2017 League final

Personal information
- Full name: Mie Leth Jans
- Date of birth: 6 February 1994 (age 32)
- Place of birth: Dragør, Denmark
- Height: 1.71 m (5 ft 7 in)
- Position: Defender

Youth career
- Dragør Boldklub
- Taarnby Boldklub
- Brøndby IF

Senior career*
Years	Team	Apps	(Gls)
2012–2014	BSF	31	(5)
2014–2017	Brøndby IF	86	(10)
2017–2019	Manchester City	10	(0)
2019	FC Rosengård	6	(0)
2020–2022	Vittsjö GIK	37	(7)
2021–2022	Perth Glory	12	(2)
2022	Vittsjö GIK	9	(0)
2022–2024	HB Køge	38	(7)
2024–2025	Brøndby IF	18	(2)

International career^{‡}
2009	Denmark U-16	6	(0)
2009–11	Denmark U-17	12	(2)
2011–13	Denmark U-19	31	(5)
2016	Denmark U-23	1	(0)
2013–	Denmark	26	(0)
Medal record
Women's football
Representing Denmark
UEFA Women's Championship
Silver medal – second place	2017 Netherlands	Team
- * Club domestic league appearances and goals as of 14 August 2025 ‡ National team caps and goals as of 26 October 2017

Mie Leth Jans (born 6 February 1994) is a Danish football player who plays as defender for the Danish national team for which she debuted in 2013. Jans is currently a free agent.

== Club career ==
Leth Jans started her football career in Dragør Boldklub. She moved to Ballerup-Skovlunde Fodbold (BSF) in 2012. After two seasons playing in BSF's first team, she went back to her youth club Brøndby IF in June 2014. In June 2017, she signed a two-year contract with defending English champions Manchester City.

In January 2019 she moved to Swedish club FC Rosengård.

In September 2021, Leth Jans joined Australian W-League club Perth Glory.

== International career ==
Leth Jans made her debut for the Danish national team in November 2013. She came on as a substitute for future Brøndby IF teammate Nanna Christiansen in the 79th minute during a 2015 FIFA Women's World Cup qualifying game against Malta in Valletta. She was part of the Danish roster at the 2016 Algarve Cup and the UEFA Women's Euro 2017.
