= UEFA Women's Euro 2013 Group C =

Football tournament group stage

Group C of the UEFA Women's Euro 2013 consisted of England, France, Russia and Spain. Matches were staged in Linköping and Norrköping from 12 to 18 July 2013.

Spain returned to the tournament for the first time since its debut in 1997 after missing out the last three editions of the UEFA Women’s Championship in 2001, 2005 and 2009.

France won the group and advanced to the knockout stage along with group runners-up Spain. Russia finished in third place with an equal number of points as Group A's Denmark, but the Russian team was eliminated in a drawing of lots to determine which of the two teams would advance as one of the best third-placed teams. England finished bottom of the group and so was also eliminated from the tournament.

== Standings ==
Pos	Team	Pld	W	D	L	GF	GA	GD	Pts	Qualification
1	France	3	3	0	0	7	1	+6	9	Advance to knockout stage
2	Spain	3	1	1	1	4	4	0	4	Advance to knockout stage
3	Russia	3	0	2	1	3	5	−2	2	
4	England	3	0	1	2	3	7	−4	1	

Source: UEFA.com

== France vs Russia ==
12 July 2013
18:00

France	3–1	Russia
Delie 21', 33'; Le Sommer 67'	Report	Morozova 84'

Nya Parken, Norrköping
Attendance: 2,980
Referee: Jenny Palmqvist (Sweden)

France	Russia

FRANCE:
GK	16	Sarah Bouhaddi
RB	7	Corine Franco
CB	4	Laura Georges
CB	2	Wendie Renard
LB	3	Laure Boulleau
CM	8	Élise Bussaglia
CM	6	Sandrine Soubeyrand (c)	(substituted off) 76'
RW	9	Eugénie Le Sommer
AM	23	Camille Abily
LW	17	Gaëtane Thiney	(substituted off) 66'
CF	18	Marie-Laure Delie	(substituted off) 61'
Substitutions:
FW	12	Élodie Thomis	(substituted on) 61'
MF	14	Louisa Nécib	(substituted on) 66'
MF	13	Camille Catala	(substituted on) 76'
Manager:
Bruno Bini

RUSSIA:
GK	1	Elvira Todua
RB	5	Olga Petrova
CB	13	Alla Sidorovskaya
CB	19	Ksenia Tsybutovich (c)
LB	18	Elena Medved		(substituted off) 35'
CM	15	Anastasia Kostyukova	(yellow card) 23'
CM	8	Valentina Savchenkova		(substituted off) 35'
RW	10	Elena Terekhova
AM	20	Nelli Korovkina
LW	11	Ekaterina Sochneva
CF	23	Elena Morozova
Substitutions:
MF	9	Anastasia Pozdeeva		(substituted on) 35' (substituted off) 68'
DF	2	Yulia Gordeeva		(substituted on) 35'
MF	14	Tatyana Skotnikova	(yellow card) 90'	(substituted on) 68'
Manager:
Sergei Lavrentyev

Player of the Match:
Eugénie Le Sommer (France)

Assistant referees:
Helen Karo (Sweden)
Tonja Paavola (Finland)
Fourth official:
Esther Azzopardi (Malta)

== England vs Spain ==
12 July 2013
20:30

England	2–3	Spain
Aluko 8'; Bassett 89'	Report	Boquete 4'; Hermoso 85'; Putellas 90+4' (Note: Although UEFA credit the goal to Putellas, other sources including the British Broadcasting Corporation attribute it as an own goal by England goalkeeper Karen Bardsley. Putellas failed to connect with Adriana Martín's left wing cross but Bardsley diverted the ball in with her face. The BBC also credit the assist on the goal to Adriana.)

Arena Linköping, Linköping
Attendance: 5,190
Referee: Kateryna Monzul (Ukraine)

England	Spain

ENGLAND:
GK	1	Karen Bardsley
RB	2	Alex Scott
CB	15	Laura Bassett	(yellow card) 77'
CB	6	Casey Stoney (c)
LB	3	Steph Houghton
CM	4	Jill Scott
CM	8	Anita Asante
RW	7	Eniola Aluko		(substituted off) 72'
AM	10	Fara Williams
LW	11	Rachel Yankey		(substituted off) 90+1'
CF	9	Ellen White
Substitutions:
MF	14	Karen Carney		(substituted on) 72'
MF	12	Jessica Clarke		(substituted on) 90+1'
Manager:
Hope Powell

SPAIN:
GK	1	Ainhoa Tirapu
RB	18	Marta Torrejón
CB	20	Irene Paredes	(yellow card) 75'
CB	5	Ruth García
LB	17	Elixabet Ibarra
CM	15	Silvia Meseguer
CM	16	Nagore Calderón	(yellow card) 36'	(substituted off) 61'
RW	8	Sonia Bermúdez		(substituted off) 74'
LW	10	Adriana Martín
SS	21	Jennifer Hermoso
CF	9	Verónica Boquete (c)
Substitutions:
MF	14	Victoria Losada		(substituted on) 61'
MF	12	Alexia Putellas		(substituted on) 74'
Manager:
Ignacio Quereda

Player of the Match:
Jennifer Hermoso (Spain)

Assistant referees:
Natalia Rachynska (Ukraine)
Hege Steinlund (Norway)
Fourth official:
Monika Mularczyk (Poland)

== England vs Russia ==
15 July 2013
18:00

England	1–1	Russia
Duggan 90+2'	Report	Korovkina 38'

Arena Linköping, Linköping
Attendance: 3,629
Referee: Bibiana Steinhaus (Germany)

England	Russia

ENGLAND:
GK	1	Karen Bardsley
RB	2	Alex Scott (c)
CB	15	Laura Bassett
CB	6	Casey Stoney
LB	3	Steph Houghton		(substituted off) 64'
CM	8	Anita Asante
CM	4	Jill Scott
RW	7	Eniola Aluko		(substituted off) 78'
AM	10	Fara Williams	(yellow card) 55'
LW	11	Rachel Yankey		(substituted off) 17'
CF	9	Ellen White
Substitutions:
MF	14	Karen Carney		(substituted on) 17'
FW	17	Toni Duggan		(substituted on) 64'
FW	22	Kelly Smith		(substituted on) 78'
Manager:
Hope Powell

RUSSIA:
GK	1	Elvira Todua
RB	5	Olga Petrova
CB	13	Alla Sidorovskaya
CB	19	Ksenia Tsybutovich (c)
LB	18	Elena Medved
CM	15	Anastasia Kostyukova
CM	8	Valentina Savchenkova	(substituted off) 84'
RW	10	Elena Terekhova	(substituted off) 90+3'
AM	20	Nelli Korovkina	(substituted off) 89'
LW	11	Ekaterina Sochneva
CF	23	Elena Morozova
Substitutions:
MF	4	Maria Dyatchkova	(substituted on) 84'
FW	17	Natalia Shlyapina	(substituted on) 89'
FW	7	Olesya Kurochkina	(substituted on) 90+3'
Manager:
Sergei Lavrentyev

Player of the Match:
Valentina Savchenkova (Russia)

Assistant referees:
Marina Wozniak (Germany)
Lucie Ratajová (Czech Republic)
Fourth official:
Cristina Dorcioman (Romania)

== Spain vs France ==
15 July 2013
20:30

Spain	0–1	France
	Report	Renard 5'

Nya Parken, Norrköping
Attendance: 5,068
Referee: Carina Vitulano (Italy)

Spain	France

SPAIN:
GK	1	Ainhoa Tirapu
RB	18	Marta Torrejón
CB	6	Miriam Diéguez
CB	20	Irene Paredes
LB	17	Elixabet Ibarra
CM	11	Sandra Vilanova (c)	(substituted off) 85'
CM	15	Silvia Meseguer
RW	10	Adriana Martín	(substituted off) 78'
LW	8	Sonia Bermúdez	(substituted off) 78'
CF	21	Jennifer Hermoso
CF	9	Verónica Boquete
Substitutions:
MF	12	Alexia Putellas	(substituted on) 78'
MF	14	Victoria Losada	(substituted on) 78'
FW	19	Erika Vázquez	(substituted on) 85'
Manager:
Ignacio Quereda

FRANCE:
GK	16	Sarah Bouhaddi
RB	7	Corine Franco
CB	4	Laura Georges
CB	2	Wendie Renard
LB	3	Laure Boulleau
CM	8	Élise Bussaglia
CM	6	Sandrine Soubeyrand (c)	(substituted off) 46'
RW	23	Camille Abily
LW	17	Gaëtane Thiney
CF	14	Louisa Nécib	(substituted off) 63'
CF	18	Marie-Laure Delie
Substitutions:
FW	12	Élodie Thomis	(substituted on) 46'
FW	9	Eugénie Le Sommer	(substituted on) 63'
Manager:
Bruno Bini

Player of the Match:
Laura Georges (France)

Assistant referees:
Romina Santuari (Italy)
Hege Steinlund (Norway)
Fourth official:
Esther Staubli (Switzerland)

== France vs England ==
18 July 2013
20:30

France	3–0	England
Le Sommer 9'; Nécib 62'; Renard 64'	Report

Arena Linköping, Linköping
Attendance: 7,332
Referee: Kirsi Heikkinen (Finland)

France	England

FRANCE:
GK	1	Céline Deville
RB	7	Corine Franco
CB	22	Sabrina Delannoy
CB	2	Wendie Renard
LB	15	Jessica Houara
CM	10	Amandine Henry	(substituted off) 60'
CM	6	Sandrine Soubeyrand (c)	(substituted off) 46'
RW	12	Élodie Thomis
AM	17	Gaëtane Thiney	(substituted off) 46'
LW	14	Louisa Nécib
CF	9	Eugénie Le Sommer
Substitutions:
MF	8	Élise Bussaglia	(substituted on) 46'
MF	23	Camille Abily	(substituted on) 46'
MF	13	Camille Catala	(substituted on) 60'
Manager:
Bruno Bini

ENGLAND:
GK	1	Karen Bardsley
RB	2	Alex Scott
CB	5	Sophie Bradley
CB	6	Casey Stoney (c)
LB	3	Steph Houghton
CM	10	Fara Williams	(yellow card) 76'
CM	8	Anita Asante		(substituted off) 46'
RW	14	Karen Carney		(substituted off) 73'
LW	7	Eniola Aluko		(substituted off) 60'
CF	17	Toni Duggan
CF	9	Ellen White
Substitutions:
MF	4	Jill Scott		(substituted on) 46'
FW	22	Kelly Smith		(substituted on) 60'
MF	12	Jessica Clarke		(substituted on) 73'
Manager:
Hope Powell

Player of the Match:
Louisa Nécib (France)

Assistant referees:
Tonja Paavola (Finland)
Natalia Rachynska (Ukraine)
Fourth official:
Esther Azzopardi (Malta)

== Russia vs Spain ==
18 July 2013
20:30

Russia	1–1	Spain
Terekhova 44'	Report	Boquete 14'

Nya Parken, Norrköping
Attendance: 2,157
Referee: Jenny Palmqvist (Sweden)

Russia	Spain

RUSSIA:
GK	1	Elvira Todua
RB	5	Olga Petrova
CB	13	Alla Sidorovskaya
CB	19	Ksenia Tsybutovich (c)
LB	18	Elena Medved	(yellow card) 58'
CM	15	Anastasia Kostyukova		(substituted off) 34'
CM	8	Valentina Savchenkova
RW	10	Elena Terekhova
AM	20	Nelli Korovkina	(yellow card) 83'
LW	11	Ekaterina Sochneva		(substituted off) 58'
CF	23	Elena Morozova
Substitutions:
DF	22	Daria Makarenko		(substituted on) 34'
MF	6	Yulia Bessolova		(substituted on) 58'
Manager:
Sergei Lavrentyev

SPAIN:
GK	1	Ainhoa Tirapu
RB	18	Marta Torrejón
CB	5	Ruth García
CB	20	Irene Paredes
LB	17	Elixabet Ibarra
CM	15	Silvia Meseguer
CM	14	Victoria Losada	(substituted off) 64'
RW	10	Adriana Martín	(substituted off) 84'
LW	12	Alexia Putellas	(substituted off) 68'
SS	21	Jennifer Hermoso
CF	9	Verónica Boquete (c)
Substitutions:
MF	16	Nagore Calderón	(substituted on) 64'
FW	8	Sonia Bermúdez	(substituted on) 68'
FW	19	Erika Vázquez	(substituted on) 84'
Manager:
Ignacio Quereda

Player of the Match:
Verónica Boquete (Spain)

Assistant referees:
Helen Karo (Sweden)
Marina Wozniak (Germany)
Fourth official:
Monika Mularczyk (Poland)
