= List of people from Krasnoyarsk =

Coat of Arms of Krasnoyarsk

This is a list of notable people who were born or have lived in Krasnoyarsk, Russia.

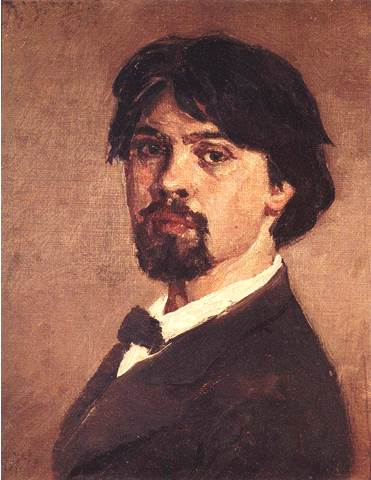
Vasily Surikov (1848–1916)

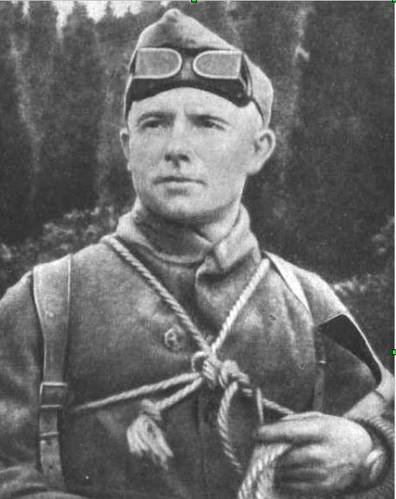
Yevgeniy Abalakov (1907–1948)

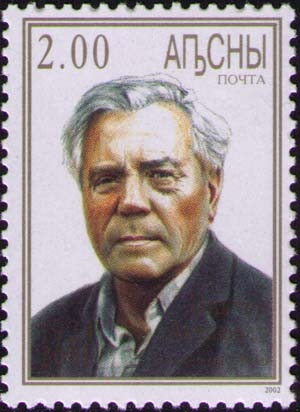
Viktor Astafyev (1924–2001)

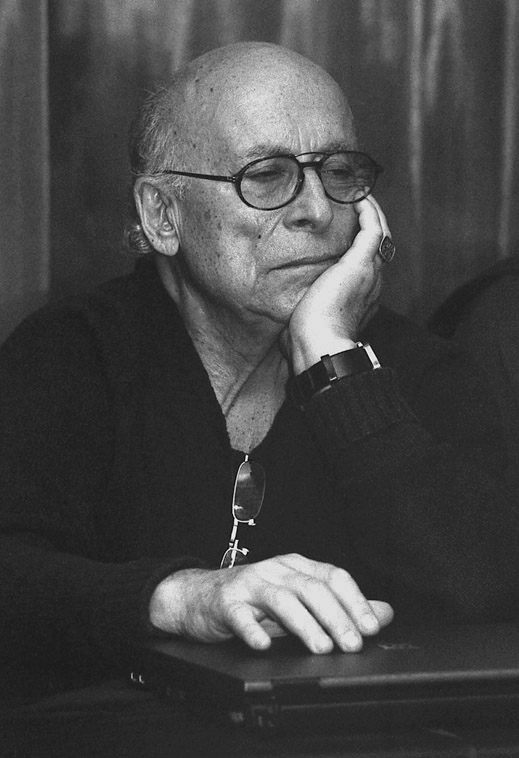
Yuz Aleshkovsky (1929–2022)

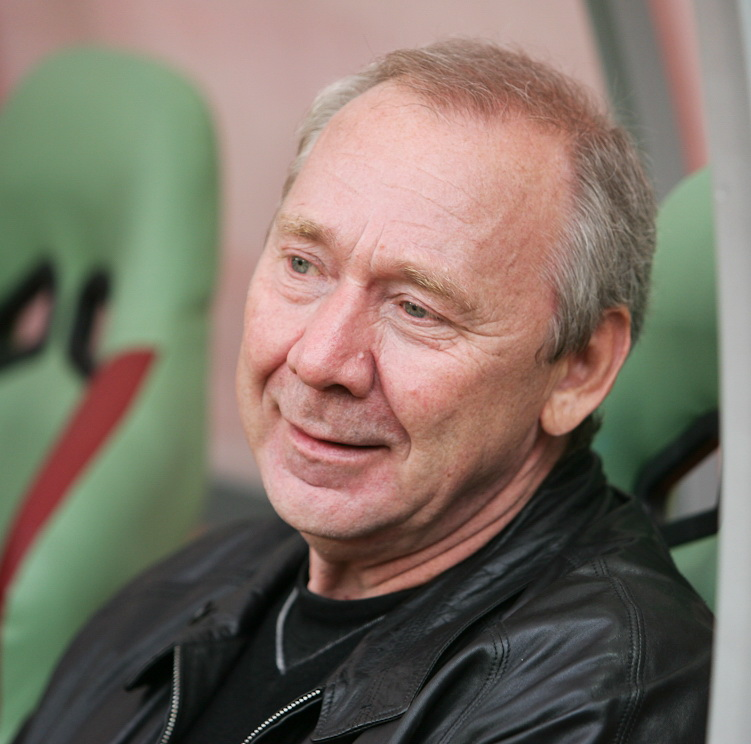
Oleg Romantsev (born 1954)

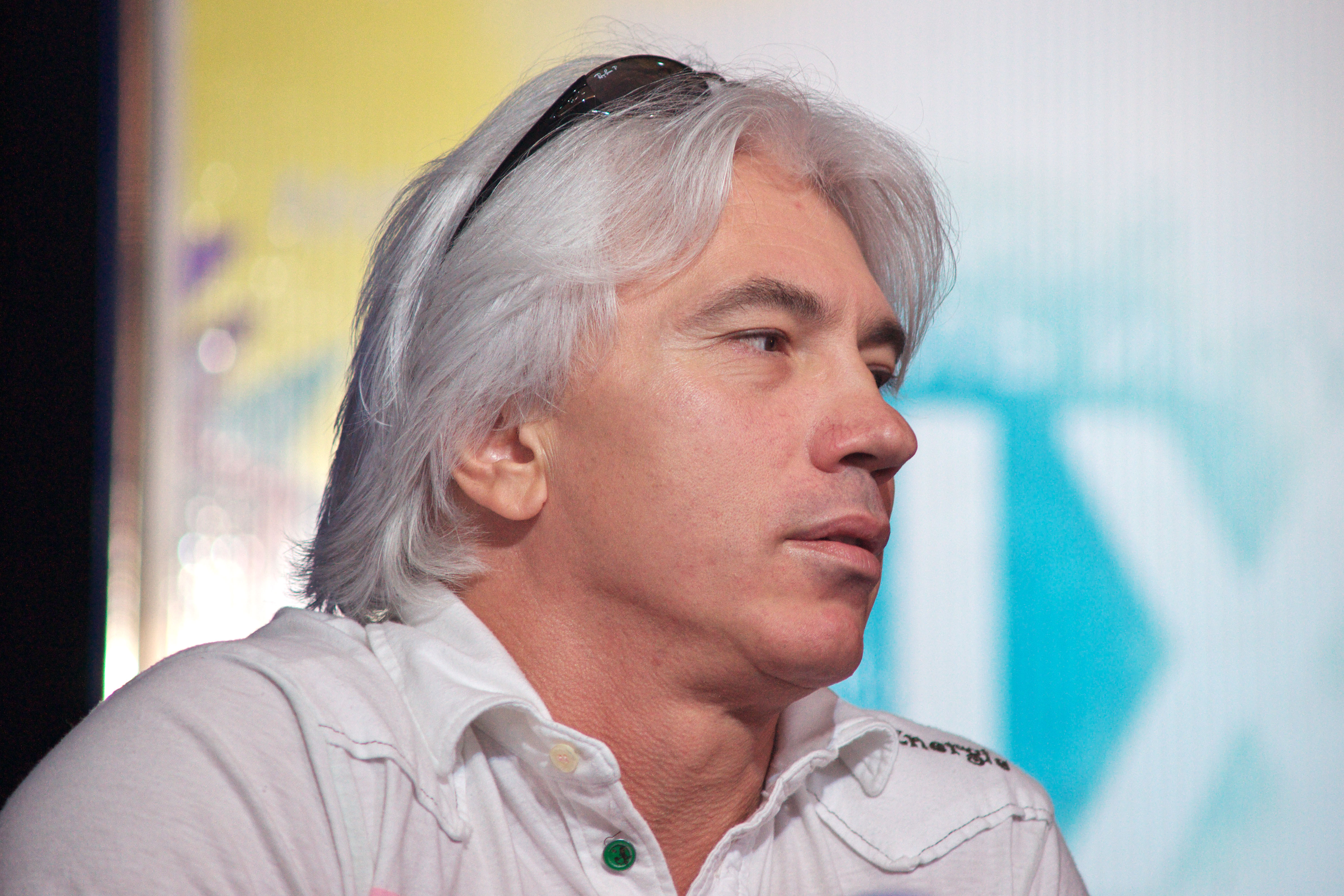
Dmitri Hvorostovsky (1962–2017)

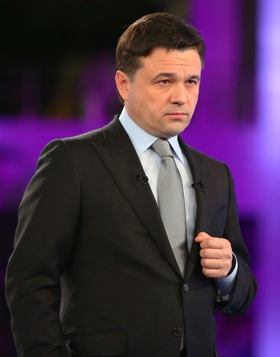
Andrey Vorobyov (born 1970)

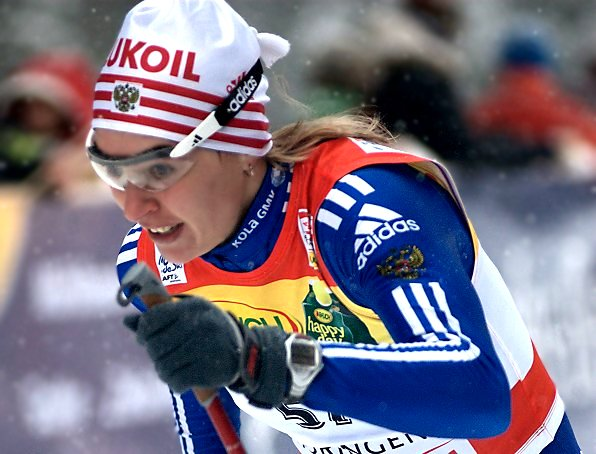
Olga Rocheva (born 1978)

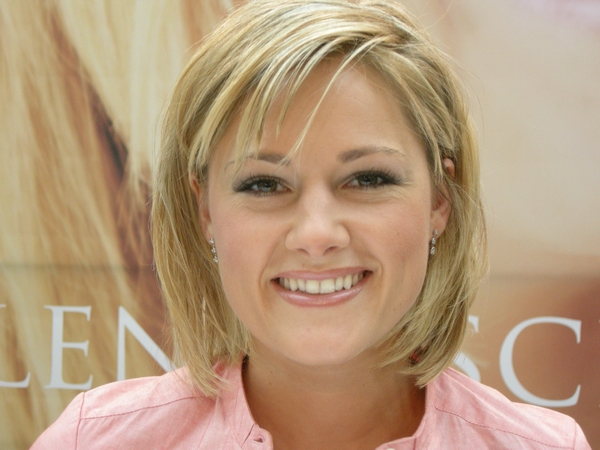
Helene Fischer (born 1984)

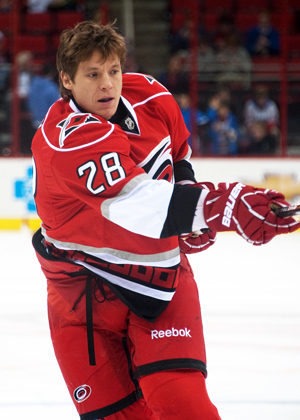
Alexander Semin (born 1984)

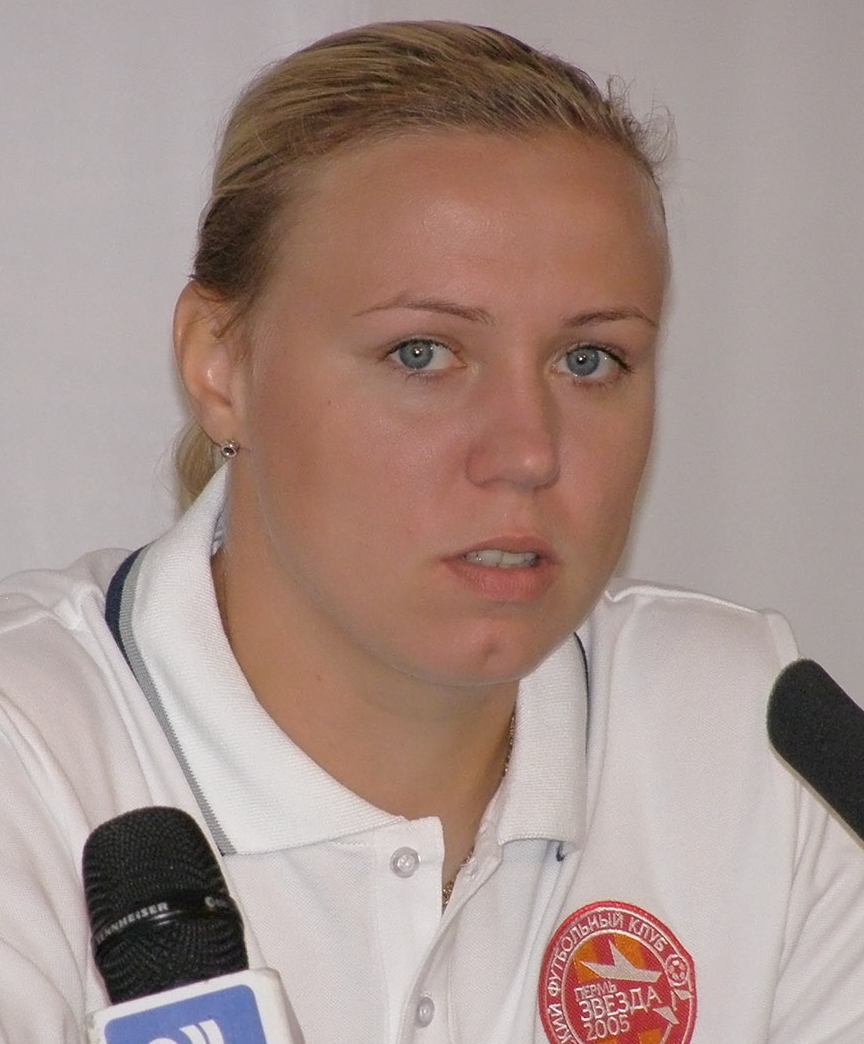
Elena Suslova (born 1984)

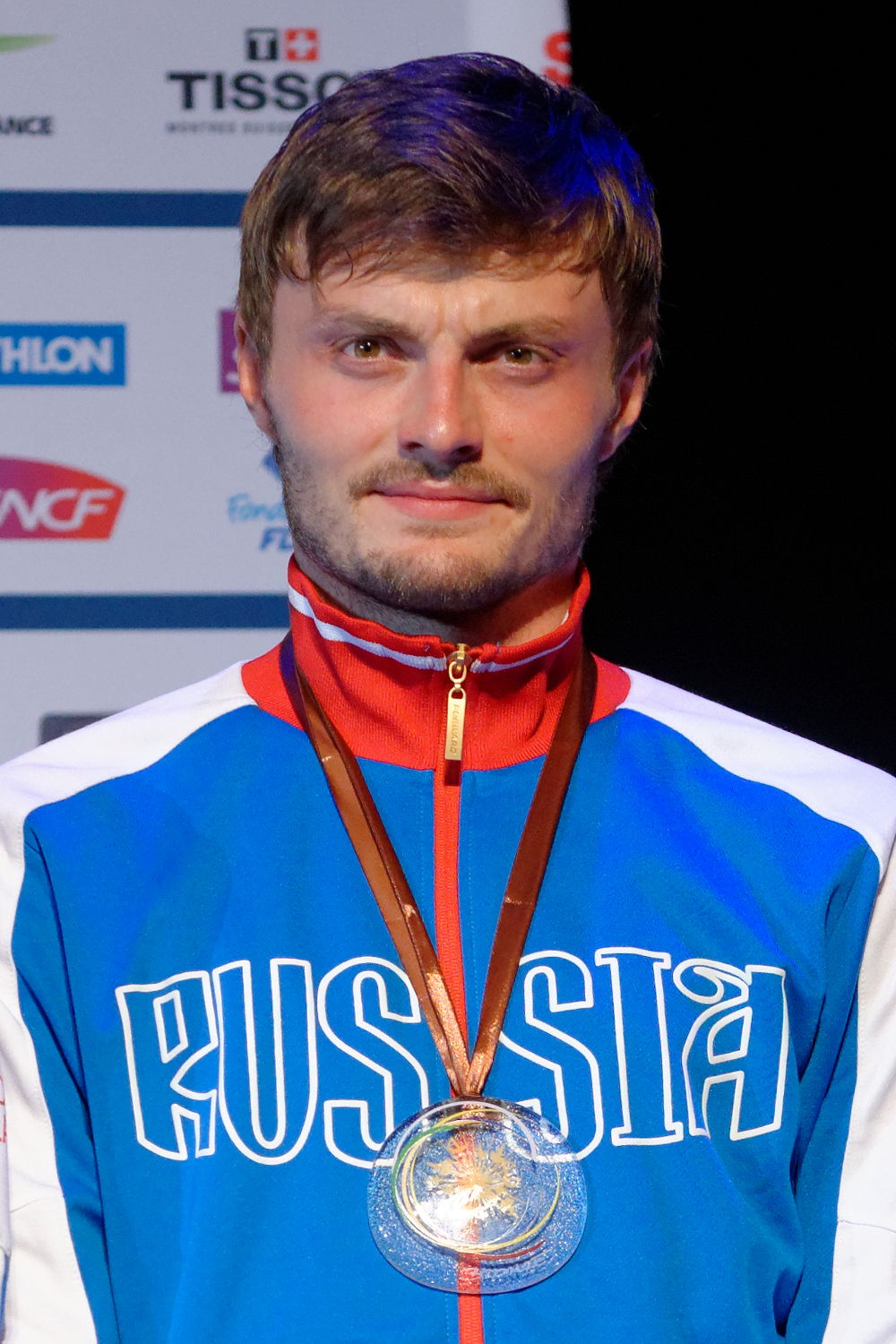
Dmitry Rigin (born 1985)

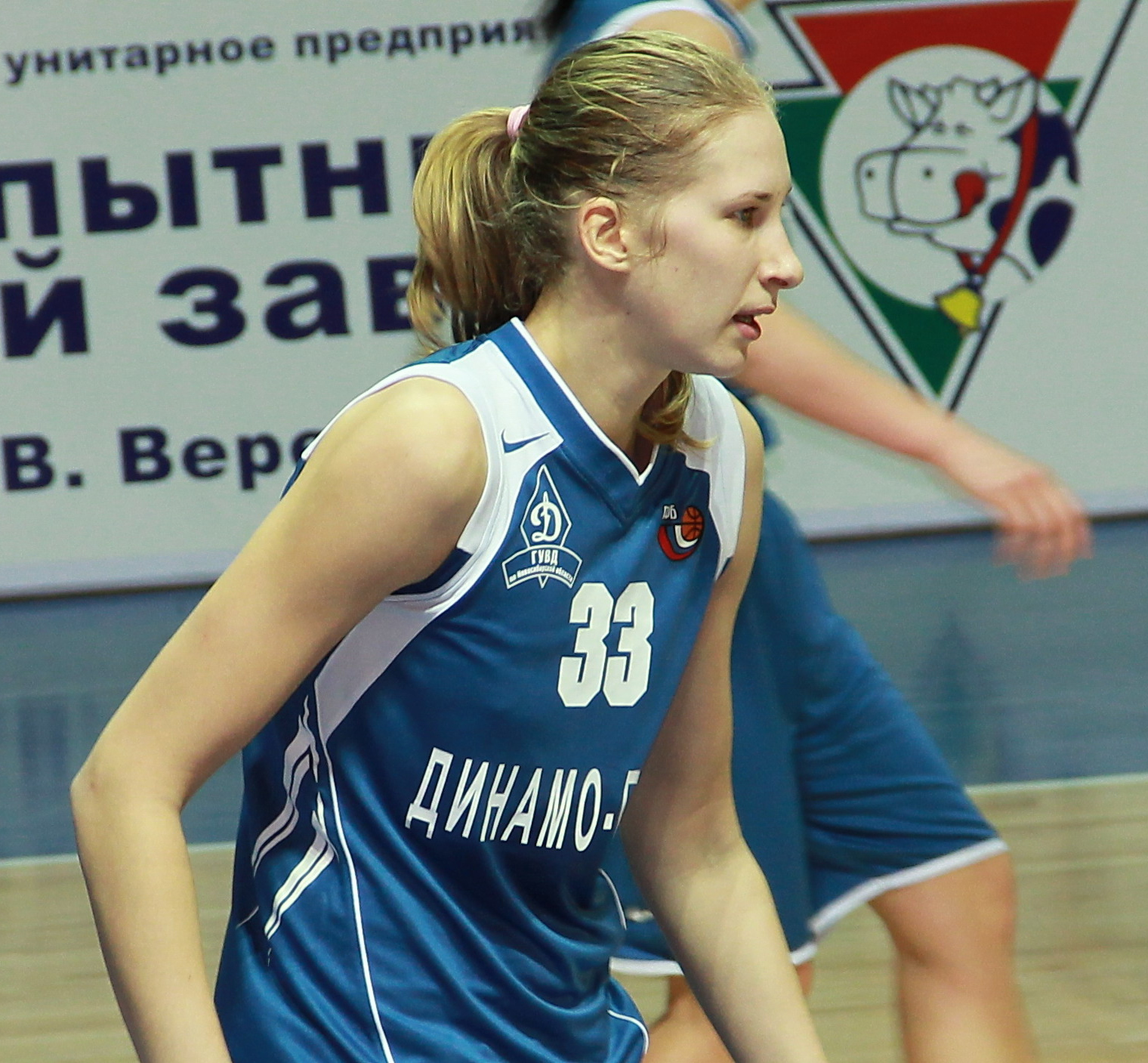
Natalia Myasoyedova (born 1987)

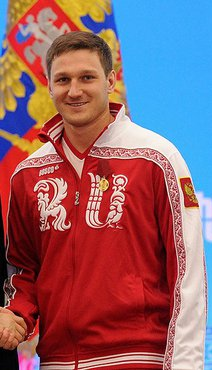
Nikolay Olyunin (born 1991)

== Born in Krasnoyarsk ==
=== 19th century ===
==== 1801–1900 ====
- Vasily Surikov (1848–1916), Russian painter
- Vladimir Rebikov (1866–1920), Russian composer and pianist
- Pyotr Krasikov (1870–1939), functionary of the All-Union Communist Party (bolsheviks) and the Soviet Union; the first Procurator General of the Soviet Union, serving from 1924 to 1933
- Abram Markson (1888–1938), Russian and Soviet violinist and conductor

=== 20th century ===
==== 1901–1930 ====
- Vitaly Abalakov (1906–1986), Soviet mountaineer and inventor
- Yevgeniy Abalakov (1907–1948), Soviet alpinist and sculptor
- Tatiana Kopnina (1921–2009), Soviet Russian painter and art teacher
- Bob Martin (1922–1998), Austrian singer
- Elena Abramovna Davidovich (1922–2013), Russian numismatist
- Viktor Astafyev (1924–2001), Soviet and Russian writer
- Yuz Aleshkovsky (1929–2022), Russian writer, poet, playwright and performer of his own songs

==== 1931–1950 ====
- Eduard Shafransky (1937–2005), Russian classical guitarist and composer
- Eduard Malofeyev (born 1942), Soviet and Belarusian football coach and player
- Vladimir Krainev (1944–2011), Russian pianist and professor of piano
- Yevgeni Popov (born 1946), Russian writer
- Valery Shmukler (1946–2023), Soviet Ukrainian engineer
- Viktor Tretiakov (born 1946), Russian violinist and conductor
- Vladimir Kvint (born 1949), Russian-American economist and strategist
- Yevgeniy Yevsyukov (born 1950), Russian race walker

==== 1951–1960 ====
- Jurgis Kairys (born 1952), Lithuanian aerobatic pilot and aeronautical engineer
- Oleg Romantsev (born 1954), Soviet and Russian international footballer and coach
- Sergey Lomanov, Sr. (born 1957), Russian bandy manager and former player (forward)
- Andreï Makine (born 1957), Russian-born French author
- Galina Yenyukhina (born 1959), Russian cyclist
- Edkham Akbulatov (born 1960), Russian politician

==== 1961–1970 ====
- Dmitri Hvorostovsky (1962–2017), Russian operatic baritone
- Zosimus Davydov (1963–2010), Russian Orthodox bishop of Yakutsk and Lensk
- Alexej Jaškin (born 1965), Russian-born Czech professional ice hockey defenceman
- Sergei Kruglov (born 1966), Russian poet and priest
- Oleg Kuzhlev (born 1966), Russian professional football coach and a former player
- Vyacheslav Atavin (born 1967), Soviet and Russian handball player
- Svetlana Fedotkina (born 1967), Russian speed skater
- Sergei Klischin (born 1967), Austrian judoka
- Orit Zuaretz (born 1967), Israeli politician
- Vladimir Baksheyev (born 1970), Russian professional footballer
- Andrey Vorobyov (born 1970), Russian politician, governor of Moscow Oblast since 2013
- Victor Remsha (born 1970), Russian businessman
- Mikhail Terentiev (born 1970), Russian Paralympian

==== 1971–1980 ====
- Svetlana Tchernousova (born 1972), Russian former biathlete
- Igor Bakhtin (born 1973), Russian professional football coach and a former player
- Larissa Loukianenko (born 1973), Belarusian individual rhythmic gymnast
- Maxim Galanov (born 1974), Russian professional ice hockey player
- Yevgeni Popov (born 1976), Russian bobsledder
- Konstantin Aladashvili (born 1977), Russian bobsledder and skeleton racer
- Andrei Drygin (born 1977), Tajik alpine skier of Russian ethnicity
- Yekaterina Mironova (born 1977), Russian skeleton racer
- Svetlana Khustik (born 1978), Russian journalist
- Yuliya Pechonkina (born 1978), Russian athlete
- Olga Rocheva (born 1978), Russian cross country skier
- Natalya Safronova (born 1979), Russian female volleyball player
- Alyona Sidko (born 1979), Russian cross-country skier
- Elena Khrustaleva (born 1980), Russian, Belarusian and Kazakh biathlete
- Sergey Lomanov, Jr. (born 1980), Russian bandy player (forward)
- Pavel Shestakov (born 1980), Russian former alpine skier

==== 1981–1985 ====
- Dmitry Abramovitch (born 1982), Russian bobsledder
- Anastasia Tambovtseva (born 1982), Russian luger
- Jury Veselov (born 1982), Russian luger
- Aleksandr Kharitonov (born 1983), Russian footballer
- Maksim Semakin (born 1983), Russian professional football player
- Viktoria Tereshkina (born 1983), Russian ballet dancer
- Andrey Yurkov (born 1983), Russian bobsledder
- Anna Astapenko (born 1984), Russian football defender
- Helene Fischer (born 1984), German singer and entertainer
- Evgeny Isakov (born 1984), Russian professional ice hockey forward
- Mikhail Komkov (born 1984), Russian professional footballer
- Alexander Semin (born 1984), Russian professional ice hockey winger
- Elena Suslova (born 1984), Russian football defender
- Yuliya Tarasenko (born 1984), Russian ski orienteering competitor
- Mikhail Kuzmich (born 1985), Russian luger
- Dmitry Rigin (born 1985), Russian foil fencer
- Aleksandr Tretyakov (born 1985), Russian skeleton racer
- Sergei Chepchugov (born 1985), Russian professional footballer
- Evgeny Ustyugov (born 1985), Russian biathlete

==== 1986–1990 ====
- Polina Malchikova (born 1986), Russian ski-orienteering competitor
- Iya Gavrilova (born 1987), Russian ice hockey player
- Natalia Myasoyedova (born 1987), Russian basketball center
- Timofey Lapshin (born 1988), Russian biathlete
- Olga Korobkina (born 1989), Russian skeleton racer
- Yevgeni Pesegov (born 1989), Russian professional footballer
- Olga Potylitsina (born 1989), Russian skeleton racer
- Igor Polyanski (born 1990), Russian professional triathlete

==== 1991–2000 ====
- Vladislav Antonov (born 1991), Russian luger
- Alexander Denisyev (born 1991), Russian luger
- Ksenia Krasilnikova (born 1991), Russian pair skater
- Nikolay Olyunin (born 1991), Russian snowboarder
- Ekaterina Baturina (born 1992), Russian luger
- Nikolay Martsenko (born 1993), Russian racing car driver
- Elizaveta Axenova (born 1995), Russian-born Kazakhstani luger
- Nikita Tregubov (born 1995), Russian skeleton racer
- Anton Mitryushkin (born 1996), Russian professional football player
- Alexey Bugaev (born 1997), Russian para-alpine skier

2000-2010

=== 20th century ===
==== 2001-2010 ====
- Erika Andreeva (born 2004), Russian tennis player
- Vanya Dmitrienko (born 2005), Russian singer man
- Mirra Andreeva (born 2007), Russian tennis player

== Lived in Krasnoyarsk ==
- Nikolai Rezanov (1764–1807), Russian nobleman and statesman who promoted the project of Russian colonization of Alaska and California; died in Krasnoyarsk
- Christian Friedrich Lessing (1809–1862), German botanist; died in Krasnoyarsk
- Luka (Voyno-Yasenetsky) (1877–1961), bishop of Russian Orthodox Church and an archbishop of Simferopol and of the Crimea
- Pyotr Slovtsov (1886–1934), Russian tenor
- Vladimir Dolgikh (1924–2020), Russian politician
- Innokenty Smoktunovsky (1925–1994), Soviet actor
- Valentin Danilov (born 1948), Russian physicist
- Aleksandr Bushkov (1956–2025), Russian writer
- Vladimir Shalaev (born 1957), American physicist of Russian descent
- Vyacheslav Butusov (born 1961), Russian singer and songwriter

== See also ==
- List of Russian people
- List of Russian-language poets
