= 2009 Russian Women's Football Championship =

The 2009 Russian Women's Football Championship was the 18th edition of the top category in Russian women's football. Like the previous year the competition was contested by seven teams, with Lada Togliatti and Zvezda Zvenigorod replacing disbanded teams Nadezhda Noginsk and SKA Rostov to join Energiya Voronezh, ShVSM Izmailovo, WFC Rossiyanka, Ryazan VDV and Zvezda Perm. Twelve game weeks were played from May 7 to October 29, 2009.

The championship was won for the third year in a row by European Cup runner-up Zvezda Perm, which became the first team to achieve this since the competition's foundation in 1992. Rossiyanka was the championship's runner-up, also qualifying for the Champions League. 2004 champion Lada Togliatti was disbanded after Week 9.

== Table ==
| Pos | Team | P | W | D | L | GF | GA | GD | Pts | PS | Q/R |
|---|---|---|---|---|---|---|---|---|---|---|---|
| 1 | Zvezda Perm (C) | 12 | 11 | 0 | 1 | 46 | 10 | 36 | 33 | Same position | 2010-11 Champions League (round of 32) |
| 2 | Rossiyanka | 12 | 8 | 3 | 1 | 31 | 8 | 23 | 27 | Same position | 2010-11 Champions League (qual. stage) |
| 3 | Energiya Voronezh | 12 | 7 | 0 | 5 | 20 | 16 | 4 | 21 | ▲4 | |
| 4 | Izmailovo | 12 | 5 | 2 | 5 | 15 | 12 | 3 | 21 | ▲2 | |
| 5 | Ryazan | 12 | 5 | 1 | 6 | 19 | 21 | -2 | 16 | ▼1 | |
| 6 | Zvezda Zvenigorod | 12 | 1 | 1 | 10 | 9 | 41 | -32 | 4 | New entry | |
| 7 | Lada Togliatti | 7 | 1 | 1 | 5 | 6 | 23 | -17 | 4 | New entry | Disbanded after 7 games |

== Results ==
| 2009 | ZVP | ROS | ENV | IZM | RYA | ZVZ | LAT |
|---|---|---|---|---|---|---|---|
| Zvezda P. | | 1–3 | 1–0 | 4–0 | 3–2 | 6–1 | 10–1 |
| Rossiyanka | 1–2 | | 3–0 | 3–0 | 2–2 | 5–1 | 4–0 |
| Energiya Voronezh | 2–4 | 0–3 | | 1–0 | 2–0 | 5–2 | 2–0 |
| Izmailovo | 0–1 | 0–0 | 1–0 | | 3–0 | 1–0 | w/o |
| Ryazan | 0–4 | 1–3 | 1–2 | 2–1 | | 4–0 | 2–0 |
| Zvezda Z. | 0–7 | 1–1 | 0–2 | 0–5 | 1–2 | | 0–3 |
| Lada Togliatti | w/o | w/o | 1–4 | 1–1 | w/o | w/o | |

== Top scorers ==
| Rank | Player | Team | Goals |
|---|---|---|---|
| 1 | (Ukraine) Daryna Apanaschenko | Zvezda Perm | 12 |
| 1 | (Russia) Olesya Kurochkina | Zvezda Perm | 12 |
| 3 | (Russia) Olga Letyushova | Izmailovo | 8 |
| 4 | (Russia) Nadezhda Bosikova | Energiya Voronezh | 7 |
| 5 | (Nigeria) Emueje Ogbiagbevha | Rossiyanka | 6 |
| 6 | (Russia) Svetlana Zangieva | Ryazan | 5 |
| 6 | (Ukraine) Natalia Zinchenko | Zvezda Perm | 5 |
| 8 | (Russia) Elena Danilova | Rossiyanka | 4 |
| 8 | (Ukraine) Vera Dyatel | Zvezda Perm | 4 |
| 8 | (Russia) Elena Gorbacheva | Ryazan | 4 |
| 8 | (Russia) Svetlana Tsydikova | Energiya Voronezh | 4 |
