= List of Zvezda 2005 Perm seasons =

This is a list of seasons played by women's football club Zvezda 2005 Perm, in Russian and European football, from its foundation to the latest completed season.

== Summary ==
Champions	Runners-up	Promoted	Relegated

Domestic and international results of Zvezda 2005 Perm
Season	League										Cup	Europe		League top scorer	
Season	Division	Tier	Pos	P	W	D	L	F	A	Pts	Cup	Europe		Name(s)	Goals
2006	Supreme Division	2	2	10	7	1	2	30	3	22	R16			(Russia) Olga Letyushova	19
2007	Supreme Division	1	1	16	15	1	0	57	12	46	RU			(Russia) Olga Letyushova	19
2008	Supreme Division	1	1	18	15	3	0	55	8	48	RU	UEFA Women's Cup	RU	(Russia) Natalia Barbashina	12
2009	Supreme Division	1	1	12	11	0	1	46	10	33	RU	Champions League	R16	(Ukraine) Apanaschenko & (Russia) Kurochkina	12
2010	Supreme Division	1	3	28	15	1	8	51	29	46	SF	Champions League	QF	(Russia) Olesya Kurochkina	17
2011–12	Supreme Division	1	4	28	15	4	9	58	37	49	W			(Russia) Olesya Kurochkina	13
2012–13	Supreme Division	1	4	20	7	4	9	18	21	25				(Ukraine) Daryna Apanaschenko	4
2013	Supreme Division	1	2	14	9	2	3	28	10	29	W			(Ukraine) Daryna Apanaschenko	8
2014	Supreme Division	1	1	17	12	1	4	31	15	37	SF	Champions League	R16	(Ukraine) Daryna Apanaschenko	8
2015	Supreme Division	1	1	20	12	4	4	46	19	37	W	Champions League	R16	(Ukraine) Daryna Apanaschenko	13
2016	Supreme Division	1	2	15	8	2	5	24	13	18	W	Champions League	R32	(Ukraine) Daryna Apanaschenko	6
2017	Supreme Division	1	1	14	11	2	1	32	7	35	SF	Champions League	R32	(Russia) Olesya Kurochkina	9
