= Anna Astapenko =

Russian footballer (born 1984)

Anna Astapenko Анна Астапенко
Personal information
- Full name: Anna Viktorovna Astapenko
- Date of birth: 18 August 1984 (age 42)
- Place of birth: Krasnoyarsk, Soviet Union
- Height: 1.69 m (5 ft 7 in)
- Positions: Defender; midfielder

Senior career*
Years	Team	Apps	(Gls)
- Prialit Reutov
2003–2004	Rossiyanka		
2005–2006	Spartak Moscow		
2007	Nadezhda Noginsk	14	(3)
2008	SKA Rostov	17	(3)
2009–2010	Ryazan VDV	34	(2)
2011	Energiya Voronezh	15	(1)
2012–2014	Izmailovo	48	(1)
- * Club domestic league appearances and goals

Anna Viktorovna Astapenko (Russian: Анна Викторовна Астапенко; born 18 August 1984) is a retired Russian football defender, who most recently played for ShVSM Izmailovo in the Russian Championship. A former Under-19 international, she has played in the Champions League with Energiya Voronezh.
