= Nikita Popov =

Russian ice hockey player (born 1992)

- Born: July 11, 1992 (age 33) Cherepovets, Russia
- Height: 6 ft 0 in (183 cm)
- Weight: 161 lb (73 kg; 11 st 7 lb)
- Position: Defence
- Shoots: Right
- VHL team Former teams: Sokol Krasnoyarsk; Severstal Cherepovets; Metallurg Novokuznetsk
- NHL draft: Undrafted
- Playing career: 2010–present

Nikita Popov (born July 11, 1992) is a Russian ice hockey defenceman. He is currently playing with Sokol Krasnoyarsk of the Supreme Hockey League (VHL).

Popov made his Kontinental Hockey League debut playing with Severstal Cherepovets during the 2011–12 KHL season.
