= Elena Schegaleva =

Russian footballer (born 1987)

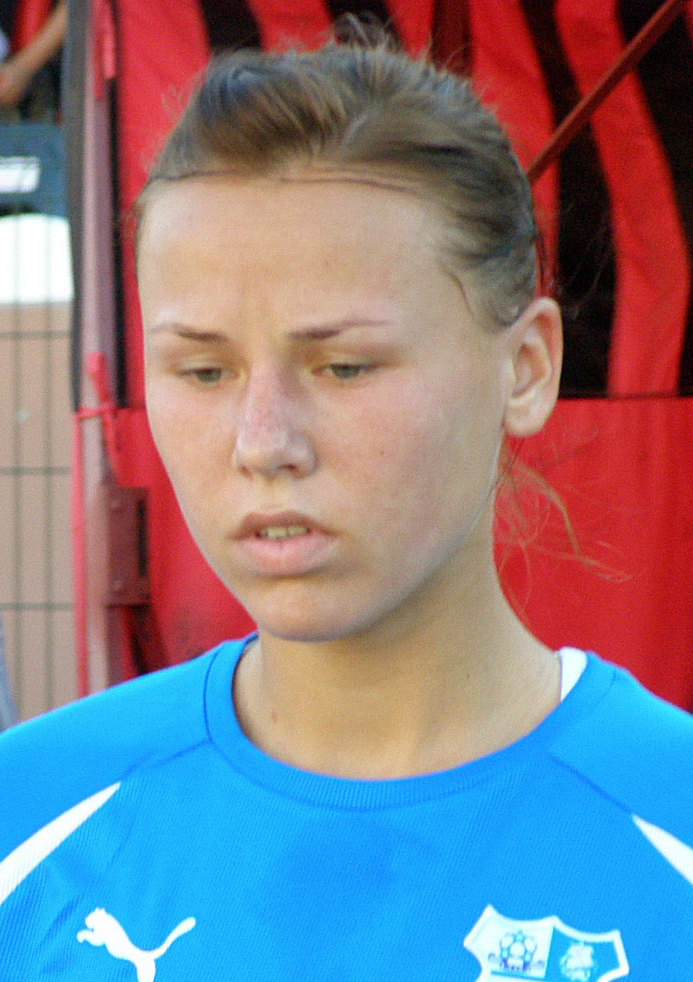

Personal information
- Full name: Elena Schegaleva
- Date of birth: 2 June 1987 (age 39)
- Place of birth: Olonets, Karelian ASSR, RSFSR, Soviet Union
- Position: Midfielder

Senior career*
Years	Team	Apps	(Gls)
- Iskra Saint Petersburg
2009–2010	ShVSM Izmailovo		
2011–2012	WFC Rossiyanka	15	(3)

International career
- Russia U-19
2011	Russia	4	(0)
- * Club domestic league appearances and goals

Elena Schegaleva (Russian: Елена Викторовна Щегалёва, romanized: Yelena Viktorovna Shchegalyova) is a Russian football midfielder, who played for WFC Rossiyanka in the Russian Championship. She previously played for ShVSM Izmailovo.

She was a member of the Russian team that won the 2005 U-19 European Championship. She has four international caps.
