= Yuz =

Yuz can refer to:

- Yuz Aleshkovsky (1929–2022), a Russian writer and poet
- Yuracaré language, an endangered language isolate spoken in Bolivia, by ISO 639 code
