= Yashkin =

Yashkin or Jaškin (Russian: Яшкин) is a Slavic masculine surname of Jewish origin, its feminine counterpart is Yashkina or Jaškina. It may refer to

- Alexej Jaškin (born 1965), is a Russian-born Czech ice hockey defenceman
- Artem Yashkin (born 1975), Ukrainian football player
- Dmitrij Jaškin (born 1993), Russian-born Czech ice hockey player
