= 2010 Russian Women's Football Championship =

The 2010 Russian Women's Football Championship was the 19th edition of the top division in Russian women's football. The competition was doubled from 12 to 24 game weeks, and took place from April 17 — October 17, 2010. For the third year in a row it was contested by seven teams, with Kubanochka Krasnodar replacing disbanded Lada Togliatti to join Energiya Voronezh, ShVSM Izmailovo, WFC Rossiyanka, Ryazan VDV, Zvezda Perm and Zvezda Zvenigorod.

Winning all matches but one, Rossiyanka won its third title, ending Zvezda Perm's dominance in the previous three seasons. Energiya Voronezh also qualified for the 2011-12 Champions League after beating Zvezda Perm in the last match. Zvezda Zvenigorod was disbanded at the end of the season, sparing Kubanochka Krasnodar from relegation.

== Table ==
Pos	Team	P	W	D	L	GF	GA	GD	Pts	PS	Q/R
1	Rossiyanka	24	23	0	1	91	15	76	69	▲1	2011-12 Champions League (round of 32)
2	Energiya Voronezh	24	15	2	7	59	29	30	47	▲1	2011-12 Champions League (round of 32)
3	Zvezda Perm (C)	24	15	1	8	51	29	22	46	▼2	
4	Izmailovo	24	12	5	7	38	33	5	41	Same position	
5	Ryazan	24	7	1	16	28	49	-21	22	Same position	
6	Zvezda Zvenigorod	24	5	1	18	20	70	-50	16	Same position	Disbanded after the end of the season
7	Kubanochka	24	1	2	21	7	69	-62	5	New entry	

== Results ==
2010	ROS	ENV	ZVP	IZM	RYA	ZVZ	KUB
Rossiyanka		3–1 4–2	4–0 4–0	5–1 4–1	6–1 3–1	6–0 5–0	6–0 5–0
Energiya	0–1 0–1		1–3 3–1	0–2 1–0	4–0 1–0	5–1 3–0	2–0 8–0
Zvezda P.	2–3 1–3	3–0 2–3		1–1 2–0	2–0 0–2	6–2 4–1	4–0 2–0
Izmailovo	0–6 1–0	2–3 3–3	0–2 1–0		2–0 4–2	1–0 3–0	1–1 1–1
Ryazan	1–3 1–3	1–6 0–4	0–3 0–1	0–1 1–1		5–1 2–0	1–0 2–0
Zvezda Z.	1–5 0–4	0–2 1–1	1–4 0–3	1–6 0–1	1–3 1–0		1–0 4–0
Kubanochka	1–3 0–4	1–4 0–2	0–3 0–2	0–3 0–2	0–4 2–1	1–2 0–2	

== Top scorers ==
Rank	Player	Team	Goals
1	(Nigeria) Emueje Ogbiagbevha	Rossiyanka	23
2	(Russia) Olesya Kurochkina	Zvezda Perm	17
3	(Russia) Elena Danilova	Energiya Voronezh	16
4	(Russia) Tatyana Skotnikova	Rossiyanka	13
5	(Russia) Elena Morozova	Rossiyanka	12
6	(Russia) Natalia Mokshanova	Rossiyanka	11
7	(Ukraine) Lyudmyla Pekur	Energiya Voronezh	10
8	(Ukraine) Vera Dyatel	Zvezda Perm	9
8	(Russia) Olga Petrova	Rossiyanka	9
8	(Russia) Oksana Ryabinicheva	Energiya Voronezh	9
