= Anastasiya Akimova =

Russian footballer (born 1991)

Personal information
- Full name: Anastasiya Akimova; Анастасия Акимова
- Date of birth: 21 May 1991 (age 35)
- Place of birth: Moscow, Soviet Union
- Height: 1.67 m (5 ft 6 in)
- Position: Defender

Team information
- Current team: Zvezda Perm
- Number: 90

Youth career
- UOR Uzonovo

Senior career*
Years	Team	Apps	(Gls)
2009–2010	Zvezda Zvenigorod	34	(3)
2011–2014	Rossiyanka	48	(1)
2015-2015	Torpedo Moscow	3	(1)
2015–	Zvezda Perm	129	(6)

International career
2011–	Russia	21	(0)
- * Club domestic league appearances and goals

Anastasiya Akimova (Russian: Анастасия Акимова; born 21 May 1991) is a Russian football defender who plays for Zvezda Perm of the Russian Championship. She played before for Rossiyanka having also represented the club in the UEFA Women's Champions League.

Akimova was included in the Russian national team's squad for the first matches of the 2013 European Championship qualifying campaign, and made her debut as a substitute in a 4–0 win over Greece.

She was not included in national coach Sergei Lavrentyev's squad for the final tournament in Sweden.

== Honours ==
=== Club ===
WFC Rossiyanka

- Top Division (1): 2011–12
