= Olesya Mashina =

Russian footballer (born 1987)

Personal information
- Full name: Olesya Mashina
- Date of birth: 4 October 1987 (age 39)
- Place of birth: Soviet Union
- Height: 1.68 m (5 ft 6 in)
- Positions: Defender; midfielder

Senior career*
| Years | Team | Apps | (Gls) |
| 2005–2006 | Prialit Reutov | | (2) |
| 2007 | FK Khimki | | (4) |
| 2008 | SKA Rostov | | |
| 2009–2010 | Ryazan VDV | 33 | (5) |
| 2011–2012 | Energiya Voronezh | 18 | (0) |
| 2012–2016 | WFC Rossiyanka | 10 | (1) |

International career
| 2011–2016 | Russia | 22 | (4) |
- * Club domestic league appearances and goals

Olesya Mashina is a former Russian football midfielder, who played for Rossiyanka in the Russian Championship. She has also played the Champions League with Energiya Voronezh. A member of the Russian national team since 2011, as a junior international she won the 2005 U-19 European Championship.
