= Elizaveta Sergeychik =

Belarusian footballer

Personal information
- Date of birth: 19 March 1997 (age 29)
- Place of birth: Grodno, Belarus
- Position: Forward

Team information
- Current team: Zvezda Perm
- Number: 97

Senior career*
Years	Team	Apps	(Gls)
2012–2015	Neman Grodno	65	(36)
2016–2017	FC Minsk	2	(0)
2017	Neman Grodno	6	(2)
2018	FC Minsk	2	(0)
2018-2020	Neman Grodno	51	(35)
2021–	Zvezda Perm	93	(10)

International career^{‡}
2015-	Belarus	3	(0)
- * Club domestic league appearances and goals as of 1 June 2025 ‡ National team caps and goals as of 19:26, 30 August 2019 (UTC)

Elizaveta Sergeychik (born 19 March 1997) is a Belarusian footballer who plays as a forward for Zvezda 2005 Perm and has appeared for the Belarus women's national team.

== Career ==
Sergeychik has been capped for the Belarus national team, appearing for the team during the 2019 FIFA Women's World Cup qualifying cycle.
