= Annette Jacky Messomo =

Cameroonian footballer

Jacky Messomo
Personal information
- Full name: Annette Jacky Messomo
- Date of birth: 1 March 1993 (age 33)
- Place of birth: Ebolowa, Cameroon
- Height: 1.74 m (5 ft 9 in)
- Position: Midfielder

College career
Years	Team	Apps	(Gls)
2023	Sherbrooke Vert et Or		

Senior career*
Years	Team	Apps	(Gls)
2008	Franck Rholiceck Douala		
2010–2011	FC Energy Voronezh		
2012–2013	Louves Minproff Yaoundé		
2013	Nové Zámky		
2014	Panthère Security Garoua		
2015	Spartak Subotica		
2016–2017	BIIK Kazygurt	11	(2)
2019	Texas Spurs		
2020	A&N		

International career
2016–2018	Equatorial Guinea		
- * Club domestic league appearances and goals

Annette Jacky Messomo (born 1 March 1993) is a footballer who plays as a midfielder. Born and raised in Cameroon, she is a naturalized citizen of Equatorial Guinea and has played for that women's national team.

== Early life ==
Messomo was born in Ebolowa, into an Eton family. She grew up in Cameroon where she fell in love with football. She has played football since she was 6 years old, mostly with co-ed teams, due to Cameroon not having an organized structure for women's football.

== Club career ==
Messomo has played for Franck Rholiceck Douala, Louves Minproff Yaoundé and Panthère Security Garoua in Cameroon. She has made appearances at the UEFA Women's Champions League for FK Union Nové Zámky, ŽFK Spartak Subotica and BIIK Kazygurt, clubs from Slovakia, Serbia and Kazakhstan, respectively.

== International career ==
Despite being born in Cameroon, whose women's national football team had pre-called up her in March 2014, Messomo began to play for Equatorial Guinea in 2016. She had previously been called up for them in 2011.

In September 2018, Messomo was declared by FIFA as ineligible to play for Equatorial Guinea because there were allegations of her not being eligible to represent Equatorial Guinea since she was born in Cameroon. The decision was later overruled by the Appeal Board of CAF.

== Personal life ==
In 2015, Messomo began studying at University of Yaoundé II, pursuing a degree in Business administration.
