= FC Energy Voronezh =

- Full name: FC Energy Voronezh
- Founded: 1989; 37 years ago
- Dissolved: 2012; 14 years ago
- Ground: Stadion Rudgormash
- Capacity: 2,000
- League: Premier League
- 2010: 2nd
- Website: www.fcenergy.ru
Home colours	Away colours

FC Energy Voronezh (Russian: «Энергия» Воронеж) was a women's football club from Voronezh, Russia.

The club holds the most championships in Russian, having 5 championships to its name. In 1994 the team won the vice championship behind CSK WWS Samara. From that time to 2004 when the club finished third, the team always achieved at least a second-place finish winning titles in 1995, 1997, 1998, 2002 and 2003.

== History ==
Founded in 1989, Energiya started in the also newly founded Soviet Championship's second tier. In 1990 the club managed a mid-table 8th place, while in the next season it gained promotion to the new top division after winning its group and the subsequent playoffs against the other group winners. Following the dissolution of the Soviet Union Energiya was instead registered in the new Russian Championship.

Energiya, which was known in 2000 and 2001 as Energiya XXI Wiek Voronezh («Энергия XXI Век» Воронеж) for sponsorship reasons, soon became a national powerhouse; always ranking in the two top positions for a decade, it won five championships between 1995 and 2003. The club was even more successful in the national cup, with seven trophies between 1993 and 2001 including two three-years winning streaks. In 2004 and 2005 it also played the UEFA Women's Cup, where it reached the quarter-finals both times, losing to eventual champions Umeå IK and Turbine Potsdam.

This last European campaign marked the end of the club's golden era as it had to withdraw from the 2005 championship due to financial trouble, playing instead in the second tier. Energiya returned to the top category in 2008, losing all 16 games but avoiding relegation due to the dissolution of Nadezhda Noginsk and SKA Rostov. In 2009 it returned to the top positions, and in 2010 it qualified to the new UEFA Women's Champions League (where it was defeated in the Round of 16 by compatriot rival WFC Rossiyanka) by beating 2009 European runner-up Zvezda Perm in a last-week match for the second place. However the club's comeback was short-lived, as in June 2012 it again had to disband its squad and withdraw from the premier category for financial reasons.

== Honours ==
=== Titles ===
- Russian Championship (5)
  - 1995, 1997, 1998, 2002, 2003
- Russian Cup (7)
  - 1993, 1995, 1996, 1997, 1999, 2000, 2001

=== Other results ===
Russian Championship
Place	Year
2nd	1994, 1996, 1999, 2000, 2001
3rd	2004, 2009, 2012
6th	1992, 1993
7th	2008

Russian Cup
Result	Year
Runner-up	1994, 2003, 2010
Semifinals	2002, 2009, 2012
Quarterfinals	1991, 2004, 2005, 2006
Round of 16	1992

=== Record in UEFA competitions ===
Season	Competition	Stage	Result	Opponent	Scorers
2003–04	UEFA Women's Cup	Group Stage	11–0	(Hungary) Femina Budapest	Morozova 3, Zinchenko 3, Skotnikova 2, Strukova 2, Terekhova
			0–0	(Italy) Foroni Verona	
			13–0	(Croatia) ZNK Osijek	Zinchenko 5, Danilova 3, Degai, Morozova, Saenko, Shmachkova, Stepanenko
		Quarterfinals	1–2, 1–2	(Sweden) Umeå IK	Danilova, Sitnikova
2004–05	UEFA Women's Cup	Qualifying Stage	13–0	(North Macedonia) ZFK Skiponjat	Gorbacheva 4, Benson 3, Zvarych 3, Apanaschenko, Bukashkina, Kozhnikova
			11–0	(Lithuania) Gintra Universitetas	Zinchenko 4, Apanaschenko 2, Terekhova 2, Benson, Gorbacheva, Lamtyugina
			3–0	(Azerbaijan) Gömrükçü Baku	Terekhova 2, Apanaschenko
		Group Stage	1–1	(Denmark) Brøndby IF	Zinchenko
			1–1	(Norway) Trondheims-Ørn	Bosikova
			4–1	(Kazakhstan) Alma KTZh	Rastetter 3 + 1 o.g.
		Quarterfinals	1–1, 1–4	(Germany) Turbine Potsdam	Bosikova, Rastetter
2011–12	UEFA Champions League	Round of 32	1–1, 4–2	(England) Bristol Academy	Conti 2, Mashina 2, Boquete
		Round of 16	0–4, 3–3	(Russia) Rossiyanka	Danilova, Ogbiagbevha, Terekhova

== Former internationals ==
- Russia: Nadezhda Bosikova, Kristina Chichkala, Elena Danilova, Anastasia Kostyukova, Anna Kozhnikova, Elena Lamtyugina, Olesya Mashina, Oksana Ryabinicheva, Marina Saenko, Oksana Shmachkova, Vera Strukova, Elena Terekhova, Yulia Zapotichnaya
- Brazil: Simone Gomes
- Cameroon: Augustine Ejangue, Njoya Nkout
- Equatorial Guinea: Adriana Parente, (Note: On October 5, 2017, FIFA declared her ineligible to play for Equatorial Guinea.) Annette Jacky Messomo (Note: On October 17, 2018, CAF declared her ineligible to play for Equatorial Guinea.)
- Italy: Pamela Conti
- Jamaica: Omolyn Davis
- Kazakhstan: Irina Saratovtseva
- Moldova: Elena Porosniuc
- Nigeria: Emueje Ogbiagbevha
- Spain: Verónica Boquete
- Ukraine: Yulia Emelyanova, Ludmila Pekur, Veronika Shulga, Iryna Zvarych
- United States: Jenny Benson
