= Anastasia Kostyukova =

Russian footballer (born 1985)

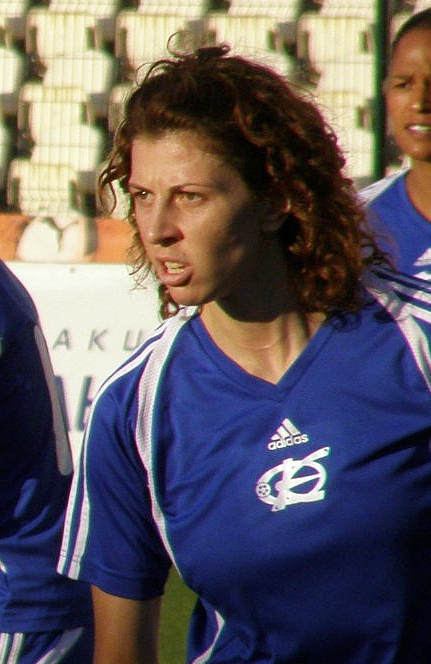

Personal information
- Full name: Anastasia Aleksandrovna Kostyukova
- Date of birth: 15 May 1985 (age 41)
- Place of birth: Soviet Union
- Height: 1.75 m (5 ft 9 in)
- Position: Defender

Senior career*
Years	Team	Apps	(Gls)
2003	Energetik Kislovodsk		
2004	CSK VVS Samara		
2005–2006	Ryazan VDV		
2007	SKA Rostov		
2008	Nadezhda Noginsk		
2009–2012	Energiya Voronezh	59	(1)
2012–2015	FC Zorky Krasnogorsk		

International career^{‡}
2011–2015	Russia	27	(2)
- * Club domestic league appearances and goals ‡ National team caps and goals as of 1.1.2019

Anastasia Kostyukova is a retired Russian football defender, playing for various clubs in Russia including Energiya Voronezh.

She was a member of the Russian national team.

== Goal National Team ==
Date	Opponent	Result	Scorers Anastasia Kostyukova
16.06.2012	Greece	4-0	24'
25.10.2012	Austria	1-1	30'
