= Elena Suslova =

Russian footballer (born 1984)

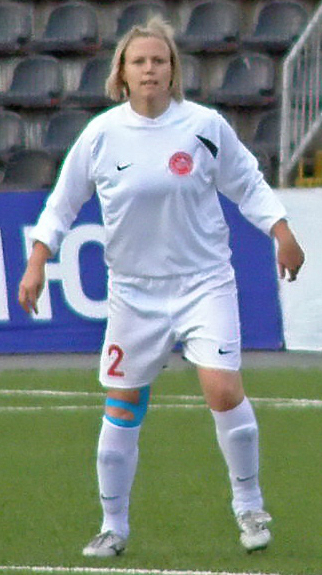

Personal information
- Full name: Elena Suslova
- Date of birth: 15 October 1984 (age 42)
- Place of birth: Krasnoyarsk, Soviet Union
- Height: 1.73 m (5 ft 8 in)
- Position: Defender

Senior career*
Years	Team	Apps	(Gls)
2000–2004	Energiya Voronezh		
2005–2006	Ryazan VDV		
2007–2015	Zvezda Perm		

International career
	Russia	2	(1)
- * Club domestic league appearances and goals

Elena Suslova is a former Russian football defender, who played for Zvezda Perm in the Russian Championship. She has won 5 championships with Energiya Voronezh and Zvezda.

She has been a member of the Russian national team, but missed the 2009 European Championship due to an injury. She played during the 2009 European Championship qualification.

== Titles ==
- 5 Russian Leagues (2002, 2003, 2007, 2008, 2009)
- 2 Russian Cups (2001, 2007)
