= Alla Sidorovskaya =

Russian footballer (born 1983)

Personal information
- Full name: Alla Sidorovskaya
- Date of birth: 27 July 1983 (age 43)
- Place of birth: Moscow, Soviet Union
- Height: 1.75 m (5 ft 9 in)
- Position: Midfielder

Senior career*
Years	Team	Apps	(Gls)
2007–2014	Izmailovo Moscow	42	(6)

International career^{‡}
2006–2014	Russia	12	(0)
- * Club domestic league appearances and goals as of 14 July 2013 ‡ National team caps and goals as of 13:42, 19 July 2013 (UTC)

Alla Sidorovskaya (born Rogova, 27 July 1983) is a former Russian footballer. She played as a midfielder for Izmailovo Moscow and the Russia national team.

== Club career ==
She played for Izmailovo Moscow since 2007.

== International career ==
She took part in UEFA Women's Euro 2009. She was called up to be part of the national team for the UEFA Women's Euro 2013.

Goals scored for the Russian WNT in official competitions
Competition	Stage	Date	Location	Opponent	Goals	Result	Overall
2015 FIFA World Cup	Qualifiers	2014–08–21	Samara	Slovakia	1	3–1	1

== Personal life ==
Sidorovskaya was born in Moscow. She played in the national team under the surname Rogova before her marriage. She suspended the career for two years due to maternity leave.

== Honours ==
Izmailovo Moscow

Runner-up

- Russian Women's Cup: 2013
