= Margarita Shirokova =

Russian footballer (born 1991)

Personal information
- Full name: Margarita Sergeevna Shirokova
- Date of birth: 14 January 1991 (age 35)
- Place of birth: Soviet Union
- Height: 1.69 m (5 ft 6 1/2 in)
- Position: Goalkeeper

Team information
- Current team: Zvezda Perm
- Number: 81

Senior career*
Years	Team	Apps	(Gls)
2009–2010	Zvezda Zvenigorod	25	(0)
2010	Mordovochka		(0)
2011–2012	Zorky	23	(0)
2012–2013	Rossiyanka	4	(0)
2014–2015	Zorky	30	(0)
2017–2018	Yenisey	28	(0)
2019–2021	Ryazan	40	(0)
2022–	Zvezda Perm	73	(0)

International career
2011–2013	Russia U19	7	(0)
- * Club domestic league appearances and goals as of 1 June 2025

Margarita Shirokova is a Russian football goalkeeper, currently playing for Zvezda Perm in the Russian Championship.

As an Under-19 international she played the 2011 U-19 European Championship.
