= Adriana Parente =

Brazilian footballer (born 1980)

Personal information
- Full name: Adriana Soares Parente
- Date of birth: 14 April 1980 (age 46)
- Place of birth: Taguatinga, Federal District, Brazil
- Height: 1.72 m (5 ft 8 in)
- Position: Centre back

Team information
- Current team: Capital
- Number: 19

Senior career*
Years	Team	Apps	(Gls)
- Flamengo/Tiradentes
- CFZ do Rio
- Palmeiras
- São Francisco do Conde
2007–2009	CRESSPOM		
2010–2012	Energiya Voronezh	29	(3)
2012–2013	São Francisco do Conde		
2013	Zorky Krasnogorsk		
2014	Capital		
2017	CRESSPOM	2	(0)
2018–2019	Minas Icesp	22	(0)
2020	Minas Brasília	2	(0)
2022	Legião	4	(1)
2023–	Capital	4	(0)

International career
2000–2008	Brazil		
2008–2016	Equatorial Guinea		
- * Club domestic league appearances and goals as of 13 May 2023

Adriana Soares Parente (born 14 April 1980), known as Drika, is a Brazilian professional footballer who plays as a centre back for Série A3 club Capital CF. She has been a member of the Brazil women's national team.

== International career ==
Drika was called up to train with the senior Brazil women's national football team in 2000 and 2009.

=== Controversy ===
From 2008 to 2016, Drika made appearances for Equatorial Guinea despite having no connection with the African nation. She was a member of the squads that won two Africa Women Cup of Nations editions (2008 and 2012). On 5 October 2017, she and other nine Brazilian footballers were declared by FIFA as ineligible to play for Equatorial Guinea.
