= Yulia Gordeeva =

Russian footballer (born 1988)

Personal information
- Full name: Yulia Gordeeva
- Date of birth: 5 January 1988 (age 38)
- Place of birth: Moscow, Russia
- Height: 1.74 m (5 ft 8 1/2 in)
- Position: Defender

Team information
- Current team: Chertanovo Moscow

Senior career*
Years	Team	Apps	(Gls)
2010–2014	Izmailovo Moscow	66	(1)
2015–	Chertanovo Moscow	66	(0)

International career^{‡}
2006	Russia U19	2	(2)
2012–2016	Russia	12	(0)
- * Club domestic league appearances and goals as of 13 July 2013 ‡ National team caps and goals as of 13 July 2013

Yulia Gordeeva (born 5 January 1988) is a Russian footballer. For most of her career, she played as a striker, but recently she changed position to play as a defender for Chertanovo Moscow and the Russia national team.

== Club career ==
She played for Izmailovo Moscow in the Russian Women's Football Championship since 2010.

== International career ==
She was called up to be part of the national team for the UEFA Women's Euro 2013.

== Honours ==
Izmailovo Moscow

Runner-up

- Russian Women's Cup: 2013
