= Ekaterina Sochneva =

Russian footballer (born 1985)

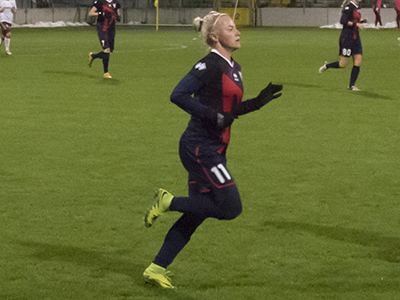

Personal information
- Full name: Ekaterina Aleksandrovna Sochneva
- Date of birth: 12 August 1985 (age 41)
- Place of birth: Moscow, Soviet Union
- Position: Midfielder

Team information
- Current team: Zenit
- Number: 11

Senior career*
| Years | Team | Apps | (Gls) |
- Gömrükçü Baku
- Spartak Moscow
| 2009–2010 | Izmailovo | 28 | (2) |
| 2011–2015 | Zorkiy Krasnogorsk | 94 | (22) |
| 2016 | Rossiyanka | 7 | (0) |
| 2017–2020 | CSKA Moscow | 42 | (2) |
| 2020– | Zenit | 28 | (2) |

International career^{‡}
| 2002–2004 | Russia U19 | 11 | (3) |
| 2009–2018 | Russia | 82 | (17) |
- * Club domestic league appearances and goals ‡ National team caps and goals as of 12:45, 4 June 2019 (UTC)

Ekaterina Aleksandrovna Sochneva (Russian: Екатерина Александровна Сочнева) is a Russian international football midfielder playing for Zenit Saint Petersburg in the Russian Championship.

She previously played for Gömrükçü Baku in Azerbaijan and Spartak Moscow, ShVSM Izmailovo, Zorkiy Krasnogorsk and FK Rossiyanka in Russia before moving to CSKA in 2017.

== Results ==
Goals scored for the Italian WNT in official competitions
| Competition | Stage | Date | Location | Opponent | Goals | Result | Overall |
|---|---|---|---|---|---|---|---|
| 2011 FIFA World Cup | Qualifiers | 2010–06–24 | Krasnoarmeysk | Israel | 1 | 4–0 | 3 |
| 2011 FIFA World Cup | Qualifiers | 2010–08–25 | Krasnoarmeysk | Kazakhstan | 2 | 8–0 | 3 |
| 2013 UEFA Euro | Qualifiers | 2011–09–21 | Racibórz | Poland | 1 | 2–0 ^{1} | 3 |
| 2013 UEFA Euro | Qualifiers | 2011–11–19 | Ano Liossia | Greece | 1 | 4–0 | 3 |
| 2013 UEFA Euro | Qualifiers | 2012–06–16 | Krasnoarmeysk | Greece | 1 | 4–0 | 3 |
| 2015 FIFA World Cup | Qualifiers | 2014–05–07 | Dublin | Republic of Ireland | 1 | 3–1 | 1 |
| 2017 UEFA Euro | Qualifiers | 2016–09–20 | Khimki | Croatia | 1 | 5–0 | 1 |

^{1} The scoreline was subsequently changed for a 3–0 default win.
