= Irina Saratovtseva =

Kazakhstani footballer

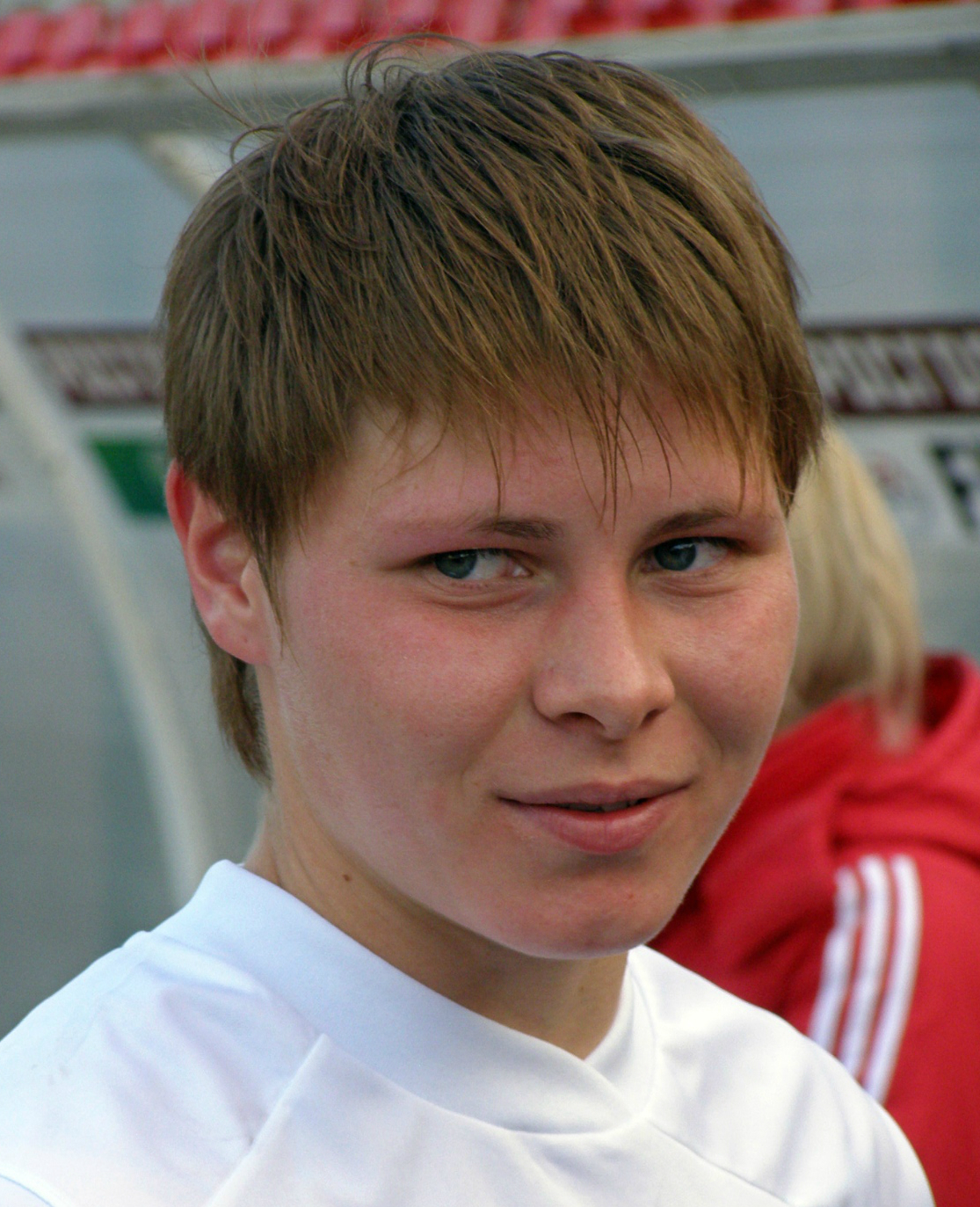

Personal information
- Date of birth: 23 July 1989 (age 37)
- Place of birth: Alma-Ata, Soviet Union (now Almaty, Kazakhstan)
- Height: 1.80 m (5 ft 11 in)
- Position: Goalkeeper

Team information
- Current team: SDYUSSHOR №8

Senior career*
Years	Team	Apps	(Gls)
2002–2006	Akku Astana		
2006–2009	Alma KTZh		
2009–2010	Zvezda Perm	5	(0)
2010	Sporting Huelva		
2011–2012	Energiya Voronezh	3	(0)
2012	Alfa-09 Kaliningrad		
2013–20??	Zvezda Perm	19	(0)
20??–	SDYUSSHOR №8		

International career
- Kazakhstan
- * Club domestic league appearances and goals

Irina Saratovtseva (Russian: Ирина Саратовцева; born 23 July 1989) is a Kazakhstani footballer who plays as a goalkeeper for SDYUSSHOR №8 and the Kazakhstan women's national team.

== Club career ==
Saratovtseva started her club career in 2002 in the Kazakhstani championship, playing for Akcu Astana and, since 2006, for Alma KTZh, with which she won four championships and made her UEFA Women's Cup debut in 2008.

In 2009, she signed for Zvezda Perm, with which she won the Russian championship and was the reserve goalkeeper in the 2009 UEFA Women's Cup Final.

In 2010, she moved to Spain to play for Sporting Huelva in the Superliga. She left the team in the winter break, and signed for Energiya Voronezh back in Russia. After Energiya renounced its position in the top championship for financial reasons Saratovtseva signed for the second-tier team Alfa-09 Kaliningrad.

In 2013, she returned to Zvezda Perm, this time as a starter.

== International career ==
In 2006, Saratovtseva started playing for the Kazakhstani under-19 national team. She was the first choice goalkeeper of Kazakhstan senior team in the 2011 World Cup qualifiers. She lost her position in the national team through the 2013 Euro qualifiers.
