= Gocha Mikadze =

Georgian footballer and coach

Personal information
- Full name: Gocha Sergeyevich Mikadze
- Date of birth: 7 September 1965 (age 61)
- Place of birth: Tskaltubo, Georgian SSR
- Date of death: 7 August 2017 (aged 51)
- Height: 1.91 m (6 ft 3 in)
- Position: Goalkeeper

Senior career*
Years	Team	Apps	(Gls)
1983–1987	FC Torpedo Kutaisi	36	(0)
1988	FC Dinamo Tbilisi	0	(0)
1988–1989	FC Shadrevani Tskaltubo		
1990–1993	FC Samgurali Tskaltubo	120	(0)
1993–1994	FC Samtredia	28	(0)
1995–2000	FC Shakhtyor Shakhty	167	(1)
2001	FC Spartak Anapa	33	(0)
2003–2004	FC Kavkaztransgaz Izobilny	42	(0)
2005	FC SKA Rostov-on-Don	12	(0)

Managerial career
- 2002: FC Shakhtyor Shakhty (assistant)
- 2003: FC Spartak-Kavkaztransgaz Izobilny (assistant)
- 2009–2011: FC SKA Rostov-on-Don (GK coach)
- 2012: FC SKA Rostov-on-Don (assistant)
- * Club domestic league appearances and goals

Gocha Sergeyevich Mikadze (Russian: Гоча Серге́евич Микадзе; born 7 September 1965 in Tskaltubo, died 7 August 2017) was a Georgian professional football coach and a former player. His professional debut was in 1986 in Soviet High League. Last, he worked as an assistant coach at FC SKA Rostov-on-Don. He also held Russian citizenship.
