= Elena Terekhova =

Russian footballer (born 1987)

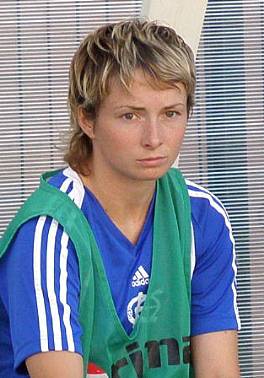

Personal information
- Full name: Elena Terekhova
- Date of birth: 5 July 1987 (age 39)
- Place of birth: Voronezh, Russian SFSR, Soviet Union
- Height: 1.61 m (5 ft 3 in)
- Position: Midfielder

Senior career*
| Years | Team | Apps | (Gls) |
| 2005 | Ryazan | | |
| 2006 | Spartak Moscow | | |
| 2007 | FC Indiana | 17 | (5) |
| 2008–2009 | Rossiyanka | 7 | (2) |
| 2010–2012 | Energiya Voronezh | 50 | (10) |
| 2012–2015 | Ryazan | 65 | (16) |
| 2016 | Rossiyanka | 14 | (2) |
| 2017 | CSKA Moscow | 13 | (0) |
| Total | | 166 | (35) |

International career^{‡}
- Russia U19
| | Russia | 48 | (6) |
- * Club domestic league appearances and goals ‡ National team caps and goals as of 13:43, 19 July 2013 (UTC)

Elena Terekhova (born 5 July 1987) is a former Russian international footballer who played for CSKA Moscow in the Russian Championship. She also played for Ryazan-VDV, Energiya Voronezh, Spartak Moscow, Rossiyanka Krasnoarmeysk and W-League's FC Indiana. Terekhova is a midfielder, but she can also play as a striker.

She has won two Russian league, three Russian cup, the 2007 W-League and the 2005 UEFA U19 Euro, where she scored the first goal in the final against France.

== Titles ==
=== National teams ===
- UEFA U-19 European Championship (1): 2005

=== Clubs ===
- Russian Championship (2): 2013, 2016
- Russian Cup (3): 2008, 2009, 2014
- USL W-League (1): 2007

== Official international goals ==
Goals scored for the Russian WNT in official competitions
| Competition | Stage | Date | Location | Opponent | Goals | Result | Overall |
|---|---|---|---|---|---|---|---|
| 2011 FIFA World Cup | Qualifiers | 2010–03–28 | Taldykorgan | Kazakhstan | 1 | 6–0 | 1 |
| 2013 UEFA Euro | Qualifiers | 2011–11–09 | Ano Liossia | Greece | 1 | 4–0 | 2 |
| 2013 UEFA Euro | First Stage | 2013–07–18 | Norrköping | Spain | 1 | 1–1 | 2 |
| 2015 FIFA World Cup | Qualifiers | 2014–09–17 | Zagreb | Croatia | 1 | 3–1 | 1 |
| 2017 UEFA Euro | Qualifiers | 2016–04–12 | Saint Petersburg | Hungary | 2 | 3–3 | 2 |
