= Natalia Anoikina =

Russian basketball player

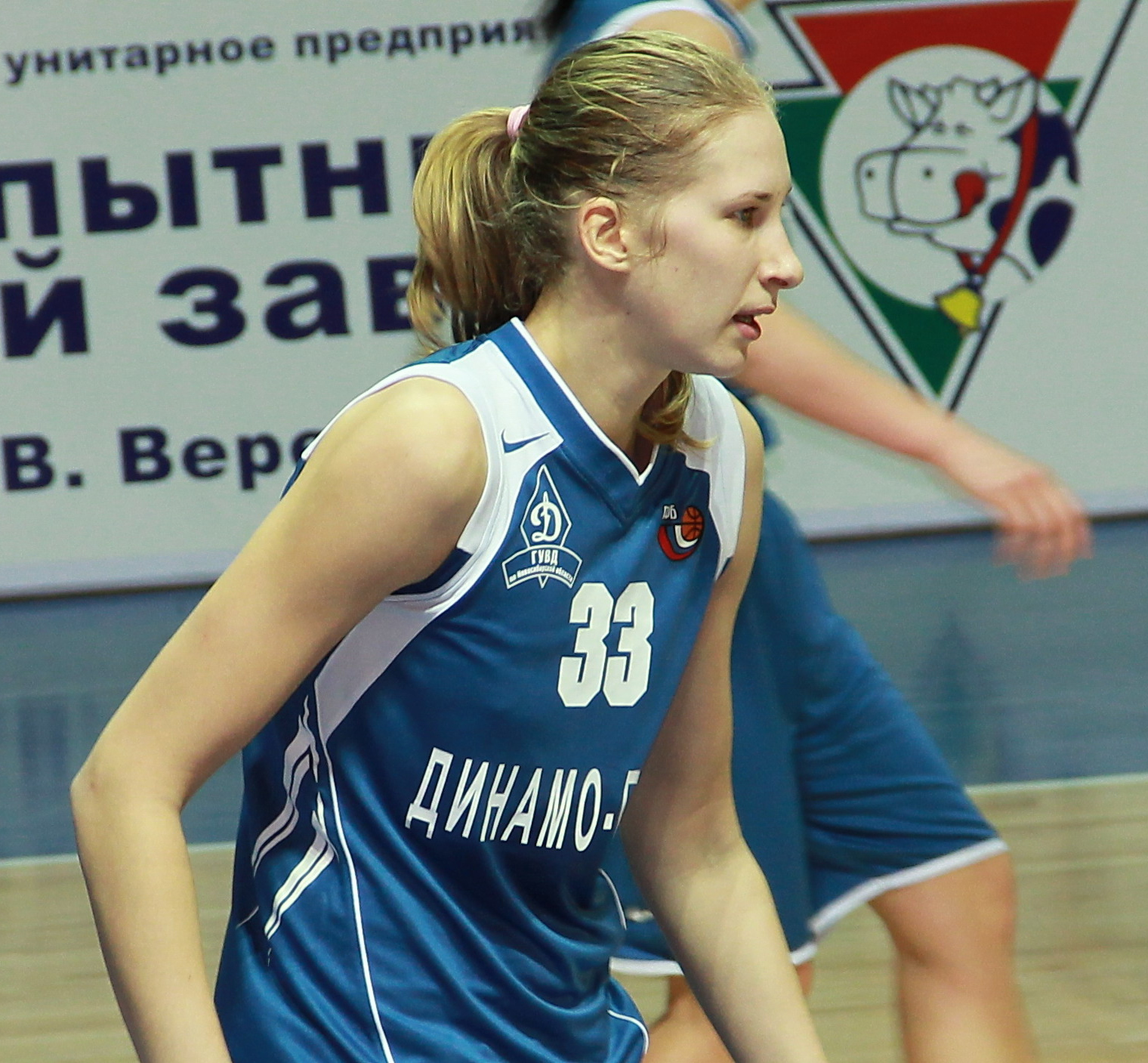
- Myasoedova in 2012

Personal information
- Born: 13 February 1987 (age 39) Krasnoyarsk, Russia
- Height: 196 cm (6 ft 5 in)
- Weight: 82 kg (181 lb)

Sport
- Sport: Basketball
- Club: WBC Dynamo Novosibirsk (2008–2009); Nadezhda Orenburg (2009–2010); WBC Dynamo Novosibirsk (2010–2013); Nadezhda Orenburg (2013–2014); UMMC Ekaterinburg (2014–2015); Nadezhda Orenburg (2015–)
Medal record
Representing Russia
European Championships
Gold medal – first place	2011 Poland	Team

Natalia Valeryevna Anoikina Russian: Наталья Валерьевна Анойкина; born 13 February 1987), née Natalia Anoikina (Russian: Наталья Анойкина), is a Russian basketball center. She was part of the Russian team that won the 2011 European Championships. At the club level, her teams placed second at the 2009–10 EuroCup and 2014–15 EuroLeague.

Myasoyedova was born in a family of medical doctors and took up basketball only around the age of 17. She is married to the volleyball player Sergey Anoikin.
