= Alexander Semin =

Russian ice hockey player (born 1984)

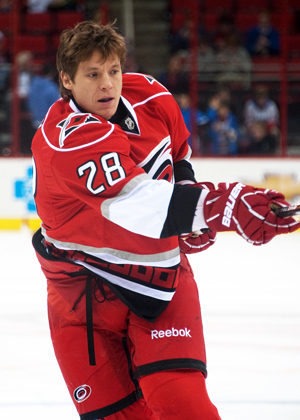
- Semin with the Carolina Hurricanes in February 2013
- Born: 3 March 1984 (age 42) Krasnoyarsk, Russian SFSR, Soviet Union
- Height: 6 ft 2 in (188 cm)
- Weight: 212 lb (96 kg; 15 st 2 lb)
- Position: Right wing
- Shot: Right
- Played for: Lada Togliatti; Washington Capitals; Khimik Moscow Oblast; Torpedo Nizhny Novgorod; Carolina Hurricanes; Montreal Canadiens; Metallurg Magnitogorsk; HC Vityaz
- National team: Russia
- NHL draft: 13th overall, 2002; Washington Capitals
- Playing career: 2001–2022

Alexander Valeryevich Semin (Russian: Александр Валерьевич Сёмин, Russian pronunciation: [ɐlʲɪˈksandr sʲɵˈmʲin]; born 3 March 1984) is a Russian former professional ice hockey winger. He last played with HC Vityaz of the Kontinental Hockey League (KHL) the top league in Russia. He previously played in the National Hockey League (NHL) for the Washington Capitals, Carolina Hurricanes and Montreal Canadiens.

== Playing career ==
=== Early career ===
Semin was trained in the Traktor Chelyabinsk hockey school and made his professional debut in Russia's second-tier Russian Major League in 2001–02. After scoring 13 goals and 8 assists with Chelyabinsk that season, the Washington Capitals selected Semin in the first round, 13th overall, at the 2002 NHL entry draft (Washington's second overall pick, having drafted Steve Eminger 12th overall). Remaining in Russia for the subsequent season, he joined Lada Togliatti of the first-tier Russian Superleague (RSL) in 2002–03 and scored 10 goals and 7 assists in 47 games.

Semin made his NHL debut in the 2003–04 season, scoring 10 goals and 12 assists in 52 games. However, he missed his team's flight to Pittsburgh when the Capitals closed out their season against the Pittsburgh Penguins. Semin then reported to Maine to play for the American Hockey League (AHL)'s Portland Pirates, where he collected 15 points in 4 regular season and 7 playoff games.

=== Military duty controversy ===
During the 2004–05 NHL lockout, Semin returned to Russia and played 50 games for Lada Togliatti, recording 19 goals and 11 assists and compiling a plus-minus rating of +15. The Capitals suspended him for that whole season for not reporting to their then-AHL affiliate, the Portland Pirates, preferring the club's younger players to play the locked-out season with their farm team. (Alexander Ovechkin, meanwhile, the Capitals' 2004 first-round pick, remained with his Russian club, Dynamo Moscow, because the Capitals felt he would have been ready to play in the NHL.)

Due to confusion about Semin's obligations to the Armed Forces of the Russian Federation, which requires all Russian men to serve two years, Semin was not allowed to return to the Capitals when NHL resumed the following season in 2005–06. Russian Armed Forces allow conscripted soldiers who are hockey players to play for professional teams in Russia during their period of service, but they are not allowed to play for teams based in other countries. However, other young Russian players, such as Nikolay Zherdev and Alexander Ovechkin, were allowed to return to their NHL clubs following the lockout, circumventing any additional military duty they had to serve in Russia.

While Semin's 2004–05 season with Lada was considered his first year of military service, it was arranged for Semin to continue with Lada for his second year of service in 2005–06. Lada is located in the military district into which Semin was drafted, and they were the only team with whom Semin could fulfill his military obligation. He was signed to a tax-free, $2 million contract, along with a car and a condominium. News about Lada's struggling financial situation early in the season initially offered the Capitals some hope that Semin would join the team after all. It was reported the Russian team was expected to cut its payroll in half, while Semin was Lada's highest paid player.

On 26 October 2005, Capitals general manager George McPhee announced the Capitals had filed a complaint against Semin and his agent, Mark Gandler. McPhee stated, "We have done everything we could to avoid this step, but we felt we had no choice but to now seek a legal remedy. This filing seeks to compel Alexander Semin's agent and the Russian hockey team Lada Togliatti to return Alex to the Washington Capitals... We look forward to the resolution of this process so that we can welcome Alex back to the Capitals this season." Likewise, NHL commissioner Gary Bettman said, "This is a situation where a valid, legally-binding contract is not being honored, and that's not right." U.S. District Court Judge Henry H. Kennedy, Jr., issued a temporary restraining order on 4 November 2005 ordering Gandler and his International Sports Advisors Company to stop representing Semin in contracts with teams other than the Capitals. Due to Lada Togliatti's financial challenges, Lada released Semin, but he instead signed with Russian squad Mytischi Khimik on 22 November.

On 5 December 2005, Kennedy denied the Capitals request for preliminary injunctions against Semin and Gandler. Alexander Berkovich, Semin's lawyer, stated Semin intended to play for Khimik for the remainder of the 2005–06 season, and that Semin's military obligations would be fulfilled by fall 2006. He completed the campaign with 9 points in 15 games with Lada and 10 points in 26 games with Khimik.

=== Return to the NHL/Years in Washington ===
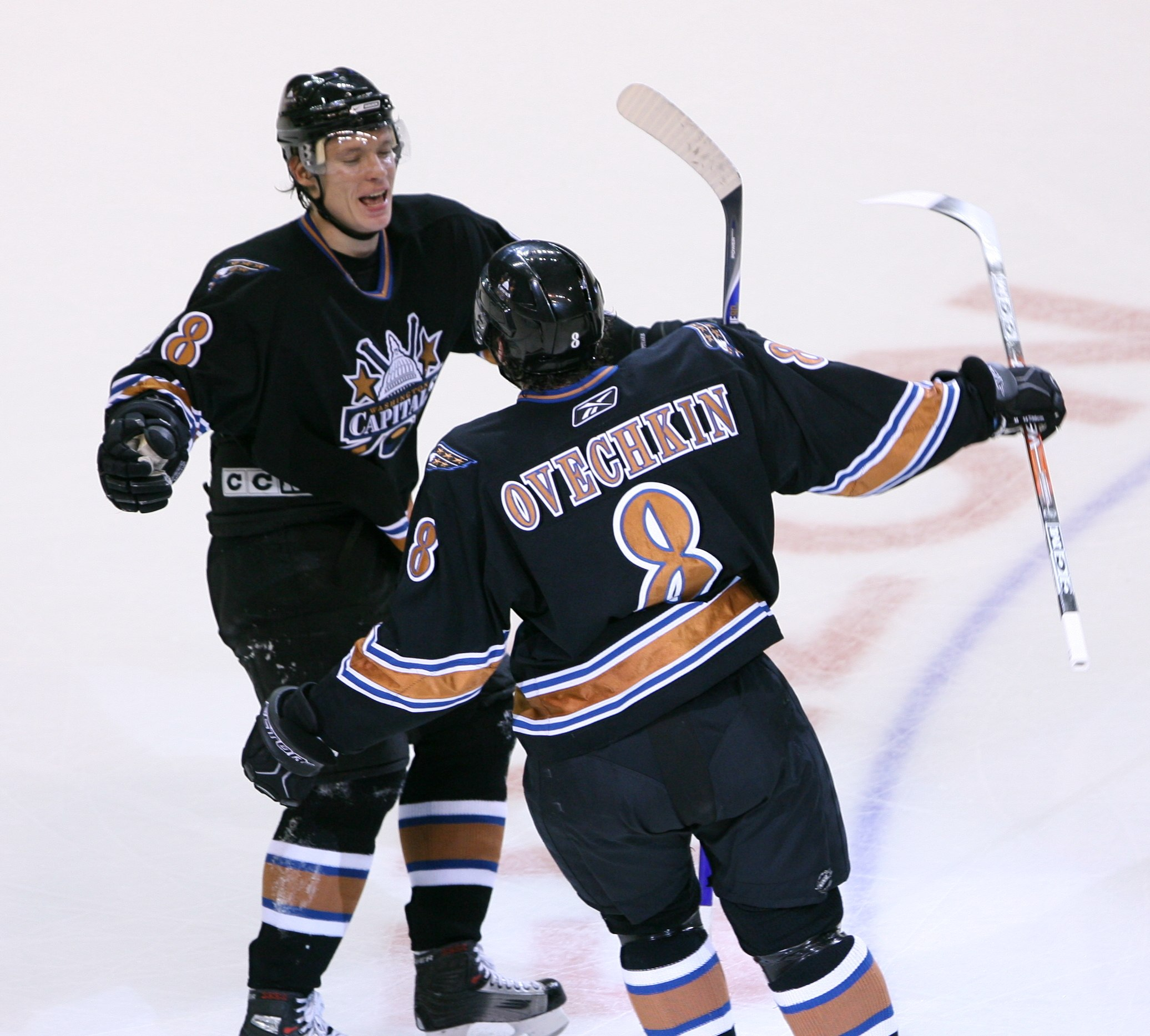
Semin celebrating with Alexander Ovechkin during a game in January 2007

With Semin's military obligations fulfilled, he agreed to a two-year contract with the Capitals on 11 April 2006, resolving the conflict between the two parties. Playing in his first game for the Capitals in two years, Semin scored the team's first goal of the 2006–07 season against the New York Rangers on 5 October 2006. In his next game, against the Carolina Hurricanes, he recorded a hat-trick. On 18 March 2007, Semin tallied the second natural hat-trick of his career against the Tampa Bay Lightning, scoring three goals on three successive shots in a span of 7:04 in the second period. Late in the season, Capitals' head coach Glen Hanlon started Ovechkin and Semin together on the powerplay and occasionally on the team's first scoring line. Ovechkin and Semin finished as the team's top two scorers, and Semin soon became known as "The Other Alex". He completed the season with 38 goals (13th in NHL scoring) and 73 points in 77 games, missing five games to an injury early in the season. Semin was one of three 30-goal scorers for the Capitals for the season, along with Ovechkin and captain Chris Clark.

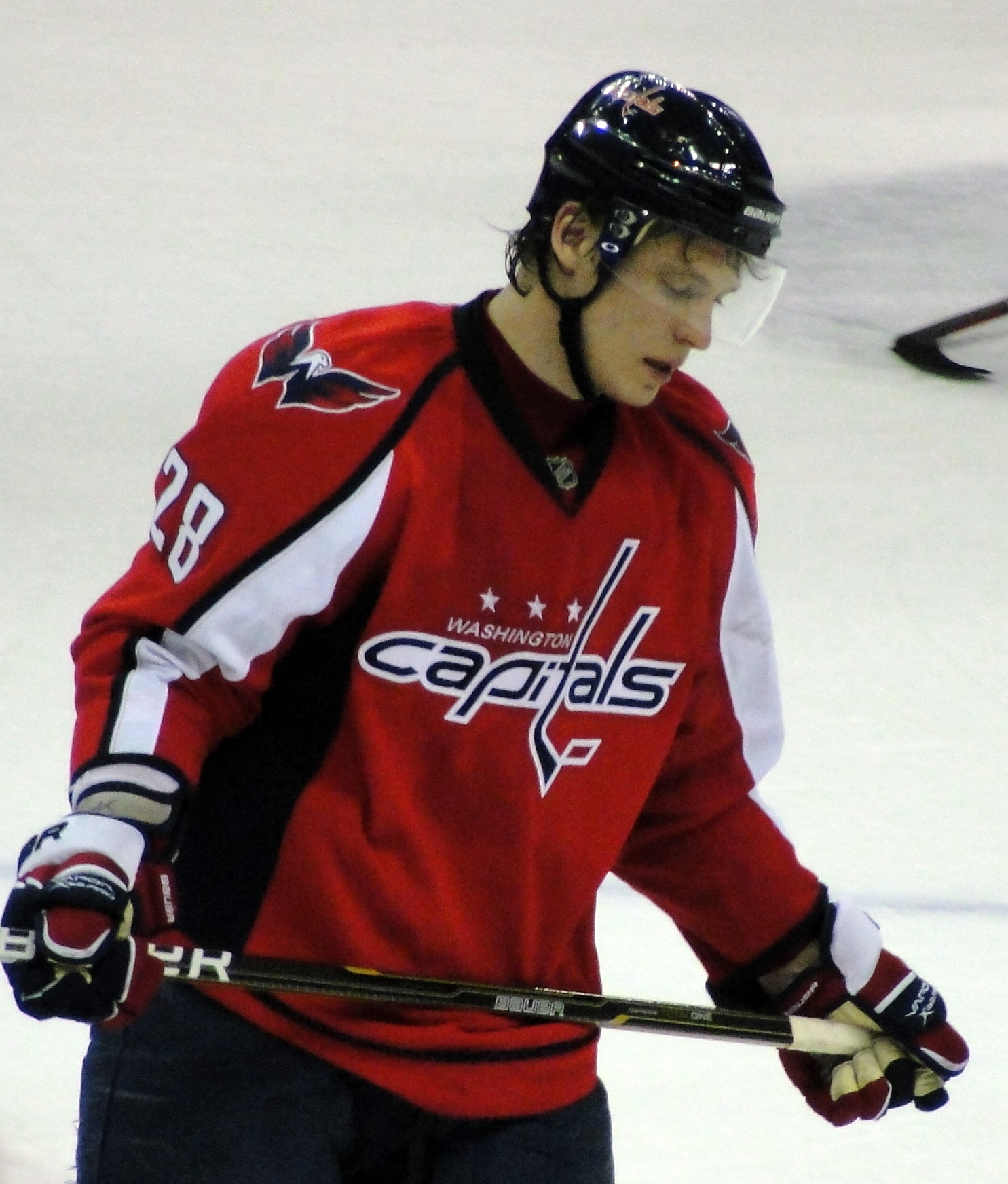
Semin with the Capitals in May 2011

After a successful NHL comeback in 2006–07, Semin struggled in comparison during the 2007–08 season, scoring 42 points while being sidelined for 19 games. Along with Ovechkin and second-year forward Nicklas Bäckström, Semin helped form a highly offensive core with the Capitals in 2008–09. On 3 March 2009, Semin's 25th birthday, he scored his 100th career goal, against Carolina Hurricanes goaltender Cam Ward. Semin spent much of the first couple months of the season as the NHL's top point-scorer, but tailed off as he began to experience injury troubles. Regardless, he finished with a career-high 79 points in just 62 games, third in Capitals scoring behind Ovechkin and Bäckström. In the 2009 Stanley Cup playoffs, Semin added 14 points in 14 games, including a three-point effort (two goals and an assist) on 20 April 2009, leading the Capitals to a crucial playoff win against the New York Rangers in Game 3 of the opening round.

Midway through the 2009–10 season, Semin signed a one-year, $6 million contract extension with the Capitals.

Semin played for Russia in the 2010 Winter Olympics.

In Washington's 2010 quarter-final match-up against the Montreal Canadiens, Semin received large amounts of criticism due to his poor play, as he did not score any goals despite firing 44 shots on Canadiens goaltender Jaroslav Halák. He finished the series with just two assists in seven games as Montreal upset Washington 4–3 in the series, with the Capitals blowing a 3–1 series lead.

Semin signed another one-year extension with the Washington Capitals on 27 January 2011, worth $6.7 million. He became an unrestricted free agent on 1 July 2012.

On 5 April 2012, Semin became the fifth-highest all-time leading goal scorer of the Capitals with his 197th goal.

=== Carolina Hurricanes ===
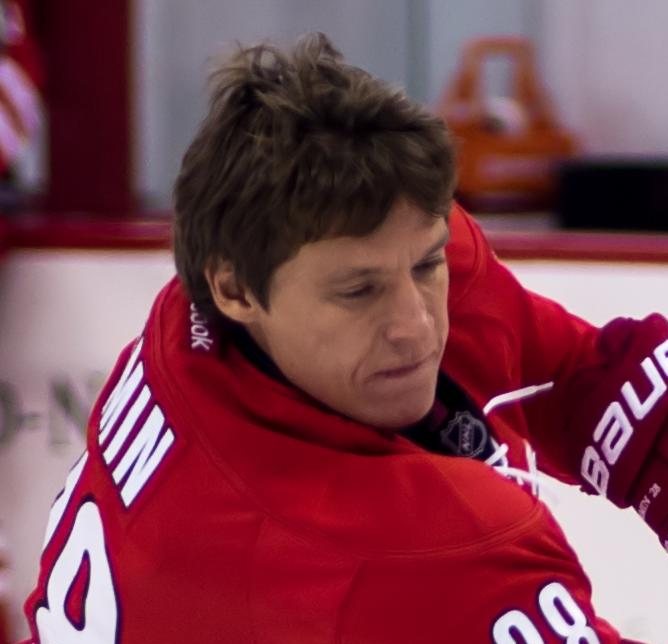
Semin with the Hurricanes in October 2013

On 26 July 2012, the Carolina Hurricanes signed Semin to a one-year, $7 million contract.

On 25 September 2012, it was announced that for the time of 2012–13 NHL lockout, Semin would sign with Sokol Krasnoyarsk of the Russian Major League, the Russian second-tier hockey division. He would wear jersey number 28 with the club. Despite the fact he had offers from top-level Kontinental Hockey League (KHL) clubs, he chose to play for a club from his hometown for free. However, after playing four games with Sokol, Semin signed a contract with Torpedo Nizhny Novgorod of the KHL. The president of Torpedo, Oleg Kondrashov, praised Semin for joining Sokol at first, saying, "The player's decision to pay tribute to the team that brought him up does credit to him," though he also added, "But a player of such high level should play in KHL."

Semin scored his 200th career goal on 11 February 2013, helping his team to a 6–4 victory over the New York Islanders. On 25 March 2013, the Hurricanes signed Semin to a five-year, $35 million contract extension.

On 30 June 2015, Semin was waived by the Hurricanes with the intent of him being bought out.

=== Montreal Canadiens ===
On 24 July 2015, Semin signed a one-year, $1.1 million contract with the Montreal Canadiens. He was then waived by the Canadiens in December. After going unclaimed, Semin refused to report to the AHL and sought a contract termination the following day.

=== Return to Russia ===
On 15 December 2015, Semin returned to play in his native Russia, signing for the remainder of the season with Metallurg Magnitogorsk of the KHL. Metallurg Magnitogorsk won the Gagarin Cup on 19 April 2016. He was named, twice, on the list of most beautiful goals.

On 28 May 2016, Semin agreed to a one-year contract extension with Metallurg Magnitogorsk. In July 2017, Semin enrolled in a metallurgy course at Siberian Federal University, but continued his career with Sokol Krasnoyarsk of the Supreme Hockey League, the second-highest Russian hockey league.

On 8 May 2018, Semin signed a one-year contract with HC Vityaz, marking his return to the KHL.

He announced his retirement from professional hockey on May 18, 2022.

== Personal life ==
In 2014, Semin married his fiancée Alena and on 19 August 2015, she gave birth to a son. In 2017, they had their second son, Danil.

== Career statistics ==
=== Regular season and playoffs ===
			Regular season					Playoffs
Season	Team	League	GP	G	A	Pts	PIM	GP	G	A	Pts	PIM
2000–01	Traktor–2 Chelyabinsk	RUS.3	4	1	0	1	14	—	—	—	—	—
2001–02	Traktor Chelyabinsk	RUS.2	46	13	8	21	52	—	—	—	—	—
2001–02	Traktor–2 Chelyabinsk	RUS.3	2	4	0	4	4	—	—	—	—	—
2002–03	Lada Togliatti	RSL	47	10	7	17	36	10	5	3	8	10
2002–03	Lada–2 Togliatti	RUS.3	2	0	0	0	2	—	—	—	—	—
2003–04	Washington Capitals	NHL	52	10	12	22	36	—	—	—	—	—
2003–04	Portland Pirates	AHL	4	3	1	4	6	7	4	7	11	19
2004–05	Lada Togliatti	RSL	50	19	11	30	56	10	1	1	2	0
2004–05	Lada–2 Togliatti	RUS.3	1	1	2	3	0	—	—	—	—	—
2005–06	Lada Togliatti	RSL	16	5	4	9	52	—	—	—	—	—
2005–06	Lada–2 Togliatti	RUS.3	2	2	0	2	4	—	—	—	—	—
2005–06	Khimik Moscow Oblast	RSL	26	3	7	10	26	8	3	2	5	6
2006–07	Washington Capitals	NHL	77	38	35	73	90	—	—	—	—	—
2007–08	Washington Capitals	NHL	63	26	16	42	54	7	3	5	8	8
2008–09	Washington Capitals	NHL	62	34	45	79	77	14	5	9	14	16
2009–10	Washington Capitals	NHL	73	40	44	84	66	7	0	2	2	4
2010–11	Washington Capitals	NHL	65	28	26	54	71	9	4	2	6	8
2011–12	Washington Capitals	NHL	77	21	33	54	56	14	3	1	4	10
2012–13	Sokol Krasnoyarsk	VHL	4	2	2	4	8	—	—	—	—	—
2012–13	Torpedo Nizhny Novgorod	KHL	20	7	10	17	10	—	—	—	—	—
2012–13	Carolina Hurricanes	NHL	44	13	31	44	14	—	—	—	—	—
2013–14	Carolina Hurricanes	NHL	65	22	20	42	42	—	—	—	—	—
2014–15	Carolina Hurricanes	NHL	57	6	13	19	32	—	—	—	—	—
2015–16	Montreal Canadiens	NHL	15	1	3	4	12	—	—	—	—	—
2015–16	Metallurg Magnitogorsk	KHL	20	5	9	14	43	23	7	8	15	20
2016–17	Metallurg Magnitogorsk	KHL	58	16	14	30	38	18	0	2	2	20
2017–18	Sokol Krasnoyarsk	VHL	31	8	20	28	30	8	5	3	8	36
2018–19	HC Vityaz	KHL	54	19	22	41	43	4	0	1	1	4
2019–20	HC Vityaz	KHL	50	18	20	38	69	—	—	—	—	—
2020–21	HC Vityaz	KHL	40	8	11	19	38	—	—	—	—	—
NHL totals			650	239	278	517	582	51	15	19	34	46
KHL totals			242	73	86	159	241	45	7	11	18	44

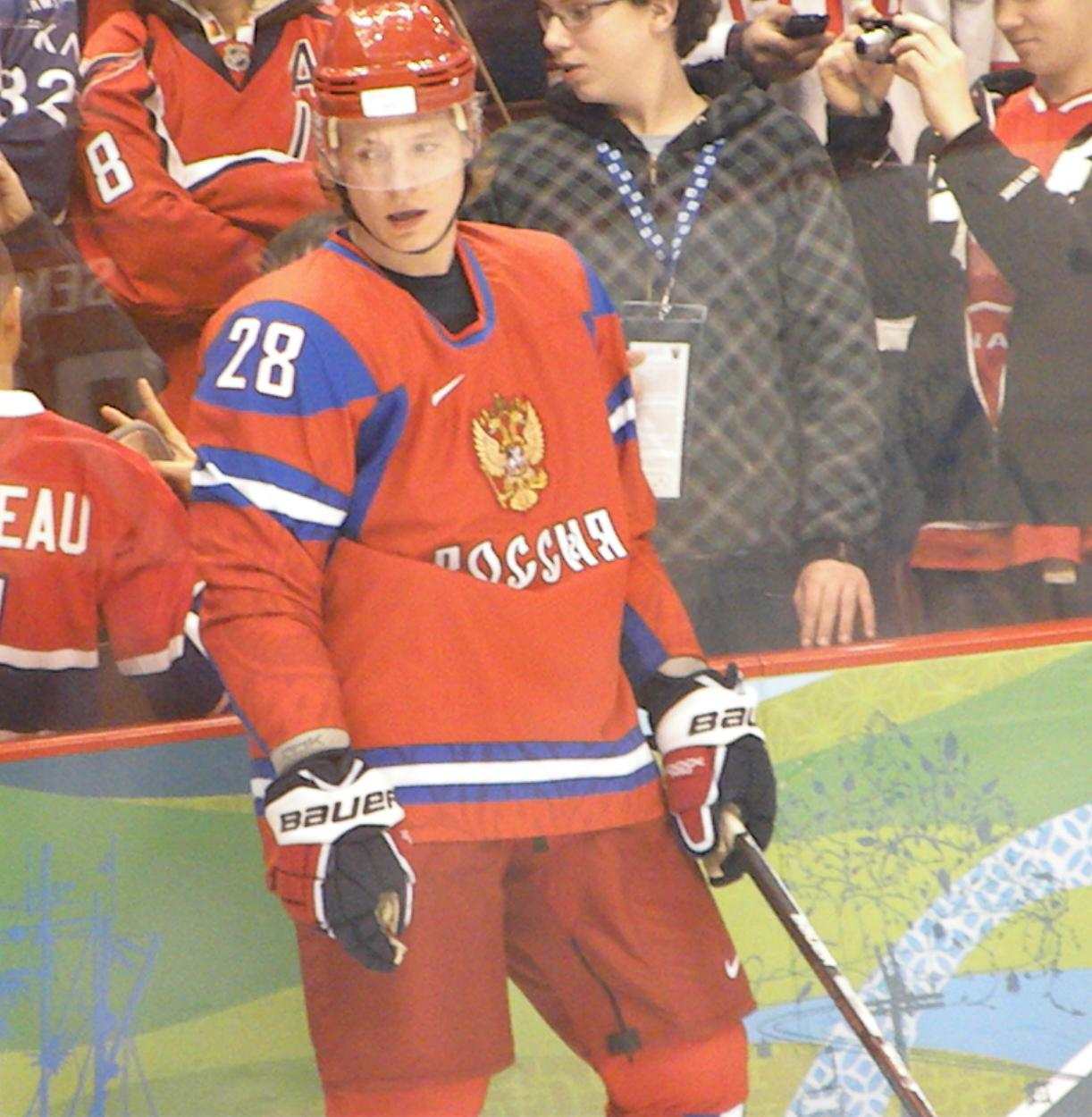
- Semin at the 2010 Winter Olympics

Medal record

Representing Russia

Ice hockey

World Championships
Gold medal – first place	2012 Helsinki	
Silver medal – second place	2010 Germany	
Gold medal – first place	2008 Quebec City	
Bronze medal – third place	2005 Vienna	

=== International ===
Year	Team	Event	Result	GP	G	A	Pts	PIM
2002	Russia	WJC18	2nd place, silver medalist(s)	8	8	7	15	16
2003	Russia	WC	5th	6	0	0	0	0
2004	Russia	WJC	5th	6	2	2	4	10
2005	Russia	WC	3rd place, bronze medalist(s)	6	3	0	3	8
2006	Russia	WC	5th	7	3	3	6	8
2008	Russia	WC	1st place, gold medalist(s)	9	6	7	13	8
2010	Russia	OG	6th	4	0	2	2	4
2010	Russia	WC	2nd place, silver medalist(s)	8	1	4	5	12
2012	Russia	WC	1st place, gold medalist(s)	3	2	3	5	0
2014	Russia	OG	5th	5	0	1	1	0
Junior totals				14	10	9	19	26
Senior totals				48	15	20	35	40

== Awards and honors ==
Award	Year
KHL
Gagarin Cup (Metallurg Magnitogorsk)	2016
Sergei Gimayev Prize (Top Veteran Player)	2020

Awards and achievements
Preceded by Steve Eminger	Washington Capitals first-round draft pick 2002	Succeeded by Boyd Gordon
