= Sokol Krasnoyarsk =

- City: Krasnoyarsk, Russia
- League: VHL; 2011–present: Pervaya Liga 1996–1997, 2003–2011; Vysshaya Liga 1992–1996; Soviet League Class A3 1977–1992
- Conference: 2
- Division: D
- Founded: 1977
- Home arena: Arena Sever (2,600 seats)
- Colours
- General manager: Alexej Jaškin
- Head coach: Pavel Desyatkov
- Affiliates: Amur Khabarovsk (KHL); Amurskie Tigry (MHL)
- Website: krsksoko.ru

Sokol Krasnoyarsk is an ice hockey team from Krasnoyarsk, Russia. They play in the VHL, the second level of Russian ice hockey. The club was founded in 1977.

In 2012, Sokol signed Krasnoyarsk native NHL star Alexander Semin for the time of the NHL lockout. Semin decided to play for free as Sokol is his hometown team and the club he began his career with. However, after just four games with Sokol, Semin signed with Torpedo Nizhny Novgorod of the top-level Kontinental Hockey League.

== Rivalries ==
Sokol's games against the regional rival HC Norilsk have been called "the Frosty Derby" (Russian: "Морозное дерби").

== Season-by-season VHL record ==
Note: GP = Games played, W = Wins, OTW = Overtime Wins, SOW = Penalty Shootout Wins, SOL = Penalty Shootout Losses, L = Losses, GF = Goals for, GA = Goals against, Pts = Points

Records as of March 9, 2017

Season	GP	W	OTW	SOW	SOL	OTL	L	GF	GA	Pts	Finish	Playoffs
2011–12	53	14	1	5	3	2	28	139	178	59	5th, Division D	Did not qualify
2012–13	52	11	2	6	4	2	27	113	152	55	24th in VHL	Did not qualify
2013–14	50	19	1	5	5	1	19	109	110	75	16th in VHL	Lost to Toros Neftekamsk 0-4 in Round 1
2014–15	52	17	0	4	6	2	23	109	130	67	22nd in VHL	Did not qualify
2015–16	49	16	0	3	5	5	20	107	123	64	18th in VHL	Did not qualify
2016–17	50	22	1	7	3	2	15	113	101	87	9th in VHL	Lost to Zauralie Kurgan 3-4 in Round 1
