= Nadezhda Bosikova =

Russian footballer and coach (born 1972)

Nadezhda Bosikova Надежда Босикова
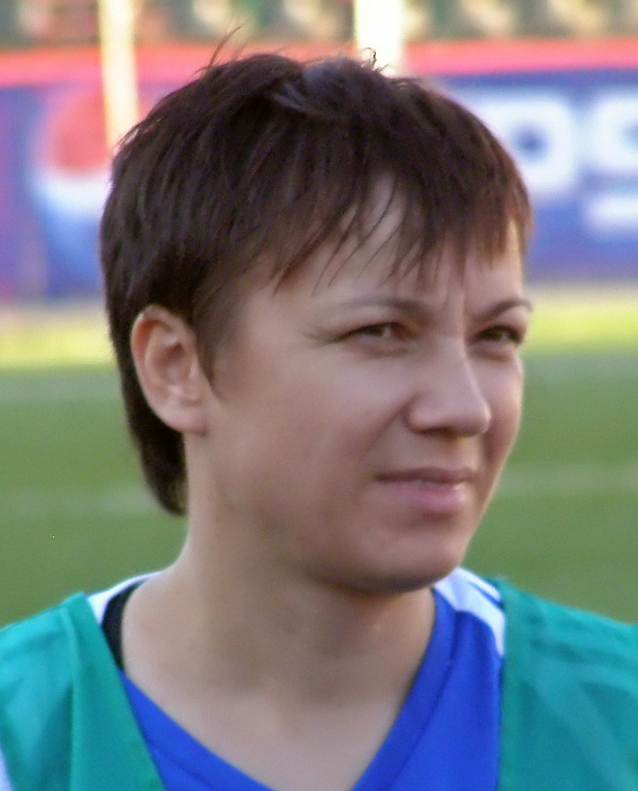

Personal information
- Full name: Nadezhda Timofeevna Bosikova
- Date of birth: 17 June 1972 (age 54)
- Place of birth: Pavlodar, Kazakh SSR, Soviet Union
- Height: 1.64 m (5 ft 5 in)
- Position: Forward

Senior career*
Years	Team	Apps	(Gls)
- Yunost Poltava
1992–2012	Energiya Voronezh		

International career
	Russia	28	(18)
- * Club domestic league appearances and goals

Nadezhda Timofeevna Bosikova (Russian: Надежда Тимофеевна Босикова; born 17 June 1972) is a Russian football coach and former player. As a forward, she played for Energiya Voronezh since the Russian Championship's inaugural edition in 1992 and was affectionately nicknamed "Barefoot" (Russian: Босик) at the club. She was the championship's top scorer in 1994, 1995, 1996, 1997, 1998 and 2000 with 31, 37, 39, 21, 19 and 30 goals respectively. Bosikova's playing career was interrupted by the birth of her son Matthew (Russian: Матвей). She remained loyal to Energiya in 2004 when a player exodus left her as the only name on the club's roster.

Bosikova represented the Russia women's national football team, scoring 18 goals in her 28 caps. She scored in Russia's play-off victory over Finland in qualifying for the 1999 FIFA Women's World Cup, but was not included in the squad for the final tournament. She also participated in qualifying for the 2003 edition, but missed the final tournament again.

== Titles ==
- 5 Russian Leagues (1995, 1997, 1998, 2002, 2003)
- 7 Russian Cups (1993, 1995, 1996, 1997, 1999, 2000, 2001)
