= Vera Stroukova =

Russian footballer (born 1981)

Personal information
- Date of birth: 6 August 1981 (age 45)
- Position: Defender

International career^{‡}
Years	Team	Apps	(Gls)
	Russia	4	(0)
- ‡ National team caps and goals as of 4 October 2003

Vera Stroukova (born 6 August 1981) is a retired Russian women's international footballer who played as a defender. She was a member of the Russia women's national football team. She was part of the team at the 2003 FIFA Women's World Cup.
