= Elena Medved =

Russian footballer (born 1985)

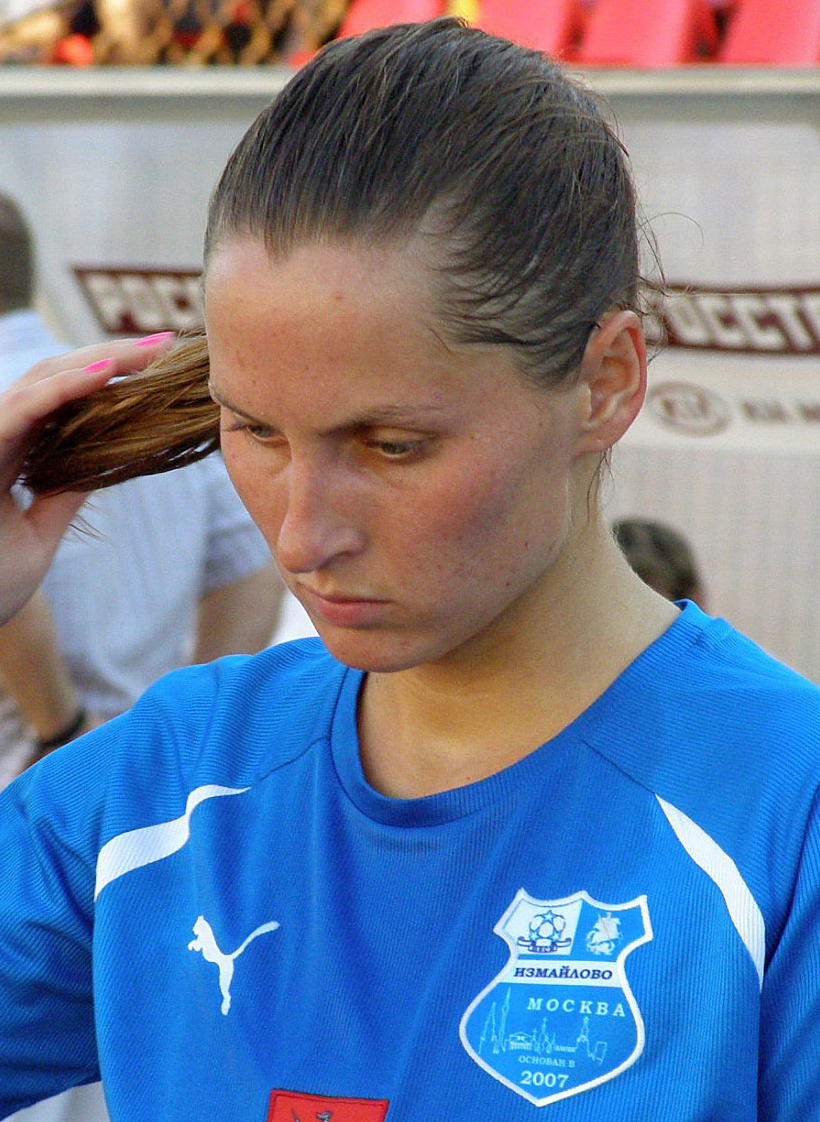

Personal information
- Full name: Elena Medved
- Date of birth: 23 January 1985 (age 41)
- Place of birth: Moscow, Soviet Union
- Height: 1.70 m (5 ft 7 in)
- Position: Defender

Senior career*
Years	Team	Apps	(Gls)
- Chertanovo Spartak Izmailovo
2011–2015	FC Zorky Krasnogorsk	51	(1)
2015–2017	Ryazan		

International career^{‡}
2004–	Russia	44	(2)
- * Club domestic league appearances and goals as of 14 July 2013 ‡ National team caps and goals as of 15:10, 26 July 2014 (UTC)

Elena Medved (née Semenchenko; born 23 January 1985) is a former Russian footballer. She played as a defender for Ryazan and the Russia national team.

== Club career ==
She played for FC Zorky Krasnogorsk since 2011.

== International career ==
She took part in the 2004 FIFA U-19 Women's World Championship. She was called up to be part of the national team for the UEFA Women's Euro 2013.

== Personal life ==
Medved was born in Moscow. She played in the national team under the surname Semenchenko before her marriage.

== Honours ==
FC Zorky Krasnogorsk

Winner

- Supreme Division: 2012–13

Runner-up

- Supreme Division: 2011–12
- Russian Women's Cup: 2012
