= Alexej Jaškin =

Russian-born Czech ice hockey player

- Born: July 22, 1965 (age 61) Krasnoyarsk, Russian SFSR, Soviet Union
- Height: 6 ft 2 in (188 cm)
- Weight: 209 lb (95 kg; 14 st 13 lb)
- Position: Defence
- Shot: Left
- Played for: Khimik Voskresensk; Vsetín
- NHL draft: Undrafted
- Playing career: 1988–2006

Alexej Jaškin (born July 22, 1965) is a Russian-born Czech former professional ice hockey defenceman. He won six Czech Extraliga championships. He is the father of ice hockey player Dmitrij Jaškin.

== Career statistics ==
| | | | Regular season | | | | | Playoffs |
| Season | Team | League | GP | G | A | Pts | PIM | GP | G | A | Pts | PIM |
|---|---|---|---|---|---|---|---|---|---|---|---|---|
| 1982–83 | Sokol Krasnoyarsk | Soviet3 | 4 | 0 | 0 | 0 | 2 | — | — | — | — | — |
| 1983–84 | Sokol Krasnoyarsk | Soviet3 | 53 | 2 | 2 | 4 | 26 | — | — | — | — | — |
| 1984–85 | Sokol Krasnoyarsk | Soviet3 | — | 4 | — | — | — | — | — | — | — | — |
| 1985–86 | Sokol Krasnoyarsk | Soviet3 | — | 11 | — | — | — | — | — | — | — | — |
| 1986–87 | Sokol Krasnoyarsk | Soviet3 | — | 4 | — | — | — | — | — | — | — | — |
| 1986–87 | SKA Novosibirsk | Soviet3 | 36 | 4 | 7 | 11 | 30 | — | — | — | — | — |
| 1987–88 | SKA Novosibirsk | Soviet3 | 33 | 16 | 8 | 24 | 19 | — | — | — | — | — |
| 1988–89 | SKA Novosibirsk | Soviet2 | 27 | 6 | 7 | 13 | 14 | — | — | — | — | — |
| 1988–89 | Khimik Voskresensk | Soviet | 18 | 0 | 3 | 3 | 2 | — | — | — | — | — |
| 1989–90 | Khimik Voskresensk | Soviet | 48 | 6 | 1 | 7 | 34 | — | — | — | — | — |
| 1990–91 | Khimik Voskresensk | Soviet | 43 | 1 | 3 | 4 | 8 | — | — | — | — | — |
| 1991–92 | Khimik Voskresensk | Soviet | 24 | 0 | 0 | 0 | 6 | 6 | 0 | 0 | 0 | 2 |
| 1991–92 | Vyatich Ryazan | Soviet3 | 4 | 0 | 0 | 0 | 0 | — | — | — | — | — |
| 1992–93 | Khimik Voskresensk | Russia | 42 | 5 | 7 | 12 | 22 | 2 | 0 | 0 | 0 | 2 |
| 1993–94 | Khimik Voskresensk | Russia | 10 | 1 | 1 | 2 | 2 | — | — | — | — | — |
| 1993–94 | VHK Vsetín | Czech2 | 39 | 6 | 11 | 17 | — | — | — | — | — | — |
| 1994–95 | VHK Vsetín | Czech | 44 | 5 | 7 | 12 | 58 | 11 | 1 | 1 | 2 | 2 |
| 1995–96 | VHK Vsetín | Czech | 39 | 9 | 13 | 22 | 18 | 13 | 2 | 7 | 9 | 4 |
| 1996–97 | VHK Vsetín | Czech | 44 | 6 | 16 | 22 | 32 | 9 | 3 | 5 | 8 | 10 |
| 1997–98 | VHK Vsetín | Czech | 51 | 4 | 13 | 17 | 60 | 8 | 2 | 1 | 3 | 2 |
| 1998–99 | VHK Vsetín | Czech | 51 | 12 | 17 | 29 | 42 | 12 | 0 | 4 | 4 | 6 |
| 1999–00 | VHK Vsetín | Czech | 48 | 2 | 14 | 16 | 28 | 9 | 1 | 0 | 1 | 2 |
| 2000–01 | VHK Vsetín | Czech | 52 | 6 | 7 | 13 | 24 | 12 | 3 | 1 | 4 | 6 |
| 2001–02 | VHK Vsetín | Czech | — | — | — | — | — | — | — | — | — | — |
| 2002–03 | VHK Vsetín | Czech | 42 | 7 | 12 | 19 | 16 | 4 | 0 | 1 | 1 | 0 |
| 2003–04 | Vsetínská hokejová | Czech | 52 | 7 | 15 | 22 | 48 | — | — | — | — | — |
| 2004–05 | Vsetínská hokejová | Czech | 47 | 0 | 7 | 7 | 61 | — | — | — | — | — |
| 2005–06 | Vsetínská hokejová | Czech | 1 | 0 | 0 | 0 | 0 | — | — | — | — | — |
| 2005–06 | HC Valašské Meziříčí | Czech3 | 22 | 2 | 11 | 13 | 10 | 3 | 1 | 1 | 2 | 0 |
| 2006–07 | HC Valašské Meziříčí | Czech3 | 25 | 3 | 13 | 16 | 10 | — | — | — | — | — |
| Czech totals | | | 471 | 58 | 121 | 179 | 387 | 78 | 12 | 20 | 32 | 32 |
