= Yuz Aleshkovsky =

Russian writer, poet and playwright (1929–2022)

- Юз Алешко́вский
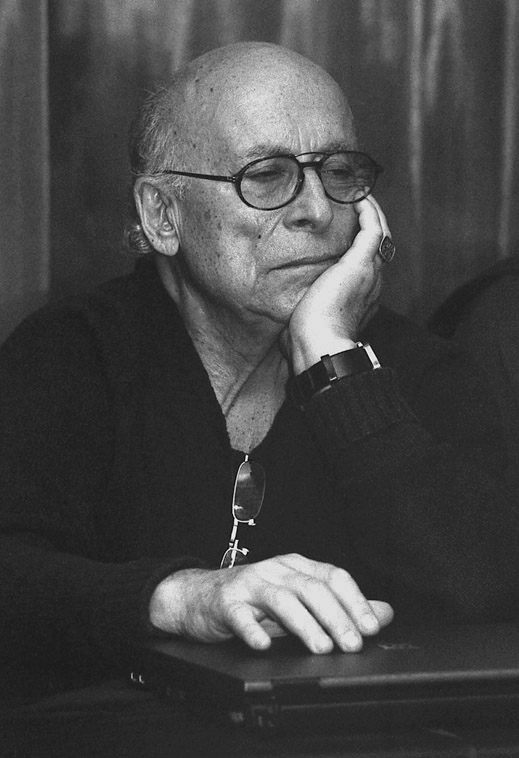
- Aleshkovsky in 2007
- Born: Iosif Efimovich Aleshkovsky; September 21, 1929; Krasnoyarsk, Siberian Krai, Russian SFSR, Soviet Union
- Died: March 21, 2022 (aged 92); Tampa, Florida, U.S.
- Occupations: Writer, poet, bard
- Writing career
- Genres: Prose, poetry, song
- Notable works: Nikolai Nikolaevich, Kangaroo, The Hand, Camouflage
- Literary movement: Modernism

Iosif Efimovich Aleshkovsky (Russian: Ио́сиф Ефи́мович Алешко́вский), known as Yuz Aleshkovsky (Russian: Юз Алешко́вский) (September 21, 1929 – March 21, 2022) was a modern Russian writer, poet, screenwriter, and bard, namely performer of his own songs.

== Biography ==
Yuz Aleshkovsky was born in Krasnoyarsk, Siberia in 1929, when his Russian Jewish family resided there briefly for his father's business. Three months later his family returned to Moscow. His high school studies were interrupted due to his family's evacuation during the Second World War.

In 1949 Aleshkovsky was drafted into the Soviet Navy, but because of breaking the disciplinary code, he had to serve four years in jail (1950–1953). After serving the term, Aleshkovsky moved back to Moscow and began writing books for children.

Aleshkovsky also wrote songs and performed them. Some, especially "Товарищ Сталин, вы большой ученый" (Comrade Stalin, you are a great scholar) and "Окурочек" (Little cigarette butt), became extremely popular in the Soviet Union and are considered folk classics.

Aleshkovsky also wrote screenplays for movies and television and was accepted into the Union of Soviet Writers.

From the very beginning of his career, Aleshkovsky did not compromise his writing to conform to official Soviet doctrine, and for this reason his novellas and novels were available only in samizdat. Some of his songs were included in the subversive self-published almanac Metropol (1979).

With no hope of being published officially in the Soviet Union, Aleshkovsky emigrated to the West in 1979 and waited for his entry visa to the United States in France and Austria. The following year, he was invited to the United States by Wesleyan University and settled in Middletown, Connecticut, where he lived and served as a Visiting Russian Emigre Writer in Wesleyan's Russian Department. In 1987 he was awarded a Guggenheim fellowship for fiction. In 2002 Aleshkovsky won the Pushkin Prize.

== Style and themes ==
Aleshkovsky had a distinct style of writing - a combination of skaz and satire of Soviet social or scientific experiments. The majority of his writings are profoundly witty. The novella Nikolai Nikolaevich mocks Soviet stupidity in pseudoscientific biological experiments. His novel Kenguru (Kangaroo) tells the story of an old thief and his ordeals during the Stalinist era trials; Josef Stalin himself is a character. Another essential element of Aleshkovsky's style is fantasy and the grotesque. His novel Ruka (The Hand) defines Soviet communist doctrine as a modern representation of absolute evil.

Kniga poslednikh slov (The book of last words) deals with an essential theme of Russian literature, "the problem of the little man" - the difficulty of the social existence of a simple but honest man. The theme was begun by Nikolai Gogol, and further enhanced and dramatized by Fyodor Dostoevsky, among others.

Aleshkovsky was one of the first to use expletives in his writing. His best-known and most appreciated works are his anti-Stalinist songs, which have become part of an urban folk tradition in the Soviet Union and are even mistakenly considered by some to be anonymous.

== Works ==
=== Novels ===
- Nikolai Nikolaevich (written 1970, published 1980)
- Kenguru - Kangaroo (written 1974-75, published 1981)
- Ruka - The hand (written 1978-80, published 1980)
- Maskirovka - Camouflage (1978)
- Karusel - Caroussel (1979)
- Sinen'kij skromnyj platochek - Modest blue kerchief (1981)
- Smert' v Moskve Death in Moscow (1983)
- Ruru - Ruru (1985)
- Bloshinoe tango - Flea Tango (1987)
- Persten' v futliare - Ring in a case (1991)
- Predposlednyaya zhizn - The penultimate life (2009)
- Malen'kiy Tyuremnyi Roman - A Little Prison Novel (2011)

=== Short stories ===
- Kniga poslednikh slov - 35 prestuplenii - The book of last words - 35 crimes (collection, Vermont 1984)

=== Screenplays ===
- Chto s toboy proisxodit (1975) - What's Happening to You?
- Kysh i dva portfelya (1974) - Kysh and Two Schoolbags
- Proisshestviye (1974) - An Accident
- Vot moya derevnya (1972) - Here is My Village

=== Children's novellas ===
- Kysh, dva portfelya i tselaya nedelya - Kysh, two schoolbags and the whole week
- Kysh i ya v Krymu - Kysh and I in the Crimea (1975)

=== Other ===
- Антология Сатиры и Юмора России XX века (Том 8) - Anthology of Russian Satire & Humour (Vol. 8)
- Sobranie sochinenii - Collected works (3 volumes to date)

=== English translations ===
- Nikolai Nikolaevich and Camouflage: Two Novels, Columbia University Press, 2019 (The Russian Library). Translated by Duffield White. Edited by Susanne Fusso.
