= Sergei Lavrentyev =

Russian footballer and coach

Personal information
- Full name: Sergei Nikolayevich Lavrentyev
- Date of birth: 9 April 1972 (age 54)
- Place of birth: Klimovsk, Russian SFSR
- Height: 1.68 m (5 ft 6 in)
- Position: Forward

Senior career*
Years	Team	Apps	(Gls)
1989	FC Dynamo-2 Moscow	1	(0)
1992–1994	FC Tekhinvest-M Moskovsky	110	(38)
1995	FC Arsenal Tula	35	(5)
1996	FC MChS-Selyatino Selyatino	38	(29)
1997–1998	FC Torpedo-ZIL Moscow	74	(21)

Managerial career
- 2008: FC Nara-ShBFR Naro-Fominsk (administrator)
- 2009–2010: FC Nara-ShBFR Naro-Fominsk
- 2011–2012: CSP Izmailovo
- 2012–2015: Russia Women
- * Club domestic league appearances and goals

Sergei Nikolayevich Lavrentyev (Russian: Серге́й Николаевич Лаврентьев; born 9 April 1972) is a Russian professional football coach and a former player.

== Playing career ==
As a player, he made his debut in the Soviet Second League in 1989 for FC Dynamo-2 Moscow.

He played five games for German club FC Einheit 1990 Wernigerode in the 1992–93 NOFV-Oberliga Mitte.

== Coaching career ==
Lavrentyev coached CSP Izmailovo of the Russian Women's Football Championship from February 2011 until October 2012, when he took the job as Russia women's national football team coach.
