= Zvezda-2005 Perm =

Russian women's association football club

- Full name: Zvezda-2005 Perm
- Founded: 2005; 20 years ago
- Ground: Zvezda Stadium, Perm, Russia
- Chairman: Gennadiy Shilov
- Manager: Elena Suslova
- League: Russian women's football championship
- 2025: 11th
- Website: http://www.zvezda2005.ru
Home colours	Away colours

Zvezda-2005 Perm (Russian: "Звезда-2005" Пермь) is a Russian professional women's football club currently competing in the Russian Women's Football Championship.

== History ==
The club is based in the city of Perm and takes its name from men's team Zvezda Perm, which was dissolved in 1997. Zvezda-2005 won both the Russian league and national cup in 2007, and subsequently reached the final of the 2008-09 UEFA Women's Cup, losing to Duisburg.

They also won the Russian league in 2008 and 2009, making it three titles in a row. In 2010 they were third, failing to qualify to the Champions League.

== Honours ==
- Top Division
  - Winners (6): 2007, 2008, 2009, 2014, 2015, 2017
- Russian Women's Cup
  - Winners (7): 2007, 2012, 2013, 2015, 2016, 2018, 2019

== European history ==
- All results (home and away) list Zvezda's goal tally first.

Season	Competition	Stage	Result	Opponent
2008–09	UEFA Women's Cup	Qualifying Stage	8–0	(Lithuania) Gintra Universitetas
2008–09	UEFA Women's Cup	Qualifying Stage	8–0	(Faroe Islands) KÍ
2008–09	UEFA Women's Cup	Qualifying Stage	1–0	(Hungary) Femina Budapest
2008–09	UEFA Women's Cup	Group Stage	1–0	(Germany) Frankfurt
2008–09	UEFA Women's Cup	Group Stage	1–0	(Scotland) Glasgow City
2008–09	UEFA Women's Cup	Group Stage	3–1	(Norway) Røa
2008–09	UEFA Women's Cup	Quarter-Finals	4–2, 3–1	(Denmark) Brøndby
2008–09	UEFA Women's Cup	Semi-Finals	2–0, 2–2	(Sweden) Umeå
2008–09	UEFA Women's Cup	Final	0–6, 1–1	(Germany) Duisburg
2009–10	UEFA Champions League	Round of 32	3–0, 5–0	(Bosnia and Herzegovina) Sarajevo
2009–10	UEFA Champions League	Round of 16	0–0, 1–1	(Norway) Røa
2010–11	UEFA Champions League	Round of 32	2–1, 2–1	(Cyprus) Apollon Limassol
2010–11	UEFA Champions League	Round of 16	1–1, 4–0	(Norway) Røa
2010–11	UEFA Champions League	Quarter-Finals	0–0, 0–1	(France) Olympique Lyon
2014–15	UEFA Champions League	Round of 32	5–2, 3–1	(Iceland) Stjarnan
2014–15	UEFA Champions League	Round of 16	0–5, 3–0	(Sweden) Linköpings
2015–16	UEFA Champions League	Round of 32	3–1, 3–1	(Iceland) Stjarnan
2015–16	UEFA Champions League	Round of 16	1–2, 0–0	(Czech Republic) Slavia Praha
2016–17	UEFA Champions League	Round of 32	0–2, 0–4	(England) Manchester City
2017–18	UEFA Champions League	Round of 32	1–0, 0–2	(France) Montpellier
2018–19	UEFA Champions League	Round of 32	0–3, 0–1	(Norway) LSK Kvinner

== Squad ==
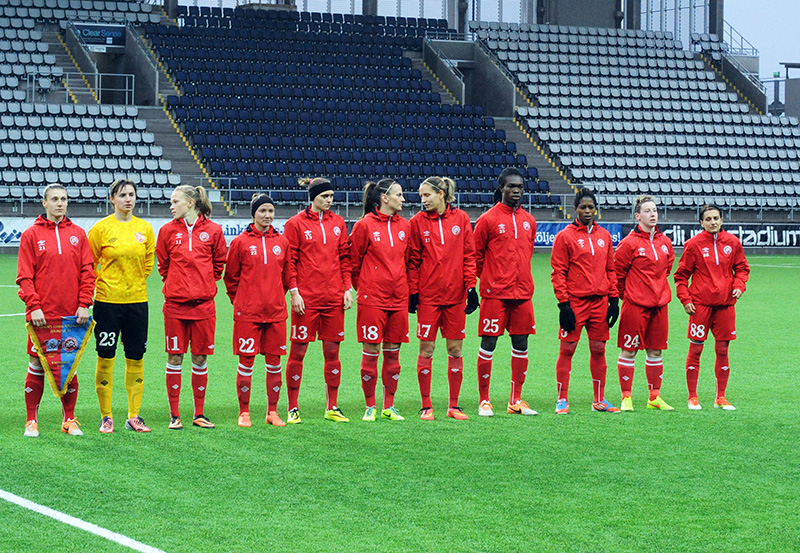
Lining up for a UEFA Women's Champions League match at Linköpings in 2014

As of 1 June 2025

Note: Flags indicate national team as defined under FIFA eligibility rules; some limited exceptions apply. Players may hold more than one non-FIFA nationality.

No.	Pos.	Nation	Player
4	DF	RUS	Zhoze-Diana Pamen Tchato
5	MF	BLR	Anna Bysik
6	DF	RUS	Olga Posokhina
7	FW	RUS	Olesya Kurochkina
8	DF	MDA	Anastasia Sivolobova
9	MF	BLR	Kristina Tikhovodova
12	GK	RUS	Alisa Matskevich
14	FW	RUS	Darya Sorokina
15	MF	RUS	Kristina Rogozhkina
16	MF	RUS	Ksenia Shakhova
17	DF	UZB	Dilrabo Asadova
19	MF	BLR	Yana Ray

No.	Pos.	Nation	Player
22	MF	RUS	Alena Nurgalieva
23	GK	UKR	Iryna Zvarych
27	MF	RUS	Polina Rogozhkina
31	MF	BLR	Anastasia Mager
33	DF	RUS	Arina Faskhutdinova
47	MF	RUS	Anastasia Pervushina
55	MF	RUS	Ksenia Kuzishchina
66	DF	RUS	Yelizaveta Pirogova
81	GK	RUS	Margarita Shirokova
90	DF	RUS	Anastasiya Akimova
91	DF	RUS	Sofia Artsimovich
97	FW	BLR	Elizaveta Sergeychik

=== Former internationals ===
- Armenia: Kristine Aleksanyan
- Azerbaijan: Olga Vasilyeva
- Cameroon: Claudine Meffometou
- Ivory Coast: Josée Nahi
- Kazakhstan: Irina Saratovtseva
- Netherlands: Petra Hogewoning
- Nigeria: Ifeanyi Chiejine
- Russia: Natalia Barbashina, Maria Dyatchkova, Olesya Kurochkina, Tatyana Skotnikova, Valentina Savchenkova, Elena Suslova, Ksenia Tsybutovich
- South Africa: Busisiwe Ndimeni, Lena Mosebo
- Ukraine: Olha Boychenko, Vera Djatel, Hanna Kostraba, Olena Khodyreva, Alla Lyshafay, Ludmila Pekur, Natalia Zinchenko

== Staff ==
- Head Coach: (Russia) Elena Suslova
- Youth Coach: (Azerbaijan) Olga Vasilyeva
- Goalkeeper Coach: (Russia) Maksim Chadov

== See also ==
- FC Zvezda Perm
