= SKA Rostov-on-Don (women) =

SKA Rostov-on-Don СКА-Ростов-на-Дону
- Full name: SKA (Army Sports Club) Rostov-on-Don
- Founded: 2006; 19 years ago
- Dissolved: 2008; 17 years ago
- Ground: SKA SKVO Stadium, Rostov-on-Don
- Capacity: 27,300
- Chairman: Ivan Savvidis
- Manager: Gocha Mikadze
- 2008: Russian Women's Football Championship, 3rd
Home colours

SKA Rostov-on-Don (Russian: СКА-Ростов-на-Дону) was a Russian women's association football club based in Rostov-on-Don. Founded in 2006 as part of the male football club FC SKVO Rostov-on-Don, they folded in 2008 after finishing third in the Russian Women's Football Championship. Owner Ivan Savvidis could no longer fund the team due to the global economic downturn.
