= CSP Izmailovo =

CSP Izmailovo ЦСП Измайлово
- Full name: CSP (Centre for Sports Training) Izmailovo
- Founded: 2006; 19 years ago
- Dissolved: 2014; 11 years ago
- Ground: Sportivnyj gorodok Luzhniki, Moscow
- Capacity: 2,640
- Manager: Svetlana Petko
- 2013: Russian Women's Football Championship, 6th
- Website: http://www.shvsmizmailovo.ru/
Home colours

CSP Izmailovo (Russian: ЦСП Измайлово), formerly ShVSM Izmailovo, was a women's association football club based in Moscow, Russia. Founded in 2006, they began play in 2007 but folded in June 2014 during the Russian Women's Football Championship season.

The team was coached by Sergey Lavrentyev from February 2011 until October 2012, when he took the job as Russia women's national football team coach.

== See also ==
- SKIF-CSP Izmailovo (women's water polo team)
