= Russian women's football clubs in international competitions =

This is a compilation of the results of teams representing Russia at the official international competitions for European women's football clubs, that is, the former UEFA Women's Cup and its successor the UEFA Women's Champions League. Russia is one of two associations that have reached the final of the competition but haven't won it, the other being Denmark.

As of the 2019-20 edition Russia is ranked 10th in the UWCL association rankings with a coefficient of 31,500. Therefore, both the champion and the runner-up of the Russian Championship qualify for the competition.

== Teams ==
These are the nine teams that have represented Russia in the UEFA Women's Cup and the UEFA Women's Champions League.

Club	Founded	Federal subject	City	Appearances	First	Last	Best result
Chertanovo	1987	Moscow	Moscow	1	2019–20	2019–20	Round of 32
CSK VVS Samara	1988	Samara Oblast	Samara	1	2003–04	2003–04	Quarterfinal
CSKA Moscow	2016	Moscow	Moscow	1	2020–21	2020–21	Qualifiers
Energiya Voronezh	1989	Voronezh Oblast	Voronezh	3	2003–04	2011–12	Quarterfinal
Lada Togliatti	1987	Samara Oblast	Togliatti	1	2005–06	2005–06	Round of 16
Rossiyanka	2003	Moscow Oblast	Khimki	9	2006–07	2017–18	Quarterfinal
Ryazan-VDV	1996	Ryazan Oblast	Ryazan	4	2001–02	2019–20	Quarterfinal
Zorky Krasnogorsk	2006	Moscow Oblast	Krasnogorsk	3	2012–13	2015–16	Round of 16
Zvezda-2005 Perm	2005	Perm Krai	Perm	8	2008–09	2018–19	Final

Locations of the teams within Russia

== Qualification ==
Edition	Competition	First	Second	Third	Fourth
2001–02 UWC	2000 Championship	Ryazan-TNK (43)	Energiya Voronezh (40)	CSK VVS Samara (32)	Kubanochka (28)
2002–03 UWC	2001 Championship	CSK VVS Samara (61)	Energiya Voronezh (50)	Ryazan-TNK (46)	Lada Togliatti (38)
2003–04 UWC	2002 Championship	Energiya Voronezh (46)	Lada Togliatti (45)	Ryazan-TNK (42)	CSK VVS Samara (39)
2004–05 UWC	2003 Championship	Energiya Voronezh (33)	Lada Togliatti (31)	CSK VVS Samara (26)	Ryazan-VDV (25)
2005–06 UWC	2004 Championship	Lada Togliatti (35)	Rossiyanka (32)	Energiya Voronezh (31)	Nadezhda Noginsk (22)
2006–07 UWC	2005 Championship	Rossiyanka (48)	Lada Togliatti (42)	Nadezhda Noginsk (33)	Ryazan-VDV (29)
2007–08 UWC	2006 Championship	Rossiyanka (44)	Spartak Moscow (37)	Nadezhda Noginsk (34)	Ryazan-VDV (32)
2008–09 UWC	2007 Championship	Zvezda-2005 Perm (46)	Rossiyanka (42)	Nadezhda Noginsk (29)	Khimki (27)
2009–10 UWCL	2008 Championship	Zvezda-2005 Perm (48)	Rossiyanka (39)	SKA Rostov-on-Don (25)	Ryazan-VDV (18)
2010–11 UWCL	2009 Championship	Zvezda-2005 Perm (33)	Rossiyanka (27)	Energiya Voronezh (21)	Izmailovo (17)
2011–12 UWCL	2010 Championship	Rossiyanka (69)	Energiya Voronezh (47)	Zvezda-2005 Perm (46)	Izmailovo (41)
2012–13 UWCL	2011–12 Championship	Rossiyanka (72)	Zorky Krasnogorsk (55)	Energiya Voronezh (54)	Zvezda-2005 Perm (49)
2013–14 UWCL	2012–13 Championship	Zorky Krasnogorsk (45)	Rossiyanka (40)	Ryazan-VDV (36)	Zvezda-2005 Perm (25)
2014–15 UWCL	2013 Championship	Ryazan-VDV (35)	Zvezda-2005 Perm (29)	Zorky Krasnogorsk (28)	Rossiyanka (26)
2015–16 UWCL	2014 Championship	Zvezda-2005 Perm (37)	Zorky Krasnogorsk (33)	Ryazan-VDV (27)	Rossiyanka (16)
2016–17 UWCL	2015 Championship	Zvezda-2005 Perm (40)	Rossiyanka (38)	Zorky Krasnogorsk (29)	Ryazan-VDV (29)
2017–18 UWCL	2016 Championship	Rossiyanka (35)	Zvezda-2005 Perm (26)	Ryazan-VDV (25)	Chertanovo Moscow (21)
2018–19 UWCL	2017 Championship	Zvezda-2005 Perm (35)	Ryazan-VDV (31)	Chertanovo Moscow (29)	CSKA Moscow (28)
2019–20 UWCL	2018 Championship	Ryazan-VDV (33)	Chertanovo Moscow (26)	Zvezda-2005 Perm (25)	CSKA Moscow (25)
2020–21 UWCL	2019 Championship	CSKA Moscow (56)	Lokomotiv Moscow (44)	Kubanochka Krasnodar (35)	Zvezda-2005 Perm (31)
2021–22 UWCL	2020 Championship	CSKA Moscow (33)	Lokomotiv Moscow (32)	Zvezda-2005 Perm (21)	Ryazan-VDV (19)

== Historical progression ==
	2001–02	2002–03	2003–04	2004–05	2005–06	2006–07	2007–08	2008–09	2009–10	2010–11
Champion										
Finalist								ZVE		
Semifinalists								ZVE		
Quarterfinalists	RYA	CSK	ENE	ENE			ROS	ZVE		ZVE
Last 16	Not played	Not played	Not played	ENE	LAD	ROS	ROS	ZVE	ROS – ZVE	ZVE – ROS
Last 32	RYA	CSK	ENE	ENE	LAD	ROS	ROS	ZVE	ROS – ZVE	ZVE – ROS
Earlier stages									ROS	ROS
	2011–12	2012–13	2013–14	2014–15	2015–16	2016–17	2017–18	2018–19	2019–20	2020–21
Champion										
Finalist										
Semifinalists										
Quarterfinalists	ROS	ROS								
Last 16	ROS – ENE	ROS – ZOR	ROS – ZOR	ZVE	ZVE	ROS				
Last 32	ROS – ENE	ROS – ZOR	ROS – ZOR	ZVE – RYA	ZVE – ZOR	ROS – ZVE	ROS – ZVE	ZVE – RYA	RYA – CHE	
Earlier stages										CSK
	2021–22									
Champion										
Finalist										
Semifinalists										
Quarterfinalists										
Group stage										
Qualifying Round 2										
Qualifying Round 1	CSK – LOK									

== Results by team ==
=== Chertanovo ===
2019–20 UEFA Women's Champions League
Round	Opponent	1st	2nd	Agg.	Scorers
Last 32	(Scotland) Glasgow City	h: 0–1	a: 1–4	1–5	Komissarova

=== CSK VVS Samara ===
2002–03 UEFA Women's Cup
Round	Opponent	1st	2nd	Agg.	Scorers
Last 32 (group stage)	(Scotland) Kilmarnock	0–0		1 point	
Last 32 (group stage)	(Austria) Innsbruck (host)	4–0		4 points	Dyarbolova – Dyatchkova – Egorova – Kremleva
Last 32 (group stage)	(Portugal) 1º Dezembro	3–0		7 points	Kremleva 2 – Grigorieva
Quarterfinals	(England) Arsenal	h: 0–2	a: 1–1	1–3	Kremleva

=== CSKA Moscow ===
2020–21 UEFA Women's Champions League
Round	Opponent	1st	2nd	Agg.	Scorers
Qualifiers (first round)	(Estonia) Flora	h: 2–0		2–0	Smirnova – Bespalikova
Qualifiers (second round)	(Austria) St. Pölten	a: 0–1		0–1	

=== Energiya Voronezh ===
2003–04 UEFA Women's Cup
Round	Opponent	1st	2nd	Agg.	Scorers
Last 32 (group stage)	(Hungary) Femina Budapest	11–0		3 points	Morozova 3 – Zinchenko 3 – Skotnikova 2 – Strukova 2 – Terekhova
Last 32 (group stage)	(Italy) Foroni Verona	0–0		4 points	
Last 32 (group stage)	(Croatia) Osijek	13–0		7 points	Zinchenko 5 – Danilova 3 – Degai – Morozova – Saenko – Shmachkova – Stepanenko
Quarterfinals	(Sweden) Umeå	h: 1–2	a: 1–2	2–4	Danilova – Sitnikova

2004–05 UEFA Women's Cup
Round	Opponent	1st	2nd	Agg.	Scorers
Last 32 (group stage)	(North Macedonia) Skiponjat	13–0		3 points	Gorbacheva 4 – Benson 3 – Zvarych 3 – Apanaschenko – Bukashkina – Kozhnikova
Last 32 (group stage)	(Lithuania) Gintra Universitetas (host)	11–0		6 points	Zinchenko 4 – Apanaschenko 2 – Terekhova 2 – Benson – Gorbacheva – Lamtyugina
Last 32 (group stage)	(Azerbaijan) Gömrükçü Baku	3–0		9 points	Terekhova 2 – Apanaschenko
Last 16 (group stage)	(Denmark) Brøndby (host)	1–1		1 point	Zinchenko
Last 16 (group stage)	(Norway) Trondheims-Ørn	1–1		2 points	Bosikova
Last 16 (group stage)	(Kazakhstan) Alma	4–1		5 points	Rastetter 3
Quarterfinals	(Germany) Turbine Potsdam	h: 1–1	a: 1–4	2–5	Bosikova – Rastetter

2011–12 UEFA Women's Champions League
Round	Opponent	1st	2nd	Agg.	Scorers
Last 32	(England) Bristol Academy	a: 1–1	h: 4–2	5–3	Conti 2 – Mashina 2 – Boquete
Last 16	(Russia) Rossiyanka	h: 0–4	a: 3–3	3–7	Danilova – Ogbiagbevha – Terekhova

=== Lada Togliatti ===
2005–06 UEFA Women's Cup
Round	Opponent	1st	2nd	Agg.	Scorers
Last 32 (group stage)	(Bosnia and Herzegovina) Sarajevo (host)	3–0		3 points	Kremleva – Russkikh – Savina
Last 32 (group stage)	(Slovakia) PVFA	6–0		6 points	Kremleva 2 – Savina 2 – Ryzhevich – Savchenkova
Last 32 (group stage)	(Slovenia) Krka	5–0		9 points	Kostraba 3 – Savina – Zangieva
Last 16 (group stage)	(Denmark) Brøndby (host)	0–2		0 points	
Last 16 (group stage)	(England) Arsenal	0–1		0 points	
Last 16 (group stage)	(Poland) AZS Wroclaw	3–3		1 point	Kremleva – Ryzhevich – Savina

=== Rossiyanka ===
2006–07 UEFA Women's Cup
Round	Opponent	1st	2nd	Agg.	Scorers
Last 32 (group stage)	(Kazakhstan) Alma	5–2		3 points	Egorova – Kremleva – Letyushova – Shlyapina – Verezubova
Last 32 (group stage)	(Romania) Clujana	7–0		6 points	Kremleva 3 – Letyushova 2 – Egorova – Skotnikova
Last 32 (group stage)	(Slovakia) Slovan Duslo Šaľa (host)	6–1		9 points	Barbashina – Letyushova – Shlyapina – Shmachkova – Skotnikova – Tsydikova
Last 16 (group stage)	(England) Arsenal	4–5		0 points	Barbashina – Letyushova – Morozova – Verezubova
Last 16 (group stage)	(Denmark) Brøndby	1–2		0 points	Verezubova
Last 16 (group stage)	(Hungary) Femina Budapest (host)	4–2		3 points	Shlyapina – Morozova – Sergaeva – Tsybutovich

2007–08 UEFA Women's Cup
Round	Opponent	1st	2nd	Agg.	Scorers
Last 32 (group stage)	(Serbia) Napredak Kruševac	7–0		3 points	Barbashina 2 – Shlyapina 2 – Kremleva – Pekur – Skotnikova
Last 32 (group stage)	(Georgia (country)) Dinamo Tbilisi	18–0		6 points	Pekur 5 – Shlyapina 4 – Kremleva 3 – Barbashina 2 – Kozhnikova – Morozova – Petrova – Tsybutovich
Last 32 (group stage)	(Ukraine) Arsenal Kharkiv	3–0		9 points	Barbashina – Kozhnikova – Shlyapina
Last 16 (group stage)	(Belarus) Universitet Vitebsk	3–1		3 points	Morozova – Petrova – Tsybutovich
Last 16 (group stage)	(Romania) Clujana	2–1		6 points	Petrova – Shlyapina
Last 16 (group stage)	(Sweden) Umeå (host)	2–2		7 points	Barbashina 2
Quarterfinals	(Germany) Frankfurt	h: 0–0	a: 1–2	1–2	Morozova

2009–10 UEFA Women's Champions League
Round	Opponent	1st	2nd	Agg.	Scorers
Qualifiers (group stage)	(Republic of Ireland) St Francis	11–0		3 points	Danilova 4 – Ogbiagbevha 3 – Morozova – Pekur – Petrova – Skotnikova
Qualifiers (group stage)	(Cyprus) Apollon Limassol (host)	1–0		6 points	Ogbiagbevha
Qualifiers (group stage)	(Israel) Maccabi Holon	7–0		9 points	Danilova 2 – Kharchenko – Ogbiagbevha – Petrova – Shlyapina – Terekhova
Last 32	(Spain) Rayo Vallecano	a: 3–1	h: 2–1	5–2	Ogbiagbevha 2 – Danilova – Petrova – Shmachkova
Last 16	(Sweden) Umeå	h: 0–1	a: 1–1	1–2	Kozhnikova

2010–11 UEFA Women's Champions League
Round	Opponent	1st	2nd	Agg.	Scorers
Qualifiers (group stage)	(Croatia) Osijek (host)	5–0		3 points	Kharchenko – Morozova – Ogbiagbevha – Shlyapina – Shmachkova
Qualifiers (group stage)	(Republic of Ireland) St Francis	9–0		6 points	Ogbiagbevha – Shlyapina 2 – Chorna – Morozova – Nyandeni
Qualifiers (group stage)	(Portugal) 1º Dezembreo	4–1		9 points	Kharchenko – Nyandeni – Skotnikova – Slonova
Last 32	(Ukraine) Lehenda Chernihiv	a: 3–1	h: 4–0	7–1	Nyandeni 2 – Petrova 2 – Shlyapina – Skotnikova – Slonova
Last 16	(France) Olympique Lyonnais	a: 1–6	h: 0–5	1–11	Ogbiagbevha

2011–12 UEFA Women's Champions League
Round	Opponent	1st	2nd	Agg.	Scorers
Last 32	(Netherlands) Twente	a: 2–0	h: 1–0	3–0	Cristiane 2 – Jakobsson
Last 16	(Russia) Energiya Voronezh	a: 4–0	h: 3–3	7–3	Jakobsson 3 – Chorna – Cristiane – Morozova
Quarterfinals	(Germany) Turbine Potsdam	a: 0–2	h: 0–3	0–5	

2012–13 UEFA Women's Champions League
Round	Opponent	1st	2nd	Agg.	Scorers
Last 32	(Netherlands) ADO Den Haag	a: 4–1	h: 1–2	5–3	Shlyapina 3 – Skotnikova 2
Last 16	(Czech Republic) Sparta Prague	a: 1–0	h: 2–2	3–2	Fabiana – Oparanozie
Quarterfinals	(Germany) Wolfsburg	a: 1–2	h: 0–2	1–4	

2013–14 UEFA Women's Champions League
Round	Opponent	1st	2nd	Agg.	Scorers
Last 32	(Serbia) Spartak Subotica	a: 4–2	h: 1–1	5–3	Shlyapina 3 – Nyandeni – Yakovyshyn
Last 16	(Italy) Torres	h: 1–0	a: 0–2	1–2	

2016–17 UEFA Women's Champions League
Round	Opponent	1st	2nd	Agg.	Scorers
Last 32	(Bosnia and Herzegovina) Sarajevo	a: 0–0	h: 2–1	2–1	Nahi – Nrehy
Last 16	(Germany) Bayern Munich	a: 0–4	h: 0–4	0–8	

2017–18 UEFA Women's Champions League
Round	Opponent	1st	2nd	Agg.	Scorers
Last 32	(Iceland) Stjarnan	a: 1–1	h: 0–4	1–5	Shadrina

=== Ryazan-VDV ===
2001–02 UEFA Women's Cup
Round	Opponent	1st	2nd	Agg.	Scorers
Last 32 (group stage)	(Netherlands) Ter Leede (host)	4–0		3 points	Letyushova 2 – Barbashina – Pustovoitova
Last 32 (group stage)	(Greece) Kavala	11–0		6 points	Barbashina 4 – Zinchenko 3 – Letyushova 2 – Verezubova – Yushchenko
Last 32 (group stage)	(Slovakia) Žilina	13–0		9 points	Letyushova 4 – Pustovoitova 3 – Kolomiets – Verezubova – Yaraikina
Quarterfinals	(Sweden) Umeå	a: 1–4	h: 1–3	2–7	Pustovoitova – Verezubova

2014–15 UEFA Women's Champions League
Round	Opponent	1st	2nd	Agg.	Scorers
Last 32	(Sweden) Rosengård	h: 1–3	a: 0–2	1–5	Tsybutovich

2018–19 UEFA Women's Champions League
Round	Opponent	1st	2nd	Agg.	Scorers
Last 32	(Sweden) Rosengård	h: 0–1	a: 0–2	0–3	

2019–20 UEFA Women's Champions League
Round	Opponent	1st	2nd	Agg.	Scorers
Last 32	(France) Lyon	h: 0–9	a: 0–7	0–16	

=== Zorky Krasnogorsk ===
2012–13 UEFA Women's Champions League
Round	Opponent	1st	2nd	Agg.	Scorers
Last 32	(Iceland) Stjarnan	a: 0–0	h: 3–1	3–1	Dyatel 2 – Ruiz
Last 16	(France) Olympique Lyonnais	h: 0–9	a: 0–2	0–11	

2013–14 UEFA Women's Champions League
Round	Opponent	1st	2nd	Agg.	Scorers
Last 32	(Iceland) Þór/KA	a: 2–1	h: 4–1	6–2	Morozova 2 – Dyatel – Mautz – Nick – Tsydikova
Last 16	(England) Birmingham City	h: 0–2	a: 2–5	2–7	Nick – Ruiz

2015–16 UEFA Women's Champions League
Round	Opponent	1st	2nd	Agg.	Scorers
Last 32	(Spain) Atlético Madrid	a: 2–0	h: 0–3	2–3	Slonova 2

=== Zvezda-2005 Perm ===
2008–09 UEFA Women's Cup
Round	Opponent	1st	2nd	Agg.	Scorers
Last 32 (group stage)	(Lithuania) Gintra Universitetas (host)	8–0		3 points	Kurochkina 5 – Barbashina – Dyatel – Savchenkova
Last 32 (group stage)	(Faroe Islands) KÍ	8–0		6 points	Kurochkina 2 – Zinchenko 2 – Barbashina – Korovushkina – Lishafai
Last 32 (group stage)	(Hungary) Femina Budapest	1–0		9 points	Zinchenko
Last 16 (group stage)	(Germany) Frankfurt	1–0		3 points	Kostraba
Last 16 (group stage)	(Scotland) Glasgow City	1–0		6 points	Kostraba
Last 16 (group stage)	(Norway) Røa (host)	3–1		9 points	Barbashina 2 – Dyatel
Quarterfinals	(Denmark) Brøndby	a: 4–2	h: 3–1	7–3	Barbashina 3 – Dyatel 2 – Savchenkova – Zinchenko
Semifinals	(Sweden) Umeå	h: 2–0	a: 2–2	4–2	Apanaschenko 2 – Dyatel – Zinchenko
Final	(Germany) Duisburg	h: 0–6	a: 1–1	1–7	Apanaschenko

2009–10 UEFA Women's Champions League
Round	Opponent	1st	2nd	Agg.	Scorers
Last 32	(Bosnia and Herzegovina) Sarajevo	a: 3–0	h: 5–0	8–0	Apanaschenko 2 – Zinchenko 2 – Barbashina – Dyatel – Korovushkina – Tsybutovich
Last 16	(Norway) Røa	a: 0–0	h: 1–1	1–1 (agr)	Barbashina

2010–11 UEFA Women's Champions League
Round	Opponent	1st	2nd	Agg.	Scorers
Last 32	(Cyprus) Apollon Limassol	a: 2–1	h: 2–1	4–2	Dyatel – Kurochkina – Leyva – Ruiz
Last 16	(Norway) Røa	a: 1–1	h: 4–0	5–1	Apanaschenko – Dyatel – Dyatchkova – Khodyreva – Ruiz
Quarterfinals	(France) Olympique Lyonnais	h: 0–0	h: 0–1	0–1	

2014–15 UEFA Women's Champions League
Round	Opponent	1st	2nd	Agg.	Scorers
Last 32	(Iceland) Stjarnan	a: 5–2	h: 3–1	8–3	Nahi 4 – Apanaschenko 2 – Kipyatkova – Pozdeeva
Last 16	(Sweden) Linköping	a: 0–5	h: 3–0	3–5	Andrushchak – Nahi – Pantyukhina

2015–16 UEFA Women's Champions League
Round	Opponent	1st	2nd	Agg.	Scorers
Last 32	(Iceland) Stjarnan	a: 3–1	h: 3–1	6–2	Apanaschenko 3 – Kurochkina 2 – Boychenko
Last 16	(Czech Republic) Slavia Prague	h: 0–0	a: 1–2	1–2	Nahi

2016–17 UEFA Women's Champions League
Round	Opponent	1st	2nd	Agg.	Scorers
Last 32	(England) Manchester City	a: 0–2	h: 0–4	0–6	

2017–18 UEFA Women's Champions League
Round	Opponent	1st	2nd	Agg.	Scorers
Last 32	(France) Montpellier	a: 1–0	h: 0–2	1–2	

2018–19 UEFA Women's Champions League
Round	Opponent	1st	2nd	Agg.	Scorers
Last 32	(Norway) LSK Kvinner	a: 0–3	h: 0–1	0–4	
