= WFC Rossiyanka in European football =

This article is a compilation of FK Rossiyanka results at UEFA international women's football competitions. As of the beginning of 2017 the team held a 27 - 7 - 14 record with a goal average of 141 - 56 in the UEFA Women's Cup and the UEFA Women's Champions League, and it had reached the competition's quarter-finals in three occasions.

== 2006-07 UEFA Women's Cup ==
=== Preliminary stage ===
8 August 2006

FK Rossiyanka (Russia)	5 – 2	(Kazakhstan) Alma-KTZh
Egorova 7'; Mokshanova 17'; Letyushova 57'; Verezubova 60'; Kremleva 74'		Li 66'; Kostova 69'

Mocenok
10 August 2006

FK Rossiyanka (Russia)	7 – 0	(Romania) CFF Clujana
Skotnikova 18'; Letyushova 40', 44' (pen.); Egorova 48'; Kremleva 75', 76', 84' (pen.)

Mocenok
13 August 2006

Slovan Duslo Sal'a (Slovakia)	1 – 6	(Russia) FK Rossiyanka
Javarová 75'		Barbashina 1'; Tsydikova 26'; Mokshanova 36'; Shmachkova 60'; Skotnikova 77'; Letyushova 90' (pen.)

Šaľa

=== First stage ===
12 September 2006

FK Rossiyanka (Russia)	4 – 5	(England) Arsenal FC
Morozova 4'; Barbashina 51'; Verezubova 68'; Letyushova 85'		Fleeting 1', 21', 42', 49', 64'

Krasnoarmeysk
14 September 2006

FK Rossiyanka (Russia)	1 – 2	(Denmark) Brøndby IF
Verezubova 15'		Eggers Nielsen 40'; K. Nielsen 43'

Krasnoarmeysk
17 September 2006

FK Rossiyanka (Russia)	4 – 2	(Hungary) Femina Budapest
Tsybutovich 8'; Morozova 19'; Mokshanova 22'; Sergaeva 26'		Nagy 38', 42'

Krasnoarmeysk

== 2007-08 UEFA Women's Cup ==
=== Preliminary stage ===
9 August 2007

FK Rossiyanka (Russia)	7 – 0	(Serbia) Napredak Krusevac
Mokshanova 38', 75'; Skotnikova 42'; Pekur 46'; Kremleva 47'; Barbashina 70', ?'

Krasnoarmeysk
11 August 2007

FK Rossiyanka (Russia)	18 – 0	(Georgia (country)) Dinamo Tbilisi
Pekur 5', 36', 38', 52', 61'; Barbashina 13', 42'; Mokshanova 25', 33', 34', 82' (pen.); Tsybutovich 45'; Petrova 48'; Kremleva 58', 59', 68'; Morozova 71'; Kozhnikova 79'

Krasnoarmeysk
14 August 2007

FK Rossiyanka (Russia)	3 – 0	(Ukraine) Metalist Kharkiv
Kozhnikova 35'; Barbashina 50'; Mokshanova 71'

Krasnoarmeysk

=== First stage ===
11 October 2007

FK Rossiyanka (Russia)	3 – 1	(Belarus) Universitet Vitebsk
Petrova 9'; Tsybutovich 36'; Morozova 87'		Malinovskaya 46'

Umeå
14 October 2007

FK Rossiyanka (Russia)	2 – 1	(Romania) CFF Clujana
Mokshanova 30'; Petrova 78'		Ilinca 73'

Umeå
14 October 2007

Umeå IK (Sweden)	2 – 2	(Russia) FK Rossiyanka
Marta 26' (pen.), 40'		Barbashina 53', 56'

Umeå

=== Quarter-finals ===
15 November 2007
16:00 (CET)

FK Rossiyanka (Russia)	0 – 0	(Germany) Frankfurt

Rodina, Moscow
Attendance: 800
Referee: (Romania) Cristina Dorcioman
21 November 2007
13:30 (CET)

Frankfurt (Germany)	2 – 1	(Russia) FK Rossiyanka
Wimbersky 23'; Prinz 44'		Morozova 91'

Stadion am Brentanobad, Frankfurt
Attendance: 2,165
Referee: (England) Wendy Toms

== 2009-10 UEFA Women's Champions League ==
=== Preliminary stage ===
30 July 2009
13:30 (EET)

FK Rossiyanka (Russia)	11 – 0	(Republic of Ireland) St Francis FC
Morozova 8'; Skotnikova 11'; Petrova 20'; Ogbiagbevha 23', 30', 31'; Pekur 35'; Danilova 66', 70', 77', 84'

Stadion Tsirion, Limassol
Referee: (Malta) Esther Azzopardi
1 August 2009
18:00 (EET)

Apollon Limassol (Cyprus)	0 – 1	(Russia) FK Rossiyanka
		Ogbiagbevha 14'

Stadion Tsirion, Limassol
Referee: (Sweden) Paula Thörn
4 August 2009
17:45 (EET)

FK Rossiyanka (Russia)	7 – 0	(Israel) Maccabi Holon
Danilova 20', 67'; Petrova 36'; Kharchenko 42'; Terekhova 53'; Ogbiagbevha 75'; Mokshanova 90+1'

Stadion Pafiako, Pafos
Referee: (Spain) Paloma Quintero

=== Round of 32 ===
30 September 2009
17:00 (CET)

Rayo Vallecano (Spain)	1 – 3	(Russia) FK Rossiyanka
Adriana 86'		Petrova 4'; Ogbiagbevha 15'; Shmachkova 90+2'

Estadio Teresa Rivero, Madrid
Attendance: 3,462
Referee: (Germany) Christine Beck
7 October 2009
15:00 (MSK

FK Rossiyanka (Russia)	2 – 1	(Spain) Rayo Vallecano
Ogbiagbevha 6'; Danilova 55'		Pablos 73'

Stadion Rossiyanka, Krasnoarmeysk
Attendance: 750
Referee: (Austria) Tanja Schett

=== Round of 16 ===
4 November 2009
16:00 (MSK)

FK Rossiyanka (Russia)	0 – 1	(Sweden) Umeå IK
		Jakobsson 51'

Stadion Rossiyanka, Krasnoarmeysk
Attendance: 500
Referee: (Czech Republic) Dagmar Damková
11 November 2009
19:00 (CET)

Umeå IK (Sweden)	1 – 1	(Russia) FK Rossiyanka
Jakobsson 2'		Chorna 37'

Gammliavallen, Umeå
Attendance: 357
Referee: (Hungary) Gyöngyi Gaál

== 2010-11 UEFA Women's Champions League ==
=== Preliminary stage ===
5 August 2010
17:00 (CET)

ZNK Osijek (Croatia)	0 – 5	(Russia) FK Rossiyanka
		Shmachkova 41'; Ogbiagbevha 49'; Mokshanova 53'; Morozova 78'; Kharchenko 89'

Gradski vrt, Osijek
Attendance: 500
Referee: (Bulgaria) Aneliya Sinabova
7 August 2010
17:00 (CET)

FK Rossiyanka (Russia)	9 – 0	(Republic of Ireland) St. Francis FC
Ogbiagbevha 4', 34', 37', 42'; Morozova 20'; Chorna 26'; Mokshanova 43', 90+2'; Nyandeni 60'

Gradski vrt, Osijek
Attendance: 150
Referee: (Armenia) Knarik Grigoryan
10 August 2010
18:00 (CET)

FK Rossiyanka (Russia)	4 – 1	(Portugal) SU 1º Dezembro
Skotnikova 3'; Kharchenko 9'; Nyandeni 18'; Slonova 33'		Cristina 51'

Gradski vrt, Osijek
Attendance: 100
Referee: (Bulgaria) Aneliya Sinabova

=== Round of 32 ===
22 September 2010
17:00 (CET)

Lehenda Chernihiv (Ukraine)	1 – 3	(Russia) FK Rossiyanka
Melkonyants 32'		Petrova 49', 80'; Skotnikova 81'

Chernihiv
Attendance: 1,050
Referee: (Italy) Carina Vitulano
14 October 2010
15:00 (CET)

FK Rossiyanka (Russia)	4 – 0	(Ukraine) Lehenda Chernihiv
Nyandeni 4', 33'; Mokshanova 38'; Slonova 80'

Stadion Rossiyanka, Krasnoarmeysk
Attendance: 350
Referee: (Romania) Floarea Ionescu

=== Round of 16 ===
4 November 2010
14:15 (MSK)

FK Rossiyanka (Russia)	1 – 6	(France) Olympique Lyonnais
Ogbiagbevha 53'		Schelin 11', 30', 72', 79'; Abily 18'; Necib 81'

Stadion Rossiyanka, Krasnoarmeysk
Attendance: 1,000
Referee: (Greece) Efthalia Mitsi
10 November 2010
16:00 (CET)

Olympique Lyonnais (France)	5 – 0	(Russia) FK Rossiyanka
Le Sommer 22' (pen.); Kozhnikova 50' (o.g.); Bompastor 53'; Dickenmann 67'; Brétigny 89'

Stade de Gerland, Lyon
Attendance: 2,013
Referee: (England) Alexandra Ihringova

== 2011-12 UEFA Women's Champions League ==
=== Round of 32 ===
28 September 2011
19:00

Twente (Netherlands)	0 – 2	(Russia) FK Rossiyanka
		Cristiane 85'; Jakobsson 90+5'

De Adelaarshorst, Deventer
Attendance: 2,481
Referee: (Italy) Carina Vitulano
6 October 2011
14:00

FK Rossiyanka (Russia)	1 – 0	(Netherlands) Twente
Cristiane 87'

Krasnoarmeysk Stadium, Krasnoarmeysk
Attendance: 900
Referee: (Finland) Kirsi Heikkinen

=== Round of 16 ===
3 November 2011
17:00

Energiya Voronezh (Russia)	0 – 4	(Russia) FK Rossiyanka
		Jakobsson 44', 70', 81'; Chorna 68'

Central Stadium, Voronezh
Attendance: 2,500
Referee: (Hungary) Gyöngyi Gaál
9 November 2011
17:00

FK Rossiyanka (Russia)	3 – 3	(Russia) Energiya Voronezh
Cristiane 1', 40'; Morozova 10'		Ogbiagbevha 36'; Terekhova 55'; Danilova 68'

Krasnoarmeysk Stadium, Krasnoarmeysk
Attendance: 360
Referee: (Germany) Christine Baitinger

=== Quarter-finals ===
14 March 2012
18:00

Turbine Potsdam (Germany)	2 – 0	(Russia) FK Rossiyanka
Hanebeck 24'; Peter 44'

Karl-Liebknecht-Stadion, Potsdam
Attendance: 2,120
Referee: (Italy) Silvia Spinelli
22 March 2012
12:00

FK Rossiyanka (Russia)	0 – 3	(Germany) Turbine Potsdam
		Chorna 40' (o.g.); Nagasato 45+1', 77'

Trud Stadium, Podolsk
Attendance: 5,350
Referee: (Sweden) Jenny Palmqvist

== 2012-13 UEFA Women's Champions League ==
=== Round of 32 ===
27 September 2012
19:00

ADO Den Haag (Netherlands)	1 – 4	(Russia) FK Rossiyanka
Jansen 75'		Shlyapina 2' (pen.), 77' (pen.); Skotnikova 44', 63'

Zuiderpark Stadion, The Hague
Attendance: 500
Referee: (Malta) Esdther Azzopardi
4 October 2012
13:00

FK Rossiyanka (Russia)	1 – 2	(Netherlands) ADO Den Haag
Shlyapina 9'		Moudou 82'; Noyola 87'

Krasnoarmeysk Stadium, Krasnoarmeysk
Attendance: 250
Referee: (Romania) Teodora Albon

=== Round of 16 ===
1 November 2012
14:00

Sparta Praha (Czech Republic)	0 – 1	(Russia) FK Rossiyanka
		Oparanozie 12'

Stadion SK Prosek, Prague
Attendance: 525
Referee: (Norway) Christina W. Pedersen
8 November 2012
14:00

FK Rossiyanka (Russia)	2 – 2	(Czech Republic) Sparta Praha
Vyštejnová 53' (o.g.); Fabiana 63'		Voňková 3'; Danihelková 90+4'

Rodina Stadium, Khimki
Attendance: 100
Referee: (Hungary) Katalin Kulcsár

=== Quarter-finals ===
20 March 2013
18:00

VfL Wolfsburg (Germany)	2 – 1	(Russia) FK Rossiyanka
Popp 5'; Müller 32'		Henning 46' (o.g.)

Volkswagen Arena, Wolfsburg
Attendance: 1,971
Referee: (Romania) Cristina Dorcioman
28 March 2013
16:30

Rossiyanka (Russia)	0 – 2	(Germany) VfL Wolfsburg
		Pohlers 71'; Goeßling 88'

Luzhniki Stadium, Moscow
Attendance: 800
Referee: (Finland) Kirsi Heikkinen

== 2013-14 UEFA Women's Champions League ==
=== Round of 32 ===
9 October 2013
15:00

Spartak Subotica (Serbia)	2 – 4	(Russia) FK Rossiyanka
Nahi 3'; Meffometou 80'		Shlyapina 24', 37' (pen.), 48'; Nyandeni 27'

Subotica City Stadium, Subotica
Attendance: 800
Referee: (Romania) Floarea Ionescu
17 October 2013
13:00

Rossiyanka (Russia)	1 – 1	(Serbia) Spartak Subotica
Yakovyshyn 87'		M. Nikolić 5'

Krasnoarmeysk Stadium, Krasnoarmeysk
Attendance: 330
Referee: (France) Séverine Zinck

=== Round of 16 ===
9 November 2013
11:00

FK Rossiyanka (Russia)	1 – 0	(Italy) ASD Torres
Cimini 18' (o.g.)

Krasnoarmeysk Stadium, Krasnoarmeysk
Attendance: 334
Referee: (Scotland) Morag Pirie
14 November 2013
15:00

ASD Torres (Italy)	2 – 0	(Russia) FK Rossiyanka
Conti 27'; Panico 63'

Stadio Vanni Sanna, Sassari
Attendance: 277
Referee: (Switzerland) Esther Staubli

== 2016-17 UEFA Women's Champions League ==
=== Round of 32 ===
5 October 2016
16:00

SFK Sarajevo (Bosnia and Herzegovina)	0 – 0	(Russia) FK Rossiyanka

Asim Ferhatović Hase Stadium, Sarajevo
Attendance: 570
Referee: (Belgium) Lois Otte
13 October 2016
18:00

FK Rossiyanka (Russia)	2 – 1	(Bosnia and Herzegovina) SFK Sarajevo
Nrehy 50'; Nahi 90+4'		Djoković 70' (pen.)

Rodina Stadium, Khimki
Attendance: 300
Referee: (Switzerland) Désirée Grundbacher

=== Round of 16 ===
9 November 2016
18:00

Bayern Munich (Germany)	4 – 0	(Russia) FK Rossiyanka
Evans 41'; Rolser 45+2'; Miedema 52', 75'

Grünwalder Stadion, Munich
Attendance: 410
Referee: (Portugal) Sandra Bastos
17 November 2016
18:00

FK Rossiyanka (Russia)	0 – 4	(Germany) Bayern Munich
		Miedema 42', 52'; Däbritz 72'; Holstad Berge 90+2'

Rodina Stadium, Khimki
Attendance: 500
Referee: (France) Stéphanie Frappart
