= 2011–12 Russian Women's Football Championship =

The 2011–12 Russian Women's Football Championship was the 20th edition of the Russian premier championship for women's football teams. Like the 2011–12 Russian Premier League, it marked the competition's transition from its traditional spring to autumn model to the Western autumn to spring calendar, running from 16 April 2011 to 28 June 2012. It was contested by eight teams, one more than the previous edition, with Zorky Krasnogorsk and Mordovochka Saransk joining the championship. Defending champion WFC Rossiyanka won its fourth title with a 17 points advantage over newcomer Zorky, which also qualified for the UEFA Champions League as the runner-up. Five-times champion Energiya Voronezh withdrew from the championship following the end of the season for financial reasons.

== Teams by federal subject ==
Locations of the 2011–12 teams

Federal subject	Club
Moscow Oblast	3: ShVSM Izmailovo, WFC Rossiyanka, Zorky Krasnogorsk
Krasnodar Krai	1: Kubanochka Krasnodar
Republic of Mordovia	1: Mordovochka Saransk
Perm Krai	1: Zvezda Perm
Ryazan Oblast	1: Ryazan VDV
(Voronezh Oblast) Voronezh oblast	1: Energiya Voronezh

== Table ==
Pos	Team	Pld	W	D	L	GF	GF	Pts	Q/R
1	Rossiyanka	28	23	3	2	85	20	72	2012-13 UEFA Champions League
2	Zorky Krasnogorsk	28	17	4	7	58	31	55	2012-13 UEFA Champions League
3	Energiya Voronezh	28	17	3	8	66	25	54	
4	Zvezda Perm	28	15	4	9	58	37	49	
5	Izmailovo	28	9	3	16	26	43	30	
6	Ryazan	28	6	6	16	24	48	24	
7	Kubanochka Krasnodar	28	7	3	18	19	53	24	
8	Mordovochka Saransk	28	4	2	22	17	96	14	Relegated

== Results ==
	ROS	ZOR	ENE	ZVE	IZM	RYA	KUB	MOR
Rossiyanka		2–2 4–4	2–0 2–3	3–0 2–2	3–1 6–0	4–0 2–0	4–0 2–0	7–0 5–0
Zorky Krasnogorsk	1–2 2–1		0–3 2–1	1–4 0–2	1–2 3–0	1–0 6–0	1–0 2–0	5–0 4–1
Energiya Voronezh	0–2 0–1	1–0 3–1		3–2 1–0	1–1 2–2	3–0 0–1	3–0 0–1	7–0 5–0
Zvezda Perm	1–4 0–2	1–3 1–1	2–4 2–1		0–1 1–1	4–1 1–0	5–0 2–2	4–0 5–0
Izmailovo	0–1 1–3	0–1 0–2	0–1 0–2	0–3 2–3		0–3 0–1	1–2 1–0	3–0 2–0
Ryazan	1–2 1–4	0–0 0–1	1–1 0–2	0–2 1–3	0–2 2–1		0–2 0–0	1–1 5–2
Kubanochka Krasnodar	0–4 1–2	0–2 1–3	0–7 0–3	3–0 0–2	0–1 2–1	1–1 2–0		0–1 1–0
Mordovochka Saransk	0–4 0–5	2–4 0–5	0–7 3–2	0–4 1–2	0–1 0–2	1–1 0–4	4–1 1–0	

== Top scorers ==
Rank	Player	Team	Goals
1	(Nigeria) Emueje Ogbiagbevha	Rossiyanka	15
2	(Russia) Olesya Kurochkina	Zvezda Perm	13
2	(Mexico) Fátima Leyva	Zorky Krasnogorsk	13
4	(Russia) Elena Morozova	Zorky Krasnogorsk	12
4	(Russia) Olga Petrova	Rossiyanka	12
4	(Russia) Natalia Shlyapina	Rossiyanka	12
7	(Russia) Elena Danilova	Energiya Voronezh	11
7	(Russia) Ekaterina Sochneva	Zorky Krasnogorsk	11
9	(Brazil) Cristiane de Souza	Rossiyanka	10
10	(Romania) Georgiana Birtoiu	Rossiyanka	9
10	(Russia) Oksana Ryabinicheva	Zorky Krasnogorsk	9
