= Natalia Pertseva =

Russian footballer (born 1984)

Personal information
- Full name: Natalia Aleksandrovna Pertseva
- Date of birth: 4 June 1984 (age 42)
- Place of birth: Soviet Union
- Height: 1.70 m (5 ft 7 in)
- Position: Defender

Senior career*
Years	Team	Apps	(Gls)
2001–2003	Nadezhda Noginsk		
2004–2017	Rossiyanka		(2)

International career
2004–2013	Russia	31	(1)
- * Club domestic league appearances and goals

Natalia Pertseva is a retired Russian football defender mostly played for Rossiyanka Krasnoarmeysk in the Russian Championship. She began her career in Nadezhda Noginsk.

She was a member of the Russian national team since 2002, taking part in the 2009 European Championship.
