= Pamela Conti =

Italian football player and manager

Personal information
- Date of birth: 4 April 1982 (age 44)
- Place of birth: Palermo, Italy
- Height: 1.66 m (5 ft 5 in)
- Position: Striker

Team information
- Current team: Querétaro (women) (Manager)

Senior career*
Years	Team	Apps	(Gls)
1996–1999	Aquile Palermo		
1999–2008	Sassari Torres	185	(95)
2008–2009	Levante	23	(16)
2009	Buffalo Flash		
2009–2010	Espanyol	27	(26)
2010–2011	Levante	18	(11)
2011	Energiya Voronezh	4	(1)
2012–2013	Zorky Krasnogorsk	27	(18)
2013–2014	Sassari Torres	18	(12)
2014	Eskilstuna United	2	(0)

International career
1998–2013	Italy	90	(30)

Managerial career
- 2018: Atletico Madrid Women U17
- 2019–2024: Venezuela Women
- 2019–2024: Venezuela Women U20
- 2026: India Women U17
- 2026–: Querétaro (women)
- * Club domestic league appearances and goals

Pamela Conti (born 4 April 1982) is an Italian football manager and former player, who is currently serving as the head coach of the India women's national U17 team. As a player she was an attacking midfielder or striker for clubs in Serie A, Spain, Russia, the United States and Sweden, as well as for the Italy national team. She won two Italian Leagues, four Italian Cups, one Spanish Cup and one Russian League, and she represented Italy at two European Championships.

== Career ==
=== As a player ===
Born in Palermo on 4 April 1982, she started her career in 1996 at Aquile Palermo. Despite playing in the third-tier, in May 1998 she made her debut for the Italian national team against Finland in the 1999 World Cup qualifying at 16 years old. The next year Conti signed for Serie A runners-up Torres CF, where she played for the next 10 years, winning two championships and four national cups, making her UEFA Women's Cup debut, and scoring 95 goals in 185 games in Serie A. In 2005, she made her debut at an international final tournament in the 2005 European Championship, where Italy was knocked out in the group stage.

In 2008 Conti moved to Spanish league champion Levante UD to again play the UEFA Women's Cup. Following the end of the season and playing the 2009 European Championship and the 2009 W-League with Buffalo Flash in the summer, she moved to national cup champion RCD Espanyol. Despite scoring 26 goals and winning the cup in her only season in Espanyol she returned to a declining Levante for the 2010-11 season.

In 2011, she signed for Russian Championship's runner-up Energiya Voronezh. However, after Energiya was knocked out of the UEFA Champions League's Round of 16 she moved to Zorky Krasnogorsk, where she played for two seasons. There she won the championship and again played the Champions League. On the other hand, she wasn't called up for the 2013 European Championship. She completed her international career with 90 caps and 30 goals.

In 2013, she returned to Torres CF, now a national powerhouse, after five years abroad. It proved to be a turbulent period for the Sardinian giants and Conti left for Swedish club Eskilstuna United DFF. But she retired from playing after making just two appearances for Eskilstuna, returning to Sicily and setting up a football school for youngsters.

=== As a manager ===
Conti was hired as an under-16 coach by Atlético Madrid in summer 2018. In October 2019 she was appointed head coach of the Venezuela women's national football team. She aimed to guide the team to its first ever FIFA Women's World Cup qualification. She also coached the Venezuela women's national U20 team in that period and lead the team at the 2022 South American Under-20 Women's Football Championship and the 2024 FIFA U-20 Women's World Cup.

In 2026, All India Football Federation (AIFF) appointed Conti as the head coach of the India women's national U17 team, before the 2026 AFC U-17 Women's Asian Cup which is also the qualifier tournament for the 2026 FIFA U-17 Women's World Cup for nations in the Asian Football Confederation (AFC).

== National team ==
On 2 October 2010, she scored against Ukraine for the FIFA Women's World Cup qualification at the Stadion Yuri Gagarin in Chernihiv.

== Personal life ==
Conti's father Francesco Conti was a footballer for Palermo and died in 2018. Her brothers Vincenzo and Daniele were also professional footballers who developed in the youth system at Palermo.

== Honours ==
Torres Calcio

- Serie A: 1999–00, 2000–01
- Italian Women's Cup: 1999–00, 2000–01, 2003–04, 2004–05, 2007–08
- Italian Women's Super Cup: 2000, 2004
- Italy Women's Cup: 2004, 2008
