= Lyudmyla Pekur =

Ukrainian footballer (born 1981)

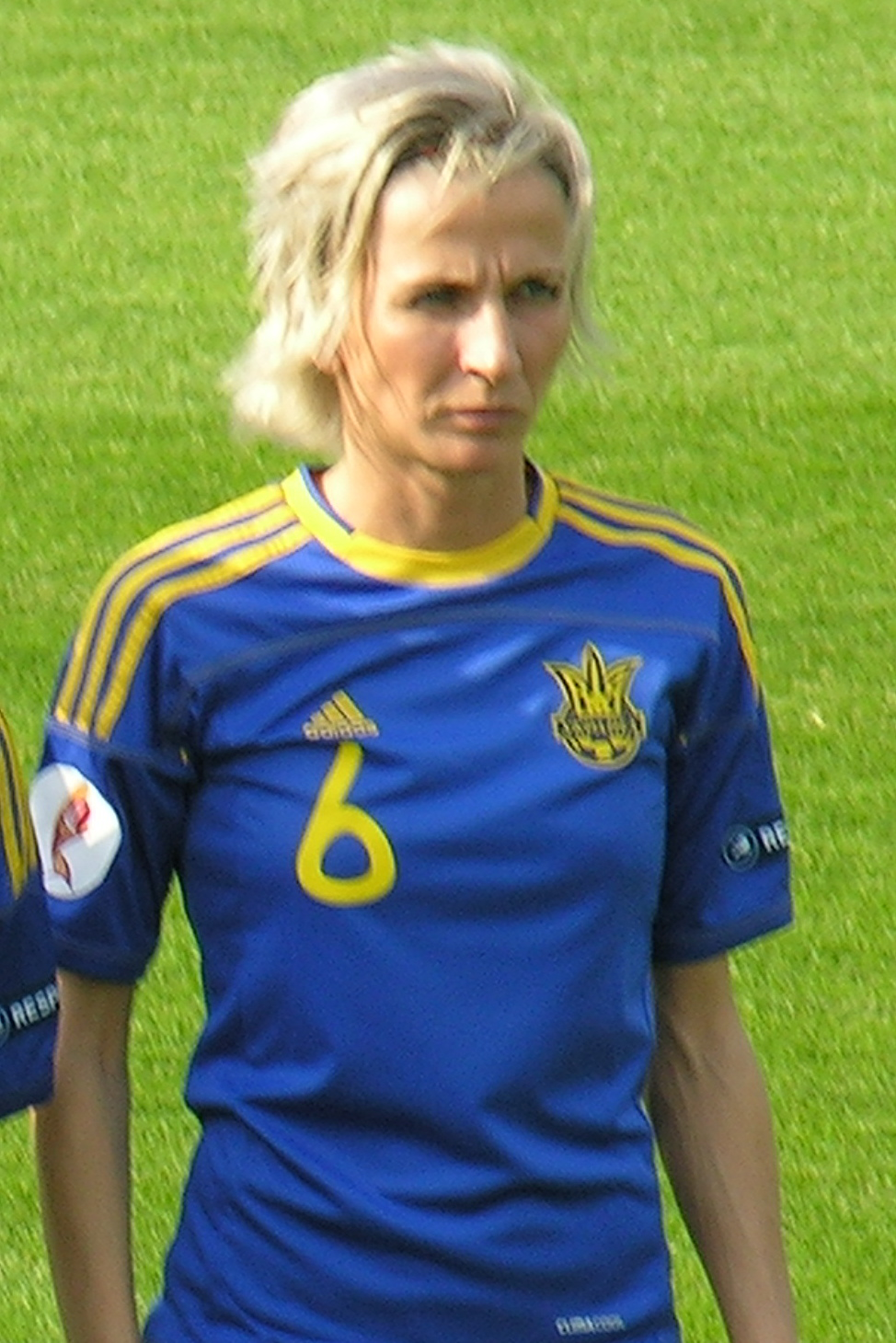

Personal information
- Full name: Lyudmyla Pekur
- Date of birth: 6 January 1981 (age 45)
- Place of birth: Chernihiv, Ukrainian SSR, Soviet Union
- Position: Midfielder

Senior career*
Years	Team	Apps	(Gls)
1995—1998	Lehenda Chernihiv	41	(9)
1999—2000	Metalist Kharkiv	12	(5)
2005	Kubanochka		
2006	Nadezhda Noginsk		
2007–2009	Rossiyanka		
2010	Energiya Voronezh	20	(10)
2011–2012	Zvezda Perm	21	(8)
2012–2016	Ryazan	33	(9)

International career
1997–2016	Ukraine	110	(?)
- * Club domestic league appearances and goals as of 13 January 2014

Lyudmyla Pekur (Ukrainian: Людмила Михайлівна Пекур) (born 6 January 1981 in Chernihiv) is a former Ukrainian footballer who last played for Ryazan VDV in the Russian Championship. She previously played for Lehenda Chernihiv and Zhytlobud-1 Kharkiv in the Ukrainian league and Kubanochka, Nadezhda Noginsk, Rossiyanka, Energiya Voronezh and Zvezda Perm in the Russian Championship. She first played the UEFA Women's Cup in 2004 with Metalist, and later with Rossiyanka and Zvezda.

She was a member of the Ukrainian national team. In the 2009 European Championship she scored the winner in Ukraine's victory over the host Finland, sealing Ukraine's first win in an official women's football international tournament.

She is the first Ukrainian player to have made 100 or more appearances for her national teams.

== Official international goals ==
- 2003 World Cup qualification
  - 1 in Ukraine 4–1 Czech Republic
- 2005 European Championship qualification
  - 1 in Portugal 1–2 Ukraine
- 2007 World Cup qualification
  - 1 in Ukraine 2–1 Serbia and Montenegro
  - 1 in Ukraine 6–0 Greece
- 2009 European Championship qualification
  - 1 in Slovakia 0–4 Ukraine
  - 1 in Ukraine 5–0 Slovakia
- 2009 European Championship
  - 1 in Ukraine 1–0 Finland
- 2011 World Cup qualification
  - 1 in Poland 4–1 Ukraine
  - 2 in Ukraine 7–0 Bosnia and Herzegovina
