= Nadezhda Kharchenko =

Russian footballer (born 1987)

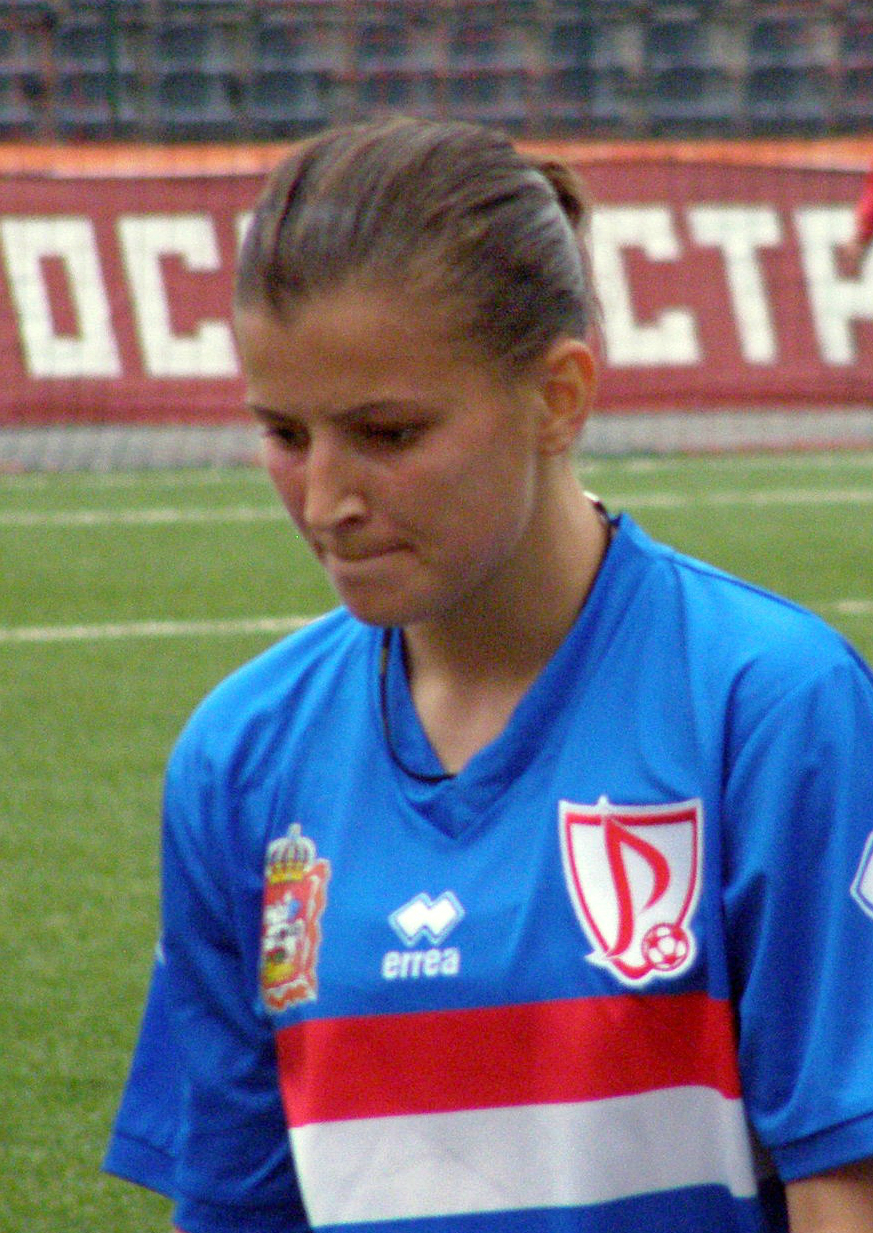

Personal information
- Full name: Nadezhda Alexandrovna Kharchenko
- Date of birth: 27 March 1987 (age 39)
- Place of birth: Soviet Union
- Position: Midfielder

Senior career*
Years	Team	Apps	(Gls)
2004	CSK VVS Samara		
2005–2006	Prialit Reutov		
2007–2011	Rossiyanka	24	(2)
2012–2014	Zorky Krasnogorsk		

International career
2007–2011	Russia	8	(1)
- * Club domestic league appearances and goals

Nadezhda Kharchenko (born 27 March 1987) is a former Russian football midfielder, who played for Zorky Krasnogorsk in the Russian Championship.

She is a member of the Russian national team, and took part in the 2009 European Championship. As an Under-19 international she won the 2005 U-19 Euro.

== Titles ==
- 2005 Under-19 European Championship
- 2 Russian Leagues (2005, 2010)
- 4 Russian Cups (2005, 2008, 2009, 2010)
