= Natalia Russkikh =

Tajikistani-Russian footballer

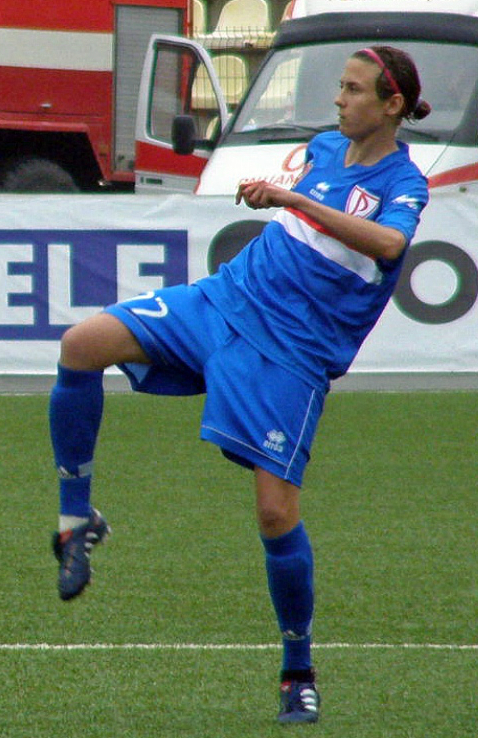

Personal information
- Full name: Natalia Russkikh
- Date of birth: 6 July 1985 (age 41)
- Place of birth: Chkalovsk, Tajikistan SSR
- Position: Defender

Senior career*
Years	Team	Apps	(Gls)
2004–2005	Lada Togliatti		
2006–2013	Rossiyanka		
2007	→ FC Khimki (loan)		
2013–2014	Zorky Krasnogorsk		

International career
- Russia
- * Club domestic league appearances and goals

Natalia Russkikh is a former Tajikistani-Russian football defender, who played for Zorky Krasnogorsk in the Russian Championship. A former player of Lada Togliatti, she has won the Championship and played the UEFA Champions League with both teams.

She first played for the Russian national team in the 2011 World Cup qualifiers.
