= Anastasia Slonova =

Anastasia Slonova may refer to:

- Anastassiya Slonova (born 1991), Kazakhstani cross-country skier
- Anastasia Slonova (footballer) (born 1984), Moldovan football forward
