= Nyandeni =

Nyandeni may refer to

- Mpumi Nyandeni (born 1989), South African football midfielder
- Nompumelelo Nyandeni (born 1987), South African football forward
- Nyandeni Local Municipality in the Eastern Cape of South Africa
