= Irina Podshibyakina =

Russian footballer (born 1995)

Personal information
- Full name: Irina Valeryevna Podshibyakina
- Date of birth: 5 July 1995 (age 31)
- Place of birth: Moscow, Russia
- Height: 1.76 m (5 ft 9 in)
- Position: Defender

Team information
- Current team: Lokomotiv Moscow

Senior career*
| Years | Team | Apps | (Gls) |
| 2014 | Izmailovo | 5 | (0) |
| 2014–2015 | Zorky | 10 | (1) |
| 2017–2020 | Zvezda Perm | 42 | (1) |
| 2021- | Lokomotiv Moscow | 0 | (0) |

International career^{‡}
| 2017– | Russia | 14 | (0) |
- * Club domestic league appearances and goals as of 01:30, 06 September 2019 (UTC) ‡ National team caps and goals as of 01:35, 06 September 2019 (UTC)

Irina Valeryevna Podshibyakina (Russian: Ирина Валерьевна Подшибякина; born 5 July 1995) is a Russian footballer who plays as a defender and has appeared for the Russia women's national team.

== Career ==
Podshibyakina has been capped for the Russia national team, appearing for the team during the 2019 FIFA Women's World Cup qualifying cycle.
