= Oksana Shmachkova =

Russian footballer (born 1981)

Personal information
- Date of birth: 20 June 1981 (age 45)
- Place of birth: Rayevskaya, Krasnodar Krai, USSR
- Position: Defender

Senior career*
Years	Team	Apps	(Gls)
2009–2010	Rossiyanka	34	(5)

International career
1999–2011	Russia	32	(1)
- * Club domestic league appearances and goals

Oksana Shmachkova (Russian: Оксана Шмачкова; born 20 June 1981 in Rayevskaya) is retired a Russian women's international footballer who played as a defender. She was a member of the Russia women's national football team. She was part of the team at the 2003 FIFA Women's World Cup as well as UEFA Women's Euro 2001 and 2009. On club level she played for various clubs in Russia including FC Energy Voronezh and WFC Rossiyanka.
