= Olga Petrova (footballer) =

Russian footballer (born 1986)

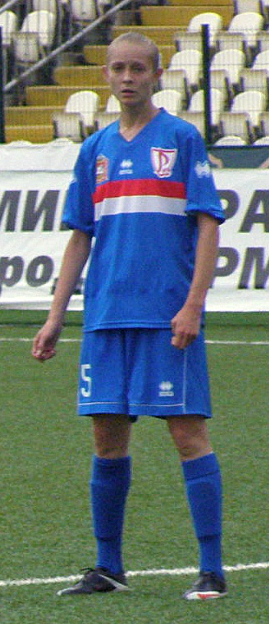

Personal information
- Full name: Olga Evgenievna Petrova
- Date of birth: 9 July 1986 (age 40)
- Place of birth: Soviet Union
- Height: 1.74 m (5 ft 9 in)
- Position: Midfielder

Senior career*
Years	Team	Apps	(Gls)
2001–2003	Esenya Rybnoye		(14)
2003–2004	Nadezhda Noginsk		(1)
2004–2013	Rossiyanka		(51)
2014	Wolfsburg		(0)
2014	Ryazan		

International career^{‡}
- Russia U19
	Russia	55	(8)
- * Club domestic league appearances and goals ‡ National team caps and goals as of 13:42, 19 July 2013 (UTC)

Olga Evgenievna Petrova is a former Russian international football midfielder, who played for Ryazan. She has won four Russian leagues, five National Cups, and the 2005 U-19 Euro.

She took part in the 2009 Euro and 2013 Euro.

== Career ==
Having spent nine years at Rossiyanka, in December 2013, she headed for UEFA Champions League winners Wolfsburg, signing a one-and-a-half-year contract. Three months later, she returned to Russia because of homesickness. She only played two matches in the second team of Wolfsburg.
