= Sofia Jakobsson =

Swedish footballer (born 1990)

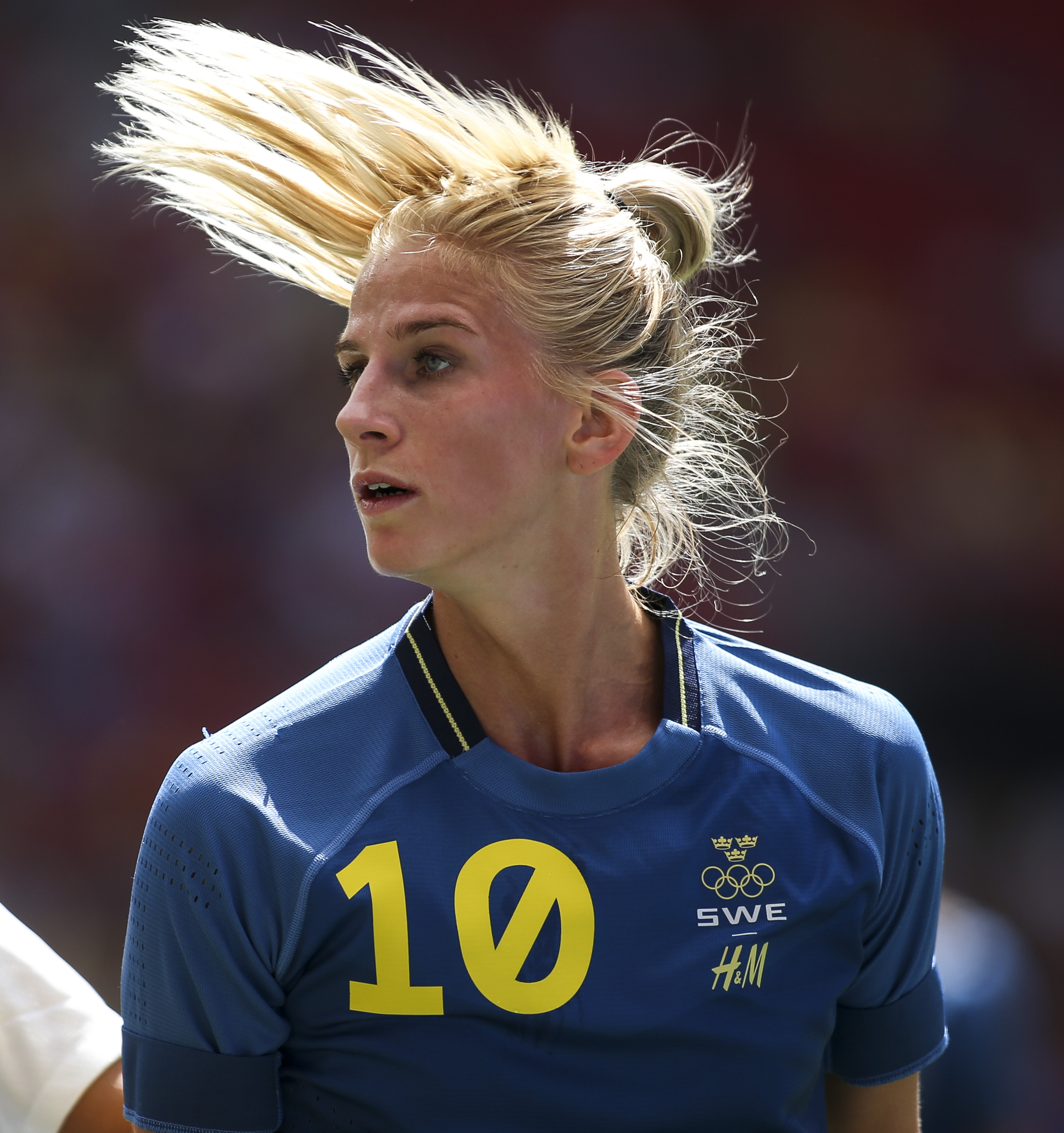
- Jakobsson with Sweden at the 2016 Summer Olympics

Personal information
- Full name: Eva Sofia Jakobsson
- Date of birth: 23 April 1990 (age 36)
- Place of birth: Örnsköldsvik, Sweden
- Height: 1.74 m (5 ft 9 in)
- Position: Forward

Team information
- Current team: Toluca
- Number: 17

Senior career*
Years	Team	Apps	(Gls)
2006	Hägglunds IoFK		
2007	Östers IF	21	(9)
2007–2011	Umeå IK	58	(18)
2011–2013	WFC Rossiyanka	13	(9)
2013	Chelsea	11	(6)
2013–2014	BV Cloppenburg	22	(5)
2014–2019	Montpellier HSC	91	(50)
2019–2020	CD Tacón	20	(9)
2020–2021	Real Madrid	33	(11)
2021	Bayern Munich	5	(2)
2022–2024	San Diego Wave	48	(4)
2024–2026	London City Lionesses	17	(3)
2026–	Toluca	8	(1)

International career^{‡}
2011–	Sweden	166	(23)
Medal record
Women's football
Representing Sweden
Olympic Games
Silver medal – second place	2016 Rio de Janeiro	Team
Silver medal – second place	2020 Tokyo	Team
FIFA Women's World Cup
Bronze medal – third place	2011 Germany	Team
Bronze medal – third place	2019 France	Team
Bronze medal – third place	2023 Australia–New Zealand	Team
- * Club domestic league appearances and goals as of 6 September 2025 ‡ National team caps and goals as of 15 July 2025

Eva Sofia Jakobsson (Swedish: [eːva sʊfiːa ˈjɑ̌ːkɔbˌsɔn]; born 23 April 1990) is a Swedish professional footballer who plays for Toluca and the Sweden women's national football team.

She made her debut for the Sweden women's national football team in 2011 and won her 100th cap in 2019. Jakobsson represented her country in the 2013 edition of the UEFA Women's Championship, as well as at the 2011, 2015, and 2019 FIFA Women's World Cups. She also played at the 2012, 2016, and 2020 Olympic football tournaments.

== Club career ==
After playing one season in the second tier for Östers IF, Jakobsson signed in 2007, at 17, for national champion Umeå IK. In her five seasons in Umeå she won two championships and one national cup, and she made her UEFA Women's Cup debut. After Umeå lost its dominant position in the Damallsvenskan since 2009, Jakobsson transferred to Russian champion WFC Rossiyanka to again play the UEFA Women's Champions League.

Jakobsson signed for Chelsea Ladies in January 2013. She scored on her debut in a 1–1 draw with Birmingham, and then scored a brace in her next game against Doncaster Rovers Belles. She scored in her third consecutive Women's Super League game in a 2–1 win over the Liverpool Ladies. She scored two more goals in the remaining eight games, ending as Chelsea's top scorer along with Eniola Aluko.

With three WSL games remaining until the end of the season she moved to the German Bundesliga alongside teammate Ester, signing for newly promoted team BV Cloppenburg. In July 2014, Jakobsson signed for Montpellier HSC of the French Division 1 Féminine.

In July 2019, Jakobsson joined Real Madrid Feminino of the Spanish Primera División, who at that time went under the name CD Tacon, along with her national teammate, Kosovare Asllani. During her first season in Spain, Jakobsson scored most goals and most assists in the capital club scoring eight goals and seven assists.

In June 2021, Jakobsson announced that she was departing Real Madrid. On 2 July 2021, she signed with Bayern Munich in the top German league, the Frauen-Bundesliga. Jakobsson made only five appearances with Bayern Munich, and in January 2022, was signed by the American team San Diego Wave FC of the National Women's Soccer League.

On 11 September 2024, Jakobsson and the San Diego Wave agreed to a mutual contract termination. Jakobsson had played in 52 matches and made 30 starts in her tenure with the Californian club. Two days after the announcement of her departure from the Wave, Jakobsson signed with Women's Championship club London City Lionesses on a two-year contract.

On 29 January 2026, Jakobsson and London City Lionesses agreed to mutually terminate her contract. The same day, she was announced at Toluca.

== International career ==
Jakobsson made her debut for the Sweden national team in 2011. She has represented Sweden in three World Cups (Germany 2011, Canada 2015, France 2019) and three Olympic Games (London 2012, Rio 2016, Tokyo 2020.) Her squad finished in third place in two of those World Cups (2011 and 2019), and won silver medals both in Rio and in Tokyo. She also appeared at the 2013 European Championship. Jakobsson was the top scorer of the 2015 Algarve Cup, netting four times for Sweden.

Jakobsson suffered an anterior cruciate ligament injury in January 2017 while training with her French club. She was ruled out of Sweden's squad for UEFA Women's Euro 2017.

In April 2019, Jakobsson won her 100th cap, marking the occasion with a goal in Sweden's 2–0 friendly win over Austria in Maria Enzersdorf.

In the quarter-final of the 2019 FIFA Women's World Cup, Jakobsson scored a game-tying goal within ten minutes of Germany taking an early lead. Sweden would go on to win the match, posting their first victory over the Germans in a major tournament since the 1995 World Cup. She also tallied what proved to be the winning goal in the 3rd Place Match of that tournament, scoring in the 22nd minute against England.

Jakobsson was voted as the player of the match in the Quarter-Final vs Germany, and the 3rd Place Match against England.

On 13 June 2023, she was included in the 23-player squad for the 2023 FIFA Women's World Cup.

== Career statistics ==
=== International ===
Scores and results list Sweden's goal tally first, score column indicates score after each Jakobsson goal.

List of international goals scored by Sofia Jakobsson
No.	Date	Venue	Opponent	Score	Result	Competition	Ref.
1	2011-11-20	Phoenix, United States	United States	1–0	1–1	Friendly	
2	2012-05-26	Kirkcaldy, Scotland	Scotland	3–1	4–1	Friendly	
3	2012-05-26	Kirkcaldy, Scotland	Scotland	4–1	4–1	Friendly	
4	2012-07-31	Newcastle upon Tyne, England	Canada	2–0	2–2	2012 Summer Olympics	
5	2012-10-23	Växjö, Sweden	Switzerland	1–0	3–0	Friendly	
6	2015-02-12	Uusimaa, Finland	Finland	2–0	3–0	Friendly	
7	2015-03-04	Vila Real de Santo António	Germany	2–2	4–2	2015 Algarve Cup	
8	2015-03-04	Vila Real de Santo António	Germany	4–2	4–2	2015 Algarve Cup	
9	2015-03-09	Vila Real de Santo António	China	3–0	3–0	2015 Algarve Cup	
10	2015-03-11	Parchal, Portugal	Germany	1–2	1–2	2015 Algarve Cup	
11	2015-06-16	Edmonton, Canada	Australia	1–1	1–1	2015 FIFA Women's World Cup	
12	2016-01-26	Gothenburg, Sweden	Scotland	3–0	6–0	Friendly	
13	2017-01-19	La Manga, Spain	Norway	1–0	1–2	Friendly	
14	2018-04-05	Szombathely, Hungary	Hungary	2–0	4–1	2019 World Cup qualification	
15	2018-09-04	Viborg, Denmark	Denmark	1–0	1–0	2019 World Cup qualification	
16	2018-11-11	Rotherham, England	England	1–0	2–0	Friendly	
17	2019-04-09	Maria Enzersdorf, Austria	Austria	1–0	2–0	Friendly	
18	2019-06-29	Rennes, France	Germany	1–1	2–1	2019 FIFA Women's World Cup	
19	2019-07-06	Nice, France	England	2–0	2–1	2019 FIFA Women's World Cup	
20	2019-10-04	Miskolc, Hungary	Hungary	4–0	5–0	Euro 2022 qualifying	
21	2020-03-10	Faro/Loulé, Portugal	Portugal	1–0	2–0	2020 Algarve Cup	
22	2020-10-27	Gothenburg, Sweden	Iceland	1–0	2–0	Euro 2022 qualifying	
23	2021-02-19	Paola, Malta	Austria	6–1	6–1	Friendly	

== Honours ==
Umeå IK

- Damallsvenskan: 2007, 2008
- Svenska Cupen: 2007
- Svenska Supercupen: 2007, 2008

WFC Rossiyanka

- Russian Championship: 2011–12

San Diego Wave

- NWSL Shield: 2023
- NWSL Challenge Cup: 2024

Sweden

- Summer Olympic Games: Silver Medal 2016
- FIFA Women's World Cup: Bronze Medal 2019
- Algarve Cup: 2018

== See also ==
- List of foreign Women's Super League players
