= Olesya Kurochkina =

Russian footballer (born 1983)

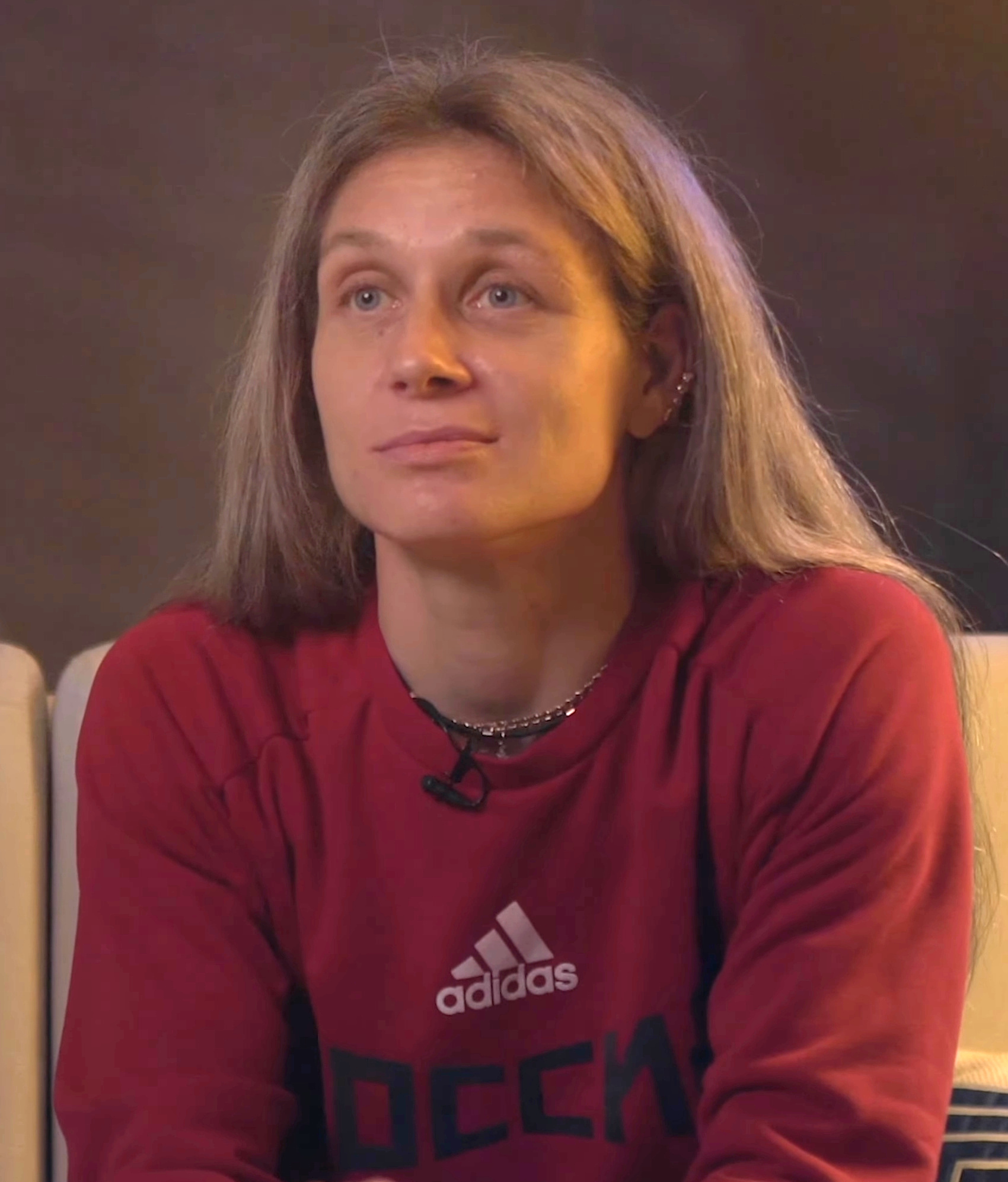
- Kurochkina in 2021

Personal information
- Full name: Olesya Anatolyevna Kurochkina
- Date of birth: 6 September 1983 (age 43)
- Place of birth: Moscow, Soviet Union
- Height: 1.76 m (5 ft 9 in)
- Position: Striker

Team information
- Current team: Zvezda Perm
- Number: 7

Senior career*
Years	Team	Apps	(Gls)
1998–2003	Chertanovo		
2003	Gömrükçü Baku		
2004	Prialit Reutov		
2005–2006	Nadezhda Noginsk		(30)
2007–2012	Zvezda Perm	60	(38)
2012–2013	CSP Izmailovo	19	(16)
2013–2014	Zorky Krasnogorsk	18	(3)
2014	Mordovochka Saransk	4	(1)
2015–	Zvezda Perm	137	(60)

International career^{‡}
	Russia	51	(19)
- * Club domestic league appearances and goals as of 00:05, 15 October 2022 UTC) ‡ National team caps and goals as of 17:51, 15 July 2013 (UTC)

Olesya Kurochkina is a Russian football striker, currently playing for Zvezda Perm in the Russian Women's Football Championship.

She is a member of the Russian national team, and took part in the 2009 European Championship where she scored Russia's last goal in the competition.

== Titles ==
- 3 Russian Leagues (2007, 2008, 2009)
- 1 Russian Cup (2007)
