= Anastasia Slonova (footballer) =

Moldovan footballer

Personal information
- Full name: Anastasia Slonova
- Date of birth: 17 May 1984 (age 42)
- Place of birth: Soviet Union (now Moldova)
- Position: Forward

Senior career*
Years	Team	Apps	(Gls)
2001–2003	Codru Chişinău		
2003–2004	Nadezhda Noginsk		
2004–2005	Narta Chişinău		
2005–2009	Nadezhda Noginsk		
2010–2011	WFC Rossiyanka	39	(5)
2012–2015	Zorky Krasnogorsk		

International career
2001–2006	Moldova	11	(3)
- * Club domestic league appearances and goals

Anastasia Slonova is a former Moldovan football forward, who played for Zorky Krasnogorsk in the Russian Championship. She previously played for Codru Chişinău – with whom she first played the UEFA Women's Cup in 2001, and Narta Drăsliceni in the Moldovan Championship, and Nadezhda Noginsk in Russia.

She has been a member of the currently inactive Moldovan national team.

== See also ==
- List of Moldova women's international footballers
