= Tatyana Skotnikova =

Russian footballer (born 1978)

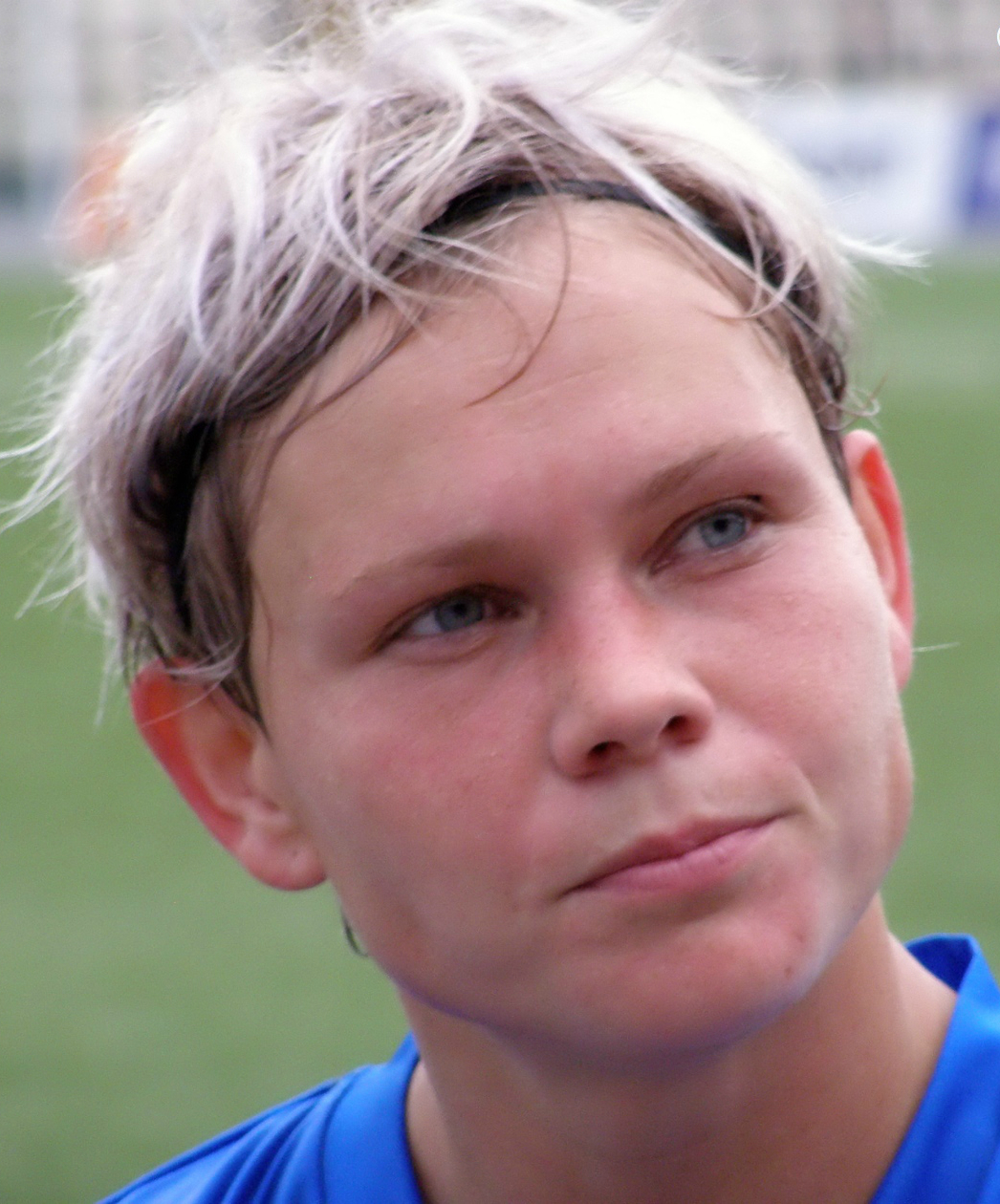

Personal information
- Full name: Tatyana Viktorovna Skotnikova
- Date of birth: 27 November 1978 (age 47)
- Place of birth: Soviet Union
- Height: 1.66 m (5 ft 5 in)
- Position: Midfielder

Youth career
- Lada Togliatti

Senior career*
Years	Team	Apps	(Gls)
1994–2001	Lada Togliatti		
2002–2004	Energiya Voronezh		
2005–2010	Rossiyanka		
2011–2012	Zvezda Perm	14	(1)
2012–2013	Rossiyanka		
2014–2015	Zorky Krasnogorsk		
2017	CSKA Moscow		

International career^{‡}
2000–2013	Russia	89	(9)
- * Club domestic league appearances and goals ‡ National team caps and goals as of 20:03, 12 July 2013 (UTC)

Tatiana Skotnikova (Russian: Татьяна Скотникова) is a former Russian football midfielder, who played for CSKA Moscow in the Russian Championship.

She was the captain of the Russian national team, and served as such in the 2009 European Championship.
