= Elena Morozova =

Russian footballer (born 1987)

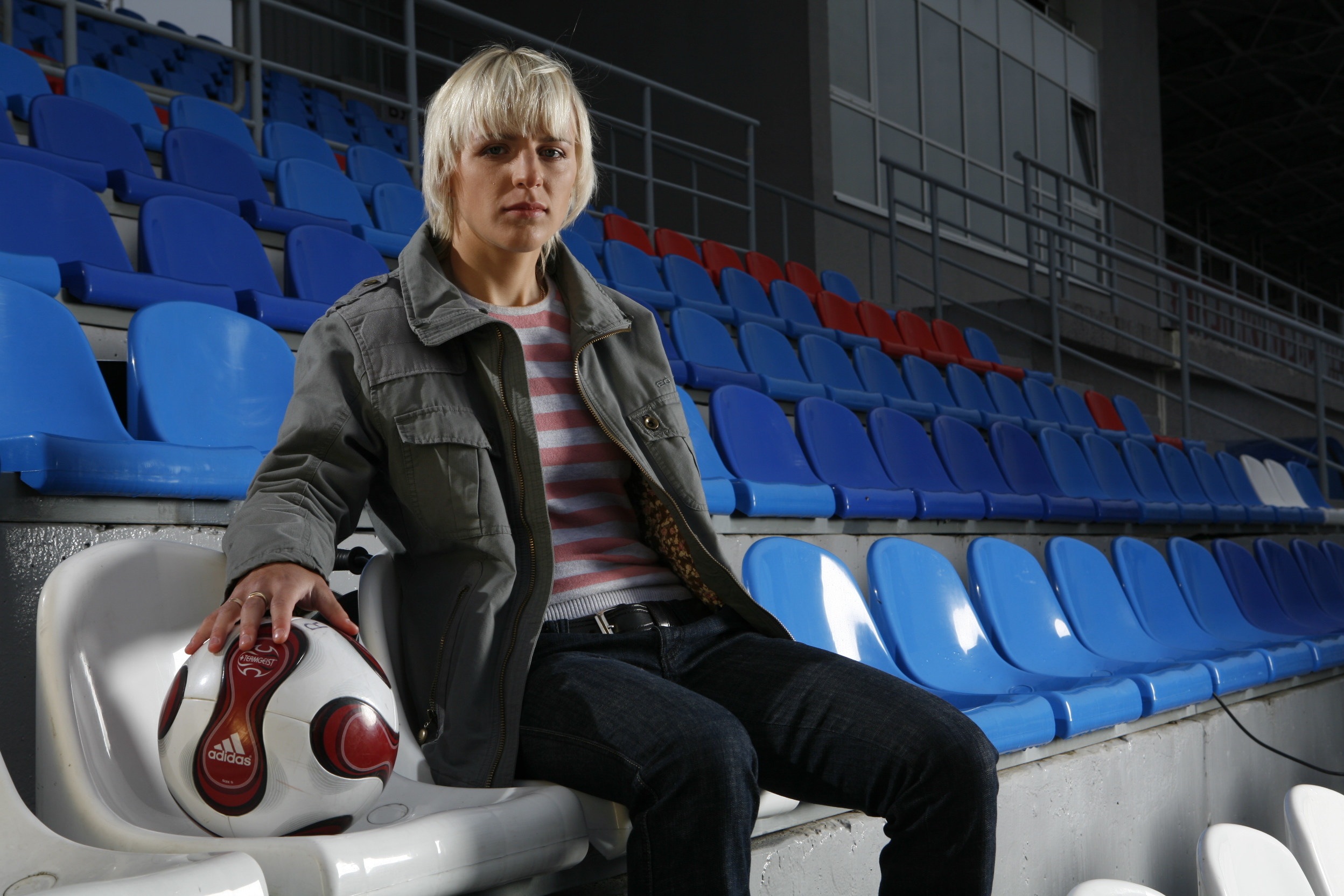

Personal information
- Full name: Elena Igorevna Morozova
- Date of birth: 15 March 1987 (age 39)
- Place of birth: Ivanovo, Soviet Union
- Height: 1.74 m (5 ft 9 in)
- Position: Midfielder

Team information
- Current team: Ryazan VDV
- Number: 23

Senior career*
Years	Team	Apps	(Gls)
2002–2003	Energiya Voronezh		
2004	Rossiyanka		
2005	Ryazan VDV		
2006–2012	Rossiyanka		
2012–2014	Zorky Krasnogorsk	55	(23)
2015–2016	Rossiyanka	17	(4)
2017	Kubanochka	14	(1)
2018–	Ryazan VDV	14	(1)

International career^{‡}
2003–2006	Russia U19	29	(9)
2005–2018	Russia	100	(23)
- * Club domestic league appearances and goals as of 25 July 2018 ‡ National team caps and goals as of 6 December 2018

Elena Igorevna Morozova (Russian: Елена Игоревна Морозова) is a Russian football midfielder, currently playing for Ryazan VDV in the Russian Championship. She previously played for Energiya Voronezh, WFC Rossiyanka, Zorky Krasnogorsk and Kubanochka Krasnodar.

Morozova started her career in 2002, at Voronezh. In 2004, she became a member of the Russian national team, and later took part in the 2009 European Championship, where she started against England and Italy. As an Under-19 international she won the 2005 U-19 Euro, as a part of the Russian national side. As of 2018, she has won 7 Russian Leagues, and 4 Russian Cups.

Morozova made her international debut with Russia against Ireland on 7 September 2005. Later on, she made her 100th and last international appearance against Wales on 6 December 2018.

== Titles ==
- 2005 Under-19 European Championship
- 7 Russian Leagues (2002, 2003, 2006, 2010, 2012, 2013, 2016)
- 4 Russian Cups (2006, 2008, 2009, 2010)

== International career ==
Goals scored for the Russian WNT in official competitions
Competition	Stage	Date	Location	Opponent	Goals	Result	Overall
2007 FIFA World Cup	Qualifiers	2005–08–28	Moscow	Scotland	1	6–0	4
2007 FIFA World Cup	Qualifiers	2005–09–01	Zug	Switzerland	1	2–1	4
2007 FIFA World Cup	Qualifiers	2006–05–24	Perth	Scotland	1	4–0	4
2007 FIFA World Cup	Qualifiers	2006–09–23	Moscow	Switzerland	1	2–0	4
2009 UEFA Euro	Qualifiers	2007–06–16	Krasnoarmeysk	Poland	1	3–1	1
2011 FIFA World Cup	Qualifiers	2009–10–25	Krasnoarmeysk	Republic of Ireland	1	3–0	1
2013 UEFA Euro	Qualifiers	2011–09–21	Racibórz	Poland	1	2–0 ^{1}	6
2013 UEFA Euro	Qualifiers	2012–03–31	Podolsk	North Macedonia	3	8–0	6
2013 UEFA Euro	Qualifiers	2012–06–21	Sarajevo	Bosnia and Herzegovina	1	1–0	6
2013 UEFA Euro	First Stage	2013–07–12	Norrköping	France	1	1–3	6
2015 FIFA World Cup	Qualifiers	2013–10–31	Senec	Slovakia	1	2–0	2
2015 FIFA World Cup	Qualifiers	2014–08–21	Samara	Slovakia	1	3–1	2
2019 FIFA World Cup	Qualifiers	2018–04–05	Zenica	Bosnia and Herzegovina	1	6–1	1

^{1} The scoreline was subsequently changed for a 3–0 default win.
