= Natalia Shlyapina =

Russian footballer (born 1983)

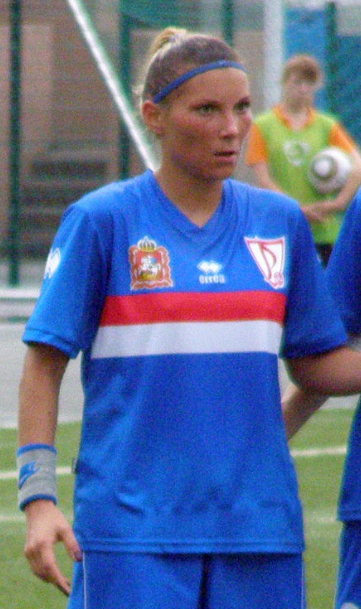

Personal information
- Full name: Natalia Shlyapina
- Birth name: Natalia Mokshanova
- Date of birth: 13 July 1983 (age 43)
- Place of birth: Soviet Union
- Position: Striker

Senior career*
Years	Team	Apps	(Gls)
- Nika Moscow
2000–2003	Snezhana Lyubertsy		
2003–2004	Chertanovo Moscow		
2004	Aurora Saint Petersburg		
2005–2014	WFC Rossiyanka		
2015	FC Torpedo Moscow		

International career^{‡}
2004–2013	Russia	55	(23)
- * Club domestic league appearances and goals ‡ National team caps and goals as of 17:47, 15 July 2013 (UTC)

Natalia Shlyapina (née Mokshanova; born 13 July 1983) is a former Russian football forward, who played for Rossiyanka in the Russian Championship. Before signing for Rossiyanka in 2005 she was a mini football and futsal player.

She is a member of the Russian national team.

== Titles ==
- Three Russian leagues (2005, 2006, 2010)
- Five Russian Cups (2005, 2006, 2008, 2009, 2010)
