= WFC Rossiyanka =

Russian women's association football club

- Full name: WFC Rossiyanka
- Founded: 2003; 23 years ago
- Dissolved: 2017; 9 years ago
- Ground: Rodina Stadium
- Capacity: 5 083
- Chairman: Oleg Shlyapin
- Manager: Georgy Shebarshin
- League: Russian Championship
- 2016: Champions
- Website: www.fc-ross.ru
Home colours	Away colours

WFC Rossiyanka was a Russian women's football club from Khimki.

== History ==
The team was founded in 1990 as Nadezhda Krasnoarmeysk, being initially a futsal club. Futsal was played until 1998, when the club left it to concentrate in association football. Nadezhda played for two years in the second tier, attaining 5th and 3rd spots, before being disbanded at the end of the 2000 season, with most players moving to newly founded Nadezhda Noginsk.

In 2003 the team was back as Rossiyanka, attaining promotion to the Russian Championship in the first try. Rossiyanka won the 2005 and 2006 championships, preceded by a silver in its 2004 debut. From 2007 to 2009 the team was second to Zvezda Perm, before winning its third championship in 2010. Rossiyanka successfully defended the title in the following season, which ended in 2012 following a short-lived change in the calendar format.

After four seasons with no titles, Rossiyanka won its fifth championship in 2016. The following year most of its squad moved to CSKA Moscow and Rossiyanka was merged into CSKA following the end of the 2017 season. The vacant in the championship was filled by Lokomotiv Moscow.

Rossiyanka was a regular of the Champions League, where it has reached the quarter-finals in 2008 and 2012. As Russia ranks among the top 8 UEFA Leagues by coefficient, Rossiyanka entered the competition both as the Russian Championship's champion or vice-champion.

== Titles ==
=== Official ===
- 5 Russian Leagues: 2005, 2006, 2010, 2011–12, 2016
- 5 Russian Cups: 2005, 2006, 2008, 2009, 2010

=== Invitational ===
- 2 Albena Cups: 2005, 2006

== Record in UEFA competitions ==
Season	Competition	Stage	Result	Opponent
2006–07	UEFA Women's Cup	Qualifying Stage	5–2	(Kazakhstan) Alma KTZh
2006–07	UEFA Women's Cup	Qualifying Stage	7–0	(Romania) Clujana
2006–07	UEFA Women's Cup	Qualifying Stage	6–1	(Slovakia) Slovan Duslo Šaľa
2006–07	UEFA Women's Cup	Group Stage	4–5	(England) Arsenal
2006–07	UEFA Women's Cup	Group Stage	1–2	(Denmark) Brøndby
2006–07	UEFA Women's Cup	Group Stage	4–2	(Hungary) Femina Budapest
2007–08	UEFA Women's Cup	Qualifying Stage	7–0	(Serbia) Napredak Kruševac
2007–08	UEFA Women's Cup	Qualifying Stage	18–0	(Georgia (country)) Dinamo Tbilisi
2007–08	UEFA Women's Cup	Qualifying Stage	3–0	(Ukraine) Arsenal Kharkiv
2007–08	UEFA Women's Cup	Group Stage	3–1	(Belarus) Universitet Vitebsk
2007–08	UEFA Women's Cup	Group Stage	2–1	(Romania) Clujana
2007–08	UEFA Women's Cup	Group Stage	2–2	(Sweden) Umeå
2007–08	UEFA Women's Cup	Quarter-finals	0–0, 1–2	(Germany) Frankfurt
2009–10	Champions League	Qualifying Stage	11–0	(Republic of Ireland) St. Francis
2009–10	Champions League	Qualifying Stage	1–0	(Cyprus) Apollon Limassol
2009–10	Champions League	Qualifying Stage	7–0	(Israel) Maccabi Holon
2009–10	Champions League	Round of 32	3–1, 2–1	(Spain) Rayo Vallecano
2009–10	Champions League	Round of 16	0–1, 1–1	(Sweden) Umeå
2010–11	Champions League	Qualifying Stage	5–0	(Croatia) Osijek
2010–11	Champions League	Qualifying Stage	9–0	(Republic of Ireland) St. Francis
2010–11	Champions League	Qualifying Stage	4–1	(Portugal) 1º Dezembro
2010–11	Champions League	Round of 32	3–1, 4–0	(Ukraine) Lehenda Chernihiv
2010–11	Champions League	Round of 16	1–6, 0–5	(France) Lyon
2011–12	Champions League	Round of 32	2–0, 1–0	(Netherlands) Twente
2011–12	Champions League	Round of 16	4–0, 3–3	(Russia) Energiya Voronezh
2011–12	Champions League	Quarter-finals	0–2, 0–3	(Germany) Turbine Potsdam
2012–13	Champions League	Round of 32	4–1, 1–2	(Netherlands) Den Haag
2012–13	Champions League	Round of 16	1–0, 2–2	(Czech Republic) Sparta Praha
2012–13	Champions League	Quarter-finals	1–2, 0–2	(Germany) Wolfsburg
2013–14	Champions League	Round of 32	4–2, 1–1	(Serbia) Spartak Subotica
2013–14	Champions League	Round of 16	1–0, 0–2	(Italy) Torres
2016–17	Champions League	Round of 32	0–0, 2–1	(Bosnia and Herzegovina) SFK 2000
2016–17	Champions League	Round of 16	0–4, 0–4	(Germany) Bayern Munich

== Current squad ==
As of 6 October 2016 Note: Flags indicate national team as defined under FIFA eligibility rules; some limited exceptions apply. Players may hold more than one non-FIFA nationality.

No.	Pos.	Nation	Player
1	GK	RUS	Elvira Todua
3	DF	RUS	Anna Kozhnikova
7	DF	RUS	Ekaterina Dmitrenko
8	MF	UKR	Olha Boychenko
9	MF	RUS	Anna Cholovyaga
10	MF	RUS	Elena Terekhova
11	FW	RUS	Ekaterina Sochneva
14	FW	CIV	Josée Nahi
17	MF	RUS	Kseniya Kovalenko
21	GK	RUS	Yulia Grichenko

No.	Pos.	Nation	Player
22	DF	RUS	Natalia Pertseva
23	MF	RUS	Elena Morozova
29	GK	RUS	Anastasiya Ananyeva
57	FW	CMR	Gabrielle Onguéné
70	DF	RUS	Elvira Ziyastinova
80	DF	RUS	Karina Blynskaya
87	MF	RUS	Olesya Mashina
88	FW	CIV	Ines Nrehy
89	MF	ARM	Kristine Aleksanyan

=== Former international players ===
For details of current and former players, see Category:WFC Rossiyanka players.

- (United States) Yael Averbuch
- (Romania) Georgiana Birțoiu
- (Ukraine) Tetyana Chorna
- (South Korea) Park Eun-sun
- (Russia) Nadezhda Kharchenko
- (Brazil) Fabiana da Silva
- (Brazil) Cristiane de Souza
- (Brazil) Ester dos Santos
- (Sweden) Sofia Jacobsson
- (Canada) Christina Julien
- (South Africa) Nompumelelo Nyandeni
- (Brazil) Aline Pellegrino
- (Russia) Olga Petrova
- (Russia) Natalia Russkikh
- (Russia) Elena Schegaleva
- (Russia) Natalia Shlyapina
- (Russia) Tatyana Skotnikova
- (Ukraine) Oksana Yakovyshyn
- (Ukraine) Iryna Zvarych

== See also ==
WFC CSKA
