= FC Zorky Krasnogorsk (women) =

Zorky
- Full name: FC Zorky Krasnogorsk
- Founded: 2006; 20 years ago
- Dissolved: 2015; 11 years ago
- Ground: Stadion Zorkij, Krasnogorsk
- Chairman: Andrea Grizzo
- Manager: Evgenii Nikolaev
- League: Russian Championship
- 2012–13: 1st
- Website: http://жфк-зоркий.рф/
Home colours	Away colours

FC Zorky Krasnogorsk was a Russian women's football team from Krasnogorsk founded in 2006, competing in the Russian Championship. In 2012 it reached the national cup's final, lost to Zvezda Perm.

In its first top division season the team reached the runners-up spot in the league and thus qualified to the 2012–13 UEFA Women's Champions League.

== History ==
The team entered competition on the third level of Russian women's football, the Second Division in 2008, and finished the season on fifth place. In 2009 they won that league by winning the division play-offs. In their initial First Division season in 2010 the team finished runners-up in the Western zone and then won play-off group B and then finally the final with a 1–0 win against Chertanovo Moskva. They played the national top division in 2011–12 and secured a second-place position on the very last matchday, despite trailing Voroneh 13 points before the last ten games. The second position qualified them for the 2012–13 UEFA Women's Champions League, where they defeated Iceland's Stjarnan in the round of 32 on met defending champions Lyon in the round of 16.

== Current squad ==
As of 7 October 2015 Note: Flags indicate national team as defined under FIFA eligibility rules; some limited exceptions apply. Players may hold more than one non-FIFA nationality.

No.	Pos.	Nation	Player
1	GK	RUS	Maria Zhamanakova
3	DF	RUS	Ekaterina Morozova
4	DF	RUS	Nadezhda Koltakova
5	DF	RUS	Elena Medved
7	DF	RUS	Kristina Mashkova
9	MF	RUS	Svetana Tonkikh
10	MF	RUS	Oksana Yakovishyn
11	FW	RUS	Ekaterina Sochneva
14	MF	RUS	Tatiana Skotnikova
15	FW	RUS	Irina Chusikova
17	FW	RUS	Anna Kostina
18	FW	RUS	Marina Fedorova

No.	Pos.	Nation	Player
19	FW	RUS	Natalia Ploskonenko
20	FW	RUS	Nelli Korovkina
21	MF	RUS	Anastasia Rodionova
22	DF	UKR	Darya Kravets
23	DF	RUS	Lyubov Bukashkina
24	MF	RUS	Svetlana Tsydikova
26	DF	MDA	Anastasia Slonova
51	DF	RUS	Anastasia Kostyukova
81	GK	RUS	Margarita Shirokova
91	MF	RUS	Nadezhda Smirnova
95	DF	RUS	Irina Podshibyakina
99	MF	RUS	Arina Kolesnikova

== Honors ==
For a detailed international record see Russian women's football clubs in international competitions

- Russian Leagues champion: 2012–13
- Russian Cup runners-up: 2012
