= Nadezhda Noginsk =

- Full name: FK Nadezhda Noginsk
- Founded: 2001
- Dissolved: 2008
- Ground: Stadion Avtomovilist, Noginsk
- League: Football Championship
- 2008: 5th
Home colours	Away colours

Nadezhda Noginsk was a Russian women's football from Noginsk, founded in 2001.

It competed for seven years in the top division before it was disbanded following the end of the 2008 season. Nadezhda was third in 2005, 2006 and 2007 and reached the national Cup semifinals twice.
