= UEFA Women's Euro 2009 =

Jalkapallon naisten Euroopan-mestaruuskilpailut 2009 Europamästerskapet i fotboll för damer 2009
- UEFA Women's Euro 2009 official logo

Tournament details
- Host country: Finland
- Dates: 23 August – 10 September
- Teams: 12
- Venues: 5 (in 4 host cities)

Final positions
- Champions: Germany (7th title)
- Runners-up: England

Tournament statistics
- Matches played: 25
- Goals scored: 75 (3 per match)
- Attendance: 134,907 (5,396 per match)
- Top scorer: (Germany) Inka Grings (6 goals)
- Best player: (Germany) Inka Grings

The 2009 UEFA Women's Championship, often known as the 2009 Women's Euros or just the 2009 Euros, was played in Finland between 23 August and 10 September 2009. The host was appointed on 11 July 2006, in a UEFA Executive Committee meeting in Berlin and the Finnish proposal won over the Dutch proposal.

The UEFA Women's Championship is a regular tournament involving European national teams from countries affiliated to UEFA, the European governing body, who have qualified for the competition. The competition aims to determine which national women's team is the best in Europe.

The 2009 tournament was won by Germany for a fifth straight and record-extending seventh time in total. They beat England, appearing in their first final since 1984, 6–2 in the final. The Germans also boasted the tournament's leading goalscorer in Inka Grings.

Iceland, Netherlands and Ukraine made their debut.

== Format ==
Twelve teams competed in the competition, an increase of 4 teams from 8 teams that played in previous tournaments. After a preliminary round, 30 teams competed in a qualifying group stage. Those teams were divided into six groups of five, with teams playing each other on a home-and-away basis. The six group winners advanced to the final tournament. The six runners-up and the four best third-placed teams played a qualification playoff. Those 11 teams and the hosts completed the 12-team lineup for the competition.

== Qualification ==
45 teams competed for the eleven available places in the final tournament; the qualifying teams together with the host were:

Country	Qualified as	Qualified on	Previous appearances in tournament^{1}
Finland	Host	11 July 2006	1 (2005)
England	Group 1 winner	2 October 2008	5 (1984, 1987, 1995, 2001, 2005)
Sweden	Group 2 winner	1 October 2008	7 (**1984**, 1987, 1989, 1995, 1997, 2001, 2005)
France	Group 3 winner	27 September 2008	3 (1997, 2001, 2005)
Germany	Group 4 winner	1 October 2008	7 (**1989**, **1991**, 1993, **1995**, **1997**, **2001**, **2005**)
Denmark	Group 5 winner	1 October 2008	6 (1984, 1991, 1993, 1997, 2001, 2005)
Norway	Group 6 winner	2 October 2008	8 (**1987**, 1989, 1991, **1993**, 1995, 1997, 2001, 2005)
Italy	Play-off winner	29 October 2008	8 (1984, 1987, 1989, 1991, 1993, 1997, 2001, 2005)
Russia	Play-off winner	30 October 2008	2 (1997, 2001)
Ukraine	Play-off winner	30 October 2008	0 (debut)
Iceland	Play-off winner	30 October 2008	0 (debut)
Netherlands	Play-off winner	30 October 2008	0 (debut)

^{1} Bold indicates champion for that year. Italic indicates host for that year

== Venues ==
The tournament was played in four cities in Finland: Helsinki, Turku, Tampere and Lahti.

Helsinki		Turku	Tampere	Lahti
Helsinki Olympic Stadium; Capacity: 40,000	Finnair Stadium; Capacity: 10,770	Veritas Stadion; Capacity: 9,000	Ratina Stadion; Capacity: 17,000	Lahden Stadion; Capacity: 14,465
4 Group matches Final	3 Group matches 1 Quarter-final; 1 Semi-final	4 Group matches 1 Quarter-final	4 Group matches 1 Quarter-final; 1 Semi-final	3 Group matches 1 Quarter-final

== Tournament review ==
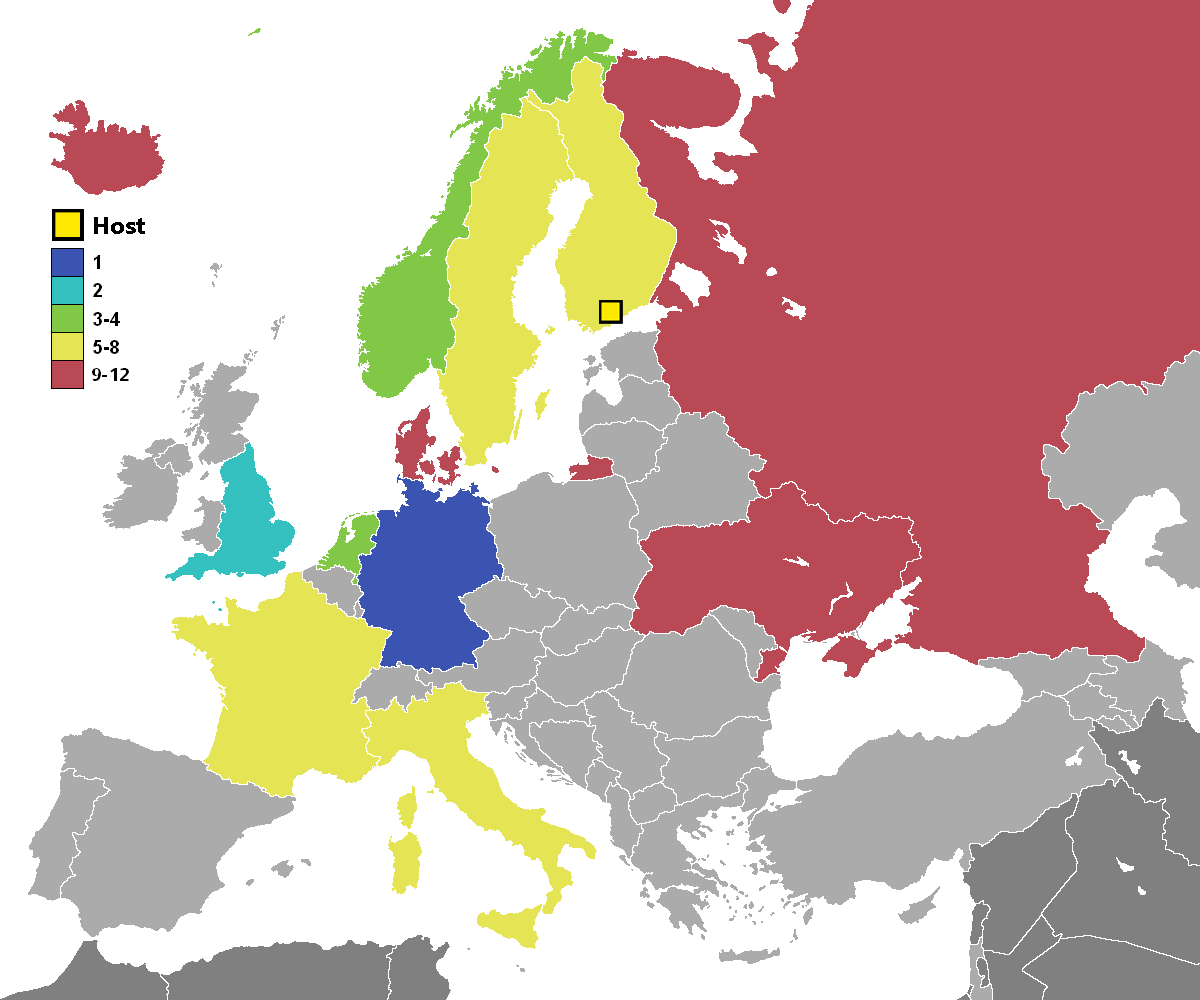
Participating teams

=== Matchday 1 – 23–25 August ===
In the opening round of Group A matches, Finland and the Netherlands showed that they would be contenders for qualification beyond the group stage. In the opening match of the tournament goals from Kirsten van de Ven and Karin Stevens would give the Dutch women a 2–0 victory over Ukraine. The evening fixture in the Olympic Stadium in Helsinki saw the host nation Finland begin their campaign with a 1–0 victory over Denmark. Maija Saari scored the first goal of the campaign, her first international goal.

In Group B defending World and European Champions Germany set the marker, dispatching fellow contenders Norway 4–0. The champions and favourites to defend their title stuttered early on as they took a 1–0 lead, but in stoppage time three more goals helped the Germans to their victory and their lead in Group B. In the other match in Group B, France began their campaign with a win, recovering from a goal down to beat Iceland 3–1.

Group C opened with a surprise, World Cup quarter-finalists England beaten 2–1 by Group C outsiders Italy. England led 1–0 thanks to a Williams penalty just before half-time; however, goals from Panico and Tuttino gave Italy the victory. England finished the game with ten women after Casey Stoney was dismissed. In Group C's other match 2003 World Cup finalists Sweden opened their challenge with a comfortable 3–0 win over Russia.

=== Matchday 2 – 26–28 August ===
Finland continued their good form in Group A, following up their 1–0 victory with a 2–1 win against the Netherlands. Kalmari scored twice as the home nation moved into the quarter-finals as winners of Group A with a match to spare. The win for Finland would prove to be the end for Ukraine. Earlier on the Ukrainian team had been beaten by Denmark 2–1, and a result of the Dutch and Danes' meeting in the next round of Group games could no longer qualify for the quarter-finals. Maiken Pape scored three minutes from time to devastate the debut nation.

Group B saw holders Germany progress after another victory, this time a 5–1 success against the French. Norway recovered from their opening defeat to edge past Iceland by a single goal, a result which eliminated the Icelandic team.

In Group C; Sweden booked their place in the last eight with a 2–0 win over Italy arguably the surprise package of the tournament so far. Two goals in the first twenty minutes killed the game for Sweden who now meet England in their final group match. Sweden's win in Turku meant that if England lost their match against Russia then their hopes would be over at the Group stage for the third successive Euro. Russia knowing a win would kickstart their campaign appeared certain to condemn the English to an exit as goals from Ksenia Tsybutovich and Olesya Kurochkina gave the Russians a 2–0 lead. However, that wasn't the end of the tale. England player Karen Carney reduced the gap and then just ten minutes later Carney dinked the ball through to Aluko who equalised for the England team. Two minutes before half-time Kelly Smith scored the fifth goal of the half and what proved to be the winner in a result which gives both sides a chance of qualifying.

=== Matchday 3 – 29–31 August ===
With both Ukraine and Finland knowing where they would finish in the Group, the hosts made four changes to their line up for the final group game. The Ukrainian side took advantage of the changes and signed off from their first UEFA Women's Euro with a 1–0 victory. With everything to play for in the other Group A match, The Netherlands with goals from Sylvia Smit and Manon Melis took a 2–0 lead over Denmark. Rasmussen reduced the arrears however the Dutch would hold on to take second place and leave Denmark relying on results from Group B and Group C to now progress to the quarter-finals.

In Group B; Germany through Inka Grings took top spot and the maximum nine points from three matches as they ended the Icelandic challenge with a 1–0 victory. Iceland, making their debut in the tournament showed renewed spirit but could not secure their first point in the European Championships. In the other game a 1–1 draw between Norway and France secured both teams their place in the quarter-finals.

The first round concluded on 31 August with the final games in Group C. Played simultaneously as are all final group matches. Italy secured their passage in the tournament with a 2–0 win over Russia, eliminating the Russians from the competition. Russia aware that a three-goal win would guarantee a place in the knock-out stages held out until 13 minutes from the end. In Group C's final game Sweden secured top spot in the group with a 1–1 draw against England, a result which saw the English side qualify. The result also eliminated Denmark in Group A as the side in third place with the worst record.

=== Quarter-finals – 3–4 September ===
In the opening quarter-final in Turku, Group A winner Finland took on second-best third-place and Group C qualifiers England. England, seeking to reach the last four following their early elimination in 2005 started well; Aluko giving them a 1–0 half-time lead. A Williams goal put England 2–0 up on 49 minutes and in total control. The home team rallied a goal from Sjölund recovering the deficit to 2–1 before Aluko put England 3–1 up and with one foot in the last four a minute later. A Sällström goal proved mere consolation for the Home nation who went out of the tournament 3–2.

In the second quarter-final held between the runners-up of Group A and Group B France took on Netherlands. In a tight match no goals would be scored in normal time or extra time forcing the first shootout of the tournament. After eight perfect penalties making the score 4–4, both teams missed their next two efforts as the tension continued to mount. However, the Dutch would prevail 5–4 to send out France, and book a date with England in the semi-finals.

In Friday's quarter-final matches, Germany took a 2–0 lead thanks to Two goals from Grings, making her top goalscorer in the tournament so far. Patriza Panico scored for Italy, and for a couple of moments it seemed that the holders may be in trouble. However, Germany soon regained control in possession and would win 2–1 to book their place in the semi-finals yet again.

In the final match of the round, Norway began to impress. Two goals in 7 minutes meant that the Norwegian women led 2–0 at half-time against a very strong and very impressive Swedish side. Cecile Pedersen's goal on the hour meant Norway led one of the favourites in Sweden 3–0. Even though Sandell Svensson scored for Sweden it would prove to be no more than consolation as Norway won 3–1 to secure a semi-final spot with Germany and a chance to avenge the 4–0 loss suffered against the Germans in their opening game.

=== Semi-finals – 6–7 September ===
In the opening semi-final England faced the Netherlands; Both teams having caused surprises to reach this stage of the tournament. England took the lead in the 61st minute with a goal from Kelly Smith. Marlous Pieëte levelled the scores at 1–1. The score at the end of 90 minutes was indeed that and extra-time started with the Dutch, who had advanced already via that method as favourite. However, with four minutes left and with Penalties looming Jill Scott scored the winner to send England into the final.

=== Final (England vs. Germany) – 10 September ===
England tried from the start to take the game to the favourites, Germany. But after missing several chances, England found themselves behind after 20 minutes of play when Germany scored in their very first attack (Birgit Prinz), and immediately scored a second—a long-range shot from Melanie Behringer to go 2–0 up. Two minutes later, England pulled one back (Karen Carney) and the game remained delicately balanced until half-time. The second half initially continued much the same as the first, with England generally attacking and Germany content to play a counter-attacking game. In the second half, Germany added a third (Kim Kulig) and England responded with their second (Kelly Smith), but when Grings scored Germany's fourth, England seemed to lose heart, and Germany were able to seal the win with a further two goals (Grings and Prinz getting their second goal each).

== Gallery ==
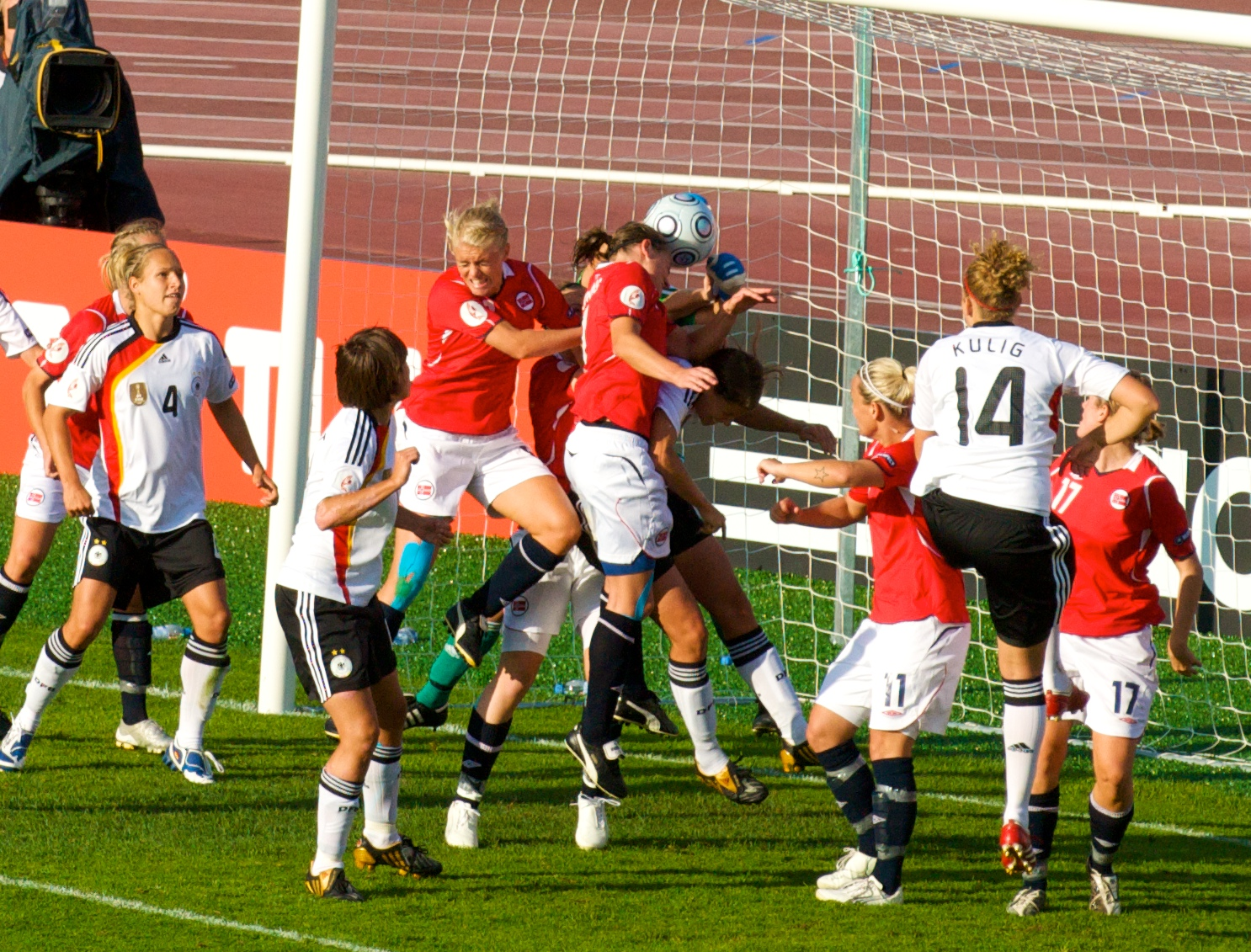
Germany playing Norway in Tampere, 24 August
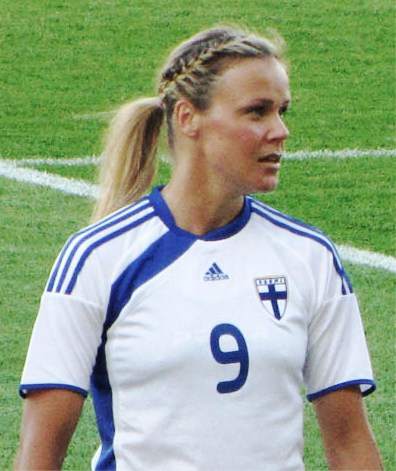
Laura Österberg Kalmari scored two goals for hosts Finland
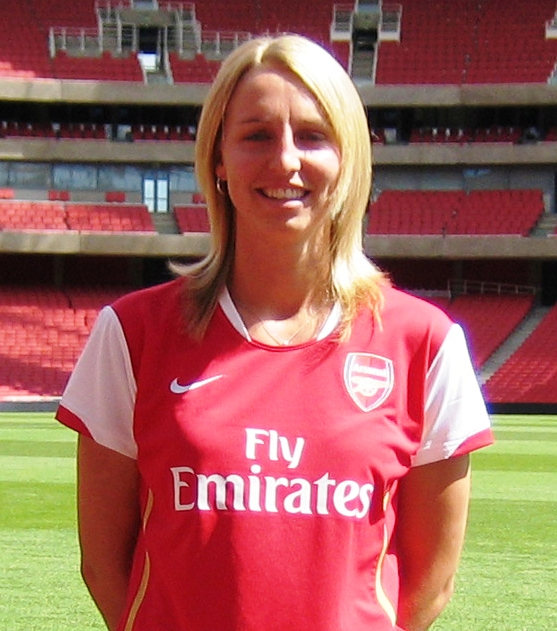
England's Faye White suffered a fracture in the quarter-final, but returned for the final

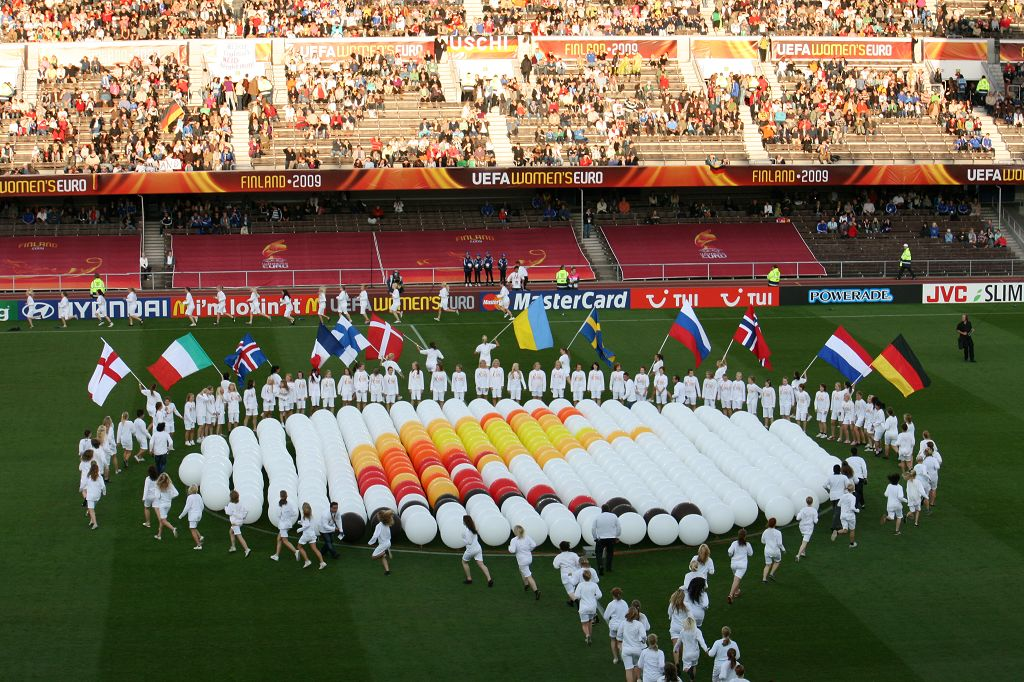
Women's Euro 2009 final (ceremony before the match)

== Results ==
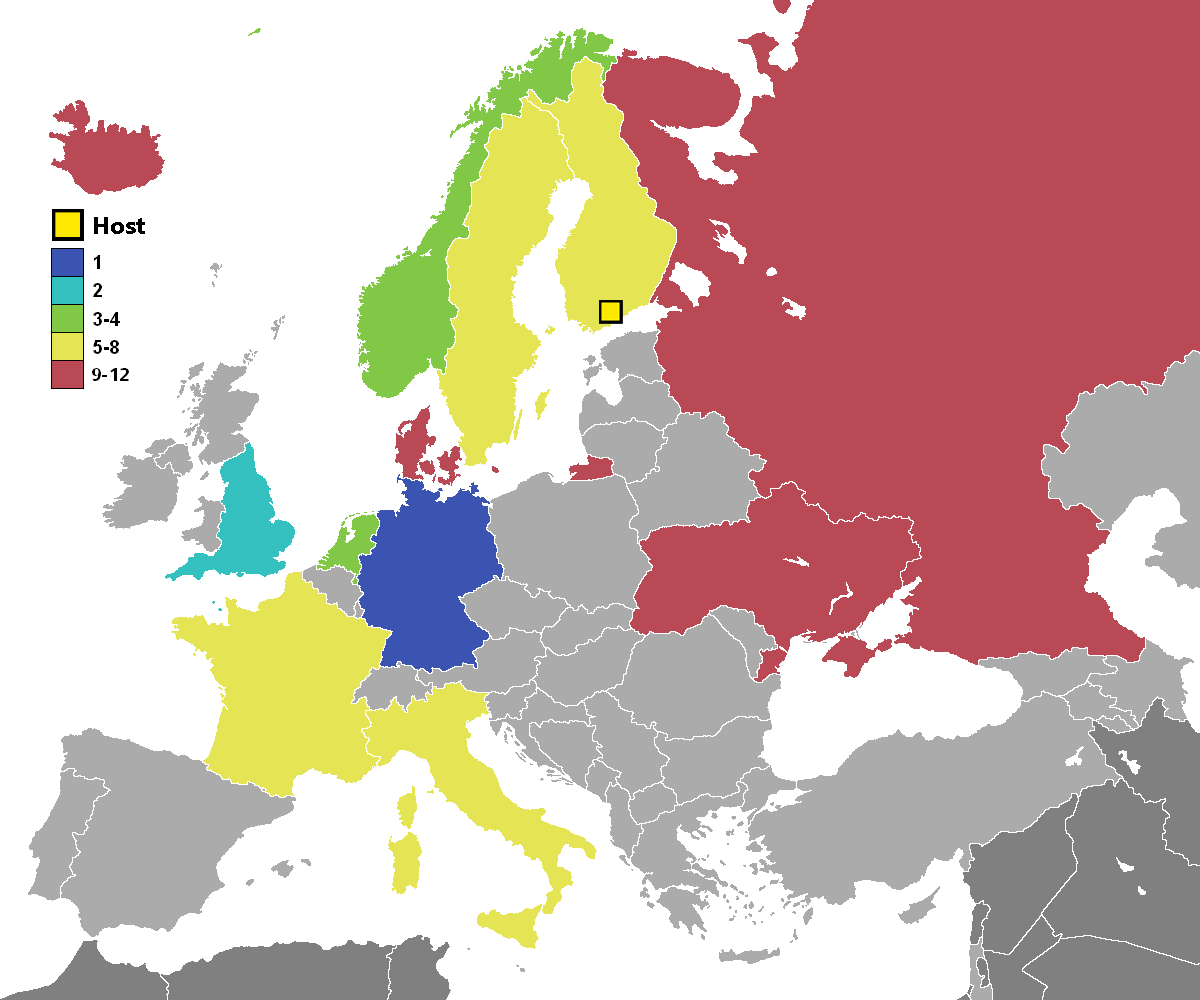
Participating teams and their result

All times local (EEST/UTC+3)

=== Group stage ===
The top two teams from each group progress to the quarter-finals along with the two best third-placed teams.

If two or more teams are level on points they are split by, in order of precedence: (a) higher number of points obtained in the matches played between the teams in question, (b) superior goal difference from the matches played between the teams in question (c) higher number of goals scored in the matches between the teams in question, (d) superior goal difference from all matches played, (e) higher number of goals scored, (f) Fair Play ranking (from during the tournament), (g) the drawing of lots.

==== Group A ====
Pos	Team	Pld	W	D	L	GF	GA	GD	Pts	Qualification
1	Finland	3	2	0	1	3	2	+1	6 (Note: Head-to-head result: Netherlands 1–2 Finland.)	Advance to knockout stage
2	Netherlands	3	2	0	1	5	3	+2	6	Advance to knockout stage
3	Denmark	3	1	0	2	3	4	−1	3 (Note: Head-to-head result: Ukraine 1–2 Denmark.)	
4	Ukraine	3	1	0	2	2	4	−2	3	

Source: UEFA.com
Notes:
23 August 2009
14:45

Ukraine	0–2	Netherlands
	Report	Van de Ven 4'; Stevens 9'

Veritas Stadion, Turku
Attendance: 2,571
Referee: Cristina Dorcioman (Romania)

23 August 2009
19:30

Finland	1–0	Denmark
Saari 49'	Report

Olympic Stadium, Helsinki
Attendance: 16,334
Referee: Dagmar Damková (Czech Republic)

26 August 2009
17:30

Ukraine	1–2	Denmark
Apanaschenko 63'	Report	Sand 49'; Pape 87'

Finnair Stadium, Helsinki
Attendance: 1,372
Referee: Gyöngyi Gaál (Hungary)

26 August 2009
20:00

Netherlands	1–2	Finland
Van de Ven 25'	Report	Kalmari 7', 69'

Olympic Stadium, Helsinki
Attendance: 16,148
Referee: Jenny Palmqvist (Sweden)

29 August 2009
17:30

Finland	0–1	Ukraine
	Report	Pekur 69'

Olympic Stadium, Helsinki
Attendance: 15,138
Referee: Natalia Avdonchenko (Russia)

29 August 2009
17:30

Denmark	1–2	Netherlands
J. Rasmussen 71'	Report	Smit 58'; Melis 66'

Lahden Stadion, Lahti
Attendance: 1,712
Referee: Jenny Palmqvist (Sweden)

==== Group B ====
Pos	Team	Pld	W	D	L	GF	GA	GD	Pts	Qualification
1	Germany	3	3	0	0	10	1	+9	9	Advance to knockout stage
2	France	3	1	1	1	5	7	−2	4	Advance to knockout stage
3	Norway	3	1	1	1	2	5	−3	4	Advance to knockout stage
4	Iceland	3	0	0	3	1	5	−4	0	

Source: UEFA.com
24 August 2009
17:00

Germany	4–0	Norway
Bresonik 33' (pen.); Bajramaj 90', 90+4'; Mittag 90+2'	Report

Ratina Stadion, Tampere
Attendance: 6,552
Referee: Alexandra Ihringova (England)

24 August 2009
20:00

Iceland	1–3	France
Magnúsdóttir 6'	Report	Abily 18' (pen.); Bompastor 53' (pen.); Nécib 67'

Ratina Stadion, Tampere
Attendance: 6,552
Referee: Natalia Avdonchenko (Russia)

27 August 2009
17:30

France	1–5	Germany
Thiney 51'	Report	Grings 9'; Krahn 17'; Behringer 45+1'; Bresonik 47' (pen.); Laudehr 90+1'

Ratina Stadion, Tampere
Attendance: 3,331
Referee: Kateryna Monzul (Ukraine)

27 August 2009
20:00

Iceland	0–1	Norway
	Report	Pedersen 45'

Lahden Stadion, Lahti
Attendance: 1,399
Referee: Cristina Dorcioman (Romania)

30 August 2009
16:00

Germany	1–0	Iceland
Grings 50'	Report

Ratina Stadion, Tampere
Attendance: 3,101
Referee: Kirsi Heikkinen (Finland)

30 August 2009
16:00

Norway	1–1	France
Storløkken 4'	Report	Abily 16'

Finnair Stadium, Helsinki
Attendance: 1,537
Referee: Alexandra Ihringova (England)

==== Group C ====
Pos	Team	Pld	W	D	L	GF	GA	GD	Pts	Qualification
1	Sweden	3	2	1	0	6	1	+5	7	Advance to knockout stage
2	Italy	3	2	0	1	4	3	+1	6	Advance to knockout stage
3	England	3	1	1	1	5	5	0	4	Advance to knockout stage
4	Russia	3	0	0	3	2	8	−6	0	

Source: UEFA.com
25 August 2009
17:30

Italy	2–1	England
Panico 56'; Tuttino 82'	Report	Williams 38' (pen.)

Lahden Stadion, Lahti
Attendance: 2,950
Referee: Bibiana Steinhaus (Germany)

25 August 2009
20:00

Sweden	3–0	Russia
Rohlin 5'; Sandell Svensson 15'; Seger 82'	Report; Report

Veritas Stadion, Turku
Attendance: 4,697
Referee: Kirsi Heikkinen (Finland)

28 August 2009
17:30

Italy	0–2	Sweden
	Report; Report	Schelin 9'; Asllani 19'

Veritas Stadion, Turku
Attendance: 5,947
Referee: Bibiana Steinhaus (Germany)

28 August 2009
20:00

England	3–2	Russia
Carney 24'; Aluko 32'; K. Smith 42'	Report	Tsybutovich 2'; Kurochkina 22'

Finnair Stadium, Helsinki
Attendance: 1,462
Referee: Dagmar Damková (Czech Republic)

31 August 2009
19:00

Russia	0–2	Italy
	Report	Gabbiadini 77'; Zorri 90+3'

Olympic Stadium, Helsinki
Attendance: 1,112
Referee: Gyöngyi Gaál (Hungary)

31 August 2009
19:00

Sweden	1–1	England
Sandell Svensson 40' (pen.)	Report; Report	White 28'

Veritas Stadion, Turku
Attendance: 6,142
Referee: Kateryna Monzul (Ukraine)

==== Third-placed qualifiers ====
At the end of the first stage, a comparison will be made between the third placed teams of each group. The two best third-placed teams advance to the quarter-finals.

Pos	Team	Pld	W	D	L	GF	GA	GD	Pts	Qualification
1	England	3	1	1	1	5	5	0	4	Advance to knockout stage
2	Norway	3	1	1	1	2	5	−3	4	Advance to knockout stage
3	Denmark	3	1	0	2	3	4	−1	3	

=== Knockout stage ===
Quarter-finals
3 September – Turku
Finland	2
England	3
3 September – Tampere
Netherlands (p)	0 (5)
France	0 (4)
4 September – Lahti
Germany	2
Italy	1
4 September – Helsinki
Sweden	1
Norway	3

Semi-finals
6 September – Tampere
England (a.e.t.)	2
Netherlands	1
7 September – Helsinki
Germany	3
Norway	1

Final
10 September – Helsinki
England	2
Germany	6

==== Quarter-finals ====
3 September 2009
16:00

Finland	2–3	England
Sjölund 66'; Sällström 79'	Report	Aluko 15', 67'; Williams 49'

Veritas Stadion, Turku
Attendance: 7,247
Referee: Dagmar Damková (Czech Republic)

3 September 2009
20:00

Netherlands	0–0 (a.e.t.)	France
	Report
Penalties
Stevens (penalty scored); Melis (penalty scored); Kiesel-Griffioen (penalty scored); Smit (penalty scored); Koster (penalty missed); Bito (penalty missed); Hoogendijk (penalty scored)	5–4	(penalty scored) Soubeyrand; (penalty scored) Abily; (penalty scored) Henry; (penalty scored) Le Sommer; (penalty missed) Franco; (penalty missed) Meilleroux; (penalty missed) Herbert

Ratina Stadion, Tampere
Attendance: 2,766
Referee: Kirsi Heikkinen (Finland)

4 September 2009
16:00

Germany	2–1	Italy
Grings 4', 47'	Report	Panico 63'

Lahden Stadion, Lahti
Attendance: 1,866
Referee: Jenny Palmqvist (Sweden)

4 September 2009
20:00

Sweden	1–3	Norway
Sandell Svensson 80'	Report; Report	Segerström 39' (o.g.); Giske 45'; Pedersen 60'

Finnair Stadium, Helsinki
Attendance: 1,708
Referee: Bibiana Steinhaus (Germany)

==== Semi-finals ====
6 September 2009
19:00

England	2–1 (a.e.t.)	Netherlands
K. Smith 61'; J. Scott 116'	Report	Pieëte 64'

Ratina Stadion, Tampere
Attendance: 4,621
Referee: Gyöngyi Gaál (Hungary)

7 September 2009
19:00

Germany	3–1	Norway
Laudehr 59'; Okoyino da Mbabi 61'; Bajramaj 90+3'	Report	Herlovsen 10'

Finnair Stadium, Helsinki
Attendance: 2,765
Referee: Kirsi Heikkinen (Finland)

==== Final ====
10 September 2009
19:00

England	2–6	Germany
Carney 24'; K. Smith 55'	Report	Prinz 20', 76'; Behringer 22'; Kulig 50'; Grings 62', 73'

Olympic Stadium, Helsinki
Attendance: 15,877
Referee: Dagmar Damková (Czech Republic)

== Goalscorers ==
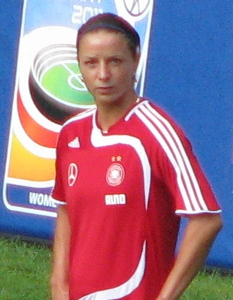
German striker Inka Grings was the tournament's top scorer

6 goals

- (Germany) Inka Grings

3 goals

- (England) Eniola Aluko
- (England) Kelly Smith
- (Germany) Fatmire Bajramaj
- (Sweden) Victoria Sandell Svensson

2 goals

- (England) Karen Carney
- (England) Fara Williams
- (Finland) Laura Österberg Kalmari
- (France) Camille Abily
- (Germany) Melanie Behringer
- (Germany) Linda Bresonik
- (Germany) Simone Laudehr
- (Germany) Birgit Prinz
- (Italy) Patrizia Panico
- (Netherlands) Kirsten van de Ven
- (Norway) Cecilie Pedersen

1 goal

- (Denmark) Camilla Sand Andersen
- (Denmark) Maiken Pape
- (Denmark) Johanna Rasmussen
- (England) Jill Scott
- (England) Faye White
- (Finland) Maija Saari
- (Finland) Linda Sällström
- (Finland) Annica Sjölund
- (France) Sonia Bompastor
- (France) Louisa Nécib
- (France) Gaëtane Thiney
- (Germany) Annike Krahn
- (Germany) Kim Kulig
- (Germany) Anja Mittag
- (Germany) Célia Okoyino da Mbabi
- (Iceland) Hólmfríður Magnúsdóttir
- (Italy) Melania Gabbiadini
- (Italy) Alessia Tuttino
- (Italy) Tatiana Zorri
- (Netherlands) Manon Melis
- (Netherlands) Marlous Pieëte
- (Netherlands) Sylvia Smit
- (Netherlands) Karin Stevens
- (Norway) Anneli Giske
- (Norway) Isabell Herlovsen
- (Norway) Lene Storløkken
- (Russia) Olesya Kurochkina
- (Russia) Ksenia Tsybutovich
- (Sweden) Kosovare Asllani
- (Sweden) Charlotte Rohlin
- (Sweden) Lotta Schelin
- (Sweden) Caroline Seger
- (Ukraine) Daryna Apanaschenko
- (Ukraine) Lyudmyla Pekur

own goals

- (Sweden) Stina Segerström (playing against Norway)

== See also ==
- UEFA Women's Championship
- UEFA
- Women's association football
