= Russian Women's Football Championship =

Russian Supreme Division Women
- Founded: 1992
- Country: Russia
- Confederation: UEFA
- Number of clubs: 12
- Level on pyramid: 1
- Relegation to: Women’s 1.Division
- Domestic cup: Russian Women's Cup
- Current champions: ZFK Zenit Saint Petersburg (4th Title) (2026)
- Most championships: Zvezda-2005 Perm (6 titles)
- Website: wfl.rfs.ru
- Current: 2026 Russian Women's Football Championship

The Russian Women's Football Championship (Russian: Чемпионат России по футболу среди женщин, romanized: Chempionat Rossii po futbolu sredi zhenshchin), also known as the Top Division and the Women's Football League, is the highest professional women's football league in Russia.

The Top Division was founded in 1992. Prior to the collapse of the Soviet Union, the women's league played two seasons in 1990 and 1991.

== Format ==
For the 2010 season the seven teams play each other four times, two times away and two games at home. In previous years the team played each other only twice. As Russia is in the top 8 leagues of Europe by UEFA Coefficient the top two teams qualify for the UEFA Women's Champions League and the last team gets relegated to the Women’s 1.Division. The 2011–12 season was the first to last over the winter month. Eight teams contest the season and play each other four times for a total of 28 matches. The tie-breaking rules after the season are in descending order: points, number of wins, then in matches between tied teams: points, wins, goal difference, goals scored, away goals scored, after that in all matches: goal difference, goals scored, away goal scored, better fair-play record and finally the tie is broken by drawing of a lot. One exception is, if there is a tie of points involving the first place, thus the tie-breaking would determine the champion. In this case, there is an additional match, or in case of at least a three way tie a tournament to be played.

In the 2012–13 season a championship and relegation round was played after the regular season. After 14 matches each, the top four and bottom four teams played each other twice more. The winner of the championship round is the champion.

In 2013 the league returned to the spring-autumn format. No championship group was played then. In 2014 a championship group followed the regular season. Points of both stages are added together.

== Teams in the 2022 season ==
Locations of the 2020 teams

| Team | Location | Ground |
|---|---|---|
| Chertanovo Moscow | Moscow | Arena Chertanovo |
| Dynamo Moscow | Moscow | VTB Arena |
| WFC Krasnodar | Krasnodar | Krasnodar Academy Stadium |
| CSKA Moscow | Moscow | Novye Khimki Stadium |
| Zenit Saint Petersburg | Saint Petersburg | Smena Stadium |
| Ryazan-VDV | Ryazan | Central'nyj Sportivn'yj Kompleks |
| Lokomotiv Moscow | Moscow | Sapsan Arena |
| Zvezda-2005 Perm | Perm | Zvezda Stadium |
| Yenisey Krasnoyarsk | Krasnoyarsk | Futbol-arena Enisey |

== Champions and top scorers ==
The champions so far are:

| # | Year | Champion | Runner-up | Third place | Top scorer |
|---|---|---|---|---|---|
| 1 | 1992 | Interros Moscow | CSK VVS Samara | SKIF Malakhovka | (Russia) Larisa Savina (CSK VVS Samara, 23 goals) |
| 2 | 1993 | CSK VVS Samara | Rus Moscow | SKIF Malakhovka | (Russia) Larisa Savina (CSK VVS Samara, 19 goals) |
| 3 | 1994 | CSK VVS Samara | Energiya Voronezh | Kaluzhanka | (Russia) Nadezhda Bosikova (Energiya Voronezh, 31 goals) |
| 4 | 1995 | Energiya Voronezh | CSK VVS Samara | Sibiryachka Krasnoyarsk | (Russia) Nadezhda Bosikova (Energiya Voronezh, 37 goals) |
| 5 | 1996 | CSK VVS Samara | Energiya Voronezh | Lada Togliatti | (Russia) Nadezhda Bosikova (Energiya Voronezh, 39 goals) |
| 6 | 1997 | Energiya Voronezh | CSK VVS Samara | VDV Ryazan | (Russia) Nadezhda Bosikova (Energiya Voronezh, 21 goals) |
| 7 | 1998 | Energiya Voronezh | CSK VVS Samara | VDV Ryazan | (Russia) Nadezhda Bosikova (Energiya Voronezh, 19 goals) |
| 8 | 1999 | VDV Ryazan | Energiya Voronezh | CSK VVS Samara | |
| 9 | 2000 | Ryazan TNK | Energiya XXI Vek Voronezh | CSK VVS Samara | (Russia) Nadezhda Bosikova (Energiya Voronezh, 30 goals) (Russia) Olga Letyushova (Ryazan-VDV, 30 goals) |
| 10 | 2001 | CSK VVS Samara | Energiya XXI Vek Voronezh | Ryazan TNK | (Russia) Olga Letyushova (Ryazan-VDV, 31 goals) |
| 11 | 2002 | Energiya Voronezh | Lada Togliatti | Ryazan TNK | (Russia) Natalia Barbashina (Lada Togliatti, 29 goals) |
| 12 | 2003 | Energiya Voronezh | Lada Togliatti | CSK VVS Samara | (Russia) Natalia Barbashina (Lada Togliatti, 21 goals) |
| 13 | 2004 | Lada Togliatti | Rossiyanka | Energiya Voronezh | (Russia) Olga Letyushova (Rossiyanka, 18 goals) |
| 14 | 2005 | Rossiyanka | Lada Togliatti | Nadezhda Noginsk | (Russia) Olga Letyushova (Rossiyanka, 27 goals) |
| 15 | 2006 | Rossiyanka | Spartak Moscow | Nadezhda Noginsk | (Russia) Olga Letyushova (Rossiyanka, 34 goals) |
| 16 | 2007 | Zvezda-2005 Perm | Rossiyanka | Nadezhda Noginsk | (Russia) Olga Letyushova (Zvezda-2005 Perm, 19 goals) |
| 17 | 2008 | Zvezda-2005 Perm | Rossiyanka | SKA Rostov | (Nigeria) Emueje Ogbiagbevha (Rossiyanka, 16 goals) |
| 18 | 2009 | Zvezda-2005 Perm | Rossiyanka | Energiya Voronezh | (Ukraine) Daryna Apanaschenko (Zvezda-2005 Perm, 12 goals) (Russia) Olesya Kurochkina (Zvezda-2005 Perm, 12 goals) |
| 19 | 2010 | Rossiyanka | Energiya Voronezh | Zvezda-2005 Perm | (Nigeria) Emueje Ogbiagbevha (Rossiyanka, 23 goals) |
| 20 | 2011–12 | Rossiyanka | Zorky Krasnogorsk | Energiya Voronezh | (Nigeria) Emueje Ogbiagbevha (Energiya Voronezh, 15 goals) |
| 21 | 2012–13 | Zorky Krasnogorsk | Rossiyanka | Ryazan-VDV | (Russia) Olesya Kurochkina (Izmailovo Moscow, 16 goals) |
| 22 | 2013 | Ryazan-VDV | Zvezda-2005 Perm | Zorky Krasnogorsk | (Russia) Elena Danilova (Ryazan-VDV, 17 goals) |
| 23 | 2014 | Zvezda-2005 Perm | Zorky Krasnogorsk | Ryazan-VDV | (Ukraine) Daryna Apanaschenko (Zvezda-2005 Perm, 8 goals) |
| 24 | 2015 | Zvezda-2005 Perm | Rossiyanka | Zorky Krasnogorsk | (Ukraine) Daryna Apanaschenko (Zvezda-2005 Perm, 13 goals) |
| 25 | 2016 | Rossiyanka | Zvezda-2005 Perm | Ryazan-VDV | (Russia) Margarita Chernomyrdina (Chertanovo Moscow, 8 goals) (Russia) Nadezhda Karpova (Chertanovo Moscow, 8 goals) |
| 26 | 2017 | Zvezda-2005 Perm | Ryazan-VDV | Chertanovo Moscow | (Russia) Elena Danilova (Ryazan-VDV, 11 goals) |
| 27 | 2018 | Ryazan-VDV | Chertanovo Moscow | Zvezda-2005 Perm | (Russia) Elena Danilova (Ryazan-VDV, 11 goals) |
| 28 | 2019 | CSKA Moscow | Lokomotiv Moscow | Kubanochka Krasnodar | (Russia) Nelli Korovkina (Lokomotiv Moscow, 20 goals) |
| 29 | 2020 | CSKA Moscow | Lokomotiv Moscow | Zvezda-2005 Perm | (Russia) Olesya Kurochkina (Zvezda-2005 Perm, 9 goals) |
| 30 | 2021 | Lokomotiv Moscow | CSKA Moscow | Zenit Saint Petersburg | (Russia) Nelli Korovkina (Lokomotiv Moscow, 20 goals) |
| 31 | 2022 | Zenit Saint Petersburg | CSKA Moscow | Lokomotiv Moscow | (Russia) Nelli Korovkina (Lokomotiv Moscow, 17 goals) |
| 32 | 2023 | Zenit Saint Petersburg | CSKA Moscow | Lokomotiv Moscow | (Portugal) Ana Dias (Zenit Saint Petersburg, 18 goals) |
| 33 | 2024 | Zenit Saint Petersburg | CSKA Moscow | Spartak Moscow | (Poland) Gabriela Grzywińska (Zenit Saint Petersburg, 19 goals) |
| 34 | 2025 | Spartak Moscow | CSKA Moscow | Zenit Saint Petersburg | (Serbia) Tijana Filipović (Spartak Moscow, 18 goals) |

=== Performance by club ===
| Club | Winners | Runners-up | Third place | Years won |
|---|---|---|---|---|
| Zvezda-2005 Perm | 6 | 2 | 3 | 2007, 2008, 2009, 2014, 2015, 2017 |
| Energiya Voronezh | 5 | 6 | 3 | 1995, 1997, 1998, 2002, 2003 |
| Rossiyanka | 5 | 6 | 0 | 2005, 2006, 2010, 2011–12, 2016 |
| CSK VVS Samara | 4 | 4 | 3 | 1993, 1994, 1996, 2001 |
| Ryazan-VDV | 4 | 1 | 7 | 1999, 2000, 2013, 2018 |
| Zenit Saint Petersburg | 3 | 0 | 1 | 2022, 2023, 2024 |
| CSKA Moscow | 2 | 4 | 0 | 2019, 2020 |
| Lada Togliatti | 1 | 3 | 1 | 2004 |
| Zorky Krasnogorsk | 1 | 2 | 2 | 2012–13 |
| Lokomotiv Moscow | 1 | 2 | 2 | 2021 |
| Spartak Moscow | 1 | 1 | 1 | 2025 |
| Interros Moscow | 1 | 0 | 0 | 1992 |
| Chertanovo Moscow / SKIF Malakhovka | 0 | 1 | 3 | |
| Rus Moscow | 0 | 1 | 0 | |
| Nadezhda Noginsk | 0 | 0 | 3 | |
| Kaluzhanka | 0 | 0 | 1 | |
| Sibiryachka Krasnoyarsk | 0 | 0 | 1 | |
| SKA Rostov | 0 | 0 | 1 | |
| Kubanochka Krasnodar | 0 | 0 | 1 | |

== See also ==
- Women's football in Russia
