= Montenegro women's national football team results =

Montenegrin women's team was founded in 2012. It is organised and headed by Football Association of Montenegro.
Montenegro played first official match on 13 March 2012 in Bar, against Bosnia and Herzegovina (2:3). Best competitive result, Montenegro made at 2013–14, when they qualified for the final round of 2015 FIFA Women's World Cup qualification (UEFA).

== List of matches ==
The following matches were played or are scheduled to be played by the national team in the current or upcoming seasons.

Win Draw Loss

| Date | Venue | Opponent | Result | Scorers | Competition |
|---|---|---|---|---|---|
| 13/03/2012 | Bar | Bosnia and Herzegovina | 2–3 | Malesija, Vukčević | Friendlies |
| 15/03/2012 | Podgorica | Bosnia and Herzegovina | 2–2 | Vukčević (2) | Friendlies |
| 15/05/2012 | Bar | Albania | 2-4 | Vukčević, Mujović | Friendlies |
| 18/05/2012 | Shkodra | Albania | 3-4 | Vukčević, Bulatović (2) | Friendlies |
| 04/04/2013 | Vilnius | Faroe Islands | 3–3 | Vukčević (2), Kuč | 2015 WC QS |
| 06/04/2013 | Vilnius | (Georgia (country)) Georgia | 2–0 | Vukčević (2) | 2015 WC QS |
| 09/04/2013 | Vilnius | Lithuania | 1–1 | Vukčević | 2015 WC QS |
| 26/10/2013 | Maladzyechna | Belarus | 1–3 | Krivokapić | 2015 WC QS |
| 31/10/2013 | Nikšić | Ukraine | 1–4 | Krivokapić | 2015 WC QS |
| 23/11/2013 | Nikšić | Wales | 0-3 | | 2015 WC QS |
| 28/11/2013 | İzmir | Turkey | 1–3 | Bulatović | 2015 WC QS |
| 05/04/2014 | Brighton and Hove | England | 0-9 | | 2015 WC QS |
| 10/04/2014 | Nikšić | Belarus | 1–7 | Vukčević | 2015 WC QS |
| 08/05/2014 | Bangor | Wales | 0–4 | | 2015 WC QS |
| 14/06/2014 | Lviv | Ukraine | 0-7 | | 2015 WC QS |
| 19/06/2014 | Petrovac | Turkey | 2-3 | Bulatović, Vukčević | 2015 WC QS |
| 17/09/2014 | Petrovac | England | 0-10 | | 2015 WC QS |
| 28/04/2015 | Skopje | (North Macedonia) Macedonia | 7–0 | Bulatović (3), Kuč (2), Đoković, Bojat | Friendlies |
| 29/04/2015 | Skopje | (North Macedonia) Macedonia | 7–1 | Kuč (5), Bojat (2) | Friendlies |
| 05/05/2015 | Petrovac | Albania | 1-0 | Kuč | Friendlies |
| 17/09/2015 | Turku | Finland | 0-1 | | 2017 EC QS |
| 27/11/2015 | Estoril | Portugal | 1–6 | Kuč | 2017 EC QS |
| 24/01/2016 | Petrovac | Spain | 0–7 | | 2017 EC QS |
| 07/04/2016 | Petrovac | Republic of Ireland | 0–5 | | 2017 EC QS |
| 12/04/2015 | Petrovac | Finland | 1–7 | Bulatović | 2017 EC QS |
| 03/06/2016 | Petrovac | Portugal | 0–3 | | 2017 EC QS |
| 07/06/2016 | Dublin | Republic of Ireland | 0–9 | | 2017 EC QS |
| 15/09/2016 | Las Rozas | Spain | 0–13 | | 2017 EC QS |
| 22/01/2017 | Petrovac | Croatia | 0–1 | | Friendlies |
| 24/01/2017 | Radanovići | Croatia | 3–3 | Šaranović, Bojat, Đukić | Friendlies |
| 28/02/2017 | Elbasan | Albania | 3–5 | Kuč, Bojat (2) | Friendlies |
| 06/04/2017 | Tórshavn | Turkey | 0–3 | | 2017 WC QS |
| 08/04/2017 | Tórshavn | Faroe Islands | 1-2 | Kuč | 2017 WC QS |
| 10/04/2017 | Tórshavn | Luxembourg | 7-1 | Bulatović (2), Kuč (2), Đoković (2), Pavićević | 2017 WC QS |
| 20/01/2018 | Podgorica | Bosnia and Herzegovina | 0–1 | | Friendlies |
| 06/06/2018 | Podgorica | Albania | 1-0 | Bulatović | Friendlies |
| 09/06/2018 | Podgorica | Albania | 2-2 | Stanović, Bulatović | Friendlies |
| 18/01/2019 | Podgorica | Bosnia and Herzegovina | 1–2 | Šebek | Friendlies |
| 21/01/2019 | Podgorica | Slovenia | 0–4 | | Friendlies |
| 26/01/2019 | Zagreb | Serbia | 0–4 | | Friendlies |
| 01/03/2019 | Zagreb | Bosnia and Herzegovina | 1–3 | Stanović | Friendlies |
| 04/03/2019 | Zagreb | Croatia | 1–1 | Stanović | Friendlies |
| 12/06/2019 | Zenica | Bosnia and Herzegovina | 0–0 | | Friendlies |
| 16/06/2019 | Dravograd | Slovenia | 0-5 | | Friendlies |
| 31/08/2019 | Kassel | Germany | 0-10 | | 2021 EC QS |
| 03/09/2019 | Dublin | Republic of Ireland | 0–2 | | 2021 EC QS |
| 06/11/2019 | Petrovac | Greece | 0–4 | | 2021 EC QS |
| 22/01/2020 | Podgorica | Bosnia and Herzegovina | 2–3 | Kuč, Tošković | Friendly |
| 11/03/2020 | Petrovac | Republic of Ireland | 0–3 | | 2021 EC QS |
| 18/09/2020 | Podgorica | Ukraine | 1–3 | Bulatović | 2021 EC QS |
| 22/09/2020 | Berane | Germany | 0–3 | | 2021 EC QS |
| 22/10/2020 | Athens | Greece | 0–1 | | 2021 EC QS |
| 01/12/2020 | Kyiv | Ukraine | 1–2 | Đoković | 2021 EC QS |
| 21/02/2021 | Podgorica | North Macedonia | 5–0 | Bulatović (2), Kuč (2), Vujadinović | Friendlies |
| 10/06/2021 | Ta' Qali | Malta | 2–1 | Bulatović, Kuč | Friendlies |
| 13/06/2021 | Ta' Qali | Malta | 0–1 | | Friendlies |
| 17/09/2021 | Zenica | Bosnia and Herzegovina | 3–2 | Kuč (2), Bulatović | 2023 WC QS |
| 21/10/2021 | Podgorica | Azerbaijan | 2–0 | Bulatović, Tošković | 2023 WC QS |
| 26/10/2021 | Podgorica | Denmark | 1–5 | Kuč | 2023 WC QS |
| 26/11/2021 | Ta' Qali | Malta | 2–0 | Kuč, Božić | 2023 WC QS |
| 30/11/2021 | Baku | Azerbaijan | 0–1 | | 2023 WC QS |
| 18/12/2021 | Bar | Bosnia and Herzegovina | 1–0 | Caković | Friendly |
| 12/04/2022 | Podgorica | Bosnia and Herzegovina | 0–2 | Caković | 2023 WC QS |
| 22/06/2022 | Vienna | Austria | 0–4 | | Friendly |
| 01/09/2022 | Viborg | Denmark | 1–5 | Vujadinović | 2023 WC QS |
| 06/09/2022 | Podgorica | Malta | 0–2 | | 2023 WC QS |
| 10/11/2022 | Bar | Estonia | 1–1 | Popović | Friendlies |
| 10/11/2022 | Bar | Estonia | 1–2 | Dešić | Friendlies |
| 15/02/2023 | Podgorica | Moldova | 6–1 | Kuč (2), Caković (2), Bulatović, Vujadinović | Friendlies |
| 18/02/2023 | Podgorica | Moldova | 2–0 | Bulatović (2) | Friendlies |
| 10/04/2023 | Podgorica | North Macedonia | 3–1 | Đoković, Karličić, Vujadinović | Friendlies |
| 14/07/2023 | Chișinău | Moldova | 1–2 | Dešić | Friendlies |
| 17/07/2023 | Chișinău | Moldova | 5–0 | Dešić, Tošković, Kuč, Božić, Đoković | Friendlies |
| 22/09/2023 | Tórshavn | Faroe Islands | 1–0 | Kuč | 2023–24 UEFA Nations League |
| 26/09/2023 | Podgorica | Azerbaijan | 0–1 | Kuč | 2023–24 UEFA Nations League |
| 27/10/2023 | Dasaki Achnas | Cyprus | 2–0 | Kuč, Šaranović | 2023–24 UEFA Nations League |
| 31/10/2023 | Baku | Azerbaijan | 0–3 | | 2023–24 UEFA Nations League |
| 01/12/2023 | Podgorica | Faroe Islands | 9–0 | Kuč (2), Bulatović (2), Đoković (2), Vujadinović (2), Christiansen (og) | 2023–24 UEFA Nations League |
| 05/12/2023 | Podgorica | Cyprus | 2–0 | Bulatović, Kuč | 2023–24 UEFA Nations League |
| 23/02/2024 | Podgorica | Northern Ireland | 0–2 | | 2023–24 UEFA Nations League |
| 27/02/2024 | Belfast | Northern Ireland | 1–1 | Dešić | 2023–24 UEFA Nations League |
| 05/04/2024 | Podgorica | Andorra | 6–1 | Bulatović 2, Đoković, Dešić 2, Božić | UEFA Women's Euro 2025 qualifying |
| 09/04/2024 | Podgorica | Faroe Islands | 5–1 | Tomašević, Kuč 2, Đoković, Dešić | UEFA Women's Euro 2025 qualifying |
| 31/05/2024 | Heraklion | Greece | 2–2 | Kuč, Bulatović | UEFA Women's Euro 2025 qualifying |
| 04/06/2024 | Andorra la Vella | Andorra | 5–1 | Kuč 2, Dešić, Đoković, Bulatović | UEFA Women's Euro 2025 qualifying |
| 12/06/2024 | Tórshavn | Faroe Islands | 1–2 | Kuč | UEFA Women's Euro 2025 qualifying |
| 16/06/2024 | Podgorica | Greece | 2–3 | Bulatović 2 | UEFA Women's Euro 2025 qualifying |
| 25/10/2024 | Podgorica | Finland | 0–1 | | UEFA Women's Euro 2025 qualifying |
| 29/10/2024 | Tampere | Finland | 0–5 | | UEFA Women's Euro 2025 qualifying |
| 30/11/2024 | Skopje | North Macedonia | 2–3 | Karličić, Petrović | Friendlies |
| 03/12/2024 | Skopje | North Macedonia | 5–1 | Đurđevac, Kuč, Đoković 2, Simonović | Friendlies |
| 21/02/2025 | Baku | Azerbaijan | 0–0 | | 2025–26 Nations League |
| 21/02/2025 | Nikšić | Lithuania | 3–1 | Kuč 3 | 2025–26 Nations League |
| 08/04/2025 | Nikšić | Azerbaijan | 1–1 | Đoković | 2025–26 Nations League |
| 3/06/2025 | Druskininkai | Lithuania | 1–0 | Dešić | 2025–26 Nations League |
| 24/10/2025 | Zmijavci | Croatia | 3–1 | Kuč, Tomašević, Dešić | Friendlies |
| 27/10/2025 | Dugopolje | Croatia | 1–2 | Karličić | Friendlies |
| 28/11/2025 | Podgorica | Romania | 1–0 | Dokovic | Friendlies |
| 03/03/2026 | Nikšić | Albania | 1–2 | Kuč | 2027 FIFA Women's World Cup qualification |
| 07/03/2026 | Llanelli | Wales | 1–6 | Kuč | 2027 FIFA Women's World Cup qualification |

== Head-to-head record ==
Below is a list of performances of Montenegro women's national football team against every single opponent.

| Opponents' country | G | W | D | L | GD |
|---|---|---|---|---|---|
| Albania | 7 | 2 | 1 | 7 | 13:17 |
| Andorra | 2 | 2 | 0 | 0 | 11:2 |
| Austria | 1 | 0 | 0 | 1 | 0:4 |
| Azerbaijan | 6 | 1 | 2 | 3 | 3:6 |
| Belarus | 2 | 0 | 0 | 2 | 2:10 |
| Bosnia and Herzegovina | 10 | 2 | 2 | 6 | 12:18 |
| Croatia | 5 | 1 | 2 | 2 | 8:8 |
| Cyprus | 2 | 2 | 0 | 0 | 4:0 |
| Denmark | 2 | 0 | 0 | 2 | 2:10 |
| England | 2 | 0 | 0 | 2 | 0:19 |
| Estonia | 2 | 0 | 1 | 1 | 2:3 |
| Faroe Islands | 6 | 3 | 1 | 2 | 20:8 |
| Finland | 4 | 0 | 0 | 4 | 1:14 |
| Georgia | 1 | 1 | 0 | 0 | 2:0 |
| Germany | 2 | 0 | 0 | 2 | 0:13 |
| Greece | 4 | 0 | 1 | 3 | 4:10 |
| Lithuania | 3 | 2 | 1 | 0 | 5:2 |
| Luxembourg | 1 | 1 | 0 | 0 | 7:1 |
| Malta | 4 | 2 | 0 | 2 | 4:4 |
| Moldova | 4 | 3 | 0 | 1 | 14:3 |
| Northern Ireland | 2 | 0 | 1 | 1 | 1:3 |
| North Macedonia | 4 | 3 | 0 | 1 | 15:5 |
| Portugal | 2 | 0 | 0 | 2 | 1:9 |
| Republic of Ireland | 4 | 0 | 0 | 4 | 0:19 |
| Romania | 1 | 1 | 0 | 0 | 1:0 |
| Serbia | 1 | 0 | 0 | 1 | 0:4 |
| Slovenia | 2 | 0 | 0 | 2 | 0:9 |
| Spain | 2 | 0 | 0 | 2 | 0:20 |
| Turkey | 3 | 0 | 0 | 3 | 3:9 |
| Ukraine | 4 | 0 | 0 | 4 | 3:16 |
| Wales | 3 | 0 | 0 | 3 | 1:13 |
| OVERALL | 98 | 26 | 12 | 60 | 139:240 |

Last update: 9 April 2026.

== See also ==
- Montenegro women's national football team
- Montenegrin Women's League
- Montenegrin Cup (women)
- Football Association of Montenegro
- Football in Montenegro
