= 2019 Istria Cup =

Friendly association football tournament played in Croatia

Tournament details
- Host country: Croatia
- Dates: February 26 – March 4
- Teams: 6 (from 1 confederation)
- Venue(s): 2 (in 2 host cities)

Final positions
- Champions: Slovenia (1st title)

Tournament statistics
- Matches played: 9
- Goals scored: 23 (2.56 per match)
- Top scorer(s): (Ukraine) Daryna Apanashchenko (Ukraine) Veronika Andrukhiv (3 goals)

The 2019 Istria Cup was the 7th edition of Istria Cup, a friendly women's association football tournament played in Croatia.

== Teams ==
Team	FIFA Rankings (7 December 2018)
Ukraine	24
Serbia	42
Croatia	51
Slovenia	55
Bosnia and Herzegovina	67
Montenegro	96

== Group stage ==
=== Group A ===
Team	Pld	W	D	L	GF	GA	GD	Pts
Slovenia	2	1	1	0	3	1	+2	4
Ukraine	2	1	0	1	5	3	+2	3
Croatia	2	0	1	1	0	4	−4	1

February 26, 2019
12:30

Croatia	0–4	Ukraine
	Report	Andrukhiv 3', 24', 85'; Apanashchenko 9'

Stadion NŠC Stjepan Spajić, Zagreb
February 28, 2019
12:30

Croatia	0–0	Slovenia
	Report

Stadion NŠC Stjepan Spajić, Zagreb
March 2, 2019
12:30

Ukraine	1–3	Slovenia
Apanashchenko 55' (pen.)	Report	Prašnikar 37'; Zver 57'; Čonč 69'

Stadion NŠC Stjepan Spajić, Zagreb

=== Group B ===
Team	Pld	W	D	L	GF	GA	GD	Pts
Serbia	2	2	0	0	6	0	+6	6
Bosnia and Herzegovina	2	1	0	1	3	3	0	3
Montenegro	2	0	0	2	1	7	−6	0

February 26, 2019
16:00

Serbia	4–0	Montenegro
Vuković 3'; Smiljković 23'; Bradić 32'; Slović 60'	Report

Igralište Lučkog, Zagreb
Referee: Sabina Bolić (Croatia)
February 28, 2019
16:00

Bosnia and Herzegovina	3–1	Montenegro
Medić 64'; Kamerić 78', 82'	Report	Stanović 43'

Igralište Lučkog, Zagreb
March 2, 2019
16:00

Bosnia and Herzegovina	0–2	Serbia
	Report	Vuković 48'; Filipović 90+1'

Igralište Lučkog, Zagreb

== Placement matches ==
Fifth place

March 4, 2019
12:00

Croatia	1–1	Montenegro
Božić 74' (o.g.)	Report	Stanović 50'
Penalties
	3–4

Igralište Lučkog, Zagreb
Referee: Tanja Račić (Croatia)

Third place

March 4, 2019
12:00

Bosnia and Herzegovina	0–1	Ukraine
	Report	Apanashchenko 44'

Igralište Lučkog, Zagreb

First place

March 4, 2019
16:00

Serbia	0–2	Slovenia
	Report	Mori 60'; Prašnikar 90+'

Igralište Lučkog, Zagreb

== Goalscorers ==
3 goals

- (Ukraine) Daryna Apanashchenko
- (Ukraine) Veronika Andrukhiv

2 goals

- (Bosnia and Herzegovina) Alma Kamerić
- (Montenegro) Nađa Stanović
- (Serbia) Marija Vuković
- (Slovenia) Lara Prašnikar

1 goal

- (Bosnia and Herzegovina) Merjema Medić
- (Serbia) Biljana Bradić
- (Serbia) Violeta Slović
- (Serbia) Tijana Filipović
- (Serbia) Miljana Smiljković
- (Slovenia) Dominika Čonč
- (Slovenia) Adrijana Mori
- (Slovenia) Mateja Zver

1 own goal

- (Montenegro) Helena Božić with Croatia.
