= Anastasija Krstović =

Montenegrin footballer

Personal information
- Date of birth: 21 July 2003 (age 23)
- Position: Goalkeeper

Team information
- Current team: Budućnost

Senior career*
Years	Team	Apps	(Gls)
2018-2021	Budućnost		
2022-2023	ŽFK Breznica		
2023-	Szent Mihalj		

International career^{‡}
2018–2019	Montenegro U17	8	(0)
2019–	Montenegro U19	10	(0)
2021–	Montenegro	35	(0)
- * Club domestic league appearances and goals ‡ National team caps and goals as of 15 August 2025

Anastasija Krstović (born 21 July 2003) is a Montenegrin footballer who plays as a goalkeeper for Women's League club ŽFK Budućnost and the Montenegro women's national team.

== Club career ==
Krstović has played for Budućnost in Montenegro.

== International career ==
Krstović made her senior debut for Montenegro on 21 February 2021.
