= Tatjana Đurković =

Montenegrin footballer

Personal information
- Full name: Tatjana Đurković
- Date of birth: 5 August 1996 (age 30)
- Place of birth: Montenegro, FR Yugoslavia
- Position: Defender

Team information
- Current team: Pyrgos AFC

Senior career*
Years	Team	Apps	(Gls)
2009–2014	Ekonomist		
2014–2015	Mladost		
2015–2017	Breznica		
2017–2021	Karyatides Spartis		
2021–2022	Aris Tripolis		
2022–2024	Asteras Tripolis	33	(4)
2024–2025	Kifisia		
2025–	Pyrgos		

International career^{‡}
2012	Montenegro U17	3	(0)
2013–14	Montenegro U19	6	(0)
2013–	Montenegro	58	(0)
- * Club domestic league appearances and goals as of 1 July 2024 ‡ National team caps and goals as of 16 August 2025

Tatjana Đurković (Serbian Cyrillic: Татјана Ђурковић; born 5 August 1996) is a Montenegrin football defender who plays for Pyrgos AFC in the Greek B Division and for the Montenegrin national team.

== Honours ==
Ekonomist

- Montenegrin League (4): 2010/11, 2011/12, 2012/13, 2013/14

Breznica

- Montenegrin League (2): 2015/16, 2016/17

Karyatides Spartis

- Greek B Division: 2019/20

Aris Tripolis

- Greek C Division: 2021/22

Asteras Tripolis

- Greek B Division: 2022/23
