= Andrea Janjušević =

Montenegrin footballer

Personal information
- Date of birth: 23 December 2003 (age 22)
- Position: Midfielder

Team information
- Current team: Partizán Bardejov

Senior career*
Years	Team	Apps	(Gls)
2022-2023	ŽFK Ekonomist		
2024-	Emina Mostar		

International career^{‡}
2021-	Montenegro	19	(0)
- * Club domestic league appearances and goals ‡ National team caps and goals as of 15 August 2025

Andrea Janjušević (born 23 December 2003) is a Montenegrin footballer who plays for Emina Mostar and the Montenegro women's national football team.

== Early life ==
Janjušević started playing football at the age of twelve.

== Club career ==
Janjušević played for Montenegrin side Ekonomist, where she was described as the "leader of the Nikšić team". She was the third top scorer of the 2021/22 Montenegrin Women's League with twenty-five goals.

== International career ==
She plays for the Montenegro women's national football team.

== Personal life ==
Janjušević has been nicknamed "Šećer".
