= Montenegrin women's clubs in European football competitions =

Since the season 2012-13, Montenegrin women's football clubs are playing in UEFA competitions. Until now, every season, one team from Montenegrin Women's League is participating in European football cups.

== List of matches ==
From 2012-13 season, champion of Montenegrin Women's League is playing in the UEFA Women's Champions League. In period 2012-2015, the only Montenegrin representative was ŽFK Ekonomist. From season 2016-17 to 2023-24, Montenegro was represented in UEFA Champions League by ŽFK Breznica.
Below is the list of Montenegrin clubs' matches in European competitions.

Season	Competition	Stage	Game	Result	Town
2012–13	Champions League	Qualifying Stage	(Belarus) Bobruichanka - (Montenegro) Ekonomist	5–1	Bratislava
2012–13	Champions League	Qualifying Stage	(Montenegro) Ekonomist - (Poland) Unia Racibórz	1–7	Bratislava
2012–13	Champions League	Qualifying Stage	(Slovakia) Slovan Bratislava - (Montenegro) Ekonomist	8–0	Bratislava
2013–14	Champions League	Qualifying Stage	(Montenegro) Ekonomist - (Faroe Islands) Klaksvík	1–1	Torres Novas
2013–14	Champions League	Qualifying Stage	(Switzerland) Zürich - (Montenegro) Ekonomist	4–1	Torres Novas
2013–14	Champions League	Qualifying Stage	(Portugal) Atlético Ouriense - (Montenegro) Ekonomist	1–1	Torres Novas
2014–15	Champions League	Qualifying Stage	(Montenegro) Ekonomist - (Slovenia) Pomurje	0–4	Petrovac
2014–15	Champions League	Qualifying Stage	(Hungary) MKT - (Montenegro) Ekonomist	1–0	Petrovac
2014–15	Champions League	Qualifying Stage	(Montenegro) Ekonomist - (Estonia) Pärnu JK	1–2	Petrovac
2015–16	Champions League	Qualifying Stage	(Slovenia) Pomurje - (Montenegro) Ekonomist	4–0	Beltinci
2015–16	Champions League	Qualifying Stage	(Montenegro) Ekonomist - (Romania) Olimpia Cluj	1–6	Beltinci
2015–16	Champions League	Qualifying Stage	(Estonia) Pärnu JK - (Montenegro) Ekonomist	2–1	Beltinci
2016–17	Champions League	Qualifying Stage	(Poland) Medyk Konin - (Montenegro) Breznica	9–0	Konin
2016–17	Champions League	Qualifying Stage	(Montenegro) Breznica - (Romania) Olimpia Cluj	0–10	Konin
2016–17	Champions League	Qualifying Stage	(Estonia) Pärnu JK - (Montenegro) Breznica	2-2	Konin
2017–18	Champions League	Qualifying Stage	(Montenegro) Breznica - (Norway) Avaldsnes IL	1–2	Podgorica
2017–18	Champions League	Qualifying Stage	(Montenegro) Breznica - (Serbia) Spartak Suborica	0–6	Podgorica
2017–18	Champions League	Qualifying Stage	(Montenegro) Breznica - (Israel) Kiryat Gat	2-2	Podgorica
2018–19	Champions League	Qualifying Stage	(Montenegro) Breznica - (Switzerland) Basel	0–4	Podgorica
2018–19	Champions League	Qualifying Stage	(Montenegro) Breznica - (Serbia) Spartak Suborica	0–4	Nikšić
2018–19	Champions League	Qualifying Stage	(Montenegro) Breznica - (Israel) Kiryat Gat	4-4	Podgorica
2019–20	Champions League	Qualifying Stage	(Montenegro) Breznica - (Bulgaria) NSA Sofia	4–4	Petrovac
2019–20	Champions League	Qualifying Stage	(Montenegro) Breznica - (Romania) Olimpia Cluj	3–2	Petrovac
2019–20	Champions League	Qualifying Stage	(Montenegro) Breznica - (Kosovo) Mitrovica	0-1	Nikšić
2020–21	Champions League	Qualifying Stage	(Slovenia) Pomurje - (Montenegro) Breznica	3–0	Gornja Radgona
2021–22	Champions League	Qualifying Stage	(Croatia) Osijek - (Montenegro) Breznica	5–0	Osijek
2021–22	Champions League	Qualifying Stage	(Armenia) Hayasa - (Montenegro) Breznica	2–3	Osijek
2022–23	Champions League	Qualifying Stage	(Montenegro) Breznica - (Slovakia) Spartak Myjava	2–3	Podgorica
2023–24	Champions League	Qualifying Stage	(Malta) Birkirkara - (Montenegro) Breznica	1–0	Valletta
2024–25	rowspan=2|[[UEFA Women's Champions League|Champions League]] || rowspan=2|Qualifying Stage || (Montenegro) [[ŽFK Breznica|Breznica]] - (Malta) Birkirkara	1–2	Birkirkara		
2024–25	(Montenegro) [[ŽFK Breznica|Breznica]] - (Serbia) [[ŽFK Crvena zvezda|Crvena Zvezda]] || 0–3	Birkirkara			

== Performances by clubs ==
During the overall history, two different Montenegrin clubs played in European women's football competitions. Below is a table with Montenegrin clubs' scores in UEFA competitions.

Team	Seasons	G	W	D	L	GD
ŽFK Breznica Pljevlja	9	19	2	4	13	22:69
ŽFK Ekonomist	4	12	0	2	10	8:45
OVERALL		31	2	6	23	30:114

As of the end of UEFA competitions 2024–25 season.

== Scores by opponents' countries ==
Below is the list of performances of Montenegrin clubs against opponents in UEFA competitions by their countries (football federations).

Opponents' country	G	W	D	L	GD
Armenia	1	1	0	0	3:2
Belarus	1	0	0	1	1:5
Bulgaria	1	0	1	0	4:4
Croatia	1	0	0	1	0:5
Estonia	3	0	1	2	4:6
Faroe Islands	1	0	1	0	1:1
Hungary	1	0	0	1	0:1
Israel	2	0	2	0	6:6
Kosovo	1	0	0	1	0:1
Norway	1	0	0	1	1:2
Malta	2	0	0	2	1:3
Poland	2	0	0	2	1:16
Portugal	1	0	1	0	1:1
Romania	3	1	0	2	4:18
Serbia	3	0	0	3	0:13
Slovakia	2	0	0	2	2:11
Slovenia	3	0	0	3	0:11
Switzerland	2	0	0	2	1:8
OVERALL	31	2	6	23	30:114

As of the end of UEFA competitions 2024–25 season.

== See also ==
- Football in Montenegro
- Montenegrin Women's League
- Montenegrin Cup (women)
