= Nađa Đurđevac =

Montenegrin footballer

Personal information
- Date of birth: 25 August 2002 (age 24)
- Position: Forward

Team information
- Current team: Budućnost Podgorica

Senior career*
Years	Team	Apps	(Gls)
2018-2020	Budućnost Podgorica		
2021-	ŽFK Breznica		

International career^{‡}
2017–2018	Montenegro U17	6	(1)
2019	Montenegro U19	2	(1)
2021–	Montenegro	15	(1)
- * Club domestic league appearances and goals ‡ National team caps and goals as of 15 August 2025

Nađa Đurđevac (born 25 August 2002) is a Montenegrin footballer who plays as a forward for Women's League club ŽFK Budućnost Podgorica and the Montenegro women's national team.

== Club career ==
Đurđevac has played for Budućnost Podgorica in Montenegro.

== International career ==
Đurđevac made her senior debut for Montenegro on 21 February 2021 as a 76th-minute substitution in a 5–0 friendly home win over North Macedonia.

== International goals ==
Scores and results list Montenegro's goal tally first.

No.	Date	Venue	Opponent	Score	Result	Competition
1.	3 December 2024	Petar Miloševski Training Centre, Skopje, North Macedonia	North Macedonia	1–0	5–1	Friendly
