= Milica Radunović =

Montenegrin association footballer

Personal information
- Date of birth: 9 November 1996 (age 30)
- Position: Defender

Team information
- Current team: ŽFK Budućnost Podgorica

Senior career*
Years	Team	Apps	(Gls)
2017-	ŽFK Budućnost Podgorica		

International career^{‡}
2012	Montenegro U17	1	(0)
2013–2014	Montenegro U19	2	(0)
2016–	Montenegro	28	(0)
- * Club domestic league appearances and goals ‡ National team caps and goals as of 16 August 2025

Milica Radunović (born 9 November 1996) is a Montenegrin footballer who plays as a defender for the Montenegro women's national team.

== International career ==
Radunović capped for Montenegro at senior level during the UEFA Women's Euro 2017 qualifying Group 2, in a 1–7 home loss to Finland on 12 April 2016.
