= Maja Šaranović =

Montenegrin footballer

Personal information
- Date of birth: 11 November 1999 (age 27)
- Position: Midfielder

Team information
- Current team: Partizán Bardejov

Senior career*
Years	Team	Apps	(Gls)
2015-2016	ŽFK Ekonomist		
2018-2019	ŽFK Breznica		
2019-2020	Partizán Bardejov		
2021-2022	ŽFK Breznica		
2022-2023	KFF Vllaznia		
2023-2024	TSC Kanjiža		
2024-	ŽFK Budućnost Podgorica		

International career^{‡}
2014-2015	Montenegro U17	6	(0)
2016-2017	Montenegro U19	6	(1)
2016-	Montenegro	56	(2)
- * Club domestic league appearances and goals ‡ National team caps and goals as of 15 August 2025

Maja Šaranović (Serbian Cyrillic: Маја Шарановић; born 11 November 1999) is a Montenegrin footballer who plays as a midfielder and has appeared for the Montenegro women's national team.

== Career ==
Šaranović has been capped for the Montenegro national team, appearing for the team during the 2019 FIFA Women's World Cup qualifying cycle.

== International goals ==
No.	Date	Venue	Opponent	Score	Result	Competition
1	27 October 2023	Dasaki Stadium, Dasaki Achnas, Cyprus	Cyprus	2–0	2–0	2023–24 UEFA Women's Nations League
