= Darija Đukić =

Montenegrin footballer (born 1996)

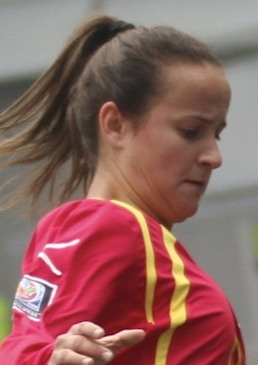
- Đukić in 2014

Personal information
- Date of birth: 11 January 1996 (age 30)
- Place of birth: Montenegro, FR Yugoslavia
- Position: Midfielder

Team information
- Current team: Fatih Vatan
- Number: 17

Senior career*
Years	Team	Apps	(Gls)
2012–2018	ŽFK Ekonomist		
2018–2019	Crvena Zvezda		
2019–2020	Partizán Bardejov	0	(0)
2022–2023	Minsk	15	(4)
2023	Crvena Zvezda		
2023	Gazikent		
2024	Marítimo		
2024–2025	ALG	20	(0)
2025–	Fatih Vatan	6	(0)

International career^{‡}
2012	Montenegro U17	3	(0)
2013–	Montenegro	70	(1)
- * Club domestic league appearances and goals as of 2 SNovember 2025 ‡ National team caps and goals as of 15 August 2025

Darija Đukić (Serbian Cyrillic: Дарија Ђукић; born 11 January 1996) is a Montenegrin women's football midfielder who plays in the Turkish Super League for Fatih Vatan, and has appeared for the Montenegro women's national team.

== Club career ==
Đukić played for Partizán Bardejov in Slovakia and for Minsk in Belarus.

In September 2024, she moved to Turkey, and signed with the Gaziantep-based club ALG to play in the Super League.

For the 2025–26 Turkish Super League season, she transferred to Fatih Vatan in Istanbul.

== International career ==
Đukić has been capped for the Montenegro national team, appearing for the team during the 2019 FIFA Women's World Cup qualifying cycle.
