= Anđela Tošković =

Montenegrin footballer

Personal information
- Date of birth: 19 August 2004 (age 22)
- Place of birth: Montenegro, Serbia and Montenegro
- Position: Midfielder

Team information
- Current team: Ankara BB Fomget
- Number: 23

Senior career*
| Years | Team | Apps | (Gls) |
| 2018-2020 | Budućnost | | (62) |
| 2021-2022 | ŽFK Breznica | | |
| 2024- | Crvena Zvezda | | |

International career^{‡}
| 2019– | Montenegro U17 | 3 | (0) |
| 2020– | Montenegro | 29 | (4) |
- * Club domestic league appearances and goals ‡ National team caps and goals as of 11 March 2020

Anđela Tošković (born 19 August 2004) is a Montenegrin footballer who plays as a midfielder for 1. ŽFL club ŽFK Crvena Zvezda and the Montenegro women's national team.

== International goals ==
| No. | Date | Venue | Opponent | Score | Result | Competition |
|---|---|---|---|---|---|---|
| 1. | 22 January 2020 | Camp FSCG, Podgorica, Montenegro | Bosnia and Herzegovina | 2–2 | 2–3 | Friendly |
| 2. | 21 October 2021 | Camp FSCG, Podgorica, Montenegro | Azerbaijan | 2–0 | 2–0 | 2023 FIFA Women's World Cup qualification |
| 3. | 14 July 2023 | Stadionul CPSM, Vadul lui Vodă, Moldova | Moldova | 5–0 | 5–0 | Friendly |
