= Dijana Miljanić =

Montenegrin footballer

Personal information
- Date of birth: 13 January 1997 (age 29)
- Position: Defender

Senior career*
Years	Team	Apps	(Gls)
- Ekonomist

International career^{‡}
2012–2013	Montenegro U17	6	(0)
2014–2015	Montenegro U19	4	(0)
2016	Montenegro	1	(0)
- * Club domestic league appearances and goals ‡ National team caps and goals as of 15 September 2016

Dijana Miljanić (born 13 January 1997) is a Montenegrin footballer who plays as a defender. She has been a member of the Montenegro women's national team.
