= Daryna Apanashchenko =

Ukrainian footballer (born 1986)

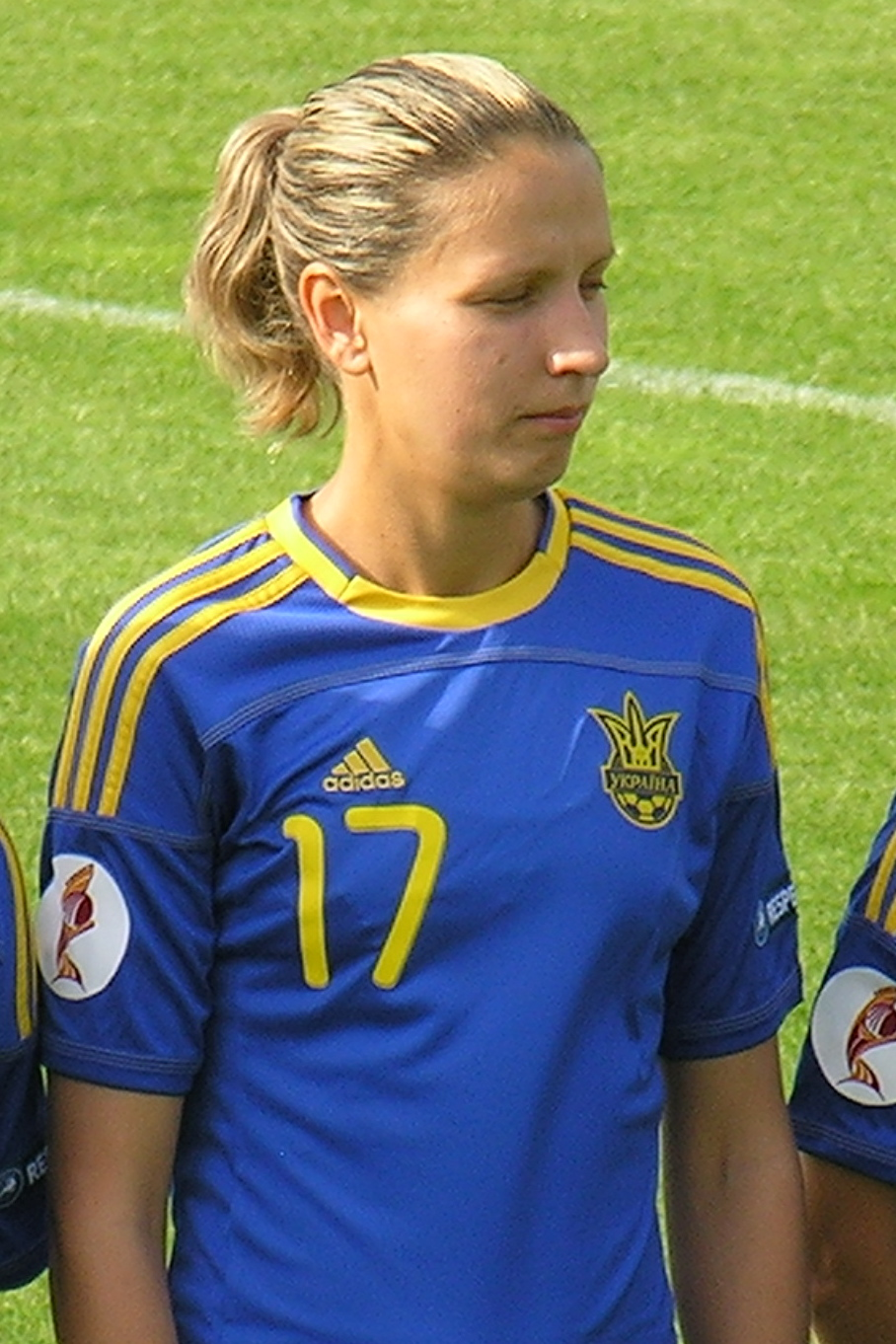
- in 2012

Personal information
- Full name: Daryna Apanaschenko
- Date of birth: 16 May 1986 (age 40)
- Place of birth: Kryvyi Rih, Ukrainian SSR, Soviet Union
- Height: 1.74 m (5 ft 9 in)
- Position: Forward

Team information
- Current team: Metalist 1925 Kharkiv

Senior career*
Years	Team	Apps	(Gls)
2001	Kyivska Rus Kyiv	6	(0)
2001–2003	Lehenda Chernihiv	31	(18)
2004	Energiya Voronezh		
2005–2008	Ryazan VDV		
2009–2017	Zvezda Perm	155	(68)
2017–2021	Zhytlobud-1	61	(48)
2022–2023	Ankara BB Fomget GS	??	(22)
2023–	Metalist 1925 / Zhytlobud-1	39	(9)

International career^{‡}
2002–	Ukraine	155	(67)
- * Club domestic league appearances and goals as of 11 July 2025 ‡ National team caps and goals as of 2 December 2024

Daryna Apanashchenko (Ukrainian: Дарина Олександрівна Апанащенко; born 16 May 1986) is a Ukrainian footballer, who plays as a striker for Metalist 1925 Kharkiv and the Ukraine women's national football team. For 14 years, she played in Russia for Russian Women's Football Championship teams Energiya Voronezh, Ryazan VDV, and Zvezda Perm.

== Club career ==
Apanashchenko started her career at the capital team Kyivska Rus when she was 15 years old in 2001. In a 2010 interview Apanashchenko stated that women's football was completely ignored in Ukraine at that time.

In the 2008–09 UEFA Women's Cup semi-final second leg at Umeå she scored two goals that sealed Zvezda's surprising qualification for the final. She also scored Zvezda's only goal in the two-legged final.

In 2016 Apanashchenko appeared on Myrotvorets for "deliberate violation of the State border of Ukraine in order to penetrate into the Crimea occupied by Russian invaders, participation in propaganda activities of Russia (the aggressor country) against Ukraine, participation in attempts to legalize the occupation of the Autonomous Republic of Crimea by Russian invaders".

In March 2022, she moved to Turkey and joined Ankara-based club Fomget FSK to play in the second half of the 2021-22 Women's Super League. She scored three goals in ten league matches of the 2021–22 season.

== International career ==
Apanashchenko earned her first cap for the Ukraine national team on 12 May 2002, coming on as a substitute on the 88th-minute in a 1–1 2003 FIFA Women's World Cup qualification (UEFA) draw with Norway in Boryspil.

She scored three goals in the qualifying stage for UEFA Women's Euro 2009, including winners against Denmark and Scotland, and contributed further to Ukraine's qualification for the tournament scoring three more goals in the play-off against Slovenia. In the final tournament she scored again against Denmark, but that time it was not enough to win the match. In 2013 she was appointed national team captain.

By June 2019 Apanashchenko had amassed over 100 international appearances and more than 50 goals. In April 2021, she scored in Ukraine's UEFA Women's Euro 2022 qualifying play-offs tie against Northern Ireland – her 61st goal in her 122nd appearance – but Ukraine were beaten 4–1 on aggregate.

== International goals ==
As of 8 April 2025

Scores and results list Ukraine's goal tally first.

No.	Date	Venue	Opponent	Score	Result	Competition
1.	8 June 2003	Stadion Avanhard, Lutsk, Ukraine	Czech Republic	1–0	1–1	UEFA Women's Euro 2005 qualifying
2.	29 March 2004	Stadion Avanhard, Uzhhorod, Ukraine	Poland	1–1	2–2	Friendly
3.	7 March 2005	Stadion Krymteplytsia, Ahrarne, Ukraine	Russia	1–2	1–2	Friendly
4.	5 November 2005	Stadion Lajkovac, Lajkovac, Serbia and Montenegro	Serbia and Montenegro	2–0	4–0	2007 FIFA Women's World Cup qualification
5.	9 May 2007	NTC Stadion, Senec, Slovakia	Slovakia	3–0	4–0	UEFA Women's Euro 2009 qualifying
6.	28 May 2008	McDiarmid Park, Perh, Scotland	Scotland	1–0	1–0	UEFA Women's Euro 2009 qualifying
8.	22 June 2008	Stadion imeni Haharyna, Chernihiv, Ukraine	Denmark	1–0	1–0	UEFA Women's Euro 2009 qualifying
9.	26 October 2008	Dravograd Sports Centre, Dravograd, Slovenia	Slovenia	1–0	3–0	UEFA Women's Euro 2009 qualifying
10.	26 October 2008	Dravograd Sports Centre, Dravograd, Slovenia	Slovenia	2–0	3–0	UEFA Women's Euro 2009 qualifying
11.	29 October 2008	Stadion imeni Haharyna, Chernihiv, Ukraine	Slovenia	1–0	2–0	UEFA Women's Euro 2009 qualifying
12.	26 August 2009	Finnair Stadium, Helsinki, Finland	Denmark	1–1	1–2	UEFA Women's Euro 2009
13.	25 October 2009	Stadion imeni Haharyna, Chernihiv, Ukraine	Bosnia and Herzegovina	2–0	7–0	2011 FIFA Women's World Cup qualification
14.	25 October 2009	Stadion imeni Haharyna, Chernihiv, Ukraine	Bosnia and Herzegovina	5–0	7–0	2011 FIFA Women's World Cup qualification
15.	20 May 2010	Stadion imeni Haharyna, Chernihiv, Ukraine	Hungary	1–0	4–2	2011 FIFA Women's World Cup qualification
16.	20 May 2010	Stadion imeni Haharyna, Chernihiv, Ukraine	Hungary	2–0	4–2	2011 FIFA Women's World Cup qualification
17.	19 June 2010	Bosnia and Herzegovina	Bosnia and Herzegovina	1–0	5–0	2011 FIFA Women's World Cup qualification
18.	19 June 2010	Bosnia and Herzegovina	Bosnia and Herzegovina	3–0	5–0	2011 FIFA Women's World Cup qualification
19.	21 August 2010	Stadion imeni Haharyna, Chernihiv, Ukraine	Romania	1–0	3–1	2011 FIFA Women's World Cup qualification
20.	21 August 2010	Stadion imeni Haharyna, Chernihiv, Ukraine	Romania	3–1	3–1	2011 FIFA Women's World Cup qualification
21.	25 August 2010	Stadion imeni Haharyna, Chernihiv, Ukraine	Poland	2–1	3–1	2011 FIFA Women's World Cup qualification
22.	25 August 2010	Stadion imeni Haharyna, Chernihiv, Ukraine	Poland	3–1	3–1	2011 FIFA Women's World Cup qualification
23.	18 May 2011	Russian Federation	Russia	1–1	2–2	Friendly
24.	18 September 2011	A. Le Coq Arena, Tallinn, Estonia	Estonia	2–0	4–1	UEFA Women's Euro 2013 qualifying
25.	18 September 2011	A. Le Coq Arena, Tallinn, Estonia	Estonia	3–0	4–1	UEFA Women's Euro 2013 qualifying
26.	5 April 2012	Sevastopol Sports Complex, Sevastopol, Ukraine	Estonia	1–0	5–0	UEFA Women's Euro 2013 qualifying
27.	5 April 2012	Sevastopol Sports Complex, Sevastopol, Ukraine	Estonia	2–0	5–0	UEFA Women's Euro 2013 qualifying
28.	5 April 2012	Sevastopol Sports Complex, Sevastopol, Ukraine	Estonia	5–0	5–0	UEFA Women's Euro 2013 qualifying
29.	23 May 2012	Hungary	Hungary	1–0	4–0	Friendly
30.	15 September 2012	Spartak Stadium, Mogilev, Belarus	Belarus	1–0	5–0	UEFA Women's Euro 2013 qualifying
31.	15 September 2012	Spartak Stadium, Mogilev, Belarus	Belarus	2–0	5–0	UEFA Women's Euro 2013 qualifying
32.	25 October 2012	Laugardalsvöllur, Reykjavík, Iceland	Iceland	2–2	2–3	UEFA Women's Euro 2013 qualifying
33.	14 June 2014	Arena Lviv, Lviv, Ukraine	Montenegro	4–0	7–0	2015 FIFA Women's World Cup qualification
34.	2 August 2014	Training Complex imeni Bannikova, Kyiv, Ukraine	Belarus	2–0	8–0	2015 FIFA Women's World Cup qualification
35.	20 August 2014	Traktor Stadium, Minsk, Belarus	Belarus	2–1	3–1	2015 FIFA Women's World Cup qualification
36.	25 October 2014	Stadio Centro d'Italia, Rieti, Italy	Italy	1–1	1–2	2015 FIFA Women's World Cup qualification – UEFA play-offs
37.	19 September 2015	Portugal	Portugal	1–0	1–1	Friendly
38.	21 September 2015	Portugal	Portugal	1–0	2–0	Friendly
39.	4 March 2016	Elbasan Arena, Elbasan, Albania	Albania	1–0	4–0	UEFA Women's Euro 2017 qualifying
40.	8 March 2016	Acharnes Stadium, Athens, Greece	Greece	1–0	3–1	UEFA Women's Euro 2017 qualifying
41.	8 April 2016	Arena Lviv, Lviv, Ukraine	Albania	1–0	2–0	UEFA Women's Euro 2017 qualifying
42.	8 April 2016	Arena Lviv, Lviv, Ukraine	Albania	2–0	2–0	UEFA Women's Euro 2017 qualifying
43.	7 June 2016	Arena Lviv, Lviv, Ukraine	Greece	1–0	2–0	UEFA Women's Euro 2017 qualifying
44.	15 September 2017	Arena Lviv, Lviv, Ukraine	Croatia	1–0	1–1	2019 FIFA Women's World Cup qualification
45.	24 November 2017	Balmazújvárosi Városi Sportpálya, Balmazújváros, Hungary	Hungary	1–0	1–0	2019 FIFA Women's World Cup qualification
46.	2 March 2018	Side, Turkey	Kosovo	1–0	2–0	2018 Turkish Women's Cup
47.	4 March 2018	Gold City Sports Complex, Alanya, Turkey	Northern Ireland	3–1	3–1	2018 Turkish Women's Cup
48.	12 June 2018	Arena Lviv, Lviv, Ukraine	Sweden	1–0	1–0	2019 FIFA Women's World Cup qualification
49.	4 September 2018	Ternopilsky Misky Stadion, Ternopil, Ukraine	Hungary	2–0	2–0	2019 FIFA Women's World Cup qualification
50.	9 November 2018	Gold City Sports Complex, Alanya, Turkey	Kosovo	1–0	4–1	Friendly
51.	12 November 2018		Kosovo	4–0	4–0	Friendly
52.	26 February 2019	Stadion NŠC Stjepan Spajić, Zagreb, Croatia	Croatia	2–0	4–0	2019 Istria Cup
53.	2 March 2019	Stadion NŠC Stjepan Spajić, Zagreb, Croatia	Slovenia	1–1	1–3	2019 Istria Cup
54.	4 March 2019	Igralište Lučkog, Zagreb, Croatia	Bosnia and Herzegovina	1–0	1–0	2019 Istria Cup
55.	11 November 2019		Turkey	2–0	4–0	Friendly
56.	7 March 2020	Pinatar Arena, San Pedro del Pinatar, Spain	Northern Ireland	2–0	4–0	2020 Pinatar Cup
57.	7 March 2020	Pinatar Arena, San Pedro del Pinatar, Spain	Northern Ireland	3–0	4–0	2020 Pinatar Cup
58.	18 September 2020	DG Arena, Podgorica, Montenegro	Montenegro	1–0	3–1	UEFA Women's Euro 2022 qualifying
59.	22 September 2020	Obolon Arena, Kyiv, Ukraine	Greece	4–0	4–0	UEFA Women's Euro 2022 qualifying
60.	23 February 2021	Gold City Sports Complex, Kargıcak, Turkey	India	2–2	3–2	2021 Turkish Women's Cup
61.	23 February 2021	Gold City Sports Complex, Kargıcak, Turkey	India	3–2	3–2	2021 Turkish Women's Cup
62.	9 April 2021	Stadion Kolos, Kovalivka, Ukraine	Northern Ireland	1–1	1–2	UEFA Women's Euro 2022 qualifying play-offs
63.	30 November 2021	Várkerti Stadion, Kisvárda, Hungary	Hungary	1–3	2–4	2023 FIFA Women's World Cup qualification
64.	19 February 2022	Gold City Sports Complex, Antalya, Turkey	Uzbekistan	2–0	2–0	2022 Turkish Women's Cup
65.	31 October 2023	Theodoros Vardinogiannis Stadium, Heraklion, Greece	Greece	1–0	1–0	2023–24 UEFA Women's Nations League
66.	12 July 2024	Fadil Vokrri Stadium, Pristina, Kosovo	Kosovo	1–0	4–0	UEFA Women's Euro 2025 qualifying
67.	29 October 2024	Stadionul Zimbru, Chișinău, Moldova	Turkey	1–0	1–1	UEFA Women's Euro 2025 qualifying play-offs

== Honours ==
Lehenda Chernihiv

- Ukrainian Women's League (2) 2001, 2002
- Women's Cup (2) 2001, 2002

Zvezda Perm

- Russian Women's Leagues (3) 2014, 2015, 2017
- Russian Women's Cup (4) 2012, 2013, 2015, 2016,

Zhytlobud-1 Kharkiv

- Russian Women's Cup (4) 2012 (1) 2018

Individual

- Russian Women's Leagues Top Scorer (3) 2009, 2014, 2015
- Ukrainian Woman Footballer of the Year: (6) 2009, 2010, 2015, 2016, 2017, 2018, 2019
- Ukrainian Women's League Footballer of the Year: 2018
