= Jelena Sturanović =

Montenegrin footballer

Personal information
- Date of birth: 7 March 1996 (age 30)
- Position: Forward

Senior career*
Years	Team	Apps	(Gls)
- Ekonomist
2015	Medyk Konin		

International career^{‡}
2012	Montenegro U17	3	(0)
2013–2014	Montenegro U19	6	(0)
2013–2015	Montenegro	11	(0)
- * Club domestic league appearances and goals ‡ National team caps and goals as of 17 September 2015

Jelena Sturanović (born 7 March 1996) is a Montenegrin footballer who plays as a forward. She has been a member of the Montenegro women's national team.
