= 2011–12 Montenegrin Women's League =

Montenegrin Women's League
- Season: 2011–12
- Dates: October 2011 - May 2012
- Champions: Ekonomist

The 2011–12 Montenegrin Women's League was the inaugural edition of the competition, which succeeded the FSCG Trophy as the premier women's football championship in Montenegro. It ran from 15 October 2011 to 12 May 2012 and it was contested by six teams. Ekonomist Nikšić won nine out of ten games to win the competition and become the first Montenegrin club to take part in the UEFA Champions League.

== Table ==
Pos	Team	Pld	W	D	L	GF	GA	GD	Pts	Qualification
1	Ekonomist	10	9	1	0	106	4	+102	28	Champions League
2	Budućnost	10	8	1	1	120	19	+101	25	
3	Pristan (Note: Pristan were deducted 1 point.)	10	5	0	5	57	39	+18	14	
4	Sport Uno	10	5	0	5	21	23	−2	15	
5	Durmitor (Note: Durmitor were deducted 1 point.)	10	2	0	8	20	107	−87	5	
6	Ribnica (Note: Ribnica were deducted 2 points.)	10	0	0	10	2	134	−132	−2	

Source: FSCG.me (page 76)

== See also ==
- Montenegrin Women's League
