= Ukrainian Woman Footballer of the Year =

Sporting award

The Ukrainian Woman Footballer of the Year (Ukrainian: найкращий гравець України) is an annual award given by the Ukrainian Women's League to the best professional Ukrainian female footballer since 2008. There are two awards available and the other is called Best Footballer of the Ukrainian Woman League (Ukrainian: найкращий гравець Чемпіонату України).

== Best Ukrainian Female Footballer ==
Year	Footballer	Club
2008	Nadiya Baranova	(Russia) Zvezda-2005 Perm
2009	Daryna Apanashchenko	(Russia) Zvezda-2005 Perm
2010	Daryna Apanashchenko	(Russia) Zvezda-2005 Perm
2011	Tetiana Chorna	(Russia) WFC Rossiyanka
2012	Iryna Zvarych	(Russia) WFC Rossiyanka
2013	Iryna Zvarych	(France) FCF Juvisy / (Denmark) Fortuna Hjørring
2014	Lyudmyla Pekur	(Russia) Ryazan-VDV
2015	Daryna Apanashchenko	(Russia) Zvezda-2005 Perm
2016	Daryna Apanashchenko	(Russia) Zvezda-2005 Perm
2017	Daryna Apanashchenko	(Ukraine) Zvezda-2005 Perm
2018	Daryna Apanashchenko	(Ukraine) WFC Zhytlobud-1 Kharkiv

=== Ukrainian Women's League ===
Year	Footballer	Club
2012	Olena Khodyreva	(Ukraine) WFC Naftokhimik Kalush
2013	Olha Ovdiychuk	(Ukraine) WFC Zhytlobud-1 Kharkiv
2014	Iryna Sanina	(Ukraine) WFC Zhytlobud-1 Kharkiv
2015	Olha Ovdiychuk	(Ukraine) WFC Zhytlobud-1 Kharkiv
2016	Olha Ovdiychuk	(Ukraine) WFC Zhytlobud-1 Kharkiv
2017	Olha Ovdiychuk	(Ukraine) WFC Zhytlobud-1 Kharkiv
2018	Daryna Apanashchenko	(Ukraine) WFC Zhytlobud-1 Kharkiv

== See also ==
- List of sports awards honoring women
- Soviet Footballer of the Year
