= Jovana Mrkić =

Montenegrin footballer

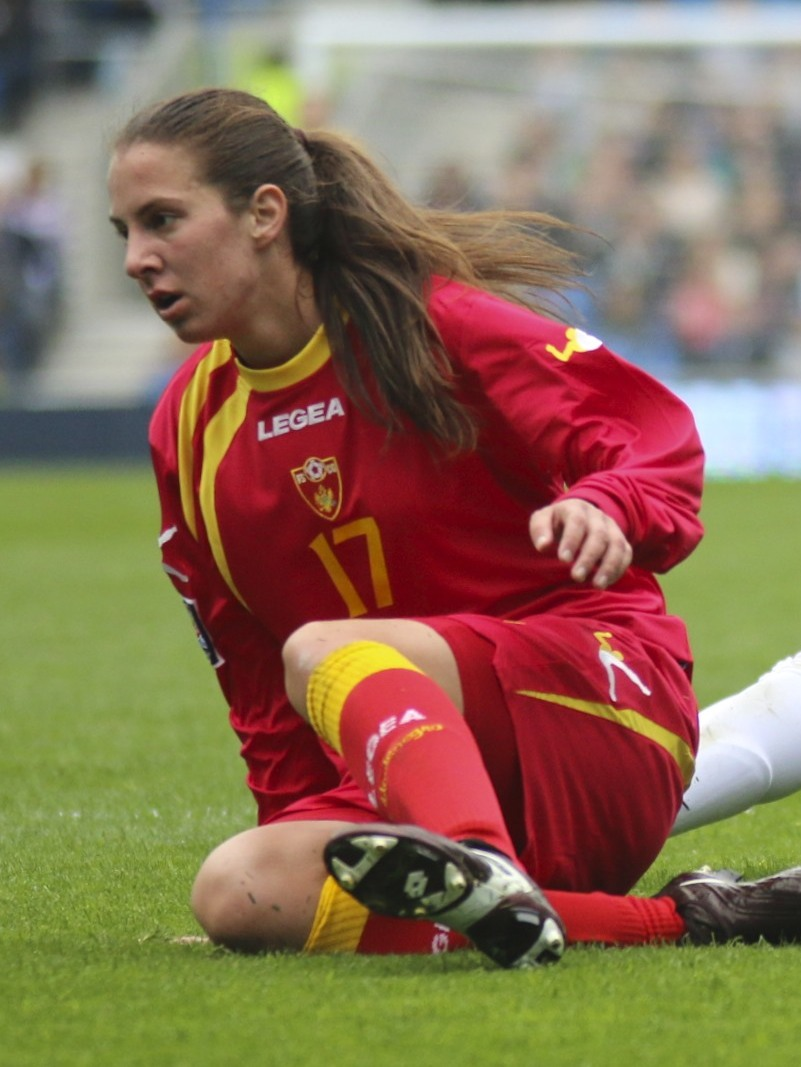

Personal information
- Full name: Jovana Mrkić
- Date of birth: 3 March 1994 (age 32)
- Place of birth: Montenegro, FR Yugoslavia
- Position: Defender

Team information
- Current team: ŽFK Ekonomist
- Number: 17

Senior career*
Years	Team	Apps	(Gls)
2012–	ŽFK Ekonomist		

International career^{‡}
2012–	Montenegro	20	(0)
- * Club domestic league appearances and goals as of 20:28, 3 April 2015 (UTC) ‡ National team caps and goals as of 20:28, 3 April 2015 (UTC)

Jovana Mrkić (born 3 March 1994) is a Montenegrin football defender currently playing for ŽFK Ekonomist.

She was elected president of the women's board of the Union of Professional Footballers of Montenegro (SPFCG).
