= Maida =

Maida may refer to:

== People ==
- Maida Abdallah (born 1970), Tanzanian politician
- Maida Arslanagić (born 1984), Croatian handball player
- Maida Bryant (1926–2016), New Zealand nurse, politician and community leader
- Maida Coleman (born 1954), American politician
- Maida Heatter, American chef and cookbook writer
- Maida Markgraf (born 1991), Montenegrin footballer
- Maida Herman Solomon (1891–1988), American psychiatric social worker
- Maida Townsend, American 21st century politician
- Maida (surname), surname

== Places ==
- Maida, a non-existent island in the North Atlantic
- Maida, Calabria, a comune in the province of Catanzaro, Italy
- Maida, North Dakota, an unincorporated community in the United States
- Maida Avenue, street in London, England

== Other uses ==
- Maida (flour), a white flour used in South Asia
- Battle of Maida, a Napoleonic battle in Calabria during the War of the Third Coalition
- French ship Jupiter, captured by the Royal Navy and renamed HMS Maida
- Maida (dog), belonging to Sir Walter Scott
- The Maida series of children's books, written by Inez Haynes Irwin

== See also ==
- Maidu, a California Native American group
- Mayda (disambiguation)
- Maida Vale (disambiguation)
