= Aleksandra Popović =

Montenegrin footballer

Personal information
- Full name: Aleksandra Anja Popović
- Date of birth: 3 May 1999 (age 27)
- Place of birth: Podgorica, FR Yugoslavia
- Height: 1.62 m (5 ft 4 in)
- Position: Left full back

Team information
- Current team: Split
- Number: 3

Senior career*
Years	Team	Apps	(Gls)
2016-2017	Breznica		
2017-2021	Vllaznia		
2020-2022	Breznica		
2022	Tomiris-Turan		
2022-2023	Vllaznia		
2023-2024	Split		
2024-	ŽNK Agram		

International career^{‡}
2015	Montenegro U17	3	(0)
2016–2017	Montenegro U19	6	(0)
2016–	Montenegro	65	(1)
- * Club domestic league appearances and goals ‡ National team caps and goals as of 20 July 2025

Aleksandra Popović (Serbian Cyrillic: Александра Поповић; born 3 May 1999) is a Montenegrin footballer who plays as a defender for Croatian club ŽNK Agram and the Montenegro women's national team.

== Career ==
Popović has been capped for the Montenegro national team, appearing for the team during the 2019 FIFA Women's World Cup qualifying cycle.

== International goals ==
No.	Date	Venue	Opponent	Score	Result	Competition
1.	10 November 2022	Stadion Topolica, Bar, Montenegro	Estonia	1–1	1–1	Friendly
