= Jasna Đoković =

Montenegrin footballer

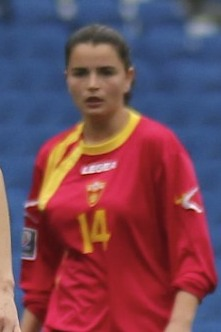
- Đoković playing for Montenegro in 2014

Personal information
- Full name: Jasna Đoković
- Date of birth: 29 October 1991 (age 35)
- Place of birth: Titograd, SR Montenegro, Yugoslavia
- Position: Midfielder

Team information
- Current team: Split

Youth career
- –2011: ŽFK Budućnost Podgorica

Senior career*
Years	Team	Apps	(Gls)
2011–2012	ŽFK Budućnost Podgorica		
2012–2014	Ekonomist		
2014–2021	SFK 2000		
2021–2024	Split		
2024-	ŽNK Agram		

International career^{‡}
2012–	Montenegro	99	(17)
- * Club domestic league appearances and goals ‡ National team caps and goals as of 9 June 2026

Jasna Đoković is a Montenegrin professional football midfielder who plays for Croatian club ŽNK Split and the Montenegro women's national team.

== Honours ==
=== Club ===
Ekonomist

- Montenegrin Women's Premier League: 2012–13, 2013–14

SFK 2000

- Bosnian Women's Premier League: 2014–15, 2015–16, 2016–17, 2017–18, 2018–19
- Bosnian Women's Cup: 2014–15, 2015–16, 2016–17, 2017–18, 2018–19

== International goals ==
No.	Date	Venue	Opponent	Score	Result	Competition
1.	28 April 2015	Skopje, North Macedonia	Macedonia	3–0	7–0	Friendly
2.	11 April 2017	Gundadalur, Tórshavn, Faroe Islands	Luxembourg	3–0	7–1	2019 FIFA Women's World Cup qualification
3.	11 April 2017	Gundadalur, Tórshavn, Faroe Islands	Luxembourg	4–0	7–1	2019 FIFA Women's World Cup qualification
4.	1 December 2020	Obolon Arena, Kyiv, Ukraine	Ukraine	1–1	1–2	UEFA Women's Euro 2022 qualifying
5.	10 April 2023	Camp FSCG, Podgorica, Montenegro	North Macedonia	1–0	3–1	Friendly
6.	17 July 2023	Stadionul CPSM, Vadul lui Vodă, Moldova	Moldova	4–0	5–0	Friendly
7.	1 December 2023	Podgorica City Stadium, Podgorica, Montenegro	Faroe Islands	6–0	9–0	2023–24 UEFA Women's Nations League
8.	1 December 2023	Podgorica City Stadium, Podgorica, Montenegro	Faroe Islands	9–0	9–0	2023–24 UEFA Women's Nations League
9.	5 April 2024	Podgorica City Stadium, Podgorica, Montenegro	Andorra	2–0	6–1	UEFA Women's Euro 2025 qualifying
10.	9 April 2024	Podgorica City Stadium, Podgorica, Montenegro	Faroe Islands	4–1	5–1	UEFA Women's Euro 2025 qualifying
11.	4 June 2024	Estadi Nacional, Andorra la Vella, Andorra	Andorra	4–1	5–1	UEFA Women's Euro 2025 qualifying
12.	3 December 2024	Petar Miloševski Training Centre, Skopje, North Macedonia	North Macedonia	3–1	5–1	Friendly
13.	3 December 2024	Petar Miloševski Training Centre, Skopje, North Macedonia	North Macedonia	4–1	5–1	Friendly
14.	8 April 2025	Gradski Stadion, Nikšić, Montenegro	Azerbaijan	1–1	1–1	2025 UEFA Women's Nations League C
15.	28 November 2025	Podgorica City Stadium, Podgorica, Montenegro	Romania	1–0	1–0	Friendly
16.	5 June 2026	Podgorica City Stadium, Podgorica, Montenegro	Wales	1–1	1–1	2027 FIFA Women's World Cup qualification
17.	9 June 2026	Loro Boriçi Stadium, Shkodër, Albania	Albania	2–1	2–5	2027 FIFA Women's World Cup qualification
