= Mujović =

Mujović is a Serbian surname (Serbian Cyrillic: Мујовић). Notable people with the surname include:

- Božica Mujović (born 1996), Montenegrin basketball player
- Ilda Mujović (born 1993), Montenegrin footballer
- Vjera Mujović (born 1972), Serbian actress
