= Iryna Zvarych =

Ukrainian footballer

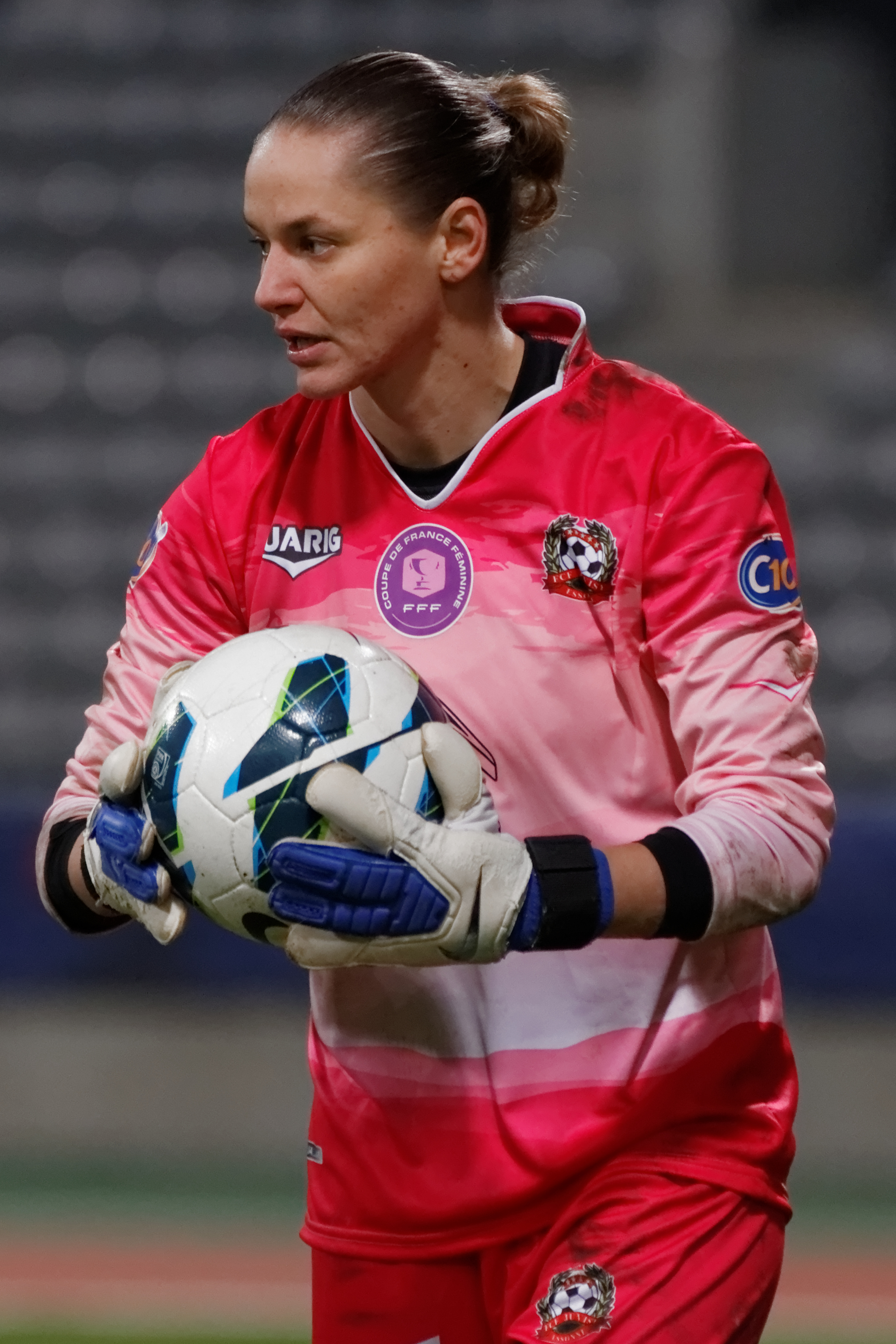
- Iryna Zvarych during PSG-Juvisy in 2013

Personal information
- Full name: Iryna Zvarych
- Date of birth: 8 May 1983 (age 43)
- Place of birth: Chernihiv, Ukrainian SSR, Soviet Union
- Height: 1.76 m (5 ft 9 in)
- Position: Goalkeeper

Team information
- Current team: Zvezda Perm
- Number: 23

Senior career*
| Years | Team | Apps | (Gls) |
| 1997–2003 | Lehenda Chernihiv | | |
| 2003 | Gömrükçü Baku | | |
| 2004 | Energiya Voronezh | | |
| 2005–2013 | Rossiyanka | 36 | |
| 2013 | Juvisy | 7 | |
| 2013–2014 | Fortuna Hjørring | | |
| 2014 | Rossiyanka | 5 | |
| 2014–2015 | Montpellier | 2 | |
| 2015– | Zvezda Perm | 55 | (0) |

International career
| 2000– | Ukraine | 30 | (0) |
- * Club domestic league appearances and goals

Iryna Zvarych (Ukrainian: Ірина Михайлівна Зварич; born 8 May 1983 in Chernihiv) is an international Ukrainian football goalkeeper playing for Zvezda Perm. She has won three Leagues and five national Cups with Rossiyanka, where she was the team's first choice goalkeeper. She can also play as a field player, and while playing for Energiya Voronezh she scored a hat trick over KFF Shkiponjat in the 2005 UEFA Women's Cup.

Zvarych took part in the UEFA Women's Euro 2009 as Nadiya Baranova's reserve. With Ukraine eliminated she was a starting player in the final group stage game against Finland, but she had to be replaced five minutes before half time following a collision with Laura Kalmari.

== Honours ==
Lehenda Chernihiv

- Ukrainian Women's League (3) 2000, 2001, 2002,
- Women's Cup (2) 2001, 2002

Rossiyanka

- Russian Leagues: (4) 2005, 2006, 2010, 2011–12
- Russian Cups: (5) 2005, 2006, 2008, 2009, 2010
- Albena Cups: 2005, 2006

Fortuna Hjørring

- Danish League (1) 2014

Zvezda Perm

- Russian Leagues (2) 2015, 2017
- Russian Women's Cup (4) 2015, 2016, 2018, 2019

Individual

- Ukrainian Woman Footballer of the Year: (2) 2012, 2013
