= UEFA Women's Euro 2022 qualifying Group I =

Football tournament qualification stage

Group I of the UEFA Women's Euro 2022 qualifying competition consisted of five teams: Germany, Ukraine, Republic of Ireland, Greece, and Montenegro. The composition of the nine groups in the qualifying group stage was decided by the draw held on 21 February 2019, 13:30 CET (UTC+1), at the UEFA headquarters in Nyon, Switzerland. with the teams seeded according to their coefficient ranking.

The group was played in home-and-away round-robin format between August 2019 and December 2020. The group winners and the three best runners-up among all nine groups (not counting results against the sixth-placed team) qualified directly for the final tournament, while the remaining six runners-up advance to the play-offs.

On 17 March 2020, all matches were put on hold due to the COVID-19 pandemic.

== Standings ==
Pos	Team	Pld	W	D	L	GF	GA	GD	Pts	Qualification	Germany	Ukraine	Ireland	Greece	Montenegro
1	Germany	8	8	0	0	46	1	+45	24	Final tournament	—	8–0	3–0	6–0	10–0
2	Ukraine	8	5	0	3	16	21	−5	15	Play-offs	0–8	—	1–0	4–0	2–1
3	Republic of Ireland	8	4	1	3	11	10	+1	13		1–3	3–2	—	1–0	2–0
4	Greece	8	2	1	5	6	21	−15	7		0–5	0–4	1–1	—	1–0
5	Montenegro	8	0	0	8	2	28	−26	0		0–3	1–3	0–3	0–4	—

Source: UEFA
Rules for classification: Tiebreakers

== Matches ==
Times are CET/CEST, (Note: CEST (UTC+2) for dates between 31 March and 26 October 2019 and between 29 March and 24 October 2020, and CET (UTC+1) for all other dates.) as listed by UEFA (local times, if different, are in parentheses).

31 August 2019
12:30

Germany	10–0	Montenegro
Huth 3'; Popp 8', 24', 38'; Bühl 34', 59'; Doorsoun 52'; Knaak 54'; Schüller 84'; Dallmann 88'	Report

Auestadion, Kassel
Attendance: 6,275
Referee: Zulema González González (Spain)

3 September 2019
16:00 (17:00 EEST)

Ukraine	0–8	Germany
	Report	Däbritz 5', 80', 88'; Magull 29'; Rauch 32'; Oberdorf 54'; Huth 85'; Maier 90+2'

Arena Lviv, Lviv
Attendance: 988
Referee: Tess Olofsson (Sweden)
3 September 2019
20:30 (19:30 IST)

Republic of Ireland	2–0	Montenegro
Toland 7'; McCabe 69' (pen.)	Report

Tallaght Stadium, Dublin
Attendance: 3,423
Referee: Catarina Campos (Portugal)

5 October 2019
14:00

Germany	8–0	Ukraine
Bühl 7', 58', 61'; Gwinn 30'; Magull 37', 42', 90+3'; Leupolz 87'	Report

New Tivoli, Aachen
Attendance: 5,504
Referee: Lorraine Clark (Scotland)

8 October 2019
14:00 (15:00 EEST)

Greece	0–5	Germany
	Report	Popp 33'; Oberdorf 40'; Starke 66'; Bremer 75'; Bühl 90'

Kleanthis Vikelidis Stadium, Thessaloniki
Attendance: 510
Referee: Vera Opeykina (Russia)
8 October 2019
20:30 (19:30 IST)

Republic of Ireland	3–2	Ukraine
McCabe 25'; Jarrett 28'; Shmatko 53' (o.g.)	Report	Shmatko 34'; Ovdiychuk 43'

Tallaght Stadium, Dublin
Attendance: 5,328
Referee: Désirée Grundbacher (Switzerland)

6 November 2019
13:00

Montenegro	0–4	Greece
	Report	Sidira 14', 78'; Kokoviadou 51'; Vardali 90+3'

Podgorica City Stadium, Podgorica
Attendance: 53
Referee: Reelika Turi (Estonia)

12 November 2019
14:00 (15:00 EET)

Greece	1–1	Republic of Ireland
Spyridonidou 90+3'	Report	Barrett 13'

Nea Smyrni Stadium, Athens
Attendance: 500
Referee: Henrikke Nervik (Norway)

5 March 2020
20:15 (19:15 GMT)

Republic of Ireland	1–0	Greece
Caldwell 45'	Report

Tallaght Stadium, Dublin
Attendance: 4511
Referee: María Dolores Martínez Madrona (Spain)

11 March 2020
16:00

Montenegro	0–3	Republic of Ireland
	Report	Caldwell 12'; McCabe 83'; O'Sullivan 85'

Stadion pod Malim brdom, Petrovac
Attendance: 0
Referee: Maria Marotta (Italy)

18 September 2020 (Note: All matches originally scheduled to be played in April and June 2020 were postponed due to the COVID-19 pandemic in Europe. These matches were subsequently rescheduled to be played between September and October 2020.)
20:00

Montenegro	1–3	Ukraine
Dešić 63'	Report	Apanaschenko 23'; Kunina 60'; Bulatović 66' (o.g.)

DG Arena, Podgorica
Attendance: 0
Referee: Viola Raudziņa (Latvia)

19 September 2020
14:00

Germany	3–0	Republic of Ireland
Hegering 8'; Marozsán 38'; Schüller 41'	Report

Stadion Essen, Essen
Attendance: 0
Referee: Monika Mularczyk (Poland)

22 September 2020
16:07

Montenegro	0–3	Germany
	Report	Freigang 3'; Leupolz 45+2'; Lohmann 59'

Podgorica City Stadium, Podgorica
Attendance: 0
Referee: Ainara Andrea Acevedo Dudley (Spain)
22 September 2020
18:00 (19:00 EEST)

Ukraine	4–0	Greece
Kozlova 59', 71'; Kravets 88'; Apanaschenko 90+5'	Report

Obolon Arena, Kyiv
Attendance: 0
Referee: Aleksandra Česen (Slovenia)

22 October 2020
16:30 (17:30 EEST)

Greece	1–0	Montenegro
Markou 84'	Report

Leoforos Alexandras Stadium, Athens
Attendance: 0
Referee: Miriama Matulová (Slovakia)

23 October 2020
18:00 (19:00 EEST)

Ukraine	1–0	Republic of Ireland
O'Gorman 25' (o.g.)	Report

Obolon Arena, Kyiv
Attendance: 0
Referee: Ivana Martinčić (Croatia)

27 October 2020
16:30 (17:30 EET)

Greece	0–4	Ukraine
	Report	Pantsulaia 5'; Kravets 29', 55'; Kunina 83'

Leoforos Alexandras Stadium, Athens
Attendance: 0
Referee: Shona Shukrula (Netherlands)

27 November 2020 (Note: Match originally scheduled to be played on 19 September 2020 was rearranged following postponements to other matches due to the COVID-19 pandemic in Europe.)
16:00

Germany	6–0	Greece
Hegering 17'; Freigang 21', 39', 45'; Dallmann 72'; Krumbiegel 90+2'	Report

Audi Sportpark, Ingolstadt
Attendance: 0
Referee: Marta Frías Acedo (Spain)

1 December 2020 (Note: Matches originally scheduled to be played on 22 September 2020 were rearranged following postponements to other matches due to the COVID-19 pandemic in Europe.)
18:00 (19:00 EET)

Ukraine	2–1	Montenegro
Basanska 5' (pen.); Kunina 74'	Report	Đoković 6'

Obolon Arena, Kyiv
Attendance: 0
Referee: Frida Nielsen (Denmark)
1 December 2020
18:00 (17:00 GMT)

Republic of Ireland	1–3	Germany
McCabe 45' (pen.)	Report	Magull 21' (pen.); Waßmuth 29', 85'

Tallaght Stadium, Dublin
Attendance: 0
Referee: Sara Persson (Sweden)

== Goalscorers ==
There were 81 goals scored in 20 matches, for an average of 4.05 goals per match (as of 1 December 2020).

6 goals

- (Germany) Klara Bühl

5 goals

- (Germany) Lina Magull

4 goals

- (Germany) Laura Freigang
- (Germany) Alexandra Popp
- (Republic of Ireland) Katie McCabe

3 goals

- (Germany) Sara Däbritz
- (Ukraine) Darya Kravets
- (Ukraine) Nadiia Kunina

2 goals

- (Germany) Linda Dallmann
- (Germany) Marina Hegering
- (Germany) Svenja Huth
- (Germany) Melanie Leupolz
- (Germany) Lena Oberdorf
- (Germany) Lea Schüller
- (Germany) Tabea Waßmuth
- (Greece) Danai-Eleni Sidira
- (Republic of Ireland) Diane Caldwell
- (Ukraine) Daryna Apanaschenko
- (Ukraine) Nicole Kozlova

1 goal

- (Germany) Pauline Bremer
- (Germany) Sara Doorsoun
- (Germany) Giulia Gwinn
- (Germany) Turid Knaak
- (Germany) Paulina Krumbiegel
- (Germany) Sydney Lohmann
- (Germany) Leonie Maier
- (Germany) Dzsenifer Marozsán
- (Germany) Felicitas Rauch
- (Germany) Sandra Starke
- (Greece) Christina Kokoviadou
- (Greece) Eleni Markou
- (Greece) Anastasia Spyridonidou
- (Greece) Thomai Vardali
- (Republic of Ireland) Amber Barrett
- (Republic of Ireland) Rianna Jarrett
- (Republic of Ireland) Denise O'Sullivan
- (Republic of Ireland) Tyler Toland
- (Montenegro) Medina Dešić
- (Montenegro) Jasna Đoković
- (Ukraine) Olha Basanska
- (Ukraine) Olha Ovdiychuk
- (Ukraine) Natia Pantsulaia
- (Ukraine) Lyubov Shmatko

1 own goal

- (Republic of Ireland) Áine O'Gorman (against Ukraine)
- (Montenegro) Slađana Bulatović (against Ukraine)
- (Ukraine) Lyubov Shmatko (against Republic of Ireland)
