= Irena Bjelica =

Montenegrin football

Irena
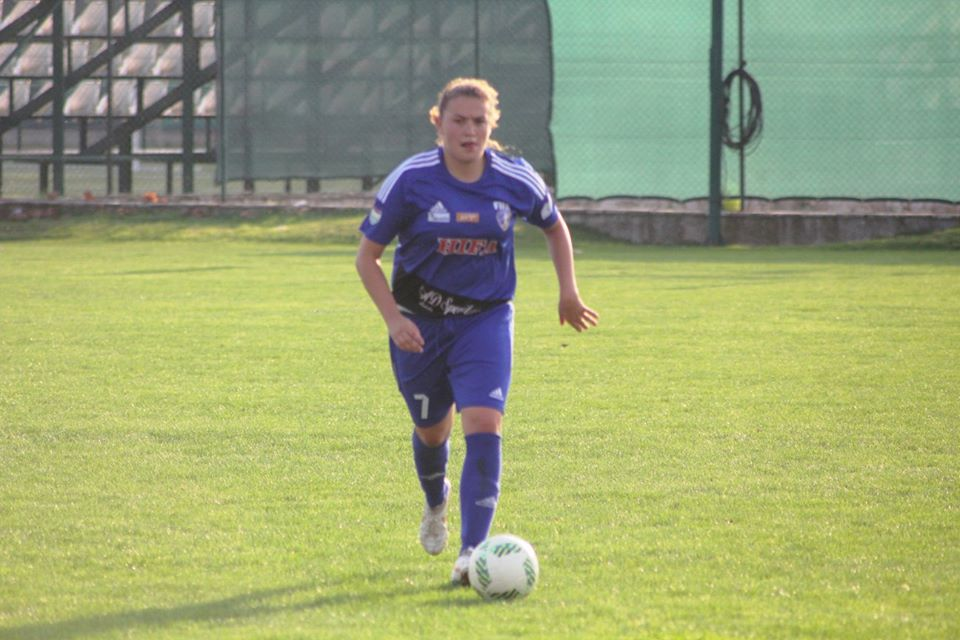

Personal information
- Full name: Irena Bjelica
- Date of birth: 9 January 1994 (age 32)
- Place of birth: Montenegro, FR Yugoslavia
- Position: Defender

Senior career*
| Years | Team | Apps | (Gls) |
| 2006–2016 | ŽFK Ekonomist | | |
| 2016– 2017 | ŽNK Iskra | 14 | (1) |
| 2017 | ŽF/NK Emina | 27 | (12) |

International career
| 2012– | Montenegro | 10 | (0) |
- * Club domestic league appearances and goals

Irena Bjelica (born 9 January 1994) is a Montenegrin football who played in the Montenegrin League for Ekonomist Niksic, with which she has also played the Champions League.She plays central defender and can also play as a right and left back. She played for Žnk Iskra from Bosnia and Herzegovina. Now she play for ZF/NK Emina Mostar from Bosnia and Herzegovina.
