= Nadiia Kunina =

Ukrainian footballer

Personal information
- Full name: Nadiia Kunina
- Date of birth: 29 March 2000 (age 26)
- Place of birth: Ukraine
- Position: Midfielder

Team information
- Current team: Kolos Kovalivka
- Number: 22

Senior career*
Years	Team	Apps	(Gls)
2018–2021	Zhytlobud-1	25	(19)
2021–2022	Linköpings	9	(0)
2022–2023	Austria Wien		
2023–	Kolos Kovalivka		

International career^{‡}
2018–	Ukraine	15	(3)
- * Club domestic league appearances and goals as of 26 March 2022 ‡ National team caps and goals as of 26 March 2022

Nadiia Kunina (Ukrainian: Надія Куніна; born 29 March 2000) is a Ukrainian footballer who plays as a midfielder for Kolos Kovalivka. She has played for the Ukraine women's national team.

== Career ==
Kunina has been capped for the Ukraine national team, appearing for the team during the 2019 FIFA Women's World Cup qualifying cycle.

== International goals ==
Scores and results list Ukraine's goal tally first.

No.	Date	Venue	Opponent	Score	Result	Competition
1.	18 September 2020	DG Arena, Podgorica, Montenegro	Montenegro	2–0	3–1	UEFA Women's Euro 2022 qualifying
2.	27 October 2020	Leoforos Alexandras Stadium, Athens, Greece	Greece	4–0	4–0	UEFA Women's Euro 2022 qualifying
3.	1 December 2020	Obolon Arena, Kyiv, Ukraine	Montenegro	2–1	2–1	UEFA Women's Euro 2022 qualifying
4.	2 September 2022	Tórsvøllur, Tórshavn, Faroe Islands	Faroe Islands	1–0	3–0	2023 FIFA Women's World Cup qualification
5.	2 September 2022	Tórsvøllur, Tórshavn, Faroe Islands	Faroe Islands	2–0	3–0	2023 FIFA Women's World Cup qualification
