= Helena Božić =

Montenegrin footballer

Personal information
- Date of birth: 14 February 1997 (age 29)
- Place of birth: Nikšić, Montenegro, FR Yugoslavia
- Height: 1.77 m (5 ft 10 in)
- Position: Defender

Team information
- Current team: Dynamo Moscow
- Number: 99

Senior career*
Years	Team	Apps	(Gls)
- Ekonomist
- Crvena zvezda
- Vllaznia Shkodër
2019–2021	Partizán Bardejov		
2021	Pomurje	10	(2)
2022	Åland United	18	(1)
2023–	Dynamo Moscow	52	(5)

International career^{‡}
2013	Montenegro U17	3	(0)
2014–2015	Montenegro U19	6	(1)
2015–	Montenegro	67	(3)
- * Club domestic league appearances and goals as of 15 August 2025 ‡ National team caps and goals as of 15 August 2025

Helena Božić (Serbian Cyrillic: Хелена Божић; born 14 February 1997) is a Montenegrin footballer who plays as a defender for Dynamo Moscow and the Montenegro women's national team.

== Career ==
Božić has been capped for the Montenegro national team, appearing for the team during the 2019 FIFA Women's World Cup qualifying cycle.

== International Goals ==
No.	Date	Venue	Opponent	Score	Result	Competition
1	26 November 2021	Centenary Stadium, Ta'Qali, Malta	Malta	1–0	2–0	2023 FIFA Women's World Cup qualification
2	17 July 2023	Stadionul CPSM, Vadul lui Vodă, Moldova	Moldova	1–0	5–0	Friendly
3	5 April 2024	Podgorica City Stadium, Podgorica, Montenegro	Andorra	5–1	6–1	UEFA Women's Euro 2025 qualifying
