= Mayda (disambiguation) =

Mayda is a non-existent island in the North Atlantic Ocean.

Mayda may also refer to:

- Mayda Insula, an insula (island) in the Kraken Mare on Titan, the largest moon of Saturn, named after the imaginary island
- Mayda, an 1883 novel by Srpouhi Dussap, the first novel written by an Armenian woman
- Mayda Munny, a character in Richie Rich comics
- Mayda Navarro, a Mexican who competed in figure skating at the 1992 Winter Olympics
- Mayda Royero, screenwriter for the 1990 Cuban film Hello Hemingway

== See also ==
- Maida (disambiguation)
