= Maida Markgraf =

Montenegrin association football player

Personal information
- Full name: Maida Markgraf
- Birth name: Maida Mujović
- Date of birth: 13 March 1991 (age 35)
- Place of birth: Bijelo Polje, SR Montenegro, SFR Yugoslavia
- Position: Defender

Youth career
- ESV Merseburg
- Sportring Mücheln

Senior career*
Years	Team	Apps	(Gls)
2007–2010	Magdeburger FFC		
2010–2012	SV Merseburg 99		
2012–2018	SVE Bad Dürrenberg		

International career^{‡}
2012	Montenegro	2	(0)
- * Club domestic league appearances and goals as of 26 October 2018 ‡ National team caps and goals as of 26 October 2018

Maida Markgraf (née Mujović; born 13 March 1991) is a Montenegrin footballer.

== Career ==
Mujović started her career with ESV Merseburg, and later played for Sporting Mücheln, along with her sister Ilda. In the summer of 2007, Mujović transferred to German Regionalliga team Magdeburger FFC, where she again played with her sister. In 2010, Mujović transferred to SV Merseburg 99. In the summer of 2012, Markgraf signed for SVE Bad Dürrenberg, where she once again played with her sister.

== International career ==
In May 2012, Markgraf made her debut for Montenegro in a friendly against Albania.

== Family ==
Markgraf's sister Ilda Mujović has also played for the Montenegrin national team. Markgraf married in early 2012.
