= Maida Vale (disambiguation) =

Maida Vale may refer to:

- Maida Vale, an area of London, United Kingdom
  - Maida Vale Studios, a complex of seven BBC studios
  - Maida Vale tube station
  - Maida Vale (NWLR) tube station, a planned but never built underground train station
  - The electoral ward, Maida Vale, on Westminster City Council
- Maida Vale, Western Australia, a suburb of Perth
- Maida Vale (album), by Van der Graaf Generator
- Maida Vale, Singapore, a road in Seletar off Piccadilly Circus
- Maida Vale, Queensland (also written as Maidavale), a neighbouring in the Shire of Burdekin, Queensland, Australia

== See also ==
- Maida (disambiguation)
- Vale (disambiguation)
