= Maida (surname) =

Maida is a surname. Notable people with the name include:

- Adam Maida (born 1930), American Catholic archbishop and cardinal
- Kevin Maida (born 1992), American lead guitarist for pop punk band Knuckle Puck
- Luisa Maida (born 1979), Salvadoran sport shooter
- Raine Maida (born 1970), Canadian lead singer and primary songwriter of the alternative rock band Our Lady Peace
- Sal Maida (1948–2025), American bass guitarist
- John Stuart, Count of Maida (1759–1815), British lieutenant general during the Napoleonic Wars

== See also ==
- Maida (disambiguation)
