= Tetyana Chorna =

Ukrainian footballer (born 1981)

Personal information
- Full name: Tetyana Chorna
- Date of birth: 25 February 1981 (age 45)
- Place of birth: Chernihiv, Soviet Union
- Position: Striker

Senior career*
Years	Team	Apps	(Gls)
1995–2000	Lehenda Chernihiv	62	(7)
2001	Lada Togliatti		
2002	Metalurh Donetsk		
2003–2005	Lada Togliatti		
2006	Nadezhda Noginsk		
2007–2008	Zvezda Perm		
2008–2016	WFC Rossiyanka	90	(9)

International career
1997–2015	Ukraine	24	(4)
- * Club domestic league appearances and goals

Tetyana Chorna (Ukrainian: Тетяна Михайлівна Чорна) is a former Ukrainian football midfielder, who played for Rossiyanka in the Russian Championship. She previously played for Lehenda Chernihiv and Metalurg Donetsk in the Ukrainian League and Lada Togliatti, Nadezhda Noginsk and Zvezda Perm in Russia.

== National team ==
She was a member of the Ukrainian national team and took part in the 2009 European Championship, playing as a starter against the Netherlands and Denmark.

== Titles ==
- 3 Russian Leagues (2004, 2007, 2010)
- 5 Russian Cups (2005, 2006, 2008, 2009, 2010)

Lehenda Chernihiv

- Ukrainian League (2000)

Individual

- Ukrainian Woman Footballer of the Year: (1) 2011
