= Jelena Karličić =

Montenegrin footballer (born 2002)

Personal information
- Full name: Jelena Karličić
- Date of birth: 5 October 2002 (age 24)
- Place of birth: Montenegro, FR Yugoslavia
- Position: Forward

Team information
- Current team: Beşiktaş J.K.
- Number: 19

Senior career*
Years	Team	Apps	(Gls)
- Breznica
2022–2024	Bordeaux	37	(0)
2024–2025	ALG	22	(4)
2025	Fatih Vatan	6	(4)

International career^{‡}
2017–2018	Montenegro U17	9	(5)
2018–2020	Montenegro U19	10	(2)
2019–	Montenegro	60	(2)
- * Club domestic league appearances and goals as of 2 November 2025 ‡ National team caps and goals as of 15 August 2025

Jelena Karličić (born 5 October 2002) is a Montenegrin women's football forward who plays in the Turkish Super League for Beşiktaş J.K. and has appeared for the Montenegro women's national team.

== Club career ==
End August 2024, Karličić moved to Turkey, and signed with the Gaziantep-based club ALG to play in the 2024–25 Super League.

For the 2025–26 Turkish Super League season, she transferred to Fatih Vatan in Istanbul.

== International career ==
Karličić has been capped for the Montenegro national team, appearing for the team during the UEFA Women's Euro 2021 qualifying cycle.

== International goals ==
No.	Date	Venue	Opponent	Score	Result	Competition
1.	10 April 2023	Camp FSCG, Podgorica, Montenegro	North Macedonia	2–1	3–1	Friendly
2.	30 November 2024	Petar Miloševski Training Centre, Skopje, North Macedonia	North Macedonia	1–1	2–3	Friendly
3.	27 October 2025	Stadion Hrvatski vitezovi, Dugopolje, Croatia	Croatia	1–0	1–2	Friendly
