= Nadiya Baranova =

Ukrainian football goalie (born 1983)

Personal information
- Full name: Nadiya Baranova
- Date of birth: 5 July 1983 (age 43)
- Place of birth: Chernihiv, Ukraine
- Height: 1.79 m (5 ft 10 1/2 in)
- Position: Goalkeeper

Senior career*
Years	Team	Apps	(Gls)
1999–2006	WFC Lehenda Chernihiv	67	(1)
2007–2012	Zvezda-2005 Perm		
- * Club domestic league appearances and goals

Nadiya Baranova (Ukrainian: Надія Андріївна Баранова; born 5 July 1983) is a former Ukrainian football goalkeeper.

== Honours ==
Zvezda-2005 Perm

- Top Division: 2007, 2008, 2009
- Russian Women's Cup: 2007, 2012

Lehenda Chernihiv

- Ukrainian Women's League: 2000, 2001, 2002, 2005,
- Women's Cup: 2001, 2002, 2005,
