= Ilda Mujović =

Montenegrin association football player

Personal information
- Date of birth: 2 May 1993 (age 33)
- Place of birth: Bijelo Polje, Montenegro, FR Yugoslavia
- Position: Midfielder

Youth career
- ESV Merseburg
- –2007: Sportring Mücheln
- 2007–2010: Magdeburger FFC

Senior career*
Years	Team	Apps	(Gls)
2010–2012	Magdeburger FFC	16	(0)
2012–2013	SVE Bad Dürrenberg		
2014–2016	Hallescher FC	42	(2)

International career^{‡}
2012	Montenegro	1	(1)
- * Club domestic league appearances and goals as of 26 October 2018 ‡ National team caps and goals as of 26 October 2018

Ilda Mujović (born 2 May 1993) is a Montenegrin footballer.

== Career ==
Mujović, who plays as a midfielder, started her career with ESV Merseburg, and later played for Sporting Mücheln, along with her sister Maida. In the summer of 2007, Mujović transferred to German Regionalliga team Magdeburger FFC, where she again played with her sister. In 2012, Mujović transferred to SV Eintracht Bad Dürrenberg.

== International career ==
In May 2012, Mujović made her debut for Montenegro in a friendly against Albania. She scored a goal on debut.

== Family ==
Mujović's sister Maida Markgraf (née Mujović) has also played for the Montenegrin national team.
