= Medina Dešić =

Montenegrin footballer

Personal information
- Date of birth: 15 September 1993 (age 33)
- Place of birth: Erlenbach am Main, Germany
- Height: 1.77 m (5 ft 10 in)
- Position: Forward

Team information
- Current team: Werder Bremen
- Number: 9

Senior career*
| Years | Team | Apps | (Gls) |
| 2013–2018 | ETSV Würzburg | 80 | (18) |
| 2018–2021 | Würzburger Kickers | 34 | (35) |
| 2021–2023 | RB Leipzig | 39 | (17) |
| 2023–2025 | 1. FC Nürnberg | 43 | (24) |
| 2025– | Werder Bremen | 34 | (7) |

International career^{‡}
| 2020– | Montenegro | 45 | (15) |
- * Club domestic league appearances and goals as of 21 November 2026 ‡ National team caps and goals as of 13 October 2026

Medina Dešić (born 15 September 1993) is a professional footballer who plays as a forward for Frauen-Bundesliga club Werder Bremen. Born in Germany, she plays for the Montenegro women's national team.

== Early life ==
Dešić was raised in Erlenbach am Main.

== Club career ==
On 16 August 2021, Dešić transferred from Würzburger Kickers to RB Leipzig, starting a professional career.

== International career ==
Dešić made her senior debut for Montenegro in mid-January 2020 in a friendly match against Bosnia and Herzegovina.

On 18 September 2020, she scored her first international goal for Montenegro against Ukraine in a 3–1 loss at the UEFA Women's Euro 2022 qualifying.

== Career statistics ==
=== International ===
As of match played 13 October 2026

Appearances and goals by national team and year
| National team | Year | Apps | Goals |
|---|---|---|---|
Montenegro
| Montenegro | 2020 | 6 | 1 |
| Montenegro | 2021 | 3 | 0 |
| Montenegro | 2022 | 4 | 1 |
| Montenegro | 2023 | 7 | 2 |
| Montenegro | 2024 | 10 | 5 |
| Montenegro | 2025 | 7 | 2 |
| Montenegro | 2026 | 8 | 4 |
| Total | | 45 | 15 |

Scores and results list Montenegro's goal tally first, score column indicates score after each Dešić goal.

List of international goals scored by Medina Dešić
| No. | Date | Venue | Opponent | Score | Result | Competition |
|---|---|---|---|---|---|---|
| 1 | 18 September 2020 | DG Arena, Podgorica, Montenegro | Ukraine | 1–2 | 1–3 | UEFA Women's Euro 2022 qualifying |
| 2 | 14 November 2022 | Stadion Topolica, Bar, Montenegro | Estonia | 1–0 | 1–2 | Friendly |
| 3 | 14 July 2023 | Stadionul CPSM, Vadul lui Vodă, Moldova | Moldova | 1–1 | 1–2 | Friendly |
| 4 | 17 July 2023 | Stadionul CPSM, Vadul lui Vodă, Moldova | Moldova | 3–0 | 5–0 | Friendly |
| 5 | 27 February 2024 | Windsor Park, Belfast, Northern Ireland | Northern Ireland | 1–0 | 1–1 | 2023–24 UEFA Women's Nations League play-offs |
| 6 | 5 April 2024 | Podgorica City Stadium, Podgorica, Montenegro | Andorra | 3–1 | 6–1 | UEFA Women's Euro 2025 qualifying |
| 7 | 5 April 2024 | Podgorica City Stadium, Podgorica, Montenegro | Andorra | 4–1 | 6–1 | UEFA Women's Euro 2025 qualifying |
| 8 | 9 April 2024 | Podgorica City Stadium, Podgorica, Montenegro | Faroe Islands | 5–1 | 5–1 | UEFA Women's Euro 2025 qualifying |
| 9 | 4 June 2024 | Estadi Nacional, Andorra la Vella, Andorra | Andorra | 3–1 | 5–1 | UEFA Women's Euro 2025 qualifying |
| 10 | 3 June 2025 | LSC Druskininkai Stadium, Druskininkai, Lithuania | Lithuania | 1–0 | 1–0 | 2025 UEFA Women's Nations League |
| 11 | 24 October 2025 | Stadion ŠRC Marijan Šuto Mrma, Zmijavci, Croatia | Croatia | 3–0 | 3–1 | Friendly |
| 12 | 9 June 2026 | Loro Boriçi Stadium, Shkodër, Albania | Albania | 1–0 | 2–5 | 2027 FIFA Women's World Cup qualification |
| 13 | 9 October 2026 | DG Arena, Podgorica, Montenegro | Bosnia and Herzegovina | 1–0 | 3–2 | Friendly |
| 14 | 13 October 2026 | Stade Municipal, Rumelange, Luxembourg | Luxembourg | 2–0 | 4–0 | Friendly |
| 15 | 13 October 2026 | Stade Municipal, Rumelange, Luxembourg | Luxembourg | 3–0 | 4–0 | Friendly |

== Honours ==
RB Leipzig

- 2. Frauen-Bundesliga: 2022–23
