= Nađa Stanović =

Montenegrin footballer

Personal information
- Date of birth: 10 September 1999 (age 27)
- Position: Midfielder

Senior career*
Years	Team	Apps	(Gls)
2014–2019	UKS SMS Łódź		
2019–2021	GKS Katowice	28	(4)
2021–2023	Czarni Sosnowiec	34	(5)
2023–2024	Ferencváros		
2024–2026	Slavia Prague	14	(4)

International career^{‡}
2015	Montenegro U17	3	(0)
2016–2017	Montenegro U19	6	(1)
2018–	Montenegro	37	(3)
- * Club domestic league appearances and goals as of 15 August 2025 ‡ National team caps and goals as of 15 August 2025

Nađa Stanović (born 10 September 1999) is a Montenegrin footballer who plays as a left midfielder and has appeared for the Montenegro women's national team.

== Career ==
Stanović has been capped for the Montenegro national team, appearing for the team during the UEFA Women's Euro 2021 qualifying cycle.

On 8 July 2024, Stanović signed a two-year contract with Slavia Prague.

== Honours ==
Czarni Sosnowiec

- Ekstraliga: 2020–21
- Polish Cup: 2020–21, 2021–22
