= 2012 Russian Women's Cup =

Tournament details
- Country: Russia

The 2012 Russian Women's Cup was the 20th edition of the Russian women's football national cup organized by the Russian Football Union, running from 18 April to 5 May 2011. It is contested by all eight teams from the 2012 Russian Championship.

Zvezda Perm have won the cup for the second time after 2007.

== Quarter-finals ==
18 April 2012

Zvezda Perm	4–0	Ryazan
Kurochkina 9'; Ruiz 11', 33', 51'

Zvezda Stadium, Perm
18 April 2012

Energiya Voronezh	2–2	Kubanochka Krasnodar
Danilova 72'; Foxhoven 90'	(PSO: 4–2)	Kostareva 16'; Samoylova 75'

Central Stadium, Voronezh
18 April 2012

Rossiyanka	2–0	Izmaylovo
Petrova 36'; Jakobsson 65'

Rossiyanka Stadium, Krasnoarmeysk
18 April 2012

Zorky Krasnogorsk	8–1	Mordovochka Saransk
Kátia 21', 36'; Leyva 34'; Morozova 58', 67'; Conti 61', 79', 90'		Kornievets 75'

Novye Stadium, Khimki

== Semifinals ==
30 April 2012

Energiya Voronezh	1–2	Zvezda Perm
Simone 57'	Report	Ruiz 75'; Skotnikova 86'

Central Stadium, Voronezh
Attendance: 500
30 April 2012

Rossiyanka	1–6	Zorky Krasnogorsk
Cristiane 39'	Report	Leyva 3', 74'; Conti 21'; Morozova 25'; Sochneva 31'; Kátia 54'

Rossiyanka Stadium, Krasnoarmeysk

== Final ==
2012

Zorky Krasnogorsk	1–2	Zvezda Perm
