= Slađana Bulatović =

Montenegrin footballer (born 1994)

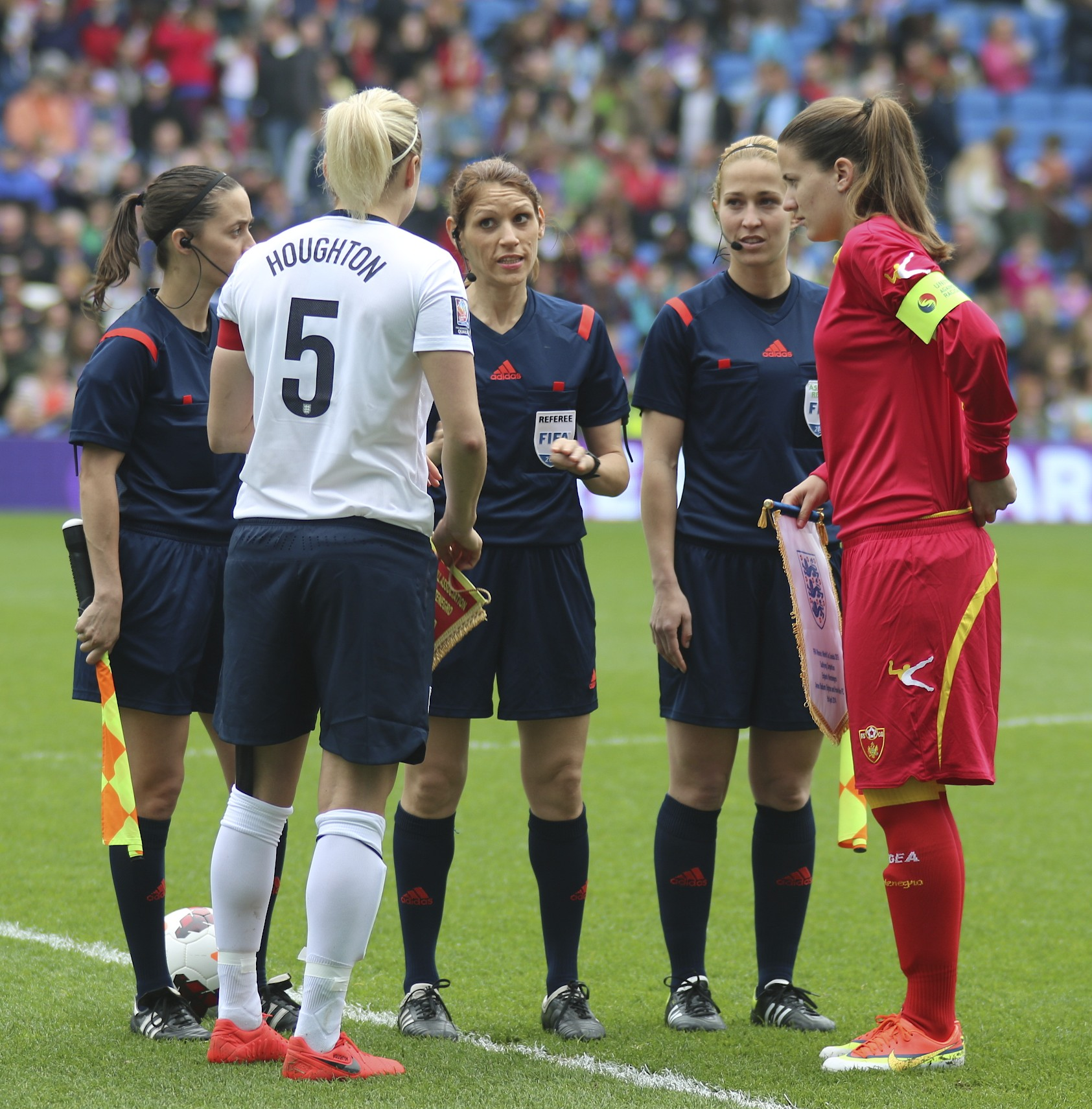
- Bulatović (r) in 2014

Personal information
- Full name: Slađana Bulatović
- Date of birth: 4 May 1994 (age 32)
- Place of birth: Podgorica, Montenegro, FR Yugoslavia
- Height: 1.74 m (5 ft 8 1/2 in)
- Position: Forward

Team information
- Current team: Ankara BB Fomget
- Number: 10

Senior career*
Years	Team	Apps	(Gls)
2010–2012	Mašinac Niš	50	(43)
2013–2014	Ekonomist	18	(55)
2014–2015	Banja Luka	18	(64)
2015–2018	Ferencváros	61	(61)
2018–2019	Fundación Albacete	25	(4)
2019–2022	Rayo Vallecano	72	(10)
2023	Mynavi Sendai	7	(1)
2023–	Ankara BB Fomget	48	(14)

International career
2013–	Montenegro	91	(31)
- * Club domestic league appearances and goals

Slađana Bulatović (born 4 May 1994) is a Montenegrin professional footballer who plays as a forward for Ankara BB Fomget in the Turkish Super League and the Montenegro national team, where she serves as its captain.

== Club career ==
She was named as the top goalscorer in Hungarian football league 2015–2016.

By August 2023, she moved to Turkey, and signed a deal with Ankara BB Fomget to play in the 2023–24 Super League season. That season, she became runners-up, and won the champions title in the 2024–25 season.

== Career statistics ==
Club	Season	League			Cup		Continental		Total	
Club	Season	Division	Apps	Goals	Apps	Goals	Apps	Goals	Apps	Goals
Mašinac Niš	2010-11	Montenegro Women's League					1	0	1	0
Ekonomist	2013-14	Montenegro Women's League	18	55			3	1	21	56
Banja Luka	2014-15	Bosnian Women's League	18	64					18	64
Ferenvarosi	2015-16	Hungary Women's League	21	30	3	2	2	0	26	32
Ferenvarosi	2016-17	Hungary Women's League	20	15	4	9	2	1	26	25
Ferenvarosi	2017-18	Hungary Women's League	20	16	3	1			23	17
Ferenvarosi	Total		61	61	10	12	4	1	75	74
Alba	2018-19	Liga F	25	4	1	0			26	4
Rayo Vallecano	2019-20	Liga F	18	1	1	0			19	1
Rayo Vallecano	2020-21	Liga F	28	7	2	0			30	7
Rayo Vallecano	2021-22	Liga F	26	2					26	2
Rayo Vallecano	Total		72	10	3	0			75	10
Mynavi Sendal	2023	Women J League	7	1	4	1			11	2
Ankara BB Fomget	2023–24	Super League	30	11	–	–	2	1	32	12
Ankara BB Fomget	2024–25	Super League	18	3	–	–			18	3
Ankara BB Fomget	Total		48	14	–	–	2	1	50	15
Career total			175	209	18	13	10	3	203	225

== International goals ==
No.	Date	Venue	Opponent	Score	Result	Competition
1.	18 May 2012	Loro Boriçi Stadium, Shkodër, Albania	Albania	2–?	3–4	Friendly
2.	18 May 2012	Loro Boriçi Stadium, Shkodër, Albania	Albania	3–?	3–4	Friendly
3.	19 June 2014	Stadion Mitar Mićo Goliš, Petrovac, Montenegro	Turkey	1–0	2–3	2015 FIFA Women's World Cup qualification
4.	19 June 2014	Stadion Mitar Mićo Goliš, Petrovac, Montenegro	Turkey	2–1	2–3	2015 FIFA Women's World Cup qualification
5.	28 April 2015	Skopje, North Macedonia	Macedonia	1–0	7–0	Friendly
6.	28 April 2015	Skopje, North Macedonia	Macedonia	5–0	7–0	Friendly
7.	28 April 2015	Skopje, North Macedonia	Macedonia	6–0	7–0	Friendly
8.	12 April 2016	Stadion Mitar Mićo Goliš, Petrovac, Montenegro	Finland	1–0	1–7	UEFA Women's Euro 2017 qualifying
9.	11 April 2017	Gundadalur, Tórshavn, Faroe Islands	Luxembourg	1–0	7–1	2019 FIFA Women's World Cup qualification
10.	11 April 2017	Gundadalur, Tórshavn, Faroe Islands	Luxembourg	2–0	7–1	2019 FIFA Women's World Cup qualification
11.	26 November 2017	Adem Jashari Olympic Stadium, Mitrovica, Kosovo	Kosovo	2–2	2–3	Friendly
12.	6 June 2018	Podgorica, Montenegro	Albania	1–0	1–0	Friendly
13.	9 June 2018	Podgorica, Montenegro	Albania	?–?	2–2	Friendly
14.	21 February 2021	Camp FSCG, Podgorica, Montenegro	North Macedonia	3–0	5–0	Friendly
15.	21 February 2021	Camp FSCG, Podgorica, Montenegro	North Macedonia	4–0	5–0	Friendly
16.	10 June 2021	Centenary Stadium, Ta' Qali, Malta	Malta	1–0	2–1	Friendly
17.	17 September 2021	FF BH Football Training Centre, Zenica, Bosnia & Herzegovina	Bosnia and Herzegovina	3–2	3–2	2023 FIFA Women's World Cup qualification
18.	21 October 2021	Camp FSCG, Podgorica, Montenegro	Azerbaijan	1–0	2–0	2023 FIFA Women's World Cup qualification
19.	15 February 2023	Camp FSCG, Podgorica, Montenegro	Moldova	2–0	6–1	Friendly
20.	18 February 2023	Camp FSCG, Podgorica, Montenegro	Moldova	1–0	2–0	Friendly
21.	18 February 2023	Camp FSCG, Podgorica, Montenegro	Moldova	2–0	2–0	Friendly
22.	1 December 2023	Podgorica City Stadium, Podgorica, Montenegro	Faroe Islands	1–0	9–0	2023–24 UEFA Women's Nations League
23.	1 December 2023	Podgorica City Stadium, Podgorica, Montenegro	Faroe Islands	5–0	9–0	2023–24 UEFA Women's Nations League
24.	5 December 2023	DG Arena, Podgorica, Montenegro	Cyprus	1–0	2–0	2023–24 UEFA Women's Nations League
25.	5 April 2024	Podgorica City Stadium, Podgorica, Montenegro	Andorra	1–0	6–1	UEFA Women's Euro 2025 qualifying
26.	5 April 2024	Podgorica City Stadium, Podgorica, Montenegro	Andorra	6–1	6–1	UEFA Women's Euro 2025 qualifying
27.	31 May 2024	Theodoros Vardinogiannis Stadium, Heraklion, Greece	Greece	2–2	2–2	UEFA Women's Euro 2025 qualifying
28.	4 June 2024	Estadi Nacional, Andorra la Vella, Andorra	Andorra	5–1	5–1	UEFA Women's Euro 2025 qualifying
29.	16 July 2024	Camp FSCG, Podgorica, Montenegro	Greece	1–3	2–3	UEFA Women's Euro 2025 qualifying
30.	16 July 2024	Camp FSCG, Podgorica, Montenegro	Greece	2–3	2–3	UEFA Women's Euro 2025 qualifying
31.	18 April 2026	Gradski stadion, Nikšić, Montenegro	Czech Republic	1–1	1–4	2027 FIFA Women's World Cup qualification

== Honours ==
Turkish Women's Football Super League

Ankara BB Fomget
Champions (1): 2024–25
Runners-up (1): 2023–24
