= Red Star Belgrade (women's football) =

- Full name: Žеnski fudbalski klub Crvena zvezda
- Nicknames: Crveno-bele (Red and Whites)
- Founded: 2003; 23 years ago as LASK; 16 June 2011; 15 years ago as Crvena zvezda
- President: Sandra Sremčević
- Head coach: Goran Nikić
- League: SuperLiga
- 2025–26: Champions
- Website: https://www.crvenazvezdawomanfootballclub.com
Home colours	Away colours

Ženski fudbalski klub Crvena zvezda (Serbian Cyrillic: Женски фудбалски клуб Црвена звезда, English: Red Star Women's Football Club), commonly known as Red Star Belgrade, is a women's football club from Belgrade, Serbia. The club is a part of the Red Star Sports Society.

== Honours and achievements ==
- Serbian SuperLiga
  - Champions (3): 2023–24, 2024-25, 2025–26
  - Runners-up (6): 2011–12, 2014–15, 2016–17, 2017–18, 2021–22, 2022–23
  - Third place (4): 2013–14, 2015–16, 2019–20, 2020–21
- Serbian Cup
  - Winners (4): 2017–18, 2023–24, 2024-25, 2025-26
  - Runners-up (4): 2011–12, 2014–15, 2018–19, 2022–23
- Friendly tournaments
  - Winners (1): International Tournament Strumica 2017
  - Runners-up (1): International Tournament Sarajevo 2018
- Double
  - Winners (3): 2023–24, 2024-25, 2025-26

== Current squad ==
As of 15 November 2026

Note: Flags indicate national team as defined under FIFA eligibility rules; some limited exceptions apply. Players may hold more than one non-FIFA nationality.

No.	Pos.	Nation	Player
1	GK	SRB	Andrea Manojlović
2	DF	SRB	Anja Medić
3	DF	SRB	Ana Šćepanović
4	MF	SRB	Ivana Malijar
5	DF	SRB	Nada Joksić
6	DF	SRB	Jovana Miladinović
7	MF	SRB	Iva Miladinović
8	MF	SRB	Lana Zarubica
9	FW	SRB	Mirela Tenkov
10	MF	SRB	Sofija Sremčević
11	FW	USA	Cadence Whitley
12	GK	SRB	Nevena Eremić

No.	Pos.	Nation	Player
13	MF	SRB	Mia Stevanović
14	MF	USA	Nikolina Hadžibabić
15	DF	SRB	Natalija Vorkapić
16	FW	SRB	Marija Burgić
17	DF	SRB	Milica Šarić
18	FW	SRB	Maša Stokic
19	FW	SRB	Jana Panić
20	DF	SRB	Tijana Đorđević
21	MF	SRB	Sofija Mandić
22	MF	SRB	Dejana Stefanović
23	FW	SRB	Anđela Đenić
24	FW	PHI	Mallie Ramirez
