= ŽFK Ekonomist =

Montenegrin football club

- Full name: Ženski fudbalski klub Ekonomist
- Founded: 2007
- Ground: Stadion kraj Bistrice, Nikšić, Montenegro
- Capacity: 5,214
- League: Montenegrin Women's League
- 2023–24: 3rd

Ženski fudbalski klub Ekonomist (Cyrillic: Женски фудбалски клуб Економист), commonly abbreviated as ŽFK Ekonomist, is a women's football club based in Nikšić, Montenegro. Founded in 2007, the club competes in the Montenegrin Women's League and was the inaugural champion of the competition. In 2012, it became the first women's team from Montenegro to participate in the UEFA Women's Champions League. Prior to the establishment of the national league, the team won the FSCG Trophy once. The club has received support from Meridianbet.

== Titles ==
Montenegrin Women's League

- Champion (4): 2011–12, 2012–13, 2013–14, 2014–15
- Runner-up (3): 2015–16, 2016–17, 2017–18

FSCG Trophy (Trofej FSCG)

- Champion (1): 2011
- Runner-up (2): 2008–09, 2009–10

== Standings by season ==
Season	Competition	Ranking
2008–09	FSCG Trophy	2nd place
2009–10	FSCG Trophy	2nd place
2010–11	FSCG Trophy	Champion
2011–12	1. ŽFL	Champion
2012–13	1. ŽFL	Champion
2013–14	1. ŽFL	Champion
2014–15	1. ŽFL	Champion
2015–16	1. ŽFL	2nd place
2016–17	1. ŽFL	2nd place
2017–18	1. ŽFL	2nd place
2018–19	1. ŽFL	3rd place
2019–20	1. ŽFL	3rd place
2020–21	1. ŽFL	3rd place
2021–22	1. ŽFL	3rd place
2022–23	1. ŽFL	3rd place
2023–24	1. ŽFL	3rd place

== Record in UEFA competitions ==
Season	Competition	Stage	Opponent	Result
2012–13	Champions League	Qualifying Stage	(Belarus) Bobruichanka	1–5
2012–13	Champions League	Qualifying Stage	(Poland) Unia Racibórz	1–7
2012–13	Champions League	Qualifying Stage	(Slovakia) Slovan Bratislava	0–8
2013–14	Champions League	Qualifying Stage	(Faroe Islands) Klaksvík	1–1
2013–14	Champions League	Qualifying Stage	(Switzerland) Zürich	1–4
2013–14	Champions League	Qualifying Stage	(Portugal) Atlético Ouriense	1–1
2014–15	Champions League	Qualifying Stage	(Slovenia) Pomurje	0–4
2014–15	Champions League	Qualifying Stage	(Hungary) MKT	0–1
2014–15	Champions League	Qualifying Stage	(Estonia) Pärnu JK	1–2
2015–16	Champions League	Qualifying Stage	(Slovenia) Pomurje	0–4
2015–16	Champions League	Qualifying Stage	(Romania) Olimpia Cluj	1–6
2015–16	Champions League	Qualifying Stage	(Estonia) Pärnu JK	1–2

== Current squad ==
- As of 6 May 2020.
- Flags indicate national team as defined under FIFA eligibility rules. Players may hold more than one non-FIFA nationality.

Sortable table
Goalkeepers	Defenders	Midfielders	Forwards
1. (Montenegro) Marija Žižić; 12. (Serbia) Jovana Drezga; 20. (Montenegro) Marija Kecina	4. (Montenegro) Nina Vujičić; 6. (Montenegro) Marija Goranović; 9. (Montenegro) Irena Bjelica; 15. (Montenegro) Dijana Miljanić; 16. (Montenegro) Ivana Ivaštanin; 17. (Montenegro) Jovana Mrkić	8. (Montenegro) Nikolina Micunović; 14. (Serbia) Slađana Lazarević; 19. (Montenegro) Marija Roganović; 22. (Montenegro) Tina Begović	7. (Montenegro) Ivana Krivokapić

== Notable players ==
Former internationals:

Montenegro

Sladjana Bulatović; Jasna Đoković; Darija Đukić; Tatjana Đurković	Armisa Kuč; Jelena Sturanović; Ivona Turčinović; Andreja Vidić

== See also ==
- Montenegrin Women's League
- Football in Montenegro
