= ŽFK Budućnost Podgorica =

- Full name: Ženski fudbalski klub Budućnost Podgorica
- Founded: 2005
- Ground: Stadion pod Goricom, Podgorica, Montenegro
- Capacity: 11,080
- League: Montenegrin Women's League

ŽFK Budućnost is a women's football club from Podgorica, Montenegro, founded in 2005. Until 2016, the team was known as ŽFK Palma. It plays in the Montenegrin Women's League. It is the oldest women's football club in Montenegro. Under the name ŽFK Palma, they won two champion titles in Montenegrin Women's League. ŽFK Budućnost is a part of Budućnost Podgorica sports society.

== History ==
Founded at 2005 as ŽFK Palma, team won first two editions of Montenegrin Women's League (then FSCG trophy), on seasons 2008-09 and 2009–10. Palma played in First League until the end of season 2012–13.
At start of 2016, team was renamed. Under the new name, ŽFK Budućnost Podgorica became a part of most successful Montenegrin sports society - SD Budućnost Podgorica. After the few seasons, ŽFK Budućnost gained promotion to Montenegrin Women's League 2016–17.

=== Current squad ===
As of 19 August 2025

Note: Flags indicate national team as defined under FIFA eligibility rules; some limited exceptions apply. Players may hold more than one non-FIFA nationality.

No.	Pos.	Nation	Player
1	GK	BIH	Indira Faković
2	DF	MNE	Milica Radunović
3	DF	MNE	Danica Reljic
4	DF	MNE	Maja Šaranović
5	FW	CRO	Lana Rusković
6	MF	BIH	Zerina Piskić
7	DF	MNE	Jana Merdović
8	FW	MNE	Lidija Stanić
9	MF	MNE	Larisa Đurković
10	FW	MNE	Angelina Dresaj

No.	Pos.	Nation	Player
11	FW	BIH	Mejrema Medić
12	GK	MNE	Marija Vukovic
13	MF	MNE	Sanija Pačariz
14	MF	MNE	Ana Vlahovic
17	FW	MNE	Helena Živković
18	DF	MNE	Vladana Boričić
20	FW	MNE	Aleka Balević
22	MF	MNE	Amra Luković
25	DF	MNE	Vlada Milović
77	FW	KAZ	Karina Berikova

== International record ==
Season	Competition	Round	Opponent	Score	Result
2025–26	UEFA Women's Champions League	First qualifying round	(Slovakia) Spartak Myjava	0–3	3rd
2025–26	UEFA Women's Champions League	First qualifying round	(Moldova) Agarista Anenii Noi	3–0	3rd
2026–27	UEFA Women's Champions League	First qualifying round	(Azerbaijan) Neftçi	0–0 (a.e.t.) (3–4 p)	4th
2026–27	UEFA Women's Champions League	First qualifying round	(Israel) Hapoel Katamon Jerusalem	0–1	4th

== Honours and achievements ==
- National Championship:
  - winners (3): 2008–09, 2009–10, 2024–25
  - runners-up (2): 2011–12, 2019–20

== See also ==
- Montenegrin Women's League
- Football in Montenegro
