= Montenegrin Women's League =

- Founded: 2008 (as FSCG Trophy); 2011 (as 1. ŽFL)
- Country: Montenegro
- Confederation: UEFA
- Divisions: 1
- Number of clubs: 7
- Level on pyramid: 1
- Domestic cup: Montenegrin Cup (women)
- International cup: UEFA Champions League
- Current champions: Budućnost (3rd title) (2024–25)
- Most championships: Breznica (9 titles)
- Website: Federation
- Current: 2026–27 Montenegrin Women's League

The Montenegrin Women's Football league or 1. ŽFL is the top level women's football league of Montenegro. It is organized by the Football Association of Montenegro.

The winning team of the league is eligible for a spot in the UEFA Women's Champions League.

The first national women's football competition was held in the season 2008-09, but the league played its inaugural season in 2011-12.

== History ==
Women's football history in Montenegro started in the period after the Montenegrin independence referendum. Beside the fact that the first women's club was founded in 2005, competitions started years after that. In 2008, Football Association of Montenegro founded national women's team and first women's competition - a yearly tournament called FSCG Trophy. With its first season 2008-09, FSCG trophy matches lasted 60 minutes, with seven substitutes allowed. From season 2011-12, Montenegrin Women's First League is founded (commonly known as 1. ŽFL), with participation of the champion in the UEFA Women's Champions League.

=== FSCG Trophy (2008-2011) ===
Inaugural competition for women, Trophy of Montenegrin FA (Trofej FSCG) lasted three seasons. With matches' duration of 60 minutes, competition was preparation for founding of First Montenegrin Women's Football League.
First two editions of FSCG Trophy (2008–09, 2009–10) won ŽFK Palma from Podgorica (from season 2016-17 under the name ŽFK Budućnost Podgorica). On season 2010-11, winner was ŽFK Ekonomist from Nikšić. In the first season of FSCG trophy participated only four clubs, but until the season 2010-11 there was six members of the competition.

=== First Women's League (2011-) ===
First matches of Montenegrin Women's League (1. ŽFL) were played in autumn 2011. In its first season, new competition with conventional rules (90 minutes games, 3 substitutes) had participants from all three regions of Montenegro (northern, central and southern).
In period from 2011 to 2015, most successful squad in 1. ŽFL was ŽFK Ekonomist. They won four consecutive titles, mostly finishing the seasons without a single defeat. Successes of ŽFK Ekonomist finished on the season 2015-16, whose winner was ŽFK Breznica from Pljevlja. That was the beginning of ŽFK Breznica domination. They won eight titles in a row, including the season 2019-20, which was interrupted due to COVID-19 pandemic in Montenegro. Season 2020-21 was remembered by most dramatic title race, which won ŽFK Breznica, thanks to one single goal more than second-placed ŽFK Budućnost in their head-to-head matches.
Since foundation, 1. ŽFL had different number of participants: 2011/12 - 7 clubs; 2012-13 - 6 clubs; 2013/14 - 7 clubs; 2014/15 - 8 clubs; 2015/16 - 8 clubs; 2016/17 - 5 clubs; 2017/18 - 4 clubs; 2018/19 - 7 clubs; 2019/20 - 6 clubs; 2020/21 - 5 clubs; 2021/22 - 4 clubs; 2022/23 - 6 clubs.

== Champions and top goalscorers ==
Season	Competition	Champion	Runner-up	Top Scorer	Goals
2008–09	FSCG Trophy	Budućnost Podgorica	Ekonomist Nikšić		
2009–10	FSCG Trophy	Budućnost Podgorica	Ekonomist Nikšić		
2010–11	FSCG Trophy	Ekonomist Nikšić	Sport Uno Bijelo Polje		
2011–12	1. ŽFL	Ekonomist Nikšić	Budućnost Podgorica		
2012–13	1. ŽFL	Ekonomist Nikšić	Podgorica		
2013–14	1. ŽFL	Ekonomist Nikšić	Breznica Pljevlja	Slađana Bulatović	55
2014–15	1. ŽFL	Ekonomist Nikšić	Breznica Pljevlja		
2015–16	1. ŽFL	Breznica Pljevlja	Ekonomist Nikšić	Tamara Bojat (Serbia) Marijana Jankov	21
2016–17	1. ŽFL	Breznica Pljevlja	Ekonomist Nikšić	Tamara Bojat	24
2017–18	1. ŽFL	Breznica Pljevlja	Ekonomist Nikšić	Marijana Jankov	14
2018–19	1. ŽFL	Breznica Pljevlja	Budućnost Podgorica	Anđela Tošković	30
2019–20	1. ŽFL	Breznica Pljevlja	Budućnost Podgorica	Jelena Vujadinović	35
2020–21	1. ŽFL	Breznica Pljevlja	Budućnost Podgorica	Anđela Tošković	32
2021–22	1. ŽFL	Breznica Pljevlja	Danilovgrad	Minela Gačanica	21
2022–23	1. ŽFL	Breznica Pljevlja	Budućnost Podgorica	Milica Šebek	30
2023–24	1. ŽFL	Breznica Pljevlja	Budućnost Podgorica	Maša Tomašević	52
2024–25	1. ŽFL	Budućnost Podgorica	Breznica Pljevlja	Maša Tomašević	81

=== Titles by team ===
Club	Winners	Runners-up	Winning years
ŽFK Breznica Pljevlja	9	3	2015-16, 2016-17, 2017–18, 2018–19, 2019–20, 2020-21, 2021-22, 2022-23, 2023–24
ŽFK Ekonomist Nikšić	5	5	2010–11, 2011-12, 2012–13, 2013–14, 2014–15
ŽFK Budućnost Podgorica	3	5	2008-09, 2009-10, 2024-25
ŽFK Sport Uno Bijelo Polje	-	1	
ŽFK Podgorica	-	1	
ŽFK Danilovgrad	-	1	

== Montenegrin clubs in European competitions ==
Since the season 2012-13, champion of Montenegrin Women's League is playing in the UEFA Women's Champions League. In the period 2012-2015, the only Montenegrin representative was ŽFK Ekonomist. From season 2016-17 to 2023-24, Montenegro was represented in UEFA Champions League by ŽFK Breznica.
Below is a table with Montenegrin clubs' scores in UEFA competitions.

Team	Seasons	G	W	D	L	GD
ŽFK Breznica Pljevlja	9	19	2	4	13	22:69
ŽFK Ekonomist	4	12	0	2	10	8:45
ŽFK Budućnost Podgorica	1	2	1	0	1	3:3
OVERALL		33	3	6	24	33:117

As of the end of UEFA competitions 2025–26 season.

== See also ==
- Montenegrin Cup (women)
- Football Association of Montenegro
- Football in Montenegro
- Montenegrin First League
