= Montenegro women's national football team =

Women's national association football team representing Montenegro

Montenegro
- Association: Football Association of Montenegro (FSCG)
- Confederation: UEFA (Europe)
- Head coach: Mirko Maric
- Captain: Slađana Bulatović
- Most caps: Armisa Kuč (97)
- Top scorer: Armisa Kuč (43)
- Home stadium: Gradski stadion Stadion Mitar Mićo Goliš
- FIFA code: MNE
First colours	Second colours

FIFA ranking
- Current: 84 ▲2 (20 October 2026)
- Highest: 78 (December 2017)
- Lowest: 98 (July 2019; April 2021; August 2021)

First international
- Montenegro 2–3 Bosnia and Herzegovina (Bar, Montenegro; 13 March 2012)

Biggest win
- Montenegro 9–0 Faroe Islands (Podgorica, Montenegro; 1 December 2023)

Biggest defeat
- Spain 13–0 Montenegro (Las Rozas de Madrid, Spain; 15 September 2016)

The Montenegro women's national football team represents Montenegro in international women's football, and it is organised by the Football Association of Montenegro.

== History ==
Montenegrin women's team was founded in 2012, six years after Montenegro gained independence. It is organised and headed by Football Association of Montenegro. The team was founded four years after the establishing of first women's football competition in Montenegro.
With head coach Zoran Mijović, Montenegro played first match on 13 March 2012 in Bar, against Bosnia and Herzegovina (2:3). Two days later, Montenegro gained its first draw, also against Bosnia and Herzegovina (2:2).
Montenegro made its official competitive debut on 4 April 2013 in the 2015 World Cup qualification's preliminary round, drawing 3–3 against the Faroe Islands. Only two days later, Montenegro made first win in team's history, against Georgia – 2:0.
On that tournament, played in Vilnius, Montenegro made a big surprise, because they qualified for the final round of 2015 FIFA Women's World Cup qualification (UEFA).
In April 2015, on debut of new head coach Derviš Hadžiosmanović, Montenegro made biggest win in team's history, against Macedonia away – 7:0.
Montenegro participated in Euro 2017 qualifiers, but finished without a single point earned. In a qualifying game against Spain away, Montenegro recorded their biggest defeat in history (0:13)
Montenegro made its second appearance in World Cup Qualifiers during April 2017. In the World Cup 2019 qualifying tournament, hosted in the Faroe Islands, Montenegro finished third with one win and two defeats, but with a positive goal-difference (8:6). In theirlast game, Montenegro took their biggest victory of in their qualifying history against Luxembourg (7:1). In December 2023, they defeated the Faroe Islands 9–0 in the UEFA Women's Nations League, the team's biggest ever victory.

== Team image ==
=== Home stadium ===
The Montenegro women's national football team plays their home matches on the Gradski stadion or the Stadion Mitar Mićo Goliš.

== Results and fixtures ==
The following is a list of match results in the last 12 months, as well as any future matches that have been scheduled.

Legend

Win Draw Loss Fixture

=== 2025 ===
November 28 Friendly	Montenegro	1–0	Romania	Podgorica, Montenegro
14:00			Dokovic 18'	Stadium: Podgorica City Stadium

=== 2026 ===
3 March 2027 FIFA Women's World Cup qualification	Montenegro	1–2	Albania	Nikšić, Montenegro
14:00	Kuč 67'	Report (FIFA); Report (UEFA)	Doçi 70', 76'	Stadium: Gradski stadion Referee: Miriama Bočková (Slovakia)

7 March 2027 FIFA Women's World Cup qualification	Wales	6–1	Montenegro	Llanelli, Wales
16:30 (15:30 UTC)	Cain 6', 35'; Rowe 15'; Griffiths 17', 78'; Ingle 31'	Report (FIFA); Report (UEFA)	Kuč 51'	Stadium: Parc y Scarlets; Referee: Caroline Lanssens (Belgium)

14 April 2027 FIFA Women's World Cup qualification	Czech Republic	5–0	Montenegro	Chomutov, Czech Republic
17:30	Kalač 9' (o.g.); Černá 13'; Cahynová 30', 65'; Polášková 50'	Report (FIFA); Report (UEFA)		Stadium: Letní stadion Attendance: 1,221; Referee: Tatyana Sorokopudova (Kazakhstan)

18 April 2027 FIFA Women's World Cup qualification	Montenegro	1–4	Czech Republic	Nikšić, Montenegro
16:00	Bulatović 24' (pen.)	Report (FIFA); Report (UEFA)	Cahynová 7'; Khýrová 38'; Švíbková 67'; K. Dubcová 70' (pen.)	Stadium: Gradski stadion Attendance: 100; Referee: Louise Thompson (Northern Ireland)

5 June 2027 FIFA Women's World Cup qualification	Montenegro	1–1	Wales	Podgorica, Montenegro
18:00 CEST	Đoković 79'	Report	Cain 41' (pen.)	Stadium: Podgorica City Stadium; Attendance: 400; Referee: Henrikke Nervik (Norway)

9 June 2027 FIFA Women's World Cup qualification	Albania	5−2	Montenegro	Shkodër, Albania
19:00	Doçi 24' (pen.), 63'; F. Berisha 45+4'; G. Berisha 68'; Bajraktari 70'	Report (FIFA); Report (UEFA)	Dešić 20'; Djoković 45'	Stadium: Loro Boriçi Stadium; Referee: Emily Heaslip (England)

9 October Friendly	Montenegro	3–2	Bosnia and Herzegovina	Podgorica, Montenegro
13:00	Dešić 12'; Tomašević 26'; Kuč 90+2'	Report	Nikolić 23'; Ekić 75'	Stadium: DG Arena

13 October Friendly	Luxembourg	0–4	Montenegro	Rumelange, Luxembourg
19:00		Report	Kuč 15'; Dešić 17', 40'; Faria 49' (o.g.)	Stadium: Stade Municipal; Attendance: 605; Referee: Karoline Wacker (Germany)

2 December Friendly	Montenegro	v	Moldova	Podgorica, Montenegro
13:00		Report

5 December Friendly	Montenegro	v	Moldova	Podgorica, Montenegro
13:00		Report

== Head-to-head record ==
Below is a list of performances of Montenegro women's national football team against every single opponent.

Opponents' country	G	W	D	L	GD
Albania	7	2	1	7	13:17
Andorra	2	2	0	0	11:2
Austria	1	0	0	1	0:4
Azerbaijan	6	1	2	3	3:6
Belarus	2	0	0	2	2:10
Bosnia and Herzegovina	10	2	2	6	12:18
Croatia	5	1	2	2	8:8
Cyprus	2	2	0	0	4:0
Denmark	2	0	0	2	2:10
England	2	0	0	2	0:19
Estonia	2	0	1	1	2:3
Faroe Islands	6	3	1	2	20:8
Finland	4	0	0	4	1:14
Georgia	1	1	0	0	2:0
Germany	2	0	0	2	0:13
Greece	4	0	1	3	4:10
Lithuania	3	2	1	0	5:2
Luxembourg	1	1	0	0	7:1
Malta	4	2	0	2	4:4
Moldova	4	3	0	1	14:3
Northern Ireland	2	0	1	1	1:3
North Macedonia	4	3	0	1	15:5
Portugal	2	0	0	2	1:9
Republic of Ireland	4	0	0	4	0:19
Romania	1	1	0	0	1:0
Serbia	1	0	0	1	0:4
Slovenia	2	0	0	2	0:9
Spain	2	0	0	2	0:20
Turkey	3	0	0	3	3:9
Ukraine	4	0	0	4	3:16
Wales	3	0	0	3	1:13
OVERALL	98	26	12	60	139:240

Last update: April 11, 2026.

== Coaching staff ==
=== Current coaching staff ===
Updated as 14/12/2025

Position	Name	Ref.
Head coach	Mirko Marić	FSCG
First assistant coach and analyst	Ivan Tatar	FSCG
Assistant coach	Jadranka Pavićević	FSCG
Goalkeeping coach	Fuad Osmanagić	FSCG
Doctor	Marinko Pauović	FSCG
Physical therapists	Sanja Jakić; Ivana Pušonja	FSCG

=== Manager history ===
First head coach in the history of Montenegrin women's team was Zoran Mijović. He led team from 2012 to 2014.
At the beginning of 2015, as a new head coach was named Derviš Hadžiosmanović.

Manager	Career	Played	Won	Draw	Lost	GF	GA
(Montenegro) Zoran Mijović	2012–2015	17	1	3	13	21	70
(Montenegro) Derviš Hadžiosmanović	2015–2017	17	4	1	12	31	67
(Montenegro) Mirko Marić	2018–202?	24	4	3	17	20	60
(Montenegro) ženske seniorske	202?–present						

== Players ==
=== Current squad ===
The following players were called up for the 2027 FIFA Women's World Cup qualification matches against Wales and Albania on 5 and 9 June 2026, respectively.

Caps and goals correct as of 9 June 2026, after the match against Albania.

No.	Pos.	Player	Date of birth (age)	Caps	Goals	Club
1	GK	Ajša Kalač	11 September 2005 (age 21)	13	0	(Football Association of Slovenia) Olimpija Ljubljana
12	GK	Anastasija Krstović	21 July 2003 (age 23)	38	0	(Hungarian Football Federation) Szent Mihalj
13	GK	Ilda Orahovac	6 May 2010 (age 16)	0	0	(Football Association of Montenegro) ŽFK Gorica
2	DF	Tanja Malesija	2 October 2005 (age 21)	11	0	(Hungarian Football Federation) Budaroši
3	DF	Aleksandra Popović	3 May 1999 (age 27)	74	1	(Croatian Football Federation) ŽNK Agram
4	DF	Maja Šaranović	11 November 1999 (age 27)	65	2	(Football Association of Montenegro) ŽFK Budućnost Podgorica
6	DF	Ivana Boričić	26 May 2005 (age 21)	15	0	(Hungarian Football Federation) Ujpest
14	DF	Jovana Sarić	27 September 2003 (age 23)	24	0	(Football Association of Montenegro) ŽFK Ekonomist
15	DF	Helena Božić	14 February 1997 (age 29)	77	3	(Russian Football Union) Dynamo Moscow
17	DF	Darija Đukić	11 January 1996 (age 30)	78	1	(Turkish Football Federation) Fatih Vatan
19	DF	Nađa Stanović	10 September 1999 (age 27)	47	4	(Football Association of the Czech Republic) Slavia Prague
7	MF	Slađana Bulatović	4 May 1994 (age 32)	92	31	(Turkish Football Federation) Fomget GSK
8	MF	Jasna Đoković	29 October 1991 (age 35)	89	17	(Croatian Football Federation) ŽNK Agram
16	MF	Katarina Čađenović	5 July 2006 (age 20)	8	0	(Football Association of Bosnia and Herzegovina) SFK Sarajevo
18	MF	Slavica Krstevska	3 January 2007 (age 19)	0	0	(Norwegian Football Federation) Molde
20	MF	Nađa Đurđevac	25 August 2002 (age 24)	19	1	(Hungarian Football Federation) Szent Mihalj
21	MF	Andrea Janjušević	23 December 2003 (age 22)	31	0	(Football Association of Bosnia and Herzegovina) Emina 2016
5	FW	Tatjana Osmajić	20 February 2006 (age 20)	8	0	(Football Association of Serbia) TSC Bačka Topola
9	FW	Medina Dešić	15 September 1993 (age 33)	42	12	(German Football Association) Werder Bremen
10	FW	Nađa Doknić	8 October 2007 (age 19)	0	0	(Football Association of Montenegro) ŽFK Ekonomist Nikšić
11	FW	Armisa Kuč (captain)	11 April 1992 (age 34)	97	43	(Turkish Football Federation) ABB Fomget
22	FW	Maša Tomašević	25 July 2007 (age 19)	22	2	(Italian Football Federation) Inter
23	FW	Anđela Tošković	19 August 2004 (age 22)	28	3	(Football Association of Serbia) Crvena Zvezda

=== Recent call-ups ===
The following players have also been called up to the squad within the past 12 months.

Pos.	Player	Date of birth (age)	Caps	Goals	Club	Latest call-up
GK	Jovana Žugić	15 September 2006 (age 20)	1	0	(Bosnia and Herzegovina) Leotar Trebinje	v. Romania,28 November 2025
MF	Jelena Karličić ^{PRE}	5 October 2002 (age 24)	68	3	(Turkey) Fatih Vatan	v. Wales,5 June 2026
MF	Sara Simonović	31 March 2004 (age 22)	9	0	(Czech Republic) Szent Mihalj	v. Lithuania,18 April 2026
MF	Svetlana Bečić	18 June 2005 (age 21)	3	0	(Serbia) TSC Bačka Topola	v. Lithuania,18 April 2026
MF	Selma Ličina	8 May 2001 (age 25)	5	0	(Germany) 1. FC Nürnberg	v. Wales,7 March 2026
MF	Anastasija Rakočević	12 March 2006 (age 20)	0	0	(Serbia) Radnički Kragujevac	v. Romania,28 November 2025
FW	Jelena Petrović	28 April 2003 (age 23)	12	1	(Bosnia and Herzegovina) SFK Sarajevo	v. Lithuania,18 April 2026
Notes: ^{INJ} = Withdrew due to injury; ^{PRE} = Preliminary squad; ^{RET} = Retired from the national team; ^{WD} = Withdrew due to non-injury issue

== Records ==
As of 9 June 2026

Players in bold are still active with the national team.

=== Most capped players ===
#	Player	Career	Caps	Goals
1	Armisa Kuč	2012–present	97	43
2	Slađana Bulatović	2012–present	92	31
3	Jasna Đoković	2012–present	89	17
4	Darija Đukić	2013–present	78	1
5	Helena Božić	2015–present	77	3
6	Aleksandra Popović	2016–present	74	1
7	Jelena Karličić	2018–present	68	3
8	Maja Šaranović	2016–present	65	2
9	Tatjana Đurković	2013–present	58	0
10	Nađa Stanović	2018–present	47	4

=== Top goalscorers ===
Rank	Player	Career	Goals	Caps	Avg.
1	**Armisa Kuč**	2012–present	43	97	0.44
2	**Slađana Bulatović**	2012–present	31	92	0.34
3	**Jasna Đoković**	2012–present	17	89	0.19
4	Marija Vukčević	2012–2020	12	31	0.39
4	**Medina Dešić**	2020–present	12	42	0.29
6	**Jelena Vujadinović**	2017–present	6	42	0.14
7	**Nađa Stanović**	2018–present	4	47	0.09
8	**Anđela Tošković**	2020–present	3	28	0.11
8	**Jelena Karličić**	2018–present	3	68	0.04
8	**Helena Božić**	2015–present	3	77	0.04

== Competitive record ==
Since its foundation, Montenegro women's national football team played in two qualification rounds for big tournaments so far. On both occasions, Montenegro failed to qualify.

=== FIFA Women's World Cup ===
FIFA Women's World Cup record									Qualification record					
Year	Round	Position	Pld	W	D	L	GF	GA	Pld	W	D	L	GF	GA
(China) 1991	Part of FR Yugoslavia								Part of FR Yugoslavia					
(Sweden) 1995	Part of FR Yugoslavia								Part of FR Yugoslavia					
(United States) 1999	Part of FR Yugoslavia								Part of FR Yugoslavia					
(United States) 2003	Part of Serbia and Montenegro								Part of Serbia and Montenegro					
(China) 2007	Did not enter								Did not enter					
(Germany) 2011	Did not enter								Did not enter					
(Canada) 2015	Did not qualify								13	1	2	10	12	57
(France) 2019	Did not qualify								3	1	0	2	8	6
(Australia) (New Zealand) 2023	Did not qualify								8	3	0	5	9	17
(Brazil) 2027	To be determined								To be determined					
(Costa Rica) (Jamaica) (Mexico) (United States) 2031	To be determined								To be determined					
(United Kingdom) 2035	To be determined								To be determined					
Total	0/8								24	5	2	17	29	80

=== UEFA Women's Championship ===
UEFA Women's Championship record									Qualification record							
Year	Round	Position	Pld	W	D	L	GF	GA	Pld	W	D	L	GF	GA	P/R	Rnk
(England) (Italy) (Norway) (Sweden) 1984	Part of Yugoslavia								Part of Yugoslavia							
(Norway) 1987	Part of Yugoslavia								Part of Yugoslavia							
(West Germany) 1989	Part of Yugoslavia								Part of Yugoslavia							
(Denmark) 1991	Part of Yugoslavia								Part of Yugoslavia							
(Italy) 1993	Part of FR Yugoslavia								Part of FR Yugoslavia							
(England) (Germany) (Norway) (Sweden) 1995	Part of FR Yugoslavia								Part of FR Yugoslavia							
(Norway) (Sweden) 1997	Part of FR Yugoslavia								Part of FR Yugoslavia							
(Germany) 2001	Part of FR Yugoslavia								Part of FR Yugoslavia							
(England) 2005	Part of Serbia and Montenegro								Part of Serbia and Montenegro							
(Finland) 2009	Did not enter								Did not enter							
(Sweden) 2013	Did not enter								Did not enter							
(Netherlands) 2017	Did not qualify								8	0	0	8	2	51	–	
(England) 2022	Did not qualify								8	0	0	8	2	28	–	
(Switzerland) 2025	Did not qualify								8	3	1	4	21	16	(Note: From Euro 2025 onwards a new qualifying format was introduced, linked to the Women's Nations League where teams are divided into leagues with promotion/relegation between the leagues at the end of each cycle.)	39th
(Germany) 2029	To be determined								To be determined							
Total	–	0/5	–	–	–	–	–	–	24	3	1	20	25	95	39th	

=== UEFA Women's Nations League ===
UEFA Women's Nations League record
Year	League	Group	Pos	Pld	W	D	L	GF	GA	P/R	Rnk
2023–24	C	3	2nd	8	4	1	3	15	7	*	39th
2025	C	4	To be determined								
Total				8	4	1	3	15	7	39th	

▲	Promoted at end of season
Same position	No movement at end of season
▼	Relegated at end of season
*	Participated in promotion/relegation play-offs

== See also ==
- Sport in Montenegro
  - Football in Montenegro
    - Women's football in Montenegro
- Football Association of Montenegro
- List of official matches of the Montenegro women's national football team
- Montenegrin Women's League
- Montenegrin Cup (women)
