= UEFA Women's Euro 2005 squads =

Association football tournament squads

This article lists all the confirmed national football squads for the UEFA Women's Euro 2005.

Players marked (c) were named as captain for their national squad.

== Group A ==
=== Denmark ===
Head coach: (Denmark) Peter Bonde

No.	Pos.	Player	Date of birth (age)	Caps	Goals	Club
1	GK	Tine Cederkvist	21 March 1979 (aged 26)			(Danish Football Association) Brøndby IF
2	DF	Bettina Falk	31 March 1981 (aged 24)			(Danish Football Association) Brøndby IF
3	DF	Katrine Pedersen (c)	13 April 1977 (aged 28)			(Norwegian Football Federation) IF Fløya
4	DF	Gitte Andersen	28 April 1977 (aged 28)			(Danish Football Association) Brøndby IF
5	DF	Mariann Gajhede Knudsen	16 November 1984 (aged 20)			(Danish Football Association) Fortuna Hjørring
6	MF	Louise Hansen	4 May 1975 (aged 30)			(German Football Association) FFC Frankfurt
7	MF	Cathrine Sørensen	14 June 1978 (aged 26)			(Danish Football Association) Brøndby IF
8	FW	Stine Kjær Jensen	15 October 1979 (aged 25)			(Danish Football Association) Brøndby IF
9	FW	Lene Jensen	17 March 1976 (aged 29)			(Danish Football Association) IK Skovbakken
10	MF	Anne Dot Eggers Nielsen	6 November 1975 (aged 29)			(Danish Football Association) Brøndby IF
11	FW	Merete Pedersen	30 June 1973 (aged 31)			(Italian Football Federation) Torres Calcio Femminile
12	DF	Dorte Dalum Jensen	3 July 1978 (aged 26)			(Norwegian Football Federation) Asker Fotball
13	FW	Johanna Rasmussen	2 July 1983 (aged 21)			(Danish Football Association) Fortuna Hjørring
14	MF	Cecilie Pedersen	19 March 1983 (aged 22)			(Danish Football Association) Brøndby IF
15	FW	Tanja Mejer Christensen	22 March 1985 (aged 20)			(Danish Football Association) Fortuna Hjørring
16	GK	Mette Bjerg	24 February 1976 (aged 29)			(Danish Football Association) Horsens SIK
17	FW	Nanna Mølbach Johansen	19 November 1986 (aged 18)			(Danish Football Association) IK Skovbakken
18	DF	Mia Olsen	15 October 1981 (aged 23)			(Danish Football Association) Brøndby IF
19	MF	Helle Nielsen	17 February 1982 (aged 23)			(Danish Football Association) Vejle BK
20	GK	Stina Lykke Petersen	9 February 1986 (aged 19)			(Danish Football Association) Odense BK

=== England ===
Head coach: (England) Hope Powell

No.	Pos.	Player	Date of birth (age)	Caps	Goals	Club
1	GK	Jo Fletcher	31 December 1980 (aged 24)			(The Football Association) Birmingham City
2	DF	Alex Scott	14 October 1984 (aged 20)			(The Football Association) Birmingham City
3	DF	Rachel Unitt	5 June 1982 (aged 23)			(The Football Association) Everton
4	MF	Katie Chapman	15 June 1982 (aged 22)			(The Football Association) Charlton Athletic
5	DF	Faye White (c)	2 February 1978 (aged 27)			(The Football Association) Arsenal
6	DF	Mary Phillip	14 March 1977 (aged 28)			(The Football Association) Arsenal
7	FW	Jody Handley	12 March 1979 (aged 26)			(The Football Association) Everton
8	MF	Fara Williams	25 January 1984 (aged 21)			(The Football Association) Everton
9	FW	Amanda Barr	2 May 1982 (aged 23)			(The Football Association) Birmingham City
10	MF	Emily Westwood	5 April 1984 (aged 21)			(The Football Association) Wolves
11	FW	Rachel Yankey	1 November 1979 (aged 25)			(The Football Association) Birmingham City
12	MF	Kelly Smith	29 October 1978 (aged 26)			(The Football Association) Arsenal
13	GK	Rachel Brown	2 July 1980 (aged 24)			(The Football Association) Everton
14	FW	Karen Carney	1 August 1987 (aged 17)			(The Football Association) Birmingham City
15	DF	Casey Stoney	13 May 1982 (aged 23)			(The Football Association) Charlton Athletic
16	MF	Vicky Exley	22 October 1975 (aged 29)			(The Football Association) Doncaster Rovers Belles
17	MF	Anita Asante	27 April 1985 (aged 20)			(The Football Association) Arsenal
18	FW	Eniola Aluko	21 February 1987 (aged 18)			(The Football Association) Birmingham City
19	MF	Lindsay Johnson	8 May 1980 (aged 25)			(The Football Association) Everton
20	GK	Leanne Hall	19 May 1980 (aged 25)			(The Football Association) Fulham

=== Finland ===
Head coach: (Finland) Michael Käld

No.	Pos.	Player	Date of birth (age)	Caps	Goals	Club
1	GK	Satu Kunnas	3 September 1977 (aged 27)			(Football Association of Finland) FC United
2	DF	Petra Vaelma	11 May 1982 (aged 23)			(Football Association of Finland) FC United
3	MF	Jessica Julin	6 December 1978 (aged 26)			(Swedish Football Association) Umeå IK
4	DF	Sanna Valkonen (c)	12 December 1977 (aged 27)			(Swedish Football Association) Umeå IK
5	DF	Tiina Salmén	3 August 1978 (aged 26)			(Football Association of Finland) HJK Helsinki
6	DF	Evelina Sarapää	29 September 1976 (aged 28)			(Football Association of Finland) HJK Helsinki
7	MF	Anne Mäkinen	1 February 1976 (aged 29)			(Swedish Football Association) Umeå IK
8	MF	Minna Mustonen	26 July 1977 (aged 27)			(Football Association of Finland) FC United
9	FW	Laura Kalmari	27 May 1979 (aged 26)			(Swedish Football Association) Djurgården/Älvsjö
10	MF	Anna-Kaisa Rantanen	10 February 1978 (aged 27)			(Swedish Football Association) Linköpings FC
11	FW	Heidi Kackur	31 October 1978 (aged 26)			(Swedish Football Association) Göteborgs FC
12	GK	Virva Junkkari	14 October 1977 (aged 27)			(Football Association of Finland) HJK Helsinki
13	FW	Jessica Thorn	6 December 1981 (aged 23)			(Football Association of Finland) HJK Helsinki
14	DF	Heidi Ahonen	25 March 1984 (aged 21)			(Football Association of Finland) FC Espoo
15	MF	Sanna Malaska	6 April 1983 (aged 22)			(Football Association of Finland) HJK Helsinki
16	DF	Terhi Uusi-Luomalahti	20 February 1974 (aged 31)			(Football Association of Finland) FC Espoo
17	FW	Linda Lindqvist	3 January 1980 (aged 25)			(Football Association of Finland) FC Espoo
18	FW	Sanna Talonen	15 June 1984 (aged 20)			(Football Association of Finland) FC Honka
19	FW	Heidi Lindström	15 November 1981 (aged 23)			(Football Association of Finland) HJK Helsinki
20	GK	Noora Matikainen	1 September 1980 (aged 24)			(Football Association of Finland) FC Espoo

=== Sweden ===
Head coach: (Sweden) Marika Domanski Lyfors

The final squad was announced by Marika Domanski Lyfors.

No.	Pos.	Player	Date of birth (age)	Caps	Goals	Club
1	GK	Caroline Jönsson	22 November 1977 (aged 27)	63	0	(Swedish Football Association) Malmö FF
2	DF	Karolina Westberg	16 May 1978 (aged 27)	108	0	(Swedish Football Association) Umeå IK
3	DF	Jane Törnqvist	9 May 1975 (aged 30)	102	11	(Swedish Football Association) Djurgården/Älvsjö
4	DF	Hanna Marklund	26 November 1977 (aged 27)	88	5	(Swedish Football Association) Sunnanå SK
5	DF	Kristin Bengtsson	12 January 1970 (aged 35)	150	14	(Swedish Football Association) Djurgården/Älvsjö
6	MF	Malin Moström	1 August 1975 (aged 29)	97	18	(Swedish Football Association) Umeå IK
7	DF	Sara Larsson	13 May 1975 (aged 30)	54	5	(Swedish Football Association) Linköpings FC
8	MF	Frida Östberg	10 December 1977 (aged 27)	35	2	(Swedish Football Association) Umeå IK
9	MF	Malin Andersson (c)	4 May 1973 (aged 32)	149	38	(Swedish Football Association) Malmö FF
10	FW	Hanna Ljungberg	8 January 1979 (aged 26)	106	57	(Swedish Football Association) Umeå IK
11	FW	Victoria Svensson	18 May 1975 (aged 30)	108	40	(Swedish Football Association) Djurgården/Älvsjö
12	GK	Hedvig Lindahl	28 April 1983 (aged 22)	11	0	(Swedish Football Association) Linköpings FC
13	FW	Lotta Schelin	27 February 1984 (aged 21)	15	0	(Swedish Football Association) Kopparbergs/Göteborg FC
14	MF	Maria Karlsson	14 May 1983 (aged 22)	6	0	(Swedish Football Association) Linköpings FC
15	MF	Therese Sjögran	8 April 1977 (aged 28)	86	6	(Swedish Football Association) Malmö FF
16	MF	Caroline Seger	19 March 1985 (aged 20)	5	1	(Swedish Football Association) Linköpings FC
17	MF	Anna Sjöström	23 April 1977 (aged 28)	51	4	(Swedish Football Association) Umeå IK
18	GK	Maja Åström	14 December 1982 (aged 22)	1	0	(Swedish Football Association) Djurgården/Älvsjö
19	DF	Anna Paulson	29 February 1984 (aged 21)	1	0	(Swedish Football Association) Umeå IK
20	FW	Josefine Öqvist	23 July 1985 (aged 19)	25	5	(Swedish Football Association) Linköpings FC

Sweden caps and goals based on compilation of match reports at https://www.svenskfotboll.se/landslag/dam/landskamper-2001-2010/

== Group B ==
=== France ===
Head coach: (France) Élisabeth Loisel

No.	Pos.	Player	Date of birth (age)	Caps	Goals	Club
1	GK	Sandrine Capy	19 January 1969 (aged 36)			(French Football Federation) Juvisy
2	DF	Sabrina Viguier	4 January 1981 (aged 24)			(French Football Federation) Toulouse FC
3	DF	Peggy Provost	19 September 1977 (aged 27)			(French Football Federation) Juvisy
4	DF	Laura Georges	20 August 1984 (aged 20)			(United States Soccer Federation) Boston College Eagles
5	DF	Corinne Diacre	4 August 1974 (aged 30)			(French Football Federation) Soyaux
6	MF	Sandrine Soubeyrand	16 August 1973 (aged 31)			(French Football Federation) Juvisy
7	MF	Stéphanie Mugneret-Béghé	22 March 1974 (aged 31)			(French Football Federation) Juvisy
8	MF	Sonia Bompastor (c)	8 June 1980 (aged 24)			(French Football Federation) Montpellier
9	FW	Marinette Pichon	26 November 1975 (aged 29)			(French Football Federation) Juvisy
10	FW	Candie Herbert	4 June 1977 (aged 28)			(French Football Federation) Soyaux
11	DF	Sandrine Dusang	23 March 1984 (aged 21)			(French Football Federation) Olympique Lyonnais
12	MF	Camille Abily	5 December 1984 (aged 20)			(French Football Federation) Montpellier
13	DF	Anne-Laure Casseleux	13 January 1984 (aged 21)			(French Football Federation) Soyaux
14	MF	Louisa Necib	23 January 1987 (aged 18)			(French Football Federation) CNFE Clairefontaine
15	FW	Elodie Thomis	13 August 1986 (aged 18)			(French Football Federation) CNFE Clairefontaine
16	GK	Céline Deville	24 January 1982 (aged 23)			(French Football Federation) Montpellier
17	MF	Marie-Ange Kramo	20 February 1979 (aged 26)			(French Football Federation) Toulouse FC
18	FW	Hoda Lattaf	24 September 1985 (aged 19)			(French Football Federation) Montpellier
19	MF	Elise Bussaglia	29 February 1984 (aged 21)			(French Football Federation) Juvisy
20	GK	Sarah Bouhaddi	17 October 1986 (aged 18)			(French Football Federation) CNFE Clairefontaine

=== Germany ===
Head coach: (Germany) Tina Theune-Meyer

No.	Pos.	Player	Date of birth (age)	Caps	Goals	Club
1	GK	Silke Rottenberg	25 January 1972 (aged 33)			(German Football Association) FCR 2001 Duisburg
2	DF	Kerstin Stegemann	29 September 1977 (aged 27)			(German Football Association) FFC Heike Rheine
3	DF	Sonja Fuss	5 November 1978 (aged 26)			(German Football Association) 1. FFC Turbine Potsdam
4	DF	Stephanie Jones	22 December 1972 (aged 32)			(German Football Association) 1. FFC Frankfurt
5	DF	Sarah Günther	25 January 1983 (aged 22)			(German Football Association) Hamburger SV
6	FW	Inka Grings	31 October 1978 (aged 26)			(German Football Association) FCR 2001 Duisburg
7	MF	Pia Wunderlich	26 January 1975 (aged 30)			(German Football Association) 1. FFC Frankfurt
8	FW	Sandra Smisek	3 July 1977 (aged 27)			(German Football Association) FSV Frankfurt
9	FW	Birgit Prinz (c)	25 October 1977 (aged 27)			(German Football Association) 1. FFC Frankfurt
10	MF	Renate Lingor	11 October 1975 (aged 29)			(German Football Association) 1. FFC Frankfurt
11	FW	Anja Mittag	16 May 1985 (aged 20)			(German Football Association) 1. FFC Turbine Potsdam
12	GK	Ursula Holl	26 June 1982 (aged 22)			(German Football Association) FSV Frankfurt
13	DF	Sandra Minnert	7 April 1973 (aged 32)			(German Football Association) SC 07 Bad Neuenahr
14	MF	Britta Carlson	3 March 1978 (aged 27)			(German Football Association) 1. FFC Turbine Potsdam
15	GK	Nadine Angerer	10 November 1978 (aged 26)			(German Football Association) 1. FFC Turbine Potsdam
16	MF	Conny Pohlers	16 November 1978 (aged 26)			(German Football Association) 1. FFC Turbine Potsdam
17	DF	Ariane Hingst	25 July 1979 (aged 25)			(German Football Association) 1. FFC Turbine Potsdam
18	MF	Kerstin Garefrekes	4 September 1979 (aged 25)			(German Football Association) 1. FFC Frankfurt
19	MF	Navina Omilade	3 November 1981 (aged 23)			(German Football Association) 1. FFC Turbine Potsdam
20	FW	Petra Wimbersky	9 November 1982 (aged 22)			(German Football Association) 1. FFC Turbine Potsdam

=== Italy ===
Head coach: (Italy) Carolina Morace

No.	Pos.	Player	Date of birth (age)	Caps	Goals	Club
1	GK	Carla Brunozzi	20 April 1976 (aged 29)			(Italian Football Federation) Vigor Senigallia
2	MF	Giulia Domenichetti	29 April 1984 (aged 21)			(Italian Football Federation) Torres CF
3	MF	Tatiana Zorri	19 October 1977 (aged 27)			(Italian Football Federation) Torino
4	MF	Sara Di Filippo	29 June 1982 (aged 22)			(Italian Football Federation) Tavagnacco
5	DF	Elisabetta Tona	22 January 1984 (aged 21)			(Italian Football Federation) Torres CF
6	DF	Giulia Perelli	23 April 1982 (aged 23)			(Italian Football Federation) Atletico Oristano
7	FW	Chiara Gazzoli	21 August 1978 (aged 26)			(Italian Football Federation) Torres CF
8	MF	Damiana Deiana	26 June 1970 (aged 34)			(Italian Football Federation) Torino
9	FW	Patrizia Panico (c)	8 February 1975 (aged 30)			(Italian Football Federation) Torino
10	MF	Elisa Camporese	16 March 1984 (aged 21)			(Italian Football Federation) Bardolino CF
11	FW	Ilaria Pasqui	13 December 1979 (aged 25)			(Italian Football Federation) Bardolino CF
12	GK	Michela Cupido	2 May 1978 (aged 27)			(Italian Football Federation) Agliana
13	DF	Gioia Masia	22 January 1977 (aged 28)			(Italian Football Federation) Torres CF
14	DF	Valentina Lanzieri	21 June 1984 (aged 20)			(Italian Football Federation) Torino
15	DF	Viviana Schiavi	1 September 1982 (aged 22)			(Italian Football Federation) Fiammamonza
16	DF	Elena Ficarelli	16 July 1980 (aged 24)			(Italian Football Federation) Bardolino CF
17	FW	Melania Gabbiadini	18 August 1983 (aged 21)			(Italian Football Federation) Bardolino CF
18	FW	Pamela Conti	4 April 1982 (aged 23)			(Italian Football Federation) Torres CF
19	MF	Valentina Boni	14 March 1983 (aged 22)			(Italian Football Federation) Bardolino CF
20	GK	Chiara Marchitelli	4 May 1985 (aged 20)			(Italian Football Federation) Atletico Oristano

=== Norway ===
Head coach: (Norway) Bjarne Berntsen

No.	Pos.	Player	Date of birth (age)	Caps	Goals	Club
1	GK	Bente Nordby	23 July 1974 (aged 30)			(Norwegian Football Federation) Asker FK
2	DF	Ane Stangeland (c)	29 April 1984 (aged 21)			(Norwegian Football Federation) Klepp
3	DF	Gunhild Følstad	2 June 1980 (aged 25)			(Norwegian Football Federation) Trondheims-Ørn
4	DF	Ingvild Stensland	3 November 1981 (aged 23)			(Norwegian Football Federation) Kolbotn
5	DF	Siri Nordby	4 August 1978 (aged 26)			(Norwegian Football Federation) Røa
6	DF	Marit Christensen	11 December 1980 (aged 24)			(Norwegian Football Federation) Røa
7	MF	Trine Rønning	14 June 1982 (aged 22)			(Norwegian Football Federation) Kolbotn
8	MF	Solveig Gulbrandsen	12 January 1981 (aged 24)			(Norwegian Football Federation) Kolbotn
9	FW	Isabell Herlovsen	23 June 1988 (aged 16)			(Norwegian Football Federation) Kolbotn
10	MF	Unni Lehn	7 June 1977 (aged 27)			(Norwegian Football Federation) Trondheims-Ørn
11	DF	Maritha Kaufmann	2 January 1981 (aged 24)			(Norwegian Football Federation) Team Strømmen
12	GK	Ingrid Hjelmseth	10 April 1980 (aged 25)			(Norwegian Football Federation) Trondheims-Ørn
13	GK	Christine Colombo Nilsen	30 April 1982 (aged 23)			(Norwegian Football Federation) Kolbotn
14	FW	Dagny Mellgren	19 June 1976 (aged 28)			(Norwegian Football Federation) Klepp
15	DF	Tone Heimlund	24 May 1985 (aged 20)			(Norwegian Football Federation) Fløya
16	FW	Kristin Blystad-Bjerke	7 July 1980 (aged 24)			(Norwegian Football Federation) Kolbotn
17	DF	Marianne Paulsen	20 May 1985 (aged 20)			(Norwegian Football Federation) Trondheims-Ørn
18	MF	Marie Knutsen	31 August 1982 (aged 22)			(Norwegian Football Federation) Kattem
19	FW	Stine Frantzen	29 January 1984 (aged 21)			(Norwegian Football Federation) Fløya
20	FW	Lise Klaveness	19 April 1981 (aged 24)			(Norwegian Football Federation) Asker FK
