= 2007 FIFA Women's World Cup qualification (UEFA) =

Football tournament qualification stage

In the UEFA qualification for the 2007 FIFA Women's World Cup, the 25 teams belonging to the First Category of European women's football were drawn into five groups, from which the group winners qualified for the World Cup finals. The qualifiers begun on 9 July 2005 and concluded on 30 September 2006, with five teams qualified: Denmark, England, Germany, Norway and Sweden. Of these, the latter three had qualified for the 2003 World Cup, while Denmark and England qualified over France (second in England's group) and Russia (second in Germany's group).

== First Category ==
=== Group 1 ===
Team	Pts	Pld	W	D	L	GF	GA	GD	
Norway	22	8	7	1	0	22	3	+19	Qualified for 2007 FIFA Women's World Cup
Ukraine	16	8	5	1	2	20	11	+9	
Italy	15	8	5	0	3	25	6	+19	
Serbia and Montenegro	6	8	2	0	6	6	27	−21	
Greece	0	8	0	0	8	2	28	−26	

=== Match schedule & results ===
27 August 2005
15:30

Norway	4–1	Ukraine
Mellgren 28', 54' (pen.); Christensen 47'; Klaveness 58'	(Report)	Verezoubova 45'

Åråsen, Lillestrøm
Referee: Doneva-Hristova (Bulgaria)

24 September 2005
15:30

Serbia and Montenegro	0–4	Norway
	(Report)	S. Gulbrandsen 31', 86'; Rønning 55', 63'

Kolubara, Lazarevac
Referee: Damkova (Czech Republic)

24 September 2005
16:00

Italy	3–1	Ukraine
Zorri 20'; Panico 47'; Marsico 78'	(Report)	Zinchenko 8'

Brianteo, Monza
Referee: De Jong (Netherlands)

29 October 2005
15:00

Norway	1–0	Italy
Klaveness 60'	(Report)

Brann, Bergen
Referee: Toms (England)

29 October 2005
15:30

Greece	0–2	Serbia and Montenegro
	(Report)	Podovac 85', 91'

Doxa Drama
Referee: Dorcioman (Romania)

2 November 2005
14:30

Italy	6–0	Serbia and Montenegro
Boni 21', 29'; Panico 41', 85'; Marsico 75'; Zorri 83'	(Report)

Sesto al Reghena
Referee: Brohet (Belgium)

5 November 2005
13:00

Serbia and Montenegro	0–4	Ukraine
	(Report)	Zinchenko 34', 84'; Apanashenko 47'; Frisco 73'

Železnicar, Lajkovac
Referee: Gaal (Hungary)

9 November 2005
15:30

Greece	1–3	Ukraine
Papadopoulou 64'	(Report)	Korniyevets 13', 37'; Frisco 83'

Kavala Stadium
Referee: Schett (Austria)

25 March 2006
15:00

Greece	0–3	Norway
	(Report)	R. Gulbrandsen 2', 92+'; Lehn 81'

Georgios Kamaras, Athens
Referee: Frai (Germany)

29 March 2006
15:00

Italy	2–0	Greece
Zorri 38'; Greco 69'	(Report)

Comunale Rinascita, Aversa
Referee: Milanova Djaleva (Bulgaria)

15 April 2006
15:30

Serbia and Montenegro	3–1	Greece
Jovanovic 13'; Stojanovic 68', 79'	(Report)	Arvanitaki 26'

Železnicar, Lajkovac
Referee: McDermott (Rep. of Ireland)

22 April 2006
15:00

Greece	0–5	Italy
	(Report)	Panico 15' (pen.), 83', 86', 89'; Di Filippo 37'

Kesariani, Athens
Referee: Quintero Siles (Spain)

6 May 2006
17:00

Ukraine	2–1	Serbia and Montenegro
Frisco 35'; Pekur 81'	(Report)	Stojanovic 15'

Ukrajina, Lviv
Referee: Hänninen (Finland)

10 May 2006
18:00

Norway	3–0	Serbia and Montenegro
Lehn 11'; Stangeland 16'; Følstad 21'	(Report)

Storstadion, Sandefjord
Referee: Ionescu (Romania)

17 June 2006
19:00

Ukraine	2–1	Italy
Hodyreva 47'; Frisco 57'	(Report)	Marsico 75'

Illychivets, Mariupol
Referee: Palmqvist (Sweden)

20 June 2006
18:00

Norway	4–0	Greece
R. Gulbrandsen 14', 45'; Knutsen 59'; Giske 85'	(Report)

Halden stadion
Referee: Blahova (Czech Republic)

21 June 2006
17:00

Serbia and Montenegro	0–7	Italy
	(Report)	Zorri 4', 15'; Di Filippo 26'; Marsico 56', 63', 68'; Pini 73'

Stadium Voždovac
Referee: Beck (Germany)

23 June 2006
19:00

Ukraine	6–0	Greece
Frisco 17', 42' (pen.); Verezoubova 49', 58'; Soukhoroukova 51'; Pekur 86'	(Report)

Illychivets, Mariupol
Referee: Grigoryan (Armenia)

27 August 2006
17:00

Ukraine	1–1	Norway
Verezoubova 28'	(Report)	Lehn 45'

Ukrajina, Lviv
Referee: Toms (England)

23 September 2006
15:00

Italy	1–2	Norway
Panico 83'	(Report)	R. Gulbrandsen 60'; Knutsen 63'

Romeo Neri, Rimini
Referee: Gaal (Hungary)

=== Group 2 ===
Team	Pts	Pld	W	D	L	GF	GA	GD	
Sweden	22	8	7	1	0	32	6	+26	Qualified for 2007 FIFA Women's World Cup
Czech Republic	16	8	5	1	2	20	8	+12	
Iceland	13	8	4	1	3	18	12	+6	
Belarus	7	8	2	1	5	6	23	−17	
Portugal	0	8	0	0	8	4	31	−27	

=== Match schedule & results ===
21 August 2005
14:00

Iceland	3–0	Belarus
Lárusdóttir 31', 58'; M. L. Viðarsdóttir 56'	(Report)

Laugardalsvöllur, Reykjavík
Attendance: 500
Referee: Sinabova (Bulgaria)

27 August 2005
17:00

Belarus	1–1	Czech Republic
Tatarynova 73'	(Report)	Hejlova 76'

Darida Stadium, Minsk
Attendance: 800
Referee: Albon (Romania)

28 August 2005
17:00

Sweden	2–2	Iceland
Ljungberg 34'; Schelin 73'	(Report); SvFF Report (in Swedish)	A. Helgadóttir 49'; M. L. Viðarsdóttir 75'

Nobelstadion, Karlskoga
Referee: Steinhaus (Germany)

24 September 2005
15:30

Czech Republic	1–0	Iceland
Pěničková 8'	(Report)

Stadion SK Kravare
Referee: Skogvang (Norway)

24 September 2005
16:00

Sweden	6–0	Belarus
Ljungberg 15', 25', 90', 90+1'; Schelin 30'; Lundin 83'	(Report); SvFF Report (in Swedish)

Norrvalla, Skellefteå
Attendance: 5,000
Referee: McDermott (Rep. of Ireland)

1 November 2005
15:00

Portugal	1–4	Sweden
Fernandes 71'	(Report); SvFF Report (in Swedish)	Ljungberg 9', 53'; Sjöström 49'; Moström 92'

Alcochetense, Setúbal
Referee: Kuzmanovic (Serbia and Montenegro)

5 November 2005
15:00

Portugal	0–3	Czech Republic
	(Report)	Martinkova 15'; Chlumecka 38'; Pěničková 87'

Primero de Maio, Lisbon
Referee: Robin (France)

22 April 2006
16:00

Czech Republic	2–3	Sweden
Šcasná 4'; Mouchová 67'	(Report); SvFF Report (in Swedish)	Larsson 23'; Schelin 62', 69'

Františka Kloze, Kladno
Referee: Avdonchenko (Russia)

6 May 2006
17:00

Belarus	1–2	Iceland
Aniskoutsava 54'	(Report)	K. Jónsdóttir 27'; A. Helgadóttir 51'

Darida Stadium, Minsk
Attendance: 800
Referee: Monzul (Ukraine)

7 May 2006
13:00

Sweden	5–1	Portugal
Lundin 10', 64', 79'; Schelin 30'; Sjögran 72'	(Report); SvFF Report (in Swedish)	Fernandes 17'

Vångavallen, Trelleborg
Referee: Girard-Fautrel (France)

11 May 2006
16:00

Portugal	0–1	Belarus
	(Report)	Ryzhevich 11'

Estadio Municipal, Beja
Attendance: 1,500
Referee: Mitsi (Greece)

4 June 2006
16:30

Czech Republic	6–0	Portugal
Knavova 9'; Ščasná 16', 24'; Martínková 29'; Chlumecká 35'; Pěničková 46'	(Report)

Roudnice nad Labem
Referee: Brohet (Belgium)

18 June 2006
14:00

Belarus	0–6	Sweden
	(Report); SvFF Report (in Swedish)	Schelin 45'; Svensson 48', 82', 86'; Seger 52'; Öqvist 75'

Darida Stadium, Minsk
Attendance: 505
Referee: Robin (France)

18 June 2006
16:00

Iceland	3–0	Portugal
M. L. Viðarsdóttir 40', 90'; Samúelsdóttir 85'	(Report)

Laugardalsvöllur, Reykjavík
Referee: Svendsen (Denmark)

19 August 2006
16:00

Iceland	2–4	Czech Republic
Á. Helgadóttir 6'; M. L. Viðarsdóttir 35'	(Report)	Martínková 2'; Ščasná 37'; Mouchová 57'; K. Jónsdóttir 72' (o.g.)

Laugardalsvöllur, Reykjavík
Referee: Focic (Croatia)

26 August 2006
14:00

Iceland	0–4	Sweden
	(Report); SvFF Report (in Swedish)	Moström 13' (pen.); Thunebro 62'; Svensson 80'; Ljungberg 86'

Laugardalsvöllur, Reykjavík
Referee: Petignat (Switzerland)

27 August 2006
17:00

Czech Republic	3–0	Belarus
Ščasná 5'; Chlumecká 48'; Kladrubská 79'	(Report)

Městský stadion, Čelákovice
Referee: Olander (Estonia)

23 September 2006

Belarus	3–2	Portugal
Aniskoutsava 17', 20' (pen.); Tatarynova 34'	(Report)	Martins 5'; Azavedo 46'

Darida Stadium, Minsk
Referee: Muradova (Azerbaijan)

24 September 2006
15:00

Sweden	2–0	Czech Republic
Ljungberg 5', 30'	(Report); SvFF Report (in Swedish)

Värendsvallen, Växjö
Referee: De Toni (Italy)

28 September 2006
17:00

Portugal	0–6	Iceland
	(Report)	K. Jónsdóttir 9', 55'; M. L. Viðarsdóttir 21', 67', 79', 86'

Primero de Maio, Lisbon
Referee: Remy (France)

=== Group 3 ===
Team	Pts	Pld	W	D	L	GF	GA	GD	
Denmark	19	8	6	1	1	22	6	+16	Qualified for 2007 FIFA Women's World Cup
Finland	16	8	5	1	2	16	5	+11	
Spain	14	8	4	2	2	19	14	+5	
Poland	9	8	3	0	5	14	29	−15	
Belgium	0	8	0	0	8	8	25	−17	

=== Match schedule & results ===
27 August 2005
17:00

Poland	1–5	Denmark
Gawronska 74'	(Report)	M. Pedersen 8', 10', 39', 67'; Sørensen 13'

Stadion Miejski, Słupsk
Referee: Ulyanovskaya (Russia)

31 August 2005
19:00

Belgium	0–3	Finland
	(Report)	Kackur 3'; Kalmari 45'; Mustonen 64'

Sportcomplex de Singel, Strombeek
Referee: Rachel Cohen (Israel)

24 September 2005
15:00

Finland	3–1	Poland
Salmén 45'; Kalmari 69'; Talonen 84'	(Report)	Gawronska 68'

Hietalahti, Vaasa
Referee: Monzul (Ukraine)

25 September 2005
15:30

Denmark	3–0	Belgium
M. Pedersen 13', 24'; Eggers Nielsen 34'	(Report)

Farum Park
Referee: Blahova (Czech Republic)

29 September 2005
15:00

Poland	3–2	Spain
Rytwinska 49'; Gurrutxaga 53' (o.g.); Pozerska 61'	(Report)	del Rio 6', 40'

City Stadium, Kutno
Referee: Ionescu (Romania)

30 October 2005
14:00

Finland	0–1	Spain
	(Report)	Cabezón 34'

Olympiastadion, Helsinki
Referee: Beck (Germany)

30 October 2005
15:00

Belgium	2–3	Poland
Van Humbeeck 43'; Zeler 68'	(Report)	Gawronska 13'; Nazarczyk 31'; Otrebska 60'

Oud-Heverlee, Leuven
Referee: Ostervold (Norway)

5 November 2005
12:30

Spain	3–2	Belgium
Cabezón 2'; De Cock 91+'; Gimbert 92+'	(Report)	Maes 67'; Verelst 81'

Ciudad del futbol, Las Rozas de Madrid
Referee: Lale Orta (Turkey)

10 November 2005
17:00

Spain	2–2	Denmark
Vilanova 13'; Martín 31'	(Report)	Sørensen 18'; Rasmussen 52'

Ciudad del fútbol, Las Rozas de Madrid
Referee: Girard-Fautrel (France)

26 March 2006
15:00

Belgium	0–2	Denmark
	(Report)	M. Pedersen 63', 72'

Des Géants, Ath
Referee: Steinhaus (Germany)

30 March 2006
17:00

Spain	7–0	Poland
Martín 9', 28', 52', 63', 85'; Cabezón 32'; Azagra 54'	(Report)

El Montecillo, Aranda de Duero
Referee: Basimamovic (Croatia)

22 April 2006
15:00

Poland	1–5	Finland
Żelazko 55'	(Report)	Kalmari 23', 49', 74'; Talonen 27', 36'

Miejski, Jaworzno
Referee: Ihringova (Slovakia)

22 April 2006
19:00

Belgium	2–4	Spain
Maes 64'; Callebaut 75'	(Report)	Martín 5', 40'; Gurrutxaga 16' del Rio 29'

Joseph Marien, Brussels
Referee: Mamayeva (Russia)

27 April 2006
19:00

Denmark	5–0	Spain
M. Pedersen 50'; Pape 62' (pen.), 88'; Sørensen 68'; Rasmussen 75'	(Report)

Viborg Stadion
Referee: De Toni (Italy)

6 May 2006
14:00

Finland	3–0	Belgium
Kalmari 8', 18'; Sjölund 82'	(Report)

Ratina, Tampere
Referee: Ulyanovskaya (Russia)

7 May 2006
14:00

Denmark	3–1	Poland
M. Pedersen 40'; Pape 47'; Madsen 71'	(Report)	Zelazko 66'

Brøndby Stadium
Referee: Kuzmanovic (Serbia and Montenegro)

11 May 2006
21:00

Spain	0–0	Finland
	(Report)

Estadio Municipal Pozoblanco, Pozoblanco
Referee: Petignat (Switzerland)

26 August 2006
15:00

Finland	2–1	Denmark
Österberg Kalmari 26'; Mustonen 78'	(Report)	Sørensen 38'

Ratina, Tampere
Referee: Dorcioman (Romania)

23 September 2006
15:00

Poland	4–2	Belgium
Żelazko 35', 67'; Rytwińska 46'; Makowska 87' (pen.)	(Report)	Heiremans 26', 72'

City Stadium, Kutno
Referee: Bastos (Portugal)

27 September 2006
18:00

Denmark	1–0	Finland
Pape 56'	(Report)

Viborg Stadion
Referee: Beck (Germany)

=== Group 4 ===
Team	Pts	Pld	W	D	L	GF	GA	GD	
Germany	24	8	8	0	0	31	3	+28	Qualified for 2007 FIFA Women's World Cup
Russia	18	8	6	0	2	24	9	+15	
Scotland	8	8	2	2	4	4	20	−16	
Republic of Ireland	4	8	1	1	6	3	15	−12	
Switzerland	4	8	1	1	6	3	18	−15	

=== Match schedule & results ===
9 July 2005
15:00

Russia	5–1	Republic of Ireland
Kurochkina 2'; Zaitseva 33'; Boyle 35' (o.g.); Mokshanova 42'; Barbashina 48'	(Report)	O'Brien 70'

Moskvich, Moscow
Referee: Schett (Austria)

28 August 2005
15:00

Russia	6–0	Scotland
Morozova 13'; Barbashina 24'; Skotnikova 25'; Danilova 52'; Letyushova 82'; Savchenkova 84'	(Report)

Moskvich, Moscow
Referee: Svendsen (Denmark)

1 September 2005
19:30

Switzerland	0–2	Russia
	(Report)	Morozova 3'; Kurochkina 54'

Herti-Allmend, Zug
Referee: Arwedahl (Sweden)

25 September 2005
13:00

Germany	5–1	Russia
Lingor 6' (pen.); Grings 8'; Minnert 43'; Prinz 87'; Smisek 90'	(Report)	Komarova 60'

Leimbach, Siegen
Referee: Fodic (Croatia)

25 September 2005
14:00

Scotland	0–0	Republic of Ireland
	(Report)

McDiarmid Park, Perth
Referee: Spinelli (Italy)

20 October 2005
15:00

Germany	4–0	Scotland
Grings 24'; Stegemann 57'; Prinz 61', 78'	(Report)

Hans-Walter Wild Stadion, Bayreuth
Referee: Hänninen (Finland)

12 November 2005
17:00

Germany	4–0	Switzerland
Jones 10'; Carlson 20', 62'; Wimbersky 36'	(Report)

Donaustadion, Ulm
Referee: De Toni (Italy)

25 March 2006
17:00

Switzerland	2–0	Republic of Ireland
Dickenmann 23', 44'	(Report)

Gurzelen, Biel
Referee: Albon (Romania)

22 April 2006
17:00

Republic of Ireland	2–0	Switzerland
Grant 23'; O'Toole 90'	(Report)

Richmond Park, Dublin
Referee: Wnuk (Poland)

26 April 2006
19:00

Scotland	1–0	Switzerland
Grant 61'	(Report)

McDiarmid Park, Perth
Referee: Thörn (Sweden)

6 May 2006
19:00

Republic of Ireland	0–2	Scotland
	(Report)	Love 47'; Fleeting 81'

Richmond Park, Dublin
Referee: Cohen (Israel)

10 May 2006
16:00

Germany	1–0	Republic of Ireland
Wimbersky 3'	(Report)

Stadion der Freundschaft, Cottbus
Referee: Tvarijonaite (Lithuania)

24 May 2006
19:00

Scotland	0–4	Russia
	(Report)	Morozova; Kurochkina × 2 Savchenkova

McDiarmid Park, Perth

17 June 2006
19:00

Republic of Ireland	0–2	Russia
	(Report)	Kurochkina 17'; Barbashina 81'

Richmond Park, Dublin
Referee: Olander (Estonia)

26 August 2006
18:00

Switzerland	1–1	Scotland
Gailard 17' (pen.)	(Report)	Fleeting 71'

Schlossfeld, Willisau
Referee: Martinez (Spain)

26 August 2006
19:00

Republic of Ireland	0–3	Germany
	(Report)	Wimbersky 2'; Prinz 16'; Garefrekes 45'

Richmond Park, Dublin
Referee: Arwedahl (Sweden)

30 August 2006
16:00

Switzerland	0–6	Germany
	(Report)	Pohlers 1'; Prinz 57'; Wimbersky 73'; Lingor 78'; M. Müller 89'; Garefrekes 90+2'

Breite Stadion, Schaffhausen
Referee: Noëlle (France)

23 September 2006
14:00

Scotland	0–5	Germany
	(Report)	Prinz 26', 53'; Lingor 36'; Garefrekes 44'; Smisek 67'

McDiarmid Park, Perth
Referee: Basimamovic (Croatia)

23 September 2006
15:00

Russia	2–0	Switzerland
Kremleva 27' (pen.); Morozova 68'	(Report)

Moskvich, Moscow
Referee: Gordana Kuzmanovic (Serbia)

27 September 2006
19:30

Russia	2–3	Germany
Barbashina 83'; Kremleva 90'	(Report)	Smisek 32'; Garefrekes 36'; Prinz 45'

Eduard Streltsov Stadium, Moscow
Referee: Skogvang (Norway)

=== Group 5 ===
Team	Pts	Pld	W	D	L	GF	GA	GD	
England	20	8	6	2	0	29	2	+27	Qualified for 2007 FIFA Women's World Cup
France	17	8	5	2	1	15	4	+11	
Netherlands	15	8	5	0	3	15	7	+8	
Austria	4	8	1	1	6	7	19	−12	
Hungary	1	8	0	1	7	1	35	−34	

=== Match schedule & results ===
1 September 2005
19:30

Austria	1–4	England
Celouch 21'	(Report)	Williams 23' (pen.); K. Smith 35', 92+'; Barr 56'

Ertl Glas, Amstetten
Referee: Tvarijonaite (Lithuania)

24 September 2005
15:00

France	0–1	Netherlands
	(Report)	de Boer 65'

Jean-Bouin Stadium, Angers
Referee: Ödlund (Sweden)

24 September 2005
18:00

Hungary	0–3	Austria
	(Report)	Burger 10', 79'; Aigner 32'

Buk Stadium
Referee: Tosun (Turkey)

27 October 2005
13:30

Hungary	0–13	England
	(Report)	K. Smith 3', 43', 80'; Yankey 5'; Aluko 12', 50'; Scott 15', 38'; Chapman 30'; Williams 61', 88' (pen.); Potter 75'; Handley 79'

Tapolcia Stadium
Referee: Damkova (Czech Republic)

29 October 2005
16:00

Austria	0–1	Netherlands
	(Report)	Louwaars 32'

Franz Fekete Stadium, Kapfenberg
Referee: Olander (Estonia)

5 November 2005
16:00

Austria	1–3	France
Aigner 7' (pen.)	(Report)	Pichon 24'; Soubeyrand 42', 56'

Neue Sportanlage Langenrohr
Referee: Antonia Kokotou (Greece)

9 November 2005
19:00

France	2–0	Hungary
Soubeyrand 67'; Tonazzi 81'	(Report)

Les Allées, Blois
Referee: Basimamovic (Croatia)

17 November 2005
19:00

Netherlands	0–1	England
	(Report)	Williams 55' (pen.)

Oosterenk, Zwolle
Referee: Frai (Germany)

25 March 2006
15:00

Hungary	0–5	Netherlands
	(Report)	Louwaars 21', 61'; Smith 33'; Delies 41'; Hoogendijk 55'

Municipal, Andrashida
Referee: Ann-Helen Ostervold (Norway)

26 March 2006
19:05

England	0–0	France
	(Report)

Ewood Park, Blackburn
Attendance: 12,164
Referee: Skogvang (Norway)

20 April 2006
19:45

England	4–0	Austria
Carney 36'; Williams 85'; K. Smith 87'; Handley 92+'	(Report)

Priestfield, Gillingham
Attendance: 8.068
Referee: Fodic (Croatia)

22 April 2006
16:00

Hungary	0–5	France
	(Report)	Pichon 17', 27'; Bompastor 19'; Soubeyrand 36'; Lattaf 66'

Ezsperantó Út, Dunaujvaros
Referee: Günthner (Germany)

11 May 2006
19:05

England	2–0	Hungary
Exley 40'; Scott 91+'	(Report)

St Mary's, Southampton
Attendance: 8,817
Referee: Arwedahl (Sweden)

13 May 2006
19:00

Netherlands	0–2	France
	(Report)	Soubeyrand 7', 63'

Oosterenk, Zwolle
Referee: Damkova (Czech Republic)

26 August 2006
18:00

Austria	1–1	Hungary
Burger 85'	(Report)	Nagy 55'

Parkstadion, Bruckneudorf
Referee: Vitulano (Italy)

31 August 2006
20:05

England	4–0	Netherlands
K. Smith 9', 24' (pen.), 65'; Yankey 67'	(Report)

The Valley, Charlton, London
Attendance: 7,931
Referee: Ionescu (Romania)

20 September 2006
20:00

Netherlands	4–0	Austria
Demarteau 58'; Delies 88'; Smit 91', 94'	(Report)

Oosterenk, Zwolle
Referee: Raatikainen (Finland)

23 September 2006
16:00

France	2–1	Austria
Bussaglia 31', 38'	(Report)	Burger 35'

l'Aube, Troyes
Referee: Kulscar (Hungary)

24 September 2006
15:00

Netherlands	4–0	Hungary
Stevens 26', 36', 89'; Smit 90'	(Report)

Oosterenk, Zwolle
Referee: McDermott (Rep. of Ireland)

30 September 2006
19:00

France	1–1	England
Diguelman 88'	(Report)	Lattaf 63' (o.g.)

Route de Lorient, Rennes
Referee: Palmqvist (Sweden)

== Second Category ==
Teams in this Category had no chance to qualify to the World Cup. Originally, the winners of the second category, along with the two best runners-up (Israel and Romania), were to contest play-off matches against the bottom-placed teams of the first category. The play-off winners would then participate in the first category of UEFA Women's Euro 2009 qualifying. However, the play-offs were cancelled after UEFA changed the qualifying format to no longer be split into two divisions.

=== Group 6 ===
Armenia and Lithuania withdrew.

Team	Pts	Pld	W	D	L	GF	GA
Slovenia	18	6	6	0	0	23	6
Croatia	9	6	3	0	3	11	11
Bosnia and Herzegovina	7	6	2	1	3	5	12
Malta	1	6	0	1	5	4	14

28 August 2005

Slovenia	2–0	Bosnia and Herzegovina
Milenkovič 62'; Vais 68'

Matija Gubec, Krško
Attendance: 300
Referee: Correia (POR)

6 September 2005

Malta	1–4	Croatia
D'Agostino 9'		Baban 5'; Gabrić 25'; Tatjana Solaja 30'; Koljenik 90+4'

Ta'Qali National Stadium, Ta'Qali
Attendance: 55
Referee: Gavilán (ESP)

24 September 2005

Croatia	3–5	Slovenia
Leskovac 7'; Jakšić 15'; Pavlek 69'		Zver 11'; Nikl 22'; Vais 49', 75', 87'

Slavonski Brod
Attendance: 500
Referee: Gökcek (TUR)

29 October 2005

Croatia	2–0	Bosnia and Herzegovina
Kurjak 57'; Koljenik 90+1'

Slavonski Brod
Attendance: 250
Referee: Pavlova (RUS)

6 November 2005

Slovenia	4–1	Malta
Grad 17'; Vais 69'; Nikl 78', 85'		Tonna 65'

Matija Gubec, Krško
Attendance: 100
Referee: Kahrij (AZE)

25 March 2006

Bosnia and Herzegovina	1–0	Malta
Pehić 70'

Gradski SRC Slavija, Istocno Sarajevo
Attendance: 150
Referee: Medvedeva (KAZ)

29 March 2006

Croatia	1–0	Malta
Koljenik 43'

Vrbovec
Attendance: 300
Referee: Mamaeva (RUS)

26 April 2006

Malta	1–3	Slovenia
Theuma 87'		Maleševič 63', 65'; Vais 75'

Hibernians Ground, Paola
Attendance: 120
Referee: Aseeva (UKR)

7 May 2006

Bosnia and Herzegovina	1–6	Slovenia
Pehić 10'		Nikl 22', 85', 89'; Vais 46'; Milenkovič 62'; Petrovič 83'

Grbavica, Sarajevo
Attendance: 130
Referee: Quintero (ESP)

14 May 2006

Slovenia	3–0	Croatia
Vais 11', 90'; Milenkovič 26'

Matija Grubec, Krško
Attendance: 260
Referee: Spinelli (ITA)

20 May 2006

Bosnia and Herzegovina	2–1	Croatia
Kapetanović 30', 74'		Pirsa 49'

Bilino Polje, Zenica
Attendance: 700
Referee: Sinabova (BUL)

7 June 2006

Malta	1–1	Bosnia and Herzegovina
Theuma 23'		Skrbić 77'

Hibernians Ground, Paola
Attendance: 100
Referee: Bango (AUT)

=== Group 7 ===
Azerbaijan withdrew.

Team	Pts	Pld	W	D	L	GF	GA
Slovakia	15	6	5	0	1	14	5
Romania	9	6	3	0	3	14	10
Northern Ireland	7	6	2	1	3	7	11
Kazakhstan	4	6	1	1	4	3	12

20 August 2005

Slovakia	2–1	Romania
Budošová 34'; Strožová 45'		Spanu 17'

National Training Center, Senec
Attendance: 580
Referee: Grigoryan (ARM)

27 August 2005

Romania	4–1	Kazakhstan
Pufulete 22', 66'; Striblea 45'; Amza 78'		Yalova 44'

Poiana, Câmpina
Attendance: 100
Referee: Marković (SRB)

31 August 2005

Kazakhstan	0–4	Slovakia
		Budošová 8', 32', 63'; Zubková 79'

Kazhimukan Munaitpasov, Shymkent
Attendance: 550
Referee: Kulcsár (HUN)

29 October 2005

Romania	3–2	Northern Ireland
Pufulete 3'; Spanu 45'; Enache 81'		Furness 70'; Hall 90+1'

Mogoșoaia
Attendance: 200
Referee: Kiriou (GRE)

10 November 2005

Northern Ireland	2–1	Slovakia
O'Neil 2'; Furness 75'		Dugovičová 35'

Ballymena
Attendance: 350
Referee: Wnuk (POL)

30 March 2006

Slovakia	2–0	Northern Ireland
Ižová 22'; Budošová 49'

National Training Center, Senec
Attendance: 100
Referee: Remy (FRA)

22 April 2006

Northern Ireland	1–0	Kazakhstan
Hall 89'

Mourneview Park, Lurgan
Attendance: 366
Referee: Subotić (SRB)

11 May 2006

Slovakia	2–0	Kazakhstan

Senec

20 May 2006

Northern Ireland	1–4	Romania

Derry

17 June 2006

Kazakhstan	1–1	Northern Ireland

Almaty

22 June 2006

Romania	2–3	Slovakia

Mogoșoaia

31 August 2006

Kazakhstan	1–0	Romania

Almaty

=== Group 8 ===
Team	Pts	Pld	W	D	L	GF	GA
Wales	14	6	4	2	0	17	2
Israel	13	6	4	1	1	11	6
Estonia	4	6	1	1	4	6	18
Moldova	3	6	1	0	5	5	13

21 August 2005

Estonia	2–5	Israel
Morkovkina 19', 39'		Jan 12', 20', 54'; Shino 70'; Shenar 90+3'

Pärnu
Attendance: 200
Referee: De Boeck (Belgium)

24 September 2005

Moldova	3–1	Estonia
Slonova 8'; Ninicu 53'; Toma 70'		Morkovkina 59'

Republican, Chișinău
Attendance: 250
Referee: Heikkinen (Finland)

10 November 2005

Israel	2–0	Moldova
Dayan 90+2'; Cohen 90+3'

Haberfeld, Rishon LeZion
Attendance: 200
Referee: Remy (France)

26 March 2006

Wales	3–0	Moldova
Foster 11'; Hopkins 24'; Ludlow 62'

Latham Park, Newtown
Attendance: 660
Referee: Teixeira (Portugal)

30 March 2006

Wales	1–1	Israel
Fishlock 60'		Shelina 30'

Cardiff

23 April 2006

Wales	0–0	Estonia

Rhyl

7 May 2006

Israel	1–0	Estonia
Jan 36'

Herzliya

7 May 2006

Moldova	0–3	Wales
		Ludlow 53'; Jones 58'; Morgan 76'

Chișinău

11 May 2006

Moldova	0–1	Israel
		Jan 72'

Chișinău

18 June 2006

Estonia	3–2	Moldova
Palmaru 7'; Payo 34'; Morkovkina 42'		Andone 59'; Slovona 88'

Valga

20 August 2006

Israel	1–3	Wales
Ohana 67'		Foster 29'; Fishlock 37'; Ludlow 90+1'

Waalwijk, Netherlands

26 August 2006

Estonia	0–7	Wales
		Ludlow 34', 37'; Fishlock 47', 48'; Green 50'; Hopkins 70', 90+3'

Tallinn
