= UEFA Women's Euro 2009 qualifying =

Overview of the qualification round in the Women's Euro 2009

Qualifying for UEFA Women's Euro 2009 determined which 11 teams joined Finland, the hosts of the 2009 tournament, to play for the UEFA Women's Championship.

== Preliminary round ==
20 teams were divided into 5 groups of 4. The 5 group winners qualified for the actual qualifying stage, together with 25 countries exempted from the preliminary round.

=== Group A1 ===
in Turkey:

Team	Pld	W	D	L	GF	GA	GD	Pts
Northern Ireland	3	2	0	1	9	2	+7	6
Turkey	3	2	0	1	11	2	+9	6
Croatia	3	2	0	1	9	6	+3	6
Georgia	3	0	0	3	0	19	−19	0

18 November 2006
13:30 EET

Croatia	6–0	Georgia
Landeka 26', 29'; Koljenik 49', 52', 90+2'; Bucifal 57'	Report

Adana 5 Ocak Stadium, Adana
Referee: Tetiana Aseeva (Ukraine)

18 November 2006
13:30 EET

Northern Ireland	0–1	Turkey
	Report	Erol 88'

Tevfik Sırrı Gür Stadium, Mersin
Referee: Lena Arwedahl (Sweden)

20 November 2006
13:30 EET

Croatia	2–1	Turkey
Koljenik 30'; Landeka 44'	Report	Özgüvenç 3'

Tarsus Stadium, Tarsus
Referee: Tetiana Aseeva (Ukraine)

20 November 2006
13:30 EET

Georgia	0–4	Northern Ireland
	Report	Hutton 26', 49', 80'; Turner 81'

Adana 5 Ocak Stadium, Adana
Referee: Esther Staubli (Switzerland)

23 November 2006
13:30 EET

Northern Ireland	5–1	Croatia
Corish 3'; Hutton 15'; McFadden 60', 66', 90'	Report	Joščak 77'

Tarsus Stadium, Tarsus
Referee: Lena Arwedahl (Sweden)

23 November 2006
13:30 EET

Turkey	9–0	Georgia
Uraz 40', 76', 90'; Defterli 42', 66'; Şeker 52'; Yağ 53'; Özgüvenç 62'; Gogsadze 63' (o.g.)	Report

Adana 5 Ocak Stadium, Adana
Referee: Esther Staubli (Switzerland)

=== Group A2 ===
in Bosnia and Herzegovina:

Team	Pld	W	D	L	GF	GA	GD	Pts
Israel	3	3	0	0	9	2	+7	9
Bosnia and Herzegovina	3	1	1	1	7	7	0	4
Armenia	3	1	1	1	2	2	0	4
Latvia	3	0	0	3	1	8	−7	0

18 November 2006
11:00 CET

Israel	3–0	Latvia
Gian 28'; Fhima 32'; Shenar 70'	Report

Stadion Grbavica, Sarajevo
Attendance: 50
Referee: Berta Tavares (Portugal)

18 November 2006
11:00 CET

Bosnia and Herzegovina	1–1	Armenia
Škrbić 83'	Report	Kostanyan 32'

Asim Ferhatović Hase Stadium, Sarajevo
Attendance: 100
Referee: Efthalia Mitsi (Greece)

20 November 2006
11:00 CET

Israel	1–0	Armenia
Shenar 5'	Report

Asim Ferhatović Hase Stadium, Sarajevo
Attendance: 20
Referee: Berta Tavares (Portugal)

20 November 2006
11:00 CET

Latvia	1–4	Bosnia and Herzegovina
Verreva 29'	Report	Pehić 53', 63', 65'; A. Spahić 88'

Stadion Grbavica, Sarajevo
Attendance: 50
Referee: Silvia Spinelli (Italy)

23 November 2006
11:00 CET

Bosnia and Herzegovina	2–5	Israel
Škrbić 27'; Fetahović 46'	Report	Gian 13'; Shenar 23', 40', 81', 89'

Asim Ferhatović Hase Stadium, Sarajevo
Attendance: 200
Referee: Silvia Spinelli (Italy)

23 November 2006
11:00 CET

Armenia	1–0	Latvia
Kostanyan 27'	Report

Stadion Grbavica, Sarajevo
Attendance: 50
Referee: Efthalia Mitsi (Greece)

=== Group A3 ===
in Luxembourg:

Team	Pld	W	D	L	GF	GA	GD	Pts
Slovakia	3	3	0	0	15	0	+15	9
Luxembourg	3	1	1	1	5	7	−2	4
Lithuania	3	0	2	1	1	4	−3	2
Malta	3	0	1	2	2	12	−10	1

18 November 2006
16:00 CET

Slovakia	4–0	Luxembourg
Dugovičová 55', 58'; Strožová 60', 80'	Report

Stade Route de Luxembourg, Junglinster
Referee: Elia Martinez (Spain)

18 November 2006
19:00 CET

Malta	0–0	Lithuania
	Report

Stade Communal, Mondercange
Referee: Anouk de Jong (Netherlands)

20 November 2006
17:00 CET

Slovakia	3–0	Lithuania
Kolenová 18'; Dugovičová 41'; Strožová 81'	Report

Stade Am Deich, Ettelbruck
Referee: Anouk de Jong (Netherlands)

20 November 2006
19:30 CET

Luxembourg	4–2	Malta
Birkel 41', 53'; Hansen 72'; Settanni 80'	Report	Carabott 11', 16'

Stade François Trausch, Mamer
Referee: Hilda McDermott (Republic of Ireland)

23 November 2006
19:00 CET

Malta	0–8	Slovakia
	Report	Budošová 8', 53', 75'; Ondrušová 13'; Dugovičová 65', 76', 81'; Králiková 86'

Op Biirk, Mensdorf
Referee: Elia Martinez (Spain)

23 November 2006
19:00 CET

Lithuania	1–1	Luxembourg
Bložytė 30'	Report	Leuchter 59'

Grengewald, Hostert
Referee: Hilda McDermott (Republic of Ireland)

=== Group A4 ===
in Romania:

Team	Pld	W	D	L	GF	GA	GD	Pts
Romania	3	3	0	0	10	1	+9	9
Bulgaria	3	2	0	1	8	1	+7	6
Azerbaijan	3	1	0	2	4	9	−5	3
Estonia	3	0	0	3	2	13	−11	0

18 November 2006
11:00 EET

Romania	4–1	Azerbaijan
Olar-Spânu 29'; Pavel 61'; Laiu 73'; Striblea 87'	Report	Milyukhina 59'

Stadionul Mogoşoaia, Mogoşoaia
Referee: Marylin Remy (France)

18 November 2006
14:00 EET

Estonia	0–5	Bulgaria
	Report	Kostova 14', 21' (pen.), 34', 50'; Petrakieva 37'

Stadionul Otopeni, Otopeni
Referee: Yuliya Medvedeva-Keldyusheva (Kazakhstan)

20 November 2006
11:00 EET

Azerbaijan	3–2	Estonia
Osmanova 17'; Vasilieva 81', 83'	Report	Vaher 6'; Jaadla 59'

Stadionul Mogoşoaia, Mogoşoaia
Referee: Marylin Remy (France)

20 November 2006
14:00 EET

Romania	1–0	Bulgaria
Pavel 66'	Report

Stadionul Concordia, Chiajna
Referee: Rachel Cohen (Israel)

23 November 2006
13:30 EET

Estonia	0–5	Romania
	Report	Olar-Spânu 3'; Pavel 9'; Prundaru 14'; Laiu 35'; Rus 36'

Stadionul Mogoşoaia, Mogoşoaia
Referee: Rachel Cohen (Israel)

23 November 2006
13:30 EET

Bulgaria	3–0	Azerbaijan
Kostova 13'; Petrakieva 36'; Peeva 55'	Report

Stadionul Otopeni, Otopeni
Referee: Yuliya Medvedeva-Keldyusheva (Kazakhstan)

=== Group A5 ===
in Macedonia:

Team	Pld	W	D	L	GF	GA	GD	Pts
Wales	3	3	0	0	10	2	+8	9
Kazakhstan	3	2	0	1	3	2	+1	6
Faroe Islands	3	1	0	2	8	3	+5	3
Macedonia	3	0	0	3	0	14	−14	0

18 November 2006
13:00 CET

Wales	2–1	Faroe Islands
Foster 32'; Holt 90'	Report	Josephsen 90+2'

Stadion Mladost, Strumica
Referee: Kirsi Heikkinen (Finland)

18 November 2006
13:00 CET

Kazakhstan	1–0	Macedonia
Kirgizbaeva 59'	Report

Stadion Kukuš, Strumica
Referee: Knarik Grigoryan (Armenia)

20 November 2006
13:00 CET

Wales	6–0	Macedonia
Harries 9'; Ludlow 15'; Green 24'; Foster 36', 60'; Holt 54'	Report

Stadion Mladost, Strumica
Referee: Kirsi Heikkinen (Finland)

20 November 2006
13:00 CET

Faroe Islands	0–1	Kazakhstan
	Report	Li 8'

Stadion Kukuš, Strumica
Referee: Malgorzata Buchowska (Poland)

23 November 2006
13:00 CET

Kazakhstan	1–2	Wales
Yalova 56'	Report	Harries 23'; Ludlow 73'

Stadion Mladost, Strumica
Referee: Knarik Grigoryan (Armenia)

23 November 2006
13:00 CET

Macedonia	0–7	Faroe Islands
	Report	Josephsen 21', 62'; Andreasen 25', 28', 50', 73'; Kristiansen 57'

Stadion Kukuš, Strumica
Referee: Malgorzata Buchowska (Poland)

== Qualification round ==
The two winners of the preliminary round will join the 36 top ranked nations, with the exception of already qualified Sweden, and play in four groups of five teams and three of six teams. The group winners and the best ranked runner-up qualified for the final tournament. The other six runners-up will play three two-legged playoffs with those winners also advancing to the final tournament. This stage will run from September 2011 to September 2012.

=== Seeding ===
Israel, Northern Ireland, Romania, Slovakia and Wales will enter the UEFA Women's Euro 2009 qualifying draw on 13 December 2006, taking on the continent's strongest nations for a place in the 12-team finals in Finland.

Pot A	Pot B	Pot C	Pot D	Pot E
Germany (Holder); Sweden; Norway; Denmark; England; France	Russia; Italy; Czech Republic; Iceland; Ukraine; Netherlands	Spain; Scotland; Poland; Serbia; Switzerland; Hungary	Belgium; Portugal; Belarus; Republic of Ireland; Austria; Greece	Slovenia; Northern Ireland; Israel; Slovakia; Romania; Wales

== Qualifying stage ==
The six group winners automatically qualified for the final tournament. The six group runners-up and the four third-placed teams with the best record against the rest of the top four in their respective groups went into five two-legged play-offs.

=== Group 1 ===
Team	Pld	W	D	L	GF	GA	GD	Pts
England	8	6	2	0	24	4	+20	20
Spain	8	5	2	1	24	7	+17	17
Czech Republic	8	4	2	2	18	14	+4	14
Belarus	8	1	1	6	10	27	−17	4
Northern Ireland	8	0	1	7	2	26	−24	1

13 May 2007
13:00 BST

England	4–0	Northern Ireland
K. Smith 52'; Harkin 66' (o.g.); Chapman 73'; Sanderson 77'	Report

Priestfield, Gillingham
Attendance: 3,944
Referee: Ann Helen Østervold (Norway)

26 May 2007
15:00 BST

Northern Ireland	1–3	Czech Republic
McFadden 10'	Report	Chlumecká 11', 81', 85'

The Showgrounds, Coleraine
Referee: Berta Maria Correia Tavares (Portugal)

30 May 2007
17:00 EEST

Belarus	0–3	Spain
	Report	Vázquez 53'; Azagra 67'; Jiménez 84'

Spartak, Bobruisk
Referee: Lena Arwedahl (Sweden)

1 August 2007
17:00 EEST

Belarus	5–0	Northern Ireland
Kazeeva 26'; Tatarynova 49', 90'; Davydovich 57'; Kuzniatsova 80'	Report

Spartak, Bobruisk
Referee: Iwona Malek-wybraniec (Poland)

26 August 2007
17:00 EEST

Belarus	1–4	Czech Republic
Kuzniatsova 4'	Report	Heroldová 8'; Ščasná 33', 57' (pen.), 61'

Spartak, Bobruisk
Referee: Sjoukje de Jong (Netherlands)

27 October 2007
12:30 BST

England	4–0	Belarus
A. Scott 10', 64'; K. Smith 32'; Aluko 48'	Report

Bescot Stadium, Walsall
Attendance: 8,632
Referee: Marylin Remy (France)

27 October 2007
14:00 CEST

Czech Republic	2–2	Spain
I. Martínková 18'; Šmeralová 78'	Report	Martín 35'; Vilanova 90+4'

Stadion města Plzně, Plzeň
Referee: Florea Cristina Ionescu (Romania)

25 November 2007
18:00 GMT

England	1–0	Spain
Carney 64'	Report

New Meadow, Shrewsbury
Attendance: 8,753
Referee: Claudine Brohet (Belgium)

16 February 2008
17:00 CET

Spain	4–0	Northern Ireland
Del Río 17'; Bermúdez 27'; Vilas 59'; García 74'	Report

Estadio El Montecillo, Aranda de Duero
Referee: Christine Bango (Austria)

6 March 2008
20:30 CET

Northern Ireland	0–2	England
	Report	Williams 18'; White 84'

Mourneview Park, Lurgan
Referee: Silvia Tea Spinelli (Italy)

20 March 2008
20:05 CET

England	0–0	Czech Republic
	Report

Keepmoat Stadium, Doncaster
Referee: Eva Ödlund (Sweden)

26 April 2008
15:00 CEST

Czech Republic	4–0	Northern Ireland
Šmeralová 21'; L. Martínková 43'; I. Martínková 79' (pen.); Došková 90+3'	Report

Stadion Pod Lipou, Roudnice nad Labem
Referee: Marina Mamayeva (Russia)

3 May 2008
12:00 CEST

Spain	6–1	Belarus
Vázquez 11', 40'; Romero 28', 90'; Cuesta 68'; Pérez 88'	Report	Shpak 36'

La Ciudad del Fútbol, Madrid
Referee: Hilal Tuba Tosun Ayer (Turkey)

8 May 2008
16:00 CEST

Belarus	1–6	England
Ryzhevich 30'	Report	J. Scott 1'; Williams 7', 25', 87'; Sanderson 44'; White 90'

Darida Stadium, Minsk
Referee: Cristina Dorcioman (Romania)

8 May 2008
19:00 CEST

Spain	4–1	Czech Republic
Gimbert 46' (pen.); Boquete 57', 90+2' (pen.); Torrejón 84'	Report	Heroldová 33'

La Ciudad del Fútbol, Madrid
Referee: Gyöngyi Gaál (Hungary)

28 May 2008
20:45 CEST

Northern Ireland	0–3	Spain
	Report	Vázquez 9', 11'; Boquete 72'

The Showgrounds, Newry
Referee: Christina Westrum Pedersen (Norway)

26 June 2008
16:00 CEST

Czech Republic	3–1	Belarus
Ringelová 19'; L. Martínková 51', 81'	Report	Kiose 62'

TJ Ludgeřovice, Ludgeřovice
Referee: Ann Helen Østervold (Norway)

25 July 2008
20:30 CEST

Northern Ireland	1–1	Belarus
Hall 40'	Report	Kiose 84'

The Showgrounds, Newry
Referee: Mihaela Gurdon Bašimamović (Croatia)

28 September 2008
14:00 CEST

Czech Republic	1–5	England
Došková 28'	Report	Westwood 61'; K. Smith 79', 86'; Carney 81'; J. Scott 83'

Ďolíček Stadion, Prague
Referee: Christine Baitinger (Germany)

2 October 2008
20:30 CEST

Spain	2–2	England
Boquete 8'; Bermúdez 42'	Report	Carney 54'; K. Smith 76'

Estadio Ruta de la Plata, Zamora
Referee: Jenny Palmqvist (Sweden)

=== Group 2 ===
Team	Pld	W	D	L	GF	GA	GD	Pts
Sweden	8	8	0	0	31	0	+31	24
Italy	8	6	0	2	23	7	+16	18
Republic of Ireland	8	4	0	4	10	14	−4	12
Romania	8	1	1	6	8	28	−20	4
Hungary	8	0	1	7	6	29	−23	1

1 April 2007
16:00 CEST

Republic of Ireland	2–1	Hungary
Taylor 43'; Byrne 50'	Report	Gáspár 28'

Tolka Park, Dublin
Referee: Marija Damjanović (Croatia)

5 May 2007
15:00 CEST

Italy	0–2	Sweden
	Report; SvFF Report (in Swedish)	Seger 42'; Fischer 90+3'

Stadio Briamasco, Trento
Referee: Saša Ihringová (England)

5 May 2007
17:00 CEST

Hungary	3–3	Romania
Jakab 40', 68'; Milassin 89'	Report	Olar-Spânu 31'; Rus 38'; Pufulete 87'

Oláh Gábor utcai Stadion, Debrecen
Referee: Sabine Bonnin (France)

30 May 2007
20:45 CEST

Republic of Ireland	1–2	Italy
O'Toole 76'	Report	Paliotti 40'; Panico 59'

Belfield Park, Dublin
Referee: Tanja Schett (Austria)

16 June 2007
16:00 CEST

Romania	0–7	Sweden
	Report; SvFF Report (in Swedish)	Svensson 6', 25', 35', 38', 68'; Sjögran 14'; Schelin 75'

Stadionul Mogoșoaia, Mogoșoaia
Referee: Gordana Kuzmanović (Serbia)

20 June 2007
19:15 CEST

Sweden	7–0	Hungary
Svensson 12', 86'; Marklund 16'; Sjögran 22'; Segerström 52', 88'; Lundin 90+1'	Report; SvFF Report (in Swedish)

Tingvalla IP, Karlstad
Referee: Kirsi Heikkinen (Finland)

25 August 2007
09:30 CEST

Romania	0–2	Republic of Ireland
	Report	Curtis 12', 14'

Stadionul Mogoșoaia, Mogoșoaia
Referee: Rachel Cohen (Israel)

27 October 2007
14:00 CEST

Hungary	1–3	Italy
Pádár 70' (pen.)	Report	D'Adda 58'; Panico 76'; Tuttino 87'

Sportcentrum Bük, Bük
Referee: Paloma Quintero Siles (Spain)

27 October 2007
16:00 CEST

Republic of Ireland	2–1	Romania
O'Brien 18'; Curtis 31'	Report	Pufulete 40'

Richmond Park, Dublin
Referee: Kirsi Heikkinen (Finland)

31 October 2007
15:00 CEST

Italy	5–0	Romania
Boni 27'; Panico 41'; Paliotti 60', 66'; Gabbiadini 68'	Report

Stadio Il Noce, Parma
Referee: Bente Skogvang (Norway)

16 February 2008
15:00 CET

Italy	4–1	Republic of Ireland
Fuselli 83'; Gabbiadini 85'; Panico 86'; Conti 90+1'	Report	Taylor 13'

Stadio Comunale, Villacidro
Referee: Natalia Avdonchenko (Russia)

23 April 2008
13:00 CEST

Hungary	0–2	Republic of Ireland
	Report	O'Brien 1'; Curtis 63'

Diósgyöri Stadion, Miskolc
Referee: Aneliya Sinabova (Bulgaria)

3 May 2008
13:00 CEST

Hungary	0–6	Sweden
	Report	Karlsson 12'; Larsson 23'; Lundin 34', 69'; Fischer 37'; Edlund 79'

MOL Aréna Sóstó, Székesfehérvár
Referee: Snježana Fočić (Croatia)

7 May 2008
19:00 CEST

Sweden	1–0	Italy
Landström 90'	Report

Eyravallen, Örebro
Referee: Bibiana Steinhaus (Germany)

24 May 2008
14:00 CEST

Romania	1–6	Italy
Olar-Spânu 29'	Report	Gabbiadini 13', 67'; Panico 26'; Zorri 41' (pen.); Conti 48'; Fuselli 85'

Stadionul CNAF, Buftea
Referee: Efthalia Mitsi (Greece)

28 May 2008
14:00 CEST

Romania	3–1	Hungary
Amza 9'; Olar-Spânu 31'; Sârghe 82'	Report	Pádár 16'

Municipal Stadium, Oradea
Referee: Nadezhda Ulyanovskaya (Russia)

25 June 2008
20:45 CEST

Republic of Ireland	0–5	Sweden
	Report	Westberg 18', 73'; Svensson 23'; Öqvist 28'; Schelin 86'

Carlisle Grounds, Bray
Referee: Claudine Brohet (Belgium)

27 September 2008
18:00 CEST

Sweden	2–0	Romania
Sjögran 32'; Fischer 37'	Report

Swedbank Park, Västerås
Referee: Natalia Avdonchenko (Russia)

1 October 2008
19:00 CEST

Sweden	1–0	Republic of Ireland
Edlund 42'	Report

Vångavallen, Trelleborg
Referee: Tanja Schett (Austria)

2 October 2008
15:00 CEST

Italy	3–0	Hungary
Tona 19', 31', 54'	Report

Stadio Sandro Pertini, Montereale Valcellina
Referee: Kateryna Monzul (Ukraine)

=== Group 3 ===
Team	Pld	W	D	L	GF	GA	GD	Pts
France	8	7	0	1	31	2	+29	21
Iceland	8	6	0	2	27	4	+23	18
Slovenia	8	4	0	4	14	24	−10	12
Serbia	8	2	0	6	11	24	−13	6
Greece	8	1	0	7	7	36	−29	3

11 April 2007
19:00 CEST

France	6–0	Greece
Abily 25', 40', 81'; Soubeyrand 32'; Necib 41'; Lattaf 88'	Report

Stade Georges Pompidou, Valence
Referee: Emilia Wnuk (Poland)

5 May 2007
16:00 CEST

Slovenia	0–5	Serbia
	Report	Sretenović 57', 78'; Stanojević 62'; Randelovic 66'; Dimitrijević 90+3'

Dravograd Sports Centre, Dravograd
Referee: Katalin Kulcsár (Hungary)

30 May 2007
19:30 CEST

France	6–0	Slovenia
Abily 27'; Bussaglia 35'; Benak 50' (o.g.); Lattaf 69', 75'; Thiney 79'	Report

Stade Lebon, Angoulême
Referee: Silvia Tea Spinelli (Italy)

31 May 2007
17:00 CEST

Greece	0–3	Iceland
	Report	Viðarsdóttir 9' (pen.); Helgadóttir 14'; Samúelsdóttir 89'

Kesariani Stadium, Athens
Referee: Rhona Daly (Republic of Ireland)

16 June 2007
16:00 CEST

Iceland	1–0	France
Viðarsdóttir 81'	Report

Laugardalsvöllur, Reykjavík
Referee: Wendy Toms (England)

21 June 2007
23:15 CEST

Iceland	5–0	Serbia
Stefánsdóttir 3'; Lárusdóttir 23'; Jónsdóttir 58'; Viðarsdóttir 81'; Šiškovič 86' (o.g.)	Report

Laugardalsvöllur, Reykjavík
Referee: Dagmar Damková (Czech Republic)

25 August 2007
17:00 CEST

Serbia	1–2	Greece
Dimitrijević 71'	Report	Panteleiadou 23'; Tsoukala 73'

Kralj Petar I, Belgrade
Referee: Nadezhda Ulyanovskaya (Russia)

26 August 2007
17:00 CEST

Slovenia	2–1	Iceland
Benak 13'; Milenkovič 14' (pen.)	Report	Viðarsdóttir 5'

Dravograd Sports Centre, Dravograd
Referee: Ilonka Milanova Djaleva (Bulgaria)

27 October 2007
13:30 CEST

Serbia	0–8	France
	Report	Traïkia 12'; Abily 25'; Nécib 56'; Brétigny 62'; Thomis 64', 68'; Thiney 72'; Bussaglia 73'

Kralj Petar I, Belgrade
Referee: Kateryna Monzul (Ukraine)

31 October 2007
14:00 CEST

Slovenia	0–2	France
	Report	Bussaglia 67'; Thomis 81'

Dravograd Sports Centre, Dravograd
Referee: Ann Helen Østervold (Norway)

23 April 2008
16:30 EEST

Greece	0–5	France
	Report	Soubeyrand 39'; Herbert 49'; Bompastor 70'; Franco 85'; Thomis 90'

Yiannis Pathiakakis, Athens
Referee: Sandra Braz Bastos (Portugal)

3 May 2008
16:30 CEST

Serbia	0–3	Slovenia
	Report	Zver 58', 85', 88'

Gradski Zemun, Belgrade
Referee: Paloma Quintero Siles (Spain)

8 May 2008
15:00 CEST

France	2–0	Serbia
Brétigny 53', 71'	Report

Fred Aubert, Saint-Brieuc
Referee: Ausra Tvarijonaite (Lithuania)

28 May 2008
17:00 CEST

Serbia	0–4	Iceland
	Report	Viðarsdóttir 3', 68'; S. Gunnarsdóttir 47'; Ómarsdóttir 70'

Čika Dača Stadium, Kragujevac
Referee: Alexandra Ihringova (England)

28 May 2008
17:30 CEST

Slovenia	3–1	Greece
Benak 36'; Zver 38'; Petrović 90+1'	Report	Arvanitaki 31'

Dravograd Sports Centre, Dravograd
Referee: Paula Thörn (Sweden)

21 June 2008
16:00 CEST

Iceland	5–0	Slovenia
Viðarsdóttir 11' (pen.), 25', 50'; Jónsdóttir 62'; Ómarsdóttir 88'	Report

Laugardalsvöllur, Reykjavík
Referee: Sjoukje de Jong (Netherlands)

26 June 2008
17:30 CEST

Iceland	7–0	Greece
S Gunnarsdóttir 4'; Magnusdottir 13', 53', 56'; Viðarsdóttir 30', 68'; Ómarsdóttir 66'	Report

Laugardalsvöllur, Reykjavík
Referee: Anja Kunick (Germany)

27 September 2008
15:00 CEST

Greece	0–5	Serbia
	Report	Dimitrijević 5', 24'; Sretenović 11', 76'; Malimić 83'

Yiannis Pathiakakis Stadium, Athens
Referee: Silvia Tea Spinelli (Italy)

27 September 2008
16:00 CEST

France	2–1	Iceland
Soubeyrand 6'; Herbert 50'	Report	Jónsdóttir 47'

Stade Henri Desgrange, La Roche-sur-Yon
Referee: Dagmar Damková (Czech Republic)

2 October 2008
15:00 CEST

Greece	4–6	Slovenia
Arvanitaki 26', 88'; Papadopoulou 63'; Panteleiadou 76'	Report	Zver 14', 83', 85'; Milkovič 19', 47'; Maleševič 78'

Yiannis Pathiakakis Stadium, Athens
Referee: Kirsi Heikkinen (Finland)

=== Group 4 ===
Team	Pld	W	D	L	GF	GA	GD	Pts
Germany	8	8	0	0	34	1	+33	24
Netherlands	8	3	3	2	12	12	0	12
Switzerland	8	3	2	3	9	16	−7	11
Belgium	8	3	1	4	7	15	−8	10
Wales	8	0	0	8	1	19	−18	0

12 April 2007
15:55 CEST

Germany	5–1	Netherlands
Prinz 31'; Mittag 34'; Lingor 48' (pen.), 68'; Garefrekes 67'	Report	Torny 17'

Lohrheidestadion, Bochum
Referee: Jenny Palmqvist (Sweden)

5 May 2007
17:00 CEST

Switzerland	1–0	Belgium
Schäpper 16'	Report

Stade de Bouleyres, Bulle
Referee: Ausra Tvarijonaite (Lithuania)

9 May 2007
19:00 CEST

Switzerland	2–2	Netherlands
Schäpper 35'; Meyer 90+3'	Report	Melis 14' van Eyk 84'

Herti Allemand, Zug
Referee: Marina Mamayeva (Russia)

10 May 2007
17:20 CEST

Wales	0–6	Germany
	Report	Prinz 8', 18', 87'; Stegemann 44'; Garefrekes 81'; Müller 86'

Bridge Meadow Stadium, Haverfordwest
Referee: Marianne Svendsen (Denmark)

22 August 2007
18:00 CEST

Germany	7–0	Switzerland
Smisek 14'; Behringer 16', 35'; Prinz 33'; Garefrekes 52', 64', 90'	Report

Stadion Oberwerth, Koblenz
Referee: Alexandra Ihringova (England)

26 August 2007
15:00 CEST

Netherlands	2–1	Wales
Melis 47'; Smit 64'	Report	Jones 75'

Veronica, Volendam
Referee: Berta Maria Correia Tavares (Portugal)

28 October 2007
15:30 CEST

Wales	0–2	Switzerland
	Report	Graf 41'; Moser 83'

Belle Vue, Rhyl
Referee: Danijela Marković (Serbia)

28 October 2007
13:00 CEST

Germany	3–0	Belgium
Garefrekes 8'; Minnert 11'; Prinz 74'	Report

Lohmühle, Lübeck
Referee: Marija Damjanović (Croatia)

31 October 2007
19:00 CEST

Belgium	1–0	Wales
Zeler 75'	Report

Lorzestraat, Dessel
Referee: Katalin Kulcsár (Hungary)

1 November 2007
20:00 CEST

Netherlands	0–1	Germany
	Report	Krahn 36'

Kras Stadion, Volendam
Referee: Anna De Toni (Italy)

17 February 2008
15:30 CEST

Wales	0–1	Belgium
	Report	Maes 69'

Jenner Park Stadium, Barry
Referee: Sabine Bonnin (France)

20 February 2008
20:30 CEST

Wales	0–1	Netherlands
	Report	Melis 47'

Newport Stadium, Newport
Referee: Teodora Albon (Romania)

23 April 2008
20:00 CEST

Belgium	2–2	Netherlands
Verelst 41', 56'	Report	Hoogendijk 45+1'; Manon Melis 89'

Patro, Maasmechelen
Referee: Maaren Olander (Estonia)

27 April 2008
16:00 CEST

Belgium	3–1	Switzerland
Maes 25', 88'; Cayman 90+1'	Report	Bürki 38'

Stade des Géants, Ath
Referee: Jenny Palmqvist (Sweden)

7 May 2008
17:20 CEST

Belgium	0–5	Germany
	Report	Pohlers 20', 58'; Garefrekes 52', 59'; Bresonik 78'

Kehrweg, Eupen
Referee: Floarea Cristina Ionescu (Romania)

8 May 2008
19:00 CEST

Switzerland	2–0	Wales
Dickenmann 44', 76' (pen.)	Report

Stadion z’Hof, Oberdorf
Referee: Ilonka Milanova Djaleva (Bulgaria)

29 May 2008
16:00 CEST

Germany	4–0	Wales
Hingst 9'; Pohlers 12'; Krahn 30'; Behringer 77'	Report

Auestadion, Kassel
Referee: Rachel Cohen (Israel)

30 August 2008
19:00 CEST

Netherlands	1–1	Switzerland
Melis 58'	Report	Grundbacher 90+1'

Den Haag Stadion, The Hague
Referee: Floarea Cristina Ionescu (Romania)

27 September 2008
19:00 CEST

Netherlands	3–0	Belgium
Melis 17', 52'; Stevens 60' (pen.)	Report

Kras Stadion, Volendam
Referee: Alexandra Ihringova (England)

1 October 2008
16:00 CEST

Switzerland	0–3	Germany
	Report	Garefrekes 20'; Behringer 33'; Smisek 76'

Stadion Schützenmatte, Basel
Referee: Maaren Olander (Estonia)

=== Group 5 ===
Team	Pld	W	D	L	GF	GA	GD	Pts
Denmark	8	7	0	1	23	5	+18	21
Ukraine	8	6	1	1	15	3	+12	19
Scotland	8	3	1	4	15	7	+8	10
Slovakia	8	2	0	6	5	29	−24	6
Portugal	8	0	2	6	4	18	−14	2

14 April 2007
17:00 CEST

Slovakia	2–1	Portugal
Lukácsová 68' (pen.), 71'	Report	Zubková 90+4' (o.g.)

NTC Stadion, Senec
Referee: Ilonka Milanova Djaleva (Bulgaria)

6 May 2007
15:00 CEST

Scotland	0–0	Portugal
	Report

McDiarmid Park, Perth
Referee: Nadezhda Ulyanovskaya (Russia)

9 May 2007
17:00 CEST

Slovakia	0–4	Ukraine
	Report	Djatel 5'; Pekur 16'; Apanaschenko 38'; Khodyreva 79'

NTC Stadion, Senec
Referee: Paloma Quintero Siles (Spain)

30 May 2007
18:00 CEST

Ukraine	2–1	Scotland
Zinchenko 44'; Chorna 67'	Report	Fleeting 68'

Illichivets Stadium, Mariupol
Referee: Snježana Fočić (Croatia)

20 June 2007
18:00 CEST

Ukraine	5–0	Slovakia
Frishko 2', 53'; Zinchenko 16' (pen.); Pekur 26'; Khodyreva 47'	Report

Illichivets Stadium, Mariupol
Referee: Caroline de Boeck (Belgium)

27 October 2007
17:00 CEST

Slovakia	0–3	Scotland
	Report	Kerr 2'; Hamill 16'; Fleeting 71'

NTC Stadion, Senec
Referee: Bibiana Steinhaus (Germany)

27 October 2007
15:00 CEST

Denmark	5–1	Portugal
M. Pedersen 40', 82'; Pape 51', 71'; Sand Andersen 60'	Report	Fernandes 41'

Viborg Stadion, Viborg
Referee: Efthalia Mitsi (Greece)

31 October 2007
20:00 CEST

Scotland	0–1	Denmark
	Report	M. Pedersen 62'

McDiarmid Park, Perth
Referee: Anouk de Jong (Netherlands)

16 February 2008
16:00 CEST

Portugal	0–1	Slovakia
	Report	Budošová 11'

Estádio Municipal de Rio Maior, Rio Maior
Referee: Lena Arwedahl (Sweden)

21 February 2008
16:00 CEST

Portugal	0–1	Ukraine
	Report	Zinchenko 70'

Estádio Municipal de Abrantes, Abrantes
Referee: Kirsi Heikkinen (Finland)

23 April 2008
17:00 CEST

Slovakia	1–4	Denmark
Zubková 70'	Report	Pape 6', 55'; Rasmussen 16', 47'

NTC Stadion, Senec
Referee: Hilda McDermott (Republic of Ireland)

27 April 2008
12:00 CEST

Denmark	2–1	Scotland
Sand Andersen 50'; M Pedersen 67'	Report	Sneddon 28'

Viborg Stadion, Viborg
Referee: Silvia Tea Spinelli (Italy)

3 May 2008
17:00 CEST

Portugal	1–4	Scotland
Fernandes 44'	Report	Beattie 12'; Fleeting 20', 25', 38' (pen.)

Póvoa de Varzim Municipal Stadium, Póvoa de Varzim
Referee: Sabine Bonnin (France)

8 May 2008
17:00 CEST

Portugal	0–4	Denmark
	Report	Rasmussen 18'; Pape 53'; M. Pedersen 71', 78'

Sports Center CF Fão, Fão
Referee: Gordana Kuzmanović (Serbia)

28 May 2008
20:00 CEST

Denmark	6–1	Slovakia
Andersen 25'; M. Pedersen 35', 62', 90+1'; Pape 61', 81'	Report	Lukácsová 44'

Viborg Stadion, Viborg
Referee: Natalia Avdonchenko (Russia)

28 May 2008
20:30 CEST

Scotland	0–1	Ukraine
	Report	Apanaschenko 9'

McDiarmid Park, Perth
Referee: Tanja Schett (Austria)

22 June 2008
18:00 CEST

Ukraine	1–0	Denmark
Apanaschenko 28'	Report

Yuri Gagarin Stadium, Chernihiv
Referee: Dagmar Damková (Czech Republic)

27 September 2008
18:00 CEST

Ukraine	1–1	Portugal
Sukhorukova 6'	Report	Fernandes 45+1'

Yuri Gagarin Stadium, Chernihiv
Referee: Bibiana Steinhaus (Germany)

28 September 2008
16:00 CEST

Scotland	6–0	Slovakia
Beattie 26'; Fleeting 32', 68'; Hamill 38'; Little 51'; Grant 86'	Report

McDiarmid Park, Perth
Referee: Cristina Dorcioman (Romania)

1 October 2008
18:15 CEST

Denmark	1–0	Ukraine
M. Pedersen 63'	Report

Viborg Stadion, Viborg
Referee: Nicole Petignat (Switzerland)

=== Group 6 ===
Team	Pld	W	D	L	GF	GA	GD	Pts
Norway	8	7	1	0	26	0	+26	22
Russia	8	6	1	1	25	7	+18	19
Austria	8	3	0	5	13	18	−5	9
Poland	8	2	1	5	11	20	−9	7
Israel	8	0	1	7	3	33	−30	1

5 May 2007
16:00 CEST

Austria	0–1	Poland
	Report	Żelazko 8'

SV Freistadt, Freistadt
Referee: Teodora Albon (Romania)

10 May 2007
17:00 CEST

Israel	2–2	Poland
Erez 32'; Shelina 38'	Report	Żelazko 30'; Rytwińska 41'

Winter, Ramat Gan
Referee: Hilal Tuba Tosun Ayer (Turkey)

30 May 2007
17:00 CEST

Israel	0–6	Russia
	Report	Kurochkina 29'; Kremleva 45'; Mokshanova 54' 59' 70'; Chmatchkova 79'

Ramat Gan Stadium, Ramat Gan
Referee: Anja Kunick (Germany)

16 June 2007
16:00 CEST

Russia	3–1	Poland
Morozova 15'; Kurochkina 26' 63'	Report	Stobba 5' (pen)

Krasnoarmeysk Stadium, Krasnoarmeysk
Referee: Hilda Mcdermott (Republic of Ireland)

17 June 2007
17:00 CEST

Israel	0–3	Norway
	Report	Gulbrandsen 50' 73'; Wiik 78'

Ramat Gan Stadium, Ramat Gan
Referee: Yelena Savchenko (Kazakhstan)

21 June 2007
17:00 CEST

Poland	4–1	Israel
Stobba 1' 25'; Gawrońska 34'; Maciaszczyk 44'	Report	Ohana 60'

City Stadium, Kutno
Referee: Tetyana Aseeva (Ukraine)

21 June 2007
17:35 CEST

Norway	3–0	Austria
Gulbrandsen 45'; Wiik 73'; Rønning 90'	Report

Åråsen, Lillestrøm
Referee: Anelia Sinabova (Bulgaria)

23 August 2007
18:30 CEST

Austria	1–5	Russia
Fuhrmann 6'	Report	Kurochkina 36''; Mokshanova 48' 65'; Barbashina 62' 90+3'

Anger, Anger
Referee: Maaren Olander (Estonia)

26 August 2007
17:00 CEST

Austria	5–0	Israel
Wenninger 5'; Burger 48' 72' 90'; Celouch 74'	Report

Sparkassenstadion Gleisdorf, Gleisdorf
Referee: Lena Arwedahl (Sweden)

27 October 2007
16:00 CEST

Norway	3–0	Russia
Wiik 23'; Gulbrandsen 62'; Kaurin 88'	Report

Viking Stadion, Stavanger
Referee: Dagmar Damkova (Czech Republic)

3 May 2008
16:00 CEST

Norway	7–0	Israel
Wiik 12' 45'; Gulbrandsen 19' 82'; Mykjåland 52'; Christensen 54'; Nordby 75' (pen.)	Report

Sør Arena, Kristiansand
Referee: Carla De Boeck (Belgium)

7 May 2008
19:00 CEST

Norway	3–0	Poland
Storløkken 19'; Gulbrandsen 39'; Wiik 46'	Report

Viking Stadion, Stavanger
Referee: Christine Beck (Germany)

28 May 2008
16:00 CEST

Poland	2–4	Austria
Winczo 58'; Stobba 89'	Report	Gröbner 7'; Aigner 27'; Burger 40' 71'

City Stadium, Kutno
Referee: Florence Guillemin (France)

29 May 2008
15:00 CEST

Russia	4–0	Israel
Letyushova 9' 22'; Mokshanova 59' (pen.); Barbashina 67'	Report

Stadion Krasnoarmeysk, Krasnoarmeysk
Referee: Esther Staubli (Switzerland)

21 June 2008
18:00 CEST

Austria	0–4	Norway
	Report	Mykjåland 7' 58' 74'; Gulbrandsen 19'

Ertl Glas, Amstetten
Referee: Kateryna Monzul (Ukraine)

25 June 2008
16:00 CEST

Israel	0–2	Austria
	Report	Tieber 9'; Burger 43'

Beit She'an Municipal, Beit She'an
Referee: Marija Damjanovic (Croatia)

25 June 2008
16:30 CEST

Poland	0–3	Norway
	Report	Gulbrandsen 38'; Mykjåland 50'; Herlovsen 88'

City Stadium, Kutno
Referee: Floarea Cristina Ionescu (Romania)

27 August 2008
16:00 CEST

Russia	3–1	Austria
Mokshanova 5' 29'; Petrova 25'	Report	Aigner 33'

Stadion Krasnoarmeysk, Krasnoarmeysk
Referee: Eva Oedlund (Sweden)

27 September 2008
15:00 CEST

Poland	1–4	Russia
Rytwińska 83'	Report	Savchenkova 53'; Mokshanova 58' 85' (pen.); Kharchenko 81'

City Stadium, Kutno
Referee: Claudine Brohet (Belgium)

2 October 2008

Russia	0–0	Norway
	Report

Stadion Krasnoarmeysk, Krasnoarmeysk
Referee: Gyöngyi Gaál (Hungary)

=== Third-placed teams ===
Team	Pld	W	D	L	GF	GA	GD	Pts
Czech Republic	6	2	2	2	11	13	−2	8
Scotland	6	2	0	4	11	6	+5	6
Republic of Ireland	6	2	0	4	6	13	−7	6
Slovenia	6	2	0	4	5	19	−14	6
Switzerland	6	1	2	3	5	16	−11	5
Austria	6	1	0	5	6	18	−12	3

== Play-offs ==
Pot A	Pot B	Pot C
Russia; Ukraine; Iceland; Italy	Czech Republic; Scotland; Republic of Ireland; Slovenia	Spain; Netherlands

=== First legs ===
26 October 2008
15:00 WET

Republic of Ireland	1–1	Iceland
Curtis 63'	Report	Magnúsdóttir 2'

Richmond Park, Dublin
Referee: Silvia Tea Spinelli (Italy)

25 October 2008
14:30 CEST

Czech Republic	0–1	Italy
	Report	Panico 88'

Horni Pocernice Stadium, Prague 20
Referee: Teodora Albon (Romania)

26 October 2008
15:00 WET

Scotland	2–3	Russia
Hamill 3', 13'	Report	Kurochkina 4'; Mokshanova 32' (pen.); Barbashina 76'

Tynecastle Stadium, Edinburgh
Referee: Floarea Cristina Ionescu (Romania)

26 October 2008
14:00 CET

Slovenia	0–3	Ukraine
	Report	Apanaschenko 27', 41'; Lyshafay 54'

Dravograd Sports Centre, Dravograd
Referee: Alexandra Ihringova (England)

25 October 2008
19:30 CEST

Spain	0–2	Netherlands
	Report	Stevens 49'; Van De Ven 84'

Pabellón de la Ciudad del Fútbol, Madrid
Referee: Gyöngyi Gaál (Hungary)

=== Second legs ===
30 October 2008
19:10 CET

Iceland	3–0	Republic of Ireland
Lárusdóttir 23' 69'; Viðarsdóttir 60'	Report

Laugardalsvöllur, Reykjavík
Referee: Christine Beck (Germany)

Iceland won 4–1 on aggregate

29 October 2008
15:00 CET

Italy	2–1	Czech Republic
Zorri 32' (pen.); Panico 40'	Report	Ščasná 67'

Pietro Barbetti Stadium, Gubbio
Referee: Jenny Palmqvist (Sweden)

Italy won 3–1 on aggregate

30 October 2008
15:00 CET

Russia	1–2	Scotland
Dieke 20' (o.g.)	Report	Hamill 64' 85'

Spartak Stadium, Nalchik
Referee: Gyöngyi Gaál (Hungary)

Aggregate score 4–4; Russia won on away goals rule

30 October 2008
20:00 CET

Netherlands	2–0	Spain
Stevens 37' 56'	Report

Kras Stadion, Volendam
Referee: Tanja Schett (Austria)

Netherlands won 4–0 on aggregate

30 October 2008
17:00 CET

Ukraine	2–0	Slovenia
Djatel 3'; Apanaschenko 71'	Report

Y. Gagarin, Chernihiv
Referee: Claudine Brohet (Belgium)

Ukraine won 5–0 on aggregate

== Top goalscorers ==
Rank	Name	Goals	Minutes played
1	(Iceland) Margrét Lára Viðarsdóttir	12	867'
2	(Russia) Natalia Mokshanova	11	798'
3	(Denmark) Merete Pedersen	10	702'
4	(Norway) Solveig Gulbrandsen	9	680'
4	(Germany) Kerstin Garefrekes	9	720'
6	(Sweden) Victoria Svensson	8	349'
7	(Denmark) Maiken Pape	7	615'
7	(Scotland) Julie Fleeting	7	690'
7	(Netherlands) Manon Melis	7	692'
7	(Slovenia) Mateja Zver	7	802'
7	(Italy) Patrizia Panico	7	900'
