= Maria Karlsson =

Maria Karlsson may refer to:

- Maria Karlsson (footballer, born 1983), Swedish footballer
- Maria Karlsson (footballer, born 1985), Swedish footballer
