= Valentina Lanzieri =

Italian association football player

Personal information
- Date of birth: 21 June 1984 (age 42)
- Place of birth: Rome, Italy
- Height: 1.68 m (5 ft 6 in)
- Position: Centre back

Senior career*
Years	Team	Apps	(Gls)
- Lazio

International career
2003–2005	Italy	6	(0)
- * Club domestic league appearances and goals

Valentina Lanzieri (born 21 June 1984) is an Italian former footballer who played as a defender for Lazio.

== International career ==
Lanzieri was also part of the Italian team at the 2005 European Championships.
