= Steffen Horpestad =

Norwegian footballer (born 1975)

Personal information
- Full name: Steffen Horpestad
- Date of birth: 25 February 1975 (age 51)
- Position: Midfielder

Senior career*
Years	Team	Apps	(Gls)
1994–1995	Viking	3	(0)
1996	Bryne FK	9	(0)
- Kåsen IL
- Klepp IL
- * Club domestic league appearances and goals

Steffen Horpestad (born 25 February 1975) is a Norwegian former footballer who played as a midfielder. Horpestad played in three Tippeligaen matches for Viking FK. In 2006, he married footballer Ane Stangeland Horpestad.
