= Nadezhda Ulyanovskaya =

Soviet and Russian footballer

Nadezhda Avksentyevna Ulyanovskaya (Russian: Надежда Авксентьевна Ульяновская; born November 6, 1966, Vologda Oblast, RSFSR, USSR) is a former Soviet and Russian football player (central defender), a football referee. The inspector of UEFA.

== Biography ==
Candidate in master of sports in skiing. I finished school with a gold medal.

Worked as a milkmaid. He has a diploma of the trainer-instructor in skiing of the Lesgaft National State University of Physical Education, Sport and Health.

She was in favor of women's football teams Skorokhod (St. Petersburg), Tekstilschik (with whom she won the USSR championship in 1991), Kaluzhanka. In 1994, due to a serious injury, she was forced to end her playing career. On the recommendation of his coach in Kaluzhanka Yuri Prokhorov (1954-2017) decided to try his hand at judging. Starting with the Championship of the Kaluga region among juniors, Ulyanovskaya got to the first regional category, and then became the arbitrator of FIFA. Served, among other things, matches for men's teams.

The first woman in Russia is an arbitrator and a woman-football inspector. Awarded with the diploma of UEFA.
