= Mette Bjerg =

Danish association football player

Personal information
- Date of birth: 24 February 1976 (age 50)
- Position: Goalkeeper

Youth career
- –1998: Varde

Senior career*
Years	Team	Apps	(Gls)
1999–2001	Stensballe		
2002–2005	Horsens SIK		
2005–2007	Vejle B	35	
2007–2013	Horsens SIK		

International career
	Denmark	6	(0)
- * Club domestic league appearances and goals

Mette Bjerg (born 24 February 1976) is a Danish retired midfielder who played for Vejle BK, Horsens SIK and Denmark national team.

== International career ==
Bjerg was also part of the Danish team at the 2005 European Championships.
