= Anjela Toma =

Moldovan footballer

Personal information
- Date of birth: 11 August 1972 (age 54)
- Position: Midfielder

Senior career*
Years	Team	Apps	(Gls)
- Codru
- Roma Calfa

International career
200?–200?	Moldova	6	(1)
- * Club domestic league appearances and goals

Anjela Toma (born 11 August 1972) is a Moldovan former footballer who played as a midfielder. She has been a member of the Moldova women's national team.

== International career ==
Toma capped for Moldova at senior level during the UEFA second categories of two FIFA Women's World Cup qualifiers (2003 and 2007).
