= Noora Matikainen =

Finnish footballer (born 1980)

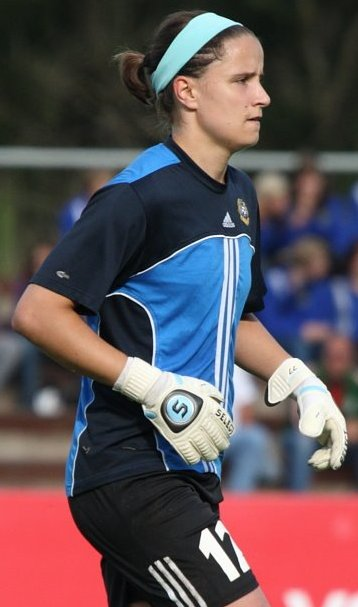

Personal information
- Date of birth: 14 October 1980 (age 46)
- Position: Goalkeeper

Senior career*
Years	Team	Apps	(Gls)
2000–2004	FC United		
2005	FC Espoo		
2006	HJK		
2007–2008	PuiU		
2009	Ilves		
2010	Amazon Grimstad		
2011–2012	FC Honka		
2013	HJK		

International career
2005	Finland	0	(0)
- * Club domestic league appearances and goals

Noora Matikainen (born 1 September 1980) is a Finnish football goalkeeper. During her playing career, Matikainen has played 300 games in the Kansallinen Liiga. The clubs included HJK, Ilves, FC Honka and FC United.

== International career ==
Matikainen was also part of the Finnish team at the 2005 European Championships. Noora Matikainen was a late replacement in the squad for Satu Peltonen who injured her calf.

== Honours ==
- Finnish League: 2002, 2004
- Finnish Cup: 2001, 2004, 2006
