= Katarína Dugovičová =

Slovak footballer

Personal information
- Date of birth: 3 February 1977 (age 49)
- Place of birth: Czechoslovakia
- Position: Forward

Senior career*
Years	Team	Apps	(Gls)
2014–2016	Altenmarkt	12	(1)

International career^{‡}
2006	Slovakia	3+	(6+)
- * Club domestic league appearances and goals ‡ National team caps and goals as of 23 November 2006

Katarína Dugovičová (born 3 February 1977) is a Slovak former footballer who played as a forward for the Slovakia national team.

== Club career ==
Dugovičová has played for SKV Altenmarkt in the Austrian ÖFB-Frauenliga.

== International career ==
Dugovičová has played for Slovakia at senior level during the UEFA Women's Euro 2009 qualifying.

== Career statistics ==
=== International ===
Scores and results list Slovakia's goal tally first

No.	Date	Venue	Opponent	Score	Result	Competition	Ref.
1	18 November 2006	Stade Route de Luxembourg, Junglinster, Luxembourg	Luxembourg	1–0	4–0	UEFA Women's Euro 2009 qualifying	
2	18 November 2006	Stade Route de Luxembourg, Junglinster, Luxembourg	Luxembourg	2–0	4–0	UEFA Women's Euro 2009 qualifying	
3	20 November 2006	Stade Am Deich, Ettelbruck, Luxembourg	Lithuania	2–0	3–0	UEFA Women's Euro 2009 qualifying	
4	23 November 2006	Op Biirk, Mensdorf, Luxembourg	Malta	4–0	8–0	UEFA Women's Euro 2009 qualifying	
5	23 November 2006	Op Biirk, Mensdorf, Luxembourg	Malta	6–0	8–0	UEFA Women's Euro 2009 qualifying	
6	23 November 2006	Op Biirk, Mensdorf, Luxembourg	Malta	7–0	8–0	UEFA Women's Euro 2009 qualifying	
