= Anna-Kaisa Rantanen =

Finnish footballer (born 1978)

Personal information
- Full name: Anna-Kaisa Rantanen
- Date of birth: 10 February 1978 (age 48)
- Place of birth: Turku, Finland
- Height: 1.71 m (5 ft 7 in)
- Position: Midfielder

Senior career*
Years	Team	Apps	(Gls)
1992–1996	Pyrkivä		
1997–1998	HJK		
1999–2000	Pyrkivä		
2001–2003	HJK		
2004–2008	Linköping		
2009	Djurgården	22	(2)
2010–2011	Wolfsburg	21	(1)
2011	Jitex	11	(0)
2012–2013	Klepp IL		

International career
1996–2011	Finland	105	(8)
- * Club domestic league appearances and goals

Anna-Kaisa Rantanen (born 10 February 1978) is a Finnish former football midfielder, who most recently played for Klepp IL of the Norwegian Toppserien.

== Career ==
Rantanen previously played for HJK Helsinki in the Naisten Liiga, Linköping FC, Djurgårdens IF and Jitex BK in the Swedish Damallsvenskan, and VfL Wolfsburg in the German Bundesliga.

She is a member of the Finnish national team since 1996, taking part in the 2005 and 2009 European Championships. She scored Finland's first goal in a final tournament. Rantanen announced her retirement from football in early 2014 after spending two seasons in Norway with Klepp. She later agreed to play on an informal basis for local minnows Randaberg IL.

== Titles ==
- 3 Finnish Leagues (1997, 1998, 2001)
- 3 Finnish Cups (1994, 1998, 2002)
- 1 Svenska Cupen (2008)
