= Kaluzhanka =

- Full name: Female football club Kaluzhanka (Kaluga)
- Founded: 1990
- Dissolved: 1999
- Ground: Central Stadium
- Manager: Yuri Prokhorov
- League: Russian Women's Football Championship
Home colours	Away colours

Kaluzhanka (Russian: Калужанка) was a women's football club from Kaluga. The team set up on the initiative Mikhail Ivanovich Sushanov, at first the team has funded a sewing factory Kaluzhanka whose name and had a team.

Because of financial difficulties the club in 1999 ceased to exist. Youth team was framed in a new club Annenki.

== Achievements ==
- Bronze medalist Championship of Russia 1994

== Bombardiers ==
- 19 Olga Letyushova
