= Vesna Stojanović =

Serbian footballer (born 1973)

Personal information
- Full name: Vesna Stojanović
- Date of birth: 24 January 1973 (age 53)
- Place of birth: SFR Yugoslavia
- Position: Striker

Senior career*
Years	Team	Apps	(Gls)
- Mašinac Niš
- Aegina

International career
1992–2006	Serbia		
- * Club domestic league appearances and goals

Vesna Stojanović (Serbian Cyrillic: Весна Стојановић; born 24 January 1973) is a Serbian former football striker. She played in Serbia and Greece, appearing in the UEFA Women's Cup with Mašinac Niš and AE Aegina.

She was a member of the Serbian national team for fourteen years.
