= Jelena Dimitrijević (footballer) =

Serbian footballer (born 1986)

Personal information
- Full name: Jelena Dimitrijević
- Date of birth: 26 August 1986 (age 40)
- Place of birth: SFR Yugoslavia
- Position: Striker

Team information
- Current team: AS Pontion Drapetsonas

Youth career
- 1997–2001: Mašinac Niš

Senior career*
Years	Team	Apps	(Gls)
2001–2006	Mašinac Niš		
2006–2018	PAOK		
2018–2019	Aris Thessalonikis		
2019–2020	Ialysos		
2023–2024	Nees Atromitou		
2024–	AS Pontion Drapetsonas		

International career
2002–2006	Serbia U19	16	(1)
2005–2010	Serbia	8	(4)

Managerial career
- 2020–2021: Ethnikos Meteoron
- 2021–2023: Leontes Thessalonikis
- 2024–: AS Pontion Drapetsonas (assistant)
- * Club domestic league appearances and goals

Jelena Dimitrijević (born 26 August 1986) is a Serbian football striker currently playing in the Greek Championship for PAOK Thessaloniki. She has played the Champions League with Mašinac Niš and PAOK.

She is a member of the Serbian national team.
