= Niki De Cock =

Belgian football midfielder

Personal information
- Full name: Niki De Cock
- Date of birth: 30 December 1985 (age 40)
- Place of birth: Lier, Belgium
- Height: 1.66 m (5 ft 5 in)
- Position: Midfielder

Senior career*
Years	Team	Apps	(Gls)
2000–2005	FCL Rapide Wezemaal		
2005–2007	Anderlecht		
2007–2010	Willem II		
2010–2015	Lierse		

International career^{‡}
2001–2002	Belgium U17	2	(2)
2001–2004	Belgium U19	31	(12)
2002–2015	Belgium	56	(4)
- * Club domestic league appearances and goals ‡ National team caps and goals as of 11 March 2015

Niki De Cock (born 30 December 1985) is a Belgian football midfielder currently playing for Lierse SK in the Belgian First Division. She has also played in the Dutch Eredivisie for Willem II. Her first game in the European Cup was in 2005 with FCL Rapide Wezemaal.

She is a member of the Belgian national team.

== Titles ==
- 2 Belgian Leagues (2004, 2005)
- 3 Belgian Cups (2001, 2003, 2004)
- 1 Belgian Supercup (2005)
