= Marianne Paulsen =

Norwegian footballer (born 1980)

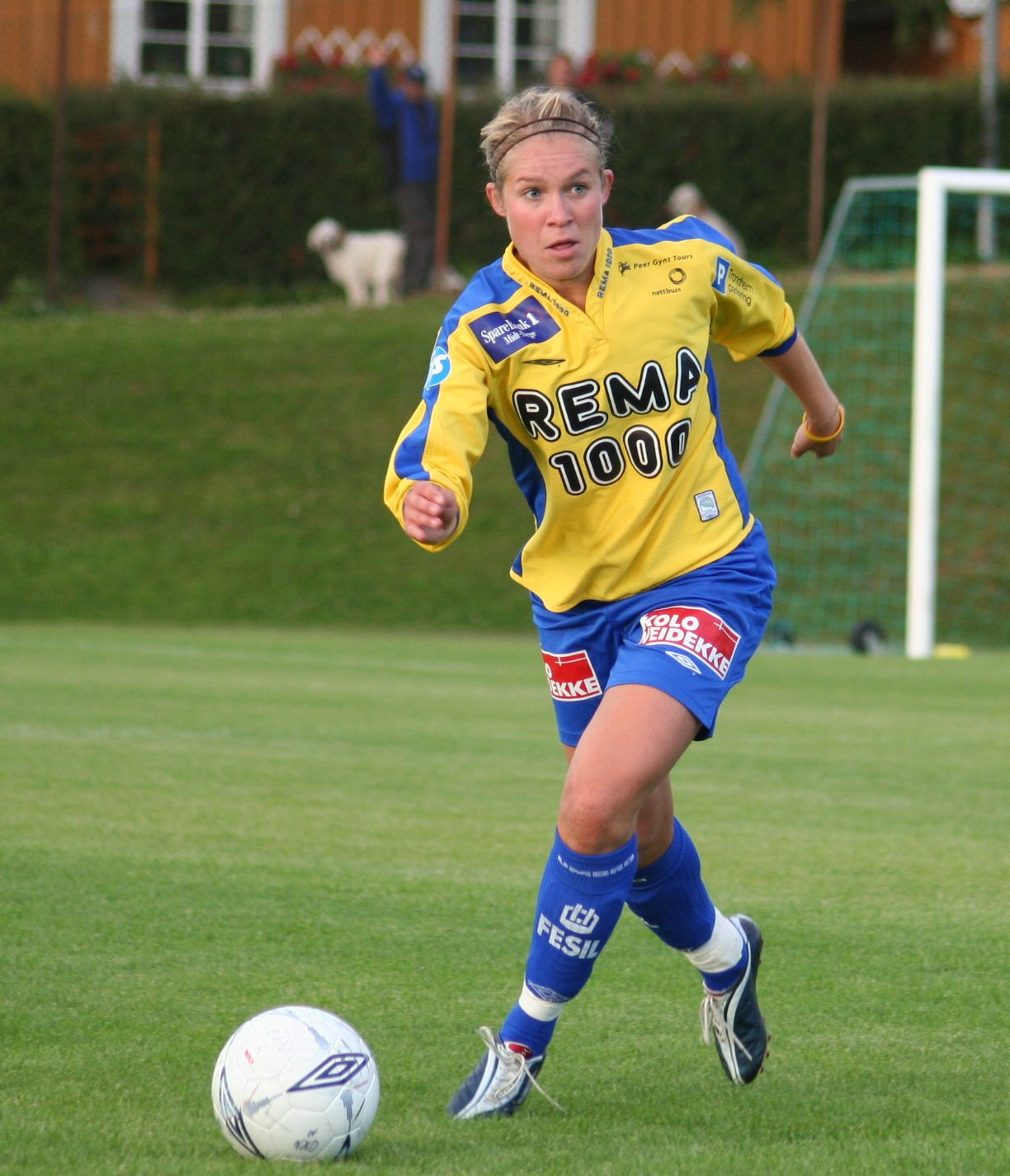

Personal information
- Date of birth: May 20, 1980 (age 46)
- Position: Defender

Team information
- Current team: Trondheims-Ørn
- Number: 3

Youth career
- Medkila

Senior career*
| Years | Team | Apps | (Gls) |
| –1999 | Medkila | | |
| 1999–2002 | Byåsen | | |
| 2002–2005 | Arna-Bjørnar | | |
| 2005– | Trondheims-Ørn | | |

International career^{‡}
| 1996–1997 | Norway u-16 | 15 | (0) |
| 1998–1999 | Norway u-18 | 4 | (0) |
| 2000–2002 | Norway u-21 | 14 | (0) |
| 2001–2006 | Norway | 22 | (0) |
- * Club domestic league appearances and goals ‡ National team caps and goals as of 19 December 2007

Marianne Paulsen (born 20 May 1980) is a Norwegian football defender that played for Trondheims-Ørn until she retired from football at the end of 2007. She played at right-back in Norway's team at the UEFA Women's Euro 2005.
