= Maria Karlsson (footballer, born 1983) =

Swedish footballer (born 1983)

Personal information
- Full name: Maria Karlsson
- Date of birth: 14 May 1983 (age 43)
- Place of birth: Sturefors, Sweden
- Height: 1.72 m (5 ft 7 1/2 in)
- Position: Midfielder

Youth career
- Sturefors IF

Senior career*
Years	Team	Apps	(Gls)
2000–2010	Linköpings FC	156	(27)
2011–2015	BK Tinnis		
2013	→ Växjö DFF (loan)		

International career^{‡}
2002	Sweden U-19	1	(0)
2004–2006	Sweden U-21	11	(1)
2004–2008	Sweden	11	(1)
- * Club domestic league appearances and goals as of 09:38, 17 August 2024 (UTC) ‡ National team caps and goals as of 09:38, 17 August 2024 (UTC)

Maria Karlsson (born 14 May 1983) is a Swedish former footballer who played for Linköpings FC of the Swedish Damallsvenskan. She could play as both a defender and midfielder and she was a member of the Sweden women's national football team.

== Club career ==
At Linköpings Karlsson was known as Maria "Mia" Karlsson, due to the presence of younger team-mate and namesake Maria "Kalle" Karlsson. Both left the club after the 2010 Damallsvenskan season. The elder Karlsson was particularly well thought of by Linköpings as she had joined in 2000, when the club played outside the top division and were known as Kenty DFF.

She subsequently played for local club BK Tinnis when her police training allowed. In 2013, she was dual-signed to Växjö DFF.

== Club career ==
Karlsson made her senior Sweden debut on 26 June 2004; a 2–1 Euro 2005 qualifying defeat by Italy in Benevento. She was included in the squad for the final tournament. On 3 May 2008 she scored her first goal for the senior national team in what proved to be her final cap, the opener in a 6–0 Euro 2009 qualifying win over Hungary in Székesfehérvár.
