= Maria Karlsson (footballer, born 1985) =

Swedish footballer (born 1985)

Maria Karlsson De Cecco (before Karlsson)
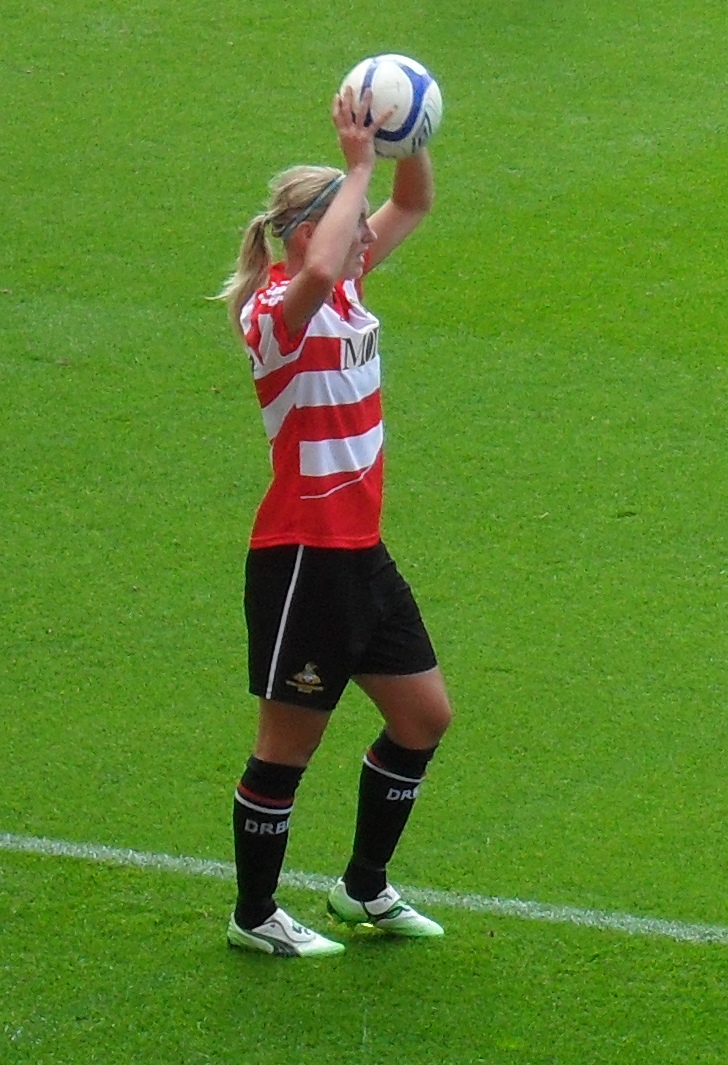

Personal information
- Full name: Maria Josefina Karlsson De Cecco
- Date of birth: 8 February 1985 (age 41)
- Place of birth: Gothenburg, Sweden
- Height: 5 ft 8 in (1.73 m)
- Positions: Defender; midfielder

Youth career
- 1999–2001: Sätila SK

Senior career*
Years	Team	Apps	(Gls)
2002–2008	Kopparbergs/Göteborg FC	112	(13)
2009–2010	Linköpings FC	38	(4)
2011	Doncaster Rovers Belles	13	(0)
2011	Jitex BK	6	(1)
2012–2014	Bardolino Verona	74	(15)
2014–2015	Brescia	25	(1)
2015–2016	AS Saint-Étienne	21	(0)
- * Club domestic league appearances and goals as of 15:35, 10 February 2018 (UTC) ‡ National team caps and goals as of 15:35, 10 February 2018 (UTC)

Maria Josefina Karlsson De Cecco (born 8 February 1985) is a Swedish former footballer. Her last club was AS Saint-Étienne of France's Division 1 Féminine, where she played as a defender. Karlsson De Cecco currently works as CEO and agent for the global football agency CMG, representing players and coaches within women's football.

== Club career ==
Karlsson De Cecco played for Kopparbergs/Göteborg FC (2002–2008) and Linköpings FC (2009–2010). After signing for Linköpings, Karlsson De Cecco was known as Maria Karlsson II, or Maria "Kalle" Karlsson due to the presence of senior teammate and namesake Maria "Kia" Karlsson. Karlsson De Cecco made 154 appearances in the Damallsvenskan, the highest level of women's football in Sweden. She won a League, Super cup and Cup triple with Linköping in 2009. She also played in the UEFA Women's Champions League in 2009, 2010, 2013 and 2015.

In January 2011 Karlsson De Cecco became the first Swede to sign for a club in the new FA WSL. After a successful trial, she signed a deal to play for Doncaster Rovers Belles while living at the Ramada Jarvis hotel in Doncaster. At the end of the English season Karlsson returned to Sweden, signing for Jitex BK. After six Damallsvenskan appearances and one goal, in November 2011 Karlsson De Cecco revealed she had departed Jitex and was considering a contract offer from Italian club Bardolino Verona. She signed a six-month deal to commence on 1 January 2012.

After moving on to Brescia, Karlsson De Cecco transferred to French Division 1 Féminine team AS Saint-Étienne in August 2015.

== International career ==
Karlsson De Cecco won a total of 57 caps with Sweden at youth level. These comprised eight caps at Under–17 level, 24 at Under–19 level and 25 at Under–21/23 level.

== See also ==
- Foreign players in the FA WSL
