= Manja Benak =

Slovenian football defender

Personal information
- Full name: Manja Benak
- Date of birth: 7 February 1989 (age 37)
- Place of birth: Miren, SFR Yugoslavia
- Height: 1.64 m (5 ft 5 in)
- Positions: Defender; midfielder

Team information
- Current team: ZNK Olimpija Ljubljana

Senior career*
Years	Team	Apps	(Gls)
2004–2005	Senozeti		
2005–2012	Krka		
2012–2013	Pomurje		
2013–2015	Ferencváros		
2015–	LUV Graz		

International career
2007–	Slovenia	26	(0)
- * Club domestic league appearances and goals

Manja Benak (born 7 February 1989) is a Slovenian football defender who plays for ZNK Olimpija Ljubljana of the Slovenian 1. Zenska Liga and the Slovenia national team. She previously played for ZNK Pomurje and Krka Novo Mesto of the 1.SZNL, representing both clubs in the UEFA Women's Champions League.
