= Olga Letyushova =

Russian footballer (born 1975)

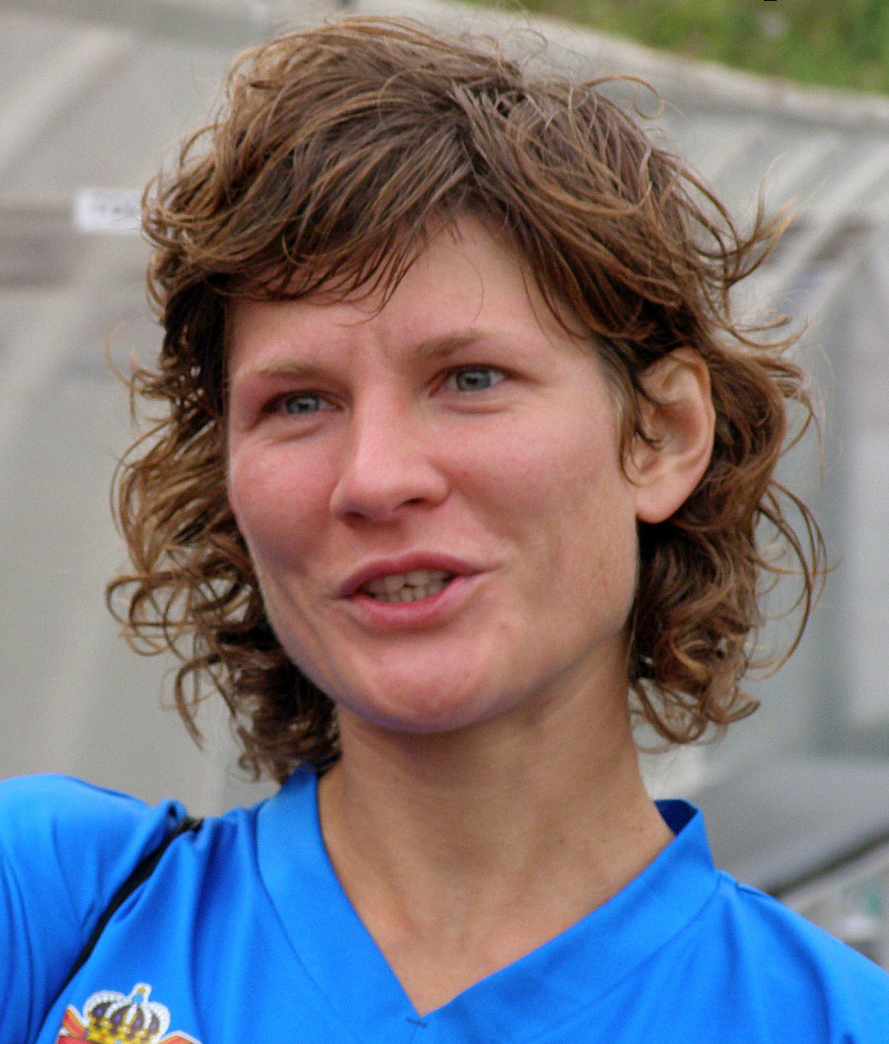

Personal information
- Full name: Olga Evgenyevna Letyushova
- Date of birth: 29 December 1975 (age 50)
- Place of birth: Voronezh, Russian SFSR, Soviet Union
- Height: 1.71 m (5 ft 7 in)
- Position: Striker

Senior career*
Years	Team	Apps	(Gls)
1990-1994	Energiya Voronezh	97	(41)
1995-1996	Kaluzhanka		(20)
1997-2003	Ryazan VDV		(121)
2004-2006	Rossiyanka		(71)
2007	Zvezda-2005 Perm		(19)
2008	SKA Rostov		(15)
2009-2010	Rossiyanka		(5)
2009	→ ShVSM Izmailovo (loan)		(8)

International career
1992-2009	Russia	73	(27)
- * Club domestic league appearances and goals

Olga Evgenyevna Letyushova (born 29 December 1975) is a Russian former footballer who played as a striker. One of the most prolific forwards in Russian women's football, she played for Energiya Voronezh, Kaluzhanka, Ryazan VDV, Rossiyanka, Zvezda-2005 Perm, SKA Rostov and ShVSM Izmailovo in the Russian Women's Football Championship.

Letyushova represented the Russia national team at the 1999 FIFA Women's World Cup, the 2001 UEFA Women's Championship and the 2003 FIFA Women's World Cup. According to Komsomolskaya Pravda, she earned 73 caps and scored 27 goals for Russia. Her career totals also include 30 goals for the USSR and Russia national teams combined.

== Club career ==
Letyushova began her senior career with Energiya Voronezh, making her first professional appearance as a 14-year-old in 1990. She later played for Kaluzhanka and Ryazan VDV, where she became one of the leading forwards in the Russian Championship.

With Ryazan she won the Russian Championship in 1999 and 2000. She later won further league titles with Rossiyanka in 2005, 2006 and 2010, and with Zvezda-2005 Perm in 2007. She also won the Russian Cup six times: in 1993, 1998, 2005, 2006, 2007 and 2010.

Letyushova was a seven-time top scorer of the Russian Championship, including in the 2004, 2005, 2006 and 2007 seasons. Komsomolskaya Pravda described her as the scorer of 356 goals in Russian championships and more than 600 goals in all competitions. Her career scoring record also includes 87 goals in Russian Cup matches, 29 goals in USSR championships and 11 goals in the UEFA Women's Champions League.

== International career ==
Letyushova played her first match for Russia in November 1992. She was a member of the Russia squad at the 1999 FIFA Women's World Cup in the United States, where Russia reached the quarter-finals. She scored twice in Russia's 5-0 group-stage win over Japan.

She also played at the 2003 FIFA Women's World Cup, again held in the United States, and scored against Ghana. With three goals at Women's World Cup finals, she is Russia's joint top scorer in the tournament alongside Elena Fomina. Letyushova also represented Russia at the 2001 UEFA Women's Championship in Germany.

== Honours ==
Ryazan VDV / Ryazan-TNK

- Russian Women's Football Championship: 1999, 2000
- Russian Women's Cup: 1998

Rossiyanka

- Russian Women's Football Championship: 2005, 2006, 2010
- Russian Women's Cup: 2005, 2006, 2010

Zvezda-2005 Perm

- Russian Women's Football Championship: 2007
- Russian Women's Cup: 2007

Energiya Voronezh

- Russian Women's Cup: 1993

Individual

- Russian Championship top scorer: seven times, including 2004, 2005, 2006 and 2007
- Russian Championship best forward: seven times
- Russian Footballer of the Year: three times, including 1999 and 2005
- Included in the Russian Championship list of the 33 best players for 18 consecutive seasons, 1992-2009
- Master of Sport of Russia, International Class
