= Katarina Strožová =

Slovak footballer

Personal information
- Date of birth: 13 February 1986 (age 40)
- Place of birth: Skalica, Czechoslovakia (now Slovakia)
- Height: 1.64 m (5 ft 5 in)
- Position: Forward

Team information
- Current team: Slovácko (assistant)

Senior career*
Years	Team	Apps	(Gls)
- Slovácko

International career^{‡}
2003	Slovakia U19	1	(?)
2010	Slovakia	1	(0)

Managerial career
- Slovácko (assistant)
- * Club domestic league appearances and goals ‡ National team caps and goals as of 25 August 2010

Katarina Strožová (born 13 February 1986) is a former Slovak footballer who played as a forward for Czech club 1. FC Slovácko. She has been a member of the Slovakia women's national team.

== International career ==
Strožová capped for Slovakia at senior level during the 2011 FIFA Women's World Cup qualification – UEFA Group 2, in a 0–2 away loss to Belarus on 25 August 2010.
