= Tatiana Zorri =

Italian footballer (born 1977)

Personal information
- Full name: Tatiana Zorri
- Date of birth: 19 October 1977 (age 49)
- Place of birth: Isola del Liri, Italy
- Height: 1.65 m (5 ft 5 in)
- Position: Midfielder

Senior career*
| Years | Team | Apps | (Gls) |
| 1993–2004 | Lazio | | |
| 2004–2008 | Torino | | (37) |
| 2008–2010 | Tavagnacco | 42 | (4) |
| 2010–2011 | Lazio | 29 | (8) |
| 2011–2012 | Torino | 19 | (5) |
| 2012–2013 | Bardolino | 22 | (3) |

International career
| 1994–2010 | Italy | 155 | (22) |
- * Club domestic league appearances and goals as of 6 March 2013

Tatiana Zorri is an Italian former football midfielder, who rounded off her career at Bardolino CF in Serie A. She has also played for SS Lazio, Torino CF and UPC Tavagnacco.

She was a member of the Italian national team for 16 years before retiring from international football in 2010, taking part in the 1999 World Cup and the 1997, 2001, 2005 and 2009 European Championships. With 155 games, she is the second most capped Italian player next to Patrizia Panico.

Zorri wanted to finish her career in 2012 but played on when she got an offer from Champions League contenders Bardolino. She retired a year later.
