= Ane Stangeland Horpestad =

Norwegian footballer (born 1980)

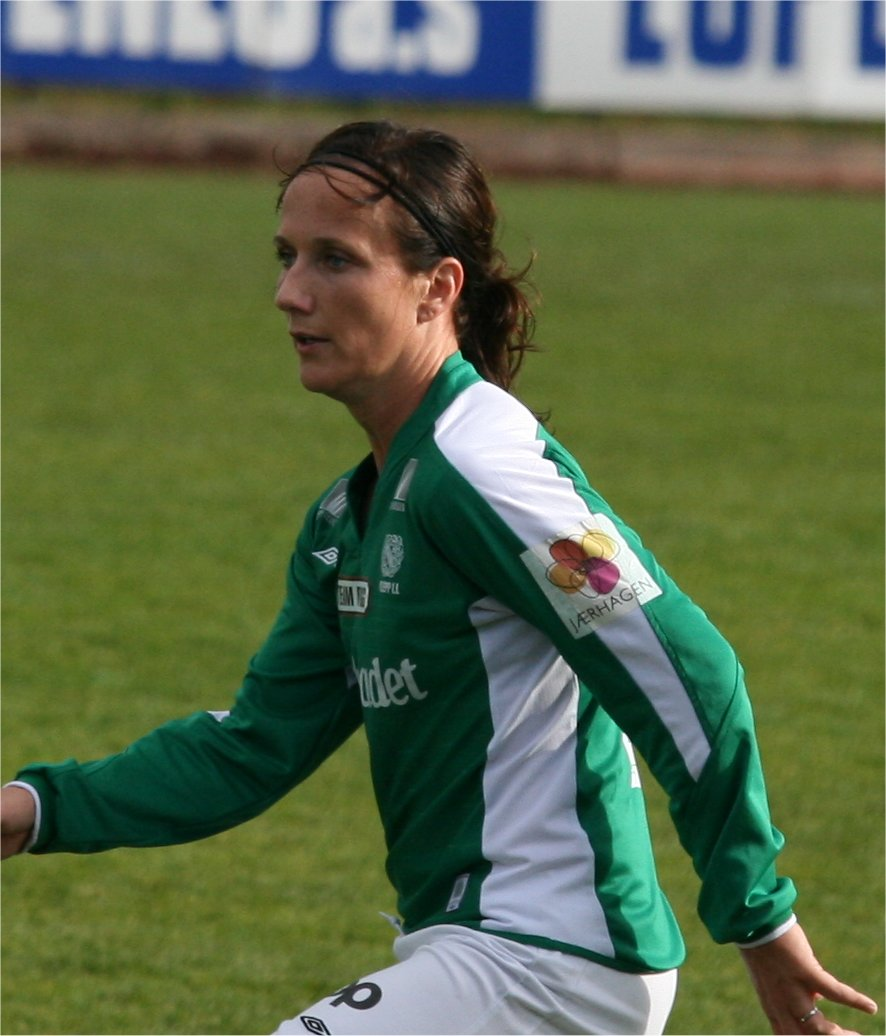
- With Klepp IL in 2007

Personal information
- Full name: Ane Stangeland Horpestad
- Birth name: Ane Stangeland
- Date of birth: 2 June 1980 (age 46)
- Place of birth: Stavanger, Norway
- Height: 1.66 m (5 ft 5 in)
- Position: Centre-back

Youth career
- Orre

College career
| Years | Team | Apps | (Gls) |
| 2000 | Mobile Rams | | |

Senior career*
| Years | Team | Apps | (Gls) |
| 1997–2005 | Klepp | | |
| 2006 | Kolbotn | | |
| 2007–2008 | Klepp | | |

International career^{‡}
| 1999–2008 | Norway | 107 | (5) |
- * Club domestic league appearances and goals ‡ National team caps and goals as of 27 September 2014

Ane Stangeland Horpestad (née Stangeland; born 2 June 1980) is a Norwegian former footballer who captained the Norway women's national football team. A cultured central defender, she represented Klepp and Kolbotn of the top Norwegian league, the Toppserien. She is from the seaside village of Orre in South-West Norway and lives in the town of Sandnes near Stavanger. Before joining Klepp at the age of 16 she played football only on boys' teams.

== Club career ==
In 2000, she attended university in the United States, where she was named 1st-Team National Association of Intercollegiate Athletics (NAIA) All-American, All-Conference and All-Region while at the University of Mobile, Alabama. She also won Region XIII Player of the Year honours and helped lead the team to the NAIA National Tournament.

For the 2006 season she left Klepp and moved to Oslo to play for Kolbotn, rejecting a competing offer from Trondheims-Ørn. She helped Kolbotn reach the semi-finals of the 2006–07 UEFA Women's Cup by beating 1. FFC Frankfurt in the quarter-finals. In June 2006 Stangeland married Steffen Horpestad, the assistant trainer of Klepp's men's team, and attached his surname to hers. At the end of 2006 Stangeland Horpestad returned to Norway's West Coast to play again for Klepp, where she trained twice a week with the men's team in addition to normal training.

In 2007 Stangeland Horpestad announced that she was contemplating retirement from football at the end of 2008 to have more free time and perhaps start a family. On 30 October 2008 she confirmed her intention to retire from football after the last game of the Norwegian season with Klepp on 2 November. She totalled 38 goals in 284 games across her two spells with Klepp, placing third in the club's all-time appearance list.

== International career ==
Stangeland Horpestad made her debut for the senior Norway women's national football team in a 2–2 draw with Italy in May 1999. She then returned to the national youth teams and was not selected for Norway's triumph at the 2000 Sydney Olympics. She broke back into the senior team in 2001 and was selected for UEFA Women's Euro 2001 in Germany and the 2003 FIFA Women's World Cup in the United States.

At the 2003 Algarve Cup, 22-year-old Stangeland Horpestad suffered the seventh nasal fracture of her career in Norway's match against France.

In 2005, she was appointed captain of the national team and in her next major tournament she led the team to second place at UEFA Women's Euro 2005 in North West England. In the semi-final of the tournament, against traditional rivals Sweden, a crowd of 5,700 watched as Solveig Gulbrandsen finished off a counterattack in extra time which won the match 3–2. In the final, Norway lost 3–1 to Germany at Ewood Park.

At the end of 2005 Stangeland Horpestad was included in the top 24 players in the annual FIFA World Player of the Year awards. She continued to lead Norway to further successes at the FIFA Women's World Cup 2007 in China, where she played in all Norway's matches and scored two goals. The team reached fourth place behind Germany, Brazil and the United States. Stangeland Horpestad was named in the tournament all-star team and was described as "the perfect captain" by coach Bjarne Berntsen.

Stangeland Horpestad was known for sporting play and received only two yellow cards in her career on Norway's senior national team. She has a bachelor's degree in economics and administration, and works for Klepp Sparebank (savings bank) as a customer adviser. One of her hobbies is salmon-fishing.

On 9 June 2008 she was named to the national team for the 2008 Summer Olympics in Beijing, China. In the tournament Norway progressed to the quarter-finals where they lost 1–2 to Brazil.

== See also ==
- List of women's footballers with 100 or more international caps
