= Minna Mustonen =

Finnish footballer (born 1977)

Personal information
- Date of birth: 26 July 1977 (age 49)
- Height: 1.80 m (5 ft 11 in)
- Position: Midfielder

College career
Years	Team	Apps	(Gls)
1998–2000	Franklin Pierce Ravens		

Senior career*
Years	Team	Apps	(Gls)
2000–2001	Boston Renegades		
2002	New York Power	12	(1)
2003	Carolina Courage	0	(0)

International career
1999–2005	Finland	67	(7)
- * Club domestic league appearances and goals

Minna Mustonen (born 26 July 1977) is a Finnish footballer who played as a midfielder. Mustonen represented the Finnish women's national football team 67 times and scored 7 goals. Mustonen was also part of the Finnish team at the 2005 European Championships.

She played for the Boston Renegades in 2000 and 2001.
