= Sara Di Filippo =

Italian football midfielder

Personal information
- Full name: Sara Di Filippo
- Date of birth: 29 June 1982 (age 44)
- Place of birth: Udine, Italy
- Position: Midfielder

Senior career*
Years	Team	Apps	(Gls)
1999–	Tavagnacco		

International career
?–2007	Italy	50	(4)
- * Club domestic league appearances and goals

Sara Di Filippo is an Italian football midfielder, currently playing for UPC Tavagnacco in Serie A. She has been a member of the Italian national team, playing the 2005 European Championship.
