= UEFA Women's Euro 2005 =

Tournament details
- Host country: England
- Dates: 5–19 June
- Teams: 8
- Venue: 5 (in 5 host cities)

Final positions
- Champions: Germany (6th title)
- Runners-up: Norway

Tournament statistics
- Matches played: 15
- Goals scored: 50 (3.33 per match)
- Attendance: 118,403 (7,894 per match)
- Top scorer: (Germany) Inka Grings (4 goals)
- Best player: (Finland) Anne Mäkinen

The 2005 UEFA Women's Championship, commonly referred to as the 2005 Women's Euros or just the 2005 Euros, was a football tournament for women held from 5 June to 19 June 2005 in Lancashire and Cheshire, England. The UEFA Women's Championship is a regular tournament involving European national teams from countries affiliated to UEFA, the European governing body, who have qualified for the competition. The competition aims to determine which national women's team is the best in Europe.

Germany won the competition for the fourth consecutive tournament, and the record-extending sixth time overall (including one win in the predecessor tournament, the European Competition for Representative Women's Teams). Their championship win was the last for coach Tina Theune-Meyer, who months earlier had announced her retirement effective at the end of the tournament. In her nine years in charge of Germany, they won three European titles, two bronze medals in the Olympics, and the 2003 World Cup.

Finland made its debut in the competition.

== Teams and structure ==
Eight national teams participated – seven of which qualified from earlier stages, plus England, which received an automatic berth as the host nation. They were split into two groups of four: Group A and Group B. Each team in a group played each other once, with the top two teams in each group progressing to the semi-finals. The winner faced the runner-up of the other group in a play-off, with the winner of each semi-final advancing to the final to determine the champion.

=== Group A ===
- England
- Sweden
- Finland
- Denmark

=== Group B ===
- Germany
- France
- Norway
- Italy

== Qualification ==
A qualifying round ran from 22 March to 3 October 2004. The teams which were entered played in a group stage, with the winners advancing to the final, and the runners-up being given the chance of qualification through a play-off. England, as the host nation, qualified automatically for the tournament. This was the first time in which the hosts qualified automatically for the final tournament.

The following teams were eliminated at this stage:

- Armenia, Austria, Belarus, Belgium, Bosnia-Herzegovina, Croatia, Estonia, Greece, Hungary, Israel, Kazakhstan, Malta, Netherlands, Poland, Portugal, Republic of Ireland, Romania, Scotland, Serbia and Montenegro, Slovakia, Spain, Switzerland, Ukraine

Three teams were also eliminated in play-offs for the tournament:

- Czech Republic, Iceland, Russia

More information on the qualification format at UEFA.com

== Squads ==
For a list of all squads that played in the final tournament, see 2005 UEFA Women's Championship squads

== Match officials ==
Croatia

- Blazenka Logarusic

Czech Republic

- Dagmar Damková
- Hana Spackova

England

- Amy Rayner
- Wendy Toms

Hungary

- Gyöngyi Gaál

Northern Ireland

- Andi Regan

Poland

- Katarzyna Nadolska

Romania

- Floarea Cristina Ionescu
- Irina Mirt

Slovakia

- Alexandra Ihringova
- Miroslava Migalova

Spain

- Yolanda Parga Rodriguez

Switzerland

- Elke Lüthi
- Nicole Petignat

United States of America

- Kari Seitz

== Results ==
=== First round ===
==== Group A ====
Pos	Team	Pld	W	D	L	GF	GA	GD	Pts	Qualification
1	Sweden	3	1	2	0	2	1	+1	5	Advance to knockout stage
2	Finland	3	1	1	1	4	4	0	4 (Note: Head-to-head result: Finland 2–1 Denmark.)	Advance to knockout stage
3	Denmark	3	1	1	1	4	4	0	4	
4	England (H)	3	1	0	2	4	5	−1	3	

(H) Hosts
Notes:
5 June 2005

Sweden	1–1	Denmark
Ljungberg 21'	Report	Rasmussen 29'

Bloomfield Road, Blackpool
Attendance: 3,231
Referee: Kari Seitz (United States)

5 June 2005

England	3–2	Finland
Valkonen 18' (o.g.); Barr 40'; Carney 90+1'	(Report)	Rantanen 56'; Kalmari 88'

City of Manchester Stadium, Manchester
Attendance: 29,092
Referee: Gyöngyi Gaál (Hungary)

8 June 2005

England	1–2	Denmark
Williams 52' (pen.)	(Report)	M. Pedersen 80'; Sørensen 88'

Ewood Park, Blackburn
Attendance: 14,695
Referee: Alexandra Ihringová (Slovakia)

8 June 2005

Sweden	0–0	Finland
	(Report)

Bloomfield Road, Blackpool
Attendance: 1,491
Referee: Dagmar Damková (Czech Republic)

11 June 2005

England	0–1	Sweden
	(Report)	Sjöström 3'

Ewood Park, Blackburn
Attendance: 25,694
Referee: Nicole Petignat (Switzerland)

11 June 2005

Finland	2–1	Denmark
Kalmari 6'; Kackur 16'	(Report)	Sørensen 45'

Bloomfield Road, Blackpool
Attendance: 2,500
Referee: Alexandra Ihringová (Slovakia)

==== Group B ====
Pos	Team	Pld	W	D	L	GF	GA	GD	Pts	Qualification
1	Germany	3	3	0	0	8	0	+8	9	Advance to knockout stage
2	Norway	3	1	1	1	6	5	+1	4	Advance to knockout stage
3	France	3	1	1	1	4	5	−1	4	
4	Italy	3	0	0	3	4	12	−8	0	

6 June 2005

Germany	1–0	Norway
Pohlers 61'	(Report)

Halliwell Jones Stadium, Warrington
Attendance: 1,600
Referee: Nicole Petignat (Switzerland)

6 June 2005

France	3–1	Italy
Lattaf 16'; Pichon 20', 30'	(Report)	Di Filippo 83'

Deepdale, Preston
Attendance: 957
Referee: Wendy Toms (England)

9 June 2005

Germany	4–0	Italy
Prinz 11'; Pohlers 18'; Jones 55'; Mittag 74'	(Report)

Deepdale, Preston
Attendance: 1,279
Referee: Kari Seitz (United States)

9 June 2005

Norway	1–1	France
Herlovsen 66'	(Report)	Mugneret-Béghé 20'

Halliwell Jones Stadium, Warrington
Attendance: 3,263
Referee: Gyöngyi Gaál (Hungary)

12 June 2005

France	0–3	Germany
	(Report)	Grings 72'; Lingor 77' (pen.); Minnert 83'

Halliwell Jones Stadium, Warrington
Attendance: 3,835
Referee: Floarea Cristina Ionescu (Romania)

12 June 2005

Norway	5–3	Italy
Klaveness 7', 57'; Christensen 29'; Gulbrandsen 35'; Mellgren 44'	(Report)	Gabbiadini 8', 53'; Camporese 69'

Deepdale, Preston
Attendance: 1,154
Referee: Dagmar Damková (Czech Republic)

=== Knockout stage ===
Semi-finals
15 June – Preston
Germany	4
Finland	1
16 June – Warrington
Sweden	2
Norway (a.e.t.)	3

Final
19 June – Blackburn
Germany	3
Norway	1

==== Semi-finals ====
15 June 2005

Germany	4–1	Finland
Grings 3', 12'; Pohlers 8'; Prinz 62'	(Report)	Mustonen 15'

Deepdale, Preston
Attendance: 2,785
Referee: Dagmar Damková (Czech Republic)

16 June 2005

Sweden	2–3 (a.e.t.)	Norway
Ljungberg 43', 89'	(Report)	Gulbrandsen 41', 109'; Herlovsen 65'

Halliwell Jones Stadium, Warrington
Attendance: 5,722
Referee: Kari Seitz (United States)

==== Final ====
19 June 2005
15:15 BST

Germany	3–1	Norway
Grings 21'; Lingor 24'; Prinz 63'	(Report)	Mellgren 41'

Ewood Park, Blackburn
Attendance: 21,105
Referee: Alexandra Ihringová (Slovakia)

GERMANY:
GK	1	Silke Rottenberg
DF	4	Steffi Jones
FW	6	Inka Grings	(substituted off) 68'
FW	9	Birgit Prinz (c)
MF	10	Renate Lingor
FW	11	Anja Mittag	(substituted off) 58'
DF	13	Sandra Minnert
MF	14	Britta Carlson	(substituted off) 81'
MF	16	Conny Pohlers
DF	17	Ariane Hingst
MF	18	Kerstin Garefrekes
Substitutes:
FW	20	Petra Wimbersky	(substituted on) 58'
FW	8	Sandra Smisek	(substituted on) 68'
DF	5	Sarah Günther	(substituted on) 81'
Manager:
Tina Theune

NORWAY:
GK	1	Bente Nordby
DF	2	Ane Stangeland (c)
DF	3	Gunhild Følstad
DF	4	Ingvild Stensland
DF	6	Marit Christensen
MF	7	Trine Rønning	(substituted off) 83'
MF	8	Solveig Gulbrandsen
FW	14	Dagny Mellgren
DF	17	Marianne Paulsen
FW	19	Stine Frantzen	(substituted off) 59'
FW	20	Lise Klaveness	(substituted off) 87'
Substitutes:
FW	9	Isabell Herlovsen	(substituted on) 59'
MF	18	Marie Knutsen	(substituted on) 83'
FW	16	Kristin Blystad-Bjerke	(substituted on) 87'
Manager:
Bjarne Berntsen

MATCH OFFICIALS

- Assistant referees:
  - Blaženka Logarušić (Croatia)
  - Yolanda Parga Rodríguez (Spain)
- Fourth official: Dagmar Damková (Czech Republic)

== Goalscorers ==
4 goals

- (Germany) Inka Grings

3 goals

- (Germany) Conny Pohlers
- (Germany) Birgit Prinz
- (Norway) Solveig Gulbrandsen
- (Sweden) Hanna Ljungberg

2 goals

- (Denmark) Cathrine Paaske-Sørensen
- (Finland) Laura Österberg Kalmari
- (France) Marinette Pichon
- (Germany) Renate Lingor
- (Italy) Melania Gabbiadini
- (Norway) Isabell Herlovsen
- (Norway) Lise Klaveness
- (Norway) Dagny Mellgren

1 goal

- (Denmark) Merete Pedersen
- (Denmark) Johanna Rasmussen
- (England) Amanda Barr
- (England) Karen Carney
- (England) Fara Williams
- (Finland) Heidi Kackur
- (Finland) Minna Mustonen
- (Finland) Anna-Kaisa Rantanen
- (France) Stéphanie Mugneret-Béghé
- (France) Hoda Lattaf
- (Germany) Steffi Jones
- (Germany) Sandra Minnert
- (Germany) Anja Mittag
- (Italy) Elisa Camporese
- (Italy) Sara Di Filippo
- (Norway) Marit Christensen
- (Sweden) Anna Sjöström

Own goal

- (Finland) Sanna Valkonen (playing against England)

== Legacy ==
The tournament was viewed as a successful one by The Football Association. The tournament is credited with popularising women's football in England.

== See also ==
- UEFA Women's Championship
- UEFA
- Women's football (soccer)
