= Swedish women's football clubs in international competitions =

This is a compilation of the results of teams representing Sweden at official international women's football competitions such as the former UEFA Women's Cup and its successor, the UEFA Women's Champions League.

Sweden has been a powerhouse of the competition, especially in the UEFA Women's Cup era with two trophies for Umeå and four other appearances at the final by Umeå and Djurgården/Älvsjö in eight editions. In the UEFA Women's Champions League Tyresö has reached the final once too. Both the champion and the runner-up of the Damallsvenskan qualify for the competition as Sweden is ranked 3rd in the UEFA Women's Champions League association standings as of the 2016–17 edition with a coefficient of 61,500.

== Teams ==
These are the eight teams that have representred Sweden in the UEFA Women's Cup and the UEFA Women's Champions League.

Club	Founded	County	City	Appearances	First	Last	Best result
Djurgården	1960s	Stockholm County	Stockholm	2	2004–05	2005–06	2 / 7 – Finalist
Eskilstuna United	2002	Södermanland County	Eskilstuna	1	2016–17	2016–17	5 / 7 – Last 16
Göteborg	1970	Västra Götaland County	Gothenburg	2	2011–12	2012–13	4 / 7 – Quarterfinals
Linköping	2003	Östergötland County	Linköping	3	2009–10	2014–15	4 / 7 – Quarterfinals
Örebro	1980	Örebro County	Örebro	1	2015–16	2015–16	5 / 7 – Last 16
Rosengård	1970	Skåne County	Malmö	7	2003–04	2016–17	3 / 7 – Semifinals
Tyresö	1971	Stockholm County	Tyresö	1	2013–14	2013–14	2 / 7 – Finalist
Umeå	1985	Västerbotten County	Umeå	9	2001–02	2010–11	1 / 7 – Champion

== Historical progression ==
		2001–02	2002–03	2003–04	2004–05	2005–06	2006–07	2007–08	2008–09	2009–10
Champion			UME	UME						
Finalist		UME	UME	UME	DJU		UME	UME		
Semifinalists		UME	UME	UME – ROS	DJU	DJU	UME	UME	UME	UME
Quarterfinalists		UME	UME	UME – ROS	DJU – UME	DJU	UME	UME	UME	UME
Round of 16		Not played	Not played	Not played	DJU – UME	DJU	UME	UME	UME	UME – LIN
Round of 32		UME	UME	UME – ROS						UME – LIN
Earlier stages										LIN
	2010–11	2011–12	2012–13	2013–14	2014–15	2015–16	2016–17			
Champion
Finalist				TYR						
Semifinalists				TYR						
Quarterfinalists	LIN	GÖT – ROS	GÖT – ROS	TYR	LIN – ROS	ROS	ROS			
Round of 16	LIN	GÖT – ROS	GÖT – ROS	TYR – ROS	LIN – ROS	ROS – ÖRE	ROS – ESK			
Round of 32	LIN	GÖT – ROS	GÖT – ROS	TYR – ROS	LIN – ROS	ROS – ÖRE	ROS – ESK			
Earlier stages	UME									

== Results by team ==
=== Djurgården ===
2004–05 UEFA Women's Cup
Round	Opponent	1st	2nd	Agg.	Scorers
Last 16 (group stage)	(Greece) Aegina	5–0		3 points	James 2 – Bengtsson – Callebaut
Last 16 (group stage)	(Spain) Athletic Bilbao	3–2		6 points	Svensson 2 – Bengtsson
Last 32 (group stage)	(England) Arsenal	0–1		6 points	
Quarterfinals	(Sweden) Umeå	a: 2–1	h: 1–0	3–1	Bengtsson – Fagerström – Nykvist
Semifinals	(England) Arsenal	h: 1–1	a: 1–0	2–1	Ekblom – Svensson
Final	(Germany) Turbine Potsdam	h: 0–2	a: 1–3	1–5	Bengtsson

2005–06 UEFA Women's Cup
Round	Opponent	1st	2nd	Agg.	Scorers
Last 16 (group stage)	(Iceland) Valur	2–1		3 points	Johansson – Svensson
Last 16 (group stage)	(Kazakhstan) Alma	3–0		6 points	Johansson – Svensson – Thunebro
Last 16 (group stage)	(Serbia and Montenegro) Mašinac Niš	7–0		9 points	Nykvist 2 – Bengtsson – James – Johansson – Svensson – Thunebro
Quarterfinals	(Czech Republic) Sparta Prague	a: 2–0	h: 0–0	2–0	Svensson 2
Semifinals	(Germany) Turbine Potsdam	a: 3–2	h: 2–5	5–7	Svensson 2 – Fagerström – Kalmari – Norlin

=== Eskilstuna United ===
2016–17 UEFA Women's Champions League
Round	Opponent	1st	2nd	Agg.	Scorers
Last 32	(Scotland) Glasgow City	h: 1–0	a: 2–1	3–1	Schough 2 – Larsson
Last 16	(Germany) Wolfsburg	h: 1–5	h: 0–3	1–8	Banušić

=== Göteborg ===
2011–12 UEFA Women's Champions League
Round	Opponent	1st	2nd	Agg.	Scorers
Last 32	(Croatia) Osijek	a: 4–0	h: 7–0	11–0	Lindén 2 – Sembrant 2 – Törnqvist 2 – Ahlstrand – Almgren – Dahlkvist – Ek – Liljegärd
Last 16	(Denmark) Fortuna Hjørring	a: 1–0	h: 3–2	4–2	Almgren – Ek – Stensland – Törnqvist
Quarterfinals	(England) Arsenal	a: 1–3	h: 1–0	2–3	Ek – Törnqvist

2012–13 UEFA Women's Champions League
Round	Opponent	1st	2nd	Agg.	Scorers
Last 32	(Serbia) Spartak Subotica	a: 1–0	h: 3–0	4–0	Schough 2 – Levin – Press
Last 16	(Denmark) Fortuna Hjørring	a: 1–1	h: 3–2	4–3	Press 2 – Averbuch – Schough
Quarterfinals	(France) Juvisy	a: 0–1	h: 1–3	1–4	Averbuch

=== Linköping ===
2009–10 UEFA Women's Champions League
Round	Opponent	1st	2nd	Agg.	Scorers
Qualifiers (group stage)	(Moldova) Roma Calfa	11–0		3 points	Brännström 5 – Asllani – Karlsson – Krantz – Sharro – Seger – Skalberg
Qualifiers (group stage)	(Northern Ireland) Glentoran	3–0		6 points	Asllani – Brännström – Karlsson
Qualifiers (group stage)	(Romania) Clujana	6–0		9 points	Brännström 3 – Asllani – Landström – Sharro
Last 32	(Switzerland) Zürich	a: 2–0	h: 3–0	5–0	Andersson – Brännström – Karlsson – Landström – Seger
Last 16	(Germany) Duisburg	a: 1–1	h: 0–2	1–3	Asllani

2010–11 UEFA Women's Champions League
Round	Opponent	1st	2nd	Agg.	Scorers
Last 32	(Slovenia) Krka Novo Mesto	a: 7–0	h: 5–0	12–0	Fors 3 – Karlsson 3 – Asllani 2 – Sällström 2 – Brännström – Ikidi
Last 16	(Czech Republic) Sparta Prague	h: 2–0	a: 1–0	3–0	Asllani – Rohlin – Samuelsson
Quarterfinals	(England) Arsenal	h: 1–1	a: 2–2	3–3 (agr)	Sällström 2 – Asllani

2014–15 UEFA Women's Champions League
Round	Opponent	1st	2nd	Agg.	Scorers
Last 32	(England) Liverpool	a: 1–2	h: 3–0	4–2	Rolfö 3 – Minde
Last 16	(Russia) Zvezda Perm	h: 5–0	a: 0–3	5–3	Ericsson – Harder – Knudsen – Rohlin – Rolfö
Quarterfinals	(Denmark) Brøndby	h: 0–1	a: 1–1	1–2	Knudsen

2017–18 UEFA Women's Champions League
Round	Opponent	1st	2nd	Agg.	Scorers
Last 32	(Cyprus) Apollon Limassol	a: 1–0			Minde

=== Örebro ===
2015–16 UEFA Women's Champions League
Round	Opponent	1st	2nd	Agg.	Scorers
Last 32	(Greece) PAOK	a: 3–0	h: 5–0	8–0	Talonen 2 – Abrahamsson – Chukwudi – Engström – Michael – Spetsmark
Last 16	(France) Paris Saint-Germain	h: 1–1	a: 0–0	1–1 (agr)	Talonen

=== Rosengård ===
2003–04 UEFA Women's Cup
Round	Opponent	1st	2nd	Agg.	Scorers
Last 32 (group stage)	(Finland) United Jakobstad	3–0		3 points	Kackur 2 – Larsson
Last 32 (group stage)	(Israel) Maccabi Holon	6–1		6 points	Jönsson 2 - Kackur 2 - Andersson - Westerblad
Last 32 (group stage)	(Ukraine) Lehenda Chernihiv (host)	3–0		9 points	Kackur 2 - Andersson
Quarterfinals	(Norway) Kolbotn	h: 2–0	a: 0–1	2–1	Kackur 2
Semifinals	(Germany) Frankfurt	h: 0–0	a: 1–4	1–4	Kackur

2011–12 UEFA Women's Champions League
Round	Opponent	1st	2nd	Agg.	Scorers
Last 32	(Italy) Tavagnacco	a: 1–2	h: 5–0	6–2	Gunnardóttir 2 – Melis 2 – Fischer – Wilhelmsson
Last 16	(Austria) Neulengbach	a: 3–1	h: 1–0	4–1	Gunnarsdóttir 2 – Melis 2
Quarterfinals	(Germany) Frankfurt	h: 1–0	a: 0–3	1–3	Gunnarsdóttir

2012–13 UEFA Women's Champions League
Round	Opponent	1st	2nd	Agg.	Scorers
Last 32	(Hungary) MTK	a: 4–0	h: 6–1	10–1	Veje 3 – Mittag 2 – Anker-Kofoed 2 – Rubensson 2 – Ørntoft
Last 16	(Italy) Bardolino	h: 1–0	a: 2–0	3–0	Gunnarsdóttir – Mittag – Wilhelmsson
Quarterfinals	(France) Olympique Lyonnais	a: 0–5	h: 0–3	0–8	

2013–14 UEFA Women's Champions League
Round	Opponent	1st	2nd	Agg.	Scorers
Last 32	(Norway) Lillestrøm	a: 3–1	h: 5–0	8–1	Melis 3 – Bachmann 2 – Mittag 2 – Sjögran
Last 16	(Germany) Wolfsburg	h: 1–2	a: 1–3	2–5	Bachmann – Gunnarsdóttir

2014–15 UEFA Women's Champions League
Round	Opponent	1st	2nd	Agg.	Scorers
Last 32	(Russia) Ryazan	a: 3–1	h: 2–0	5–1	Mittag 3 – Marta – Schmidt
Last 16	(Denmark) Fortuna Hjørring	h: 2–1	a: 2–0	3–0	Schmidt – Marta – Mittag
Quarterfinals	(Germany) Wolfsburg	a: 1–1	h: 3–3	4–4 (agr)	Marta 2 – Gunnarsdóttir – Mittag

2015–16 UEFA Women's Champions League
Round	Opponent	1st	2nd	Agg.	Scorers
Last 32	(Finland) PK-35	a: 2–0	h: 7–0	9–0	Bélanger 3 – van de Ven 2 – Andonova – Ilestedt – Marta – Nilsson
Last 16	(Italy) Verona	a: 3–1	h: 5–1	8–2	Marta 4 – Bélanger – Gunnarsdóttir
Quarterfinals	(Germany) Frankfurt	h: 0–1	a: 1–0 (aet)	1–1 (p: 4–5)	Gunnarsdóttir

2016–17 UEFA Women's Champions League
Round	Opponent	1st	2nd	Agg.	Scorers
Last 32	(Iceland) Breiðablik	a: 1–0	h: 0–0	1–0	Schelin
Last 16	(Czech Republic) Slavia Prague	a: 3–1	h: 3–0	6–1	Enganamouit 3 – Masar – Nilsson
Quarterfinals	(Spain) Barcelona	h: 0–1	a: 0–2	0–3	

2017–18 UEFA Women's Champions League
Round	Opponent	1st	2nd	Agg.	Scorers
Last 32	(Romania) Olimpia Cluj	a: 1–0			Wieder

=== Tyresö ===
2013–14 UEFA Women's Champions League
Round	Opponent	1st	2nd	Agg.	Scorers
Last 32	(France) Paris Saint-Germain	h: 2–1	a: 0–0	2–1	Press 2
Last 16	(Denmark) Fortuna Hjørring	a: 2–1	h: 4–0	6–1	Press 2 – Boquete – Engen – Marta – van de Ven
Quarterfinals	(Austria) Neulengbach	h: 8–1	a: 0–0	8–1	Marta 3 – Press 3 – Dahlkvist – Edlund
Semifinals	(England) Birmingham City	h: 0–0	a: 3–0	3–0	Press 2 – Marta
Final	(Germany) Wolfsburg	3–4		Runner-up	Marta 2 – Boquete

=== Umeå ===
2001–02 UEFA Women's Cup
Round	Opponent	1st	2nd	Agg.	Scorers
Last 32 (group stage)	(Czech Republic) Sparta Prague	1–0		3 points	Sjöström
Last 32 (group stage)	(Bulgaria) Varna	3–0		6 points	Eriksson - Nordbrandt - Nordlund
Last 32 (group stage)	(Hungary) Femina Budapest	6–0		9 points	Nordbrandt 2 - Sjöström - Göras - Lindqvist
Quarterfinals	(Russia) Ryazan	h: 4–1	a: 3–1	7–2	Ljungberg 4 - Runesson 2 - Moström
Semifinals	(Finland) HJK	h: 2–1	a: 1–0	3–1	Ljungberg 2 - Kapstad
Final	(Germany) Frankfurt	0–2		Runner-up	

2002–03 UEFA Women's Cup
Round	Opponent	1st	2nd	Agg.	Scorers
Last 32 (group stage)	(Faroe Islands) KÍ	7–0		3 points	Ljungberg 4 - Lindqvist 2 - Runesson
Last 32 (group stage)	(Estonia) Visa Tallinn	4–0		6 points	Dahlqvist - Nordbrandt - Ljungberg - Runesson
Last 32 (group stage)	(Czech Republic) Sparta Prague	6–1		9 points	Dahlqvist - Kapstad - Ljungberg - Marklund - Moström - Sjöström
Quarterfinals	(France) Toulouse	h: 2–0	a: 0–0	2–0	Dahlqvist - Ljungberg
Semifinals	(Germany) Frankfurt	h: 1–1	a: 1–1 (aet)	2–2 (p: 7–6)	Dahlqvist - Nordbrandt
Final	(Denmark) Fortuna Hjørring	h: 4–1	a: 3–0	7–1	Ljungberg 3 - Kalmari 2 - Möström - Östberg

2003–04 UEFA Women's Cup
Round	Opponent	1st	2nd	Agg.	Scorers
Last 32 (group stage)	(Northern Ireland) Newtownabbey Strikers	15–0		3 points	Lindqvist 5 - Ljungberg 2 - Kalmari 2 - Julin - Moström - Dahlqvist - Eriksson - Nordbrandt
Last 32 (group stage)	(Romania) Clujana	6–0		6 points	Runesson 2 - Julin - Nordbrandt - Lundgren
Last 32 (group stage)	(Czech Republic) Slavia Prague	2–1		9 points	Dahlqvist - Ljungberg
Quarterfinals	(Russia) Energiya Voronezh	a: 2–1	h: 2–1	4–2	Julin - Ljungberg - Marklund
Semifinals	(Denmark) Brøndby	a: 3–2	h: 1–0	4–2	Marta 2 - Julin
Final	(Germany) Frankfurt	h: 3–0	a: 5–0	8–0	Marta 3 - Östberg 2 - Sjöström 2 - Moström

2004–05 UEFA Women's Cup
Round	Opponent	1st	2nd	Agg.	Scorers
Last 16 (group stage)	(Slovenia) Krka Novo Mesto	7–1		3 points	Ljungberg 4 – Eriksson – Nordbrandt
Last 32 (group stage)	(Belarus) Babruyshanka	5–1		6 points	Julin – Kapstad – Lindqvist – Marta –Sjöström
Last 32 (group stage)	(Serbia and Montenegro) Mašinac Niš (host)	8–0		9 points	Lindqvist 2 – Bergqvist – Kalmari – Ljungberg – Marta – Östberg – Paulsson
Quarterfinals	(Sweden) Djurgården	a: 1–2	a: 0–1	1–3	Kalmari

2006–07 UEFA Women's Cup
Round	Opponent	1st	2nd	Agg.	Scorers
Last 16 (group stage)	(Ukraine) Lehenda Chernihiv	2–0		3 points	Elaine – Marta
Last 16 (group stage)	(Spain) Espanyol	3–0		6 points	Klaveness – Ljungberg – Moström
Last 16 (group stage)	(Norway) Kolbotn (host)	2–1		9 points	Klaveness - Mäkinen
Quarterfinals	(Netherlands) Saestum	a: 6–1	h: 5–2	11–3	Ljungberg 3 – Klaveness 3 – Marta 2 – Moström 2 – Sjöström
Semifinals	(Norway) Kolbotn	a: 5–1	6–0	11–1	Ljungberg 4 – Marta 4 - Klaveness – Mäkinen – Moström
Final	(England) Arsenal	h: 0–1	a: 0–0	0–1	

2007–08 UEFA Women's Cup
Round	Opponent	1st	2nd	Agg.	Scorers
Last 16 (group stage)	(Romania) Clujana	3–1		3 points	Klaveness 2 – Edlund
Last 16 (group stage)	(Belarus) Universitet Vitebsk	2–0		6 points	Pedersen 2
Last 16 (group stage)	(Russia) Rossiyanka	2–2		7 points	Marta 2
Quarterfinals	(Belgium) Rapide Wezemaal	a: 4–0	h: 6–0	10–0	Marta 4 – Edlund 2 – Bachmann – Ljungberg – Westberg
Semifinals	(France) Olympique Lyonnais	a: 1–1	h: 0–0	1–1 (agr)	Edlund
Final	(Germany) Frankfurt	h: 1–1	a: 2–3	3–4	Dahlkvist – Marta – Östberg

2008–09 UEFA Women's Cup
Round	Opponent	1st	2nd	Agg.	Scorers
Last 16 (group stage)	(Iceland) Valur	5–1		3 points	Ljungberg 3 – Edlund – Marta
Last 16 (group stage)	(Kazakhstan) Alma	6–0		6 points	Bachmann 3 – Marta 2 – Rasmussen
Last 16 (group stage)	(Italy) Bardolino	4–0		9 points	Marta 2 – Bachmann – Rönnlund
Quarterfinals	(England) Arsenal	a: 2–3	h: 6–0	8–3	Marta 4 – Ljungberg – Östberg – Rönnlund – Yamaguchi
Semifinals	(Russia) Zvezda Perm	a: 0–2	h: 2–2	2–4	Edlund – Ljungberg

2009–10 UEFA Women's Champions League
Round	Opponent	1st	2nd	Agg.	Scorers
Last 32	(Ukraine) Zhytlobud Kharkiv	a: 5–0	h: 6–0	11–0	Bachmann 3 – Dahlkvist – Edlund – Jakobsson – Konradsson – Yamaguchi – Zingmark
Last 16	(Russia) Rossiyanka	a: 1–0	h: 1–1	2–1	Jakobsson 2
Quarterfinals	(France) Montpellier	h: 0–0	a: 2–2	2–2 (agr)	Jakobsson – Zingmark
Semifinals	(France) Olympique Lyonnais	a: 2–3	h: 0–0	2–3	Pettersson 2

2010–11 UEFA Women's Champions League
Round	Opponent	1st	2nd	Agg.	Scorers
Qualifiers (group stage)	(Israel) ASA Tel Aviv	3–0		3 points	Kapstad – Linda Molin – Zingmark
Qualifiers (group stage)	(Cyprus) Apollon Limassol (host)	1–4		3 points	Saari
Qualifiers (group stage)	(Bosnia and Herzegovina) Sarajevo	1–0		6 points	Chikwelu
