= 2002 UEFA Women's Cup final =

- Event: 2001–02 UEFA Women's Cup
Umeå	Frankfurt
(Sweden)	(Germany)
0	2
- Date: 23 May 2002
- Venue: Waldstadion, Frankfurt
- Referee: Katriina Elovirta (Finland)
- Attendance: 12,106

The 2002 UEFA Women's Cup final was a football match that took place on 23 May 2002 at the Waldstadion, Frankfurt between Umeå IK of Sweden and Frankfurt of Germany.

The match was the final of the 2001–02 UEFA Women's Cup, the first edition of the UEFA Women's Cup/Women's Champions League.

Frankfurt won the single leg final 2–0. It was the only final of the Women's Cup to not be contested over two legs.

The attendance of over 12,000 was claimed by UEFA as a European record for women's club football, ignoring the existence of earlier reported women's club match attendances of up to 53,000.

== Match ==
=== Details ===
23 May 2002
18:00 CEST

Frankfurt (Germany)	2–0	(Sweden) Umeå
Jones 68'; Prinz 90'	Report

Waldstadion, Frankfurt
Attendance: 12,106
Referee: Katriina Elovirta (Finland)

GK	1	(Netherlands) Marleen Wissink
DF	2	(Germany) Sandra Minnert
DF	3	(Denmark) Louise Hansen	(substituted off) 86'
DF	20	(Germany) Jutta Nardenbach
DF	22	(Germany) Steffi Jones
MF	4	(Germany) Nia Künzer
MF	9	(Germany) Birgit Prinz (c)	(substituted off) 90'
MF	11	(Germany) Katrin Kliehm	(substituted off) 78'
FW	7	(Germany) Pia Wunderlich
FW	8	(Germany) Tina Wunderlich
FW	10	(Germany) Renate Lingor
Substitutes:
GK	16	(Germany) Barbara Legrand
GK	21	(Germany) Ursula Holl
DF	12	(Germany) Bianca Rech	(substituted on) 86'
DF	13	(Germany) Mira Krummenauer
MF	17	(Germany) Judith Affeld	(substituted on) 90'
FW	15	(Germany) Jennifer Meier	(substituted on) 78'
Manager:
Monika Staab

GK	1	(Sweden) Sofia Lundgren
DF	2	(Sweden) Anna Paulson
DF	4	(Sweden) Hanna Marklund
DF	5	(Sweden) Maria Bergkvist	(yellow card) 40'
DF	13	(Sweden) Sofia Eriksson
DF	18	(Sweden) Linda Dahlqvist
MF	3	(Sweden) Marlene Sjöberg
MF	6	(Sweden) Malin Moström (c)
MF	9	(Sweden) Anna Sjöström
MF	11	(Sweden) Lotta Runesson		(substituted off) 75'
FW	8	(Sweden) Terese Kapstad		(substituted off) 80'
Substitutes:
GK	20	(Sweden) Ulrika Karlsson
FW	7	(Sweden) Maria Nordbrandt		(substituted on) 75'
FW	16	(Sweden) Emma Lindqvist		(substituted on) 80'
Manager:
Richard Holmlund

Assistant referees:
Eivor Lehtiheimo (Finland)
Kirsi Savolainen (Finland)
Fourth official:
Anri Hänninen (Finland)

Match rules

- 90 minutes.
- 30 minutes of golden goal extra time if necessary.
- Penalty shoot-out if scores still level.
- Maximum of three substitutes.

== See also ==
- Played between same clubs:
- 2004 UEFA Women's Cup final
