= 2004 UEFA Women's Cup final =

2004 UEFA Women's Cup Final
- Event: 2003–04 UEFA Women's Cup
Umeå	Frankfurt
(Sweden)	(Germany)
8	0

First leg
Umeå	Frankfurt
3	0
- Date: 8 May 2004
- Venue: Råsunda, Solna
- Referee: Floarea Ionescu (Romania)
- Attendance: 5,409

Second leg
Frankfurt	Umeå
0	5
- Date: 5 June 2004
- Venue: Stadion am Bornheimer Hang, Frankfurt
- Referee: Claudine Brohet (Belgium)
- Attendance: 9,500

The 2004 UEFA Women's Cup Final was a two-legged football match that took place on 8 May and 5 June 2004 at Råsunda and Stadion am Bornheimer Hang between Umeå IK of Sweden and 1. FFC Frankfurt of Germany. It was the third time in a row that Umeå made an appearance in the final. Umeå won the final 8–0 on aggregate, avenging their defeat to the same team two years earlier.

== Match ==
=== Details ===
==== First leg ====
8 May 2004
15:00 CEST

Umeå (Sweden)	3–0	(Germany) Frankfurt
Marta 16', 58'; Östberg 49'	Report

Råsunda, Solna
Attendance: 5,409
Referee: Floarea Ionescu (Romania)

Umeå	Frankfurt

GK	1	(Sweden) Sofia Lundgren
DF	2	(Sweden) Anna Paulson
DF	4	(Sweden) Hanna Marklund
DF	5	(Sweden) Maria Bergkvist
DF	15	(Finland) Sanna Valkonen
MF	6	(Sweden) Malin Moström (c)
MF	9	(Sweden) Anna Sjöström	(substituted off) 73'
MF	87	(Sweden) Frida Östberg
FW	11	(Sweden) Marie Hammarström	(substituted off) 65'
FW	21	(Finland) Laura Kalmari	(substituted off) 86'
FW	60	(Brazil) Marta
Substitutes:
GK	22	(Sweden) Anna Hofwing
DF	13	(Sweden) Sofia Eriksson
DF	18	(Sweden) Linda Dahlkvist
MF	3	(Finland) Jessica Julin	(substituted on) 65'
FW	7	(Sweden) Maria Nordbrandt	(substituted on) 86'
FW	8	(Sweden) Therese Kapstad
FW	16	(Sweden) Emma Lindqvist	(substituted on) 73'
Manager:
(Sweden) Andrée Jeglertz

GK	1	(Netherlands) Marleen Wissink
DF	2	(Germany) Sandra Minnert
DF	3	(Denmark) Louise Hansen
DF	12	(Germany) Bianca Rech	(substituted off) 15'
DF	14	(Germany) Christina Zerbe
DF	22	(Germany) Steffi Jones	(substituted off) 66'
MF	9	(Germany) Birgit Prinz
MF	11	(Germany) Katrin Kliehm
MF	17	(Germany) Judith Affeld
FW	7	(Germany) Pia Wunderlich (c)
FW	8	(Germany) Tina Wunderlich
Substitutes:
GK	20	(Germany) Nathalie Altmann
DF	13	(Germany) Mira Krummenauer
DF	15	(Germany) Sabrina Rastetter
MF	6	(Germany) Marion Wilmes
MF	24	(Germany) Silvana Arcangioli	(substituted on) 66'
FW	18	(Germany) Patricia Barucha
FW	19	(Germany) Stefanie Weichelt	(substituted on) 15'
Manager:
(Germany) Monika Staab

Assistant referees:
Irina Mirt (Romania)
Fevronia Ion (Romania)
Fourth official:
Anna Nyström (Sweden)

Match rules

- 90 minutes.
- 30 minutes of golden goal extra time if necessary.
- Penalty shoot-out if scores still level.
- Seven named substitutes.
- Maximum of three substitutes.

=== Second leg ===
5 June 2004
14:30 CEST

Frankfurt (Germany)	0–5	(Sweden) Umeå
	Report	Marta 27'; Östberg 45+2'; Sjöström 49', 70'; Moström 68'

Stadion am Bornheimer Hang, Frankfurt
Attendance: 9,500
Referee: Claudine Brohet (Belgium)

Frankfurt	Umeå

GK	1	(Netherlands) Marleen Wissink
DF	2	(Germany) Sandra Minnert
DF	3	(Denmark) Louise Hansen
DF	14	(Germany) Christina Zerbe
DF	22	(Germany) Steffi Jones	(substituted off) 78'
MF	9	(Germany) Birgit Prinz
MF	11	(Germany) Katrin Kliehm
FW	10	(Germany) Renate Lingor	(substituted off) 59'
FW	7	(Germany) Pia Wunderlich (c)
FW	8	(Germany) Tina Wunderlich	(substituted off) 70'
FW	19	(Germany) Stefanie Weichelt
Substitutes:
GK	16	(Germany) Barbara Legrand
DF	13	(Germany) Mira Krummenauer	(substituted on) 70'
DF	15	(Germany) Sabrina Rastetter
MF	6	(Germany) Marion Wilmes
MF	17	(Germany) Judith Affeld	(substituted on) 59'
MF	24	(Germany) Silvana Arcangioli
FW	21	(Germany) Sandra Albertz	(substituted on) 78'
Manager:
(Germany) Monika Staab

GK	1	(Sweden) Sofia Lundgren
DF	2	(Sweden) Anna Paulson		(substituted off) 76'
DF	4	(Sweden) Hanna Marklund
DF	5	(Sweden) Maria Bergkvist	(yellow card) 36'
DF	15	(Finland) Sanna Valkonen
MF	3	(Finland) Jessica Julin
MF	6	(Sweden) Malin Moström (c)
MF	9	(Sweden) Anna Sjöström
MF	87	(Sweden) Frida Östberg
FW	21	(Finland) Laura Kalmari		(substituted off) 66'
FW	60	(Brazil) Marta		(substituted off) 77'
Substitutes:
GK	20	(Sweden) Ulrika Karlsson
DF	13	(Sweden) Sofia Eriksson		(substituted on) 77'
DF	14	(Sweden) Kristina Wiklund
DF	18	(Sweden) Linda Dahlkvist
FW	7	(Sweden) Maria Nordbrandt		(substituted on) 76'
FW	11	(Sweden) Marie Hammarström
FW	16	(Sweden) Emma Lindqvist		(substituted on) 66'
Manager:
(Sweden) Andrée Jeglertz

Assistant referees:
Chantal Raepers (Belgium)
Veronique Geerts (Belgium)

Match rules

- 90 minutes.
- 30 minutes of golden goal extra time if necessary.
- Penalty shoot-out if scores still level.
- Seven named substitutes.
- Maximum of three substitutes.

== See also ==
- Played between same clubs:
- 2002 UEFA Women's Cup final
