= 2003 FIFA Women's World Cup final =

Final association football match of the 2003 FIFA Women's World Cup

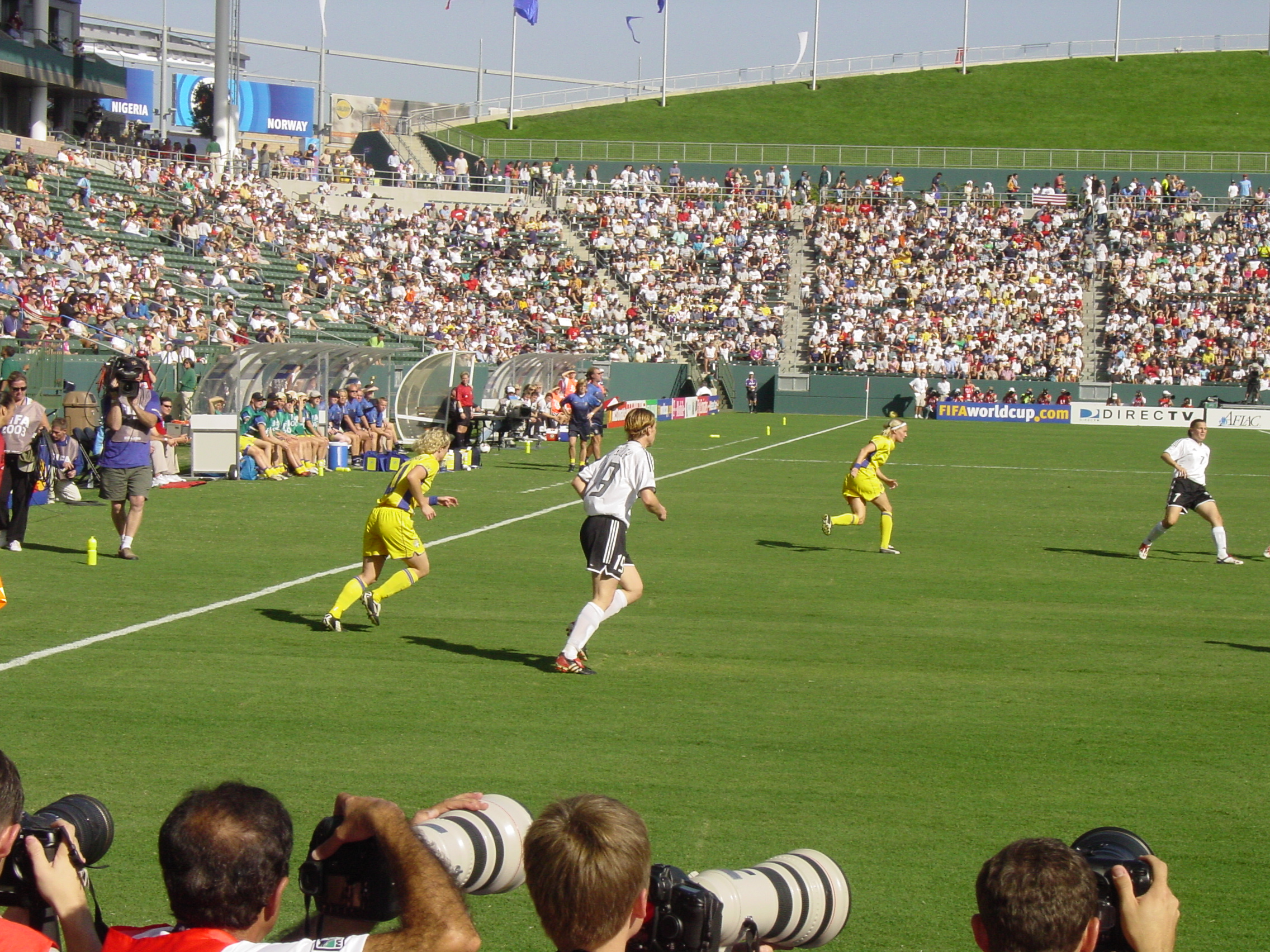
- View of the match from the stands
- Event: 2003 FIFA Women's World Cup
| Germany | Sweden |
| 2 | 1 |
- After golden goal extra time
- Date: October 12, 2003
- Venue: Home Depot Center, Carson
- Player of the Match: Bettina Wiegmann (Germany)
- Referee: Cristina Ionescu (Romania)
- Attendance: 26,137

The 2003 FIFA Women's World Cup final was an association football match which determined the winner of the 2003 FIFA Women's World Cup, contested by the women's national teams of the member associations of FIFA. It was played on October 12, 2003, and won by Germany, who defeated Sweden 2–1 in extra time.

The tournament was hosted on short notice by the United States, following the withdrawal of China due to an outbreak of SARS, and the final was hosted at the Home Depot Center, a small soccer-specific stadium in Carson, California, near Los Angeles. Both finalists had finished at the top of their groups in European qualification and met at the final of the 2001 UEFA Women's Championship, which Germany won. Germany entered the match as favorites, having finished atop Group C and achieving an upset victory against defending champions United States in the semi-finals. Sweden had emerged from the "group of death" by finishing second behind the United States and defeated Brazil and Canada in the earlier knockout stages.

Sweden went into half-time with a 1–0 lead after a goal by Hanna Ljungberg, but conceded an equalizing goal to Germany early in the second half that was scored by Maren Meinert. The match remained tied at 1–1 and was decided by Nia Künzer's golden goal header in the eighth minute of extra time. Künzer's header was the last golden goal to be scored in an official international match. Germany went on to win a bronze medal at the 2004 Summer Olympics by defeating Sweden and repeated as World Cup champions in 2007 against Brazil.

== Background ==
The 2003 final marked the twelfth meeting between Germany and Sweden in international women's football and the third time in a FIFA Women's World Cup match. The two teams met in the 1995 and 2001 finals of the UEFA Women's Championship, which were both won by Germany. Germany had won six of their previous matches against Sweden and lost the remaining five, including a 2–1 loss in their most recent meeting at the 2002 Algarve Cup. Germany had previously finished as runners-up in the 1995 FIFA Women's World Cup, while Sweden finished third in 1991 by defeating the Germans in the consolation match.

== Route to the final ==
Germany
Round
Sweden
Opponent
Result
Group stage
Opponent
Result
Canada
4–1
Match 1
United States
1–3
Japan
3–0
Match 2
North Korea
1–0
Argentina
6–1
Match 3
Nigeria
3–0
Group C winners

| Pos | Team | Pld | Pts |
|---|---|---|---|
| 1 | Germany | 3 | 9 |
| 2 | Canada | 3 | 6 |
| 3 | Japan | 3 | 3 |
| 4 | Argentina | 3 | 0 |

Source: FIFA
Final standings
Group A runners-up

| Pos | Team | Pld | Pts |
|---|---|---|---|
| 1 | United States (H) | 3 | 9 |
| 2 | Sweden | 3 | 6 |
| 3 | North Korea | 3 | 3 |
| 4 | Nigeria | 3 | 0 |

Source: FIFA
(H) Hosts
Opponent
Result
Knockout stage
Opponent
Result
Russia
7–1
Quarterfinals
Brazil
2–1
United States
3–0
Semifinals
Canada
2–1

=== Germany ===
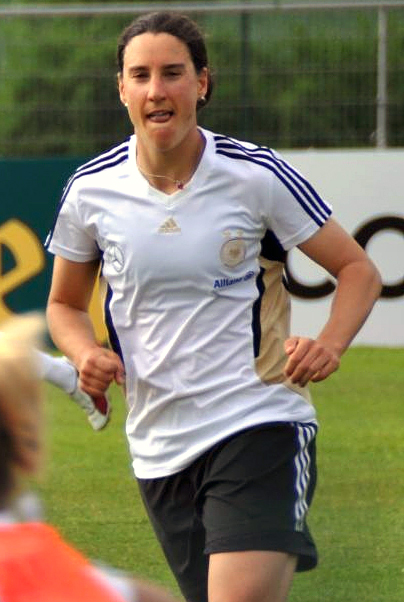
Birgit Prinz provided Germany with 7 goals and 5 assists during the 2003 Women's World Cup

Germany qualified by topping Group 4, finishing with six wins, 30 goals scored, and one goal conceded. They were placed in Group C alongside South American runners-up Argentina, North American runners-up Canada, and inter-continental play-off winner Japan. The team, managed by Tina Theune-Meyer and named an early favorite prior to the tournament, usually played in a 4–5–1 formation with Birgit Prinz or a 4–4–2 with Prinz and another striker, supported by Bettina Wiegmann leading the midfield and a roster of younger talent. Germany conceded in the fourth minute of its opening match to Canada's Christine Sinclair, who headed in a free kick, but equalized before half-time from a penalty kick awarded for a handball and taken by Wiegmann. The Germans took the lead early in the second half on a header by Stefanie Gottschlich in the 47th minute, which was followed by goals by Birgit Prinz and substitute Kerstin Garefrekes to win 4–1.

The team won 3–0 in their second match against Japan, taking first place in Group C with six points, by using its physical advantage and sustained attacks. Sandra Minnert scored in the 23rd minute on a rebound and was followed by strikes from Prinz in the 36th and 66th minutes. Germany advanced to the knockout stage atop Group C by defeating Argentina 6–1 in their third match, earning nine points and outscoring opponents 13–2. The rout of Argentina began in the third minute with a goal for Maren Meinert, which was followed by another for her, a penalty for Wiegmann, and a half-volley for Prinz in the first half. The team lost defender Steffi Jones to a knee injury in the second half and conceded a consolation goal to Argentina before scoring twice at the end of the match to extend their lead.

Germany played in the quarter-finals against Russia, runners-up of Group D, at PGE Park in Portland, Oregon. The team led 1–0 at half-time, following a goal by Martina Müller in the 25th minute, due to the strong defense offered by the Russians. Germany broke through early in the second half and scored thrice in a five-minute span, including strikes by Minnert, substitute Pia Wunderlich, and Garefrekes. Russia scored a consolation goal in the 70th minute, but Germany scored another trio of goals in the last ten minutes—one more from Garefrekes and two from Prinz.

In the semi-finals, Germany faced the United States and defeated them 3–0 in a major upset of the defending champions and hosts. Kerstin Garefrekes's header off a corner kick in the 15th minute opened the scoring for the Germans, while the United States responded by switching to an attack-minded 3–4–3 in the second half and squandered several chances to equalize, forcing saves out of goalkeeper Silke Rottenberg. The Americans pushed forward and left themselves open to counter-attacks, conceding two goals in stoppage time on breakaways that were scored by Meinert and Prinz.

=== Sweden ===
Sweden finished first in Group 2, winning five matches and losing one with a 27–4 goal differential to best runners-up Denmark. They played in Group A, which was dubbed the "group of death" for the strong lineup of defending world champions and hosts United States, African champions Nigeria, and Asian champions North Korea. Sweden lost 3–1 in their opening match against the United States in Washington, D.C., conceding twice in the first half to goals scored by Kristine Lilly and Cindy Parlow, both assisted by Mia Hamm. The lead was cut to 2–1 in the 55th minute by Victoria Sandell Svensson, who finished a long pass from Hanna Ljungberg, but American forward Shannon Boxx scored in the 78th minute to give the hosts a victory.

Four days later in Philadelphia, Sweden defeated North Korea 1–0 with an early goal scored by Svensson in the seventh minute, tying them for second place in the group. Sweden finished second in Group A and advanced to the quarter-finals after their 3–0 victory over Nigeria in Columbus, Ohio, scoring all three goals in the second half. Ljungberg scored twice in the 56th and 79th minutes, the former a header and latter a shot off a pass by Therese Sjögran, and captain Malin Moström scored in the 81st minute on a breakaway.

In the quarter-finals at Gillette Stadium, Sweden faced Brazil, who had previously defeated them in the 1995 World Cup and 2000 Summer Olympics. Svensson opened the scoring on a counterattack in the 23rd minute, but Brazil equalized before half-time through a penalty kick taken by Marta after she was tripped by goalkeeper Sofia Lundgren, who had replaced starting goalkeeper Caroline Jönsson. Sweden were awarded a free kick 24 yards (22 m) from the goal in the 53rd minute, which was converted into a goal by Malin Andersson, while the team resisted several chances from Brazil to defeat them 2–1.

The Swedes then played in the semi-finals against Canada, who had earned an upset victory over China in the quarter-finals. The match remained scoreless in the first half and the deadlock was broken in the 64th minute by Canadian midfielder Kara Lang, who took a free kick from 35 yards (32 m) that slipped out of the hands of Jönsson and spun into the goal. Swedish manager Marika Domanski-Lyfors used all three of her substitutions to bring on more attackers, and the equalizer was scored in the 79th minute by Malin Moström from a free kick. Substitute forward Josefine Öqvist scored the winning goal for Sweden six minutes later, finishing a rebound off a shot by Hanna Ljungberg that was saved by goalkeeper Taryn Swiatek.

== Venue ==
The 2003 final was played at the Home Depot Center, a 27,000-seat stadium in the Los Angeles suburb of Carson, California. The stadium was opened on June 7, 2003, as one of the first American venues to be designed primarily for soccer, serving as the home of the Los Angeles Galaxy of Major League Soccer (MLS). The final was originally planned to take place at Hongkou Football Stadium in Shanghai, China, but the tournament was moved to the United States after China's withdrawal in April 2003 due to the outbreak of SARS. The Home Depot Center was chosen in June to host four matches during the group stage, the third place play-off, and the final. The Home Depot Center was also selected as the host of the MLS Cup in 2003 and 2004.

== Match ==
=== Summary ===
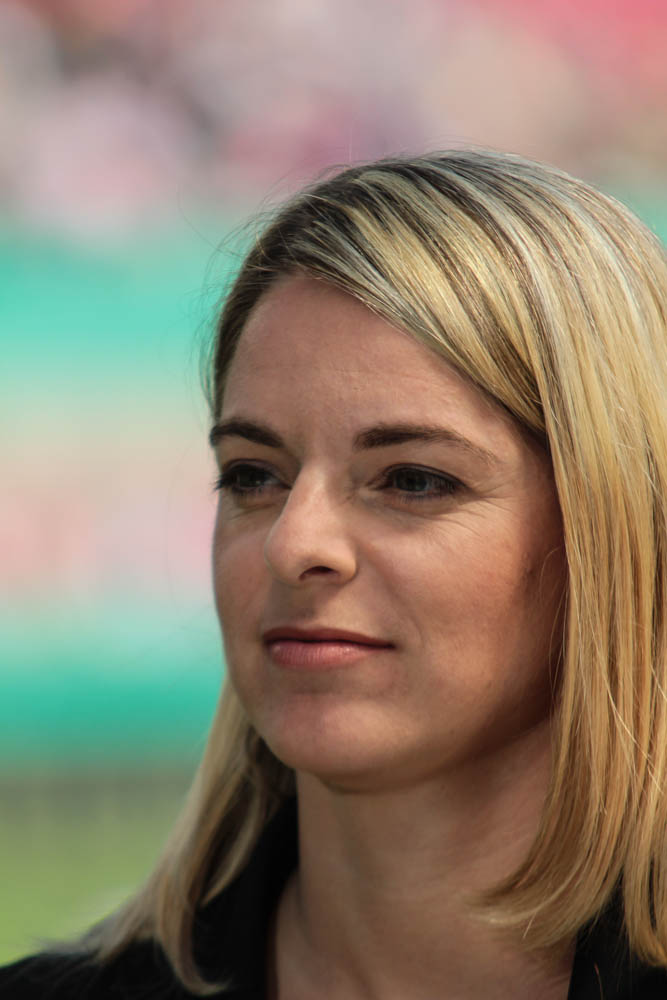
German defender Nia Künzer scored the extra time golden goal to win the 2003 Women's World Cup

In the lead-up to the final, Germany were named slight favorites due to their strong midfielders and high goalscoring during the tournament's earlier rounds. Both teams played with 4–4–2 formations to begin the match, but Germany deployed one of its attackers in a deeper position instead of in tandem up top. Romanian match official Floarea Cristina Ionescu was selected as the referee for the final.

Sweden held the majority of possession in the first half, winning more duels in the midfield and earning several chances to score. Germany largely counterattacked while trying to cover gaps in their midfield that also left their attackers isolated. Swedish striker Victoria Svensson and German striker Brigit Prinz each had two chances to score near the half-hour mark, forcing saves out of Silke Rottenberg and Caroline Jönsson, respectively. Malin Andersson attempted a half-volley from 25 yards (23 m) in the 30th minute and beat Rottenberg, but the shot went over the crossbar. The opening goal was scored in the 41st minute by Swedish playmaker Hanna Ljungberg, who collected a through pass from Victoria Svensson and shot past Rottenberg from 15 yards (14 m).

Germany kicked off the second half by scoring an equalizing goal within 40 seconds through a strike in the penalty area by Maren Meinert. Kerstin Garefrekes intercepted a pass in the Swedish half and passed it to Prinz, who provided a diagonal ball to Meinert near the edge of the penalty area. Sweden substituted two midfielders and responded by retreating into a defensive stance while allowing Ljungberg and Svensson to use their pace to create chances. Germany, emboldened by the goal and with control of the game's pace by midfielder Bettina Wiegmann, pushed forward to find more chances. In the 58th minute, they were denied a penalty after Garefrekes was tripped in the box by defender Jane Törnqvist.

Near the end of regulation time, Ljungberg created three chances to regain Sweden's lead that were missed or saved. Her first attempt in the 81st minute was mishit while open in the box and fell to Frida Östberg, who headed the ball into the side-netting. Ljungberg's second try was shot directly at Rottenberg, while the third was intercepted by two German defenders who collided with her. Ljungberg then headed an overhead ball that fell to Svensson, who volleyed it from 20 yards (18 m) only to miss. The match remained tied at 1–1 and advanced into sudden death extra time as the two sides traded chances to score with end-to-end play. Referee Floarea Cristina Ionescu awarded a free kick from 35 yards (32 m) after Kerstin Stegemann fell during a challenge from Svensson. Renate Lingor's free kick in the 98th minute found Nia Künzer, a second-half substitute and among the shortest players on the field, who leapt above Kristin Bengtsson to score the match's golden goal with her header. Germany celebrated their 2–1 victory by singing a version of Guantanamera, while Sweden manager Marika Domanski Lyfors confronted Ionescu about her controversial free kick call.

=== Details ===
October 12, 2003
10:00 am PDT

| Germany | 2–1 (a.e.t./g.g.) | Sweden |
|---|---|---|
| Meinert 46'; Künzer 98' | Report | Ljungberg 41' |

Home Depot Center, Carson
Attendance: 26,137
Referee: Cristina Ionescu (Romania)

| Germany | Sweden |

| GK | 1 | Silke Rottenberg |
| RB | 2 | Kerstin Stegemann |
| CB | 17 | Ariane Hingst |
| CB | 13 | Sandra Minnert |
| LB | 19 | Stefanie Gottschlich |
| RM | 18 | Kerstin Garefrekes | (substituted off) 76' |
| CM | 10 | Bettina Wiegmann (c) |
| CM | 6 | Renate Lingor |
| LM | 7 | Pia Wunderlich | (substituted off) 88' |
| SS | 14 | Maren Meinert |
| CF | 9 | Birgit Prinz |
Substitutions:
| FW | 11 | Martina Müller | (substituted on) 76' |
| DF | 4 | Nia Künzer | (substituted on) 88' |
Manager:
Tina Theune-Meyer

| GK | 1 | Caroline Jönsson |
| RB | 4 | Hanna Marklund |
| CB | 2 | Karolina Westberg |
| CB | 3 | Jane Törnqvist |
| LB | 7 | Sara Larsson | (substituted off) 76' |
| RM | 9 | Malin Andersson | (substituted off) 53' |
| CM | 6 | Malin Moström (c) |
| CM | 18 | Frida Östberg |
| LM | 17 | Anna Sjöström | (substituted off) 53' |
| CF | 10 | Hanna Ljungberg |
| CF | 11 | Victoria Svensson |
Substitutions:
| MF | 14 | Linda Fagerström | (substituted on) 53' |
| MF | 15 | Therese Sjögran | (substituted on) 53' |
| DF | 5 | Kristin Bengtsson | (substituted on) 76' |
Manager:
Marika Domanski-Lyfors

Match officials

- Assistant referees:
  - Irina Mirt (Romania)
  - Katarzyna Wierzbowska (Poland)
- Fourth official: Sonia Denoncourt (Canada)

== Post-match ==
Germany became the first team to surpass the United States at the top of the FIFA Women's World Rankings, which had been established just prior to the World Cup. German captain Bettina Wiegmann and forward Maren Meinert both retired after the match. Künzer's header was the last golden goal to decide an official international match, as the rule had been phased out by FIFA. It was also named the 2003 Goal of the Year by a poll of Sportschau readers, becoming the first women's goal to be featured.

The two finalists went on to meet again in the bronze medal match at the 2004 Summer Olympics, which Germany won 1–0. Germany became the first team to win consecutive Women's World Cups, defeating Brazil 2–0 in the 2007 final played in Shanghai.

== See also ==
- Germany at the FIFA Women's World Cup
- Sweden at the FIFA Women's World Cup
