= Therese Sjögran =

Swedish footballer (born 1977)

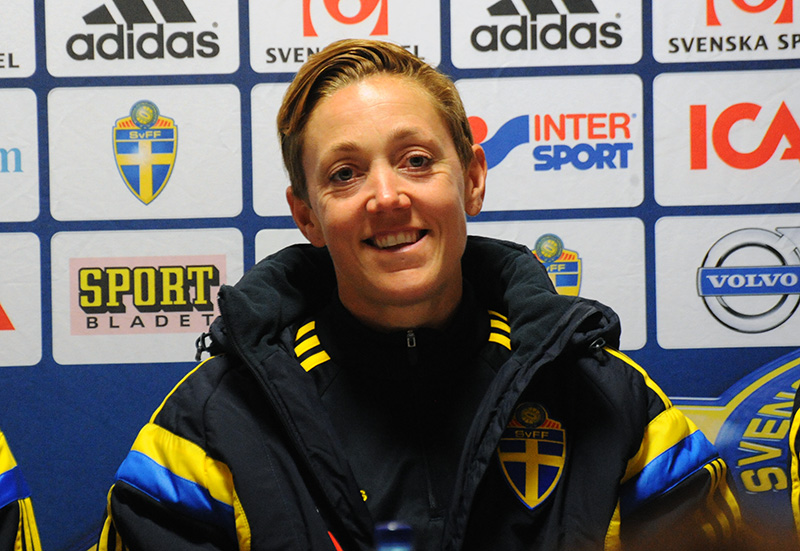
- Sjögran in 2014

Personal information
- Full name: Kerstin Ingrid Therese Sjögran
- Date of birth: 8 April 1977 (age 49)
- Place of birth: Södra Sandby, Sweden
- Height: 1.70 m (5 ft 7 in)
- Position: Midfielder

Youth career
- 1983–1989: Harlösa IF
- 1989–1991: Veberöds AIF

Senior career*
Years	Team	Apps	(Gls)
1991–1996	Veberöds AIF		
1997–1998	Wä IF		
1999–2000	Kristianstad/Wä DFF		
2001–2010	Malmö		
2011	Sky Blue FC	13	(0)
2011–2015	Malmö	67	(15)

International career
1993	Sweden U16	2	(0)
1995–1997	Sweden U20	21	(8)
1997–2015	Sweden	214	(21)
Medal record
Women's football
Representing Sweden
FIFA Women's World Cup
Silver medal – second place	2003 United States	Team
Bronze medal – third place	2011 Germany	Team
UEFA Women's Championship
Silver medal – second place	2001 Germany	Team
- * Club domestic league appearances and goals

Kerstin Ingrid Therese Sjögran (born 8 April 1977) is a Swedish football manager and coach, and former player as a midfielder for Damallsvenskan club FC Rosengård and the Sweden national team. A modern pioneer and source of inspiration in women's football, she is considered one of the greatest Swedish footballers of all time and imagined by some as a possible future head coach for the national team. Nicknamed "Terre", Sjögran made her first Damallsvenskan appearances for Kristianstad/Wä DFF. She joined Malmö FF Dam in 2001 and remained with the club through its different guises as LdB FC and FC Rosengård. Sjögran spent the 2011 season with American Women's Professional Soccer (WPS) club Sky Blue FC.

Sweden's all-time record appearance holder, Sjögran is the first player to win 200 caps for Blågult and is tied with Birgit Prinz at 214 for the most capped European footballer in national teams. She made her national team debut in October 1997 and represented her country in the 2001, 2005, 2009 and 2013 editions of the UEFA Women's Championship, as well as at the 2003, 2007, 2011 and 2015 FIFA Women's World Cups. She also played at the 2000, 2004 and 2008 Olympic Football Tournaments, but missed out in 2012 due to injury. Sjögran twice won the Diamantbollen, the award for Sweden's female player of the year, in 2007 and 2010.

Today she is sporting director in Manchester City W.F.C.

== Club career ==
Sjögran began playing football with boys at Harlösa IF and moved on to Veberöds AIF at the age of 12. She has mentioned on several occasions as an adult that Jürgen Klinsmann was her greatest inspiration, whom she first saw in the 1990 World Cup. Aged 14, she was already playing for Veberöds' women's team in Division 3. After signing for Division 1 club Wä IF in 1997 Sjögran was part of the team promoted into the Damallsvenskan for the first time that year. She came to the attention of bigger clubs and joined Wä's local rivals Malmö FF Dam in 2001.

Malmö showed good form but were prevented from winning trophies by the dominant Umeå IK team of the era. With Sjögran playing as a left winger, the 2003 Svenska Cupen final finished Umeå 1–0 Malmö, after an extra time goal by Umeå's Hanna Ljungberg. In April 2005, Sjögran rejected advances from several rival clubs to extend her Malmö contract.

Consistent performances from Sjögran at Malmö saw her honoured as Sweden's female Midfielder of the Year in 2007 and 2008. In 2007, she won the Diamantbollen award for the best female footballer in the country.

In March 2009, Sjögran indicated her interest in playing in the English FA WSL, which was supposed to start the following year but was delayed. Later in 2009, she was picked in the American Women's Professional Soccer (WPS) International Draft by Atlanta Beat, but remained loyal to Malmö.

Inspired by 33-year-old Sjögran, Malmö won their first Damallsvenskan championship since 1994 in the 2010 season. It was delighted Sjögran's first league winner's medal after finishing in second place on five previous occasions. Sjögran won the Diamantbollen again in 2010. Her acceptance speech paid tribute to the influence of her step-father. A surprised Sjögran had expected Charlotte Rohlin to win the award.

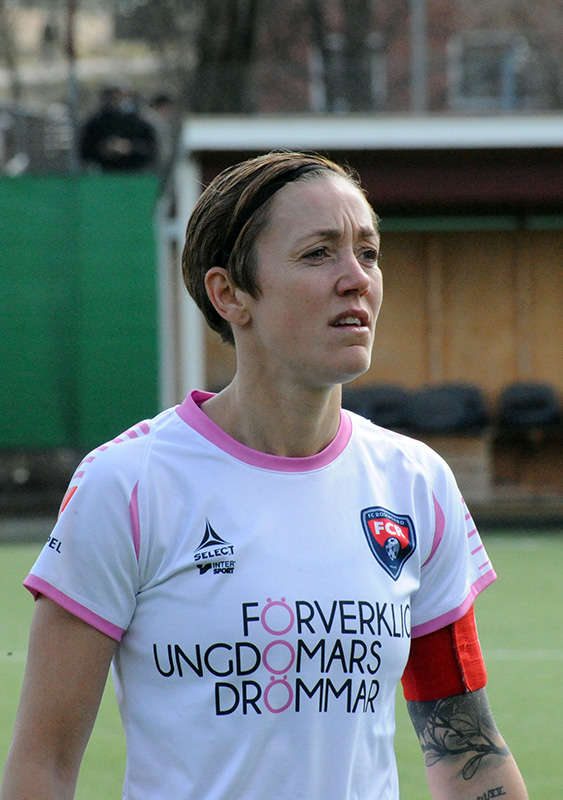
Sjögran playing for FC Rosengård

In December 2010 Malmö let Sjögran move to America, with WPS club Sky Blue FC. Sky Blue coach Jim Gabarra had made Sjögran one of his top transfer targets, describing her as "consistently exceptional". Sjögran played just 13 matches for Sky Blue, as the 2011 FIFA Women's World Cup was scheduled during the 2011 season. Starting 12 of the games, she posted six assists as Sky Blue finished fifth of six teams.

The deal had a clause that Sjögran would return to Malmö after the short American season. She helped Malmö retain their Damallsvenskan title in 2011 and represented the club in the 2011–12 UEFA Women's Champions League.

After a serious knee injury in May 2012, veteran Sjögran eventually returned to full fitness but found it difficult to break back into the starting line-up as Malmö were battling rivals Tyresö FF for the league title. Strong performances for the Swedish national team saw her win back her club place. Malmö and Sjögran won their third title in four seasons in 2013. She was happy to secure her third league winner's medal in October 2013, as Malmö beat Umeå IK 2–0 to take an unassailable six-point lead over Tyresö at the top of the table.

Sjögran signed a new contract with Malmö, now known as FC Rosengård, in May 2014. She wanted to remain with the club for the rest of her playing career. In June 2014 she was linked with a coaching role at the club. Sjögran helped Rosengård defend their title in 2014.

On 28 April 2015 Rosengård announced that Sjögran had been appointed as the club's next sporting director, starting 1 August, replacing Erling Nilsson (who would remain in the club as a "mentor") and that she intended to retire from playing after the summer's World Cup in Canada. On 21 May 2015 Sjögran played what seemed to be her final league game, but she didn't want to celebrate then. It was reported in July 2015 that Sjögran would play her 426th and final game for the club in their Svenska Cupen semi-final against Umeå. She was thanked and celebrated right before and after that match.

On 20 July Therese Sjögran hastily took over as head coach, meant temporarily, after Markus Tilly went on sick leave for family reasons. She didn't like it much. Shortly after, with Rosengård suffering a dip in form, having several players injured and star player Anja Mittag recently left the club, and locked in a title challenge with Eskilstuna United, Sjögran was pressed into another hastily endeavor, making a temporary playing comeback on 26 July despite having said just a few days earlier that she would not do so. On 1 August Rosengård announced they had signed with a new head coach, thus relieving Sjögran. Sjögran stepped in and played once more 5 August against Eskilstuna and on 9 August 2015, in the Svenska Cupen final against Linköping, a game Rosengård lost, this time promising it would definitely be her last time.

In the league Rosengård overcame the absence of coach Markus Tilly and the departure of star players Anja Mittag and Ramona Bachmann to secure their third successive title, with a final day 5–0 win over Linköpings FC.

Sjögran disclosed in an interview about a children's book based on her youth years, Rött kort, Therese!, that the only time she received a red card was in Veberöd after having practiced lately on sliding and tried to execute that in a match with bad result.

Sjögran made another temporary playing comeback on 7 February 2016 in a friendly against Manchester City, as FC Rosengård suffered many sick and injured players, but she was only in the technical area as a substitute and never actually played.

== International career ==
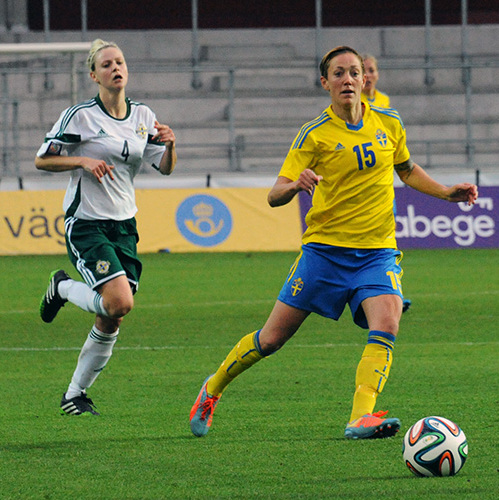
Sjögran (right) playing for Sweden

Sjögran made her first appearance for the senior Swedish national team on 30 October 1997; a 3–1 friendly defeat by the United States in Chattanooga, Tennessee. She was fast-tracked into the national team by coach Marika Domanski-Lyfors although she had not yet played in Sweden's top division. After some injury problems kept her out of club football, Sjögran was not selected for the 1999 FIFA Women's World Cup in the United States. She returned to the squad for the 2000 Sydney Olympics, but was mainly an understudy and was restricted to substitute appearances as Sweden crashed out in the first round.

Sjögran was a more established first team player by the time of UEFA Women's Euro 2001. She came on as a substitute in all Sweden's games except the final, which she started. Sweden lost 1–0 to Claudia Müller's golden goal for hosts Germany.

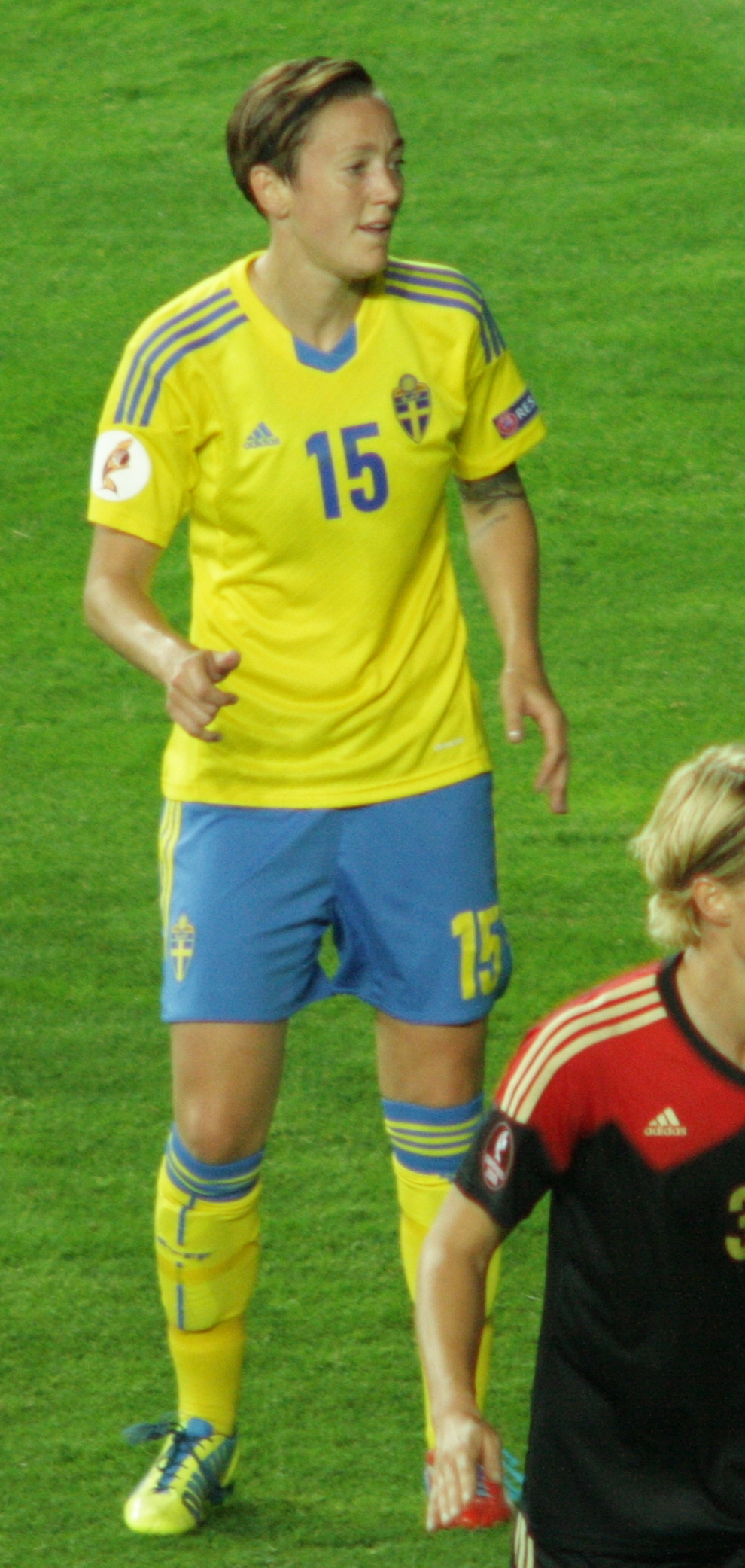
Sjögran playing for Sweden in their UEFA Women's Euro 2013 semi-final against Germany

At the 2003 FIFA Women's World Cup, Sjögran was substituted at half-time in Sweden's first match, a 3–1 loss to hosts the United States. She came on as a substitute in Sweden's remaining matches and won praise for her performance in the final, which Sweden again lost to Germany on a golden goal. In its tournament review, the Expressen newspaper described Sjögran as a talented enigma who seemed incapable of translating her best performances to the international stage.

Following the retirement of midfield star Malin Moström in late 2006, Sjögran was given a more prominent role by coach Thomas Dennerby. As part of the Sweden team surprisingly eliminated in the first round of the 2007 FIFA Women's World Cup, Sjögran was one of few Swedish players to emerge with any credit from the tournament. She also played a leading role as Sweden beat rivals Denmark in a qualification play-off for the following year's Olympics. In China 2008 she participated in the Swedes' 2–0 quarter-final defeat by Germany.

At the 2011 Algarve Cup Sjögran surpassed Victoria Sandell Svensson's national record of 166 caps, after playing in a 2–1 defeat to Japan. She marked the occasion by scoring her 17th international goal, direct from a free kick.

Experienced "elder stateswoman" Sjögran helped Sweden achieve third place at the 2011 FIFA Women's World Cup in Germany. She assisted Lisa Dahlqvist's winning goal against North Korea in the group stage, and started Sweden's 3–1 semi-final defeat to eventual winners Japan in Frankfurt. Sjögran played the whole match as Sweden secured third place by beating France 2–1 in Sinsheim.

Third place ensured Sweden's qualification for the 2012 Olympic football tournament in London. In May 2012, Sjögran tore her anterior cruciate ligament and was ruled out of the Olympics. Although she was aged 35, Sjögran did not consider retirement. She aimed to recover in time for UEFA Women's Euro 2013, which Sweden were hosting.

Incoming coach Pia Sundhage selected Sjögran in the Sweden squad for Euro 2013, admitting it was something of a gamble and demanding that Sjögran should expend "the last drop of sweat" to justify her place. Sjögran had not expected to be recalled and had even purchased tickets to attend the tournament as a supporter. At the final tournament Sjögran made substitute appearances in the 3–1 group win over Italy and the 1–0 defeat by Germany in the semi-final. Team-mate Lotta Schelin praised Sjögran's contribution, describing her as "an old gem".

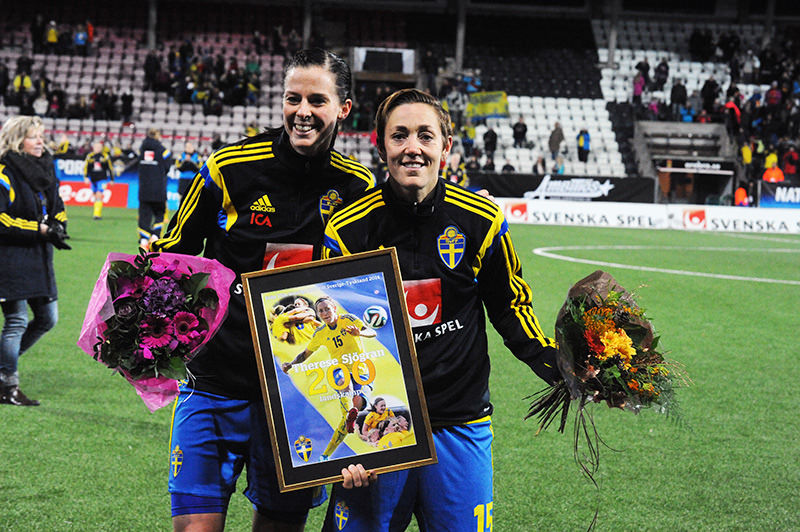
Sjögran (right) with Lotta Schelin on the occasion of Sjögran's 200th cap

In November 2013, the Swedish Football Association (SvFF) sparked a sexism scandal at its annual awards Fotbollsgalan when it presented Anders Svensson with a Volvo XC60 car for winning 146 caps. SvFF was widely criticised for failing to honour Sjögran, who had 187 caps. Afterwards SvFF claimed that they had planned to reward and celebrate Sjögran at a later occasion, but failed to properly inform internally. Chairman Karl-Erik Nilsson later regretted the decision, saying it would have been better if they paid tribute to Sjögran as well. Car manufacturers Peugeot and Citroën voluntarily on their own initiative offered to lend one of their newest models to Sjögran.

Coach Sundhage continued to select Sjögran for Sweden's successful 2015 FIFA Women's World Cup qualification campaign. She played alongside Lotta Schelin as a forward against Northern Ireland in Växjö, deputising for the injured Kosovare Asllani, a move that surprised some, as older players tend to get moved backward a bit and have a more defensive role. She scored the first goal. That was her 193rd game in the national team. In October 2014 Sjögran reached her 200th appearance for Sweden, in a 2–1 home friendly defeat by Germany. She became the first Swedish player to achieve the milestone and only the third European after Birgit Prinz and Katrine Pedersen.

In November 2014, SvFF again sparked a sexism scandal involving Therese Sjögran at Fotbollsgalan, this time in conjunction with TV4. There was a celebration planned and prepared for the ceremony for her achieving 200 caps, but it was cancelled in the middle of the show before it occurred because of time constraints.

At the 2015 FIFA Women's World Cup, Sjögran made her 214th and final appearance in Sweden's 4–1 round of 16 defeat by Germany, putting her in split first place with Birgit Prinz for most capped European footballer in national teams. She left the field with tears in her eyes and kept the match ball as a souvenir for her mother. Afterwards she felt empty and woeful having exited and quit that way with a heavy loss.

Before Fotbollsgalan 2015 Sjögran said she didn't want to be honoured this time, as she thought it was too late. But SvFF kept their plan and this time actually followed it though, rewarding her with Fotbollskanalens hederspris, The Football Channel's honorary award.

== Managerial career ==
Since 1 August 2015 Sjögran is sporting director in FC Rosengård.

== Personal life ==
In an interview made in 2005 before the European Championship Sjögran states that she would choose innebandy if she wouldn't play football. Her favourite food was shellfish, her favourite music was techno/house and her favourite movie was Saw. She thought Birgit Prinz was the best current player and that golfer Annika Sörenstam was the best Swedish athlete of all time. In a short interview made in 2013 she also mentioned table tennis as a secondary sports choice.

Economics graduate Sjögran took legal action when she was refused unemployment benefit on the grounds that her football career stopped her being available for work. She later worked part-time for the insurance company, Trygg-Hansa.

Sports journalist Anja Gatu wrote a fictional biographical children's book, with illustrations by Maria Borgelöv, about Sjögran's early years in Harlösa IF titled Rött kort, Therese! ("Red card, Therese!") in 2015. One and a half-year later Gatu wrote a sequel titled Snygg fint, Therese! ("Nice feint, Therese!").

Sjögran participated in SVT's 2017 season of Mästarnas mästare which was recorded in Algarve, Portugal in September 2016. She was once again miscredited for her deeds as SVT in a press release before a press gathering for the show had left out most of her merits and claimed that Anders Svensson was the most capped Swedish player. The car incident from Fotbollsgalan was supposedly brought up during recording of her recap in the show, but was ultimately cut from the broadcast.

She still played football regularly in 2016, but only in Swedish amateur league Korpen.

== Career statistics ==
=== Matches and goals scored at World Cup & Olympic tournaments ===
Key (expand for notes on "world cup and olympic goals")
Location	Geographic location of the venue where the competition occurred
Lineup	Start – played entire match on minute (off player) – substituted on at the minute indicated, and player was substituted off at the same time off minute (on player) – substituted off at the minute indicated, and player was substituted on at the same time (c) – captain
Min	The minute in the match the goal was scored. For list that include caps, blank indicates played in the match but did not score a goal.
Assist/pass	The ball was passed by the player, which assisted in scoring the goal. This column depends on the availability and source of this information.
penalty or pk	Goal scored on penalty-kick which was awarded due to foul by opponent. (Goals scored in penalty-shoot-out, at the end of a tied match after extra-time, are not included.)
Score	The match score after the goal was scored.
Result	The final score. W – match was won L – match was lost to opponent D – match was drawn (W) – penalty-shoot-out was won after a drawn match (L) – penalty-shoot-out was lost after a drawn match
aet	The score at the end of extra-time; the match was tied at the end of 90' regulation
pso	Penalty-shoot-out score shown in parentheses; the match was tied at the end of extra-time
	Pink background color – Olympic women's football tournament
	Blue background color – FIFA women's world cup final tournament

Goal	Match	Date	Location	Opponent	Lineup	Min	Score	Result	Competition
(Australia) Sydney 2000 Women's Olympic Football Tournament
	1	2000-9-13	Melbourne	Brazil	on 76' (off Svensson)			0–2 L	Group match
	2	2000-9-16	Sydney	Australia	on 54' (off Svensson)			1–1 D	Group match
	3	2000-9-19	Melbourne	Germany	on 46' (off Nordlund)			0–1 L	Group match
(United States) USA 2003 FIFA Women's World Cup
	4	2003-9-21	Washington, DC	United States	off 46' (on Östberg)			1–3 L	Group match
	5	2003-9-28	Columbus	Nigeria	on 66' (off Andersson)			3–0 W	Group match
	6	2003-10-1	Foxborough	Brazil	on 72' (off Andersson)			2–1 W	Quarter Final
	7	2003-10-5	Portland	Canada	on 70' (off Andersson)			2–1 W	Semi-Final
	8	2003-10-12	Carson	Germany	on 53' (off Andersson)			1–2 L	Final
(Greece) Athens 2004 Women's Olympic Football Tournament
	9	2004-8-11	Volos	Japan	off 84' (on Olsson)			0–1 L	Group match
	10	2004-8-17	Volos	Nigeria	off 46' (on Schelin)			2–1 W	Group match
	11	2004-8-20	Volos	Australia	off 71' (on Öqvist)			2–1 W	Quarter-Final
	12	2004-8-23	Patras	Brazil	off 72' (on Schelin)			0–1 L	Semi Final
	13	2004-8-26	Piraeus	Germany	on 43' (off Svensson)			0–1 L	Bronze Medal Match
China 2007 FIFA Women's World Cup
	14	2007-9-11	Chengdu	Nigeria	Start			1–1 D	Group match
	15	2007-9-14	Chengdu	United States	off 65' (on Fischer)			0–2 L	Group match
	16	2007-9-18	Tianjin	North Korea	Start			2–1 W	Group match
(China) Beijing 2008 Women's Olympic Football Tournament
	17	2008-8-6	Tianjin	China	off 83' (on Almgren)			1–2 L	Group match
	18	2008-8-9	Tianjin	Argentina	off 71' (on Forsberg)			1–0 W	Group match
	19	2008-8-12	Beijing	Canada	Start			2–1 W	Group match
	20	2008-8-15	Shenyang	Germany	off 110			0–2 L	Quarter-Final
Germany 2011 FIFA Women's World Cup
	21	2011-6-28	Leverkusen	Colombia	Start			1–0 W	Group match
	22	2011-7-2	Augsburg	North Korea	off 86' (on Fischer)			1–0 W	Group match
	23	2011-7-6	Wolfsburg	United States	off 65' (on Göransson)			2–1 W	Group match
1	24	2011-7-10	Augsburg	Australia	Start	11	1-0	3–1 W	Quarter-Final
	25	2011-7-13	Frankfurt	Japan	Start			1–3 L	Semi-Final
	26	2011-7-16	Sinsheim	France	Start			2–1 W	Third Place Match
Canada 2015 FIFA Women's World Cup
	27	2015-6-8	Winnipeg	Nigeria	Start			3–3 D	Group match
	28	2015-6-12	Winnipeg	United States	off 75' (on Appelqvist)			0–0 D	Group match
	29	2015-6-16	Edmonton	Australia	Start			1–1 D	Group match
	30	2015-6-20	Ottawa	Germany	Start			1–4 L	Round of 16

=== Matches and goals scored at European Championship tournaments ===
Goal	Match	Date	Location	Opponent	Lineup	Min	Score	Result	Competition
(Germany) 2001 European Championship
	1	2001-6-23	Erfurt	Germany	on 69' (off Flyborg)			1–3 L	Group match
	2	2001-6-27	Jena	England	on 71' (off Bengtsson)			4–0 W	Group match
	3	2001-7-4	Ulm	Denmark	on 63' (off Lundin)			1–0 W	Semi-Final
	4	2001-7-7	Ulm	Germany	off 70' (on Fagerström)			0–1 L	Final
(England) 2005 European Championship
	5	2005-6-5	Blackpool	Denmark	on 55' (off Seger)			1–1 D	Group match
	6	2005-6-8	Blackpool	Finland	off 71' (on Sjöström)			0–0 D	Group match
	7	2005-6-11	Blackburn	England	Start			1–0 W	Group match
	8	2005-6-16	Warrington	Norway	off 71' (on Öqvist)			2–3 L	Semi-Final
(Finland) 2009 European Championship
	9	2009-8-25	Turku	Russia	Start			3–0 W	Group match
	10	2009-8-28	Turku	Italy	off 89' (on Schillgard)			2–0 W	Group match
	11	2009-8-31	Turku	England	Start			1–1 D	Group match
	12	2009-9-4	Helsinki	Norway	Start			1–3 L	Quarter-Final
(Sweden) 2013 European Championship
	13	2013-7-16	Halmstad	Italy	on 46' (off Asllani)			3–1 W	Group match
	14	2013-7-24	Gothenburg	Germany	on 65' (off Göransson)			0–1 L	Semi-Final

== Honours ==
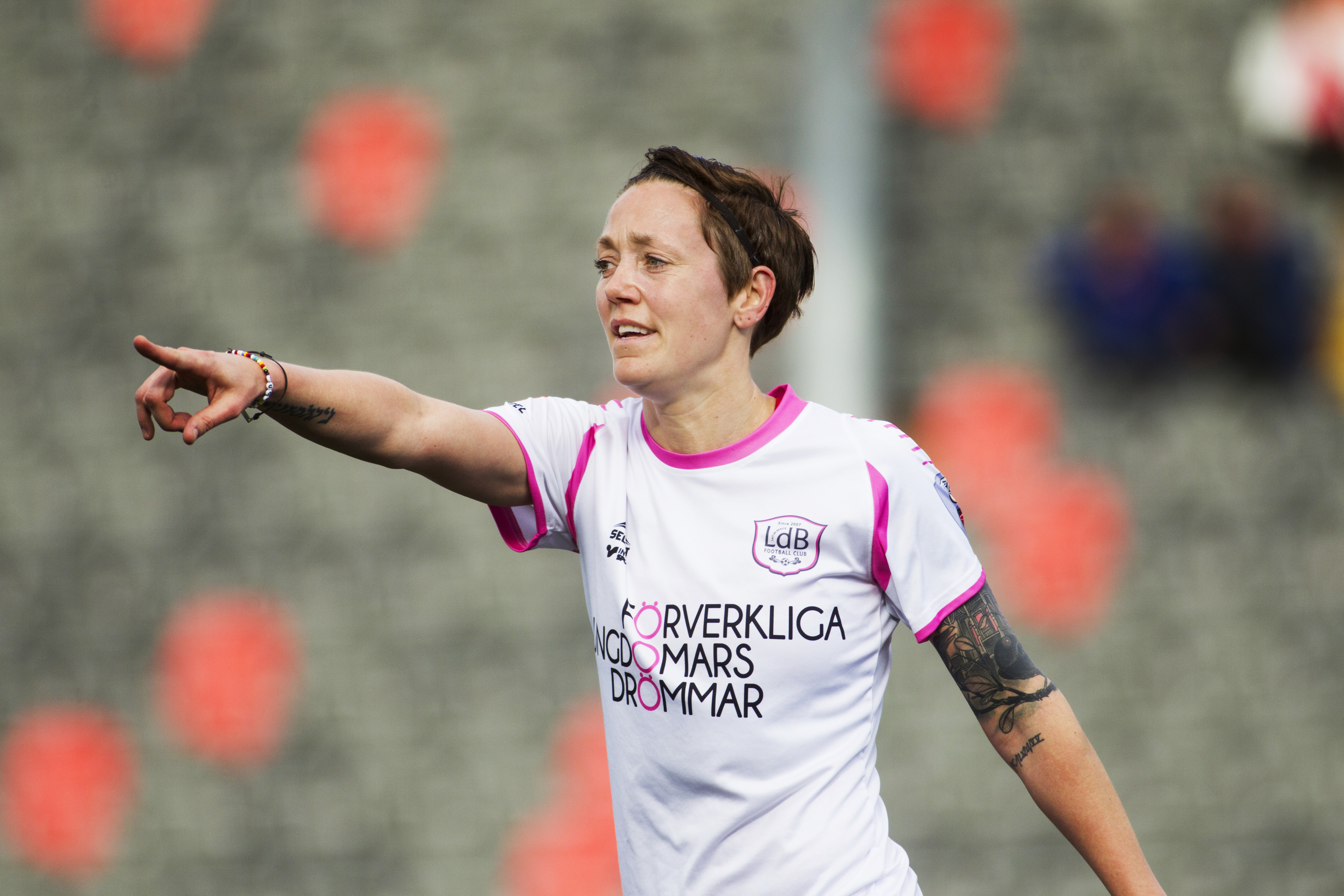
Sjögran playing for Malmö in May 2013

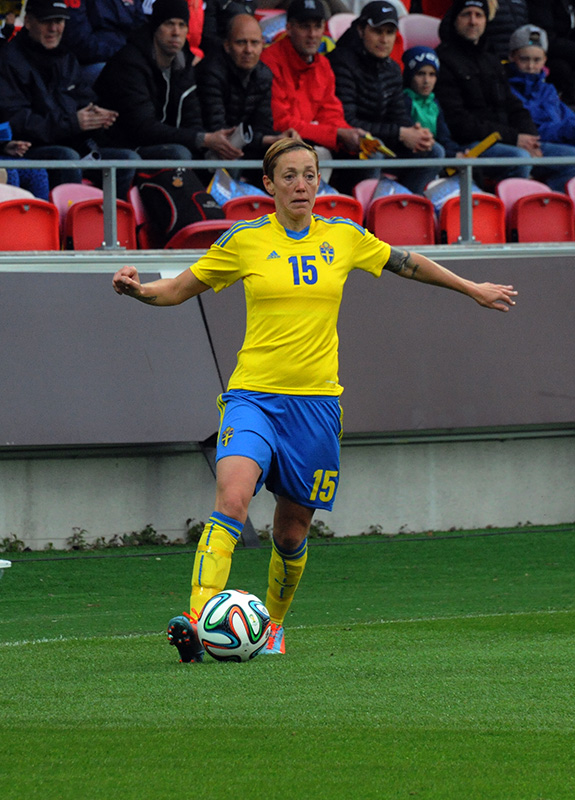
With Sweden in May 2014

Veberöds AIF

- Division 3: 1994

Wä FF

- Division 1: 1997

LdB FC Malmö/FC Rosengård

- Damallsvenskan: 2010, 2011, 2013, 2014, 2015
- Svenska Supercupen: 2011, 2012, 2015

Sweden

- FIFA Women's World Cup: runner-up 2003; third place 2011
- UEFA Women's Euro: runner-up 2001
- Algarve Cup: 2001, 2009
- Australia Cup: 2003

Individual

- Best female player in Sweden: 2007, 2010
- Best female midfielder in Sweden: 2007, 2008
- Soccer Channel special prize: 2015
