= Emma Wilhelmsson =

Swedish footballer

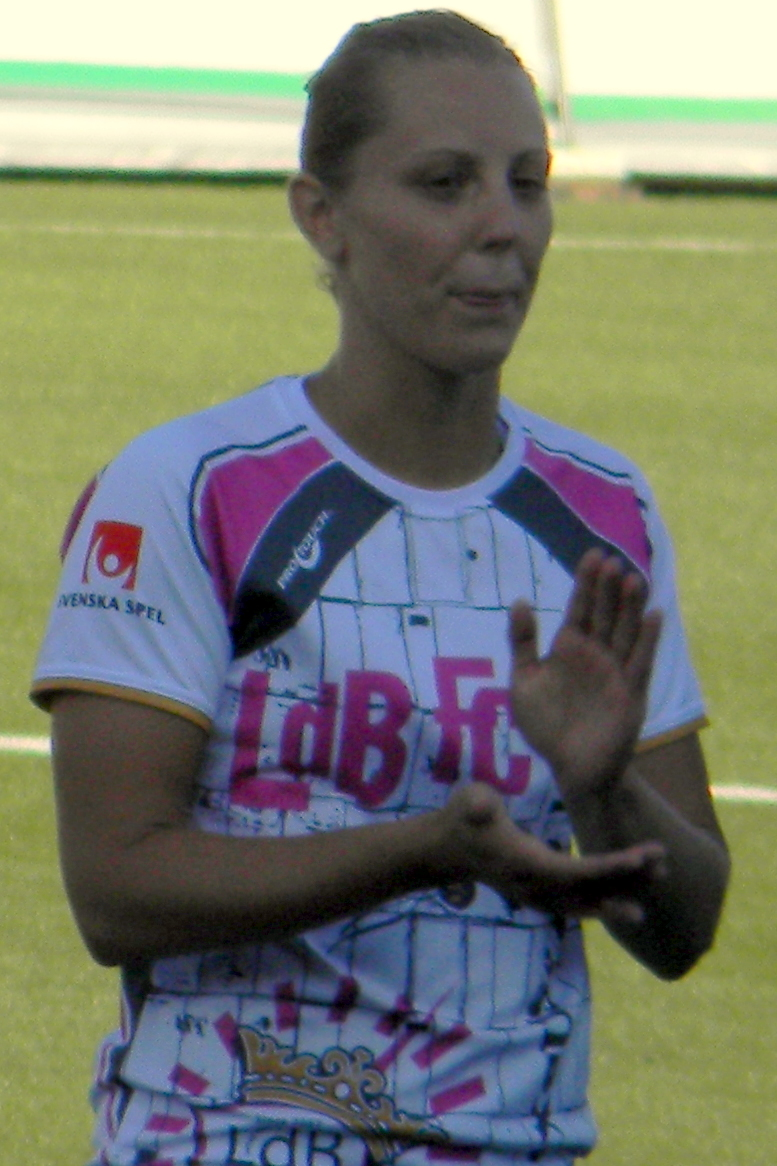
- Wilhelmsson in 2011

Personal information
- Date of birth: 31 May 1986 (age 40)
- Position: Defender

Emma Wilhelmsson (31 May 1986) is a Swedish former football player who played as a defender for Chelsea and Jitex BK.

== International career ==
Wilhelmsson has represented Sweden at youth level.
