= Emma Lindqvist =

Swedish handball player (born 1997)

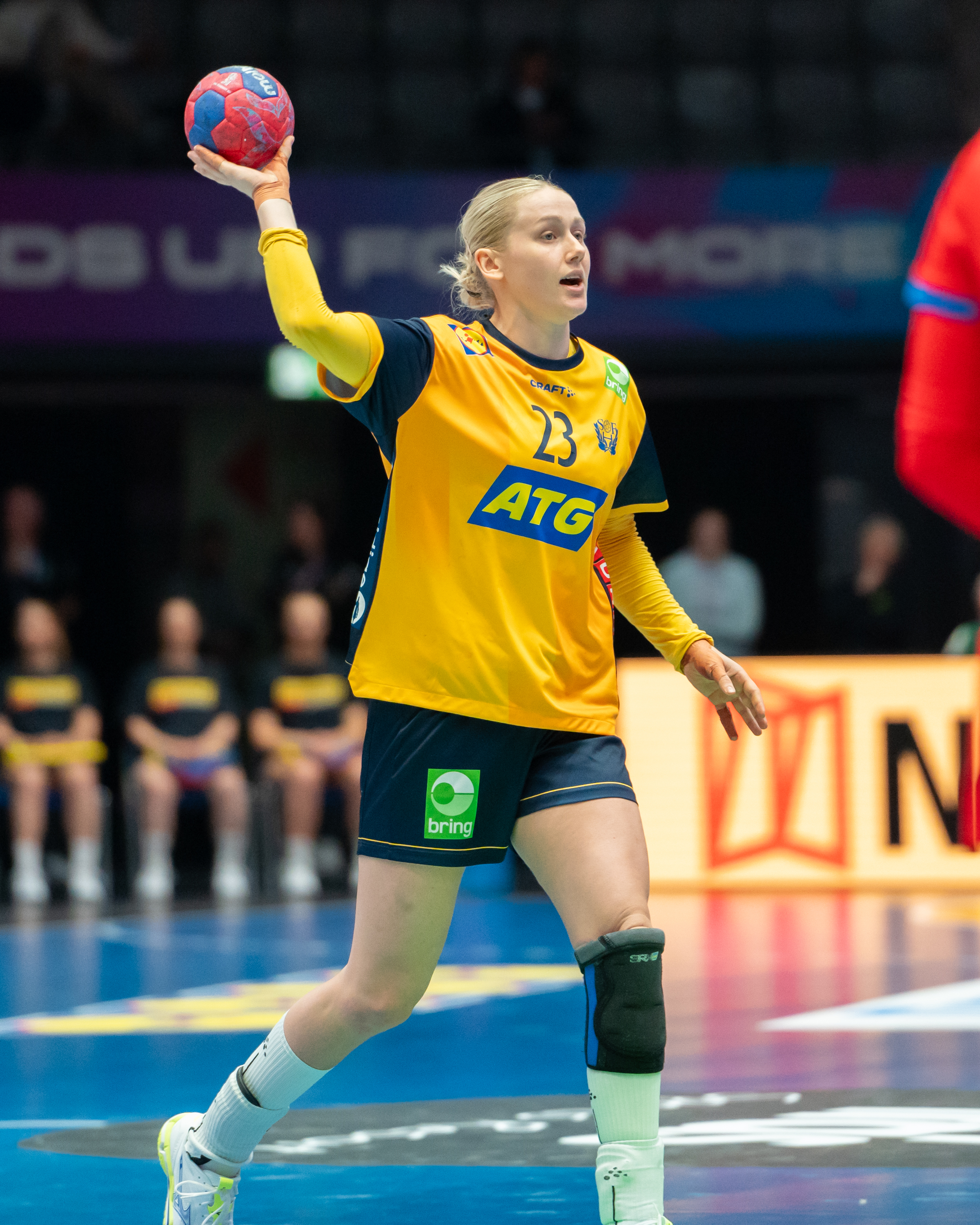

Personal information
- Nationality: Swedish
- Born: 17 September 1997 (age 29) Helsingborg, Sweden
- Height: 1.77 m (5 ft 10 in)

Sport
- Sport: Handball
- Position: Centre back
- Current club: Ikast Håndbold

Senior clubs
- Years: Team
- 2016–2021: H 65 Höörs HK
- 2021–: Ikast Håndbold
National team
Years	Team	Apps	(Gls)
2018–	Sweden	109	(249)
Medal record
Youth Olympic Games
Bronze medal – third place	2014 Nanjing

Emma Lindqvist (born 17 September 1997) is a Swedish handball player for Ikast Håndbold and the Swedish national team.

She represented Sweden at the 2019 World Women's Handball Championship.

== Achievements ==
- EHF European League:
  - Winner: 2023
- Swedish Elitserien:
  - Winner: 2017
  - Runner-up: 2018, 2021
