= Tina Wunderlich =

German footballer

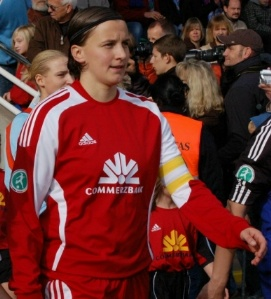

Personal information
- Full name: Tina Wunderlich
- Date of birth: 10 October 1977 (age 49)
- Place of birth: Bad Berleburg, West Germany
- Height: 1.77 m (5 ft 9 1/2 in)
- Position: Defender

Youth career
- 1982–1989: TuS Schwarzenau
- 1989–1991: TSV Battenberg

Senior career*
Years	Team	Apps	(Gls)
1991–1994	TSV Battenberg		
1994–2010	1. FFC Frankfurt		

International career^{‡}
1994–2003	Germany	34	(0)
Medal record
Women's football
Representing Germany
Olympic Games
Bronze medal – third place	2000 Sydney	Team competition
- * Club domestic league appearances and goals ‡ National team caps and goals as of 28 May 2007

Tina Wunderlich (born 10 October 1977) is a German former football defender. She played for 1. FFC Frankfurt, and was capped for the Germany women's national football team.

== Club career ==
Wunderlich retired from football in 2010, after a long career with 1. FFC Frankfurt which yielded seven Frauen Bundesliga titles and seven Frauen DFB Pokal cups. She also collected winners' medals in three editions of what is now the UEFA Women's Champions League.

== International career ==
She made her debut for the senior Germany national team on 25 September 1994, in an 11–0 destruction of Switzerland in Weingarten. In 1995 she was part of the German squad which finished runners – up in the Women's World Cup, playing in one match against Brazil. During the course of her 34–cap international career, Wunderlich also played in the 1999 Women's World Cup, won a bronze medal at the 2000 Olympic Games and was part of the victorious UEFA Women's Euro 2001 squad. Her final appearance came against China in March 2003. Sister Pia also played in the match.

== Honours ==
=== Club ===
1. FFC Frankfurt

- UEFA Women's Cup (3): 2002, 2006, 2008
- Frauen Bundesliga (7): 1999, 2001, 2002, 2003, 2005, 2007, 2008
- Frauen DFB Pokal (7): 1999, 2000, 2001, 2002, 2003, 2007, 2008

=== International ===
Germany

- UEFA Women's Championship (1): 2001
