= Johanna Almgren =

Swedish footballer (born 1984)

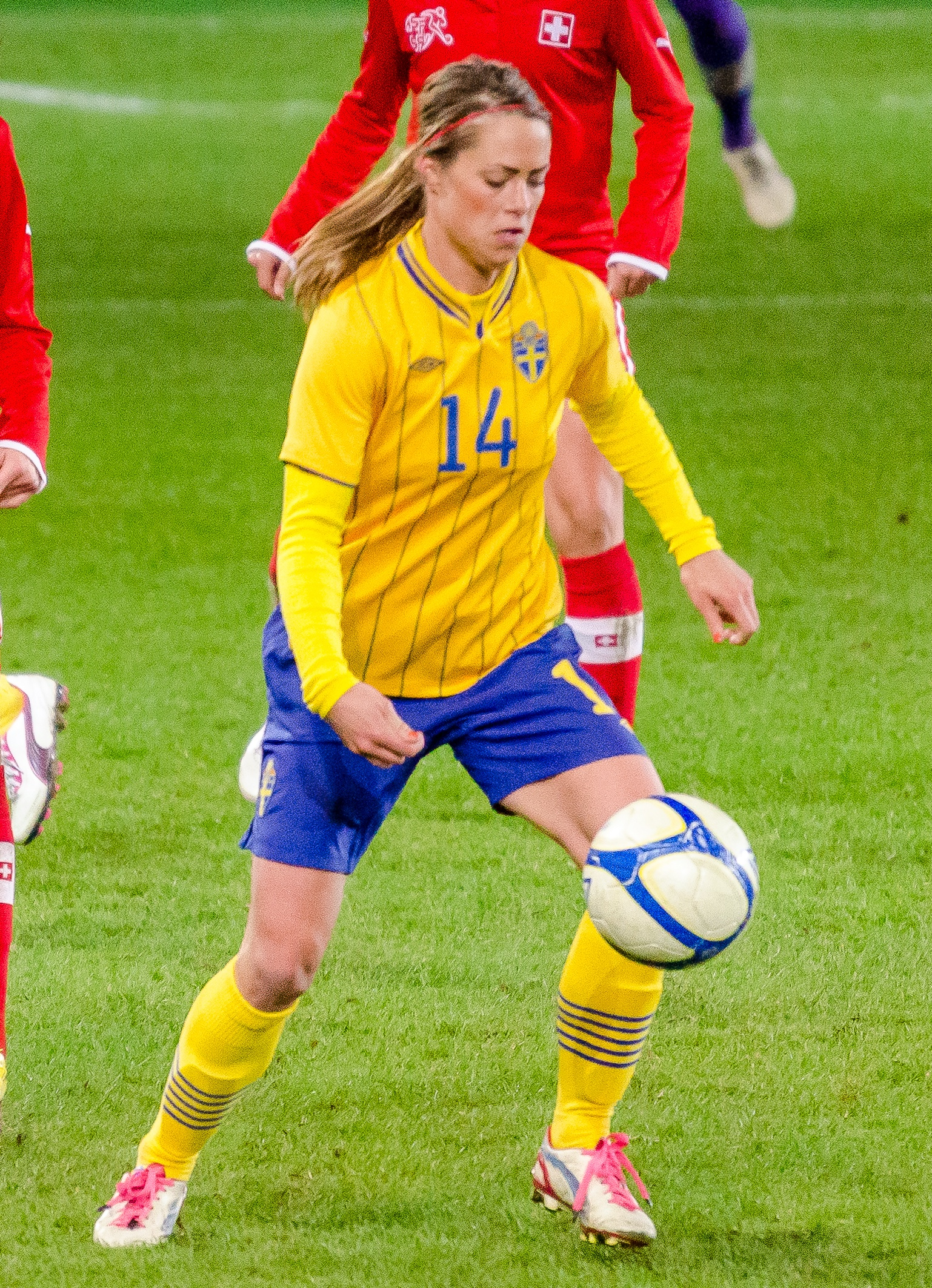

Personal information
- Full name: Johanna Maria-Therese Almgren
- Date of birth: 22 March 1984 (age 42)
- Place of birth: Borås, Sweden
- Height: 1.70 m (5 ft 7 in)
- Position: Winger

Youth career
- 2002: Byttorps IF
- 2003: Bälinge IF

Senior career*
Years	Team	Apps	(Gls)
2004–2014	Göteborg FC	138	(18)

International career^{‡}
2008–2013	Sweden	48	(0)

Managerial career
- 2014–: Kungsbacka DFF
- 2024–2025: Kristianstads DFF
- * Club domestic league appearances and goals as of 22:12, 20 July 2015 (UTC) ‡ National team caps and goals as of 9 June 2013

Johanna Maria-Therese Almgren (born 22 March 1984) is a Swedish former football midfielder who played for Damallsvenskan club Göteborg FC and the Swedish national team.

Almgren's career was marred by injuries. In May 2013 she was devastated to be ruled out of UEFA Women's Euro 2013, requiring surgery on her knee for the fifth time.

In November 2014 Almgren was appointed head coach of Elitettan minnows Kungsbacka DFF, with Stina Segerström as her assistant.

== Personal life ==
During the 2008 Summer Olympics, Brazilian footballer Ronaldinho surprised Almgren by asking her to marry him, just a few hours after seeing her for the first time. She rejected the proposal outright. Almgren thought that her friend was joking with her when she got a phone call from a translator saying Ronaldinho wanted her to go to his room. After realizing it wasn't a joke she and a few friends went up. Then he asked her to marry him.
