= Football at the 2004 Summer Olympics – Women's tournament =

2004 Women's Olympic Football Tournament

Tournament details
- Host country: Greece
- Dates: 11–26 August
- Teams: 10 (from 6 confederations)
- Venues: 5 (in 5 host cities)

Final positions
- Champions: United States (2nd title)
- Runners-up: Brazil
- Third place: Germany
- Fourth place: Sweden

Tournament statistics
- Matches played: 20
- Goals scored: 55 (2.75 per match)
- Attendance: 208,637 (10,432 per match)
- Top scorer(s): (Brazil) Cristiane (Germany) Birgit Prinz (5 goals each)
- Fair play award: Japan; Sweden

Women's Olympic Football tournament was held for the third time at the 2004 Summer Olympics. The tournament featured 10 women's national teams from six continental confederations. The 10 teams were drawn into two groups of three and one group of four and each group played a round-robin tournament. At the end of the group stage, the top teams from each group advanced to the knockout stage, beginning with the quarter-finals and culminating with the gold medal match at Karaiskakis Stadium on 26 August 2004.

== Qualification ==
Several qualification tournaments were held to determine the participating nations.

== Venues ==
The tournament was held in five venues across five cities:

- Karaiskakis Stadium, Piraeus
- Pankritio Stadium, Heraklion
- Pampeloponnisiako Stadium, Patras
- Kaftanzoglio Stadium, Thessaloniki
- Panthessaliko Stadium, Volos

== Seeding ==
The tournament was originally planned to form two groups of five teams in the group stage, then play a knockout stage by four teams (two top teams in each group). Due to logistical and calendar issues, the tournament format had to be changed. FIFA decided to form three groups of three or four teams in the group stage, then play a knockout stage by eight teams (two top teams in each group and two best third-placed teams from three groups).

Pot 1: Europe	Pot 2: Americas	Pot 3: Rest of the World
Greece (Hosts); Germany; Sweden	Brazil; Mexico; United States	Australia; China; Japan; Nigeria

== Match officials ==
Referees
Confederation	Referee
AFC	Bentla D'Coth (India)
CAF	Fatou Gaye (Senegal)
CONCACAF	Dianne Ferreira-James (Guyana)
CONCACAF	Kari Seitz (United States)
CONMEBOL	Silvia Regina de Oliveira (Brazil)
OFC	Krystyna Szokolai (Australia)
UEFA	Dagmar Damková (Czech Republic)
UEFA	Christine Frai (Germany)
UEFA	Cristina Ionescu (Romania)
UEFA	Jenny Palmqvist (Sweden)

Assistant referees
Confederation	Assistant referee
AFC	Shiho Ayukai (Japan)
AFC	Liu Hongjuan (China PR)
CAF	Mariette Bantsimba (Congo)
CAF	Tempa Ndah (Benin)
CONCACAF	Denise Robinson (Canada)
CONCACAF	Jackeline Sáez Blanquice (Panama)
CONCACAF	María Isabel Tovar (Mexico)
CONMEBOL	Aracely Castro (Bolivia)
CONMEBOL	Ana Paula Oliveira (Brazil)
OFC	Airlie Keen (Australia)
OFC	Jacqueline Leleu (Australia)
UEFA	Katarzyna Nadolska (Poland)
UEFA	Emilia Parviainen (Finland)
UEFA	Andi Regan (Great Britain)
UEFA	Nelly Viennot (France)
UEFA	María Luisa Villa Gutiérrez (Spain)

== Group stage ==
Competing countries were divided into three groups: two containing three teams (groups E and F) and one containing four teams (group G). Teams in each group played one another in a round-robin. The top two teams of each group advanced to the knockout stage, along with the third-placed team from the four-team group (group G) and the better-ranked third-placed team from the three-team groups (groups E and F).

Key:

- Teams highlighted in green went through to the knockout stages.

=== Group E ===
Pos	Team	Pld	W	D	L	GF	GA	GD	Pts	Qualification
1	Sweden	2	1	0	1	2	2	0	3	Qualified for the quarterfinals
2	Nigeria	2	1	0	1	2	2	0	3	Qualified for the quarterfinals
3	Japan	2	1	0	1	1	1	0	3	Qualified for the quarterfinals

11 August 2004
18:00

Sweden	0–1	Japan
	Report	Arakawa 24'

Panthessaliko Stadium, Volos
Attendance: 10.104
Referee: Gaye (Senegal)

14 August 2004
18:00

Japan	0–1	Nigeria
	Report	Okolo 55'

Karaiskakis Stadium, Piraeus
Attendance: 14.126
Referee: Ferreira-James (Guyana)

17 August 2004
18:00

Sweden	2–1	Nigeria
Marklund 68'; Moström 73'	Report	Akide 25'

Panthessaliko Stadium, Volos
Attendance: 21.597
Referee: de Oliveira (Brazil)

=== Group F ===
Pos	Team	Pld	W	D	L	GF	GA	GD	Pts	Qualification
1	Germany	2	2	0	0	10	0	+10	6	Qualified for the quarterfinals
2	Mexico	2	0	1	1	1	3	−2	1	Qualified for the quarterfinals
3	China	2	0	1	1	1	9	−8	1	

11 August 2004
18:00

Germany	8–0	China
Prinz 13', 21', 73', 88'; Wunderlich 65'; Lingor 76' (pen.); Pohlers 82'; Müller 90'	Report

Pampeloponnisiako Stadium, Patras
Attendance: 14.657
Referee: Seitz (United States)

14 August 2004
18:00

China	1–1	Mexico
Ji Ting 34'	Report	Domínguez 11'

Pampeloponnisiako Stadium, Patras
Attendance: 5.112
Referee: Ionescu (Romania)

17 August 2004
18:00

Germany	2–0	Mexico
Wimbersky 20'; Prinz 79'	Report

Karaiskakis Stadium, Piraeus
Attendance: 26.338
Referee: Szokolai (Australia)

=== Group G ===
Pos	Team	Pld	W	D	L	GF	GA	GD	Pts	Qualification
1	United States	3	2	1	0	6	1	+5	7	Qualified for the quarterfinals
2	Brazil	3	2	0	1	8	2	+6	6	Qualified for the quarterfinals
3	Australia	3	1	1	1	2	2	0	4	Qualified for the quarterfinals
4	Greece	3	0	0	3	0	11	−11	0	

11 August 2004
18:00

Greece	0–3	United States
	Report	Boxx 14'; Wambach 30'; Hamm 82'

Pankritio Stadium, Heraklio
Attendance: 15.757
Referee: Palmqvist (Sweden)
11 August 2004
18:00

Brazil	1–0	Australia
Marta 36'	Report

Kaftanzoglio Stadium, Thessaloniki
Attendance: 25.152
Referee: Damková (Czech Republic)

14 August 2004
18:00

Greece	0–1	Australia
	Report	Garriock 27'

Pankritio Stadium, Heraklio
Attendance: 8.857
Referee: D'Coth (India)
14 August 2004
18:00

United States	2–0	Brazil
Hamm 58' (pen.); Wambach 77'	Report

Kaftanzoglio Stadium, Thessaloniki
Attendance: 17.123
Referee: Damkova (Czech Republic)

17 August 2004
18:00

Greece	0–7	Brazil
	Report	Pretinha 21'; Cristiane 46', 55', 77'; Grazielle 49'; Marta 70'; Daniela 72'

Pampeloponnisiako Stadium, Patras
Attendance: 7.214
Referee: Frai (Germany)
17 August 2004
18:00

United States	1–1	Australia
Lilly 19'	Report	Peters 82'

Kaftanzoglio Stadium, Thessaloniki
Attendance: 3.320
Referee: Ionescu (Romania)

=== Ranking of third-placed teams from groups of three ===
Team	Pld	W	D	L	GF	GA	GD	Pts
Japan	2	1	0	1	1	1	0	3
China	2	0	1	1	1	9	−8	1

== Knockout stage ==
Quarter-finals
20 August – Patras
Germany	2
Nigeria	1
20 August – Thessaloniki
United States	2
Japan	1
20 August – Heraklio
Mexico	0
Brazil	5
20 August – Volos
Sweden	2
Australia	1

Semi-finals
23 August – Heraklio
Germany	1
United States (a.e.t.)	2
23 August – Patras
Sweden	0
Brazil	1

Final
26 August – Piraeus
United States (a.e.t.)	2
Brazil	1
Bronze medal match
26 August – Piraeus
Germany	1
Sweden	0

=== Quarter-finals ===
20 August 2004
18:00

Germany	2–1	Nigeria
Jones 76'; Pohlers 81'	Report	Akide 49'

Pampeloponnisiako Stadium, Patras
Attendance: 2.531
Referee: D'Coth (India)
20 August 2004
18:00

United States	2–1	Japan
Lilly 43'; Wambach 59'	Report	Yamamoto 48'

Kaftanzoglio Stadium, Thessaloniki
Attendance: 1.418
Referee: de Oliveira (Brazil)
20 August 2004
21:00

Mexico	0–5	Brazil
	Report	Cristiane 25', 49'; Formiga 29', 54'; Marta 60'

Pankritio Stadium, Heraklio
Attendance: 3.012
Referee: Gaye (Senegal)
20 August 2004
21:00

Sweden	2–1	Australia
Ljungberg 25'; Larsson 30'	Report	De Vanna 48'

Panthessaliko Stadium, Volos
Attendance: 4.811
Referee: Damková (Czech Republic)

=== Semi-finals ===
23 August 2004
18:00

United States	2–1 (a.e.t.)	Germany
Lilly 33'; O'Reilly 99'	Report	Bachor 90+2'

Pankritio Stadium, Heraklio
Attendance: 5.165
Referee: Szokolai (Australia)
23 August 2004
21:00

Sweden	0–1	Brazil
	Report	Pretinha 64'

Pampeloponnisiako Stadium, Patras
Attendance: 1.511
Referee: Ferreira-James (Guyana)

=== Bronze medal match ===
26 August 2004
18:00

Germany	1–0	Sweden
Lingor 17'	Report

Karaiskakis Stadium, Piraeus
Attendance: 10,416
Referee: Kari Seitz (United States)

=== Gold medal match ===
26 August 2004
21:00

United States	2–1 (a.e.t.)	Brazil
Tarpley 39'; Wambach 112'	Report	Pretinha 73'

Karaiskakis Stadium, Piraeus
Attendance: 10,416
Referee: Jenny Palmqvist (Sweden) (Note: Palmqvist was replaced by Dianne Ferreira-James (Guyana) after 90 minutes due to dehydration.)

United States	Brazil

GK	1	Briana Scurry
CB	3	Christie Rampone
CB	5	Lindsay Tarpley		(substituted off) 91'
CB	6	Brandi Chastain		(substituted off) 61'
RWB	7	Shannon Boxx
DM	13	Kristine Lilly
CM	9	Mia Hamm
CM	11	Julie Foudy
LWB	14	Joy Fawcett
FW	15	Kate Markgraf
FW	16	Abby Wambach
Substitutes:
CB	4	Cat Whitehill	(substituted on) 61'
CB	14	Heather O'Reilly	(substituted on) 91'
Manager:
USA April Heinrichs

GK	1	Andréia
CB	3	Mônica	(yellow card) 47'
CB	4	Tânia Maranhão
CB	5	Juliana Cabral
RWB	16	Daniela Alves
DM	7	Formiga	(yellow card) 18'
CM	9	Pretinha
CM	10	Marta
LB	11	Rosana		(substituted off) 111'
LWB	12	Cristiane
FW	14	Elaine		(substituted off) 88'
Substitutes:
RW	6	Renata Costa	(substituted on) 88'
RB	15	Maycon	(substituted on) 111'
Manager:
(Brazil) Renê Simões

== Statistics ==
=== Goalscorers ===
There were 55 goals scored in 20 matches, for an average of 2.75 goals per match. Cristiane of Brazil and Birgit Prinz of Germany finished as the top scorers of the tournament, with each scoring five goals.

5 goals

- (Brazil) Cristiane
- (Germany) Birgit Prinz

4 goals

- (United States) Abby Wambach

3 goals

- (Brazil) Marta
- (Brazil) Pretinha
- (United States) Kristine Lilly

2 goals

- (Brazil) Formiga
- (Germany) Renate Lingor
- (Germany) Conny Pohlers
- (Nigeria) Mercy Akide
- (United States) Mia Hamm

1 goal

- (Australia) Lisa De Vanna
- (Australia) Heather Garriock
- (Australia) Joanne Peters
- (Brazil) Daniela
- (Brazil) Grazielle
- (China) Ji Ting
- (Germany) Isabell Bachor
- (Germany) Steffi Jones
- (Germany) Martina Müller
- (Germany) Petra Wimbersky
- (Germany) Pia Wunderlich
- (Japan) Eriko Arakawa
- (Japan) Emi Yamamoto
- (Mexico) Maribel Domínguez
- (Nigeria) Vera Okolo
- (Sweden) Sara Larsson
- (Sweden) Hanna Ljungberg
- (Sweden) Hanna Marklund
- (Sweden) Malin Moström
- (United States) Shannon Boxx
- (United States) Heather O'Reilly
- (United States) Lindsay Tarpley

Source: FIFA

=== Assists ===
3 assists

- (Germany) Renate Lingor
- (Germany) Kerstin Stegemann
- (Nigeria) Perpetua Nkwocha

2 assists

- (Brazil) Formiga
- (Brazil) Grazielle
- (Brazil) Marta
- (Brazil) Pretinha
- (Brazil) Rosana
- (Germany) Martina Müller
- (Germany) Conny Pohlers
- (Sweden) Victoria Svensson
- (United States) Mia Hamm

1 assist

- (Australia) Heather Garriock
- (Australia) Sarah Walsh
- (Brazil) Cristiane
- (Brazil) Daniela
- (Brazil) Maycon
- (China) Qu Feifei
- (Germany) Sonja Fuss
- (Germany) Birgit Prinz
- (Germany) Pia Wunderlich
- (Japan) Mio Otani
- (Sweden) Kristin Bengtsson
- (Sweden) Malin Moström
- (United States) Shannon Boxx
- (United States) Julie Foudy
- (United States) Kristine Lilly
- (United States) Kate Markgraf
- (United States) Abby Wambach

Source: FIFA

=== FIFA Fair Play Award ===
Japan and Sweden won the FIFA Fair Play Award, given to the team with the best record of fair play during the tournament. Every match in the final competition is taken into account but only teams that played at least three matches are eligible for the Fair Play Award.

Pos	Team	Pts
1	Japan	857
1	Sweden	857
3	Australia	843
4	China	815
5	Germany	811
6	Nigeria	781
7	Brazil	772
8	United States	762
9	Greece	752
10	Mexico	686

=== Tournament ranking ===
Per statistical convention in football, matches decided in extra time are counted as wins and losses, while matches decided by penalty shoot-outs are counted as draws.

Pos	Grp	Team	Pld	W	D	L	GF	GA	GD	Pts	Final result
1	G	United States	6	5	1	0	12	4	+8	16	Gold medal
2	G	Brazil	6	4	0	2	15	4	+11	12	Silver medal
3	F	Germany	5	4	0	1	14	3	+11	12	Bronze medal
4	E	Sweden	5	2	0	3	4	5	−1	6	Fourth place
5	G	Australia	4	1	1	2	3	4	−1	4	Eliminated in quarter-finals
6	E	Nigeria	3	1	0	2	3	4	−1	3	Eliminated in quarter-finals
7	E	Japan	3	1	0	2	2	3	−1	3	Eliminated in quarter-finals
8	F	Mexico	3	0	1	2	1	8	−7	1	Eliminated in quarter-finals
9	F	China	2	0	1	1	1	9	−8	1	Eliminated in group stage
10	G	Greece (H)	3	0	0	3	0	11	−11	0	Eliminated in group stage

Source: FIFA
(H) Hosts
