= Lotta Runesson =

Swedish footballer

Personal information
- Full name: Lotta Runesson
- Date of birth: 16 November 1981 (age 44)
- Place of birth: Sweden
- Height: 1.72 m (5 ft 8 in)
- Position: Midfielder

Senior career*
Years	Team	Apps	(Gls)
- Öster
2001–2003	Umeå		
2004–2006	Linköping		
2007–	Karlskrona		
- * Club domestic league appearances and goals

Lotta Runesson is a Swedish football midfielder, currently playing for Karlskronas FF in the Division 3. She previously played for Östers IF, Umeå IK and Linköping FC in the Damallsvenskan.

She was an Under-21 international.
