= Maria Bergkvist =

Swedish football coach and former player

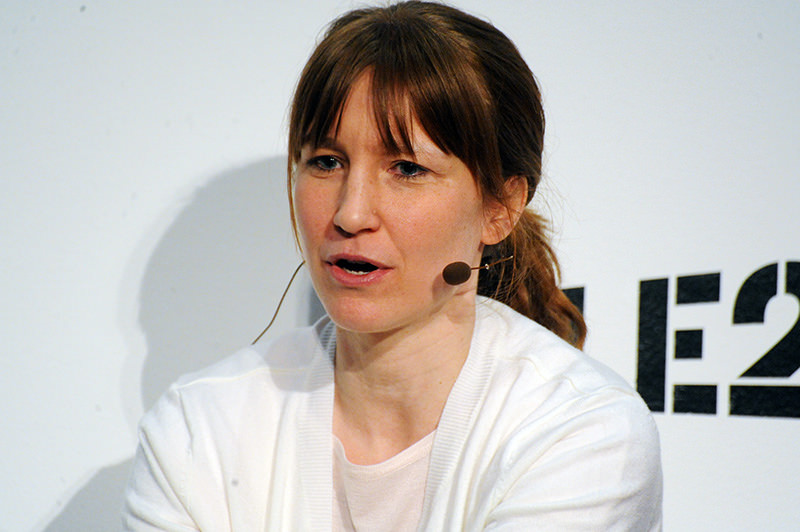
- Maria Bergkvist in April 2015

Personal information
- Full name: Maria Bergkvist
- Date of birth: 12 August 1977 (age 49)
- Place of birth: Sweden
- Position: Defender

Team information
- Current team: Umeå IK

Youth career
- Remsle UIF

Senior career*
Years	Team	Apps	(Gls)
1995–1998	Bollsta IK		
1999–2007	Umeå IK		

International career^{‡}
2006	Sweden	7	(0)

Managerial career
- 2009–2014: Umeå IK (assistant)
- 2015–2016: Umeå IK
- * Club domestic league appearances and goals as of 21:48, 9 November 2015 (UTC) ‡ National team caps and goals as of 21:48, 9 November 2015 (UTC)

Maria Bergkvist (born 12 August 1977) is a Swedish football coach and former player who was the manager of Damallsvenskan club Umeå IK. In her playing career she was a defender for Umeå and the Sweden national team.

== Club career ==
While playing for Umeå between 1999 and 2007 Bergkvist won six Damallsvenskan titles and two UEFA Women's Cups (now known as UEFA Women's Champions League). She returned to the club as an assistant coach in 2009. After five years as an assistant, Bergkvist took the head coach job for Umeå's 2015 campaign.

== International career ==
Bergkvist won her first cap for Sweden aged 28, starting a 1–1 draw with England in Cyprus on 9 February 2006. She made a total of seven national team appearances, all in 2006.
