= Maria Nordbrandt =

Swedish footballer

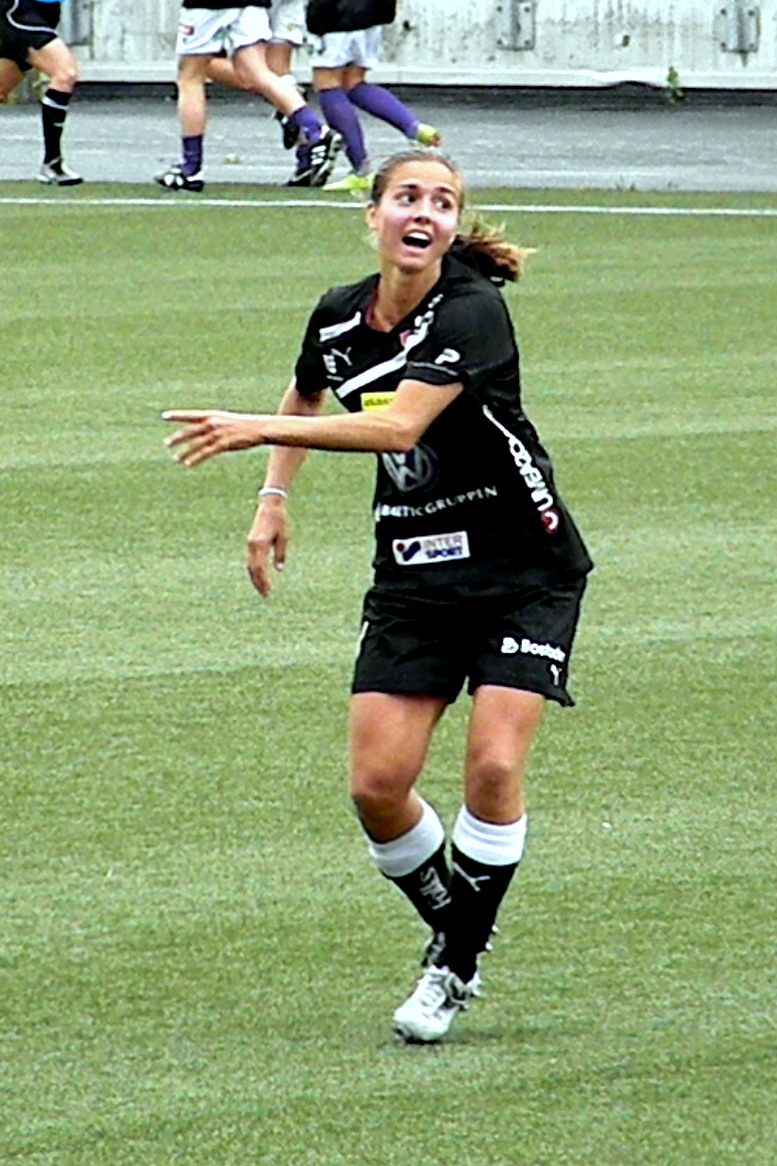

Personal information
- Date of birth: 6 April 1985 (age 41)
- Place of birth: Gimonäs, Sweden
- Height: 1.71 m (5 ft 7 1/2 in)
- Positions: Winger; forward

Youth career
- Gimonäs CK

Senior career*
| Years | Team | Apps | (Gls) |
| 2001–2005 | Umeå IK | | |
| 2006–2007 | Sunnanå SK | | |
| 2008–2010 | KIF Örebro DFF | 52 | (14) |
| 2011–2012 | Umeå IK | 41 | (7) |

International career
| 2008 | Sweden | 2 | (0) |
- * Club domestic league appearances and goals

Maria Nordbrandt (born 6 April 1985) is a Swedish former football striker, who played for Umeå IK in the Damallsvenskan between 2001 and 2005, then again from 2011 to 2012. She has also played for Sunnanå SK and KIF Örebro. In her first spell at Umeå she won two UEFA Women's Cups. She won two caps with the senior Sweden women's national football team.

As an Under-19 international Nordbrandt played in the 2003 U-19 European Championship. She was named in Thomas Dennerby's initial 30-player list for the 2007 FIFA Women's World Cup, but did not make the final selection. On 12 February 2008 she made her senior debut in a 2–0 win over England.

After retiring at the age of 27 in 2012 Nordbrandt joined the coaching staff at Umeå IK.

== Titles ==
- 2 European Cups (2003, 2004)
- 3 Swedish Leagues (2001, 2002, 2005)
- 4 Swedish Cups (2001, 2002, 2003, 2010)
