= Sofia Eriksson =

Swedish international footballer

Personal information
- Full name: Ingrid Kristina Sofia Eriksson
- Date of birth: 11 May 1979 (age 47)
- Place of birth: Umeå, Sweden
- Height: 1.68 m (5 ft 6 in)
- Position: Left back

Senior career*
| Years | Team | Apps | (Gls) |
- Betsele IF
- Umeå IK

International career
| 2001-2004 | Sweden | 14 | (1) |
- * Club domestic league appearances and goals

Ingrid Kristina Sofia Eriksson (born 11 May 1979) is a Swedish former football player, who played the position of left back. She played for the club side Umeå IK and for the Swedish national football team.

== National team ==
Sofia Eriksson represented Sweden 14 times and scored one goal. At UEFA Women's Euro 2001, Eriksson scored a goal directly from a corner in a 4–0 win over England. Sweden would end up runners up losing to Germany by a golden goal.

== Honours ==
=== Club ===
Umeå IK

- Damallsvenskan:

Champion (3): 2000, 2001, 2002

- Svenska Cupen Damer:

Champion (4): 2001, 2002, 2003

- UEFA Women's Cup:

Champion (1): 2003
Runner-up (1): 2002

=== International ===
Sweden

- UEFA Women's Championship:

Runner-up (1): 2001
