= Kristin Bengtsson =

Swedish footballer (born 1970)

Personal information
- Full name: Gärd Kristin Bengtsson
- Date of birth: 12 January 1970 (age 56)
- Place of birth: Stockholm, Sweden
- Height: 1.69 m (5 ft 7 in)
- Position: Defender

Youth career
- Viksjö IK

Senior career*
Years	Team	Apps	(Gls)
1977–1987	IFK Viksjö		
1988–1996	Hammarby IF	176	(32)
1997	Öxabäck IF		
1998	Suzuyo Shimizu Lovely Ladies		
1999	Athene Moss		
1999–2001	Kopparbergs/Landvetter IF		
2001	San Diego Spirit		
2001	Carolina Courage		
2002	Malmö FF		
2003	Kopparbergs/Landvetter IF		
2004–2007	Djurgårdens IF (Note: 2004–2006 as Djurgården/Älvsjö.)		
2008–2010	Hammarby IF	46	(5)

International career
1991–2005	Sweden	157	(14)

Managerial career
- 2013: Hammarby IF
- * Club domestic league appearances and goals

Gärd Kristin "Kicki" Bengtsson (born 12 January 1970) is a Swedish former footballer who played as a defender. She represented the Sweden national team from 1991 to 2005.

== International career ==
She holds 157 caps for the Swedish women's national team. Bengtsson has appeared in three World Cups, 1995, 1999, and 2003 competitions. She netted one goal in the 1999 competition, scoring the opening goal on her team's first day of match play against China. She competed at three Olympic Games with Sweden: Atlanta 1996, Sydney 2000, and Athens 2004. Bengtsson also appeared in four UEFA Championships with Sweden, 1995, 1997, 2001, and 2005 competitions.

== Career statistics ==
=== International ===
Scores and results list Sweden's goal tally first, score column indicates score after each Bengtsson goal.

List of international goals scored by Kristin Bengtsson
No.	Date	Venue	Opponent	Score	Result	Competition	Ref.
	June 19, 1999	San Jose, California	China	1–0	1–2	1999 FIFA Women's World Cup	
	June 27, 2001	Jena	England	2–0	4–0	UEFA Women's Euro 2001	

== Honours ==
Djurgårdens IF

- Damallsvenskan: winner 2004
- Svenska Cupen: Winner 2004, 2005

Hammarby IF

- Svenska Cupen: Winner 1994, 1995

Sweden

- FIFA Women's World Cup runner-up: 2003
- Summer Olympics fourth place: 2004
- UEFA Women's Championship runner-up: 1995, 2001; fourth place: 1997, 2005
- Algarve Cup: 1995, 2001
- Four Nations Tournament third place: 2004; fourth place: 1998
- Australia Cup: 2003

Individual

- Diamantbollen: (2): 1994, 2004
- Swedish Defender of the Year (1): 2004
