= Pia Wunderlich =

German footballer (born 1975)

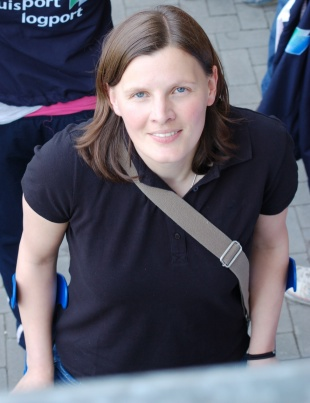

Personal information
- Full name: Pia Wunderlich
- Date of birth: 26 January 1975 (age 51)
- Place of birth: Schwarzenau, West Germany
- Height: 1.73 m (5 ft 8 in)
- Position: Midfielder

Team information
- Current team: 1. FFC Frankfurt
- Number: 7

Youth career
- 1982–1989: TuS Schwarzenau
- 1989–1991: TSV Battenberg

Senior career*
Years	Team	Apps	(Gls)
1991–1993	TSV Battenberg		
1993–2009	1. FFC Frankfurt		

International career^{‡}
1993–2006	Germany	102	(21)
Medal record
Women's Football
Bronze medal – third place	2004 Athens	Team competition
- * Club domestic league appearances and goals ‡ National team caps and goals as of 15 April 2007

Pia Wunderlich (born 26 January 1975 in Schwarzenau) is a German former footballer who played as a midfielder. She played solely for 1. FFC Frankfurt at professional club level and was selected for the German national team 102 times, winning major honours with both. She was recognised by Spanish club Athletic Bilbao with the One Club Woman Award for her services to Frankfurt.

Her younger sister Tina played alongside her at Frankfurt, and with Germany.

== Honours ==
1. FFC Frankfurt

- UEFA Cup: Winner 2001–02, 2005–06 and 2007–08
- Fußball-Bundesliga: 1999, 2001, 2002, 2003, 2005 and 2007
- DFB-Pokal: 1999, 2000, 2001, 2002, 2003, 2007 and 2008
- DFB-Hallenpokal: 1997, 1999 and 2002

SG Praunheim

- DFB-Hallenpokal: 1998

Germany

- World Cup: winner 2003, runner-up 1995
- European Champion: winner 1997, 2001 and 2005

Individual

- One Club Woman Award: 2020
