= Anna Sjöström =

Swedish footballer (born 1977)

Personal information
- Full name: Anna Maria Kristina Sjöström Amcoff
- Birth name: Anna Maria Kristina Sjöström
- Date of birth: 23 April 1977 (age 49)
- Place of birth: Skellefteå, Sweden
- Height: 1.66 m (5 ft 5 in)
- Position: Striker

Senior career*
Years	Team	Apps	(Gls)
1997–2006	Umeå		

International career
2001–2006	Sweden	67	(7)
- * Club domestic league appearances and goals

Anna Maria Kristina Sjöström Amcoff (née Sjöström; born 23 April 1977) is a Swedish former football striker. She played for Umeå IK in the Damallsvenskan, winning two European Cups and five national championships before retiring in 2006.

She was a member of the Sweden women's national football team, taking part in the 2003 World Cup where Sweden won the silver medal, the 2004 Summer Olympics and the 2005 European Championship where she scored a winner against host England to qualify Sweden for the semifinals.

== Personal life ==
Sjöström was born in Skellefteå, and now uses the surname Sjöström Amcoff.

== Honours ==
- 2 UEFA Women's Cups (2003, 2004)
- 5 Swedish Leagues (2000, 2001, 2002, 2005, 2006)
- 3 Swedish Cups (2001, 2002, 2003)
