= Frida Östberg =

Swedish footballer

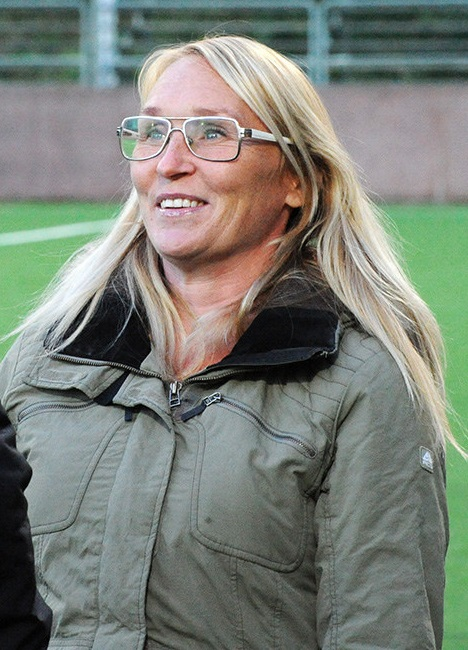
- Frida Östberg in October 2015

Personal information
- Full name: Frida Christina Östberg
- Date of birth: 10 December 1977 (age 48)
- Place of birth: Örnsköldsvik, Sweden
- Height: 5 ft 4 in (1.63 m)
- Position: Midfielder

Youth career
- –1994: Hägglunds IoFK

Senior career*
| Years | Team | Apps | (Gls) |
| 1995–2005 | Umeå IK | | |
| 2006–2007 | Linköpings FC | | |
| 2008 | Umeå IK | 22 | (4) |
| 2009 | Chicago Red Stars | 17 | (0) |
| 2010 | Umeå IK | 13 | (0) |

International career
| 2001–2009 | Sweden | 78 | (2) |
- * Club domestic league appearances and goals

Frida Christina Östberg (born 10 December 1977) is a Swedish retired football midfielder who played for Umeå IK, Linköpings FC and Chicago Red Stars of Women's Professional Soccer. She is a former member of the Sweden women's national football team.

== Club career ==
Östberg started her career with Hägglunds IoFK, who she played for until 1994. For the 1995 season, she moved to Umeå IK where she stayed until 2005. For 2006 and 2007, Östberg played for Linköpings FC. She left Linköpings in November 2007.

Östberg made claims of moving back and playing for her former club Umeå IK On 30 November 2007, Östberg announced her return to Umeå IK after two seasons with Linköpings. She played for Umeå for the 2008 season before once again leaving the team. She won the Diamantbollen in 2008, which is awarded to the best Swedish women's soccer player.

With the creation of a new top-flight women's league in the United States, Women's Professional Soccer, Östberg was headed overseas. She was named as a post-draft discovery player by Chicago Red Stars and played the 2009 Women's Professional Soccer season with the club. She played in 17 games (16 starts, 1416 total minutes), but did not record any goals or assists. Following the conclusion of the season, she was waived by the club making her a free agent.

Östberg returned to Umeå IK but retired during the 2010 season after announcing her pregnancy.

== International career ==
Östberg made her debut for Sweden in 2001 against Norway. She has appeared in the 2003 and 2007 editions of the FIFA Women's World Cup for Sweden, as well as the 2004 and 2008 Olympic Games.

In total, she appeared 78 times for the senior national team, scoring twice.
