= Hanna Marklund =

Swedish footballer (born 1977)

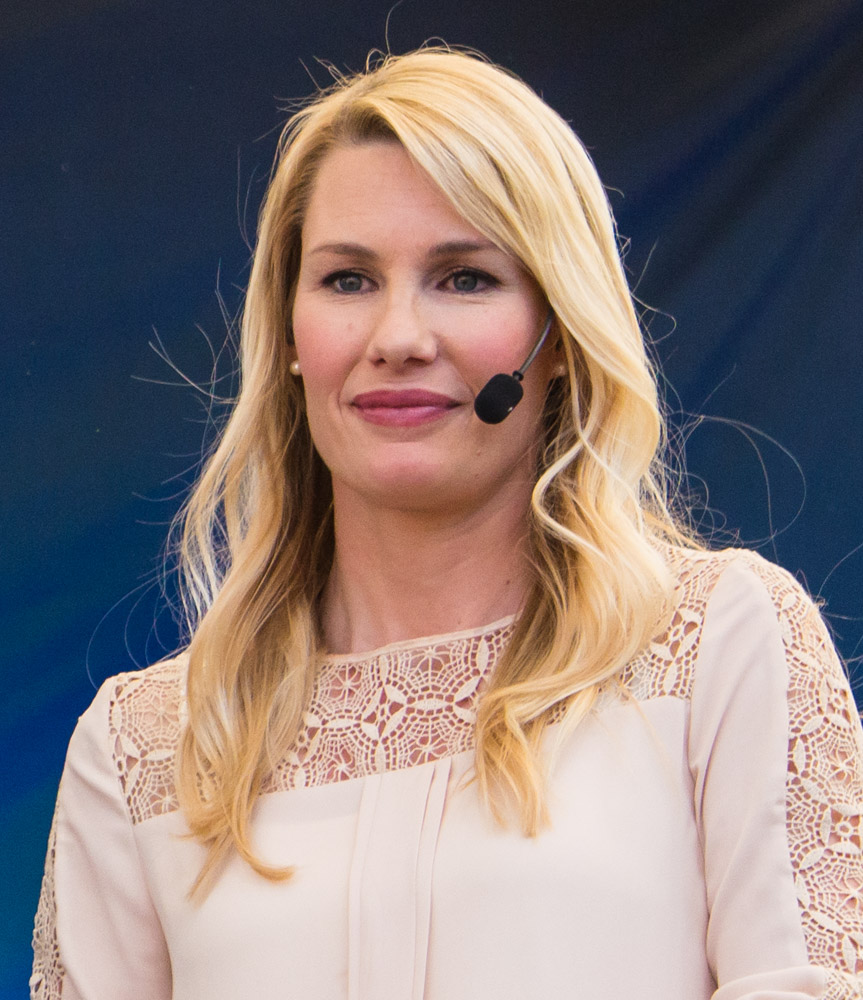
- Hanna Marklund in Kungsträdgården in Stockholm, Sweden in July 2015

Personal information
- Full name: Hanna Gunilla Marklund
- Date of birth: 26 November 1977 (age 48)
- Place of birth: Skellefteå, Sweden
- Height: 1.71 m (5 ft 7 1/2 in)
- Position: Centre back

Senior career*
Years	Team	Apps	(Gls)
1990–1999	Sunnanå SK		
2000–2004	Umeå IK		
2005–2008	Sunnanå SK	39	(3)

International career^{‡}
1997–2008	Sweden	118	(6)
- * Club domestic league appearances and goals as of 14:00 13 October 2007 (UTC) ‡ National team caps and goals as of 2007-09-30

Hanna Gunilla Marklund (born 26 November 1977, in Skellefteå) is a Swedish former football player who played as a defender.

== Career ==
Marklund started playing in Varuträsk IF near Skellefteå, where she grew up. She moved on to play in Damallsvenskan with Sunnanå SK. In 2000, she joined Umeå IK, with whom she won Damallsvenskan three years in a row (2000–2002). After the 2004 season she decided to move back to Skellefteå and rejoin Sunnanå SK, where her two sisters Carolina and Mirjam also played. She went on to captain Sunnanå SK.

She made her first appearance in the Swedish national team on 8 August 1997, against Iceland. She became a regular member of the team, winning a total of 118 caps and scoring six international goals.

In November 2005 she won Diamantbollen, an award given the best female player in Sweden each year.

On 7 January 2008, Marklund announced her retirement from both the national team and Sunnanå SK as a result of her pregnancy.

Hanna Marklund appeared for Sweden in two World Cups (USA 2003, China 2007) and two Olympic Games (Sydney 2000, Athens 2004.) Marklund was on the roster for the 1999 World Cup as well, but did not see any playing time.

Hanna Marklund participated in two European Championship tournaments: Germany 2001, and England 2005.

== International goals ==
No.	Date	Venue	Opponent	Score	Result	Competition
1.	3 March 2002	Ferreiras, Portugal	Norway	2–1	3–3	2002 Algarve Cup
2.	12 October 2002	Växjö, Sweden	Poland	4–0	8–0	Friendly
3.	12 October 2002	Växjö, Sweden	Poland	7–0	8–0	Friendly
4.	15 November 2003	Železnik, Serbia and Montenegro	Serbia	4–0	4–0	UEFA Women's Euro 2005 qualifying
5.	17 August 2004	Volos, Greece	Nigeria	1–1	2–1	2004 Summer Olympics
6.	20 June 2007	Karlstad, Sweden	Hungary	2–0	7–0	UEFA Women's Euro 2009 qualifying

== Honours ==
Umeå IK

- Damallsvenskan: 2000, 2001, 2002; Runner-up: 2003, 2004
- Svenska Cupen: 2001, 2002, 2003; Runner-up: 2004
- UEFA Women's Champions League: 2002–03, 2003–04

Sunnanå SK

- Svenska Cupen Runner-up: 1997

Sweden

- FIFA Women's World Cup runner-up: 2003
- Summer Olympics fourth place: 2004
- UEFA Women's Championship runner-up: 2001; semi-finalist: 2005

Individual

- Fotbollsgalan 2005
  - Diamantbollen: Best female player in Sweden 2005
  - Best female defence in Sweden 2005
- Fotbollsgalan 2006
  - Best female defence in Sweden 2006
- Fotbollsgalan 2007
  - Best female defence in Sweden 2007
