= Malin Moström =

Swedish footballer (born 1975)

Personal information
- Full name: Malin Sofi Moström
- Date of birth: 1 August 1975 (age 51)
- Place of birth: Örnsköldsvik, Sweden
- Height: 1.66 m (5 ft 5 1/2 in)
- Position: Midfielder

Youth career
- Hägglunds IoFK

Senior career*
Years	Team	Apps	(Gls)
1995–2007	Umeå IK		

International career^{‡}
1998–2006	Sweden	113	(21)
- * Club domestic league appearances and goals ‡ National team caps and goals as of 16:00, 24 September 2006 (UTC)

Malin Sofi Moström (born 1 August 1975) is a Swedish former football midfielder, from 2001 to 2006 she was the captain of the Sweden women's national football team. Nicknamed "Mosan", she retired in December 2006 in order to focus on her family and new career as a property agent.

== Club career ==
Starting her career in Hägglunds IoFK in her native Örnsköldsvik, she joined Umeå IK in 1995, playing in Damallsvenskan, the highest division of women's football in Sweden. In 2000 she won her first Swedish Championship with the club, and in the following year received the Diamantbollen, the Swedish Football Association's annual prize to the woman player of the year. She also won the Midfielder of the Year in 2003–2005. In 2002 she became the captain of Umeå IK, and in 2003 and 2004, she won the UEFA Women's Cup with the team.

When Moström retired after the 2006 season, Umeå IK retired the number six shirt in her honour. The following season she made a brief comeback, to cover for injuries to Johanna Frisk and Hanna Ljungberg.

In April 2019, she was recognised with the inaugural 'One Club Woman' award by Spanish club Athletic Bilbao for her achievements and loyalty to Umeå.

== International career ==
On 26 July 1998 Moström made her senior debut for Sweden in a friendly against England at Victoria Road, Dagenham. Entering the game as a substitute, she spoiled Hope Powell's first match as England manager by scoring the only goal on 84 minutes.

As a national team player, she has played more than 110 national fixtures, and was one of the most important players when the national team won the silver medal at the FIFA Women's World Cup 2003. Moström's 79th-minute goal against Canada in the Semi-Final of that tournament tied the match and kept Swedish hopes alive. In the 2004 Olympic football tournament she scored a match-winning goal against Nigeria in the final round of the group stage, which took Sweden to the quarter final.

Malin Moström appeared at two European Championship tournaments: Germany 2001, and England 2005.

== Personal life ==
In April 2008 Moström and her husband, former professional ice hockey player Jesper Jäger, moved to Switzerland with their infant daughter Svea. Jäger had secured a coaching role with HC Lugano.

== Career statistics ==
=== International ===
Scores and results list Sweden's goal tally first, score column indicates score after each Moström goal.

List of international goals scored by Malin Moström
No.	Date	Venue	Opponent	Score	Result	Competition	Ref.
	June 30, 1999	San Jose, California	Norway	1–3	1–3	1999 FIFA Women's World Cup	
	September 28, 2003	Columbus, Ohio	Nigeria	3–0	3–0	2003 FIFA Women's World Cup	
	October 5, 2003	Portland, Oregon	Canada	1–1	2–1	2003 FIFA Women's World Cup	
	August 17, 2004	Volos, Greece	Nigeria	2–1	2–1	2004 Summer Olympics	

== Honours ==
Umeå IK

- Damallsvenskan: 2000, 2001, 2002, 2005, 2006, 2007
- Svenska Cupen: 2001, 2002, 2003, 2007
- Svenska Supercupen: 2007
- UEFA Women's Champions League: 2003, 2004; runner-up: 2002

Sweden

- FIFA Women's World Cup runner-up: 2003
- Summer Olympics fourth place: 2004
- UEFA Women's Championship runner-up: 2001; fourth place: 2005
- Algarve Cup: 2001
- Australia Cup: 2003

Individual

- Best Swedish Midfielder: 2003, 2004, 2005
- Diamantbollen: 2001
- FIFA Women's World Cup All-Star Team: 2003
- One Club Woman Award: 2019
