= 2003–04 UEFA Women's Cup qualifying round =

Tournament details
- Dates: 1 July–23 August 2003
- Teams: 41

The 2003–04 UEFA Women's Champions League qualifying round was played on 1–20 July 2003 and 19, 21 and 23 August 2003. A total of 41 teams competed in the qualifying round to decide the 8 places in the knockout phase of the 2003–04 UEFA Women's Cup.

== First qualifying round ==
=== Group A1 ===
Matches were played in Novo Mesto, Slovenia.

Pos	Team	Pld	W	D	L	GF	GA	GD	Pts	Qualification	MHO	KRK	VTA	LA
1	(Israel) Maccabi Holon	2	2	0	0	7	3	+4	6	Advance to second qualifying round	—	4–2	–	w/o
2	(Slovenia) Krka Novo Mesto (H)	2	1	0	1	3	4	−1	3		–	—	1–0	w/o
3	(Estonia) Visa Tallinn	2	0	0	2	1	4	−3	0		1–3	–	—	w/o
4	(Belgium) Lebeke-Aalst (W)	0	0	0	0	0	0	0	0		–	–	–	—

Source: RSSSF
(H) Hosts; (W) Withdrew
1 July 2003

Maccabi Holon (Israel)	4–2	(Slovenia) Krka Novo Mesto
Jan 6', 11'; Shenar 29'; Bogolin 90' (o.g.)	Report	Vais 15', 35'

Matija Gubec Stadium. Krško
1 July 2003

Visa Tallinn (Estonia)	w/o	(Belgium) Lebeke-Aalst

3 July 2003

Visa Tallinn (Estonia)	1–3	(Israel) Maccabi Holon
Sasova 74'	Report	Jan 2'; Fahima 4'; Shenar 67'

Matija Gubec Stadium. Krško
3 July 2003

Krka Novo Mesto (Slovenia)	w/o	(Belgium) Lebeke-Aalst

5 July 2003

Krka Novo Mesto (Slovenia)	1–0	(Estonia) Visa Tallinn
Ibričić 90'	Report

Matija Gubec Stadium. Krško
5 July 2003

Maccabi Holon (Israel)	w/o	(Belgium) Lebeke-Aalst

=== Group A2 ===
Matches were played in Skopje, North Macedonia.

Pos	Team	Pld	W	D	L	GF	GA	GD	Pts	Qualification	NEU	ŽNH	LSK	PLE
1	(Austria) Neulengbach	3	3	0	0	27	3	+24	9	Advance to second qualifying round	—	6–3	–	14–0
2	(Slovakia) Žiar nad Hronom	3	2	0	1	30	7	+23	6		–	—	–	15–0
3	(North Macedonia) Lombardini Skopje (H)	3	1	0	2	6	19	−13	3		0–7	1–12	—	5–0
4	(Cyprus) PAOK Ledra	3	0	0	3	0	34	−34	0		–	–	–	—

Source: RSSSF
(H) Hosts
15 July 2003

Lombardini Skopje (North Macedonia)	1–12	(Slovakia) Žiar nad Hronom
Spirovska 90'	Report	Dugovičová 6', 8', 35', 75'; Lukácsová 17', 30', 33', 67'; Dodoková 23'; Hanzelová 37', 53', 74'

Gradska Plaža Stadium, Struga
15 July 2003

Neulengbach (Austria)	14–0	(Cyprus) PAOK Ledra
Hufnagl 6', 8', 25', 69', 88'; Gstöttner 12', 47', 82'; Fischer 16', 38'; Jedličková 35'; Pötzl 49'; Brand 64', 90'	Report

SRC Biljanini Izvori, Ohrid

17 July 2003

Lombardini Skopje (North Macedonia)	5–0	(Cyprus) PAOK Ledra
Spirovska 43', 66', 72', 76', 78'	Report

Gradska Plaža Stadium, Struga
17 July 2003

Neulengbach (Austria)	6–3	(Slovakia) Žiar nad Hronom
Gstöttner 16', 33', 54', 75'; Celouch 35'; Jedličková 90'	Report	Dugovičová 26'; Celouch 56'; Izová 65'

SRC Biljanini Izvori, Ohrid

19 July 2003

Lombardini Skopje (North Macedonia)	0–7	(Austria) Neulengbach
	Report	Gstöttner 12', 50', 67'; Fischer 13', 53'; Kaspar 48'; Brand 71'

Gradska Plaža Stadium, Struga
19 July 2003

Žiar nad Hronom (Slovakia)	15–0	(Cyprus) PAOK Ledra
Lukácsová 17', 23', 25', 32'; Hanzelová 19', 63', 73'; Kolenová 20', 85'; Dodoková 41', 49'; Dugovičová 54', 76'; Izová 78'; Knoppová 79'	Report

SRC Biljanini Izvori, Ohrid

=== Group A3 ===
Matches were played in Osijek, Croatia.

Pos	Team	Pld	W	D	L	GF	GA	GD	Pts	Qualification	OSI	TZH	SAR	CAR
1	(Croatia) Osijek (H)	3	2	0	1	7	5	+2	6	Advance to second qualifying round	—	2–1	3–0	2–4
2	(Kazakhstan) Temir Zholy	3	2	0	1	5	4	+1	6		–	—	–	–
3	(Bosnia and Herzegovina) SFK Sarajevo	3	1	0	2	4	7	−3	3		–	2–3	—	–
4	(Wales) Cardiff City	3	1	0	2	5	5	0	3		–	0–1	1–2	—

Source: RSSSF
(H) Hosts
16 July 2003

Osijek (Croatia)	3–0	(Bosnia and Herzegovina) SFK Sarajevo
Kozić 24'; Milas 42'; Koljenik 54'	Report

Zeleno Polje, Osijek
16 July 2003

Cardiff City (Wales)	0–1	(Kazakhstan) Temir Zholy
	Report	Yalova 25'

Sportski Centar "Bikara", Osijek

18 July 2003

Osijek (Croatia)	2–1	(Kazakhstan) Temir Zholy
Omerovic 8'; Kozić 36'	Report	Krasyukova 90'

Sportski Centar "Bikara", Osijek
18 July 2003

Cardiff City (Wales)	1–2	(Bosnia and Herzegovina) SFK Sarajevo
Cooper 2'	Report	Pehić 9'; Fetahović 45'

Gradski Vrt Stadium, Osijek

20 July 2003

Osijek (Croatia)	2–4	(Wales) Cardiff City
Koljenik 35', 52'	Report	Fishlock 2', 16'; Jones 39', 45'

Gradski Vrt Stadium, Osijek
20 July 2003

SFK Sarajevo (Bosnia and Herzegovina)	2–3	(Kazakhstan) Temir Zholy
Hurem 47', 54'	Report	Krasyukova 20'; Yalova 67'; Rybalkina 73'

Zeleno Polje, Osijek

== Second qualifying round ==
=== Group B1 ===
Matches were played in København, Denmark.

Pos	Team	Pld	W	D	L	GF	GA	GD	Pts	Qualification	BRØ	MCN	KR	KIL
1	(Denmark) Brøndby (H)	3	3	0	0	7	0	+7	9	Advance to quarter-finals	—	4–0	1–0	2–0
2	(Serbia and Montenegro) Masinac Classic Niš	3	1	1	1	4	6	−2	4		–	—	3–1	1–1
3	(Iceland) KR	3	1	0	2	6	5	+1	3		–	–	—	–
4	(Scotland) Kilmarnock	3	0	1	2	2	8	−6	1		–	–	1–5	—

Source: RSSSF
(H) Hosts
20 August 2003

Brøndby (Denmark)	2–0	(Scotland) Kilmarnock
Kjær Jensen 39'; Munch 41'	Report

Brøndby Stadium, Brøndbyvester
20 August 2003

Masinac Classic Niš (Serbia and Montenegro)	3–1	(Iceland) KR
Mitić 67'; Mladenović 85'; Stefanović 90'	Report	Jóhannesdóttir 12'

Brøndby Stadium, Brøndbyvester

22 August 2003

Brøndby (Denmark)	1–0	(Iceland) KR
Paaske Sørensen 36'	Report

Brøndby Stadium, Brøndbyvester
22 August 2003

Masinac Classic Niš (Serbia and Montenegro)	1–1	(Scotland) Kilmarnock
Jovanović 66'	Report	Seers 50'

Brøndby Stadium, Brøndbyvester

24 August 2003

Brøndby (Denmark)	4–0	(Serbia and Montenegro) Masinac Classic Niš
Munch 52'; Kjær Jensen 63'; Falk 66'; Larsen 90'	Report

Brøndby Stadium, Brøndbyvester
24 August 2003

Kilmarnock (Scotland)	1–5	(Iceland) KR
Sneddon 84'	Report	Jóhannesdóttir 37'; Sámuelsdóttir 43'; Magnúsdóttir 45', 61', 67'

Brøndby Idrætsanlæg, Brøndbyvester

=== Group B2 ===
Matches were played in Babruysk, Belarus.

Pos	Team	Pld	W	D	L	GF	GA	GD	Pts	Qualification	GBA	AEG	BOB	SCH
1	(Azerbaijan) Gömrükçü Baku	3	2	0	1	8	2	+6	6	Advance to quarter-finals	—	3–0	0–1	–
2	(Greece) Aegina	3	1	1	1	7	9	−2	4		–	—	–	4–4
3	(Belarus) Bobruichanka Bobruisk (H)	3	1	1	1	4	4	0	4		–	2–3	—	1–1
4	(Switzerland) Schwerzenbach	3	0	2	1	6	10	−4	2		1–5	–	–	—

Source: RSSSF
(H) Hosts
21 August 2003

Schwerzenbach (Switzerland)	1–5	(Azerbaijan) Gömrükçü Baku
Soltermann 44'	Report	Djafarova 6'; Sochneva 46', 87', 88'; Larionova 90'

Spartak Stadium, Mogilev
21 August 2003

Bobruichanka Bobruisk (Belarus)	2–3	(Greece) Aegina
Luchonak 56'; Lutskevich 66'	Report	Stojiljković 32', 45'; Katsaiti 68' (pen.)

Spartak Stadium, Shklow

23 August 2003

Aegina (Greece)	4–4	(Switzerland) Schwerzenbach
Katsaiti 29', 42'; Stojanović 50', 60'	Report	Zumbühl 8'; Schwarz 14'; Hügli 76', 90'

Spartak Stadium, Mogilev
23 August 2003

Gömrükçü Baku (Azerbaijan)	0–1	(Belarus) Bobruichanka Bobruisk
	Report	Malinovskaya 80'

Spartak Stadium, Shklow

25 August 2003

Bobruichanka Bobruisk (Belarus)	1–1	(Switzerland) Schwerzenbach
Aniskovtseva 54'	Report	Hügli 38'

Spartak Stadium, Shklow
25 August 2003

Gömrükçü Baku (Azerbaijan)	3–0	(Greece) Aegina
Pleshakova 34'; Cirkhlarova 89'; Zinchenko 90+3'	Report

Spartak Stadium, Mogilev

=== Group B3 ===
Matches were played in Umeå, Sweden.

Pos	Team	Pld	W	D	L	GF	GA	GD	Pts	Qualification	UME	SPR	CLU	NEW
1	(Sweden) Umeå (H)	3	3	0	0	23	1	+22	9	Advance to quarter-finals	—	–	6–0	15–0
2	(Czech Republic) Slavia Praha	3	2	0	1	6	2	+4	6		1–2	—	2–0	–
3	(Romania) Clujana Cluj-Napoca	3	0	1	2	1	9	−8	1		–	–	—	1–1
4	(Northern Ireland) Newtownabbey Strikers	3	0	1	2	1	19	−18	1		–	0–3	–	—

Source: RSSSF
(H) Hosts
21 August 2003

Umeå (Sweden)	15–0	(Northern Ireland) Newtownabbey Strikers
Ljungberg 10', 14'; Moström 42'; Julin 44'; Kalmari 52', 61'; Lindqvist 57', 66', 67', 68', 89'; Eriksson 59'; Dahlqvist 63' (pen.), 90'; Nordbrandt 86'	Report

Gammliavallen, Umeå
21 August 2003

Slavia Prague (Czech Republic)	2–0	(Romania) Clujana Cluj-Napoca
Chlumecká 16', 23'	Report

Gammliavallen, Umeå

23 August 2003

Umeå (Sweden)	6–0	(Romania) Clujana Cluj-Napoca
Julin 8'; Nordbrandt 11'; Runesson 14', 31'; Serban 23' (o.g.); Lundgren 76'	Report

Gammliavallen, Umeå
23 August 2003

Newtownabbey Strikers (Northern Ireland)	0–3	(Czech Republic) Slavia Prague
	Report	Budosová 47'; Mázlová 85'; Pěničková 88'

Gammliavallen, Umeå

25 August 2003

Slavia Prague (Czech Republic)	1–2	(Sweden) Umeå
Mocová 87'	Report	Dahlqvist 31'; Ljungberg 75'

Gammliavallen, Umeå
25 August 2003

Clujana Cluj-Napoca (Romania)	1–1	(Northern Ireland) Newtownabbey Strikers
Spânu 15'	Report	McKenna 67'

Kamratvallen, Holmsund

=== Group B4 ===
Matches were played in Voronezh, Russia.

Pos	Team	Pld	W	D	L	GF	GA	GD	Pts	Qualification	EVO	FVE	FEM	OSI
1	(Russia) Energy Voronezh (H)	3	2	1	0	24	0	+24	7	Advance to quarter-finals	—	6–0	2–0	–
2	(Italy) Foroni Verona	3	2	1	0	14	0	+14	7		–	—	1–2	15–0
3	(Hungary) Femina	3	1	0	2	3	15	−12	3		–	–	—	0–3
4	(Croatia) Osijek	3	0	0	3	0	26	−26	0		1–1	–	–	—

Source: RSSSF
(H) Hosts
21 August 2003

Foroni Verona (Italy)	10–0	(Croatia) Osijek
Gazzoli 3', 5', 27', 33', 62', 82'; Placchi 11', 90+1' (pen.); Camporese 22'; Tagliacarne 58'	Report

Tsentralnyi Profsoyuz Stadion, Voronezh
21 August 2003

Energy Voronezh (Russia)	11–0	(Hungary) Femina
Strukova 3', 6'; Zinchenko 51', 61', 66'; Skotnikova 54', 89'; Morozova 63', 68', 87'; Terekhova 82'	Report

Tsentralnyi Profsoyuz Stadion, Voronezh

23 August 2003

Energy Voronezh (Russia)	0–0	(Italy) Foroni Verona
	Report

Tsentralnyi Profsoyuz Stadion, Voronezh
23 August 2003

Femina (Hungary)	3–0	(Croatia) Osijek
Pádár 30', 70'; Schumi 80'	Report	Kozić 16'; Koljenik 19'; Baban 55'

Tsentralnyi Profsoyuz Stadion, Voronezh

Femina given 3–0 win via forfeit

25 August 2003

Foroni Verona (Italy)	4–0	(Hungary) Femina
Gazzoli 15', 44', 54', 85'	Report

Fakel Stadium, Voronezh
25 August 2003

Osijek (Croatia)	0–13	(Russia) Energy Voronezh
	Report	Morozova 10'; Danilova 16', 57', 64'; Saenko 20'; Shmachkova 27'; Zinchenko 36' (pen.), 45+1', 60', 75', 90+2' (pen.); Degai 50'; Stepanenko 61'

Tsentralnyi Profsoyuz Stadion, Voronezh

=== Group B5 ===
Matches were played at Tekstylnyk Stadium, Chernihiv; imeni Yuriya Gagarina, Chernihiv, and Spartak Stadium, Nizhyn.

Pos	Team	Pld	W	D	L	GF	GA	GD	Pts	Qualification	MFD	LCH	UNI	MHO
1	(Sweden) Malmö FF	3	3	0	0	12	1	+11	9	Advance to quarter-finals	—	–	3–0	–
2	(Ukraine) Lehenda-Cheksil (H)	3	2	0	1	6	3	+3	6		0–3	—	–	4–0
3	(Finland) United	3	1	0	2	3	6	−3	3		–	0–2	—	3–1
4	(Israel) Maccabi Holon	3	0	0	3	2	13	−11	0		1–6	–	–	—

Source: RSSSF
(H) Hosts
21 August 2003

Malmö (Sweden)	3–0	(Finland) United
Kackur 30', 57'; S. Larsson 37'	Report

Chernihiv Stadium, Chernihiv
21 August 2003

Lehenda-Cheksil (Ukraine)	4–0	(Israel) Maccabi Holon
Khodyreva 50', 70'; Kornievets 62'; Zhdanova 77'	Report

Tekstylnyk stadium, Chernihiv

23 August 2003

Maccabi Holon (Israel)	1–6	(Sweden) Malmö
Oded 74'	Report	Jönsson 5', 52'; Westerblad 20'; Kackur 58', 64'; Andersson 61'

Chernihiv Stadium, Chernihiv
23 August 2003

United (Finland)	0–2	(Ukraine) Lehenda-Cheksil
	Report	Khodyreva 26' (pen.); Apanashchenko 79'

Tekstylnyk stadium, Chernihiv

25 August 2003

Lehenda-Cheksil (Ukraine)	0–3	(Sweden) Malmö
	Report	Kackur 8', 90+4'; Andersson 13'

Tekstylnyk stadium, Chernihiv
25 August 2003

United (Finland)	3–1	(Israel) Maccabi Holon
Ruotsalainen 20', 61'; Sjölund 45'	Report	Jean 9'

Spartak Stadium, Nizhyn

=== Group B6 ===
Matches were played in Oslo, Norway.

Pos	Team	Pld	W	D	L	GF	GA	GD	Pts	Qualification	KOL	JUV	WRO	UCD
1	(Norway) Kolbotn (H)	3	3	0	0	25	3	+22	9	Advance to quarter-finals	—	–	15–2	8–0
2	(France) Juvisy	3	2	0	1	10	3	+7	6		1–2	—	–	6–1
3	(Poland) AZS Wrocław	3	1	0	2	5	18	−13	3		–	0–3	—	–
4	(Republic of Ireland) University College Dublin	3	0	0	3	1	17	−16	0		–	–	0–3	—

Source: RSSSF
(H) Hosts
21 August 2003

Kolbotn (Norway)	15–2	(Poland) AZS Wrocław
Hansen 17', 57', 80'; Rønning 24', 63', 75'; Andersen 28'; Jensen 30', 48', 55'; Galvez 65'; Gulbrandsen 71'	Report	Nazarczyk 56'; Gibek 68'

Seiersten stadion, Drøbak
21 August 2003

Juvisy (France)	6–1	(Republic of Ireland) University College Dublin
Bourdille 9', 70'; Tonazzi 42', 74'; Perraudeau 55', 58'	Report	Kissane 90'

Sofiemyr stadion, Kolbotn

23 August 2003

Kolbotn (Norway)	8–0	(Republic of Ireland) University College Dublin
Lindblom 4', 37'; Stensland 10'; Gulbrandsen 26'; Andersen 49', 57'; Stundal 71', 74'	Report

Sofiemyr stadion, Kolbotn
23 August 2003

AZS Wrocław (Poland)	0–3	(France) Juvisy
	Report	Soubeyrand 10', 32'; Guilbert 61'

Seiersten stadion, Drøbak

25 August 2003

Juvisy (France)	1–2	(Norway) Kolbotn
Perraudeau 85' (pen.)	Report	Gulbrandsen 29'; Jensen 75'

Sofiemyr stadion, Kolbotn
25 August 2003

University College Dublin (Republic of Ireland)	0–3	(Poland) AZS Wrocław
	Report	Białasek 43'; Otrębska 76'; Tarczyńska 90'

Seiersten stadion, Drøbak

=== Group B7 ===
Matches were played in Bilbao, Spain.

Pos	Team	Pld	W	D	L	GF	GA	GD	Pts	Qualification	FRA	NES	NEU	DEZ
1	(Germany) Frankfurt	3	3	0	0	19	2	+17	9	Advance to quarter-finals	—	–	7–1	4–0
2	(Spain) Athletic Club Neskak (H)	3	2	0	1	8	10	−2	6		1–8	—	2–0	–
3	(Austria) Neulengbach	3	1	0	2	2	9	−7	3		–	–	—	1–0
4	(Portugal) 1.º de Dezembro	3	0	0	3	2	10	−8	0		–	2–5	–	—

Source: RSSSF
(H) Hosts
21 August 2003

Frankfurt (Germany)	4–0	(Portugal) 1.º de Dezembro
Lingor 4'; Barucha 19'; Albertz 44'; Gomes 58' (o.g.)	Report

Estadio Urbieta, Guernica
21 August 2003

Athletic Club Neskak (Spain)	2–0	(Austria) Neulengbach
Castrillo 70' (pen.); Fernández 73'	Report

Estadio Urbieta, Guernica

23 August 2003

Frankfurt (Germany)	7–1	(Austria) Neulengbach
Lingor 6'; Affeld 10'; Grant 31'; Kliehm 33'; Albertz 45', 55'; Rastetter 81'	Report	Gstöttner 58'

Gazituaga, Zamudio
23 August 2003

1.º de Dezembro (Portugal)	2–5	(Spain) Athletic Club Neskak
Couto 61'; Brunheira 85'	Report	Ibarra 14'; Ferreira 22'; Iturregi 50', 90+2'; Angulo 88'

Las Llanas Stadium, Sestao

25 August 2003

Athletic Club Neskak (Spain)	1–8	(Germany) Frankfurt
Juaristi 36' (pen.)	Report	Grant 18'; Hansen 20'; Lingor 30', 49'; Künzer 31'; Barucha 53', 73'; Albertz 78'

San Mamés Stadium, Bilbao
25 August 2003

Neulengbach (Austria)	1–0	(Portugal) 1.º de Dezembro
Pötzl 58'	Report

Estadio de Lasesarre, Barakaldo

=== Group B8 ===
Matches were played in Sassenheim, Netherlands.

Pos	Team	Pld	W	D	L	GF	GA	GD	Pts	Qualification	FUL	TLE	CAN	KIK
1	(England) Fulham	3	3	0	0	20	2	+18	9	Advance to quarter-finals	—	–	9–1	8–0
2	(Netherlands) Ter Leede (H)	3	2	0	1	14	3	+11	6		1–3	—	8–0	5–0
3	(Moldova) Codru Anenii Noi	3	1	0	2	6	20	−14	3		–	–	—	5–3
4	(Faroe Islands) KÍ Klaksvík	3	0	0	3	3	18	−15	0		–	–	–	—

Source: RSSSF
(H) Hosts
19 August 2003

Fulham (England)	8–0	(Faroe Islands) KÍ Klaksvík
Yankey 7'; Chapman 23', 35'; Yorston 29'; Duncan 57'; Waine 70', 87'; Jerray-Silver 80'	Report

Roodemolen, Sassenheim
19 August 2003

Ter Leede (Netherlands)	8–0	(Moldova) Codru Anenii Noi
Noom 2'; Drommel 7'; Muller 25'; Witteman 45', 63'; Hogewoning 48'; Dijkhuizen 88'; van Eijk 89'	Report

Roodemolen, Sassenheim

21 August 2003

Fulham (England)	9–1	(Moldova) Codru Anenii Noi
Chapman 26'; Waine 38', 50', 84'; Yankey 42'; Hickmott 44'; McArthur 71' (pen.); Jerray-Silver 77'; Flint 81'	Report	Pufulete 63'

Roodemolen, Sassenheim
21 August 2003

Ter Leede (Netherlands)	5–0	(Faroe Islands) KÍ Klaksvík
van Eijk 7', 10'; Drommel 20'; Legemate 31'; Witteman 90+1'	Report

Roodemolen, Sassenheim

23 August 2003

Ter Leede (Netherlands)	1–3	(England) Fulham
van der Laan 45'	Report	Yorston 9', 86'; Yankey 61'

Roodemolen, Sassenheim
23 August 2003

Codru Anenii Noi (Moldova)	5–3	(Faroe Islands) KÍ Klaksvík
Pufulete 9', 51', 56', 71'; Deliu 74'	Report	Ran. Andreasen 29'; Rag. Andreasen 37'; Josephsen 41'

Roodemolen, Sassenheim
