= 2003–04 UEFA Women's Cup knockout phase =

Tournament details
- Dates: 30 October 2003 – 5 June 2004
- Teams: 8

The 2003–04 UEFA Women's Cup knockout phase began on 30 October 2003 and concluded on 15 and 5 June 2004 with the two legged tie at the Råsunda Stadium in Stockholm, Sweden and Stadion am Brentanobad in Frankfurt, Germany to decide the champions of the 2003–04 UEFA Women's Cup. A total of 8 teams competed in the knockout phase.

== Bracket ==
Quarter-finals
(Denmark) Brøndby	9	3	12
(Azerbaijan) Gömrükçü Baku	0	0	0
(Russia) Energy Voronezh	1	1	2
(Sweden) Umeå	2	2	4
(Sweden) Malmö	2	0	2
(Norway) Kolbotn	0	1	1
(Germany) Frankfurt	3	4	7
(England) Fulham	1	1	2

Semi-finals
(Denmark) Brøndby	2	0	2
(Sweden) Umeå	3	1	4
(Sweden) Malmö	0	1	1
(Germany) Frankfurt	0	4	4

Final
(Sweden) Umeå	3	5	8
(Germany) Frankfurt	0	0	0

== Quarter-finals ==
Team 1	Agg.	Team 2	1st leg	2nd leg
Brøndby (Denmark)	12–0	(Azerbaijan) Gömrükçü Baku	9–0	3–0
Energy Voronezh (Russia)	2–4	(Sweden) Umeå	1–2	1–2
Malmö (Sweden)	2–1	(Norway) Kolbotn	2–0	0–1
Frankfurt (Germany)	7–2	(England) Fulham	3–1	4–1

30 October 2003

Brøndby (Denmark)	9–0	(Azerbaijan) Gömrükçü Baku
Falk 7'; Andersen 11'; Johansen 34', 65'; Sørensen 60'; Jorgensen 79'; Bukh 81'; Larsen 87'; Mia Olsen 90'	Report

Brøndby Stadium, Brøndby
Referee: Wendy Toms (England)
29 November 2003

Gömrükçü Baku (Azerbaijan)	0–3	(Denmark) Brøndby
	Report	Jensen 14', 40'; Munch 20'

Shafa Stadium, Baku
Referee: Dagmar Damkova (Czech Republic)

Brøndby won 12–0 on aggregate.

7 November 2003

Energy Voronezh (Russia)	1–2	(Sweden) Umeå
Danilova 20'	Report	Julin 24'; Marklund 33'

Central Stadium, Voronezh
23 November 2003

Umeå (Sweden)	2–1	(Russia) Energy Voronezh
Degai 60' (o.g.); Ljungberg 90+1'	Report	Sitnikova 65'

Gammliavallen, Umeå
Referee: Ilonka Milanova Djaleva (Bulgaria)

Umeå won 4–2 on aggregate.

22 November 2003

Malmö (Sweden)	2–0	(Norway) Kolbotn
Kackur 4', 65'	Report

Idrottsplats, Malmö
Referee: Elke Günthner (Germany)
30 November 2003

Kolbotn (Norway)	1–0	(Sweden) Malmö
Galvez 67'	Report

Vallhall Arena (indoor), Oslo
Referee: Natalia Avdonchenko (Russia)

Malmö FF won 2–1 on aggregate.

2 November 2003

Frankfurt (Germany)	3–1	(England) Fulham
Kliehm 7'; Albertz 58'; Prinz 70'	Report	McArthur 10'

Stadion am Brentanobad, Frankfurt
Referee: Snjezana Focic (Croatia)
30 November 2003

Fulham (England)	1–4	(Germany) Frankfurt
Bird 80'	Report	Prinz 50'; Wunderlich 84'; Barucha 86', 90'

Kingfield Stadium, Woking
Referee: Jenny Palmqvist (Sweden)

Frankfurt won 7–2 on aggregate.

== Semi-finals ==
Team 1	Agg.	Team 2	1st leg	2nd leg
Brøndby (Denmark)	2–4	(Sweden) Umeå	2–3	0–1
Malmö (Sweden)	1–4	(Germany) Frankfurt	0–0	1–4

27 March 2004

Brøndby (Denmark)	2–3	(Sweden) Umeå
Sørensen 34'; Larsen 43' (pen.)	Report	Cederkvist 22' (o.g.); Julin 45'; Marta 80'

Brøndby Stadium, Brøndby
Referee: Anna De Toni (Italy)
4 April 2004

Umeå (Sweden)	1–0	(Denmark) Brøndby
Marta 35'	Report

Gammliavallen, Umeå
Referee: Alexandra Ihringova (Slovakia)

Umeå won 4–2 on aggregate.

28 March 2004

Malmö (Sweden)	0–0	(Germany) Frankfurt
	Report

Idrottsplats, Malmö
Referee: Dagmar Damkova (Czech Republic)
11 April 2004

Frankfurt (Germany)	4–1	(Sweden) Malmö
Jönsson 71' (o.g.); Lingor 75', 89', 90+1'	Report	Kackur 59'

Stadion am Brentanobad, Frankfurt
Referee: Natalia Avdonchenko (Russia)

Frankfurt won 4–1 on aggregate.

== Final ==
Team 1	Agg.	Team 2	1st leg	2nd leg
Umeå (Sweden)	8–0	(Germany) Frankfurt	3–0	5–0

8 May 2004
15:00 UTC+2

Umeå (Sweden)	3–0	(Germany) Frankfurt
Marta 16', 58'; Östberg 49'	Report

Råsunda, Solna
Attendance: 5,409
Referee: Floarea Cristina Ionescu (Romania)
5 June 2004
14:30 UTC+2

Frankfurt (Germany)	0–5	(Sweden) Umeå
	Report	Marta 27'; Östberg 45+2'; Sjöström 49', 70'; Moström 68'

Stadion am Brentanobad, Frankfurt
Attendance: 9,500
Referee: Claudine Brohet (Belgium)

Umeå won 8–0 on aggregate.

UEFA Women's Cup
2003-04 winners

Umeå
Second title

== Top goalscorers ==
Rank	Player	Team	Goals
1	(Italy) Chiara Gazzoli	Foroni Verona	10
2	(Finland) Heidi Kackur	Malmö FF Dam	9
3	(Ukraine) Natalia Zinchenko	Energy Voronezh	8
4	(Germany) Renate Lingor	Frankfurt	7
5	(Norway) Solveig Gulbrandsen	Kolbotn	6
