= English women's football clubs in international competitions =

This is a compilation of the results of teams representing England at the official international competitions for European women's football clubs, that is, the former UEFA Women's Cup and its successor the UEFA Women's Champions League.

England is one of five associations that have won the competition along with Spain, Germany, France, and Sweden. After completion of the 2024–25 edition England reached the top of the UEFA association rankings for the first time ever. For the 2026–27 edition England has three qualification spots, two of which will enter the competition at the League phase.

Season 2025/26 saw the addition of a secondary competition, the UEFA Women's Europa Cup. For its inaugural season, clubs from the top eight federations (including England) were not entered directly into this new competition but would enter if they were eliminated in the second or third round of Champions League qualifying.

The season also saw the introduction of an official intercontinental tournament, the FIFA Women's Champions Cup. The final stages for the inaugural tournament were held in London.

== Teams ==
Nine teams have represented England in the UEFA Women's Cup and the UEFA Women's Champions League.

Club	Founded	Region	City	Appearances	First	Last	Best result
Arsenal	1987	Greater London	London	19	2001–02	2026–27	Champions (2)
Chelsea	1992	Greater London	London	11	2015–16	2026–27	Runners-up
Manchester City	1988	North West England	Manchester	9	2016–17	2026–27	Semifinalists
Everton	1983	North West England	Liverpool	3	2007–08	2010–11	Quarterfinalists
Birmingham City	1968	West Midlands	Birmingham	2	2012–13	2013–14	Semifinalists
Bristol City	1998	South West England	Bristol	2	2011–12	2014–15	Quarterfinalists
Liverpool	1989	North West England	Liverpool	2	2014–15	2015–16	Last 32
Manchester United	2018	North West England	Manchester	2	2023–24	2025–26	League phase
Fulham	1993	Greater London	London	1	2003–04	2003–04	Quarterfinalists

Locations of the teams within England

== Qualification ==
Edition	Competition	First	Second	Third	Fourth	Fifth
2001–02 UWC	2000–01 Premier League	Arsenal (52)	Doncaster Rovers (45)	Charlton Athletic (35)	Everton (35)	Tranmere Rovers (28)
2002–03 UWC	2001–02 Premier League	Arsenal (49)	Doncaster Rovers (41)	Charlton Athletic (31)	Leeds United (26)	Everton (26)
2003–04 UWC	2002–03 Premier League	Fulham (49)	Doncaster Rovers (41)	Arsenal (40)	Charlton Athletic (34)	Birmingham City (21)
2004–05 UWC	2003–04 Premier League	Arsenal (47)	Charlton Athletic (46)	Fulham (44)	Leeds United (28)	Doncaster Rovers (27)
2005–06 UWC	2004–05 Premier League	Arsenal (48)	Charlton Athletic (41)	Everton (37)	Birmingham City (30)	Bristol Rovers (28)
2006–07 UWC	2005–06 Premier League	Arsenal (50)	Everton (44)	Charlton Athletic (39)	Doncaster Rovers (23)	Bristol Academy (20)
2007–08 UWC	2006–07 Premier League	Arsenal^{TH} (66)	Everton (52)	Charlton Athletic (50)	Bristol Academy (40)	Leeds United (37)
2008–09 UWC	2007–08 Premier League	Arsenal (62)	Everton (57)	Leeds United (40)	Bristol Academy (34)	Chelsea (32)
2009–10 UWCL	2008–09 Premier League	Arsenal (61)	Everton (61)	Chelsea (50)	Domncaster Rovers (33)	Birmingham City (33)
2010–11 UWCL	2009–10 Premier League	Arsenal (61)	Everton (50)	Chelsea (49)	Leeds Carnegie (47)	Sunderland (37)
Edition	Competition	Champions	Finalist	Semifinalist #1	Semifinalist #2	
2011–12 UWCL	2010–11 FA Cup	Arsenal	Bristol Academy	Barnet	Liverpool	
Edition	Competition	First	Second	Third	Fourth	Fifth
2012–13 UWCL	2011 Super League	Arsenal (32)	Birmingham City (29)	Everton (25)	Lincoln (21)	Bristol Academy (16)
2013–14 UWCL	2012 Super League	Arsenal (34)	Birmingham City (26)	Everton (25)	Bristol Academy (18)	Lincoln (18)
2014–15 UWCL	2013 Super League	Liverpool (36)	Bristol Academy (31)	Arsenal (30)	Birmingham City (18)	Everton (15)
2015–16 UWCL	2014 Super League	Liverpool (26)	Chelsea (26)	Birmingham City (25)	Arsenal (21)	Manchester City (19)
2016–17 UWCL	2015 Super League	Chelsea (32)	Manchester City (30)	Arsenal (27)	Sunderland (20)	Notts County (15)
2017–18 UWCL	2016 Super League	Manchester City (42)	Chelsea (37)	Arsenal (32)	Birmingham City (27)	Liverpool (25)
2018–19 UWCL	2017–18 Super League	Chelsea (44)	Manchester City (38)	Arsenal (37)	Reading (32)	Birmingham City (30)
2019–20 UWCL	2018–19 Super League	Arsenal (54)	Manchester City (47)	Chelsea (42)	Birmingham City (40)	Reading (27)
2020–21 UWCL	2019–20 Super League	Chelsea (39)	Manchester City (40)	Arsenal (36)	Manchester United (23)	Reading (21)
2021–22 UWCL	2020–21 Super League	Chelsea (57)	Manchester City (55)	Arsenal (48)	Manchester United (47)	Everton (32)
2022–23 UWCL	2021–22 Super League	Chelsea (56)	Arsenal (55)	Manchester City (47)	Manchester United (42)	Tottenham Hotspur (32)
2023–24 UWCL	2022–23 Super League	Chelsea (58)	Manchester United (56)	Arsenal (47)	Manchester City (47)	Aston Villa (37)
2024–25 UWCL	2023–24 Super League	Chelsea (55)	Manchester City (55)	Arsenal (50)	Liverpool (41)	Manchester United (35)
2025–26 UWCL	2024–25 Super League	Chelsea (60)	Arsenal^{TH} (48)	Manchester United (44)	Manchester City (43)	Brighton & Hove Albion (28)
2026–27 UWCL	2025–26 Super League	Manchester City (55)	Arsenal (51)	Chelsea (49)	Manchester United (40)	Tottenham Hotspur (36)

== Progression by season ==
Season	Teams	Earlier rounds	Round of 32	Round of 16	Quarterfinals	Semifinals	Final
2001–02 UWC	Arsenal		(Switzerland) Bern ^{1}	Not held	(France) Toulouse		
2002–03 UWC	Arsenal		(Spain) Levante ^{1}	Not held	(Russia) CSK VVS	(Denmark) Fortuna	
2003–04 UWC	Fulham		(Netherlands) Ter Leede ^{1}	Not held	(Germany) Eintracht Frankfurt		
2004–05 UWC	Arsenal			(Spain) Athletic Bilbao ^{1}	(Italy) Torres	(Sweden) Djurgården	
2005–06 UWC	Arsenal			(Russia) Lada ^{1}	(Germany) Eintracht Frankfurt		
2006–07 UWC	Arsenal			(Russia) Rossiyanka ^{1}	(Iceland) Breiðablik	(Denmark) Brøndby	(Sweden) Umeå
2007–08 UWC	Arsenal			(Austria) Neulengbach ^{1}	(France) Lyon		
2007–08 UWC	Everton		(Switzerland) Zuchwil ^{1}	(Belgium) Rapide ^{1}			
2008–09 UWC	Arsenal			(Austria) Neulengbach ^{1}	(Sweden) Umeå		
2009–10 UWCL	Arsenal		(Greece) PAOK	(Czech Republic) Sparta	(Germany) Duisburg		
2009–10 UWCL	Everton	(Norway) Strømmen ^{1}	(Norway) Røa				
2010–11 UWCL	Arsenal		(Serbia) Mašinac	(Spain) Rayo Vallecano	(Sweden) Linköping	(France) Lyon	
2010–11 UWCL	Everton	(Lithuania) Universitetas ^{1}	(Hungary) MTK	(Denmark) Brøndby	(Germany) Duisburg		
2011–12 UWCL	Arsenal		(Belarus) Bobruichanka	(Spain) Rayo	(Sweden) Göteborg	(Germany) Frankfurt	
2011–12 UWCL	Bristol Academy		(Russia) Energiya				
2012–13 UWCL	Arsenal		(Spain) Barcelona	(Germany) Turbine	(Italy) Torres	(Germany) Wolfsburg	
2012–13 UWCL	Birmingham City		(Italy) Bardolino				
2013–14 UWCL	Arsenal		(Kazakhstan) SShVSM	(Scotland) Glasgow	(England) Birmingham City		
2013–14 UWCL	Birmingham City		(Finland) PK-35	(Russia) Zorky	(England) Arsenal	(Sweden) Tyresö	
2014–15 UWCL	Bristol Academy		(Republic of Ireland) Raheny	(Spain) Barcelona	(Germany) Frankfurt		
2014–15 UWCL	Liverpool		(Sweden) Linköping				
2015–16 UWCL	Chelsea		(Scotland) Glasgow	(Germany) Wolfsburg			
2015–16 UWCL	Liverpool		(Italy) Brescia				
2016–17 UWCL	Chelsea		(Germany) Wolfsburg				
2016–17 UWCL	Manchester City		(Russia) Zvezda	(Denmark) Brøndby	(Denmark) Fortuna	(France) Lyon	
2017–18 UWCL	Chelsea		(Germany) Bayern Munich	(Sweden) Rosengård	(France) Montpellier	(Germany) Wolfsburg	
2017–18 UWCL	Manchester City		(Austria) St. Pölten	(Norway) Lillestrøm	(Sweden) Linköping	(France) Lyon	
2018–19 UWCL	Chelsea		(Bosnia and Herzegovina) SFK 2000	(Italy) Fiorentina	(France) PSG	(France) Lyon	
2018–19 UWCL	Manchester City		(Spain) Atlético Madrid				
2019–20 UWCL	Arsenal		(Italy) Fiorentina	(Czech Republic) Slavia Prague	(France) Paris Saint-Germain		
2019–20 UWCL	Manchester City		(Switzerland) Lugano	(Spain) Atlético Madrid			
2020–21 UWCL	Chelsea		(Switzerland) Servette Chênois	(Spain) Atlético Madrid	(Germany) Wolfsburg	(Germany) Bayern Munich	(Spain) Barcelona
2020–21 UWCL	Manchester City		(Sweden) Kopparbergs/Göteborg	(Italy) Fiorentina	(Spain) Barcelona		
Season	Teams	First round	Second round	Group stage	Quarterfinals	Semifinals	Final
2021–22 UWCL	Chelsea			(Italy) Juventus^{1}			
2021–22 UWCL	Manchester City		(Spain) Real Madrid				
2021–22 UWCL	Arsenal	(Netherlands) PSV	(Czech Republic) Slavia Prague	(Germany) 1899 Hoffenheim^{1}	(Germany) Wolfsburg		
2022–23 UWCL	Chelsea			(Spain) Real Madrid^{1}	(France) Lyon	(Spain) Barcelona	
2022–23 UWCL	Arsenal		(Netherlands) Ajax	(Italy) Juventus^{1}	(Germany) Bayern Munich	(Germany) Wolfsburg	
2022–23 UWCL	Manchester City	(Spain) Real Madrid					
2023–24 UWCL	Chelsea			(France) Paris FC^{1}	(Netherlands) Ajax	(Spain) Barcelona	
2023–24 UWCL	Manchester United		(France) Paris Saint-Germain FC				
2023–24 UWCL	Arsenal	(France) Paris FC					
2024–25 UWCL	Chelsea			(Netherlands) Twente^{1}	(England) Manchester City	(Spain) Barcelona	
2024–25 UWCL	Manchester City		(France) Paris FC	(Sweden) Hammarby^{1}	(England) Chelsea		
2024–25 UWCL	Arsenal	(Norway) Rosenborg	(Sweden) BK Häcken	(Italy) Juventus^{1}	(Spain) Real Madrid	(France) Lyon	(Spain) Barcelona
Season	Teams	Earlier rounds	League phase	Play-off round	Quarterfinals	Semifinals	Final
2025–26 UWCL	Arsenal		(Norway) Vålerenga^{2}	(Belgium) OH Leuven	(England) Chelsea	(France) Lyon	
2025–26 UWCL	Chelsea		(Norway) Vålerenga^{2}		(England) Arsenal		
2025–26 UWCL	Manchester United	(Norway) SK Brann	(Norway) Vålerenga^{2}	(Spain) Atlético Madrid	(Germany) Bayern Munich		
2026–27 UWCL	Manchester City						
2026–27 UWCL	Arsenal						
2026–27 UWCL	Chelsea	(Spain) Real Sociedad					

^{1} Group stage. Highest-ranked eliminated team in case of qualification, lowest-ranked qualified team in case of elimination.

^{2} League phase. Highest-ranked eliminated team in case of qualification, lowest-ranked qualified team in case of elimination.

== Results by team ==
=== Arsenal ===
2001–02 UEFA Women's Cup
Round	Opponent	1st	2nd	Agg.	Scorers
Group stage	(Switzerland) Bern (host)	4–0			Banks 2 – Ludlow – Grant
Group stage	(Israel) Hapoel Tel Aviv	7–0			Ludlow 3 – Coss – Grant – Moore – Ogawa
Group stage	(Poland) AZS Wroclaw	2–1		9 points	Banks – Spacey
Quarter-finals	(France) Toulouse	h: 1–1	a: 1–2 (a.e.t.)	2–3	Grant – Maggs

2002–03 UEFA Women's Cup
Round	Opponent	1st	2nd	Agg.	Scorers
Group stage	(Azerbaijan) Gömrükçü Baku	6–0			Banks 2 – Wheatley 2 – Grant – Ludlow
Group stage	(Spain) Levante	2–1			Maggs – F. White
Group stage	(Belgium) Eendracht Aalst	7–0		9 points	Ludlow 3 – Maggs 2 – Grant – Scott
Quarter-finals	(Russia) CSK VVS	a: 2–0	a: 1–1	3–1	MacDonald – Maggs
Semi-finals	(Denmark) Fortuna Hjørring	a: 1–3	h: 1–5	2–8	Banks 2

2004–05 UEFA Women's Cup
Round	Opponent	1st	2nd	Agg.	Scorers
Group stage	(Spain) Athletic Bilbao	2–2			Grant – F. White
Group stage	(Greece) Aegina	7–1			Fleeting 2 – Banks – Grant – Ludlow – Wheatley – F. White
Group stage	(Sweden) Djurgården (host)	1–0		7 points	Kemp
Quarter-finals	(Italy) Torres	a: 0–2	h: 4–1	4–3	Banks – Fleeting – Ludlow
Semi-finals	(Sweden) Djurgården	a: 1–1	h: 0–1	1–2	Fleeting

2005–06 UEFA Women's Cup
Round	Opponent	1st	2nd	Agg.	Scorers
Group stage	(Poland) AZS Wroclaw	3–1			Ludlow – McArthur – Sanderson
Group stage	(Russia) Lada Togliatti	1–0			Ludlow
Group stage	(Denmark) Brøndby (host)	0–1		6 points	
Quarter-finals	(Germany) Frankfurt	h: 1–1	a: 1–3	2–4	Grant – Sanderson

2006–07 UEFA Women's Cup
Round	Opponent	1st	2nd	Agg.	Scorers
Group stage	(Russia) Rossiyanka (host)	5–4			Fleeting 5
Group stage	(Hungary) Femina Budapest	6–0			Ludlow 2 – Chapman – Davison – Yankey
Group stage	(Denmark) Brøndby	1–0		9 points	Sanderson
Quarter-finals	(Iceland) Breiðablik	a: 5–0	h: 4–1	9–1	Fleeting 3 – Smith 3 – Carney – Sanderson – Yankey
Semi-finals	(Denmark) Brøndby	a: 2–2	h: 3–0	5–2	Smith 2 – Carney – Fleeting – Yankey
Final	(Sweden) Umeå	a: 1–0	h: 0–0	1–0	Scott

2007–08 UEFA Women's Cup
Round	Opponent	1st	2nd	Agg.	Scorers
Group stage	(Kazakhstan) Alma (host)	4–0			Carney 2 – Chapman – Sanderson
Group stage	(Austria) Neulengbach	7–0			Fleeting 2 – Ludlow 2 – Carney – Chapman – Grant
Group stage	(Italy) Bardolino	3–3		7 points	Fleeting – Sanderson – Smith
Quarter-finals	(France) Olympique Lyonnais	a: 0–0	h: 2–3	2–3	Smith – Yankey

2008–09 UEFA Women's Cup
Round	Opponent	1st	2nd	Agg.	Scorers
Group stage	(Switzerland) Zürich	7–2			Little 3 – Ludlow 2 – Davison – Smith
Group stage	(Austria) Neulengbach	6–0			Carney 2 – Davison – Fleeting – Little – Tracy
Group stage	(France) Olympique Lyonnais	0–3		6 points	
Quarter-finals	(Sweden) Umeå	h: 3–2	a: 0–6	3–8	Fleeting – Little – Ludlow

2009–10 UEFA Women's Champions League
Round	Opponent	1st	2nd	Agg.	Scorers
Round of 32	(Greece) PAOK	a: 9–0	h: 9–0	18–0	Little 7 – Lander 2 – Yankey 2 – Beattie – Bruton – Chapman – Coombs – Davison – Ludlow
Round of 16	(Czech Republic) Sparta Prague	a: 3–0	h: 2–0	5–0	Little 2 – Flaherty – Grant
Quarter-finals	(Germany) Duisburg	a: 1–2	h: 0–2	1–4	

2010–11 UEFA Women's Champions League
Round	Opponent	1st	2nd	Agg.	Scorers
Round of 32	(Serbia) Mašinac Niš	a: 3–1	h: 9–0	12–1	Carter 2 – Little 2 – Yankey 2 – Davison – Flaherty – Ludlow – Nobbs – E. White
Round of 16	(Spain) Rayo Vallecano	a: 0–2	h: 4–1	4–3	Chapman – Fleeting – Grant – Yankey
Quarter-finals	(Sweden) Linköping	h: 1–1	a: 2–2	3–3 (agr)	Chapman – E. White – Yankey
Semi-finals	(France) Olympique Lyonnais	a: 0–2	h: 2–3	2–5	Fleeting – E. White

2011–12 UEFA Women's Champions League
Round	Opponent	1st	2nd	Agg.	Scorers
Round of 32	(Belarus) Babruyshanka	a: 4–0	h: 6–0	10–0	Beattie 3 – Carter 2 – Chapman 2 – Nobbs 2 – E. White
Round of 16	(Spain) Rayo Vallecano	a: 1–1	h: 5–1	6–2	Little 2 – Carter – Ludlow – Nobbs – Yankey
Quarter-finals	(Sweden) Göteborg	h: 3–1	a: 0–1	3–2	Little – Nobbs – E. White
Semi-finals	(Germany) Frankfurt	h: 1–2	a: 0–2	1–4	Grant

2012–13 UEFA Women's Champions League
Round	Opponent	1st	2nd	Agg.	Scorers
Round of 32	(Spain) Barcelona	a: 3–0	h: 4–0	7–0	Beattie 4 – Chapman – Little – Nobbs
Round of 16	(Germany) Turbine Potsdam	h: 2–1	a: 4–3	6–4	Smith 3 – E. White 2 – Chapman
Quarter-finals	(Italy) Torres	h: 3–1	a: 1–0	4–1	Fahey – Little – Nobbs – Smith
Semi-finals	(Germany) Wolfsburg	h: 0–2	a: 1–2	1–4	Little

2013–14 UEFA Women's Champions League
Round	Opponent	1st	2nd	Agg.	Scorers
Round of 32	(Kazakhstan) CSHVSM-Kairat	a: 7–1	h: 11–1	18–2	Carter 5 – Little 5 – Nobbs 3 – Ayisi – Chapman – Weir – White – Yankey
Round of 16	(Scotland) Glasgow City	h: 3–0	a: 3–2	6–2	Carter 2 – Houghton – Nobbs – Scott – Yankey
Quarter-finals	(England) Birmingham City	h: 0–1	a: 0–2	0–3	

2019–20 UEFA Women's Champions League
Round	Opponent	1st	2nd	Agg.	Scorers
Round of 32	(Italy) Fiorentina	a: 4–0	h: 2–0	6–0	Miedema 3 – Little 2 – Evans
Round of 16	(Czech Republic) Slavia Praha	h: 5–2	a: 8–0	13–2	Miedema 7 – Van de Donk 3 – Little 2 – Roord
Quarter-finals	(France) Paris Saint-Germain	1–2 (N)			Mead

2021–22 UEFA Women's Champions League
Round	Opponent	1st	2nd	Agg.	Scorers
Qualifying first round	(Kazakhstan) Okzhetpes	4–0 (N)			Iwabuchi – Little – Mead – Parris
Qualifying first round	(Netherlands) PSV	3–1 (N)			Iwabuchi 2 – Miedema
Qualifying second round	(Czech Republic) Slavia Prague	a: 3–0	h: 4–0	7–0	Miedema 4 – Little 2 – Parris
Group stage	(Spain) FC Barcelona	1–4	0–4		Maanum
Group stage	(Germany) 1899 Hoffenheim	4–0	1–4		Little – Heath – Williamson – Maanum
Group stage	(Denmark) Køge	5–1	3–0	9 points (2nd)	Foord 2 – Catley – Parris – Patten – Nobbs – Wubben-Moy – Miedema
Quarter-finals	(Germany) Wolfsburg	h: 1–1	a: 0–2	1–3	Wubben-Moy

2022–23 UEFA Women's Champions League
Round	Opponent	1st	2nd	Agg.	Scorers
Qualifying second round	(Netherlands) Ajax	h: 2–2	a: 1–0	3–2	Miedema – Little – Blackstenius
Group stage	(France) Olympique Lyonnais	a: 5–1	h: 0–1		Foord 2 – Mead 2 – Maanum
Group stage	(Switzerland) FC Zürich	h: 3–1	a: 9–1		Maanum 3 – Hurtig 2 – Foord 2 – Blackstenius 2 – Nobbs – Little – Iwabuchi
Group stage	(Italy) Juventus	a: 1–1	h: 1–0	13 points (1st)	Miedema 2
Quarter-finals	(Germany) Bayern Munich	a: 0–1	h: 2–0	2–1	Maanum – Blackstenius
Semi-finals	(Germany) Wolfsburg	a: 2–2	h: 2–3	4–5	Blackstenius 2 – Rafaelle – Beattie

2023–24 UEFA Women's Champions League
Round	Opponent	1st	2nd	Agg.	Scorers
Qualifying first round	(Sweden) Linköping	3–0 (a)			Foord – Hurtig – Blackstenius
Qualifying first round	(France) Paris FC	3–3 (n) (a.e.t., lost 2–4 on pens)			Russo 2 – Beattie

2024–25 UEFA Women's Champions League
Round	Opponent	1st	2nd	Agg.	Scorers
Qualifying first round	(Scotland) Rangers	6–0 (h)			Foord 4 – Russo – Little
Qualifying first round	(Norway) Rosenborg	1–0 (h)			Maanum
Qualifying second round	(Sweden) BK Häcken	a: 0–1	h: 4–0	4–1	Wälti – Caldentey – Mead – Maanum
Group stage	(Germany) Bayern Munich	a: 2–5	h: 3–2	15 points (1st)	Caldentey 2 – Codina – Russo
Group stage	(Norway) FC Vålerenga	h: 4–1	a: 3–1	15 points (1st)	Russo 3 – Fox – Foord – Caldentey – Maanum
Group stage	(Italy) Juventus	a: 4–0	h: 1–0	15 points (1st)	Maanum – Blackstenius – Caldentey – Foord – Hurtig
Quarter-finals	(Spain) Real Madrid	a: 0–2	h: 3–0	3–2	Russo 2 – Caldentay
Semi-finals	(France) Olympique Lyonnais	h: 1–2	a: 4–1	5–3	Caldentey 2 – Russo – Foord
Final	(Spain) Barcelona	1–0 (n)			Blackstenius

2025–26 UEFA Women's Champions League
Round	Opponent	1st	2nd	Agg.	Scorers
League phase	(France) OL Lyonnes (h)	1–2		12 points (5th)	Russo
League phase	(Portugal) Benfica (a)	0–2		12 points (5th)	Mead – Russo
League phase	(Germany) Bayern Munich (a)	3–2		12 points (5th)	Fox – Caldentay
League phase	(Spain) Real Madrid (h)	2–1		12 points (5th)	Russo 2
League phase	(Netherlands) Twente (h)	1–0		12 points (5th)	Mead
League phase	(Belgium) OH Leuven (a)	0–3		12 points (5th)	Smith – Mead
Play-off round	(Belgium) OH Leuven	a: 0–4	h: 3–1	7–1	Russo 3 – Maanum 2 – Smith – Caldentay
Quarter-finals	(England) Chelsea	h:3–1	a:1–0	3–2	Blackstenius – Kelly – Russo
Semi-finals	(France) OL Lyonnes	h:2–1	a:3–1	3–4	Smith – Russo

2026 FIFA Women's Champions Cup
Round	Opponent	1st	2nd	Agg.	Scorers
Semi-finals	(Morocco) AS FAR	6–0 (n)			Russo 2 – Blackstenius – Maanum – Caldentay – Smith
Final	(Brazil) Corinthians	3–2 (h) (a.e.t)			Smith – Wubben-Moy – Foord

2026–27 UEFA Women's Champions League
Round	Opponent	1st	2nd	Agg.	Scorers
League phase	(Denmark) Køge (h)	1–0			Russo
League phase	(France) Paris FC (a)	2–2			Russo – Stanway
League phase	(Portugal) Benfica (h)	3–0			Russo 3
League phase	(Spain) Barcelona (a)	1–1			Maanum
League phase	(France) OL Lyonnes (h)				
League phase	(Italy) Inter Milan (a)				

=== Birmingham City ===
2012–13 UEFA Women's Champions League
Round	Opponent	1st	2nd	Agg.	Scorers
Round of 32	(Italy) Bardolino	h: 2–0	a: 0–3 (a.e.t.)	2–3	Harrop – Williams

2013–14 UEFA Women's Champions League
Round	Opponent	1st	2nd	Agg.	Scorers
Round of 32	(Finland) PK–35	a: 3–0	h: 1–0	4–0	Harrop – Lawley – Linnett – Weston
Round of 16	(Russia) Zorky Krasnogorsk	a: 2–0	h: 5–2	7–2	Christiansen 2 – Linnett 2 – Harrop – Lawley – Potter
Quarter-finals	(England) Arsenal	a: 1–0	h: 2–0	3–0	Allen 2 – Linnett
Semi-finals	(Sweden) Tyresö	h: 0–0	a: 0–3	0–3	

=== Bristol City ===
2011–12 UEFA Women's Champions League
Round	Opponent	1st	2nd	Agg.	Scorers
Round of 32	(Russia) Energiya Voronezh	h: 1–1	a: 2–4	3–5	Curson – Fishlock – Heatherson

2014–15 UEFA Women's Champions League
Round	Opponent	1st	2nd	Agg.	Scorers
Round of 32	(Republic of Ireland) Raheny United	a: 4–0	h: 2–1	6–1	Harding 2 – Pablos – James – Watts
Round of 16	(Spain) Barcelona	a: 1–0	h: 1–1	2–1	Watts
Quarter-finals	(Germany) Frankfurt	h: 0–5	a: 0–7	0–12	

=== Chelsea ===
2015–16 UEFA Women's Champions League
Round	Opponent	1st	2nd	Agg.	Scorers
Round of 32	(Scotland) Glasgow City	h: 1–0	a: 3–0	4–0	Kirby 2 – Aluko – Flaherty
Round of 16	(Germany) Wolfsburg	h: 1–2	a: 0–2	1–4	

2016–17 UEFA Women's Champions League
Round	Opponent	1st	2nd	Agg.	Scorers
Round of 32	(Germany) Wolfsburg	h: 0–3	a: 1–1	1–4	Aluko

2017–18 UEFA Women's Champions League
Round	Opponent	1st	2nd	Agg.	Scorers
Round of 32	(Germany) Bayern Munich	h: 1–0	a: 1–2	2–2 (agr)	Kirby – Spence
Round of 16	(Sweden) Rosengård	h: 3–0	a: 1–0	4–0	Bachmann – Flaherty – Kirby – Ji
Quarter-finals	(France) Montpellier	a: 2–0	a: 3–1	5–1	Kirby 2 – Ji – Cuthbert – Bachmann
Semi-finals	(Germany) Wolfsburg	h: 1–3	a: 0–2	1–5	Ji

2018–19 UEFA Women's Champions League
Round	Opponent	1st	2nd	Agg.	Scorers
Round of 32	(Bosnia and Herzegovina) SFK 2000	a: 5–0	h: 6–0	11–0	Bright – Spence 2 – Kirby 2 – Thorisdottir – Ji – Engman – Mjelde – Blundell – Cuthbert
Round of 16	(Italy) Fiorentina	h: 1–0	a: 6–0	7–0	Kirby 3 – Carney – Spence – Cuthbert – Bachmann
Quarter-finals	(France) Paris Saint-Germain	h: 2–0	a: 1–2	3–2	Blundell – Cuthbert – Mjelde
Semi-finals	(France) Lyon	a: 1–2	h: 1–1	2–3	Cuthbert – Ji

2020–21 UEFA Women's Champions League
Round	Opponent	1st	2nd	Agg.	Scorers
Round of 32	(Portugal) Benfica	a: 5–0	h: 3–0	8–0	England 3 – Kirby 2 – Bright – Kerr – Harder
Round of 16	(Spain) Atlético Madrid	h: 2–0	a: 1–1	3–1	Mjelde 2 – Kirby
Quarter-finals	(Germany) VfL Wolfsburg	h: 2–1	a: 3–0	5–1	Kerr 2 – Harder 2 – Kirby
Semi-finals	(France) Lyon	a: 1–2	h: 4–1	5–3	Kirby 2 – Leupolz – Ji – Harder
Final	(Spain) Barcelona	0–4			

2021–22 UEFA Women's Champions League
Round	Opponent	1st	2nd	Agg.	Scorers
Group stage	(Germany) VfL Wolfsburg	3–3	0–4		Kerr – England – Harder
Group stage	(Italy) Juventus	2–1	0–0		Cuthbert – Harder
Group stage	(Switzerland) Servette Chênois	7–0	1–0	11 points (3rd)	Kerr 3 – Kirby 2 – Leupolz – Fleming – Reiten

2022–23 UEFA Women's Champions League
Round	Opponent	1st	2nd	Agg.	Scorers
Group stage	(France) Paris Saint-Germain	a: 1–0	h: 3–0		James 2 – Bright – Kerr
Group stage	(Albania) Vllaznia	h: 8–0	a: 4–0		Kerr 4 – Harder 3 – Svitková 2 – Ingle – Kirby – Mjelde
Group stage	(Spain) Real Madrid	h: 2–0	a: 1–1	16 points (1st)	Ingle – Cuthbert
Quarter-finals	(France) Lyon	a: 1–0	h: 1–2	2–2 (a.e.t., won 4–3 on pens)	Reiten – Mjelde
Semi-finals	(Spain) Barcelona	h: 0–1	a: 1–1	1–2	Reiten

2023–24 UEFA Women's Champions League
Round	Opponent	1st	2nd	Agg.	Scorers
Group stage	(Spain) Real Madrid	a: 2–2	h: 2–1		Charles – Kerr – Reiten
Group stage	(Sweden) BK Häcken	h: 0–0	a: 3–1		Cuthbert 2 – Kerr
Group stage	(France) Paris FC	a: 4–0	h: 4–1	14 points (1st)	Kerr 3 – Ingle – Kirby – Fishel – Reiten – Mjelde
Quarter-finals	(Netherlands) Ajax	a: 3–0	h: 1–1	4–1	Nüsken 2 – James – Ramírez
Semi-finals	(Spain) Barcelona	a: 1–0	h: 0–2	1–2	Cuthbert

2024–25 UEFA Women's Champions League
Round	Opponent	1st	2nd	Agg.	Scorers
Group stage	(Spain) Real Madrid	h: 3–2	a: 2–1		Macario 2 – Nüsken – Reiten – Ramírez
Group stage	(Netherlands) Twente	a: 3–1	h: 6–1		Beever-Jones – Hamano – Reiten – Macario – Jean-François – Ramírez – Nüsken – Périsset
Group stage	(Scotland) Celtic	a: 2–1	h: 3–0	18 points (1st)	Hamano – Lawrence – Bronze – Kaptein – Périsset
Quarter-finals	(England) Manchester City	a: 0–2	h: 3–0	3–2	Baltimore – Björn – Ramírez
Semi-finals	(Spain) Barcelona	a: 1–4	h: 1–4	2–8	Baltimore – Kaptein

2025–26 UEFA Women's Champions League
Round	Opponent	1st	2nd	Agg.	Scorers
League phase	(Netherlands) Twente (a)	1–1		14 points (3rd)	Baltimore
League phase	(France) Paris FC (h)	4–0		14 points (3rd)	Baltimore – Rytting Kaneryd – Thompson – Cuthbert
League phase	(Austria) St. Pölten (a)	0–6		14 points (3rd)	Macario 2 – Kerr 2 – Kaptein
League phase	(Spain) Barcelona (h)	1–1		14 points (3rd)	Carpenter
League phase	(Italy) Roma (h)	6–0		14 points (3rd)	Kaptein – Rytting Kaneryd – Nüsken – Hamano – Bronze
League phase	(Germany) VfL Wolfsburg (a)	1–2		14 points (3rd)	Bronze – Kerr
Quarter-finals	(England) Arsenal	a:1–3	h:1–0	2–3	James – Nüsken

2026–27 UEFA Women's Champions League
Round	Opponent	1st	2nd	Agg.	Scorers
Qualifying round	(Spain) Real Sociedad	h: 5–2	a: 1–0	6–2	Girma – Buurman – Malard 2 – James – Walsh
League phase	Austria Wien (h)	1–0			Kaptein
League phase	(France) OL Lyonnes (a)	0–0			
League phase	(Italy) Roma (h)	2–0			Buchanan – Carpenter
League phase	(Sweden) BK Häcken (a)	0–0			
League phase	(France) Paris Saint-Germain (h)				
League phase	(Belgium) OH Leuven (a)				

=== Everton ===
2007–08 UEFA Women's Cup
Round	Opponent	1st	2nd	Agg.	Scorers
Group stage	(Lithuania) Gintra Universitetas (host)	4–0			Evans – Handley – Easton – Unitt
Group stage	(Northern Ireland) Glentoran	11–0			Kane 3 – Duggan 2 – Evans – Handley – Johnson – McDougall – Westwood – Williams
Group stage	(Switzerland) Zuchwil	3–1		9 points	Handley 2 – Williams 2 – Whelan
Group stage	(Belgium) Rapide Wezemaal (host)	1–2			Evans
Group stage	(Germany) Frankfurt	1–2			Williams
Group stage	(Iceland) Valur	3–1		3 points	Dowie 2 – Handley

2009–10 UEFA Women's Champions League
Round	Opponent	1st	2nd	Agg.	Scorers
Qualifiers (group stage)	(Croatia) Osijek (host)	3–1			Duggan – Williams
Qualifiers (group stage)	(Estonia) Levadia Tallinn	7–0			Scott 3 – Dowie 2 – Westwood – Williams
Qualifiers (group stage)	(Norway) Team Strømmen	1–0		9 points	Hinnigan
Round of 32	(Norway) Røa	a: 0–3	h: 2–0	2–3	Hinnigan – Westwood

2010–11 UEFA Women's Champions League
Round	Opponent	1st	2nd	Agg.	Scorers
Qualifiers (group stage)	(Faroe Islands) KÍ	6–0			Williams 2 – Dowie – Duggan – Harries – Hinnigan
Qualifiers (group stage)	(North Macedonia) Borec Veles	10–0			Parris 2 – Dowie – Duggan – Greenwood – Handley – Hinnigan – Scott – Williams
Qualifiers (group stage)	(Lithuania) Gintra Universitetas (host)	7–0		9 points	Handley 2 – Dowie – Duggam – Harries – Hinnigan – Unitt
Round of 32	(Hungary) MTK	a: 0–0	h: 7–1	7–1	Chaplen 3 – Duggan 2 – Dowie
Round of 16	(Denmark) Brøndby	a: 4–1	h: 1–1	5–2	Chaplen 2 – Duggan – Scott – Williams
Quarter-finals	(Germany) Duisburg	a: 1–3	h: 1–2	2–5	Dowie – Harries

=== Fulham ===
2003–04 UEFA Women's Cup
Round	Opponent	1st	2nd	Agg.	Scorers
Group stage	(Faroe Islands) KÍ	8–0			Chapman 2 – Waine 2 – Duncan – Jerray-Silver – Yankey – Yorston
Group stage	(Moldova) Codru Anenii Noi	9–1			Waine 3 – Chapman – Hickmott – Flint – Jerray-Silver – McArthur – Yankey
Group stage	(Netherlands) Saestum (host)	3–1		9 points	Yorston 2 – Yankey
Quarter-finals	(Germany) Frankfurt	a: 1–3	h: 1–4	2–7	Bird – McArthur

=== Liverpool ===
2014–15 UEFA Women's Champions League
Round	Opponent	1st	2nd	Agg.	Scorers
Round of 32	(Sweden) Linköping	h: 2–1	a: 0–3	2–4	Davison – Dowie

2015–16 UEFA Women's Champions League
Round	Opponent	1st	2nd	Agg.	Scorers
Round of 32	(Italy) Brescia	a: 0–1	h: 0–1	0–2	

=== Manchester City ===
2016–17 UEFA Women's Champions League
Round	Opponent	1st	2nd	Agg.	Scorers
Round of 32	(Russia) Zvezda Perm	h: 2–0	a: 4–0	6–0	Beattie 2 – Bronze 2 – Christiansen – Scott
Round of 16	(Denmark) Brøndby	h: 1–0	a: 1–1	2–1	Duggan – Walsh
Quarter-finals	(Denmark) Fortuna Hjørring	a: 1–0	1–0	2–0	Bronze – Lloyd
Semi-finals	(France) Olympique Lyonnais	h: 1–3	1–0	2–3	Asllani – Lloyd

2017–18 UEFA Women's Champions League
Round	Opponent	1st	2nd	Agg.	Scorers
Round of 32	(Austria) St. Pölten	a: 3–0	h: 3–0	6–0	Parris 2 – Houghton – Lawley – Scott – Stokes
Round of 16	(Norway) Lillestrøm	a: 5–0	h: 2–1	7–1	Christiansen 2 – Ross 2 – Stokes – Emslie – Parris
Quarter-finals	(Sweden) Linköping	h: 2–0	a: 5–3	7–3	Ross 2 – Stanway 2 – Parris – Beattie – Christiansen
Semi-finals	(France) Lyon	h: 0–0	a: 0–1	0–1	

2018–19 UEFA Women's Champions League
Round	Opponent	1st	2nd	Agg.	Scorers
Round of 32	(Spain) Atlético Madrid	a: 1–1	h: 0–2	1–3	Bonner

2019–20 UEFA Women's Champions League
Round	Opponent	1st	2nd	Agg.	Scorers
Round of 32	(Switzerland) FF Lugano 1976	a: 7–1	h: 4–0	11–1	Beckie 4 – Bremer 3 -Weir 2 – Stanway – Mannion
Round of 16	(Spain) Atlético Madrid	h: 1–1	a: 1–2	2–3	Beckie – Bremer

2020–21 UEFA Women's Champions League
Round	Opponent	1st	2nd	Agg.	Scorers
Round of 32	(Sweden) Kopparbergs/Göteborg	a: 2–1	h: 3–0	5–1	Stanway 3 – Mewis – Hemp
Round of 16	(Italy) Fiorentina	h: 3–0	a: 5–0	8–0	White 3 – Mewis 3 – Hemp – Weir
Quarter-finals	(Spain) Barcelona	a: 0–3	h: 2–1	2–4	Beckie – Mewis

2021–22 UEFA Women's Champions League
Round	Opponent	1st	2nd	Agg.	Scorers
Second qualifying round	(Spain) Real Madrid	a: 1–1	h: 0–1	1–2	Weir

2022–23 UEFA Women's Champions League
Round	Opponent	1st	2nd	Agg.	Scorers
Qualifying first round	(Kazakhstan) Tomiris-Turan	6–0 (n)			Shaw – Hemp – Losada – Castellanos – Sharifova
Qualifying first round	(Spain) Real Madrid	0–1 (a)			

2024–25 UEFA Women's Champions League
Round	Opponent	1st	2nd	Agg.	Scorers
Second qualifying round	(France) Paris FC	a: 5–0	h: 3–0	8–0	Shaw 2 – Park 2 – Kelly 2 – Miedema – Fowler
Group stage	(Spain) Barcelona	h: 2–0	a: 0–3		Layzell – Shaw
Group stage	(Austria) SKN St. Pölten	a: 3–2	h: 2–0		Kennedy – Fujino – Fowler – Murphy – Casparij
Group stage	(Sweden) Hammarby	h: 2–0	a: 2–1	15 points (2nd)	Shaw 2 – Blindkilde Brown – Fujino
Quarter-finals	(England) Chelsea	h: 2–0	a: 0–3	2–3	Miedema 2

2026–27 UEFA Women's Champions League
Round	Opponent	1st	2nd	Agg.	Scorers
League phase	(Germany) Bayern Munich (a)	2–2			Mead – Wamser
League phase	(Spain) Real Madrid (h)	1–1			Shaw
League phase	(France) Paris Saint-Germain (h)	1–1			Shaw
League phase	(Italy) Inter Milan (a)	4–1			Fujino 2 – Casparij – Clinton
League phase	(Sweden) BK Häcken (a)				
League phase	Austria Wien (h)				

=== Manchester United ===
2023–24 UEFA Women's Champions League
Round	Opponent	1st	2nd	Agg.	Scorers
Second qualifying round	(France) Paris Saint-Germain	h: 1–1	a: 1–3	2–4	Malard – Naalsund

2025–26 UEFA Women's Champions League
Round	Opponent	1st	2nd	Agg.	Scorers
Qualifying second round	(Netherlands) PSV	4–0 (n)			Terland 3 – Bizet
Qualifying second round	(Sweden) Hammarby	1–0 (a)			Terland
Qualifying third round	(Norway) SK Brann	a: 1–0	h: 3–0	3–1	Terland 3
League phase	(Norway) Vålerenga (h)	1–0		12 points (6th)	Le Tissier
League phase	(Spain) Atlético Madrid (a)	0–1		12 points (6th)	Rolfö
League phase	(France) Paris Saint-Germain (h)	2–1		12 points (6th)	Malard – Rolfö
League phase	(Germany) VfL Wolfsburg (a)	5–2		12 points (6th)	Rolfö – Malard
League phase	(France) Lyon (h)	0–3		12 points (6th)	
League phase	(Italy) Juventus (a)	0–1		12 points (6th)	Park
Knockout phase play-offs	(Spain) Atlético Madrid	a: 0–2	h: 3–0	5–0	Zigiotti Olme 2 – Terland – Malard – Park
Quarter-finals	(Germany) Bayern Munich	h:2–3	a:2–1	3–5	Le Tissier – Lundkvist – Malard
