= 2003 in Norwegian football =

Football in Norway
- Season: 2003

Men's football
- Tippeligaen: Rosenborg
- 1. divisjon: HamKam
- 2. divisjon: Pors Grenland (Group 1); Kongsvinger (Group 2); Vard Haugesund (Group 3); Tromsdalen (Group 4)
- Cupen: Rosenborg

Women's football
- Toppserien: Trondheims-Ørn
- 1. divisjon: Sandviken
- Cupen: Medkila

The 2003 season was the 98th season of competitive football in Norway.

== Men's football ==
=== League season ===
==== Tippeligaen ====
Pos	Team	Pld	W	D	L	GF	GA	GD	Pts	Qualification or relegation
1	Rosenborg (C)	26	19	4	3	68	28	+40	61	Qualification for the Champions League second qualifying round
2	Bodø/Glimt	26	14	5	7	45	30	+15	47	Qualification for the UEFA Cup second qualifying round
3	Stabæk	26	11	9	6	51	35	+16	42	Qualification for the UEFA Cup second qualifying round
4	Odd Grenland	26	11	5	10	46	43	+3	38	Qualification for the UEFA Cup second qualifying round
5	Viking	26	9	10	7	46	34	+12	37	
6	Brann	26	10	7	9	45	47	−2	37	
7	Lillestrøm	26	10	7	9	33	35	−2	37	
8	Sogndal	26	9	8	9	43	46	−3	35	
9	Molde	26	9	4	13	32	41	−9	31	
10	Lyn	26	8	6	12	34	45	−11	30	
11	Tromsø	26	8	5	13	30	52	−22	29	
12	Vålerenga (O)	26	6	10	10	30	33	−3	28	Qualification for the relegation play-offs
13	Aalesund (R)	26	7	7	12	30	43	−13	28	Relegation to First Division
14	Bryne (R)	26	7	1	18	35	56	−21	22	Relegation to First Division

Source: fotball.no
Rules for classification: 1) points; 2) goal difference; 3) number of goals scored.
(C) Champions; (O) Play-off winners; (R) Relegated

===== Play-offs =====
November 10: Sandefjord – Vålerenga 0–0

November 22: Vålerenga – Sandefjord 5–3 (agg. 5–3)

Vålerenga stay up.

===== Top scorers =====
17 goals: Harald Martin Brattbakk, Rosenborg

15 goals: Frode Johnsen, Rosenborg

13 goals: Håvard Flo, Sogndal

11 goals: Magne Hoseth, Molde

Erik Nevland, Viking

10 goals: Edwin van Ankeren, Odd Grenland

Thomas Finstad, Stabæk

==== 1. divisjon ====
Pos	Team	Pld	W	D	L	GF	GA	GD	Pts	Promotion or relegation
1	HamKam (C, P)	30	19	6	5	60	29	+31	63	Promotion to Tippeligaen
2	Fredrikstad (P)	30	19	5	6	68	37	+31	62	Promotion to Tippeligaen
3	Sandefjord	30	19	4	7	71	41	+30	61	Qualification for the promotion play-offs
4	Raufoss	30	17	5	8	75	47	+28	56	
5	Hønefoss BK	30	16	7	7	55	41	+14	55	
6	Haugesund	30	13	10	7	53	42	+11	49	
7	Mandalskameratene	30	14	7	9	57	51	+6	49	
8	Skeid	30	13	6	11	46	47	−1	45	
9	Start	30	12	4	14	53	50	+3	40	
10	Strømsgodset	30	10	7	13	56	58	−2	37	
11	Hødd	30	9	8	13	51	54	−3	35	
12	Moss	30	8	11	11	34	39	−5	35	
13	Bærum (R)	30	7	6	17	34	58	−24	27	Relegation to Second Division
14	Oslo Øst (Note: Oslo Øst were deducted a total 2 points.) (R)	30	5	7	18	36	67	−31	20	Relegation to Second Division
15	Ørn-Horten (R)	30	5	5	20	40	83	−43	20	Relegation to Second Division
16	Alta (R)	30	3	4	23	31	76	−45	13	Relegation to Second Division

Source: nifs.no
Rules for classification: 1) points; 2) goal difference; 3) number of goals scored.
(C) Champions; (P) Promoted; (R) Relegated

==== 2. divisjon ====
===== Group 1 =====
Pos	Team	Pld	W	D	L	GF	GA	GD	Pts	Promotion or relegation
1	Pors Grenland	26	17	5	4	69	28	+41	56	Promotion to First Division
2	FK Tønsberg	26	12	10	4	57	35	+22	46	
3	Kvik Halden	26	13	7	6	52	41	+11	46	
4	Tollnes	26	11	9	6	53	45	+8	42	
5	Larvik Fotball	26	11	6	9	45	28	+17	39	
6	Frigg	26	10	9	7	46	43	+3	39	
7	Kjelsås	26	8	9	9	32	36	−4	33	
8	Stabæk 2	26	7	10	9	37	32	+5	31	
9	Sprint-Jeløy	26	7	9	10	42	52	−10	30	
10	Odd Grenland 2	26	8	6	12	38	54	−16	30	
11	Follo	26	8	5	13	36	48	−12	29	
12	Jerv (R)	26	6	8	12	40	59	−19	26	Relegation to Third Division
13	Borg Fotball (R)	26	5	9	12	35	56	−21	24	Relegation to Third Division
14	Runar (R)	26	5	6	15	35	60	−25	21	Relegation to Third Division

(R) Relegated

===== Group 2 =====
Pos	Team	Pld	W	D	L	GF	GA	GD	Pts	Promotion or relegation
1	Kongsvinger (P)	26	22	4	0	62	23	+39	70	Promotion to First Division
2	Ullensaker/Kisa	26	22	0	4	72	24	+48	66	
3	Nybergsund	26	16	7	3	74	30	+44	55	
4	Byåsen	26	15	1	10	54	45	+9	46	
5	Skjetten	26	14	3	9	65	43	+22	45	
6	Lørenskog	26	11	2	13	48	56	−8	35	
7	Eidsvold Turn	26	10	4	12	43	44	−1	34	
8	Gjøvik-Lyn	26	9	6	11	56	50	+6	33	
9	Lillestrøm 2	26	9	2	15	53	67	−14	29	
10	Molde 2	26	7	6	13	50	53	−3	27	
11	Mercantile	26	7	5	14	41	60	−19	26	
12	FF Lillehammer (R)	26	7	3	16	36	66	−30	24	Relegation to Third Division
13	Averøykameratene (R)	26	7	3	16	33	68	−35	24	Relegation to Third Division
14	Clausenengen (R)	26	2	2	22	32	90	−58	8	Relegation to Third Division

(P) Promoted; (R) Relegated

===== Group 3 =====
Pos	Team	Pld	W	D	L	GF	GA	GD	Pts	Promotion or relegation
1	Vard Haugesund (P)	26	21	1	4	91	27	+64	64	Promotion to First Division
2	Løv-Ham	26	18	2	6	69	31	+38	56	
3	Åsane	26	15	3	8	69	41	+28	48	
4	Hovding	26	14	3	9	55	33	+22	45	
5	Fyllingen	26	11	5	10	61	56	+5	38	
6	Brann 2	26	11	5	10	50	57	−7	38	
7	Ålgård	26	12	0	14	53	64	−11	36	
8	Viking 2	26	8	9	9	37	37	0	33	
9	Klepp	26	9	5	12	51	47	+4	32	
10	Vidar	26	10	1	15	29	71	−42	31	
11	Fana	26	9	3	14	41	51	−10	30	
12	Nest-Sotra (R)	26	8	5	13	40	48	−8	29	Relegation to Third Division
13	Skarbøvik (R)	26	8	1	17	39	68	−29	25	Relegation to Third Division
14	Langevåg (R)	26	5	3	18	18	72	−54	18	Relegation to Third Division

(P) Promoted; (R) Relegated

===== Group 4 =====
Pos	Team	Pld	W	D	L	GF	GA	GD	Pts	Promotion or relegation
1	Tromsdalen (P)	26	21	2	3	75	21	+54	65	Promotion to First Division
2	Strindheim	26	18	5	3	98	33	+65	59	
3	Levanger	26	15	5	6	83	36	+47	50	
4	Rosenborg 2	26	14	2	10	65	49	+16	44	
5	Mo	26	11	7	8	53	39	+14	40	
6	Lofoten	26	12	4	10	41	46	−5	40	
7	Nidelv	26	11	6	9	56	51	+5	39	
8	Vesterålen	26	11	2	13	58	60	−2	35	
9	Narvik	26	9	5	12	46	51	−5	32	
10	Skarp	26	9	4	13	57	62	−5	31	
11	Steinkjer	26	9	2	15	47	65	−18	29	
12	Hammerfest (R)	26	9	2	15	43	75	−32	29	Relegation to Third Division
13	Bossekop (R)	26	8	2	16	33	57	−24	26	Relegation to Third Division
14	Skjervøy (R)	26	1	0	25	20	130	−110	3	Relegation to Third Division

(P) Promoted; (R) Relegated

=== Norwegian Cup ===
==== Final ====
9 November 2003
13:15 CET (UTC+1)

Bodø/Glimt	1–3 (a.e.t.)	Rosenborg
Johansen 28'	Report	F. Johnsen 35'; Solli 105', 120'

Ullevaal Stadion, Oslo
Attendance: 25,447
Referee: Terje Hauge (Olsvik)

== Women's football ==
=== League season ===
==== Toppserien ====
Pos	Team	Pld	W	D	L	GF	GA	GD	Pts	Qualification or relegation
1	Trondheims-Ørn (C)	18	15	2	1	53	7	+46	47	Qualification for the UEFA Women's Cup second qualifying round
2	Kolbotn	18	13	0	5	63	28	+35	39	
3	Asker	18	12	3	3	54	20	+34	39	
4	Røa	18	7	6	5	23	27	−4	27	
5	Fløya	18	8	1	9	28	40	−12	25	
6	Arna-Bjørnar	18	6	4	8	43	48	−5	22	
7	Team Strømmen	18	6	2	10	33	47	−14	20	
8	Klepp	18	3	8	7	25	36	−11	17	
9	Liungen (R)	18	5	2	11	32	45	−13	17	Relegation to First Division
10	Larvik (R)	18	0	2	16	14	70	−56	2	Relegation to First Division

Source: NIFS
Rules for classification: 1) points; 2) goal difference; 3) number of goals scored.
(C) Champions; (R) Relegated

==== 1. divisjon ====
Pos	Team	Pld	W	D	L	GF	GA	GD	Pts	Promotion or relegation
1	Sandviken (P)	18	15	2	1	73	16	+57	47	Promoted
2	Medkila (P)	18	13	3	2	57	27	+30	42	Promoted
3	Amazon Grimstad	18	11	2	5	49	29	+20	35	
4	Skeid	18	11	1	6	50	26	+24	34	
5	Byåsen	18	9	1	8	43	52	−9	28	
6	Fortuna	18	7	4	7	32	29	+3	25	
7	Kattem	18	5	3	10	27	40	−13	18	
8	Haugar	18	4	1	13	18	52	−34	13	
9	Vålerenga (R)	18	3	1	14	20	61	−41	10	Relegated
10	Nittedal (R)	18	2	2	14	14	51	−37	8	Relegated

(P) Promoted; (R) Relegated

=== Norwegian Women's Cup ===
==== Final ====
- Medkila 2–1 Kolotn

== Men's UEFA competitions ==
=== Norwegian representatives ===
- Rosenborg (UEFA Champions League)
- Vålerenga (UEFA Cup, cup winner)
- Molde (UEFA Cup)
- Lyn (UEFA Cup)

=== Champions League ===
==== Qualifying rounds ====
===== Second qualifying round =====
Team 1	Agg.	Team 2	1st leg	2nd leg
Bohemians (Republic of Ireland)	0–5	(Norway) Rosenborg	0–1	0–4

===== Third qualifying round =====
Team 1	Agg.	Team 2	1st leg	2nd leg
Rosenborg (Norway)	0–1	(Spain) Deportivo La Coruña	0–0	0–1

=== UEFA Cup ===
==== Qualifying round ====
Team 1	Agg.	Team 2	1st leg	2nd leg
Molde (Norway)	6–0	(Faroe Islands) KÍ Klaksvík	2–0	4–0
NSÍ Runavík (Faroe Islands)	1–9	(Norway) Lyn Oslo	1–3	0–6

==== First round ====
Team 1	Agg.	Team 2	1st leg	2nd leg
Vålerenga (Norway)	1–1 (a)	(Austria) GAK	0–0	1–1
União de Leiria (Portugal)	2–3	(Norway) Molde	1–0	1–3
Ventspils (Latvia)	1–10	(Norway) Rosenborg	1–4	0–6
PAOK (Greece)	3–1	(Norway) Lyn Oslo	0–1	3–0

==== Second round ====
Team 1	Agg.	Team 2	1st leg	2nd leg
Rosenborg (Norway)	1–0	(Serbia and Montenegro) Red Star Belgrade	0–0	1–0
Benfica (Portugal)	5–1	(Norway) Molde	3–1	2–0
Vålerenga (Norway)	0–0 (4–3 p)	(Poland) Wisła Kraków	0–0	0–0 (a.e.t.)

==== Third round ====
Team 1	Agg.	Team 2	1st leg	2nd leg
Benfica (Portugal)	2–2 (a)	(Norway) Rosenborg	1–0	1–2
Vålerenga (Norway)	2–4	(England) Newcastle United	1–1	1–3

=== Intertoto Cup ===
No Norwegian representative this season.

== UEFA Women's Cup ==
=== Norwegian representatives ===
- Kolbotn

=== Second qualifying round ===
==== Group 6 ====
Pos	Team	Pld	W	D	L	GF	GA	GD	Pts	Qualification	KOL	JUV	WRO	UCD
1	(Norway) Kolbotn (H)	3	3	0	0	25	3	+22	9	Advance to quarter-finals	—	–	15–2	8–0
2	(France) Juvisy	3	2	0	1	10	3	+7	6		1–2	—	–	6–1
3	(Poland) AZS Wrocław	3	1	0	2	5	18	−13	3		–	0–3	—	–
4	(Republic of Ireland) University College Dublin	3	0	0	3	1	17	−16	0		–	–	0–3	—

Source: RSSSF
(H) Hosts

Matches (in Kolbotn)

August 21	Kolbotn	15–2	Wroclaw (Poland)

August 23	Kolbotn	8–0	UCD (Ireland)

August 25	Kolbotn	2–1	Juvisy (France)

=== Quarter-finals ===
Team 1	Agg.	Team 2	1st leg	2nd leg
Malmö FF Dam (Sweden)	2–1	(Norway) Kolbotn	2–0	0–1

== National teams ==
=== Norway men's national football team ===
==== Friendlies ====
26 January 2003 Friendly	United Arab Emirates	1–1	Norway	Sharjah Stadium, Abu Dhabi
	Srour 63'		Helstad 72'	Attendance: 800; Referee: Mohamed Omar (United Arab Emirates)

28 January 2003 Friendly	Oman	1–2	Norway	Police Stadium, Muscat
	Shaaban 50'		Karadaş 63'; Rushfeldt 82'	Attendance: 500; Referee: Al-Ajmi (Oman)
Note: Oman fielded its U23-team (Olympic Team)

12 February 2003 Friendly	Greece	1–0	Norway	Theodoros Vardinogiannis Stadium, Heraklion
	Kyrgiakos 25'			Attendance: 8.000; Referee: Gomes Costa (Portugal)

30 April 2003 Friendly	Republic of Ireland	1–0	Norway	Lansdowne Road, Dublin
	Duff 17'			Attendance: 32.643; Referee: McCurry (Scotland)

22 May 2003 Friendly	Norway	2–0	Finland	Ullevaal Stadion, Oslo
	Leonhardsen 22'; T.A. Flo 80'			Attendance: 13.436; Referee: Clark (Scotland)

20 August 2003 Friendly	Norway	0–0	Scotland	Ullevaal Stadion, Oslo
				Attendance: 12.758; Referee: Vuorela (Finland)

10 September 2003 Friendly	Norway	0–1	Portugal	Ullevaal Stadion, Oslo
			Pauleta 9'	Attendance: 11.014; Referee: Bennett (England)

==== UEFA Euro 2004 qualifying ====
===== Group 2 =====
Pos	Team	Pld	W	D	L	GF	GA	GD	Pts	Qualification	(Denmark)	(Norway)	(Romania)	(Bosnia and Herzegovina)	(Luxembourg)
1	Denmark	8	4	3	1	15	9	+6	15	Qualify for final tournament	—	1–0	2–2	0–2	2–0
2	Norway	8	4	2	2	9	5	+4	14 (Note: Head-to-head points: Norway 4, Romania 1.)	Advance to play-offs	2–2	—	1–1	2–0	1–0
3	Romania	8	4	2	2	21	9	+12	14		2–5	0–1	—	2–0	4–0
4	Bosnia and Herzegovina	8	4	1	3	7	8	−1	13		1–1	1–0	0–3	—	2–0
5	Luxembourg	8	0	0	8	0	21	−21	0		0–2	0–2	0–7	0–1	—

Source: UEFA
Notes:

Matches

2 April 2003 UEFA Euro 2004 qualifying	Luxembourg	0–2	Norway	Stade Josy Barthel, Luxembourg
			Rushfeldt 58'; Solskjær 73'	Attendance: 3.000; Referee: Dobrinov (Bulgaria)

7 June 2003 UEFA Euro 2004 qualifying	Denmark	1–0	Norway	Parken, Copenhagen
	Grønkjær 5'			Attendance: 41.824; Referee: Poll (England)

11 June 2003 UEFA Euro 2004 qualifying	Norway	1–1	Romania	Ullevaal Stadion, Oslo
	Solskjær 78' (pen)		Ganea 64'	Attendance: 24.890; Referee: Michel (Slovakia)

6 September 2003 UEFA Euro 2004 qualifying	Bosnia and Herzegovina	1–0	Norway	Bilino Polje, Zenica
	Bajramovic 86'			Attendance: 18.000; Referee: Bre (France)

11 October 2003 UEFA Euro 2004 qualifying	Norway	1–0	Luxembourg	Ullevaal Stadion, Oslo
	T.A. Flo 19'			Attendance: 22.255; Referee: Szabo (Hungary)

==== UEFA Euro 2004 qualifying play-offs ====
15 November 2003 UEFA Euro 2004 qualifying play-offs	Spain	2–1	Norway	Estadio Mestalla, Valencia
	Raúl 21'; H. Berg 85' (own goal)	Report	Iversen 15'	Attendance: 53.000; Referee: Poll (England)

19 November 2003 UEFA Euro 2004 qualifying play-offs	Norway	0–3 (1–5 agg.)	Spain	Ullevaal Stadion, Oslo
		Report	Raúl 34'; Vicente 49'; Etxeberria 57'	Attendance: 25.100; Referee: Collina (Italy)

=== Norway women's national football team ===
January 23: Norway – United States 1–3, friendly

January 26: Norway – Germany 2–2, friendly

January 29: China – Norway 1–1, friendly

February 17: Norway – Denmark 3–3, friendly

February 20: Norway – Denmark 4–0, friendly

March 14: Sweden – Norway 1–1, friendly

March 16: Norway – United States 0–1, friendly

March 18: Norway – Canada 1–0, friendly

March 20: Norway – France 1–0, friendly

May 11: Norway – Belgium 6–0, European Championship qualifier

May 15: Norway – Netherlands 2–0, European Championship qualifier

August 2: Norway – Nigeria 3–2, friendly

September 11: Norway – Denmark 1–1, European Championship qualifier

September 20: Norway – France 2–0, World Cup 1st round

September 24: Norway – Brazil 1–4, World Cup 1st round

September 27: South Korea – Norway 1–7, World Cup 1st round

October 1: United States – Norway 1–0, World Cup quarterfinal

November 1: Spain – Norway 0–2, European Championship qualifier
