= Johanna Nyman =

Swedish footballer

Personal information
- Full name: Johanna Nyman
- Date of birth: 30 April 1995 (age 31)
- Place of birth: Sweden
- Position: Defender

Senior career*
Years	Team	Apps	(Gls)
2011–2021	Umeå IK	82	(2)

International career
2013	Sweden U19	1	(0)
- * Club domestic league appearances and goals

Johanna Nyman (born 30 April 1995) is a retired Swedish footballer who last played for Umeå IK.
