= Kristine Lindblom =

Norwegian footballer (born 1982)

Personal information
- Full name: Kristine Gangsø Lindblom
- Date of birth: 10 November 1982 (age 43)
- Position: Midfielder

Youth career
- Kolbotn

Senior career*
Years	Team	Apps	(Gls)
2000–2009	Kolbotn		
2010–2012	Jitex		

International career^{‡}
2001	Norway u-18	7	(0)
2002–2006	Norway u-21	19	(4)
2003–2008	Norway	4	(0)
- * Club domestic league appearances and goals as of 6 November 2019 ‡ National team caps and goals as of 6 November 2019

Kristine Lindblom (born 10 November 1982) is a retired Norwegian football midfielder.

She started her youth career in Kolbotn IL, playin on the same girls' team as Solveig Gulbrandsen and Kristin Blystad Bjerke. She spent her senior career in Kolbotn as well, before venturing into Damallsvenskan with Jitex BK.

She made her debut for the Norway women's national football team in China in 2003, played twice in the 2004 Algarve Cup and won her last cap in 2008.
