= Moira Placchi =

Italian footballer

Personal information
- Full name: Moira Placchi
- Date of birth: 14 March 1970 (age 56)
- Place of birth: Italy
- Position: Defender

Senior career*
Years	Team	Apps	(Gls)
- Bardolino
- Porto Montovano
2008–2009	Frutta Verona		

International career
- Italy
- * Club domestic league appearances and goals

Moira Placchi is an Italian retired football defender who played for CF Bardolino and ACF Porto Mantovano in Serie A.

She was a member of the Italian national team in the qualifying stages for the 2003 World Cup and the 2005 European Championship. Placchi scored the winner against Yugoslavia that qualified Italy for the latter's repechage play-offs, but she was not called up for the finals.
