= Jeanet van der Laan =

Dutch footballer and politician

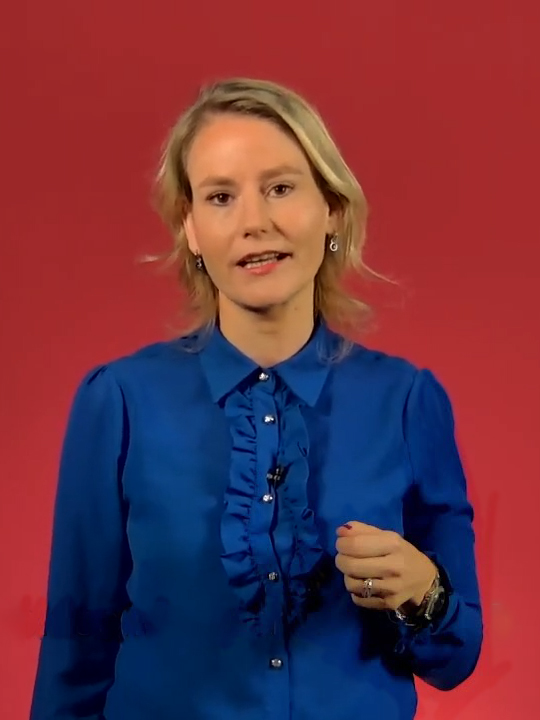
- Van der Laan in 2021

Member of the House of Representatives
- In office 31 March 2021 – 5 December 2023

Alderwoman of Lisse
- In office 14 May 2018 – 31 March 2021
- Succeeded by: Jeffrey van Haaster

Member of the Municipal Council of Lisse
- In office 27 March 2014 – 14 May 2018
- Succeeded by: Erik Prins
- In office 11 March 2010 – 12 September 2013
- Succeeded by: Michael van der Laan

Personal details
- Born: Jeanet Maria Petronella van der Laan; 20 January 1980 (age 46) Lisse, Netherlands
- Party: Democrats 66 (since 2013)
- Other political affiliations: Nieuw Lisse (2010–2013)
- Spouse: Kevin Winter (m. 2015)
- Education: Educatieve Faculteit Amsterdam; Leiden University
- Occupation: Teacher, politician
Association football career
- Positions: Right-back; left-back
Youth career
- FC Lisse
Senior career*
Years	Team	Apps	(Gls)
1997–2007	Ter Leede		
International career
1996–2003	Netherlands	29	(0)
Medal record
Universiade
Silver medal – second place	2001 Beijing	Team
- * Club domestic league appearances and goals

Jeanet Maria Petronella van der Laan (pronounced [ʑɑˈnɛt fɑn dər ˈlaːn]; born 20 January 1980) is a Dutch retired footballer, teacher, and politician of the social liberal party Democrats 66 (D66).

A defender of FC Lisse, she became the first girl to be allowed to play in a national boys' competition in 1995. She later played for Ter Leede, winning the women's national championship multiple times, and she appeared in 29 international matches as part of the women's national football team. Van der Laan also worked as a teacher, and she retired from football in 2007.

She was elected to the Lisse municipal council in 2010 and continued serving there with a half-year hiatus until she became an alderwoman in 2018. Van der Laan was elected to the House of Representatives in the 2021 general election.

== Early life and education ==
Van der Laan was born and raised in Lisse, South Holland. She has an older brother and a younger sister, and her parents worked at a dahlia nursery. In 1998, after having completed her secondary education, Van der Laan started studying Dutch at the Educatieve Faculteit Amsterdam, a cooperation between the Amsterdam and Holland Universities of Applied Sciences to train teachers.

She also studied public administration at Leiden University starting in 2007 and earned a master's degree.

== Association football ==
Van der Laan began playing football at the age of six. In June 1995, she became the first girl to be allowed to play in a national boys' competition of the Royal Dutch Football Association (KNVB). FC Lisse's male B1 team, to which Van der Laan belonged, had won a regional league and had been promoted to the national third division. The KNVB granted the permission to Van der Laan due to her role in the promotion and due to her performance in the women's national youth team.

She subsequently played as part of the A2 boys' squad and left FC Lisse in 1997 to join the Sassenheim club Ter Leede. There, she was part of the women's squad, which won the national championship for women several times. Van der Laan had also joined the women's national football team as a right-back, debuting in an August 2001 match against Germany. As part of the Dutch team, she won the silver medal in women's football at the 2001 Summer Universiade in Beijing. She played in a total of 29 international matches until she left the team in 2003 because of her non-football career. Van der Laan stopped playing football at Ter Leede in 2007, when the Vrouwen Eredivisie was introduced.

In the early 2000s, she worked for a few years for WK Producties, which was responsible for football broadcasts on the TV channel SBS6. Van der Laan became a KNVB ambassador in 2016, and she joined the NPO Radio 1 show Langs de Lijn, providing analysis of matches of the 2017 UEFA European Women's Championship and the 2019 FIFA Women's World Cup including the final of the 2017 championship. In 2020, she became chair of SC Telstar's advisory board, which was established to get their women's team into the Eredivisie.

== Teaching career and politics ==
Van der Laan started teaching Dutch at the Lisse secondary school Fioretti College in the early 2000s and also became team leader of its first year in 2005. While still working there, she was elected into the municipal council of Lisse in the 2010 municipal election as a member of the local political party Nieuw Lisse. She left the council in September 2013 in order to join D66 and was succeeded by her brother Michael. Van der Laan was D66's third candidate in Lisse in the 2014 municipal election, and she became the party's caucus leader in the council after the election.

She was appointed chair of D66's new national thematic department Sport and Exercise in early 2016. Van der Laan had lobbied for its establishment in order to make sport policy more prominent within the party. She was D66's 32nd candidate in the 2017 general election, receiving 1,588 preference votes, but was not elected due to her party winning nineteen seats. Van der Laan was re-elected to Lisse's council in 2018, being D66's lead candidate. She left both the council and the Fioretti College in May 2018 to serve as alderwoman in the new municipal executive. Her portfolio included spatial planning, sustainability, education, culture, youth, and sport affairs.

=== House of Representatives ===
Van der Laan ran for member of parliament again in the 2021 general election, being placed thirteenth on D66's party list. During the campaign, she said that politics should pay more attention to sports, calling it neglected and important for fighting obesity. Van der Laan was elected into the House of Representatives with 10,489 preference votes, and she was installed on 31 March. Her specialities within D66 were higher education, science, emancipation, sports, health care prevention, and long-term care, and she is on the Committees for Education, Culture and Science; for Health, Welfare and Sport; for Justice and Security; and for Social Affairs and Employment. She is also a member of the Dutch parliamentary delegation to the Council of Europe.

A few months after her election, Van der Laan started writing a bill to ban conversion therapy together with politicians from other parties. This followed inaction by the cabinet on the issue after a House majority had indicated the desire for such a ban. The Council of State advised against the law in early 2023, saying that its added value had to be elaborated on. The governmental body stated that discrimination and coercion were already forbidden, while a total ban would be in conflict with the freedom of religion. Van der Laan also successfully called for an investigation into abuse in competitive dancing following news reports, and she introduced a motion to explicitly prohibit match fixing, which passed the House.

She was D66's lijstduwer in Lisse in the 2022 municipal elections.

== Personal life ==
Van der Laan resides in Lisse and has also lived in the nearby town of Noordwijk. She has been married to Kevin Winter, a retired amateur football player for FC Lisse, IJsselmeervogels, and Rijnsburgse Boys, since 2015. They have three sons, two of which are twins.

== Electoral history ==
Electoral history of Jeanet van der Laan
Year	Body	Party	Pos.	Votes	Result		Ref.
Year	Body	Party	Pos.	Votes	Party seats	Individual	Ref.
2021	House of Representatives	Democrats 66	13	10,489	24	Won	
