= 2003–04 UEFA Women's Cup =

Tournament details
- Teams: 41 (40 associations)

Final positions
- Champions: (Sweden) Umeå IK (2nd title)
- Runners-up: (Germany) Frankfurt

Tournament statistics
- Top scorer(s): (Austria) Maria Gstöttner; 11 goals

The UEFA Women's Cup 2003–04 was the third edition of the UEFA Women's Cup. It was convincingly won by reigning champions Umeå IK of Sweden in a two-legged final against Frankfurt of Germany. Both sides were aiming for their second win in the tournament.

== Teams ==
Second qualifying round
(Sweden) Umeå (TH, CH)	(Germany) Frankfurt (CH)	(England) Fulham (CH)	(Sweden) Malmö FF (RU)
(Denmark) Brøndby (CH)	(Norway) Kolbotn (CH)	(Italy) Foroni Verona (CH)	(Serbia and Montenegro) Mašinac Classic Niš (CH)
(Azerbaijan) Gömrükçü Baku (CH)	(Czech Republic) Slavia Prague (CH)	(Spain) Athletic Club Neskak (CH)	(Iceland) KR (CH)
(Russia) Energy Voronezh (CH)	(France) Juvisy (CH)	(Belarus) Bobruichanka Bobruisk (CH)	(Switzerland) Schwerzenbach (CH)
(Netherlands) Ter Leede (CH)	(Hungary) Femina (CH)	(Poland) AZS Wrocław (CH)	(Portugal) 1° Dezembro (CH)
(Ukraine) Lehenda-Cheksil (CH)	(Scotland) Kilmarnock (CH)	(Greece) Aegina (CH)	(Romania) CFF Clujana (CH)
(Finland) United (CH)	(Moldova) Codru Anenii Noi (CH)	(Faroe Islands) KÍ Klaksvík (CH)	(Republic of Ireland) University College Dublin (CW)
(Northern Ireland) Newtownabbey Strikers (CH)
First qualifying round
(Belgium) Lebeke-Aalst (CH)	(Austria) Neulengbach (CH)	(Kazakhstan) Temir Zholy (CH)	(Israel) Maccabi Holon (CH)
(Bosnia and Herzegovina) ZNK-SFK 2000 (CH)	(Wales) Cardiff City (CW)	(Slovenia) KRKA Novo Mesto (CH)	(Slovakia) Žiar nad Hronom (CH)
(North Macedonia) Lombardini Skopje (CH)	(Croatia) Osijek (CH)	(Estonia) Visa Tallinn (CH)	(Cyprus) PAOK Ledra (CH)

== Qualifying round ==
=== First qualifying round ===
==== Group A1 ====
Pos	Team	Pld	W	D	L	GF	GA	GD	Pts	Qualification	MHO	KRK	VTA	LA
1	(Israel) Maccabi Holon	2	2	0	0	7	3	+4	6	Advance to second qualifying round	—	4–2	–	w/o
2	(Slovenia) Krka Novo Mesto (H)	2	1	0	1	3	4	−1	3		–	—	1–0	w/o
3	(Estonia) Visa Tallinn	2	0	0	2	1	4	−3	0		1–3	–	—	w/o
4	(Belgium) Lebeke-Aalst (W)	0	0	0	0	0	0	0	0		–	–	–	—

Source: RSSSF
(H) Hosts; (W) Withdrew

==== Group A2 ====
Pos	Team	Pld	W	D	L	GF	GA	GD	Pts	Qualification	NEU	ŽNH	LSK	PLE
1	(Austria) Neulengbach	3	3	0	0	27	3	+24	9	Advance to second qualifying round	—	6–3	–	14–0
2	(Slovakia) Žiar nad Hronom	3	2	0	1	30	7	+23	6		–	—	–	15–0
3	(North Macedonia) Lombardini Skopje (H)	3	1	0	2	6	19	−13	3		0–7	1–12	—	5–0
4	(Cyprus) PAOK Ledra	3	0	0	3	0	34	−34	0		–	–	–	—

Source: RSSSF
(H) Hosts

==== Group A3 ====
Pos	Team	Pld	W	D	L	GF	GA	GD	Pts	Qualification	OSI	TZH	SAR	CAR
1	(Croatia) Osijek (H)	3	2	0	1	7	5	+2	6	Advance to second qualifying round	—	2–1	3–0	2–4
2	(Kazakhstan) Temir Zholy	3	2	0	1	5	4	+1	6		–	—	–	–
3	(Bosnia and Herzegovina) SFK Sarajevo	3	1	0	2	4	7	−3	3		–	2–3	—	–
4	(Wales) Cardiff City	3	1	0	2	5	5	0	3		–	0–1	1–2	—

Source: RSSSF
(H) Hosts

=== Second qualifying round ===
==== Group B1 ====
Pos	Team	Pld	W	D	L	GF	GA	GD	Pts	Qualification	BRØ	MCN	KR	KIL
1	(Denmark) Brøndby (H)	3	3	0	0	7	0	+7	9	Advance to quarter-finals	—	4–0	1–0	2–0
2	(Serbia and Montenegro) Masinac Classic Niš	3	1	1	1	4	6	−2	4		–	—	3–1	1–1
3	(Iceland) KR	3	1	0	2	6	5	+1	3		–	–	—	–
4	(Scotland) Kilmarnock	3	0	1	2	2	8	−6	1		–	–	1–5	—

Source: RSSSF
(H) Hosts

==== Group B2 ====
Pos	Team	Pld	W	D	L	GF	GA	GD	Pts	Qualification	GBA	AEG	BOB	SCH
1	(Azerbaijan) Gömrükçü Baku	3	2	0	1	8	2	+6	6	Advance to quarter-finals	—	3–0	0–1	–
2	(Greece) Aegina	3	1	1	1	7	9	−2	4		–	—	–	4–4
3	(Belarus) Bobruichanka Bobruisk (H)	3	1	1	1	4	4	0	4		–	2–3	—	1–1
4	(Switzerland) Schwerzenbach	3	0	2	1	6	10	−4	2		1–5	–	–	—

Source: RSSSF
(H) Hosts

==== Group B3 ====
Pos	Team	Pld	W	D	L	GF	GA	GD	Pts	Qualification	UME	SPR	CLU	NEW
1	(Sweden) Umeå (H)	3	3	0	0	23	1	+22	9	Advance to quarter-finals	—	–	6–0	15–0
2	(Czech Republic) Slavia Praha	3	2	0	1	6	2	+4	6		1–2	—	2–0	–
3	(Romania) Clujana Cluj-Napoca	3	0	1	2	1	9	−8	1		–	–	—	1–1
4	(Northern Ireland) Newtownabbey Strikers	3	0	1	2	1	19	−18	1		–	0–3	–	—

Source: RSSSF
(H) Hosts

==== Group B4 ====
Pos	Team	Pld	W	D	L	GF	GA	GD	Pts	Qualification	EVO	FVE	FEM	OSI
1	(Russia) Energy Voronezh (H)	3	2	1	0	24	0	+24	7	Advance to quarter-finals	—	6–0	2–0	–
2	(Italy) Foroni Verona	3	2	1	0	14	0	+14	7		–	—	1–2	15–0
3	(Hungary) Femina	3	1	0	2	3	15	−12	3		–	–	—	0–3
4	(Croatia) Osijek	3	0	0	3	0	26	−26	0		1–1	–	–	—

Source: RSSSF
(H) Hosts

==== Group B5 ====
Pos	Team	Pld	W	D	L	GF	GA	GD	Pts	Qualification	MFD	LCH	UNI	MHO
1	(Sweden) Malmö FF	3	3	0	0	12	1	+11	9	Advance to quarter-finals	—	–	3–0	–
2	(Ukraine) Lehenda-Cheksil (H)	3	2	0	1	6	3	+3	6		0–3	—	–	4–0
3	(Finland) United	3	1	0	2	3	6	−3	3		–	0–2	—	3–1
4	(Israel) Maccabi Holon	3	0	0	3	2	13	−11	0		1–6	–	–	—

Source: RSSSF
(H) Hosts

==== Group B6 ====
Pos	Team	Pld	W	D	L	GF	GA	GD	Pts	Qualification	KOL	JUV	WRO	UCD
1	(Norway) Kolbotn (H)	3	3	0	0	25	3	+22	9	Advance to quarter-finals	—	–	15–2	8–0
2	(France) Juvisy	3	2	0	1	10	3	+7	6		1–2	—	–	6–1
3	(Poland) AZS Wrocław	3	1	0	2	5	18	−13	3		–	0–3	—	–
4	(Republic of Ireland) University College Dublin	3	0	0	3	1	17	−16	0		–	–	0–3	—

Source: RSSSF
(H) Hosts

==== Group B7 ====
Pos	Team	Pld	W	D	L	GF	GA	GD	Pts	Qualification	FRA	NES	NEU	DEZ
1	(Germany) Frankfurt	3	3	0	0	19	2	+17	9	Advance to quarter-finals	—	–	7–1	4–0
2	(Spain) Athletic Club Neskak (H)	3	2	0	1	8	10	−2	6		1–8	—	2–0	–
3	(Austria) Neulengbach	3	1	0	2	2	9	−7	3		–	–	—	1–0
4	(Portugal) 1.º de Dezembro	3	0	0	3	2	10	−8	0		–	2–5	–	—

Source: RSSSF
(H) Hosts

==== Group B8 ====
Pos	Team	Pld	W	D	L	GF	GA	GD	Pts	Qualification	FUL	TLE	CAN	KIK
1	(England) Fulham	3	3	0	0	20	2	+18	9	Advance to quarter-finals	—	–	9–1	8–0
2	(Netherlands) Ter Leede (H)	3	2	0	1	14	3	+11	6		1–3	—	8–0	5–0
3	(Moldova) Codru Anenii Noi	3	1	0	2	6	20	−14	3		–	–	—	5–3
4	(Faroe Islands) KÍ Klaksvík	3	0	0	3	3	18	−15	0		–	–	–	—

Source: RSSSF
(H) Hosts

== Knockout phase ==
=== Bracket ===
Quarter-finals
(Denmark) Brøndby	9	3	12
(Azerbaijan) Gömrükçü Baku	0	0	0
(Russia) Energy Voronezh	1	1	2
(Sweden) Umeå	2	2	4
(Sweden) Malmö	2	0	2
(Norway) Kolbotn	0	1	1
(Germany) Frankfurt	3	4	7
(England) Fulham	1	1	2

Semi-finals
(Denmark) Brøndby	2	0	2
(Sweden) Umeå	3	1	4
(Sweden) Malmö	0	1	1
(Germany) Frankfurt	0	4	4

Final
(Sweden) Umeå	3	5	8
(Germany) Frankfurt	0	0	0

=== Quarter-finals ===
Team 1	Agg.	Team 2	1st leg	2nd leg
Brøndby (Denmark)	12–0	(Azerbaijan) Gömrükçü Baku	9–0	3–0
Energy Voronezh (Russia)	2–4	(Sweden) Umeå	1–2	1–2
Malmö (Sweden)	2–1	(Norway) Kolbotn	2–0	0–1
Frankfurt (Germany)	7–2	(England) Fulham	3–1	4–1

=== Semi-finals ===
Team 1	Agg.	Team 2	1st leg	2nd leg
Brøndby (Denmark)	2–4	(Sweden) Umeå	2–3	0–1
Malmö (Sweden)	1–4	(Germany) Frankfurt	0–0	1–4

=== Final ===
Team 1	Agg.	Team 2	1st leg	2nd leg
Umeå (Sweden)	8–0	(Germany) Frankfurt	3–0	5–0

8 May 2004
15:00 UTC+2

Umeå (Sweden)	3–0	(Germany) Frankfurt
Marta 16', 58'; Östberg 49'	Report

Råsunda, Solna
Attendance: 5,409
Referee: Floarea Cristina Ionescu (Romania)
5 June 2004
14:30 UTC+2

Frankfurt (Germany)	0–5	(Sweden) Umeå
	Report	Marta 27'; Östberg 45+2'; Sjöström 49', 70'; Moström 68'

Stadion am Brentanobad, Frankfurt
Attendance: 9,500
Referee: Claudine Brohet (Belgium)

Umeå won 8–0 on aggregate.

UEFA Women's Cup
2003-04 winners

Second title

== Top goalscorers ==
Rank	Player	Team	Goals
1	(Italy) Chiara Gazzoli	Foroni Verona	10
2	(Finland) Heidi Kackur	Malmö FF Dam	9
3	(Ukraine) Natalia Zinchenko	Energy Voronezh	8
4	(Germany) Renate Lingor	Frankfurt	7
5	(Norway) Solveig Gulbrandsen	Kolbotn	6
