= Jessica Julin =

Finnish footballer (born 1978)

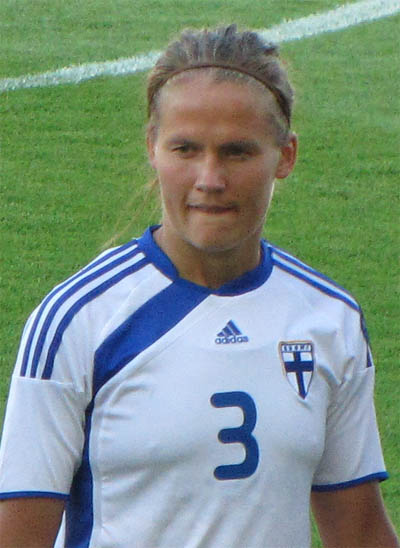

Personal information
- Full name: Jessica Carola Julin
- Date of birth: 6 December 1978 (age 47)
- Place of birth: Jakobstad, Finland
- Height: 1.75 m (5 ft 9 in)
- Positions: Defender; midfielder

Youth career
- Into
- FF Jaro

College career
Years	Team	Apps	(Gls)
2000–2002	South Carolina Gamecocks		

Senior career*
Years	Team	Apps	(Gls)
1994	GBK Kokkola		
1995–1997	FC United (Pietarsaari)		
1998–1999	Umeå IK		
2003–2005	Umeå IK		
2005–2006	Kopparbergs/Göteborg FC		
2007–2008	AIK		
2009–2010	Stattena IF	22	(1)
2014–2015	Hovås Billdal IF	49	(8)
2016–2017	Holmalunds IF	27	(5)

International career
1997–2009	Finland	118	(4)

Managerial career
- 2012–2013: IF Böljan
- 2014–2015: Hovås Billdal IF
- * Club domestic league appearances and goals

Jessica Carola Julin (born 6 December 1978) is a Finnish former footballer who played in either defence or midfield. She is a legend of Finnish football.

She spent several seasons in the Swedish Damallsvenskan representing Umeå IK, Kopparbergs/Göteborg FC, AIK and Stattena IF. After making her debut for the Finland women's national football team in 1997, Julin won 118 caps and participated at UEFA Women's Euro 2005 and UEFA Women's Euro 2009.

== Career ==
A Swedish–speaking Finn, Julin was born on Finland's Independence Day. She grew up in Jakobstad. After moving to Sweden and playing for Umeå IK in 1998 and 1999, Julin accepted a scholarship to University of South Carolina and played varsity soccer from 2000 to 2002. She then returned to Umeå but was Cup-tied for the 2003 UEFA Women's Cup Final because she had played for HJK in their 8–0 defeat to Frankfurt in the quarter-final. Julin featured in both legs of the following year's final and collected a winners' medal. On 27 June 2005, it was announced she was leaving Umeå IK.

In 2005, she moved on to Martin Pringle's Kopparbergs/Göteborg FC to ensure first team football ahead of the 2005 European Championships in England. Finland reached the semi-final with Julin starting all four matches. Julin wound down her career in Sweden with spells at AIK and Stattena.

== International career ==
Julin made her debut for the senior Finland women's national football team in March 1997; against Norway in the Algarve Cup.

Julin was called up to the UEFA Women's Euro 2005 squad.

Julin was called up to the UEFA Women's Euro 2009 squad. She also played in all four matches Finland hosted at UEFA Women's Euro 2009, including the quarter-final defeat by England. She retired from international football after the tournament.

== Managerial career ==
After the 2010 season Julin retired from playing to become the assistant manager of Jitex BK. She had to retire due to injuries. Julin took over as manager of IF Böljan for the 2012 season following two years at Jitex.

In 2014 Julin moved to coach Hovås Billdal IF and also made a playing comeback with the Elitettan club. After leading the club to a best ever fifth-place finish in the 2015 season, she resigned her position.
