= Gammliavallen =

Sports ground in Umeå, Sweden

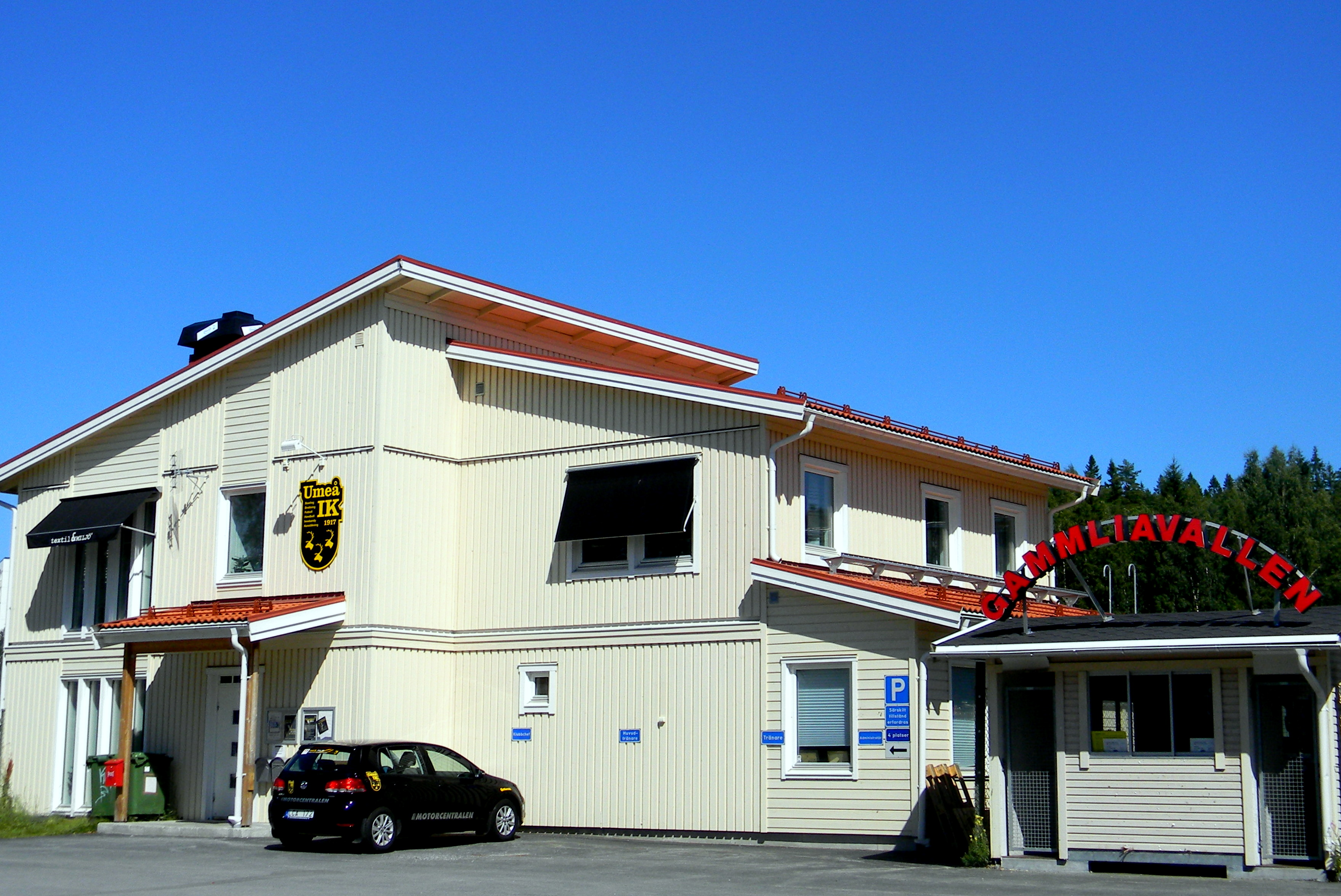
- Interactive map of Gammliavallen
- Location: Umeå, Sweden
- Coordinates: 63°49′48″N 20°17′9″E
- Owner: Umeå Municipality
- Capacity: about 10,000
- Surface: Artificial turf
- Field size: 105 x 65 meters

Construction
- Opened: 7 June 1925; 101 years ago

Gammliavallen is a multi-purpose stadium in Umeå, Sweden. It is currently used mostly for football matches and is the home stadium of Umeå IK, Umeå FC and Team TG FF. The stadium holds 10,000 people. The sports complex also contains indoor sports halls and conference facilities.

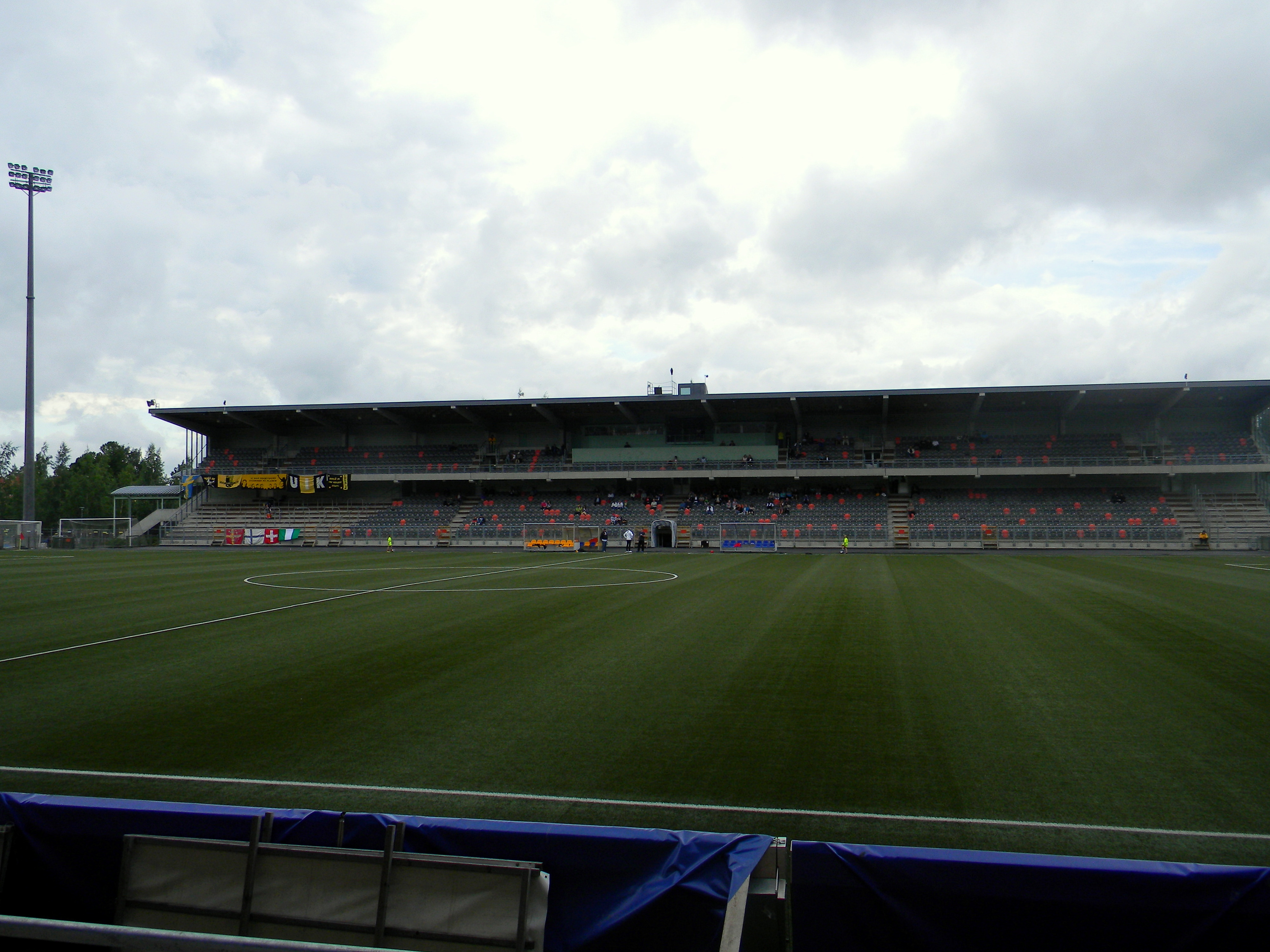
Gammliavallen field
