= Tsentralnyi Profsoyuz Stadion (Voronezh) =

Football stadium in Voronezh, Russia

Trade Unions Central Stadium
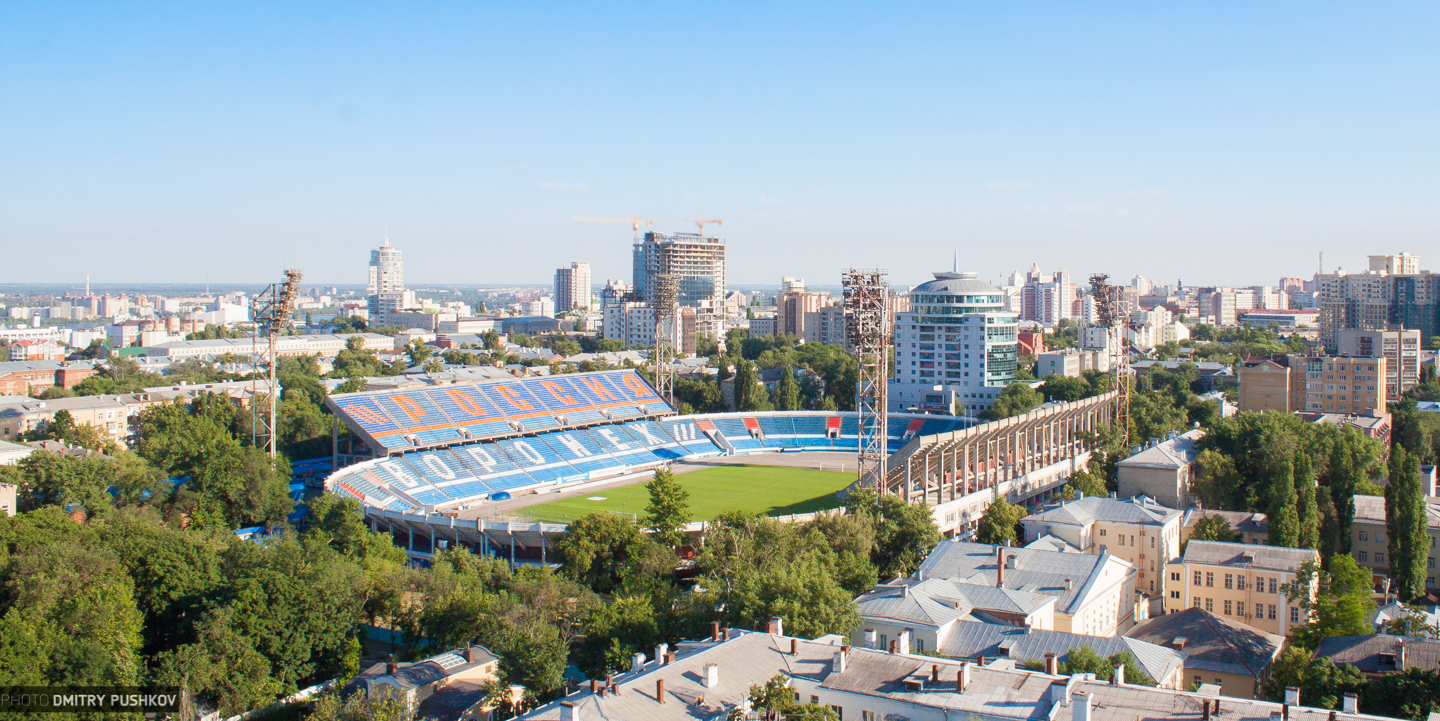
- Interactive map of Trade Unions Central Stadium
- Location: Voronezh, Russia
- Coordinates: 51°40′22″N 39°12′15″E
- Capacity: 31,793
- Surface: Grass

Construction
- Groundbreaking: 1927
- Opened: 1930
- Closed: 2024
- Demolished: 2025–2026

Tenant
- Fakel Voronezh (1953–2024)

The Trade Unions Central Stadium is a multi-use stadium in Voronezh, Russia. It is currently used mostly for football matches by Russian First League side Fakel Voronezh. The stadium holds 31,793 people.

On November 17, 2010 the stadium was used for a friendly soccer match between the national soccer teams of Russia and Belgium, in which the Russian team lost against Belgium by 0–2. Both goals were scored by Romelu Lukaku (at that time it were his only goals for the national team).

The stadium was closed in 2024, with Fakel Voronezh moving to a newly built Fakel Stadium which would serve as a temporary base. Demolition began in December 2025. Construction of a new arena at the same place is expected to start in 2026 and last until 2029.
