= Ditte Larsen =

Danish footballer (born 1983)

Personal information
- Full name: Ditte Lockenwitz Larsen
- Date of birth: 24 April 1983 (age 43)
- Place of birth: Denmark
- Position: Midfielder

Team information
- Current team: Brøndby
- Number: 19

Youth career
- Fladså
- Præstø

Senior career*
Years	Team	Apps	(Gls)
–2000	Bårse IF		
2001–2002	B1921		
2003–2004	Brøndby		
2005–2007	Asker		
2008–	Brøndby		

International career^{‡}
2002	Denmark U-19		
2004–	Denmark	8	(1)
- * Club domestic league appearances and goals ‡ National team caps and goals as of 13 December 2007

Ditte Larsen (born 24 April 1983) is a Danish football midfielder. She currently plays for Brøndby IF (women) and the Danish national team. From 2005 to 2007 she played in Norway for Asker FK.
