= Corinne Yorston =

English footballer

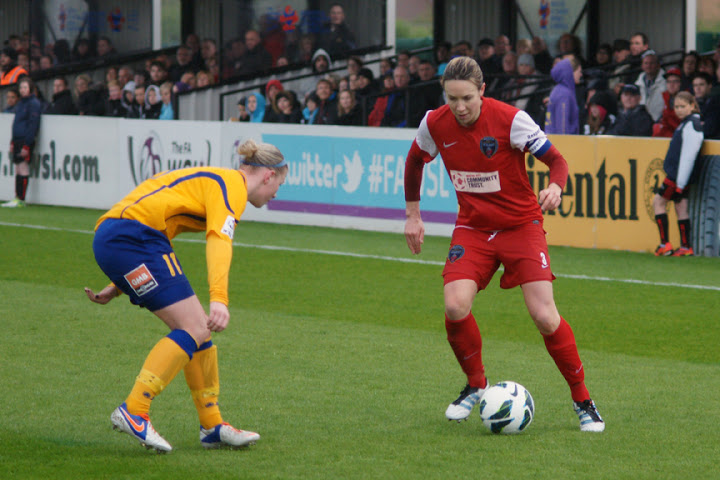

Personal information
- Full name: Corinne Louise Yorston
- Date of birth: 15 June 1983 (age 43)
- Place of birth: Fleet, Hampshire, England
- Position: Defender

Team information
- Current team: Keynsham Town

Youth career
- Beaulieu Belles

Senior career*
Years	Team	Apps	(Gls)
–2003	Southampton Saints		
2003–2005	Fulham		
2005–2009	Bristol Academy		
2009–2010	Arsenal	20	(2)
2010	→ Keynsham Town (on loan)		
2010–2014	Bristol Academy	53	(7)
2015	Yeovil Town	16	(8)
2016–2018	Bristol City		
2017	→ Oxford United (on loan)		
2018–	Keynsham Town	29	(8)

International career
2003–2009	England	6	(0)
- * Club domestic league appearances and goals

Corinne Louise Yorston (born 15 June 1983) is an English international footballer who plays as a defender for Keynsham Town. Although primarily a left-back, who won most of her England caps playing in central defence, she has also played as a midfielder at club level. She has also previously represented English Universities.

== Club career ==
Yorston began her career with Southampton Saints. She was inspired by Southampton coach Sue Lopez. In the 2003 close season, Yorston joined Fulham Ladies with whom she made her England debut in 2003. Soon after this she suffered a couple of stress fractures that kept her out of the game for nearly a year.

She joined Bristol Academy in the 2005 close season, and went on to have three seasons as club captain. She joined Arsenal Ladies in July 2009, but returned to Bristol in 2010. She was loaned out to Keynsham Town to maintain fitness ahead of Bristol's FA WSL season, which began in April 2011.

At the end of the 2014 season, Yorston left Bristol Academy to join FA WSL 2 side Yeovil Town.

== International career ==
Yorston won 19 caps at Under-19 level and also played at Under-23 level before joining the England senior team. She made her debut, as a substitute, in the game against Germany in September 2003 and played, again as a substitute, in the game against Denmark in February 2004. Her next game for England was not until March 2007 when she was a substitute for Rachel Unitt in the game against Scotland.

In May 2009, Yorston was one of the first 17 female players to be given central contracts by the Football Association.

She was allotted 151 when the FA announced their legacy numbers scheme to honour the 50th anniversary of England’s inaugural international.

== Personal life ==
Yorston has a degree in biochemistry and graduated with a Master's from the University of Bath, where she had been awarded a Talented Athlete Scholarship. After completing her Masters she began studying for an MPhil at the FA National Women's Player Development Centre at Loughborough University.

== Honours ==
=== Club ===
Arsenal

- FA Women's Premier League: 2010

=== Individual ===
- FAWSL Goal of the Month: April 2013
