= Tammy Waine =

English footballer

Youth career
- 1998-2001: Auburn Tigers

Senior career*
Years	Team	Apps	(Gls)
????-1998	Brighton and Hove Albion		
2003-2004	Fulham L.F.C.		
2004-????	Brighton and Hove Albion		
2015-2019	Chichester City		
2019-2021	Worthing FC		
2021-	Saltdean United FC		
- * Club domestic league appearances and goals

Tammy Waine is an English former footballer who played for Fulham L.F.C.

== College career ==
Waine played for the Auburn Tigers from 1998-2001, earning the record for most goals and points in a season in 2000.

== Club career ==
After graduating from college, Waine signed for Fulham at the start of the 2003-04 Women's Premier League season. She then returned to former club Brighton, where she had played before going to college.

In 2015, Waine joined Chichester City.

She signed with Worthing FC in August 2019 before moving to Saltdean United FC in 2021.
