= Heidi Kackur =

Finnish footballer (born 1978)

Personal information
- Full name: Heidi Kackur
- Date of birth: 31 October 1978 (age 47)
- Place of birth: Vörå, Finland
- Height: 1.63 m (5 ft 4 in)
- Position: Striker

Youth career
- Hellnäs BK
- Norrvalla FF

Senior career*
Years	Team	Apps	(Gls)
- FC United (Pietarsaari)
2003–2004	Malmö FF		
2005	Göteborg FC	20	(11)
2006–2007	Näsets SK		

International career
1999–2005	Finland	48	(12)
- * Club domestic league appearances and goals

Heidi Kackur (born 31 October 1978) is a Finnish former football striker. She played for Naisten Liiga club FC United Pietarsaari and Malmö FF and Göteborg FC of Sweden's Damallsvenskan.

Kackur married Henrik Wilson in June 2005 and in October 2005 retired from football to run a clothes shop. In April 2006 Kackur emerged from retirement to play for Swedish lower division club Näsets SK.

She was a member of the Finnish national team, making her debut in October 1999; a 3–1 defeat by Brazil in the 1999 Women's U.S. Cup. At the 2005 European Championship she scored a winner against Denmark that earned Finland's spot in the semi-finals.
