= Umeå IK =

Swedish women's association football club

- Full name: Umeå Idrottsklubb
- Short name: UIK
- Founded: 20 July 1917; 109 years ago
- Ground: Umeå Energi Arena
- Capacity: 14,000
- Chairman: Lena Sandlin
- Manager: Edvin Efranian
- League: Elitettan
- 2025: Elitettan, 5th
- Website: https://umeaik.se/
Home colours	Away colours

Umeå IK (Swedish pronunciation: [ˈʉ̌ːmɛɔ ˈîːkoː]) is a women's professional association football club based in the city of Umeå, in northern Sweden, and currently playing Elitettan, the second tier of women's football in Sweden.

They were one of the most successful football clubs in the world in the 2000s, winning seven Swedish championships between 2000 and 2008, four Swedish Cups (2001, 2002, 2003 and 2007) and the UEFA Women's Champions League twice, in 2003 and 2004. They also reached the Champions League finals in 2002, 2007 and 2008. A number of Swedish and international stars played for the club during that period, most notably Brazilian star Marta.

Umeå IK play their home games at Umeå Energi Arena (formerly known as Gammliavallen) in Umeå. The team colours are black and yellow. The club is affiliated to the Västerbottens Fotbollförbund.

== History ==
Established in 1917 as a general sports club, the women's football section began competing in 1985 in the Swedish fourth division. In 1986, they won the division and were promoted to the third division. In 1991, the club began paying its players, 35kr per game, and implemented a more regular training schedule than other Swedish teams in the hopes of turning the team into a European contender.

In 1996 the team reached the Premier Division (Damallsvenskan) only to be relegated the following year. In 1998 they were promoted again. The years following the second promotion saw an enormous success for the club, winning seven Swedish championships in 9 years (2000, 2001, 2002, 2005, 2006, 2007 and 2008). In the 2003 FIFA Women's World Cup, five out of the starting eleven on the silver medal-winning Swedish national team played for Umeå IK. In 2004, Brazilian star Marta signed with the club. The club went unbeaten in the 2006 Damallsvenskan season.

After their last championship title in 2008, the club's fortunes started to fade, with several high-profile players leaving or retiring soon after this time, and the club being forced to restructure itself to avoid bankruptcy in 2011. Despite a third place finish in 2011, this finish and the financial re-organisation was not enough to reverse the general downward direction of the club, and after a tumultuous 2016 season which included going a month without a head coach, the club finished eleventh out of twelve places in the league, and was relegated to the second division. They would spend the next three years in Elitettan before being promoted back to the top flight in 2019.

After finishing in eleventh in the 2020 Damallsvenskan season, the club was relegated again, only a year after their return to the top flight. A few days after the end of the season, head coach Robert Bergström announced his resignation after four years with the club.

During the upcoming season, the team played in Elitettan, and on 9 October 2021, Umeå IK defeated IF Brommapojkarna 6–2 on home soil and qualified for the 2022 Damallsvenskan. On 5 November 2022, Umeå IK was again relegated from Damallsvenskan. The club continued to compete in Elitettan in subsequent seasons, finishing third in the 2024 season and fifth in 2025.

== Honours ==
- Damallsvenskan
  - Champions (7): 2000, 2001, 2002, 2005, 2006, 2007, 2008
- Elitettan
  - Winners (2): 2019, 2021
- Svenska Cupen
  - Winners (4): 2001, 2002, 2003, 2007
- Svenska Supercupen
  - Winners (2): 2007, 2008
- UEFA Women's Champions League
  - Winners (2): 2003, 2004
  - Runners-up (3) 2002, 2007, 2008

== Current squad ==
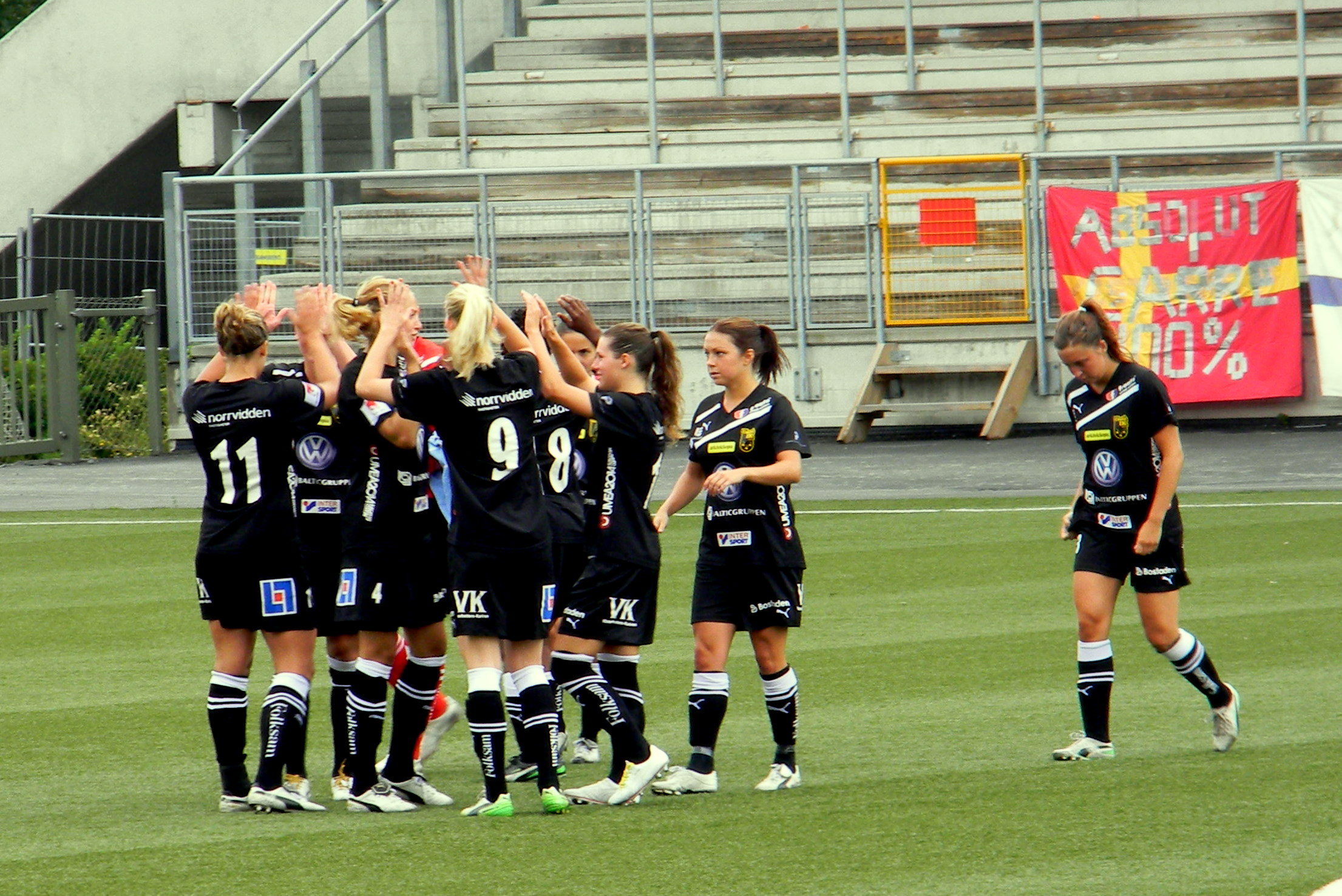
Before a match in July 2011

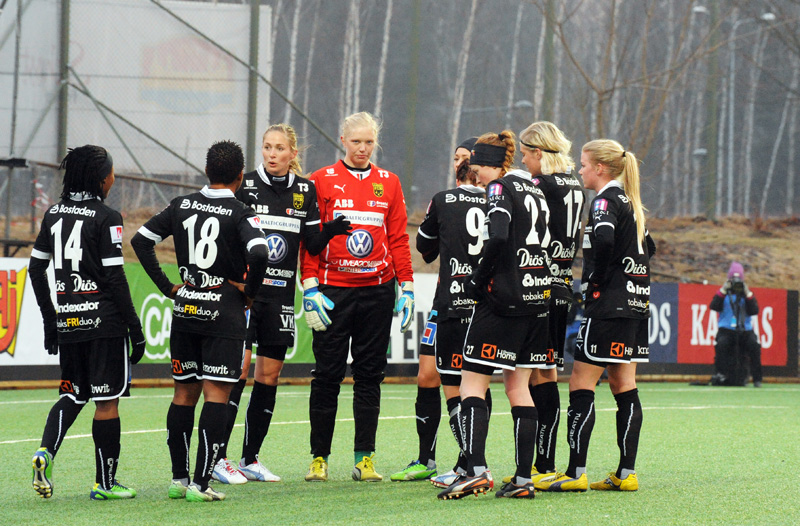
Before a match in April 2013

As of 10 May 2024.

Note: Flags indicate national team as defined under FIFA eligibility rules; some limited exceptions apply. Players may hold more than one non-FIFA nationality.

No.	Pos.	Nation	Player
1	GK	SWE	Tea Lundmark
2	MF	SWE	Tilda Sörlén
3	DF	SWE	Blossom Davis
4	DF	SWE	Emma Becker
5	DF	SWE	Julia Holmgren
6	MF	SWE	Tilde Eliasson Nordbotn
7	MF	FIN	Cecilia Ek
8	FW	SWE	Agnes Brännström
9	FW	SWE	Linnea Westbom
11	MF	SWE	Alma Nygren
13	MF	FIN	Anni Miettunen

No.	Pos.	Nation	Player
14	FW	SWE	Issy Goldmann
15	DF	FIN	Cassandra Larsson
16	MF	SWE	Thea Bäckström
18	DF	SWE	Meya Larsson
19	MF	SWE	Elvira Fjällström
20	MF	SWE	Stina Andersson
23	FW	SWE	Mimmi Persson
24	FW	SWE	Nicole Robertson
25	GK	GER	Maja Baun
29	MF	SWE	Inez Amcoff
30	GK	SWE	Izabelle Bardosen

=== Former players ===
For details of former players, see Category:Umeå IK players.

=== Retired numbers ===
6 (Sweden) Malin Moström, Midfielder (1995–2006, 2007)

== Record in UEFA competitions ==
All results (away, home and aggregate) list Umeå's goal tally first.

Competition	Round	Club	Away	Home	Aggregate
2001–2002	Second qualifying round	(Czech Republic) Sparta Prague	–	1–0	–
2001–2002	Second qualifying round	(Bulgaria) Varna	–	3–0	–
2001–2002	Second qualifying round	(Hungary) Femina Budapest	–	6–0	–
2001–2002	Quarter-final	(Russia) Ryazan	3–1	4–1 ^{a}	7–2
2001–2002	Semi-final	(Finland) HJK Helsinki	1–0	2–1 ^{a}	3–1
2001–2002	Final	(Germany) Frankfurt	0–2 ( (Germany) Frankfurt)		
2002–2003	Second qualifying round	(Faroe Islands) Klaksvík	–	7–0	–
2002–2003	Second qualifying round	(Estonia) Levadia Tallinn	–	4–0	–
2002–2003	Second qualifying round	(Czech Republic) Sparta Prague	–	6–1	–
2002–2003	Quarter-final	(France) Toulouse	0–0	2–0 ^{a}	2–0
2002–2003	Semi-final	(Germany) Frankfurt	1–1 a.e.t. (7p–6p)	1–1 ^{a}	2–2
2002–2003	Final	(Denmark) Fortuna Hjørring	3–0	4–1 ^{a}	7–1
2003–2004	Second qualifying round	(Northern Ireland) Crusaders Newtownabbey Strikers	–	15–0	–
2003–2004	Second qualifying round	(Romania) Clujana Cluj-Napoca	–	6–0	–
2003–2004	Second qualifying round	(Czech Republic) Slavia Prague	–	2–1	–
2003–2004	Quarter-final	(Russia) Energy Voronezh	2–1 ^{a}	2–1	4–2
2003–2004	Semi-final	(Denmark) Brøndby	3–2 ^{a}	1–0	4–2
2003–2004	Final	(Germany) Frankfurt	5–0	3–0 ^{a}	8–0
2004–2005	Second qualifying round	(Slovenia) Krka Novo Mesto	7–1	–	–
2004–2005	Second qualifying round	(Belarus) Bobruichanka Bobruisk	5–1	–	–
2004–2005	Second qualifying round	(Serbia) Mašinac Niš (Host)	8–0	–	–
2004–2005	Quarter-final	(Sweden) Djurgården Stockholm	1–2 ^{a}	0–1	1–3
2006–2007	Second qualifying round	(Ukraine) Legenda Chernihiv	2–0	–	–
2006–2007	Second qualifying round	(Spain) Espanyol Barcelona	3–0	–	–
2006–2007	Second qualifying round	(Norway) Kolbotn (Host)	2–1	–	–
2006–2007	Quarter-final	(Netherlands) Saestum Zeist	6–1 ^{a}	5–2	11–3
2006–2007	Semi-final	(Norway) Kolbotn	5–1 ^{a}	6–0	11–1
2006–2007	Final	(England) Arsenal	0–0	0–1 ^{a}	0–1
2007–2008	Second qualifying round	(Romania) Clujana Cluj-Napoca	–	3–1	–
2007–2008	Second qualifying round	(Belarus) Universitet Vitebsk	–	2–0	–
2007–2008	Second qualifying round	(Russia) Rossiyanka Khimki	–	2–2	–
2007–2008	Quarter-final	(Belgium) Rapide Wezemaal	4–0 ^{a}	6–0	10–0
2007–2008	Semi-final	(France) Olympique Lyon	1–1 ^{a}	0–0	1–1 (agr)
2007–2008	Final	(Germany) Frankfurt	2–3	1–1 ^{a}	3–4
2008–2009	Second qualifying round	(Iceland) Valur Reykjavík	–	5–1	–
2008–2009	Second qualifying round	(Kazakhstan) Alma Almaty	–	6–0	–
2008–2009	Second qualifying round	(Italy) Verona	–	4–0	–
2008–2009	Quarter-final	(England) Arsenal	2–3 ^{a}	6–0	8–3
2008–2009	Semi-final	(Russia) Zvezda Perm	0–2 ^{a}	2–2	2–4
2009–2010	Round of 32	(Ukraine) Zhytlobud-1 Kharkiv	5–0 ^{a}	6–0	11–0
2009–2010	Round of 16	(Russia) Rossiyanka Khimki	1–0 ^{a}	1–1	2–1
2009–2010	Quarter-Final	(France) Montpellier	2–2	0–0 ^{a}	2–2 (agr)
2009–2010	Semi-Final	(France) Lyon	2–3 ^{a}	0–0	2–3
2010–2011	Qualifying round	(Israel) Tel Aviv University	3–0	–	–
2010–2011	Qualifying round	(Cyprus) Apollon Limassol (Host)	1–4	–	–
2010–2011	Qualifying round	(Bosnia and Herzegovina) SFK Sarajevo	1–0	–	–

^{a} First leg.
