= List of Swedish women's football champions (players) =

Swedish women's football champions (Swedish: Svenska mästare i fotboll) is a title held by the winners of the highest Swedish football league played each year, Damallsvenskan.

Below is a list of the players awarded medals.

== Players ==
=== A ===
- Maja Åström – Djurgården/Älvsjö 2004

=== B ===
- Kristin Bengtsson – Djurgården/Älvsjö 2004
- Ulrika Björn – Djurgården/Älvsjö 2003
- Ingrid Bohlin – Djurgården/Älvsjö 2004
- Therese Brogårde – Djurgården/Älvsjö 2003, 2004
- Jill Buchwald – Djurgården/Älvsjö 2003, 2004

=== C ===
- Marijke Callebaut – Djurgården/Älvsjö 2004
- Josefine Christensen – Djurgården/Älvsjö 2003
- Jenny Curtsdotter – Djurgården/Älvsjö 2003, 2004

=== F ===
- Helen Fagerström – Djurgården/Älvsjö 2003, 2004
- Linda Fagerström – Djurgården/Älvsjö 2003, 2004
- Elin Flyborg – Djurgården/Älvsjö 2003

=== G ===
- Nadja Gyllander – Djurgården/Älvsjö 2003, 2004
- Anna Hall – Djurgården/Älvsjö 2004
- Venus James – Djurgården/Älvsjö 2004
- Sara Johansson – Djurgården/Älvsjö 2003, 2004
- Jennie Jonsson – Djurgården/Älvsjö 2003, 2004

=== K ===
- Tina Kindvall – Djurgården/Älvsjö 2003

=== L ===
- Jessica Landström – Djurgården/Älvsjö 2003, 2004

=== N ===
- Linda Nöjd – Djurgården/Älvsjö 2003
- Ann-Marie Norlin – Djurgården/Älvsjö 2003, 2004
- Malin Nykvist – Djurgården/Älvsjö 2003, 2004

=== S ===
- Annica Svensson – Djurgården/Älvsjö 2003, 2004
- Victoria Svensson – Djurgården/Älvsjö 2003, 2004

=== T ===
- Sara Thunebro – Djurgården/Älvsjö 2003, 2004
- Jane Törnqvist – Djurgården/Älvsjö 2003, 2004

=== W ===
- Katarina Wicksell – Djurgården/Älvsjö 2003, 2004

== See also ==
- List of Swedish women's football champions
- List of Swedish football champions (players)
- List of Swedish junior champions
