= 2005 UEFA Women's Cup final =

2005 UEFA Women's Cup Final
- Event: 2004–05 UEFA Women's Cup
Djurgården	Turbine Potsdam
(Sweden)	(Germany)
1	5

First leg
Djurgården	Turbine Potsdam
0	2
- Date: 15 May 2005
- Venue: Stockholm Olympic Stadium, Stockholm
- Referee: Anna De Toni
- Attendance: 1,382

Second leg
Turbine Potsdam	Djurgården
3	1
- Date: 21 May 2005
- Venue: Karl-Liebknecht-Stadion, Potsdam
- Referee: Lale Orta
- Attendance: 8,677

The 2005 UEFA Women's Cup Final was a two-legged final match played on 15 and 21 May 2005 between Djurgården of Sweden and Turbine Potsdam of Germany. Turbine Potsdam won the final 5–1 on aggregate.

== Match details ==
=== First leg ===
15 May 2005
13:00 UTC+2

Djurgården (Sweden)	0–2	(Germany) Turbine Potsdam
	Report	Pohlers 34'; Mittag 53'

Stockholms Stadion, Stockholm
Attendance: 1,382
Referee: Anna De Toni (Italy)

Djurgården/Älvsjö	Turbine Potsdam

GK	8	(Sweden) Maja Åström
DF	2	(Sweden) Helén Fagerström
DF	3	(Sweden) Jane Törnqvist (c)
DF	9	(Sweden) Kristin Bengtsson
MF	4	(Sweden) Elin Ekblom
MF	5	(Sweden) Sara Thunebro
MF	7	(Sweden) Malin Nykvist
MF	13	(Sweden) Anna Hall
MF	19	(Sweden) Ann-Marie Norlin	(substituted off) 76'
FW	11	(Sweden) Linda Fagerström
FW	60	(United States) Venus James
Substitutes:
FW	17	(Belgium) Marijke Callebaut	(substituted on) 76'
Manager:
(Sweden) Mikael Söderman

GK	25	(Germany) Nadine Angerer
DF	3	(Germany) Sonja Fuss		(substituted off) 68'
DF	8	(Germany) Inken Becher	(yellow card) 88'
DF	17	(Germany) Ariane Hingst (c)
MF	4	(Germany) Britta Carlson
MF	6	(Germany) Navina Omilade
MF	14	(Germany) Jennifer Zietz
MF	18	(Germany) Viola Odebrecht
FW	9	(Germany) Conny Pohlers
FW	20	(Germany) Petra Wimbersky		(substituted off) 82'
FW	31	(Germany) Anja Mittag
Substitutes:
FW	22	(Germany) Karolin Thomas		(substituted on) 68'
MF	19	(Brazil) Cristiane		(substituted on) 82'
Manager:
(Germany) Bernd Schröder

=== Second leg ===
21 May 2005
13:00 UTC+2

Turbine Potsdam (Germany)	3–1	(Sweden) Djurgården
Wimbersky 2'; Pohlers 9', 16'	Report	Bengtsson 10'

Karl-Liebknecht-Stadion, Potsdam
Attendance: 8,677
Referee: Lale Orta (Turkey)

Turbine Potsdam	Djurgården/Älvsjö

GK	25	(Germany) Nadine Angerer
DF	3	(Germany) Sonja Fuss
DF	8	(Germany) Inken Becher
DF	17	(Germany) Ariane Hingst (c)
MF	4	(Germany) Britta Carlson
MF	6	(Germany) Navina Omilade
MF	14	(Germany) Jennifer Zietz
MF	18	(Germany) Viola Odebrecht
FW	9	(Germany) Conny Pohlers	(substituted off) 74'
FW	20	(Germany) Petra Wimbersky	(substituted off) 79'
FW	31	(Germany) Anja Mittag
Substitutes:
MF	19	(Brazil) Cristiane	(substituted on) 74'
FW	22	(Germany) Karolin Thomas	(substituted on) 79'
Manager:
(Germany) Bernd Schröder

GK	8	(Sweden) Maja Åström
DF	2	(Sweden) Helén Fagerström	(substituted off) 46'
DF	3	(Sweden) Jane Törnqvist (c)
DF	9	(Sweden) Kristin Bengtsson
MF	4	(Sweden) Elin Ekblom
MF	5	(Sweden) Sara Thunebro	(substituted off) 46'
MF	7	(Sweden) Malin Nykvist
MF	19	(Sweden) Ann-Marie Norlin	(substituted off) 53'
FW	11	(Sweden) Linda Fagerström
FW	16	(Sweden) Victoria Svensson
FW	60	(United States) Venus James
Substitutes:
DF	18	(Sweden) Jenny Curtsdotter	(substituted on) 46'
MF	23	(Sweden) Linda Lekander	(substituted on) 46'
MF	13	(Sweden) Anna Hall	(substituted on) 53'
Manager:
(Sweden) Mikael Söderman
