= Elaine (footballer) =

Brazilian footballer and coach (born 1982)

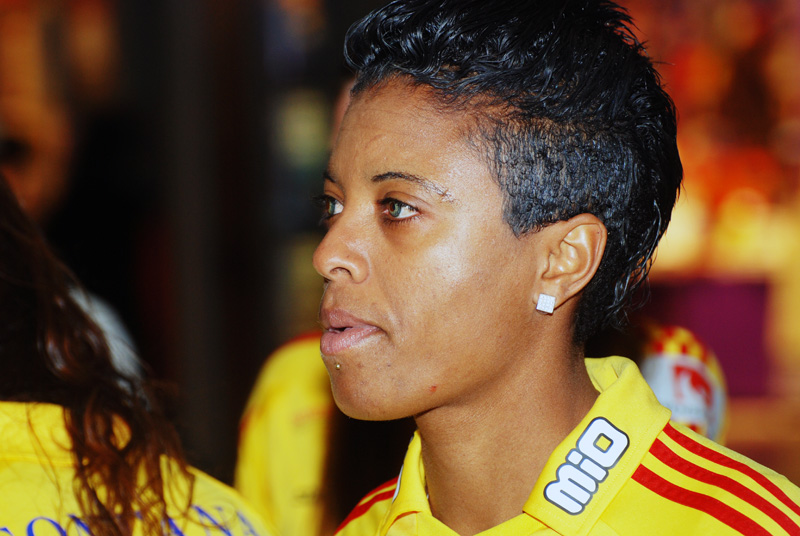
- Elaine with Tyresö in 2012

Personal information
- Full name: Elaine Estrela Moura
- Date of birth: 1 November 1982 (age 43)
- Place of birth: Salvador, Bahia, Brazil
- Height: 5 ft 6 in (1.68 m)
- Position: Midfielder

Youth career
- 2000: Sao Francisco Esporto
2003–2004	Ferroviária		
2005–2009	Umeå IK		
2010	Saint Louis Athletica	3	(0)
2010–2013	Tyresö FF	55	(8)
2013	→ Älta IF (loan)		
2014–2016	Älta IF		
2018–2021	Lindhagen FF		
2022	Karlsbergs DK		

International career^{‡}
Years	Team	Apps	(Gls)
2003–2011	Brazil		
Medal record
Representing Brazil
Olympic Games - Women's Football
Silver medal – second place	2004 Athens	Team competition
Pan American Games - Women's Football
Gold medal – first place	2003 Santo Domingo	Team competition
Gold medal – first place	2007 Rio de Janeiro	Team competition
|}
- ‡ National team caps and goals as of 29 August 2013

Elaine Estrela Moura (born 1 November 1982), commonly known as Elaine, is a Brazilian footballer and coach. A versatile player that can be used in the defense or midfield, she played for the Brazil women's national football team. She previously played for Tyresö and Umeå IK of the Swedish Damallsvenskan, as well as Saint Louis Athletica in the American Women's Professional Soccer (WPS).

== Club career ==
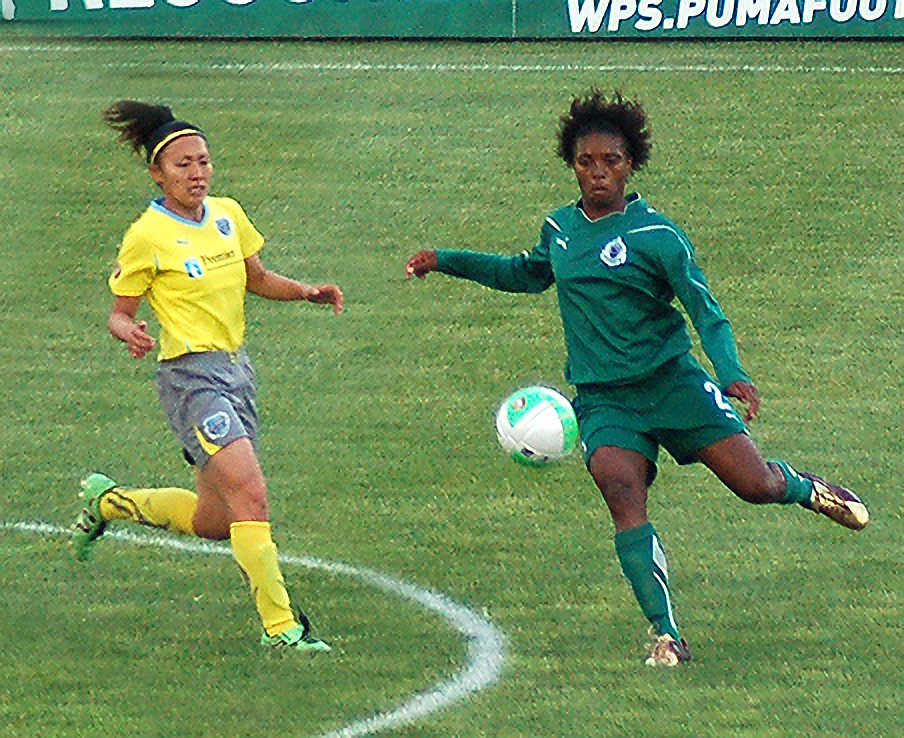
Elaine (R) playing against the Philadelphia Independence.

She started playing soccer influenced by her brother, and played for Bahia teams until 2000, but never getting any salary. Three years later, she became professional in Ferroviária. After a game between the Brazilian national team and Umeå IK in 2004, she was contracted by Umeå and played for them in Damallsvenskan from 2005 to 2009, where she joined Marta.

In 2010, she moved to the United States and played for Saint Louis Athletica in Women's Professional Soccer (WPS). When the club went bust shortly afterwards, she decided to return to Sweden and joined Tyresö FF of the Damallsvenskan.

Tyresö won the Damallsvenskan title for the first time in the 2012 season and Elaine collected her fifth Swedish league winner's medal. With competition for places becoming very strong at Tyresö, Elaine moved on loan to nearby Elitettan club Älta IF in July 2013. Ahead of the 2014 season she made her transfer to Älta permanent.

She stopped playing after the 2014 season and joined Djurgården as an assistant coach for 2015. In 2018 she missed playing and joined Division 3 club Lindhagen FF as a player.

== International career ==
Elaine's performances for Ferroviária brought her to the notice of Brazil women's national football team selectors and she featured in the gold medal-winning national team at the 2003 Pan American Games.

She was selected for the 2004 Athens Olympics and played in the 2–1 overtime final defeat by the United States, as Brazil collected silver medals.

She remained in the national selection for the 2007 Pan American Games, where Brazil retained their gold medals. At the 2007 FIFA Women's World Cup in China, Elaine featured in Brazil's striking 4–0 semi-final win over the United States and the 2–0 final defeat by Germany.

She was included in the final 21-player squad for the 2011 FIFA Women's World Cup in Germany. She was removed from the national team squad two days before the start of the London 2012 Olympics when magnetic resonance imaging revealed a muscle injury.

Her last official games for Brazil took place in December 2011 at the Torneio Internacional Cidade de São Paulo.

== Managerial career ==
In December 2014, Elaine was presented as a member of the Djurgårdens IF coaching team together with head coach Mauri Holappa and Mikael Söderman. As of 5 June 2023, Elaine was a youth football coach at Enskede IK.

== Personal life ==
On 4 February 2021, Elaine reported security guards in Gullmarsplan of Stockholm to police after allegedly being beaten by them and suffering injuries, including a concussion, while attempting to reach the subway on her way home. The guards remained on duty after the incident and claimed to police that the action was necessary because Elaine was allegedly intoxicated, which she denied.
