= Mikael Söderman =

Swedish football manager

Managerial career
- Years: Team
- 2002: Djurgården (women)
- 2005: Djurgården/Älvsjö

Mikael Söderman is a Swedish football manager.

Söderman managed Djurgårdens IF in the 2002 season. He managed Djurgården/Älvsjö during the beginning of the 2005 season until he was replaced by Benny Persson in June 2005. He led the team to the 2005 UEFA Women's Cup Final, where they lost to 1. FFC Turbine Potsdam.

In December 2014, Söderman was presented as a member of the Djurgårdens IF coaching team together with head coach Mauri Holappa and Elaine.
