= Victoria Sandell Svensson =

Swedish footballer (born 1977)

Victoria Sandell
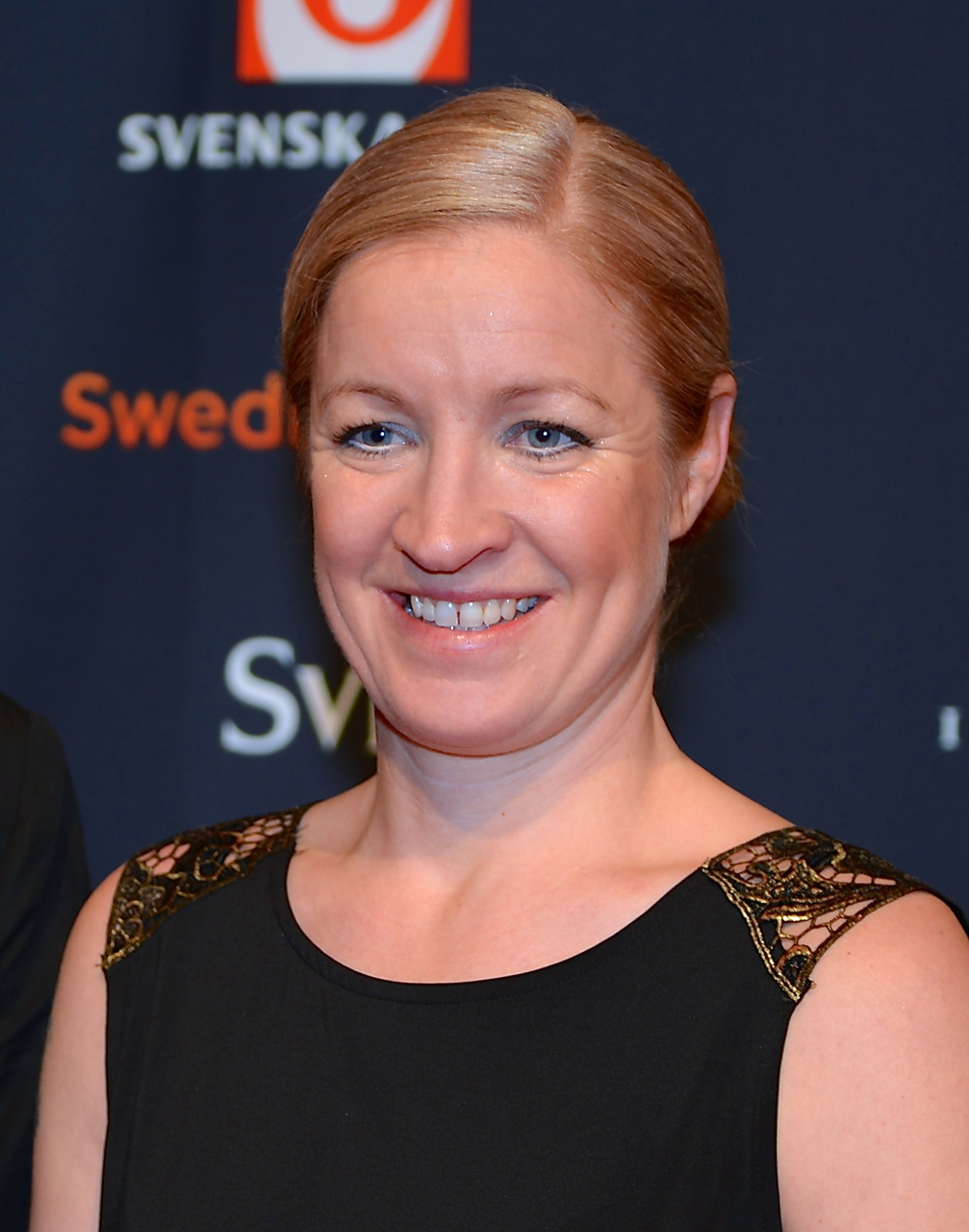
- Victoria Sandell Svensson at the Swedish Sports Awards inside the Stockholm Globe Arena in Stockholm, Sweden in January 2014

Personal information
- Full name: Victoria Margareta Sandell Svensson
- Date of birth: 18 May 1977 (age 49)
- Place of birth: Borås, Sweden
- Height: 1.63 m (5 ft 4 in)
- Position: Striker

Youth career
- 1981: Gällstad IF

Senior career*
Years	Team	Apps	(Gls)
1991	Nittorps IK		
1992–1997	Jitex BK		
1998–2002	Älvsjö AIK		
2003–2009	Djurgårdens IF (Note: 2003–2006 as Djurgården/Älvsjö.)		

International career^{‡}
1993	Sweden U17	8	(9)
1993–1996	Sweden U20	31	(18)
1996–2009	Sweden	166	(68)
- * Club domestic league appearances and goals ‡ National team caps and goals as of 4 September 2009

Victoria Margareta Sandell Svensson (born 18 May 1977) is a Swedish football manager and former player. Nicknamed Vickan, she was team captain on the Swedish women's national team and Djurgårdens IF Dam, captaining the national team during the 2007 FIFA Women's World Cup, and is one of the most merited Swedish footballers of all time. She was originally known as Victoria Svensson, and then Victoria Sandell Svensson after marrying Camilla Sandell in April 2008 and adding her surname to her own.

== Career ==
In 1998, and again in 2003, she won the Diamantbollen, an award given to the best female player in Sweden each year. Also in 1998, 2001, and 2003 Sandell Svensson scored the most goals in the Damallsvenskan.

Sandell Svensson retired after Sweden's Euro 2009 quarter-final defeat to Norway. She had 166 caps and 68 goals.

Sandell Svensson can be seen in the Sveriges Television documentary television series The Other Sport from 2013.

Sandell Svensson has been a sporting director for Djurgården, head coach for the Sweden women's F16 national team, and most recently in 2018–2020 coach for Tyresö FF

On 6 May 2021 Victoria Sandell Svensson was presented as a new assistant coach for the women's national team. She will assume office when the World Cup qualifiers starts in the autumn 2021. She was only contracted for 3 matches, but aims to stay longer if it works well. She will focus on individual training and performance analysis, particularly the offence.

== Matches and goals scored at World Cup and Olympic tournaments ==
Key (expand for notes on "world cup and olympic goals")
Location	Geographic location of the venue where the competition occurred
Lineup	Start – played entire match on minute (off player) – substituted on at the minute indicated, and player was substituted off at the same time off minute (on player) – substituted off at the minute indicated, and player was substituted on at the same time (c) – captain
Min	The minute in the match the goal was scored. For list that include caps, blank indicates played in the match but did not score a goal.
Assist/pass	The ball was passed by the player, which assisted in scoring the goal. This column depends on the availability and source of this information.
penalty or pk	Goal scored on penalty-kick which was awarded due to foul by opponent. (Goals scored in penalty-shoot-out, at the end of a tied match after extra-time, are not included.)
Score	The match score after the goal was scored.
Result	The final score. W – match was won L – match was lost to opponent D – match was drawn (W) – penalty-shoot-out was won after a drawn match (L) – penalty-shoot-out was lost after a drawn match
aet	The score at the end of extra-time; the match was tied at the end of 90' regulation
pso	Penalty-shoot-out score shown in parentheses; the match was tied at the end of extra-time
	Pink background color – Olympic women's football tournament
	Blue background color – FIFA women's world cup final tournament

Goal	Match	Date	Location	Opponent	Lineup	Min	Score	Result	Competition
(United States) USA 1999 FIFA Women's World Cup
	1	1999-6-19	San Jose	China	Start			1–2 L	Group match
	2	1999-6-23	Washington, DC	Australia	Start			3–1 W	Group match
1	3	1999-6-26	Chicago	Ghana	Start	58	1-0	2–0 W	Group match
2	3	1999-6-26	Chicago	Ghana	Start	86	2-0	2–0 W	Group match
	4	1999-6-30	San Jose	Norway	Start			1–3 L	Quarter Final
(Australia) Sydney 2000 Women's Olympic Football Tournament
	5	2000-9-13	Melbourne	Brazil	off 76' (on Sjögran)			0–2 L	Group match
	6	2000-9-16	Sydney	Australia	off 54' (on Sjögran)			1–1 D	Group match
	7	2000-9-19	Melbourne	Germany	on 59' (off Swedberg)			0–1 L	Group match
(United States) USA 2003 FIFA Women's World Cup
3	8	2003-9-21	Washington, DC	United States	Start	58	1–2	1–3 L	Group match
4	9	2003-9-25	Philadelphia	North Korea	Start	7	1–0	1–0 W	Group match
	10	2003-9-28	Columbus	Nigeria	off 85' (on Öqvist)			3–0 W	Group match
5	11	2003-10-1	Foxborough	Brazil	Start	23	1–0	2–1 W	Quarter Final
	12	2003-10-5	Portland	Canada	Start			2–1 W	Semi-Final
	13	2003-10-12	Carson	Germany	Start			1–2 L	Final
(Greece) Athens 2004 Women's Olympic Football Tournament
	14	2004-8-11	Volos	Japan	Start			0–1 L	Group match
	15	2004-8-17	Volos	Nigeria	Start			2–1 W	Group match
	16	2004-8-20	Volos	Australia	Start			2–1 W	Quarter-Final
	17	2004-8-23	Patras	Brazil	Start			0–1 L	Semi Final
	18	2004-8-26	Piraeus	Germany	off 43' (on Sjögran)			0–1 L	Bronze Medal Match
China 2007 FIFA Women's World Cup
6	19	2007-9-11	Chengdu	Nigeria	Start	50	1–0	1–1 D	Group match
	20	2007-9-14	Chengdu	United States	Start			0–2 L	Group match
	21	2007-9-18	Tianjin	North Korea	Start			2–1 W	Group match
(China) Beijing 2008 Women's Olympic Football Tournament
	22	2008-8-6	Tianjin	China	Start			1–2 L	Group match
	23	2008-8-9	Tianjin	Argentina	Start			1–0 W	Group match
	24	2008-8-12	Beijing	Canada	Start			2–1 W	Group match
	25	2008-8-15	Shenyang	Germany	Start			0–2 L	Quarter-Final

== Matches and goals scored at European Championship tournaments ==
Goal	Match	Date	Location	Opponent	Lineup	Min	Score	Result	Competition
(Norway) (Sweden) 1997 European Championship
	1	1997-6-29	Karlstad	Russia	Start			2–1 W	Group match
1 (Note: SVFF credits this goal to Svensson, while other sources mark it an own goal.)	2	1997-7-2	Karlskoga	Spain	off 46'	7	1–0	1–0 W	Group match
	3	1997-7-5	Karlstad	France	off 46'			3–0 W	Group match
	4	1997-7-9	Karlstad	Germany	Start			0–1 L	Semi-Final
(Germany) 2001 European Championship
	5	2001-6-23	Erfurt	Germany	on 74' (off Fagerström)			1–3 L	Group match
	6	2001-6-27	Jena	England	on 53' (off Flyborg)			4–0 W	Group match
	7	2001-6-30	Erfurt	Russia	off 84' (on Lundin)			1–0 W	Group match
	8	2001-7-4	Ulm	Denmark	on 78' (off Nordlund)			1–0 W	Semi-Final
	9	2001-7-7	Ulm	Germany	Start			0–1 L	Final
(England) 2005 European Championship
	10	2005-6-5	Blackpool	Denmark	Start			1–1 D	Group match
	11	2005-6-8	Blackpool	Finland	Start			0–0 D	Group match
	12	2005-6-11	Blackburn	England	off 90+3' (on Öqvist)			1–0 W	Group match
	13	2005-6-16	Warrington	Norway	off 49' (on Schelin)			2–3 L	Semi-Final
(Finland) 2009 European Championship
2	14	2009-8-25	Turku	Russia	off 87' (on Fischer)	15	2–0	3–0 W	Group match
	15	2009-8-28	Turku	Italy	Start			2–0 W	Group match
3	16	2009-8-31	Turku	England	Start	40	1–1	1–1 D	Group match
4	17	2009-9-4	Helsinki	Norway	Start	80	1–3	1–3 L	Quarter-Final

== International goals ==
No.	Date	Venue	Opponent	Score	Result	Competition	Ref.
1.	10 March 1997	Estádio de São Luís, Faro, Portugal	Netherlands	1–0	4–0	1997 Algarve Cup	
2.	2 July 1997	Nobelstadion, Karlskoga, Sweden	Spain	1–0	1–0	UEFA Women's Euro 1997	
3.	30 August 1997	Laugardalsvöllur, Reykjavík, Iceland	Iceland	1–0	3–1	1999 FIFA Women's World Cup qualification	
4.	30 August 1997	Laugardalsvöllur, Reykjavík, Iceland	Iceland	2–0	3–1	1999 FIFA Women's World Cup qualification	
5.	19 March 1998	CD Montechoro, Albufeira, Portugal	Netherlands	1–0	1–0	1998 Algarve Cup	
6.	3 May 1998	Estadio Escribano Castilla, Motril, Spain	Spain	1–1	2–1	1999 FIFA Women's World Cup qualification	
7.	24 May 1998	Söderstadion, Stockholm, Sweden	Spain	2–0	3–1	1999 FIFA Women's World Cup qualification	
8.	26 August 1998	Norrvalla IP, Skellefteå, Sweden	Iceland	2–0	2–0	1999 FIFA Women's World Cup qualification	
9.	26 June 1999	Soldier Field, Chicago, United States	Ghana	1–0	2–0	1999 FIFA Women's World Cup	
10.	26 June 1999	Soldier Field, Chicago, United States	Ghana	2–0	2–0	1999 FIFA Women's World Cup	
11.	7 November 1999	Estadio Municipal de Plasencia, Plasencia, Spain	Spain	1–0	5–2	UEFA Women's Euro 2001 qualifying	
12.	11 June 2000	Nobelstadion, Karlskoga, Sweden	Spain	1–0	7–0	UEFA Women's Euro 2001 qualifying	
13.	11 June 2000	Nobelstadion, Karlskoga, Sweden	Spain	3–0	7–0	UEFA Women's Euro 2001 qualifying	
14.	11 June 2000	Nobelstadion, Karlskoga, Sweden	Spain	4–0	7–0	UEFA Women's Euro 2001 qualifying	
15.	8 September 2000	Carrara Stadium, Gold Coast, Australia	Norway	1–0	2–1	Friendly	
16.	8 September 2000	Carrara Stadium, Gold Coast, Australia	Norway	2–0	2–1	Friendly	
17.	11 March 2001	Estádio Municipal de Lagos, Lagos, Portugal	Portugal	3–1	4–1	2001 Algarve Cup	
18.	9 September 2001	Gammliavallen, Umeå, Sweden	Finland	1–0	8–1	2003 FIFA Women's World Cup qualification	
19.	9 September 2001	Gammliavallen, Umeå, Sweden	Finland	5–1	8–1	2003 FIFA Women's World Cup qualification	
20.	1 March 2002	Estádio Municipal de Albufeira, Albufeira, Portugal	United States	1–1	1–1	2002 Algarve Cup	
21.	3 March 2002	Parque Desportivo da Nora, Ferreiras, Portugal	Norway	1–1	3–3	2002 Algarve Cup	
22.	4 May 2002	Gamla Ullevi, Gothenburg, Sweden	Iceland	3–0	6–0	Friendly	
23.	8 May 2002	Råsunda Stadium, Solna, Sweden	Switzerland	1–0	4–0	2003 FIFA Women's World Cup qualification	
24.	8 May 2002	Råsunda Stadium, Solna, Sweden	Switzerland	3–0	4–0	2003 FIFA Women's World Cup qualification	
25.	26 June 2002	Jakobstads Centralplan, Jakobstad, Finland	Finland	4–0	5–0	2003 FIFA Women's World Cup qualification	
26.	26 June 2002	Jakobstads Centralplan, Jakobstad, Finland	Finland	5–0	5–0	2003 FIFA Women's World Cup qualification	
27.	12 October 2002	Värendsvallen, Växjö, Sweden	Poland	2–0	8–0	Friendly	
28.	26 January 2003	Belconnen Soccer Centre, Canberra, Australia	Mexico	1–1	1–1	2003 Australia Cup	
29.	20 March 2003	Estádio José Arcanjo, Olhão, Portugal	Finland	4–0	5–0	2003 Algarve Cup	
30.	18 April 2003	Fredriksskans, Kalmar, Sweden	Switzerland	2–0	6–0	UEFA Women's Euro 2005 qualifying	
31.	17 May 2003	Råsunda Stadium, Solna, Sweden	Italy	1–0	5–0	UEFA Women's Euro 2005 qualifying	
32.	17 May 2003	Råsunda Stadium, Solna, Sweden	Italy	3–0	5–0	UEFA Women's Euro 2005 qualifying	
33.	15 September 2003	American University Field, Washington, D.C., United States	China	2–1	2–2	Friendly	
34.	21 September 2003	Robert F. Kennedy Memorial Stadium, Washington, D.C., United States	United States	1–2	1–3	2003 FIFA Women's World Cup	
35.	25 September 2003	Lincoln Financial Field, Philadelphia, United States	North Korea	1–0	1–0	2003 FIFA Women's World Cup	
36.	1 October 2003	Gillette Stadium, Foxborough, United States	Brazil	1–0	2–1	2003 FIFA Women's World Cup	
37.	1 February 2004	Shenzhen Stadium, Shenzhen, China	Canada	2–0	3–1	2004 Four Nations Tournament	
38.	20 March 2004	Estádio Municipal de Vila Real de Santo António, Vila Real de Santo António, Portugal	China	1–1	1–1 (5–4 p)	2004 Algarve Cup	
39.	12 May 2004	Värendsvallen, Växjö, Sweden	Serbia and Montenegro	4–1	5–1	UEFA Women's Euro 2005 qualifying	
40.	28 May 2005	Råsunda Stadium, Solna, Sweden	Canada	2–0	3–1	Friendly	
41.	13 March 2006	Estádio Municipal de Lagos, Lagos, Portugal	Finland	1–0	4–1	2006 Algarve Cup	
42.	13 March 2006	Estádio Municipal de Lagos, Lagos, Portugal	Finland	2–0	4–1	2006 Algarve Cup	
43.	13 March 2006	Estádio Municipal de Lagos, Lagos, Portugal	Finland	4–1	4–1	2006 Algarve Cup	
44.	18 June 2006	Darida Stadium, Minsk, Belarus	Belarus	2–0	6–0	2007 FIFA Women's World Cup qualification	
45.	18 June 2006	Darida Stadium, Minsk, Belarus	Belarus	5–0	6–0	2007 FIFA Women's World Cup qualification	
46.	18 June 2006	Darida Stadium, Minsk, Belarus	Belarus	6–0	6–0	2007 FIFA Women's World Cup qualification	
47.	18 July 2006	National Sports Center, Blaine, United States	Canada	1–2	2–4	Friendly	
48.	26 August 2006	Laugardalsvöllur, Reykjavík, Iceland	Iceland	3–0	4–0	2007 FIFA Women's World Cup qualification	
49.	7 March 2007	Estádio Algarve, Faro, Portugal	Finland	2–0	3–0	2007 Algarve Cup	
50.	12 March 2007	Estádio Municipal de Vila Real de Santo António, Vila Real de Santo António, Portugal	United States	2–3	2–3	2007 Algarve Cup	
51.	14 March 2007	Estádio Municipal de Vila Real de Santo António, Vila Real de Santo António, Portugal	France	2–0	3–1	2007 Algarve Cup	
52.	16 June 2007	Stadionul Mogoșoaia, Mogoșoaia, Romania	Romania	1–0	7–0	UEFA Women's Euro 2009 qualifying	
53.	16 June 2007	Stadionul Mogoșoaia, Mogoșoaia, Romania	Romania	3–0	7–0	UEFA Women's Euro 2009 qualifying	
54.	16 June 2007	Stadionul Mogoșoaia, Mogoșoaia, Romania	Romania	4–0	7–0	UEFA Women's Euro 2009 qualifying	
55.	16 June 2007	Stadionul Mogoșoaia, Mogoșoaia, Romania	Romania	5–0	7–0	UEFA Women's Euro 2009 qualifying	
56.	16 June 2007	Stadionul Mogoșoaia, Mogoșoaia, Romania	Romania	6–0	7–0	UEFA Women's Euro 2009 qualifying	
57.	20 June 2007	Tingvalla IP, Karlstad, Sweden	Hungary	1–0	7–0	UEFA Women's Euro 2009 qualifying	
58.	20 June 2007	Tingvalla IP, Karlstad, Sweden	Hungary	5–0	7–0	UEFA Women's Euro 2009 qualifying	
59.	11 September 2007	Chengdu Sports Centre, Chengdu, China	Nigeria	1–0	1–1	2007 FIFA Women's World Cup	
60.	28 November 2007	Råsunda Stadium, Solna, Sweden	Denmark	2–0	3–1	2008 Summer Olympics qualification play-off	
61.	28 November 2007	Råsunda Stadium, Solna, Sweden	Denmark	3–0	3–1	2008 Summer Olympics qualification play-off	
62.	12 March 2008	Estádio José Arcanjo, Olhão, Portugal	Italy	2–0	3–0	2008 Algarve Cup	
63.	12 March 2008	Estádio José Arcanjo, Olhão, Portugal	Italy	3–0	3–0	2008 Algarve Cup	
64.	25 June 2008	Carlisle Grounds, Bray, Republic of Ireland	Republic of Ireland	2–0	5–0	UEFA Women's Euro 2009 qualifying	
65.	25 April 2009	Gamla Ullevi, Gothenburg, Sweden	Brazil	2–1	3–1	Friendly	
66.	25 August 2009	Veritas Stadion, Turku, Finland	Russia	2–0	3–0	UEFA Women's Euro 2009	
67.	31 August 2009	Veritas Stadion, Turku, Finland	England	1–1	1–1	UEFA Women's Euro 2009	
68.	4 September 2009	Finnair Stadium, Helsinki, Finland	Norway	1–3	1–3	UEFA Women's Euro 2009	

== Honours ==
=== Club ===
Älvsjö AIK FF

- Damallsvenskan (2):1998, 1999
- Svenska Cupen: 1999

Djurgården/Älvsjö

- Damallsvenskan (2): 2003, 2004
- Svenska Cupen (2):2004, 2005

=== Individual ===
- Damallsvenskan top scorers: 1998, 2001, 2003
- 2003 FIFA Women's World Cup Silver Ball
- 2003 FIFA Women's World Cup All star team
- Best female player in Sweden (Diamantbollen) (2): 1998, 2003
- Fotbollsgalan 1997
  - Breakthrough of the Year
- Fotbollsgalan 1998
  - Diamantbollen: Best female player in Sweden 1998
- Fotbollsgalan 2003
  - Diamantbollen: Best female player in Sweden 2003
  - Best female striker in Sweden 2003
- Fotbollsgalan 2004
  - Best female striker in Sweden 2004

== International tournaments with the national team ==
- FIFA Women's World Cup 1999: Quarter-final
- FIFA Women's World Cup 2003: Runner-up
- FIFA Women's World Cup 2007: Group stage
- 2000 Summer Olympics in Sydney: Group stage
- 2004 Summer Olympics in Athens: Fourth place
- 2008 Summer Olympics in Beijing: Quarter-final
- UEFA Women's Euro 1997: Semi-finals
- UEFA Women's Euro 2001: Runner-up
- UEFA Women's Euro 2005: Semi-finals
- UEFA Women's Euro 2009: Quarter-final
- Algarve Cup (Participated from 1997 to 2009): Winner 2001, 2009
- Four Nations Tournament: Fourth Place 1998, Third Place 2004
- Australia Cup: Runner-up 2000, Winner 2003

== International tournaments with the national team U-20 ==
- Nordic Cup: Winner 1994

== International tournaments with the national team U-16 ==
- Nordic Cup: Winner 1993
