= Elin Ekblom Bak =

Swedish football midfielder (born 1981)

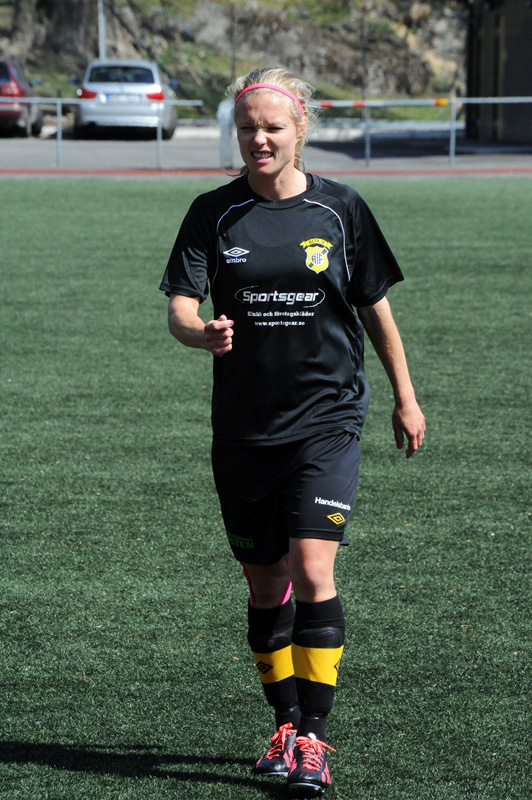

Personal information
- Full name: Elin Ekblom Bak
- Date of birth: 5 June 1981 (age 45)
- Place of birth: Sweden
- Height: 1.71 m (5 ft 7 in)
- Position: Midfielder

Team information
- Current team: Älta IF

Youth career
- Älta IF

Senior career*
Years	Team	Apps	(Gls)
2001–2002	Espanyol		
2003–2004	Hammarby IF		
2005–2007	Djurgårdens IF (Note: 2005–2006 as Djurgården/Älvsjö.)		
2008–2009	AIK	20	(3)
2010–2011	Tyresö FF	44	(7)
2012–	Älta IF		

International career
2004–2011	Sweden	5	(1)
- * Club domestic league appearances and goals

Elin Ekblom Bak (born 5 June 1981) is a Swedish football midfielder, currently playing for Elitettan club Älta IF. She previously played for teams including Tyresö FF in Sweden's Damallsvenskan.

She also works as a scientist, publishing research in the British Journal of Sports Medicine which posited that sedentary behaviour such as sitting at a desk is harmful even for people who exercise regularly.

Ekblom Bak made her senior Sweden debut on 1 February 2004, in a 3–1 win over Canada.

She signed a professional contract with Espanyol in Spain, but rules prevented her from playing League matches, only in Cup and non competitive games. Ekblom Bak engaged sports lawyer Jean-Louis Dupont to make a legal challenge on her behalf and the rules eventually changed, but disgruntled Ekblom Bak had already decided to leave.
