= Eklöf =

Eklöf is a Nordic surname. Notable people with the surname include:

- Linus Eklöf (born 1989), Swedish motorcycle speedway rider
- Nils Eklöf (1904–1987), Swedish runner
- Patrik Eklöf, Swedish footballer
- Verner Eklöf (1897–1955), Finnish footballer
