= Holappa =

Holappa is a Finnish surname. Notable people with the surname include:

- Mauri Holappa (born 1965), Finnish footballer and coach
- Pentti Holappa (1927–2017), Finnish poet, writer, and politician
