= Sofia Lundgren =

Swedish footballer (born 1982)

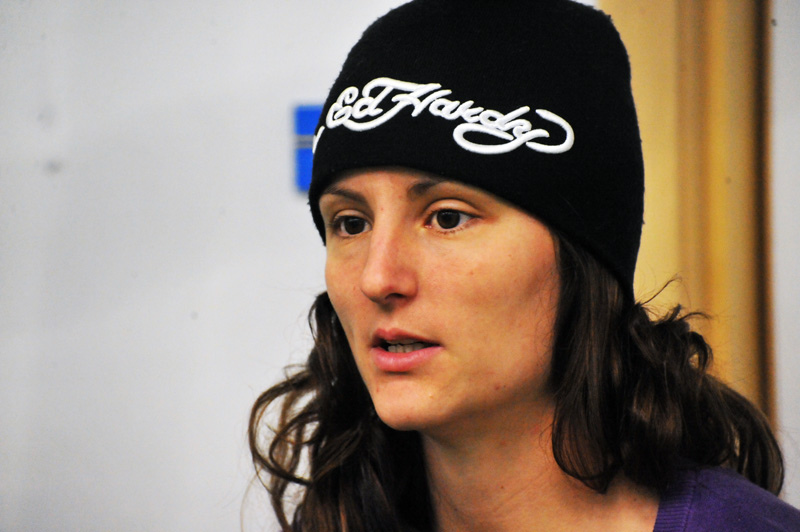

Personal information
- Full name: Sofia Lundgren
- Date of birth: 20 September 1982 (age 44)
- Place of birth: Umeå, Sweden
- Height: 1.72 m (5 ft 8 in)
- Position: Goalkeeper

Youth career
- Ersmark IK
- Ersboda SK

Senior career*
Years	Team	Apps	(Gls)
1998–1999	Umeå Södra FF		
1999–2006	Umeå IK		
2007–2008	AIK	22	(0)
2009–2013	Linköpings FC	95	(0)
2015	Hammarby IF	22	(0)
2016	FC Rosengård	9	(0)

International career^{‡}
2002–2012	Sweden	30	(0)
Medal record
Women's football
Representing Sweden
FIFA Women's World Cup
Silver medal – second place	2003 United States	Team
Bronze medal – third place	2011 Germany	Team
- * Club domestic league appearances and goals as of 16 November 2016 ‡ National team caps and goals as of 21:18, 14 May 2015 (UTC)

Sofia Lundgren (born 20 September 1982) is a Swedish former footballer who played as a goalkeeper.

She has formerly played for leading Swedish teams such as Umeå IK and AIK before signing a two-year contract with Linköpings FC in the autumn of 2008.

Since making her national team debut in a 6–3 win over England in March 2002, Lundgren competed with Caroline Jönsson, Hedvig Lindahl and latterly Kristin Hammarström for the goalkeeper position.

When Lundgren was injured before the tournament, Maja Åström was drafted into Sweden's squad for UEFA Women's Euro 2005 as the third choice goalkeeper.

A back injury kept a frustrated Lundgren out of Sweden's 2013 Algarve Cup squad. The injury eventually kept Lundgren out of all football for one-and-a-half seasons. She signed for Damallsvenskan newcomers Hammarby IF DFF in January 2015. At the beginning of the 2016 season Lundgren signed a short-term contract with Swedish champions FC Rosengård. The contract was extended when Rosengård's first choice goalkeeper Erin McLeod suffered an anterior cruciate ligament injury and Zećira Mušović struggled to overcome a broken arm.
