= Annica Svensson =

Swedish footballer (born 1983)

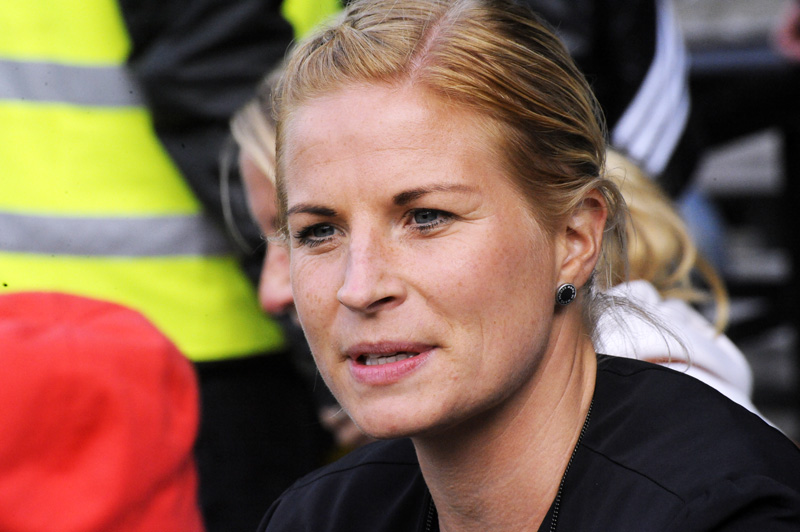
- Svensson in June 2013

Personal information
- Full name: Annica Birgitta Teres Svensson
- Date of birth: 3 March 1983 (age 43)
- Place of birth: Björneborg, Sweden
- Height: 1.66 m (5 ft 5 in)
- Position: Defender

Youth career
- Björneborgs IF
- 1989–1995: Bäckhammars SK

Senior career*
Years	Team	Apps	(Gls)
1997–2002	Rävåsens IK		
2002	Älvsjö AIK		
2003–2005	Djurgården/Älvsjö		
2006–2010	Hammarby IF DFF	52	(6)
2010–2013	Tyresö FF	53	(0)
2013	→ Vittsjö GIK (loan)	9	(0)
2014–2018	Eskilstuna United DFF	67	(4)

International career^{‡}
	Sweden U17	6	(0)
	Sweden U19	4	(0)
2010–2014	Sweden	33	(0)
Medal record
Women's football
Representing Sweden
FIFA Women's World Cup
Bronze medal – third place	2011 Germany	Team
- * Club domestic league appearances and goals as of 13:06, 18 January 2014 (UTC) ‡ National team caps and goals as of 13:06, 18 January 2014 (UTC)

Annica Birgitta Teres Svensson (born 3 March 1983) is a Swedish former football defender who last played in Sweden for Eskilstuna United DFF. She previously played for Tyresö FF, and spent the second half of the 2013 season on loan at Vittsjö GIK. She represented Sweden at the 2011 FIFA Women's World Cup and the 2012 London Olympics.

== Career ==
A late bloomer, Svensson made her Sweden debut at the age of 27, in a 1–1 draw with United States on 30 July 2010.

Svensson played ten times for Sweden's national youth teams, with the last appearance in 2001. She was called into the senior national team two years after suffering an anterior cruciate ligament injury while captaining Hammarby IF DFF in the Damallsvenskan. National coach Thomas Dennerby valued the versatility of Svensson, who can function in the centre back or full back positions.

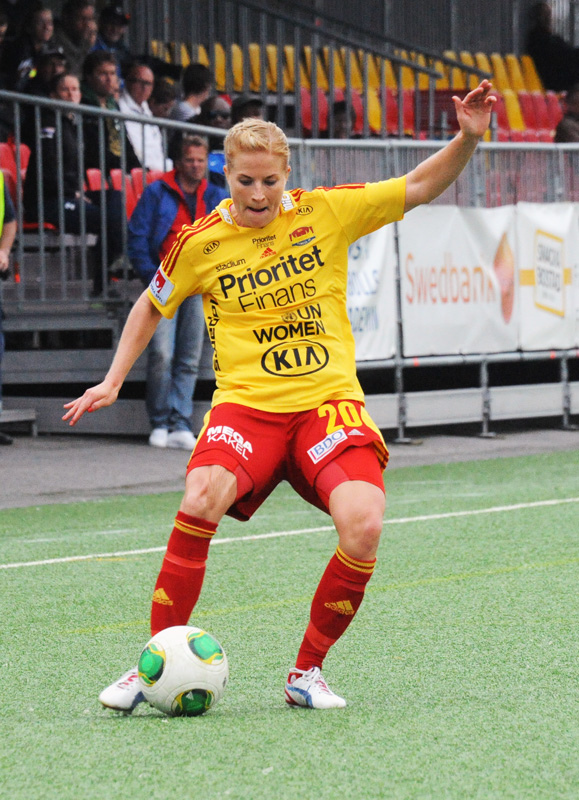
Playing for Tyresö in May 2013

Tyresö won the Damallsvenskan title for the first time in the 2012 season and Svensson collected her first league winner's medal.

As ambitious Tyresö continued to strengthen their squad, Svensson lost her place in the team and was not called up to Sweden's UEFA Women's Euro 2013 selection. In August 2013 she went on loan to Damallsvenskan team Vittsjö GIK, in search of first team football. She signed for newly promoted Eskilstuna United DFF in January 2014, where she joined former Tyresö teammate Sara Thunebro.

In October 2018 Svensson officially ended her career.

== Personal life ==
In December 2018, she married her former Eskilstuna team-mate Vaila Barsley.

== Honours ==
=== Club ===
Djurgården/Älvsjö

- Damallsvenskan (2): 2003, 2004
