= 1989 Damallsvenskan =

Swedish football league season

The 1989 Damallsvenskan was the second season of the Damallsvenskan. Matches were played between 21 April and 29 September 1989. Jitex BK won the league by one point from Malmö FF. Defending champions Öxabäck IF came in third. In the playoffs, Jitex won the finals.

The two teams promoted before the season were Djurgården and Mariestads BoIS. At the end of the season, Trollhättans IF and IK Brage were relegated.

== Table ==
Pos	Team	Pld	W	D	L	GF	GA	GD	Pts	Qualification or relegation
1	Jitex BK (C, Q)	22	15	4	3	73	19	+54	34	Qualified for playoffs
2	Malmö FF (Q)	22	15	3	4	47	27	+20	33	Qualified for playoffs
3	Öxabäck IF (Q, M)	22	12	4	6	48	20	+28	28	Qualified for playoffs
4	Djurgården (Q, N)	22	13	2	7	39	24	+15	28	Qualified for playoffs
5	Mallbackens IF	22	10	5	7	26	26	0	25	
6	Gideonsbergs IF	22	9	4	9	28	34	−6	22	
7	GAIS Göteborg	22	7	6	9	32	38	−6	20	
8	Mariestads BoIS (N)	22	8	3	11	37	34	+3	19	
9	Hammarby	22	7	3	12	27	43	−16	17	
10	Strömsbro IF	22	6	5	11	27	51	−24	17	
11	Trollhättans IF (R)	22	4	6	12	24	39	−15	14	Relegated
12	IK Brage (R)	22	2	3	17	18	71	−53	7	Relegated

Source: Clas Glenning Football
(C) Champions; (M) Defending champions; (N) Newly promoted to the competition before the season; (Q) Qualified for the phase indicated; (R) Relegated

== Playoffs ==
=== Semifinals ===
The first matches were played on 7 October, and the first teams marked played at home first. The return games took place on 14 October (Malmö – Öxabäck) and 15 October (Jitex – Djurgården).

Team 1	Result	Team 2	Match 1	Match 2
Öxabäck IF	2-4	Malmö FF	1-2	1-2
Djurgården	1-1	Jitex BK	1-1	0-0

Jitex won on away goals.

=== Final ===
The final was played on 29 October and 5 November 1989. The first home team are marked first.

Team 1	Result	Team 2	Match 1	Match 2
Malmö FF	1-3	Jitex BK	1-2	0-1
