= Julie Hauge Andersson =

Danish footballer (born 1970)

Personal information
- Full name: Julie Hauge Andersson
- Date of birth: 2 January 1970 (age 56)
- Place of birth: Denmark
- Position: Defender

Senior career*
Years	Team	Apps	(Gls)
1992–1999	Fortuna Hjørring		
1999–2002	Odense		

International career
1999–2001	Denmark	14	(2)
- * Club domestic league appearances and goals

Julie Hauge Andersson is a Danish former football defender who played for Fortuna Hjørring and Odense BK in the Elitedivisionen. She was a member of the Danish national team for two years, taking part in the 2001 European Championship.
