= Jane Törnqvist =

Swedish footballer (born 1975)

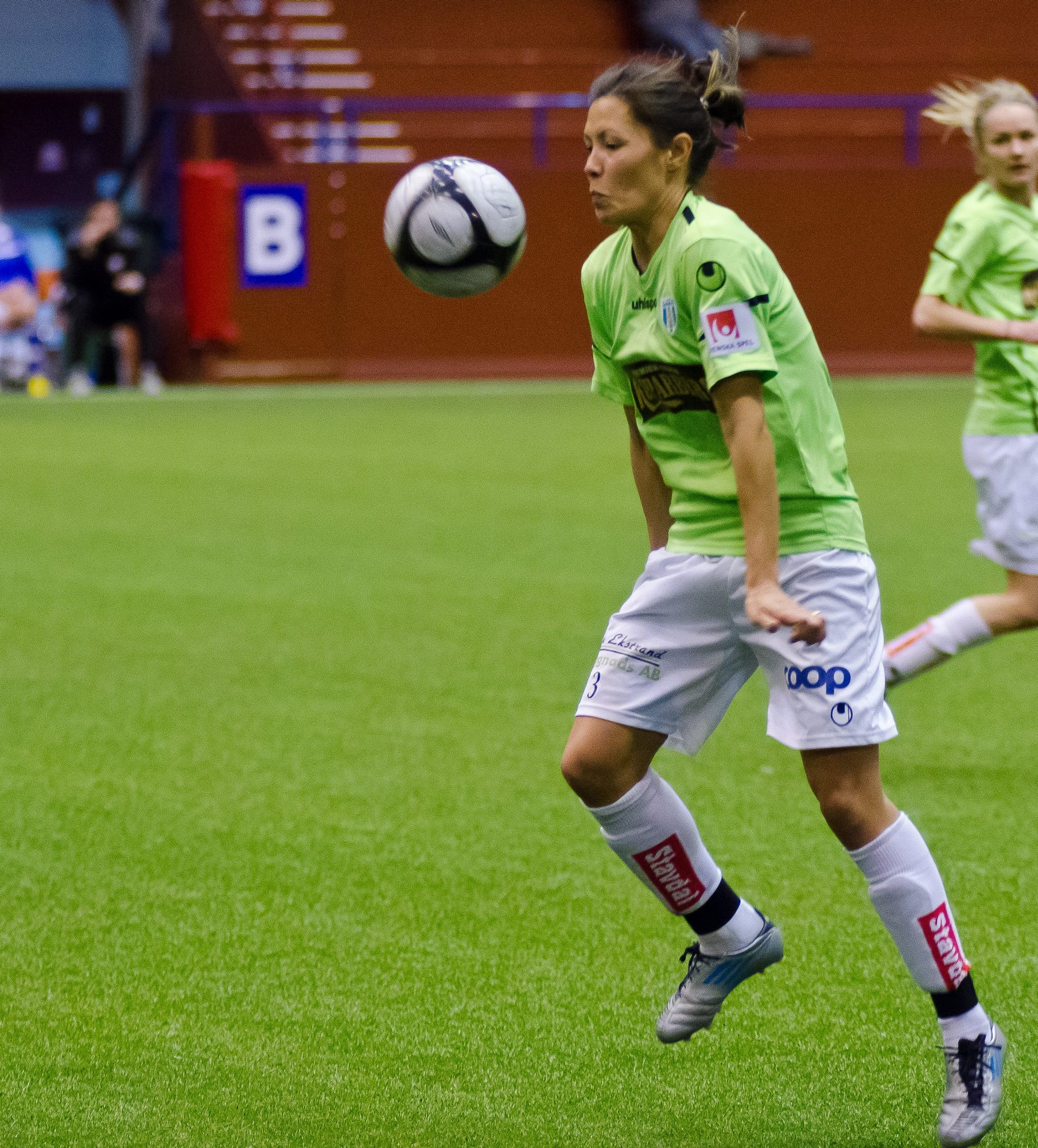
- Törnqvist playing for Kopparbergs/Göteborg FC in 2012

Personal information
- Date of birth: 9 May 1975 (age 51)
- Place of birth: Manila, Philippines
- Height: 1.70 m (5 ft 7 in)
- Position: Centre back

Youth career
- Hallsta IK

Senior career*
Years	Team	Apps	(Gls)
1989–1990	Häverödals SK		
1991–1992	Rimbo IF		
1993–1995	Tyresö FF		
1996–1998	Hammarby IF		
1999–2002	Älvsjö AIK FF		
2003–2007	Djurgårdens IF (Note: 2003–2006 as Djurgården/Älvsjö.)		
2008–2012	Kopparbergs/Göteborg FC	100	(13)

International career^{‡}
1995–2005	Sweden	109	(11)
- * Club domestic league appearances and goals ‡ National team caps and goals as of 18 October 2007

Jane Törnqvist (born 9 May 1975) is a former footballer who most recently played for Kopparbergs/Göteborg FC. A tough tackling central defender, she wore number 3 for her club. She played 109 games for the Sweden women's national team before retiring from international football in 2005. She also served as the Strength and Conditioning coach of India women's football team for the 2022 AFC Women's Asian Cup.

== Career ==
=== Club ===
Törnqvist started her career in Hallsta IK. Törnqvist played for Häverödals SK, Rimbo IF, Tyresö FF, Hammarby IF and Älvsjö AIK.

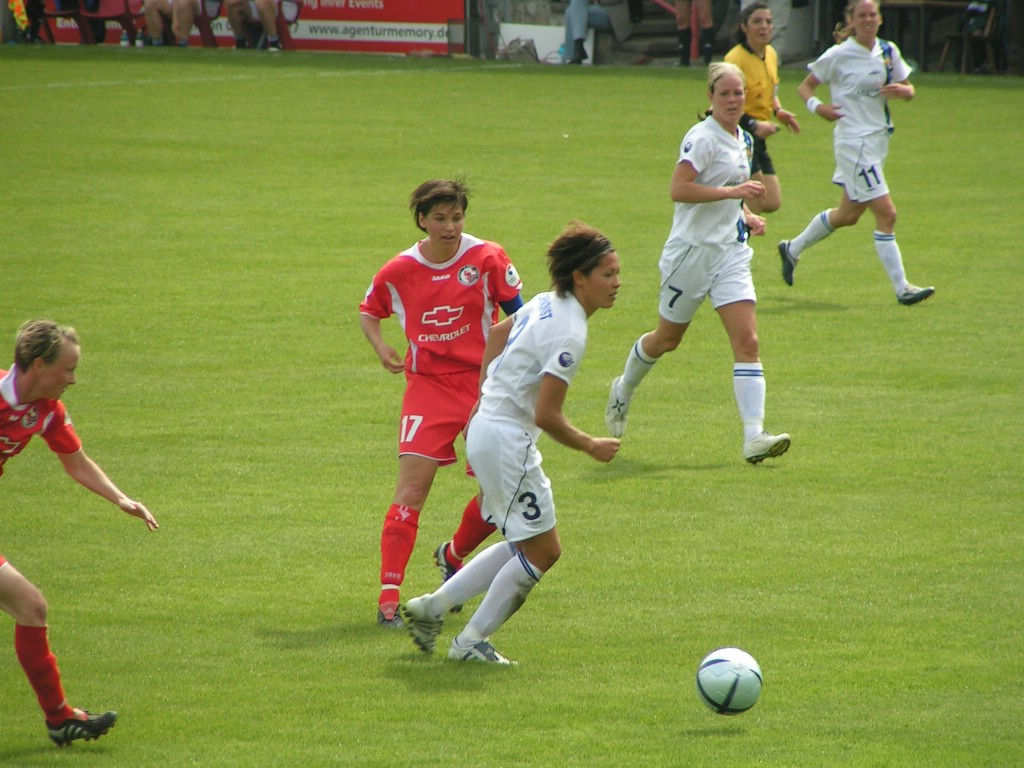
Jane Törnqvist (with ball) for Djurgården/Älvsjö against 1. FFC Turbine Potsdam in the 2005 UEFA Women's Cup Final.

When Älvsjö AIK and Djurgårdens IF merged to become Djurgården/Älvsjö, Törnqvist was on the new team. Törnqvist played five seasons with the team. She was part of the 2003 and 2004 Damallsvenskan winning teams. She also played in the 2005 UEFA Women's Cup Final, when Djurgården/Älvsjö lost to 1. FFC Turbine Potsdam. She retired after the 2007 season, however Kopparbergs/Göteborg FC manager Torbjörn Nilsson managed to bring her to his team. In late 2007, Törnqvist joined Kopparbergs/Göteborg FC. During her time with Kopparbergs/Göteborg FC, she made 100 league appearances and scored 13 goals. She finished her career in 2012.

=== International ===
After winning seven caps at Under 17 level and 33 Under 21 caps, Törnqvist made her senior Sweden debut in a 3–0 win over Finland on 30 August 1995. She tore her ACL during UEFA Women's Euro 2001 and missed Sweden's extra time defeat to Germany in the final. Two years later she was back in the team as Sweden suffered another golden goal loss to Germany in the World Cup final.

Jane Törnqvist appeared for Sweden in two World Cups (USA 1999, USA 2003), and two Olympic Games (Sydney 2000, Athens 2004). She played in three European Championship tournaments: Norway/Sweden 1997, Germany 2001, and England 2005.

==== Matches and goals scored at World Cup & Olympic tournaments ====
Key (expand for notes on "world cup and olympic goals")
Location	Geographic location of the venue where the competition occurred
Lineup	Start – played entire match on minute (off player) – substituted on at the minute indicated, and player was substituted off at the same time off minute (on player) – substituted off at the minute indicated, and player was substituted on at the same time (c) – captain
Min	The minute in the match the goal was scored. For list that include caps, blank indicates played in the match but did not score a goal.
Assist/pass	The ball was passed by the player, which assisted in scoring the goal. This column depends on the availability and source of this information.
penalty or pk	Goal scored on penalty-kick which was awarded due to foul by opponent. (Goals scored in penalty-shoot-out, at the end of a tied match after extra-time, are not included.)
Score	The match score after the goal was scored.
Result	The final score. W – match was won L – match was lost to opponent D – match was drawn (W) – penalty-shoot-out was won after a drawn match (L) – penalty-shoot-out was lost after a drawn match
aet	The score at the end of extra-time; the match was tied at the end of 90' regulation
pso	Penalty-shoot-out score shown in parentheses; the match was tied at the end of extra-time
	Pink background color – Olympic women's football tournament
	Blue background color – FIFA women's world cup final tournament

Goal	Match	Date	Location	Opponent	Lineup	Min	Score	Result	Competition
(United States) USA 1999 FIFA Women's World Cup
	1	1999-6-19	San Jose	China	Start			1–2 L	Group match
1	2	1999-6-23	Washington, DC	Australia	off 75' (on Sundh)	8	1-0	3–1 W	Group match
	3	1999-6-26	Chicago	Ghana	Start			2–0 W	Group match
	4	1999-6-30	San Jose	Norway	Start			1–3 L	Quarter Final
(Australia) Sydney 2000 Women's Olympic Football Tournament
	5	2000-9-13	Melbourne	Brazil	off 85' (on Fagerström)			0–2 L	Group match
	6	2000-9-16	Sydney	Australia	Start			1–1 D	Group match
	7	2000-9-19	Melbourne	Germany	Start			0–1 L	Group match
(United States) USA 2003 FIFA Women's World Cup
	8	2003-9-21	Washington, DC	United States	Start			1–3 L	Group match
	9	2003-9-25	Philadelphia	North Korea	Start			1–0 W	Group match
	10	2003-10-1	Foxborough	Brazil	Start			2–1 W	Quarter Final
	11	2003-10-5	Portland	Canada	Start			2–1 W	Semi-Final
	12	2003-10-12	Carson	Germany	Start			1–2 L	Final
(Greece) Athens 2004 Women's Olympic Football Tournament
	13	2004-8-11	Volos	Japan	Start			0–1 L	Group match
	14	2004-8-26	Piraeus	Germany	Start			0–1 L	Bronze Medal Match

==== Matches and goals scored at European Championship tournaments ====
Goal	Match	Date	Location	Opponent	Lineup	Min	Score	Result	Competition
(Norway) (Sweden) 1997 European Championship
	1	1997-6-29	Karlstad	Russia	Start			2–1 W	Group match
	2	1997-7-2	Karlskoga	Spain	Start			1–0 W	Group match
	3	1997-7-5	Karlstad	France	Start			3–0 W	Group match
	4	1997-7-9	Karlstad	Germany	Start			0–1 L	Semi-Final
(Germany) 2001 European Championship
	5	2001-6-23	Erfurt	Germany	Start			1–3 L	Group match
1	6	2001-6-27	Jena	England	Start	2	1-0	4–0 W	Group match
	7	2001-6-30	Erfurt	Russia	Start			1–0 W	Group match
(England) 2005 European Championship
	8	2005-6-5	Blackpool	Denmark	Start			1–1 D	Group match
	9	2005-6-8	Blackpool	Finland	Start			0–0 D	Group match
	10	2005-6-11	Blackburn	England	Start			1–0 W	Group match
	11	2005-6-16	Warrington	Norway	Start			2–3 L	Semi-Final

== Honours ==
=== Club ===
Djurgårdens IF

- Damallsvenskan (2): 2003, 2004
