= Älta =

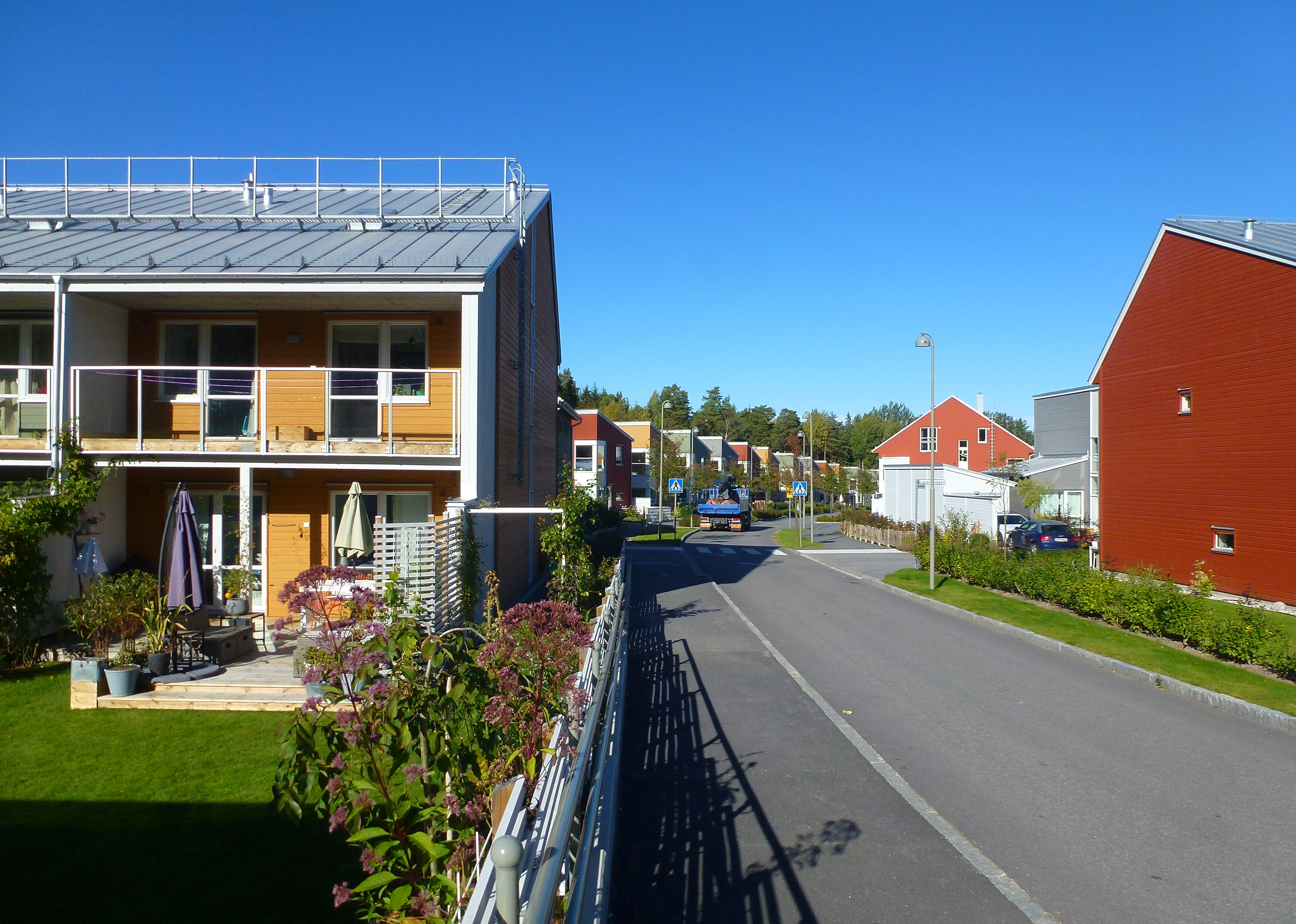

- Location within Stockholm Location within Sweden
- Coordinates: 59°15′N 18°11′E
- Country: Sweden
- Province: Södermanland
- County: Stockholm County
- Municipality: Nacka Municipality

Area
  - Total: 3.32 km^{2} (1.28 sq mi)

Population (31 December 2010)
  - Total: 9,989
  - Density: 3,011/km^{2} (7,800/sq mi)
- Time zone: UTC+1 (CET)
  - Summer (DST): UTC+2 (CEST)

Älta is a locality situated in Nacka Municipality, Stockholm County, Sweden with 14,103 inhabitants in 2019.

== Sports ==
The following sports clubs are located in Älta:

- Älta IF
