= Håbo FF =

- Full name: Håbo Fotbollsförening
- Founded: 1996
- Ground: Futurum konstgräs, Bålsta
- League: Division 4
- 2023: 3rd, Division 4 Uppland

Håbo Fotbollsförening is a Swedish association football club from Bålsta.

The club was founded in 1996 as a merger of Bålsta IF och Övergrans IF. The women's team would start in the Division 2 and the men's team in Division 3.

In the 1997–98 Svenska Cupen for men, Håbo reached the second round, where they were eliminated by Reymersholms IK. Håbo's manager Benny Persson led the team to contest the 1998 and 1999 Division 2, before being hired by IF Brommapojkarna ahead of the 2000 season. Another upsurge happened in the 2010s, when Håbo managed three straight promotions from Division 5 to contest the 2016 Division 2.

The women's team plays in Division 3.
