= Vaila Barsley =

English footballer (born 1987)

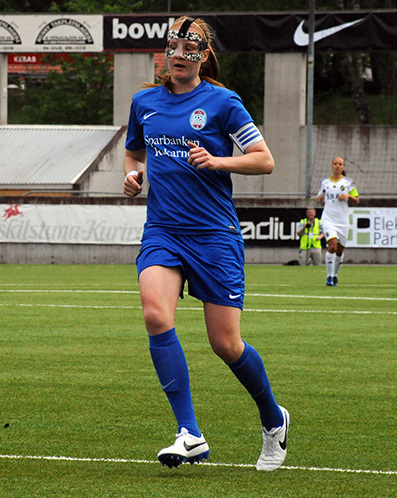
- Barsley in 2014

Personal information
- Full name: Vaila Marie Barsley
- Date of birth: 15 September 1987 (age 39)
- Place of birth: Boston, Lincolnshire, England
- Height: 1.83 m (6 ft 0 in)
- Position: Defender

Youth career
- Stalham Knights
- Loddon
- 2004–2005: Norwich City
- 2005–2006: Arsenal

College career
Years	Team	Apps	(Gls)
2006–2009	St. John's Red Storm	65	(8)

Senior career*
Years	Team	Apps	(Gls)
2009–2010	Long Island Rough Riders		
2011	Afturelding	16	(3)
2012	Long Island Rough Riders		
2012	Peamount United		
2013–2021	Eskilstuna United	164	(25)
2022	IF Brommapojkarna	19	(2)

International career^{‡}
2003–2004	England U17		
2017	Scotland	6	(0)
- * Club domestic league appearances and goals as of 10:26, 18 December 2022 (UTC) ‡ National team caps and goals as of 10:58, 12 April 2017 (UTC)

Vaila Marie Barsley (born 15 September 1987) is a Scottish football defender.

== Club career ==
Barsley played college soccer for St. John's Red Storm while attending St. John's University on a five-year accountancy degree. After graduating she began working for Ernst & Young in New York City, but negotiated a leave of absence when Swedish club Eskilstuna United offered her a professional soccer contract in 2013. Barsley's nine goals from defence helped Eskilstuna win promotion to the Damallsvenskan in her first season. In the 2015 Damallsvenskan season, Eskilstuna finished runners-up to FC Rosengård and Barsley was awarded a new two-year contract.

In March 2022 she transferred to Damallsvenskan newcomers IF Brommapojkarna, following nine seasons with Eskilstuna.

== International career ==
Barsley's mother is from Shetland, which qualifies her to play for Scotland. She made her full international debut on 11 April 2017, in a 5–0 defeat against Belgium.

== Personal life ==
In December 2018 she married her former Eskilstuna team-mate Annica Svensson.

== Honours ==
Eskilstuna United DFF

- Damallsvenskan Runner-up: 2015
