= Selma Svendsen =

Danish footballer (born 2001)

Personal information
- Full name: Selma Larsen Svendsen
- Date of birth: 21 June 2001 (age 25)
- Place of birth: Lyngby, Denmark
- Height: 1.69 m (5 ft 7 in)
- Position: Defender

Team information
- Current team: Djurgårdens IF
- Number: 24

Youth career
- Lundtofte Boldklub
- B.93
- Oure Academy

Senior career*
Years	Team	Apps	(Gls)
2017-2020	B.93	42	(1)
2020-2025	HB Køge	122	(0)
2025–	Djurgårdens IF	6	(0)

International career^{‡}
2016	Denmark U16	2	(0)
2018	Denmark U17	3	(0)
2019-2020	Denmark U19	7	(0)
2023	Denmark U23	5	(0)
- * Club domestic league appearances and goals as of 4 October 2025 ‡ National team caps and goals as of 4 October 2025

Selma Svendsen (born 21 June 2001) is a Danish football player who plays as a defender for Damallsvenskan club Djurgårdens IF in the Swedish top-division and previously the Danish national junior teams.

With Køge she won the domestic league in the 2020–21 season of Elitedivisionen, for the first time in the club's history.

In August 2018, she made her debut in the Danish 3F-liga, at the age of 17 years old, for her former club B.93. In July 2025, Svendsen signed three-year contract with Swedish Djurgårdens IF, after five seasons in the Elitedivisionen.

== International career ==
She has appeared for the Danish national youth team and the Danish national junior team, several times. Svendsen most recently played for the Denmark women's national under-19 football team at the 2020 La Manga Tournament.

== Honours ==
- A-Liga
  - Winner (3): 2020–21, 2021–22, 2022–23
