= Daniel Kalles Pettersson =

Swedish football manager

Managerial career
- Years: Team
- 2009: Hammarby (women)
- 2010: Djurgården (women)

Daniel Kalles Pettersson is a Swedish football manager.

== Coaching career ==
Kalles Pettersson took over Damallsvenskan team Hammarby IF DFF for the 2009 season. In August 2009, he was sacked from Hammarby IF DFF. During the 2010 season, he managed Djurgården's women's team.
