= Anders Johansson (football manager) =

Swedish football manager (born 1967)

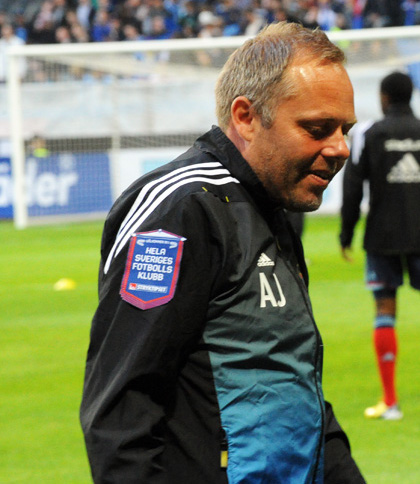

Personal information
- Date of birth: 1967 (age 58–59)
- Place of birth: Sollentuna, Sweden

Team information
- Current team: AFC Eskilstuna (assistant)

Managerial career
- Years: Team
- Edsbergs IF
- IFK Täby
- Bollstanäs SK
- Väsby IK
- 2000–2002: Älvsjö AIK
- 2003–2005: Malmö FF Dam
- 2006–2007: Malmö FF (assistant)
- 2008–2009: Djurgårdens IF Dam
- 2010–: Djurgårdens IF (assistant)
- 2013: Djurgårdens IF (caretaker manager)
- 2017–: AFC Eskilstuna (assistant)

Anders Johansson (born 1967) is a Swedish football manager. He has worked mostly as a manager of women's football teams, but also as assistant manager for both Malmö FF and Djurgårdens IF.

Johansson was the head coach for Sweden women's national under-19 football team from 2018 to 2020.
