= Jörgen Lindman =

Swedish footballer (born 1952)

Personal information
- Date of birth: 7 August 1952 (age 74)
- Position: Defender

Senior career*
| Years | Team | Apps | (Gls) |
- Djurgården
- Vasalunds IF

Managerial career
- 1983: Djurgården (women)
- 1988: Djurgården (women)
- * Club domestic league appearances and goals

Jörgen Lindman (born 7 August 1951) is a Swedish former professional footballer who played as a defender. He made 70 Allsvenskan appearances for Djurgården and scored one goal.

Lindman managed Djurgården's women's team in the 1983 and 1988 seasons.

Jörgen is the brother of Djurgården footballer Sven Lindman.
