= Nanne Ruuskanen =

Finnish footballer (born 2001)

Personal information
- Date of birth: 19 November 2001 (age 24)
- Place of birth: Finland
- Position: Centre back

Team information
- Current team: Djurgården

Senior career*
Years	Team	Apps	(Gls)
2018	Pallokissat	3	(0)
2019–2022	KuPS	83	(6)
2023–2024	Brann	11	(0)
2025–	Djurgården	0	(0)

International career^{‡}
2019	Finland U18	1	(0)
2022–	Finland U23	3	(0)
- * Club domestic league appearances and goals as of 30 December 2024 ‡ National team caps and goals as of 3 December 2024

Nanne Ruuskanen (born 19 November 2001) is a Finnish professional footballer who plays as a centre back for Damallsvenskan club Djurgården.

== Career ==
Ruuskanen debuted in Naisten Liiga with Pallokissat in 2018.

While playing for Kuopion Palloseura (KuPS), they won two Finnish championship titles in 2021 and 2022. After spending four seasons with KuPS in Kansallinen Liiga, Ruuskanen joined Norwegian club SK Brann for the 2023 season.

She left Brann in November 2024, after having suffered from injury almost the whole 2024 season.

== International career ==
Finland women's national team

== Personal life ==
On 16 January 2025, Ruuskanen signed with Djurgården.

== Honours ==
KuPS

- Kansallinen Liiga (2): 2021, 2022

Brann

- Toppserien runner-up: 2024
