= Benny Persson =

Swedish football manager

Managerial career
- Years: Team
- Djurgården (ass. coach)
- 1997–1999: Håbo
- 2000–2003: Brommapojkarna
- 2004: Väsby United
- 2005: Syrianska
- 2005–2007: Djurgården/Älvsjö (women)
- 2008: AIK (women)

Benny Persson is a Swedish football manager.

== Coaching career ==
Persson started his coaching career in Djurgården's youth teams. Later in the decade, he was an assistant coach for the Djurgården senior team. When the clubs Bålsta IF and Övergrans IF merged to form Håbo FF ahead of the 1997 season, Persson managed the men's team which would start in the Division 3. Persson led the team to contest the 1998 and 1999 Division 2, before being hired by IF Brommapojkarna ahead of the 2000 season. Persson managed Brommapojkarna during four seasons until 2003. He then managed FC Väsby United and Syrianska FC.

In the summer of 2005, he took over Djurgården/Älvsjö. In late 2007, Persson took over AIK women's team He left AIK after having finished fourth in the 2008 Damallsvenskan.
