= Tina Kindvall =

Swedish footballer

Senior career*
Years	Team	Apps	(Gls)
- Djurgården/Älvsjö
- * Club domestic league appearances and goals

Tina Kindvall is a Swedish former footballer. Kindvall was part of the Djurgården Swedish champions' team of 2003. She is the daughter of Ove Kindvall and sister of Niclas Kindvall.

== Honours ==
Djurgården/Älvsjö

- Damallsvenskan: 2003
