= Ulrika Björn =

Swedish footballer

Personal information
- Date of birth: 14 May 1973 (age 53)

Senior career*
Years	Team	Apps	(Gls)
- Djurgården/Älvsjö

International career^{‡}
	Sweden	9	(4)
- * Club domestic league appearances and goals ‡ National team caps and goals as of 2017

Ulrika Björn (born 14 May 1973) is a retired Swedish footballer. Björn was part of the Djurgården Swedish champions' team of 2003.

== Honours ==
=== Club ===
Djurgården/Älvsjö

- Damallsvenskan: 2003
