= UEFA Women's Euro 2001 =

Fußball-Europameisterschaft der Frauen 2001
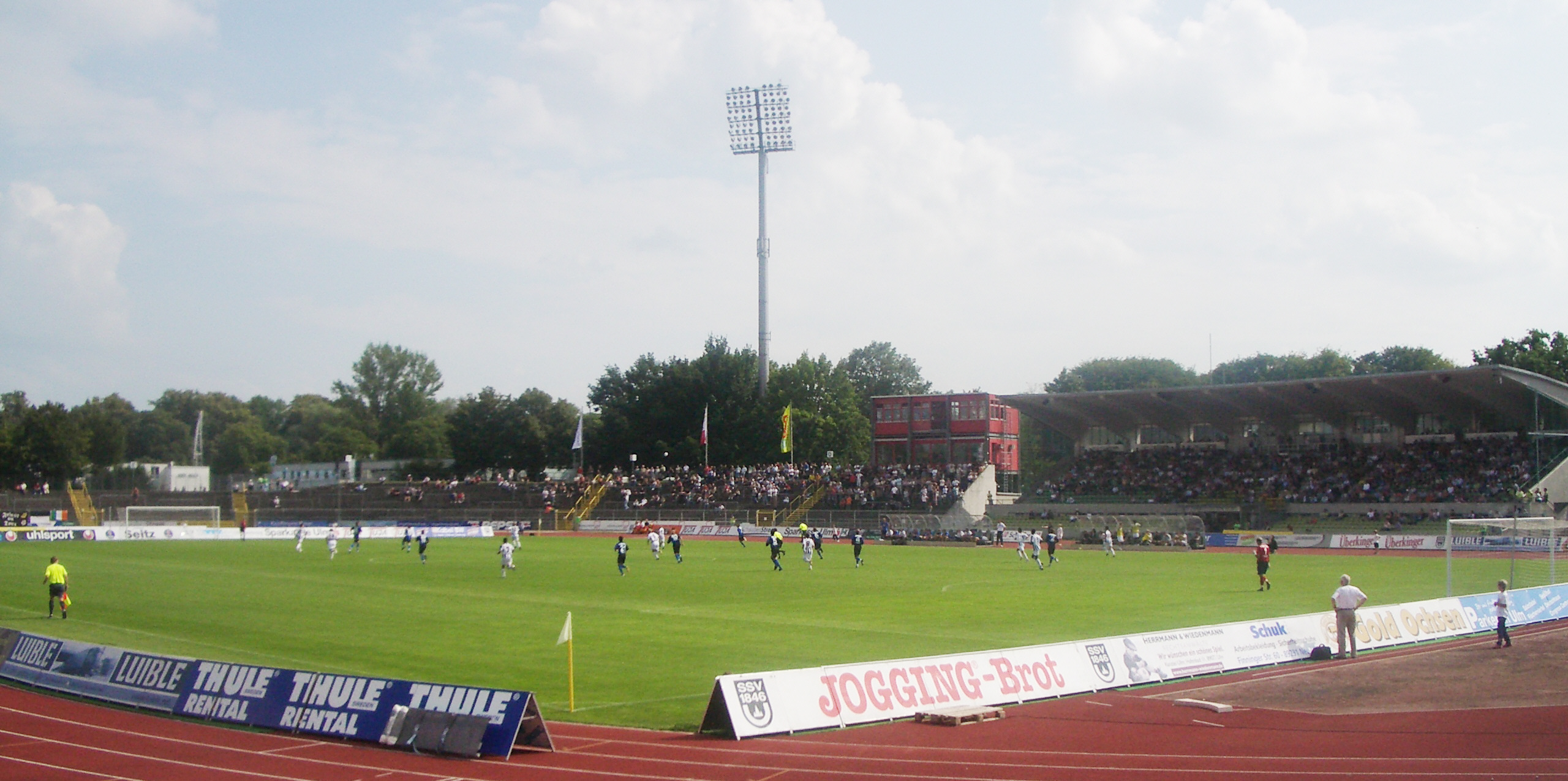
- Donaustadion in Ulm, Germany, the venue of the final

Tournament details
- Host country: Germany
- Dates: 23 June – 7 July
- Teams: 8
- Venues: 5 (in 5 host cities)

Final positions
- Champions: Germany (5th title)
- Runners-up: Sweden

Tournament statistics
- Matches played: 15
- Goals scored: 40 (2.67 per match)
- Attendance: 95,683 (6,379 per match)
- Top scorer(s): (Germany) Claudia Müller (Germany) Sandra Smisek (3 goals each)
- Best player: (Sweden) Hanna Ljungberg

The 2001 UEFA Women's Championship, commonly referred to as the 2001 Women's Euros or just the 2001 Euros, was the eighth UEFA Women's Championship, a competition for the women's national football teams and member associations of UEFA. It took place in Germany between 23 June and 7 July 2001. It was won by Germany for the record-extending fifth time overall and third in a row with a 1–0 win in the final against Sweden, after a golden goal at the end of the final.

== Qualification ==
16 competing teams formed 4 groups; the winners of each group qualified for the Championship, while the teams finishing second and third had to play a playoff in order to qualify.

=== Qualified teams ===
Country	Qualified as	Qualified on	Previous appearances in tournament^{1}
France	Group 1 winner	1 June 2000	1 (1997)
Norway	Group 2 winner	7 May 2000	6 (**1987**, 1989, 1991, **1993**, 1995, 1997)
Germany (hosts)	Group 3 winner	6 April 2000	5 (**1989**,^{2} **1991**, 1993, **1995**, **1997**)
Russia	Group 4 winner	14 June 2000	1 (1997)
Sweden	Play-off winner	5 November 2000	5 (**1984**, 1987, 1989, 1995, 1997)
Denmark	Play-off winner	21 November 2000	4 (1984, 1991, 1993, 1997)
Italy	Play-off winner	22 November 2000	6 (1984, 1987, 1989, 1991, 1993, 1997)
England	Play-off winner	28 November 2000	3 (1984, 1987, 1995)

^{1} Bold indicates champion for that year. Italic indicates host for that year
^{2} As West Germany

== Squads ==
For a list of all squads that played in the final tournament, see UEFA Women's Euro 2001 squads

== Results ==
=== Group stage ===
==== Group A ====
Team	Pld	W	D	L	GF	GA	GD	Pts
Germany	3	3	0	0	11	1	+10	9
Sweden	3	2	0	1	6	3	+3	6
Russia	3	0	1	2	1	7	−6	1
England	3	0	1	2	1	8	−7	1

23 June 2001
14:15

Germany	3–1	Sweden
Müller 42', 65'; Meinert 78'	Report; SvFF Report (in Swedish); DFB Report (in German); Report	Ljungberg 14'

Steigerwaldstadion, Erfurt
Attendance: 10,252
Referee: Katriina Elovirta (Finland)

24 June 2001
17:30

Russia	1–1	England
Svetlitskaya 62'	Report; RFS Report (in Russian); Report	Banks 45'

Ernst-Abbe-Sportfeld, Jena
Attendance: 1,253
Referee: Rita Ruiz Tacoronte (Spain)

27 June 2001
15:00

Germany	5–0	Russia
Wiegmann 43'; Prinz 50'; Meinert 69'; Smisek 73', 89'	Report; DFB Report (in German); RFS Report (in Russian); Report

Steigerwaldstadion, Erfurt
Attendance: 6,249
Referee: Bente Ovedie Skogvang (Norway)

27 June 2001
17:00

Sweden	4–0	England
Törnqvist 3'; Bengtsson 26'; Ljungberg 75'; Eriksson 80'	Report; SvFF Report (in Swedish); Report

Ernst-Abbe-Sportfeld, Jena
Attendance: 1,000
Referee: Claudine Brohet (Belgium)

30 June 2001
14:10

England	0–3	Germany
	Report; DFB Report (in German); Report	Wimbersky 57'; Wiegmann 65'; Lingor 67'

Ernst-Abbe-Sportfeld, Jena
Attendance: 11,312
Referee: Bente Ovedie Skogvang (Norway)

30 June 2001
14:10

Sweden	1–0	Russia
Fagerström 76'	Report; SvFF Report (in Swedish); RFS Report (in Russian); Report

Steigerwaldstadion, Erfurt
Attendance: 820
Referee: Rita Ruiz Tacoronte (Spain)

==== Group B ====
Team	Pld	W	D	L	GF	GA	GD	Pts
Denmark	3	2	0	1	6	5	+1	6
Norway	3	1	1	1	4	2	+2	4
Italy	3	1	1	1	3	4	−1	4
France	3	1	0	2	5	7	−2	3

25 June 2001
17:30

Italy	2–1	Denmark
Panico 12', 72'	Report; DBU Report (in Danish); Report	Bukh 75'

Waldstadion, Aalen
Attendance: 3,193
Referee: Nicole Petignat (Switzerland)

25 June 2001
19:45

Norway	3–0	France
Knudsen 14'; Sykora 18' (o.g.); Mellgren 40'	Report; Report (in French); NFF Report (in Norwegian); Report

Donaustadion, Ulm
Attendance: 3,100
Referee: Wendy Toms (England)

28 June 2001
17:30

France	3–4	Denmark
Pichon 21'; Mugneret-Béghé 27'; Blouin 83'	Report; Report (in French); DBU Report (in Danish); Report	Krogh 15' (pen.), 90'; Bonde 19'; Andersson 71'

Stadion an der Kreuzeiche, Reutlingen
Attendance: 6,600
Referee: Eva Ödlund (Sweden)

28 June 2001
19:45

Norway	1–1	Italy
Mellgren 16'	Report; NFF Report (in Norwegian); Report	Guarino 14'

Stadion an der Kreuzeiche, Reutlingen
Attendance: 6,600
Referee: Elke Fielenbach (Germany)

1 July 2001
16:30

Denmark	1–0	Norway
M. Pedersen 85'	Report; DBU Report (in Danish); NFF Report (in Norwegian); Report

Waldstadion, Aalen
Attendance: 3,480
Referee: Claudine Brohet (Belgium)

1 July 2001
16:30

France	2–0	Italy
Pichon 37'; Jézéquel 74' (pen.)	Report; Report (in French); Report

Donaustadion, Ulm
Attendance: 3,100
Referee: Elke Fielenbach (Germany)

=== Knockout stage ===
Semi-finals
4 July – Ulm
Germany	1
Norway	0
4 July – Ulm
Denmark	0
Sweden	1

Final
7 July – Ulm
Germany (g.g.)	1
Sweden	0

==== Semi-finals ====
4 July 2001
15:05

Germany	1–0	Norway
Smisek 57'	Report; NFF Report (in Norwegian); DFB Report (in German); Report

Donaustadion, Ulm
Attendance: 13,524
Referee: Wendy Toms (England)

4 July 2001
17:30

Denmark	0–1	Sweden
	Report; DBU Report (in Danish); SvFF Report (in Swedish); Report	Nordlund 9'

Donaustadion, Ulm
Attendance: 7,200
Referee: Katriina Elovirta (Finland)

==== Final ====
7 July 2001
15:00

Germany	1–0 (a.e.t./g.g.)	Sweden
Müller 98'	Report; SvFF Report (in Swedish); DFB Report (in German); Report

Donaustadion, Ulm
Attendance: 18,000
Referee: Nicole Petignat (Switzerland)

== Goalscorers ==
3 goals

- (Germany) Claudia Müller
- (Germany) Sandra Smisek

2 goals

- (Denmark) Gitte Krogh
- (France) Marinette Pichon
- (Germany) Maren Meinert
- (Germany) Bettina Wiegmann
- (Italy) Patrizia Panico
- (Norway) Dagny Mellgren
- (Sweden) Hanna Ljungberg

1 goal

- (Denmark) Julie Hauge Andersson
- (Denmark) Christina Bonde
- (Denmark) Julie Rydahl Bukh
- (Denmark) Merete Pedersen
- (England) Angela Banks
- (France) Stéphanie Mugneret-Béghé
- (France) Gaëlle Blouin
- (France) Françoise Jézéquel
- (Germany) Renate Lingor
- (Germany) Birgit Prinz
- (Germany) Petra Wimbersky
- (Italy) Rita Guarino
- (Norway) Monica Knudsen
- (Russia) Alexandra Svetlitskaya
- (Sweden) Kristin Bengtsson
- (Sweden) Sofia Eriksson
- (Sweden) Linda Fagerström
- (Sweden) Tina Nordlund
- (Sweden) Jane Törnqvist

Own goal

- (France) Emmanuelle Sykora (playing against Norway)
