= Maja Åström =

Association football player (born 1982)

Personal information
- Full name: Maja Åström
- Date of birth: 14 December 1982 (age 43)
- Place of birth: Avesta, Sweden
- Height: 1.73 m (5 ft 8 in)
- Position: Goalkeeper

Youth career
- Frösö IF
- Ope IF

Senior career*
Years	Team	Apps	(Gls)
2001–2003	Bälinge IF		
2004–2005	Djurgården/Älvsjö		
2006–2007	Bälinge IF		
2009–2010	AIK	42	(0)
2011–2012	Tyresö FF	0	(0)

International career^{‡}
2001	Sweden	1	(0)
- * Club domestic league appearances and goals as of 23:59, 6 June 2013 (UTC) ‡ National team caps and goals as of 23:59, 6 June 2013 (UTC)

Maja Åström (born 14 December 1982) is a Swedish footballer. She most recently played as a goalkeeper for Damallsvenskan club Tyresö FF and once played for the Sweden women's national football team in 2001.

== Club career ==
Åström played for Djurgården/Älvsjö in the 2005 UEFA Women's Cup Final, where they lost 5–1 on aggregate to Turbine Potsdam.

== International career ==
On 11 March 2001, Åström was capped by the senior Sweden team in a 4–1 Algarve Cup win over Portugal. Following an injury to Sofia Lundgren, Åström was drafted into Sweden's squad for UEFA Women's Euro 2005 as the third choice goalkeeper.

== Personal life ==
Åström is openly lesbian.

== Honours ==
=== Club ===
Djurgården/Älvsjö

- Damallsvenskan (1): 2004
