= Josefin Christensen =

Swedish footballer (born 1982)

Personal information
- Date of birth: 13 October 1982 (age 44)

Senior career*
Years	Team	Apps	(Gls)
- Djurgården/Älvsjö
- Hammarby
- Bollstanäs
- Brommapojkarna

International career
1998	Sweden U16	1	(0)
1999	Sweden U17	7	(1)
1999–2001	Sweden U19	12	(1)
2001–2004	Sweden U21	25	(3)
- * Club domestic league appearances and goals

Josefin Christensen (born 13 October 1982) is a retired Swedish footballer. Christensen was part of the Djurgården Swedish champions' team of 2003.

Christensen played for Sweden in the 2000 UEFA Women's Under-18 Championship.

== Honours ==
=== Club ===
Djurgården/Älvsjö

- Damallsvenskan: 2003
