= Venus James =

American soccer player

Personal information
- Full name: Venus Patrice James
- Date of birth: March 21, 1979 (age 47)
- Place of birth: Oakland, California, US
- Position: Forward

College career
Years	Team	Apps	(Gls)
1997–2000	UCLA Bruins	65	(26)

Senior career*
Years	Team	Apps	(Gls)
2001	Bay Area CyberRays	11	(0)
2002–2003	Carolina Courage	40	(7)
2004–2005	Djurgården/Älvsjö		

International career
1999	United States U21		
- * Club domestic league appearances and goals

Venus Patrice James (born March 21, 1979) is a retired American soccer player. James was part of the Djurgården Swedish champions' team of 2004.

== Career ==
James played for UCLA Bruins while studying at UCLA 1997–2000. After her college career, she played for Bay Area CyberRays and Carolina Courage before joining Djurgården/Älvsjö in 2004. She made her debut for Djurgården/Älvsjö on May 15, 2004, in their 2–0 win against Mallbacken in the 2004 Damallsvenskan.

Venus James was part of the team in Djurgården/Älvsjö's final defeat against Turbine Potsdam in the 2005 UEFA Women's Cup Final. She left Djurgården/Älvsjö after the 2005 season.

== Honors ==
=== Club ===
Djurgården/Älvsjö

- Damallsvenskan: 2004
