= Mauri Holappa =

Finnish footballer and coach (born 1965)

Personal information
- Date of birth: 9 June 1965 (age 61)
- Place of birth: Utajärvi, Finland
- Position: Midfielder

Senior career*
Years	Team	Apps	(Gls)
1982–1986	OPS Oulu		
1987–1988	OTP Oulu		
1989	Haka Valkeakoski		
1990	OTP Oulu		
1991–1992	Kiruna FF		
1993	RoPS		
1994	IFK Luleå		

Managerial career
- 2001: RoPS
- 2012–2014: ONS OULU
- 2015: Djurgården (women)
- 2017: OTP
- * Club domestic league appearances and goals

Mauri Holappa (born 9 June 1965) is a Finnish football coach and former footballer. He played in Veikkausliiga for OTP Oulu and RoPS.

== Playing career ==
Holappa has played for OPS Oulu, OTP Oulu, Haka Valkeakoski, Kiruna FF, Rovaniemi PS and IFK Luleå.

== Coaching career ==
Holappa managed Veikkausliiga team RoPS in 2001.

In December 2014, Holappa was presented as head coach for Djurgårdens IF (women) with Mikael Söderman and Elaine as assistant coaches. Holappa managed to make Djurgården return to Damallsvenskan. Holappa was replaced by Yvonne Ekroth after the 2015 season.
