= Patrik Eklöf =

Swedish footballer and manager

Personal information
- Full name: Karl Johan Patrik Eklöf
- Date of birth: 1 May 1969 (age 57)
- Position: Defender

Senior career*
Years	Team	Apps	(Gls)
1986–1990	Djurgården	11	(0)

International career
1985	Sweden U17	7	(1)
1986	Sweden U19	1	(0)

Managerial career
- Sollentuna United
- 2011–2012: Djurgården (women)
- * Club domestic league appearances and goals

Karl Johan Patrik Eklöf (born 1 May 1969) is a Swedish former football defender. He has also had roles as manager and kit manager.

== Playing career ==
Eklöf was a Swedish youth international, representing the U17 and U19 teams; he played seven matches for the U17 team and scored one goal and made one apperareance for the U19 team. He made 11 Allsvenskan appearances for Djurgårdens IF. In early spring 1987, he injured his knee while playing a Hallsvenskan match against Vasalunds IF, leaving him out for the spring. He left Djurgården after the 1990 season. In total, he made 11 league appearances for the club.

== Post-playing career ==
Leaving Sollentuna United, Eklöf become manager for Djurgårdens IF's women's team before the 2011 season. Eklöf managed the team during the 2011 and 2012 seasons. In late 2019, Eklöf became kit manager for Djurgårdens IF men's team.
