= Sara Johansson (footballer) =

Swedish footballer

Personal information
- Full name: Sara Johansson
- Date of birth: 23 January 1980 (age 46)
- Place of birth: Karlshamn, Sweden
- Height: 1.75 m (5 ft 9 in)
- Position: Forward

Team information
- Current team: Hammarby IF
- Number: 13

Senior career*
Years	Team	Apps	(Gls)
1995–1997	Lörby IF		
1998–1999	Kristianstad/Wä DFF		
2000–2005	Djurgårdens IF (Note: 2003–2005 as Djurgården/Älvsjö.)		
2006–2008	Hammarby IF		

International career
2000–2007	Sweden	26	(7)
- * Club domestic league appearances and goals

Sara Johansson (born 23 January 1980) is a female footballer for Hammarby IF and the Swedish national team.

== Honours ==
=== Club ===
Djurgården/Älvsjö

- Damallsvenskan (2): 2003, 2004
