= Linda Nöjd =

Swedish retired association football player

Personal information
- Date of birth: 29 January 1983 (age 43)

Senior career*
Years	Team	Apps	(Gls)
- Djurgården/Älvsjö
- * Club domestic league appearances and goals

Linda Nöjd (born 29 January 1983) is a retired Swedish footballer. Nöjd was part of the Djurgården Swedish champions' team of 2003. Despite being diagnosed with breast cancer and receiving chemotherapy, Nöjd continued playing football in the second tier of Sweden.

== Honours ==
=== Club ===
Djurgården/Älvsjö

- Damallsvenskan: 2003
