= Jenny Curtsdotter =

Swedish footballer (born 1976)

Personal information
- Date of birth: 16 January 1976 (age 50)
- Position: Defender

Senior career*
Years	Team	Apps	(Gls)
- Mjölby Södra IF
- BK Kenty
2001	Umeå IK		
2002	Älvsjö AIK		
2003–2005	Djurgården/Älvsjö	31	(0)
- Linköpings FC
- * Club domestic league appearances and goals

Jenny Curtsdotter (born 16 January 1976) is a retired Swedish footballer. A three-time Swedish champion, Curtsdotter was part of Umeå IK team of 2001 and of the Djurgården/Älvsjö champions' team of 2003 and 2004. She was considered a defender good in neutralising the opponents offensive players.

== Career ==
Curtsdotter started her career in Mjölby Södra IF. Playing for BK Kenty, she was Östergötland's Women's Player of the Year in 2000. Curtsdotter then continued to Umeå IK before joining Älvsjö AIK in 2002. With Umeå IK, she won the 2001 Damallsvenskan.

When Djurgårdens IF Fotboll and Älvsjö AIK merged in 2002, Curtsdotter continued in the new team Djurgården/Älvsjö, and played 31 matches there and scored 0 goals over three seasons. With Djurgården/Älvsjö, she won the Damallsvenskan on two occasions, in 2003 and 2004. In the 2004 season, she was in the starting eleven in the beginning of the season, but was left out in the latter part due to injuries. In the 2005 UEFA Women's Cup final, she came on as a sub at half-time. After the 2005 Damallsvenskan season, Curtsdotter left Djurgården/Älvsjö to continue in Linköpings FC.

== Honours ==
=== Club ===
Umeå IK

- Damallsvenskan: 2001

Djurgården/Älvsjö

- Damallsvenskan (2): 2003, 2004
