= Marijke Callebaut =

Belgian footballer

Personal information
- Date of birth: 11 August 1980 (age 46)
- Place of birth: Dendermonde, Belgium
- Height: 1.65 m (5 ft 5 in)
- Position: Midfielder

Youth career
- 1986–1990: Schroevers Moorsel

College career
Years	Team	Apps	(Gls)
2001–2004	Lindenwood Lady Lions		

Senior career*
Years	Team	Apps	(Gls)
1990–2000	Eendracht Aalst		
2001	Valur	5	(1)
2002	Tampa Bay Extreme		
2003	Hampton Roads Piranhas		
2003–2005	Djurgården/Älvsjö		
2005–2007	Hammarby		
2008–2009	Djurgården	38	(11)
2010–2011	Anderlecht		
2011–2012	Club Brugge		

International career
1997–2010	Belgium	35	(3)
- * Club domestic league appearances and goals

Marijke Callebaut (born 11 August 1980) is a retired Belgian footballer. Callebaut was part of the Djurgården Swedish champions' team of 2004.

== Honours ==
=== Club ===
Djurgården/Älvsjö

- Damallsvenskan: 2004
