= Djurgårdens IF Fotboll (women) =

Djurgårdens IF
- Full name: Djurgården Idrottsförening Fotbollsförening
- Nicknames: Blåränderna (The Blue Stripes); Järnkaminerna (The Iron Stoves)
- Short name: DIF
- Founded: 1960s; 65 years ago 2003; 23 years ago as 'Djurgården/Älvsjö'
- Ground: Stockholm Olympic Stadium, Stockholm
- Capacity: 14,417
- Chairman: Lars-Erik Sjöberg
- Manager: Anders Johansson & Mikael Widfeldt (interim)
- League: Damallsvenskan
- 2025: 4th
- Website: http://dif.se/damer/
Home colours	Away colours

Djurgårdens IF (Swedish: [ˈjʉ̂ːrˌɡoːɖɛns iːɛf]; formerly known as Djurgården/Älvsjö (Swedish pronunciation: [ˈjʉ̂ːrˌɡoːɖɛn ɛlvɧø]) 2003–2007), commonly known as Djurgården, or (especially locally) Djurgår'n ([ˈjʉ̌ː(r)ɡɔɳ]), is a women's football club from Stockholm, Sweden. The team play their home games at the Stockholm Olympic Stadium and is affiliated to Stockholms Fotbollförbund.

== History ==
=== Start ===
During the 1960s, a women's team representing Djurgårdens IF under the lead of Gösta Sandberg met Öxabäcks IF and won 2–1. In 1969, Djurgården participated in Stockholms FF:s försöksserie, together with IFK Bagarmossen, IK Göta, Gröndals IK, Örby IS, IK Tellus, Tyresö IF, and Vällingby AIK, which Djurgården won without any losses. In 1984 the team was promoted to the then top-tier league Division 1 Norra for the first time. 1985, the debut season in the top-tier ended with a fifth place in the league consisting of AIK, Bälinge IF, Gideonsbergs IF, Hammarby IF, Ope IF, Rönninge SK, Strömsbro IF, Sundsvalls DFF, Sunnanå SK.

In 1988, Djurgården reached Damallsvenskan for the first time by finishing first in Division 1 Norra. In the 1989 season, Djurgården finished fourth in Damallsvenskan and played play-off semi-finals, which they lost on away goals (1–1) to Jitex BK.

After finishing second in the 1991 Damallsvenskan, Djurgården lost again to Jitex BK in the semi-finals of the play-off. The season after, Djurgården got relegated after finishing 11th in Damallsvenskan. Djurgården again won promotion to Damallsvenskan in the 1996 season.

=== Djurgården/Älvsjö merger ===
In 2003, Djurgårdens IF and five-time Swedish champions Älvsjö AIK merged to form Djurgården/Älvsjö, where Djurgården owned 51 percent and Älvsjö AIK 49 percent. The new team consisted of a mix of Djurgården and Älvsjö players, including Swedish footballers Victoria Svensson, Elin Flyborg, Linda Fagerström, Ulrika Björn, and Jane Törnqvist and coached by Thomas Dennerby.

Djurgården/Älvsjö won Damallsvenskan in their first year with a team consisting of Jill Buchwald, Katarina Wicksell, Jane Törnqvist, Therese Brogårde, Jenny Curtsdotter, Helene Nordin, Helen Fagerström, Nadja Gyllander, Sara Thunebro, Josefine Christensen, Ann-Marie Norlin, Malin Nykvist, Linda Fagerström, Tina Kindvall, Jennie Jonsson, Annica Svensson, Linda Nöjd, Victoria Svensson, Elin Flyborg, Sara Johansson, Ulrika Björn, and Jessica Landström.

Djurgården/Älvsjö won Damallsvenskan again in 2004. The team consisted of Maja Åström, Jill Buchwald, Katarina Wicksell, Jane Törnqvist, Therese Brogårde, Jenny Curtsdotter, Helen Fagerström, Nadja Gyllander, Sara Thunebro, Kristin Bengtsson, Emma Liljegren, Ann-Marie Norlin, Malin Nykvist, Linda Fagerström, Jennie Jonsson, Anna Hall, Annica Svensson, Ingrid Bohlin, Marijke Callebaut, Victoria Svensson, Sara Johansson, Venus James, and Jessica Landström.

During the 2004–05 season, the team were runners up in the UEFA Women's Cup after having lost the final against 1. FFC Turbine Potsdam

From the 2007 season, the team competed as Djurgårdens IF. In 2007, the team signed German goalkeeper Nadine Angerer to replace their retiring keeper Bente Nordby.

=== Elitettan (2012–15) ===
In the 2012 Damallsvenskan season, Djurgården finished eleventh and was relegated to Elitettan. In the late 2013, Djurgårdens IF Dam joined the men's football section of Djurgårdens IF Fotboll from having been their own section.

In October 2015, Djurgårdens IF secured a promotion place to the 2016 Damallsvenskan.

=== Damallsvenskan (2016–present) ===
Djurgården remained in Damallsvenskan for the following seasons.

In July 2023, Marcelo Fernández took over as head coach of the team after Magnus Pålsson.

== Stadium ==
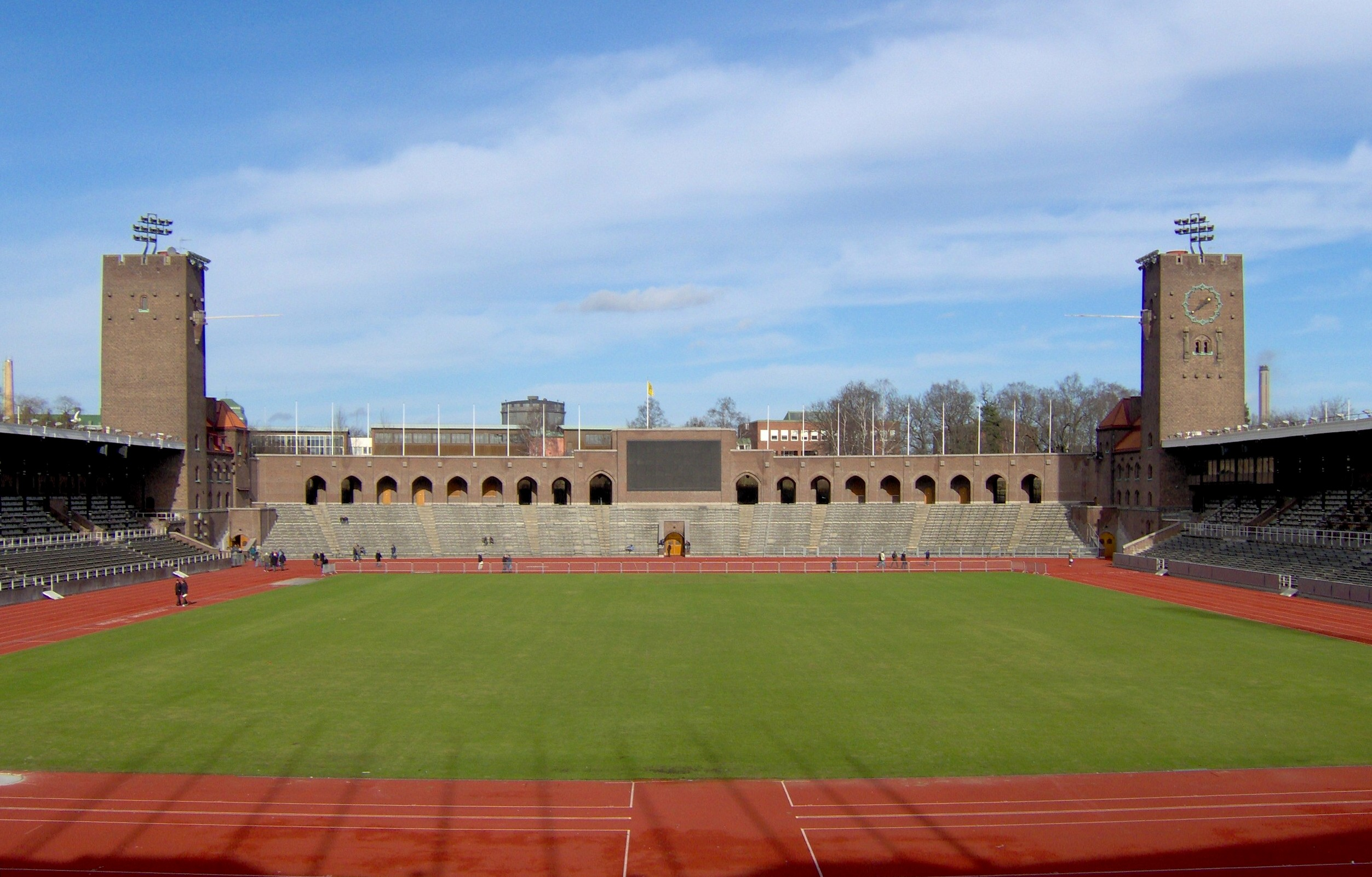
Stockholm Olympic Stadium

Djurgårdens IF play their home games at Stockholm Olympic Stadium. They have also played their matches at Hjorthagens IP, Älvsjö IP, Kristinebergs IP and Östermalms IP.

== Current squad ==
As of 6 September 2026

Note: Flags indicate national team as defined under FIFA eligibility rules; some limited exceptions apply. Players may hold more than one non-FIFA nationality.

No.	Pos.	Nation	Player
2	DF	SWE	Emma Holmqvist
3	MF	GER	Sade Heinrichs
4	DF	FIN	Nanne Ruuskanen
5	DF	SWE	Annika Svensson
7	FW	FIN	Olivia Ulenius
8	MF	SWE	Elsa Pelgander
9	FW	SWE	Johanna Renmark
10	FW	ISL	María Ólafsdóttir Grós
11	MF	NOR	Therese Åsland
12	DF	SWE	Rebecca Jakobsson
13	DF	USA	Camille Ashe
14	FW	SWE	Mimmi Wahlström
15	MF	SWE	Elsa Cleve

No.	Pos.	Nation	Player
17	MF	SWE	Sara Eriksson
18	DF	SWE	Elin Westlund
19	MF	SWE	Lucia Duras
20	FW	NGR	Goodness Osigwe
21	MF	SWE	Meja Staffansson
22	FW	JPN	Maho Hirosawa
23	MF	JPN	Urara Watanabe
24	DF	DEN	Selma Svendsen
25	FW	SWE	Lovis-Esmeralda Bång
27	FW	ISL	Freyja Stefánsdóttir
32	DF	SWE	Fabienne Bartholdson
35	GK	SWE	Moa Öhman
40	GK	SWE	Emilia Redtzer

=== Players out on loan ===
Note: Flags indicate national team as defined under FIFA eligibility rules; some limited exceptions apply. Players may hold more than one non-FIFA nationality.

No.	Pos.	Nation	Player
30	GK	SWE	Elvira Björklund (at Umeå IK until 31 December 2026)

== Managers ==
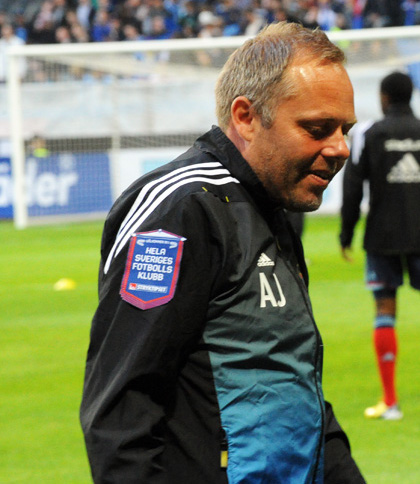
Anders Johansson managed Djurgården in the 2008 and 2009 seasons.

- Gösta Sandberg (1968)
- Claes Bergwall (1969–71)
- Rolf Björk (1972)
- Lasse Björkman (1972)
- Lasse Björkman, Gustav Johansson and Bengt Ståhl (1973)
- Bengt Ståhl (1974)
- Otto Wahlström (1975–76)
- Lars-Magnus Wester (1977–78)
- Marko Tomljenovic and Olle Gustavsson (1979)
- Ulla Bjerkhaug and Olle Gustavsson (1979)
- Ulf Lyfors and Olle Gustavsson (1979)
- Ulf Lyfors and Ulla Bjerkhaug (1980)
- Lennart Ljungqvist (1981–82)
- Jörgen Lindman (1983)
- Kenneth Hedlund (1984–1985)
- Karl-Axel Flygar (1986)
- Peter Carlsson (1987)
- Jörgen Lindman (1988)
- Gordon Rönnberg (1989–91)
- Jan Byheden (1992)
- Ulf Mattsson (1993–94)
- Lennart Ljungqvist and Lennart Bergquist (1995–96)
- Stefan Linder (1997–99)
- Tomas Folkesson (2000)
- Håkan Andersson and Tomas Folkesson (2001)
- Mikael Söderman (2002)
- Thomas Dennerby (2003–04)
- Mikael Söderman (2005)
- Benny Persson (2005–07)
- Anders Johansson (2008–09)
- Daniel Kalles Pettersson (2010)
- Patrik Eklöf (2011–12)
- Marcelo Fernández (2013)
- Carl-Åke Larsen (2014)
- Mauri Holappa (2015)
- Yvonne Ekroth (2016)
- Joel Riddez (2017–2019)
- Pierre Fondin (2019–2021)
- Magnus Pålsson (2021–2023)
- Marcelo Fernández (2023–2025)
- Willie Kirk (2026–present)

== Honours ==
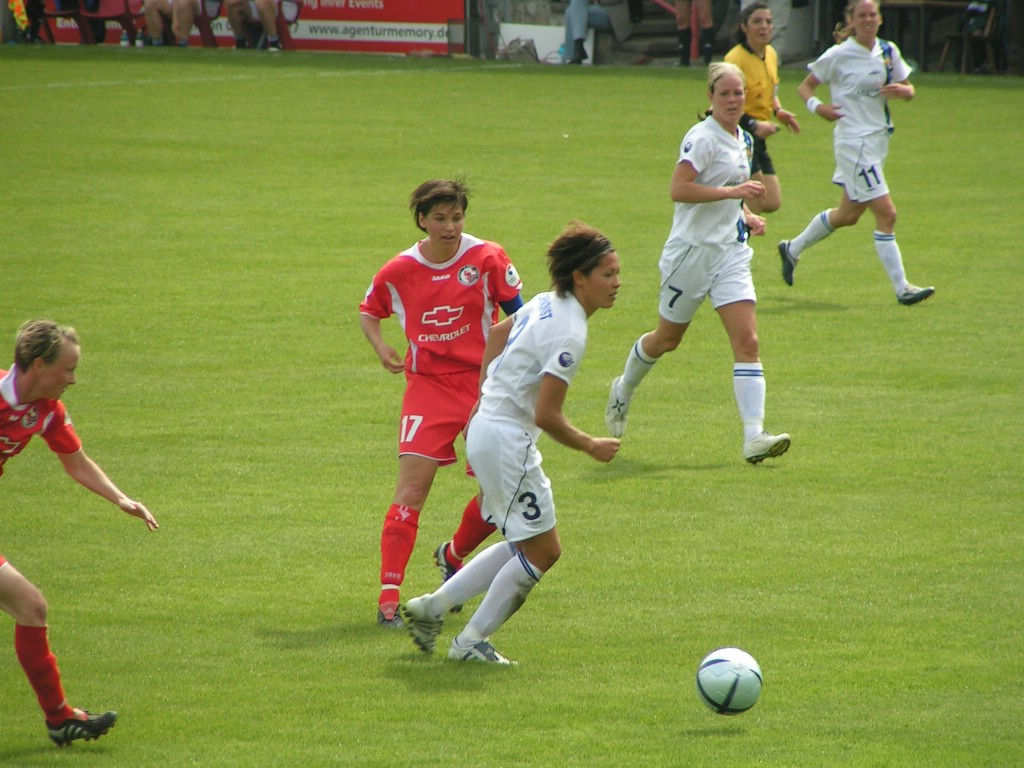
Djurgården/Älvsjö at UEFA-Women's Cup Final 2005 in Potsdam, Germany

=== Domestic ===
==== League ====
- Damallsvenskan:
  - Champions (2): 2003, 2004
  - Runner-up (3): 1991, 2006, 2007
- Division 1 Norra:
  - Winners (2): 1988, 1996
  - Runner-up (1): 1995
- Elitettan:
  - Runner-up (1): 2015

==== Cup ====
- Svenska Cupen:
  - Champions (3): 1999–2000, 2004, 2005
  - Runner-up (3): 1998–99, 2001, 2010

=== European ===
- UEFA Women's Cup/UEFA Women's Champions League:
  - Runner-up (1): 2005

== Record in UEFA competitions ==
All results (away, home and aggregate) list Djurgården Stockholm's goal tally first.

Competition	Round	Club	Away	Home	Aggregate
2004–2005	Second qualifying round	(Greece) Aegina	–	5–0	–
2004–2005	Second qualifying round	(Spain) Athletic Bilbao	–	3–2	–
2004–2005	Second qualifying round	(England) Arsenal	–	0–1	–
2004–2005	Quarter-final	(Sweden) Umeå	1–0	2–1 ^{a}	3–1
2004–2005	Semi-final	(England) Arsenal	1–0	1–1 ^{a}	2–1
2004–2005	Final	(Germany) Turbine Potsdam	1–3	0–2 ^{a}	1–5
2005–2006	Second qualifying round	(Iceland) Valur Reykjavík	–	2–1	–
2005–2006	Second qualifying round	(Kazakhstan) Alma Almaty	–	3–0	–
2005–2006	Second qualifying round	(Serbia) Mašinac Niš	–	7–0	–
2005–2006	Quarter-final	(Czech Republic) Sparta Prague	2–0 ^{a}	0–0	2–0
2005–2006	Semi-final	(Germany) Turbine Potsdam	3–2 ^{a}	2–5	5–7

^{a} First leg.

== Records ==
- Highest attendance: 6,068 vs. Umeå IK (2003)
