= Elin Flyborg =

Swedish footballer (born 1976)

Personal information
- Full name: Elin Maria Flyborg
- Date of birth: 5 October 1976 (age 50)
- Position: Midfielder

Senior career*
Years	Team	Apps	(Gls)
1993–2003	Djurgården/Älvsjö	220	(177)
- IFK Lidingö

International career
1993	Sweden U17	1	(0)
1998–2003	Sweden U23	3	(2)
2000–2003	Sweden	30	(10)
- * Club domestic league appearances and goals

Elin Maria Flyborg (born 5 October 1976) is a retired Swedish footballer. Flyborg was part of the Djurgården/Älvsjö Swedish champions' team of 2003.

Flyborg made her debut for Djurgårdens IF in the 1993 season, which Djurgården played in Division 1 norra, joining from IFK Lidingö, and becoming the internal top scorer in her first season. She played 11 seasons for Djurgården, playing 220 matches and scoring 177 goals. Flyborg then also played for IFK Lidingö.

Elin Flyborg made 30 appearances for Sweden women's national football team and scored ten goals between 2000 and 2003, making her debut on 13 January 2000 in a friendly against Czech Republic women's national football team. She also appeared in Sweden women's national under-17 football team on one occasion in 1998 and in the Sweden women's national under-23 football team three times between 2000 and 2003, scoring two goals.

Flyborg married Swedish footballer and Djurgårdens IF captain Markus Karlsson – both husband and wife were Swedish football champions in the 2003 season. She is the mother of Djurgårdens IF footballer Nea Flyborg.

== Honours ==
=== Club ===
Djurgården/Älvsjö

- Damallsvenskan: 2003
