= Anna Hall (footballer) =

Swedish footballer (born 1979)

Personal information
- Date of birth: 21 April 1979 (age 47)

Youth career
- IFK Täby

Senior career*
Years	Team	Apps	(Gls)
- Djurgården/Älvsjö
- * Club domestic league appearances and goals

Anna Hall (born 21 April 1979) is a retired Swedish footballer. Hall was part of the Djurgården Swedish champions' team of 2004.

== Honours ==
=== Club ===
Djurgården/Älvsjö

- Damallsvenskan: 2004
