= Helen Fagerström =

Swedish footballer

Personal information
- Date of birth: 17 March 1977 (age 49)

Senior career*
Years	Team	Apps	(Gls)
- Djurgården/Älvsjö
- * Club domestic league appearances and goals

Helen Fagerström (born 17 March 1977) is a retired Swedish footballer. Fagerström was part of the Djurgården Swedish champions' team of 2003 and 2004. She was involved in a confrontation with Marta during a football match for which Marta apologised.

== Honours ==
=== Club ===
Djurgården/Älvsjö

- Damallsvenskan (2): 2003, 2004
