= Sara Thunebro =

Swedish footballer (born 1979)

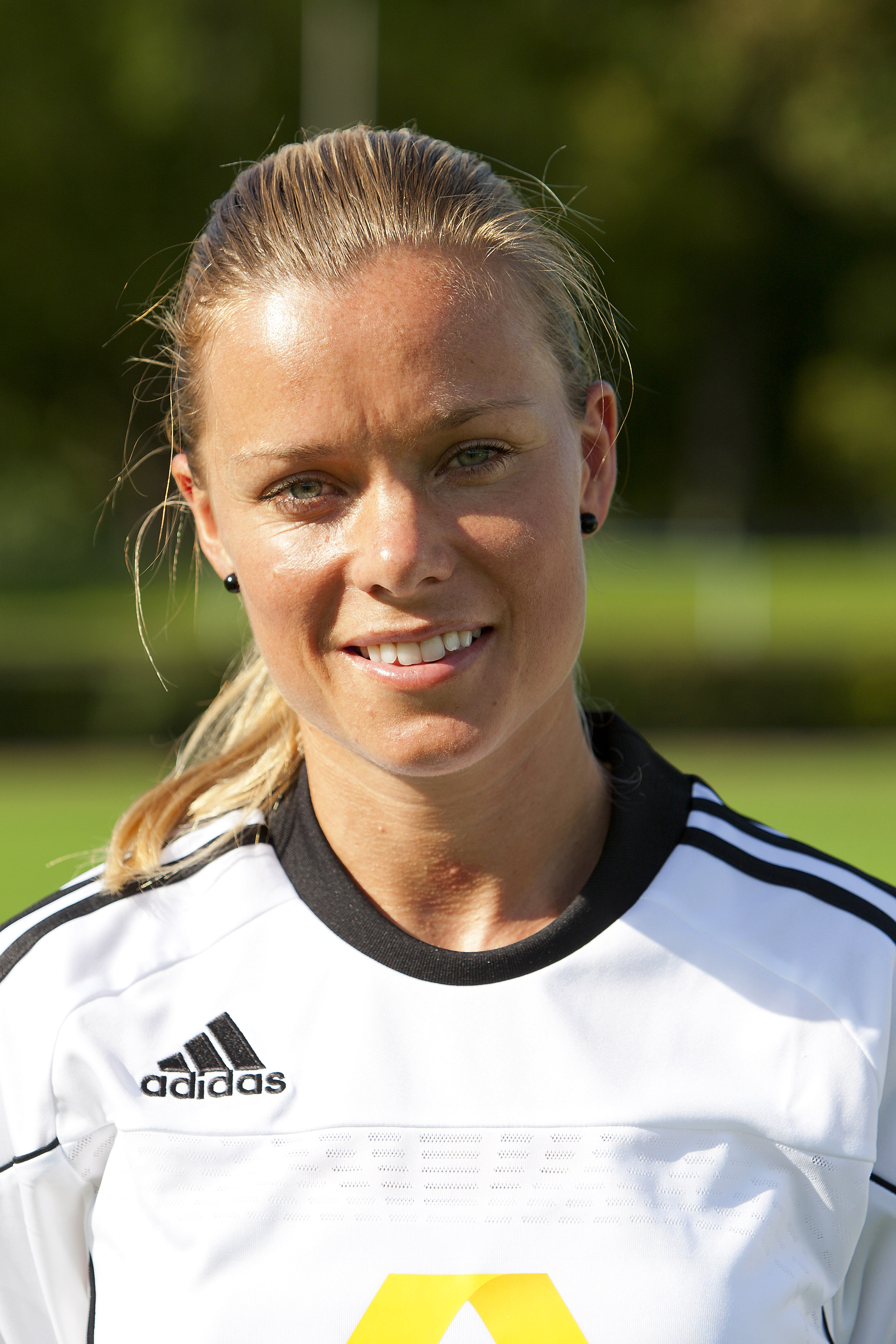
- With FFC Frankfurt in 2011

Personal information
- Full name: Sara Kristina Thunebro
- Date of birth: 26 April 1979 (age 47)
- Place of birth: Strängnäs, Sweden
- Height: 1.65 m (5 ft 5 in)
- Position: Defender

Youth career
- IK Viljan

Senior career*
Years	Team	Apps	(Gls)
1997–1998	Gideonsbergs IF		
1999–2001	Djurgårdens IF		
2002	Älvsjö AIK		
2003–2009	Djurgårdens IF (Note: 2003–2006 as Djurgården/Älvsjö.)	230	(19)
2009–2013	FFC Frankfurt	56	(6)
2013	Tyresö FF	21	(0)
2014–2015	Eskilstuna United DFF	42	(3)

International career^{‡}
1995	Sweden U17	10	(0)
1997–1998	Sweden U19	8	(0)
2004–2015	Sweden	132	(5)
Medal record
Women's football
Representing Sweden
FIFA Women's World Cup
Bronze medal – third place	2011 Germany	Team
- * Club domestic league appearances and goals as of 05:15, 25 June 2015 (UTC) ‡ National team caps and goals as of 17:22, 23 June 2015 (UTC)

Sara Kristina Thunebro (born 26 April 1979) is a Swedish former footballer who was a defender for the Sweden women's national team. At club level Thunebro played for Eskilstuna United DFF, Tyresö FF and Djurgårdens IF of the Damallsvenskan, as well as FFC Frankfurt of the Frauen-Bundesliga. Making her international debut in 2004, Thunebro won 132 caps and represented her country at the 2009 and 2013 editions of the UEFA Women's Championship. She also played at the 2007, 2011 and 2015 FIFA Women's World Cups, as well as the 2008 and 2012 Olympic football tournaments. An attacking left-back, her trademark on the field was her white headband.

== Club career ==
Thunebro began playing at the age of six, eventually rising to the youth club IK Viljan. She advanced through the Damallsvenskan to one of the top-tier teams Djurgårdens IF. With Thunebro on the team, Djurgården won the Swedish Championship in 2003 and 2004. Djurgården also won the Swedish Cup in both 2004 and 2005, securing qualification for the UEFA Women's Cup. In 2005 Djurgården reached the final but were beaten by Turbine Potsdam.

After twice being voted the best defender in Sweden, Thunebro joined FFC Frankfurt in 2009. She extended her contract with the German club for another two years in April 2011.

After playing only three games in the first half of the season she left Frankfurt in March 2013 to join Tyresö FF in Sweden. She aimed to get more match practice ahead of the UEFA Women's Euro 2013 in her home country.

After one season at Tyresö she moved on again, to newly promoted Damallsvenskan club Eskilstuna United DFF. In announcing the transfer in December 2013, Thunebro admitted she moved to be based closer to her family. After the 2015 season in which Eskilstuna finished as runners-up to FC Rosengård, Thunebro made the difficult decision to retire from playing. Coach Viktor Eriksson thanked Thunebro for her part in establishing the club in the top league and described it as an honour to have worked with her for two years.

== International career ==
A 3–0 defeat to the United States in January 2004 was Thunebro's first appearance for the senior Swedish national team. She had already collected 32 caps at Under-23 level, eight at Under-19 and 10 at Under-17. She remained on the fringes of the squad but was left out of the selection for UEFA Women's Euro 2005. Thunebro travelled to China for the 2007 FIFA Women's World Cup but made just one appearance during Sweden's exit at the group stage. Returning to China for the following year's Olympic football tournament, Thunebro had become a regular starter in the team which reached the quarter-finals.

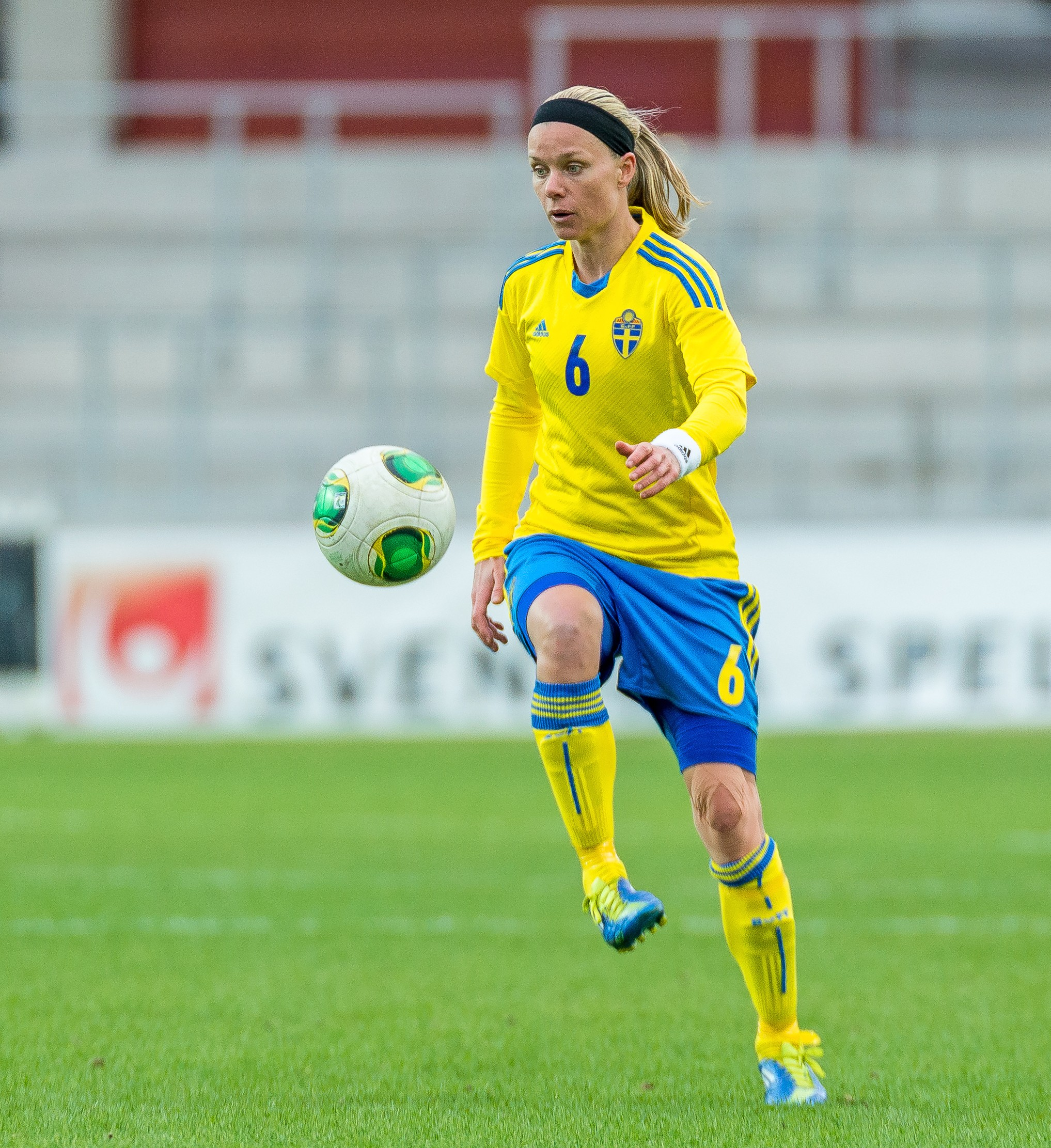
Thunebro playing for Sweden in 2013

By 2009 Thunebro was an important part of an in–form Swedish team who were enjoying victories over Germany, Brazil and the United States. "Each year I've taken small steps forward," she explained. "I feel in great form now, but I haven't reached my peak yet." At UEFA Women's Euro 2009 Sweden reached the quarter-finals only to be eliminated by Norway.

At the 2011 FIFA Women's World Cup in Germany Thunebro won a bronze medal with Sweden, who were beaten by eventual winners Japan in the semi-final. Third place secured Sweden's qualification for the 2012 Olympic football tournament in London. In September 2011 Thunebro announced her intention to retire from international football after the UEFA Women's Euro 2013 tournament in her home country.

After the tournament, Thunebro relented and was selected by national coach Pia Sundhage for Sweden's 2015 FIFA Women's World Cup qualification campaign. In May 2015, Thunebro and Eskilstuna team-mates Olivia Schough and Malin Diaz were confirmed in Sundhage's Sweden squad for the 2015 FIFA Women's World Cup in Canada.

Following Sweden's second round elimination in Canada Thunebro quit international football. She had received only 15 minutes of playing time as the team failed to win any of their four matches at the tournament. Thunebro felt that she no longer had coach Sundhage's confidence and did not want to sit on the substitute's bench to make up the numbers.

=== Matches and goals scored at World Cup & Olympic tournaments ===
Key (expand for notes on "world cup and olympic goals")
Location	Geographic location of the venue where the competition occurred
Lineup	Start – played entire match on minute (off player) – substituted on at the minute indicated, and player was substituted off at the same time off minute (on player) – substituted off at the minute indicated, and player was substituted on at the same time (c) – captain
Min	The minute in the match the goal was scored. For list that include caps, blank indicates played in the match but did not score a goal.
Assist/pass	The ball was passed by the player, which assisted in scoring the goal. This column depends on the availability and source of this information.
penalty or pk	Goal scored on penalty-kick which was awarded due to foul by opponent. (Goals scored in penalty-shoot-out, at the end of a tied match after extra-time, are not included.)
Score	The match score after the goal was scored.
Result	The final score. W – match was won L – match was lost to opponent D – match was drawn (W) – penalty-shoot-out was won after a drawn match (L) – penalty-shoot-out was lost after a drawn match
aet	The score at the end of extra-time; the match was tied at the end of 90' regulation
pso	Penalty-shoot-out score shown in parentheses; the match was tied at the end of extra-time
	Pink background color – Olympic women's football tournament
	Blue background color – FIFA women's world cup final tournament

Goal	Match	Date	Location	Opponent	Lineup	Min	Score	Result	Competition
China 2007 FIFA Women's World Cup
	1	2007-9-11	Chengdu	Nigeria	Start			1–1 D	Group match
	2	2007-9-18	Tianjin	North Korea	on 40' (off Ljungberg) off 89' (on Lundin)			2–1 W	Group match
(China) Beijing 2008 Women's Olympic Football Tournament
	3	2008-8-6	Tianjin	China	Start			1–2 L	Group match
	4	2008-8-9	Tianjin	Argentina	Start			1–0 W	Group match
	5	2008-8-12	Beijing	Canada	off 86' (on Paulson)			2–1 W	Group match
	6	2008-8-15	Shenyang	Germany	Start			0–2 L	Quarter-Final
Germany 2011 FIFA Women's World Cup
	7	2011-6-28	Leverkusen	Colombia	Start			1–0 W	Group match
	8	2011-7-2	Augsburg	North Korea	Start			1–0 W	Group match
	9	2011-7-6	Wolfsburg	United States	Start			2–1 W	Group match
	10	2011-7-10	Augsburg	Australia	Start			3–1 W	Quarter-Final
	11	2011-7-13	Frankfurt	Japan	Start			1–3 L	Semi-Final
	12	2011-7-16	Sinsheim	France	Start			2–1 W	Third Place Match
(United Kingdom) London 2012 Women's Olympic Football Tournament
	13	2012-7-25	Coventry	South Africa	Start			4–1 W	Group match
	14	2012-7-28	Coventry	Japan	Start			0–0 D	Group match
	15	2012-7-31	Newcastle	Canada	Start			2–2 D	Group match
	16	2012-8-3	Glasgow	France	Start			1–2 L	Quarter-Final
Canada 2015 FIFA Women's World Cup
	17	2015-6-16	Edmonton	Australia	on 76' (off Rubensson)			1–1 D	Group match

=== Matches and goals scored at European Championship tournaments ===
Goal	Match	Date	Location	Opponent	Lineup	Min	Score	Result	Competition
(Finland) 2009 European Championship
	1	2009-8-25	Turku	Russia	Start			3–0 W	Group match
	2	2009-8-28	Turku	Italy	Start			2–0 W	Group match
	3	2009-8-31	Turku	England	Start			1–1 D	Group match
	4	2009-9-4	Helsinki	Norway	Start			1–3 L	Quarter-Final
(Sweden) 2013 European Championship
	5	2013-7-10	Gothenburg	Denmark	Start			1–1 D	Group match
	6	2013-7-13	Gothenburg	Finland	Start			5–0 W	Group match
	7	2013-7-16	Halmstad	Italy	off 79' (on Schough)			3–1 W	Group match
	8	2013-7-21	Halmstad	Iceland	Start			4–0 W	Quarter-Final
	9	2013-7-24	Gothenburg	Germany	Start			0–1 L	Semi-Final

== International goals ==
No.	Date	Venue	Opponent	Score	Result	Competition
1.	2 October 2004	Hietalahti Stadium, Vaasa, Finland	Finland	1–0	1–1	UEFA Women's Euro 2005 qualifying
2.	26 August 2006	Laugardalsvöllur, Reykjavík, Iceland	Iceland	2–0	4–0	2007 FIFA Women's World Cup qualification
3.	25 April 2009	Gamla Ullevi, Gothenburg, Sweden	Brazil	1–1	3–1	Friendly
4.	6 March 2013	Stadium Bela Vista, Parchal, Portugal	China	1–1	1–1	2013 Algarve Cup
5.	8 March 2013	Municipal Stadium, Albufeira, Portugal	Iceland	2–0	6–1	2013 Algarve Cup

== Personal life ==
Thunebro enjoys playing golf and rides a motorcycle. Throughout her career she did not employ an agent. Part of the reason she wore her trademark headband was to allow her grandmother to easily identify her while watching on the television.

== Honours ==
=== Club ===
Djurgården/Älvsjö

- Damallsvenskan (2): 2003, 2004
- Svenska Cupen (3): 1999–00, 2004, 2005

FFC Frankfurt

- DFB-Pokal (1): 2011

=== Country ===
Sweden

- 2007 FIFA Women's World Cup: Group stage
- 2011 FIFA Women's World Cup: Third place
- 2015 FIFA Women's World Cup: Round of 16
- 2004 Summer Olympics in Athens: Fourth place
- 2008 Summer Olympics in Beijing: Quarter-final
- 2012 Summer Olympics in London: Quarter-final
- UEFA Women's Euro 2009: Quarter-final
- UEFA Women's Euro 2013: Semi-finals
- Algarve Cup (Participated from 2004 to 2015): Winner 2009

Sweden U19

- UEFA Women's Under-19 Championship: Semi-Finalists 1998

=== Individual ===
- Swedish Defender of the Year: 2008, 2009
