= Malin Nykvist =

Swedish footballer

Personal information
- Date of birth: 19 May 1979 (age 47)

Senior career*
Years	Team	Apps	(Gls)
- Djurgården/Älvsjö
- * Club domestic league appearances and goals

Malin Nykvist (born 19 May 1979) is a retired Swedish footballer. Nykvist was part of the Djurgården Swedish champions' team of 2003 and 2004.

== Honours ==
=== Club ===
Djurgården/Älvsjö

- Damallsvenskan (2): 2003, 2004
