= Älta IF =

Swedish football club

- Full name: Älta Idrottsförening
- Founded: 1941
- Ground: Älta IP; Älta; Sweden
- Chairman: Arne Sköldén
- Head coach: Richard Karlsson
- League: Division 3 Södra Svealand
- 2012: Division 4 Stockholm Mellersta, 1st
| Home colours | Away colours |

Älta IF is a Swedish football club located in Älta.

== Background ==
Älta IF currently plays in Division 4 Stockholm Södra which is the sixth tier of Swedish football. They play their home matches at the Älta IP in Älta.

The club is affiliated to Stockholms Fotbollförbund.

== Season to season ==
| Season | Level | Division | Section | Position | Movements |
|---|---|---|---|---|---|
| 1993 | Tier 5 | Division 4 | Stockholm Mellersta | 5th | |
| 1994 | Tier 5 | Division 4 | Stockholm Mellersta | 8th | |
| 1995 | Tier 5 | Division 4 | Stockholm Mellersta | 2nd | Promotion Playoffs |
| 1996 | Tier 5 | Division 4 | Stockholm Mellersta | 3rd | |
| 1997 | Tier 5 | Division 4 | Stockholm Mellersta | 2nd | Promotion Playoffs – Promoted |
| 1998 | Tier 4 | Division 3 | Östra Svealand | 1st | Promoted |
| 1999 | Tier 3 | Division 2 | Östra Svealand | 7th | |
| 2000 | Tier 3 | Division 2 | Östra Svealand | 11th | Relegated |
| 2001 | Tier 4 | Division 3 | Östra Svealand | 8th | |
| 2002 | Tier 4 | Division 3 | Östra Svealand | 9th | Relegation Playoffs |
| 2003 | Tier 4 | Division 3 | Östra Svealand | 9th | Relegation Playoffs |
| 2004 | Tier 4 | Division 3 | Östra Svealand | 10th | Relegated |
| 2005 | Tier 5 | Division 4 | Stockholm Mellersta | 5th | |
| 2006* | Tier 6 | Division 4 | Stockholm Mellersta | 2nd | Promotion Playoffs |
| 2007 | Tier 6 | Division 4 | Stockholm Södra | 3rd | |
| 2008 | Tier 6 | Division 4 | Stockholm Södra | 3rd | |
| 2009 | Tier 6 | Division 4 | Stockholm Södra | 8th | |
| 2010 | Tier 6 | Division 4 | Stockholm Södra | 4th | |
| 2011 | Tier 6 | Division 4 | Stockholm Södra | 2nd | Promotion Playoffs |
| 2012 | Tier 6 | Division 4 | Stockholm Mellersta | 1st | Promoted |

* League restructuring in 2006 resulted in a new division being created at Tier 3 and subsequent divisions dropping a level.
