= Linda Fagerström =

Swedish footballer (born 1977)

Personal information
- Full name: Anna Linda Christine Fagerström
- Date of birth: 17 March 1977 (age 49)
- Place of birth: Upplands Väsby, Sweden
- Height: 1.68 m (5 ft 6 in)
- Position: Midfielder

Senior career*
Years	Team	Apps	(Gls)
- Bälinge
- Hammarby
2001–2002	Älvsjö AIK		
2003–2006	Djurgården/Älvsjö		
2007–2011	Bollstanäs		

International career
1997–2006	Sweden	97	(7)
- * Club domestic league appearances and goals

Anna Linda Christine Fagerström (born 17 March 1977) is a Swedish former football midfielder who played for Bälinge IF, Hammarby IF and Djurgården/Älvsjö in the Damallsvenskan and Bollstanäs SK in Division 1.

== Career ==
With Djurgården she played the 2005 European Cup's final.

She was a member of the Swedish national team, playing the 1999 and 2003 World Cups and the 2000 and 2004 Summer Olympics. She made her senior debut against Norway in February 1997 after 17 caps at Under–21 level. Fagerström also competed for Sweden at the 2001 European Championship, scoring the winning goal against Russia on the final day of group play to send her team on to the Semi-Finals.

== Career statistics ==
=== International ===
Scores and results list Sweden's goal tally first, score column indicates score after each Fagerström goal.

List of international goals scored by Linda Fagerström
No.	Date	Venue	Opponent	Score	Result	Competition	Ref.
1	June 30, 2001	Erfurt, Germany	Russia	1–0	1–0	UEFA Women's Euro 2001	

== Honours ==
=== Club ===
Djurgården/Älvsjö

- Damallsvenskan (2): 2003, 2004
