= List of UEFA Women's Championship goalscorers =

List of goal scorers at top European football (soccer) competition

The UEFA European Women's Championship, also called the UEFA Women's Euro, held every four years, is the main competition in women's association football between national teams of the UEFA confederation. The competition is the women's equivalent of the UEFA European Championship.

This article lists the goal scorers at the UEFA European Women's Championship.

== Overall top goalscorers ==
=== All-time top scorers ===
Rank	Player	Euro															Total
Rank	Player	1984	(Norway) 1987	(West Germany) 1989	(Denmark) 1991	(Italy) 1993	1995	(Norway) (Sweden) 1997	(Germany) 2001	(England) 2005	(Finland) 2009	(Sweden) 2013	(Netherlands) 2017	(England) 2022	(Switzerland) 2025	(Germany) 2029	Total
1	(Germany) Inka Grings									4	6						10
1	(Germany) Birgit Prinz						2	2	1	3	2						10
3	(Italy) Carolina Morace	2	1	0	0	1		4									8
3	(Germany) Heidi Mohr			1	4	1	2										8
3	(Sweden) Lotta Schelin									0	1	5	2				8
6	(England) Beth Mead													6	1		7
7	(Sweden) Stina Blackstenius												2	1	3		6
7	(Sweden) Hanna Ljungberg							1	2	3							6
7	(Germany) Alexandra Popp													6			6
7	(England) Alessia Russo													4	2		6
11	(Sweden) Kosovare Asllani										1	1	0	1	2		5
11	(Italy) Melania Gabbiadini									2	1	2	0				5
11	(Spain) Esther González												0	1	4		5
11	(Norway) Solveig Gulbrandsen								0	3	0	2					5
11	(Germany) Maren Meinert					1	1	1	2								5
11	(Netherlands) Vivianne Miedema												4	0	1		5
11	(Italy) Patrizia Panico							1	2	0	2	0					5
11	(Sweden) Pia Sundhage	4	0	1			0										5
11	(England) Jodie Taylor												5				5
11	(Sweden) Lena Videkull	0	1	1			3										5
11	(Germany) Bettina Wiegmann				0	0	2	1	2								5

=== Top scorers by tournament ===
Year	Player(s)	Maximum matches	Goals
1984	(Sweden) Pia Sundhage	4	4
1987	(Norway) Trude Stendal	2	3
1989	(Norway) Sissel Grude (West Germany) Ursula Lohn	2	2
1991	(Germany) Heidi Mohr	2	4
1993	(Denmark) Susan Mackensie	2	2
1995	(Sweden) Lena Videkull	3	3
1997	(Italy) Carolina Morace (Norway) Marianne Pettersen (France) Angélique Roujas	5	4
2001	(Germany) Claudia Müller (Germany) Sandra Smisek	5	3
2005	(Germany) Inka Grings	5	4
2009	(Germany) Inka Grings	6	6
2013	(Sweden) Lotta Schelin	6	5
2017	(England) Jodie Taylor	6	5
2022	(England) Beth Mead (Germany) Alexandra Popp	6	6
2025	(Spain) Esther González	6	4
2029			

== Goalscorers by countries ==
Numbers in green means the player finished as the tournament top scorer (or joint top scorer). Years outlined in red indicate host nation status.

=== Austria ===
Player	Goals	2017	2022
Nina Burger	2	2	
Nicole Billa	1		1
Stefanie Enzinger	1	1	
Lisa Makas	1	1	
Katharina Naschenweng	1		1
Katharina Schiechtl	1		1
Sarah Zadrazil	1	1	
Total	8	5	3

=== Belgium ===
Player	Goals	2017	2022	2025
Janice Cayman	3	1	1	1
Justine Vanhaevermaet	2		1	1
Tessa Wullaert	2	1		1
Tine De Caigny	1		1	
Elke Van Gorp	1	1		
Hannah Eurlings	1			1
Total	10	3	3	4

=== Denmark ===
Player	Goals	1984	1991	1993	1997	2001	2005	2009	2013	2017	2022	2025
Merete Pedersen	3				1	1	1					
Johanna Rasmussen	3						1	1	1			
Mia Brogaard	2								2			
Pernille Harder	2									1	1	
Mariann Knudsen	2								2			
Gitte Krogh	2					2						
Susan Mackensie	2			2								
Nadia Nadim	2									2		
Cathrine Paaske-Sørensen	2						2					
Julie Hauge Andersson	1					1						
Christina Bonde	1					1						
Inge Hindkjær	1	1										
Helle Jensen	1		1									
Bonny Madsen	1		1									
Theresa Nielsen	1									1		
Hanne Nissen	1			1								
Maiken Pape	1							1				
Julie Rydahl Bukh	1					1						
Camilla Sand Andersen	1							1				
Lene Terp	1				1							
Sanne Troelsgaard Nielsen	1									1		
Katrine Veje	1									1		
Signe Bruun	1											1
Janni Thomsen	1											1
Amalie Vangsgaard	1											1
Total	36	1	2	3	2	6	4	3	5	6	1	3

=== England ===
Player	Goals	1984	1987	1995	2001	2005	2009	2013	2017	2022	2025
Beth Mead	7									6	1
Alessia Russo	6									4	2
Jodie Taylor	5								5		
Eniola Aluko	4						3	1			
Georgia Stanway	4									2	2
Ella Toone	4									2	2
Karen Carney	3					1	2				
Toni Duggan	3							1	2		
Fran Kirby	3								1	2	
Kelly Smith	3						3				
Ellen White	3								1	2	
Fara Williams	3					1	2				
Michelle Agyemang	2										2
Lucy Bronze	2									1	1
Linda Curl	2	2									
Karen Farley	2			2							
Lauren Hemp	2									1	1
Lauren James	2										2
Chloe Kelly	2									1	1
Debbie Bampton	1	1									
Angela Banks	1				1						
Amanda Barr	1					1					
Laura Bassett	1							1			
Aggie Beever-Jones	1										1
Gillian Coultard	1		1								
Kerry Davis	1		1								
Elizabeth Deighan	1	1									
Jordan Nobbs	1								1		
Nikita Parris	1								1		
Jill Scott	1						1				
Marieanne Spacey	1		1								
Keira Walsh	1										1
Faye White	1						1				
Own goals	2					1				1	
Total	78	4	3	2	1	4	12	3	11	22	16

Own goals scored for opponents

- Louisa Waller (scored for Germany in 1995)
- Millie Bright (scored for the Netherlands in 2017)

=== Finland ===
Player	Goals	2005	2009	2013	2022	2025
Laura Österberg Kalmari	4	2	2			
Linda Sällström	2		1		1	
Annica Sjölund	2		1	1		
Heidi Kackur	1	1				
Katariina Kosola	1					1
Natalia Kuikka	1					1
Minna Mustonen	1	1				
Anna-Kaisa Rantanen	1	1				
Maija Saari	1		1			
Oona Sevenius	1					1
Total	15	5	5	1	1	3

Own goals scored for opponents

- Sanna Valkonen (scored for England in 2005)
- Eva Nyström (scored for Norway in 2025)

=== France ===
Player	Goals	1997	2001	2005	2009	2013	2017	2022	2025
Grace Geyoro	5							3	2
Marinette Pichon	4		2	2					
Angélique Roujas	4	4							
Camille Abily	3				2		1		
Delphine Cascarino	3							1	2
Marie-Antoinette Katoto	3							1	2
Eugénie Le Sommer	3					2	1		
Louisa Nécib	3				1	2			
Marie-Laure Delie	2					2			
Kadidiatou Diani	2							1	1
Stéphanie Mugneret-Béghé	2		1	1					
Wendie Renard	2					2			
Sandy Baltimore	1								1
Gaëlle Blouin	1		1						
Sonia Bompastor	1				1				
Amandine Henry	1						1		
Françoise Jezequel	1		1						
Sakina Karchaoui	1								1
Hoda Lattaf	1			1					
Amel Majri	1								1
Melvine Malard	1							1	
Clara Mateo	1								1
Griedge Mbock Bathy	1							1	
Ève Périsset	1							1	
Gaëtane Thiney	1				1				
Sandie Toletti	1								1
Own goals	1							1	
Total	51	4	5	4	5	8	3	10	12

Own goals scored for opponents

- Cécile Locatelli (scored for Sweden in 1997)
- Emmanuelle Sykora (scored for Norway in 2001)
- Selma Bacha (scored for Netherlands in 2025)

=== Germany ===
Successor team of West Germany (1989).

Player	Goals	1989	1991	1993	1995	1997	2001	2005	2009	2013	2017	2022	2025	2029
Birgit Prinz	10				2	2	1	3	2					
Inka Grings	10							4	6					
Heidi Mohr	8	1	4	1	2									
Alexandra Popp	6											6		
Maren Meinert	5			1	1	1	2							
Bettina Wiegmann	5				2	1	2							
Fatmire Alushi	3								3					
Simone Laudehr	3								2	1				
Renate Lingor	3						1	2						
Lina Magull	3											3		
Anja Mittag	3							1	1	1				
Claudia Müller	3						3							
Conny Pohlers	3							3						
Célia Šašić	3								1	2				
Lea Schüller	3											1	2	
Sandra Smisek	3						3							
Melanie Behringer	2								2					
Jule Brand	2												2	
Linda Bresonik	2								2					
Ursula Lohn	2	2												
Dzsenifer Marozsán	2									1	1			
Sandra Minnert	2					1		1						
Silvia Neid	2	1	1											
Sjoeke Nüsken	2												2	
Babett Peter	2										2			
Nicole Anyomi	1											1		
Patricia Brocker	1				1									
Klara Bühl	1											1		
Angelika Fehrmann	1	1												
Josephine Henning	1										1			
Steffi Jones	1							1						
Isabel Kerschowski	1										1			
Sophia Kleinherne	1											1		
Annike Krahn	1								1					
Kim Kulig	1								1					
Lena Lattwein	1											1		
Lena Lotzen	1									1				
Monika Meyer	1					1								
Sissy Raith	1		1											
Petra Wimbersky	1						1							
Own goals	1				1									
Total	108	5	6	2	9	6	13	15	21	6	5	14	6	

Own goals scored for opponents

- Merle Frohms (scored for France in 2022)

=== Iceland ===
Player	Goals	2009	2013	2017	2022	2025
Dagný Brynjarsdóttir	2		1		1	
Hlín Eiríksdóttir	1					1
Fanndís Friðriksdóttir	1			1		
Sveindís Jane Jónsdóttir	1					1
Hólmfríður Magnúsdóttir	1	1				
Berglind Björg Þorvaldsdóttir	1				1	
Margrét Lára Vidarsdóttir	1		1			
Glódís Perla Viggósdóttir	1					1
Karólína Lea Vilhjálmsdóttir	1				1	
Total	10	1	2	1	3	3

=== Italy ===
Player	Goals	1984	1987	1989	1991	1993	1997	2001	2005	2009	2013	2017	2022	2025
Carolina Morace	8	2	1			1	4							
Melania Gabbiadini	5								2	1	2			
Patrizia Panico	5						1	2		2				
Cristiana Girelli	4											1		3
Ilaria Mauro	3										1	2		
Elisabetta Vignotto	3	1	1	1										
Silvia Fiorini	2				1		1							
Daniela Sabatino	2											2		
Valentina Bergamaschi	1												1	
Barbara Bonansea	1													1
Elisa Camporese	1								1					
Antonella Carta	1						1							
Arianna Caruso	1													1
Sara Di Filippo	1								1					
Feriana Ferraguzzi	1			1										
Rita Guarino	1							1						
Elisabetta Oliviero	1													1
Martina Piemonte	1												1	
Alessia Tuttino	1									1				
Tatiana Zorri	1									1				
Total	44	3	2	2	1	1	7	3	4	5	3	5	2	6

Own goals scored for opponents

- Raffaella Manieri (scored for Sweden in 2013)

=== Netherlands ===
Player	Goals	2009	2013	2017	2022	2025
Vivianne Miedema	5			4		1
Lieke Martens	3			3		
Victoria Pelova	3				1	2
Sherida Spitse	3			3		
Daniëlle van de Donk	2			1	1	
Romée Leuchter	2				2	
Kirsten van de Ven	2	2				
Esmee Brugts	1					1
Damaris Egurrola	1				1	
Stefanie van der Gragt	1				1	
Manon Melis	1	1				
Marlous Pieëte	1	1				
Jill Roord	1				1	
Shanice van de Sanden	1			1		
Sylvia Smit	1	1				
Karin Stevens	1	1				
Own goals	3			1	1	1
Total	32	6	0	13	8	5

=== Northern Ireland ===
Player	Goals	2022
Julie Nelson	1	1
Total	1	1

Own goals scored for opponents

- Kelsie Burrows (scored for England in 2022)

=== Norway ===
Player	Goals	1987	1989	1991	1993	1995	1997	2001	2005	2009	2013	2017	2022	2025
Solveig Gulbrandsen	5								3		2			
Dagny Mellgren	4							2	2					
Marianne Pettersen	4						4							
Ada Hegerberg	3										1			2
Isabell Herlovsen	3								2	1				
Frida Maanum	3												1	2
Trude Stendal	3	3												
Ann Kristin Aarønes	2					2								
Marit Fiane Christensen	2								1		1			
Signe Gaupset	2													2
Caroline Graham Hansen	2												1	1
Sissel Grude	2		2											
Birthe Hegstad	2			1	1									
Lise Klaveness	2								2					
Linda Medalen	2		1			1								
Cecilie Pedersen	2									2				
Heidi Støre	2	1					1							
Julie Blakstad	1												1	
Anneli Giske	1									1				
Ingvild Isaksen	1										1			
Monica Knudsen	1							1						
Kristine Minde	1										1			
Anne Nymark Andersen	1				1									
Guro Reiten	1												1	
Kristin Sandberg	1					1								
Lene Storløkken	1									1				
Anita Waage	1					1								
Own goals	5							1		1	1			2
Total	60	4	3	1	2	5	5	4	10	6	7	0	4	9

=== Poland ===
Player	Goals	2025
Natalia Padilla	1	1
Ewa Pajor	1	1
Martyna Wiankowska	1	1
Total	3	3

=== Portugal ===
Player	Goals	2017	2022	2025
Diana Gomes	2		1	1
Carolina Mendes	2	2		
Carole Costa	1		1	
Telma Encarnação	1			1
Ana Leite	1	1		
Diana Silva	1		1	
Jéssica Silva	1		1	
Total	9	3	4	2

Own goals scored for opponents

- Carole Costa (scored for Sweden in 2022)

=== Russia ===
Player	Goals	1997	2001	2009	2013	2017
Elena Morozova	2				1	1
Elena Danilova	1					1
Irina Grigorieva	1	1				
Nelli Korovkina	1				1	
Olesya Kurochkina	1			1		
Larissa Savina	1	1				
Alexandra Svetlitskaia	1		1			
Elena Terekhova	1				1	
Ksenia Tsybutovich	1			1		
Total	10	2	1	2	3	2

=== Scotland ===
Player	Goals	2017
Erin Cuthbert	1	1
Caroline Weir	1	1
Total	2	2

=== Spain ===
Player	Goals	1997	2013	2017	2022	2025
Esther González	5				1	4
Alexia Putellas	4		1			3
Mariona Caldentey	3				1	2
Ángeles Parejo	3	3				
Aitana Bonmatí	2				1	1
Veronica Boquete	2		2			
Athenea del Castillo	2					2
Jenni Hermoso	2		2			
Irene Paredes	2				1	1
Clàudia Pina	2					2
Marta Cardona	1				1	
Lucía García	1				1	
Patricia Guijarro	1					1
Vicky López	1					1
Vicky Losada	1			1		
Cristina Martín-Prieto	1					1
Amanda Sampedro	1			1		
Total	34	3	5	2	6	18

Own goals scored for opponents

- Irene Paredes (scored for Norway in 2013)

=== Sweden ===
Player	Goals	1984	1987	1989	1995	1997	2001	2005	2009	2013	2017	2022	2025
Lotta Schelin	8								1	5	2		
Stina Blackstenius	6										2	1	3
Hanna Ljungberg	6					1	2	3					
Kosovare Asllani	5								1	1		1	2
Pia Sundhage	5	4		1									
Lena Videkull	5		1	1	3								
Victoria Sandell Svensson	4					1			3				
Filippa Angeldahl	3											2	1
Nilla Fischer	3									3			
Helen Johansson	3	1		1	1								
Gunilla Axén	2		2										
Anneli Andelén	2				2								
Malin Andersson	2				1	1							
Lina Hurtig	2												2
Ulrika Kalte	2				2								
Josefine Öqvist	2									2			
Fridolina Rolfö	2											1	1
Jonna Andersson	1											1	
Kristin Bengtsson	1						1						
Hanna Bennison	1											1	
Anette Börjesson	1		1										
Sofia Eriksson	1						1						
Linda Fagerström	1						1						
Kristin Jonsson	1					1							
Marie Hammarström	1									1			
Smilla Holmberg	1												1
Tina Nordlund	1						1						
Anna Pohjanen	1					1							
Charlotte Rohlin	1								1				
Caroline Seger	1								1				
Linda Sembrant	1											1	
Anna Sjöström	1							1					
Jane Törnqvist	1						1						
Doris Uusitalo	1	1											
Own goals	3					1				1		1	
Total	82	6	4	3	9	6	7	4	7	13	4	9	10

Own goals scored for opponents

- Stina Segerström (scored for Norway in 2009)

=== Switzerland ===
Player	Goals	2017	2022	2025
Ramona Bachmann	2	1	1	
Géraldine Reuteler	2		1	1
Ana-Maria Crnogorčević	1	1		
Lara Dickenmann	1	1		
Rahel Kiwic	1		1	
Alayah Pilgrim	1			1
Nadine Riesen	1			1
Coumba Sow	1		1	
Riola Xhemaili	1			1
Total	11	3	4	4

Own goals scored for opponents

- Ana-Maria Crnogorčević (scored for the Netherlands in 2022)
- Julia Stierli (scored for Norway in 2025)

=== Ukraine ===
Player	Goals	2009
Daryna Apanashchenko	1	1
Lyudmyla Pekur	1	1
Total	2	2

=== Wales ===
Player	Goals	2025
Hannah Cain	1	1
Jess Fishlock	1	1
Total	2	2
