= UEFA Women's Championship records and statistics =

This is a list of records and statistics of the UEFA Women's Championship.

== General statistics by tournament ==
Year	Host	Champion	Winning coach	Winning captain	Top scorer(s)	Golden Player award
1984	Various	Sweden	(Sweden) Ulf Lyfors	(Sweden) Anette Börjesson	(Sweden) Pia Sundhage (3)	(Sweden) Pia Sundhage
1987	Norway	Norway	(Norway) Erling Hokstad	(Norway) Heidi Støre	(Norway) Trude Stendal (3)	(Norway) Heidi Støre
1989	West Germany	West Germany	(West Germany) Gero Bisanz	(West Germany) Silvia Neid	(Norway) Sissel Grude (2) (West Germany) Ursula Lohn (2)	(West Germany) Doris Fitschen
1991	Denmark	Germany	(Germany) Gero Bisanz	(Germany) Silvia Neid	(Germany) Heidi Mohr (4)	(Germany) Silvia Neid
1993	Italy	Norway	(Norway) Even Pellerud	(Norway) Heidi Støre	(Denmark) Susan Mackensie (2)	(Norway) Hege Riise
1995	Various	Germany	(Germany) Gero Bisanz	(Germany) Silvia Neid	(Sweden) Lena Videkull (3)	(Germany) Birgit Prinz
1997	Norway; Sweden	Germany	(Germany) Tina Theune	(Germany) Martina Voss	(Italy) Carolina Morace (4) (Norway) Marianne Pettersen (4) (France) Angélique Roujas (4)	(Italy) Carolina Morace
2001	Germany	Germany	(Germany) Tina Theune	(Germany) Doris Fitschen	(Germany) Claudia Müller (3) (Germany) Sandra Smisek (3)	(Sweden) Hanna Ljungberg
2005	England	Germany	(Germany) Tina Theune	(Germany) Birgit Prinz	(Germany) Inka Grings (4)	(Finland) Anne Mäkinen
2009	Finland	Germany	(Germany) Silvia Neid	(Germany) Birgit Prinz	(Germany) Inka Grings (6)	(Germany) Inka Grings
2013	Sweden	Germany	(Germany) Silvia Neid	(Germany) Nadine Angerer	(Sweden) Lotta Schelin (5)	(Germany) Nadine Angerer
2017	Netherlands	Netherlands	(Netherlands) Sarina Wiegman	(Netherlands) Mandy van den Berg	(England) Jodie Taylor (5)	(Netherlands) Lieke Martens
2022	England	England	(Netherlands) Sarina Wiegman	(England) Leah Williamson	(England) Beth Mead (6) (Germany) Alexandra Popp (6)	(England) Beth Mead
2025	Switzerland	England	(Netherlands) Sarina Wiegman	(England) Leah Williamson	(Spain) Esther González (4)	(Spain) Aitana Bonmatí
2029	Germany	TBA	TBA	TBA	TBA	TBA

== Debut of teams ==
Year	Debuting teams			Successor teams
Year	Teams	No.	Cum.	Successor teams
1984	Denmark, England, Italy, Sweden	4	4	
1987	Norway	1	5	
1989	West Germany	1	6	
1991	None	0	6	Germany
1993	None	0	6	
1995	None	0	6	
1997	France, Russia, Spain	3	9	
2001	None	0	9	
2005	Finland	1	10	
2009	Iceland, Netherlands, Ukraine	3	13	
2013	None	0	13	
2017	Austria, Belgium, Portugal, Scotland, Switzerland	5	18	
2022	Northern Ireland	1	19	
2025	Poland, Wales	2	21	
2029				

== Overall team records ==
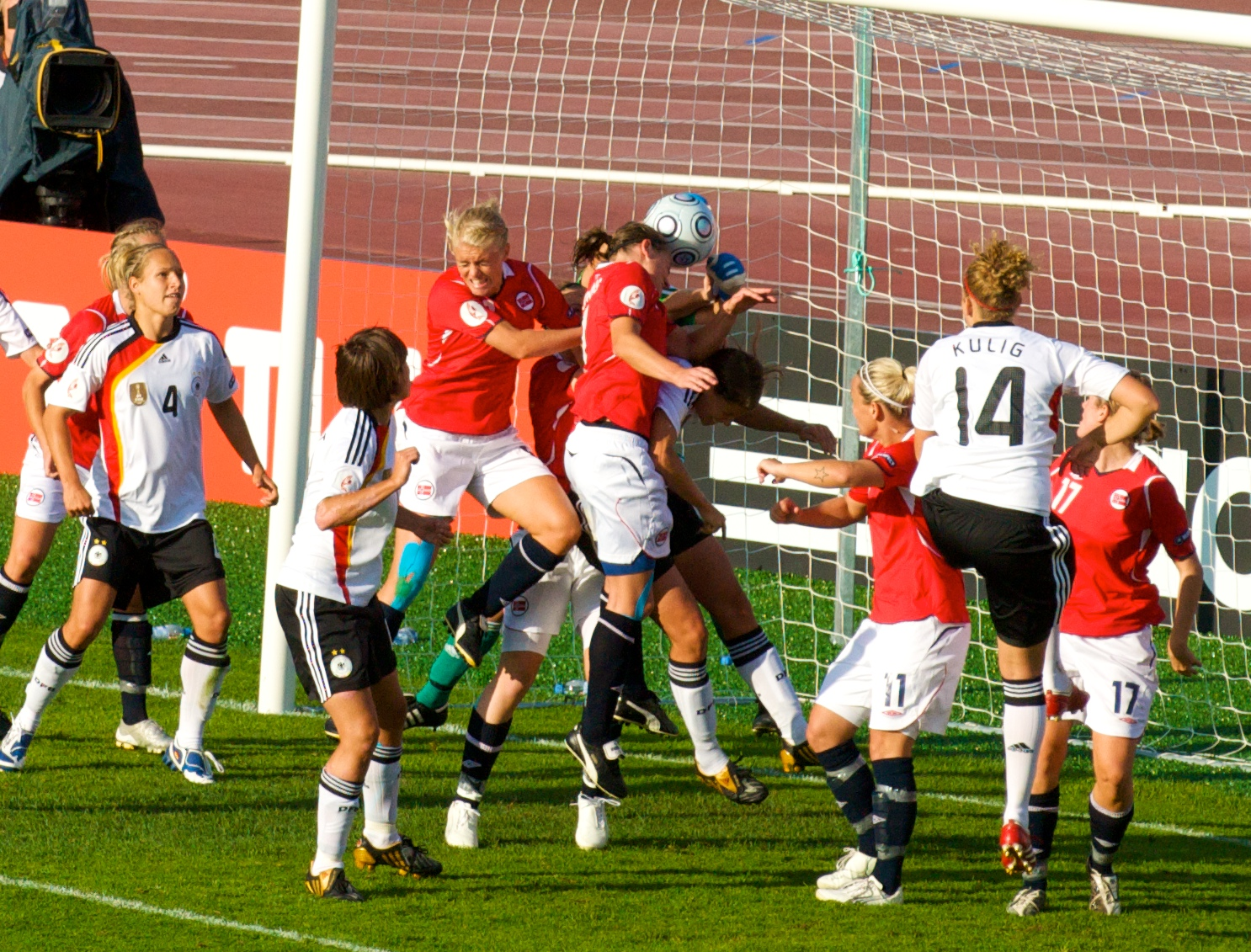
Players fighting for the ball during the match between Germany and Norway in UEFA Women's Euro 2009 in Tampere, Finland.

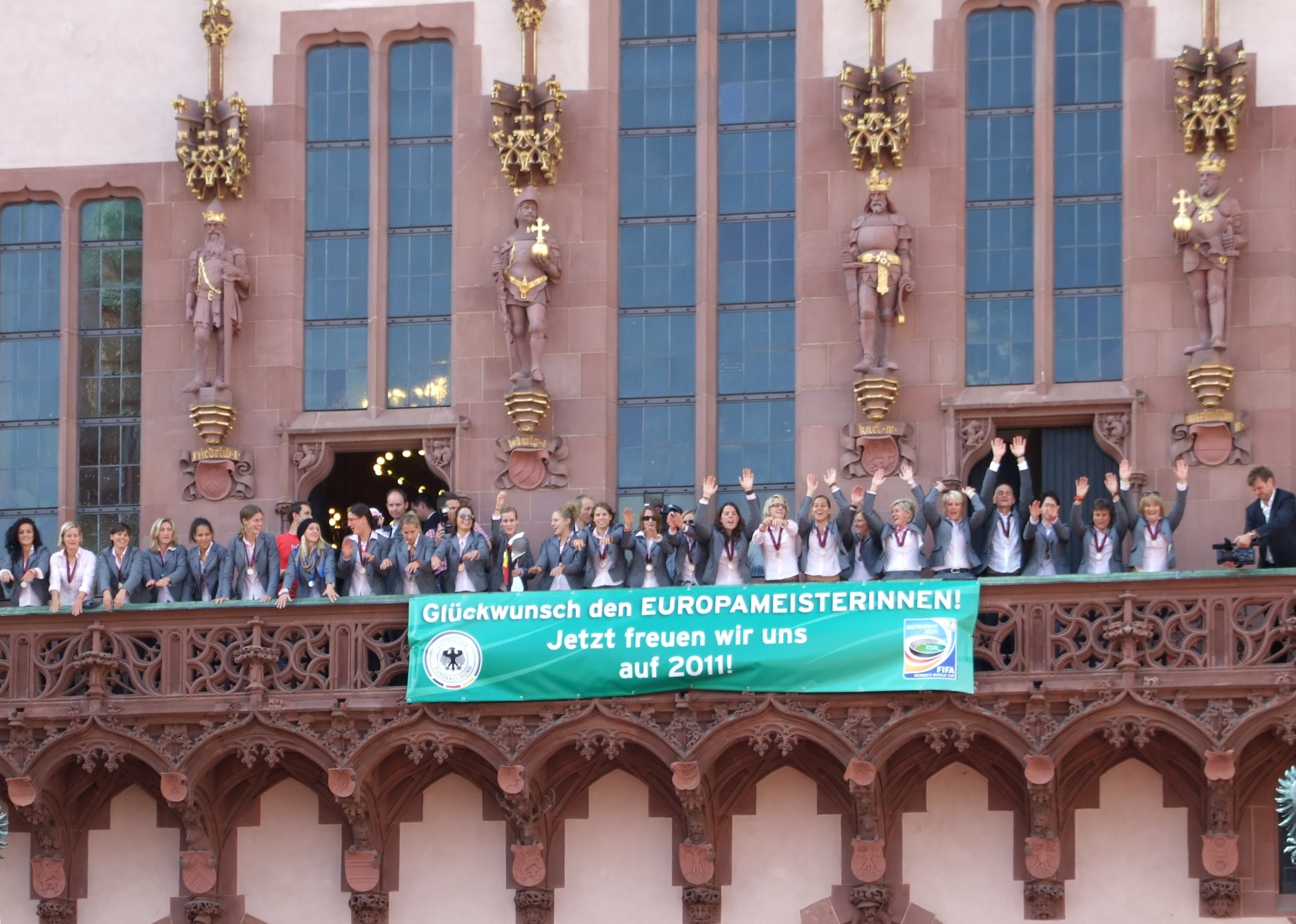
Reception of Germany women's national football team, after winning the 2009 UEFA Women's Championship, on the balcony of Frankfurt's city hall "Römer"

In this ranking 3 points are awarded for a win, 1 for a draw and 0 for a loss. As per statistical convention in football, matches decided in extra time are counted as wins and losses, while matches decided by penalty shoot-outs are counted as draws. Teams are ranked by total points, then by goal difference, then by goals scored.

As of UEFA Women's Euro 2025

Rank	Team	Part	Pld	W	D	L	GF	GA	GD	Pts
1	Germany (Note: Includes participations as West Germany before 1991.)	12	51	38	7	6	108	34	+74	121
2	Sweden	12	46	25	7	14	82	50	+32	82
3	England	10	40	20	5	15	78	60	+18	65
4	Norway	13	43	19	7	17	60	65	−5	64
5	France	8	30	14	9	7	51	39	+12	51
6	Denmark	11	36	10	8	18	37	51	−14	38
7	Italy	13	42	10	8	24	44	70	−26	38
8	Netherlands	5	21	11	3	7	32	24	+8	36
9	Spain	5	22	10	4	8	34	23	+11	34
10	Finland	5	17	4	4	9	15	30	−15	16
11	Austria	2	9	4	3	2	8	4	+4	15
12	Belgium	3	10	3	1	6	10	15	−5	10
13	Switzerland	3	10	2	3	5	11	16	−5	9
14	Iceland	5	16	1	4	11	10	29	−19	7
15	Russia	5	15	1	3	11	10	31	−21	6
16	Portugal	3	9	1	2	6	9	23	−14	5
17	Ukraine	1	3	1	0	2	2	4	−2	3
18	Poland	1	3	1	0	2	3	7	−4	3
19	Scotland	1	3	1	0	2	2	8	−6	3
20	Northern Ireland	1	3	0	0	3	1	11	−10	0
21	Wales	1	3	0	0	3	2	13	−11	0

== Medal table ==
In the inaugural 1984 tournament, no bronze medal was awarded. In 1987, 1989, 1991 and 1993 there was a third-place play-off to determine bronze. From 1995 onwards, both losing semi-finalists are awarded bronze.

Rank	Nation	Gold	Silver	Bronze	Total
1	Germany	8	1	1	10
2	Norway	2	4	3	9
3	England	2	2	2	6
4	Sweden	1	3	5	9
5	Netherlands	1	0	1	2
6	Italy	0	2	3	5
7	Denmark	0	1	4	5
8	Spain	0	1	1	2
9	Austria	0	0	1	1
9	Finland	0	0	1	1
9	France	0	0	1	1
Totals (11 entries)		14	14	23	51

== Comprehensive team results by tournament ==
Legend

- 1st – Champions
- 2nd – Runners-up
- 3rd – Third place (1987–1993)
- 4th – Fourth place (1987–1993)
- SF – Semi-finalists (1984, and since 1995)
- QF – Quarter-finalists (since 2009)
- GS – Group stage
- Q – Qualified for upcoming tournament
- • – Did not qualify
- × – Did not enter / Withdrew / Banned
- – Hosts

For each tournament, the number of teams in each finals tournament (in brackets) are shown.

Team	1984	1987 (Norway)	1989 (West Germany)	1991 (Denmark)	1993 (Italy)	1995	1997 (Norway) (Sweden)	2001 (Germany)	2005 (England)	2009 (Finland)	2013 (Sweden)	2017 (Netherlands)	2022 (England)	2025 (Switzerland)	2029 (Germany)	Total
Team	(4)						(8)			(12)		(16)				Total
Austria	×	×	×	×	×	×	•	•	•	•	•	SF	QF	•		2
Belgium	•	•	•	•	•	•	•	•	•	•	•	GS	QF	GS		3
Denmark	SF	•	•	3rd	3rd	•	GS	SF	GS	GS	SF	2nd	GS	GS		11
England	2nd	4th	•	•	•	SF	•	GS	GS	2nd	GS	SF	1st	1st		10
Finland	•	•	•	•	•	•	•	•	SF	QF	GS	•	GS	GS		5
France	•	•	•	•	•	•	GS	GS	GS	QF	QF	QF	SF	QF		8
Germany	•	•	1st	1st	4th	1st	1st	1st	1st	1st	1st	QF	2nd	SF		13
Iceland	•	×	×	×	•	•	•	•	•	GS	QF	GS	GS	GS		5
Italy	SF	3rd	4th	4th	2nd	•	2nd	GS	GS	QF	QF	GS	GS	SF		13
Netherlands	•	•	•	•	•	•	•	•	•	SF	GS	1st	QF	GS		5
Northern Ireland	•	•	×	•	×	×	×	×	×	•	•	•	GS	•		1
Norway	•	1st	2nd	2nd	1st	SF	GS	SF	2nd	SF	2nd	GS	GS	QF		13
Poland	×	×	×	•	•	•	•	•	•	•	•	•	•	GS		1
Portugal	•	•	•	•	•	•	•	•	•	•	•	GS	GS	GS		3
Russia	Part of Soviet Union				•	•	GS	GS	•	GS	GS	GS	×	×		5
Scotland	•	•	×	×	•	•	•	•	•	•	•	GS	•	•		1
Spain	×	•	•	•	•	•	SF	•	•	•	QF	QF	QF	2nd		5
Sweden	1st	2nd	3rd	•	•	2nd	SF	2nd	SF	QF	SF	QF	SF	QF		12
Switzerland	•	•	•	•	•	•	•	•	•	•	•	GS	GS	QF		3
Ukraine	Part of Soviet Union				×	•	•	•	•	GS	•	•	•	•		1
Wales	×	×	×	×	•	•	•	•	×	•	•	•	•	GS		1

Notes:

- The Soviet Union team was created only in 1990 and did not participate in continental competitions.
- The East Germany team was created only in 1990 and did not participate in continental competitions.
- Most of the countries of the "Eastern Bloc" ("Socialist camp") did not field their women teams.

== Results of defending finalists ==
Year	Defending champions	Finish	Defending runners-up	Finish
1987	Sweden	Runners-up	England	Fourth place
1989	Norway	Runners-up	Sweden	Third place
1991	Germany	Champions	Norway	Runners-up
1993	Germany	Fourth place	Norway	Champions
1995	Norway	Semi-finals	Italy	Did not qualify
1997	Germany	Champions	Sweden	Semi-finals
2001	Germany	Champions	Italy	Group stage
2005	Germany	Champions	Sweden	Semi-finals
2009	Germany	Champions	Norway	Semi-finals
2013	Germany	Champions	England	Group stage
2017	Germany	Quarter-finals	Norway	Group stage
2022	Netherlands	Quarter-finals	Denmark	Group stage
2025	England	Champions	Germany	Semi-finals
2029	England	To be determined	Spain	To be determined

== Tournament awards ==
=== Top scorers ===
Year	Player	Matches played	Goals
1984	(Sweden) Pia Sundhage	4	4
1987	(Norway) Trude Stendal	2	3
1989	(Norway) Sissel Grude (West Germany) Ursula Lohn	2	2
1991	(Germany) Heidi Mohr	2	4
1993	(Denmark) Susan Mackensie	2	2
1995	(Sweden) Lena Videkull	3	3
1997	(Italy) Carolina Morace (Norway) Marianne Pettersen (France) Angélique Roujas	5	4
2001	(Germany) Claudia Müller (Germany) Sandra Smisek	5	3
2005	(Germany) Inka Grings	5	4
2009	(Germany) Inka Grings	6	6
2013	(Sweden) Lotta Schelin	6	5
2017	(England) Jodie Taylor	6	5
2022	(England) Beth Mead (Germany) Alexandra Popp	6	6
2025	(Spain) Esther González	6	4

=== UEFA.com Golden Player ===
Year	Player
1984	(Sweden) Pia Sundhage
1987	(Norway) Heidi Støre
1989	(West Germany) Doris Fitschen
1991	(Germany) Silvia Neid
1993	(Norway) Hege Riise
1995	(Germany) Birgit Prinz
1997	(Italy) Carolina Morace
2001	(Sweden) Hanna Ljungberg
2005	(Finland) Anne Mäkinen
2009	(Germany) Inka Grings
2013	(Germany) Nadine Angerer^{1}
2017	(Netherlands) Lieke Martens^{1}
2022	(England) Beth Mead^{1}
2025	(Spain) Aitana Bonmatí^{1}

^{1}Official player of the tournament since 2013

=== Best young player ===
Year	Player
2022	(Germany) Lena Oberdorf
2025	(England) Michelle Agyemang

== Teams: tournament position ==
Teams having equal quantities in the tables below are ordered by the tournament the quantity was attained in (the teams that attained the quantity first are listed first). If the quantity was attained by more than one team in the same tournament, these teams are ordered alphabetically.

Most titles won
8, Germany (1989, 1991, 1995, 1997, 2001, 2005, 2009, 2013).
Most finishes in the top two
9, Germany (1989, 1991, 1995, 1997, 2001, 2005, 2009, 2013, 2022).
Most finishes in the top four
11, Germany (1989, 1991, 1993, 1995, 1997, 2001, 2005, 2009, 2013, 2022, 2025).
Most championship appearances
13, Italy and Norway.

=== Consecutive ===
Most consecutive championships
6, Germany (1995–2013).
Most consecutive finishes in the top two
6, Germany (1995–2013).
Most consecutive finishes in the top four
9, Germany (1989–2013).
Most consecutive appearances in the finals
13, Norway (1987–2025).

=== Gaps ===
Longest gap between successive titles
6 years, Norway (1987–1993).
Longest gap between successive appearances in the top two
25 years, England (1984–2009).
Longest gap between successive appearances in the top four
28 years, Italy, Spain (1997–2025).
Longest gap between successive appearances in the finals
16 years, Spain (1997–2013).

=== Host team ===
Best finish by host team
Champion: Norway (1987), Germany (1989, 2001), Netherlands (2017) and England (2022).
Worst finish by host team
Group stage: Norway (1997) and England (2005).

=== Defending champion ===
Best finish by defending champion
Champion: Germany (1991, 1997, 2001, 2005, 2009, 2013) and England (2025).
Worst finish by defending champion
Quarter-finals: Germany (2017) and Netherlands (2022).

=== Debuting teams ===
Best finish by a debuting team
Champion: Sweden (1984), Norway (1987) and Germany (1989).

=== Other ===
Most finishes in the top two without ever being champion
2, Italy (1993, 1997).
Most finishes in the top four without ever being champion
7, Italy (1984–1993, 1997, 2025).
Most appearances without ever being champion
13, Italy (1984–1993, 1997–2025).
Most finishes in the top four without ever finishing in the top two
1, Finland (2005), Austria (2017) and France (2022).
Most appearances without ever finishing in the top two
8, France (1997–2025).
Most appearances without ever finishing in the top four
5, Russia (1997–2001, 2009–2017), Iceland (2009–2025).
Teams that overcame tournament champion
Norway, 2013 (1–0 vs Germany); France, 2025 (2–1 vs England).
Most played final
4, Germany vs Norway (1989, 1991, 2005, 2013).
Most played match
10, Germany vs Norway (1989, 1991, 1997, 2001, 2005 (2x), 2009 (2x), 2013 (2x)).

== Coaches: tournament position ==
Most championships
3, Gero Bisanz (Germany, 1989–1991, 1995); Tina Theune (Germany, 1997–2005); Sarina Wiegman (Netherlands, 2017, England, 2022–2025).
Most finishes in the top two
3, Gero Bisanz (Germany, 1989–1991, 1995); Tina Theune (Germany, 1997–2005); Even Pellerud (Norway, 1991–1993, 2013); Sarina Wiegman (Netherlands, 2017, England, 2022–2025).
Most finishes in the top four
4, Gero Bisanz (Germany, 1989–1995); Sergio Guenza (Italy, 1989–1993, 1997); Even Pellerud (Norway, 1991–1995, 2013).

== Teams: matches played and goals scored ==
=== All time ===
Most matches played
51, Germany.
Most wins
38, Germany.
Fewest wins
0, Northern Ireland, Wales.
Most losses
22, Italy.
Fewest losses
2, Austria, Poland, Scotland, Ukraine.
Most draws
9, France.
Most goals scored
113, Germany.
Most goals conceded
70, Italy.
Fewest goals scored
1, Northern Ireland.
Fewest goals conceded
4, Austria, Ukraine.
Highest goal difference
+79, Germany.
Lowest goal difference
−26, Italy.

=== In one tournament ===
Most wins
6, Germany (2009), Netherlands (2017), England (2022).
Most goals scored
22, England, 2022.
Most goals scored, group stage
14, England (2022), Spain (2025).
Most goals scored, champions
22, England, 2022.
Most goals scored, hosts
22, England, 2022.
Fewest goals scored, champions
2, Norway, 1993.
Fewest goals scored, hosts
1, Italy, 1993.
Most goals conceded, champions
5, Germany, 2009.
Fewest goals conceded, champions
0, Norway, 1993.

== Streaks ==
Most consecutive wins
19, Germany, from 2–0 vs Denmark (1997) to 6–2 vs England (2009).
Most consecutive matches without a loss
26, Germany, from 4–1 vs England (1995) to 3–0 vs Iceland (2013).
Most consecutive losses
6, Russia, from 0–5 vs Germany (2001) to 1–3 vs France (2013).
Most consecutive matches without a win
12, Russia, from 1–2 vs Sweden (1997) to 1–1 vs Spain (2013).
Most consecutive Top-scoring team
3, Germany (2001–2009).

== Individual ==
Most championships
5, Birgit Prinz (Germany, 1995–2009) and Nadine Angerer (Germany, 1997–2013).
Most medals
5, Heidi Støre (Norway, 1987–1995); Birgit Prinz (Germany, 1995–2009); Nadine Angerer (Germany, 1997–2013).
Most matches played, final tournaments
23, Birgit Prinz (Germany, 1995–2009).
Most matches played, including qualifying
61, Gillian Coultard (England, 1981–2000).
Most knockout games played, final tournaments
11, Doris Fitschen (Germany, 1989–2001) and Birgit Prinz (Germany, 1995–2009).
Most appearances in a championship final
5, Birgit Prinz (Germany, 1995–2009).
Most appearances as captain
12, Pernille Harder (Denmark, 2017–2025), Leah Williamson (England, 2022–2025).
Most tournaments as captain
5, Heidi Støre (Norway, 1987–1995).
Youngest player
16 years, 156 days, Oksana Yakovyshyn (Ukraine), vs Netherlands, 23 August 2009.
Oldest player
39 years, 340 days, Sandrine Soubeyrand (France), vs Denmark, 22 July 2013.
Oldest captain
39 years, 340 days, Sandrine Soubeyrand (France), vs Denmark, 22 July 2013.
Largest age difference on the same team
23 years, 147 days, 2009, Ukraine (Olena Mazurenko: 39 years, 303 days; Oksana Yakovyshyn: 16 years, 156 days).

== Goalscoring ==
=== Individual ===
Most goals scored, final tournaments
10, Inka Grings (Germany, 1997–2009) and Birgit Prinz (Germany, 1995–2009).
Most goals scored, qualifying
37, Margrét Lára Viðarsdóttir (Iceland, 2003–2019).
Most goals scored, final tournaments and qualifying
42, Carolina Morace (Italy, 1984–1997).
Most goals scored in a tournament
6, Inka Grings (Germany, 2009), Beth Mead (England, 2022), Alexandra Popp (Germany, 2022).
Most goals scored in a match
4, Marianne Pettersen (Norway), vs Denmark, 1997.
Most goals scored in a qualifying match
7, María Paz Vilas (Spain), vs Kazakhstan, 2013.
Most goals scored in all final matches
5, Birgit Prinz (Germany), 1 vs Sweden in 1995, 1 vs Italy in 1997, 1 vs Norway in 2005 & 2 vs England in 2009.
Most matches with at least one goal
9, Birgit Prinz (Germany, 1995–2009).
Most consecutive matches with at least one goal
5, Alexandra Popp (Germany, 2022).
Most matches with at least two goals
3, Heidi Mohr (Germany, 1991, 1995) and Inka Grings (Germany, 2005–2009).
Fastest hat-trick
18 minutes, Lena Videkull (Sweden), scored at 59', 61' and 76', vs Norway, 1995.
Fastest hat-trick from kickoff
45 minutes, Grace Geyoro (France), scored at 9', 40' and 45', vs Italy, 2022.
Most tournaments with at least one goals
5, Birgit Prinz (Germany, 1995–2009).
Most tournaments with at least two goals
4, Birgit Prinz (Germany, 1995–1997, 2005–2009).
Most tournaments with at least three goals
2, Inka Grings (Germany, 2005–2009).
Most tournaments with at least four goals
2, Inka Grings (Germany, 2005–2009).
Longest period between a player's first and last goals
15 years, 323 days: Kosovare Asllani (Sweden, 28 August 2009 – 17 July 2025).
Longest period between one goal and the next
12 years, 308 days: Linda Sällström (Finland, 3 September 2009 – 8 July 2022).
Youngest goalscorer
16 years, 351 days, Isabell Herlovsen (Norway), vs France, 9 June 2005.
Youngest hat-trick scorer
22 years, 79 days, Marianne Pettersen (Norway), vs Denmark, 30 June 1997.
Youngest goalscorer, final
17 years, 152 days, Birgit Prinz (Germany), vs Sweden, 26 March 1995.
Oldest goalscorer
38 years, 176 days, Jess Fishlock (Wales), vs France, 9 July 2025.
Oldest hat-trick scorer
32 years, 89 days, Lena Videkull (Sweden), vs Norway, 5 March 1995.
Oldest goalscorer, final
31 years, 320 days, Birgit Prinz (Germany), vs England, 10 September 2009.
Fastest goal from kickoff in a final
6th minute, Malin Andersson (Sweden), vs Germany, 1995.
Latest goal from kickoff
119th minute, Chloe Kelly (England), vs Italy, 2025.
Latest goal from kickoff in a final
110th minute, Chloe Kelly (England), vs Germany, 2022.

=== Team ===
Biggest margin of victory
8, England (8) vs Norway (0), 2022.
Biggest margin of victory, qualifying match
17, Spain (17) vs Slovenia (0), 1995 Group 7; Norway (17) vs Slovakia (0), 1997 Group 1; Germany (17) vs Kazakhstan (0), 2013 Group 2.
Most goals scored in a match, one team
8, England vs Norway, 2022.
Most goals scored in a final, both teams
8, Germany (6) vs England (2), 2009.
Most goals in a tournament, one team
22, England, 2022.
Most individual goalscorers for one team, one tournament
11, England, 2025 (Michelle Agyemang, Aggie Beever-Jones, Lucy Bronze, Lauren Hemp, Lauren James, Chloe Kelly, Beth Mead, Alessia Russo, Georgia Stanway, Ella Toone, Keira Walsh).
Fewest individual goalscorers for one team, one tournament, champions
2, Norway, 1993 (Birthe Hegstad, Anne Nymark Andersen).

=== Tournament ===
Most goals scored in a tournament
106 goals, 2025.
Fewest goals scored in a tournament
8 goals, 1993.
Most goals per match in a tournament
5 goals per match, 1995.
Fewest goals per match in a tournament
2 goals per match, 1993.
Most players scoring at least two goals in a tournament
24, 2025.
Most players scoring at least three goals in a tournament
5, 2005, 2009 and 2022.
Most players scoring at least four goals in a tournament
3, 1997 and 2022.
Most players scoring at least five goals in a tournament
2, 2022 - Beth Mead (England) and Alexandra Popp (Germany).
Most players scoring at least six goals in a tournament
2, 2022 - Beth Mead (England) and Alexandra Popp (Germany).

=== Top-scoring teams by tournament ===
- 1984: **Sweden**, 6 goals
- 1987: **Norway** and Sweden, 4 goals
- 1989: **West Germany**, 5 goals
- 1991: **Germany**, 6 goals
- 1993: Denmark, 3 goals
- 1995: **Germany** and Sweden, 9 goals
- 1997: Italy, 7 goals
- 2001: **Germany**, 13 goals
- 2005: **Germany**, 15 goals
- 2009: **Germany**, 21 goals
- 2013: Sweden, 13 goals
- 2017: **Netherlands**, 13 goals
- 2022: **England**, 22 goals
- 2025: Spain, 18 goals

Teams listed in bold won the tournament.

== Goalkeeping ==
Most matches played, finals
17: Hedvig Lindahl (Sweden, 2005–2009, 2017–2022).
Most clean sheets (matches without conceding)
11: Silke Rottenberg (Germany, 1997–2005).
Most goals conceded, one tournament
14, Rachel Brown (England, 2009).
Fewest goals conceded, one tournament, champions
0, Reidun Seth (Norway, 1993).
Youngest goalkeeper
17 years, 110 days: Eva Russo (Italy), vs Sweden, 8 April 1984.
Oldest goalkeeper
39 years, 88 days: Hedvig Lindahl (Sweden), vs England, 26 July 2022.

== Coaching ==
Most matches coached
18, Sarina Wiegman (Netherlands, 2017, England, 2022–2025).
Most matches won
15, Sarina Wiegman (Netherlands, 2017, England, 2022–2025).
Most matches lost
8, Hope Powell (England, 2001–2013).
Most tournaments
4, Gero Bisanz (Germany, 1989–1995), Sergio Guenza (Italy, 1989–1993, 1997), Even Pellerud (Norway, 1991–1995, 2013), Hope Powell (England, 2001–2013).
Youngest coach
34 years, 198 days, Hope Powell (England), vs Russia, 2001.
Youngest coach, champions
39 years, 354 days, Even Pellerud (Norway), vs Italy, 1993.
Oldest coach
66 years, 79 days, Kenny Shiels (Northern Ireland), vs England, 2022.
Oldest coach, champions
59 years, 121 days, Gero Bisanz (Germany), vs Sweden, 1995.
Foreign coach, champions
(Netherlands) Sarina Wiegman (England, 2022, 2025).

== Discipline ==
Most sendings off (tournament)
5, 2025.
Most cautions (tournament)
90, 2017.

== Attendance ==
Highest attendance in a match
87,192, England vs Germany, 31 July 2022, Wembley, London, United Kingdom, 2022.
Highest attendance in a final
87,192, England vs Germany, 31 July 2022, Wembley, London, United Kingdom, 2022.
Highest attendance in a qualifying match
63,248, England vs Sweden, 5 April 2024, Wembley, London, United Kingdom, 2025 Group A3.
Highest average of attendance per match
21,203, 2025, hosted by Switzerland.
Highest attendance in a tournament
657,291, 2025, hosted by Switzerland.
Lowest attendance in a tournament
11,500, 1993, hosted by Italy.

=== Total and average attendance ===
Year	Matches	Attendance							
Year	Matches	Total	Average	Lowest			Highest		
1984	6	20,720	3,453	ENG – DEN	Semi-finals	1,000	SWE – ENG	Final	5,552
1987	4	14,428	3,607	SWE – ENG	Semi-finals	300	NOR – SWE	Final	8,470
1989	4	35,000	8,750	NOR – SWE; SWE – ITA	Semi-finals/ Third place match	2,500	FRG – NOR	Final	22,000
1991	4	14,050	3,512	GER – ITA	Semi-finals	3,000	NOR – DEN	Semi-finals	4,850
1993	4	11,500	2,875	DEN – GER	Third place match	500	NOR – ITA	Final	7,000
1995	5	20,545	4,109	ENG – GER	Semi-finals	800	GER – SWE	Final	8,500
1997	15	?	?	NOR – ITA	Round 1	520	NOR – GER	Round 1	7,666
2001	15	92,703	6,180	SWE – RUS	Semi-finals	820	GER – SWE	Final	18,000
2005	15	118,403	7,894	FRA – ITA	Round 1	957	ENG – FIN	Round 1	29,092
2009	25	134,907	5,396	RUS – ITA	Round 1	1,112	FIN – DEN	Round 1	16,334
2013	25	216,888	8,676	RUS – ESP	Round 1	2,157	GER – NOR	Final	41,301
2017	31	247,041	7,969	ITA – RUS	Round 1	669	NED – DEN	Final	28,182
2022	31	574,865	18,544	BEL – ISL	Round 1	3,859	ENG – GER	Final	87,192
2025	31	657,291	21,203	NOR – FIN	Round 1	7,376	ENG – ESP	Final	34,203

== Penalty shoot-outs ==
Most shoot-outs, team, all-time
4, Denmark.
Most shoot-outs, team, tournament
2, Denmark, 2013, Austria, 2017, England, 2025.
Most shoot-outs, all teams, tournament
3, 2025.
Most wins, team, all-time
2, Denmark, England, Germany, Norway.
Most losses, team, all-time
3, France.
Most successful kicks, shoot-out, one team
8, Norway, vs Denmark, 1991.
Most successful kicks, shoot-out, both teams
15, Norway (8) vs Denmark (7), 1991.
Most successful kicks, team, all-time
16, Denmark (in 4 shoot-outs).
Most successful kicks, team, tournament
8, Norway, 1991 (in 1 shoot-outs).
Most successful kicks, all teams, tournament
20, 2025 (in 3 shoot-outs).
