= Birgit Prinz =

German footballer (born 1977)

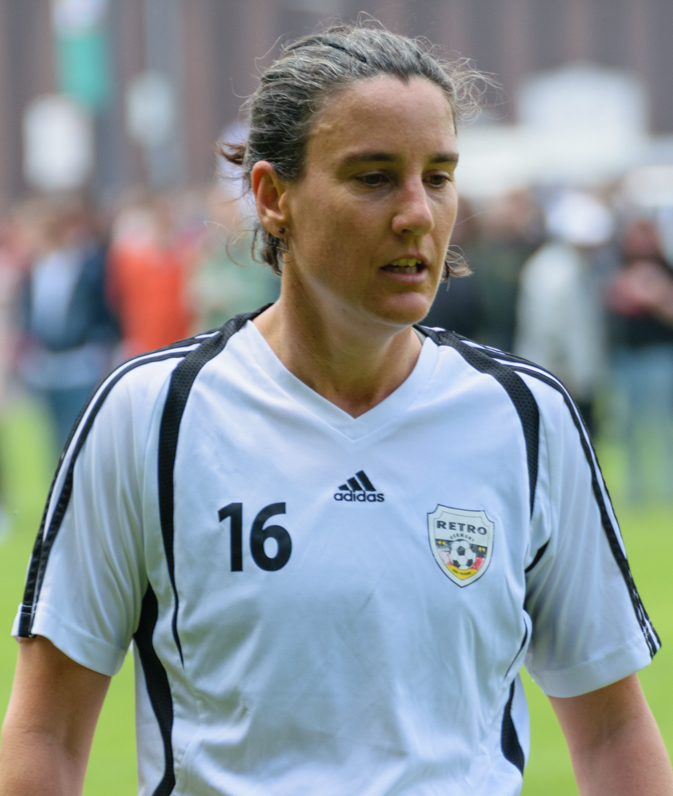
- Prinz in 2018

Personal information
- Date of birth: 25 October 1977 (age 48)
- Place of birth: Frankfurt, West Germany
- Height: 1.79 m (5 ft 10 in)
- Position: Striker

Youth career
- 1986–1988: Dörnigheimer SV 1973
- 1988–1992: 1. FC 1911 Hochstadt

Senior career*
Years	Team	Apps	(Gls)
1993–1998	FSV Frankfurt	57	(45)
1998–2002	1. FFC Frankfurt	76	(78)
2002–2003	Carolina Courage	35	(23)
2003–2011	1. FFC Frankfurt	114	(136)
Total		282	(282)

International career
1994–2011	Germany	214	(128)
Medal record
Women's football
Representing Germany
World Cup
Gold medal – first place	2003 United States	Team
Gold medal – first place	2007 China	Team
Silver medal – second place	1995 Sweden	Team
Olympic Games
Bronze medal – third place	2000 Sydney	Team
Bronze medal – third place	2004 Athens	Team
Bronze medal – third place	2008 Beijing	Team
UEFA European Women's Championship
Gold medal – first place	1995 Germany/England/Norway/Sweden	Team
Gold medal – first place	1997 Norway/Sweden	Team
Gold medal – first place	2001 Germany	Team
Gold medal – first place	2005 England	Team
Gold medal – first place	2009 Finland	Team
- * Club domestic league appearances and goals

Birgit Prinz (born 25 October 1977) is a German former footballer, two-time FIFA Women's World Cup champion and three-time FIFA World Player of the Year. In addition to the German national team, Prinz played for 1. FFC Frankfurt in the Frauen-Bundesliga as well as the Carolina Courage in the Women's United Soccer Association (WUSA), the first professional women's league in the United States. Prinz remains one of the game's most prolific strikers and is the second FIFA Women's World Cup all-time leading scorer with 14 goals (second only to Marta from Brazil). In 2011, she announced the end of her active career. She currently works as a sport psychologist for the men's and women's teams of Bundesliga club TSG 1899 Hoffenheim.

== Club career ==
Prinz began her career at Dörnigheimer SV. She made her Bundesliga debut for FSV Frankfurt, where she played from 1993 to 1998. During that time Prinz won two Bundesliga titles and two German Cups. In 1997 and 1998 she was the Bundesliga top scorer. In 1998, she moved to local rivals 1. FFC Frankfurt, where she has had her biggest success at club level. In 13 seasons at the club, Prinz won six Bundesliga and eight German Cup titles. She also won the Bundesliga top-scorer award twice more in 2001 and 2007. Prinz won the UEFA Women's Cup three times with Frankfurt, in the 2001–02, 2005–06 and 2007–08 seasons. She also reached the final in 2004, but lost to the Swedish side Umeå IK.

For two seasons, Prinz joined Carolina Courage in the professional women's league WUSA in the United States. During her short stint in America she claimed the 2002 WUSA Championship. After the 2003 World Cup, Prinz declined an offer from AC Perugia to play in Italy's men's Serie A, fearing her transfer would be used as a publicity stunt and she would end up on the bench.

In her time at FFC Frankfurt, Prinz won many personal awards, including a record eight German Female Footballer of the Year awards from 2001 to 2008. She was named the FIFA World Player of the Year in 2003, 2004 and 2005. For four consecutive years from 2007 to 2010 she came second, behind Brazil's Marta.

== International career ==
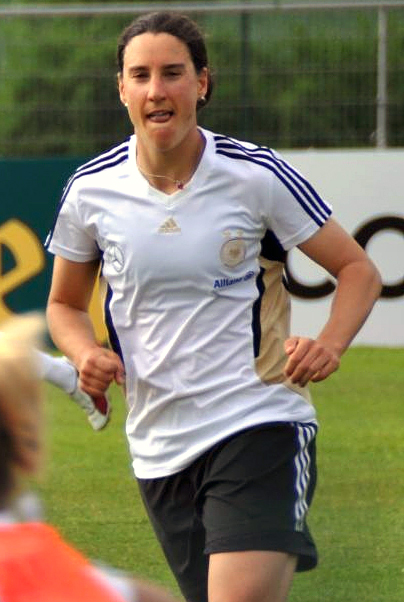
Prinz playing for Germany in 2011

At the age of 16, Prinz made her debut for the Germany national team in July 1994 against Canada. She came on after 72 minutes and scored the game-winner in the 89th minute. One year later, she won her first major title at the 1995 European Championship, scoring in the final. In the same year, she was named to Germany's squad for the 1995 FIFA Women's World Cup, where they lost to Norway in the final match. She remains the youngest player ever to appear in a World Cup Final.

For the next decade, Prinz had one of the most successful international careers in women's football. She won four more UEFA European Championships in 1997, 2001, 2005 and 2009. At the Summer Olympics she won bronze three times with the German team, in 2000, 2004 and 2008. At the 2003 FIFA Women's World Cup, Prinz helped Germany win its first World Cup title in the women's game. She was honoured as the tournament's best player and top-scorer. Prinz became the women's national team captain at the end of 2003, and remained until her retirement. Four years later, at the 2007 FIFA Women's World Cup, she captained the team to Germany's second World Cup title; she was awarded the Silver Ball as the second-best player at the tournament.

Prinz holds several national and international records. With 14 goals, she is the second all-time leading goalscorer at FIFA Women's World Cups. From 2008 until 2012, Prinz and Brazil's Cristiane both held the tournament record of ten goals at the Summer Olympics, although Cristiane has now surpassed Prinz. For the German national team Prinz appeared 214 times and scored 128 goals, and is the team's most capped player and top goalscorer.

== Personal life ==
Prinz is a trained physical therapist. In 2010, she graduated with her master's degree in psychology from the Goethe University Frankfurt. Since January 2012, she has worked as a sport psychologist in the youth academy, women's U-17 and women's Bundesliga teams at TSG 1899 Hoffenheim.

== Career statistics ==
=== International ===
Scores and results list Germany's goal tally first, score column indicates score after each Prinz goal.

List of international goals scored by Birgit Prinz
No.	Date	Venue	Opponent	Score	Result	Competition
1	27 July 1994	Saputo Stadium, Montreal, Canada	Canada	2–1	2–1	Friendly
2	2 August 1994	Bensalem Township Memorial Stadium, Oakford, USA	Norway	6–3	6–3	Friendly
3	21 September 1994	Floschenstadion, Sindelfingen, Germany	Croatia	5–0	8–0	UEFA Women's Euro 1995 qualifying
4	21 September 1994	Floschenstadion, Sindelfingen, Germany	Croatia	8–0	8–0	UEFA Women's Euro 1995 qualifying
5	23 February 1995	Ruhrstadion, Bochum, Germany	England	2–1	2–1	UEFA Women's Euro 1995
6	26 March 1995	Fritz-Walter-Stadion, Kaiserslautern, Germany	Sweden	2–1	3–2	UEFA Women's Euro 1995
7	23 May 1995	?	Switzerland	5–0	8–0	Friendly
8	9 June 1995	Tingvalla IP, Karlstad, Sweden	Brazil	1–0	6–1	1995 FIFA Women's World Cup
9	25 October 1995	Štadión Pasienky, Bratislava, Slovakia	Slovakia	1–0	3–0	UEFA Women's Euro 1997 qualifying
10	23 July 1996	RFK Stadium, Washington, D.C., United States	Norway	2–2	2–3	1996 Summer Olympics
11	24 April 1997	?, Germany	Spain	4–0	6–0	Friendly
12	24 April 1997	?, Germany	Spain	5–0	6–0	Friendly
13	6 July 1997	Melløs Stadion, Moss, Norway	Denmark	2–0	2–0	UEFA Women's Euro 1997
14	12 July 1997	Ullevaal Stadion, Oslo, Norway	Italy	2–0	2–0	UEFA Women's Euro 1997
15	25 September 1997	Paul Greifzu Stadium, Dessau-Roßlau, Germany	England	3–0	3–0	1999 FIFA Women's World Cup qualifying
16	9 October 1997	MSV-Arena, Duisburg, Germany	United States	3–1	3–1	Friendly
17	17 June 1998	Ulefoss Idrettspark, Ulefoss, Norway	Norway	1–2	2–3	1999 FIFA Women's World Cup qualifying
18	17 September 1998	Sportpark Johannisau, Fulda, Germany	Ukraine	3–0	5–0	1999 FIFA Women's World Cup qualifying
19	17 September 1998	Sportpark Johannisau, Fulda, Germany	Ukraine	4–0	5–0	1999 FIFA Women's World Cup qualifying
20	11 October 1998	NSC Olimpiyskiy, Kyiv, Ukraine	Ukraine	1–0	1–1	1999 FIFA Women's World Cup qualifying
21	14 February 1999	?, Turkey	Turkey	5–0	12–1	Friendly
22	28 March 1999	?, Germany	China	4–1	4–1	Friendly
23	27 June 1999	FedExField, Landover, United States	Brazil	1–0	3–3	1999 FIFA Women's World Cup
24	6 April 2000	Stadion am Bornheimer Hang, Frankfurt, Germany	Italy	1–0	3–0	UEFA Women's Euro 2001 qualifying
25	11 May 2000	NSC Olimpiyskiy, Kyiv, Ukraine	Ukraine	1–0	6–1	UEFA Women's Euro 2001 qualifying
26	11 May 2000	NSC Olimpiyskiy, Kyiv, Ukraine	Ukraine	2–0	6–1	UEFA Women's Euro 2001 qualifying
27	11 May 2000	NSC Olimpiyskiy, Kyiv, Ukraine	Ukraine	3–1	6–1	UEFA Women's Euro 2001 qualifying
28	11 May 2000	NSC Olimpiyskiy, Kyiv, Ukraine	Ukraine	5–1	6–1	UEFA Women's Euro 2001 qualifying
29	17 August 2000	Kópavogsvöllur, Kópavogur, Iceland	Iceland	3–0	6–0	UEFA Women's Euro 2001 qualifying
30	17 August 2000	Kópavogsvöllur, Kópavogur, Iceland	Iceland	4–0	6–0	UEFA Women's Euro 2001 qualifying
31	16 September 2000	Bruce Stadium, Canberra, Australia	Brazil	1–0	2–1	2000 Summer Olympics
32	16 September 2000	Bruce Stadium, Canberra, Australia	Brazil	2–0	2–1	2000 Summer Olympics
33	28 September 2000	Sydney Football Stadium, Sydney, Australia	Brazil	2–0	2–0	2000 Summer Olympics
34	27 August 2000	Old Tivoli, Aachen, Germany	Denmark	3–0	7–0	Friendly
35	8 March 2001	Donaustadion, Ulm, Germany	China	2–3	2–4	Friendly
36	17 June 2001	Niederrheinstadion, Oberhausen, Germany	Canada	4–0	7–1	Friendly
37	27 June 2001	Steigerwaldstadion, Erfurt, Germany	Russia	2–0	5–0	UEFA Women's Euro 2001
38	17 November 2001	De Grolsch Veste, Enschede, Netherlands	Netherlands	2–0	3–0	2003 FIFA Women's World Cup qualifying
39	27 January 2002	Guangdong Provincial People's Stadium, Guangzhou, China	Norway	2–1	3–1	Friendly
40	18 April 2002	Stadion am Schönbusch, Aschaffenburg, Germany	Netherlands	3–0	6–0	2003 FIFA Women's World Cup qualifying
41	18 April 2002	Stadion am Schönbusch, Aschaffenburg, Germany	Netherlands	4–0	6–0	2003 FIFA Women's World Cup qualifying
42	18 April 2002	Stadion am Schönbusch, Aschaffenburg, Germany	Netherlands	5–0	6–0	2003 FIFA Women's World Cup qualifying
43	4 May 2002	Estádio Adelino Ribeiro Novo, Barcelos, Portugal	Portugal	8–0	8–0	2003 FIFA Women's World Cup qualifying
44	17 October 2002	Donaustadion, Ulm, Germany	Denmark	1–0	2–0	Friendly
45	14 November 2002	Nattenberg Stadion, Lüdenscheid, Germany	Russia	1–0	4–0	Friendly
46	27 March 2003	Karl-Liebknecht-Stadion, Potsdam, Germany	Scotland	1–0	5–0	UEFA Women's Euro 2005 qualifying
47	27 March 2003	Karl-Liebknecht-Stadion, Potsdam, Germany	Scotland	5–0	5–0	UEFA Women's Euro 2005 qualifying
48	22 May 2003	Friedrich-Ludwig-Jahn-Sportpark, Prenzlauer Berg, Germany	Denmark	1–0	1–1	Friendly
49	25 May 2003	Haderslev Football Stadium, Haderslev, Denmark	Denmark	2–2	6–2	Friendly
50	25 May 2003	Haderslev Football Stadium, Haderslev, Denmark	Denmark	3–2	6–2	Friendly
51	25 May 2003	Haderslev Football Stadium, Haderslev, Denmark	Denmark	6–2	6–2	Friendly
52	28 August 2003	Dreiflüssestadion, Passau, Germany	Czech Republic	3–0	4–0	UEFA Women's Euro 2005 qualifying
53	11 September 2003	Merck-Stadion am Böllenfalltor, Darmstadt, Germany	England	1–0	4–0	Friendly
54	11 September 2003	Merck-Stadion am Böllenfalltor, Darmstadt, Germany	England	2–0	4–0	Friendly
55	20 September 2003	Mapfre Stadium, Columbus, United States	Canada	3–1	4–1	2003 FIFA Women's World Cup
56	24 September 2003	Mapfre Stadium, Columbus, United States	Japan	2–0	3–0	2003 FIFA Women's World Cup
57	24 September 2003	Mapfre Stadium, Columbus, United States	Japan	3–0	3–0	2003 FIFA Women's World Cup
58	27 September 2003	RFK Stadium, Washington, D.C., United States	Argentina	4–0	6–1	2003 FIFA Women's World Cup
59	2 October 2003	Providence Park, Portland, United States	Russia	6–1	7–1	2003 FIFA Women's World Cup
60	2 October 2003	Providence Park, Portland, United States	Russia	7–1	7–1	2003 FIFA Women's World Cup
61	5 October 2003	Providence Park, Portland, United States	United States	3–0	3–0	2003 FIFA Women's World Cup
62	15 November 2003	Stadion an der Kreuzeiche, Reutlingen, Germany	Portugal	4–0	13–0	UEFA Women's Euro 2005 qualifying
63	15 November 2003	Stadion an der Kreuzeiche, Reutlingen, Germany	Portugal	6–0	13–0	UEFA Women's Euro 2005 qualifying
64	15 November 2003	Stadion an der Kreuzeiche, Reutlingen, Germany	Portugal	7–0	13–0	UEFA Women's Euro 2005 qualifying
65	15 November 2003	Stadion an der Kreuzeiche, Reutlingen, Germany	Portugal	9–0	13–0	UEFA Women's Euro 2005 qualifying
66	7 February 2004	Estádio Municipal de Albufeira, Albufeira, Portugal	Portugal	1–0	11–0	UEFA Women's Euro 2005 qualifying
67	7 February 2004	Estádio Municipal de Albufeira, Albufeira, Portugal	Portugal	4–0	11–0	UEFA Women's Euro 2005 qualifying
68	7 February 2004	Estádio Municipal de Albufeira, Albufeira, Portugal	Portugal	10–0	11–0	UEFA Women's Euro 2005 qualifying
69	31 March 2004	Stadio Druso, Bolzano, Italy	Italy	1–0	1–0	Friendly
70	28 April 2004	Marschweg-Stadion, Oldenburg, Germany	Ukraine	1–0	6–0	UEFA Women's Euro 2005 qualifying
71	28 April 2004	Marschweg-Stadion, Oldenburg, Germany	Ukraine	5–0	6–0	UEFA Women's Euro 2005 qualifying
72	2 May 2004	Almondvale Stadium, Livingston, Scotland	Scotland	2–1	3–1	UEFA Women's Euro 2005 qualifying
73	24 July 2004	Stadion am Bieberer Berg, Offenbach am Main, Germany	Nigeria	2–0	3–1	Friendly
74	11 August 2004	Pampeloponnisiako Stadium, Patras, Greece	China	1–0	8–0	2004 Summer Olympics
75	11 August 2004	Pampeloponnisiako Stadium, Patras, Greece	China	2–0	8–0	2004 Summer Olympics
76	11 August 2004	Pampeloponnisiako Stadium, Patras, Greece	China	4–0	8–0	2004 Summer Olympics
77	11 August 2004	Pampeloponnisiako Stadium, Patras, Greece	China	7–0	8–0	2004 Summer Olympics
78	17 August 2004	Karaiskakis Stadium, Piraeus, Greece	Mexico	2–0	2–0	2004 Summer Olympics
79	25 September 2004	Na Litavce, Příbram, Czechia	Czech Republic	2–0	5–0	UEFA Women's Euro 2005 qualifying
80	9 March 2005	Municipal de Lagos, Lagos, Portugal	Sweden	2–0	2–1	2005 Algarve Cup
81	11 March 2005	Providence Park, Dr. Francisco Vieira Stadium, Silves, Portugal	Norway	2–0	4–0	2005 Algarve Cup
82	11 March 2005	Providence Park, Dr. Francisco Vieira Stadium, Silves, Portugal	Norway	3–0	4–0	2005 Algarve Cup
83	21 April 2005	Stadion an der Bremer Brücke, Osnabrück, Germany	Canada	2–1	3–1	Friendly
84	9 June 2005	Deepdale, Preston, England	Italy	1–0	4–0	UEFA Women's Euro 2005
85	15 June 2005	Deepdale, Preston, England	Finland	4–1	4–1	UEFA Women's Euro 2005
86	19 June 2005	Ewood Park, Blackburn, England	Norway	3–1	3–1	UEFA Women's Euro 2005
87	4 September 2005	Commonwealth Stadium, Edmonton, Canada	Canada	4–2	4–3	Friendly
88	25 September 2005	Leimbachstadion, Siegen, Germany	Russia	4–1	5–1	2007 FIFA Women's World Cup qualifying
89	20 October 2005	Hans-Walter-Wild-Stadion, Bayreuth, Germany	Scotland	3–0	4–0	2007 FIFA Women's World Cup qualifying
90	20 October 2005	Hans-Walter-Wild-Stadion, Bayreuth, Germany	Scotland	4–0	4–0	2007 FIFA Women's World Cup qualifying
91	9 March 2006	Estádio Algarve, Portugal	Finland	2–0	5–0	2006 Algarve Cup
92	11 March 2006	Estádio Algarve, Portugal	Sweden	1–0	3–0	2006 Algarve Cup
93	3 August 2006	Grotenburg-Stadion, Krefeld, Germany	Italy	1–0	5–0	Friendly
94	3 August 2006	Grotenburg-Stadion, Krefeld, Germany	Italy	2–0	5–0	Friendly
95	26 August 2006	Richmond Park, Dublin, Ireland	Republic of Ireland	2–0	3–0	2007 FIFA Women's World Cup qualifying
96	30 August 2006	Stadion Breite, Schaffhausen, Switzerland	Switzerland	2–0	6–0	2007 FIFA Women's World Cup qualifying
97	23 September 2006	McDiarmid Park, Perth, Scotland	Scotland	1–0	5–0	2007 FIFA Women's World Cup qualifying
98	23 September 2006	McDiarmid Park, Perth, Scotland	Scotland	4–0	5–0	2007 FIFA Women's World Cup qualifying
99	27 September 2006	Eduard Streltsov Stadium, Moscow, Russia	Russia	3–0	3–2	2007 FIFA Women's World Cup qualifying
100	25 October 2006	Städtisches Waldstadion, Aalen, Germany	England	3–1	5–1	Friendly
101	23 November 2006	Wildparkstadion, Karlsruhe, Germany	Japan	2–0	6–3	Friendly
102	12 April 2007	Lohrheidestadion, Bochum, Germany	Netherlands	1–1	5–1	UEFA Women's Euro 2009 qualifying
103	10 May 2007	Bridge Meadow Stadium, Haverfordwest, Wales	Wales	1–0	6–0	UEFA Women's Euro 2009 qualifying
104	10 May 2007	Bridge Meadow Stadium, Haverfordwest, Wales	Wales	2–0	6–0	UEFA Women's Euro 2009 qualifying
105	10 May 2007	Bridge Meadow Stadium, Haverfordwest, Wales	Wales	6–0	6–0	UEFA Women's Euro 2009 qualifying
106	29 July 2007	MDCC-Arena, Magdeburg, Germany	Denmark	2–0	4–0	Friendly
107	2 August 2007	Stadion der Freundschaft, Gera, Germany	Czech Republic	1–0	5–0	Friendly
108	2 August 2007	Stadion der Freundschaft, Gera, Germany	Czech Republic	5–0	5–0	Friendly
109	22 August 2007	Stadion Oberwerth, Koblenz, Germany	Switzerland	3–0	7–0	UEFA Women's Euro 2009 qualifying
110	30 August 2007	Bruchwegstadion, Mainz, Germany	Norway	2–0	2–2	Friendly
111	10 September 2007	Hongkou Football Stadium, Shanghai, China	Argentina	4–0	11–0	2007 FIFA Women's World Cup
112	10 September 2007	Hongkou Football Stadium, Shanghai, China	Argentina	5–0	11–0	2007 FIFA Women's World Cup
113	10 September 2007	Hongkou Football Stadium, Shanghai, China	Argentina	8–0	11–0	2007 FIFA Women's World Cup
114	17 September 2007	Yellow Dragon Sports Center, Hangzhou, China	Japan	1–0	2–0	2007 FIFA Women's World Cup
115	30 September 2007	Hongkou Football Stadium, Shanghai, China	Brazil	1–0	2–0	2007 FIFA Women's World Cup
116	28 October 2007	Stadion Lohmühle, Lübeck, Germany	Belgium	3–0	3–0	UEFA Women's Euro 2009 qualifying
117	28 February 2008	Dreisamstadion, Freiburg im Breisgau, Germany	China	1–0	2–0	Friendly
118	7 March 2008	Estádio Algarve, Portugal	Finland	1–0	3–0	2008 Algarve Cup
119	7 March 2008	Estádio Algarve, Portugal	Finland	2–0	3–0	2008 Algarve Cup
120	10 March 2008	Municipal Stadium, Vila Real de Santo António, Portugal	Sweden	2–0	2–0	2008 Algarve Cup
121	17 July 2008	Alpenbauer Sportpark, Unterhaching, Germany	England	2–0	3–0	Friendly
122	18 August 2008	Shanghai Stadium, Shanghai, China	Brazil	1–0	1–5	2008 Summer Olympics
123	25 July 2009	Rhein-Neckar-Arena, Sinsheim, Germany	Netherlands	4–0	6–0	Friendly
124	10 September 2009	Olympic Stadium, Helsinki, Finland	England	1–0	6–2	UEFA Women's Euro 2009
125	10 September 2009	Olympic Stadium, Helsinki, Finland	England	6–2	6–2	UEFA Women's Euro 2009
126	24 February 2010	Complexo Desportivo Belavista, Parchal, Portugal	Denmark	2–0	4–0	2010 Algarve Cup
127	25 November 2010	BayArena, Leverkusen, Germany	Nigeria	4–0	8–0	Friendly
128	25 November 2010	BayArena, Leverkusen, Germany	Nigeria	5–0	8–0	Friendly

=== At World Cup and Olympic Tournaments ===
Prinz competed in five FIFA Women's World Cup: Sweden 1995, USA 1999, USA 2003, China 2007 and Germany 2011; and four Olympics: Atlanta 1996, Sydney 2000, Athens 2004, and Beijing 2008. Altogether she played in 43 matches and scored 24 goals at those nine global tournaments. With Germany, Prinz is a two-time world champion from USA 2003 and China 2007, and a runner-up from Sweden 1995, as well as a three-time bronze medalist from Sydney 2000, Athens 2004 and Beijing 2008.

Key (expand for notes on "world cup and olympic goals")
Location	Geographic location of the venue where the competition occurred
Lineup	Start – played entire match on minute (off player) – substituted on at the minute indicated, and player was substituted off at the same time off minute (on player) – substituted off at the minute indicated, and player was substituted on at the same time (c) – captain
Min	The minute in the match the goal was scored. For list that include caps, blank indicates played in the match but did not score a goal.
Assist/pass	The ball was passed by the player, which assisted in scoring the goal. This column depends on the availability and source of this information.
penalty or pk	Goal scored on penalty-kick which was awarded due to foul by opponent. (Goals scored in penalty-shoot-out, at the end of a tied match after extra-time, are not included.)
Score	The match score after the goal was scored.
Result	The final score. W – match was won L – match was lost to opponent D – match was drawn (W) – penalty-shoot-out was won after a drawn match (L) – penalty-shoot-out was lost after a drawn match
aet	The score at the end of extra-time; the match was tied at the end of 90' regulation
pso	Penalty-shoot-out score shown in parentheses; the match was tied at the end of extra-time
	Pink background color – Olympic women's football tournament
	Blue background color – FIFA women's world cup final tournament

Goal	Match	Date	Location	Opponent	Lineup	Min	Score	Result	Competition
Sweden 1995 FIFA Women's World Cup Final
	1	1995-06-05	Karlstad	Japan	on 65' (off Tecklenburg)			1–0 W	Group stage
	2	1995-06-07	Helsingborg	Sweden	on 57' (off Brocker)			2–3 L	Group stage
1	3	1995-06-09	Karlstad	Brazil	Start	5	1–0	6–1 W	Group stage
	4	1995-06-13	Västerås	England	off 67' (on Brocker)			3–0 W	Quarter-final
	5	1995-06-15	Helsingborg	China	off 83' (on Wunderlich)			1–0 W	Semifinal
	6	1995-06-18	Solna	Norway	off 42' (on Brocker)			0–2 L	Final
(United States) Atlanta 1996 Olympic Women's Football Tournament
	7	1996-07-21	Birmingham, AL	Japan	on 53' (off Brocker)			3–2 W	Group match
2	8	1996-07-23	Washington, D.C.	Norway	on 52' (off Brocker)	62	2–2	2–3 L	Group match
	9	1996-07-25	Birmingham, AL	Brazil	on 42' (off Brocker)			1–1 D	Group match
(United States) USA 1999 FIFA Women's World Cup
	10	1999-06-20	Los Angeles	Italy	Start			1–1 D	Group match
	11	1999-06-24	Portland, OR	Mexico	off 75' (on Mueller)			6–0 W	Group match
3	12	1999-06-27	Washington, D.C.	Brazil	Start	8	1–0	3–3 D	Group match
	13	1999-07-01	Washington, D.C.	United States	Start			2–3 L	Quarter-final
(Australia) Sydney 2000 Olympic Women's Football Tournament
	14	2000-09-13	Canberra	Australia	Start			3–0 W	Group match
4	15	2000-09-16	Canberra	Brazil	Start	33	1–0	2–1 W	Group match
5	15	2000-09-16	Canberra	Brazil	Start	41	2–0	2–1 W	Group match
	16	2000-09-19	Melbourne	Sweden	Start			1–0 W	Group match
	17	2000-09-24	Sydney	Norway	Start			0–1 L	Semifinal
6	18	2000-09-28	Sydney	Brazil	Start	79	2–0	2–0 W	Bronze medal match
(United States) USA 2003 FIFA Women's World Cup
7	19	2003-09-20	Columbus, OH	Canada	Start	75	3–1	4–1 W	Group match
8	20	2003-09-24 (Note: "FIFA Women's World Cup USA 2003: MATCH Report: Germany – Japan : Group matches". FIFA.)	Columbus, OH	Japan	Start	36	2–0	3–0 W	Group match
9	20	2003-09-24	Columbus, OH	Japan	Start	66	3–0	3–0 W	Group match
10	21	2003-09-27	Washington, D.C.	Argentina	Start	32	3–0	6–1 W	Group match
11	22	2003-10-02	Portland, OR	Russia	Start	80	5–1	7–1 W	Quarter-final
12	22	2003-10-02	Portland, OR	Russia	Start	89	7–1	7–1 W	Quarter-final
13	23	2003-10-05	Portland, OR	United States	Start	90+3	3–0	3–0 W	Semifinal
	24	2003-10-12	Carson, CA	Sweden	Start			2–1 aet W	Final
(Greece) Athens 2004 Women's Olympic Football Tournament
14	25	2004-08-11	Patras	China	Start	13	1–0	8–0 W	Group match
15	25	2004-08-11	Patras	China	Start	21	2–0	8–0 W	Group match
16	25	2004-08-11	Patras	China	Start	73	4–0	8–0 W	Group match
17	25	2004-08-11	Patras	China	Start	88	7–0	8–0 W	Group match
18	26	2004-08-17	Piraeus	Mexico	Start; (c)	79	2–0	2–0 W	Group match
	27	2004-08-20	Patras	Nigeria	Start; (c)			2–1 W	Quarter-final
	28	2004-08-23	Heraklion	United States	Start; (c)			1–2 L	Semifinal
	29	2004-08-26	Piraeus	Sweden	Start; (c)			1–0 W	Bronze medal match
China 2007 FIFA Women's World Cup
19	30	2007-09-10	Shanghai	Argentina	Start; (c)	29	4–0	11–0 W	Group match
20	30	2007-09-10	Shanghai	Argentina	Start; (c)	45+1	5–0	11–0 W	Group match
21	30	2007-09-10	Shanghai	Argentina	Start; (c)	59	8–0	11–0 W	Group match
	31	2007-09-14	Shanghai	England	Start; (c)			0–0 D	Group match
22	32	2007-09-17	Hangzhou	Japan	Start; (c)	21	1–0	2–0 W	Group match
	33	2007-09-22	Wuhan	Korea DPR	Start; (c)			3–0 W	Quarter-final
	34	2007-09-26	Tianjin	Norway	Start; (c)			3–0 W	Semifinal
23	35	2007-09-30	Shanghai	Brazil	Start; (c)	52	1–0	2–0 W	Final
(China) Beijing 2008 Women's Olympic Football Tournament
	36	2008-08-06	Shenyang	Brazil	Start; (c)			0–0 D	Group match
	37	2008-08-09	Shenyang	Nigeria	Start; (c)			1–0 W	Group match
	38	2008-08-12	Tianjin	Korea DPR	Start; (c)			1–0 W	Group match
	39	2008-08-15	Shenyang	Sweden	Start; (c)			2–0 aet W	Quarter-final
24	40	2008-08-18	Shanghai	Brazil	Start; (c)	10	1–0	1–4 L	Semifinal
	41	2008-08-21	Beijing	Japan	Start; (c)			2–0 W	Bronze medal match
Germany 2011 FIFA Women's World Cup
	42	2011-06-26	Berlin	Canada	off 56' (on Popp); (c)			2–1 W	Group match
	43	2011-06-30	Frankfurt	Nigeria	off 53' (on Grings); (c)			1–0 W	Group match

== Honours ==
FSV Frankfurt

- Bundesliga: 1994–95, 1997–98
- German Cup: 1994–95, 1995–96

1. FFC Frankfurt

- UEFA Women's Cup: 2001–02, 2005–06, 2007–08; runner-up 2003–04
- Bundesliga (7): 1998–99, 2000–01, 2001–02, 2002–03, 2004–05, 2006–07, 2007–08
- German Cup (8): 1998–99, 1999-00, 2000–01, 2001–02, 2002–03, 2006–07, 2007–08, 2010–11

Germany

- WUSA Championship: 2002
- FIFA World Cup: 2003, 2007; runner-up 1995
- UEFA European Championship: 1995, 1997, 2001, 2005, 2009
- Olympic bronze medal: 2000, 2004, 2008
- Algarve Cup: 2006

Individual

- FIFA World Player of the Year: 2003, 2004, 2005; runner-up 2002, 2007, 2008, 2009, 2010
- German Player of the Year (8): 2001, 2002, 2003, 2004, 2005, 2006, 2007, 2008
- UEFA Women's Championship Golden Player: 1995
- Second all-time leading goalscorer FIFA Women's World Cup – 14 goals (second to Marta)
- Second all-time leading goalscorer Women's Olympic Football Tournament – 10 goals (second to Cristiane)
- Golden Ball: 2003 FIFA Women's World Cup
- FIFA Women's World Cup top scorer: 2003
- 2003 FIFA Women's World Cup All star team: 2003
- Silver Ball: 2007 FIFA Women's World Cup
- 2007 FIFA Women's World Cup All star team: 2007
- Bundesliga top scorer: 1996–97, 1997–98, 2000–01, 2006–07
- Silbernes Lorbeerblatt: 2003, 2007

== See also ==
- List of women footballers with 300 or more goals
- List of women's footballers with 100 or more international goals
- List of women's footballers with 100 or more international caps
- List of players who have won multiple FIFA Women's World Cups
- List of German women's football champions
- List of FIFA Women's World Cup hat-tricks
- List of Olympic medalists in football
- List of UEFA Women's Championship goalscorers
- List of UEFA Women's Championship records
