= List of women footballers with 500 or more goals =

In women's association football competitions, 29 players have scored 500 or more goals over the course of their career in both club and international football, according to research by Independent Football Data (IFD), an organisation run independently by an Englishman. FIFA, the international governing body of football, has never released a list detailing the highest women's goalscorers, and does not keep official records.

== Footballers with 500 or more goals ==
As of 21 June 2026 - Time 14:24 Bold indicates players currently active. + indicates player may have scored and played more.
Rank	Player	Goals	Matches	Ratio	Career span
1	(England) Lily Parr	986	432+	2.28	1919–1951
2	(Israel) Silvi Jan	976 (Note: Jan scored 1,010 goals in her career, however only 976 of these goals were official)	315	3.1	1995–2012
3	(Albania) **Megi Doçi**	948	458	2.06	2010–
4	(Sweden) Ann Jansson	876	679	1.29	1972–1984
5	(Estonia) Anastassia Morkovkina	856	492+	1.74	1995–2017
6	(Italy) Patrizia Panico	763	795	0.96	1993–2016
7	(Faroe Islands) Rannvá Andreasen	748	676	1.11	1995–2023
8	(Hungary) Anita Pádár	707	479+	1.48	1993–2016
9	(Italy) Carolina Morace	655+	385+	1.7	1978–1998
10	(Paraguay) Irma Cuevas	639	?	—	1997–2023
11	(Scotland) Julie Fleeting	629+	331+	1.9	1996–2016
12	(Austria) Maria Gstöttner	604+	546+	1.11	1998–2022
13	(Denmark) Susanne Augustesen	604	267+	2.26	1970–1995
14	(Germany) Inka Grings	579+	496+	1.17	1995–2014
15	(Italy) Elisabetta Vignotto	574	570	1.01	1971–1990
16	(Slovenia) **Mateja Zver**	571	679	0.84	2001–
17	(Iceland) Margrét Lára Viðarsdóttir	557	540	1.03	2000–2019
18	(Austria) Nina Burger	547+	451+	1.21	2001–2021
19	(Cyprus) **Krystyna Freda**	528	332	1.61	2011–
20	(Hungary) **Fanny Vágó**	524	581	0.9	2006–
21	(Germany) Birgit Prinz	521	643	0.81	1993–2011
22	(England) Karen Walker	521	290	1.8	1985–2006
23	(Brazil) **Marta**	519	779	0.67	2000–
24	(Italy) **Daniela Sabatino**	516	761	0.68	2002–
25	(Botswana) **Thuto Ramafifi**	510	?	—	2008–
26	(Georgia (country)) **Gulnara Gabelia**	508	225+	2.26	2009–2026
27	(Croatia) **Monika Conjar**	507	318	1.59	2011–
28	(Faroe Islands) **Heidi Sevdal**	505	505	1	2005–
29	(Croatia) **Izabela Lojna**	505	495	1.02	2009–

Notes: + indicates that there may be more matches and goals.

== See also ==
- List of women's footballers with 100 or more international goals
- List of top international men's football goalscorers by country
- List of footballers who achieved hat-trick records
- List of world association football records
- List of goalscoring goalkeepers
- Lists of hat-tricks in football
