= Ángeles Parejo =

Spanish footballer (born 1969)

Personal information
- Full name: María Ángeles Parejo Jiménez
- Date of birth: 22 March 1969 (age 57)
- Place of birth: Terrassa, Spain
- Height: 1.71 m (5 ft 7 in)
- Position: Striker

Senior career*
Years	Team	Apps	(Gls)
- Sabadell
1988–1990	Torino	40	(19)
1990–2003	Torres	305	(288)
1998	→ Takarazuka Bunny (loan)	15	(18)
2003–2005	Atletico Oristano		(49)
2005–2006	Olbia		(21)
2006–2009	Roma CF		(44)
2009–2010	Reggiana	21	(20)
2010–2011	Torres	23	(10)

International career
1988–1999	Spain	14	(5)
- * Club domestic league appearances and goals

María Ángeles Parejo Jiménez is a Spanish former football striker who developed her career in Italy's Serie A, playing for ACF Torino, Torres CF, Atlético Oristano, Olbia CF, Roma CF and Reggiana between 1988 and 2011. She also played for Takarazuka Bunny in Japan's L. League. Her best season was 1997–98, when she scored 38 goals in 23 matches.

She was a member of the Spain women's national football team, and played the 1997 European Championship where she scored 3 goals to help Spain reach the semifinals. She was included in the competition's all-star team.

== Career statistics ==
List of international goals scored by Ángeles Parejo
No.	Date	Venue	Opponent	Score	Result	Competition
1	2 May 1990	Spiegelfeld, Binningen, Switzerland	Switzerland	2–1	2–1	1997 UEFA Women's Championship Qualification
2	29 June 1997	Nobelstadion, Karlskoga, Sweden	France	0–1	1–1	1997 UEFA Women's Championship
3	5 July 1997	Nobelstadion, Karlskoga, Sweden	Russia	0–1	0–1	1997 UEFA Women's Championship
4	9 July 1997	Åråsen Stadion, Lillestrøm, Norway	Italy	2–1	2–1	1997 UEFA Women's Championship
5	16 May 1998	La Route de Lorient, Rennes, France	France	2–1	3–2	Friendly
