= Hanna Ljungberg =

Swedish footballer (born 1979)

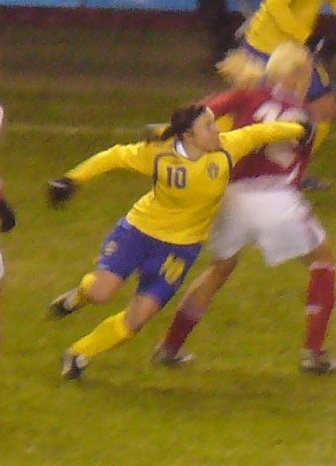
- Hanna Ljungberg playing for Sweden against Denmark in November 2007

Personal information
- Full name: Hanna Carolina Ljungberg
- Date of birth: 8 January 1979 (age 47)
- Place of birth: Umeå, Sweden
- Height: 1.60 m (5 ft 3 in)
- Position: Forward

Youth career
- 1986–1994: Mariehem SK

Senior career*
Years	Team	Apps	(Gls)
1994–1998	Sunnanå SK		
1998–2009	Umeå IK	227	(196)

International career
1995	Sweden U17	9	(2)
1995–1996	Sweden U23	3	(0)
1996–2008	Sweden	130	(72)
- * Club domestic league appearances and goals

Hanna Carolina Ljungberg (born 8 January 1979) is a Swedish former association football forward. She spent the majority of her club career at Umeå IK and was a Swedish international from 1996 to 2008.

== Club career ==
From 1998 to 2009, Ljungberg made 227 appearances and scored 196 goals for Umeå IK in the Damallsvenskan, winning the Diamond Ball (Diamantbollen) in 2002. She also scored a record-setting number of goals that season with 39 goals (roughly 1.78 per game). In the 70th minute of a cup match against AIK on 17 May 2007, Carola Söberg's injury forced Ljungberg to play in goal. Fortunately, Umeå IK held on to their clean sheet.

== International career ==
Ljungberg debuted for Sweden on 6 February 1996 in an 8-0 win over Spain at age 17. As a highly prolific striker, she was instrumental in the Swedish side that were runners-up at the 2003 FIFA Women's World Cup held in the United States, scoring three goals and assisting one more. She was also voted as the third-best World Player of the Year by FIFA in 2003. Until October 2014, when she was surpassed by Lotta Schelin, Ljungberg was the goal leader of the Swedish national team with 72 goals. During the UEFA Women's Cup 2002-03, Ljungberg was the top goalscorer in the tournament with 10 goals. Italian men's football club Perugia contacted Ljungberg to hire her for their Serie A roster, but the deal was aborted.

== Retirement ==
In August 2009, Ljungberg announced her retirement after a knee injury in a league match on 5 July. Her right anterior cruciate ligament, previously reconstructed in 2004, was again partly torn and she decided with her doctors that to continue to play presented too high a risk of permanent disability. Later on, she helped Joakim Blomqvist and his assistant Maria Bergkvist in the coaching of her old team. At the same time, Ljungberg was studying at Umeå University to become a physiotherapist and graduated in June 2012.

== Personal life ==
Ljungberg is not related to Freddie Ljungberg. She appeared in the Sveriges Television documentary television series The Other Sport from 2013 and was also depicted on a stamp commemorating the Swedish Football Association's 100th anniversary.

== Matches and goals scored at major tournaments ==
Ljungberg featured for Sweden at three World Cups (USA 1999, USA 2003, China 2007) and three Olympic Games (Athens 1996, Sydney 2000, Athens 2004.) She scored Sweden's lone goal in the 2003 World Cup Final, where Sweden lost to Germany for a second place finish.

Key (expand for notes on "world cup and olympic goals")
Location	Geographic location of the venue where the competition occurred
Lineup	Start – played entire match on minute (off player) – substituted on at the minute indicated, and player was substituted off at the same time off minute (on player) – substituted off at the minute indicated, and player was substituted on at the same time (c) – captain
Min	The minute in the match the goal was scored. For list that include caps, blank indicates played in the match but did not score a goal.
Assist/pass	The ball was passed by the player, which assisted in scoring the goal. This column depends on the availability and source of this information.
penalty or pk	Goal scored on penalty-kick which was awarded due to foul by opponent. (Goals scored in penalty-shoot-out, at the end of a tied match after extra-time, are not included.)
Score	The match score after the goal was scored.
Result	The final score. W – match was won L – match was lost to opponent D – match was drawn (W) – penalty-shoot-out was won after a drawn match (L) – penalty-shoot-out was lost after a drawn match
aet	The score at the end of extra-time; the match was tied at the end of 90' regulation
pso	Penalty-shoot-out score shown in parentheses; the match was tied at the end of extra-time
	Pink background color – Olympic women's football tournament
	Blue background color – FIFA women's world cup final tournament

Goal	Match	Date	Location	Opponent	Lineup	Min	Score	Result	Competition
(United States) Atlanta 1996 Women's Olympic Football Tournament
	1	1996-7-21	Miami	China	on 71' (off Kalte)			0–2 L	Group match
	2	1996-7-23	Orlando	United States	on 56' (off Carlsson)			1–2 L	Group match
(United States) USA 1999 FIFA Women's World Cup
	3	1999-6-19	San Jose	China	Start			1–2 L	Group match
1	4	1999-6-23	Washington, DC	Australia	Start	21	2-0	3–1 W	Group match
2	4	1999-6-23	Washington, DC	Australia	Start	69	3-1	3–1 W	Group match
	5	1999-6-26	Chicago	Ghana	off 6' (on Lundin)			2–0 W	Group match
(Australia) Sydney 2000 Women's Olympic Football Tournament
	6	2000-9-13	Melbourne	Brazil	Start			0–2 L	Group match
	7	2000-9-16	Sydney	Australia	Start			1–1 D	Group match
	8	2000-9-19	Melbourne	Germany	Start			0–1 L	Group match
(United States) USA 2003 FIFA Women's World Cup
	9	2003-9-21	Washington, DC	United States	off 83' (on Öqvist)			1–3 L	Group match
	10	2003-9-25	Philadelphia	North Korea	off 86' (on Öqvist)			1–0 W	Group match
3	11	2003-9-28	Columbus	Nigeria	Start	56	1-0	3–0 W	Group match
4	11	2003-9-28	Columbus	Nigeria	Start	79	2-0	3–0 W	Group match
	12	2003-10-1	Foxborough	Brazil	Start			2–1 W	Quarter Final
	13	2003-10-5	Portland	Canada	Start			2–1 W	Semi-Final
5	14	2003-10-12	Carson	Germany	Start	41	1-0	1–2 L	Final
(Greece) Athens 2004 Women's Olympic Football Tournament
	15	2004-8-11	Volos	Japan	off 68' (on Öqvist)			0–1 L	Group match
	16	2004-8-17	Volos	Nigeria	off 80' (on Fagerström)			2–1 W	Group match
6	17	2004-8-20	Volos	Australia	off 77' (on Fagerström)	25	1-0	2–1 W	Quarter-Final
	18	2004-8-23	Patras	Brazil	Start			0–1 L	Semi Final
	19	2004-8-26	Piraeus	Germany	Start			0–1 L	Bronze Medal Match
China 2007 FIFA Women's World Cup
	20	2007-9-11	Chengdu	Nigeria	off 69' (on Johansson)			1–1 D	Group match
	21	2007-9-14	Chengdu	United States	Start			0–2 L	Group match
	22	2007-9-18	Tianjin	North Korea	off 40' (on Thunebro)			2–1 W	Group match

== Matches and goals scored at European Championship tournaments ==
Hanna Ljungberg appeared at three European Championship tournaments: Norway/Sweden 1997, Germany 2001, and England 2005. In the 2005 Semi-Final, she scored twice against Norway, erasing Norwegian leads each time. Her second goal in the 89th minute knotted the score at 2-2 and forced extra time. Sweden could not find a match winner though, and exited the tournament in a 2-3 defeat.

Goal	Match	Date	Location	Opponent	Lineup	Min	Score	Result	Competition
(Norway) (Sweden) 1997 European Championship
1	1	1997-6-29	Karlstad	Russia	off 46'	10	1-0	2–1 W	Group match
	2	1997-7-2	Karlskoga	Spain	off 46'			1–0 W	Group match
	3	1997-7-5	Karlstad	France	off 45' (on Jonsson)			3–0 W	Group match
(Germany) 2001 European Championship
2	4	2001-6-23	Erfurt	Germany	Start	14	1-0	1–3 L	Group match
3	5	2001-6-27	Jena	England	Start	74	3-0	4–0 W	Group match
	6	2001-6-30	Erfurt	Russia	Start			1–0 W	Group match
	7	2001-7-4	Ulm	Denmark	Start			1–0 W	Semi-Final
	8	2001-7-7	Ulm	Germany	Start			0–1 L	Final
(England) 2005 European Championship
4	9	2005-6-5	Blackpool	Denmark	Start	21	1-0	1–1 D	Group match
	10	2005-6-8	Blackpool	Finland	Start			0–0 D	Group match
	11	2005-6-11	Blackburn	England	Start			1–0 W	Group match
5	12	2005-6-16	Warrington	Norway	Start	42	1-1	2–3 L	Semi-Final
6	12	2005-6-16	Warrington	Norway	Start	89	2-2	2–3 L	Semi-Final

== International goals ==
No.	Date	Venue	Opponent	Score	Result	Competition	Ref.
1.	2 June 1996	Gandia, Spain	Spain	6–0	8–0	UEFA Women's Euro 1997 qualifying	
2.	29 June 1997	Karlstad, Sweden	Russia	1–0	2–1	UEFA Women's Euro 1997	
3.	21 March 1998	Quarteira, Portugal	United States	1–0	1–3	1998 Algarve Cup	
4.	3 May 1998	Motril, Spain	Spain	2–1	2–1	1999 FIFA Women's World Cup qualification	
5.	8 August 1998	Kyiv, Ukraine	Ukraine	2–0	5–0	1999 FIFA Women's World Cup qualification	
6.	23 June 1999	Landover, United States	Australia	2–0	3–1	1999 FIFA Women's World Cup	
7.	23 June 1999	Landover, United States	Australia	3–1	3–1	1999 FIFA Women's World Cup	
8.	29 September 1999	Umeå, Sweden	France	2–2	2–2	UEFA Women's Euro 2001 qualifying	
9.	7 November 1999	Plasencia, Spain	Spain	2–0	5–2	UEFA Women's Euro 2001 qualifying	
10.	7 November 1999	Plasencia, Spain	Spain	3–1	5–2	UEFA Women's Euro 2001 qualifying	
11.	7 January 2000	Sydney, Australia	Australia	1–0	2–0	2000 Australia Cup	
12.	13 January 2000	Adelaide, Australia	Czech Republic	2–0	2–0	2000 Australia Cup	
13.	18 October 2000	Jönköping, Sweden	Finland	3–0	5–1	UEFA Women's Euro 2001 qualifying	
14.	18 October 2000	Jönköping, Sweden	Finland	4–0	5–1	UEFA Women's Euro 2001 qualifying	
15.	18 October 2000	Jönköping, Sweden	Finland	5–1	5–1	UEFA Women's Euro 2001 qualifying	
16.	5 November 2000	Vantaa, Finland	Finland	3–2	5–2	UEFA Women's Euro 2001 qualifying	
17.	5 November 2000	Vantaa, Finland	Finland	4–2	5–2	UEFA Women's Euro 2001 qualifying	
18.	11 March 2001	Lagos, Portugal	Portugal	2–1	4–1	2001 Algarve Cup	
19.	13 March 2001	Silves, Portugal	Canada	1–0	5–2	2001 Algarve Cup	
20.	13 March 2001	Silves, Portugal	Canada	3–0	5–2	2001 Algarve Cup	
21.	13 March 2001	Silves, Portugal	Canada	4–1	5–2	2001 Algarve Cup	
22.	15 March 2001	Albufeira, Portugal	United States	2–0	2–0	2001 Algarve Cup	
23.	17 March 2001	Loulé, Portugal	Denmark	2–0	3–0	2001 Algarve Cup	
24.	10 June 2001	Linköping, Sweden	Canada	4–2	5–2	Friendly	
25.	10 June 2001	Linköping, Sweden	Canada	5–2	5–2	Friendly	
26.	23 June 2001	Erfurt, Germany	Germany	1–0	1–3	UEFA Women's Euro 2001	
27.	27 June 2001	Jena, Germany	England	3–0	4–0	UEFA Women's Euro 2001	
28.	9 September 2001	Umeå, Sweden	Finland	4–1	8–1	2003 FIFA Women's World Cup qualification	
29.	30 September 2001	Malmö, Sweden	Denmark	2–1	4–1	2003 FIFA Women's World Cup qualification	
30.	3 November 2001	Brugg, Switzerland	Switzerland	1–0	5–0	2003 FIFA Women's World Cup qualification	
31.	25 January 2002	La Manga, Spain	England	3–0	5–0	Friendly	
32.	3 March 2002	Ferreiras, Portugal	Norway	3–2	3–3	2002 Algarve Cup	
33.	5 March 2002	Lagos, Portugal	England	4–2	6–3	2002 Algarve Cup	
34.	7 March 2002	Faro, Portugal	Germany	1–0	2–1	2002 Algarve Cup	
35.	4 May 2002	Gothenburg, Sweden	Iceland	1–0	6–0	Friendly	
36.	8 May 2002	Solna, Sweden	Switzerland	2–0	4–0	2003 FIFA Women's World Cup qualification	
37.	8 May 2002	Solna, Sweden	Switzerland	4–0	4–0	2003 FIFA Women's World Cup qualification	
38.	26 June 2002	Jakobstad, Finland	Finland	3–0	5–0	2003 FIFA Women's World Cup qualification	
39.	18 August 2002	Östersund, Sweden	North Korea	1–0	1–0	Friendly	
40.	29 January 2003	Canberra, Australia	South Korea	1–0	8–0	2003 Australia Cup	
41.	29 January 2003	Canberra, Australia	South Korea	5–0	8–0	2003 Australia Cup	
42.	14 March 2003	Olhão, Portugal	Norway	1–1	1–1	2003 Algarve Cup	
43.	16 March 2003	Ferreiras, Portugal	Canada	1–1	1–1	2003 Algarve Cup	
44.	18 March 2003	Vila Real de Santo António, Portugal	United States	1–1	1–1	2003 Algarve Cup	
45.	20 March 2003	Olhão, Portugal	Finland	5–0	5–0	2003 Algarve Cup	
46.	18 April 2003	Kalmar, Sweden	Switzerland	4–0	6–0	UEFA Women's Euro 2005 qualifying	
47.	17 May 2003	Solna, Sweden	Italy	2–0	5–0	UEFA Women's Euro 2005 qualifying	
(Note: While UEFA lists Ljungberg as the scorer of the 4–0 goal in this game, the Swedish Football Association instead recognizes it as an Italian own goal. It is thus not included in Ljungberg's official total of 72 goals.)	17 May 2003	Solna, Sweden	Italy	4–0	5–0	UEFA Women's Euro 2005 qualifying	
48.	17 May 2003	Solna, Sweden	Italy	5–0	5–0	UEFA Women's Euro 2005 qualifying	
49.	9 August 2003	Eskilstuna, Sweden	Finland	2–1	2–1	UEFA Women's Euro 2005 qualifying	
50.	15 September 2003	Washington, D.C., United States	China	1–0	2–2	Friendly	
51.	28 September 2003	Columbus, United States	Nigeria	1–0	3–0	2003 FIFA Women's World Cup	
52.	28 September 2003	Columbus, United States	Nigeria	2–0	3–0	2003 FIFA Women's World Cup	
53.	12 October 2003	Carson, United States	Germany	1–0	1–2 (a.e.t.)	2003 FIFA Women's World Cup	
54.	15 November 2003	Belgrade, Serbia and Montenegro	Serbia and Montenegro	2–0	4–0	UEFA Women's Euro 2005 qualifying	
55.	20 August 2004	Volos, Greece	Australia	1–0	2–1	2004 Summer Olympics	
56.	28 May 2005	Solna, Sweden	Canada	1–0	3–1	Friendly	
57.	5 June 2005	Blackpool, England	Denmark	1–0	1–1	UEFA Women's Euro 2005	
58.	16 June 2005	Warrington, England	Norway	1–1	2–3 (a.e.t.)	UEFA Women's Euro 2005	
59.	16 June 2005	Warrington, England	Norway	2–2	2–3 (a.e.t.)	UEFA Women's Euro 2005	
60.	28 August 2005	Karlskoga, Sweden	Iceland	1–0	2–2	2007 FIFA Women's World Cup qualification	
61.	24 September 2005	Skellefteå, Sweden	Belarus	1–0	6–0	2007 FIFA Women's World Cup qualification	
62.	24 September 2005	Skellefteå, Sweden	Belarus	2–0	6–0	2007 FIFA Women's World Cup qualification	
63.	24 September 2005	Skellefteå, Sweden	Belarus	5–0	6–0	2007 FIFA Women's World Cup qualification	
64.	24 September 2005	Skellefteå, Sweden	Belarus	6–0	6–0	2007 FIFA Women's World Cup qualification	
65.	1 November 2005	Setúbal, Portugal	Portugal	1–0	4–1	2007 FIFA Women's World Cup qualification	
66.	1 November 2005	Setúbal, Portugal	Portugal	3–0	4–1	2007 FIFA Women's World Cup qualification	
67.	26 August 2006	Reykjavík, Iceland	Iceland	4–0	4–0	2007 FIFA Women's World Cup qualification	
68.	24 September 2006	Växjö, Sweden	Czech Republic	1–0	2–0	2007 FIFA Women's World Cup qualification	
69.	24 September 2006	Växjö, Sweden	Czech Republic	2–0	2–0	2007 FIFA Women's World Cup qualification	
70.	30 August 2007	Farum, Denmark	Denmark	1–0	2–1	Friendly	
71.	30 August 2007	Farum, Denmark	Denmark	2–1	2–1	Friendly	
72.	5 March 2008	Lagos, Portugal	Finland	1–0	3–1	2008 Algarve Cup	

== Honours ==
=== Club ===
Umeå

- Damallsvenskan:

Champion (7): 2000, 2001, 2002, 2005, 2006, 2007, 2008

- Svenska Cupen Damer:

Champion (4): 2001, 2002, 2003, 2007
Runner-up (2): 2005, 2006

- Supercupen:

Champion (2): 2007, 2008
Runner-up (1): 2009

- UEFA Women's Cup:

Champion (2): 2002–03, 2003–04
Runner-up (3): 2001–02, 2006–07, 2007–08

=== International ===
Sweden

- FIFA Women's World Cup:

Runner-up (1): 2003

- Algarve Cup:

Champion (1): 2001

=== Individual ===
- Diamond Ball (1):

2001–02

- Sweden: Female Forward of the Year (1):

2004–05

- Damallsvenskan Top Goalscorer (1):

2001–02 (39 goals)

- FIFA World Player of the Year:

Third place: 2002–03
