= Angélique Roujas =

French footballer (born 1974)

Personal information
- Date of birth: 15 September 1974 (age 52)
- Place of birth: Château-du-Loir, France
- Position: Forward

Senior career*
| Years | Team | Apps | (Gls) |
| 1989–1996 | Le Mans FC | | |
| 1996–2001 | La Roche ESOF | | |

International career
| 1995–2001 | France | 51 | (14) |
- * Club domestic league appearances and goals

Angélique Roujas (born 15 September 1974) is a French former women's international footballer who played as a forward. She was a member of the France women's national football team. She was the general manager of FC Metz from 2014 to 2019.

== Personal life ==
Roujas is from Château-du-Loir (now part of Montval-sur-Loir). She was worked as a physical education teacher (EPS in French).

== Career ==
Roujas started playing regional football. After playing for a few months, she was signed by Le Mans FC in 1993. In 1996, she signed for La Roche ESOF, who had just been promoted to Division 1 Féminine.

Roujas made 51 appearances for France between 1995 and 2001, and competed at UEFA Women's Euro 1997 and UEFA Women's Euro 2001. In a Euro 1997 match against Russia, Roujas scored a hat-trick as France won 3–0. She also scored in a 1–1 draw against Spain. Roujas was joint top scorer at the tournament, alongside Italy's Carolina Morace and Norway's Marianne Pettersen. (Note: UEFA have misspelt Roujas' surname as Rouhas in the source.) She retired after Euro 2001 for personal reasons.

From 2004 to 2014, Roujas was head of the CNFE Clairefontaine, the French women's football national training centre. From 2014 to 2019, Roujas was the general manager of FC Metz. Whilst general manager, she helped set up a regional training network, to encourage local footballers to join the FC Metz first team. She particularly focused on getting girls between the ages of 6 and 13 into football.
