= UEFA Women's Euro 1997 =

Europamesterskapet i fotball for kvinner 1997 Europamästerskapet i fotboll för damer 1997
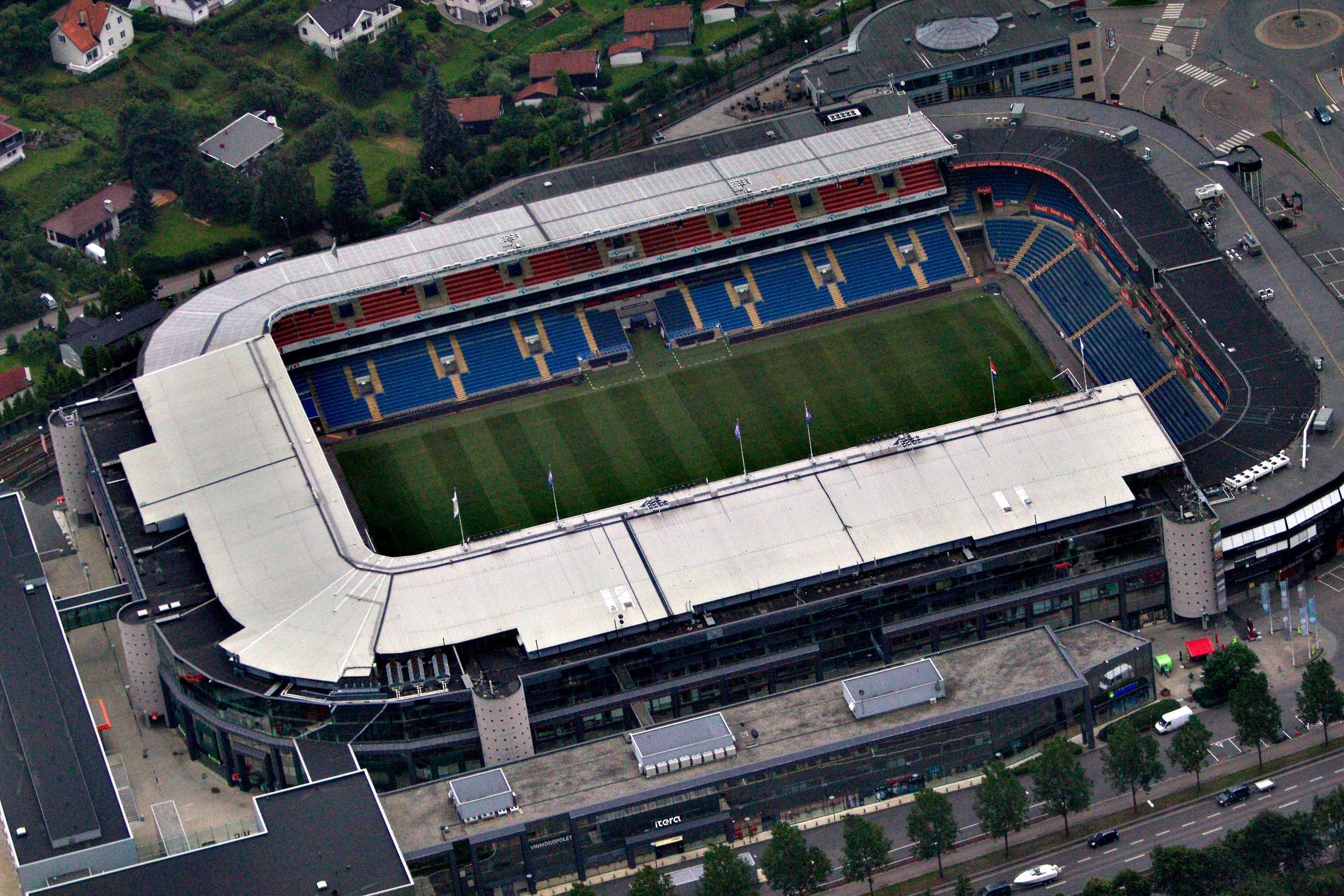
- Ullevaal Stadion in Oslo, Norway, the venue for the final

Tournament details
- Host countries: Norway; Sweden
- Dates: 29 June – 12 July
- Teams: 8
- Venue: 5 (in 5 host cities)

Final positions
- Champions: Germany (4th title)
- Runners-up: Italy

Tournament statistics
- Matches played: 15
- Goals scored: 35 (2.33 per match)
- Attendance: 35,727 (2,382 per match)
- Top scorer(s): (Italy) Carolina Morace (Norway) Marianne Pettersen (France) Angélique Roujas (4 goals each)
- Best player: (Italy) Carolina Morace

The 1997 UEFA Women's Championship, commonly referred to as the 1997 Women's Euros or just the 1997 Euros, was a football tournament held in 1997 in Norway and Sweden. The UEFA Women's Championship is a regular tournament involving European national teams from countries affiliated to UEFA, the European governing body, who have qualified for the competition. The competition aims to determine which national women's team is the best in Europe.

Germany won the competition for the second time in a row and 4th overall (counting with West Germany's victory in the former European Competition for Representative Women's Teams).

France, Spain and Russia made their debuts for the first time.

== Format ==
1997 saw a change in the tournament format as an eight-team final stage was introduced. Eight teams participated, qualifying from a total of 33 entrants. Those eight teams were divided in two groups of four. The winner and 2nd placed of the group would advance to the semi-finals and the winners would play the final.

=== Group A ===
- Sweden
- Russia
- France
- Spain

=== Group B ===
- Norway
- Denmark
- Germany
- Italy

== Squads ==
For a list of all squads that played in the final tournament, see UEFA Women's Euro 1997 squads

== Group stage ==
=== Group A ===
Team	Pld	W	D	L	GF	GA	GD	Pts
Sweden	3	3	0	0	6	1	+5	9
Spain	3	1	1	1	2	2	0	4
France	3	1	1	1	4	5	−1	4
Russia	3	0	0	3	2	6	−4	0

29 June 1997
14:00

France	1–1	Spain
Roujas 50'	Report (in French); Report	I. Parejo 14'

Nobelstadion, Karlskoga
Attendance: 920
Referee: Gitte Lyngo Nielsen (Denmark)
29 June 1997
19:00

Sweden	2–1	Russia
Ljungberg 10'; Pohjanen 82'	SvFF Report (in Swedish); RFS Report (in Russian); Report	Savina 80'

Tingvalla IP, Karlstad
Attendance: 3,829
Referee: Christine Frai (Germany)
2 July 1997
19:00

Spain	0–1	Sweden
	SvFF Report (in Swedish); Report	Svensson 7' (Note: SVFF credits this goal to Svensson, while other sources mark it an own goal.)

Nobelstadion, Karlskoga
Attendance: 3,403
Referee: Vibeke Karlsen-Gabrielsen (Norway)
2 July 1997
19:00

Russia	1–3	France
Grigorieva 52'	Report (in French); RFS Report (in Russian); Report	Roujas 27', 56', 74'

Tingvalla IP, Karlstad
Attendance: 626
Referee: Cristina Gozzi (Italy)
5 July 1997
16:00

Sweden	3–0	France
M. Andersson 18' (pen.); Locatelli 22' (o.g.); Jonsson 45'	Report (in French); SvFF Report (in Swedish); Report

Tingvalla IP, Karlstad
Attendance: 2,757
Referee: Vibeke Karlsen-Gabrielsen (Norway)
5 July 1997
16:00

Russia	0–1	Spain
	RFS Report (in Russian); Report	Á. Parejo 67'

Nobelstadion, Karlskoga
Referee: Regina Belksma-Konink (Netherlands)

=== Group B ===
Team	Pld	W	D	L	GF	GA	GD	Pts
Italy	3	1	2	0	5	3	+2	5
Germany	3	1	2	0	3	1	+2	5
Norway	3	1	1	1	5	2	+3	4
Denmark	3	0	1	2	2	9	−7	1

30 June 1997
14:00

Germany	1–1	Italy
Meinert 49'	DFB Report (in German); FIGC Report (in Italian); Report	Carta 71'

Melløs Stadion, Moss
Attendance: 713
Referee: Katriina Elovirta (Finland)
30 June 1997
20:00

Denmark	0–5	Norway
	DBU Report (in Danish); NFF Report (in Norwegian); Report	Pettersen 16', 18', 49', 81'; Støre 55'

Åråsen Stadion, Lillestrøm
Attendance: 4,221
Referee: Regina Belksma-Konink (Netherlands)
3 July 1997
17:30

Italy	2–2	Denmark
Morace 49'; Panico 80'	FIGC Report (in Italian); DBU Report (in Danish); Report	Terp 23'; M. Pedersen 62'

Åråsen Stadion, Lillestrøm
Attendance: 538
Referee: Eva Ödlund (Sweden)
3 July 1997
20:00

Norway	0–0	Germany
	NFF Report (in Norwegian); DFB Report (in German); Report

Melløs Stadion, Moss
Attendance: 7,666
Referee: Nicole Mouidi-Petignat (Switzerland)
6 July 1997
14:00

Denmark	0–2	Germany
	DBU Report (in Danish); DFB Report (in German); Report	Meyer 82'; Prinz 90'

Melløs Stadion, Moss
Attendance: 520
Referee: Katriina Elovirta (Finland)
6 July 1997
14:00

Norway	0–2	Italy
	NFF Report (in Norwegian); FIGC Report (in Italian); Report	Morace 4', 90+2'

Åråsen Stadion, Lillestrøm
Attendance: 4,067
Referee: Eva Ödlund (Sweden)

== Knockout stage ==
Semi-finals
9 July – Lillestrøm
Italy	2
Spain	1
9 July – Karlstad
Sweden	0
Germany	1

Final
12 July – Oslo
Italy	0
Germany	2

=== Semifinals ===
9 July 1997
17:30

Sweden	0–1	Germany
	DFB Report (in German); SvFF Report (in Swedish); Report	Wiegmann 84'

Tingvalla IP, Karlstad
Attendance: 4,246
Referee: Nicole Petignat (Switzerland)
9 July 1997
20:30

Italy	2–1	Spain
Fiorini 11'; Morace 29'	FIGC Report (in Italian); Report	Á. Parejo 89'

Åråsen Stadion, Lillestrøm
Attendance: 7,200
Referee: Christine Frai (Germany)

=== Final ===
12 July 1997
20:30

Italy	0–2	Germany
	DFB Report (in German); FIGC Report (in Italian); Report	Minnert 23'; Prinz 50'

Ullevaal Stadion, Oslo
Attendance: 2,221
Referee: Gitte Lyngo-Nielsen (Denmark)

== Goalscorers ==
4 goals

- (Italy) Carolina Morace
- (Norway) Marianne Pettersen
- (France) Angélique Roujas

3 goals

- (Spain) Ángeles Parejo

2 goals

- (Germany) Birgit Prinz

1 goal

- (Denmark) Lene Terp
- (Denmark) Merete Pedersen
- (Spain) Isabel Parejo
- (Germany) Maren Meinert
- (Germany) Monika Meyer
- (Germany) Sandra Minnert
- (Germany) Bettina Wiegmann
- (Italy) Antonella Carta
- (Italy) Silvia Fiorini
- (Italy) Patrizia Panico
- (Norway) Heidi Støre
- (Sweden) Malin Andersson
- (Sweden) Kristin Jonsson
- (Sweden) Hanna Ljungberg
- (Sweden) Anna Pohjanen
- (Sweden) Victoria Sandell Svensson
- (Russia) Irina Grigorieva
- (Russia) Larisa Savina

Own goal

- (France) Cécile Locatelli (playing against Sweden)

== See also ==
- UEFA Women's Championship
- UEFA
- Women's association football
