= Nobelstadion =

Stadium in Karlskoga, Sweden

Coordinates: 59°18′N 14°30′E

Nobelstadion is a stadium in Karlskoga, Sweden and is the home ground of the football team KB Karlskoga FF. It has a capacity of 5,619, including 1619 seats.

It has also been used for women's national team matches, including the UEFA Women's Euro 1997.
