= Larisa Savina =

Russian footballer (born 1970)

Personal information
- Full name: Larisa Anatolyevna Savina
- Date of birth: 25 November 1970 (age 55)
- Place of birth: Dzhezkazgan, Kazakh SSR, Soviet Union
- Position: Forward

Senior career*
Years	Team	Apps	(Gls)
1989–2000	CSK VVS Samara	170	(110)
2001	FC Energy Voronezh	10	(1)
2002–2003	Energetik Kislovodsk	15	(15)
2004–2006	Lada Togliatti	12	(13)
2007	SKA Rostov	4	(1)

International career
1992–2004	Russia	55	(19)
- * Club domestic league appearances and goals

Larisa Savina is a Russian former footballer who played mainly for CSK VVS Samara and Lada Togliatti in the Russian Championship, also playing the European Cup with Lada. She was a member of the Russian national team through the 1990s, taking part in the 1997 European Championship and the 1999 World Cup. She scored one goal in each tournament.

== Honours ==
=== Titles ===
- 4 Russian Leagues (1993, 1994, 1996, 2004)
- 3 Russian Cup (1994, 2001, 2004)
- 1 Italy Women's Cup (2005)
