= Cécile Locatelli =

French footballer (born 1970)

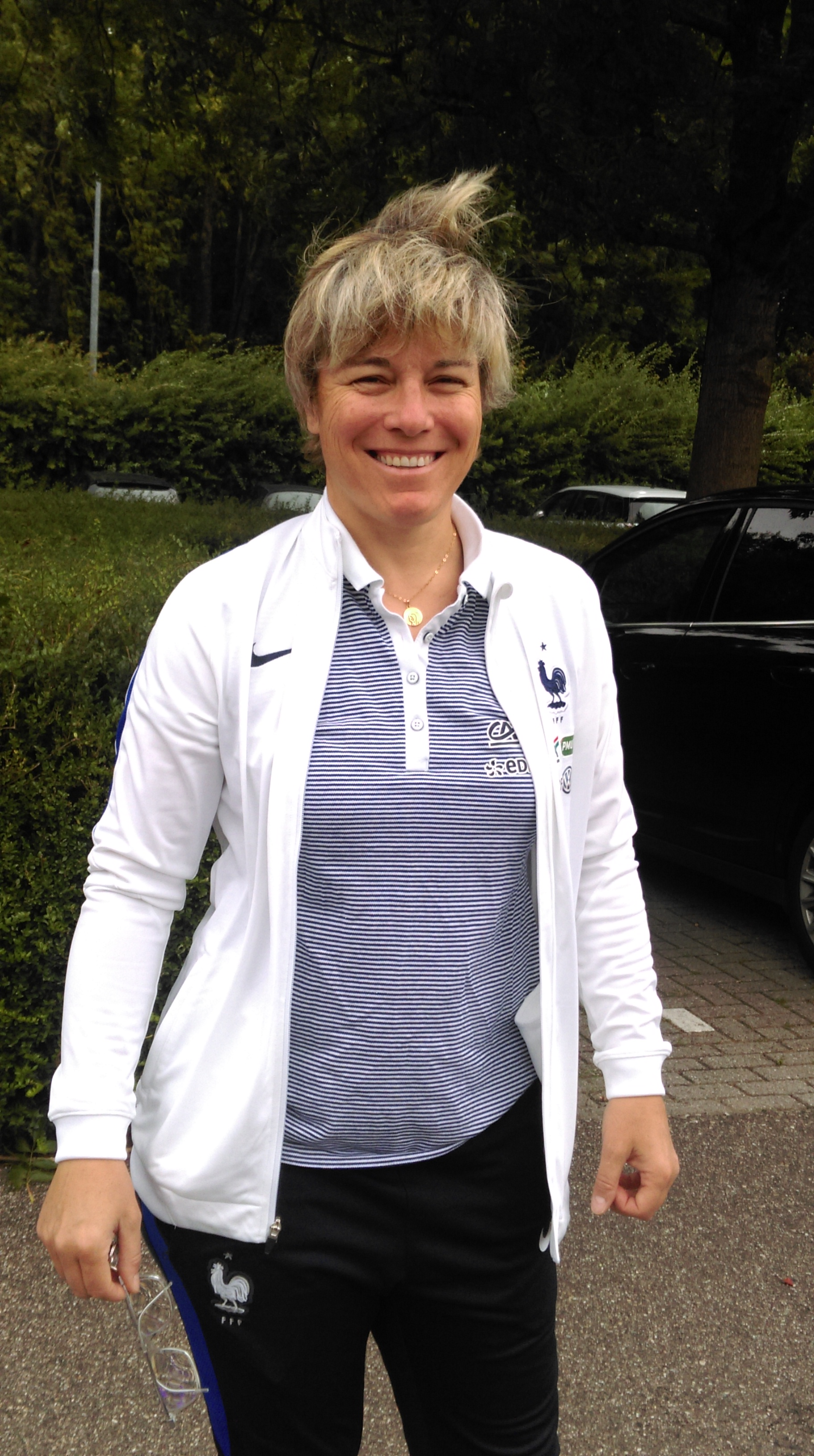
- Locatelli in 2017.

Personal information
- Full name: Cécile Sandrine Locatelli
- Date of birth: 12 November 1970 (age 55)
- Place of birth: Grenoble, France
- Height: 1.66 m (5 ft 5 in)
- Position: Defender

Senior career*
| Years | Team | Apps | (Gls) |
| 1989–1992 | FC Grenoble | | |
| 1992–2004 | FC Lyon | | |
| 2004–2006 | Lyon | 27 | (2) |

International career
| 1992–1998 | France | 46 | (2) |

Managerial career
- 2015–2019: France (women U-16)
- 2019–: France (women U-17)
- * Club domestic league appearances and goals

Cécile Locatelli (born 12 November 1970) is a French former footballer who played as a defender for Lyon of the Division 1 Féminine.

== International career ==
Cécile Locatelli represented France 46 times. She was also part of the French team at the 1997 European Championships.

== Coaching career ==
Since retiring from professional football Locatelli has become the coach of the France women's national under-17 football team.

== Honours ==
FC Lyon

- Division 1 Féminine (Champions of France) (level 1)

Winners (3): 1992–93, 1994–95, 1997–98
