= Kristin Jonsson =

Swedish international footballer

Personal information
- Date of birth: 15 March 1974 (age 52)
- Position: Forward

International career
Years	Team	Apps	(Gls)
1996−1997	Sweden	12	(2)

Kristin Jonsson (March 15, 1974) is a former Swedish footballer. Jonsson was a member of the Swedish national team that reached the semi-finals of UEFA Women's Euro 1997.

Jonsson played club football for Sunnanå SK of Damallsvenskan. She retired in 1997, at the age of 23. Since retiring from professional football, Jonsson became a nurse.
