= Carolina Morace =

Italian footballer and manager (born 1964)

Carolina Morace MEP
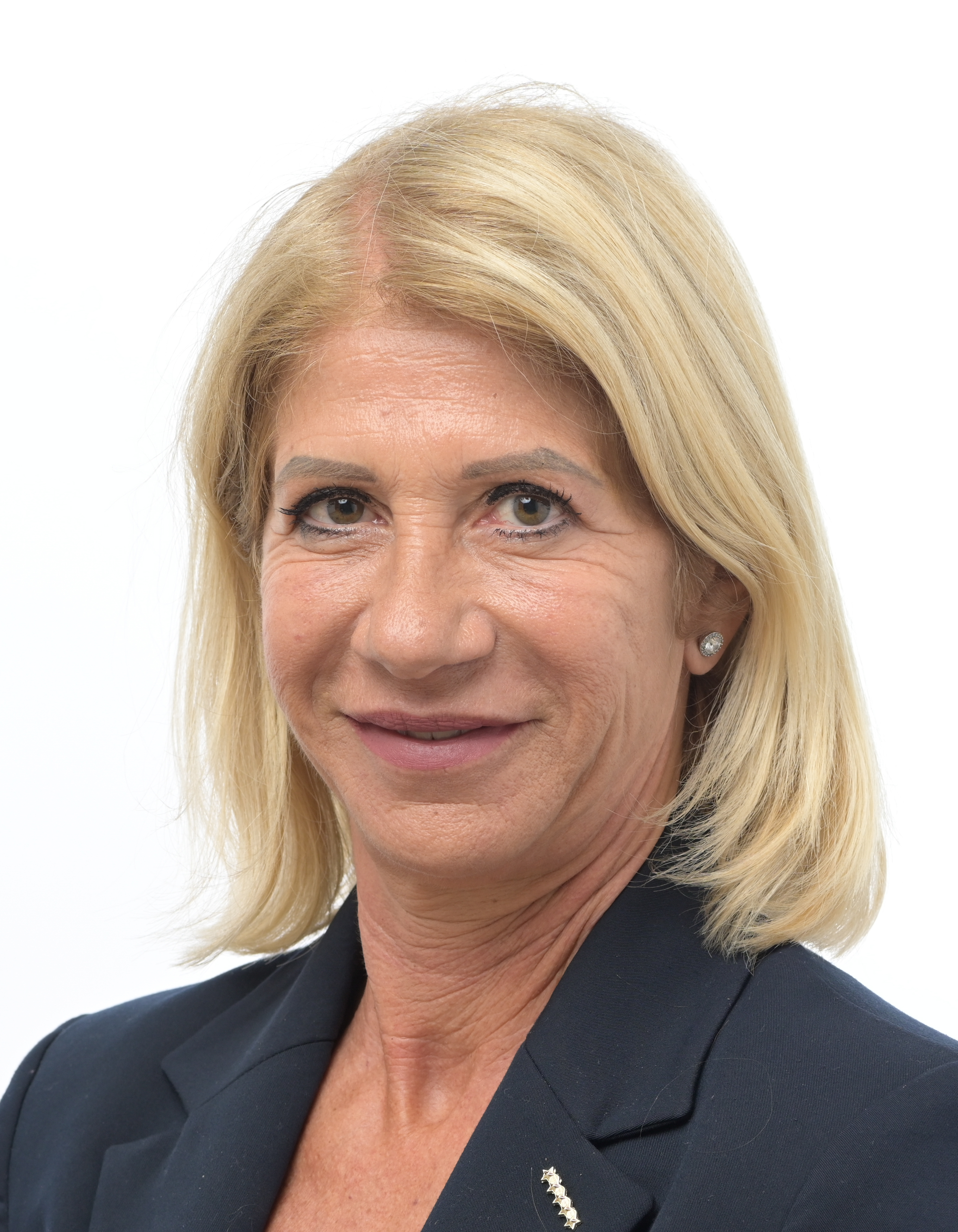
- Official portrait, 2024

Member of the European Parliament for Central Italy
- Incumbent
- Assumed office 15 July 2024

Personal details
- Born: 5 February 1964 (age 62) Venice, Italy
- Party: Five Star Movement
Association football career
- Position: Striker
Senior career*
Years	Team	Apps	(Gls)
1978–1979	Belluno		
1979–1982	Bardolino		
1982–1984	Lazio		(27)
1985–1987	Trani		
1987–1989	Lazio		(66)
1989–1991	Reggiana	52	(67)
1991–1993	Milan Salvarani	55	(64)
1993–1994	Torres	30	(33)
1994–1995	Agliana	24	(31)
1995–1996	Verona	20	(39)
1996–1998	Modena	54	(88)
Total		315	(415)
International career
1978–1997	Italy	153	(105)
Managerial career
- 1998–1999: Lazio Women
- 1999: Viterbese
- 2000–2005: Italy Women
- 2009–2011: Canada Women
- 2016–2017: Trinidad and Tobago Women
- 2018–2019: Milan Women
- 2021: Lazio Women
- 2023–2024: London City Lionesses
- * Club domestic league appearances and goals

Carolina Morace (Italian pronunciation: [karoˈliːna moˈraːtʃe]; born 5 February 1964) is an Italian politician and former football coach and player, who played as a striker. She played for the Italian national team and for various clubs in women's Serie A. She was the top scorer in Serie A in the 1984–85 season, and for 11 consecutive years from 1987–88 to 1997–98, and she holds the distinction of scoring the first hat-trick in a FIFA Women's World Cup.

After retiring as a player, she began a managing career with Lazio. She then managed the Italian national team from 2000 to 2005, and the Canadian national women's team from 2009 to 2011. In 2014, she was the first woman to be inducted into the Italian Football Hall of Fame. Morace was elected to the European Parliament in 2024. In 2019, she was named one of the Golden Foot Football Legends.

== Playing career ==
=== International ===
Born in Venice, Morace debuted for the Italian women's national team in 1978, against Yugoslavia, at the age of 14. During her career, she made 153 appearances for Italy, scoring 105 goals. While playing in the Italian national women's league, she scored more than 550 goals. She took part in six European Championships as well as the inaugural FIFA Women's World Cup China 1991, where she scored four goals, including recording the first ever hat-trick to be scored at a World Cup in their 5–0 win against Chinese Taipei.

As a curtain-raiser to the 1990 FA Charity Shield, Italy played the England women's national football team at Wembley Stadium. Morace scored all four goals in England's 4–1 defeat and was featured on the front page of the following day's La Gazzetta dello Sport, a record that has never been beaten by a male or female player since.

== Coaching career ==
Morace holds a UEFA PRO License and is probably best known for having been the first woman to coach a professional men's football team, Viterbese of Italian Serie C1, a post she took in June 1999. She eventually resigned from her position after only two matches as the President interfered with management of the technical staff.

For 5 years from 2000 to 2005, she was head coach for Italian women's national team, qualifying twice for the European Championships. In 2008–2009 Morace accepted a role as the head coach of a Men's Parliamentary Team preparing them for competition.

In February 2009, she was announced as the new head coach of the Canadian national women's team. Under her guidance, Canada won the 2010 CONCACAF, 2010 and 2011 Cyprus Cups and 2010 Four Nations Tournament. At the 2011 FIFA Women's World Cup the team's top goal scorer Christine Sinclair broke her nose in the opening match and subsequently the team did not progress to the next round as expected. In the first ever FIFA Physical Analysis at a Women's World Cup, Canada excelled in the distances covered at high speed in comparison to other teams reflecting in their quick tempo, short passing and high pressing game. Unexpectedly, she formally announced her resignation as the coach of the Canadian national women's team on Friday 22 July 2011 due to future budget disputes. Over her 2.5 years in charge Morace improved Canada's FIFA ranking from 11th to 6th position in the World.

From 2011, Carolina Morace has been leading and conducting FIFA Coaching Courses around the world as a FIFA Ambassador and Instructor. Her experience as the CEO of Juventus Academy Roma prompted her to begin her own Football Academy, Pro Soccer Coaching.

On 17 September 2015, it was announced that Morace had been appointed technical director of a Men's National Premier League Club Floreat Athena FC in Western Australia.

In December 2016, she was appointed Head Coach of her third National Team Trinidad and Tobago Women's National Team. In 2017 she and her team terminated the contract because of payment issues and later won their case with Court of Arbitration for Sport and FIFA.

In 2018, Morace returned to Italy as she became the first coach of AC Milan Women in Serie A finishing third in their inaugural season and the only team to defeat Juventus 3–0.

In February 2021, Morace returned to her former side Lazio. On 9 May 2021, Lazio earned promotion back to Serie A for the 2021–22 season. In October 2021, she was sacked by the club, along with assistant coach Nicola Williams after five consecutive losses.

In July 2023, Morace was appointed head coach of the Women's Championship (England) side London City Lionesses on a two-year deal starting from the 2023–24 Women's Championship season Morace was sacked by the Lionesses on 7 February 2024, with the club 10th in the Championship and in relegation trouble.

== Political career ==
In April 2024, former prime minister Giuseppe Conte, president of the Five Star Movement, announced Morace's candidacy at the top of the list in the Central Italy constituency for the European Parliament election in June, and she was subsequently elected member of the European Parliament (MEP).

== Personal life ==
She was born in Venice.

Morace gained a law degree in 1996 and practises at a legal studio in Rome.

After featuring for 13 years on Italian television, Morace became a celebrity in Italy. Her role as a football commentator and analyst for the Men's Serie A Professional League saw her work across channels La7, Telemontecarlo, Rai 1 and Rai International and write weekly articles for La Gazzetta Dello Sport.

In 2015, Morace featured in a comic book as a coach for a Professional Primavera football squad called "Elfio e i Satanelli!".

On 11 October 2020, Morace came out as lesbian, recounting her life in her book Fuori dagli schemi. She married the former Australian footballer Nicola Williams, with whom she celebrated the wedding twice—first in Bristol, on the SS Great Britain, and the second in Australia.

== See also ==
- List of association women football players with 100 or more international goals
- List of women footballers with 300 or more goals
- List of UEFA Women's Championship goalscorers
- List of UEFA Women's Championship records
- List of LGBT sportspeople
