= Susan Mackensie =

Danish footballer

Personal information
- Full name: Susan Jepsen Mackensie
- Date of birth: 24 December 1962 (age 63)
- Position: Defender

Senior career*
Years	Team	Apps	(Gls)
- HEI

International career
1983–1993	Denmark	27	(6)
- * Club domestic league appearances and goals

Susan Jepsen Mackensie (born 24 December 1962) is a Danish former football defender, who played for the senior Danish national team for 10 years from 1983 to 1993.

== International career ==
Mackensie made her senior international debut for Denmark in August 1983, playing in a 2–1 friendly defeat by Sweden in Mellerud.

At the 1991 FIFA Women's World Cup in China, Mackensie played the full 80 minutes in all three group games as Denmark qualified for the quarter final, scoring in the 3–0 win over New Zealand. In the quarter final against Germany, Mackensie scored a penalty kick to equalise Bettina Wiegmann's opening goal and force extra time. Heidi Mohr scored the winning goal for Germany with two minutes left in extra time.

Mackensie inherited the national team captaincy after the World Cup. She scored twice in her final match for Denmark, a 3–1 win over Germany in the third place play–off at UEFA Women's Euro 1993.

== Personal life ==
Mackensie is married to Poul Højmose, a former footballer who was her coach at Hjortshøj-Egå. Højmose later trained the Danish women's national team from 1999 to 2004. In 2004 the couple were living in Højbjerg with their two daughters.
