= Claudia Müller (footballer) =

German footballer

Personal information
- Date of birth: 21 May 1974 (age 52)
- Place of birth: Bremen, West Germany

Senior career*
Years	Team	Apps	(Gls)
1999–2005	VfL Wolfsburg		

International career
1996–2001	Germany	46	(23)
Medal record
Women's football
Representing Germany
Olympic Games
Bronze medal – third place	2000 Sydney	Team competition
UEFA Women's Euro
Bronze medal – third place	2001	Team competition
- * Club domestic league appearances and goals

Claudia Müller (born 21 May 1974 in Bremen) is a German footballer who played as a striker. She scored 23 goals in 46 caps for the Germany national team between 1996 and 2001.

Müller played for Germany at the 1999 FIFA Women's World Cup finals and the 2000 Summer Olympics. In 2001, she was the leading goal-scorer at the UEFA Women's Euro 2001 securing Germany's third consecutive championship (and the fifth all-time).

== International goals ==
No.	Date	Venue	Opponent	Score	Result	Competition
1.	14 October 1999	Marschweg-Stadion, Oldenburg, Germany	Iceland	6–0	6–0	UEFA Women's Euro 2001 qualifying
2.	23 June 2001	Steigerwaldstadion, Erfurt, Germany	Sweden	1–1	3–1	UEFA Women's Euro 2001
3.	23 June 2001	Steigerwaldstadion, Erfurt, Germany	Sweden	2–1	3–1	UEFA Women's Euro 2001
4.	7 July 2001	Donaustadion, Ulm, Germany	Sweden	1–0	1–0 (a.e.t.)	UEFA Women's Euro 2001
