= Karolina (given name) =

Karolina, Karolína or Karolīna is a feminine given name. Karolina is a Croatian, Danish, Faroese, Finnish, German, Hungarian, Indonesian, Lithuanian, Macedonian, Norwegian, Polish, Russian, Slovene, and Swedish name. Karolína is a Czech, Icelandic and Slovak name that is a form of Karolina and Carolina and a diminutive form of Karola and Carola. Karolīna is a Latvian name. Notable people with the name include the following:

== Given name ==
=== Arts, Music & Literature ===
- Karolina (singer), professional name of Keren Karolina Avratz, Israeli singer
- Karolina Bock (1792 – 1872), Swedish dancer, actress and singer
- Karolina Borchardt (1905–1995), Polish artist and aviator.
- Karólína Eiríksdóttir (born 1951), Icelandic composer
- Karolina Gočeva (born 1980), Macedonian singer
- Karolina Gorczyca (born 1985), Polish actress
- Karolina Gruszka (born 1980), Polish actress
- Karolina Halatek (born 1985), Polish artist
- Karolina Kuiek, known as Ani Lorak (born 1978), Ukrainian singer, songwriter, actress, entrepreneur
- Karolína Kurková (born 1984), Czech model
- Karolina Laskowska, British fashion designer
- Karolina Lewicka Polish director, writer and producer
- Karolina Lubienska (1905–1991), Polish actress
- Karolína Mališová (born 1996), Czech model and beauty pageant titleholder
- Karolina Nowakowska (born 1982), Polish actress, dancer and vocalist
- Karolina Pavlova (1807 – 1893), Russian poet and novelist
- Karolina Proniewska (1828–1859), Lithuanian poet and translator
- Karolina Protsenko (born 2008), Ukrainian-American violinist
- Karolina Slunéčková, (1934 – 1983), Czech actress
- Karolína Světlá (1830 – 1899), Czech author
- Karolina Wydra (born 1981), Polish model and actress
- Karolina Zakrzewska, Polish beauty pageant contestant

=== Economics ===
- Karolina Ekholm (born 1964), Swedish economist

=== Medical ===
- Karolina Widerström, (1856 – 1949), Swedish doctor and gynecologist
- Karolina Jus (1914 – 2002), Polish-Canadian neurologist

=== Historical figures ===
- Karolina Lanckorońska (1898 — 2002), Polish noble, resistance fighter, and historian
- Karolina of Legnica-Brieg (1652 – 24 December 1707 in Wrocław), Silesian noble
- Karolina Sobańska (1795 – 1885), Polish spy and noblewoman

=== Politics ===
- Karolina Gajewska (born 1972), Polish politician
- Karolina Kaczorowska (1930–2021), Polish First Lady
- Karolina Pawliczak (born 1976), Polish lawyer and politician
- Karolína Peake (born 1975), Czech politician
- Karolina Skog (born 1976), Swedish politician
- Karolina Stallwood, British executive
- Karolina Widerberg (born 1984), Swedish politician

=== Religion ===
- Karolina Gerhardinger,(1797 – 1879), German Roman Catholic sister
- Karolina Kózka (1898 – 1914), Polish Roman Catholic

=== Sports ===
- Karolina Arewång-Höjsgaard (born 1971), Swedish orienteering competitor
- Karolína Bednárová (born 1986), Czech volleyball player
- Karolina Bochra (born 1988), Polish footballer
- Karolina Bosiek (born 2000), Polish speed skater
- Karolina Chrapek (born 1990), German alpine skier
- Karolina Chlewińska (born 1983), Polish fencer
- Karolína Elhotová (born 1992), Czech basketball player
- Karolína Erbanová (born 1992), Czech speed skater
- Karolina Ericsson (born 1973), Swedish badminton player
- Karolina Fotiadou (born 1970), Cypriot alpine skier
- Karolina Goliat (born 1996), Belgian volleyball player
- Karolína Grohová (born 1990), Czech cross-country skier
- Karolina Hájková (born 1997), Slovak swimmer
- Karolina Jagieniak (born 1979), Polish tennis player
- Karolina Jarzyńska (born 1981), Polish long-distance athlete
- Karolina Jovanović (born 1988), Serbian tennis player
- Karolina Karasiewicz (born 1992), Polish cyclist
- Karolina Karlsson (born 1966), Swedish tennis player
- Karolina Kedzierska (born 1987), Swedish Taekwondoist
- Karolina Kochaniak (born 1995), Polish handball player
- Karolina Kołeczek (born 1993), Polish hurdling athlete
- Karolina Konieczna, Polish cyclist
- Karolína Kosinová (born 1998), Czech ice hockey player
- Karolina Kosińska (born 1986), Polish tennis player
- Karolina Kowalkiewicz (born 1985), Polish mixed martial artist
- Karolina Kucharczyk (born 1991), Polish Paralympic athlete
- Karolina Kudłacz-Gloc (born 1985), Polish handball player
- Karolina Michalczuk (born 1979), Polish boxer
- Karolína Muchová (born 1996), Czech tennis player
- Karolina Naja (born 1990), Polish sprint canoer
- Karolina Nowak (born 1999), Polish gymnast
- Karolina Pahlitzsch (born 1994), German athlete
- Karolina Pęk Polish para table tennis player
- Karolina Pelendritou (born 1986), Cypriot paralympic swimmer
- Karolína Pilařová, Czech curler
- Karolína Plíšková (born 1992), Czech tennis player
- Karolina Podgórska (born 1987), Polish darts player
- Karolina Riemen (born 1988), Polish freestyle skier
- Karolina Sadalska (born 1981), Polish sprint canoer
- Karolina Semeniuk-Olchawa (born 1983), Polish handball player
- Karolina Sevastyanova (born 1995), Russian gymnast
- Karolina Siódmiak (born 1981), Polish handball player
- Karolina Sklenyte (born 1996), Lithuanian gymnast
- Karolina Šprem (born 1984), Croatian tennis player
- Karolína Stuchlá (born 1994), Czech tennis player
- Karolina Styczyńska (born 1991), Polish shogi player
- Karolina Szabó (born 1961), Hungarian long-distance athlete
- Karolina Szczepaniak (born 1992), Polish swimmer
- Karolina Sztokfisz (born 1989), Polish snowboarder
- Karolina Szwed-Orneborg (born 1989), Polish handball player
- Karolina Tymińska (born 1984), Polish heptathlete
- Karolina Urban, Canadian women's ice hockey player
- Karolina Westberg (born 1978), Swedish footballer
- Karolina Wisniewska (born 1976), Polish para-alpine standing skier
- Karolina Wlodarczak (born 1987), Australian tennis player
- Karolina Zalewska (born 1984), Polish handball player

=== Others ===
- Karolina Andriette Nobel (1803 – 1889), Swedish woman and mother of Alfred Nobel
- Karolina Bielawska (born 1999), Polish model and beauty pageant titleholder who was crowned Miss World 2021
- Karolina Lassbo (born 1980), Swedish blogger
- Karolina Olsson, Swedish woman who hibernated for three decades
- Karolina Wigura (born 1980), Polish sociologist, historian and journalist

== Nickname ==
- Karolina Ramqvist, nickname of Annika Virtanen Ramqvist (born 1976), Swedish journalist and author

== Middle name ==
- Maria Josefa Karolina Brader (1860 - 1943), Swiss Roman Catholic religious sister
- Anna Karolina Orzelska (1707 – 1769), Polish noblewoman
- Ludwika Karolina Radziwiłł (1667 – 1695), Princess of the Grand Duchy of Lithuania
- Anna Karolína Schmiedlová (born 1994), Slovak tennis player
- Maria Karolina Sobieska (1697 – 1740), Polish noblewoman
- Elin Karolina Svensson (1879–??), Swedish missionary

== Fictional characters ==
- Karolina Dean, a Marvel Comics member of the Runaways
- Karolina Novotney, head of PR for Waystar/Royco on the HBO series Succession

== See also ==
- Karolina (disambiguation)
- Karolina (given name)
- Carolina (name)
- Karoliina
- Karolin (name)
- Karoline
