= UEFA Women's Euro 2009 squads =

This article lists all the confirmed national football squads for the UEFA Women's Euro 2009.

Players marked (c) were named as captain for their national squad.

== Group A ==
=== Denmark ===
Head coach: (Denmark) Kenneth Heiner-Møller

No.	Pos.	Player	Date of birth (age)	Caps	Goals	Club
1	GK	Heidi Johansen	9 June 1983 (aged 26)			(Danish Football Association) Fortuna Hjørring
2	DF	Mia Brogaard	15 October 1981 (aged 27)			(Danish Football Association) Brøndby IF
3	DF	Katrine Pedersen (c)	13 April 1977 (aged 32)			(Norwegian Football Federation) Stabæk IF
4	DF	Mette Jensen	28 May 1987 (aged 22)			(Danish Football Association) Fortuna Hjørring
5	DF	Line Røddik Hansen	31 January 1988 (aged 21)			(Danish Football Association) Brøndby IF
6	MF	Marie Bjerg	16 July 1988 (aged 21)			(Danish Football Association) IK Skovbakken
7	MF	Cathrine Paaske-Sørensen	14 June 1978 (aged 31)			(Swedish Football Association) Linköpings FC
8	MF	Julie Rydahl Bukh	9 January 1982 (aged 27)			(Swedish Football Association) Linköpings FC
9	FW	Maiken Pape	20 February 1978 (aged 31)			(Norwegian Football Federation) Stabæk IF
10	MF	Camilla Sand Andersen	14 February 1986 (aged 23)			(Danish Football Association) Fortuna Hjørring
11	FW	Nadia Nadim	2 January 1988 (aged 21)			(Danish Football Association) IK Skovbakken
12	DF	Janne Madsen	12 March 1978 (aged 31)			(Danish Football Association) Fortuna Hjørring
13	FW	Johanna Rasmussen	2 July 1983 (aged 26)			(Swedish Football Association) Umeå IK
14	FW	Lene Jensen	17 March 1976 (aged 33)			(Danish Football Association) Brøndby IF
15	MF	Sanne Troelsgaard Nielsen	15 August 1988 (aged 21)			(Danish Football Association) Brøndby IF
16	GK	Tine Cederkvist	21 March 1979 (aged 30)			(Swedish Football Association) LdB FC Malmö
17	FW	Tina Rasmussen	14 April 1980 (aged 29)			(Danish Football Association) IK Skovbakken
18	MF	Nanna Christiansen	17 June 1989 (aged 20)			(Danish Football Association) Brøndby IF
19	MF	Ditte Larsen	24 April 1983 (aged 26)			(Danish Football Association) Brøndby IF
20	MF	Katrine Veje	19 June 1991 (aged 18)			(Danish Football Association) Odense BK
21	GK	Mia-Maria Kjærsgaard-Andersen	19 January 1989 (aged 20)			(Danish Football Association) IK Skovbakken
22	DF	Marianne Pedersen	28 February 1985 (aged 24)			(Danish Football Association) IK Skovbakken

=== Finland ===
Head coach: (Finland) Michael Käld

No.	Pos.	Player	Date of birth (age)	Caps	Goals	Club
1	GK	Minna Meriluoto	4 October 1985 (aged 23)			(Swedish Football Association) Hammarby IF DFF
2	DF	Petra Vaelma	11 May 1982 (aged 27)			(Norwegian Football Federation) Klepp IL
3	MF	Jessica Julin	6 December 1978 (aged 30)			(Swedish Football Association) Stattena IF
4	DF	Sanna Valkonen (c)	12 December 1977 (aged 31)			(Swedish Football Association) KIF Örebro DFF
5	DF	Miia Niemi	9 July 1983 (aged 26)			(Norwegian Football Federation) Amazon Grimstad FK
6	DF	Tiina Salmén	3 August 1984 (aged 25)			(Norwegian Football Federation) Amazon Grimstad FK
7	MF	Anne Mäkinen	1 February 1976 (aged 33)			(Swedish Football Association) AIK Fotboll Dam
8	MF	Katri Nokso-Koivisto	22 November 1982 (aged 26)			(German Football Association) VfL Wolfsburg
9	FW	Laura Österberg Kalmari	27 May 1979 (aged 30)			(Swedish Football Association) AIK Fotboll Dam
10	MF	Anna-Kaisa Rantanen	10 February 1978 (aged 31)			(Swedish Football Association) Linköpings FC
11	MF	Susanna Lehtinen	8 May 1983 (aged 26)			(Swedish Football Association) KIF Örebro DFF
12	GK	Petra Häkkinen	31 January 1979 (aged 30)			(Football Association of Finland) HJK Helsinki
13	DF	Tuija Hyyrynen	10 March 1988 (aged 21)			(Football Association of Finland) HJK Helsinki
14	GK	Tinja-Riikka Korpela	5 May 1986 (aged 23)			(Football Association of Finland) FC Honka
15	MF	Sanna Malaska	6 April 1983 (aged 26)			(Norwegian Football Federation) Amazon Grimstad FK
16	MF	Anna Westerlund	9 April 1989 (aged 20)			(Football Association of Finland) FC Honka
17	DF	Maiju Hirvonen	25 December 1990 (aged 18)			(Football Association of Finland) NiceFutis
18	FW	Linda Sällström	13 July 1988 (aged 21)			(Swedish Football Association) Djurgårdens IF Dam
19	MF	Essi Sainio	9 September 1986 (aged 22)			(Swedish Football Association) AIK Fotboll Dam
20	FW	Annica Sjölund	31 March 1985 (aged 24)			(Swedish Football Association) Djurgårdens IF Dam
21	FW	Sanna Talonen	15 June 1984 (aged 25)			(Swedish Football Association) KIF Örebro DFF
22	DF	Maija Saari	26 March 1986 (aged 23)			(Swedish Football Association) Umeå IK

=== Netherlands ===
Head coach: (Netherlands) Vera Pauw

No.	Pos.	Player	Date of birth (age)	Caps	Goals	Club
1	GK	Loes Geurts*	12 January 1986 (aged 23)	125	0	(Royal Dutch Football Association) AZ Alkmaar
2	DF	Dyanne Bito	10 August 1981 (aged 28)	146	6	(Royal Dutch Football Association) AZ Alkmaar
3	DF	Daphne Koster (c)	13 March 1981 (aged 28)	139	7	(Royal Dutch Football Association) AZ Alkmaar
4	DF	Manoe Meulen	11 September 1978 (aged 30)	55	1	(Royal Dutch Football Association) Willem II
5	DF	Petra Hogewoning	26 March 1986 (aged 23)	100	0	(Royal Dutch Football Association) FC Utrecht
6	MF	Anouk Hoogendijk	6 May 1985 (aged 24)	103	9	(Royal Dutch Football Association) FC Utrecht
7	MF	Annemieke Kiesel-Griffioen	30 November 1979 (aged 29)	156	19	(German Football Association) FCR 2001 Duisburg
8	MF	Kirsten van de Ven	11 May 1985 (aged 24)	87	18	(Royal Dutch Football Association) Willem II
9	FW	Manon Melis	31 August 1986 (aged 22)	136	59	(Swedish Football Association) LdB FC Malmö
10	FW	Karin Stevens	11 June 1989 (aged 20)	35	16	(Royal Dutch Football Association) Willem II
11	MF	Sylvia Smit	4 July 1986 (aged 23)	106	30	(Royal Dutch Football Association) SC Heerenveen
12	DF	Marije Brummel	19 March 1985 (aged 24)	29	1	(Royal Dutch Football Association) SC Heerenveen
13	GK	Angela Christ	6 March 1989 (aged 20)	17	0	(Royal Dutch Football Association) FC Utrecht
14	DF	Marloes de Boer	30 January 1982 (aged 27)	60	4	(Royal Dutch Football Association) FC Twente
15	FW	Claudia van den Heiligenberg	25 March 1985 (aged 24)	97	8	(Royal Dutch Football Association) AZ Alkmaar
16	GK	Petra Dugardein	14 April 1977 (aged 32)	4	0	(Royal Dutch Football Association) Willem II
17	MF	Sherida Spitse*	29 May 1990 (aged 19)	181	41	(Royal Dutch Football Association) SC Heerenveen
18	MF	Lianne de Vries	28 June 1990 (aged 19)	9	1	(Royal Dutch Football Association) FC Utrecht
19	MF	Marlous Pieëte	19 July 1989 (aged 20)	51	8	(Royal Dutch Football Association) FC Twente
20	DF	Jeanine van Dalen	18 June 1986 (aged 23)	10	0	(Royal Dutch Football Association) ADO Den Haag
21	FW	Chantal de Ridder	19 January 1989 (aged 20)	46	10	(Royal Dutch Football Association) AZ Alkmaar
22	FW	Shanice van de Sanden*	2 October 1992 (aged 16)	82	18	(Royal Dutch Football Association) FC Utrecht

* goals and caps at Dec. 2020. The rest at career end.

=== Ukraine ===
Head coach: (Ukraine) Anatoliy Kutsev

No.	Pos.	Player	Date of birth (age)	Caps	Goals	Club
1	GK	Iryna Zvarych	8 May 1983 (aged 26)			(Russian Football Union) WFC Rossiyanka
2	DF	Olena Mazurenko (c)	24 October 1969 (aged 39)			(German Football Association) FC Nürnberg
3	MF	Tetyana Chorna	25 February 1981 (aged 28)			(Russian Football Union) WFC Rossiyanka
4	MF	Valentyna Kotyk	8 January 1978 (aged 31)			(Russian Football Union) ShVSM-Izmaylovo Moscow
5	FW	Oksana Yakovyshyn	20 March 1993 (aged 16)			(Ukrainian Association of Football) Lehenda Chernihiv
6	FW	Lyudmyla Pekur	6 January 1981 (aged 28)			(Russian Football Union) WFC Rossiyanka
7	DF	Olena Khodyreva	19 May 1981 (aged 28)			(Ukrainian Association of Football) Lehenda Chernihiv
8	FW	Olha Boychenko	6 January 1989 (aged 20)			(Ukrainian Association of Football) Lehenda Chernihiv
9	MF	Vira Dyatel	3 March 1984 (aged 25)			(Russian Football Union) Zvezda 2005 Perm
10	FW	Svitlana Frishko	15 March 1976 (aged 33)			(Ukrainian Association of Football) Zhytlobud-1 Kharkiv
11	FW	Natalia Zinchenko	3 October 1979 (aged 29)			(Russian Football Union) Zvezda 2005 Perm
12	GK	Nadiya Baranova	5 July 1983 (aged 26)			(Russian Football Union) Zvezda 2005 Perm
13	DF	Inessa Tytova	18 March 1976 (aged 33)			(Ukrainian Association of Football) Zhytlobud-1 Kharkiv
14	DF	Yuliya Vaschenko	31 January 1978 (aged 31)			(Ukrainian Association of Football) Zhytlobud-1 Kharkiv
15	MF	Lyudmyla Lemeshko	12 November 1979 (aged 29)			(Russian Football Union) ShVSM-Izmaylovo Moscow
16	MF	Alla Lyshafay	24 December 1983 (aged 25)			(Russian Football Union) Zvezda 2005 Perm
17	MF	Daryna Apanaschenko	16 May 1986 (aged 23)			(Russian Football Union) Zvezda 2005 Perm
18	MF	Nataliya Sukhorukova	18 October 1975 (aged 33)			(Ukrainian Association of Football) Zhytlobud-1 Kharkiv
19	DF	Maryna Masalska	17 May 1985 (aged 24)			(Ukrainian Association of Football) Zhytlobud-1 Kharkiv
20	DF	Iryna Vasylyuk	18 May 1985 (aged 24)			(Ukrainian Association of Football) Illichivka Mariupol
21	MF	Tetyana Romanenko	3 October 1990 (aged 18)			(Russian Football Union) Energiya Voronezh
22	GK	Kateryna Samson	5 July 1988 (aged 21)			(Ukrainian Association of Football) Lehenda Chernihiv

== Group B ==
=== Germany ===
Head coach: (Germany) Silvia Neid

No.	Pos.	Player	Date of birth (age)	Caps	Goals	Club
1	GK	Nadine Angerer	10 November 1978 (aged 30)			(German Football Association) 1. FFC Frankfurt
2	DF	Kerstin Stegemann	29 September 1977 (aged 31)			(German Football Association) FC Gütersloh
3	DF	Saskia Bartusiak	9 September 1982 (aged 26)			(German Football Association) 1. FFC Frankfurt
4	DF	Babett Peter	12 May 1988 (aged 21)			(German Football Association) 1. FFC Turbine Potsdam
5	DF	Annike Krahn	1 July 1985 (aged 24)			(German Football Association) FCR 2001 Duisburg
6	MF	Simone Laudehr	12 July 1986 (aged 23)			(German Football Association) FCR 2001 Duisburg
7	FW	Melanie Behringer	18 November 1985 (aged 23)			(German Football Association) FC Bayern Munich
8	FW	Inka Grings	31 October 1978 (aged 30)			(German Football Association) FCR 2001 Duisburg
9	FW	Birgit Prinz (c)	25 October 1977 (aged 31)			(German Football Association) 1. FFC Frankfurt
10	MF	Linda Bresonik	7 December 1983 (aged 25)			(German Football Association) FCR 2001 Duisburg
11	FW	Anja Mittag	16 May 1985 (aged 24)			(German Football Association) 1. FFC Turbine Potsdam
12	GK	Ursula Holl	26 June 1982 (aged 27)			(German Football Association) FCR 2001 Duisburg
13	FW	Célia Okoyino da Mbabi	27 June 1988 (aged 21)			(German Football Association) SC 07 Bad Neuenahr
14	MF	Kim Kulig	9 April 1990 (aged 19)			(German Football Association) Hamburger SV
15	DF	Sonja Fuss	5 November 1978 (aged 30)			(German Football Association) 1. FC Köln
16	FW	Martina Müller	18 April 1980 (aged 29)			(German Football Association) VfL Wolfsburg (women)
17	DF	Ariane Hingst	25 July 1979 (aged 30)			(German Football Association) 1. FFC Turbine Potsdam
18	MF	Kerstin Garefrekes	4 September 1979 (aged 29)			(German Football Association) 1. FFC Frankfurt
19	FW	Fatmire Bajramaj	1 April 1988 (aged 21)			(German Football Association) 1. FFC Turbine Potsdam
20	DF	Jennifer Zietz	14 September 1983 (aged 25)			(German Football Association) 1. FFC Turbine Potsdam
21	GK	Lisa Weiß	29 October 1987 (aged 21)			(German Football Association) SG Essen-Schönebeck
22	DF	Bianca Schmidt	23 January 1990 (aged 19)			(German Football Association) 1. FFC Turbine Potsdam

=== France ===
Head coach: (France) Bruno Bini

No.	Pos.	Player	Date of birth (age)	Caps	Goals	Club
1	GK	Céline Deville	24 January 1982 (aged 27)			(French Football Federation) Montpellier
2	DF	Laure Lepailleur	7 March 1985 (aged 24)			(French Football Federation) Paris Saint-Germain
3	DF	Ophélie Meilleroux	18 January 1984 (aged 25)			(French Football Federation) Nord Allier
4	DF	Laura Georges	20 August 1984 (aged 25)			(French Football Federation) Olympique Lyonnais
5	DF	Sabrina Viguier	4 January 1981 (aged 28)			(French Football Federation) Montpellier
6	MF	Sandrine Soubeyrand (c)	16 August 1973 (aged 36)			(French Football Federation) Juvisy
7	MF	Corine Franco	5 October 1983 (aged 25)			(French Football Federation) Olympique Lyonnais
8	DF	Sonia Bompastor	8 June 1980 (aged 29)			(United States Soccer Federation) Washington Freedom
9	FW	Candie Herbert	4 June 1977 (aged 32)			(French Football Federation) Hénin-Beaumont
10	MF	Camille Abily	5 December 1984 (aged 24)			(United States Soccer Federation) Los Angeles Sol
11	FW	Laëtitia Tonazzi	31 January 1981 (aged 28)			(French Football Federation) Juvisy
12	FW	Élodie Thomis	13 August 1986 (aged 23)			(French Football Federation) Olympique Lyonnais
13	FW	Sandrine Brétigny	2 July 1984 (aged 25)			(French Football Federation) Olympique Lyonnais
14	MF	Louisa Necib	23 January 1987 (aged 22)			(French Football Federation) Olympique Lyonnais
15	MF	Élise Bussaglia	24 September 1985 (aged 23)			(French Football Federation) Paris Saint-Germain
16	GK	Sarah Bouhaddi	17 October 1986 (aged 22)			(French Football Federation) Olympique Lyonnais
17	MF	Gaëtane Thiney	28 October 1985 (aged 23)			(French Football Federation) Juvisy
18	MF	Amandine Henry	28 September 1989 (aged 19)			(French Football Federation) Olympique Lyonnais
19	FW	Eugénie Le Sommer	18 May 1988 (aged 21)			(French Football Federation) Stade Briochin
20	DF	Delphine Blanc	7 June 1983 (aged 26)			(French Football Federation) Montpellier
21	DF	Ludivine Diguelman	15 April 1984 (aged 25)			(French Football Federation) Montpellier
22	GK	Laëtitia Stribick-Burckel	22 January 1984 (aged 25)			(French Football Federation) Soyaux

=== Iceland ===
Head coach: (Iceland) Sigurður Ragnar Eyjólfsson

No.	Pos.	Player	Date of birth (age)	Caps	Goals	Club
1	GK	Þóra Björg Helgadóttir	5 May 1981 (aged 28)			(Norwegian Football Federation) Kolbotn IL
2	DF	Guðrún Sóley Gunnarsdóttir	15 September 1981 (aged 27)			(Swedish Football Association) Djurgårdens IF Fotboll (women)
3	DF	Ólína Guðbjörg Viðarsdóttir	16 November 1982 (aged 26)			(Swedish Football Association) KIF Örebro DFF
4	MF	Edda Garðarsdóttir	15 July 1979 (aged 30)			(Swedish Football Association) KIF Örebro DFF
5	DF	Ásta Árnadóttir	9 June 1983 (aged 26)			(Swedish Football Association) Tyresö FF
6	MF	Hólmfríður Magnúsdóttir	20 September 1984 (aged 24)			(Swedish Football Association) Kristianstads DFF
7	MF	Dóra Stefánsdóttir	27 April 1985 (aged 24)			(Football Association of Iceland) Valur
8	DF	Katrín Jónsdóttir (c)	31 May 1977 (aged 32)			(Football Association of Iceland) Valur
9	FW	Margrét Lára Viðarsdóttir	25 July 1986 (aged 23)			(Swedish Football Association) Kristianstads DFF
10	FW	Dóra María Lárusdóttir	24 July 1985 (aged 24)			(Football Association of Iceland) Valur
11	MF	Sara Björk Gunnarsdóttir	29 September 1990 (aged 18)			(Football Association of Iceland) Breiðablik (sports club)
12	MF	Guðný Björk Óðinsdóttir	27 September 1988 (aged 20)			(Swedish Football Association) Kristianstads DFF
13	GK	Guðbjörg Gunnarsdóttir	18 May 1985 (aged 24)			(Swedish Football Association) Djurgårdens IF Fotboll (women)
14	FW	Erna Björk Sigurðardóttir	30 December 1982 (aged 26)			(Football Association of Iceland) Breiðablik (sports club)
15	MF	Katrín Ómarsdóttir	27 June 1987 (aged 22)			(Football Association of Iceland) KR
16	MF	Rakel Logadóttir	22 March 1981 (aged 28)			(Football Association of Iceland) Valur
17	MF	Erla Steina Arnardóttir	18 May 1983 (aged 26)			(Swedish Football Association) Kristianstads DFF
18	FW	Rakel Hönnudóttir	30 December 1988 (aged 20)			(Football Association of Iceland) Þór Akureyri
19	DF	Sif Atladóttir	15 July 1988 (aged 21)			(Football Association of Iceland) Valur
20	FW	Fanndís Friðriksdóttir	9 May 1990 (aged 19)			(Football Association of Iceland) Breiðablik (sports club)
21	FW	Kristín Ýr Bjarnadóttir	1 February 1984 (aged 25)			(Football Association of Iceland) Valur
22	GK	Sandra Sigurðardóttir	2 October 1986 (aged 22)			(Football Association of Iceland) Stjarnan

=== Norway ===
Head coach: (Norway) Bjarne Berntsen

No.	Pos.	Player	Date of birth (age)	Caps	Goals	Club
1	GK	Ingrid Hjelmseth	10 April 1980 (aged 29)			(Norwegian Football Federation) Stabæk FK
2	DF	Toril Hetland Akerhaugen	5 March 1982 (aged 27)			(Norwegian Football Federation) Stabæk FK
3	DF	Marita Skammelsrud Lund	29 January 1989 (aged 20)			(Norwegian Football Federation) Team Strømmen FK
4	MF	Ingvild Stensland (c)	3 August 1981 (aged 28)			(French Football Federation) Olympique Lyonnais
5	MF	Anneli Giske	25 July 1985 (aged 24)			(Norwegian Football Federation) IF Fløya
6	DF	Camilla Huse	31 August 1979 (aged 29)			(Norwegian Football Federation) Røa IL
7	MF	Trine Rønning	14 June 1982 (aged 27)			(Norwegian Football Federation) Stabæk FK
8	MF	Solveig Gulbrandsen	12 January 1981 (aged 28)			(Norwegian Football Federation) Stabæk FK
9	FW	Isabell Herlovsen	23 June 1988 (aged 21)			(Norwegian Football Federation) Kolbotn IL
10	FW	Melissa Wiik	7 February 1985 (aged 24)			(Norwegian Football Federation) Stabæk FK
11	FW	Leni Larsen Kaurin	21 March 1981 (aged 28)			(German Football Association) 1. FFC Turbine Potsdam
12	GK	Caroline Knutsen	21 November 1983 (aged 25)			(Norwegian Football Federation) Røa IL
13	GK	Christine Colombo Nilsen	30 April 1982 (aged 27)			(Norwegian Football Federation) Kolbotn IL
14	DF	Marit Sandvei	21 May 1987 (aged 22)			(Norwegian Football Federation) Team Strømmen FK
15	DF	Hedda Strand Gardsjord	28 June 1982 (aged 27)			(Norwegian Football Federation) Røa IL
16	FW	Elise Hove Thorsnes	14 August 1988 (aged 21)			(Norwegian Football Federation) Røa IL
17	DF	Maren Mjelde	6 November 1989 (aged 19)			(Norwegian Football Federation) Arna-Bjørnar
18	DF	Runa Vikestad	13 August 1984 (aged 25)			(Norwegian Football Federation) Kolbotn IL
19	FW	Ingvild Isaksen	10 February 1989 (aged 20)			(Norwegian Football Federation) Kolbotn IL
20	FW	Kristin Lie	13 December 1978 (aged 30)			(Norwegian Football Federation) Trondheims-Ørn SK
21	MF	Lene Storløkken	20 June 1981 (aged 28)			(Norwegian Football Federation) Team Strømmen FK
22	FW	Cecilie Pedersen	14 September 1990 (aged 18)			(Norwegian Football Federation) Avaldsnes IL

== Group C ==
=== England ===
Head coach: (England) Hope Powell

No.	Pos.	Player	Date of birth (age)	Caps	Goals	Club
1	GK	Rachel Brown	2 July 1980 (aged 29)			(The Football Association) Everton L.F.C.
2	DF	Alex Scott	14 October 1984 (aged 24)			(United States Soccer Federation) Boston Breakers
3	DF	Casey Stoney	13 May 1982 (aged 27)			(The Football Association) Chelsea L.F.C.
4	MF	Fara Williams	25 January 1984 (aged 25)			(The Football Association) Everton L.F.C.
5	DF	Lindsay Johnson	8 May 1980 (aged 29)			(The Football Association) Everton L.F.C.
6	MF	Anita Asante	27 April 1985 (aged 24)			(United States Soccer Federation) Sky Blue FC
7	MF	Karen Carney	1 August 1987 (aged 22)			(United States Soccer Federation) Chicago Red Stars
8	MF	Katie Chapman	15 June 1982 (aged 27)			(The Football Association) Arsenal L.F.C.
9	FW	Eniola Aluko	21 February 1987 (aged 22)			(United States Soccer Federation) Saint Louis Athletica
10	FW	Kelly Smith	29 October 1978 (aged 30)			(United States Soccer Federation) Boston Breakers
11	FW	Sue Smith	24 November 1979 (aged 29)			(The Football Association) Leeds Carnegie L.F.C.
12	MF	Jill Scott	2 February 1987 (aged 22)			(The Football Association) Everton L.F.C.
13	GK	Siobhan Chamberlain	15 August 1983 (aged 26)			(The Football Association) Chelsea L.F.C.
14	DF	Faye White (c)	2 February 1978 (aged 31)			(The Football Association) Arsenal L.F.C.
15	DF	Rachel Unitt	5 June 1982 (aged 27)			(The Football Association) Everton L.F.C.
16	FW	Jody Handley	12 March 1979 (aged 30)			(The Football Association) Everton L.F.C.
17	FW	Lianne Sanderson	3 February 1988 (aged 21)			(The Football Association) Chelsea L.F.C.
18	MF	Emily Westwood	5 April 1984 (aged 25)			(The Football Association) Everton L.F.C.
19	DF	Laura Bassett	2 August 1983 (aged 26)			(The Football Association) Arsenal L.F.C.
20	MF	Danielle Buet	31 October 1988 (aged 20)			(The Football Association) Chelsea L.F.C.
21	FW	Jessica Clarke	5 May 1989 (aged 20)			(The Football Association) Leeds Carnegie L.F.C.
22	GK	Karen Bardsley	14 October 1984 (aged 24)			(United States Soccer Federation) Sky Blue FC

=== Italy ===
Head coach: (Italy) Pietro Ghedin

No.	Pos.	Player	Date of birth (age)	Caps	Goals	Club
1	GK	Anna Maria Picarelli	4 November 1984 (aged 24)			(United States Soccer Federation) Los Angeles Legends
2	DF	Sara Gama	27 March 1989 (aged 20)			(Italian Football Federation) UPC Tavagnacco
3	DF	Roberta D'Adda	5 October 1981 (aged 27)			(Italian Football Federation) A.S.D. CF Bardolino
4	MF	Alessia Tuttino	15 March 1983 (aged 26)			(Italian Football Federation) A.S.D. CF Bardolino
5	DF	Elisabetta Tona	22 January 1984 (aged 25)			(Italian Football Federation) A.S.D. Torres Calcio
6	DF	Viviana Schiavi	1 September 1982 (aged 26)			(Italian Football Federation) A.S.D. CF Bardolino
7	MF	Giulia Domenichetti	29 April 1984 (aged 25)			(Italian Football Federation) A.S.D. Torres Calcio
8	FW	Melania Gabbiadini	28 August 1983 (aged 25)			(Italian Football Federation) A.S.D. CF Bardolino
9	FW	Patrizia Panico (c)	8 February 1975 (aged 34)			(Italian Football Federation) A.S.D. Torres Calcio
10	MF	Tatiana Zorri	19 October 1977 (aged 31)			(Italian Football Federation) S.S. Lazio Femminile
11	FW	Silvia Fuselli	1 July 1981 (aged 28)			(Italian Football Federation) A.S.D. Torres Calcio
12	GK	Michela Cupido	2 May 1978 (aged 31)			(Italian Football Federation) A.S.D. Torres Calcio
13	DF	Giorgia Motta	18 March 1984 (aged 25)			(Italian Football Federation) A.S.D. CF Bardolino
14	MF	Alice Parisi	11 December 1990 (aged 18)			(Italian Football Federation) A.S.D. CF Bardolino
15	DF	Alia Guagni	1 October 1987 (aged 21)			(Italian Football Federation) ACF Firenze
16	DF	Laura Neboli	14 March 1988 (aged 21)			(Italian Football Federation) AC Reggiana Femminile
17	FW	Evelyn Vicchiarello	24 October 1986 (aged 22)			(Italian Football Federation) AC Reggiana Femminile
18	MF	Pamela Conti	4 April 1982 (aged 27)			(Royal Spanish Football Federation) Levante UD Femenino
19	MF	Carolina Pini	13 June 1989 (aged 20)			(German Football Association) FC Bayern Munich
20	DF	Raffaella Manieri	21 November 1986 (aged 22)			(Italian Football Federation) A.S.D. Torres Calcio
21	MF	Marta Carissimi	3 May 1987 (aged 22)			(Italian Football Federation) ACF Torino
22	GK	Sara Penzo	16 December 1989 (aged 19)			(Italian Football Federation) CF Venezia

=== Russia ===
Head coach: (Russia) Igor Shalimov

No.	Pos.	Player	Date of birth (age)	Caps	Goals	Club
1	GK	Elvira Todua	31 January 1986 (aged 23)			(Russian Football Union) WFC Rossiyanka
2	FW	Elena Terekhova	5 July 1987 (aged 22)			(Russian Football Union) WFC Rossiyanka
3	DF	Anna Kozhnikova	10 July 1987 (aged 22)			(Russian Football Union) WFC Rossiyanka
4	MF	Ekaterina Sochneva	12 August 1985 (aged 24)			(Russian Football Union) ShVSM-Izmaylovo Moskva
5	MF	Tatiana Skotnikova (c)	27 November 1978 (aged 30)			(Russian Football Union) WFC Rossiyanka
6	DF	Nadezhda Myskiv	7 March 1988 (aged 21)			(Russian Football Union) WFC Rossiyanka
7	DF	Oksana Shmachkova	20 June 1981 (aged 28)			(Russian Football Union) WFC Rossiyanka
8	DF	Valentina Savchenkova	29 April 1983 (aged 26)			(Russian Football Union) Zvezda-2005
9	MF	Elena Fomina	5 April 1979 (aged 30)			(Russian Football Union) ShVSM-Izmaylovo Moskva
10	FW	Olesya Kurochkina	6 September 1983 (aged 25)			(Russian Football Union) Zvezda-2005
11	DF	Olga Poryadina	10 December 1980 (aged 28)			(Russian Football Union) WFC Rossiyanka
12	GK	Elena Kochneva	27 August 1989 (aged 19)			(Russian Football Union) ShVSM-Izmaylovo Moskva
13	MF	Alla Rogova	27 July 1983 (aged 26)			(Russian Football Union) ShVSM-Izmaylovo Moskva
14	MF	Nadezhda Kharchenko	27 March 1987 (aged 22)			(Russian Football Union) WFC Rossiyanka
15	MF	Olga Petrova	9 July 1986 (aged 23)			(Russian Football Union) WFC Rossiyanka
16	DF	Natalia Pertseva	4 June 1984 (aged 25)			(Russian Football Union) WFC Rossiyanka
17	FW	Elena Danilova	17 June 1987 (aged 22)			(Russian Football Union) WFC Rossiyanka
18	MF	Svetlana Tsydikova	4 February 1985 (aged 24)			(Russian Football Union) FC Energy Voronezh
19	DF	Ksenia Tsybutovich	26 June 1987 (aged 22)			(Russian Football Union) Zvezda-2005
20	MF	Natalia Barbashina	26 August 1973 (aged 35)			(Russian Football Union) Zvezda-2005
21	MF	Elena Morozova	15 March 1987 (aged 22)			(Russian Football Union) WFC Rossiyanka
22	GK	Galina Vazhnova	18 January 1968 (aged 41)			(Russian Football Union) WFC Rossiyanka

=== Sweden ===
Head coach: (Sweden) Thomas Dennerby

No.	Pos.	Player	Date of birth (age)	Caps	Goals	Club
1	GK	Hedvig Lindahl	29 April 1983 (aged 26)			(Swedish Football Association) Kopparbergs/Göteborg FC
2	DF	Charlotte Rohlin	2 December 1980 (aged 28)			(Swedish Football Association) Linköpings FC
3	DF	Stina Segerström	17 June 1982 (aged 27)			(Swedish Football Association) Kopparbergs/Göteborg FC
4	DF	Anna Paulson	29 February 1984 (aged 25)			(Swedish Football Association) Umeå IK
5	MF	Caroline Seger	19 March 1985 (aged 24)			(Swedish Football Association) Linköpings FC
6	DF	Sara Thunebro	26 April 1979 (aged 30)			(Swedish Football Association) Djurgårdens IF Fotboll (women)
7	DF	Sara Larsson	13 May 1979 (aged 30)			(United States Soccer Federation) Saint Louis Athletica
8	FW	Lotta Schelin	27 February 1984 (aged 25)			(French Football Federation) Olympique Lyonnais
9	FW	Jessica Landström	12 December 1984 (aged 24)			(Swedish Football Association) Linköpings FC
10	FW	Kosovare Asllani	29 July 1989 (aged 20)			(Swedish Football Association) Linköpings FC
11	FW	Victoria Sandell Svensson (c)	18 May 1977 (aged 32)			(Swedish Football Association) Djurgårdens IF Fotboll (women)
12	GK	Kristin Hammarström	29 March 1982 (aged 27)			(Swedish Football Association) KIF Örebro DFF
13	DF	Karin Lissel	25 May 1987 (aged 22)			(Swedish Football Association) Hammarby IF DFF
14	MF	Louise Fors	23 October 1989 (aged 19)			(Swedish Football Association) AIK Fotboll Dam
15	MF	Therese Sjögran	8 April 1977 (aged 32)			(Swedish Football Association) LdB FC Malmö
16	MF	Petra Larsson	30 September 1988 (aged 20)			(Swedish Football Association) Linköpings FC
17	MF	Lisa Dahlkvist	6 February 1987 (aged 22)			(Swedish Football Association) Umeå IK
18	MF	Nilla Fischer	2 August 1984 (aged 25)			(Swedish Football Association) LdB FC Malmö
19	MF	Sara Lindén	1 September 1983 (aged 25)			(Swedish Football Association) Kopparbergs/Göteborg FC
20	FW	Linnea Liljegärd	8 December 1988 (aged 20)			(Swedish Football Association) Kopparbergs/Göteborg FC
21	GK	Ulla-Karin Rönnlund	19 February 1977 (aged 32)			(Swedish Football Association) Umeå IK
22	DF	Lina Nilsson	17 June 1987 (aged 22)			(Swedish Football Association) LdB FC Malmö
