= 2008 Algarve Cup =

International women's football tournament

Tournament details
- Host country: Portugal
- Dates: 5–12 March 2008
- Teams: 12 (from 3 confederations)
- Venue: 9 (in 9 host cities)

Final positions
- Champions: United States (6th title)
- Runners-up: Denmark
- Third place: Norway

Tournament statistics
- Matches played: 24
- Goals scored: 68 (2.83 per match)
- Top scorer: (Iceland) Margrét Lára Viðarsdóttir (6 goals)
- Best player: (Denmark) Cathrine Paaske Sørensen

The 2008 Algarve Cup was the fifteenth edition of the Algarve Cup, an invitational women's football tournament held annually in Portugal. It took place between 5 and 12 March 2008 with the reigning champions the United States winning the event for a record sixth time, after defeating Denmark, 2–1, in the final game in a repeat of the previous year's final.

== Format ==
The twelve invited teams were split into three groups that played a round-robin tournament. The entrants were almost identical to the previous year, but Italy moved up into Group B from their previous ranking in 2007, replacing France who did not feature this time. Poland appeared in the competition for the first time.

Groups A and B, containing the strongest ranked teams, were the only ones in contention to win the title. The group winners from A and B contested the final, with the runners-up playing for third place and those that finished third in these two groups playing for fifth place.

The teams in Group C were playing for places 7–12, with the winner of Group C playing the team that finished fourth in Group A or B with the better record for seventh place and the Group C runner-up playing the team which came last in Group A or B with the worse record for ninth place. The third and fourth-placed teams in Group C played for eleventh place.

Points awarded in the group stage follow the standard formula of three points for a win, one point for a draw and zero points for a loss. In the case of two teams being tied on the same number of points in a group, their head-to-head result determined the higher placed.

== Teams ==
The twelve invited teams were:

Team	FIFA Rankings (December 2007)
Germany	1
United States	2
Sweden	3
Norway	5
Denmark	8
China	13
Italy	14
Finland	16
Iceland	21
Poland	27
Republic of Ireland	31
Portugal (hosts)	47

== Group stage ==
All times local (WET/UTC+0)

=== Group A ===
Team	Pts	Pld	W	D	L	GF	GA	GD
Denmark	9	3	3	0	0	3	0	+3
Germany	6	3	2	0	1	5	1	+4
Sweden	3	3	1	0	2	3	4	−1
Finland	0	3	0	0	3	1	7	−6

5 March 2008
13:15

Germany	0–1	Denmark
		Pedersen 46'

Estádio Algarve, Faro

5 March 2008
15:45

Finland	1–3	Sweden
Talonen 64'	SvFF Report (in Swedish)	Ljungberg 25'; Fischer 29'; Lundin 87'

Municipal Stadium, Lagos

7 March 2008
13:15

Germany	3–0	Finland
Prinz 17', 28'; Lingor 37' (pen)

Estádio Algarve, Faro

7 March 2008
14:00

Denmark	1–0	Sweden
Sørensen 6'	SvFF Report (in Swedish)

Municipal Stadium, Lagos

10 March 2008
13:15

Denmark	1–0	Finland
Sørensen 47'

Municipal Stadium, Lagos

10 March 2008
13:15

Sweden	0–2	Germany
	SvFF Report (in Swedish)	Smisek 25'; Prinz 86' (pen)

Municipal Stadium, Vila Real de Santo António

=== Group B ===
Team	Pts	Pld	W	D	L	GF	GA	GD
United States	9	3	3	0	0	10	0	+10
Norway	6	3	2	0	1	7	7	0
Italy	3	3	1	0	2	4	6	−2
China	0	3	0	0	3	1	9	−8

5 March 2008
13:45

China	0–4	United States
	Report	Tarpley 5'; Heath 47'; Wambach 64'; Lloyd 69'

Municipal Stadium, Albufeira

5 March 2008
16:15

Norway	4–2	Italy
Thorsnes 9'; Storløkken 47'; Stangeland Horpestad 63' (pen); Kaurin 74'		Panico 34'; Gabbiadini 86'

Restinga Stadium, Alvor

7 March 2008
13:45

United States	2–0	Italy
Tarpley 5'; O'Reilly 74'	Report

Restinga Stadium, Alvor

7 March 2008
16:15

Norway	3–1	China
unknown 42' (o.g.); Storløkken 64'; Wiik 90'		Guo Yue 62'

Municipal Stadium, Albufeira

10 March 2008
15:00

China	0–2	Italy
		Conti 41'; Panico 70'

Municipal Stadium, Loulé

10 March 2008
15:00

United States	4–0	Norway
Kai 55'; Wambach 57'; O'Reilly 65'; Rodriguez 90'	Report

Restinga Stadium, Alvor

=== Group C ===
Team	Pts	Pld	W	D	L	GF	GA	GD
Iceland	9	3	3	0	0	9	1	+8
Portugal	6	3	2	0	1	5	4	+1
Republic of Ireland	3	3	1	0	2	2	6	−4
Poland	0	3	0	0	3	1	6	−5

5 March 2008
13:15

Iceland	2–0	Poland
Stefánsdóttir 58'; Viðarsdóttir 81'

Municipal Stadium, Lagos

5 March 2008
15:45

Portugal	2–0	Republic of Ireland
Fernandes 86'; Vieira 90+2'

Estádio Algarve, Faro

7 March 2008
15:30

Portugal	3–1	Poland
Couto 17'; Fernandes 44'; Vieira 80'		Bochra 42'

Estádio Algarve, Faro

7 March 2008
16:30

Republic of Ireland	1–4	Iceland
Grant 23'		Arnardóttir 7'; Viðarsdóttir 12', 40'; Gunnarsdóttir 19'

Municipal Stadium, Lagos

10 March 2008
15:45

Portugal	0–3	Iceland
		Viðarsdóttir 15', 17'; Jónsdóttir 69'

Municipal Stadium, Vila Real de Santo António

10 March 2008
15:45

Poland	0–1	Republic of Ireland
		Grant 35'

Municipal Stadium, Lagos

== Placement play-offs ==
All times local (WET/UTC+0)

=== 11th place ===
12 March 2008
10:00

Republic of Ireland	2–2 (5–6 PSO)	Poland
O'Brien; O'Gorman		Stobba 23'; Winczo 48'

Arsenio Catuna Complex, Guia

=== 9th place ===
12 March 2008
10:00

China	1–1 (5–4 PSO)	Portugal
Bi Yan 1'		Fernandes 34'
Penalties
Li Jie (penalty scored); Xu Yuan (penalty scored); Wang Kun (penalty missed); Ying (penalty scored); Bi Yan (penalty scored); Song Xiaoli (penalty scored)	5 – 4	(penalty scored) Matias; (penalty scored) Vieira; (penalty missed) Fernandes; (penalty scored) Brandão; (penalty scored) Couto; (penalty missed) Valinho

CD Montechoro, Albufeira

=== 7th place ===
12 March 2008
10:30

Finland	0–3	Iceland
		Viðarsdóttir 12'; Hönnudóttir 41'; Gunnarsdóttir 90'

Municipal Stadium, Loulé

=== 5th place ===
12 March 2008
10:30

Sweden	3–0	Italy
Öqvist 56'; Svensson 61', 80'	SvFF Report (in Swedish)

José Arcanjo Stadium, Olhão

=== 3rd place ===
12 March 2008
10:00

Germany	0–2	Norway
		Wiik 41'; Knutsen 50'

Municipal Stadium, Vila Real de Santo António

== Final ==
12 March 2008
13:15

Denmark	1–2	United States
Sørensen 31'	Report	Kai 14'; Wambach 50'

Municipal Stadium, Vila Real de Santo António
Referee: Schett (Austria)

DENMARK:
GK	1	Heidi Johansen
DF	2	Mia Olsen	(substituted off) 76'
DF	3	Katrine Pedersen
DF	4	Christina Ørntoft
DF	5	Bettina Falk	(substituted off) 76'
MF	6	Mariann Gajhede
MF	7	Cathrine Paaske Sørensen
MF	10	Camilla Sand	(substituted off) 76'
FW	9	Maiken Pape	(substituted off) 54'
FW	11	Merete Pedersen
FW	13	Johanna Rasmussen
Substitutes:
MF	8	Janne Madsen	(substituted in) 54'
MF	12	Line Røddik	(substituted in) 76'
FW	14	Marie Herping
DF	15	Marie Bjerg	(substituted in) 76'
GK	16	Tine Cederkvist
DF	17	Mette V. Jensen
MF	18	Theresa Nielsen
FW	19	Sine Hovesen	(substituted in) 76'
DF	20	Sanne Troelsgaard
Manager:
(Denmark) Kenneth Heiner-Møller

UNITED STATES:
GK	18	Hope Solo
DF	3	Christie Rampone
DF	14	Stephanie Cox	(yellow card) 60'	(substituted off) 74'
DF	15	Kate Markgraf
DF	17	Lori Chalupny
MF	5	Lindsay Tarpley		(substituted off) 77'
MF	9	Heather O'Reilly		(substituted off) 46'
MF	11	Carli Lloyd		(substituted off) 35'
MF	12	Leslie Osborne
FW	6	Natasha Kai		(substituted off) 81'
FW	20	Abby Wambach		(substituted off) 88'
Substitutes:
DF	4	Cat Whitehill
MF	7	Shannon Boxx
MF	8	Lauren Cheney		(substituted in) 88'
MF	10	Angie Woznuk		(substituted in) 77'
MF	16	Angela Hucles		(substituted in) 35'
FW	19	Amy Rodriguez		(substituted in) 81'
DF	20	Tobin Heath		(substituted in) 46'
GK	24	Nicole Barnhart
DF	26	Rachel Buehler		(substituted in) 74'
Manager:
(Sweden) Pia Sundhage

2008 Algarve Cup

United States
Sixth title
