= 2013 in Norwegian football =

Football in Norway
- Season: 2013

Men's football
- Tippeligaen: Strømsgodset
- 1. divisjon: Bodø/Glimt
- 2. divisjon: Bærum (Group 1); Alta (Group 2); Nest-Sotra (Group 3); Tromsdalen (Group 4)
- Cupen: Molde

Women's football
- Toppserien: Stabæk
- 1. divisjon: Grand Bodø
- Cupen: Stabæk

The 2013 in Norwegian football season was the 108th edition of competitive football in Norway.

The season began in March and ended in November with the 2013 Norwegian Football Cup Final.

== Men's football ==
=== Promotion and relegation ===
Teams promoted to Tippeligaen

- Start
- Sarpsborg 08

Teams relegated from Tippeligaen

- Stabæk
- Fredrikstad

Teams promoted to 1. divisjon

- Elverum
- Kristiansund
- Vard Haugesund
- Follo

Teams relegated from 1. divisjon

- Tromsdalen
- Bærum
- Notodden
- Alta

Teams promoted to the 2. divisjon

- Drøbak/Frogn
- Skedsmo
- Lyn
- Eidsvold Turn
- Arendal
- Viking 2
- Arna-Bjørnar
- Førde
- Skarbøvik
- Strindheim
- Bodø/Glimt 2
- Bossekop

Teams relegated from the 2. divisjon

- Ørn-Horten
- Lillehammer
- Brumunddal

=== League season ===
==== Tippeligaen ====
Pos	Team	Pld	W	D	L	GF	GA	GD	Pts	Qualification or relegation
1	Strømsgodset (C)	30	19	6	5	66	26	+40	63	Qualification for the Champions League second qualifying round
2	Rosenborg	30	18	8	4	50	25	+25	62	Qualification for the Europa League first qualifying round
3	Haugesund	30	15	6	9	41	39	+2	51	Qualification for the Europa League first qualifying round
4	Aalesund	30	14	7	9	55	44	+11	49	
5	Viking	30	12	10	8	41	36	+5	46	
6	Molde	30	12	8	10	47	38	+9	44	Qualification for the Europa League second qualifying round (Note: Molde qualified for the second qualifying round of the UEFA Europa League as winners of the 2013 Norwegian Cup.)
7	Odd	30	11	7	12	43	39	+4	40	
8	Brann	30	11	6	13	46	46	0	39	
9	Start	30	10	8	12	43	46	−3	38	
10	Lillestrøm	30	9	9	12	37	44	−7	36	
11	Vålerenga	30	10	6	14	41	50	−9	36	
12	Sogndal	30	8	9	13	33	48	−15	33	
13	Sandnes Ulf	30	9	6	15	36	58	−22	33	
14	Sarpsborg 08 (O)	30	8	7	15	40	58	−18	31	Qualification for the relegation play-offs
15	Tromsø (R)	30	7	8	15	41	50	−9	29	Europa League qualifying and relegation to First Division (Note: Norway was among the best three associations in the UEFA Fair Play ranking and thus received an additional spot in the first qualifying round of the Europa League, Tromsø IL received the qualifying spot for their ranking in Tippeligaen's Fair Play ranking.)
16	Hønefoss (R)	30	6	11	13	34	47	−13	29	Relegation to First Division

Source: fotball.no
Rules for classification: 1) points; 2) goal difference; 3) number of goals scored.
(C) Champions; (O) Play-off winners; (R) Relegated

==== 1. divisjon ====
Pos	Team	Pld	W	D	L	GF	GA	GD	Pts	Promotion or relegation
1	Bodø/Glimt (C, P)	30	21	4	5	63	24	+39	67	Promotion to Tippeligaen
2	Stabæk (P)	30	14	10	6	51	46	+5	52	Promotion to Tippeligaen
3	Hødd	30	15	5	10	41	31	+10	50	Qualification for the promotion play-offs
4	Ranheim	30	14	7	9	49	38	+11	49	Qualification for the promotion play-offs
5	HamKam	30	14	6	10	49	43	+6	48	Qualification for the promotion play-offs
6	Mjøndalen	30	14	5	11	37	40	−3	47	Qualification for the promotion play-offs
7	Bryne	30	13	7	10	55	50	+5	46	
8	Sandefjord	30	12	7	11	39	39	0	43	
9	Kristiansund BK	30	12	6	12	47	44	+3	42	
10	Fredrikstad	30	11	8	11	44	41	+3	41	
11	Strømmen	30	9	11	10	39	43	−4	38	
12	Ullensaker/Kisa	30	9	7	14	46	48	−2	34	
13	Vard Haugesund (R)	30	9	7	14	46	55	−9	34	Relegation to Second Division
14	Kongsvinger (R)	30	7	10	13	37	54	−17	31	Relegation to Second Division
15	Follo (Note: Follo were docked 2 points for lack of financial control) (R)	30	9	2	19	40	57	−17	27	Relegation to Second Division
16	Elverum (R)	30	3	6	21	37	67	−30	15	Relegation to Second Division

Source: nifs.no
Rules for classification: 1) points; 2) goal difference; 3) number of goals scored.
(C) Champions; (P) Promoted; (R) Relegated

==== 2. divisjon ====
===== Group 1 =====
Pos	Team	Pld	W	D	L	GF	GA	GD	Pts	Promotion or relegation
1	Bærum (P)	26	19	3	4	84	38	+46	60	Promotion to First Division
2	Asker	26	17	5	4	80	37	+43	56	
3	Førde	26	17	0	9	64	47	+17	51	
4	Træff	26	13	3	10	45	46	−1	42	
5	Kvik Halden	26	12	5	9	34	35	−1	41	
6	Kjelsås	26	12	4	10	39	37	+2	40	
7	Drøbak-Frogn	26	12	4	10	41	47	−6	40	
8	Vålerenga 2	26	12	0	14	47	47	0	36	
9	Moss	26	10	3	13	47	53	−6	33	
10	Birkebeineren	26	10	3	13	38	46	−8	33	
11	Molde 2	26	9	1	16	49	63	−14	28	
12	Skarbøvik (R)	26	7	5	14	45	52	−7	26	Relegation to Third Division
13	Østsiden (R)	26	6	5	15	35	50	−15	23	Relegation to Third Division
14	Nesodden (R)	26	3	5	18	23	73	−50	14	Relegation to Third Division

Source: nifs.no
Rules for classification: 1) points; 2) goal difference; 3) number of goals scored.
(P) Promoted; (R) Relegated

===== Group 2 =====
Pos	Team	Pld	W	D	L	GF	GA	GD	Pts	Promotion or relegation
1	Alta (P)	26	18	3	5	71	35	+36	57	Promotion to First Division
2	Raufoss	26	16	3	7	54	35	+19	51	
3	Fram Larvik	26	14	8	4	62	34	+28	50	
4	Lyn	26	11	8	7	47	32	+15	41	
5	Pors Grenland	26	12	5	9	44	44	0	41	
6	Nybergsund-Trysil	26	11	7	8	50	56	−6	40	
7	Valdres	26	11	4	11	49	46	+3	37	
8	Strømsgodset 2	26	11	1	14	59	77	−18	34	
9	Gjøvik FF	26	9	6	11	39	48	−9	33	
10	Harstad	26	8	8	10	44	44	0	32	
11	Odd 2	26	9	5	12	41	60	−19	32	
12	Frigg (R)	26	7	4	15	42	45	−3	25	Relegation to Third Division
13	FK Tønsberg (R)	26	5	5	16	44	67	−23	20	Relegation to Third Division
14	Bossekop (R)	26	4	5	17	28	51	−23	17	Relegation to Third Division

Source: nifs.no
Rules for classification: 1) points; 2) goal difference; 3) number of goals scored.
(P) Promoted; (R) Relegated

===== Group 3 =====
Pos	Team	Pld	W	D	L	GF	GA	GD	Pts	Promotion or relegation
1	Nest-Sotra (P)	26	20	3	3	74	25	+49	63	Promotion to First Division
2	Vindbjart	26	15	4	7	67	38	+29	49	
3	Notodden	26	13	3	10	48	34	+14	42	
4	Fyllingsdalen	26	11	5	10	42	44	−2	38	
5	Arendal	26	11	4	11	36	42	−6	37	
6	Brann 2	26	11	2	13	54	54	0	35	
7	Egersund	26	10	5	11	41	45	−4	35	
8	Fana	26	10	5	11	40	47	−7	35	
9	Ålgård	26	9	6	11	38	38	0	33	
10	Åsane	26	10	3	13	45	48	−3	33	
11	Vidar	26	10	3	13	49	66	−17	33	
12	Flekkerøy	26	8	6	12	40	45	−5	30	
13	Viking 2 (R)	26	8	6	12	34	43	−9	30	Relegation to Third Division
14	Arna-Bjørnar (R)	26	8	1	17	28	67	−39	25	Relegation to Third Division

Source: nifs.no
Rules for classification: 1) points; 2) goal difference; 3) number of goals scored.
(P) Promoted; (R) Relegated

===== Group 4 =====
Pos	Team	Pld	W	D	L	GF	GA	GD	Pts	Promotion or relegation
1	Tromsdalen (P)	26	19	5	2	70	31	+39	62	Promotion to First Division
2	KFUM Oslo	26	17	6	3	62	26	+36	57	
3	Levanger	26	13	5	8	61	43	+18	44	
4	Grorud	26	11	7	8	60	51	+9	40	
5	Byåsen	26	12	4	10	52	44	+8	40	
6	Mo	26	12	4	10	47	44	+3	40	
7	Eidsvold TF	26	10	6	10	43	51	−8	36	
8	Tromsø 2 (R)	26	11	1	14	51	77	−26	34	Relegation to Third Division
9	Nardo	26	8	8	10	50	49	+1	32	
10	Lørenskog	26	8	7	11	49	56	−7	31	
11	Rosenborg 2	26	8	6	12	52	63	−11	30	
12	Strindheim (R)	26	6	5	15	51	60	−9	23	Relegation to Third Division
13	Skedsmo (R)	26	5	6	15	32	68	−36	21	Relegation to Third Division
14	Senja (R)	26	6	2	18	41	58	−17	20	Relegation to Third Division

Source: nifs.no
Rules for classification: 1) points; 2) goal difference; 3) number of goals scored.
(P) Promoted; (R) Relegated

=== Norwegian Cup ===
==== Final ====
24 November 2013
13:15 CET (UTC+1)

Rosenborg	2–4	Molde
Diskerud 17'; Reginiussen 49'	Report	Rindarøy 16'; Berget 71'; Hoseth 82'; Høiland 90'

Ullevaal Stadion, Oslo
Attendance: 24,824
Referee: Svein Oddvar Moen (Haugar)

== Women's football ==
=== League season ===
==== Toppserien ====
Pos	Team	Pld	W	D	L	GF	GA	GD	Pts	Qualification or relegation
1	Stabæk (C)	22	17	4	1	64	9	+55	55	Qualification for the Champions League round of 32
2	LSK Kvinner	22	15	4	3	51	18	+33	49	
3	Arna-Bjørnar	22	10	8	4	39	24	+15	38	
4	Avaldsnes	22	10	3	9	39	33	+6	33	
5	Vålerenga	22	8	8	6	41	37	+4	32	
6	Kolbotn	22	9	4	9	39	42	−3	31	
7	Trondheims-Ørn	22	9	3	10	39	49	−10	30	
8	Røa	22	7	7	8	25	33	−8	28	
9	Medkila	22	7	5	10	27	44	−17	26	
10	Klepp	22	6	3	13	29	50	−21	21	
11	Amazon Grimstad (O)	22	3	6	13	22	39	−17	15	Qualification for the relegation play-offs
12	Sandviken (R)	22	3	1	18	19	56	−37	10	Relegation to First Division

Source: NIFS
Rules for classification: 1) points; 2) goal difference; 3) number of goals scored.
(C) Champions; (O) Play-off winners; (R) Relegated

=== Norwegian Women's Cup ===
==== Final ====
- Avaldsnes 0–1 Stabæk

== Men's UEFA competitions ==
=== Champions League ===
==== Qualifying phase ====
===== Second qualifying round =====
Team 1	Agg.	Team 2	1st leg	2nd leg
Sligo Rovers (Republic of Ireland)	0–3	(Norway) Molde	0–1	0–2

===== Third qualifying round =====
Team 1	Agg.	Team 2	1st leg	2nd leg
Molde (Norway)	1–1 (a)	(Poland) Legia Warsaw	1–1	0–0

=== UEFA Europa League ===
==== Qualifying phase ====
===== First qualifying round =====
Team 1	Agg.	Team 2	1st leg	2nd leg
Tromsø (Norway)	3–2	(Slovenia) Celje	1–2	2–0
Crusaders (Northern Ireland)	3–9	(Norway) Rosenborg	1–2	2–7

===== Second qualifying round =====
Team 1	Agg.	Team 2	1st leg	2nd leg
Hødd (Norway)	1–2	(Kazakhstan) Aktobe	1–0	0–2
Strømsgodset (Norway)	5–2	(Hungary) Debrecen	2–2	3–0
Tromsø (Norway)	2–1	(Azerbaijan) Inter Baku	2–0	0–1
Rosenborg (Norway)	1–2	(Scotland) St Johnstone	0–1	1–1

===== Third qualifying round =====
Team 1	Agg.	Team 2	1st leg	2nd leg
Tromsø (Norway)	1–1 (4–3 p)	(Luxembourg) Differdange 03	1–0	0–1 (a.e.t.)
Jablonec (Czech Republic)	5–2	(Norway) Strømsgodset	2–1	3–1

===== Play-off round =====
Team 1	Agg.	Team 2	1st leg	2nd leg
Tromsø (Norway)	2–3	(Turkey) Beşiktaş	2–1	0–2
Molde (Norway)	0–5	(Russia) Rubin Kazan	0–2	0–3

==== Group stage ====
===== Group K =====
Pos	Team	Pld	W	D	L	GF	GA	GD	Pts	Qualification	TOT	ANZ	SHE	TRO
1	(England) Tottenham Hotspur	6	6	0	0	15	2	+13	18	Advance to knockout phase	—	4–1	2–1	3–0
2	(Russia) Anzhi Makhachkala	6	2	2	2	4	7	−3	8	Advance to knockout phase	0–2	—	1–1	1–0
3	(Moldova) Sheriff Tiraspol	6	1	3	2	5	6	−1	6		0–2	0–0	—	2–0
4	(Norway) Tromsø	6	0	1	5	1	10	−9	1		0–2	0–1	1–1	—

Source: Soccerway

== UEFA Women's Champions League ==
=== Knockout phase ===
==== Round of 32 ====
Team 1	Agg.	Team 2	1st leg	2nd leg
LSK Kvinner (Norway)	1–8	(Sweden) LdB Malmö	1–3	0–5

== National teams ==
=== Norway men's national football team ===
==== 2014 FIFA World Cup qualification (UEFA) ====
During the season, the Norway national team played five games in the qualification for 2014 FIFA World Cup.

===== Group E =====
Pos	Team	Pld	W	D	L	GF	GA	GD	Pts	Qualification	Switzerland national football team	Iceland national football team	Slovenia national football team	Norway national football team	Albania national football team	Cyprus national football team
1	Switzerland	10	7	3	0	17	6	+11	24	Qualification to 2014 FIFA World Cup	—	4–4	1–0	1–1	2–0	1–0
2	Iceland	10	5	2	3	17	15	+2	17	Advance to second round	0–2	—	2–4	2–0	2–1	2–0
3	Slovenia	10	5	0	5	14	11	+3	15		0–2	1–2	—	3–0	1–0	2–1
4	Norway	10	3	3	4	10	13	−3	12		0–2	1–1	2–1	—	0–1	2–0
5	Albania	10	3	2	5	9	11	−2	11		1–2	1–2	1–0	1–1	—	3–1
6	Cyprus	10	1	2	7	4	15	−11	5		0–0	1–0	0–2	1–3	0–0	—

22 March 2013	Norway	0–1	Albania	Oslo
19:00	Forren (yellow card) 52'		Roshi (yellow card) 43'; Salihi 67'; Lila (yellow card) 85'; Lila (red card)	Stadium: Ullevaal Stadion; Attendance: 11,207; Referee: Kevin Blom (Netherlands)

6 September 2013	Norway	2–0	Cyprus	Oslo
19:00 UTC+2	Elyounoussi 43'; King 66'	Report		Stadium: Ullevaal Stadion; Attendance: 11,295; Referee: Kenn Hansen (Denmark)

10 September 2013	Norway	0–2	Switzerland	Oslo
19:00 UTC+2		Report	Schär 12', 51'	Stadium: Ullevaal Stadion; Attendance: 16,631; Referee: Howard Webb (England)

11 October 2013	Slovenia	3–0	Norway	Maribor
	Novaković 13', 15', 49'		Hangeland (yellow card) 90'	Stadium: Ljudski vrt Attendance: 10,890; Referee: Carlos Velasco Carballo (Spain)

15 October 2013	Norway	1–1	Iceland	Oslo
20:00	Braaten 30'	Report	Sigþórsson 12'; Sævarsson (yellow card) 38'	Stadium: Ullevaal Stadion; Attendance: 6,796; Referee: Paolo Tagliavento (Italy)

==== Friendlies ====
8 January 2013	South Africa	0–1	Norway	Cape Town
18:30	Letsholonyane (yellow card) 86'	Summary	Elyounoussi 41'; Vilsvik (yellow card) 56'; Fellah (yellow card) 78'; Semb Berge (yellow card) 85'	Stadium: Cape Town Stadium; Attendance: 30,000; Referee: Rainhold Shikongo (Namibia)

12 January 2013	Zambia	0–0	Norway	Ndola
12:00		Summary	Ruud (yellow card) 55'; Jenssen (yellow card) 90'	Stadium: Levy Mwanawasa Stadium; Referee: Victor Hlungwani (South Africa)

6 February 2013	Norway	0–2	Ukraine	Seville
18:00		Summary	Morozyuk 17'; Yarmolenko 42'; Mandzyuk (red card) 84'; Fedetskiy (yellow card) 87'	Stadium: Estadio de La Cartuja; Attendance: 14,000; Referee: Carlos Clos (Spain)

11 June 2013	Norway	2–0	North Macedonia	Oslo
19:00	Skjelbred 9'; Wæhler (yellow card) 37'; Braaten 79'	Summary	Mojsov (yellow card) 31'; Grnčarov (yellow card) 60' (red card) 60'	Stadium: Ullevaal Stadion; Attendance: 8,756; Referee: Liran Liany (Israel)

14 August 2013	Sweden	4–2	Norway	Stockholm
20:00	Ibrahimović 2', 28', 57'; Svensson 75'	Summary	Abdellaoue 38' (pen.); Johansen 43'	Stadium: Friends Arena; Attendance: 13,438; Referee: Michael Oliver (England)

=== Norway women's national football team ===
==== Friendlies ====
12 January 2013	South Korea	0–2	Norway	Youngchuan, China
17:00		Report	Thorsnes 28'; Kaurin 76'	Stadium: Youngchuan Sports Center; Attendance: 4,000; Referee: Shi Zhenlu (China)

14 January 2013	China	0–1	Norway	Youngchuan, China
16:00		Report	Bjånesøy 88'	Stadium: Youngchuan Sports Center; Attendance: 5,000; Referee: Yao Qing (China)

16 January 2013	Canada	0–0	Norway	Chongchuan, China
17:00		Report		Stadium: Chongchuan Sports Center; Attendance: 1,000; Referee: Wang Zhe (China)

6 April 2013	Switzerland	3–1	Norway	Nyon, Switzerland
14:30	Mändly 2'; Crnogorčević 33', 77' (pen.)	Report	Hegerberg 45'	Stadium: Colovray Sports Centre; Attendance: 873; Referee: Simona Ghisletta (Switzerland)

==== 2013 Algarve Cup ====
===== Group A =====
6 March 2013	Norway	2–0	Japan	Portimao, Portugal
13:10	Hansen 8'; Hegerberg 16'	Report		Stadium: Municipal Stadium Bela Vista; Attendance: 500; Referee: Carol Anne Chenard (Canada)

8 March 2013	Norway	0–0	Denmark	Portimao, Portugal
16:00		Report		Stadium: Municipal Stadium Bela Vista; Attendance: 348; Referee: Katalin Kulcsar (Hungary)

11 March 2013	Germany	2–0	Norway	Lagos, Portugal
12:20	Šašić 52'; Keßler 86'	Report		Stadium: Estadio Municipal Lagos; Attendance: 878; Referee: Salome di Iorio (Argentina)

===== Third place match =====
13 March 2013	Norway	2–2 (a.e.t.) (5–4 p)	Sweden	Lagos, Portugal
12:00	Hegland 39'; Hegerberg 90'	Report	Asllani 15'; Göransson 46'	Stadium: Estadio Municipal Lagos; Attendance: 310; Referee: Efthalia Mitsi (Greece)
	Penalties
	Christensen (penalty scored); Bjånesøy (penalty missed); Isaksen (penalty scored); Stensland (penalty scored); Gulbrandsen (penalty scored); Kaurin (penalty scored)		(penalty scored) Hammarström; (penalty scored) Thunebro; (penalty scored) Holmberg; (penalty scored) Göransson; (penalty missed) Berglund; (penalty missed) Moberg

==== 2015 FIFA Women's World Cup qualification (UEFA) ====
===== Group 5 =====
25 September 2013	Norway	4–1	Belgium	Ullevaal Stadion, Oslo
18:00 (UTC+02:00)	Hansen 5'; Hegland 35', 54', 66'	Report	de Gernier 62'	Attendance: 4,233; Referee: Silvia Spinelli (Italy)

26 October 2013	Norway	7–0	Albania	Sarpsborg Stadion, Sarpsborg
18:00 (UTC+01:00)	Christensen 12'; Thorsnes 29'; Mjelde 45+2'; Hansen 51', 70', 73'; Gulbrandsen 62'	Report		Attendance: 1,528; Referee: Riem Hussein (Germany)

30 October 2013	Netherlands	1–2	Norway	Kras Stadion, Volendam
19:00 (UTC+01:00)	Miedema 23'	Report	Hansen 18'; Stensland 37'	Attendance: 3,500; Referee: Gyöngyi Gaál (Hungary)

== Managerial changes ==
Name	Club	Date of departure	Replacement	Date of appointment
(Norway) Martin Andresen	Vålerenga	18 Novemberember 2012	(Norway) Kjetil Rekdal	8 January 2013
(Norway) Kjetil Rekdal	Aalesund	26 November 2012	(Sweden) Jan Jönsson	8 January 2013
(Sweden) Jan Jönsson	Rosenborg	7 December 2012	(Norway) Per Joar Hansen	1 January 2013
(Norway) Per Mathias Høgmo	Tromsø	31 December 2012	(Norway) Agnar Christensen	1 January 2013
(Norway) Aasmund Bjørkan	Ranheim	31 December 2012	(Norway) Trond Nordsteien	1 January 2013
(Norway) Cato Hansen	Bodø/Glimt	31 December 2012	(Norway) Jan Halvor Halvorsen	1 January 2013
(Norway) Tom Nordlie	Kongsvinger	31 December 2012	(Norway) Stian Aasen	
(Norway) Arne Erlandsen	Ullensaker/Kisa	31 December 2012	(Norway) Roar Johansen	1 January 2013
(Norway) Roar Johansen	Sarpsborg 08	31 December 2012	(England) Brian Deane	1 January 2013
(Norway) Tor Thodesen	Moss	31 December 2012	(Denmark) Michael Frank	1 January 2013
	Tønsberg	31 December 2012	(Norway) Tor Thodesen	1 January 2013
(Norway) Agnar Christensen	Tromsø	1 October 2013	(Norway) Steinar Nilsen	1 October 2013
(Norway) Rune Skarsfjord	Brann	6 November 2013	(Norway) Kenneth Mikkelsen (interim)	6 November 2013
