= 2013 Algarve Cup =

International women's football tournament

Tournament details
- Host country: Portugal
- City: Algarve
- Dates: 6–13 March
- Teams: 12 (from 4 confederations)
- Venue(s): 7 (in 7 host cities)

Final positions
- Champions: United States (9th title)
- Runners-up: Germany
- Third place: Norway
- Fourth place: Sweden

Tournament statistics
- Matches played: 24
- Goals scored: 57 (2.38 per match)
- Top scorer(s): (Sweden) Kosovare Asllani (United States) Alex Morgan (3 goals)
- Best player(s): (United States) Megan Rapinoe

The 2013 Algarve Cup was the twentieth edition of the Algarve Cup, an annual invitational women's football tournament hosted by the Portuguese Football Federation (FPF).

== Teams ==
The following teams were taking part. There were no debutantes, as all teams played in previous editions.

Team	FIFA Rankings (December 2012)
United States	1
Germany	2
Japan	3
Sweden	6
Norway	12
Denmark	13
Iceland	15
China	17
Mexico	24
Hungary	37
Wales	39
Portugal (hosts)	46

== Format ==
The twelve invited teams were divided into three groups, and played in a round-robin tournament format within each group.

Groups A and B contained the strongest ranked teams, and were the only ones in contention to win the title. The group A and B winners contested the final – to win the Algarve Cup. The runners-up played for third place, and those that finish the group third played for fifth place.

The teams in Group C played for places 7–12. The winner of Group C played the team that finished fourth in Group A or B (whichever has the better record) for seventh place. The Group C runner-up played the team who finishes last in Group A or B (with the worse record) for ninth place. The third and fourth-placed teams in Group C played for the eleventh place.

Points awarded follow the standard soccer formula of three points for a win, one point for a draw, and no points for a loss. If two teams were tied with the same number of points in a group, their head-to-head result determined the final standings.

== Broadcasting ==
- Eurosport
- Eurosport 2
- Fox Soccer (USA)
- Integrated Sports (USA)
- RTP2 (Portugal)

== Group stage ==
All times are local (WET/UTC+0).

=== Group A ===
Team	Pld	W	D	L	GF	GA	GD	Pts
Germany	3	2	1	0	4	1	+3	7
Norway	3	1	1	1	2	2	0	4
Japan	3	1	0	2	3	4	−1	3
Denmark	3	0	2	1	0	2	−2	2

6 March 2013
13:10

Norway	2–0	Japan
Hansen 8'; Hegerberg 16'	Report

Stadium Bela Vista, Parchal
Attendance: 500
Referee: Carol Anne Chenard (Canada)
6 March 2013
17:00

Denmark	0–0	Germany
	Report

Municipal Stadium, Albufeira
Attendance: 500
Referee: Efthalia Mitsi (Greece)

8 March 2013
12:15

Germany	2–1	Japan
Faißt 7'; Marozsán 55'	Report	Tanaka 18'

Stadium Bela Vista, Parchal
Attendance: 500
Referee: Margaret Domka (United States)
8 March 2013
16:00

Norway	0–0	Denmark
	Report

Stadium Bela Vista, Parchal
Attendance: 348
Referee: Katalin Kulcsár (Hungary)

11 March 2013
12:20

Denmark	0–2	Japan
	Report	Kawasumi 17'; Ōgimi 41'

Estádio Algarve, Algarve
Attendance: 83
Referee: Quetzalli Alvarado (Mexico)
11 March 2013
12:20

Germany	2–0	Norway
Okoyino da Mbabi 52'; Keßler 86'	Report

Municipal Stadium, Lagos
Attendance: 500
Referee: Salomé di Iorio (Argentina)

=== Group B ===
Team	Pld	W	D	L	GF	GA	GD	Pts
United States	3	2	1	0	9	1	+8	7
Sweden	3	1	2	0	8	3	+5	5
China	3	1	1	1	2	6	−4	4
Iceland	3	0	0	3	1	10	−9	0

6 March 2013
14:00

United States	3–0	Iceland
Buehler 48'; Boxx 62'; Wambach 75'	Report

Municipal Stadium, Albufeira
Attendance: 500
Referee: Fusako Kajiyama (Japan)
6 March 2013
16:00

Sweden	1–1	China
Thunebro 59'	Report	Ren Guixin 32'

Stadium Bela Vista, Parchal
Attendance: 150
Referee: Quetzalli Alvarado (Mexico)

8 March 2013
14:00

United States	5–0	China
Leroux 13'; Krieger 33'; Rapinoe 46'; Press 64'; Engen 83'	Report

Municipal Stadium, Albufeira
Attendance: 500
Referee: Jana Adámková (Czech Republic)
8 March 2013
18:00

Sweden	6–1	Iceland
Asllani 10', 47'; Thunebro 14'; Schelin 42'; Hammarström 45'; Moberg 64'	Report	Magnúsdóttir 86'

Municipal Stadium, Albufeira
Attendance: 200
Referee: Salomé di Iorio (Argentina)

11 March 2013
15:00

China	1–0	Iceland
Zeng Ying 63'	Report

Sports Complex Nora, Ferreiras
Referee: Esther Azzopardi (Malta)
11 March 2013
15:00

Sweden	1–1	United States
Dahlkvist 4'	Report	Morgan 56'

Municipal Stadium, Lagos
Attendance: 750
Referee: Esther Staubli (Switzerland)

=== Group C ===
Team	Pld	W	D	L	GF	GA	GD	Pts
Mexico	3	2	0	1	4	1	+3	6
Hungary	3	1	1	1	3	2	+1	4
Wales	3	1	1	1	2	3	−1	4
Portugal	3	1	0	2	2	5	−3	3

6 March 2013
15:00

Mexico	1–0	Hungary
Cuéllar 48'	Report

Sports Complex Nora, Ferreiras
Referee: Esther Staubli (Switzerland)
6 March 2013
15:30

Portugal	2–0	Wales
Fernandes 36' (pen.), 74'	Report

Municipal Stadium, António
Referee: Teodora Albon (Romania)

8 March 2013
15:00

Portugal	0–2	Hungary
	Report	Vágó 27', 90+1' (pen.)

Municipal Stadium, António
Referee: Pernilla Larsson (Sweden)
8 March 2013
18:00

Wales	1–0	Mexico
Fishlock 11'	Report

Municipal Stadium, António
Referee: Liang Qin (China)

11 March 2013
15:30

Wales	1–1	Hungary
Ward 5'	Report	Csiszár 76'

Municipal Stadium, Quarteira
Referee: Therese Sagno (Guinea)
11 March 2013
15:30

Portugal	0–3	Mexico
	Report	Rangel 17'; Garza 42' (pen.); Cuéllar 61'

Estádio Algarve, Algarve
Referee: Margaret Domka (United States)

== Placement play-offs ==
=== Eleventh place match ===
13 March 2013
15:30

Wales	1–1	Portugal
Fishlock 77'	Report	Luís 90+3'
Penalties
	1–3

Stadium Bela Vista, Parchal
Referee: Katalin Kulcsár (Hungary)

=== Ninth place match ===
13 March 2013
12:00

Hungary	1–4	Iceland
Pádár 89' (pen.)	Report	Gunnarsdóttir 11'; Hönnudóttir 54'; Ómarsdóttir 81'; Jessen 90+3'

Stadium Bela Vista, Parchal
Referee: Liang Qin (China)

=== Seventh place match ===
13 March 2013
15:30

Mexico	0–3	Denmark
	Report	Hoveson 45'; Harder 67'; Bukh 90+2'

Municipal Stadium, Lagos
Attendance: 56
Referee: Jana Adámková (Czech Republic)

=== Fifth place match ===
13 March 2013
13:10

Japan	1–0	China
Ōgimi 67'	Report

Estádio Algarve, Algarve
Referee: Pernilla Larsson (Sweden)

=== Third place match ===
13 March 2013
12:00

Norway	2–2	Sweden
Hegland 39'; Hegerberg 90+1'	Report	Asllani 15'; Göransson 46'
Penalties
Christensen (penalty scored); Bjånesøy (penalty missed); Isaksen (penalty scored); Stensland (penalty scored); Gulbrandsen (penalty scored); Kaurin (penalty scored)	5–4	(penalty scored) Hammarström; (penalty scored) Thunebro; (penalty scored) Holmberg; (penalty scored) Göransson; (penalty missed) Berglund; (penalty missed) Moberg

Municipal Stadium, Lagos
Attendance: 200
Referee: Efthalia Mitsi (Greece)

=== Final ===
13 March 2013
17:00

Germany	0–2	United States
	Report	Morgan 13', 34'

Estádio Algarve, Algarve
Attendance: 1,000
Referee: Carol Anne Chenard (Canada)

== Goalscorers ==
3 goals

- (Sweden) Kosovare Asllani
- (United States) Alex Morgan

2 goals

- (Hungary) Fanny Vágó
- (Japan) Yūki Ōgimi
- (Mexico) Renae Cuéllar
- (Norway) Ada Hegerberg
- (Portugal) Edite Fernandes
- (Sweden) Sara Thunebro
- (Wales) Jessica Fishlock

1 goal

- (China) Ren Guixin
- (China) Zeng Ying
- (Denmark) Julie Rydahl Bukh
- (Denmark) Pernille Harder
- (Denmark) Sine Hovesen
- (Germany) Verena Faißt
- (Germany) Nadine Keßler
- (Germany) Dzsenifer Marozsán
- (Germany) Célia Okoyino da Mbabi
- (Hungary) Henrietta Csiszár
- (Hungary) Anita Pádár
- (Iceland) Sara Björk Gunnarsdóttir
- (Iceland) Rakel Hönnudóttir
- (Iceland) Sandra María Jessen
- (Iceland) Hólmfríður Magnúsdóttir
- (Iceland) Katrín Ómarsdóttir
- (Japan) Nahomi Kawasumi
- (Japan) Mina Tanaka
- (Mexico) Dinora Garza
- (Mexico) Nayeli Rangel
- (Norway) Caroline Graham Hansen
- (Norway) Kristine Wigdahl Hegland
- (Portugal) Laura Luís
- (Sweden) Lisa Dahlkvist
- (Sweden) Antonia Göransson
- (Sweden) Marie Hammarström
- (Sweden) Susanne Moberg
- (Sweden) Lotta Schelin
- (United States) Shannon Boxx
- (United States) Rachel Buehler
- (United States) Whitney Engen
- (United States) Ali Krieger
- (United States) Christen Press
- (United States) Megan Rapinoe
- (United States) Sydney Leroux
- (United States) Abby Wambach
- (Wales) Helen Ward

== Final standings ==
Rank	Team
1st place, gold medalist(s)	United States
2nd place, silver medalist(s)	Germany
3rd place, bronze medalist(s)	Norway
4	Sweden
5	Japan
6	China
7	Denmark
8	Mexico
9	Iceland
10	Hungary
11	Portugal
12	Wales

2013 Algarve Cup

United States
Ninth title
