= Guo Yue =

Guo Yue may refer to:

- Guo Yue (musician) (born 1958), Chinese musician, virtuoso of dizi and bawu
- Guo Yue (footballer) (born 1985), Chinese footballer
- Guo Yue (table tennis) (born 1988), Chinese table tennis player

== See also ==
- Yue (state) (Chinese: 越國; pinyin: Yuè Guó), a state in ancient China
