= Wigura =

Wigura is a Polish surname. Notable people with the surname include:

- Karolina Wigura (born 1980), Polish sociologist and journalist
- Stanisław Wigura (1901–1932), Polish aircraft designer and aviator
