= Swedish National Debt Office =

- Riksgäldskontoret
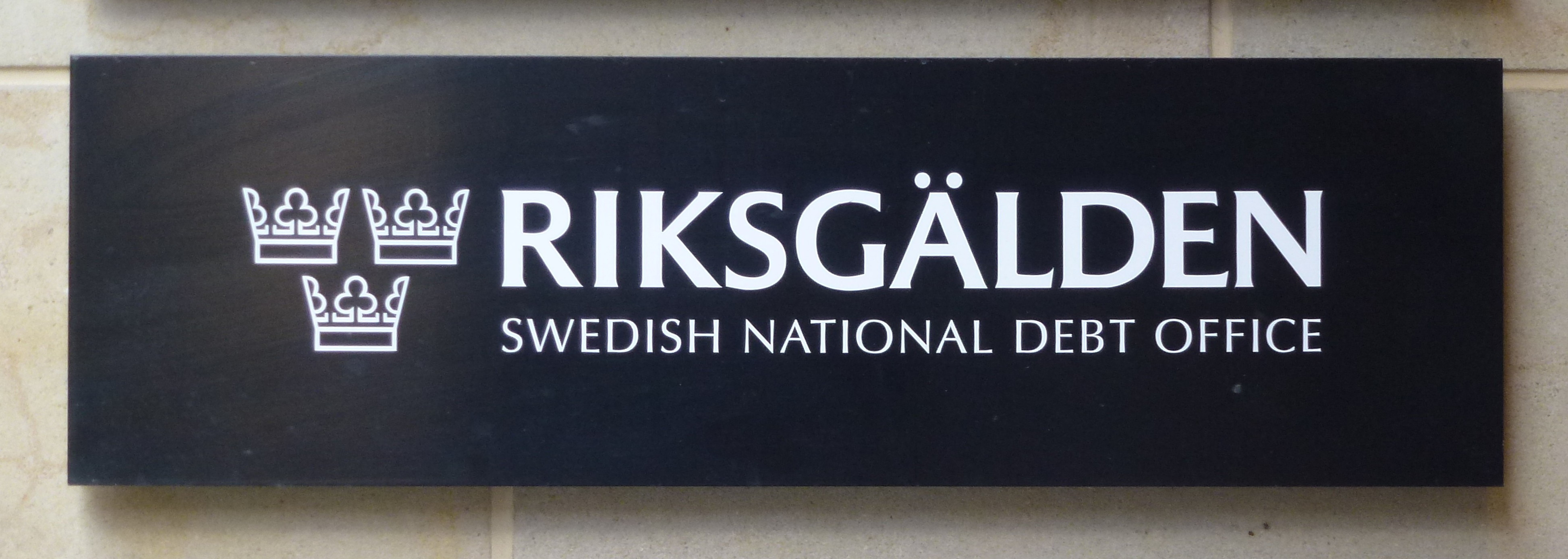

Agency overview
- Formed: 1789 as part of the Union and Security Act
- Preceding agency: Riksens ständers kontor
- Headquarters: Stockholm
- Employees: 224 (2023)
- Minister responsible: Elisabeth Svantesson as Minister for Finance
- Agency executive: Karolina Ekholm, riksgäldsdirektör
- Parent department: Finansdepartementet
- Website: https://www.riksgalden.se

The Swedish National Debt Office (Swedish: Riksgäldskontoret or shortly Riksgälden) is a Swedish Government agency founded in 1789 by Gustav III. Originally tasked with financing the ongoing war against Russia.Today the main task of the agency is to oversee the national debt, issue government guarantees and loans and finance the disposal of nuclear waste.

== History ==
Riksgäldskontoret has its origins in Riksens ständers kontor founded in 1719 to pay off debts from Karl XII time in office. It was controlled from the start by three fullmaktige later expanded to six, a fullmäktige was the person who sat on the board of Riksens ständers kontor. Riksens ständers kontor was abolished in 1765 and its tasks were transferred to Statskontoret. Just 12 years later in 1777 the king appointed the control over the national debt to a special riksgäldsdirektion, and in 1789 Riksgäldskontoret was founded as part of the Union and Security act after Gustav III convinced the Riksdag it would finance the war against Russia.

The method of raising funds was to issue promissory notes called Riksgälds denominated in Riksdaler which was the Swedish currency at the time. The reason why the funds could not be raised through the Riksbank was that its notes had to be backed by silver (commodity money) to two thirds, whereas no such restrictions applied for the promissory notes (credit money) issued by the Debt office. This produced a heavy seigniorage-induced inflation, where the exchange rate for the promissory notes against silver was 1 to 4 in 1834.

In 1989, after two hundred years as one of the few state agencies that reported directly to the Riksdag, the Debt office was reconstituted and is now reporting to the Ministry of Finance and the Government. After 1989 it also assumed the role as the government's internal bank from the Riksbank.

Since January 1, 2008 the Debt office handles the Swedish deposit insurance, which 1996-2007 was handled by a separate governmental agency.

== Directors-general ==
- 1945-1950 - Fredrik Emanuel Sandberg
- 1950-1961 - Sten Widlund
- 1961-1977 - Karl Georg Ringström
- 1977-1987 - Lars Kalderén
- 1988-1995 - Staffan Crona
- 1995-2004 - Thomas Franzén
- 2004-2013 - Bo Lundgren
- 2013–2022 - Hans Lindblad
- 2022– - Karolina Ekholm

== See also ==
- Scandinavian Monetary Union
- Krona
- Economy of Sweden
- Monetary policy of Sweden
- List of financial supervisory authorities by country
