= Karoliina =

- Gender: Female

Origin
- Origin: Germanic
- Meaning: Free man

Other names
- Variant form: Karolina
- Related names: Caroline, Carol

Karoliina is a Finnish and Estonian feminine given name derived from Charles. People with the name include:

- Karoliina Blackburn (born 1972), Finnish actress and Muay Thai boxer
- Karoliina Kallio (born 1979), Finnish singer and actor
- Karoliina Lundahl (born 1968), Finnish weightlifter
- Karoliina Rantamäki (born 1978), Finnish female ice hockey player

== See also ==
- Karolina (given name)
