= Karolina Halatek =

Polish contemporary visual artist

- Education: University of the Arts London; Wimbledon College of Arts (BA); Universität der Künste Berlin (MA); Academy of Fine Arts in Warsaw
- Occupation: contemporary visual artist
- Notable work: Terminal (NDE artwork).
- Website: https://karolinahalatek.com/

Karolina Halatek is a Polish contemporary visual artist working in a field of installation art, using light as a key medium. Karolina Halatek creates experiential site-specific spaces that incorporate visual, architectural and sculptural elements. Seeing her work primarily as a catalyst for experience, Karolina creates installations that have strong experiential and immersive characteristics, often the result of collaborations with quantum physicists, founders of the superstring theory (Leonard Susskind, Roger Penrose, Carlo Rovelii) and precision mechanical engineers.

== Career ==
Halatek studied Design for Performance at the University of the Arts London, Wimbledon College of Art, Great Britain, Fine Arts at the Universität der Künste Berlin, Germany and Media Art at the Academy of Fine Arts in Warsaw, Poland. During studies in Berlin, she participated in workshops at the Institut für Raumexperimente run by Olafur Eliasson. She completed an internship at the Lighting Lab at the Royal Danish Academy in Copenhagen, concurrently with her PhD studies at Doctoral School of Jan Matejko Academy of Fine Arts in Kraków.

Karolina Halatek received the Minister's Scholarship for Fine Arts from the Minister of Culture and National Heritage in Poland, a London residency managed by Acme Studios International Residencies Programme in collaboration with Adam Mickiewicz Institute in Warsaw in 2014, artist residency at CEC Artslink NYC and Laumeier Sculpture Park, St. Louis, Missouri; residency at a$ Art Museum in Chengdu, China. Karolina Halatek was a fellow through the »New Networks« project, a cooperation of Akademie Schloss Solitude and the Center for Contemporary Art Ujazdowski Castle in Warsaw, with financial support by the Adam Mickiewicz Institute in Warsaw. In cooperation with KulturRegion Stuttgart and the city of Gerlingen, Karolina Halatek participated in the Lichkunstfestival »Aufstiege« of KulturRegion Stuttgart during her stay at Akademie Schloss Solitude. In 2015 her Scanner Room Video was broadcast into outer space at the MONA FOMA Festival held by the Museum of Old and New Art in Hobart, Tasmania. In 2021 her installation Beacon commissioned by Noor Riyadh Festival in Saudi Arabia broke a World Guinness Record in category of the Largest LED Structure.

== Near death experience in contemporary art ==
Halatek dedicated her project Terminal to the subject of near-death experience. The immersive light installation was inspired by the testimonies of people who returned from unconsciousness, reported their experiences at the threshold of death. Installation has been exhibited multiple times in Gerlingen/Stuttgart and in front of Kunsthalle Bremen, Germany. In 2018 project has been presented at the 4th International Time Perspective Conference, University of Nantes, France. In 2024 Terminal has been selected as one of the eight winning by the international jury for the competition "Art in Public Spaces" launched and finansed by the Ministry of Economy, Culture and Innovation of Albania. The permanent installationTerminal in Tirana has been placed in front of University Medical Center of Tirana "Mother Teresa", curated by Adela Demetja and implemented by Tirana Art Lab - Center for Contemporary Art. In 2026 Terminal for Tirana, became a winner of BIG SEE Architecture Award in public / open space and landscape category.

Major exhibitions

- Germany: Kunsthalle Bremen, Aufstiege Lichtkunstfestival by KulturRegion Stuttgart, Akademie Schloss Solitude, Kunstkraftwerk Leipzig, Design Transfer Gallery Berlin, Universität der Künste Berlin
- Laumeier Sculpture Park, St. Louis, USA
- Kinetica Art Fair, London, Great Britain
- Transmission Festival, Omonoia Athens Biennial, Greece
- Edinburgh Fringe Festival, Scotland
- Dubai ECHO Festival of Art, Design and Technology, United Arab Emirates
- A4 Art Museum, Chengdu, China
- Morcote Public Art Biennial, Galleria Daniele Agostini, Lugano, Switzerland
- De School during Amsterdam Dance Event, curated by Children of the Light, Netherlands
- 4th International Time Perspective Conference at University of Nantes, France
- Poland: Centre for Contemporary Art Ujazdowski Castle in Warsaw, Centre for Contemporary Art Elektrownia in Radom, Galeria Labirynt in Lublin, Museum of Lublin, BWA Galleries of Contemporary Art Wrocław, Museum of Archeology and Ethnography in Łódź, Lodz Design, Manhattan Gallery in Łódź, Galeria Opus in Łódź, Fotofestiwal International Festival of Photography in Łódź, Otwarta Pracownia, Kraków, Salon Akademii Gallery in Warsaw, Propaganda Gallery at Warsaw Gallery Weekend.

== Public presentations and artist talks ==
- Artslink Assembly, Columbia University School of the Arts, 2018
- Laumeier Sculpture Park, St.Louis, USA, 2018
- Webster University, Department of Art, Design & Art History, St.Louis, USA, 2018
- 4th International Time Perspective Conference, University of Nantes, France, 2018
- Kunsthalle Bremen, Long Night of the Museums, 2018
- Light as a Creative Tool Conference, Academy of Fine Arts in Gdańsk, Poland, 2018
- Kunstkrafwerk Leipzig, Germany, 2017
- ÜberLicht, Art in Public Spaces, Esslingen, during Ascents Light Art Festival, Germany, 2016
- Gerlingen City Council, Germany, 2016
- Near Death Experience Conference, Gerlingen, Germany, 2016
- Symposium on Abstract Geometry, Radziejowice, Poland, 2015
- The Educational Film Studio (WFO) Łódź, Poland, 2013
- Academy of Fine Arts Łódź, Poland, 2013

== Press ==
- Terminal Artdaily, Designboom, iGnant, Archdaily, Culture.pl, Welt, Jurnal du Design, Illumni, Urdesign, Skai, Goood
- Scanner Room Artdaily, Creators Project, FAD Magazine, Pylon Hub, Illumni, Starry Night
- Cloud Square FAD Magazine, Designboom, Illumni

== Bibliography ==
- Forma i Nieprzedstawialne - Radziejowice 2015 ISBN 978-83-62140-61-9
- Sztuka a wartości Ponadczasowe - Radziejowice 2016 ISBN 978-83-62140-89-3
- Światło w geomertii - Radziejowice 2017, ISBN 978-83-62140-10-7
- Mere Formality, Galeria Labirynt, ISBN 978-83-64588-28-0
- Pankiewicz i Po... Uwalnianie koloru, Muzeum Lubelskie ISBN 978-83-61073-10-9
- Change, Łódź Art Center, Poland ISBN 978-83-61332-20-6
- Czarny Neseser, BWA Wrocław Galleries of Contemporary Art ISBN 978-83-89308-98-6
- ABS, Salon Akademii Gallery, Academy of Fine Arts in Warsaw ISBN 978-83-65455-37-6
- Dairy 2017, Centre for Contemporary Art Ujazdowski Castle, Warsaw ISBN 978-83-65240-29-3
