= Nadezhda Myskiv =

Russian footballer (born 1988)

Personal information
- Full name: Nadezhda Myskiv
- Date of birth: 11 April 1988 (age 38)
- Place of birth: Soviet Union
- Position: Midfielder

Senior career*
Years	Team	Apps	(Gls)
2008–2009	WFC Rossiyanka		
2010–2013	Zorky Krasnogorsk		

International career
2009–2011	Russia		
- * Club domestic league appearances and goals

Nadezhda Myskiv is a former Russian football defender, who played for Zorky Krasnogorsk in the Russian Championship.

She was included in the Russia national team for the 2009 European Championship replacing Maria Dyachkova.
