= Marianne Pedersen =

Danish footballer (born 1985)

Personal information
- Date of birth: 28 February 1985 (age 41)
- Position: Defender

Senior career*
Years	Team	Apps	(Gls)
- IK Skovbakken

International career
- Denmark
- * Club domestic league appearances and goals

Marianne Pedersen (born 28 February 1985) is a Danish women's international footballer who plays as a defender. She is a member of the Denmark women's national football team. She was part of the team at the UEFA Women's Euro 2009. On club level she plays for IK Skovbakken in Denmark.
