= Karolina Bochra =

Polish footballer (born 1988)

Personal information
- Date of birth: 31 August 1988 (age 38)
- Place of birth: Poland
- Position: Striker

Senior career*
Years	Team	Apps	(Gls)
2003–2006	Gol Częstochowa		(6)
2006–2010	AZS Wrocław		(28)
2010–2012	AZS AWF Katowice		(5)
2012–2015	Zagłębie Lubin		
2015–2017	Arminia Bielefeld		

International career
2007–2017	Poland	7	(1)
- * Club domestic league appearances and goals

Karolina Bochra (born 31 August 1988) is a Polish former professional footballer who played as a striker.

She was a member of the Poland national team in the 2008 Algarve Cup, where she scored against hosts Portugal.

In 2010, Bochra transferred to 1. FC Katowice, and was part of the squad that achieved promotion to the Ekstraliga the next season. Later she played for Zagłębie Lubin.

In September 2015, Bochra joined the regional league team Arminia Bielefeld, following the recommendation of her former teammate from her time in Częstochowa, Kamila Kmiecik. Scoring 16 goals in the season, she played a key role in Bielefeld's championship victory and their promotion to the 2. Frauen-Bundesliga. Having successfully remained in the league, she retired in the summer of 2017.

== Career statistics ==
=== International ===
Appearances and goals by national team and year
National team	Year	Apps	Goals
Poland	2007	1	0
Poland	2008	4	1
Poland	2008	2	0
Total		7	1

Scores and results list Poland's goal tally first, score column indicates score after each Bochra goal.

List of international goals scored by Karolina Bochra
No.	Date	Venue	Opponent	Score	Result	Competition
1	7 March 2008	Estádio Algarve, Faro, Portugal	Portugal	1–1	1–3	2008 Algarve Cup

== Honours ==
AZS Wrocław

- Ekstraliga: 2005–06, 2006–07, 2007–08
- Polish Cup: 2006–07, 2008–09

Individual

- Polish Cup top scorer: 2006–07
