= Karolina Jus =

Polish-Canadian neurologist (1914–2002)

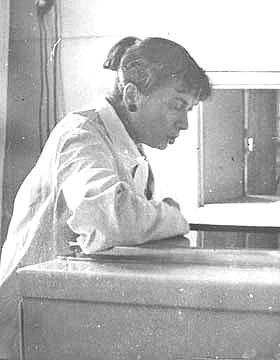
- Jus at the Medical Academy in Warsaw
- Born: Karolina Frist; 31 December 1914; Vienna
- Died: 22 November 2002 (aged 87); Toronto
- Burial place: Cemetery at the Hospital for the Nervous and Mentally Ill, Tworki, Poland
- Education: Jagiellonian University; University of Warsaw
- Occupation: Neurologist
- Known for: Electroencephalographic research
- Spouse: Andrzej Jus

Karolina Frist Jus, (31 December 1914 – 22 November 2002) was a Polish-Canadian neurologist of Jewish origin; her parents and only sibling were killed in the Holocaust. She was a pioneer of electroencephalographic research and the effect of psychotropic drugs on sleep.

== Biography ==
Karolina Frist was born on 31 December 1914 in Vienna after her father, Dr. Juliusz Frist, sent his pregnant wife, Dorota Bannet, there when invading Russian troops threatened their hometown of Kraków, Poland. Her parents were part of an extended Jewish family from that city. She was the granddaughter of Henryk Frist (founder of the Salon of Polish Painters in Kraków). Karolina and her sister Zofia (born 1917) were raised in a family of Jewish faith, although they were assimilated and felt Polish.

In Kraków, Karolina passed her secondary school examination in 1932, and went on to study law at the Faculty of Law of the Jagiellonian University, graduating in 1936 with a Master of Law degree. She also studied at the London School of Economics. In 1937, she defended her doctoral thesis on the Statute of Westminster 1931. That same year, she began studying medicine at the Jagiellonian University Medical College in Kraków.

=== World War II ===
After the outbreak of World War II, she and her parents traveled by train to Lviv (now in Ukraine), which was under Soviet occupation at the end of 1939. She attended medical classes at the Lviv Medical Institute and was accepted into the third-year of studies there. When she attended a meeting about research on convulsive therapy in October 1940, she met Andrzej Karol Jus, a Catholic doctor from the Psychiatric Institution.

German troops attacked the Soviet Union on 22 June 1941, which was followed by the German invasion the following month, threatening those of Jewish descent. Karolina was immediately baptized into the Roman Catholic Church. She quickly married Andrzej Jus and changed her name to Karolina Jus, successfully concealing her Jewish identity. At the beginning of 1942, the couple left Lviv and settled in Dydnia, Poland. However, her remaining Jewish family members were not so lucky. In April 1942, her parents and sister were murdered by German Nazis and buried in a mass grave.

In Dydnia, Karolina helped her husband with his medical practice, and they remained in Poland until German troops arrived there in July 1944. By the beginning of 1945, the couple had settled in Warsaw's Praga district. They then moved to Wrocław, where the Wrocław Medical University was establishing a Faculty of Medicine. In 1946, Karolina completed her medical studies and earned her diploma. From then on, she worked as a resident at the Department of Neurology.

Because Karolina and Andrzej Jus did not have access to an electroencephalograph. Instead, they found a way to use an electrocardiograph with enhanced instrumentation and eventually obtained and published the first clinical electroencephalographic study, making them pioneers in the study of electrical brain activity. Karolina Jus worked in Wrocław from 1945 to 1949: from September 1945 to November 1947, she was employed in a neurological clinic, and then, until December 1949, in a psychiatric clinic. At the end of 1949, she and her husband joined the staff of the Psychoneurological Institute in Pruszków, where, beginning in 1950, she was the head of the electroencephalographic (EEG) laboratory. They organized a research and scientific laboratory focused on electroencephalography, clinical neurophysiology, and sleep research.

Karolina Jus defended her doctorate in medicine at the University of Warsaw in 1946. In 1953, they moved to the Medical Academy in Łódź, where Karolina became an associate professor in the Department of Neurology. In 1955, she became an associate professor at the University of Łódź and worked at the Neurological Clinic.

By 1955, Karolina and Andrzej Jus had moved back to Warsaw, where Karolina became an associate professor at the Department of Psychiatry at the Medical Academy. In 1956, she became head of the electroencephalography and clinical neurophysiology laboratory. In 1967, she received the title of associate professor. During their work in Poland, both researchers belonged to foreign scientific societies, maintained scientific contacts and participated in scientific meetings. In 1966, they were the first to perform a polysomnographic (sleep) examination. A year later, they published scientific papers on this subject. Their main interests concerned sleep by patients with mental disorders and the effect of psychotropic drugs on sleep. But the political atmosphere in Poland had become very anti-Semitic and threatened both Karolina and Andrzej personally and professionally.

=== Canada ===
In 1970, the couple emigrated from Poland to Canada, accepting an invitation to become visiting professors at McGill University in Montreal. In January 1971, they received the status of permanent residents in Canada. Subsequently, they both accepted an invitation from the University of Laval in Quebec, where they were named full professors and given the opportunity to continue research in the fields of electroencephalography, psychopharmacology and sleep research.

They both retired at the age of 65. Four years later, they moved to Toronto. They had no children.

In 1991, their memoir, Our Journey in the Valley of Tears, was published. In 1992, the book received the Joseph Tanenbaum Holocaust Book Award in Canada. Later, the Drs Andrzej and Karolina Jus Holocaust Literature Award was presented there in 1993 and 1994.

After her husband's death in 1992, Karolina bequeathed $250,000 to the University of Toronto. This bequest funded the annual Andrzej Jus Lecture at the Joint Centre for Bioethics, as well as Philip Seeman's research on the biochemistry and genetics of schizophrenia.

=== Final years ===
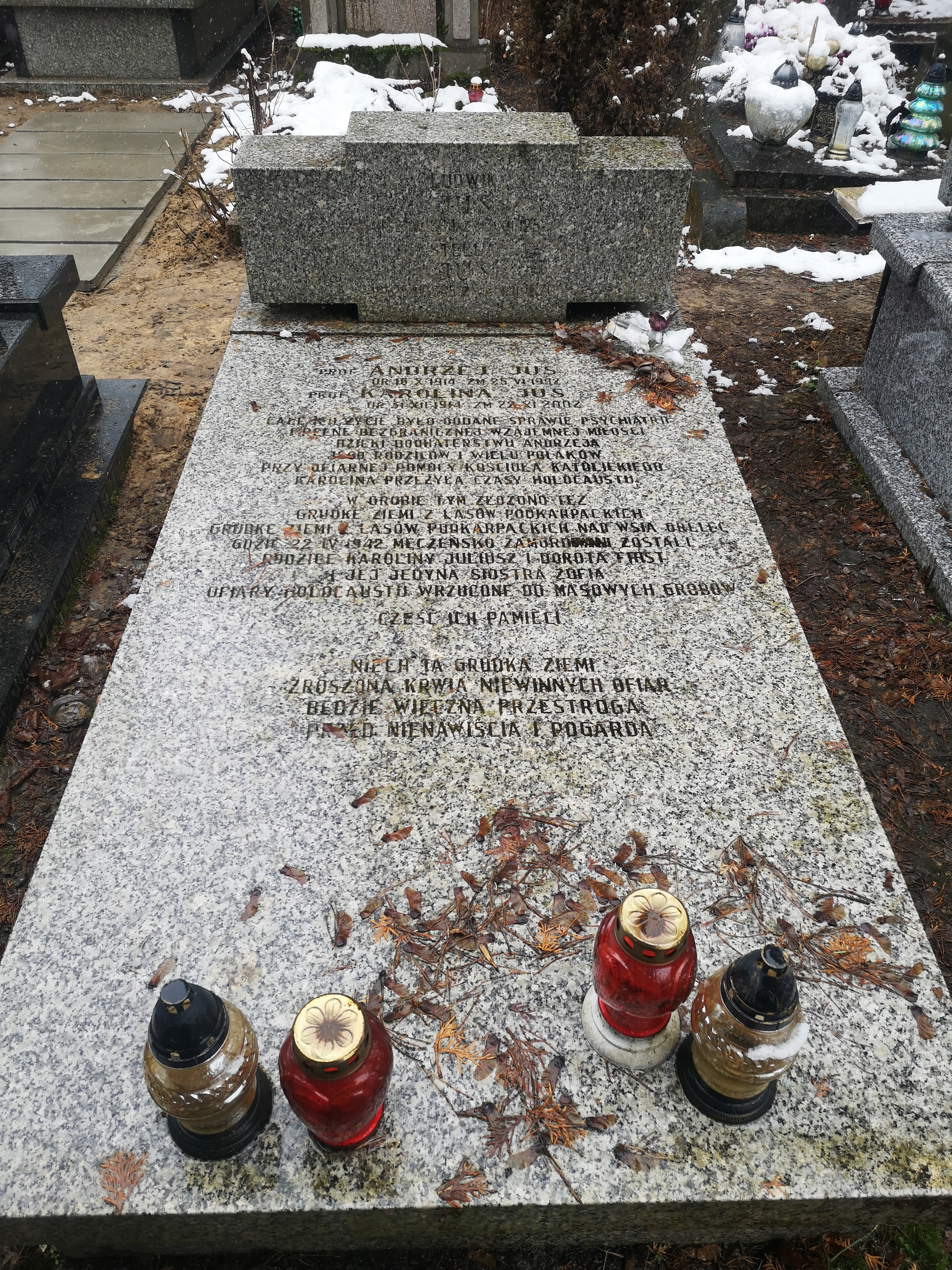
The grave of Karolina and Andrzej (and Andrej's parents) at a cemetery in Tworki, Poland.

They both died in Toronto: Andrzej in June 1992 and Karolina in November 2002. They were buried in Poland, with Andrzej's parents, at the cemetery for the Hospital for the Nervous and Mentally Ill in Tworki (Pruszków, Pruszków County, Masovian Voivodeship).

== Legacy ==
The Department of Pharmacology and Toxicology, Faculty of Medicine, University of Toronto, presents the Juliusz, Dorota and Zofia Frist Memorial Award in Neuropsychopharmacology to young researchers in this field. The department also gives the Annual Frist-Jus Memorial Award in Neuropsychopharmacology to graduates.

== Selected works ==
- The diagnostic value of single-lead electroencephalography in epilepsy (1949)
- Fighting the Idealistic Offensive in Electroencephalography (1953)
- Pavlov and His Teachings (1953, 1955)
- Electroencephalography (1954)
- Clinical electroencephalography (1967)
- Biological methods of treatment in psychiatry (1969)

== External sources ==
- Kujawski, Ryszard, In the Valley of Tears. Professor Andrzej Jus. Life and Scientific Achievements. A Contribution to the History of Polish and Canadian Psychiatry in the Second Half of the 20th Century, by Ryszard Kujawski, 2019.
- USC Shoah Foundation Institute testimony of Karolina Jus (interview)
