= Karolina Ekholm =

Swedish economist

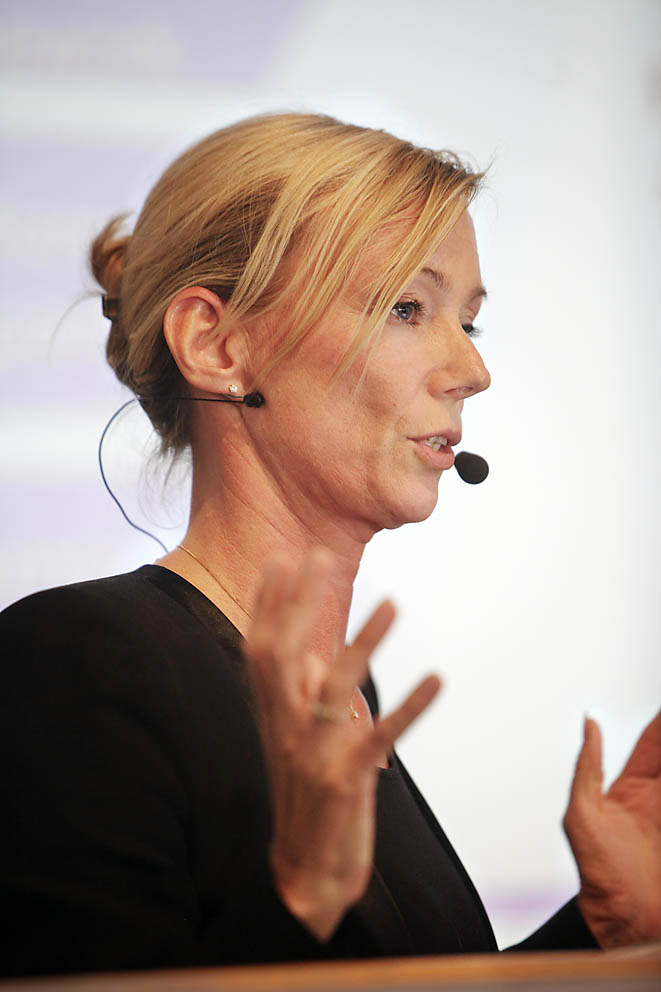

Karolina Ekholm (18 October 1964, Täby) is a Swedish economist and public official.

== Education and research ==
Ekholm, obtained a PhD in 1995 from the Department of Economics at Lund University. As a researcher she has focused mainly on the effects of globalisation. Since 1 April 2010 she is also Professor at Stockholm University.

== Career ==
Ekholm served as one of five deputy governors at the Sveriges Riksbank, Sweden's central bank, from 2009 to 2014. She left before her mandate had expired to take up her role as state secretary to Finance Minister Magdalena Andersson when the Social Democrats came to power in 2014.

In September 2017, Ekholm was rejected by the opposition when she was proposed for the post of governor of the Riksbank.

== Other activities ==
- Bruegel, Member of the Board
- International Monetary Fund (IMF), Ex-Officio Alternate Member of the Board of Governors

Government offices
| Preceded by Irma Rosenberg | Deputy Governor of Sveriges Riksbank; 2009–2014 | Succeeded by Henry Ohlsson |
| Preceded by Hans Lindblad | Director–General of the Swedish National Debt Office; 2022– | Succeeded by Incumbent |
