= Carina Holmberg =

Swedish footballer

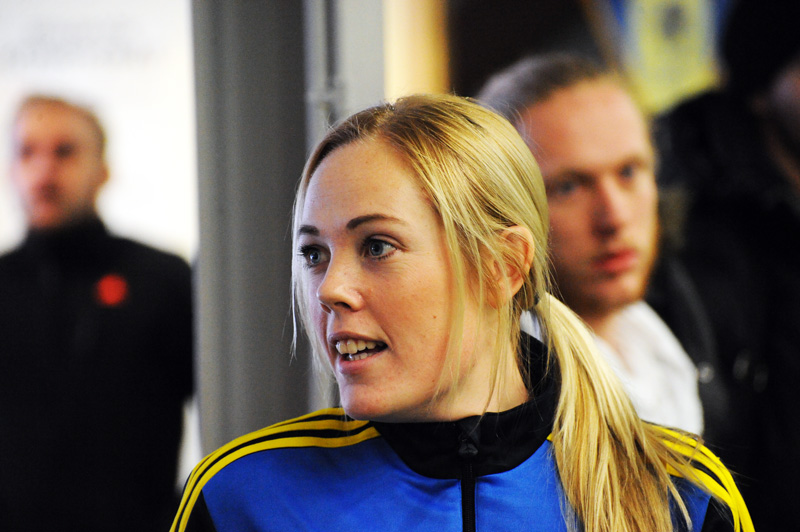

Personal information
- Full name: Carina Holmberg
- Date of birth: 4 October 1983 (age 43)
- Place of birth: Sweden
- Height: 1.69 m (5 ft 6 1/2 in)
- Position: Forward

Team information
- Current team: Sunnanå SK
- Number: 9

Youth career
- Storvreta IK
- 1998: Danmarks IF

Senior career*
Years	Team	Apps	(Gls)
1999–2004	Bälinge IF		
2005–2014	Sunnanå SK	128	(35)

International career^{‡}
2013–	Sweden	2	(0)
- * Club domestic league appearances and goals as of 4 July 2020 ‡ National team caps and goals as of 21:00, 12 December 2013 (UTC)

Carina Holmberg (born 4 October 1983) is a Swedish football player for Sunnanå SK in the Swedish Elitettan who is a forward. She has represented Sweden women's national football team at the senior international level.

She made her senior international debut in a 6–1 win over Iceland at the 2013 Algarve Cup on 8 March 2013. A succession of injuries caused Holmberg to drop out of national team contention before UEFA Women's Euro 2013.

Holmberg had joined Sunnanå SK from Bälinge IF ahead of the 2005 season.
