= Mia-Maria Kjærsgaard-Andersen =

Danish footballer (born 1989)

Personal information
- Date of birth: 19 January 1989 (age 37)
- Place of birth: Denmark
- Position: Goalkeeper

Senior career*
Years	Team	Apps	(Gls)
- IK Skovbakken
2007–2013	SønderjyskE Fodbold		

International career
- Denmark
- * Club domestic league appearances and goals

Mia-Maria Kjærsgaard-Andersen (born 19 January 1989) is a Danish retired football goalkeeper who played for IK Skovbakken, SønderjyskE Fodbold and the Danish national team.

== International career ==
Kjærsgaard-Andersen was also part of the Danish team at the 2009 European Championships.
