= Sine Hovesen =

Danish footballer (born 1987)

Personal information
- Full name: Sine Hovesen
- Date of birth: 19 August 1987 (age 39)
- Position: Midfielder

Youth career
- 1992–2001: Aulum IF
- 2001–2004: Mejrup GU

Senior career*
Years	Team	Apps	(Gls)
2004–2007	Vejle Boldklub		
2007–2015	Fortuna Hjørring		

International career
2004–2006	Denmark U-19	28	(6)
2008–	Denmark	12	(1)
- * Club domestic league appearances and goals

Sine Hovesen (born 19 August 1987) is a Danish former footballer who played as a midfielder.

== Club career ==
She played for Fortuna Hjørring since 2007.

== International career ==
Hovesen made her senior Denmark debut at the 2008 Algarve Cup, in a 1–0 win over Germany. She was called up to be part of the national team for the UEFA Women's Euro 2013.

== Honours ==
=== Club ===
Fortuna Hjørring

Winner

- Elitedivisionen: 2009–10

Runner-up

- Elitedivisionen: 2011–12, 2012–13
- Danish Women's Cup: 2012–13
