= Trond Nordsteien =

Norwegian football manager (born 1963)

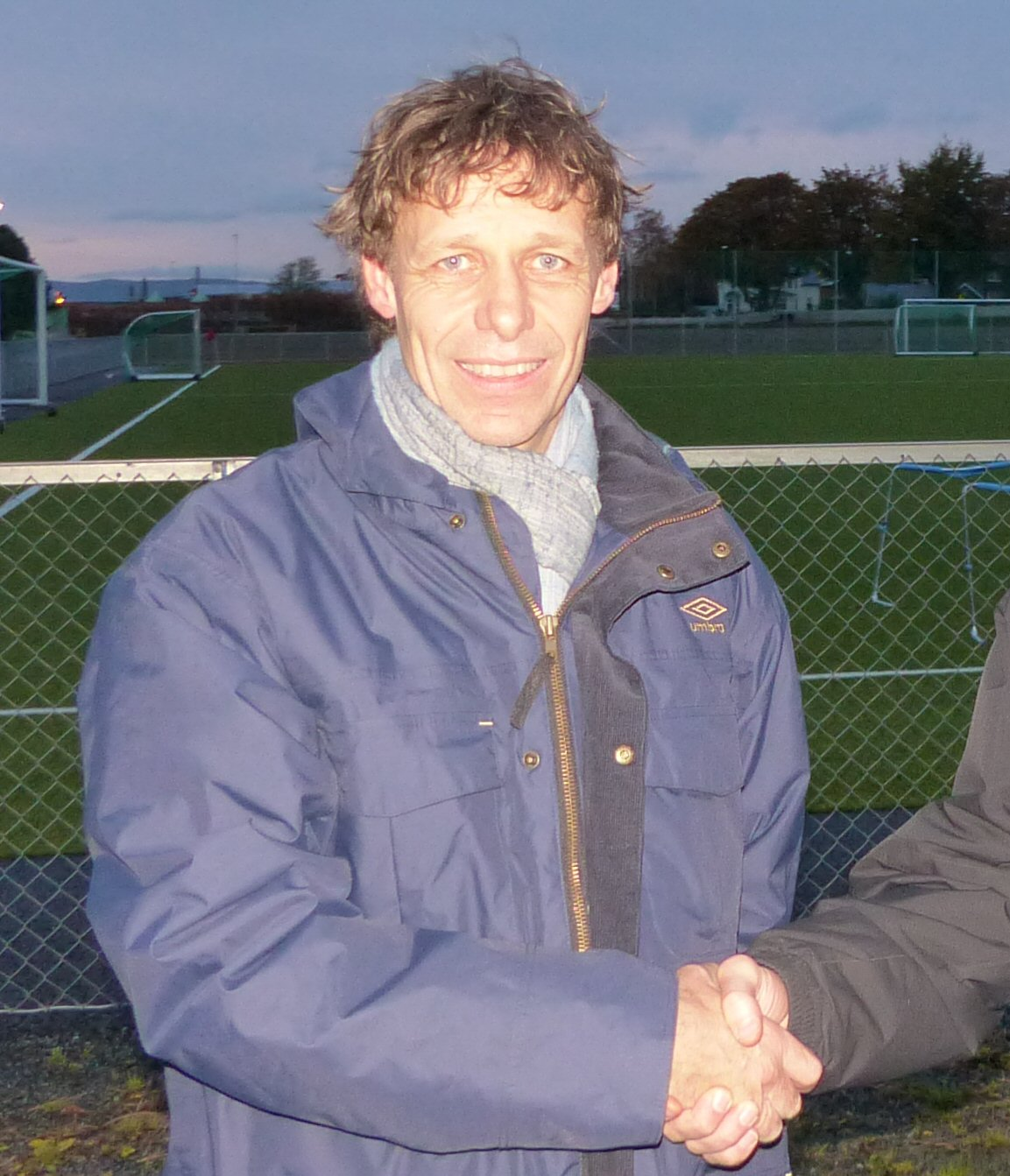
- Nordsteien in 2015

Personal information
- Date of birth: 24 November 1963 (age 62)
- Position: Midfielder

Youth career
- Løkken
- Rosenborg

Senior career*
Years	Team	Apps	(Gls)
- Freidig

Managerial career
- Othilienborg (youth)
- –1997: Nardo (U19)
- 1998: Kolstad
- 2000–2005: Trondheims-Ørn women
- 2002: Norway U21 women (assistant)
- 2003–2005: Norway women (assistant)
- 2006–2012: Rosenborg (player developer)
- 2011: Ranheim (assistant)
- 2012: Norway U19
- 2013: Norway U21 (caretaker)
- 2013–2015: Ranheim
- 2016: Trondheims-Ørn women
- 2017–2018: Tromsø (coach developer)
- * Club domestic league appearances and goals

Trond Nordsteien (born 24 November 1963) is a Norwegian football manager. Mainly known for his period as manager of SK Trondheims-Ørn, with whom he won several trophies, he also managed Ranheim and Norwegian youth international teams.

== Career ==
Nordsteien hails from Løkken Verk, moving to Trondheim at the age of 15. After playing on Rosenborg's junior team with teammates such as Trond Henriksen, he was deemed not good enough for Rosenborg's senior team. His senior career as a player was instead spent with lowly SK Freidig. Nordsteien studied to become a mathematics teacher, and coached a boys' team in Othilienborg, then the junior team of Nardo FK. After leading Nardo to the 1997 Norwegian Junior Cup final where they finished runners-up, Nordsteien took over Kolstad IL in 1998. In 1999 he took over the dominating women's team at the time, SK Trondheims-Ørn. With Trondheims-Ørn, Nordsteien won the Toppserien in 2000, 2001 and 2003; the cup in 2001 and 2002 and reached the 2004–05 UEFA Women's Cup semi-final.

In 2003 he was appointed as assistant manager of the Norway under-21 women's team, and a year later he advanced to assistant manager of Norway under Åge Steen. The newspaper VG revealed that Nordsteien could continue as Trondheims-Ørn manager and assist the national team part-time, due to Football Association enacting budget cuts for women's and youth teams because they bought Åge Hareide out of his Rosenborg contract to coach the men's national team.

Nonetheless, Nordsteien did not renew his contract with Trondheims-Ørn as it expired on 31 December 2005. He was hired as player developed in Rosenborg, succeeding Bjørn Hansen who retired. For Nordsteien, the new job entailed leaving the national team duty.

In 2011 he doubled as assistant manager of Ranheim, a club that Rosenborg cooperated with. Nordsteien then returned to the Football Association. In 2012 Nordsteien coached Norway U19, and became acting coach of Norway U21 in 2013.

He left Rosenborg after the 2012 season to become head coach in the Norwegian First Division, taking over Ranheim in 2013. He served until he was sacked in May 2015. In 2016 he returned to Trondheims-Ørn, but already in June he announced his intention to leave the club, and was replaced in September. During the closing days of the 2017 season, it was announced that Tromsø IL hired Nordsteien as a coach developer. He stayed in Tromsø throughout 2018 and was succeeded by Morten Giæver.
