= Karolina Lassbo =

Swedish blogger, internet personality and lawyer (born 1980)

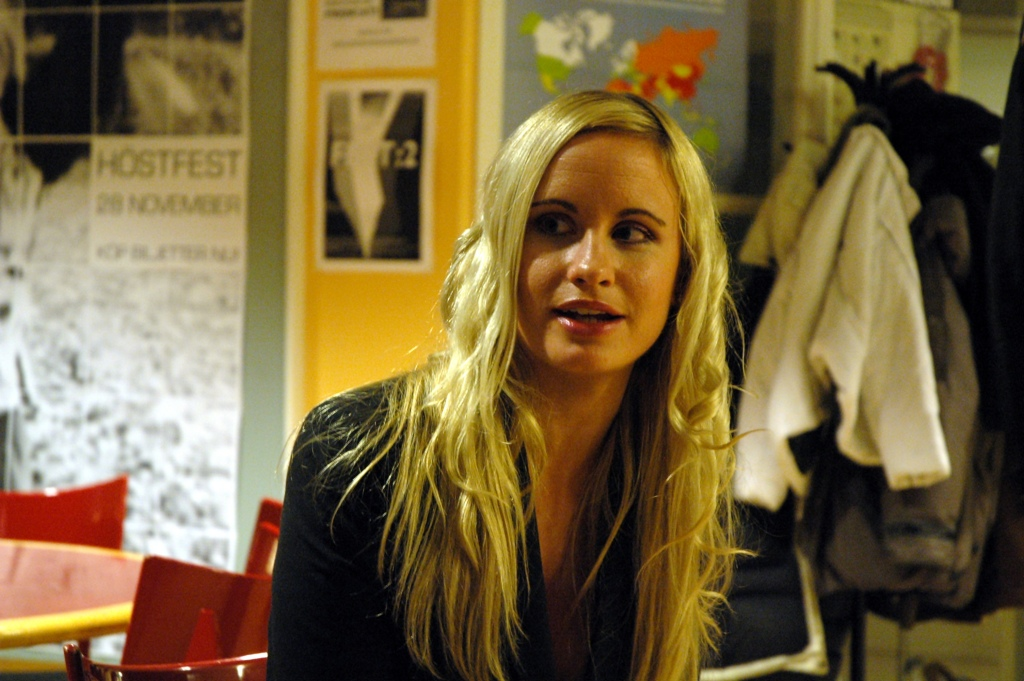
- Lassbo in 2005
- Born: 31 March 1980 (age 46)
- Occupations: Lawyer, blogger

Karolina Charlotte Lassbo (born 31 March 1980) is a Swedish blogger, internet personality and lawyer.

== Early life and education ==
Lassbo was born and grew up in Falun, Sweden. In 1999 she studied Psychology at Högskolan Dalarna in Borlänge, but in 2002 she moved to Uppsala and studied law at the Uppsala University. She earned her degree in 2007.

== Career ==
Lassbo became known for her blog En glamourprinsessas dagbok (A glamour princess diary) which she started in August 2006. She earned a living income by selling ads and banner space on her blog. She was awarded the prize "Årets Bloggare" (Blogger of the Year) in December 2006 by Computer Sweden. In late 2006 the publications Att:ention and Expressen named her one of the fifteen "media elite" people in Sweden. Veckans Affärer placed her 22nd on their list of Sweden's supertalents in early 2007.

Lassbo participated in the Nya Fröken Sverige (New Miss Sweden) beauty pageant in 2006. The eventual winner was actress Josephine Alhanko.

In 2007 she was commissioned to write a blog for the Metro paper. In late 2007 she started working for the law firm Advokatfirman Cederquist in Stockholm, and later at the Svenska Förläggareföreningen.

In late 2009 Lassbo became a contestant on the reality television dating show Dagens Man which was hosted by Carolina Gynning on TV4 Plus.
