= Guo Yue (footballer) =

Chinese association football player

Personal information
- Date of birth: 12 December 1985 (age 40)
- Place of birth: Changchun, China
- Position: Defender

International career
Years	Team	Apps	(Gls)
- China

Guo Yue (Chinese: 郭月; born December 12, 1985) is a Chinese professional association football player who plays as a defender in the Chinese Women's Super League. She is also a member of the Chinese women's national football team. Yue represented China in the 2006 AFC Women's Asian Cup.
