= Susanne Moberg =

Association football player (born 1986)

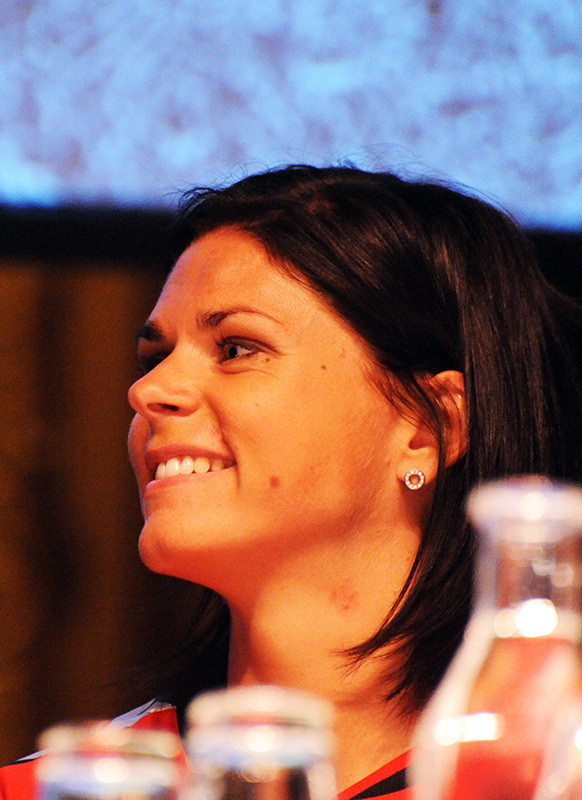

Personal information
- Full name: Anna Susanne Moberg
- Date of birth: 13 February 1986 (age 40)
- Place of birth: Spjutstorp, Sweden
- Height: 1.70 m (5 ft 7 in)
- Position: Forward

Youth career
- Onslunda IF
- Malmö FF

Senior career*
Years	Team	Apps	(Gls)
2003–2015	Kristianstads DFF (Note: Swedish Football Association source includes 2008 and subsequent seasons only. It does not include figures for the Damallsvenskan seasons between 2003 and 2007.)	169	(43)

International career^{‡}
2011–2013	Sweden	11	(1)
- * Club domestic league appearances and goals as of 11:23, 17 February 2016 (UTC) ‡ National team caps and goals as of 11:23, 17 February 2016 (UTC)

Anna Susanne Moberg (born 13 February 1986) is a former Swedish footballer who played for Damallsvenskan club Kristianstads DFF and the Swedish national team. She was one of four reserve players named in the national squad for the 2012 Summer Olympics.

Moberg made her senior national team debut against Germany in October 2011.

She was attached to Malmö FF as a youth player but became unsettled and returned home to Ystad. After signing for Kristianstads DFF in 2003, she missed eight months across the 2005 and 2006 seasons with an anterior cruciate ligament injury. Moberg is a qualified teacher.

In May 2013 it was reported that a loss of form had seen Moberg dropped from Kristianstads' starting 11, jeopardising her chances of being selected for UEFA Women's Euro 2013.

In October 2015, after having played all 13 seasons of her professional career for Kristianstads, a team she also captained for years, Moberg announced she was retiring from football at the conclusion of the 2015 Damallsvenskan season.
