= Marie Bjerg =

Danish footballer (born 1988)

Personal information
- Date of birth: 16 July 1988 (age 38)
- Position: Defender

Senior career*
Years	Team	Apps	(Gls)
- B52/Aalborg
- IK Skovbakken

International career^{‡}
2007–	Denmark	1	(0)
- * Club domestic league appearances and goals ‡ National team caps and goals as of 18 December 2007

Marie Bjerg (born 16 July 1988) is a Danish football defender. She plays for IK Skovbakken and the Danish national team.
