= Karolina Wigura =

- Karolina Jadwiga Wigura-Kuisz
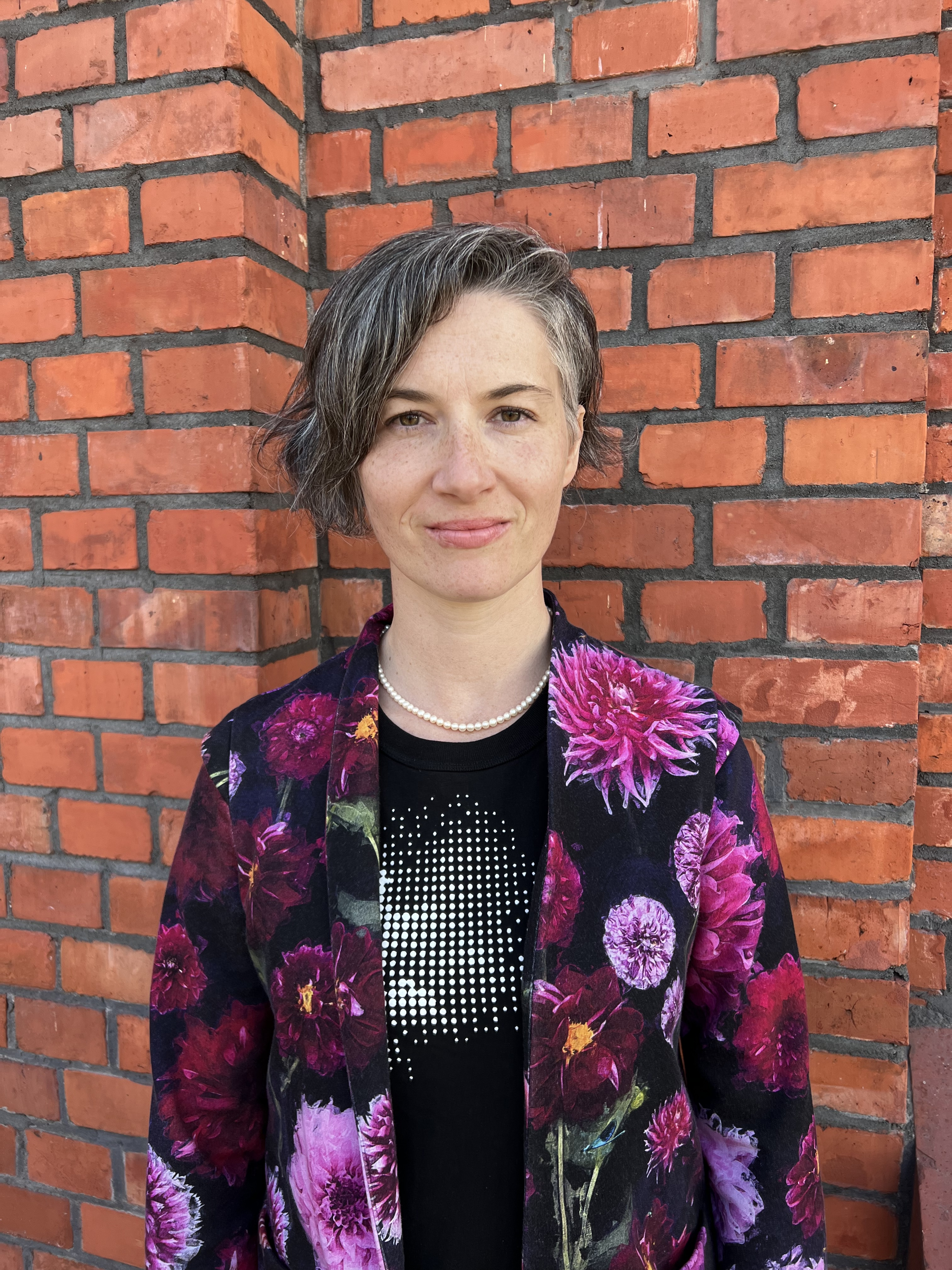
- Karolina Wigura (2023)
- Born: 1 October 1980 (age 45); Warsaw, Poland
- Education: Habilitated doctor of social sciences
- Alma mater: University of Warsaw
- Occupations: Sociologist, journalist, publicist

Karolina Wigura (born 1 October 1980 in Warsaw) is a sociologist, historian of ideas and journalist. She is Member of the Board of Kultura Liberalna Foundation (Liberal Culture), which publishes Kultura Liberalna, one of Poland's leading weekly magazines. She is also a Senior Fellow of the German liberal-conservative thinktank Zentrum Liberale Moderne (LibMod), an assistant professor at the University of Warsaw's Institute of Sociology and a member of the European Council on Foreign Relations.

== Academic background ==
Karolina Wigura graduated from the Institute of Sociology (2003) and Political Science (2005) under the programme of the College of Inter-Area Individual Studies In the Humanities and Social Sciences at the University of Warsaw. Her doctorate thesis was conducted as part of a PhD program at the Institute of Sociology (University of Warsaw, UW) and at the Faculty of Philosophy and Theology at LMU Munich. She graduated in 2009 with a thesis "Declarations of Forgiveness and Repentance in Politics: Examples from the history of Poland, Germany and Ukraine, 1945-2006. Theories and Practice”. Wigura obtained her habilitation from the Faculty of Sociology, Warsaw University, in 2020 for the book Wynalazek nowoczesnego serca. Filozoficzne źródła współczesnego myślenia o emocjach (The Invention of Modern Heart. Philosophical Sources of Contemporary Thinking of Emotions). She works as a research associate at Free University of Berlin and as a lecturer at Warsaw University's Faculty of Sociology at the Department of the History of Social Thought.

Her academic interests include political philosophy of the twentieth century, especially of Hannah Arendt, Paul Ricoeur, Vladimir Jankélévitch and Karl Jaspers; sociology and ethics of memory, with a focus on transitional justice, historical guilt, reconciliation and forgiveness in politics – these are the core themes of the book she published in 2011, titled “Wina narodów. Przebaczenie jako strategia prowadzenia polityki" (The Guilt of Nations. Forgiveness as a Political Strategy). She also devotes her research to the history of ideas of emotions. In 2019 she published a book devoted to these subjects under the title "Wynalazek nowoczesnego serca. Filozoficzne źródła współczesnego myślenia o emocjach" (The Invention of Modern Heart. Philosophical Sources of Contemporary Thinking of Emotions). In the book, she argued that the seventeenth century philosophy, especially of Thomas Hobbes, Baruch Spinoza and René Descartes, made a decisive contribution to the creation of the contemporary concept of emotions.

Her book “Wina narodów” was awarded the Józef Tischner’s prize in 2012, and was nominated for the Jerzy Turowicz’s prize a year later. Her book „Wynalazek nowoczesnego serca” was nominated for the Tadeusz Kotarbiński's prize in 2019. She was awarded the Bronisław Geremek’s Junior Visiting Scholarship at the Institute for Human Sciences in Vienna (2012/2013), the Marshal Memorial Fellowship from the German Marshall Fund and was a POMP (Programme on Modern Poland) Visiting Fellow in St. Antony’s College at University of Oxford (2016). In the academic year 2019/2020 she was a visiting fellow at the Institute of Advanced Study in Berlin (2019/2020) and in the academic year 2021/2022 – a fellow of the Robert Bosch Academy in Berlin. Wigura has also conducted research at Central European University in Budapest (2015) and secured research grants from the National Science Centre in Poland – “Preludium” and “Sonata”. She gratudated from the Leadership Academy for Poland in 2018.

From 2016 to 2018, together with Jarosław Kuisz, she was co-directing the Polish Programme at St. Antony's College at Oxford University, entitled “Knowledge Bridges: Poland - Britain - Europe”. The programme was devoted to politics of Poland, presented in a wide, international perspective. Intellectuals who took part in the variety of activities organized under the programme of “Knowledge Bridges” included Agnieszka Holland, Aleksander Smolar, Jan Kubik, Andrzej Rapaczyński, Wolfgang Merkel, Jacques Rupnik, Jan Zielonka, Norman Davies, and many others. The academic supervisor of the programme was Timothy Garton Ash.

== Journalism, commentary and essays ==
Karolina Wigura worked as a journalist for the Polskie Radio Program II (Polish Radio Two) between 2003 and 2006 and, up until 2009 in Tygodnik Idei Europa [Europe Weekly], the intellectual cultural-political supplement to the daily Dziennik. Polska Europa Świat. She was awarded the 2008 Polish Grand Press prize for her interview with Jürgen Habermas “Europe in death paralysis”, published in “Europa” earlier that year.

She is a co-founder of Kultura Liberalna (Liberal Culture), Poland's leading online intellectual, political and cultural weekly. She is Member of the Board of the Kultura Liberalna Foundation. Her work has been published in The Guardian, The New York Times, Gazeta Wyborcza, Rzeczpospolita, Przegląd Polityczny, Tygodnik Powszechny, Znak and other periodicals. In 2015, together with Marek Zając, she prepared a political and cultural television programme for TVP Kultura (Polish cultural public television channel), entitled “To nie tak” (It is not like that). In 2019 and 2020, together with Tomasz Terlikowski and Mariusz Cieślik she worked in a cultural programme for TVP Kultura “Tego się nie wytnie” (This will not be cut). Since 2021, she has been a regular columnist for the German Berlin-based daily Die Tageszeitung (taz). She frequently provides commentary on Polish and international politics for print and electronic media. In December 2022 Kultura Liberalna Foundation published the book “Polish Atheist vs. Polish Catholic” by Karolina Wigura and Tomasz Terlikowski, addressing 11 discussions on most controversial subjects, in Poland and abroad, like abortion, euthanasia, same sex marriages, religious feelings, etc.

Among her most important journalistic interventions there are the essay published in The Guardian about Poland after 2016, where she argued that the Law and Justice's victory in Poland in 2015 was a result of widespread frustrations and a return to the pre-2015 period would not be desirable, and the two essays in The New York Times she co-authored with Jarosław Kuisz. The first, titled "Against Liberal Defeatism" was a pladoyer for hope in politics. "Liberalism means belief in the freedom of the individual; therefore it demands trust in the people. It also requires optimism. In order not to fall into dangerous determinism or counterproductive defensiveness, we have to remember that the greatest successes of liberal democracies emerged from hope" - Kuisz and Wigura wrote. In the second, "Want to Save Europe? Learn From Poland", they wrote: "It’s true that democracy has suffered under Law and Justice. But there’s another story about Poland that needs to be told, one about how liberals are learning to fight for democracy" and described the new strategies liberal politicians were inventing in the struggle with populism in Poland.

== Public activities ==
Karolina Wigura is a widely invited public speaker, concentrating mostly on emotions in politics, national populism, liberal democracy, Poland and Polish-German relations. In the recent years, she was invited both as panelist and keynote speaker to Athens Democracy Forum, Delphi Economic Forum, Annual Meetings of the ECFR, Annual Meetings of Zentrum Liberale Moderne, Amsterdam-based De Balie, Forum 2000 in Prague, Baden-Baden Entrepreneur Talks, European Forum for New Ideas (EFNI) in Sopot, where she spoke about the feeling of loss, and politics of fear vs. politics of hope.

Between 2012 and 2016, she was a member of the board of Stefan Batory Foundation. She has also been a member of the Programme Board of the Congress of Women and a member of the Programme Board of EFNI since 2014.

== Publications ==
Selection

- Wigura K.; Kuisz J.; Posttraumatische Souveränität, Suhrkamp Verlag 2023.
- Wigura K.; T. Terlikowski; Polka ateistka kontra Polak katolik, Wydawnictwo Kultury Liberalnej 2022.
- Wigura K.; Kuisz J.; essay in The Guardian; The missile strike has ignited visceral fear in Poland, and poses hard questions for Nato (11.2022)
- Wigura K.; Kuisz J.; essay in Foreign Policy; Will the Ukraine War Return Poland to Europe’s Democratic Fold? Europe and Poland need each other more than ever. (08.2022)
- Wigura K.; Kuisz J.; essay in The Internationale Politik Quarterly; The EU and the War in Ukraine (I): The Curse of Being Important. A View from Poland (07.2022)
- Wigura K.; Kuisz J.; essay in The New York Times; America Thinks the War Is About Ukraine. Russia’s Neighbors Disagree (03.2022)
- Wigura K.; Kuisz J.; essay in The Guardian; Poland’s door is wide open to Ukrainians – we know these refugees could be us (03.2022)
- Wigura K.; Kuisz J.; essay in The Guardian; From eastern Europe, we watch Ukraine in fear. Its fate could decide the continent’s future (02.2022)
- Wigura K.; Kuisz J.; essay in ECFR.eu; All the rage: The pandemic’s emotional politics (02.2022)
- Wigura K.; Kuisz J.; essay in The New York Times; What Happened to Poland (12.2021)
- Wigura K.; Kuisz J.; essay in ECFR.eu; Covid bereavement as a European experience (10.2021)
- Wigura K.; Kuisz J., The Pushback Against Populism: Reclaiming the Politics of Emotion, Journal of Democracy, 31 (2) 2020: 41–53.
- Wigura, K.; Kuisz J., The End of The Liberal Mind: Poland’s New Politics, Wydawnictwo Kultury Liberalnej 2020.
- Wigura K., Wynalazek nowoczesnego serca. Filozoficzne źródła współczesnego myślenia o emocjach, Wydawnictwo Naukowe Scholar 2020.
- Wigura K.; Kuisz J.; Sadurski W., Trudne rozliczenia z przeszłością. T. 1, Sprawiedliwość okresu przejściowego w perspektywie międzynarodowej, Wydawnictwo Naukowe Scholar 2018.
- Wigura K.; Kuisz J.; Sadurski W., Trudne rozliczenia z przeszłością. T. 2, Polska w perspektywie Europy Środkowo-Wschodniej, Wydawnictwo Naukowe Scholar 2018.
- Wigura K., Declarations of forgiveness and remorse in European politics, European Legacy – Toward New Paradigms, 22 (1) 2020: 16–30.
- Wigura K., Namiętności, uczucia, czy emocje? Trzy tradycje myślenia o afektach i trzy doktryny afektów w polityce, Kultura i Społeczeństwo 4, 2017: 3-25.
- Wigura K., Dämonologie. Polen vor vier verlorenen Jahren, Osteuropa 1–2, 2016: 109–117.
- Wigura K., Alternative Historical Narrative. Polish bishops’ appeal to their German colleagues of 18 November 1965, East European Politics and Societies and Cultures, 27 (3), 2013: 400–412.
- Wigura K., Wina narodów. Przebaczenie jako strategia prowadzenia polityki, Wydawnictwo Naukowe Scholar 2011.
