= Mette Jensen =

Danish footballer (born 1987)

Personal information
- Full name: Mette V. Jensen
- Date of birth: 28 May 1987 (age 39)
- Position: Midfielder

Team information
- Current team: Fortuna Hjørring
- Number: 17

Senior career*
Years	Team	Apps	(Gls)
2009–2015	Fortuna Hjørring	24	(1)

International career^{‡}
2006–	Denmark	12	(0)
- * Club domestic league appearances and goals ‡ National team caps and goals as of 27 October 2015

Mette V. Jensen (born 28 May 1987) is a Danish football midfielder. She currently plays for Fortuna Hjørring and the Danish national team.
