= 2014–15 UEFA Women's Champions League knockout phase =

Tournament details
- Dates: 08 October 2014 – 14 May 2015
- Teams: 32

The 2014–15 UEFA Women's Champions League knockout phase began on 8 October 2014 and concluded on 14 May 2015 with the final at Friedrich-Ludwig-Jahn-Sportpark in Berlin, Germany to decide the champions of the 2014–15 UEFA Women's Champions League. A total of 32 teams competed in the knockout phase.

Times from 26 October 2014 up to 28 March 2015 (round of 16, quarter-finals first legs and first day of second legs) are CET (UTC+1), all other times are CEST (UTC+2).

== Round and draw dates ==
UEFA has scheduled the competition as follows. In contrast to previous seasons, quarter-finals and semi-finals are now played on weekends.

Round	Draw	First leg	Second leg
Round of 32	22 August 2014, 13:30	8–9 October 2014	15–16 October 2014
Round of 16	22 August 2014, 13:30	8–9 November 2014	12–13 November 2014
Quarter-finals	19 November 2014, 14:00	21–22 March 2015	28–29 March 2015
Semi-finals	19 November 2014, 14:00	18–19 April 2015	25–26 April 2015
Final	19 November 2014, 14:00	14 May 2015 at Friedrich-Ludwig-Jahn-Sportpark, Berlin	

== Format ==
The knockout phase involved 32 teams: 22 teams which qualified directly, and 10 teams which qualified from the qualifying round (eight group winners and two best runners-up).

Each tie in the knockout phase, apart from the final, was played over two legs, with each team playing one leg at home. The team that scored more goals on aggregate over the two legs advanced to the next round. If the aggregate score was level, the away goals rule was applied, i.e. the team that scored more goals away from home over the two legs advanced. If away goals were also equal, then 30 minutes of extra time were played. The away goals rule was again applied after extra time, i.e. if there were goals scored during extra time and the aggregate score was still level, the visiting team advanced by virtue of more away goals scored. If no goals were scored during extra time, the tie was decided by a penalty shoot-out. In the final, which was played as a single match, if scores were level at the end of normal time, extra time was played, followed by a penalty shoot-out if scores remained tied.

The mechanism of the draws for each round was as follows:

- In the draw for the round of 32, 16 teams were seeded and 16 teams were unseeded, based on their UEFA club coefficients at the beginning of the season. The seeded teams were drawn against the unseeded teams, with the seeded teams hosting the second leg. Teams from the same group or the same association could not be drawn against each other.
- In the draws for the round of 16 onwards, there were no seedings, and teams from the same group or the same association could be drawn against each other.

== Qualified teams ==
Below were the 32 teams which qualified for the knockout phase (with their 2014 UEFA club coefficients).

Seeded in round of 32 draw
Team	Coeff
(Germany) Wolfsburg	78.249
(France) Lyon	127.905
(Italy) Torres	68.035
(Sweden) Rosengård	54.295
(Denmark) Fortuna Hjørring	47.550
(Germany) Frankfurt	47.249
(Austria) Neulengbach	46.395
(Denmark) Brøndby	45.550
(Czech Republic) Sparta Prague	45.220
(Sweden) Linköping	44.295
(France) Paris Saint-Germain	39.905
(Russia) Zvezda Perm	38.510
(Scotland) Glasgow City	29.260
(Spain) Barcelona	25.550
(Switzerland) Zürich	23.600
(England) Bristol Academy	23.305

Unseeded in round of 32 draw
Team	Coeff
(Norway) Stabæk	22.900
(Cyprus) Apollon Limassol	21.280
(England) Liverpool	19.305
(Hungary) MTK	16.285
(Russia) Ryazan VDV	15.510
(Kazakhstan) BIIK Kazygurt	14.270
(Italy) Brescia	13.035
(Netherlands) Twente	11.940
(Czech Republic) Slavia Prague	11.220
(Iceland) Stjarnan	9.610
(Croatia) Osijek	6.650
(Slovenia) Pomurje	6.475
(Poland) Medyk Konin	6.105
(Lithuania) Gintra Universitetas	5.320
(Portugal) Atlético Ouriense	4.305
(Republic of Ireland) Raheny United	3.640

Notes

1. ^{TH} Title holders (automatically placed at the top position of seeding list)
2. ^{QR} Qualified from qualifying round

== Bracket ==
Round of 32
(Czech Republic) Slavia Prague	0	0	0
(Spain) Barcelona	1	3	4
(Republic of Ireland) Raheny United	0	1	1
(England) Bristol Academy	4	2	6
(Kazakhstan) BIIK Kazygurt	2	0	2
(Germany) Frankfurt	2	4	6
(Slovenia) Pomurje	2	1	3
(Italy) Torres	4	3	7
(England) Liverpool	2	0	2
(Sweden) Linköping	1	3	4
(Iceland) Stjarnan	2	1	3
(Russia) Zvezda Perm	5	3	8
(Cyprus) Apollon Limassol	1	1	2
(Denmark) Brøndby (a.e.t.)	0	3	3
(Lithuania) Gintra Universitetas (p)	1	1	2
(Czech Republic) Sparta Prague	1	1	2
(Hungary) MTK	1	2	3
(Austria) Neulengbach (a.e.t.)	2	2	4
(Norway) Stabæk	0	1	1
(Germany) Wolfsburg	1	2	3
(Russia) Ryazan VDV	1	0	1
(Sweden) Rosengård	3	2	5
(Portugal) Atlético Ouriense	0	0	0
(Denmark) Fortuna Hjørring	3	6	9
(Croatia) Osijek	2	0	2
(Switzerland) Zürich	5	2	7
(Poland) Medyk Konin	2	0	2
(Scotland) Glasgow City (a.e.t.)	0	3	3
(Netherlands) Twente	1	0	1
(France) Paris Saint-Germain	2	1	3
(Italy) Brescia	0	0	0
(France) Lyon	5	9	14

Round of 16
(Spain) Barcelona	0	1	1
(England) Bristol Academy	1	1	2
(Germany) Frankfurt	5	4	9
(Italy) Torres	0	0	0
(Sweden) Linköping	5	0	5
(Russia) Zvezda Perm	0	3	3
(Denmark) Brøndby	5	0	5
(Lithuania) Gintra Universitetas	0	2	2
(Austria) Neulengbach	0	0	0
(Germany) Wolfsburg	4	7	11
(Sweden) Rosengård	2	2	4
(Denmark) Fortuna Hjørring	1	0	1
(Switzerland) Zürich	2	2	4
(Scotland) Glasgow City	1	4	5
(France) Paris Saint-Germain	1	1	2
(France) Lyon	1	0	1

Quarter-final
(England) Bristol Academy	0	0	0
(Germany) Frankfurt	5	7	12
(Sweden) Linköping	0	1	1
(Denmark) Brøndby	1	1	2
(Germany) Wolfsburg (a)	1	3	4
(Sweden) Rosengård	1	3	4
(Scotland) Glasgow City	0	0	0
(France) Paris Saint-Germain	2	5	7

Semi-final
(Germany) Frankfurt	7	6	13
(Denmark) Brøndby	0	0	0
(Germany) Wolfsburg	0	2	2
(France) Paris Saint-Germain	2	1	3

Final
(Germany) Frankfurt	2
(France) Paris Saint-Germain	1

== Round of 32 ==
The draw was held on 22 August 2014. The first legs were played on 8 and 9 October, and the second legs were played on 15 and 16 October 2014.

Team 1	Agg.	Team 2	1st leg	2nd leg
Medyk Konin (Poland)	2–3	(Scotland) Glasgow City	2–0	0–3 (a.e.t.)
Ryazan VDV (Russia)	1–5	(Sweden) Rosengård	1–3	0–2
Brescia (Italy)	0–14	(France) Lyon	0–5	0–9
Atlético Ouriense (Portugal)	0–9	(Denmark) Fortuna Hjørring	0–3	0–6
Slavia Prague (Czech Republic)	0–4	(Spain) Barcelona	0–1	0–3
Raheny United (Republic of Ireland)	1–6	(England) Bristol Academy	0–4	1–2
BIIK Kazygurt (Kazakhstan)	2–6	(Germany) Frankfurt	2–2	0–4
Gintra Universitetas (Lithuania)	2–2 (5–4 p)	(Czech Republic) Sparta Prague	1–1	1–1 (a.e.t.)
Pomurje (Slovenia)	3–7	(Italy) Torres	2–4	1–3
Stabæk (Norway)	1–3	(Germany) Wolfsburg	0–1	1–2
Apollon Limassol (Cyprus)	2–3	(Denmark) Brøndby	1–0	1–3 (a.e.t.)
MTK (Hungary)	3–4	(Austria) Neulengbach	1–2	2–2 (a.e.t.)
Osijek (Croatia)	2–7	(Switzerland) Zürich	2–5	0–2
Liverpool (England)	2–4	(Sweden) Linköping	2–1	0–3
Twente (Netherlands)	1–3	(France) Paris Saint-Germain	1–2	0–1
Stjarnan (Iceland)	3–8	(Russia) Zvezda Perm	2–5	1–3

8 October 2014
10:00

BIIK Kazygurt (Kazakhstan)	2–2	(Germany) Frankfurt
Gabelia 50'; Nikolić 90+1'	Report	Boquete 66'; Marozsán 85'

Kazhimukan Munaitpasov Stadium, Shymkent
Attendance: 800
Referee: Séverine Zinck (France)
16 October 2014
15:00

Frankfurt (Germany)	4–0	(Kazakhstan) BIIK Kazygurt
Marozsán 40'; Garefrekes 73'; Šašić 75', 90+3'	Report

Stadion am Brentanobad, Frankfurt
Attendance: 1,460
Referee: Vesna Budimir (Croatia)

Frankfurt won 6–2 on aggregate.

8 October 2014
13:00

Ryazan VDV (Russia)	1–3	(Sweden) Rosengård
Tsybutovich 75'	Report	Schmidt 52'; Marta 64'; Mittag 90+2'

CSK Stadium, Ryazan
Attendance: 3,400
Referee: Bibiana Steinhaus (Germany)
15 October 2014
19:00

Rosengård (Sweden)	2–0	(Russia) Ryazan VDV
Mittag 20', 35'	Report

Malmö IP, Malmö
Attendance: 1,211
Referee: Efthalia Mitsi (Greece)

Rosengård won 5–1 on aggregate.

8 October 2014
15:00

Apollon Limassol (Cyprus)	1–0	(Denmark) Brøndby
Sanderson 90' (pen.)	Report

Tsirion Stadium, Limassol
Attendance: 700
Referee: Petra Chudá (Slovakia)
16 October 2014
18:30

Brøndby (Denmark)	3–1 (a.e.t.)	(Cyprus) Apollon Limassol
Sørensen 40'; Thestrup 104'; Madsen 112'	Report	Sanderson 95'

Brøndby Stadium, Brøndby
Attendance: 1,471
Referee: Amy Fearn (England)

Brøndby won 3–2 on aggregate.

8 October 2014
15:30

Medyk Konin (Poland)	2–0	(Scotland) Glasgow City
Pajor 53'; Sikora 64'	Report

Miejski Im. Zkotej Jedenastki, Konin
Attendance: 3,000
Referee: Sandra Bastos (Portugal)
15 October 2014
20:30

Glasgow City (Scotland)	3–0 (a.e.t.)	(Poland) Medyk Konin
Love 59'; Fairlie 77'; O'Sullivan 94'	Report

Excelsior Stadium, Airdrie
Attendance: 775
Referee: Anastasia Pustovoitova (Russia)

Glasgow City won 3–2 on aggregate.

8 October 2014
17:00

Gintra Universitetas (Lithuania)	1–1	(Czech Republic) Sparta Prague
Vaičiulaitytė 81'	Report	Křivská 42'

Savivaldybė Stadium, Šiauliai
Attendance: 1,200
Referee: Sharon Sluyts (Belgium)
15 October 2014
18:00

Sparta Prague (Czech Republic)	1–1 (a.e.t.)	(Lithuania) Gintra Universitetas
Bertholdová 59'	Report	Imanalijeva 37'
Penalties
Hloupá (penalty scored); Bertholdová (penalty scored); Bartoňová (penalty scored); Čulová (penalty scored); Vaičiulaitytė (penalty missed); Krejčiříková (penalty missed)	4–5	(penalty scored) Budrytė; (penalty scored) Alekperova; (penalty scored) Laetitia; (penalty missed) Chinasa; (penalty scored) Budestean; (penalty scored) Imanalijeva

Generali Arena, Prague
Attendance: 1,015
Referee: Elia Martinez (Spain)

2–2 on aggregate. Gintra Universitetas won 5–4 on penalties.

8 October 2014
18:00

MTK (Hungary)	1–2	(Austria) Neulengbach
Méry 61'	Report	Burger 35'; Tasch 47'

Pancho Arena, Felcsút
Attendance: 400
Referee: Stéphanie Frappart (France)
15 October 2014
19:00

Neulengbach (Austria)	2–2 (a.e.t.)	(Hungary) MTK
Wasser 57'; Vojteková 120' (pen.)	Report	L. Nagy 88'; Fogl 90+1'

Wienerwaldstadion, Neulengbach
Attendance: 800
Referee: Monika Mularczyk (Poland)

Neulengbach won 4–3 on aggregate.

8 October 2014
18:00

Osijek (Croatia)	2–5	(Switzerland) Zürich
Joščak 10'; Andrlić 52'	Report	Humm 45+2', 66'; Deplazes 54'; Cepernić 69' (o.g.); Terchoun 88'

Stadion Gradski vrt, Osijek
Attendance: 1,200
Referee: Sofia Karagiorgi (Cyprus)
15 October 2014
19:00

Zürich (Switzerland)	2–0	(Croatia) Osijek
Humm 59', 65'	Report

Letzigrund, Zürich
Attendance: 4,112
Referee: Linn Andersson (Sweden)

Zürich won 7–2 on aggregate.

8 October 2014
18:00

Stabæk (Norway)	0–1	(Germany) Wolfsburg
	Report	Fischer 56'

Nadderud stadion, Bekkestua
Attendance: 956
Referee: Jana Adámková (Czech Republic)
16 October 2014
17:00

Wolfsburg (Germany)	2–1	(Norway) Stabæk
Hansen 12', 84'	Report	Wiik 56'

VfL-Stadion am Elsterweg, Wolfsburg
Attendance: 1,234
Referee: Gyöngyi Gaál (Hungary)

Wolfsburg won 3–1 on aggregate.

8 October 2014
18:30

Slavia Prague (Czech Republic)	0–1	(Spain) Barcelona
	Report	García 82'

Eden Arena, Prague
Attendance: 4,224
Referee: Kateryna Zora (Ukraine)
15 October 2014
19:00

Barcelona (Spain)	3–0	(Czech Republic) Slavia Prague
Alexia 20'; Sonia 27'; Romero 57'	Report

Mini Estadi, Barcelona
Attendance: 994
Referee: Sara Persson (Sweden)

Barcelona won 4–0 on aggregate.

8 October 2014
19:00

Pomurje (Slovenia)	2–4	(Italy) Torres
Zver 53'; Rogan 55'	Report	Serrano 15'; Pinna 30'; Flaviano 69'; Maglia 88'

Lendava Sports Park, Lendava
Attendance: 1,200
Referee: Rhona Daly (Republic of Ireland)
15 October 2014
20:45

Torres (Italy)	3–1	(Slovenia) Pomurje
Flaviano 66'; Tona 69'; Domenichetti 88'	Report	Zver 56'

Stadio Vanni Sanna, Sassari
Attendance: 250
Referee: Karolina Radzik-Johan (Poland)

Torres won 7–3 on aggregate.

8 October 2014
19:00

Twente (Netherlands)	1–2	(France) Paris Saint-Germain
Jansen 61'	Report	Asllani 10'; Cruz Traña 19'

De Grolsch Veste, Enschede
Attendance: 3,100
Referee: Riem Hussein (Germany)
15 October 2014
21:00

Paris Saint-Germain (France)	1–0	(Netherlands) Twente
Horan 83'	Report

Stade Sébastien Charléty, Paris
Attendance: 1,310
Referee: Morag Pirie (Scotland)

Paris Saint-Germain won 3–1 on aggregate.

8 October 2014
19:30

Liverpool (England)	2–1	(Sweden) Linköping
Davison 14'; Dowie 73'	Report	Minde 37'

Halton Stadium, Widnes
Attendance: 627
Referee: Kateryna Monzul (Ukraine)
16 October 2014
19:00

Linköping (Sweden)	3–0	(England) Liverpool
Rolfö 24', 40', 56'	Report

Linköping Arena, Linköping
Attendance: 1,310
Referee: Cristina Dorcioman (Romania)

Linköping won 4–2 on aggregate.

8 October 2014
20:45

Atlético Ouriense (Portugal)	0–3	(Denmark) Fortuna Hjørring
	Report	Pedersen 38'; Jensen 39'; Nadim 84' (pen.)

Estádio Municipal, Fátima
Attendance: 900
Referee: Zuzana Kováčová (Slovakia)
15 October 2014
15:00

Fortuna Hjørring (Denmark)	6–0	(Portugal) Atlético Ouriense
Larsen 18', 28'; Thøgersen 35'; Hovesen 69'; Nadim 76', 87'	Report

Frederikshavn Stadion, Frederikshavn
Attendance: 654
Referee: Olga Zadinová (Czech Republic)

Fortuna Hjørring won 9–0 on aggregate.

8 October 2014
22:00

Stjarnan (Iceland)	2–5	(Russia) Zvezda Perm
Þorsteinsdóttir 31'; K. Kristjansdóttir 65'	Report	Nahi 5', 12', 39', 89'; Apanaschenko 90+3' (pen.)

Stjörnuvöllur, Reykjavík
Attendance: 562
Referee: Esther Staubli (Switzerland)
16 October 2014
15:00

Zvezda Perm (Russia)	3–1	(Iceland) Stjarnan
Kipyatkova 18'; Apanaschenko 51'; Pozdeeva 64'	Report	A. Kristjansdóttir 75'

Zvezda Stadium, Perm
Attendance: 3,500
Referee: Katalin Kulcsár (Hungary)

Zvezda Perm won 8–3 on aggregate.

9 October 2014
20:30

Raheny United (Republic of Ireland)	0–4	(England) Bristol Academy
	Report	Harding 29', 78'; Watts 90+2' (pen.); Natalia 90+4'

Richmond Park, Dublin
Attendance: 1,248
Referee: Eleni Lampadariou (Greece)
16 October 2014
20:30

Bristol Academy (England)	2–1	(Republic of Ireland) Raheny United
Natalia 50'; James 59'	Report	Slattery 74'

Ashton Gate Stadium, Bristol
Attendance: 816
Referee: Marija Kurtes (Germany)

Bristol Academy won 6–1 on aggregate.

9 October 2014
20:30

Brescia (Italy)	0–5	(France) Lyon
	Report	Nécib 12'; Schelin 20'; Renard 23'; Le Sommer 56', 67'

Stadio Mario Rigamonti, Brescia
Attendance: 5,012
Referee: Pernilla Larsson (Sweden)
15 October 2014
19:00

Lyon (France)	9–0	(Italy) Brescia
Le Sommer 14', 20', 47'; Nécib 30'; Abily 32', 52', 73'; Hegerberg 45+1'; Schelin 69'	Report

Stade de Gerland, Lyon
Attendance: 4,270
Referee: Teodora Albon (Romania)

Lyon won 14–0 on aggregate.

== Round of 16 ==
The draw was held on 22 August 2014. The first legs were played on 8 and 9 November, and the second legs were played on 12 and 13 November 2014.

Team 1	Agg.	Team 2	1st leg	2nd leg
Zürich (Switzerland)	4–5	(Scotland) Glasgow City	2–1	2–4
Rosengård (Sweden)	4–1	(Denmark) Fortuna Hjørring	2–1	2–0
Paris Saint-Germain (France)	2–1	(France) Lyon	1–1	1–0
Neulengbach (Austria)	0–11	(Germany) Wolfsburg	0–4	0–7
Linköping (Sweden)	5–3	(Russia) Zvezda Perm	5–0	0–3
Barcelona (Spain)	1–2	(England) Bristol Academy	0–1	1–1
Frankfurt (Germany)	9–0	(Italy) Torres	5–0	4–0
Brøndby (Denmark)	5–2	(Lithuania) Gintra Universitetas	5–0	0–2

Notes

1. Order of legs reversed after original draw.
8 November 2014
15:00

Rosengård (Sweden)	2–1	(Denmark) Fortuna Hjørring
Mittag 12'; Schmidt 66'	Report	Pedersen 56'

Malmö IP, Malmö
Attendance: 1,658
Referee: Gyöngyi Gaál (Hungary)
13 November 2014
19:30

Fortuna Hjørring (Denmark)	0–2	(Sweden) Rosengård
	Report	Marta 44' (pen.); Schmidt 77'

Nordjyske Arena, Aalborg
Attendance: 1,009
Referee: Monika Mularczyk (Poland)

Rosengård won 4–1 on aggregate.

8 November 2014
15:00

Linköping (Sweden)	5–0	(Russia) Zvezda Perm
Rohlin 11'; Harder 26'; Rolfö 37'; Eriksson 39'; Knudsen 75'	Report

Linköping Arena, Linköping
Attendance: 495
Referee: Olga Zadinová (Czech Republic)
13 November 2014
15:00

Zvezda Perm (Russia)	3–0	(Sweden) Linköping
Pantyukhina 1'; Nahi 58'; Andrushchak 86'	Report

Zvezda Stadium, Perm
Attendance: 1,000
Referee: Sandra Bastos (Portugal)

Linköping won 5–3 on aggregate.

8 November 2014
18:00

Paris Saint-Germain (France)	1–1	(France) Lyon
Alushi 49'	Report	Petit 21'

Stade Sébastien Charléty, Paris
Attendance: 6,300
Referee: Kateryna Monzul (Ukraine)
12 November 2014
18:45

Lyon (France)	0–1	(France) Paris Saint-Germain
	Report	Alushi 80'

Stade de Gerland, Lyon
Attendance: 8,488
Referee: Katalin Kulcsár (Hungary)

Paris Saint-Germain won 2–1 on aggregate.

8 November 2014
19:00

Barcelona (Spain)	0–1	(England) Bristol Academy
	Report	Corredera 26' (o.g.)

Mini Estadi, Barcelona
Attendance: 870
Referee: Cristina Dorcioman (Romania)
13 November 2014
20:30

Bristol Academy (England)	1–1	(Spain) Barcelona
Watts 83' (pen.)	Report	Losada 40'

Ashton Gate Stadium, Bristol
Attendance: 2,457
Referee: Anastasia Pustovoitova (Russia)

Bristol Academy won 2–1 on aggregate.

9 November 2014
13:00

Frankfurt (Germany)	5–0	(Italy) Torres
Šašić 7', 31'; Garefrekes 15'; Boquete 19'; Laudehr 45+1' (pen.)	Report

Stadion am Brentanobad, Frankfurt
Attendance: 2,320
Referee: Sara Persson (Sweden)
12 November 2014
15:00

Torres (Italy)	0–4	(Germany) Frankfurt
	Report	Marozsán 33'; Piacezzi 41' (o.g.); Šašić 45', 88'

Stadio Vanni Sanna, Sassari
Attendance: 120
Referee: Jana Adámková (Czech Republic)

Frankfurt won 9–0 on aggregate.

9 November 2014
13:00

Brøndby (Denmark)	5–0	(Lithuania) Gintra Universitetas
Lahmti 6'; Madsen 16', 21'; Alful 47'; Nielsen 89'	Report

Brøndby Stadium, Brøndby
Attendance: 1,175
Referee: Esther Azzopardi (Malta)
12 November 2014
17:00

Gintra Universitetas (Lithuania)	2–0	(Denmark) Brøndby
Vanagaitė 11'; Alekperova 42'	Report

Savivaldybė Stadium, Šiauliai
Attendance: 800
Referee: Riem Hussein (Germany)

Brøndby won 5–2 on aggregate.

9 November 2014
14:00

Neulengbach (Austria)	0–4	(Germany) Wolfsburg
	Report	Müller 16', 79'; Vojteková 63' (o.g.); Popp 81'

Wienerwaldstadion, Neulengbach
Attendance: 950
Referee: Efthalia Mitsi (Greece)
12 November 2014
17:00

Wolfsburg (Germany)	7–0	(Austria) Neulengbach
Magull 3', 32'; Popp 24'; Wagner 63', 65'; Fischer 89'; Bernauer 90+1'	Report

VfL-Stadion am Elsterweg, Wolfsburg
Attendance: 827
Referee: Teodora Albon (Romania)

Wolfsburg won 11–0 on aggregate.

9 November 2014
17:00

Zürich (Switzerland)	2–1	(Scotland) Glasgow City
Humm 10'; Stierli 59'	Report	Brown 52'

Letzigrund, Zürich
Attendance: 1,658
Referee: Stéphanie Frappart (France)
12 November 2014
20:30

Glasgow City (Scotland)	4–2	(Switzerland) Zürich
Grant 55'; Ross 64' (pen.); Love 81'; Lappin 87'	Report	Zehnder 45+9'; Humm 66'

Excelsior Stadium, Airdrie
Attendance: 698
Referee: Pernilla Larsson (Sweden)

Glasgow City won 5–4 on aggregate.

== Quarter-finals ==
The draw was held on 19 November 2014. The first legs were played on 21 and 22 March, and the second legs were played on 28 and 29 March 2015.

Team 1	Agg.	Team 2	1st leg	2nd leg
Bristol Academy (England)	0–12	(Germany) Frankfurt	0–5	0–7
Wolfsburg (Germany)	4–4 (a)	(Sweden) Rosengård	1–1	3–3
Glasgow City (Scotland)	0–7	(France) Paris Saint-Germain	0–2	0–5
Linköping (Sweden)	1–2	(Denmark) Brøndby	0–1	1–1

Notes

2. Order of legs reversed after original draw.
21 March 2015
15:00

Bristol Academy (England)	0–5	(Germany) Frankfurt
	Report	Boquete 36'; Schmidt 45'; Marozsán 66'; Islacker 78'; Garefrekes 81'

Ashton Gate Stadium, Bristol
Attendance: 1,447
Referee: Pernilla Larsson (Sweden)
29 March 2015
12:00

Frankfurt (Germany)	7–0	(England) Bristol Academy
Ando 8'; Marozsán 38'; Islacker 58', 68', 75'; Störzel 87'; Löber 90+3' (pen.)	Report

Stadion am Brentanobad, Frankfurt
Attendance: 2,380
Referee: Sandra Bastos (Portugal)

Frankfurt won 12–0 on aggregate.

22 March 2015
14:00

Linköping (Sweden)	0–1	(Denmark) Brøndby
	Report	Rohlin 14' (o.g.)

Linköping Arena, Linköping
Attendance: 837
Referee: Monika Mularczyk (Poland)
28 March 2015
14:00

Brøndby (Denmark)	1–1	(Sweden) Linköping
Madsen 6'	Report	Knudsen 44'

Brøndby Stadium, Brøndby
Attendance: 3,031
Referee: Bibiana Steinhaus (Germany)

Brøndby won 2–1 on aggregate.

22 March 2015
17:05

Glasgow City (Scotland)	0–2	(France) Paris Saint-Germain
	Report	Lahmari 19'; Hamraoui 53'

Excelsior Stadium, Airdrie
Attendance: 1,785
Referee: Riem Hussein (Germany)
28 March 2015
19:00

Paris Saint-Germain (France)	5–0	(Scotland) Glasgow City
Lappin 26' (o.g.); Delie 54', 68'; Delannoy 65' (pen.); Dali 87' (pen.)	Report

Parc des Princes, Paris
Attendance: 11,318
Referee: Gyöngyi Gaál (Hungary)

Paris Saint-Germain won 7–0 on aggregate.

22 March 2015
18:00

Wolfsburg (Germany)	1–1	(Sweden) Rosengård
Faißt 66'	Report	Marta 56'

AOK Stadion, Wolfsburg
Attendance: 1,674
Referee: Stéphanie Frappart (France)
28 March 2015
15:00

Rosengård (Sweden)	3–3	(Germany) Wolfsburg
Marta 24'; Mittag 42'; Gunnarsdóttir 90+3'	Report	Popp 4', 81'; Peter 55'

Malmö IP, Malmö
Attendance: 5,748
Referee: Esther Staubli (Switzerland)

4–4 on aggregate. Wolfsburg won on away goals.

== Semi-finals ==
The draw was held on 19 November 2014. The first legs were played on 18 and 19 April and the second legs on 25 and 26 April 2015.

Team 1	Agg.	Team 2	1st leg	2nd leg
Wolfsburg (Germany)	2–3	(France) Paris Saint-Germain	0–2	2–1
Frankfurt (Germany)	13–0	(Denmark) Brøndby	7–0	6–0

18 April 2015
18:00

Wolfsburg (Germany)	0–2	(France) Paris Saint-Germain
	Report	Delannoy 12' (pen.); Cruz Traña 26'

AOK Stadion, Wolfsburg
Attendance: 3,423
Referee: Pernilla Larsson (Sweden)
26 April 2015
18:00

Paris Saint-Germain (France)	1–2	(Germany) Wolfsburg
Kaci 6'	Report	Müller 71'; Jakabfi 74'

Stade Sébastien Charléty, Paris
Attendance: 3,555
Referee: Kateryna Monzul (Ukraine)

Paris Saint-Germain won 3–2 on aggregate.

19 April 2015
14:00

Frankfurt (Germany)	7–0	(Denmark) Brøndby
Šašić 10' (pen.), 32', 62', 69'; Sevecke 28' (o.g.); Marozsán 41'; Laudehr 46'	Report

Stadion am Brentanobad, Frankfurt
Attendance: 3,120
Referee: Katalin Kulcsár (Hungary)
25 April 2015
12:00

Brøndby (Denmark)	0–6	(Germany) Frankfurt
	Report	Boquete 7', 32', 84'; Šašić 14', 25', 39'

Brøndby Stadium, Brøndby
Attendance: 1,385
Referee: Efthalia Mitsi (Greece)

Frankfurt won 13–0 on aggregate.

== Final ==
The final was played on 14 May 2015 at Friedrich-Ludwig-Jahn-Sportpark in Berlin, Germany. The "home" team (for administrative purposes) was determined by an additional draw held after the semi-final draw.

14 May 2015
18:00

Frankfurt (Germany)	2–1	(France) Paris Saint-Germain
Šašić 32' Islacker 90+2'	Report	Delie 40'

Friedrich-Ludwig-Jahn-Sportpark, Berlin
Attendance: 17,147
Referee: Esther Staubli (Switzerland)
