= 2015 UEFA Women's Champions League final =

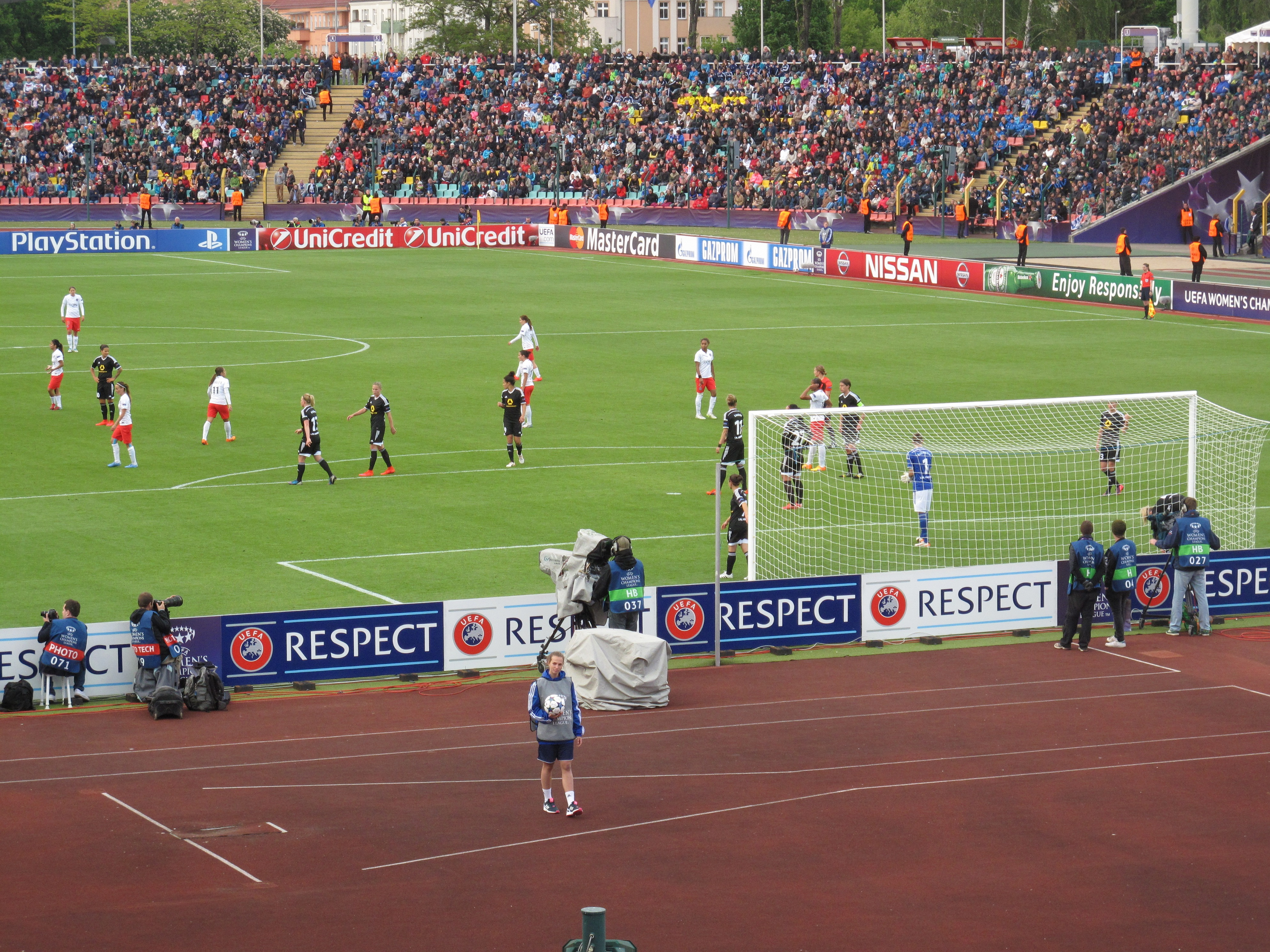
- Event: 2014–15 UEFA Women's Champions League
Frankfurt	Paris Saint-Germain
(Germany)	(France)
2	1
- Date: 14 May 2015
- Venue: Friedrich-Ludwig-Jahn-Sportpark, Berlin
- Referee: Esther Staubli (Switzerland)
- Attendance: 17,147
- Weather: Sunny

The 2015 UEFA Women's Champions League final was the final match of the 2014–15 UEFA Women's Champions League, the 14th season of the UEFA Women's Champions League football tournament and the sixth since it was renamed from the UEFA Women's Cup. The match was played at the Friedrich-Ludwig-Jahn-Sportpark in Berlin on 14 May 2015.

Frankfurt won the match 2–1 against Paris Saint-Germain.

== Route to the final ==
Note: In all results below, the score of the finalist is given first (H: home; A: away).

(Germany) Frankfurt				Round	(France) Paris Saint-Germain			
Opponent	Agg.	1st leg	2nd leg	Knockout phase	Opponent	Agg.	1st leg	2nd leg
(Kazakhstan) Kazygurt	6–2	2–2 (A)	4–0 (H)	Round of 32	(Netherlands) Twente	3–1	2–1 (A)	1–0 (H)
(Italy) Torres	9–0	5–0 (H)	4–0 (A)	Round of 16	(France) Lyon	2–1	1–1 (H)	1–0 (A)
(England) Bristol Academy	12–0	5–0 (A)	7–0 (H)	Quarter-finals	(Scotland) Glasgow City	7–0	2–0 (A)	5–0 (H)
(Denmark) Brøndby	13–0	7–0 (H)	6–0 (A)	Semi-finals	(Germany) Wolfsburg	3–2	2–0 (A)	1–2 (H)

== Match ==
=== Summary ===
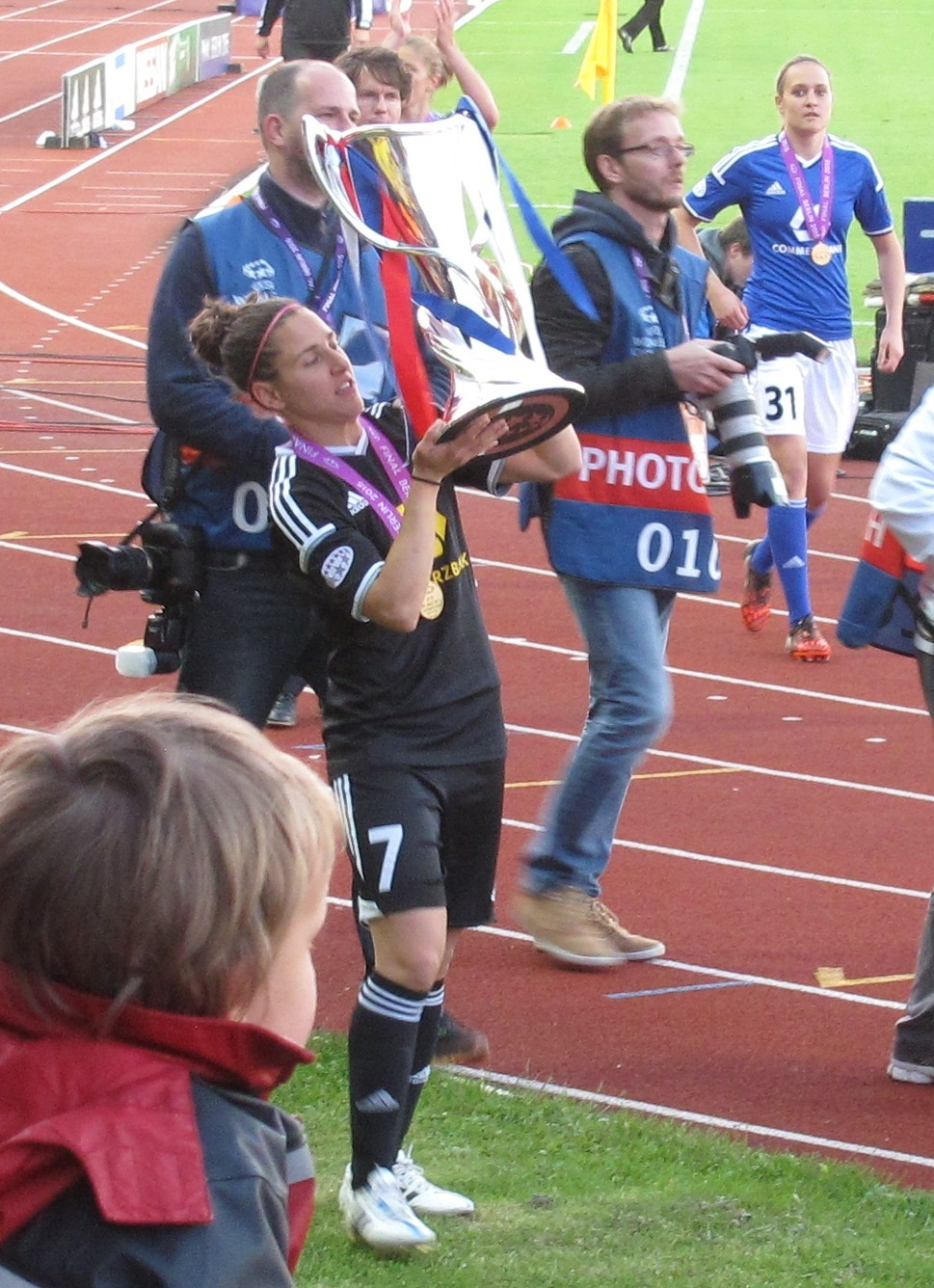
Verónica Boquete lifts the trophy after the match.

Frankfurt dominated the match early on, having two opportunities to score within the first ten minutes. While the German side had more possession over the course of the first half, further chances were scarce until Kerstin Garefrekes served a ball to Célia Šašić on the wide post, giving Frankfurt the lead in the 32nd minute. The goal seemed to wake up the PSG players, who now became more active themselves. A corner kick in the 40th minute was delivered short to Kenza Dali, who crossed the ball high into the box, where Marie-Laure Delie headed it into the net.

The second half started like the first, with Frankfurt controlling the match. It was until the 66th minute that PSG were able to create their first chance, when Laura Georges headed the ball wide. Frankfurt urged for the decisive goal before extra time, having two good chances through Simone Laudehr (81') and Mandy Islacker (87'). The latter got a second chance two minutes into injury time and scored after capturing the ball in the box. PSG started one last charge in the closing stages of the match, creating a chance for Shirley Cruz Traña (90+4'), who missed, winning Frankfurt their record fourth title.

=== Details ===
14 May 2015
18:00 CEST

Frankfurt (Germany)	2–1	(France) Paris Saint-Germain
Šašić 32'; Islacker 90+2'	Report	Delie 40'

Friedrich-Ludwig-Jahn-Sportpark, Berlin
Attendance: 17,147
Referee: Esther Staubli (Switzerland)

1. FFC Frankfurt	Paris Saint-Germain

GK	1	(Germany) Desirée Schumann
SW	4	(Germany) Kathrin Hendrich
CB	13	(Germany) Marith Prießen
CB	27	(Germany) Peggy Kuznik
RWB	23	(Germany) Bianca Schmidt		(substituted off) 79'
LWB	11	(Germany) Simone Laudehr	(yellow card) 44'	(substituted off) 87'
CM	7	(Spain) Verónica Boquete
CM	10	(Germany) Dzsenifer Marozsán
CM	18	(Germany) Kerstin Garefrekes (c)
SS	21	(Switzerland) Ana-Maria Crnogorčević		(substituted off) 66'
CF	9	(Germany) Célia Šašić
Substitutions:
GK	30	(Germany) Anne-Kathrine Kremer
GK	31	(Germany) Anke Preuß
DF	3	(Germany) Laura Störzel
DF	25	(Germany) Saskia Bartusiak
FW	14	(Japan) Kozue Ando		(substituted on) 87'
FW	15	(Germany) Svenja Huth		(substituted on) 79'
FW	17	(Germany) Mandy Islacker		(substituted on) 66'
Manager:
(England) Colin Bell

GK	1	(Poland) Katarzyna Kiedrzynek
RB	11	(France) Jessica Houara
CB	5	(France) Sabrina Delannoy (c)	(yellow card) 74'
CB	13	(Germany) Annike Krahn	(yellow card) 84'
LB	3	(France) Laure Boulleau		(substituted off) 60'
CM	17	(France) Aurélie Kaci
CM	2	(France) Kenza Dali
CM	28	(Costa Rica) Shirley Cruz Traña
AM	19	(Germany) Fatmire Alushi		(substituted off) 58'
CF	9	(Sweden) Kosovare Asllani		(substituted off) 90+5'
CF	18	(France) Marie-Laure Delie
Substitutions:
GK	30	(Germany) Ann-Katrin Berger
DF	4	(France) Laura Georges		(substituted on) 58'
DF	22	(Germany) Josephine Henning		(substituted on) 60'
DF	23	(Italy) Sara Gama
MF	10	(Germany) Linda Bresonik
MF	29	(Morocco) Anissa Lahmari
FW	15	(France) Ouleymata Sarr		(substituted on) 90+5'
Manager:
Farid Benstiti

Assistant referees:
Belinda Brem (Switzerland)
Susanne Küng (Switzerland)
Fourth official:
Désirée Grundbacher (Switzerland)
Reserve assistant referee:
Emilie Aubry (Switzerland)

Match rules

- 90 minutes.
- 30 minutes of extra time if necessary.
- Penalty shoot-out if scores still level.
- Seven named substitutes, of which up to three may be used.

=== Statistics ===
Statistic	FFC Francfort	Paris Saint-Germain
Goals scored	2	1
Total shots	17	7
Shots on target	10	4
Saves	4	1
Ball possession	49	51
Corner kicks	6	6
Fouls committed	7	10
Offsides	2	0
Yellow cards	1	2
Red cards	0	0
