= Marozsán =

Marozsán is a Hungarian surname. Notable people with the surname include:

- Dzsenifer Marozsán (born 1992), Hungarian-born German footballer
- Erika Marozsán (born 1972), Hungarian actress
- Fábián Marozsán (born 1999), Hungarian tennis player
- János Marozsán (born 1965), Hungarian footballer
