= Anne-Kathrine Kremer =

German football manager and player (born 1987)

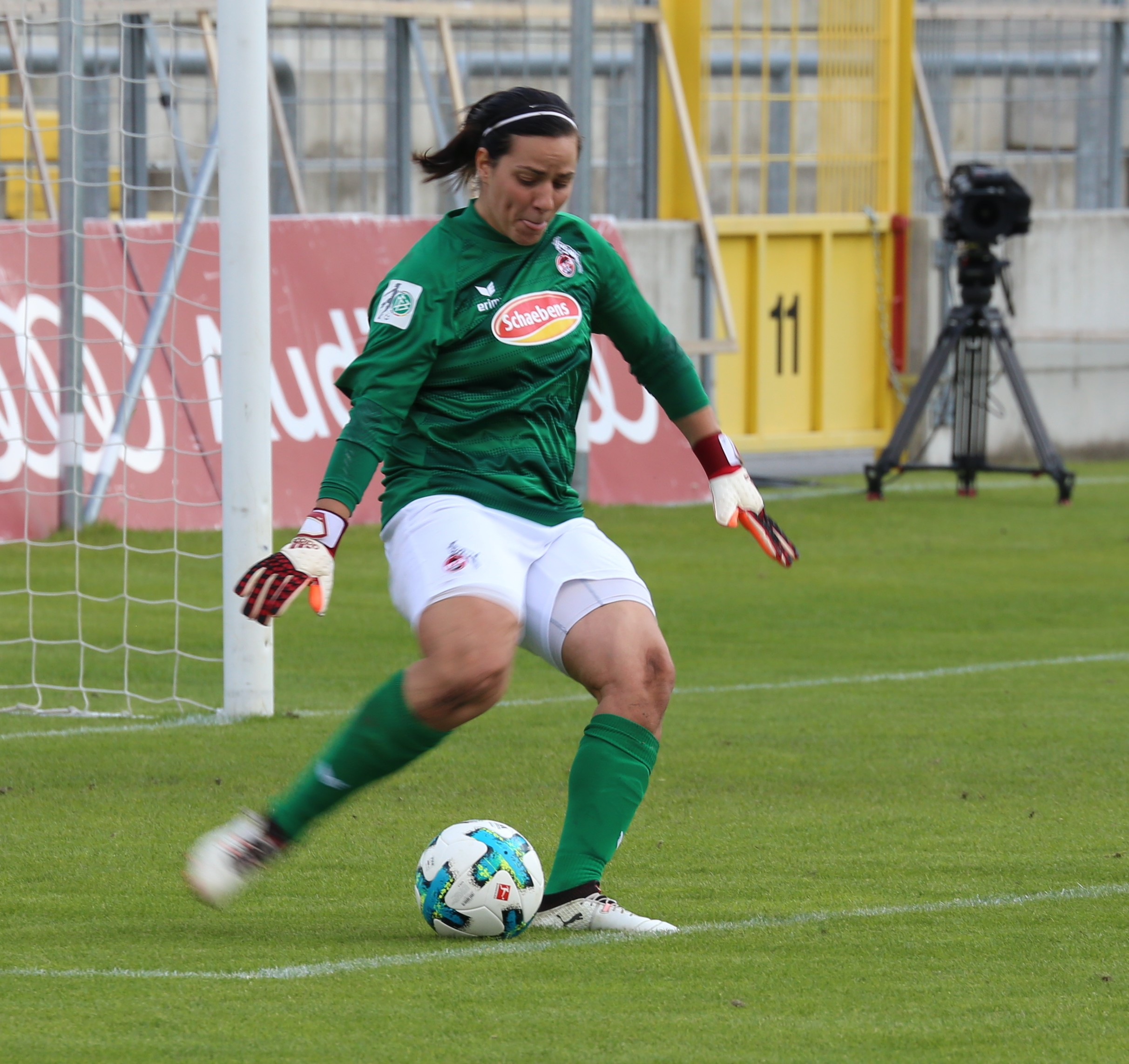

Personal information
- Date of birth: 30 December 1987 (age 38)
- Height: 1.75 m (5 ft 9 in)
- Position: Goalkeeper

Anne-Kathrine Kremer (born 30 December 1987) is a German football manager and former goalkeeper for 1. FFC Frankfurt.

== Honours ==
1. FFC Frankfurt

- UEFA Women's Champions League: 2014–15
