= Nikoleta Nikolić =

Serbian footballer (born 1992)

Personal information
- Date of birth: 11 January 1992 (age 34)
- Position: Defender

Team information
- Current team: Panathinaikos F.C.
- Number: 31

Senior career*
Years	Team	Apps	(Gls)
2009–2012	Mašinac Niš		
2012–2014	Spartak Subotica		
2014–2015	BIIK Kazygurt		
2015–2017	Medyk Konin		
2017	Pomurje		
2017–2018	Red Star Belgrade		
2018–2019	SFK 2000 Sarajevo		
2021–2022	FC Gintra	3	(2)
2022	Ryazan-VDV	6	(0)
2022–2023	Borac Banja Luka	10	(0)
2023–2024	Fatih Vatan	9	(0)
2025	ALG Spor	2	(0)
2025–	Panathinaikos	6	(0)

International career^{‡}
2009–2011	Serbia U19	7	(0)
2013–	Serbia	14	(0)
- * Club domestic league appearances and goals as of 27 December 2025 ‡ National team caps and goals as of 19:49, 30 August 2019 (UTC)

Nikoleta Nikolić (Serbian Cyrillic: Николета Николић; born 11 January 1992) is a Serbian footballer who plays as a defender for Greek A Division club Panathinaikos and the Serbia women's national team.

== Club career ==
Nikolić played in her country for ŽFK Mašinac PZP Niš between 2009 and 2012 in the Serbian Women's Super League.

In July 2012, she transferred to ŽFK Spartak Subotica. She participated at the 2013–14 UEFA Women's Champions League.

She moved to Kazakhstan in July 2014, and joined BIIK Kazygurt. She played at the 2014–15 UEFA Women's Champions League knockout phase.

In early 2015, she transferred to KKPK Medyk Konin in Poland. 2015–16 UEFA Women's Champions League.

In the 2018–19 season, she was part of the SFK 2000 Sarajevo in Bosnia and Herzegovina, and played at the 2018–19 UEFA Women's Champions League.

In August 2021, she went to Lithuania, and joined FC Gintra. She took part at the 2021–22 UEFA Women's Champions League.

Nikolić transferred to Ryazan-VDV in Russia in February 2022.

In August the same year, she joined ŽFK Borac Banja Luka in Bosnia and Herzegovina.

End August 2023, she moved to Turkey and signed a deal with Fatih Vatan S.K. to play in the 2023–24 Super League.

== International career ==
Nikolić has been capped for the Serbia national team, appearing for the team during the 2019 FIFA Women's World Cup qualifying cycle.

== Honours ==
Medyk Konin

- Ekstraliga: 2014–15, 2015–16
- Polish Cup: 2014–15, 2015–16
