= Anke Preuß =

German footballer (born 1992)

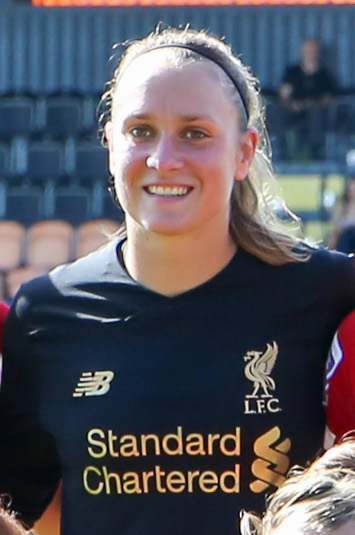
- Preuß in 2019

Personal information
- Date of birth: 22 September 1992 (age 34)
- Place of birth: Ratingen, Germany
- Height: 1.73 m (5 ft 8 in)
- Position: Goalkeeper

Team information
- Current team: SV Meppen

Youth career
- Rot-Weiß Lintorf
- –2006: Lohausener SV
- 2006–2008: FCR 2001 Duisburg

Senior career*
Years	Team	Apps	(Gls)
2008–2012	FCR 2001 Duisburg	7	(0)
2008–2012	FCR 2001 Duisburg II	44	(0)
2012–2013	TSG 1899 Hoffenheim	16	(0)
2013–2016	1. FFC Frankfurt	15	(0)
2013–2016	1. FFC Frankfurt II	6	(0)
2016	AGSM Verona Calcio	1	(0)
2017–2018	Sunderland	9	(0)
2018–2020	Liverpool	23	(0)
2020	Vittsjö GIK	4	(0)
2021	Selfoss	0	(0)
2021–	SV Meppen		

International career
2008	Germany U16	2	(0)
2012	Germany U20	1	(0)
- * Club domestic league appearances and goals as of 30 July 2020

Anke Preuß (German pronunciation: [ˈaŋkə ˈpʁɔʏs]; born 22 September 1992) is a German footballer who plays as a goalkeeper for SV Meppen. She previously played for FCR 2001 Duisburg, TSG 1899 Hoffenheim, 1. FFC Frankfurt, AGSM Verona Calcio, Sunderland and Liverpool.

== Club career ==
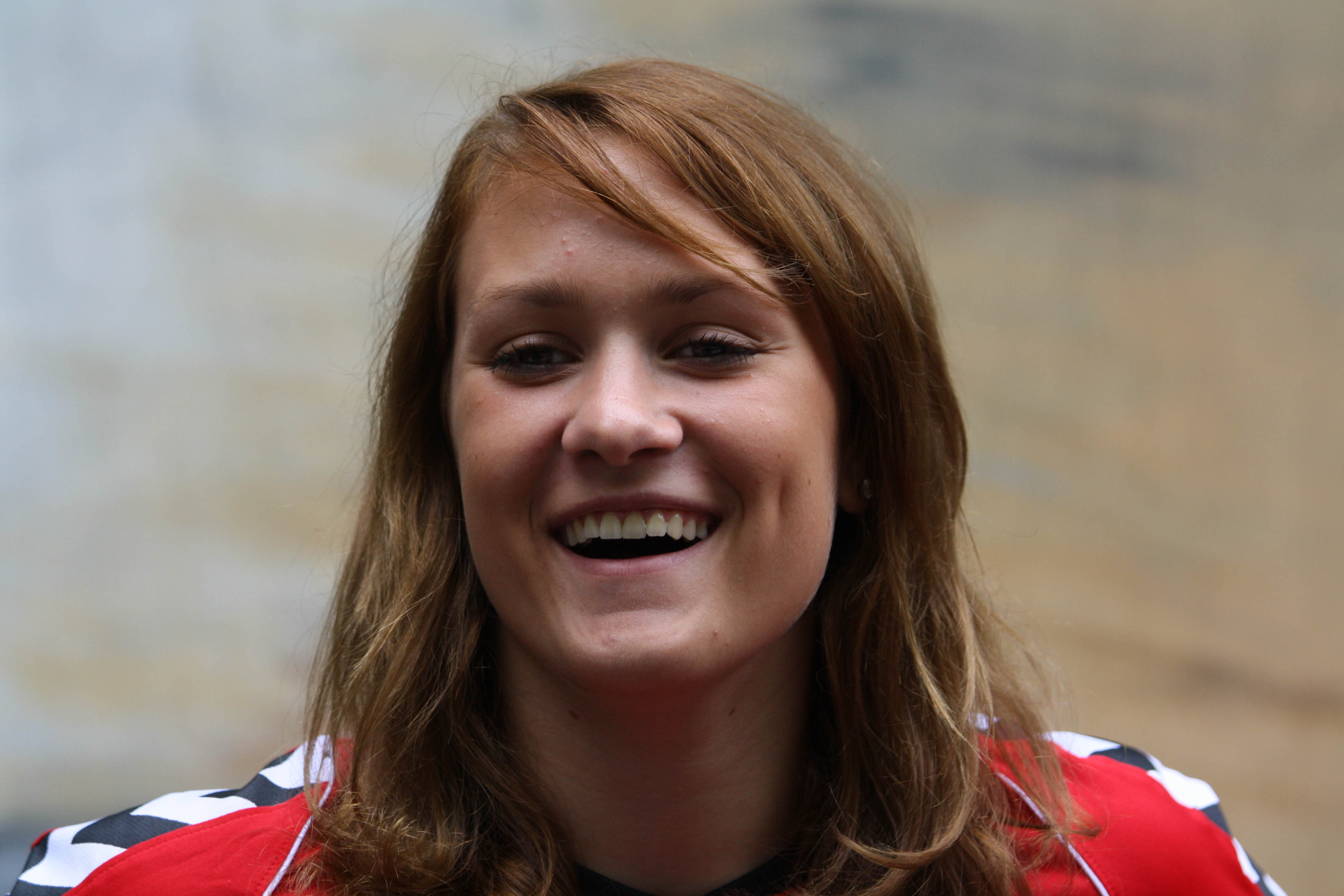
Preuß in 2011

=== Hoffenheim (2012–2013) ===
On 10 May 2012, Preuß signed with TSG 1899 Hoffenheim. She made a total of 19 appearances in all competitions.

=== Frankfurt (2013–2016) ===
On 11 July 2013, Preuß left Hoffenheim and signed a two-year contract with 1. FFC Frankfurt.

=== Verona (2016) ===
On 28 July 2016, Preuß signed with AGSM Verona Calcio. She only made one appearance for the club, in a 3–1 away win over Jesina on 1 October.

=== Sunderland (2017–2018) ===
On 14 February 2017, Preuß joined Sunderland. On 19 March 2017, she made her debut in a 3–2 home victory against Aston Villa in the fifth round of the 2016–17 FA Women's Cup.

=== Liverpool (2018–2020) ===
On 10 July 2018, Preuß signed with Liverpool and was given the number 1 shirt.

She left the club at the end of the 2019—2020 season, having made 31 appearances, after the Merseyside club was relegated to the Women's Championship.

== International career ==
Preuß was part of the under-20 team that finished in second place at the 2012 FIFA U-20 Women's World Cup.

== Honours ==
1899 Hoffenheim

- 2. Frauen-Bundesliga: 2012–13

1. FFC Frankfurt

- DFB-Pokal: 2013–14
- UEFA Women's Champions League: 2014–15
