= Dzsenifer Marozsán =

German footballer (born 1992)

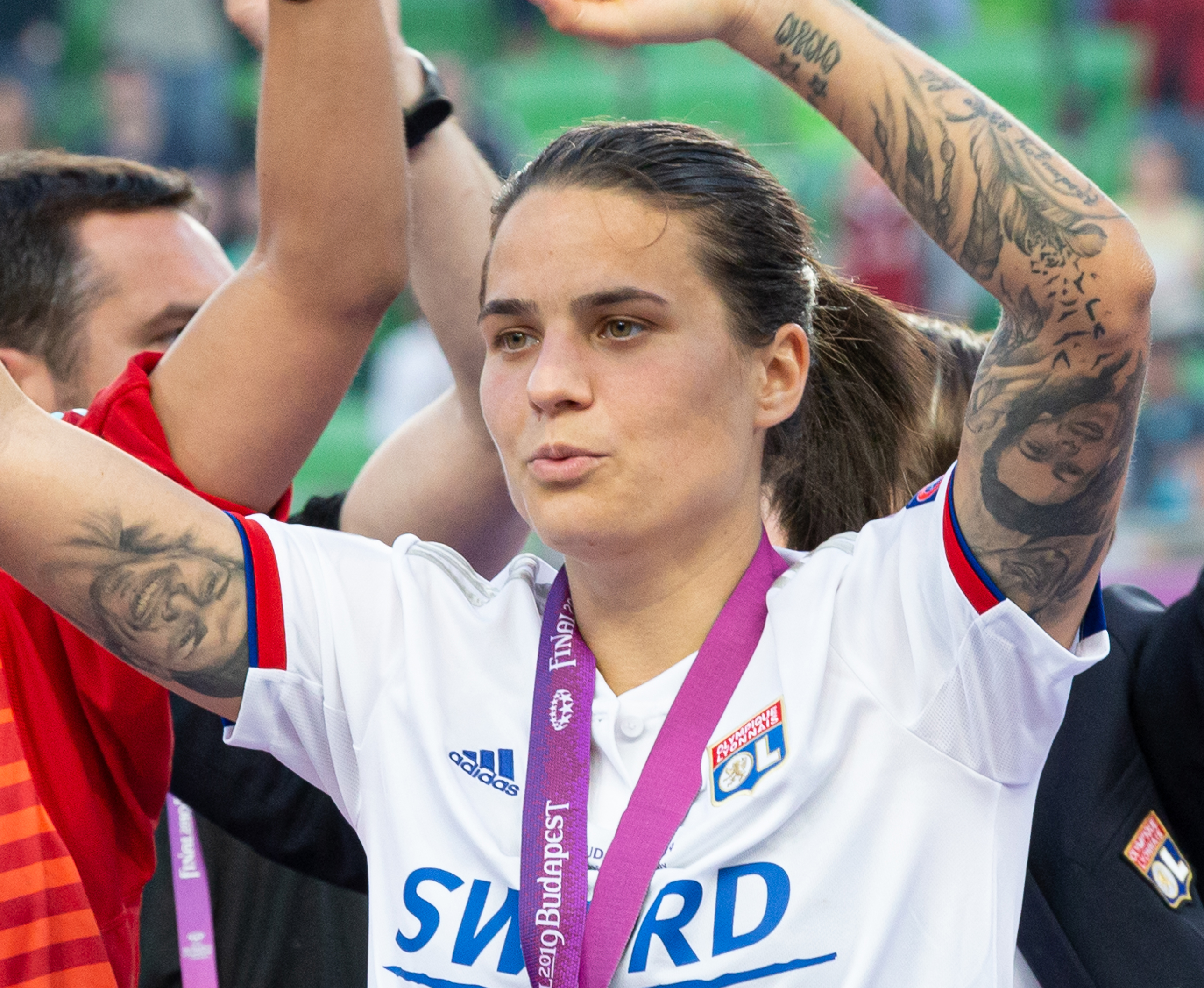
- Marozsán in 2019

Personal information
- Full name: Dzsenifer Marozsán
- Date of birth: 18 April 1992 (age 34)
- Place of birth: Budapest, Hungary
- Height: 1.71 m (5 ft 7 in)
- Position: Midfielder

Youth career
- 1996–2003: DJK Burbach
- 2003–2007: 1. FC Saarbrücken

Senior career*
Years	Team	Apps	(Gls)
2007–2009	1. FC Saarbrücken	38	(13)
2009–2016	1. FFC Frankfurt	133	(40)
2016–2025	Lyon	150	(42)
2021	→ OL Reign (loan)	20	(0)
2025–2026	Al Qadsiah	14	(4)

International career
2004–2007	Germany U15	12	(13)
2007–2008	Germany U17	21	(21)
2009–2012	Germany U19	12	(13)
2009–2012	Germany U20	17	(6)
2010–2023	Germany	112	(33)
Medal record
Women's football
Representing Germany
Olympic Games
Gold medal – first place	2016 Rio de Janeiro	Team
UEFA Women's Championship
Gold medal – first place	2013 Sweden
- * Club domestic league appearances and goals as of 22 April 2023

Dzsenifer Marozsán (Hungarian pronunciation: [ˈd͡ʒɛnifɛr ˈmɒroʒaːn]; born 18 April 1992) is a former professional footballer who played as a midfielder. She played for 1. FC Saarbrücken and 1. FFC Frankfurt in the German Frauen Bundesliga, Lyon in the French Première Ligue, and Saudi club Al Qadsiah in the Saudi Women's Premier League. Born in Hungary, she played for the Germany national team.

In 2015, her cross to Mandy Islacker in stoppage time resulted in a UEFA Women's Champions League win for 1. FFC Frankfurt. She went on to spend nine years with Lyon, where she won multiple league titles, domestic cups, and five Champions League trophies.

At the 2016 Olympics in Rio de Janeiro, Marozsán led unified Germany to its first-ever Olympic gold medal in football, four decades after the East German men won in 1976. She scored the game-winning goal during the UEFA Women's Euro 2013 semifinal against Sweden helping Germany win the title.

== Early life ==
Born in Budapest, Hungary, Marozsán moved with her family to Germany in 1996 when she was four years old, after her father János Marozsán, a four-time Hungarian football national, had signed a contract with 1. FC Saarbrücken. She began her career at DJK Burbach, where she played for a boys' team. She then joined the youth department of 1. FC Saarbrücken. The DFB pushed for naturalizing her so she could play for Germany. In fact her whole family was naturalized, because she was still under-aged.

== Club career ==
=== 1. FC Saarbrücken ===
In 2007 at the age of 14 years and 7 months, Marozsán became the youngest player to play in the German Bundesliga when she made her debut for 1. FC Saarbrücken. She also holds the record as the Bundesliga's youngest goal scorer at 15 years and 4 months.

=== 1. FFC Frankfurt ===
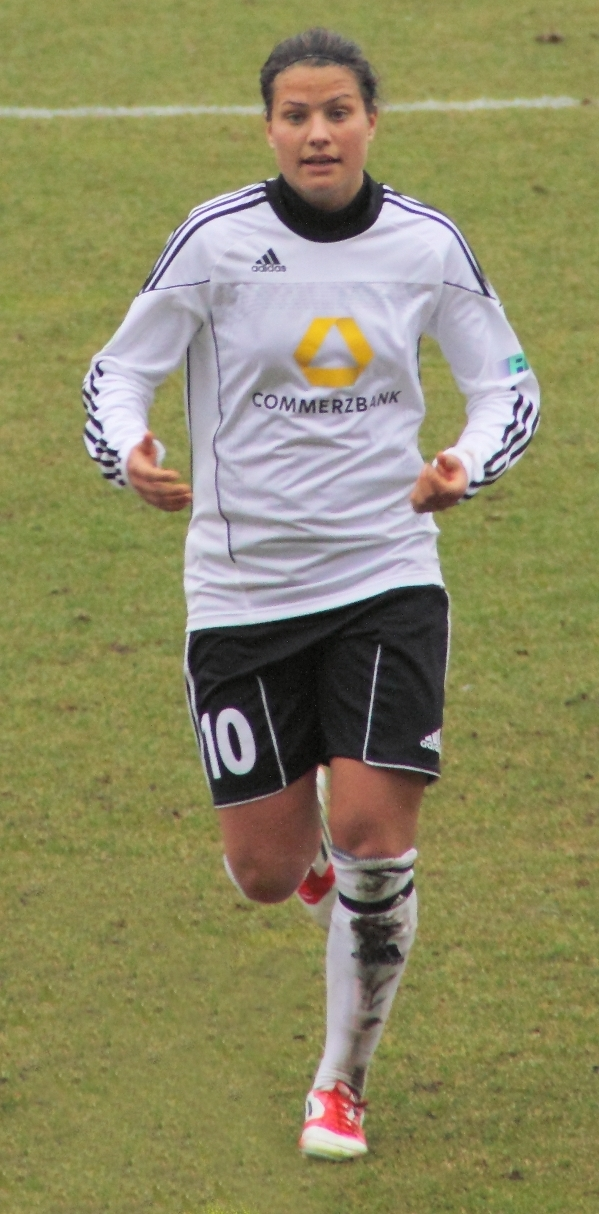
Marozsán playing for Frankfurt in 2012

Marozsán signed with 1. FFC Frankfurt in 2009. During her time with the club, Frankfurt managed two second-place finishes, coming in the 2010–11 and 2013–14 seasons.

She reached her first ever UWCL final in 2012, where Frankfurt were defeated 2–0 by her future club, Lyon. During the 2014–2015 season, she played and scored in each knockout round of the UWCL on the road to the final. In the final against PSG, she played all ninety minutes and sent in the assist to substitute Mandy Islacker that won them the match in extra time. With this win, she earned her first UWCL title and Frankfurt's fourth. She ended up as top assister of the tournament with 8 assists and was named to the team of the tournament by UEFA.

In her final season with Frankfurt, they finished third in the Bundesliga table, disqualifying them from UWCL competition for the coming season.

=== Lyon ===
Marozsán signed with French side Lyon from 1. FFC Frankfurt ahead of the 2016–17 season.

In 2017, Marozsán won the UNFP Trophy for Best Player in D1 Féminine, making it the third consecutive year that a Lyon player had received the award. Previous winners were Eugénie Le Sommer (2015) and Amel Majri (2016).

On 13 May 2018, Marozsán was named the UNFP D1 Féminine Player of the Year for the second consecutive season.

On 19 May 2019, Marozsán was named D1 Féminine Player of the Year for the third consecutive season. She won both the UEFA Women's Champions League and the domestic double (Division 1 Féminine and Coupe de France) during the 2018–2019 season.

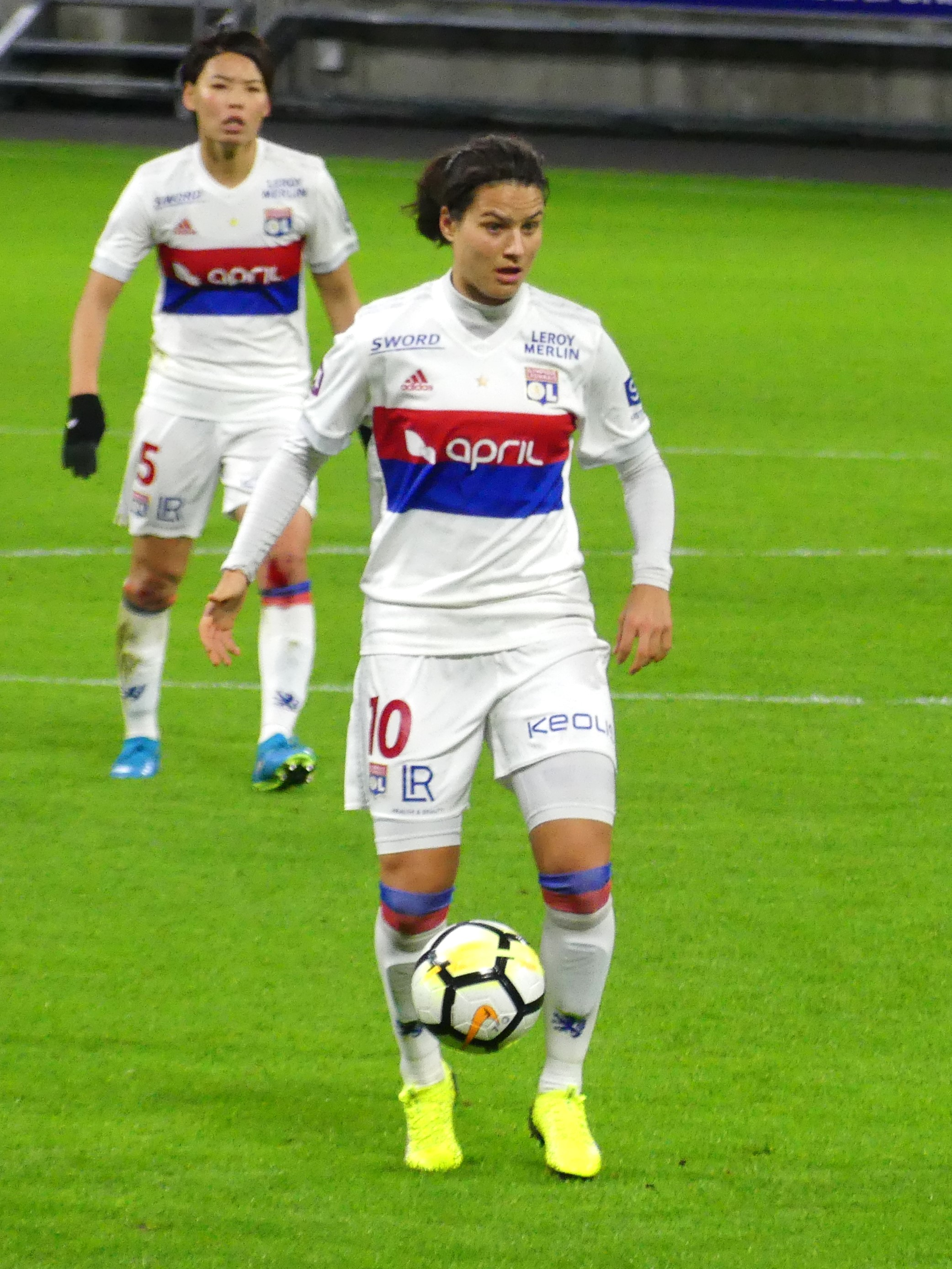
Marozsán during Olympique Lyonnais match against Paris Saint-Germain in the league on 11 December 2017.

On 22 June 2020, Marozsán extended her contract with Olympique Lyonnais until 2023. Despite previously considering a move away from Lyon and potentially joining Utah Royals FC, Marozsán ultimately decided to stay with the club. The COVID-19 pandemic and the subsequent suspension of the U.S. league season influenced her decision.

On 19 April 2021, Olympique Lyonnais announced that Marozsán, alongside goalkeeper Sarah Bouhaddi, was loaned to their American franchise, OL Reign. The loan began on 5 June 2021, and lasted until 31 December 2021.

On 12 April 2022, she suffered a right knee ACL rupture, which ruled her out of 2022 UWCL Final and UEFA Women's Euro 2022.

In 2023, she extended her contract with Lyon until June 2025.

In March 2024, Marozsán was named the German Football Ambassador of 2023. Marozsán won the public vote, surpassing Mélanie Leupolz. The award was presented to her during a public training session at the Groupama OL Training Center, where she received the trophy from Roland Bischof, president of the German Football Ambassador association. She succeeded Ilkay Gündogan as the recipient of this honor.

On 1 April 2024, Marozsán played her 200th match for Olympique Lyonnais during a 3–0 victory against Le Havre.

=== Al-Qadsiah and retirement ===
In August 2025, Marozsán signed for Saudi Women's Premier League side Al Qadsiah. On 7 July 2026, Marozsán announced her retirement from professional footballer.

== International career ==
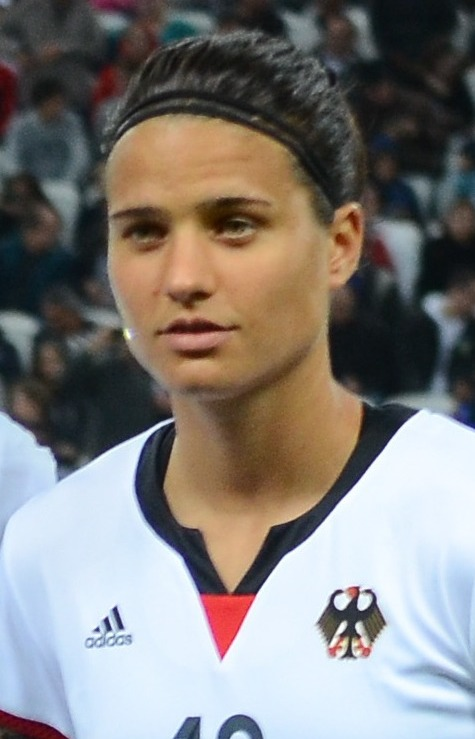
Marozsán in 2016

Marozsán made her debut for the senior national team on 28 October 2010 in a match against Australia. Her first goal for the senior national team came on 15 February 2012 in a match against Turkey.

In 2013, Germany coach Silvia Neid named her to the Germany squad for the 2013 UEFA Women's Euro competition. In the semifinal of the tournament, she scored a goal versus Sweden, a weak shot from outside the box that slowly found its way to the back of the net. The goal was enough to send them to the final against Norway, where she started the match behind striker Célia Okoyino da Mbabi. Germany won the final thanks to two Nadine Angerer penalty saves and a close-range Anja Mittag shot, giving Marozsán her first major international title. Marozsán was named to the UEFA team of the tournament for her performances throughout the competition.

She scored the deciding goal in the 2016 Olympic Final, leading Germany to their first-ever women's football Olympic gold medal.

She was named captain of the German team on 21 October 2016.

On 22 September 2020, Marozsán played her 100th match for Germany in a 3–0 win against Montenegro during the UEFA Women's Euro 2021 qualifying.

In March 2023, she announced her retirement from international football.

== Career statistics ==
Appearances and goals by national team and year
National team	Year	Apps	Goals
Germany	2010	2	0
Germany	2011	1	0
Germany	2012	6	5
Germany	2013	20	9
Germany	2014	13	6
Germany	2015	12	6
Germany	2016	15	4
Germany	2017	12	2
Germany	2018	5	0
Germany	2019	11	0
Germany	2020	5	1
Germany	2021	7	0
Germany	2022	2	0
Germany	2023	1	0
Total		112	33

Scores and results list Germany's goal tally first, score column indicates score after each Marozsán goal.

List of international goals scored by Dzsenifer Marozsán
No.	Date	Venue	Opponent	Score	Result	Competition
1	15 February 2012	İzmir, Turkey	Turkey	1–0	5–0	UEFA Women's Euro 2013 qualifying
2	7 March 2012	Faro, Portugal	Japan	1–0	4–3	2012 Algarve Cup
3	31 May 2012	Bielefeld, Germany	Romania	3–0	5–0	UEFA Women's Euro 2013 qualifying
4	24 October 2012	East Hartford, United States	United States	1–1	2–2	Friendly
5	24 October 2012	East Hartford, United States	United States	2–2	2–2	Friendly
6	8 March 2013	Parchal, Portugal	Japan	2–1	2–1	2013 Algarve Cup
7	24 July 2013	Gothenburg, Sweden	Sweden	1–0	1–0	UEFA Women's Euro 2013
8	21 September 2013	Cottbus, Germany	Russia	3–0	9–0	2015 FIFA Women's World Cup qualification
9	21 September 2013	Cottbus, Germany	Russia	4–0	9–0	2015 FIFA Women's World Cup qualification
10	23 November 2013	Žilina, Slovakia	Slovakia	6–0	6–0	2015 FIFA Women's World Cup qualification
11	27 November 2013	Osijek, Croatia	Croatia	1–0	8–0	2015 FIFA Women's World Cup qualification
12	27 November 2013	Osijek, Croatia	Croatia	3–0	8–0	2015 FIFA Women's World Cup qualification
13	27 November 2013	Osijek, Croatia	Croatia	5–0	8–0	2015 FIFA Women's World Cup qualification
14	27 November 2013	Osijek, Croatia	Croatia	7–0	8–0	2015 FIFA Women's World Cup qualification
15	5 March 2014	Albufeira, Portugal	Iceland	1–0	5–0	2014 Algarve Cup
16	5 March 2014	Albufeira, Portugal	Iceland	2–0	5–0	2014 Algarve Cup
17	10 March 2014	Albufeira, Portugal	Norway	1–1	3–1	2014 Algarve Cup
18	12 March 2014	Faro, Portugal	Japan	3–0	3–0	2014 Algarve Cup
19	8 May 2014	Osnabrück, Germany	Slovakia	5–0	9–1	2015 FIFA Women's World Cup qualification
20	29 October 2014	Örebro, Sweden	Sweden	1–1	2–1	Friendly
21	4 March 2015	Vila Real de Santo António, Portugal	Sweden	1–0	2–4	2015 Algarve Cup
22	9 March 2015	Parchal, Portugal	Brazil	2–1	3–1	2015 Algarve Cup
23	8 April 2015	Fürth, Germany	Brazil	4–0	4–0	Friendly
24	27 May 2015	Baden, Switzerland	Switzerland	2–1	3–1	Friendly
25	27 May 2015	Baden, Switzerland	Switzerland	3–1	3–1	Friendly
26	20 June 2015	Ottawa, Canada	Sweden	4–1	4–1	2015 FIFA Women's World Cup
27	12 April 2016	Osnabrück, Germany	Croatia	1–0	2–0	UEFA Women's Euro 2017 qualifying
28	22 July 2016	Paderborn, Germany	Ghana	2–0	11–0	Friendly
29	22 July 2016	Paderborn, Germany	Ghana	11–0	11–0	Friendly
30	19 August 2016	Rio de Janeiro, Brazil	Sweden	1–0	2–1	2016 Summer Olympics
31	25 July 2017	Utrecht, Netherlands	Russia	2–0	2–0	UEFA Women's Euro 2017
32	16 September 2017	Ingolstadt, Germany	Slovenia	2–0	6–0	2019 FIFA Women's World Cup qualifying
33	19 September 2020	Essen, Germany	Republic of Ireland	2–0	3–0	UEFA Women's Euro 2021 qualifying

== Personal life ==
Marozsán had pulmonary embolism in July 2018. Three months later, she returned to playing football. Her father János Marozsán was also a footballer, he played in the Hungary national football team as a midfielder four times in 1990–91.

== Honours ==
1. FC Saarbrücken

- 2. Bundesliga: 2008–09
- German Cup runner-up: 2007–08

FFC Frankfurt

- UEFA Women's Champions League: 2014–15; runner-up: 2011–12
- DFB Pokal: 2010–2011, 2013–2014

Lyon

- Division 1 Féminine: 2016–17, 2017–18, 2018–19, 2019–20, 2021–22, 2022–23, 2023–24
- Coupe de France féminine: 2016–17, 2018–19, 2019–20, 2022–23
- UEFA Women's Champions League: 2016–17, 2017–18, 2018–19, 2019–20, 2021–22

Germany

- UEFA Women's Championship: 2013
- Summer Olympic Games gold medal: 2016
- Algarve Cup: 2012, 2014

Germany U20

- FIFA U-20 Women's World Cup: 2010

Germany U17

- UEFA Women's U-17 Championship: 2008

Individual

- FIFA U-17 Women's World Cup Silver Ball: 2008
- FIFA U-17 Women's World Cup Golden Shoe: 2008
- UEFA Women's U-17 Championship top scorer: 2008
- Fritz Walter Medal bronze medal: 2009
- FIFA U-20 Women's World Cup Golden Ball: 2012
- UEFA Women's Championship All-Star Team: 2013
- Algarve Cup Most Valuable Player: 2014
- UEFA Best Women's Player in Europe Award third place: 2015, 2016, 2017
- FIFA Women's World Player of the Year nominee: 2016
- IFFHS World's Best Woman Playmaker: 2016, 2018, 2020
- IFFHS Women's World Team: 2017, 2018, 2019, 2020
- FIFPro: FIFA FIFPro World XI 2016
- UNFP Female Player of the Year: 2016–17, 2017–18, 2018–19
- Division 1 Féminine XI of the Year: 2016–17
- Women's Footballer of the Year in Germany: 2017, 2018, 2019
- UEFA Champions League Midfielder of the Season: 2019–20
- IFFHS World's Best Woman Playmaker of the Decade 2011–2020
- IFFHS UEFA Best Woman Player of the Decade 2011–2020
- IFFHS World's Woman Team of the Decade 2011–2020
- IFFHS UEFA Woman Team of the Decade 2011–2020
