= Kamilė Vaičiulaitytė =

Lithuanian footballer

Personal information
- Date of birth: 18 August 1994 (age 32)
- Height: 1.71 m (5 ft 7 in)
- Position: Forward

International career^{‡}
Years	Team	Apps	(Gls)
- Lithuania
- ‡ National team caps and goals as of 19:43, 30 August 2019 (UTC)

Kamilė Vaičiulaitytė (born 18 August 1994) is a Lithuanian footballer who plays as a forward and has appeared for the Lithuania women's national team.

== Career ==
Vaičiulaitytė has been capped for the Lithuania national team, appearing for the team during the 2019 FIFA Women's World Cup qualifying cycle.
