= 2014–15 UEFA Women's Champions League =

14th edition of the European women's club football championship organized by UEFA

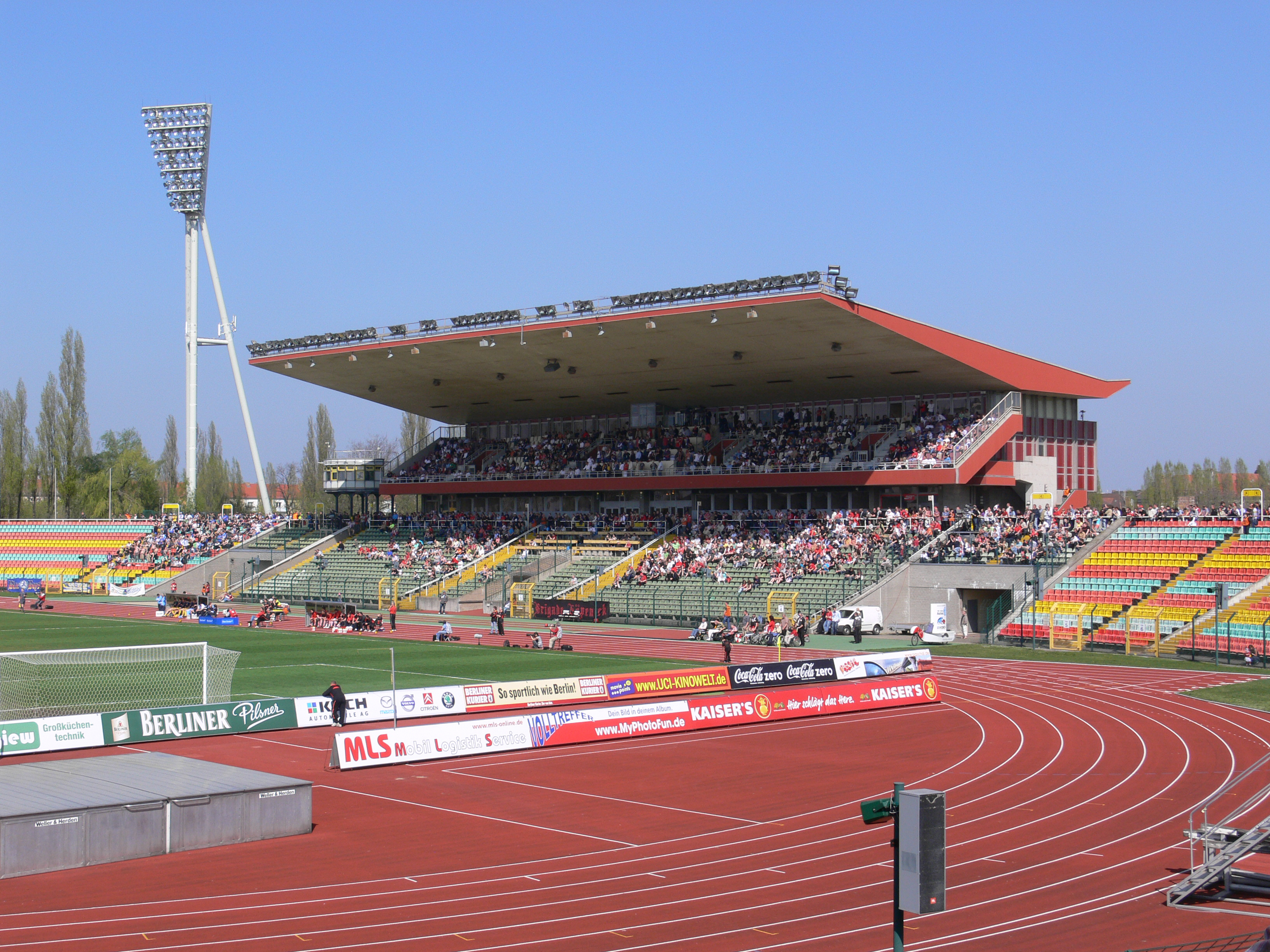
- The Friedrich-Ludwig-Jahn-Sportpark in Berlin hosted the final

Tournament details
- Dates: Qualifying round: 9–14 August 2014; Knockout phase: 8 October 2014 – 14 May 2015 (qualifying)
- Teams: Knockout phase: 32; Total: 54 (from 46 associations)

Final positions
- Champions: (Germany) Frankfurt (4th title)
- Runners-up: (France) Paris Saint-Germain

Tournament statistics
- Matches played: 109
- Goals scored: 437 (4.01 per match)
- Attendance: 150,530 (1,381 per match)
- Top scorer(s): (Germany) Célia Šašić; 14 goals

The 2014–15 UEFA Women's Champions League was the 14th edition of the European women's club football championship organised by UEFA. The final was played on 14 May 2015 at the Friedrich-Ludwig-Jahn-Sportpark, Berlin, Germany. Unlike recent years in which the Women's Champions League final was held in the same week as the men's Champions League final, the two finals were separated by almost a month, as the 2015 FIFA Women's World Cup starts in early June.

German side Frankfurt defeated French side Paris Saint-Germain 2–1 in the final to win a record fourth title.

== Association team allocation ==
A total of 54 teams from 46 UEFA member associations participated in the 2014–15 UEFA Women's Champions League. The ranking based on the UEFA Women's Champions League association coefficient was used to determine the number of participating teams for each association:

- Associations 1–8 each had two teams qualify.
- All other associations, should they enter, each had one team qualify.

Since Wolfsburg, the winners of the 2013–14 UEFA Women's Champions League, already qualified through their domestic league, the title holder entry was not used.

=== Association ranking ===
For the 2014–15 UEFA Women's Champions League, the associations were allocated places according to their 2013 UEFA Women's Champions League association coefficient, which took into account their performance in European competitions from 2008–09 to 2012–13.

The Czech Republic overtook Austria for eighth place in the UEFA coefficient ranking and thus assured themselves a second entry.

| Rank | Association | Coeff. | Teams |
|---|---|---|---|
| 1 | France | 84.500 | 2 |
| 2 | Germany | 83.166 | 2 |
| 3 | Sweden | 58.500 | 2 |
| 4 | Russia | 58.500 | 2 |
| 5 | England | 49.500 | 2 |
| 6 | Italy | 37.000 | 2 |
| 7 | Denmark | 34.500 | 2 |
| 8 | (Czech Republic) Czech Republic | 32.500 | 2 |
| 9 | Norway | 31.000 | 1 |
| 10 | Spain | 28.500 | 1 |
| 11 | Austria | 28.000 | 1 |
| 12 | Iceland | 19.000 | 1 |
| 13 | Kazakhstan | 19.000 | 1 |
| 14 | Netherlands | 17.500 | 1 |
| 15 | Scotland | 17.500 | 1 |
| 16 | Poland | 16.500 | 1 |

| Rank | Association | Coeff. | Teams |
|---|---|---|---|
| 17 | Belgium | 16.000 | 1 |
| 18 | Switzerland | 15.500 | 1 |
| 19 | Romania | 14.000 | 1 |
| 20 | Finland | 13.000 | 1 |
| 21 | Ukraine | 13.000 | 1 |
| 22 | Hungary | 12.500 | 1 |
| 23 | Greece | 12.500 | 1 |
| 24 | Belarus | 12.500 | 1 |
| 25 | Cyprus | 12.500 | 1 |
| 26 | Serbia | 12.000 | 1 |
| 27 | (Bosnia and Herzegovina) Bosnia and Herzegovina | 8.500 | 1 |
| 28 | (Republic of Ireland) Republic of Ireland | 8.500 | 1 |
| 29 | Portugal | 8.500 | 1 |
| 30 | Israel | 8.000 | 1 |
| 31 | Slovakia | 7.500 | 1 |
| 32 | Slovenia | 7.000 | 1 |

| Rank | Association | Coeff. | Teams |
|---|---|---|---|
| 33 | Bulgaria | 6.500 | 1 |
| 34 | (Faroe Islands) Faroe Islands | 5.000 | 1 |
| 35 | Croatia | 4.500 | 1 |
| 36 | Lithuania | 4.500 | 1 |
| 37 | Wales | 3.500 | 1 |
| 38 | (North Macedonia) Macedonia | 3.000 | 1 |
| 39 | Turkey | 3.000 | 1 |
| 40 | (Northern Ireland) Northern Ireland | 2.500 | 1 |
| 41 | Estonia | 2.000 | 1 |
| 42 | Moldova | 0.500 | 1 |
| 43 | Malta | 0.000 | 1 |
| 44 | Latvia | 0.000 | 1 |
| 45 | Montenegro | 0.000 | 1 |
| 46 | Albania | 0.000 | 1 |

Luxembourg (47th), Georgia (48th), Andorra, Armenia, Azerbaijan, Gibraltar, Liechtenstein, and San Marino (all no rank, as association did not enter in the five seasons used for computing coefficients) did not enter.

=== Teams ===
Unlike the men's Champions League, not every association enters a team and so the exact number of teams in each round can not be determined until the full entry list is known. For this season, the champions and runners-up from associations 1–8 and the champions from associations 9–14 enter the round of 32, while the remaining teams enter the qualifying round.

The following list the teams that qualified and entered this season's competition. Here CH denotes the national champion, RU the national runner-up, Ned 1 and Bel 1 the best placed Belgian and Dutch team in their joint league.

Round of 32
| (France) Lyon (CH) | (France) Paris Saint-Germain (RU) | (Germany) Wolfsburg (CH) | (Germany) Frankfurt (RU) |
| (Sweden) Rosengård (CH) | (Sweden) Linköping (3rd) | (Russia) Ryazan VDV (CH) | (Russia) Zvezda Perm (RU) |
| (England) Liverpool (CH) | (England) Bristol Academy (RU) | (Italy) Brescia (CH) | (Italy) Torres (RU) |
| (Denmark) Fortuna Hjørring (CH) | (Denmark) Brøndby (RU) | (Czech Republic) Slavia Praha (CH) | (Czech Republic) Sparta Praha (RU) |
| (Norway) Stabæk (CH) | (Spain) Barcelona (CH) | (Austria) Neulengbach (CH) | (Iceland) Stjarnan (CH) |
| (Kazakhstan) BIIK Kazygurt (CH) | (Netherlands) Twente (Ned 1) | | |
Qualifying round
| (Scotland) Glasgow City (CH) | (Poland) Medyk Konin (CH) | (Belgium) Standard Liège (Bel 1) | (Switzerland) Zürich (CH) |
| (Romania) Olimpia Cluj (CH) | (Finland) Åland United (CH) | (Ukraine) Zhytlobud Kharkiv (CH) | (Hungary) MTK (CH) |
| (Greece) Amazones Dramas (CH) | (Belarus) FC Minsk (CH) | (Cyprus) Apollon Limassol (CH) | (Serbia) Spartak Subotica (CH) |
| (Bosnia and Herzegovina) SFK 2000 (CH) | (Republic of Ireland) Raheny United (CH) | (Portugal) Atlético Ouriense (CH) | (Israel) ASA Tel Aviv (CH) |
| (Slovakia) Nové Zámky (CH) | (Slovenia) Pomurje (CH) | (Bulgaria) NSA Sofia (CH) | (Faroe Islands) KÍ Klaksvík (CH) |
| (Croatia) Osijek (CH) | (Lithuania) Gintra Universitetas (CH) | (Wales) Cardiff Met. (CH) | (North Macedonia) Kočani (CH) |
| (Turkey) Konak Belediyespor (CH) | (Northern Ireland) Glentoran Belfast United (CH) | (Estonia) Pärnu JK (CH) | (Moldova) Goliador Chişinău (CH) |
| (Malta) Hibernians (CH) | (Latvia) Rīgas FS (CH) | (Albania) Vllaznia (CH) | (Montenegro) Ekonomist (CH) |

Faroese club KÍ has entered every past edition. Debutants are Liverpool (ENG), Brescia (ITA), Konin (POL), Amazones Dramas (GRE), FC Minsk (BLR), FC Hibernians (MLT), Rīgas (LAT) and Kočani (MKD).

Sweden (SWE): Tyresö FF, renounced its place as a result of financial difficulties leading to it ceasing to operate. As a result, the berth was awarded to Linköpings FC.

== Round and draw dates ==
UEFA has scheduled the competition as follows. In contrast to previous seasons, quarter-finals and semi-finals were played on weekends.

| Round | Draw | First leg | Second leg |
|---|---|---|---|
| Qualifying round | 26 June 2014 | 9–14 August 2014 | |
| Round of 32 | 22 August 2014 | 8–9 October 2014 | 15–16 October 2014 |
| Round of 16 | 22 August 2014 | 8–9 November 2014 | 12–13 November 2014 |
| Quarter-finals | 19 November 2014 | 21–22 March 2015 | 28–29 March 2015 |
| Semi-finals | 19 November 2014 | 18–19 April 2015 | 25–26 April 2015 |
| Final | 19 November 2014 | 14 May 2015 at Friedrich-Ludwig-Jahn-Sportpark, Berlin | |

== Qualifying round ==
The draw for the qualifying round was held on 26 June 2014. The 32 teams were allocated into four pots based on their 2014 UEFA club coefficients. They were drawn into eight groups of four, with the restriction that each group must contain one of the eight teams which were pre-selected as hosts.

In each group, teams played against each other in a round-robin mini-tournament at the pre-selected hosts. The matchdays were 9, 11 and 14 August 2014. The eight group winners and the two runners-up with the best record against the first and third-placed teams in their group advanced to the round of 32.

=== Group 1 ===
| Pos | Team | Pld | W | D | L | GF | GA | GD | Pts | Qualification | ZÜR | KON | MIN | RIG |
|---|---|---|---|---|---|---|---|---|---|---|---|---|---|---|
| 1 | (Switzerland) Zürich | 3 | 2 | 1 | 0 | 7 | 1 | +6 | 7 | Advance to knockout phase | — | — | 1–1 | 2–0 |
| 2 | (Turkey) Konak Belediyespor | 3 | 2 | 0 | 1 | 13 | 5 | +8 | 6 | | 0–4 | — | — | 11–0 |
| 3 | (Belarus) FC Minsk | 3 | 1 | 1 | 1 | 9 | 3 | +6 | 4 | | — | 1–2 | — | — |
| 4 | (Latvia) Rīgas FS (H) | 3 | 0 | 0 | 3 | 0 | 20 | −20 | 0 | | — | — | 0–7 | — |

Source: UEFA
Rules for classification: Group stage tiebreakers
(H) Hosts

=== Group 2 ===
| Pos | Team | Pld | W | D | L | GF | GA | GD | Pts | Qualification | RAH | CLU | SOF | HIB |
|---|---|---|---|---|---|---|---|---|---|---|---|---|---|---|
| 1 | (Republic of Ireland) Raheny United | 3 | 3 | 0 | 0 | 6 | 2 | +4 | 9 | Advance to knockout phase | — | — | 2–0 | — |
| 2 | (Romania) Olimpia Cluj (H) | 3 | 2 | 0 | 1 | 10 | 3 | +7 | 6 | | 1–2 | — | — | 5–0 |
| 3 | (Bulgaria) NSA Sofia | 3 | 1 | 0 | 2 | 6 | 6 | 0 | 3 | | — | 1–4 | — | 5–0 |
| 4 | (Malta) Hibernians | 3 | 0 | 0 | 3 | 1 | 12 | −11 | 0 | | 1–2 | — | — | — |

Source: UEFA
Rules for classification: Group stage tiebreakers
(H) Hosts

=== Group 3 ===
| Pos | Team | Pld | W | D | L | GF | GA | GD | Pts | Qualification | MTK | POM | PÄR | EKO |
|---|---|---|---|---|---|---|---|---|---|---|---|---|---|---|
| 1 | (Hungary) MTK | 3 | 3 | 0 | 0 | 6 | 1 | +5 | 9 | Advance to knockout phase | — | — | 3–0 | 1–0 |
| 2 | (Slovenia) Pomurje | 3 | 2 | 0 | 1 | 9 | 2 | +7 | 6 | Advance to knockout phase | 1–2 | — | — | 4–0 |
| 3 | (Estonia) Pärnu JK | 3 | 1 | 0 | 2 | 2 | 8 | −6 | 3 | | — | 0–4 | — | — |
| 4 | (Montenegro) Ekonomist (H) | 3 | 0 | 0 | 3 | 1 | 7 | −6 | 0 | | — | — | 1–2 | — |

Source: UEFA
Rules for classification: Group stage tiebreakers
(H) Hosts

=== Group 4 ===
| Pos | Team | Pld | W | D | L | GF | GA | GD | Pts | Qualification | GLA | KHA | BEL | NOV |
|---|---|---|---|---|---|---|---|---|---|---|---|---|---|---|
| 1 | (Scotland) Glasgow City (H) | 3 | 3 | 0 | 0 | 10 | 0 | +10 | 9 | Advance to knockout phase | — | — | 1–0 | 5–0 |
| 2 | (Ukraine) Zhytlobud Kharkiv | 3 | 2 | 0 | 1 | 8 | 5 | +3 | 6 | | 0–4 | — | 5–0 | — |
| 3 | (Northern Ireland) Glentoran Belfast United | 3 | 1 | 0 | 2 | 5 | 8 | −3 | 3 | | — | — | — | 5–2 |
| 4 | (Slovakia) Nové Zámky | 3 | 0 | 0 | 3 | 3 | 13 | −10 | 0 | | — | 1–3 | — | — |

Source: UEFA
Rules for classification: Group stage tiebreakers
(H) Hosts

=== Group 5 ===
| Pos | Team | Pld | W | D | L | GF | GA | GD | Pts | Qualification | OSI | SUB | DRA | CHI |
|---|---|---|---|---|---|---|---|---|---|---|---|---|---|---|
| 1 | (Croatia) Osijek (H) | 3 | 3 | 0 | 0 | 16 | 1 | +15 | 9 | Advance to knockout phase | — | 1–0 | — | 12–0 |
| 2 | (Serbia) Spartak Subotica | 3 | 2 | 0 | 1 | 22 | 1 | +21 | 6 | | — | — | 3–0 | 19–0 |
| 3 | (Greece) Amazones Dramas | 3 | 1 | 0 | 2 | 12 | 6 | +6 | 3 | | 1–3 | — | — | — |
| 4 | (Moldova) Goliador Chișinău | 3 | 0 | 0 | 3 | 0 | 42 | −42 | 0 | | — | — | 0–11 | — |

Source: UEFA
Rules for classification: Group stage tiebreakers
(H) Hosts

=== Group 6 ===
| Pos | Team | Pld | W | D | L | GF | GA | GD | Pts | Qualification | APO | UNI | VLL | KÍK |
|---|---|---|---|---|---|---|---|---|---|---|---|---|---|---|
| 1 | (Cyprus) Apollon Limassol | 3 | 2 | 1 | 0 | 6 | 2 | +4 | 7 | Advance to knockout phase | — | 3–1 | 0–0 | — |
| 2 | (Lithuania) Gintra Universitetas (H) | 3 | 2 | 0 | 1 | 8 | 3 | +5 | 6 | Advance to knockout phase | — | — | — | 2–0 |
| 3 | (Albania) Vllaznia | 3 | 1 | 1 | 1 | 2 | 6 | −4 | 4 | | — | 0–5 | — | — |
| 4 | (Faroe Islands) KÍ Klaksvík | 3 | 0 | 0 | 3 | 2 | 7 | −5 | 0 | | 1–3 | — | 1–2 | — |

Source: UEFA
Rules for classification: Group stage tiebreakers
(H) Hosts

=== Group 7 ===
| Pos | Team | Pld | W | D | L | GF | GA | GD | Pts | Qualification | KON | SFK | ÅLA | KOČ |
|---|---|---|---|---|---|---|---|---|---|---|---|---|---|---|
| 1 | (Poland) Medyk Konin | 3 | 3 | 0 | 0 | 21 | 1 | +20 | 9 | Advance to knockout phase | — | — | 7–0 | — |
| 2 | (Bosnia and Herzegovina) SFK 2000 (H) | 3 | 2 | 0 | 1 | 8 | 3 | +5 | 6 | | 0–3 | — | — | 7–0 |
| 3 | (Finland) Åland United | 3 | 1 | 0 | 2 | 4 | 8 | −4 | 3 | | — | 0–1 | — | 4–0 |
| 4 | (North Macedonia) Kočani | 3 | 0 | 0 | 3 | 1 | 22 | −21 | 0 | | 1–11 | — | — | — |

Source: UEFA
Rules for classification: Group stage tiebreakers
(H) Hosts

=== Group 8 ===
| Pos | Team | Pld | W | D | L | GF | GA | GD | Pts | Qualification | OUR | LIE | TEL | CAR |
|---|---|---|---|---|---|---|---|---|---|---|---|---|---|---|
| 1 | (Portugal) Atlético Ouriense (H) | 3 | 2 | 0 | 1 | 4 | 3 | +1 | 6 | Advance to knockout phase | — | — | 2–1 | — |
| 2 | (Belgium) Standard Liège | 3 | 2 | 0 | 1 | 11 | 1 | +10 | 6 | | 0–1 | — | — | 10–0 |
| 3 | (Israel) ASA Tel Aviv | 3 | 1 | 0 | 2 | 3 | 3 | 0 | 3 | | — | 0–1 | — | 2–0 |
| 4 | (Wales) Cardiff Met. | 3 | 1 | 0 | 2 | 2 | 13 | −11 | 3 | | 2–1 | — | — | — |

Source: UEFA
Rules for classification: Group stage tiebreakers
(H) Hosts

=== Ranking of second-placed teams ===
To determine the two best second-placed teams from the qualifying round which advanced to the round of 32, only the results of the second-placed teams against the first and third-placed teams in their group are taken into account.

| Pos | Grp | Team | Pld | W | D | L | GF | GA | GD | Pts | Qualification |
|---|---|---|---|---|---|---|---|---|---|---|---|
| 1 | 6 | (Lithuania) Gintra Universitetas | 2 | 1 | 0 | 1 | 6 | 3 | +3 | 3 | Advance to knockout phase |
| 2 | 3 | (Slovenia) Pomurje | 2 | 1 | 0 | 1 | 5 | 2 | +3 | 3 | Advance to knockout phase |
| 3 | 2 | (Romania) Olimpia Cluj | 2 | 1 | 0 | 1 | 5 | 3 | +2 | 3 | |
| 4 | 5 | (Serbia) Spartak Subotica | 2 | 1 | 0 | 1 | 3 | 1 | +2 | 3 | |
| 5 | 4 | (Ukraine) Zhytlobud Kharkiv | 2 | 1 | 0 | 1 | 5 | 4 | +1 | 3 | |
| 6 | 8 | (Belgium) Standard Liège | 2 | 1 | 0 | 1 | 1 | 1 | 0 | 3 | |
| 7 | 7 | (Bosnia and Herzegovina) SFK 2000 | 2 | 1 | 0 | 1 | 1 | 3 | −2 | 3 | |
| 8 | 1 | (Turkey) Konak Belediyespor | 2 | 1 | 0 | 1 | 2 | 5 | −3 | 3 | |

Source: UEFA
Rules for classification: 1) points; 2) goal difference; 3) number of goals scored; 4) club coefficient; 5) disciplinary points; 6) drawing of lots.

== Knockout phase ==
The main round was played as a straight knockout tournament with 32 teams. Each tie is played over two legs with the exception of the final, which is played at a single neutral venue.

=== Bracket ===
Round of 32
(Czech Republic) Slavia Prague | 0 | 0 | 0
(Spain) Barcelona | 1 | 3 | 4
(Republic of Ireland) Raheny United | 0 | 1 | 1
(England) Bristol Academy | 4 | 2 | 6
(Kazakhstan) BIIK Kazygurt | 2 | 0 | 2
(Germany) Frankfurt | 2 | 4 | 6
(Slovenia) Pomurje | 2 | 1 | 3
(Italy) Torres | 4 | 3 | 7
(England) Liverpool | 2 | 0 | 2
(Sweden) Linköping | 1 | 3 | 4
(Iceland) Stjarnan | 2 | 1 | 3
(Russia) Zvezda Perm | 5 | 3 | 8
(Cyprus) Apollon Limassol | 1 | 1 | 2
(Denmark) Brøndby (a.e.t.) | 0 | 3 | 3
(Lithuania) Gintra Universitetas (p) | 1 | 1 | 2
(Czech Republic) Sparta Prague | 1 | 1 | 2
(Hungary) MTK | 1 | 2 | 3
(Austria) Neulengbach (a.e.t.) | 2 | 2 | 4
(Norway) Stabæk | 0 | 1 | 1
(Germany) Wolfsburg | 1 | 2 | 3
(Russia) Ryazan VDV | 1 | 0 | 1
(Sweden) Rosengård | 3 | 2 | 5
(Portugal) Atlético Ouriense | 0 | 0 | 0
(Denmark) Fortuna Hjørring | 3 | 6 | 9
(Croatia) Osijek | 2 | 0 | 2
(Switzerland) Zürich | 5 | 2 | 7
(Poland) Medyk Konin | 2 | 0 | 2
(Scotland) Glasgow City (a.e.t.) | 0 | 3 | 3
(Netherlands) Twente | 1 | 0 | 1
(France) Paris Saint-Germain | 2 | 1 | 3
(Italy) Brescia | 0 | 0 | 0
(France) Lyon | 5 | 9 | 14

Round of 16
(Spain) Barcelona | 0 | 1 | 1
(England) Bristol Academy | 1 | 1 | 2
(Germany) Frankfurt | 5 | 4 | 9
(Italy) Torres | 0 | 0 | 0
(Sweden) Linköping | 5 | 0 | 5
(Russia) Zvezda Perm | 0 | 3 | 3
(Denmark) Brøndby | 5 | 0 | 5
(Lithuania) Gintra Universitetas | 0 | 2 | 2
(Austria) Neulengbach | 0 | 0 | 0
(Germany) Wolfsburg | 4 | 7 | 11
(Sweden) Rosengård | 2 | 2 | 4
(Denmark) Fortuna Hjørring | 1 | 0 | 1
(Switzerland) Zürich | 2 | 2 | 4
(Scotland) Glasgow City | 1 | 4 | 5
(France) Paris Saint-Germain | 1 | 1 | 2
(France) Lyon | 1 | 0 | 1

Quarter-final
(England) Bristol Academy | 0 | 0 | 0
(Germany) Frankfurt | 5 | 7 | 12
(Sweden) Linköping | 0 | 1 | 1
(Denmark) Brøndby | 1 | 1 | 2
(Germany) Wolfsburg (a) | 1 | 3 | 4
(Sweden) Rosengård | 1 | 3 | 4
(Scotland) Glasgow City | 0 | 0 | 0
(France) Paris Saint-Germain | 2 | 5 | 7

Semi-final
(Germany) Frankfurt | 7 | 6 | 13
(Denmark) Brøndby | 0 | 0 | 0
(Germany) Wolfsburg | 0 | 2 | 2
(France) Paris Saint-Germain | 2 | 1 | 3

Final
(Germany) Frankfurt | 2
(France) Paris Saint-Germain | 1

=== Round of 32 ===
The draw for the round of 32 was held on 22 August 2014. Teams from the same association could not be drawn against each other. The first legs were played on 8 and 9 October, and the second legs were played on 15 and 16 October 2014.

The only unseeded team that won a tie was Gintra Universitetas after they beat Sparta Praha in the competition's first penalty shootout since the 2010 final.

| Team 1 | Agg. | Team 2 | 1st leg | 2nd leg |
|---|---|---|---|---|
| Medyk Konin (Poland) | 2–3 | (Scotland) Glasgow City | 2–0 | 0–3 (a.e.t.) |
| Ryazan VDV (Russia) | 1–5 | (Sweden) Rosengård | 1–3 | 0–2 |
| Brescia (Italy) | 0–14 | (France) Lyon | 0–5 | 0–9 |
| Atlético Ouriense (Portugal) | 0–9 | (Denmark) Fortuna Hjørring | 0–3 | 0–6 |
| Slavia Praha (Czech Republic) | 0–4 | (Spain) Barcelona | 0–1 | 0–3 |
| Raheny United (Republic of Ireland) | 1–6 | (England) Bristol Academy | 0–4 | 1–2 |
| BIIK Kazygurt (Kazakhstan) | 2–6 | (Germany) Frankfurt | 2–2 | 0–4 |
| Gintra Universitetas (Lithuania) | 2–2 (5–4 p) | (Czech Republic) Sparta Praha | 1–1 | 1–1 (a.e.t.) |
| Pomurje (Slovenia) | 3–7 | (Italy) Torres | 2–4 | 1–3 |
| Stabæk (Norway) | 1–3 | (Germany) Wolfsburg | 0–1 | 1–2 |
| Apollon Limassol (Cyprus) | 2–3 | (Denmark) Brøndby | 1–0 | 1–3 (a.e.t.) |
| MTK (Hungary) | 3–4 | (Austria) Neulengbach | 1–2 | 2–2 (a.e.t.) |
| Osijek (Croatia) | 2–7 | (Switzerland) Zürich | 2–5 | 0–2 |
| Liverpool (England) | 2–4 | (Sweden) Linköping | 2–1 | 0–3 |
| Twente (Netherlands) | 1–3 | (France) Paris Saint-Germain | 1–2 | 0–1 |
| Stjarnan (Iceland) | 3–8 | (Russia) Zvezda Perm | 2–5 | 1–3 |

=== Round of 16 ===
The round of 16 was drawn together with the round of 32. It was an open draw with no restrictions. The first legs were played on 8 and 9 November, and the second legs were played on 12 and 13 November 2014.

Glasgow became the first Scottish team to advance to the quarter-finals.

| Team 1 | Agg. | Team 2 | 1st leg | 2nd leg |
|---|---|---|---|---|
| Zürich (Switzerland) | 4–5 | (Scotland) Glasgow City | 2–1 | 2–4 |
| Rosengård (Sweden) | 4–1 | (Denmark) Fortuna Hjørring | 2–1 | 2–0 |
| Paris Saint-Germain (France) | 2–1 | (France) Lyon | 1–1 | 1–0 |
| Neulengbach (Austria) | 0–11 | (Germany) Wolfsburg | 0–4 | 0–7 |
| Linköping (Sweden) | 5–3 | (Russia) Zvezda Perm | 5–0 | 0–3 |
| Barcelona (Spain) | 1–2 | (England) Bristol Academy | 0–1 | 1–1 |
| Frankfurt (Germany) | 9–0 | (Italy) Torres | 5–0 | 4–0 |
| Brøndby (Denmark) | 5–2 | (Lithuania) Gintra Universitetas | 5–0 | 0–2 |

Notes

1. Order of legs reversed after original draw.

=== Quarter-finals ===
The draw for the quarter-finals, semi-finals and final (to determine the "home" team for administrative purposes) was held on 19 November 2014. It was an open draw with no restrictions. The first legs were played on 21 and 22 March, and the second legs were played on 28 and 29 March 2015.

| Team 1 | Agg. | Team 2 | 1st leg | 2nd leg |
|---|---|---|---|---|
| Bristol Academy (England) | 0–12 | (Germany) Frankfurt | 0–5 | 0–7 |
| Wolfsburg (Germany) | 4–4 (a) | (Sweden) Rosengård | 1–1 | 3–3 |
| Glasgow City (Scotland) | 0–7 | (France) Paris Saint-Germain | 0–2 | 0–5 |
| Linköping (Sweden) | 1–2 | (Denmark) Brøndby | 0–1 | 1–1 |

Notes

2. Order of legs reversed after original draw.

=== Semi-finals ===
The first legs were played on 18 and 19 April and the second legs on 25 and 26 April 2015.

| Team 1 | Agg. | Team 2 | 1st leg | 2nd leg |
|---|---|---|---|---|
| Wolfsburg (Germany) | 2–3 | (France) Paris Saint-Germain | 0–2 | 2–1 |
| Frankfurt (Germany) | 13–0 | (Denmark) Brøndby | 7–0 | 6–0 |

=== Final ===
The final was played on 14 May 2015 at the Friedrich-Ludwig-Jahn-Sportpark in Berlin, Germany.

14 May 2015
18:00 CEST

| Frankfurt (Germany) | 2–1 | (France) Paris Saint-Germain |
|---|---|---|
| Šašić 32'; Islacker 90+2' | Report | Delie 40' |

Friedrich-Ludwig-Jahn-Sportpark, Berlin
Attendance: 17,147
Referee: Esther Staubli (Switzerland)

== Statistics ==
Statistics include both qualifying round and knockout phase.

=== Top goalscorers ===
With 14 goals, Šašić set a new record in the Champions League era and tied the record including the Women's Cup era.

| Rank | Player | Team | Goals | Minutes played |
|---|---|---|---|---|
| 1 | (Germany) Célia Šašić | (Germany) Frankfurt | 14 | 690 |
| 2 | (Bosnia and Herzegovina) Milena Nikolić | (Serbia) Spartak Subotica | 9 | 255 |
| 3 | (Poland) Ewa Pajor | (Poland) Medyk Konin | 8 | 433 |
| 3 | (Switzerland) Fabienne Humm | (Switzerland) Zürich | 8 | 585 |
| 5 | (Spain) Verónica Boquete | (Germany) Frankfurt | 6 | 720 |
| 5 | (Germany) Dzsenifer Marozsán | (Germany) Frankfurt | 6 | 775 |
| 7 | (Germany) Mandy Islacker | (Germany) Frankfurt | 5 | 221 |
| 7 | (Belgium) Aline Zeler | (Belgium) Standard Liège | 5 | 245 |
| 7 | (Romania) Cosmina Dușa | (Turkey) Konak Belediyespor | 5 | 270 |
| 7 | (Greece) Maria Mitkou | (Greece) Amazones Dramas | 5 | 270 |
| 7 | (Ivory Coast) Josée Nahi | (Russia) Zvezda Perm | 5 | 270 |
| 7 | (Hungary) Fanny Vágó | (Romania) Olimpia Cluj | 5 | 270 |
| 7 | (France) Eugénie Le Sommer | (France) Lyon | 5 | 315 |
| 7 | (Poland) Anna Gawrońska | (Poland) Medyk Konin | 5 | 480 |
| 7 | (Germany) Anja Mittag | (Sweden) Rosengård | 5 | 540 |

Source: UEFA.com

=== Squad of the season ===
The UEFA technical study group selected the following 18 players as the squad of the tournament:

| Pos. | Player | Team |
|---|---|---|
| GK | (Poland) Katarzyna Kiedrzynek | (France) Paris |
| GK | (Sweden) Zećira Mušović | (Sweden) Rosengård |
| DF | (France) Laure Boulleau | (France) Paris |
| DF | (Sweden) Nilla Fischer | (Germany) Wolfsburg |
| DF | (France) Sabrina Delannoy | (France) Paris |
| DF | (Denmark) Theresa Nielsen | (Denmark) Brøndby |
| DF | (Germany) Anna Blässe | (Germany) Wolfsburg |
| DF | (Germany) Bianca Schmidt | (Germany) Frankfurt |
| MF | (Spain) Verónica Boquete | (Germany) Frankfurt |
| MF | (Germany) Dzsenifer Marozsán | (Germany) Frankfurt |
| MF | (Germany) Simone Laudehr | (Germany) Frankfurt |
| MF | (Sweden) Caroline Seger | (France) Paris |
| MF | (Germany) Lena Goeßling | (Germany) Wolfsburg |
| MF | (Costa Rica) Shirley Cruz | (France) Paris |
| FW | (France) Kenza Dali | (France) Paris |
| FW | (Germany) Célia Šašić | (Germany) Frankfurt |
| FW | (Switzerland) Ramona Bachmann | (Sweden) Rosengård |
| FW | (Brazil) Marta | (Sweden) Rosengård |
