= Anna Björk Kristjánsdóttir =

Icelandic footballer (born 1989)

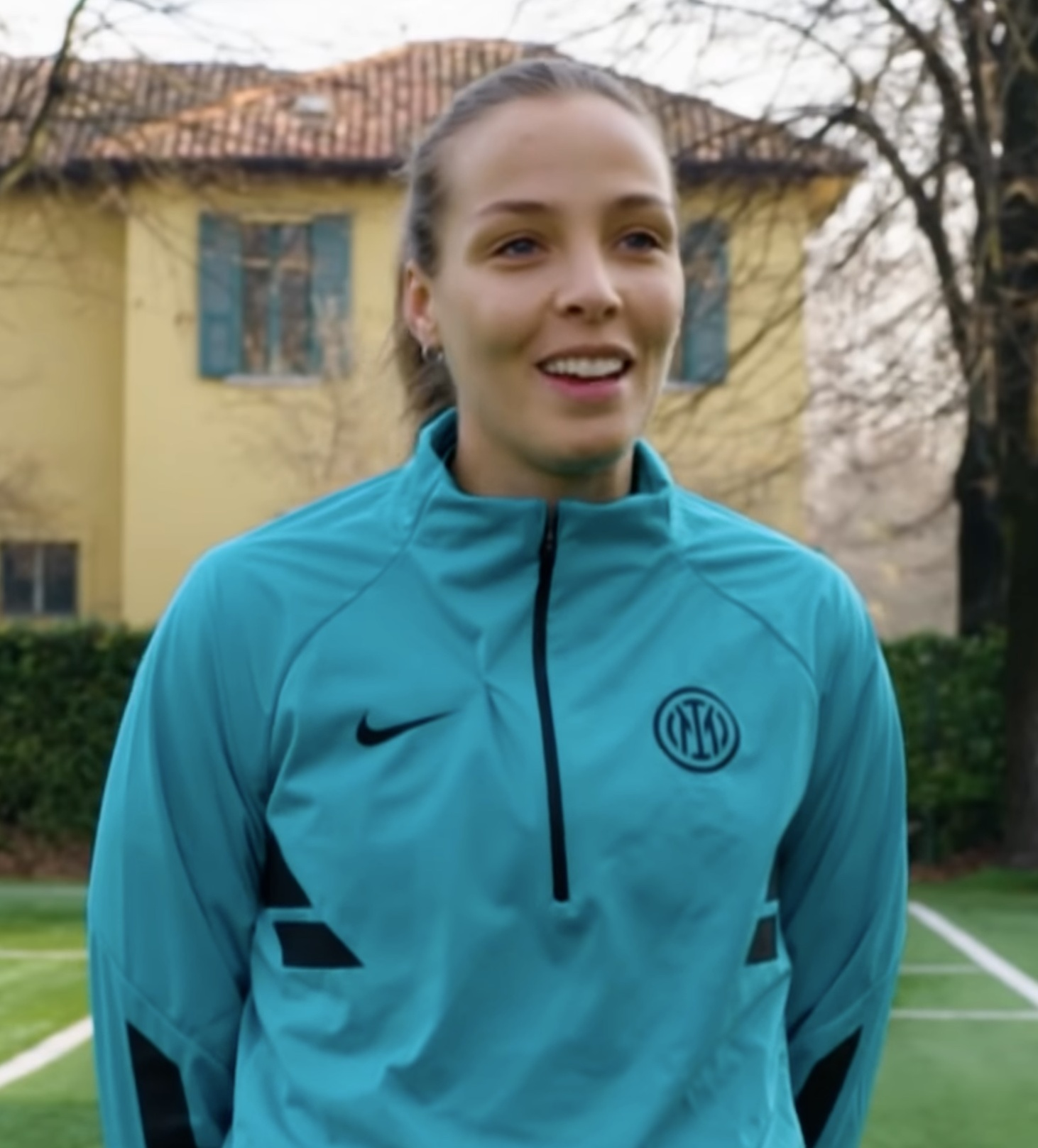

Personal information
- Full name: Anna Björk Kristjánsdóttir
- Date of birth: October 14, 1989 (age 37)
- Place of birth: Iceland
- Height: 1.77 m (5 ft 10 in)
- Position: Defender

Team information
- Current team: Valur
- Number: 29

Senior career*
Years	Team	Apps	(Gls)
2009–2016	Stjarnan	116	(8)
2016	KIF Örebro DFF	21	(1)
2017–2018	IF Limhamn Bunkeflo	43	(3)
2019	PSV	11	(2)
2020	Selfoss	13	(0)
2020–2021	Le Havre	18	(0)
2021–2023	Inter Milan	23	(0)
2023–	Valur	3	(1)

International career^{‡}
2013–	Iceland	43	(0)
- * Club domestic league appearances and goals as of `13 July 2020 (UTC) ‡ National team caps and goals as of 04:40, 1 January 2018 (UTC)

Anna Björk Kristjánsdóttir (born 14 October 1989) is an Icelandic football defender who plays for Valur.

== Honours ==
Stjarnan

- Úrvalsdeild (3): 2011, 2013, 2014; 2015 Runner-up
- Icelandic Women's Cup (3): 2012, 2014, 2015
- Icelandic League Cup A (3): 2013, 2014, 2015
- Icelandic Super Cup (2): 2012, 2015; 2013, 2014 Runner-up
