= János Marozsán =

Hungarian footballer (born 1965)

Personal information
- Date of birth: 13 May 1965 (age 61)
- Place of birth: Újfehértó, Hungary
- Height: 5 ft 9 in (1.75 m)
- Position: Midfielder

Senior career*
Years	Team	Apps	(Gls)
1985–1990	BFC Siófok	115	(25)
1990–1992	Budapest Honvéd FC	20	(2)
1992–1994	BFC Siófok	25	(1)
1994–1996	BVSC Budapest	30	(0)
1996	Pécsi MFC	3	(0)
1996–1997	1. FC Saarbrücken	13	(0)

International career
1990–1991	Hungary	4	(0)
- * Club domestic league appearances and goals as of 8 June 1997

János Marozsán (born 13 May 1965) is a Hungarian footballer.

He is the father of footballer Dzsenifer Marozsán.
