= Katrin Schmidt =

Swedish footballer (born 1986)

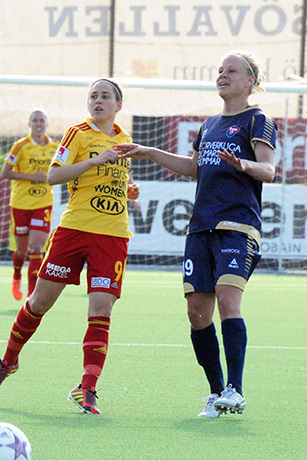
- Schmidt (R) playing for Rosengård against Tyresö

Personal information
- Date of birth: 21 June 1986 (age 40)
- Place of birth: Mechernich, West Germany
- Height: 1.70 m (5 ft 7 in)
- Position: Midfielder

College career
Years	Team	Apps	(Gls)
2005–2008	Florida State Seminoles	100	(9)

Senior career*
Years	Team	Apps	(Gls)
2004–2005	FFC Brauweiler Pulheim		
2008	Vancouver Whitecaps		
2009–2011	Tyresö FF	44	(8)
2012–2014	FC Rosengård	64	(4)
2015	Hammarby IF	20	(3)
2016–2017	Djurgårdens IF	44	(4)

International career^{‡}
2010	Germany U21	3	(0)
2017	Sweden	1	(0)
- * Club domestic league appearances and goals as of 7 September 2016 ‡ National team caps and goals as of 15 January 2014

Katrin Schmidt (born 21 June 1986) is a footballer who played as a midfielder for Djurgårdens IF of the Swedish Damallsvenskan. Born in West Germany, she represented Sweden at international level.

== Club career ==
Schmidt played in Germany, Canada and United States before moving to Sweden. She played for FC Rosengård from 2012 to 2014, winning a Damallsvenskan title in 2013 and a Super Cup in 2012.

When Hammarby IF DFF were relegated from the Damallsvenskan in 2015, Schmidt quit the club for their newly promoted Stockholm rivals Djurgårdens IF.

== Honours ==
=== Club ===
Djurgårdens IF

Winner

- Damallsvenskan: 2013, 2014
- Super Cup: 2012

Runner-up

- Damallsvenskan: 2012
