= Esther Staubli =

Swiss football referee (born 1979)

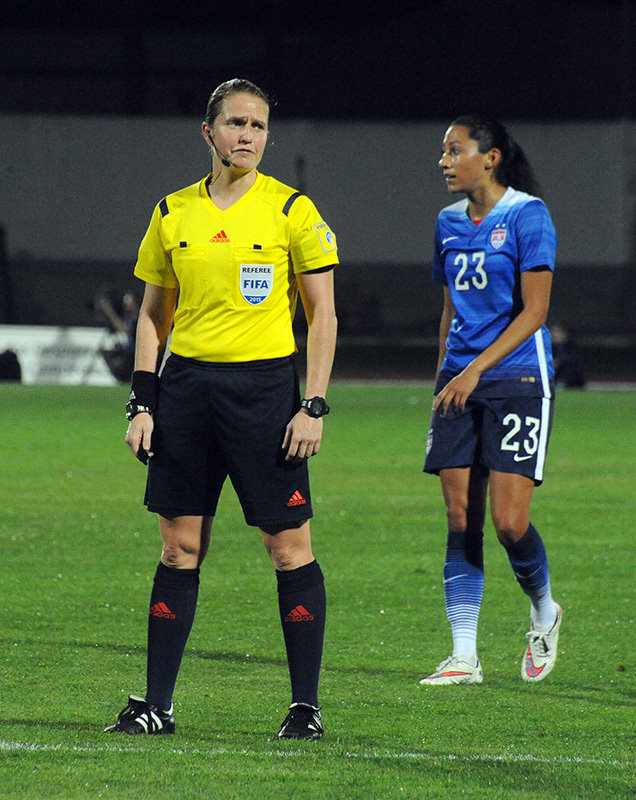
- Staubli (left) with Christen Press in 2015
- Born: 3 October 1979 (age 47); Bern, Switzerland

Domestic
Years	League	Role
2014–2024	Swiss Challenge League	Referee

International
Years	League	Role
2006–2024	FIFA listed	Referee

Esther Staubli (born 3 October 1979) is a Swiss football referee. German-speaking Staubli is 168 cm (5 ft 6 in) tall and has been on the FIFA International Referees List since 2006. An agronomist by trade, Staubli also lectures in a university.

She was selected to referee the 2015 UEFA Women's Champions League Final.

She also served as a referee for the 2015 FIFA Women's World Cup in Canada.

In 2014, she was voted fourth in the International Federation of Football History & Statistics (IFFHS) World's Best Woman Referee, behind winner Bibiana Steinhaus.

Staubli refereed in the men's Swiss Challenge League for the first time in September 2014, after which she was complimented on her performance by FC Wohlen coach Ciriaco Sforza.

In 2017, Staubli became the first woman to officiate in a Men's U-17 World Cup as a referee, when she took charge of group stage match between Japan and New Caledonia at the 2017 U-17 World Cup in India.

In December 2018, Staubli was appointed to referee at the 2019 FIFA Women's World Cup in France.

On 9 January 2023, FIFA appointed her to the officiating pool for the 2023 FIFA Women's World Cup in Australia and New Zealand.

Preceded by (Romania) Cristina Dorcioman	2017 UEFA Women's Euro Final (Switzerland) Esther Staubli	Succeeded by (Ukraine) Kateryna Monzul
Preceded by (Ukraine) Kateryna Monzul	2015 UEFA Women's Champions League Final (Switzerland) Esther Staubli	Succeeded by (Hungary) Katalin Kulcsár
