= Célia Šašić =

German footballer (born 1988)

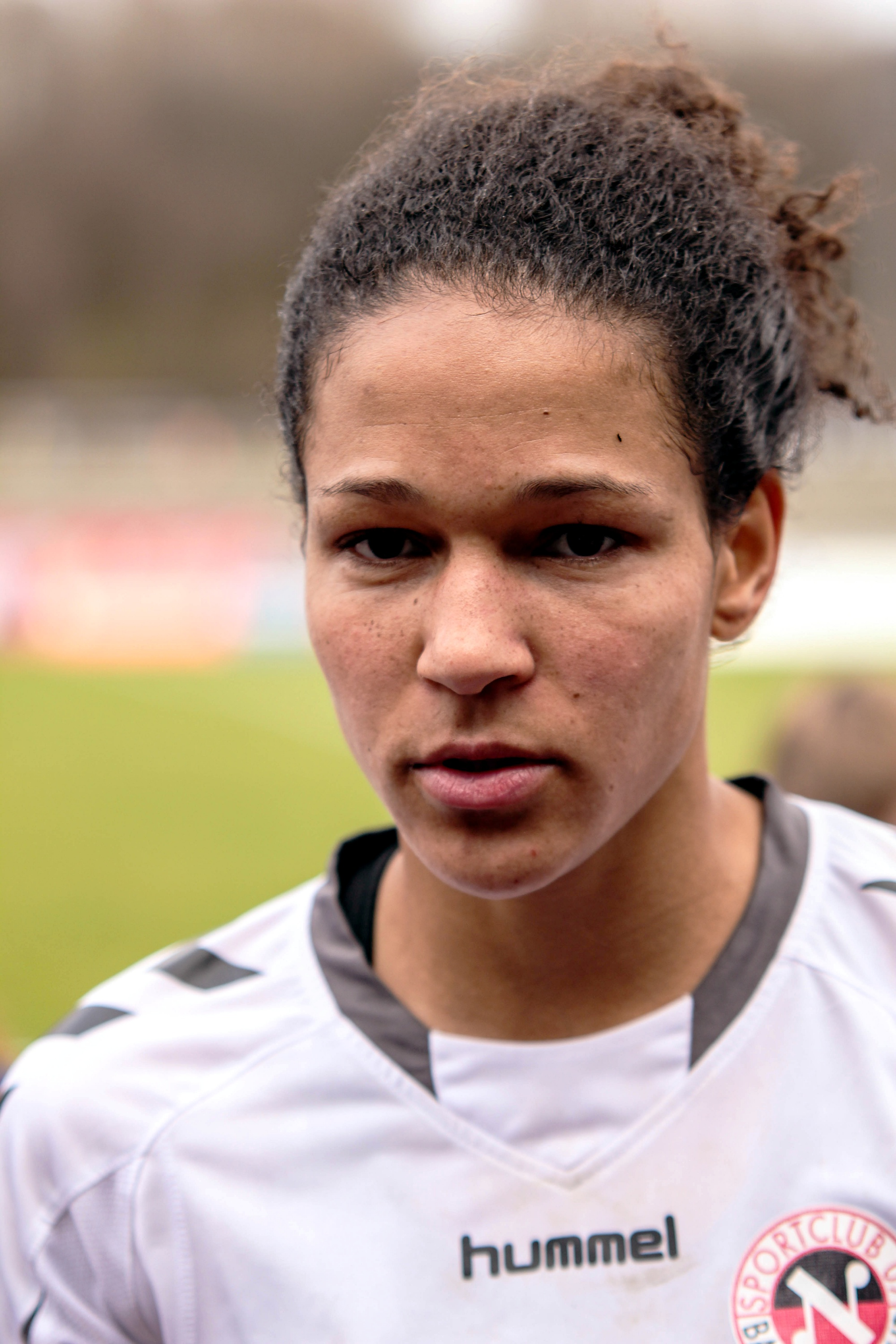
- Šašić in 2012

Personal information
- Full name: Célia Šašić
- Birth name: Célia Okoyino da Mbabi
- Date of birth: 27 June 1988 (age 38)
- Place of birth: Bonn, West Germany
- Height: 1.74 m (5 ft 9 in)
- Position: Striker

Youth career
- 1993–2000: TuS Germania Hersel
- 2000–2001: SC Widdig
- 2002–2003: TuS Pützchen 05
- 2003–2004: FC St. Augustin

Senior career*
Years	Team	Apps	(Gls)
2004–2013	SC 07 Bad Neuenahr	136	(97)
2013–2015	1. FFC Frankfurt	56	(61)
Total		192	(158)

International career
2004	Germany U17	13	(15)
2004–2005	Germany U19	12	(11)
2006	Germany U20	4	(2)
2005–2015	Germany	111	(63)
Medal record
Women's football
Representing Germany
Olympic Games
Bronze medal – third place	2008 Beijing	Team
UEFA Women's Championship
Gold medal – first place	2009 Finland	Team
Gold medal – first place	2013 Sweden	Team
- * Club domestic league appearances and goals

Célia Šašić (née Okoyino da Mbabi; German pronunciation: [ˈtseːlja ˈʃaːʃɪtʃ]; born 27 June 1988) is a German former footballer who played as a striker for SC 07 Bad Neuenahr, 1. FFC Frankfurt and the Germany national team before retiring in 2015.

== Club career ==
=== Youth career and SC 07 Bad Neuenahr ===
Šašić began her career at the age of five at TuS Germania Hersel, after her older brother had taken her to a training session. After several clubs at junior level, Šašić joined the Bundesliga side SC 07 Bad Neuenahr in 2004. She quickly became a regular starter and an important player for the club. In 2005, Šašić received the Fritz Walter medal in bronze as the year's third best female junior player. In March 2007, she suffered a fractured tibia in a league game against Bayern Munich, which ended her season. She had been the division's top-scorer up until then.

=== 1. FFC Frankfurt ===
In June 2013, she signed a three-year contract with 1. FFC Frankfurt. She declined the option for the third year on her contract on 12 May 2015 and became a free agent at the end of the 2014–15 season. On 16 July 2015, she announced her retirement at the age of 27.

== International career ==
Šašić held French citizenship through her mother. After the German Football Association had approached her, she became a German citizen at the beginning of 2004. Later that year, she was part of Germany's winning squad at the 2004 FIFA U-19 Women's World Championship, scoring three goals in the group stage.

In January 2005, Šašić made her debut for Germany's senior national team against Australia. She scored her first goal in a friendly match against Canada in September 2006. A tibia fracture ruled her out for the 2007 FIFA Women's World Cup. She was part of Germany's squads claiming bronze at the 2008 Summer Olympics and winning the title at the 2009 European Championship, where she scored in the semi-final against Norway. At both tournaments, she was a reserve player with limited playing time. Šašić was called up for the German 2011 FIFA Women's World Cup squad. She was part of the victorious German team at UEFA Women's Euro 2013.

She was part of the German team at FIFA Women's World Cup 2015. She scored a hat-trick in Germany's opening game against Ivory Coast on 7 June 2015, and would lead the tournament with six goals, scoring twice against Sweden in a 4–1 victory in the Round of 16, along with a penalty kick goal against France in the quarterfinals. However, she went on to miss a vital penalty kick versus the United States in the semifinals as Germany was eliminated. While Carli Lloyd scored three goals in the final to match Šašić's six and both had one assist, the tiebreaker regarding lesser playtime eventually gave Šašić the Golden Boot as the tournament top scorer. She subsequently announced her retirement from football on 17 July 2015.

== Personal life ==
Šašić was born in Bonn, Germany, the daughter of a Cameroonian father and a French mother. Her family name "da Mbabi" roughly means "(daughter) of Mbabi", while "Okoyino" derives from her father's grandmother. Because of her long name, she was the only women's Bundesliga player with only her first name on her jersey. However, in the national team, her full family name was displayed.

In 2007, Šašić graduated with the Abitur diploma at the Friedrich-Ebert-Gymnasium in Bonn. Her majors were Sports and French. Since October 2009, she began studying Cultural studies at the University of Koblenz and Landau. In August 2013 she married the Croatian football player Marko Šašić, the son of Milan Šašić, and decided to use the name Célia Šašić.

Šašić gave birth to her first child, a daughter, after retiring in 2016.

== Career statistics ==
=== Club ===
Appearances and goals by club, season and competition
Club	Season	League			Cup (Note: Includes DFB-Pokal Frauen)		Europe		Total	
Club	Season	Division	Apps	Goals	Apps	Goals	Apps	Goals	Apps	Goals
SC 07 Bad Neuenahr	2004–05	Bundesliga	12	5			—		12	5
SC 07 Bad Neuenahr	2005–06	Bundesliga	16	15			—		16	15
SC 07 Bad Neuenahr	2006–07	Bundesliga	12	11			—		12	11
SC 07 Bad Neuenahr	2007–08	Bundesliga	12	9			—		12	9
SC 07 Bad Neuenahr	2008–09	Bundesliga	7	4			—		7	4
SC 07 Bad Neuenahr	2009–10	Bundesliga	19	15	2	3	—		21	18
SC 07 Bad Neuenahr	2010–11	Bundesliga	19	17	4	3	—		23	20
SC 07 Bad Neuenahr	2011–12	Bundesliga	20	11	1	3	—		21	14
SC 07 Bad Neuenahr	2012–13	Bundesliga	19	10	2	2	—		21	12
SC 07 Bad Neuenahr	Total		136	97	9	11	—		145	108
1. FFC Frankfurt	2013–14	Bundesliga	20	20	4	2	—		24	22
1. FFC Frankfurt	2014–15	Bundesliga	20	21	4	4	8 (Note: Appearances in UEFA Women's Champions League)	14	32	39
1. FFC Frankfurt	Total		40	41	8	6	8	14	56	61
Career total			176	138	17	17	8	14	201	169

=== International goals ===
Scores and results list Germany's goal tally first, score column indicates score after each Šašić goal.

List of international goals scored by Célia Šašić
No.	Date	Venue	Opponent	Score	Result	Competition
1	4 September 2005	Edmonton, Canada	Canada	3–2	4–3	Friendly
2	25 October 2006	Aalen, Germany	England	5–1	5–1	Friendly
3	23 November 2006	Karlsruhe, Germany	Japan	3–0	6–3	Friendly
4	25 July 2009	Sinsheim, Germany	Netherlands	6–0	6–0	Friendly
5	7 September 2009	Helsinki, Finland	Norway	2–1	3–1	UEFA Women's Euro 2009
6	17 February 2010	Duisburg, Germany	North Korea	3–0	3–0	Friendly
7	15 September 2010	Dresden, Germany	Canada	5–0	5–0	Friendly
8	21 May 2011	Ingolstadt, Germany	North Korea	2–0	2–0	Friendly
9	3 June 2011	Osnabrück, Germany	France	4–0	5–0	Friendly
10	7 June 2011	Aachen, Germany	Netherlands	1–0	5–0	Friendly
11	26 June 2011	Berlin, Germany	Canada	2–0	2–1	2011 FIFA Women's World Cup
12	5 July 2011	Mönchengladbach, Germany	France	4–2	4–2	2011 FIFA Women's World Cup
13	19 November 2011	Wiesbaden, Germany	Kazakhstan	1–0	17–0	UEFA Women's Euro 2013 qualifying
14	19 November 2011	Wiesbaden, Germany	Kazakhstan	3–0	17–0	UEFA Women's Euro 2013 qualifying
15	19 November 2011	Wiesbaden, Germany	Kazakhstan	5–0	17–0	UEFA Women's Euro 2013 qualifying
16	19 November 2011	Wiesbaden, Germany	Kazakhstan	6–0	17–0	UEFA Women's Euro 2013 qualifying
17	15 February 2012	İzmir, Turkey	Turkey	2–0	5–0	UEFA Women's Euro 2013 qualifying
18	5 March 2012	Parchal, Portugal	Sweden	1–0	4–0	2012 Algarve Cup
19	5 March 2012	Parchal, Portugal	Sweden	2–0	4–0	2012 Algarve Cup
20	5 March 2012	Parchal, Portugal	Sweden	3–0	4–0	2012 Algarve Cup
21	7 March 2012	Faro, Portugal	Japan	2–0	4–3	2012 Algarve Cup
22	7 March 2012	Faro, Portugal	Japan	3–2	4–3	2012 Algarve Cup
23	7 March 2012	Faro, Portugal	Japan	4–3	4–3	2012 Algarve Cup
24	31 March 2012	Mannheim, Germany	Spain	1–0	5–0	UEFA Women's Euro 2013 qualifying
25	31 March 2012	Mannheim, Germany	Spain	2–0	5–0	UEFA Women's Euro 2013 qualifying
26	31 March 2012	Mannheim, Germany	Spain	4–0	5–0	UEFA Women's Euro 2013 qualifying
27	31 March 2012	Mannheim, Germany	Spain	5–0	5–0	UEFA Women's Euro 2013 qualifying
28	5 April 2012	Aarau, Switzerland	Switzerland	1–0	6–0	UEFA Women's Euro 2013 qualifying
29	5 April 2012	Aarau, Switzerland	Switzerland	3–0	6–0	UEFA Women's Euro 2013 qualifying
30	5 April 2012	Aarau, Switzerland	Switzerland	5–0	6–0	UEFA Women's Euro 2013 qualifying
31	5 April 2012	Aarau, Switzerland	Switzerland	6–0	6–0	UEFA Women's Euro 2013 qualifying
32	15 September 2012	Karaganda, Kazakhstan	Kazakhstan	1–0	7–0	UEFA Women's Euro 2013 qualifying
33	15 September 2012	Karaganda, Kazakhstan	Kazakhstan	3–0	7–0	UEFA Women's Euro 2013 qualifying
34	19 September 2012	Duisburg, Germany	Turkey	1–0	10–0	UEFA Women's Euro 2013 qualifying
35	19 September 2012	Duisburg, Germany	Turkey	7–0	10–0	UEFA Women's Euro 2013 qualifying
36	11 March 2013	Lagos, Portugal	Norway	1–0	2–0	2013 Algarve Cup
37	5 April 2013	Offenbach am Main, Germany	United States	2–3	3–3	Friendly
38	15 June 2013	Essen, Germany	Scotland	2–0	3–0	Friendly
39	15 June 2013	Essen, Germany	Scotland	3–0	3–0	Friendly
40	29 June 2013	Munich, Germany	Japan	2–1	4–2	Friendly
41	29 June 2013	Munich, Germany	Japan	3–2	4–2	Friendly
42	14 July 2013	Växjö, Sweden	Iceland	2–0	3–0	UEFA Women's Euro 2013
43	14 July 2013	Växjö, Sweden	Iceland	3–0	3–0	UEFA Women's Euro 2013
44	21 September 2013	Cottbus, Germany	Russia	1–0	9–0	2015 FIFA Women's World Cup qualification
45	26 October 2013	Koper, Slovenia	Slovenia	1–0	13–0	2015 FIFA Women's World Cup qualification
46	26 October 2013	Koper, Slovenia	Slovenia	6–0	13–0	2015 FIFA Women's World Cup qualification
47	26 October 2013	Koper, Slovenia	Slovenia	10–0	13–0	2015 FIFA Women's World Cup qualification
48	30 October 2013	Frankfurt, Germany	Croatia	1–0	4–0	2015 FIFA Women's World Cup qualification
49	27 November 2013	Osijek, Croatia	Croatia	2–0	8–0	2015 FIFA Women's World Cup qualification
50	5 March 2014	Albufeira, Portugal	Iceland	3–0	5–0	2013 Algarve Cup
51	13 September 2014	Moscow, Russia	Russia	2–1	4–1	2015 FIFA Women's World Cup qualification
52	13 September 2014	Moscow, Russia	Russia	3–1	4–1	2015 FIFA Women's World Cup qualification
53	13 September 2014	Moscow, Russia	Russia	4–1	4–1	2015 FIFA Women's World Cup qualification
54	23 November 2014	London, England	England	2–0	3–0	Friendly
55	23 November 2014	London, England	England	3–0	3–0	Friendly
56	9 March 2015	Parchal, Portugal	Brazil	3–1	3–1	2015 Algarve Cup
57	8 April 2015	Fürth, Germany	Brazil	1–0	4–0	Friendly
58	7 June 2015	Ottawa, Canada	Ivory Coast	1–0	10–0	2015 FIFA Women's World Cup
59	7 June 2015	Ottawa, Canada	Ivory Coast	2–0	10–0	2015 FIFA Women's World Cup
60	7 June 2015	Ottawa, Canada	Ivory Coast	4–0	10–0	2015 FIFA Women's World Cup
61	20 June 2015	Ottawa, Canada	Sweden	2–0	4–1	2015 FIFA Women's World Cup
62	20 June 2015	Ottawa, Canada	Sweden	3–0	4–1	2015 FIFA Women's World Cup
63	26 June 2015	Montreal, Canada	France	1–1	1–1	2015 FIFA Women's World Cup

== Honours ==
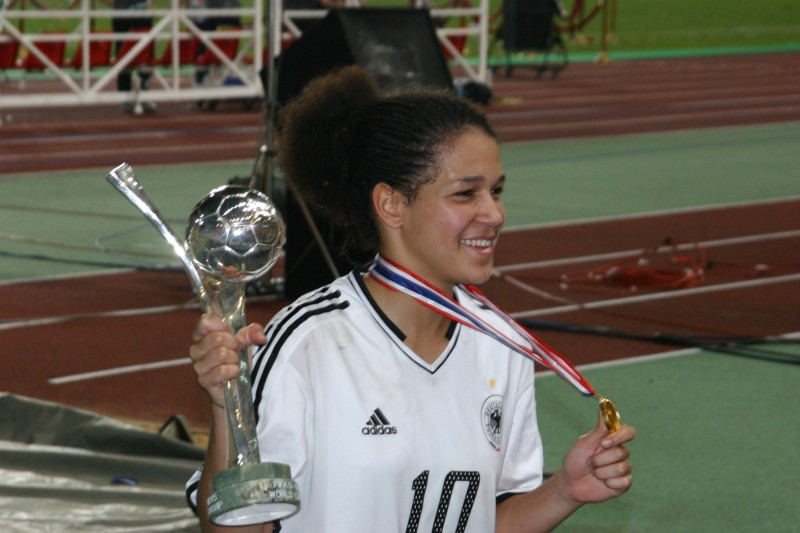
Šašić with the FIFA U-19 (now U-20) Women's World Cup trophy

1. FFC Frankfurt

- DFB-Pokal: 2013–14
- UEFA Women's Champions League: 2014–15

Germany

- UEFA European Championship: 2009, 2013
- Algarve Cup: 2006, 2012, 2014
- Olympic bronze medal: 2008

Germany U20

- U-19 Women's World Championship: 2004

Individual

- German Footballer of the Year: 2012, 2015
- Bundesliga top scorer: 2013–14, 2014–15
- UEFA Women's Champions League: top scorer: 2014–15
- Fritz Walter medal: Bronze 2005
- 2015 FIFA Women's World Cup Golden Shoe (top scorer)
- FIFA Women's World Cup All Star Team: 2015
- FIFA Women's World Cup Dream Team: 2015
- UEFA Best Women's Player in Europe Award: 2015
- FIFPro: FIFA FIFPro World XI 2015
- UEFA Women's Championship All-Star Team: 2013
