= UEFA Women's Euro 2013 knockout stage =

Football tournament knockout stage

The knockout stage of the UEFA Women's Euro 2013 was a single-elimination style tournament contested by the eight teams advancing from the group stage of the competition. It began on 21 July 2013 with the quarter-final round, and concluded on 28 July 2013 with the final at the Friends Arena, Solna, to determine the champions.

In the knockout stage (including the final), if a match was level at the end of 90 minutes, extra time of two periods (15 minutes each) was played. If the score was still level after extra time, the match was decided by a penalty shoot-out.

== Qualified teams ==
Group	Winners	Runners-up	Best two third-placed teams
A	Sweden	Italy	Denmark
B	Norway	Germany	Iceland
C	France	Spain	—

== Bracket ==
Quarter-finals
21 July – Halmstad
Sweden	4
Iceland	0
21 July – Växjö
Italy	0
Germany	1
22 July – Kalmar
Norway	3
Spain	1
22 July – Linköping
France	1 (2)
Denmark (p)	1 (4)

Semi-finals
24 July – Gothenburg
Sweden	0
Germany	1
25 July – Norrköping
Norway (p)	1 (4)
Denmark	1 (2)

Final
28 July – Solna
Germany	1
Norway	0

All times are local (UTC+2)

== Quarter-finals ==
=== Sweden vs Iceland ===
21 July 2013
15:00

Sweden	4–0	Iceland
M. Hammarström 3'; Öqvist 14'; Schelin 19', 59'	Report

Örjans Vall, Halmstad
Attendance: 7,468
Referee: Kirsi Heikkinen (Finland)

Sweden	Iceland

SWEDEN:
GK	1	Kristin Hammarström
RB	18	Jessica Samuelsson
CB	5	Nilla Fischer
CB	2	Charlotte Rohlin
LB	6	Sara Thunebro
RM	14	Josefine Öqvist	(substituted off) 46'
CM	17	Caroline Seger (c)
CM	20	Marie Hammarström	(substituted off) 63'
LM	10	Sofia Jakobsson
CF	9	Kosovare Asllani
CF	8	Lotta Schelin	(substituted off) 67'
Substitutions:
MF	11	Antonia Göransson	(substituted in) 46'
MF	7	Lisa Dahlkvist	(substituted in) 63'
MF	13	Emmelie Konradsson	(substituted in) 67'
Manager:
Pia Sundhage

ICELAND:
GK	13	Guðbjörg Gunnarsdóttir
RB	10	Dóra María Lárusdóttir
CB	2	Sif Atladóttir
CB	8	Katrín Jónsdóttir (c)		(substituted off) 81'
LB	5	Hallbera Guðný Gísladóttir
CM	14	Dagný Brynjarsdóttir
CM	7	Sara Björk Gunnarsdóttir
RW	19	Fanndís Friðriksdóttir	(yellow card) 50'	(substituted off) 65'
LW	3	Ólína Guðbjörg Viðarsdóttir
CF	22	Rakel Hönnudóttir
CF	9	Margrét Lára Viðarsdóttir		(substituted off) 79'
Substitutions:
FW	16	Harpa Þorsteinsdóttir		(substituted in) 65'
FW	23	Elín Metta Jensen		(substituted in) 79'
DF	4	Glódís Perla Viggósdóttir		(substituted in) 81'
Manager:
Sigurður Ragnar Eyjólfsson

Player of the Match:
Kosovare Asllani (Sweden)

Assistant referees:
Tonja Paavola (Finland)
Maria Villa Gutiérrez (Spain)
Fourth official:
Kateryna Monzul (Ukraine)

=== Italy vs Germany ===
21 July 2013
18:00

Italy	0–1	Germany
	Report	Laudehr 26'

Myresjöhus Arena, Växjö
Attendance: 9,265
Referee: Katalin Kulcsár (Hungary)

Italy	Germany

ITALY:
GK	12	Chiara Marchitelli
RB	16	Elisa Bartoli
CB	23	Cecilia Salvai	(yellow card) 63'	(substituted off) 70'
CB	3	Roberta D'Adda
LB	20	Raffaella Manieri
RM	4	Alessia Tuttino	(yellow card) 27'
CM	18	Daniela Stracchi	(yellow card) 87'
LM	11	Alice Parisi	(yellow card) 39'	(substituted off) 75'
RF	8	Melania Gabbiadini
CF	9	Patrizia Panico (c)
LF	13	Elisa Camporese		(substituted off) 46'
Substitutions:
FW	14	Sandy Iannella		(substituted in) 46'
DF	5	Federica Di Criscio	(yellow card) 90'	(substituted in) 70'
FW	15	Ilaria Mauro		(substituted in) 75'
Manager:
Antonio Cabrini

GERMANY:
GK	1	Nadine Angerer (c)
RB	4	Leonie Maier
CB	5	Annike Krahn
CB	3	Saskia Bartusiak
LB	15	Jennifer Cramer
CM	8	Nadine Keßler
CM	20	Lena Goeßling
RW	9	Lena Lotzen
AM	11	Anja Mittag	(substituted off) 52'
LW	6	Simone Laudehr
CF	13	Célia Okoyino da Mbabi	(substituted off) 68'
Substitutions:
FW	10	Dzsenifer Marozsán	(substituted in) 52'
MF	23	Sara Däbritz	(substituted in) 68'
Manager:
Silvia Neid

Player of the Match:
Simone Laudehr (Germany)

Assistant referees:
Judit Kulcsár (Hungary)
Hege Steinlund (Norway)
Fourth official:
Teodora Albon (Romania)

=== Norway vs Spain ===
22 July 2013
18:00

Norway	3–1	Spain
Gulbrandsen 24'; Paredes 43' (o.g.); Hegerberg 64'	Report	Hermoso 90+2'

Guldfågeln Arena, Kalmar
Attendance: 10,435
Referee: Bibiana Steinhaus (Germany)

Norway	Spain

NORWAY:
GK	1	Ingrid Hjelmseth
RB	6	Maren Mjelde
CB	7	Trine Bjerke Rønning
CB	3	Marit Fiane Christensen
LB	5	Toril Hetland Akerhaugen
RM	8	Solveig Gulbrandsen
CM	19	Ingvild Isaksen	(substituted off) 77'
LM	4	Ingvild Stensland (c)
RW	10	Caroline Graham Hansen	(substituted off) 81'
LW	16	Kristine Wigdahl Hegland
CF	21	Ada Hegerberg	(substituted off) 72'
Substitutions:
FW	9	Elise Thorsnes	(substituted in) 72'
FW	22	Cathrine Dekkerhus	(substituted in) 77'
MF	18	Ingrid Ryland	(substituted in) 81'
Manager:
Even Pellerud

SPAIN:
GK	1	Ainhoa Tirapu
RB	18	Marta Torrejón
CB	20	Irene Paredes
CB	5	Ruth García		(substituted off) 63'
LB	17	Elixabet Ibarra		(substituted off) 70'
CM	16	Nagore Calderón
CM	15	Silvia Meseguer
RW	10	Adriana Martín		(substituted off) 78'
LW	12	Alexia Putellas
SS	21	Jennifer Hermoso
CF	9	Verónica Boquete (c)
Substitutions:
FW	19	Erika Vázquez		(substituted in) 63'
DF	3	Leire Landa	(yellow card) 83'	(substituted in) 70'
FW	7	Priscila Borja		(substituted in) 78'
Manager:
Ignacio Quereda

Player of the Match:
Solveig Gulbrandsen (Norway)

Assistant referees:
Marina Wozniak (Germany)
Helen Karo (Sweden)
Fourth official:
Cristina Dorcioman (Romania)

=== France vs Denmark ===
22 July 2013
20:45

France	1–1 (a.e.t.)	Denmark
Nécib 71' (pen.)	Report	Rasmussen 28'
Penalties
Nécib (penalty missed); Thiney (penalty scored); Le Sommer (penalty scored); Delannoy (penalty missed)	2–4	(penalty scored) Røddik Hansen; (penalty scored) Rydahl Bukh; (penalty scored) Nadim; (penalty missed) Nielsen; (penalty scored) Arnth Jensen

Arena Linköping, Linköping
Attendance: 7,448
Referee: Carina Vitulano (Italy)

France	Denmark

FRANCE:
GK	16	Sarah Bouhaddi
RB	7	Corine Franco
CB	4	Laura Georges		(substituted off) 58'
CB	2	Wendie Renard	(yellow card) 114'
LB	3	Laure Boulleau
CM	8	Élise Bussaglia
CM	6	Sandrine Soubeyrand (c)		(substituted off) 46'
RW	9	Eugénie Le Sommer
AM	14	Louisa Nécib
LW	23	Camille Abily
CF	17	Gaëtane Thiney
Substitutions:
FW	12	Élodie Thomis		(substituted in) 46'
DF	22	Sabrina Delannoy		(substituted in) 58'
Manager:
Bruno Bini

DENMARK:
GK	1	Stina Lykke Petersen
RB	18	Theresa Nielsen
CB	4	Christina Ørntoft
CB	5	Janni Arnth Jensen	(yellow card) 47'
LB	2	Line Røddik Hansen
RM	6	Mariann Gajhede Knudsen
CM	3	Katrine Pedersen (c)
LM	19	Mia Brogaard		(substituted off) 75'
RF	13	Johanna Rasmussen		(substituted off) 61'
CF	10	Pernille Harder
LF	11	Katrine Veje		(substituted off) 68'
Substitutions:
MF	8	Julie Rydahl Bukh		(substituted in) 61'
FW	17	Nadia Nadim		(substituted in) 68'
MF	12	Line Jensen		(substituted in) 75'
Manager:
Kenneth Heiner-Møller

Player of the Match:
Christina Ørntoft (Denmark)

Assistant referees:
Romina Santuari (Italy)
Petruţa Iugulescu (Romania)
Fourth official:
Esther Staubli (Switzerland)

== Semi-finals ==
=== Sweden vs Germany ===
24 July 2013
20:30

Sweden	0–1	Germany
	Report	Marozsán 33'

Gamla Ullevi, Gothenburg
Attendance: 16,608
Referee: Esther Staubli (Switzerland)

Sweden	Germany

SWEDEN:
GK	1	Kristin Hammarström
RB	18	Jessica Samuelsson		(substituted off) 82'
CB	5	Nilla Fischer	(yellow card) 5'
CB	2	Charlotte Rohlin
LB	6	Sara Thunebro
RM	14	Josefine Öqvist		(substituted off) 74'
CM	17	Caroline Seger
CM	20	Marie Hammarström
LM	11	Antonia Göransson		(substituted off) 65'
CF	9	Kosovare Asllani
CF	8	Lotta Schelin (c)
Substitutions:
MF	15	Therese Sjögran		(substituted in) 65'
MF	10	Sofia Jakobsson		(substituted in) 74'
MF	7	Lisa Dahlkvist		(substituted in) 82'
Manager:
Pia Sundhage

GERMANY:
GK	1	Nadine Angerer (c)
RB	4	Leonie Maier
CB	5	Annike Krahn
CB	3	Saskia Bartusiak
LB	15	Jennifer Cramer
DM	8	Nadine Keßler
CM	20	Lena Goeßling
RW	9	Lena Lotzen		(substituted off) 78'
AM	10	Dzsenifer Marozsán		(substituted off) 89'
LW	6	Simone Laudehr	(yellow card) 43'
CF	11	Anja Mittag
Substitutions:
MF	16	Melanie Leupolz		(substituted in) 78'
DF	2	Bianca Schmidt		(substituted in) 89'
Manager:
Silvia Neid

Player of the Match:
Saskia Bartusiak (Germany)

Assistant referees:
Maria Lisická (Slovakia)
Judit Kulcsár (Hungary)
Fourth official:
Kirsi Heikkinen (Finland)

=== Norway vs Denmark ===
25 July 2013
20:30

Norway	1–1 (a.e.t.)	Denmark
Christensen 3'	Report	Gajhede Knudsen 87'
Penalties
Gulbrandsen (penalty scored); Dekkerhus (penalty scored); Mjelde (penalty scored); Rønning (penalty scored)	4–2	(penalty missed) Røddik Hansen; (penalty missed) Nielsen; (penalty scored) Nadim; (penalty scored) Brogaard

Nya Parken, Norrköping
Attendance: 9,260
Referee: Kateryna Monzul (Ukraine)

Norway	Denmark

NORWAY:
GK	1	Ingrid Hjelmseth	(yellow card) 84'
RB	6	Maren Mjelde
CB	7	Trine Bjerke Rønning
CB	3	Marit Fiane Christensen
LB	5	Toril Hetland Akerhaugen
DM	19	Ingvild Isaksen		(substituted off) 63'
CM	8	Solveig Gulbrandsen
CM	4	Ingvild Stensland (c)	(yellow card) 76'
RW	10	Caroline Graham Hansen		(substituted off) 58'
LW	16	Kristine Wigdahl Hegland
CF	21	Ada Hegerberg		(substituted off) 80'
Substitutions:
FW	9	Elise Thorsnes		(substituted in) 58'
MF	22	Cathrine Dekkerhus		(substituted in) 63'
FW	20	Emilie Haavi		(substituted in) 80'
Manager:
Even Pellerud

DENMARK:
GK	1	Stina Lykke Petersen
RB	18	Theresa Nielsen
CB	4	Christina Ørntoft	(substituted off) 82'
CB	5	Janni Arnth Jensen	(substituted off) 67'
LB	2	Line Røddik Hansen
RM	19	Mia Brogaard
CM	3	Katrine Pedersen (c)
LM	6	Mariann Gajhede Knudsen
RF	11	Katrine Veje
CF	10	Pernille Harder
LF	8	Julie Rydahl Bukh	(substituted off) 68'
Substitutions:
MF	17	Nadia Nadim	(substituted in) 67'
MF	13	Johanna Rasmussen	(substituted in) 68'
FW	7	Emma Madsen	(substituted in) 82'
Manager:
Kenneth Heiner-Møller

Player of the Match:
Marit Fiane Christensen (Norway)

Assistant referees:
Natalia Rachynska (Ukraine)
Lucie Ratajová (Czech Republic)
Fourth official:
Katalin Kulcsár (Hungary)

== Final ==
28 July 2013
16:00

Germany	1–0	Norway
Mittag 49'	Report

Friends Arena, Solna
Attendance: 41,301
Referee: Cristina Dorcioman (Romania)

Germany	Norway

GERMANY:
GK	1	Nadine Angerer (c)
RB	4	Leonie Maier
CB	5	Annike Krahn	(yellow card) 70'
CB	3	Saskia Bartusiak
LB	15	Jennifer Cramer
DM	8	Nadine Keßler
CM	20	Lena Goeßling
RW	9	Lena Lotzen		(substituted off) 46'
AM	10	Dzsenifer Marozsán
LW	6	Simone Laudehr		(substituted off) 77'
CF	13	Célia Okoyino da Mbabi
Substitutions:
FW	11	Anja Mittag		(substituted in) 46'
DF	2	Bianca Schmidt		(substituted in) 77'
Manager:
Silvia Neid

NORWAY:
GK	1	Ingrid Hjelmseth
RB	6	Maren Mjelde
CB	7	Trine Bjerke Rønning
CB	3	Marit Fiane Christensen	(substituted off) 85'
LB	5	Toril Hetland Akerhaugen
DM	22	Cathrine Dekkerhus
CM	8	Solveig Gulbrandsen	(substituted off) 68'
CM	4	Ingvild Stensland (c)	(substituted off) 76'
RW	10	Caroline Graham Hansen
LW	16	Kristine Wigdahl Hegland
CF	21	Ada Hegerberg
Substitutions:
FW	9	Elise Thorsnes	(substituted in) 68'
MF	19	Ingvild Isaksen	(substituted in) 76'
FW	11	Leni Larsen Kaurin	(substituted in) 85'
Manager:
Even Pellerud

Player of the Match:
Nadine Angerer (Germany)

Assistant referees:
Maria Villa Gutiérrez (Spain)
Sian Massey (England)
Fourth official:
Kirsi Heikkinen (Finland)
Fifth official:
Lucie Ratajová (Czech Republic)
