= UEFA Women's Euro 2013 Group B =

Football tournament group stage

Group B of the UEFA Women's Euro 2013 consisted of Germany, the reigning champions, Iceland, Netherlands and Norway. Matches were staged in Kalmar and Växjö from 11–17 July 2013.

Norway won the group and advanced to the knockout stage along with group runners-up Germany. Iceland progressed as one of the best third-placed teams while the Netherlands failed to advance.

== Standings ==
Pos	Team	Pld	W	D	L	GF	GA	GD	Pts	Qualification
1	Norway	3	2	1	0	3	1	+2	7	Advance to knockout stage
2	Germany	3	1	1	1	3	1	+2	4 (Note: Head-to-head result: Iceland 0–3 Germany.)	Advance to knockout stage
3	Iceland	3	1	1	1	2	4	−2	4	Advance to knockout stage
4	Netherlands	3	0	1	2	0	2	−2	1	

Source: Group B

== Norway vs Iceland ==
11 July 2013
18:00

Norway	1–1	Iceland
Hegland 26'	Report	M. Viðarsdóttir 87' (pen.)

Guldfågeln Arena, Kalmar
Attendance: 3,867
Referee: Katalin Kulcsár (Hungary)

Norway	Iceland

NORWAY:
GK	1	Ingrid Hjelmseth
RB	6	Maren Mjelde
CB	3	Marit Fiane Christensen	(yellow card) 86'
CB	7	Trine Bjerke Rønning
LB	5	Toril Hetland Akerhaugen
RM	8	Solveig Gulbrandsen
CM	19	Ingvild Isaksen
LM	4	Ingvild Stensland (c)		(substituted off) 75'
RF	10	Caroline Graham Hansen		(substituted off) 84'
CF	21	Ada Hegerberg		(substituted off) 75'
LF	16	Kristine Wigdahl Hegland
Substitutions:
FW	17	Lene Mykjåland		(substituted on) 75'
FW	9	Elise Thorsnes		(substituted on) 75'
FW	11	Leni Larsen Kaurin		(substituted on) 84'
Manager:
Even Pellerud

ICELAND:
GK	13	Guðbjörg Gunnarsdóttir
RB	10	Dóra María Lárusdóttir
CB	2	Sif Atladóttir		(substituted off) 63'
CB	8	Katrín Jónsdóttir (c)
LB	5	Hallbera Guðný Gísladóttir
CM	14	Dagný Brynjarsdóttir		(substituted off) 83'
CM	7	Sara Björk Gunnarsdóttir
RW	19	Fanndís Friðriksdóttir		(substituted off) 63'
LW	6	Hólmfríður Magnúsdóttir	(yellow card) 34'
CF	22	Rakel Hönnudóttir
CF	9	Margrét Lára Viðarsdóttir
Substitutions:
FW	16	Harpa Þorsteinsdóttir		(substituted on) 63'
DF	4	Glódís Perla Viggósdóttir		(substituted on) 63'
MF	11	Katrín Ómarsdóttir		(substituted on) 83'
Manager:
Sigurður Ragnar Eyjólfsson

Player of the Match:
Sara Björk Gunnarsdóttir (Iceland)

Assistant referees:
Judit Kulcsár (Hungary)
Sian Massey (England)
Fourth official:
Kirsi Heikkinen (Finland)

== Germany vs Netherlands ==
11 July 2013
20:30

Germany	0–0	Netherlands
	Report

Myresjöhus Arena, Växjö
Attendance: 8,861
Referee: Silvia Spinelli (Italy)

Germany	Netherlands

GERMANY:
GK	1	Nadine Angerer (c)
RB	4	Leonie Maier	(yellow card) 15'
CB	5	Annike Krahn
CB	3	Saskia Bartusiak
LB	15	Jennifer Cramer	(yellow card) 73'
CM	8	Nadine Keßler	(yellow card) 36'	(substituted off) 46'
CM	20	Lena Goeßling
RW	9	Lena Lotzen		(substituted off) 73'
AM	10	Dzsenifer Marozsán
LW	11	Anja Mittag
CF	13	Célia Okoyino da Mbabi
Substitutions:
MF	6	Simone Laudehr		(substituted on) 46'
MF	16	Melanie Leupolz		(substituted on) 73'
Manager:
Silvia Neid

NETHERLANDS:
GK	1	Loes Geurts
RB	2	Dyanne Bito	(yellow card) 87'
CB	3	Daphne Koster (c)
CB	6	Anouk Hoogendijk
LB	5	Claudia van den Heiligenberg
CM	14	Renée Slegers
CM	8	Sherida Spitse
RW	7	Kirsten van de Ven
AM	10	Daniëlle van de Donk
LW	11	Lieke Martens
CF	9	Manon Melis
Substitutions:
Manager:
Roger Reijners

Player of the Match:
Lieke Martens (Netherlands)

Assistant referees:
Romina Santuari (Italy)
Maria Lisická (Slovakia)
Fourth official:
Carina Vitulano (Italy)

== Norway vs Netherlands ==
14 July 2013
18:00

Norway	1–0	Netherlands
Gulbrandsen 54'	Report

Guldfågeln Arena, Kalmar
Attendance: 4,256
Referee: Teodora Albon (Romania)

Norway	Netherlands

NORWAY:
GK	1	Ingrid Hjelmseth
RB	6	Maren Mjelde
CB	7	Trine Bjerke Rønning
CB	3	Marit Fiane Christensen
LB	5	Toril Hetland Akerhaugen
RM	8	Solveig Gulbrandsen	(substituted off) 72'
CM	19	Ingvild Isaksen
LM	4	Ingvild Stensland (c)
RF	10	Caroline Graham Hansen	(substituted off) 79'
CF	21	Ada Hegerberg	(substituted off) 72'
LF	16	Kristine Wigdahl Hegland
Substitutions:
FW	13	Melissa Bjånesøy	(substituted on) 72'
MF	22	Cathrine Dekkerhus	(substituted on) 72'
FW	9	Elise Thorsnes	(substituted on) 79'
Manager:
Even Pellerud

NETHERLANDS:
GK	1	Loes Geurts
RB	2	Dyanne Bito
CB	3	Daphne Koster (c)
CB	6	Anouk Hoogendijk
LB	5	Claudia van den Heiligenberg	(substituted off) 60'
CM	8	Sherida Spitse	(substituted off) 86'
CM	14	Renée Slegers
RW	7	Kirsten van de Ven
AM	10	Daniëlle van de Donk	(substituted off) 77'
LW	11	Lieke Martens
CF	9	Manon Melis
Substitutions:
DF	17	Siri Worm	(substituted on) 60'
FW	19	Mandy Versteegt	(substituted on) 77'
MF	18	Anouk Dekker	(substituted on) 86'
Manager:
Roger Reijners

Player of the Match:
Marit Fiane Christensen (Norway)

Assistant referees:
Petruţa Iugulescu (Romania)
Judit Kulcsár (Hungary)
Fourth official:
Esther Azzopardi (Malta)

== Iceland vs Germany ==
14 July 2013
20:30

Iceland	0–3	Germany
	Report	Lotzen 24'; Okoyino da Mbabi 55', 84'

Myresjöhus Arena, Växjö
Attendance: 4,620
Referee: Kirsi Heikkinen (Finland)

Iceland	Germany

ICELAND:
GK	13	Guðbjörg Gunnarsdóttir
RB	10	Dóra María Lárusdóttir
CB	4	Glódís Perla Viggósdóttir
CB	8	Katrín Jónsdóttir (c)	(yellow card) 72'
LB	5	Hallbera Guðný Gísladóttir
CM	14	Dagný Brynjarsdóttir		(substituted off) 46'
CM	7	Sara Björk Gunnarsdóttir		(substituted off) 60'
RW	22	Rakel Hönnudóttir
LW	6	Hólmfríður Magnúsdóttir
CF	16	Harpa Þorsteinsdóttir
CF	9	Margrét Lára Viðarsdóttir
Substitutions:
MF	11	Katrín Ómarsdóttir	(substituted on) 46'	(substituted off) 70'
DF	3	Ólína Guðbjörg Viðarsdóttir		(substituted on) 60'
MF	18	Guðný Björk Óðinsdóttir		(substituted on) 70'
Manager:
Sigurður Ragnar Eyjólfsson

GERMANY:
GK	1	Nadine Angerer (c)
RB	4	Leonie Maier
CB	5	Annike Krahn
CB	3	Saskia Bartusiak
LB	15	Jennifer Cramer	(yellow card) 53'
CM	8	Nadine Keßler
CM	20	Lena Goeßling		(substituted off) 70'
RW	9	Lena Lotzen		(substituted off) 64'
AM	10	Dzsenifer Marozsán		(substituted off) 74'
LW	16	Melanie Leupolz
CF	13	Célia Okoyino da Mbabi
Substitutions:
MF	19	Fatmire Bajramaj		(substituted on) 64'
MF	6	Simone Laudehr		(substituted on) 70'
FW	11	Anja Mittag		(substituted on) 74'
Manager:
Silvia Neid

Player of the Match:
Célia Okoyino da Mbabi (Germany)

Assistant referees:
Tonja Paavola (Finland)
Helen Karo (Sweden)
Fourth official:
Monika Mularczyk (Poland)

== Germany vs Norway ==
17 July 2013
18:00

Germany	0–1	Norway
	Report	Isaksen 45+1'

Guldfågeln Arena, Kalmar
Attendance: 10,346
Referee: Esther Staubli (Switzerland)

Germany	Norway

GERMANY:
GK	1	Nadine Angerer (c)
RB	22	Luisa Wensing
CB	3	Saskia Bartusiak
CB	5	Annike Krahn
LB	4	Leonie Maier
CM	8	Nadine Keßler
CM	6	Simone Laudehr	(substituted off) 66'
RW	9	Lena Lotzen	(substituted off) 79'
AM	10	Dzsenifer Marozsán
LW	16	Melanie Leupolz	(substituted off) 67'
CF	13	Célia Okoyino da Mbabi
Substitutions:
MF	7	Melanie Behringer	(substituted on) 66'
FW	11	Anja Mittag	(substituted on) 67'
MF	23	Sara Däbritz	(substituted on) 79'
Manager:
Silvia Neid

NORWAY:
GK	1	Ingrid Hjelmseth
RB	6	Maren Mjelde (c)
CB	2	Marita Skammelsrud Lund
CB	15	Nora Holstad Berge
LB	5	Toril Hetland Akerhaugen
DM	19	Ingvild Isaksen
CM	14	Gry Tofte Ims	(yellow card) 31'	(substituted off) 58'
CM	22	Cathrine Dekkerhus
RF	20	Emilie Haavi		(substituted off) 73'
CF	21	Ada Hegerberg
LF	9	Elise Thorsnes		(substituted off) 58'
Substitutions:
MF	8	Solveig Gulbrandsen		(substituted on) 58'
FW	10	Caroline Graham Hansen		(substituted on) 58'
MF	4	Ingvild Stensland		(substituted on) 73'
Manager:
Even Pellerud

Player of the Match:
Maren Mjelde (Norway)

Assistant referees:
Maria Lisická (Slovakia)
Romina Santuari (Italy)
Fourth official:
Teodora Albon (Romania)

== Netherlands vs Iceland ==
17 July 2013
18:00

Netherlands	0–1	Iceland
	Report	Brynjarsdóttir 30'

Myresjöhus Arena, Växjö
Attendance: 3,406
Referee: Cristina Dorcioman (Romania)

Netherlands	Iceland

NETHERLANDS:
GK	1	Loes Geurts
RB	2	Dyanne Bito
CB	3	Daphne Koster (c)	(yellow card) 16'
CB	6	Anouk Hoogendijk
LB	5	Claudia van den Heiligenberg
CM	8	Sherida Spitse
CM	14	Renée Slegers	(yellow card) 28'	(substituted off) 46'
AM	10	Daniëlle van de Donk
RW	7	Kirsten van de Ven		(substituted off) 77'
LW	11	Lieke Martens
CF	9	Manon Melis
Substitutions:
FW	18	Anouk Dekker		(substituted on) 46'
FW	13	Sylvia Smit		(substituted on) 77'
Manager:
Roger Reijners

ICELAND:
GK	13	Guðbjörg Gunnarsdóttir
RB	10	Dóra María Lárusdóttir
CB	8	Katrín Jónsdóttir (c)
CB	2	Sif Atladóttir
LB	5	Hallbera Guðný Gísladóttir
CM	14	Dagný Brynjarsdóttir
CM	7	Sara Björk Gunnarsdóttir
RW	19	Fanndís Friðriksdóttir		(substituted off) 86'
LW	6	Hólmfríður Magnúsdóttir	(yellow card) 90+2'
CF	22	Rakel Hönnudóttir
CF	9	Margrét Lára Viðarsdóttir		(substituted off) 62'
Substitutions:
FW	16	Harpa Þorsteinsdóttir		(substituted on) 62'
DF	3	Ólína Guðbjörg Viðarsdóttir		(substituted on) 86'
Manager:
Sigurður Ragnar Eyjólfsson

Player of the Match:
Dagný Brynjarsdóttir (Iceland)

Assistant referees:
Petruţa Iugulescu (Romania)
Hege Steinlund (Norway)
Fourth official:
Carina Vitulano (Italy)
