= UEFA Women's Euro 2013 final =

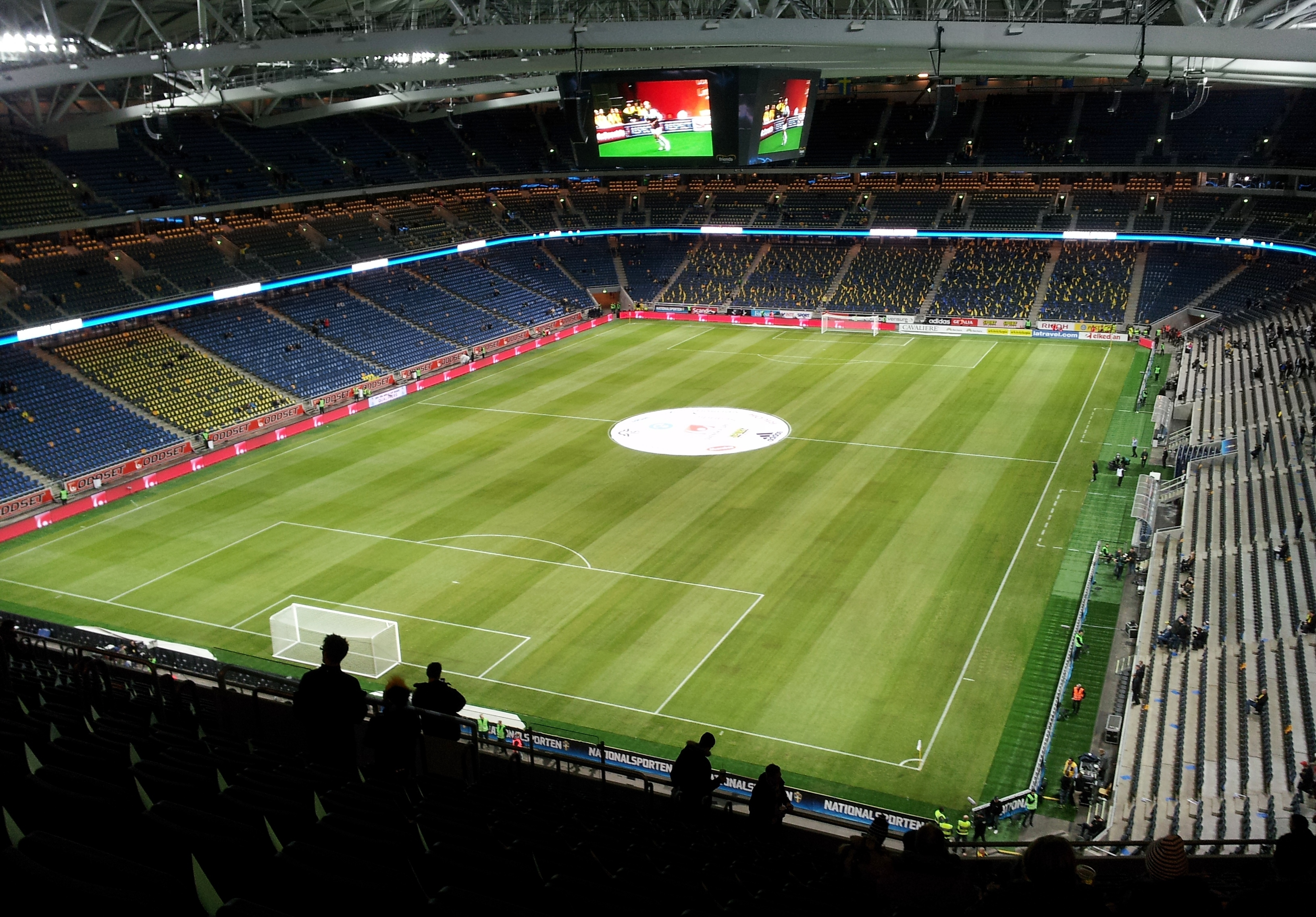
- Nationalarenan in Solna, Sweden, where the final took place
- Event: UEFA Women's Euro 2013
Germany	Norway
(Germany)	(Norway)
1	0
- Date: 28 July 2013
- Venue: Nationalarenan, Solna, Sweden
- Player of the Match: Nadine Angerer (Germany)
- Referee: Cristina Dorcioman (Romania)
- Attendance: 41,301
- Weather: Scattered clouds 25 °C (77 °F)

The final of UEFA Women's Euro 2013 was held on 28 July 2013 at Nationalarenan (now known as the Friends Arena) in Solna, Sweden. The match was won by the defending champions Germany, who earned their sixth consecutive European title – and eighth in total – with a 1–0 win over Norway.

The match took place in front of a record crowd for a Women's European Championship fixture as 41,301 spectators saw Anja Mittag score the only goal of the game in the 49th minute. Norway were awarded two penalties during the match but both were saved by German goalkeeper Nadine Angerer.

== Background ==
Germany had previously won the competition a record seven times (including one title as West Germany) and had won six of the seven tournaments staged under its current title and status (in 1991, 1995, 1997, 2001, 2005, and 2009). Three of their seven titles had come after defeating Norway in the final. Despite losing three finals, Norway had twice previously managed to win the competition: in 1987 under its original title of the UEFA European Competition for Representative Women's Teams, and in 1993; the only time since the competition was given European Championship status by UEFA that Germany did not win the competition. With this unparalleled record in European women's football, Germany had begun the tournament as the number one ranked team, with Norway ranked fifth in UEFA's coefficient ranking before the competition.

The two teams had already met during the finals just eleven days earlier. In their final game of the group stage, Norway became the first team to defeat Germany in any form of UEFA Women's Euros fixture since they lost a qualifying match in May 1996, again against the Norwegians. Prior to the final, the two sides had previously met each other a total of 36 times, with Germany winning 17 and Norway 14. The 2013 Final was the fourth time that the two teams had met in the competition's final.

== Route to the final ==
Both teams began the tournament in Group B and achieved qualification for the knockout stage by gaining four points from their first two fixtures (both facing Iceland and the Netherlands, respectively). Although Germany led the group going into their final group matchday meeting on goal difference, Norway were able to defeat the Germans 1–0 through an Ingvild Isaksen goal to top the group and face Group C runner-up Spain in the quarter-final round.

Norway comfortably beat the Spanish team in a game that saw them three goals ahead by the 65th minute, eventually progressing as 3–1 victors. In their semi-final against Denmark, the Norwegians took a third-minute lead but their advantage was eventually cancelled out three minutes from full-time to send the game into extra time. After no further additions to the 1–1 scoreline, Norway successfully converted all four of their penalty kicks to win the shootout 4–2. Germany advanced through the knockout stage with two successive 1–0 wins, which firstly eliminated Italy, then the host nation Sweden in two tightly-contested matches.

Germany
Round
Norway
Opponent
Result
Group stage
Opponent
Result
Netherlands
0–0
Match 1
Iceland
1–1
Iceland
3–0
Match 2
Netherlands
1–0
Norway
0–1
Match 3
Germany
1–0

Pos	Team	Pld	W	D	L	GF	GA	GD	Pts	Qualification
1	Norway	3	2	1	0	3	1	+2	7	Advance to knockout stage
2	Germany	3	1	1	1	3	1	+2	4 (Note: Head-to-head result: Iceland 0–3 Germany.)	Advance to knockout stage
3	Iceland	3	1	1	1	2	4	−2	4	Advance to knockout stage
4	Netherlands	3	0	1	2	0	2	−2	1	

Source: Group B
Notes:
Final standing

Pos	Team	Pld	W	D	L	GF	GA	GD	Pts	Qualification
1	Norway	3	2	1	0	3	1	+2	7	Advance to knockout stage
2	Germany	3	1	1	1	3	1	+2	4 (Note: Head-to-head result: Iceland 0–3 Germany.)	Advance to knockout stage
3	Iceland	3	1	1	1	2	4	−2	4	Advance to knockout stage
4	Netherlands	3	0	1	2	0	2	−2	1	

Source: Group B
Notes:
Opponent
Result
Knockout stage
Opponent
Result
Italy
1–0
Quarter-final
Spain
3–1
Sweden
1–0
Semi-final
Denmark
1–1 (aet) (4–2 pen.)

== Match ==
=== Team selection ===
Neither team had any suspensions; indeed no red cards were shown during the entire tournament. In Germany's only change to their starting XI in their semi-final victory, Célia Okoyino da Mbabi, who had scored a record 19 goals during the overall qualification campaign and final tournament but had suffered a hamstring injury during their quarter-final win, was now fit enough to start. She replaced Anja Mittag, who had been pushed forward from her usual midfield role to cover Okoyino da Mbabi, as the main forward.

Despite having played 120 minutes in their semi-final three days earlier, Norway had no injury concerns ahead of the match. Coach Even Pellerud opted to make one change from their previous game as Cathrine Dekkerhus was selected ahead of Ingvild Isaksen in central midfield.

=== Summary ===
In the opening moments, a German free-kick from the right was met by a looping header from Nadine Keßler which Ingrid Hjelmseth in the Norwegian goal managed to keep out from underneath the crossbar. The opening half-hour brought several other opportunities for Germany, but Norway received the best chance to take the lead when Okoyino da Mbabi was adjudged to have brought down Cathrine Dekkerhus in the area and a penalty kick was awarded in the 29th minute. Trine Bjerke Rønning struck the ball powerfully but centrally and the German captain Nadine Angerer blocked it with her outstretched leg.

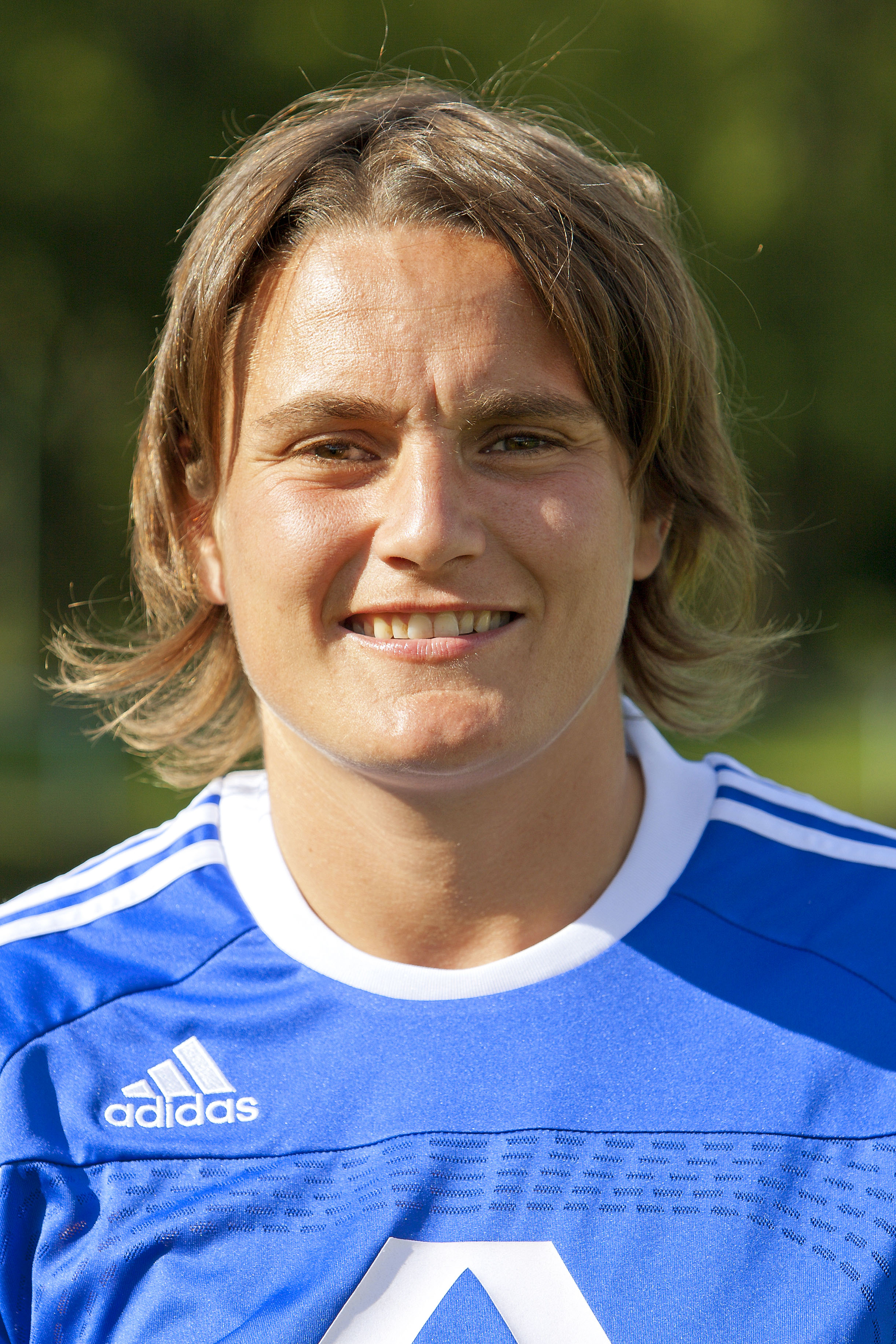
Nadine Angerer saved two penalties by Norway.

The deadlock was broken four minutes into the second-half when Okoyino da Mbabi's fast run along the left drew the attentions of the Norwegian defence. She was therefore able to square the ball into the centre of the penalty area, where an unmarked Anja Mittag – a half-time replacement for Lena Lotzen – was awaiting to side-foot the ball into the net from close range.

Germany then had further chances to increase their lead as two efforts from Okoyino da Mbabi had to be blocked on the goal-line by Norway. However, on the hour mark, Norway received a second penalty when Saskia Bartusiak fouled Caroline Graham Hansen. After Rønning's earlier miss, Solveig Gulbrandsen was instead chosen to take the kick but it was again saved by Angerer as she leapt to her left.

Norway did finally have the ball in the net four minutes later when Ada Hegerberg turned Maren Mjelde's drilled cross in, but it was ruled out for offside. In the 72nd minute, the Norwegian substitute Elise Thorsnes beat Angerer to a lofted through-ball but poked it narrowly wide. Eight minutes from time, Germany almost sealed victory when Leonie Maier crossed dangerously for Nadine Keßler to shoot, but her effort was scuffed and clipped the post. However, the single-goal advantage proved sufficient as the time ran out on Norway's attempts to win an equaliser.

=== Details ===
28 July 2013
16:00 UTC+2

Germany	1–0	Norway
Mittag 49'	Report

Friends Arena, Solna
Attendance: 41,301
Referee: Cristina Dorcioman (Romania)

Germany	Norway

GERMANY:
GK	1	Nadine Angerer (c)
RB	4	Leonie Maier
CB	5	Annike Krahn	(yellow card) 70'
CB	3	Saskia Bartusiak
LB	15	Jennifer Cramer
CM	8	Nadine Keßler
CM	20	Lena Goeßling
RW	9	Lena Lotzen		(substituted off) 46'
AM	10	Dzsenifer Marozsán
LW	6	Simone Laudehr		(substituted off) 77'
CF	13	Célia Okoyino da Mbabi
Substitutions:
FW	11	Anja Mittag		(substituted on) 46'
DF	2	Bianca Schmidt		(substituted on) 77'
Manager:
Silvia Neid

NORWAY:
GK	1	Ingrid Hjelmseth
RB	3	Marit Fiane Christensen	(substituted off) 85'
CB	7	Trine Bjerke Rønning
CB	6	Maren Mjelde
LB	5	Toril Hetland Akerhaugen
DM	4	Ingvild Stensland (c)	(substituted off) 76'
CM	8	Solveig Gulbrandsen	(substituted off) 68'
CM	22	Cathrine Dekkerhus
RW	10	Caroline Graham Hansen
LW	16	Kristine Wigdahl Hegland
CF	21	Ada Hegerberg
Substitutions:
FW	9	Elise Thorsnes	(substituted on) 68'
MF	19	Ingvild Isaksen	(substituted on) 76'
FW	11	Leni Larsen Kaurin	(substituted on) 85'
Manager:
Even Pellerud

Player of the Match:
Nadine Angerer (Germany)

Assistant referees:
Maria Villa Gutiérrez (Spain)
Sian Massey (England)
Fourth official:
Kirsi Heikkinen (Finland)

Match rules

- 90 minutes.
- 30 minutes of extra time if necessary.
- Penalty shoot-out if scores still level.
- Maximum of three substitutions.

=== Statistics ===
Statistic	Germany	Norway
Goals scored	1	0
Total shots	23	9
Shots on target	11	3
Corner kicks	6	6
Fouls committed	12	13
Offsides	2	1
Yellow cards	1	0
Red cards	0	0

== Post match ==
After the match, the trophy was handed to the German captain and Player of the Match Award winner Nadine Angerer by UEFA president Michel Platini. The German squad celebrated at their team hotel in Solna before returning home to a public reception at Frankfurt's town hall. Here, they were greeted by a crowd outside the building in excess of 7,000.
