= Ingvild Isaksen =

Norwegian footballer (born 1989)

Personal information
- Full name: Ingvild Landvik Isaksen
- Date of birth: 10 February 1989 (age 37)
- Place of birth: Fredrikstad, Norway
- Height: 1.66 m (5 ft 5 in)
- Position: Midfielder

Youth career
- Drøbak-Frogn IL

Senior career*
Years	Team	Apps	(Gls)
2006–2013	Kolbotn	148	(26)
2014–2017	Stabæk	42	(6)
2017–2018	Juventus	13	(1)

International career^{‡}
2009–2018	Norway	64	(3)
Medal record
Women's football
Representing Norway
UEFA Women's Championship
Silver medal – second place	2013 Sweden	Team
- * Club domestic league appearances and goals as of 3 July 2018 ‡ National team caps and goals as of 23:12, 24 January 2018 (UTC)

Ingvild Landvik Isaksen (born 10 February 1989) is a Norwegian former footballer. She made her debut for the Norway women's national football team in 2009 and represented her country at the 2009 and 2013 editions of the UEFA Women's Championship.

== Club career ==
In November 2013, Isaksen left Kolbotn after eight seasons to join champions Stabæk on a two-year contract. She had been club captain at Kolbotn, but wanted a new challenge. Later on, she played for Juventus, but she suffered serious knee injuries which forced her to leave the club after the season 2017–18. On 21 February 2019, Isaksen announced her retirement from football.

== International career ==
Isaksen made her senior national team debut in January 2009, in a 5–1 friendly defeat by Sweden in Marbella. At UEFA Women's Euro 2009 she was part of Norway's squad and made two substitute appearances, totalling 18 minutes. She played mostly as a winger for Norway and had drifted out of favour, until being brought back and given a more central midfield role by new coach Even Pellerud.

She was called up to be part of the national team for UEFA Women's Euro 2013. She scored her first goal for Norway in a 1–0 victory against Germany in Euro 2013, the Germans' first loss in a UEFA Women's Championship match since 1993. Isaksen performed well and started every match except the final where she was benched to accommodate Cathrine Dekkerhus. Isaksen came in as a substitute in the final where Norway missed two penalty kicks and lost 1–0.

== International goals ==
No.	Date	Venue	Opponent	Score	Result	Competition
1.	17 July 2013	Guldfågeln Arena, Kalmar, Sweden	Germany	1–0	1–0	UEFA Women's Euro 2013
2.	15 September 2016	Aker Stadion, Molde, Norway	Kazakhstan	8–0	10–0	2017 UEFA Women's Euro qualifying
