= Bjerkestrand =

Bjerkestrand is a Norwegian surname. Notable people with the surname include:

- Iver Bjerkestrand (born 1987), Norwegian alpine skier
- Kjetil Bjerkestrand (born 1955), Norwegian musician, composer, arranger, and record producer
