= Toril Hetland Akerhaugen =

Norwegian footballer (born 1982)

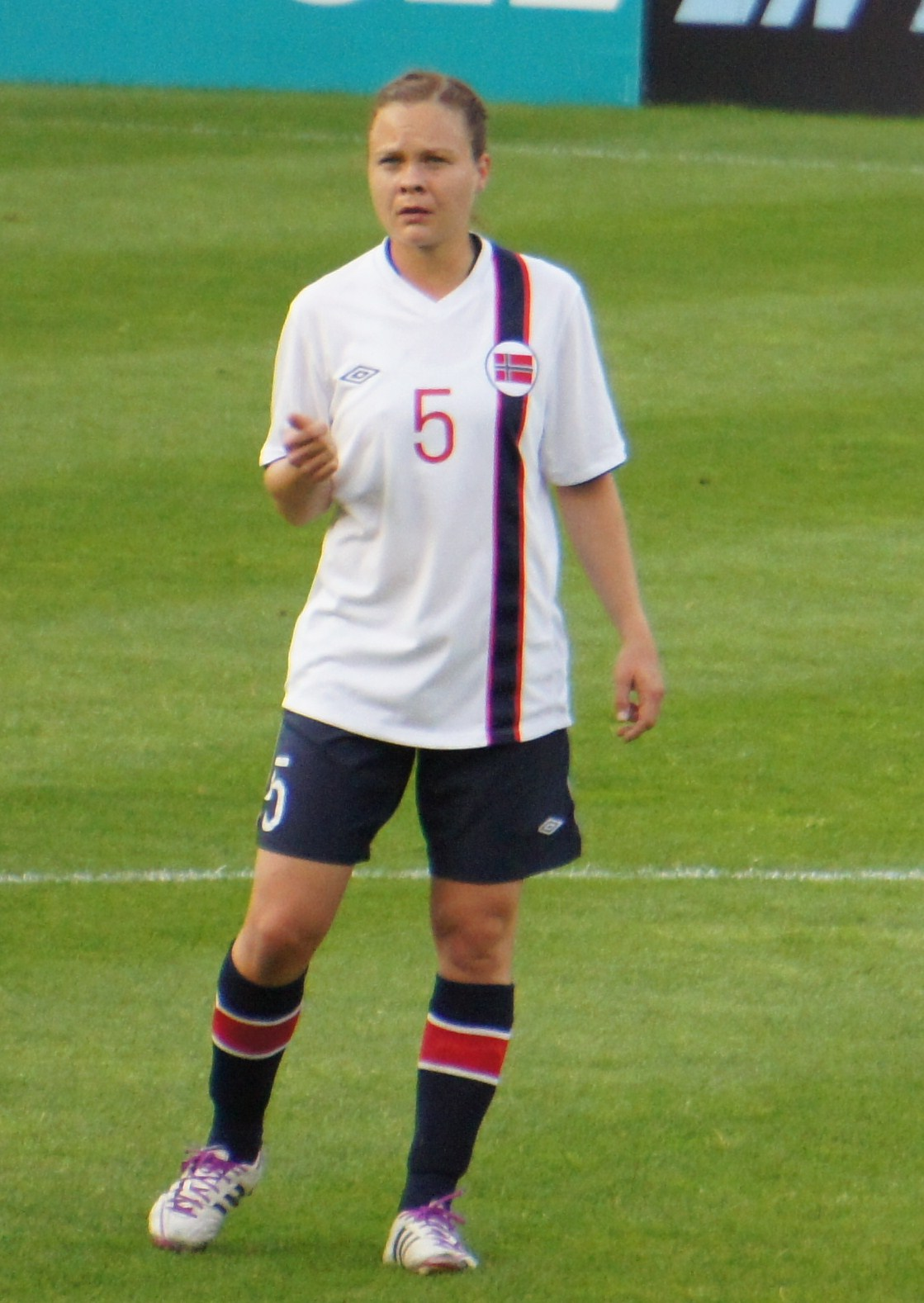

Personal information
- Full name: Toril Hetland Akerhaugen
- Date of birth: 5 March 1982 (age 44)
- Place of birth: Oslo, Norway
- Height: 1.64 m (5 ft 4 1/2 in)
- Position: Defender

Youth career
- Lørenskog

Senior career*
Years	Team	Apps	(Gls)
2000–2008	Asker		
2009–2015	Stabæk	96	(0)

International career^{‡}
2006–2013	Norway	59	(0)
Medal record
Women's football
Representing Norway
UEFA Women's Championship
Silver medal – second place	2013 Sweden	Team
- * Club domestic league appearances and goals as of 14:16, 14 September 2014 (UTC) ‡ National team caps and goals as of 14:16, 14 September 2014 (UTC)

Toril Hetland Akerhaugen (born 5 March 1982) is a Norwegian footballer who played for Stabæk and the Norway women's national football team. She is a central defender.

Akerhaugen played for Asker FK in the top Norwegian league, the Toppserien until at the end of 2008 the club encountered financial trouble and left the Toppserien. The club's players then joined a newly formed women's team within Stabæk. Stabæk's women finished second in the Toppserien in 2009 and 2011 and won the league title in 2010. In September 2011 Akerhaugen played in the UEFA Women's Champions League in the club's tie against FFC Frankfurt, in which Stabæk won their match in Oslo but lost the return match in Germany a week later. In November 2011 Stabæk won the Norwegian Cup Final.

She played 16 matches for Norway's Under-21 team between 2002 and 2006, and three matches for Norway's senior national team in 2006. She became a regular player in the national team in 2009 and was selected in the squad for UEFA Women's Euro 2009.

Akerhaugen was named in Norway's squad for UEFA Women's Euro 2013 by veteran coach Even Pellerud. She played in the final at Friends Arena, which Norway lost 1–0 to Germany.
