= Skjetten =

- Village
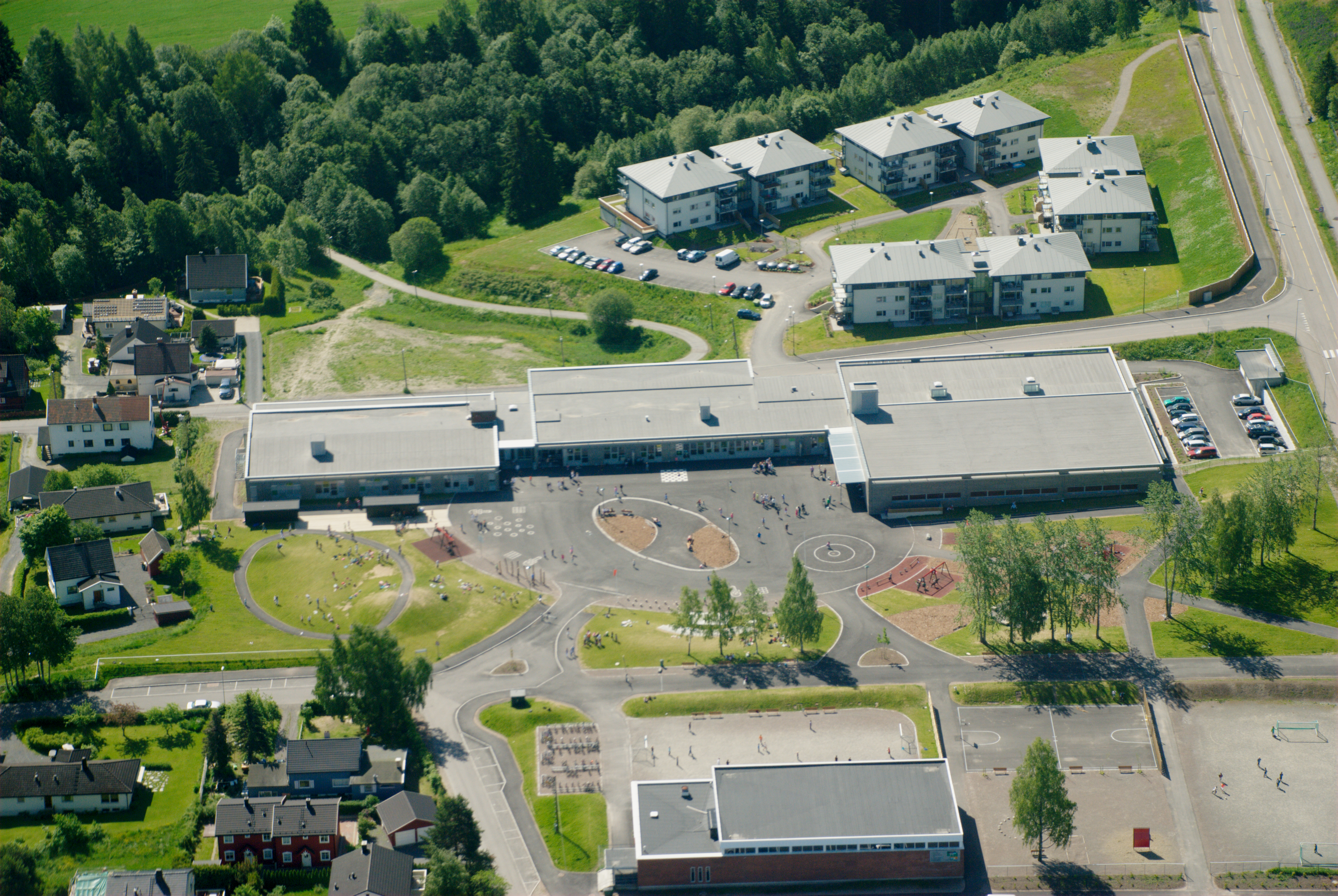
- Skjetten School at the north-east edge of Oslo

- Location in Akershus Skjetten (Norway)
- Coordinates: 59°58′22″N 11°00′13″E
- Country: Norway
- Region: Østlandet
- County: Akershus
- District: Romerike
- Municipality: Lillestrøm
- Time zone: UTC+01:00 (CET)
  - Summer (DST): UTC+02:00 (CEST)

Skjetten is a town in Lillestrøm municipality, Akershus county, Norway. It is located approximately 20 kilometres northeast of Oslo's city centre with a population of 10 000. Skjetten has five kindergartens, two primary schools and a secondary school in close proximity.

== Notable people ==
- Iver Bjerkestrand, skier
- Henrik Christiansen, swimmer
- Ingrid Hjelmseth, footballer
