= Maren Mjelde =

Norwegian footballer (born 1989)

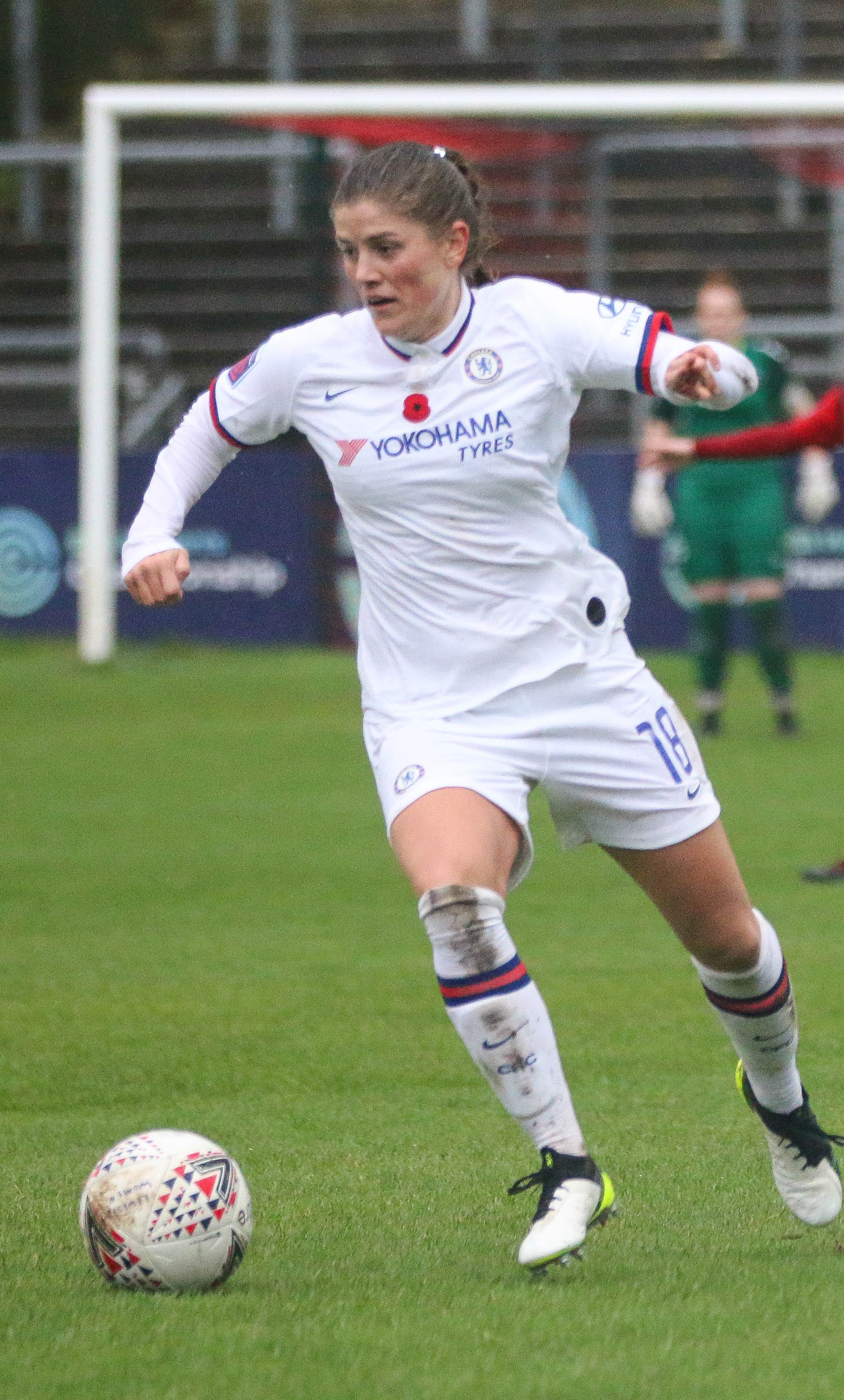
- Mjelde playing for Chelsea in 2019

Personal information
- Full name: Maren Nævdal Mjelde
- Date of birth: 6 November 1989 (age 37)
- Place of birth: Bergen, Norway
- Height: 1.65 m (5 ft 5 in)
- Positions: Defender; midfielder

Team information
- Current team: Arna-Bjørnar
- Number: 23

Youth career
- 1995–2004: Fri IL

Senior career*
Years	Team	Apps	(Gls)
2005–2012	Arna-Bjørnar	144	(42)
2013–2014	Turbine Potsdam	31	(2)
2014	Kopparbergs/Göteborg FC	9	(0)
2015–2016	Avaldsnes IL	44	(9)
2016–2024	Chelsea	79	(13)
2024	Arna-Bjørnar	12	(1)
2025	Everton	5	(1)
2025–	Arna-Bjørnar	16	(9)

International career
2004-2006	Norway U17	12	(1)
2005-2008	Norway U19	38	(8)
2008	Norway U20	8	(1)
2009	Norway U23	2	(0)
2007–2025	Norway	183	(20)
Medal record
Women's football
Representing Norway
UEFA Women's Championship
Bronze medal – third place	2009 Finland	Team
Silver medal – second place	2013 Sweden	Team
- * Club domestic league appearances and goals

Maren Nævdal Mjelde (Norwegian: [ˈmɑ̀ːrən ˈnæ̀ːvdɑɫ ˈmjɛ̀ldə]; born 6 November 1989) is a Norwegian professional footballer who plays as a defender or midfielder for Arna-Bjørnar.

She has won several titles while playing with Chelsea, including the Super League and the FA Cup. In addition, she played for Norway both in the Euro in 2009 and 2013, where Norway got bronze and silver, respectively.

== Club career ==
=== Arna-Bjørnar (2005–2012) ===
Mjelde was born in Bergen. She joined the Norwegian club, Arna-Bjørnar, as a 15-year-old in 2005. She made her debut in the Toppserien in 2006 at the age of 16 and played a total of 155 league games until 2012, in which she scored 49 goals. The club finished the 2012 Toppserien league in third place, earning the bronze medal that year.

=== Turbine Potsdam (2013–2014) ===
Mjelde transferred to the German club Turbine Potsdam before the 2013 season. She played all the club's matches as captain in the latter part of the season, when they reached the runner-up position in the German Cup and League competitions.

=== Kopparbergs/Göteborg FC ===
In May 2014 she announced that she would be moving to Kopparbergs/Göteborg FC in the Swedish Damallsvenskan on July 1, 2014. Mjelde signed a contract in Gothenburg until the end of 2015. She played nine games in the Damallsvenskan.

=== Avaldsnes IL ===
She then returned to Norway to play for Avaldsnes IL. With the club she was runner-up twice and took part in qualifying for the 2016/17 Champions League. With three wins, the club qualified for the round of 16, where they were defeated twice by Olympique Lyon.

=== Chelsea (2016–2024) ===
On 22 November 2016, Mjelde signed for Chelsea on a deal until 2018.

On 16 November 2019, Mjelde scored the only goal in Chelsea's historic win versus Manchester United, the first game ever played between these two women's teams in the Super League.

She suffered a knee injury in March 2021 that kept her out for a year.

On 30 March 2023, Chelsea played the second leg in the quarter finals of the Champions League against Lyon, last year’s winner. The score was 1–1 after full-time, so the match went to extra time and Däbritz scored for Lyon in the 110th minute, so Chelsea had to score. At the end of the added time for the second period, Chelsea got a penalty. Mjelde took the penalty and scored. The penalty was the last kick of the match, so it continued to penalty shoot-out, where Mjelde took the first penalty and scored again. Ann-Katrin Berger saved two penalties, which meant that Chelsea was through to the semi-final. During and after the match, Mjelde’s performance was praised by several, including the DAZN commentator, Emma Hayes, and Ian Wright. Hayes said that Mjelde is a Chelsea legend and that you can count on her in the biggest moments.

She won the league with Chelsea in the 2022–23 season.

On 3 May 2024, Mjelde announced her departure from Chelsea at the end of the 2023–24 season, after 7 years at the club.

=== Return to Arna-Bjørnar (2024) ===
On 13 August 2024, Norwegian club Arna-Bjørnar announced that Mjelde would return to her first professional club and join their squad for the ongoing season.

=== Everton (2025) ===
On 2 February 2025, Mjelde returned to the WSL after signing with Everton. On 9 May 2025, it was announced that she would be leaving Everton at the end of June after her contract expired.

=== Arna-Björnar (2025–) ===
In August 2025, Mjelde returned to Arna-Björnar.

== International career ==
Mjelde went through all youth national teams. In 2007 she took part in the European Championship with the U19 team, where she lost 3-0 to England in the semi-finals. Norway qualified for the U20 World Cup in Chile, where they played in all three group games. As third in the group, Norway was unable to qualify for the quarter-finals.

On October 27, 2007, Mjelde made her senior international debut for Norway against Russia. She was selected for 2009 Algarve Cup and then the UEFA Euro 2009, where she made five appearances and reached the semi-finals with her team. In 2010 she finally herself in the senior national team and was used 14 times, again at the Algarve Cup and then in World Cup qualification, where she scored her first goal for Norway against Ukraine. She took part in the 2011 Algarve Cup and the 2011 World Cup.

Mjelde was Norway's vice captain during 2011 and 2012 through the team's qualification campaign for the UEFA Euro 2013 and captained the side in many matches. In the tournament she played at right-back for the first time ever, and captained the team in their match in group B when Norway beat Germany 1–0 on 17 July. Norway lost the final 0–1 to Germany, and Mjelde was included in UEFA's Squad of the Tournament.

Mjelde was selected in Even Pellerud's squad for the 2015 World Cup. She scored the equalizer against Germany in a 1–1 draw in the group stage and played in Norway's second round defeat by England. Mjelde was also part of the squad for the 2015 World Cup . Her direct free kick against Germany was nominated for the most beautiful tournament goal.

At the start of qualifying for the 2017 European Championships, she was appointed captain of the team by new national coach Roger Finjord.

In qualification for the 2019 World Cup, she was one of the eight Norwegians who took part in all eight qualifying games. In the end they became group winners ahead of European champions Netherlands. She had her first tournament success by winning the 2019 Algarve Cup. On May 2 she was nominated for her third World Cup. With 136 international matches, she was the player with the most international matches in the squad. At the World Cup there were five more, in which she led her team onto the field as captain, but was eliminated with them in the quarter-finals against England.

Mjelde was part of the squad that was called up to the UEFA Euro 2022.

She played in decisive game for group victory in qualifying for the 2023 World Cup against Belgium, which was won 1-0, meaning the Norwegians qualified for the World Cup. On 19 June 2023, she was included in the 23-player Norwegian squad for the 2023 World Cup. She played in each of her team's games until they were eliminated in the Round of 16 by Japan.

On 16 June 2025, Mjelde was called up to the Norway squad for the UEFA Women's Euro 2025.

== Personal life ==
Mjelde's elder brother, Erik Mjelde, is a former footballer.

== Career statistics ==
=== Club ===
Club	Season	League			National cup (Note: Includes Norwegian Women's Cup, DFB Pokal, Svenska Cupen Damer, Women's FA Cup)		League cup (Note: Includes FA Women's League Cup)		Continental (Note: Includes UEFA Women's Champions League)		Total	
Club	Season	Division	Apps	Goals	Apps	Goals	Apps	Goals	Apps	Goals	Apps	Goals
Arna-Bjørnar	2005	Toppserien	2	0	2	0	—		—		4	0
Arna-Bjørnar	2006	Toppserien	18	0	0	0	—		—		18	0
Arna-Bjørnar	2007	Toppserien	22	3	0	0	—		—		22	3
Arna-Bjørnar	2008	Toppserien	22	8	0	0	—		—		22	8
Arna-Bjørnar	2009	Toppserien	15	6	0	0	—		—		15	6
Arna-Bjørnar	2010	Toppserien	21	6	0	0	—		—		21	6
Arna-Bjørnar	2011	Toppserien	22	11	1	0	—		—		23	11
Arna-Bjørnar	2012	Toppserien	22	8	3	3	—		—		25	11
Arna-Bjørnar	2024	Toppserien	12	1							12	1
Arna-Bjørnar	2025	Toppserien	9	6							9	6
Arna-Bjørnar	2026	Toppserien	7	3							7	3
Arna-Bjørnar	Total		160	51	6	3	—		—		166	54
Turbine Potsdam	2012–13	Frauen-Bundesliga	11	0	2	0	—		—		13	0
Turbine Potsdam	2013–14	Frauen-Bundesliga	20	2	1	0	—		8	2	29	4
Turbine Potsdam	Total		31	2	3	0	—		8	2	42	4
Kopparbergs/Göteborg FC	2014	Damallsvenskan	9	0	0	0	—		—		9	0
Avaldsnes IL	2015	Toppserien	22	4	5	2	—		—		27	6
Avaldsnes IL	2016	Toppserien	22	5	3	5	—		5	1	30	11
Avaldsnes IL	Total		44	9	8	7	—		5	1	57	17
Chelsea	2017	Women's Super League	8	2	?	?	—		—		8	2
Chelsea	2017–18	Women's Super League	17	4	?	?	5	0	8	0	30	4
Chelsea	2018–19	Women's Super League	7	0	?	?	2	0	5	2	14	2
Chelsea	2019–20	Women's Super League	14	4	2	0	5	1	—		21	5
Chelsea	2020–21	Women's Super League	15	2	0	0	4	0	3	2	22	4
Chelsea	2021–22	Women's Super League	4	0	2	0	0	0	2	0	8	0
Chelsea	2022–23	Women's Super League	7	1	4	1	1	0	6	2	18	4
Chelsea	2023–24	Women's Super League	7	0	0	0	1	0	2	1	10	1
Chelsea	Total		79	13	8	1	18	1	26	7	131	22
Everton	2024–25	Women's Super League	5	1	1	0	2	0	—		8	1
Career total			340	77	26	11	20	1	39	10	425	99

=== International ===
As of match played 10 July 2025

Appearances and goals by national team and year
National team	Year	Apps	Goals
Norway	2007	1	0
Norway	2009	11	0
Norway	2010	14	1
Norway	2011	12	0
Norway	2012	10	4
Norway	2013	16	1
Norway	2014	15	4
Norway	2015	16	2
Norway	2016	13	4
Norway	2017	15	2
Norway	2018	9	1
Norway	2019	14	0
Norway	2020	4	0
Norway	2022	10	1
Norway	2023	14	0
Norway	2024	4	0
Norway	2025	4	0
Total		182	20

Scores and results list Norway's goal tally first, score column indicates score after each Mjelde goal.

List of international goals scored by Maren Mjelde
No.	Date	Venue	Opponent	Score	Result	Competition
1	16 June 2012	Sarpsborg Stadion, Sarpsborg, Norway	Bulgaria	3–0	11–0	UEFA Women's Euro 2013 qualifying
2	16 June 2012	Sarpsborg Stadion, Sarpsborg, Norway	Bulgaria	5–0	11–0	UEFA Women's Euro 2013 qualifying
3	20 June 2012	Sarpsborg Stadion, Sarpsborg, Norway	Northern Ireland	2–0	2–0	UEFA Women's Euro 2013 qualifying
4	19 September 2012	Ullevaal Stadion, Oslo, Norway	Iceland	1–0	2–1	UEFA Women's Euro 2013 qualifying
5	26 October 2013	Sarpsborg Stadion, Sarpsborg, Norway	Albania	3–0	7–0	2015 FIFA Women's World Cup qualification
6	14 June 2014	Brann Stadion, Bergen, Norway	Greece	3–0	6–0	2015 FIFA Women's World Cup qualification
7	18 June 2014	Estádio Marcolino de Castro, Santa Maria da Feira, Portugal	Portugal	2–0	2–0	2015 FIFA Women's World Cup qualification
8	13 September 2014	Niko Dovana Stadium, Durrës, Albania	Albania	2–0	11–0	2015 FIFA Women's World Cup qualification
9	13 September 2014	Niko Dovana Stadium, Durrës, Albania	Albania	6–0	11–0	2015 FIFA Women's World Cup qualification
10	11 June 2015	TD Place Stadium, Ottawa, Canada	Germany	1–1	1–1	2015 FIFA Women's World Cup
12	23 October 2015	Color Line Stadion, Ålesund, Norway	Wales	4–0	4–0	UEFA Women's Euro 2017 qualifying
13	5 March 2016	Het Kasteel, Rotterdam, Netherlands	Netherlands	2–0	4–1	2016 UEFA Women's Olympic Qualifying Tournament
14	2 June 2016	Ullevaal Stadion, Oslo, Norway	Austria	1–1	2–2	UEFA Women's Euro 2017 qualifying
15	15 September 2016	Aker Stadion, Molde, Norway	Kazakhstan	5–0	10–0	UEFA Women's Euro 2017 qualifying
16	15 September 2016	Aker Stadion, Molde, Norway	Kazakhstan	7–0	10–0	UEFA Women's Euro 2017 qualifying
17	11 July 2017	Stade Louis-Dugauguez, Sedan, France	France	1–1	1–1	Friendly
18	19 September 2017	Sarpsborg Stadion, Sarpsborg, Norway	Slovakia	5–0	6–1	2019 FIFA Women's World Cup qualification
19	2 March 2018	VRS António Sports Complex, Vila Real de Santo António, Portugal	China	2–0	2–0	2018 Algarve Cup
20	6 September 2022	Ullevaal Stadion, Oslo, Norway	Albania	3–0	5–0	2023 FIFA Women's World Cup qualification

== Honours ==
=== Club ===
Arna-Bjørnar

- Kniksens Minnefond 2006
- Young player of the year 2007

1. FFC Turbine Potsdam

- Bundesliga: runner up 2013
- DFB-Hallenpokal for women: 2013, 2014

Chelsea

- FA WSL: 2017–18, 2019–20, 2020–21, 2021–22, 2022–23, 2023–24
- Women's FA Cup: 2017–18, 2020–21, 2021–22, 2022–23
- FA Women's League Cup: 2019–20, 2020–21
- FA Community Shield: 2020

=== National teams ===
U19

- Silver in the Euro 2009

Norway's national team

- Bronze in the Euro 2009
- Silver in 2013
- All star team in Euro 2009
- Algarve Cup 2019

== See also ==
- List of women's footballers with 100 or more international caps
