= Iver Bjerkestrand =

Norwegian alpine skier (born 1987)

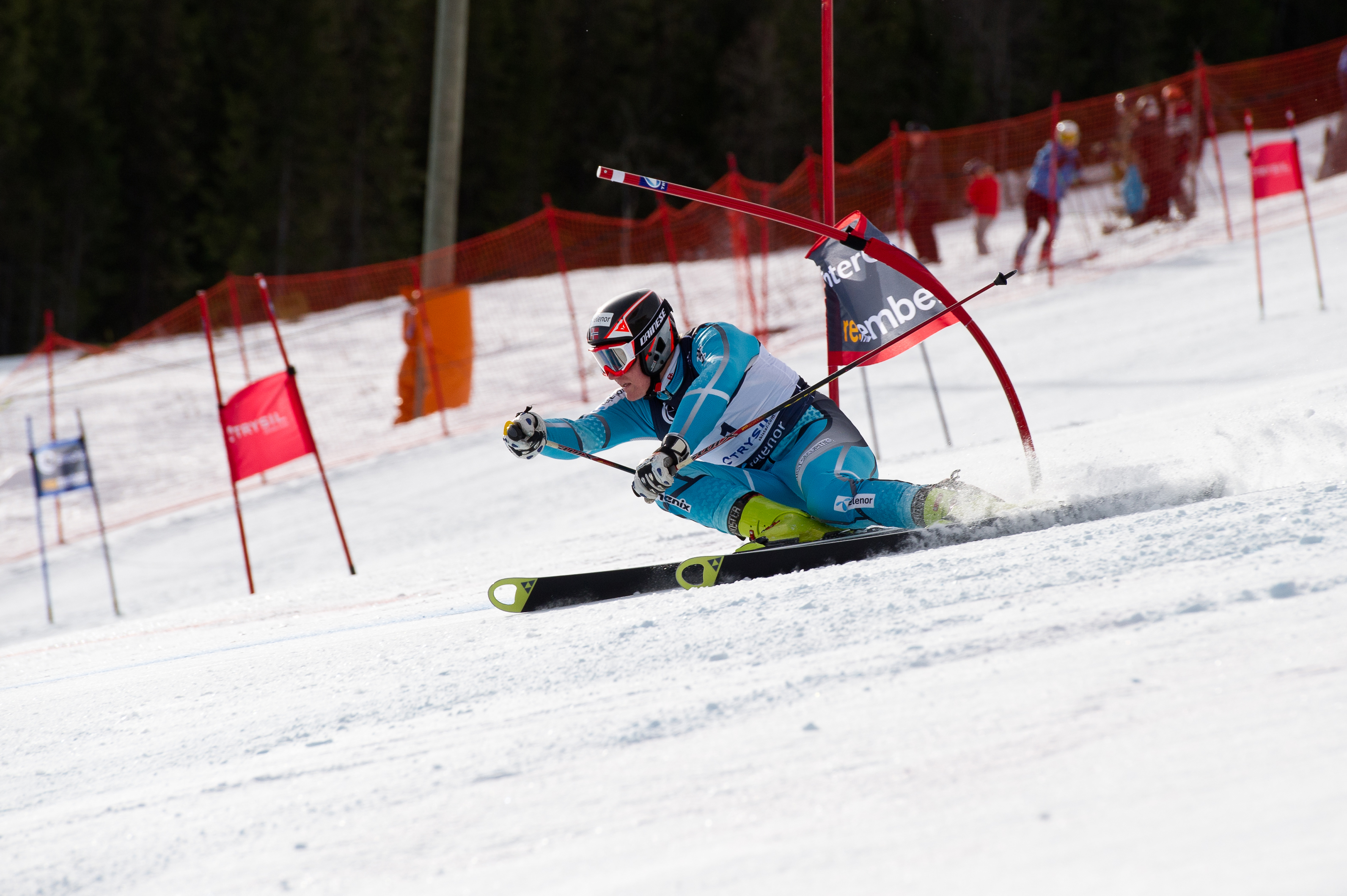
Iver Bjerkestrand During giant slalom Norway 2011

Iver Bjerkestrand (born 1987) is a retired Norwegian alpine skier.

Bjerkstrand is from Skjetten, Norway. He made his FIS Alpine Ski World Cup debut in October 2008 in Sölden. Among his ten first World Cup races he only managed to finished one. In the eleventh race he collected his first World Cup points with a 26th place in Kvitfjell. These would remain his only World Cup points until finishing 17th in March 2013 in Kvitfjell, which was also his last World Cup outing.

He represented the alpine skiing club Nero.
