= Leni Larsen Kaurin =

Norwegian footballer (born 1981)

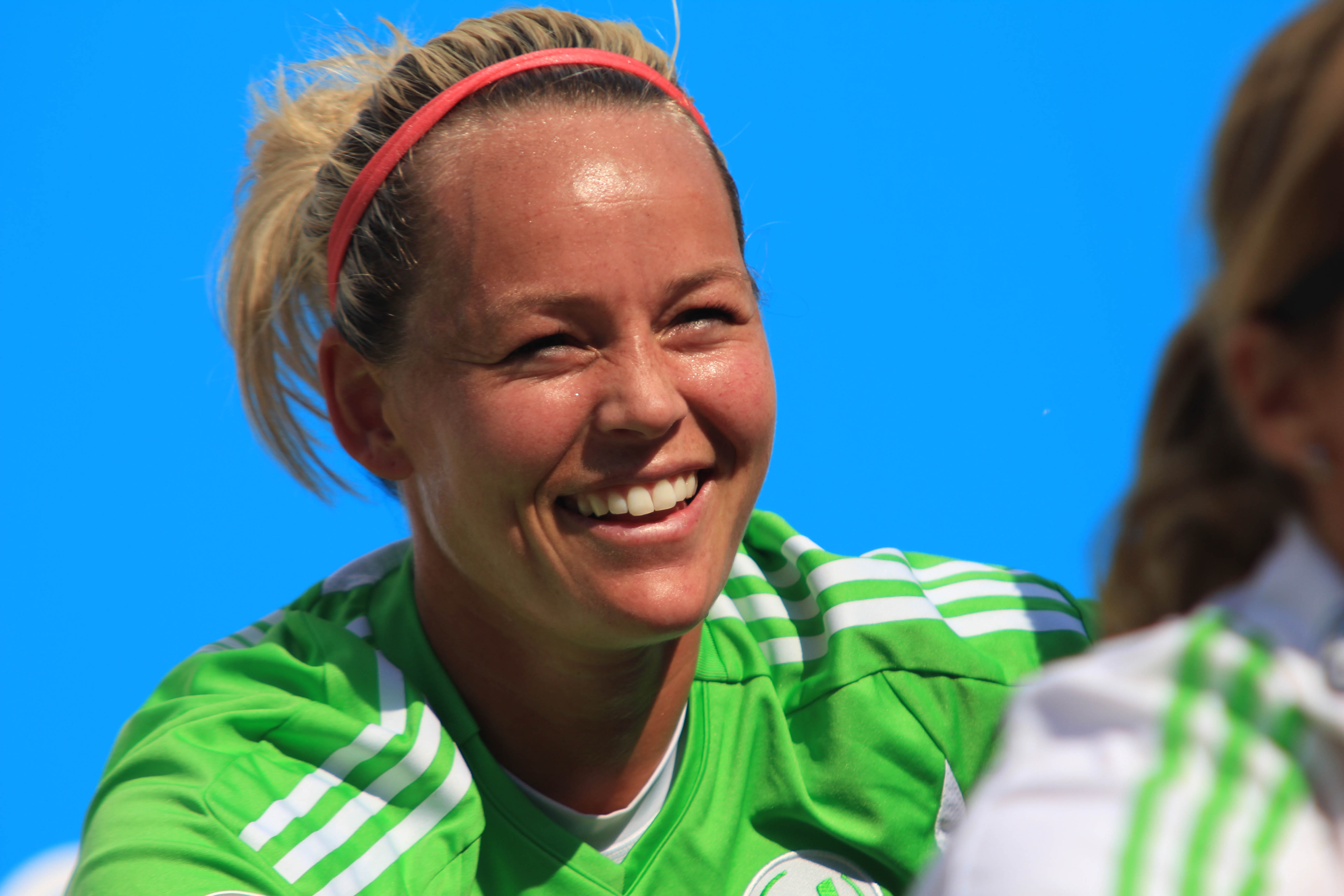

Personal information
- Full name: Leni Larsen Kaurin
- Date of birth: 21 March 1981 (age 45)
- Place of birth: Ålesund, Norway
- Height: 1.66 m (5 ft 5 in)
- Positions: Midfielder; winger

Youth career
- Skarbøvik IF
- Fortuna Ålesund

Senior career*
| Years | Team | Apps | (Gls) |
| 1998–2003 | Asker | | |
| 2004 | Team Strømmen | | |
| 2005–2007 | Asker | | |
| 2007–2009 | Turbine Potsdam | 41 | (5) |
| 2010 | FFC Frankfurt | 8 | (0) |
| 2010–2012 | VfL Wolfsburg | 22 | (1) |
| 2012 | Ottawa Fury | 4 | (0) |
| 2012–2014 | Stabæk | 18 | (1) |
| 2015-2016 | Fløya | 0 | (0) |

International career^{‡}
| 2001–2013 | Norway | 98 | (5) |
Medal record
Women's football
Representing Norway
UEFA Women's Championship
| Silver medal – second place | 2013 Sweden | Team |
- * Club domestic league appearances and goals ‡ National team caps and goals as of 15:43, 28 July 2013 (UTC)

Leni Larsen Kaurin (born 21 March 1981) is a Norwegian former footballer who played as a midfielder. She made almost 100 appearances for the Norway women's national football team. Kaurin represented her country in the 2009 and 2013 editions of the UEFA Women's Championship, as well as the 2007 and 2011 FIFA Women's World Cups. She also played at the 2008 Olympic Football Tournament. At club level she played for domestic teams Fortuna Ålesund, Asker, Team Strømmen, Stabæk and Fløya. She also played for German Frauen-Bundesliga clubs Turbine Potsdam, FFC Frankfurt and VfL Wolfsburg as well as a short stint in the North American W-League with Ottawa Fury.

== Club career ==
Kaurin was born in Ålesund, West Norway. She began her career in the youth team at Skarbøvik IF, along with male footballer John Arne Riise, who was in the year above her at school.

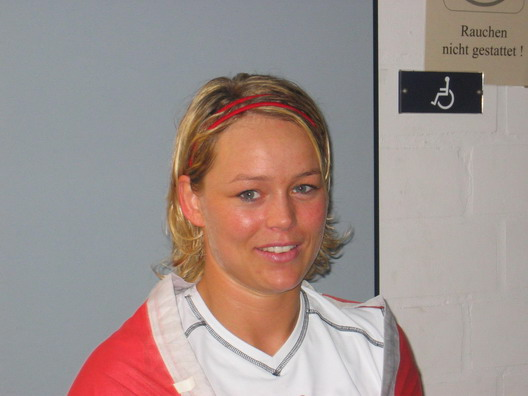
Kaurin in January 2008

She joined 1. FFC Turbine Potsdam from Asker, at the end of 2007. She was then the only Norwegian woman footballer playing in Germany. On 2 February 2010 she announced that she would transfer to 1. FFC Frankfurt in order to have more match-time in the German top women's division and maintain her international career. Shortly afterwards she transferred again to VfL Wolfsburg.

After four-and-a-half years in Germany, Kaurin decided to return to Norway and accepted a contract from Stabæk. She played for Ottawa Fury in the North American W-League during July 2012, to get match practice ahead of Stabæk's UEFA Women's Champions League campaign.

When Kaurin was released by Stabæk after the 2013 season, she alleged that the team's male coach had sexually harassed her which caused her to play badly. In 2014, she played for and coached Fløya, who were battling relegation from the 1. divisjon. In 2016 she came out of retirement to sign for minnows Bærum SK, at the same time becoming their player developer.

== International career ==
Kaurin scored 10 times in 37 international matches for Norway's age-limited teams before her debut in the senior national team, a 5–1 win over Finland at the 2001 Algarve Cup. She was disappointed to be one of the last players to be cut from the 2003 FIFA Women's World Cup squad. From the beginning of 2006 she began playing more regularly for Norway.

In September 2007 Kaurin played a leading role on the right wing in Norway's campaign at the FIFA Women's World Cup 2007 tournament in China, where the team achieved fourth place. She is known for her ability to dribble past defenders and pass accurately into the penalty area, and as a result she assists in scoring many goals.

On 9 June 2008 she was named to the Norwegian roster for the 2008 Summer Olympics to be held in Beijing, China.

On 6 August 2008 she scored the first goal for Norway, playing in Qinhuangdao against the United States in the opening Olympics soccer match for both teams, a match Norway won 2–0. The goal, after 61 seconds, was also the fastest goal in Olympic soccer history, beating the former record of four minutes. But the record only lasted six days before being broken by the United States' Heather O'Reilly.

She played for Norway at UEFA Women's Euro 2009, where the team reached the semi-finals. In May 2011 Kaurin was selected to join Norway's squad to go to the FIFA Women's World Cup 2011 in Germany in June–July 2011.

She was called up to be part of the national team for UEFA Women's Euro 2013. In the final at Friends Arena, Kaurin was an 85th-minute substitute. Anja Mittag's goal gave the Germans their sixth successive European title.
