= Ingrid Hjelmseth =

Norwegian footballer (born 1980)

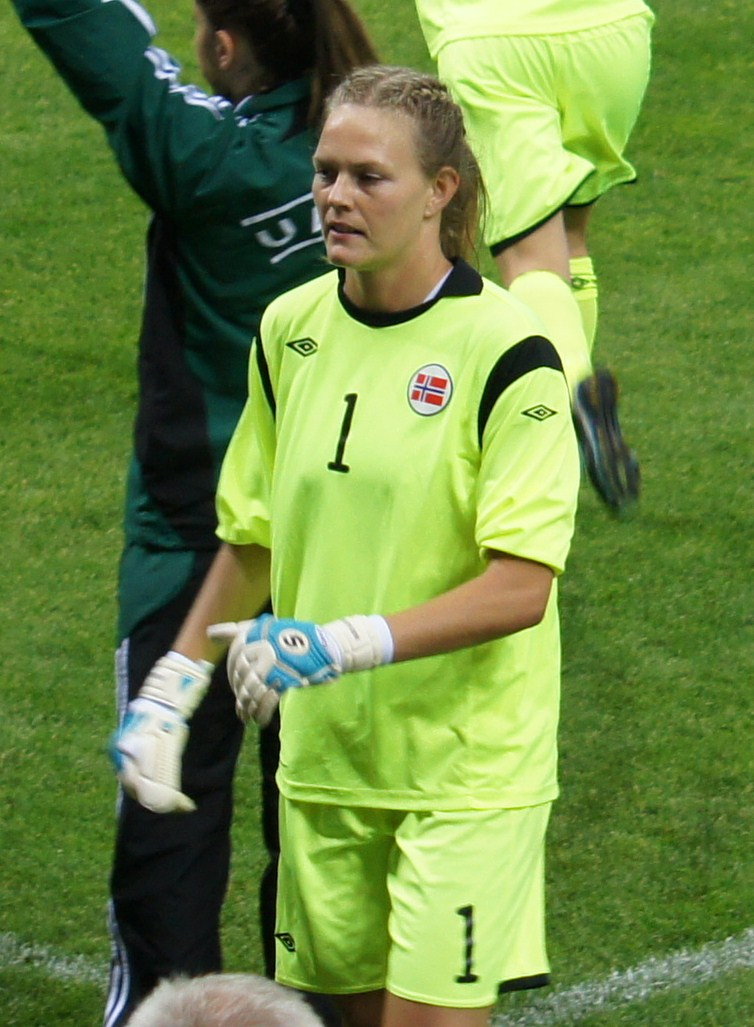
- Hjelmseth with Norway

Personal information
- Date of birth: 10 April 1980 (age 46)
- Place of birth: Lørenskog, Norway
- Height: 1.73 m (5 ft 8 in)
- Position: Goalkeeper

Youth career
- Skjetten

Senior career*
| Years | Team | Apps | (Gls) |
| 1999–2006 | Trondheims-Ørn | 121 | (0) |
| 2007–2008 | Asker | 36 | (0) |
| 2009–2019 | Stabæk | 204 | (0) |
| Total | | 361 | (0) |

International career
| 2003–2019 | Norway | 138 | (0) |
Medal record
Women's football
Representing Norway
UEFA Women's Championship
| Silver medal – second place | 2005 England | Team |
| Silver medal – second place | 2013 Sweden | Team |
- * Club domestic league appearances and goals

Ingrid Hjelmseth (born 10 April 1980) is a Norwegian former footballer who played as a goalkeeper. She was Norway's No. 1 for a decade, and her former club Stabæk name her a legend.

== Career ==
Originally from Skjetten, she was the Norway national team's reserve keeper from 2003 onwards, and played for Trondheims-Ørn in the elite Toppserien league for seven seasons while at university, with 217 appearances for the club. In 2006, her last year in goal at Trondheims-Ørn, the club conceded only ten goals in the entire Toppserien season of (at that time) 18 matches.

At the beginning of 2007 she moved back to Oslo to start work as a professional engineer at Det Norske Veritas and now works in DNV Software. At the same time she joined Asker FK as first keeper. After a good start to the season she tore a collateral knee ligament in June 2007 which kept her out of football for several months, and she was not selected for the Norway squad to go to the World Cup tournament in China in 2007.

Hjelmseth went to the 2008 Summer Olympics as Norway's third keeper, in the reserve squad of four who were only to be used if a player in the main squad of 18 had to leave for medical reasons.

At the end of 2008 Asker's first team was disbanded after continuing financial troubles at the club, and most of the players including Hjelmseth joined Stabæk IF's newly formed women's team Stabæk Fotball Kvinner for the 2009 season. The new team thus became part of one of Norway's largest sports clubs.

In August 2009 Hjelmseth was designated Norway's first-choice goalkeeper for the UEFA Women's Euro 2009 held in Finland between Europe's leading twelve footballing nations. In the group stage Norway were placed third, and they advanced to the quarter-finals where they beat Sweden 3–1 contrary to most predictions, only to fall in the semifinal against the reigning champions Germany. Hjelmseth was widely praised for her part in what was seen as a successful campaign. By the end of 2011 she had completed three seasons as Norway's first keeper and 52 matches for Norway in which she had received one yellow card.

Hjelmseth became a Toppserien League champion in 2010 with Stabæk, conceding eight goals in the season of 22 matches. The team qualified to play in the UEFA Women's Champions League in 2011. Also in 2010 she set a new goalkeeping record by conceding no goals at home during an entire season.

In 2011 Stabæk again qualified for the Champions League by finishing second in the Toppserien, and also won the Norwegian Cup on 5 November in a match that went to extra time and penalties. Hjelmseth's part in the match was vital and she saved two penalties in the final shootout.

Hjelmseth was named in Norway's squad for UEFA Women's Euro 2013 by veteran coach Even Pellerud. She played in the final at Friends Arena, which Norway lost 1–0 to Germany.

Ahead of the 2015 FIFA Women's World Cup, veteran Hjelmseth admitted that she was considering retirement if Norway's performance did not achieve a place at the 2016 Rio Olympics. She intended to start playing outfield in the lower divisions at the completion of her national team career.

== Honours ==
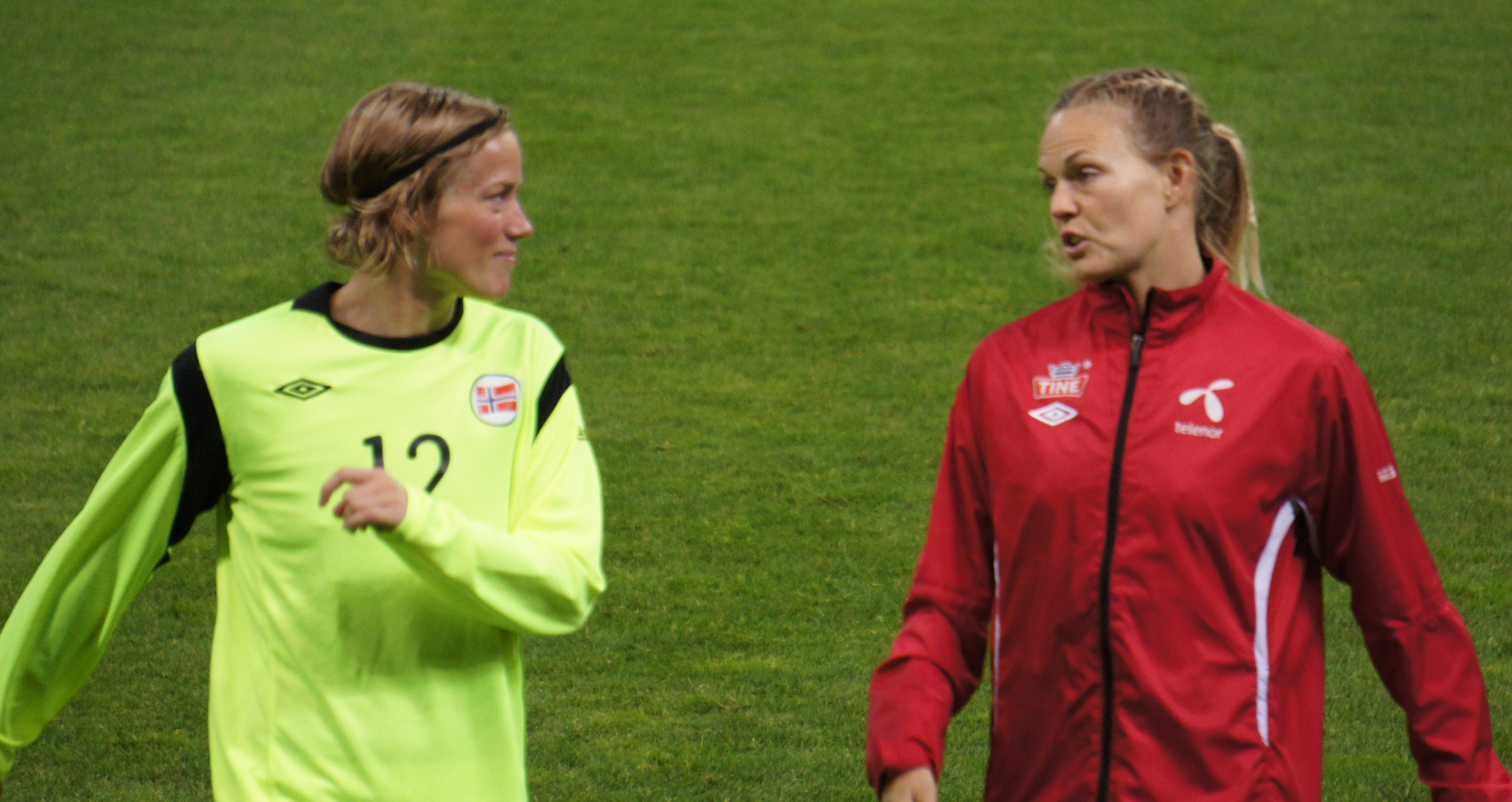
Hjelmseth (right) with Silje Vesterbekkmo in June 2013

Trondheims-Ørn

- Toppserien: 2000, 2001, 2003
- Norwegian Women's Cup: 1999, 2001, 2002

Stabæk

- Toppserien: 2010, 2013
- Norwegian Women's Cup: 2011, 2012, 2013

Norway

- UEFA Women's Championship Runner-up: 2005, 2013

Individual

- UEFA Squad of the Tournament: UEFA Women's Euro 2013

== See also ==
- List of women's footballers with 100 or more international caps
