= Teodora Albon =

Romanian football referee

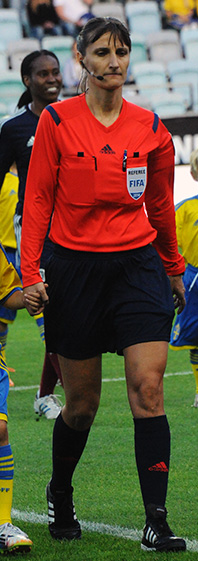
- Born: 2 December 1977 (age 48); Cisnădie, Romania
- Other occupation: Sports teacher

Domestic
Years	League	Role
2007–	Liga I	Referee

International
Years	League	Role
2003–	FIFA listed	Referee

Teodora Albon (born 2 December 1977) is a Romanian football referee. Albon started her refereeing career in 2000 while still playing for Clujana Cluj-Napoca, where she was coached by her husband, Mirel Albon, a former Liga I assistant referee.

She refereed the 2009 UEFA Women's Under-19 Championship Final between Sweden and England. She refereed (accompanied by a team of three Romanian match officials – assistants Petruța Iugulescu and Mihaela Țepușa, and fourth official Cristina Dorcioman) of the 2013 UEFA Women's Champions League Final at Stamford Bridge in London, where VfL Wolfsburg beat Lyon 1–0 in regular time, and also officiated at two matches during UEFA Women's Euro 2013. She also refereed the 2011–12 UEFA Women's Champions League semi-final between Lyon and Turbine Potsdam, and the 2012–13 UEFA Women's Champions League quarter-final, between Arsenal and Torres. Additionally, she was a referee for the 2015 FIFA Women's World Cup in Canada.

Preceded by (Sweden) Jenny Palmqvist	2013 UEFA Women's Champions League Final (Romania) Teodora Albon	Succeeded by (Ukraine) Kateryna Monzul
Preceded by (Romania) Cristina Dorcioman	2009 UEFA Women's Under-19 Championship Final (Romania) Teodora Albon	Succeeded by (Poland) Karolina Radzik-Johan
