= Cathrine Dekkerhus =

Norwegian footballer (born 1992)

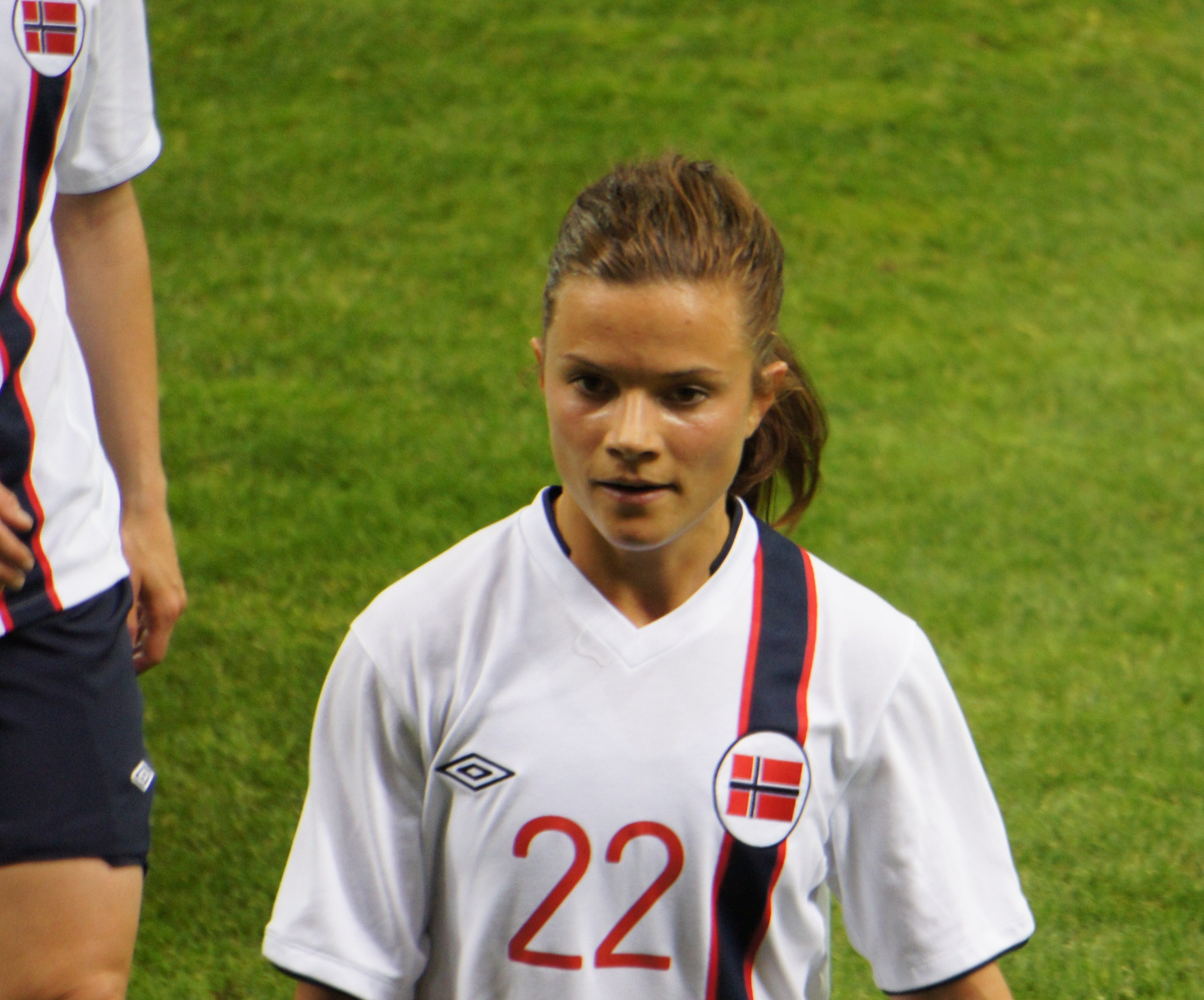

Personal information
- Full name: Cathrine Høegh Dekkerhus
- Date of birth: 17 September 1992 (age 34)
- Place of birth: Kongsvinger, Norway
- Height: 1.71 m (5 ft 7 1/2 in)
- Position: Midfielder

Team information
- Current team: Lillestrøm
- Number: 20

Senior career*
Years	Team	Apps	(Gls)
2008–2010	Lillestrøm		
2011–2017	Stabæk	86	(21)
2019–	Lillestrøm	9	(0)

International career
2013–2014	Norway	20	(0)
Medal record
Women's football
Representing Norway
UEFA Women's Championship
Silver medal – second place	2013 Sweden	Team
- * Club domestic league appearances and goals

Cathrine Høegh Dekkerhus (born 17 September 1992) is a Norwegian football midfielder who plays in the Toppserien for Lillestrøm. She previously played for Stabæk Fotball, with whom she played in the Champions League, scoring a winner against 1.FFC Frankfurt in the 2012 season's round of 32. She previously played for Lillestrøm SK.

As a junior international she won a silver in the 2011 U-19 European Championship.

Dekkerhus was named in Norway's squad for UEFA Women's Euro 2013 by veteran coach Even Pellerud. She played in the final at Friends Arena, which Norway lost 1–0 to Germany.
