= Guldfågeln Arena =

Football stadium in Kalmar, Sweden

Kalmar Arena
- Guldfågeln Arena

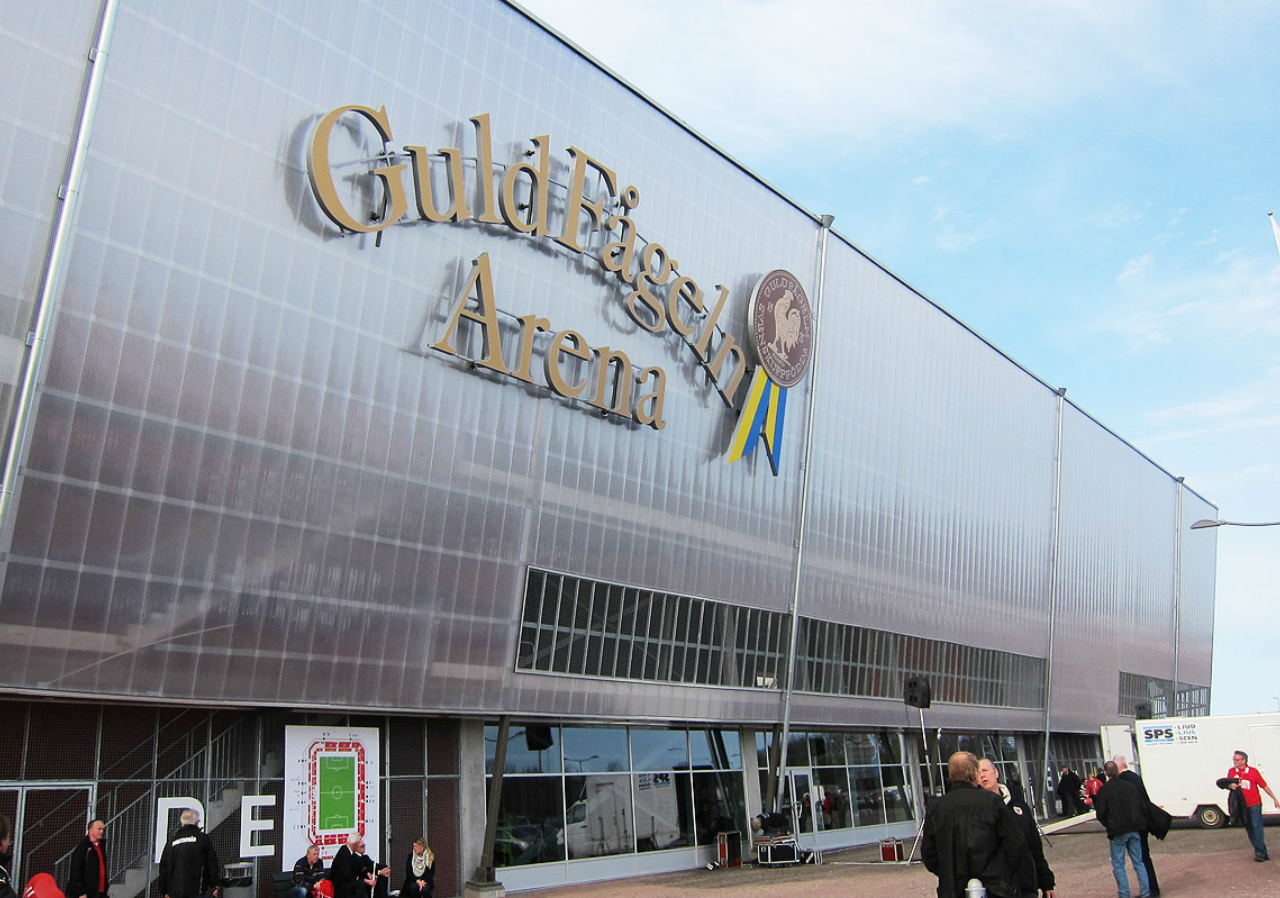
- The front of the stadium
- Interactive map of Kalmar Arena
- Location: Kalmar, Sweden
- Coordinates: 56.6912°N 16.3149°E
- Owner: City of Kalmar
- Capacity: 12,150 of which 10,650 are seated
- Surface: Hybrid grass, 105 x 68 meter

Construction
- Groundbreaking: December 12, 2009
- Opened: April 11, 2011
- Cost: 250 million SEK
- Architect: Tengbom
- Main contractor: NCC

Tenants
- Kalmar FF (2011–present); Sweden national under-21 football team (2012–)

Guldfågeln Arena is a football stadium in Kalmar, Sweden and the home of Allsvenskan club Kalmar FF. The stadium is located in the area known as Hansa City, in the North West of Kalmar. The arena was completed within the date of March 15, 2011 as expected. The first game, an Allsvenskan match between Kalmar FF and Djurgårdens IF held on April 11, was attended by 11,852 fans and won by Kalmar 3–2.

Kalmar Arena was also one of the arenas used for the UEFA Women's Euro 2013, as Kalmar Arena, with three matches in the preliminaries as well as one quarter final.

== History ==
The football stadium consists of 11,000 seats under roof, and has a natural grass playing field grown in place. Beside the football pitch in the stadium, the construction work also includes three pitches that will be used for practise sessions only (two with natural grass and one with artificial turf).

Kalmar Arena cost about 250 million Swedish kronor and was financed jointly by Kalmar FF, Kalmar Municipality and the real estate company Sveafastigheter. Kalmar Arena replaced Fredriksskans as Kalmar FF's home ground.

== See also ==
- List of football stadiums in Sweden
- Lists of stadiums
