= Cristina Dorcioman =

Romanian football referee

- Born: 7 August 1974 (age 52); Câmpulung Muscel, Romania
- Other occupation: Sports teacher

Domestic
Years	League	Role
2007–	Liga I	Referee

International
Years	League	Role
2002–	FIFA listed	Referee

Cristina Dorcioman (born 7 August 1974) is a Romanian football referee.

On 26 July 2013, Dorcioman was announced referee for the 2013 UEFA Women's Euro Final between Germany and Norway at Friends Arena in Solna, Sweden. During the competition, she has taken charge of two group stage matches.

She also refereed the semi-final first leg between Duisburg and Turbine Potsdam in the 2010–11 UEFA Women's Champions League season, and the other three same competition quarter-finals.

In 2009 she went to the UEFA Women's Euro and a year before was in charge for the 2008 UEFA Women's Under-19 Championship Final between Italy and Norway.

Preceded by (Czech Republic) Dagmar Damková	2013 UEFA Women's Euro Final (Romania) Cristina Dorcioman	Succeeded by (Switzerland) Esther Staubli
Preceded by (Finland) Kirsi Savolainen	2008 UEFA Women's Under-19 Championship Final (Romania) Cristina Dorcioman	Succeeded by (Romania) Teodora Albon
