= UEFA Women's Euro 2013 =

2013 edition of the UEFA Women's Euro

Europamästerskapet i fotboll för damer 2013

Tournament details
- Host country: Sweden
- Dates: 10–28 July
- Teams: 12
- Venues: 7 (in 7 host cities)

Final positions
- Champions: Germany (8th title)
- Runners-up: Norway

Tournament statistics
- Matches played: 25
- Goals scored: 56 (2.24 per match)
- Attendance: 216,888 (8,676 per match)
- Top scorer: (Sweden) Lotta Schelin (5 goals)
- Best player: (Germany) Nadine Angerer

The 2013 UEFA Women's Championship, commonly referred to as the 2013 Women's Euros or just the 2013 Euros, was the 11th European Championship for women's national football teams organised by UEFA. The final tournament, held in Sweden from 10 to 28 July 2013, became the most-watched in the history of the Women's Euros. It concluded with Germany, the defending champions, winning their sixth consecutive and record-extending eighth overall Women's Euro title after defeating Norway in the final.

Sweden was selected as hosts by UEFA's Executive Committee in 2010, meaning their team automatically qualified for the final tournament. The other eleven finalists were decided by a qualifying competition, featuring 44 teams, staged between March 2011 to October 2012. It was the last time the finals featured twelve teams, as from 2017 onwards they would be expanded to include sixteen teams.

== Host selection ==
Sweden was awarded the hosting of the tournament on 4 October 2010 at a meeting of the UEFA Executive Committee in Minsk, Belarus. The only rival host bid came from the Netherlands. Several other European national associations, including Switzerland, Bulgaria and Poland, had shown interest in staging the tournament but did not submit final applications. Sweden had previously co-hosted the tournament in 1997 alongside Norway.

== Qualification ==
A total of 44 teams entered the qualification process to compete for the eleven available places in the final tournament, alongside host nation Sweden, who qualified automatically. Six teams were firstly eliminated during an eight-team preliminary round staged in Macedonia (now North Macedonia) and Malta on 3–8 March 2011.

On 14 March 2011 38 teams – the 36 top-ranked nations (according to their UEFA coefficient) and the two teams advancing from the preliminary round – were then drawn into seven qualifying groups at a draw in Nyon, Switzerland. Matches in these qualifying groups began in September 2011 and concluded a year later. The seven group winners automatically qualified for the final tournament along with the best-ranked runners-up. The remaining six runners-up entered into two-legged play-offs held in October 2012 to determine the final line-up. The following twelve teams participated in the final tournament:

Team	Method of qualification	Date of qualification	Finals appearance	Last appearance	Previous best performance	FIFA ranking at start of event
Sweden	Hosts	4 October 2010	9th	2009	Champions (1984)	5
Italy	Group 1 winner	16 June 2012	10th	2009	Runners-up (1993, 1997)	12
Germany	Group 2 winner	16 June 2012	9th	2009	Champions (1989, 1991, 1995, 1997, 2001, 2005, 2009)	2
Norway	Group 3 winner	19 September 2012	10th	2009	Champions (1987, 1993)	11
France	Group 4 winner	15 September 2012	5th	2009	Quarter-finals (2009)	6
Finland	Group 5 winner	15 September 2012	3rd	2009	Semi-finals (2005)	21
England	Group 6 winner	19 September 2012	7th	2009	Runners-up (1984, 2009)	7
Denmark	Group 7 winner	19 September 2012	8th	2009	Semi-finals (1984, 1991, 1993, 2001)	13
Netherlands	Best runner-up	19 September 2012	2nd	2009	Semi-finals (2009)	14
Spain	Play-off winner	24 October 2012	2nd	1997	Semi-finals (1997)	18
Russia	Play-off winner	25 October 2012	4th	2009	Group Stage (1997, 2001, 2009)	22
Iceland	Play-off winner	25 October 2012	2nd	2009	Group Stage (2009)	15

== Venues ==
The tournament was staged at seven venues in seven different towns with each group being staged at two different venues. At some venues, the capacity was reduced during the championship.

Gothenburg	Solna	Norrköping
Gamla Ullevi	Friends Arena	Nya Parken
Capacity: 16,600	Capacity: 50,000	Capacity: 10,500
3 group matches, 1 semi-final	Final	3 group matches, 1 semi-final
Linköping	UEFA Women's Euro 2013 (Southern Sweden)	Kalmar
Linköping Arena	UEFA Women's Euro 2013 (Southern Sweden)	Guldfågeln Arena
Capacity: 7,300	UEFA Women's Euro 2013 (Southern Sweden)	Capacity: 10,900
3 group matches, 1 quarter-final	UEFA Women's Euro 2013 (Southern Sweden)	3 group matches, 1 quarter-final
Halmstad	UEFA Women's Euro 2013 (Southern Sweden)	Växjö
Örjans Vall	UEFA Women's Euro 2013 (Southern Sweden)	Myresjöhus Arena
Capacity: 7,500	UEFA Women's Euro 2013 (Southern Sweden)	Capacity: 10,000
3 group matches, 1 quarter-final	UEFA Women's Euro 2013 (Southern Sweden)	3 group matches, 1 quarter-final

== Final draw ==
The final draw for the tournament group stage took place on 9 November 2012 at the Swedish Exhibition & Congress Centre in Gothenburg. The ceremony was conducted by the UEFA General Secretary Gianni Infantino, with the teams drawn out by tournament ambassadors Patrik Andersson and Steffi Jones.

As hosts, Sweden were automatically placed in the top-seeded pot, though they would have been in any case owing to their UEFA coefficient ranking. The eleven qualifiers were placed into the three final draw pots according to their UEFA coefficient ranking. It was decreed in advance the groups into which the three top-seeded teams would be placed.

=== Seedings ===
Top-seeded teams
Team	Coeff	Rank
Sweden ^{H} (A1)	42,503	2
Germany ^{TH} (B1)	43,460	1
France (C1)	40,251	3

Seeded
Team	Coeff	Rank
England	38,903	4
Norway	37,193	5
Italy	37,057	6

Unseeded
Team	Coeff	Rank
Denmark	34,971	7
Iceland	34,524	8
Finland	34,436	9
Russia	33,697	10
Netherlands	33,661	11
Spain	32,999	12

== Match officials ==
Twelve referee trios were announced by the UEFA on 19 June 2013. All officials were based in Jönköping.

Referees
- Kirsi Heikkinen (Finland)
- Bibiana Steinhaus (Germany)
- Katalin Kulcsár (Hungary)
- Silvia Spinelli (Italy)
- Teodora Albon (Romania)
- Cristina Dorcioman (Romania)
- Jenny Palmqvist (Sweden)
- Esther Staubli (Switzerland)
- Kateryna Monzul (Ukraine)
Assistant referees
- Lucie Ratajová (Czech Republic)
- Sian Massey (England)
- Tonja Paavola (Finland)
- Marina Wozniak (Germany)
- Judit Kulcsár (Hungary)
- Romina Santuari (Italy)
- Hege Steinlund (Norway)
- Petruţa Iugulescu (Romania)
- Maria Lisická (Slovakia)
- Maria Villa Gutiérrez (Spain)
- Helen Karo (Sweden)
- Natalia Rachynska (Ukraine)
Fourth officials
- Carina Vitulano (Italy)
- Esther Azzopardi (Malta)
- Monika Mularczyk (Poland)

== Squads ==
The twelve national teams involved in the tournament were required to register a squad of 23 players by 3 June 2013 at the latest. Only players in these squads were eligible to take part in the tournament.

== Results ==
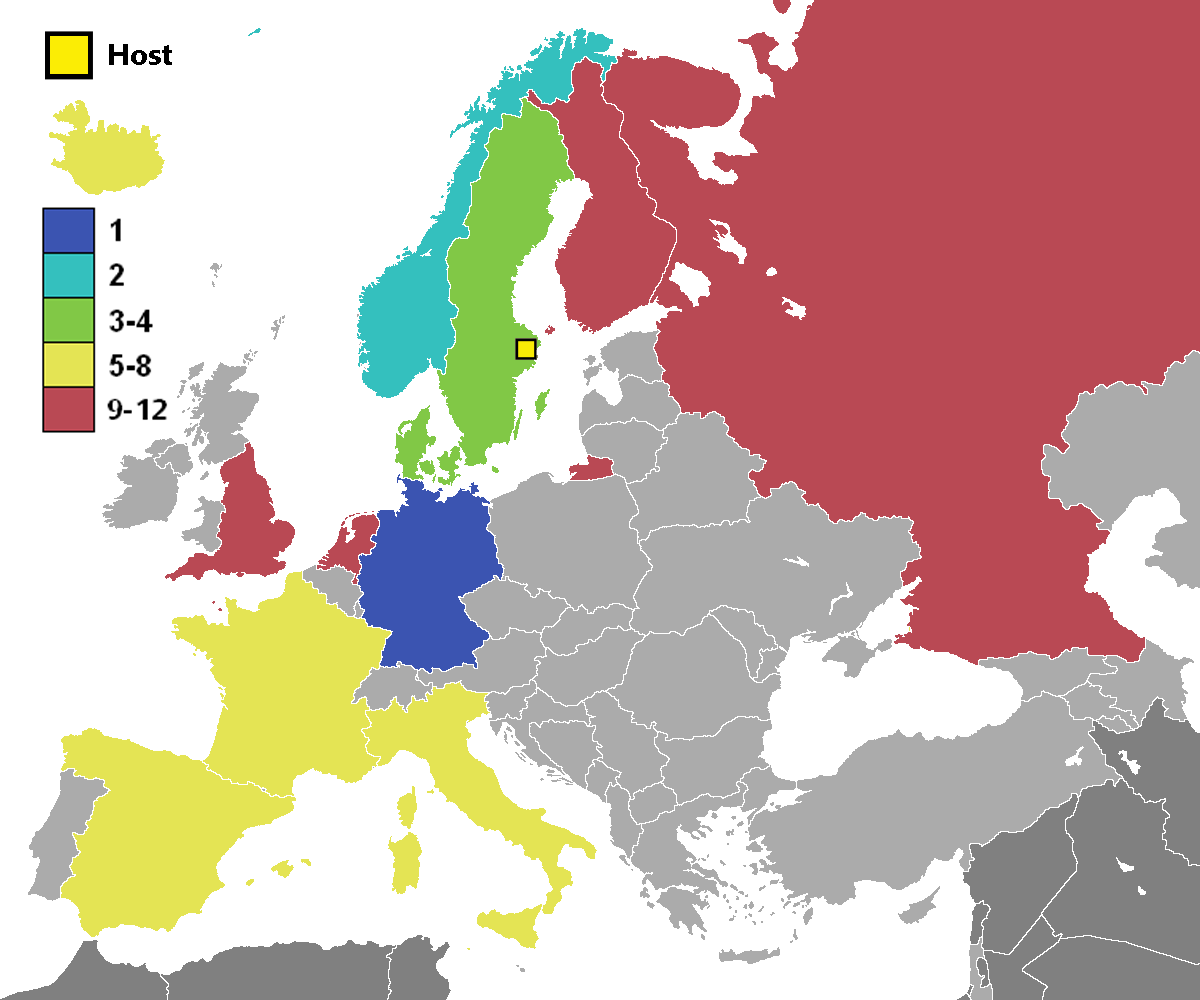
Participating teams and their result

The final match schedule for the tournament was confirmed on 6 December 2012. All twelve finalists began the tournament at the group stage, with those not eliminated then advancing to the knockout stage.

=== Group stage ===
The group winners and runners-up would qualify for the knockout stage, along with the best two third-placed teams; the remaining four teams would be eliminated.

==== Tie-breaking criteria ====
If two or more teams were equal on points on completion of the group matches, the following tie-breaking criteria were applied:

1. Higher number of points obtained in the matches played between the teams in question;
2. Superior goal difference resulting from the matches played between the teams in question;
3. Higher number of goals scored in the matches played between the teams in question; (Note: Criteria 1–3 may be used recursively, meaning applied and reapplied to still fewer teams until they are of no further help)
4. Superior goal difference in all group matches;
5. Higher number of goals scored in all group matches;
6. Position in the UEFA national team coefficient ranking system as at the final draw;

However, the normal tiebreaking rules do not apply if two teams tie (following the application of tiebreakers 1–5) after having met in their final fixture of the group stage, then their ranking will be determined by penalty shoot-out; (Note: This would only be used should a place in the knockout stage be at stake and no other teams are tied.)

==== Group A ====
Pos	Team	Pld	W	D	L	GF	GA	GD	Pts	Qualification
1	Sweden (H)	3	2	1	0	9	2	+7	7	Advance to knockout stage
2	Italy	3	1	1	1	3	4	−1	4	Advance to knockout stage
3	Denmark	3	0	2	1	3	4	−1	2	Advance to knockout stage
4	Finland	3	0	2	1	1	6	−5	2	

Source: UEFA.com
(H) Hosts
10 July 2013
18:00

Italy	0–0	Finland
	Report

Örjans Vall, Halmstad
Attendance: 3,011
Referee: Teodora Albon (Romania)
10 July 2013
20:30

Sweden	1–1	Denmark
Fischer 36'	Report	Knudsen 26'

Gamla Ullevi, Gothenburg
Attendance: 16,128
Referee: Bibiana Steinhaus (Germany)

13 July 2013
18:00

Italy	2–1	Denmark
Gabbiadini 55'; Mauro 60'	Report	Brogaard 66'

Örjans Vall, Halmstad
Attendance: 2,190
Referee: Esther Staubli (Switzerland)
13 July 2013
20:30

Finland	0–5	Sweden
	Report	Fischer 15', 36'; Asllani 38'; Schelin 60', 87'

Gamla Ullevi, Gothenburg
Attendance: 16,414
Referee: Cristina Dorcioman (Romania)

16 July 2013
20:30

Sweden	3–1	Italy
Manieri 47' (o.g.); Schelin 49'; Öqvist 57'	Report	Gabbiadini 78'

Örjans Vall, Halmstad
Attendance: 7,288
Referee: Katalin Kulcsár (Hungary)
16 July 2013
20:30

Denmark	1–1	Finland
Brogaard 29'	Report	Sjölund 87'

Gamla Ullevi, Gothenburg
Attendance: 8,360
Referee: Kateryna Monzul (Ukraine)

==== Group B ====
Pos	Team	Pld	W	D	L	GF	GA	GD	Pts	Qualification
1	Norway	3	2	1	0	3	1	+2	7	Advance to knockout stage
2	Germany	3	1	1	1	3	1	+2	4 (Note: Head-to-head result: Iceland 0–3 Germany.)	Advance to knockout stage
3	Iceland	3	1	1	1	2	4	−2	4	Advance to knockout stage
4	Netherlands	3	0	1	2	0	2	−2	1	

Source: Group B
Notes:
11 July 2013
18:00

Norway	1–1	Iceland
Hegland 26'	Report	M. Viðarsdóttir 87' (pen.)

Guldfågeln Arena, Kalmar
Attendance: 3,867
Referee: Katalin Kulcsár (Hungary)
11 July 2013
20:30

Germany	0–0	Netherlands
	Report

Myresjöhus Arena, Växjö
Attendance: 8,861
Referee: Silvia Spinelli (Italy)

14 July 2013
18:00

Norway	1–0	Netherlands
Gulbrandsen 54'	Report

Guldfågeln Arena, Kalmar
Attendance: 4,256
Referee: Teodora Albon (Romania)
14 July 2013
20:30

Iceland	0–3	Germany
	Report	Lotzen 24'; Okoyino da Mbabi 55', 84'

Myresjöhus Arena, Växjö
Attendance: 4,620
Referee: Kirsi Heikkinen (Finland)

17 July 2013
18:00

Germany	0–1	Norway
	Report	Isaksen 45+1'

Guldfågeln Arena, Kalmar
Attendance: 10,346
Referee: Esther Staubli (Switzerland)
17 July 2013
18:00

Netherlands	0–1	Iceland
	Report	Brynjarsdóttir 30'

Myresjöhus Arena, Växjö
Attendance: 3,406
Referee: Cristina Dorcioman (Romania)

==== Group C ====
Pos	Team	Pld	W	D	L	GF	GA	GD	Pts	Qualification
1	France	3	3	0	0	7	1	+6	9	Advance to knockout stage
2	Spain	3	1	1	1	4	4	0	4	Advance to knockout stage
3	Russia	3	0	2	1	3	5	−2	2	
4	England	3	0	1	2	3	7	−4	1	

Source: UEFA.com
12 July 2013
18:00

France	3–1	Russia
Delie 21', 33'; Le Sommer 67'	Report	Morozova 84'

Nya Parken, Norrköping
Attendance: 2,980
Referee: Jenny Palmqvist (Sweden)
12 July 2013
20:30

England	2–3	Spain
Aluko 8'; Bassett 89'	Report	Boquete 4'; Hermoso 85'; Putellas 90+4'

Arena Linköping, Linköping
Attendance: 5,190
Referee: Kateryna Monzul (Ukraine)

15 July 2013
18:00

England	1–1	Russia
Duggan 90+2'	Report	Korovkina 38'

Arena Linköping, Linköping
Attendance: 3,629
Referee: Bibiana Steinhaus (Germany)
15 July 2013
20:30

Spain	0–1	France
	Report	Renard 5'

Nya Parken, Norrköping
Attendance: 5,068
Referee: Carina Vitulano (Italy)

18 July 2013
20:30

France	3–0	England
Le Sommer 9'; Nécib 62'; Renard 64'	Report

Arena Linköping, Linköping
Attendance: 7,332
Referee: Kirsi Heikkinen (Finland)
18 July 2013
20:30

Russia	1–1	Spain
Terekhova 44'	Report	Boquete 14'

Nya Parken, Norrköping
Attendance: 2,157
Referee: Jenny Palmqvist (Sweden)

==== Ranking of third-placed teams ====
The best two third-placed teams advanced to the knockout stage, with teams being ranked using points as the only criterion. UEFA introduced this principle to avoid teams entering their final matches and "playing on" the previous results, and also to negate the factor of the potentially different strengths of the groups by eliminating goal difference from the calculation. As both Denmark and Russia finished with two points, in accordance with the regulations, UEFA conducted a drawing of lots on 18 July following the completion of the group matches to determine which of these two teams would advance: Denmark was selected and so advanced.

Pos	Grp	Team	Pld	Pts	Qualification
1	B	Iceland	3	4	Advance to knockout stage
2	A	Denmark	3	2 (Note: Denmark was selected in the drawing of lots with Russia.)	Advance to knockout stage
3	C	Russia	3	2	

Source: UEFA.com
Rules for classification: 1) Points; 2) Drawing of lots.

=== Knockout stage ===
The eight advancing teams entered the knockout stage to compete in a single-elimination style tournament. In the knockout stage (including the final), if a match was level at the end of 90 minutes, extra time of two periods (15 minutes each) was played. If the score was still level after extra time, the match was decided by a penalty shootout.

Quarter-finals
21 July – Halmstad
Sweden	4
Iceland	0
21 July – Växjö
Italy	0
Germany	1
22 July – Kalmar
Norway	3
Spain	1
22 July – Linköping
France	1 (2)
Denmark (p)	1 (4)

Semi-finals
24 July – Gothenburg
Sweden	0
Germany	1
25 July – Norrköping
Norway (p)	1 (4)
Denmark	1 (2)

Final
28 July – Solna
Germany	1
Norway	0

All times are local (UTC+2)

==== Quarter-finals ====
21 July 2013
15:00

Sweden	4–0	Iceland
M. Hammarström 3'; Öqvist 14'; Schelin 19', 59'	Report

Örjans Vall, Halmstad
Attendance: 7,468
Referee: Kirsi Heikkinen (Finland)

21 July 2013
18:00

Italy	0–1	Germany
	Report	Laudehr 26'

Myresjöhus Arena, Växjö
Attendance: 9,265
Referee: Katalin Kulcsár (Hungary)

22 July 2013
18:00

Norway	3–1	Spain
Gulbrandsen 24'; Paredes 43' (o.g.); Hegerberg 64'	Report	Hermoso 90+3'

Guldfågeln Arena, Kalmar
Attendance: 10,435
Referee: Bibiana Steinhaus (Germany)

22 July 2013
20:45

France	1–1 (a.e.t.)	Denmark
Nécib 71' (pen.)	Report	Rasmussen 28'
Penalties
Nécib (penalty missed); Thiney (penalty scored); Le Sommer (penalty scored); Delannoy (penalty missed)	2–4	(penalty scored) Røddik; (penalty scored) Rydahl; (penalty scored) Nadim; (penalty missed) Nielsen; (penalty scored) Arnth

Arena Linköping, Linköping
Attendance: 7,448
Referee: Carina Vitulano (Italy)

==== Semi-finals ====
24 July 2013
20:30

Sweden	0–1	Germany
	Report	Marozsán 33'

Gamla Ullevi, Gothenburg
Attendance: 16,608
Referee: Esther Staubli (Switzerland)

25 July 2013
20:30

Norway	1–1 (a.e.t.)	Denmark
Christensen 3'	Report	Knudsen 87'
Penalties
Gulbrandsen (penalty scored); Dekkerhus (penalty scored); Mjelde (penalty scored); Rønning (penalty scored)	4–2	(penalty missed) Røddik; (penalty missed) Nielsen; (penalty scored) Nadim; (penalty scored) Brogaard

Nya Parken, Norrköping
Attendance: 9,260
Referee: Kateryna Monzul (Ukraine)

==== Final ====
28 July 2013
16:00

Germany	1–0	Norway
Mittag 49'	Report

Friends Arena, Solna
Attendance: 41,301
Referee: Cristina Dorcioman (Romania)

== Statistics ==
=== Goalscorers ===
5 goals

- (Sweden) Lotta Schelin

3 goals

- (Sweden) Nilla Fischer

2 goals

- (Denmark) Mia Brogaard
- (Denmark) Mariann Gajhede Knudsen
- (France) Marie-Laure Delie
- (France) Eugénie Le Sommer
- (France) Louisa Nécib
- (France) Wendie Renard
- (Germany) Célia Okoyino da Mbabi
- (Italy) Melania Gabbiadini
- (Norway) Solveig Gulbrandsen
- (Spain) Verónica Boquete
- (Spain) Jennifer Hermoso
- (Sweden) Josefine Öqvist

1 goal

- (Denmark) Johanna Rasmussen
- (England) Eniola Aluko
- (England) Laura Bassett
- (England) Toni Duggan
- (Finland) Annica Sjölund
- (Germany) Simone Laudehr
- (Germany) Lena Lotzen
- (Germany) Dzsenifer Marozsán
- (Germany) Anja Mittag
- (Iceland) Dagný Brynjarsdóttir
- (Iceland) Margrét Lára Viðarsdóttir
- (Italy) Ilaria Mauro
- (Norway) Marit Fiane Christensen
- (Norway) Ada Hegerberg
- (Norway) Kristine Wigdahl Hegland
- (Norway) Ingvild Isaksen
- (Russia) Nelli Korovkina
- (Russia) Elena Morozova
- (Russia) Elena Terekhova
- (Spain) Alexia Putellas
- (Sweden) Kosovare Asllani
- (Sweden) Marie Hammarström

Own goal

- (Italy) Raffaella Manieri (playing against Sweden)
- (Spain) Irene Paredes (playing against Norway)

=== Awards ===
UEFA Squad of the Tournament

Goalkeepers
- (Germany) Nadine Angerer
- (Norway) Ingrid Hjelmseth
- (Denmark) Stina Lykke Petersen
Defenders
- (Germany) Saskia Bartusiak
- (France) Laure Boulleau
- (Norway) Marit Fiane Christensen
- (Sweden) Nilla Fischer
- (Germany) Annike Krahn
- (Norway) Maren Mjelde
- (France) Wendie Renard
Midfielders
- (Germany) Lena Goeßling
- (Norway) Solveig Gulbrandsen
- (Germany) Dzsenifer Marozsán
- (France) Louisa Nécib
- (Denmark) Katrine Søndergaard Pedersen
- (Sweden) Caroline Seger
- (Sweden) Josefine Öqvist
Forwards
- (Spain) Verónica Boquete
- (Italy) Melania Gabbiadini
- (France) Eugénie Le Sommer
- (Germany) Célia Okoyino da Mbabi
- (Sweden) Lotta Schelin
- (France) Gaëtane Thiney

Golden Boot

Golden Boot
(Sweden) Lotta Schelin
5 goals
2 assists Silver Boot
(Sweden) Nilla Fischer
3 goals
0 assists Bronze Boot
(France) Louisa Nécib
2 goals
2 assists

== Miscellany ==
=== Anthem ===
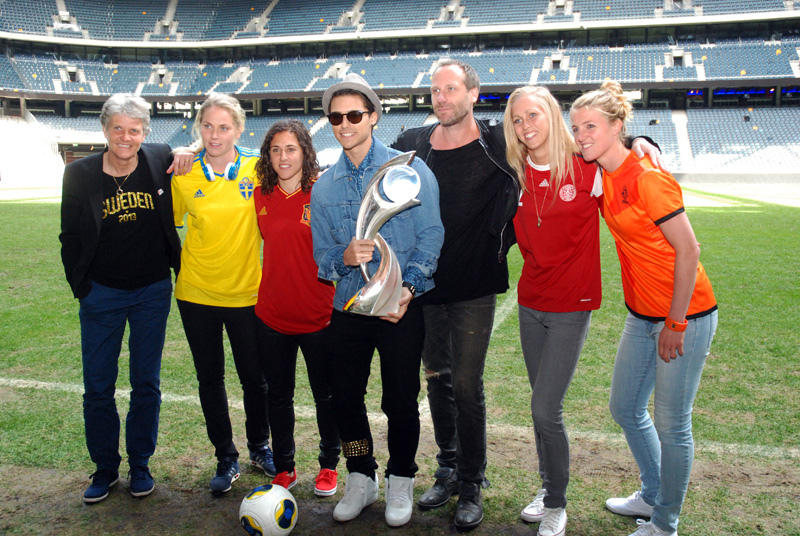
Saade unveiling "Winning Ground"

The official anthem of the tournament was "Winning Ground", composed by Stefan Örn and performed by Swedish pop star Eric Saade. The title of the song was also the slogan of the final tournament. The song was presented on 27 May 2013 at the Friends Arena in an event also featuring Tyresö players Lisa Dahlkvist of Sweden, Denmark's Line Røddik Hansen, Spain's Verónica Boquete and the Netherlands' Kirsten van de Ven.

=== Tickets ===
Tickets for the finals were released on 14 February 2013, available to buy via UEFA's online sales portal or from the Ticnet agency in Sweden. The pricing structure was the same for all venues: SEK 200 (approximately €23.50 (Note: Currency rates are as 14 February 2013 when tickets were released for sale.)) for Category 1 matches, SEK 150 (≈€17.60) for Category 2 and SEK 100 (≈€11.75) for Category 3. Youth tickets, for those aged up to 16, cost SEK 50 (≈€5.85) for all categories. A so-named Follow Your Team Ticket which gave entrance to all three group matches of a selected team was also sold.

The tournament soon surpassed the previous ticket sales record of 129,000 set in 2009, which prompted the organisers to open up the entire 50,000 seats of the Friends Arena for the final, in contrast to the original plan to place only 30,000 tickets on sale. The final set a new attendance record for a Women's Euros fixture (41,301) and helped bring the total number of tickets sold for the tournaments to 216,888. In addition to attending the matches, the tournament became the first Women's Euros event to feature fan zones where fans could gather together to view matches on big screens.
