= Lena Lotzen =

German footballer

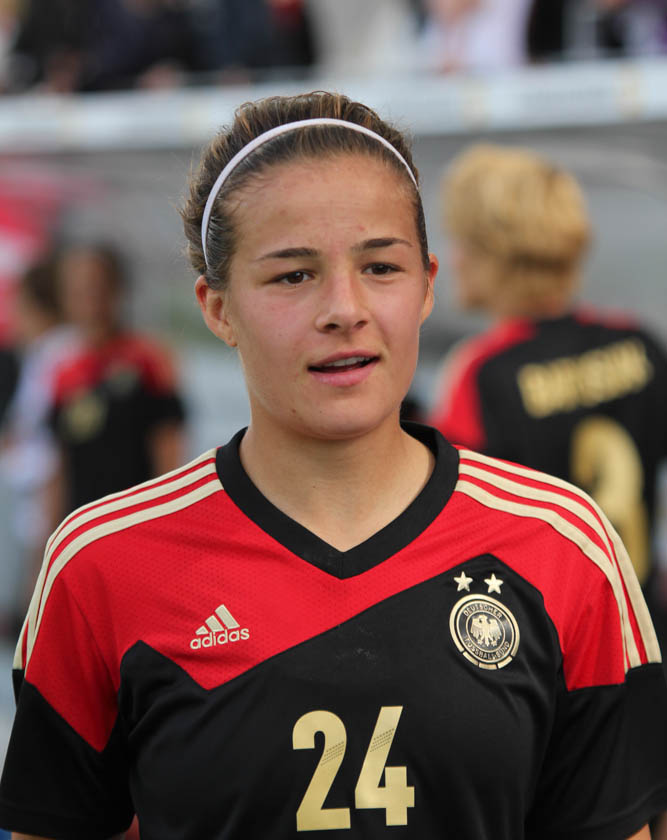
- Lotzen with Germany in 2013

Personal information
- Full name: Lena Lotzen
- Date of birth: 11 September 1993 (age 33)
- Place of birth: Würzburg, Germany
- Height: 1.71 m (5 ft 7 in)
- Position: Forward

Youth career
- TG Höchberg
- JFG Kreis Würzburg Süd-West

Senior career*
Years	Team	Apps	(Gls)
2010–2017	Bayern Munich	72	(24)
2018–2020	SC Freiburg	26	(2)
2020–2021	1. FC Köln	0	(0)

International career
2008	Germany U15	5	(1)
2009	Germany U16	5	(5)
2010	Germany U17	11	(4)
2008	Germany U19	9	(5)
2011	Germany U20	12	(9)
2012–2021	Germany	25	(4)
Medal record
Women's football
Representing Germany
UEFA Women's Championship
Gold medal – first place	2013 Sweden	Team
- * Club domestic league appearances and goals

Lena Lotzen (born 11 September 1993) is a German former professional footballer who played as a forward.

== Club career ==
On 18 April 2016, Lotzen extended her contract with FC Bayern Munich until 2018.

== International career ==
With five goals Lotzen was the top scorer of the Germany Under-19 national team that won the 2011 U-19 European Championship. She made her debut for the senior national team on 29 February 2012 against Iceland in the 2012 Algarve Cup. Her first goal for the senior team was against Iceland on 14 July 2013 in a UEFA Women's Euro 2013 match, where she won the title.

== Career statistics ==
Scores and results list Germany's goal tally first:

Lotzen – goals for Germany
#	Date	Location	Opponent	Score	Result	Competition
1.	14 July 2013	Växjö, Sweden	Iceland	1–0	3–0	UEFA Women's Euro 2013
2.	5 April 2014	Dublin, Ireland	Republic of Ireland	2–1	3–2	2015 FIFA Women's World Cup qualification
3.	10 April 2014	Mannheim, Germany	Slovenia	3–0	4–0	2015 FIFA Women's World Cup qualification
4.	19 June 2014	Vancouver, Canada	Canada	1–0	2–1	Friendly

== Honors ==
Bayern München

- Bundesliga: 2014–15, 2015–16
- DFB-Pokal: 2011–12
- Bundesliga Cup: 2011

Germany

- UEFA Women's Championship: 2013
- Algarve Cup: 2012

Germany U19

- UEFA Women's Under-19 Championship: 2011

Individual

- FIFA U-20 Women's World Cup Bronze Shoe: 2012
- Fritz Walter Medal Gold: 2012
