= Even Pellerud =

Norwegian footballer and coach (born 1953)

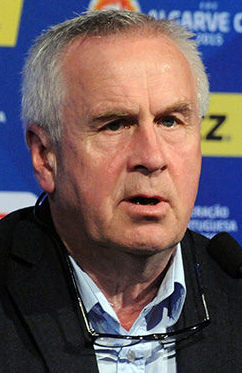

Personal information
- Full name: Even Jostein Pellerud
- Date of birth: 15 July 1953 (age 73)
- Place of birth: Brandval, Norway
- Position: Midfielder

Senior career*
Years	Team	Apps	(Gls)
1974–1979	Vålerenga	93	(10)
1983–1986	Kongsvinger	87	(8)
Total		180	(18)

Managerial career
- 1987–1989: Kongsvinger
- 1989–1996: Norway (women)
- 1997: Lillestrøm
- 1998: Ikast
- 1999–2008: Canada (women)
- 2008–2012: Trinidad & Tobago (women)
- 2012–2015: Norway (women)
- * Club domestic league appearances and goals

Even Jostein Pellerud (born 15 July 1953) is a Norwegian football coach and former player. Pellerud is the only manager in men's or women's football to reach a major tournament final on five occasions, bringing the Norway Women to three UEFA Women's European Championship finals (UEFA Women's Euro 1991, UEFA Women's Euro 1993, UEFA Women's Euro 2013) and two FIFA Women's World Cup finals (1991 FIFA Women's World Cup, 1995 FIFA Women's World Cup).

== Career ==
Pellerud played for several clubs, including Vålerenga from 1974 to 1979 and Kongsvinger from 1983 to 1986. He was head coach for the Norway women's national football team from 1989 to 1996, and led the Norway team to silver medal at the inaugural first 1991 Women's World Cup, to world champions at the second in 1995, and to bronze medalists at the 1996 Summer Olympics. In 1997, he was sacked as coach of Lillestrøm, together with Per Brogeland. He had a brief tenure as manager of Danish Superliga club Ikast fS.

He was head coach for the Canada women's national soccer team from 1999 to 2008. In 2003, he led team Canada to fourth place in the 2003 Women's World Cup. He led team Canada to the 2008 Summer Olympics, where they finished in an impressive 5th place. He announced his retirement at the end of his contract with Canada in December 2008. He has subsequently come out of retirement and on 16 January 2009 it was announced that he was hired to be the coach of the Trinidad and Tobago women's national football team as well as the country's women's under-20 and girls' under-17 teams.

He was educated at Norwegian School of Sport Sciences.

On 6 December 2012, the Norwegian football association (NFF) announced that Pellerud had signed a four-year contract as the chief trainer of the Norway women's national team. On 12 August 2015, he resigned as the chief trainer of the Norway women's national team.

== Family Life ==
Even has a wife and two twin daughters with her, Tora and Hedvig. He spends the majority of his time between various work obligations taking him through Europe (mainly Norway) and North America (Canada).
