= 2014 Algarve Cup squads =

Lists of the squads for the 2014 Algarve Cup

This article lists the squads for the 2014 Algarve Cup, the 21st edition of the Algarve Cup. The cup consisted of a series of friendly games, and was held in the Algarve region of Portugal from 5 to 12 March 2014. The twelve national teams involved in the tournament registered a squad of 23 players.

The age listed for each player is as of 5 March 2015, the first day of the tournament. The numbers of caps and goals listed for each player do not include any matches played after the start of tournament. The club listed is the club for which the player last played a competitive match prior to the tournament. The nationality for each club reflects the national association (not the league) to which the club is affiliated. A flag is included for coaches that are of a different nationality than their own national team.

== Group A ==
=== China ===
Head coach: Hao Wei

| No. | Pos. | Player | Date of birth (age) | Caps | Goals | Club |
|---|---|---|---|---|---|---|
| 1 | GK | Zhang Yue | 30 September 1990 (aged 23) | | | (Chinese Football Association) Beijing Baxy |
| 3 | DF | Wang Lingling | 18 June 1988 (aged 25) | | | (Chinese Football Association) Beijing Baxy |
| 4 | DF | Li Jiayue | 8 June 1990 (aged 23) | | | (Chinese Football Association) Shanghai STV |
| 5 | DF | Wu Haiyan (captain) | 26 February 1993 (aged 21) | | | (Chinese Football Association) Zhejiang Hangzhou Xizi |
| 7 | MF | Xu Yanlu | 16 September 1991 (aged 22) | | | (Chinese Football Association) Jiangsu Huatai |
| 9 | FW | Lou Jiahui | 26 May 1991 (aged 22) | | | (Chinese Football Association) Henan Steel |
| 10 | FW | Li Ying | 7 January 1993 (aged 21) | | | (Chinese Football Association) Zhejiang Hangzhou Xizi |
| 11 | MF | Huang Yini | 7 January 1993 (aged 21) | | | (Chinese Football Association) Shanghai STV |
| 12 | GK | Wang Fei | 22 March 1990 (aged 23) | | | (Chinese Football Association) Dalian Shide |
| 13 | FW | Gao Qi | 21 August 1991 (aged 22) | | | (Chinese Football Association) Guangdong Haiyin |
| 14 | FW | Wang Shanshan | 27 January 1990 (aged 24) | | | (Chinese Football Association) Tianjin Huisen |
| 15 | MF | Lei Jiahui | 22 September 1995 (aged 18) | | | (Chinese Football Association) Henan Steel |
| 16 | MF | Wang Chen | 24 October 1989 (aged 24) | | | (Chinese Football Association) Beijing Baxy |
| 17 | MF | Li Xianglin | 14 September 1989 (aged 24) | | | (Chinese Football Association) Tianjin Huisen |
| 18 | MF | Han Peng | 20 December 1989 (aged 24) | | | (Chinese Football Association) Tianjin Huisen |
| 19 | MF | Zhou Feifei | 24 September 1987 (aged 26) | | | (Chinese Football Association) Jiangsu Huatai |
| 21 | MF | Wang Lisi | 28 November 1991 (aged 22) | | | (Chinese Football Association) Jiangsu Huatai |
| 23 | MF | Ren Guixin | 19 December 1988 (aged 25) | | | (Chinese Football Association) Changchun Zhuoyue |
| 25 | FW | Zhang Rui | 27 January 1989 (aged 25) | | | (Chinese Football Association) People's Liberation Army |
| 26 | DF | Li Dongna | 6 December 1988 (aged 25) | | | (Chinese Football Association) Tianjin Huisen |
| 28 | MF | Zhang Xin | 23 May 1992 (aged 21) | | | (Chinese Football Association) Shanghai STV |
| 29 | FW | Yang Li | 31 January 1991 (aged 23) | | | (Chinese Football Association) Jiangsu Huatai |
| 30 | DF | Liu Shanshan | 16 March 1992 (aged 21) | | | (Chinese Football Association) Hebei Sports |

=== Germany ===
The squad was announced on 24 February 2014. On 2 March 2014, Linda Bresonik withdrew due to injury and was replaced by Tabea Kemme.

Head coach: Silvia Neid

| No. | Pos. | Player | Date of birth (age) | Caps | Goals | Club |
|---|---|---|---|---|---|---|
| 1 | GK | Nadine Angerer (captain) | 10 November 1978 (aged 35) | 127 | 0 | (Football Australia) Brisbane Roar |
| 2 | DF | Bianca Schmidt | 23 January 1990 (aged 24) | 39 | 3 | (German Football Association) 1. FFC Frankfurt |
| 3 | DF | Babett Peter | 12 May 1988 (aged 25) | 79 | 4 | (German Football Association) 1. FFC Frankfurt |
| 4 | DF | Leonie Maier | 29 September 1992 (aged 21) | 20 | 3 | (German Football Association) Bayern Munich |
| 5 | DF | Annike Krahn | 1 July 1985 (aged 28) | 99 | 5 | (French Football Federation) Paris Saint-Germain |
| 6 | MF | Simone Laudehr | 12 July 1986 (aged 27) | 69 | 16 | (German Football Association) 1. FFC Frankfurt |
| 7 | MF | Melanie Behringer | 18 November 1985 (aged 28) | 92 | 24 | (German Football Association) 1. FFC Frankfurt |
| 8 | MF | Nadine Keßler | 4 April 1988 (aged 25) | 21 | 8 | (German Football Association) VfL Wolfsburg |
| 10 | FW | Dzsenifer Marozsán | 18 April 1992 (aged 21) | 29 | 14 | (German Football Association) 1. FFC Frankfurt |
| 11 | MF | Anja Mittag | 16 May 1985 (aged 28) | 101 | 23 | (Swedish Football Association) Rosengård |
| 12 | GK | Almuth Schult | 4 June 1987 (aged 26) | 13 | 0 | (German Football Association) VfL Wolfsburg |
| 13 | FW | Célia Šašić | 27 June 1988 (aged 25) | 89 | 49 | (German Football Association) 1. FFC Frankfurt |
| 14 | DF | Tabea Kemme | 14 December 1991 (age 34) | 1 | 0 | (German Football Association) Turbine Potsdam |
| 15 | DF | Jennifer Cramer | 24 February 1993 (aged 21) | 10 | 0 | (German Football Association) Turbine Potsdam |
| 16 | MF | Melanie Leupolz | 14 April 1994 (aged 19) | 10 | 1 | (German Football Association) SC Freiburg |
| 17 | DF | Josephine Henning | 8 September 1989 (aged 24) | 14 | 0 | (German Football Association) VfL Wolfsburg |
| 18 | FW | Alexandra Popp | 6 April 1991 (aged 22) | 39 | 22 | (German Football Association) VfL Wolfsburg |
| 19 | MF | Fatmire Bajramaj | 1 April 1988 (aged 25) | 67 | 15 | (German Football Association) 1. FFC Frankfurt |
| 20 | MF | Lena Goeßling | 8 March 1986 (aged 27) | 58 | 7 | (German Football Association) VfL Wolfsburg |
| 21 | GK | Laura Benkarth | 14 October 1992 (aged 21) | 0 | 0 | (German Football Association) SC Freiburg |
| 22 | DF | Luisa Wensing | 8 February 1993 (aged 21) | 15 | 1 | (German Football Association) VfL Wolfsburg |
| 23 | FW | Sara Däbritz | 15 February 1995 (aged 19) | 7 | 0 | (German Football Association) SC Freiburg |
| 24 | MF | Kathrin Hendrich | 6 April 1992 (aged 21) | 0 | 0 | (German Football Association) Bayer Leverkusen |

=== Iceland ===
The squad was announced on 24 February 2014.

Head coach: Freyr Alexandersson

| No. | Pos. | Player | Date of birth (age) | Caps | Goals | Club |
|---|---|---|---|---|---|---|
| 1 | GK | Þóra Björg Helgadóttir | 5 May 1981 (aged 32) | 99 | 0 | (Swedish Football Association) Rosengård |
| 2 | DF | Soffía Arnþrúður Gunnarsdóttir | 22 October 1987 (aged 26) | 0 | 0 | (Swedish Football Association) Jitex |
| 3 | DF | Ólína Guðbjörg Viðarsdóttir | 16 November 1982 (aged 31) | 64 | 2 | (Football Association of Iceland) Valur |
| 4 | DF | Glódís Perla Viggósdóttir | 27 June 1995 (aged 18) | 14 | 0 | (Football Association of Iceland) Stjarnan |
| 5 | MF | Katrín Ásbjörnsdóttir | 11 December 1992 (aged 21) | 1 | 0 | (Football Association of Iceland) Þór/KA |
| 6 | FW | Elín Metta Jensen | 1 March 1995 (aged 19) | 5 | 0 | (Football Association of Iceland) Valur |
| 7 | MF | Sara Björk Gunnarsdóttir (captain) | 29 September 1990 (aged 23) | 66 | 14 | (Swedish Football Association) Rosengård |
| 8 | MF | Katrín Ómarsdóttir | 27 June 1987 (aged 26) | 57 | 10 | (The Football Association) Liverpool |
| 9 | FW | Fanndís Friðriksdóttir | 9 May 1990 (aged 23) | 43 | 2 | (Norwegian Football Federation) Arna-Bjørnar |
| 10 | MF | Dóra María Lárusdóttir | 24 July 1985 (aged 28) | 96 | 15 | (Football Association of Iceland) Valur |
| 11 | MF | Hallbera Guðný Gísladóttir | 14 September 1986 (aged 27) | 46 | 1 | (Italian Football Federation) Torres |
| 12 | GK | Sandra Sigurðardóttir | 2 October 1986 (aged 27) | 6 | 0 | (Football Association of Iceland) Stjarnan |
| 13 | GK | Guðbjörg Gunnarsdóttir | 18 May 1985 (aged 28) | 28 | 0 | (German Football Association) Turbine Potsdam |
| 14 | MF | Dagný Brynjarsdóttir | 10 August 1991 (aged 22) | 36 | 4 | (Football Association of Iceland) Selfoss |
| 15 | DF | Anna Björk Kristjánsdóttir | 14 October 1989 (aged 24) | 1 | 0 | (Football Association of Iceland) Stjarnan |
| 16 | FW | Harpa Þorsteinsdóttir | 27 June 1986 (aged 27) | 34 | 1 | (Football Association of Iceland) Stjarnan |
| 17 | MF | Ásgerður Baldursdóttir | 5 October 1987 (aged 26) | 0 | 0 | (Football Association of Iceland) Stjarnan |
| 18 | DF | Anna María Baldursdóttir | 28 August 1994 (aged 19) | 3 | 0 | (Football Association of Iceland) Stjarnan |
| 19 | MF | Þórunn Helga Jónsdóttir | 17 December 1984 (aged 29) | 9 | 0 | (Norwegian Football Federation) Avaldsnes |
| 20 | DF | Elísa Viðarsdóttir | 26 May 1991 (aged 22) | 8 | 0 | (Swedish Football Association) Kristianstad |
| 21 | DF | Mist Edvardsdóttir | 17 October 1990 (aged 23) | 10 | 0 | (Football Association of Iceland) Valur |
| 22 | MF | Rakel Hönnudóttir | 30 December 1988 (aged 25) | 55 | 3 | (Football Association of Iceland) Breiðablik |
| 23 | FW | Guðmunda Brynja Óladóttir | 3 January 1994 (aged 20) | 1 | 0 | (Football Association of Iceland) Selfoss |

=== Norway ===
The squad was announced on 19 February 2014.

Head coach: Even Pellerud

| No. | Pos. | Player | Date of birth (age) | Caps | Goals | Club |
|---|---|---|---|---|---|---|
| 1 | GK | Ingrid Hjelmseth | 10 April 1980 (aged 33) | 78 | 0 | (Norwegian Football Federation) Stabæk |
| 2 | DF | Marita Skammelsrud Lund | 29 January 1989 (aged 25) | 47 | 2 | (Norwegian Football Federation) LSK Kvinner |
| 3 | DF | Ingrid Ryland | 29 May 1989 (aged 24) | 19 | 0 | (Norwegian Football Federation) Arna-Bjørnar |
| 4 | MF | Ingvild Stensland (captain) | 3 August 1981 (aged 32) | 132 | 9 | (Norwegian Football Federation) Stabæk |
| 5 | MF | Andrine Tomter | 5 February 1995 (aged 19) | 3 | 0 | (Norwegian Football Federation) Kolbotn |
| 6 | DF | Maren Mjelde | 6 November 1989 (aged 24) | 67 | 6 | (German Football Association) Turbine Potsdam |
| 7 | DF | Trine Rønning | 14 June 1982 (aged 31) | 140 | 20 | (Norwegian Football Federation) Stabæk |
| 8 | DF | Ingrid Schjelderup | 21 December 1987 (aged 26) | 5 | 0 | (Norwegian Football Federation) Vålerenga |
| 9 | FW | Isabell Herlovsen | 23 June 1988 (aged 25) | 85 | 31 | (Norwegian Football Federation) LSK Kvinner |
| 10 | FW | Ada Hegerberg | 10 July 1995 (aged 18) | 18 | 6 | (German Football Association) Turbine Potsdam |
| 11 | DF | Nora Holstad Berge | 26 March 1987 (aged 26) | 33 | 0 | (German Football Association) Bayern Munich |
| 12 | GK | Silje Vesterbekkmo | 22 June 1983 (aged 30) | 3 | 0 | (Norwegian Football Federation) Røa |
| 13 | FW | Melissa Bjånesøy | 18 April 1992 (aged 21) | 11 | 2 | (Norwegian Football Federation) Sandviken |
| 14 | MF | Cathrine Dekkerhus | 17 September 1992 (aged 21) | 15 | 0 | (Norwegian Football Federation) Stabæk |
| 15 | MF | Guro Reiten | 26 July 1994 (aged 19) | 3 | 0 | (Norwegian Football Federation) Trondheims-Ørn |
| 16 | FW | Elise Thorsnes | 14 August 1988 (aged 25) | 72 | 13 | (Norwegian Football Federation) Stabæk |
| 17 | MF | Lene Mykjåland | 20 February 1987 (aged 27) | 58 | 9 | (Norwegian Football Federation) LSK Kvinner |
| 18 | DF | Kristine Minde | 6 August 1992 (aged 21) | 30 | 5 | (Norwegian Football Federation) Arna-Bjørnar |
| 19 | MF | Ingvild Isaksen | 10 February 1989 (aged 25) | 39 | 1 | (Norwegian Football Federation) Kolbotn |
| 20 | MF | Emilie Haavi | 16 June 1992 (aged 21) | 24 | 5 | (Norwegian Football Federation) LSK Kvinner |
| 21 | FW | Ida Elise Enget | 14 June 1989 (aged 24) | 3 | 0 | (Norwegian Football Federation) Stabæk |
| 22 | MF | Andrine Hegerberg | 6 June 1993 (aged 20) | 2 | 0 | (Swedish Football Association) Kopparbergs/Göteborg |
| 23 | GK | Nora Neset Gjøen | 20 February 1992 (aged 22) | 3 | 0 | (Norwegian Football Federation) Kolbotn |

== Group B ==
=== Denmark ===
The squad was announced on 14 February 2014.

Head coach: Nils Nielsen

| No. | Pos. | Player | Date of birth (age) | Caps | Goals | Club |
|---|---|---|---|---|---|---|
| 1 | GK | Stina Lykke Petersen | 9 February 1986 (aged 28) | 28 | 0 | (German Football Association) FCR 2001 Duisburg |
| 2 | MF | Simone Boye Sørensen | 3 March 1992 (aged 22) | 3 | 0 | (Danish Football Association) Brøndby |
| 3 | MF | Line Sigvardsen Jensen | 23 August 1991 (aged 22) | 26 | 1 | (Danish Football Association) Fortuna Hjørring |
| 4 | MF | Sofie Junge Pedersen | 24 April 1992 (aged 21) | 20 | 2 | (Danish Football Association) Fortuna Hjørring |
| 5 | MF | Tenna Kappel | 20 March 1992 (aged 21) | 0 | 0 | (Danish Football Association) Vildbjerg |
| 6 | MF | Mariann Gajhede Knudsen (captain) | 16 November 1984 (aged 29) | 95 | 4 | (Swedish Football Association) Linköping |
| 7 | FW | Sanne Troelsgaard | 15 August 1988 (aged 25) | 64 | 16 | (Danish Football Association) Brøndby |
| 8 | DF | Theresa Nielsen | 20 July 1986 (aged 27) | 66 | 3 | (Danish Football Association) Brøndby |
| 9 | MF | Nanna Christiansen | 17 June 1989 (aged 24) | 51 | 5 | (Danish Football Association) B93/HIK/Skjold |
| 10 | FW | Nadia Nadim | 2 January 1988 (aged 26) | 44 | 7 | (Danish Football Association) Fortuna Hjørring |
| 11 | MF | Katrine Veje | 19 June 1991 (aged 22) | 54 | 5 | (Danish Football Association) Brøndby |
| 12 | FW | Louise Winter | 24 September 1987 (aged 26) | 2 | 0 | (Danish Football Association) Brøndby |
| 13 | MF | Johanna Rasmussen | 2 July 1983 (aged 30) | 113 | 30 | (Swedish Football Association) Kristianstad |
| 14 | MF | Karoline Smidt Nielsen | 12 May 1994 (aged 19) | 8 | 2 | (Danish Football Association) Fortuna Hjørring |
| 15 | FW | Frederikke Thøgersen | 24 July 1995 (aged 18) | 0 | 0 | (Danish Football Association) Fortuna Hjørring |
| 16 | GK | Cecilie Sørensen | 25 March 1987 (aged 26) | 3 | 0 | (Danish Football Association) B93/HIK/Skjold |
| 17 | FW | Camilla Kur Larsen | 3 April 1989 (aged 24) | 1 | 0 | (Danish Football Association) Fortuna Hjørring |
| 18 | DF | Simone Hagelskjær | 2 March 1992 (aged 22) | 0 | 0 | (Danish Football Association) Skovbakken |
| 19 | MF | Julie Trustrup Jensen | 6 April 1994 (aged 19) | 2 | 0 | (Danish Football Association) Brøndby |
| 20 | MF | Julie Tavlo Petersson | 20 October 1989 (aged 24) | 3 | 0 | (Danish Football Association) Taastrup FC |
| 21 | FW | Lotte Troelsgaard | 15 August 1988 (aged 25) | 1 | 0 | (Danish Football Association) KoldingQ |
| 22 | DF | Line Røddik Hansen | 31 January 1988 (aged 26) | 91 | 10 | (Swedish Football Association) Tyresö |

=== Japan ===
The squad was announced on 17 February 2014.

Head coach: Norio Sasaki

| No. | Pos. | Player | Date of birth (age) | Caps | Goals | Club |
|---|---|---|---|---|---|---|
| 1 | GK | Miho Fukumoto | 2 October 1983 (aged 30) | 70 | 0 | (Japan Football Association) Okayama Yunogo Belle |
| 2 | DF | Yukari Kinga | 2 May 1984 (aged 29) | 88 | 5 | (The Football Association) Arsenal |
| 3 | DF | Azusa Iwashimizu | 14 October 1986 (aged 27) | 95 | 8 | (Japan Football Association) NTV Beleza |
| 4 | DF | Saki Kumagai | 17 October 1990 (aged 23) | 58 | 0 | (French Football Federation) Lyon |
| 5 | DF | Megumi Kamionobe | 15 March 1986 (aged 27) | 23 | 2 | (Japan Football Association) Albirex Niigata |
| 6 | MF | Mizuho Sakaguchi | 15 October 1987 (aged 26) | 68 | 18 | (Japan Football Association) NTV Beleza |
| 7 | MF | Kozue Ando | 9 July 1982 (aged 31) | 115 | 18 | (German Football Association) 1. FFC Frankfurt |
| 8 | MF | Aya Miyama (captain) | 28 January 1985 (aged 29) | 127 | 30 | (Japan Football Association) Okayama Yunogo Belle |
| 9 | MF | Nahomi Kawasumi | 23 September 1985 (aged 28) | 50 | 12 | (United States Soccer Federation) Seattle Reign |
| 10 | MF | Homare Sawa | 6 September 1978 (aged 35) | 189 | 81 | (Japan Football Association) INAC Kobe Leonessa |
| 11 | FW | Shinobu Ohno | 23 January 1984 (aged 30) | 119 | 39 | (The Football Association) Arsenal |
| 12 | DF | Shiori Miyake | 13 October 1995 (aged 18) | 1 | 0 | (Japan Football Association) INAC Kobe Leonessa |
| 13 | MF | Rumi Utsugi | 5 December 1988 (aged 25) | 62 | 5 | (French Football Federation) Montpellier |
| 14 | MF | Asuna Tanaka | 23 April 1988 (aged 25) | 28 | 3 | (German Football Association) 1. FFC Frankfurt |
| 15 | FW | Megumi Takase | 10 November 1990 (aged 23) | 35 | 5 | (Japan Football Association) INAC Kobe Leonessa |
| 16 | FW | Mana Iwabuchi | 18 March 1993 (aged 20) | 20 | 2 | (German Football Association) TSG 1899 Hoffenheim |
| 17 | FW | Yūki Ōgimi | 15 July 1987 (aged 26) | 103 | 47 | (The Football Association) Chelsea |
| 18 | GK | Ayumi Kaihori | 4 September 1986 (aged 27) | 40 | 0 | (Japan Football Association) INAC Kobe Leonessa |
| 20 | DF | Kana Kitahara | 17 December 1988 (aged 25) | 1 | 0 | (Japan Football Association) Albirex Niigata |
| 21 | GK | Erina Yamane | 20 December 1990 (aged 23) | 4 | 0 | (Japan Football Association) JEF United |
| 22 | MF | Nanase Kiryu | 31 October 1989 (aged 24) | 6 | 0 | (United States Soccer Federation) Sky Blue |
| 23 | MF | Emi Nakajima | 27 September 1990 (aged 23) | 9 | 1 | (Japan Football Association) INAC Kobe Leonessa |

=== Sweden ===
The squad was announced on 12 February 2014.

Head coach: Pia Sundhage

| No. | Pos. | Player | Date of birth (age) | Caps | Goals | Club |
|---|---|---|---|---|---|---|
| 1 | GK | Hedvig Lindahl | 29 April 1983 (aged 30) | 93 | 0 | (Swedish Football Association) Kristianstad |
| 2 | DF | Charlotte Rohlin | 20 December 1980 (aged 33) | 68 | 6 | (Swedish Football Association) Linköping |
| 3 | DF | Linda Sembrant | 15 May 1987 (aged 26) | 40 | 1 | (Swedish Football Association) Tyresö |
| 4 | DF | Amanda Ilestedt | 17 January 1993 (aged 21) | 3 | 1 | (Swedish Football Association) Rosengård |
| 5 | DF | Nilla Fischer | 20 August 1984 (aged 29) | 111 | 18 | (German Football Association) VfL Wolfsburg |
| 6 | DF | Sara Thunebro | 26 April 1979 (aged 34) | 115 | 5 | (Swedish Football Association) Eskilstuna United |
| 7 | MF | Lisa Dahlkvist | 6 February 1987 (aged 27) | 77 | 9 | (Swedish Football Association) Tyresö |
| 8 | FW | Lotta Schelin (captain) | 27 February 1984 (aged 30) | 129 | 63 | (French Football Federation) Lyon |
| 9 | FW | Kosovare Asllani | 29 July 1989 (aged 24) | 58 | 13 | (French Football Federation) Paris Saint-Germain |
| 10 | FW | Sofia Jakobsson | 23 April 1990 (aged 23) | 37 | 5 | (German Football Association) BV Cloppenburg |
| 11 | FW | Antonia Göransson | 16 September 1990 (aged 23) | 43 | 7 | (German Football Association) Turbine Potsdam |
| 12 | GK | Carola Söberg | 29 July 1982 (aged 31) | 1 | 0 | (Swedish Football Association) Tyresö |
| 13 | MF | Emmelie Konradsson | 9 April 1989 (aged 24) | 10 | 0 | (Swedish Football Association) Umeå |
| 14 | FW | Hanna Folkesson | 15 June 1988 (aged 25) | 5 | 0 | (Swedish Football Association) Umeå |
| 15 | MF | Therese Sjögran | 8 April 1977 (aged 36) | 187 | 19 | (Swedish Football Association) Rosengård |
| 16 | DF | Lina Nilsson | 17 June 1987 (aged 26) | 47 | 0 | (Swedish Football Association) Rosengård |
| 17 | MF | Caroline Seger | 19 March 1985 (aged 28) | 116 | 15 | (Swedish Football Association) Tyresö |
| 18 | DF | Jessica Samuelsson | 30 January 1992 (aged 22) | 13 | 0 | (Football Australia) Melbourne Victory |
| 19 | DF | Emma Lundh | 26 June 1989 (aged 24) | 1 | 0 | (Swedish Football Association) AIK |
| 20 | MF | Emilia Appelqvist | 21 February 1990 (aged 24) | 1 | 0 | (Swedish Football Association) Piteå |
| 21 | GK | Stephanie Öhrström | 12 January 1987 (aged 27) | 0 | 0 | (Italian Football Federation) Verona |
| 22 | MF | Olivia Schough | 11 March 1991 (aged 22) | 9 | 0 | (German Football Association) Bayern Munich |
| 23 | FW | Elin Rubensson | 11 May 1993 (aged 20) | 3 | 0 | (Swedish Football Association) Rosengård |

=== United States ===
The squad was announced on 24 February 2014.

Head Coach: (Scotland) Tom Sermanni

| No. | Pos. | Player | Date of birth (age) | Caps | Goals | Club |
|---|---|---|---|---|---|---|
| 1 | GK | Hope Solo | 30 July 1981 (aged 32) | 145 | 0 | (United States Soccer Federation) Seattle Reign |
| 2 | FW | Sydney Leroux | 7 May 1990 (aged 23) | 46 | 26 | (United States Soccer Federation) Seattle Reign |
| 3 | DF | Christie Rampone (captain) | 24 June 1975 (aged 38) | 289 | 4 | (United States Soccer Federation) Sky Blue |
| 4 | DF | Becky Sauerbrunn | 6 June 1985 (aged 28) | 52 | 0 | (United States Soccer Federation) Kansas City |
| 5 | DF | Kelley O'Hara | 4 August 1988 (aged 25) | 41 | 0 | (United States Soccer Federation) Sky Blue |
| 6 | DF | Whitney Engen | 28 November 1987 (aged 26) | 12 | 1 | (Swedish Football Association) Tyresö |
| 7 | MF | Morgan Brian | 26 February 1993 (aged 21) | 5 | 2 | (United States Soccer Federation) Virginia Cavaliers |
| 8 | FW | Amy Rodriguez | 17 February 1987 (aged 27) | 105 | 27 | (United States Soccer Federation) Kansas City |
| 9 | MF | Heather O'Reilly | 2 January 1985 (aged 29) | 196 | 39 | (United States Soccer Federation) Boston Breakers |
| 10 | MF | Carli Lloyd | 16 July 1982 (aged 31) | 164 | 48 | (United States Soccer Federation) Western New York Flash |
| 11 | DF | Ali Krieger | 28 July 1984 (aged 29) | 40 | 1 | (United States Soccer Federation) Washington Spirit |
| 12 | MF | Sam Mewis | 9 October 1992 (aged 21) | 0 | 0 | (United States Soccer Federation) UCLA Bruins |
| 13 | FW | Sarah Hagen | 18 November 1989 (aged 24) | 0 | 0 | (German Football Association) Bayern Munich |
| 14 | DF | Stephanie Cox | 3 April 1986 (aged 27) | 85 | 0 | (United States Soccer Federation) Seattle Reign |
| 15 | MF | Megan Rapinoe | 5 July 1985 (aged 28) | 78 | 23 | (United States Soccer Federation) Seattle Reign |
| 16 | DF | Rachel Van Hollebeke | 26 August 1985 (aged 28) | 110 | 5 | (United States Soccer Federation) Portland Thorns |
| 17 | MF | Tobin Heath | 29 May 1988 (aged 25) | 69 | 8 | (French Football Federation) Paris Saint-Germain |
| 18 | GK | Alyssa Naeher | 20 April 1988 (aged 25) | 0 | 0 | (United States Soccer Federation) Boston Breakers |
| 19 | DF | Kristie Mewis | 25 February 1991 (aged 23) | 12 | 1 | (United States Soccer Federation) Boston Breakers |
| 20 | FW | Abby Wambach | 2 June 1980 (aged 33) | 215 | 165 | (United States Soccer Federation) Western New York Flash |
| 21 | GK | Jillian Loyden | 25 June 1985 (aged 28) | 8 | 0 | (United States Soccer Federation) Sky Blue |
| 23 | FW | Christen Press | 29 December 1988 (aged 25) | 15 | 11 | (Swedish Football Association) Tyresö |
| 25 | DF | Meghan Klingenberg | 2 August 1988 (aged 25) | 6 | 0 | (Swedish Football Association) Tyresö |

== Group C ==
=== Austria ===
The squad was announced on 24 February 2014.

Head coach: Dominik Thalhammer

| No. | Pos. | Player | Date of birth (age) | Caps | Goals | Club |
|---|---|---|---|---|---|---|
| 1 | GK | Anna-Carina Kristler | 17 July 1988 (aged 25) | | | (Austrian Football Association) Sturm Graz |
| 2 | MF | Julia Tabotta | 25 July 1994 (aged 19) | | | (Austrian Football Association) St. Pölten |
| 3 | MF | Jennifer Pöltl | 4 August 1993 (aged 20) | | | (Austrian Football Association) St. Pölten |
| 4 | DF | Romina Bell | 14 May 1993 (aged 20) | | | (United States Soccer Federation) AIC Yellow Jackets |
| 6 | MF | Jelena Prvulovic | 16 September 1994 (aged 19) | | | (Austrian Football Association) Landhaus |
| 7 | MF | Laura Feiersinger | 5 April 1993 (aged 20) | | | (German Football Association) Bayern Munich |
| 8 | MF | Nadine Prohaska | 15 August 1990 (aged 23) | | | (Austrian Football Association) St. Pölten |
| 9 | MF | Sarah Zadrazil | 19 February 1993 (aged 21) | | | (United States Soccer Federation) ETSU Buccaneers |
| 10 | FW | Nina Burger | 27 December 1987 (aged 26) | | | (Austrian Football Association) Neulengbach |
| 11 | MF | Viktoria Schnaderbeck (captain) | 4 January 1991 (aged 23) | | | (German Football Association) Bayern Munich |
| 14 | MF | Heike Manhart | 7 January 1993 (aged 21) | | | (Hungarian Football Federation) Viktória |
| 15 | DF | Virginia Kirchberger | 25 May 1993 (aged 20) | | | (German Football Association) BV Cloppenburg |
| 16 | MF | Jasmin Eder | 8 October 1992 (aged 21) | | | (Austrian Football Association) St. Pölten |
| 17 | MF | Sarah Puntigam | 13 October 1992 (aged 21) | | | (Swiss Football Association) Kriens |
| 18 | DF | Verena Aschauer | 20 January 1994 (aged 20) | | | (German Football Association) BV Cloppenburg |
| 19 | MF | Elisabeth Tieber | 4 July 1990 (aged 23) | | | (Austrian Football Association) Sturm Graz |
| 20 | FW | Lisa Makas | 11 May 1992 (aged 21) | | | (Austrian Football Association) St. Pölten |
| 21 | GK | Manuela Zinsberger | 19 October 1995 (aged 18) | | | (Austrian Football Association) Neulengbach |

=== North Korea ===
Head coach: Kim Kwang-min

| No. | Pos. | Player | Date of birth (age) | Caps | Goals | Club |
|---|---|---|---|---|---|---|
| 1 | GK | Hong Myong-Hui | 4 September 1991 (aged 22) | | | (DPR Korea Football Association) April 25 |
| 3 | DF | Paek Sol-gum | 20 March 1990 (aged 23) | | | (DPR Korea Football Association) Ponghwasan |
| 4 | DF | Jo Jong-sim | 28 June 1993 (aged 20) | | | (DPR Korea Football Association) Rimyongsu |
| 6 | DF | Kim Un-hyang | 26 August 1993 (aged 20) | | | (DPR Korea Football Association) April 25 |
| 7 | MF | Kim Su-gyong | 4 January 1995 (aged 19) | | | (DPR Korea Football Association) April 25 |
| 8 | MF | Kim Un-ju | 9 April 1993 (aged 20) | | | (DPR Korea Football Association) April 25 |
| 9 | MF | Jong Yu-ri | 21 June 1992 (aged 21) | | | (DPR Korea Football Association) Sobaeksu |
| 10 | FW | Ho Un-byol | 19 January 1992 (aged 22) | | | (DPR Korea Football Association) April 25 |
| 11 | FW | Ra Un-sim (captain) | 2 July 1988 (aged 25) | | | (DPR Korea Football Association) Amnokgang |
| 12 | MF | Kim Yun-mi | 1 July 1993 (aged 20) | | | (DPR Korea Football Association) April 25 |
| 13 | MF | Ri Yong-mi | 8 May 1993 (aged 20) | | | (DPR Korea Football Association) Amnokgang |
| 15 | DF | Kim Nam-hui | 4 March 1993 (aged 21) | | | (DPR Korea Football Association) April 25 |
| 16 | DF | Kim Un-ha | 23 March 1993 (aged 20) | | | (DPR Korea Football Association) April 25 |
| 18 | GK | Kim Su-jong | 3 June 1991 (aged 22) | | | (DPR Korea Football Association) April 25 |
| 19 | DF | Yun Song-mi | 28 January 1992 (aged 22) | | | (DPR Korea Football Association) Pyongyang |
| 21 | MF | Cha Un-ju | 7 June 1994 (aged 19) | | | (DPR Korea Football Association) Sobaeksu |

=== Portugal ===
The squad was announced on 28 February 2014.

Head coach: Francisco Neto

| No. | Pos. | Player | Date of birth (age) | Caps | Goals | Club |
|---|---|---|---|---|---|---|
| 1 | GK | Neide Simões | 19 July 1988 (aged 25) | 44 | 0 | (German Football Association) 1. FC Köln |
| 2 | DF | Mónica Mendes | 16 June 1993 (aged 20) | 13 | 0 | (United States Soccer Federation) UTB Ocelots |
| 3 | DF | Mariane Amaro | 17 September 1993 (aged 20) | 14 | 0 | (French Football Federation) Saint-Maur |
| 4 | DF | Sílvia Rebelo | 20 May 1989 (aged 24) | 37 | 1 | (Portuguese Football Federation) Fundacão Laura Santos |
| 5 | DF | Raquel Infante | 19 September 1990 (aged 23) | 2 | 0 | (Italian Football Federation) Riviera di Romagna |
| 6 | DF | Regina Pereira | 13 August 1992 (aged 21) | 22 | 0 | (Portuguese Football Federation) Vilaverdense |
| 7 | MF | Cláudia Neto (captain) | 18 April 1988 (aged 25) | 61 | 2 | (Royal Spanish Football Federation) Espanyol |
| 8 | FW | Carolina Mendes | 27 November 1987 (aged 26) | 13 | 0 | (Italian Football Federation) Riviera di Romagna |
| 9 | FW | Ana Borges | 15 June 1990 (aged 23) | 49 | 8 | (Royal Spanish Football Federation) Atlético Madrid |
| 10 | FW | Catarina Sousa | 25 August 1987 (aged 26) | 12 | 0 | (Portuguese Football Federation) A-dos-Francos |
| 11 | MF | Fátima Pinto | 16 January 1996 (aged 18) | 1 | 0 | (Portuguese Football Federation) Atlético Ouriense |
| 12 | GK | Patrícia Morais | 17 June 1992 (aged 21) | 14 | 0 | (Portuguese Football Federation) A-dos-Francos |
| 13 | DF | Filipa Rodrigues | 4 September 1993 (aged 20) | 8 | 2 | (Portuguese Football Federation) Atlético Ouriense |
| 14 | MF | Dolores Silva | 7 August 1991 (aged 22) | 35 | 3 | (German Football Association) MSV Duisburg |
| 15 | DF | Carole Costa | 3 May 1990 (aged 23) | 41 | 4 | (German Football Association) MSV Duisburg |
| 16 | FW | Laura Luís | 15 August 1992 (aged 21) | 18 | 5 | (German Football Association) MSV Duisburg |
| 17 | FW | Mélissa Gomes | 27 April 1994 (aged 19) | 5 | 0 | (French Football Federation) Juvisy |
| 18 | FW | Jéssica Silva | 11 December 1994 (aged 19) | 14 | 2 | (Portuguese Football Federation) Clube de Albergaria |
| 19 | FW | Diana Silva | 4 June 1995 (aged 18) | 0 | 0 | (Portuguese Football Federation) Atlético Ouriense |
| 20 | MF | Tatiana Pinto | 28 March 1994 (aged 19) | 0 | 0 | (German Football Association) SC Sand |
| 21 | MF | Vanessa Malho | 12 April 1996 (aged 17) | 6 | 0 | (Portuguese Football Federation) Vilaverdense |
| 22 | MF | Stephanie Santos | 14 October 1993 (aged 20) | 0 | 0 | (United States Soccer Federation) Hartford Hawks |
| 23 | DF | Inês Silva | 29 March 1997 (aged 16) | 0 | 0 | (Portuguese Football Federation) Fundacão Laura Santos |

=== Russia ===
The squad was announced on 25 February 2014.

Head coach: Sergei Lavrentyev

| No. | Pos. | Player | Date of birth (age) | Caps | Goals | Club |
|---|---|---|---|---|---|---|
| 1 | GK | Elvira Todua | 31 January 1986 (aged 28) | 74 | 0 | (Russian Football Union) Rossiyanka |
| 2 | DF | Marina Pushkareva | 24 August 1989 (aged 24) | 3 | 0 | (Russian Football Union) Kubanochka Krasnodar |
| 3 | DF | Valentina Orlova | 19 April 1993 (aged 20) | 4 | 0 | (Russian Football Union) Zvezda-2005 Perm |
| 4 | MF | Svetlana Tsidikova | 4 February 1985 (aged 29) | 8 | 0 | (Russian Football Union) Zorky Krasnogorsk |
| 5 | MF | Olga Petrova | 9 July 1986 (aged 27) | 57 | 8 | (German Football Association) VfL Wolfsburg |
| 7 | DF | Ekaterina Dmitrienko | 16 January 1990 (aged 24) | 5 | 0 | (Russian Football Union) Rossiyanka |
| 8 | MF | Ekaterina Lazareva | 25 March 1990 (aged 23) | 0 | 0 | (Football Association of Finland) Kokkola Futis 10 |
| 9 | FW | Elena Danilova | 17 June 1987 (aged 26) | 22 | 9 | (Russian Football Union) Ryazan-VDV |
| 10 | MF | Elena Terekhova | 5 July 1987 (aged 26) | 53 | 5 | (Russian Football Union) Ryazan-VDV |
| 11 | FW | Ekaterina Sochneva | 12 August 1985 (aged 28) | 57 | 18 | (Russian Football Union) Zorky Krasnogorsk |
| 12 | GK | Maria Zhamanakova | 21 August 1989 (aged 24) | 1 | 0 | (Russian Football Union) Zorky Krasnogorsk |
| 13 | MF | Alla Sidorovskaya | 27 July 1983 (aged 30) | 23 | 0 | (Russian Football Union) Izmailovo Moscow |
| 14 | MF | Anastasia Chevtchenko | 10 December 1994 (aged 19) | 2 | 0 | (United States Soccer Federation) Penn Quakers |
| 17 | FW | Ekaterina Pantyukhina | 9 April 1993 (aged 20) | 4 | 0 | (Russian Football Union) Zvezda-2005 Perm |
| 18 | DF | Elena Medved | 23 January 1985 (aged 29) | 35 | 2 | (Russian Football Union) Zorky Krasnogorsk |
| 19 | DF | Ksenia Tsybutovich (captain) | 26 June 1987 (aged 26) | 61 | 3 | (Russian Football Union) Ryazan-VDV |
| 20 | FW | Nelli Korovkina | 1 November 1989 (aged 24) | 16 | 5 | (Russian Football Union) Izmailovo Moscow |
| 21 | GK | Alain Beliaeva | 13 February 1992 (aged 22) | 0 | 0 | (Russian Football Union) Mordovochka |
| 23 | MF | Elena Morozova | 15 March 1987 (aged 26) | 66 | 14 | (Russian Football Union) Zorky Krasnogorsk |

== Player representation ==
=== By club ===
Clubs with 5 or more players represented are listed.

| Players | Club |
|---|---|
| 9 | (Germany) 1. FFC Frankfurt, (North Korea) April 25 |
| 8 | (Germany) VfL Wolfsburg, (Sweden) Tyresö |
| 7 | (Sweden) Rosengård |
| 6 | (Denmark) Brøndby, (Denmark) Fortuna Hjørring, (Germany) Bayern Munich, (Germany) Turbine Potsdam, (Iceland) Stjarnan, (Norway) Stabæk |
| 5 | (Austria) St. Pölten, (Japan) INAC Kobe Leonessa, (Russia) Zorky Krasnogorsk, (United States) Seattle Reign |

=== By club nationality ===
| Players | Clubs |
|---|---|
| 43 | Germany |
| 27 | Sweden |
| 25 | United States |
| 23 | China |
| 21 | Norway |
| 18 | Denmark |
| 16 | North Korea, Russia |
| 14 | Iceland |
| 12 | Japan |
| 10 | Austria, Portugal |
| 8 | France |
| 4 | England, Italy |
| 2 | Australia, Spain |
| 1 | Finland, Hungary, Switzerland |

=== By club federation ===
| Players | Federation |
|---|---|
| 180 | UEFA |
| 53 | AFC |
| 25 | CONCACAF |

=== By representatives of domestic league ===
| National squad | Players |
|---|---|
| China | 23 |
| Germany | 20 |
| Norway | 19 |
| Denmark | 18 |
| United States | 18 |
| North Korea | 16 |
| Russia | 16 |
| Sweden | 15 |
| Iceland | 14 |
| Japan | 12 |
| Austria | 10 |
| Portugal | 10 |
