= 2013 Algarve Cup squads =

Women's football tournament squads

This article lists the squads for the 2013 Algarve Cup, held in Portugal. The 12 national teams involved in the tournament were required to register a squad of 23 players; only players in these squads were eligible to take part in the tournament.

Players marked (c) were named as captain for their national squad.

Age, caps and goals as of 6 March 2013.

== Group A ==
=== Germany ===
Coach: (Germany) Silvia Neid

No.	Pos.	Player	Date of birth (age)	Caps	Goals	Club
	GK	Nadine Angerer (c)	10 November 1978 (aged 34)	112	0	(German Football Association) 1. FFC Frankfurt
	GK	Almuth Schult	4 June 1987 (aged 25)	8	0	(German Football Association) SC 07 Bad Neuenahr
	GK	Laura Benkarth	14 October 1992 (aged 20)			(German Football Association) SC Freiburg
	DF	Saskia Bartusiak	9 September 1982 (aged 30)	61	0	(German Football Association) 1. FFC Frankfurt
	DF	Jennifer Cramer	24 February 1993 (aged 20)	5	0	(German Football Association) 1. FFC Turbine Potsdam
	DF	Josephine Henning	8 September 1989 (aged 23)	10	0	(German Football Association) VfL Wolfsburg
	DF	Leonie Maier	29 September 1992 (aged 20)	7	2	(German Football Association) SC 07 Bad Neuenahr
	DF	Babett Peter	12 May 1988 (aged 24)	72	4	(German Football Association) 1. FFC Frankfurt
	DF	Bianca Schmidt	23 January 1990 (aged 23)	30	1	(German Football Association) 1. FFC Turbine Potsdam
	DF	Luisa Wensing	8 February 1993 (aged 20)	4	0	(German Football Association) VfL Wolfsburg
	MF	Melanie Behringer	18 November 1985 (aged 27)	85	24	(German Football Association) 1. FFC Frankfurt
	MF	Linda Bresonik	6 December 1983 (aged 29)	81	8	(French Football Federation) Paris Saint-Germain
	MF	Verena Faißt	22 May 1989 (aged 23)	13	1	(German Football Association) VfL Wolfsburg
	MF	Lena Goeßling	8 March 1986 (aged 26)	42	3	(German Football Association) VfL Wolfsburg
	MF	Svenja Huth	25 January 1991 (aged 22)	8	0	(German Football Association) 1. FFC Frankfurt
	MF	Nadine Keßler	4 April 1988 (aged 24)	3	1	(German Football Association) VfL Wolfsburg
	MF	Kim Kulig	9 April 1990 (aged 22)	3	1	(German Football Association) 1. FFC Frankfurt
	MF	Viola Odebrecht	11 February 1983 (aged 30)	45	2	(German Football Association) VfL Wolfsburg
	FW	Célia Okoyino da Mbabi	27 June 1988 (aged 24)	71	35	(German Football Association) SC 07 Bad Neuenahr
	FW	Lena Lotzen	11 September 1993 (aged 19)	7	4	(German Football Association) FC Bayern Munich
	FW	Dzsenifer Marozsán	18 April 1992 (aged 20)	9	5	(German Football Association) 1. FFC Frankfurt
	FW	Anja Mittag	18 April 1980 (aged 32)	82	15	(Swedish Football Association) LdB FC Malmö
	FW	Alexandra Popp	6 April 1991 (aged 21)	31	19	(German Football Association) VfL Wolfsburg

=== Denmark ===
Coach: (Denmark) Kenneth Heiner-Møller

No.	Pos.	Player	Date of birth (age)	Caps	Goals	Club
	GK	Cecilie Sørensen	25 March 1987 (aged 25)			(Danish Football Association) B.93/HIK/Skjold
16	GK	Stina Lykke Petersen	9 February 1986 (aged 27)	9	0	(Danish Football Association) Brøndby IF
4	DF	Christina Ørntoft	2 July 1985 (aged 27)	50	1	(Swedish Football Association) LdB Malmö FC
5	DF	Janni Arnth Jensen	15 October 1986 (aged 26)	28	1	(Danish Football Association) Fortuna Hjørring
2	DF	Line Røddik	31 January 1988 (aged 25)	69	8	(Swedish Football Association) Tyresö FF
15	DF	Line Sigvardsen Jensen	23 August 1991 (aged 21)	13	1	(Danish Football Association) Fortuna Hjørring
	DF	Malene Marquard	2 February 1983 (aged 30)	13	0	(Danish Football Association) Brøndby IF
8	DF	Theresa Nielsen	20 July 1986 (aged 26)	45	3	(Danish Football Association) Brøndby IF
13	MF	Johanna Rasmussen	2 July 1983 (aged 29)	93	26	(Swedish Football Association) Kristianstads DFF
	MF	Julie Rydahl Bukh	9 January 1982 (aged 31)	50	4	(United States Soccer Federation) Pali Blues
3	MF	Katrine Pedersen (captain)	13 April 1977 (aged 35)	192	8	(Norwegian Football Federation) Stabæk
11	MF	Katrine Veje	19 June 1991 (aged 21)	41	4	(Swedish Football Association) LdB Malmö FC
6	MF	Mariann Gajhede Knudsen	16 November 1984 (aged 28)	80	1	(Swedish Football Association) Linköpings FC
18	MF	Mia Brogaard	15 October 1981 (aged 31)	62	3	(Danish Football Association) Brøndby IF
12	MF	Nanna Christiansen	17 June 1989 (aged 23)	35	4	(Danish Football Association) Brøndby IF
5	MF	Simone Boye Sørensen	3 March 1992 (aged 21)			(Danish Football Association) B52 Aalborg
	MF	Sine Hovesen	19 August 1987 (aged 25)	13	1	(Danish Football Association) Fortuna Hjørring
14	MF	Sofie Junge Pedersen	24 April 1992 (aged 20)	3	1	(Danish Football Association) Fortuna Hjørring
7	FW	Anja Thorsen	28 September 1981 (aged 31)			(Danish Football Association) Brøndby IF
	FW	Lise Munk	26 May 1989 (aged 23)			(Danish Football Association) Brøndby IF
9	FW	Nadia Nadim	2 January 1988 (aged 25)	30	4	(Danish Football Association) Fortuna Hjørring
10	FW	Pernille Harder	15 November 1992 (aged 20)	31	16	(Swedish Football Association) Linköpings FC
7	FW	Sanne Troelsgaard Nielsen	15 August 1988 (aged 24)	47	14	(Danish Football Association) Brøndby IF

=== Japan ===
Coach: (Japan) Norio Sasaki

No.	Pos.	Player	Date of birth (age)	Caps	Goals	Club
1	GK	Ayumi Kaihori	4 September 1986 (aged 26)	34	0	(Japan Football Association) INAC Kobe Leonessa
2	DF	Saori Ariyoshi	1 November 1987 (aged 25)	5	0	(Japan Football Association) NTV Beleza
3	DF	Azusa Iwashimizu	14 October 1992 (aged 20)	85	8	(Japan Football Association) NTV Beleza
4	DF	Saki Kumagai	17 October 1990 (aged 22)	49	0	(German Football Association) 1. FFC Frankfurt
5	DF	Aya Sameshima	16 June 1987 (aged 25)	52	2	(Japan Football Association) Vegalta Sendai
7	DF	Kana Osafune	16 October 1989 (aged 23)	4	0	(Japan Football Association) Vegalta Sendai
9	MF	Nahomi Kawasumi	23 September 1985 (aged 27)	39	9	(Japan Football Association) INAC Kobe Leonessa
11	FW	Ami Ōtaki	28 July 1989 (aged 23)	1	0	(French Football Federation) Olympique Lyon
12	GK	Erina Yamane	20 December 1990 (aged 22)	1	0	(Japan Football Association) JEF United Ichihara Chiba
13	MF	Rumi Utsugi	5 December 1988 (aged 24)	54	5	(French Football Federation) Montpellier HSC
14	MF	Asuna Tanaka	23 April 1988 (aged 24)	18	3	(Japan Football Association) INAC Kobe Leonessa
15	MF	Megumi Takase	10 November 1990 (aged 22)	29	5	(Japan Football Association) INAC Kobe Leonessa
16	DF	Yūri Kawamura	17 May 1989 (aged 23)	2	0	(Japan Football Association) JEF United Ichihara Chiba
17	FW	Yūki Ōgimi	15 July 1987 (aged 25)	91	41	(German Football Association) 1. FFC Turbine Potsdam
18	DF	Yuka Kado	19 June 1990 (aged 22)	0	0	(Japan Football Association) Okayama Yunogo Belle
19	MF	Marumi Yamazaki	9 June 1990 (aged 22)	0	0	(Japan Football Association) Albirex Niigata
20	MF	Emi Nakajima	27 September 1990 (aged 22)	2	0	(Japan Football Association) INAC Kobe Leonessa
21	GK	Fubuki Kubo	27 December 1989 (aged 23)	0	0	(Japan Football Association) Iga Football Club Kunoichi
22	MF	Yōko Tanaka	30 July 1993 (aged 19)	0	0	(Japan Football Association) INAC Kobe Leonessa
23	FW	Shiho Ogawa	26 December 1988 (aged 24)	0	0	(Japan Football Association) JEF United Ichihara Chiba
24	FW	Asano Nagasato	24 January 1989 (aged 24)	4	0	(German Football Association) 1. FFC Turbine Potsdam
25	MF	Mari Kawamura	19 December 1988 (aged 24)	0	0	(Japan Football Association) Fukuoka J. Anclas
26	FW	Mina Tanaka	28 April 1994 (aged 18)	0	0	(Japan Football Association) NTV Beleza

=== Norway ===
Coach: (Norway) Even Pellerud

No.	Pos.	Player	Date of birth (age)	Caps	Goals	Club
1	GK	Ingrid Hjelmseth	10 April 1980 (aged 32)	59	0	(Norwegian Football Federation) Stabæk Fotball
12	GK	Caroline Knutsen	21 November 1983 (aged 29)	9	0	(Norwegian Football Federation) Røa IL
	GK	Nora Gjøen	20 February 1992 (aged 21)			(Norwegian Football Federation) Sandviken
	DF	Ingrid Ryland	29 May 1989 (aged 23)	7	0	(Norwegian Football Federation) Arna-Bjørnar
17	DF	Kristine Wigdahl Hegland	8 August 1992 (aged 20)	11	0	(Norwegian Football Federation) Arna-Bjørnar
3	DF	Marit Fiane Christensen	11 December 1980 (aged 32)	71	10	(Norwegian Football Federation) Røa IL
	DF	Solfrid Andersen	13 May 1982 (aged 30)			(Norwegian Football Federation) SK Trondheims-Ørn
2	DF	Marita Skammelsrud Lund	29 January 1989 (aged 24)	38	2	(Norwegian Football Federation) LSK Kvinner FK
5	DF	Toril Hetland Akerhaugen	5 March 1982 (aged 31)	41	0	(Norwegian Football Federation) Stabæk
	DF	June Roa Hammersland	5 February 1984 (aged 29)			(Norwegian Football Federation) IL Sandviken
15	DF	Nora Holstad Berge	26 March 1987 (aged 25)	17	0	(Swedish Football Association) Linköpings FC
6	DF	Maren Mjelde	6 November 1989 (aged 23)	48	5	(German Football Association) Turbine Potsdam
	MF	Ingvild Stensland	3 August 1981 (aged 31)	115	8	(Norwegian Football Federation) Stabæk
8	MF	Caroline Graham Hansen	18 February 1995 (aged 18)	9	1	(Norwegian Football Federation) Stabæk
8	MF	Solveig Gulbrandsen	12 January 1981 (aged 32)	156	47	(Norwegian Football Federation) Vålerenga Fotball
13	MF	Gry Tofte Ims	2 March 1986 (aged 27)	23	3	(Norwegian Football Federation) Klepp IL
4	MF	Mari Karoline Knudsen	17 February 1984 (aged 29)	5	1	(Norwegian Football Federation) LSK Kvinner FK
11	MF	Leni Larsen Kaurin	21 March 1981 (aged 31)	86	4	(Norwegian Football Federation) Stabæk Fotball Kvinner
14	FW	Ingvild Landvik Isaksen	10 February 1989 (aged 24)	18	0	(Norwegian Football Federation) Kolbotn IL
9	FW	Ada Hegerberg	10 July 1995 (aged 17)	2	0	(Norwegian Football Federation) Stabæk
9	FW	Isabell Herlovsen	23 June 1988 (aged 24)	80	31	(Norwegian Football Federation) LSK Kvinner FK
16	FW	Elise Thorsnes	14 August 1988 (aged 24)	57	10	(Norwegian Football Federation) Røa IL
16	FW	Lene Mykjåland	20 February 1987 (aged 26)	38	8	(Norwegian Football Federation) Røa IL

== Group B ==
=== China ===
Coach: (China) Li Xiaopeng

=== Iceland ===
Coach: (Iceland) Sigurður Ragnar Eyjólfsson

No.	Pos.	Player	Club
	GK	Guðbjörg Gunnarsdóttir	(Sweden) Djurgården
1	GK	Þóra Björg Helgadóttir	(Sweden) Malmö
8	DF	Katrín Jónsdóttir	(Sweden) Djurgården
3	DF	Rakel Hönnudóttir	(Iceland) Breiðablik
	DF	Sif Atladóttir	(Sweden) Kristianstad
4	DF	Hallbera Guðný Gísladóttir	(Sweden) Piteå
18	DF	Mist Edvarsdóttir	(Iceland) Valur
20	DF	Elísa Viðarsdóttir	(Iceland) ÍBV
	DF	Birna Kristinsdóttir	(Iceland) Breiðablik UBK
	MF	Edda Garðarsdóttir	(England) Chelsea L.F.C.
10	MF	Dóra María Lárusdóttir	(Iceland) Valur
6	MF	Hólmfríður Magnúsdóttir	(Iceland) Valur
	MF	Ólína Guðbjörg Viðarsdóttir	(England) Chelsea L.F.C.
7	MF	Sara Björk Gunnarsdóttir	(Sweden) Malmö
11	MF	Katrín Ómarsdóttir	(England) Liverpool L.F.C.
5	MF	Guðný Björk Óðinsdóttir	(Sweden) Kristianstad
19	MF	Gunnhildur Yrsa Jónsdóttir	(Iceland) Stjarnan
	MF	Sandra María Jessen	(Iceland) Þór/KA
	MF	Glódís Perla Viggósdóttir	(Iceland) Stjarnan
14	FW	Fanndís Friðriksdóttir	(Iceland) Breiðablik
	FW	Dagný Brynjarsdóttir	(Iceland) Valur
15	FW	Harpa Þorsteinsdóttir	(Iceland) Stjarnan
	FW	Elín Metta Jensen	(Iceland) Valur

=== Sweden ===
Coach: (Sweden) Pia Sundhage

No.	Pos.	Player	Date of birth (age)	Caps	Goals	Club
22	GK	Kristin Hammarström	29 March 1982 (aged 30)	15	0	(Swedish Football Association) Göteborg
18	GK	Sofia Lundgren	20 September 1982 (aged 30)	26	0	(Swedish Football Association) Linköping
	GK	Carola Söberg	29 July 1982 (aged 30)	86	0	(Swedish Football Association) Tyresö
3	DF	Emma Berglund	19 December 1988 (aged 24)	11	0	(Swedish Football Association) Umeå
5	DF	Nilla Fischer (c)	2 August 1984 (aged 28)	90	12	(Swedish Football Association) Linköping
17	DF	Malin Levenstad	13 September 1988 (aged 24)	6	0	(Swedish Football Association) Malmö
13	DF	Lina Nilsson	17 June 1987 (aged 25)	34	0	(Swedish Football Association) Malmö
	DF	Jessica Samuelsson	30 January 1992 (aged 21)	0	0	(Swedish Football Association) Linköpings FC
4	DF	Annica Svensson	3 March 1983 (aged 30)	28	0	(Swedish Football Association) Tyresö
6	DF	Sara Thunebro	26 April 1979 (aged 33)	93	3	(German Football Association) FFC Frankfurt
14	MF	Johanna Almgren	22 March 1984 (aged 28)	40	0	(Swedish Football Association) Göteborg
9	MF	Kosovare Asllani	29 July 1989 (aged 23)	36	6	(French Football Federation) Paris
7	MF	Lisa Dahlkvist	6 February 1987 (aged 26)	56	7	(Swedish Football Association) Tyresö
	MF	Hanna Folkesson	15 June 1988 (aged 24)	56	7	(Swedish Football Association) Umeå
11	MF	Antonia Göransson	16 September 1990 (aged 22)	24	4	(German Football Association) FFC Turbine Potsdam
12	MF	Marie Hammarström	29 March 1982 (aged 30)	23	1	(Swedish Football Association) Örebro
	MF	Carina Holmberg	4 October 1983 (aged 29)	23	1	(Swedish Football Association) Sunnanå SK
10	MF	Sofia Jakobsson	23 April 1990 (aged 22)	17	3	(The Football Association) Chelsea
	MF	Emmelie Konradsson	4 September 1989 (aged 23)			(Swedish Football Association) Umeå
15	MF	Caroline Seger	19 March 1985 (aged 27)	93	13	(Swedish Football Association) Tyresö
	MF	Olivia Schough	11 March 1991 (aged 21)	0	0	(Swedish Football Association) Göteborg FC
19	FW	Susanne Moberg	13 February 1986 (aged 27)	8	0	(Swedish Football Association) Kristianstad
8	FW	Lotta Schelin	27 February 1984 (aged 29)	107	45	(French Football Federation) Lyon

=== United States ===
Coach: (Scotland) Tom Sermanni

No.	Pos.	Player	Date of birth (age)	Caps	Goals	Club
18	GK	Nicole Barnhart	10 October 1981 (aged 31)	47	0	(United States Soccer Federation) FC Kansas City
24	GK	Ashlyn Harris	19 October 1985 (aged 27)	0	0	(German Football Association) FCR 2001 Duisburg
21	GK	Jillian Loyden	25 June 1985 (aged 27)	5	0	(United States Soccer Federation) Sky Blue FC
19	DF	Rachel Buehler	26 August 1985 (aged 27)	99	3	(United States Soccer Federation) Portland Thorns FC
6	DF	Crystal Dunn	3 July 1992 (aged 20)	1	0	(United States Soccer Federation) North Carolina
14	DF	Whitney Engen	28 November 1987 (aged 25)	3	0	(The Football Association) Liverpool
11	DF	Ali Krieger	28 July 1984 (aged 28)	29	0	(United States Soccer Federation) Washington Spirit
5	DF	Kelley O'Hara	4 August 1988 (aged 24)	35	0	(United States Soccer Federation) Sky Blue FC
3	DF	Christie Rampone (captain)	24 June 1975 (aged 37)	277	4	(United States Soccer Federation) Sky Blue FC
4	DF	Becky Sauerbrunn	6 June 1985 (aged 27)	38	0	(United States Soccer Federation) FC Kansas City
16	MF	Yael Averbuch	3 November 1986 (aged 26)	17	1	(Swedish Football Association) Kopparbergs/Göteborg FC
7	MF	Shannon Boxx	29 June 1977 (aged 35)	182	26	(United States Soccer Federation) Chicago Red Stars
12	MF	Lauren Cheney	30 September 1987 (aged 25)	84	18	(United States Soccer Federation) FC Kansas City
17	MF	Tobin Heath	29 May 1988 (aged 24)	62	7	(French Football Federation) Paris Saint-Germain
10	MF	Carli Lloyd	16 July 1982 (aged 30)	153	43	(United States Soccer Federation) Western New York Flash
8	MF	Kristen Mewis	25 February 1991 (aged 22)	1	0	(United States Soccer Federation) FC Kansas City
9	MF	Heather O'Reilly	2 January 1985 (aged 28)	180	36	(United States Soccer Federation) Boston Breakers
15	MF	Megan Rapinoe	5 July 1985 (aged 27)	69	20	(French Football Federation) Olympique Lyonnais
22	FW	Lindsey Horan	26 May 1994 (aged 18)	0	0	(French Football Federation) Paris Saint-Germain
2	FW	Sydney Leroux	7 May 1990 (aged 22)	29	15	(United States Soccer Federation) Boston Breakers
13	FW	Alex Morgan	2 July 1989 (aged 23)	59	38	(United States Soccer Federation) Portland Thorns FC
23	FW	Christen Press	29 December 1988 (aged 24)	2	3	(Swedish Football Association) Tyresö FF
20	FW	Abby Wambach	2 June 1980 (aged 32)	200	153	(United States Soccer Federation) Western New York Flash

== Group C ==
=== Portugal ===
Coach: (Portugal) António Violante

No.	Pos.	Player	Date of birth (age)	Caps	Goals	Club
	GK	Jamila Martins	30 May 1988 (aged 24)	9		(Royal Spanish Football Federation) Prainsa Zaragoza
	GK	Patricia Morais	17 June 1992 (aged 20)	1		(Portuguese Football Federation) SU 1º Dezembro
	GK	Neide Simões	19 July 1988 (aged 24)			(German Football Association) SC 07 Bad Neuenahr
	DF	Ana Valinho	19 December 1985 (aged 27)			(Portuguese Football Federation) Clube Atlético Ouriense
	DF	Mary Bento	8 July 1987 (aged 25)			(Portuguese Football Federation) Clube de Albergaria
	DF	Filipa Rodrigues	4 August 1993 (aged 19)			(Portuguese Football Federation) FD Laura Serra
	DF	Mariane Amaro	17 September 1993 (aged 19)			(French Football Federation) Paris Saint-Germain
	DF	Carole Silva	3 May 1990 (aged 22)	18		(German Football Association) SG Essen-Schönebeck
	DF	Mónica Mendes	16 June 1993 (aged 19)			(United States Soccer Federation) UTB-TSC
	MF	Pisco	11 April 1987 (aged 25)			(Portuguese Football Federation) Clube Atlético Ouriense
	MF	Catarina Almeida	16 September 1988 (aged 24)			(Portuguese Football Federation) Clube de Albergaria
	MF	Dolores Silva	7 August 1991 (aged 21)			(German Football Association) FCR 2001 Duisburg
	MF	Cristiana Garcia	1 September 1990 (aged 22)			(Portuguese Football Federation) GD A-dos-Francos
	MF	Laura Luís	15 August 1992 (aged 20)			(Portuguese Football Federation) C.S. Marítimo
	MF	Cláudia Neto	18 April 1988 (aged 24)	36		(Royal Spanish Football Federation) Prainsa Zaragoza
	MF	Patrícia Gouveia	26 April 1987 (aged 25)	2		(Portuguese Football Federation) SU 1º Dezembro
	MF	Regina Pereira	13 August 1992 (aged 20)			(Portuguese Football Federation) Vilaverdense FC
	FW	Jéssica Silva	11 December 1994 (aged 18)			(Portuguese Football Federation) Clube de Albergaria
	FW	Ana Borges	15 June 1990 (aged 22)	24		(Royal Spanish Football Federation) Prainsa Zaragoza
	FW	Andreia Silva	16 March 1985 (aged 27)			(Portuguese Football Federation) S.U. 1º de Dezembro
	FW	Ana Oliveira	23 October 1991 (aged 21)	14		(German Football Association) SGS Essen
	FW	Andrea Rodrigues	6 January 1990 (aged 23)			(United States Soccer Federation) UCF Knights
	FW	Edite Fernandes (captain)	10 October 1979 (aged 33)	97		(United States Soccer Federation) Santa Clarita Blue Heat

=== Mexico ===
Coach: (Mexico) Leonardo Cuéllar

No.	Pos.	Player	Date of birth (age)	Caps	Goals	Club
1	GK	Cecilia Santiago	19 October 1994 (aged 18)	11	0	(United States Soccer Federation) Boston Breakers
12	GK	Pamela Tajonar	2 December 1984 (aged 28)	36	0	(United States Soccer Federation) Western New York Flash
2	DF	Kenti Robles	15 February 1991 (aged 22)	12	0	(Royal Spanish Football Federation) FC Barcelona
3	DF	Marlene Sandoval	18 January 1984 (aged 29)	70	5	(United States Soccer Federation) Portland Thorns FC
4	DF	Jennifer Ruiz	9 August 1983 (aged 29)			(United States Soccer Federation) Seattle Reign FC
5	DF	Paulina Solís	13 March 1996 (aged 16)			(Mexican Football Federation) Colegio Once
13	DF	Bianca Sierra	25 June 1992 (aged 20)			(United States Soccer Federation) Auburn Tigers
14	DF	Arianna Romero	29 July 1992 (aged 20)			(United States Soccer Federation) Nebraska Cornhuskers
19	DF	Mariana Cadena	13 February 1995 (aged 18)			(Mexican Football Federation) ITESM Monterrey
6	MF	Teresa Noyola	15 April 1990 (aged 22)	7	0	(Royal Dutch Football Association) ADO Deen Haag
7	MF	Nayeli Rangel	28 February 1992 (aged 21)	27	3	(United States Soccer Federation) Sky Blue FC
8	MF	Guadalupe Worbis	12 December 1983 (aged 29)	95	22	(United States Soccer Federation) Washington Spirit
10	MF	Dinora Garza	24 January 1988 (aged 25)	30	9	(United States Soccer Federation) Chicago Red Stars
16	MF	Amanda Pérez	31 July 1994 (aged 18)			(United States Soccer Federation) University of Washington
17	MF	Verónica Pérez	18 May 1988 (aged 24)	23	4	(United States Soccer Federation) Western New York Flash
21	MF	Natalia Gómez-Junco	9 October 1992 (aged 20)			(United States Soccer Federation) Louisiana State University
9	FW	Maribel Domínguez	18 November 1978 (aged 34)	90	67	(United States Soccer Federation) Chicago Red Stars
11	FW	Mónica Ocampo	4 January 1987 (aged 26)	36	12	(United States Soccer Federation) Sky Blue FC
15	FW	Desirée Monsiváis	19 January 1988 (aged 25)			(Mexican Football Federation) ITESM Monterrey
18	FW	Anisa Guajardo	10 March 1991 (aged 21)			(United States Soccer Federation) Boston Breakers
20	FW	Renae Cuéllar	24 June 1990 (aged 22)			(United States Soccer Federation) FC Kansas City

=== Wales ===
Coach: (Finland) Jarmo Matikainen

Name	DOB	Club	Caps (goals)	Debut
Goalkeepers
Nicola Davies	28 December 1985 (aged 27)	(England) Liverpool	43 (0)	v Canada 2001–02
Rhian Noakes	13 February 1989 (aged 24)	(Wales) Cardiff City	39 (0)	v Bulgaria, 2006–07
Defenders
Kylie Davies	25 September 1987 (aged 25)	(Sweden) Sunnanå SK	20 (0)	v Belgium, 2009–10
Carys Hawkins	29 November 1989 (aged 23)	(England) Chelsea	0 (0)	
Hayley Ladd	6 October 1993 (aged 19)	(Finland) Kokkola F10	8 (0)	v New Zealand, 2010–11
Danielle Oates	12 December 1994 (aged 18)	(England) Blackburn Rovers	0 (0)	
Lauren Price	25 June 1994 (aged 18)	(Wales) Cardiff City	1 (0)	v Denmark, 2010–11
Nicola Cousins	22 October 1988 (aged 24)	(Wales) Cardiff City		
Sophie Ingle	2 September 1991 (aged 21)	(England) Chelsea	29 (2)	v Azerbaijan, 2009–10
Midfielders
Loren Dykes	5 February 1988 (aged 25)	(England) Bristol Academy	46 (3)	v Netherlands, 2007–08
Jessica Fishlock	14 January 1987 (aged 26)	(United States) Seattle Reign FC	59 (17)	v Switzerland, 2005–06
Michelle Green	18 December 1982 (aged 30)	(England) Bristol Academy	74 (5)	v Scotland, 2001–02
Angharad James	1 June 1994 (aged 18)	(England) Bristol Academy	8 (1)	v Scotland, 27 October 2011
Rachel Hignett	14 September 1995 (aged 17)	(England) Bristol Academy	1 (0)	
Sarah Wiltshire	7 July 1991 (aged 21)	(England) Watford	7 (2)	
Megan Wynne	21 January 1993 (aged 20)	(United States) East Tennessee State Buccaneers	2 (0)	
Forwards
Natasha Harding	2 March 1989 (aged 24)	(England) Bristol Academy	17 (3)	v Switzerland, 2007–08
Shan Jones	3 November 1990 (aged 22)	(United States) Middle Tennessee Blue Raiders		v Luxembourg, 2010–11
Nadia Lawrence	29 November 1989 (aged 23)	(Wales) Cardiff City Ladies F.C.		
Helen Lander	26 April 1986 (aged 26)	(England) Chelsea	40 (25)	v Luxembourg, 2008–09

=== Hungary ===
Coach: (Hungary) Attila Vágó

No.	Pos.	Player	Date of birth (age)	Caps	Goals	Club
1	GK	Réka Szőcs	19 November 1989 (aged 23)	34	0	(Hungarian Football Federation) MTK Hungária FC
22	GK	Júlia Németh	4 October 1991 (aged 21)	1	0	(Hungarian Football Federation) Ferencváros
12	GK	Klaudia Kovács	17 November 1990 (aged 22)	4	0	(Hungarian Football Federation) Astra Hungary FC
9	DF	Szilvia Szeitl	26 April 1987 (aged 25)	39	0	(Hungarian Football Federation) 1. FC Femina
5	DF	Tímea Gál	25 September 1984 (aged 28)	44	0	(Hungarian Football Federation) MTK Hungária FC
18	DF	Szabina Tálosi	20 January 1989 (aged 24)	35	3	(Austrian Football Association) FC Südburgenland
17	DF	Réka Demeter	26 September 1991 (aged 21)	20	0	(Hungarian Football Federation) MTK Hungária FC
15	DF	Alexandra Tóth II	29 January 1991 (aged 22)	26	0	(Hungarian Football Federation) Viktória FC
21	DF	Mercédesz Vesszős	10 January 1992 (aged 21)	0	0	(Hungarian Football Federation) MTK Hungária FC
13	MF	Zsanett Jakabfi	18 February 1990 (aged 23)	16	10	(German Football Association) VfL Wolfsburg
14	MF	Alexandra Szarvas	7 September 1992 (aged 20)	5	0	(German Football Association) VfL Sindelfingen
3	MF	Henrietta Csiszár	15 May 1994 (aged 18)	10	1	(Hungarian Football Federation) MTK Hungária FC
6	MF	Angéla Smuczer	11 February 1982 (aged 31)	75	1	(Hungarian Football Federation) MTK Hungária FC
19	MF	Alexandra Tóth I	18 March 1990 (aged 22)	17	0	(Football Association of Iceland) Thróttur Reykjavík
16	MF	Boglárka Szabó	12 February 1993 (aged 20)	15	0	(Hungarian Football Federation) Astra Hungary FC
20	MF	Lilla Sipos	14 July 1992 (aged 20)	22	5	(Hungarian Football Federation) Viktória FC
7	MF	Gabriella Tóth	16 December 1986 (aged 26)	38	2	(German Football Association) 1. FC Lokomotive Leipzig
8	FW	Anita Pádár	30 March 1979 (aged 33)	99	32	(Hungarian Football Federation) MTK Hungária FC
10	FW	Fanny Vágó	23 July 1991 (aged 21)	40	21	(Hungarian Football Federation) MTK Hungária FC
23	FW	Erika Szuh	21 February 1990 (aged 23)	20	1	(German Football Association) 1. FC Lokomotive Leipzig
11	FW	Zsanett Kaján	16 September 1997 (aged 15)	0	0	(Hungarian Football Federation) Ferencváros
