= Viðarsdóttir =

Viðarsdóttir is an Icelandic patronymic surname, literally meaning "daughter of Viðar". Notable people with the name include:

- Ásdís María Viðarsdóttir (born 1993), Icelandic singer and songwriter
- Elísa Viðarsdóttir (born 1991), Icelandic footballer
- Margrét Lára Viðarsdóttir (born 1986), Icelandic footballer
- Ólína Guðbjörg Viðarsdóttir (born 1981), Icelandic footballer
