= Júlia Németh =

Hungarian footballer

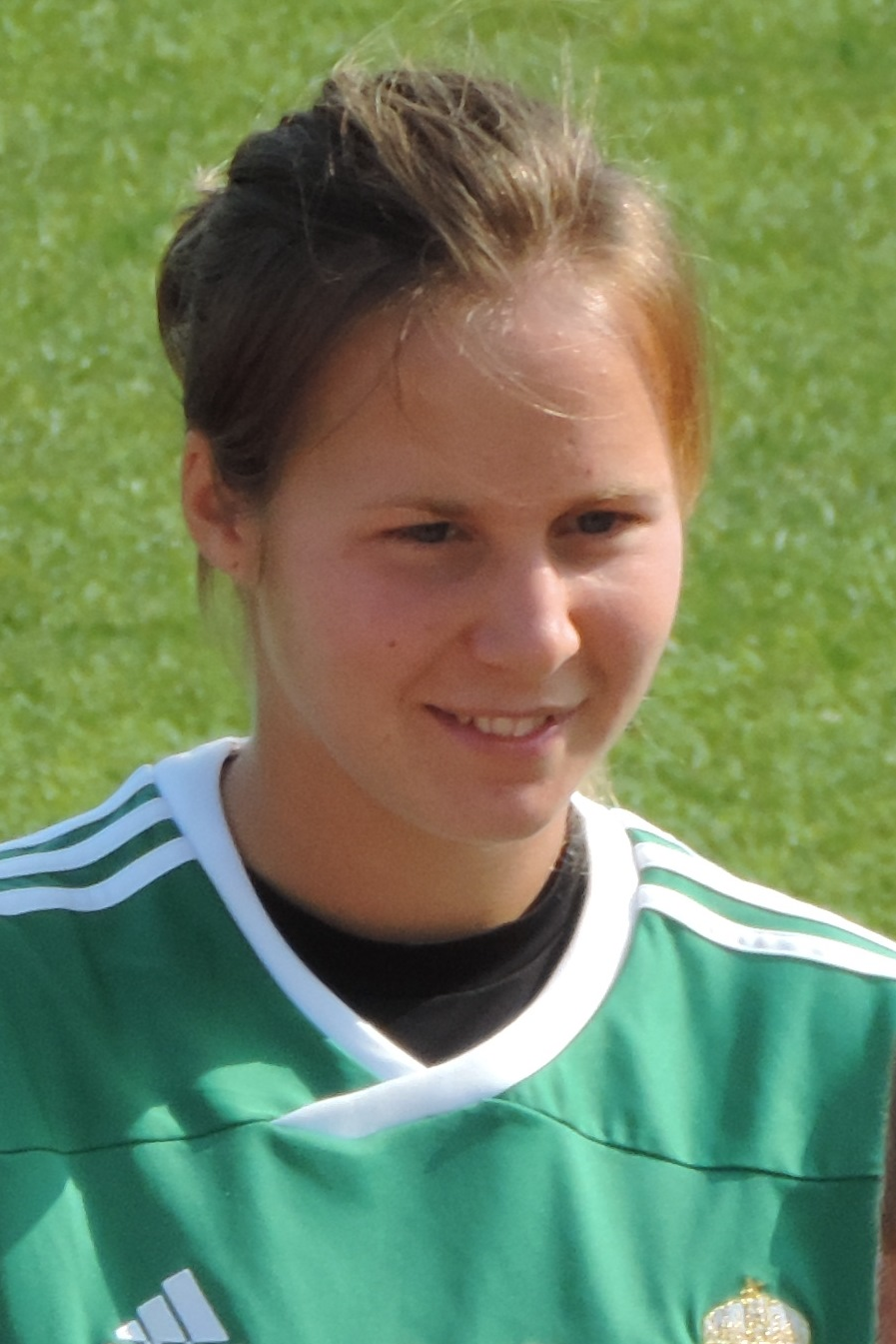

Personal information
- Full name: Júlia Németh
- Date of birth: 4 October 1991 (age 35)
- Place of birth: Veszprém, Hungary
- Position: Goalkeeper

Team information
- Current team: Ferencváros

Senior career*
Years	Team	Apps	(Gls)
?–2005	SK Ajka-Padragkút SE		
2005–2008	Gizella Veszprémi SE		
2008–	Ferencváros		

International career^{‡}
2010–	Hungary	14	(0)
- * Club domestic league appearances and goals ‡ National team caps and goals as of 30 June 2017

Júlia Németh (born 4 October 1991 in Veszprém) is a Hungarian football goalkeeper currently playing in the Hungarian First Division for Ferencváros. She is a member of the Hungarian national team.
