= Inês Silva =

Portuguese association football player

Personal information
- Full name: Inês Isabel Santos Silva
- Date of birth: 29 March 1997 (age 29)
- Height: 1.62 m (5 ft 4 in)
- Position: Defender

Team information
- Current team: Sporting

International career
Years	Team	Apps	(Gls)
- Portugal

Inês Silva (born 29 March 1997) is a Portuguese professional footballer who plays as a defender for Sporting and the Portugal women's national football team.
