= Elisabeth Tieber =

Austrian footballer

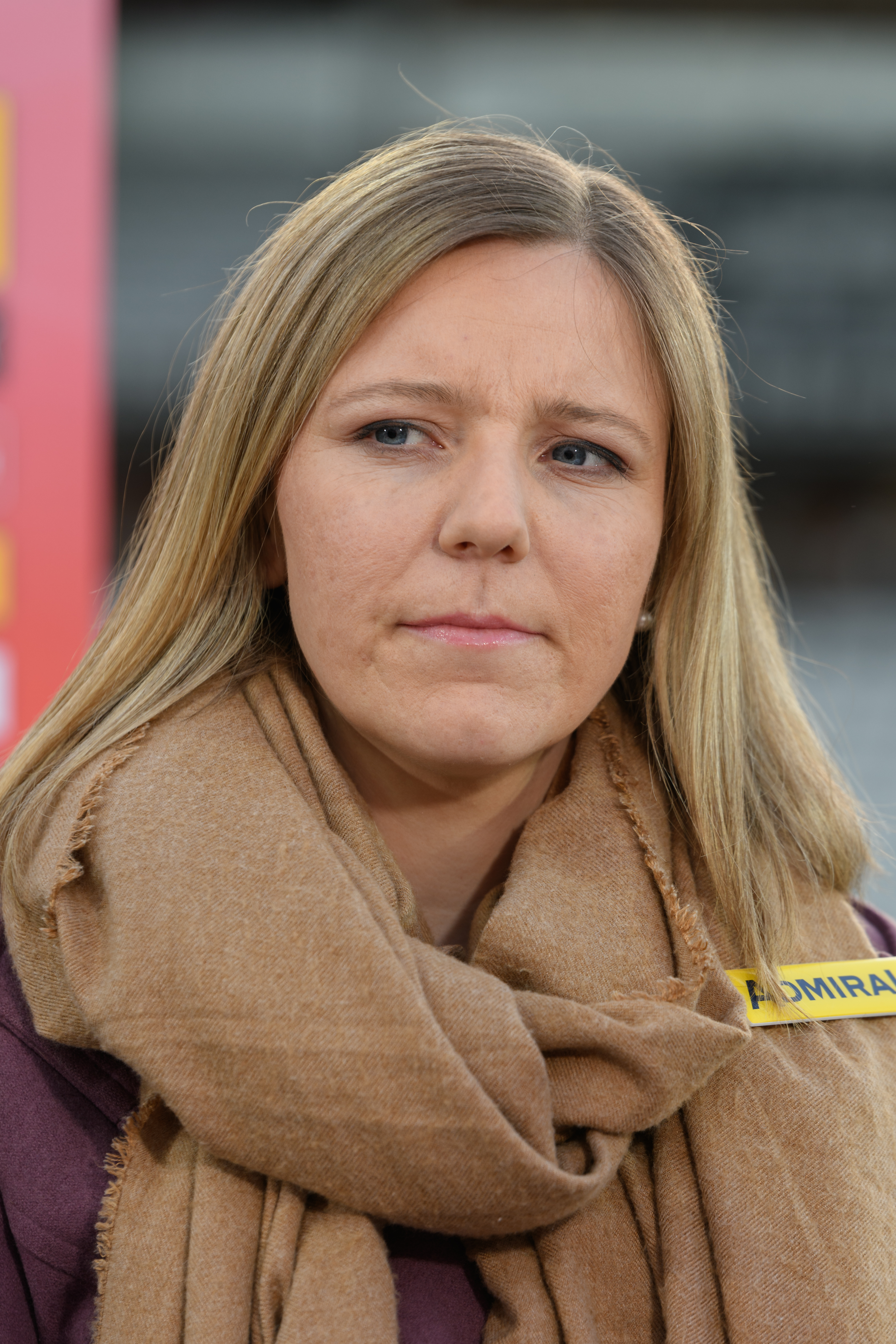
- Tieber in 2018

Personal information
- Date of birth: 4 July 1990 (age 36)
- Place of birth: Graz, Austria
- Height: 1.64 m (5 ft 5 in)
- Position: Defender

Senior career*
Years	Team	Apps	(Gls)
2005–2008	LUV Graz		
2008–2009	USC Landhaus		
2009–2010	JSV Mariatrost		
2010–2013	VfL Sindelfingen	44	(1)
2013–2014	Sturm Graz		
2014	Luzern		
2015–2016	FC Neunkirch		

International career
2008–?	Austria	24	(1)
- * Club domestic league appearances and goals

Elisabeth Tieber (born 4 July 1990) is an Austrian former footballer who played as a defender for the Austria national team.

== Club career ==
Tieber started her career as a youth player at SV Andritz. After that she played in Austria at DFC LUV Graz USC Landhaus and JSV Mariatrost. In the summer of 2010 she joined VfL Sindelfingen in Germany. After a year back at Sturm Graz in Austria, she transferred to Switzerland: first at FC Luzern and later at Nationalliga A club FC Neunkirch starting in February 2015.

== International career ==
Tieber represented Austria on the Austria national team from 2008. Her debut was on 21 June 2008 in the home game against Norway in the qualifying round for the 2009 UEFA Women's Championship. She was subbed in for Irene Fuhrmann in minute 58. One A-international match later she scored her first goal against Israel. She previously represented her country at the U19 level.
