= Simone Hagelskjær =

Danish footballer

Personal information
- Full name: Simone Hagelskjær
- Date of birth: 2 March 1992 (age 34)
- Place of birth: Viborg, Denmark
- Height: 1.62 m (5 ft 4 in)
- Position: Defender

Team information
- Current team: VSK Aarhus
- Number: 2

Youth career
- Team Viborg

Senior career*
Years	Team	Apps	(Gls)
-2017	IK Skovbakken		
2017-	VSK Aarhus	56	(6)

International career^{‡}
2008	Denmark U17	4	(0)
2010	Denmark U19	6	(0)
2015	Denmark U23	1	(0)
2014	Denmark	2	(0)
- * Club domestic league appearances and goals as of 29 June 2020 ‡ National team caps and goals as of 29 June 2020

Simone Hagelskjær (born 2 March 1992) is a Danish football player who plays as a defender for VSK Aarhus in Denmark top-division Elitedivisionen and has appeared for the Denmark women's national football team.

She made her international debut on the Danish national team, on 10 March 2014.

== Honours ==
- Elitedivisionen
  - Bronze Medalist: 2019
