= Edda Garðarsdóttir =

Icelandic footballer and coach (born 1979)

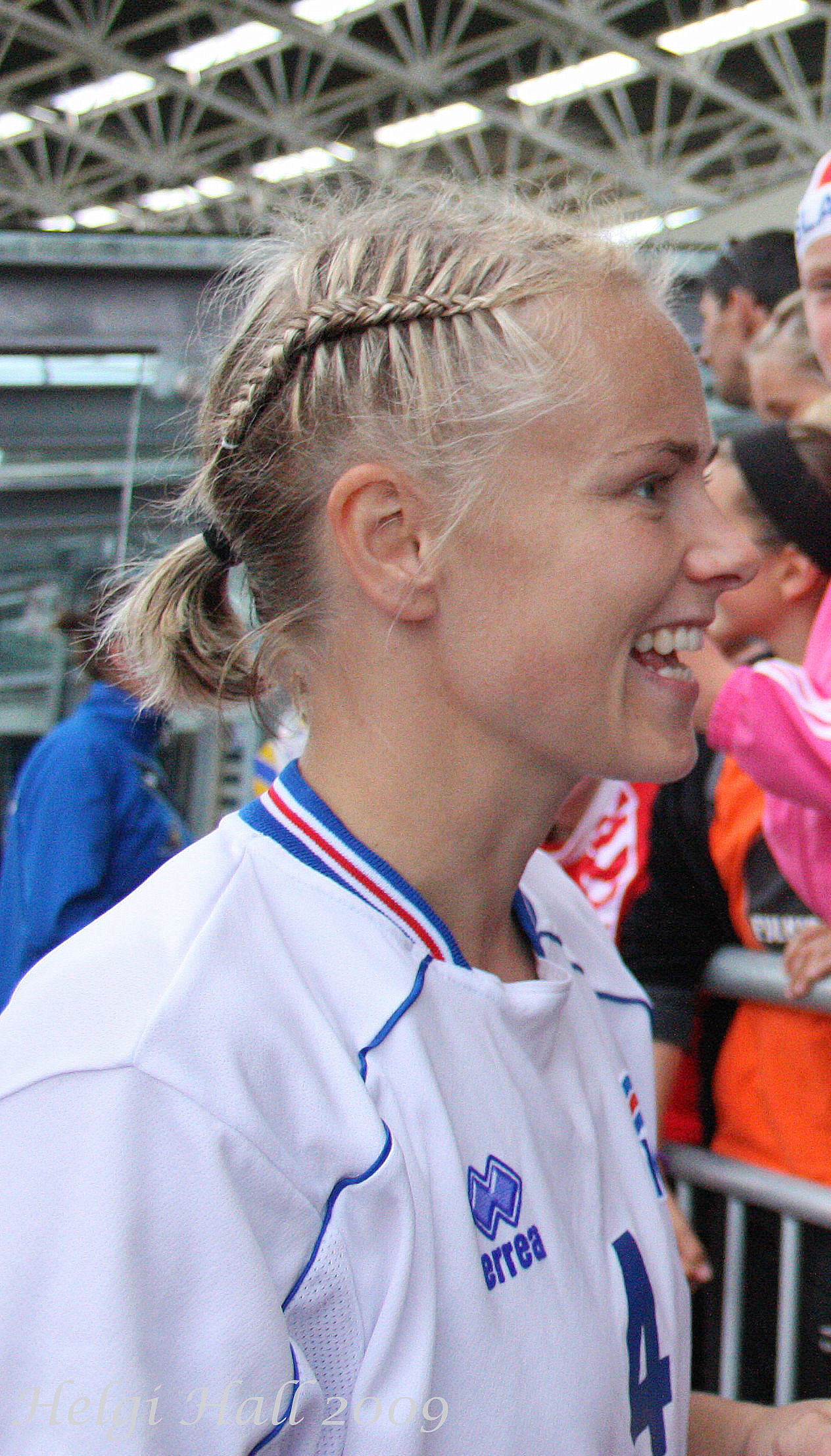
- Garðarsdóttir in 2009

Personal information
- Full name: Edda Garðarsdóttir
- Date of birth: 15 July 1979 (age 47)
- Place of birth: Reykjavík, Iceland
- Height: 1.72 m (5 ft 8 in)
- Position: Midfielder

Youth career
- 2000–2003: Richmond Spiders

Senior career*
| Years | Team | Apps | (Gls) |
| 1992 | KR | 1 | (0) |
| 1993–1994 | Valur Reyðarfirði | | |
| 1995–2000 | KR | 61 | (11) |
| 2000 | Vorup FB | | |
| 2000–2004 | KR | 48 | (13) |
| 2005–2006 | Breiðablik | 34 | (16) |
| 2007–2008 | KR | 39 | (7) |
| 2009–2012 | KIF Örebro DFF | 91 | (11) |
| 2013 | Chelsea Ladies | 5 | (0) |
| 2013–2014 | Valur | 9 | (2) |

International career^{‡}
| 1995 | Iceland U-17 | 5 | (0) |
| 1997 | Iceland U-19 | 1 | (1) |
| 1996–2003 | Iceland U-21 | 21 | (2) |
| 1999–2013 | Iceland | 103 | (4) |

Managerial career
- 2013–2014: Valur (assistant, strength and conditioning)
- 2015: KR (assistant, strength and conditioning)
- 2016–2017: KR
- * Club domestic league appearances and goals as of 23:59, 9 August 2013 ‡ National team caps and goals as of 23:59, 28 February 2018

Edda Garðarsdóttir (born 15 July 1979) is an Icelandic football coach and former player who last managed Úrvalsdeild club KR. Since her debut in 1997 she has accrued over 100 caps for Iceland's national team and competed at the UEFA Women's Euro 2009 finals in Finland.

== Club career ==
After a spell in Denmark with Vorup FB, Edda enrolled at the University of Richmond and played college soccer for the Richmond Spiders.

From 2009 until 2012 Edda, a box-to-box midfielder, played club football in Sweden for KIF Örebro DFF. Along with Ólína Guðbjörg Viðarsdóttir, she moved to Chelsea Ladies of the English FA WSL in January 2013. An interview Edda gave in May 2013 revealed that club rules prevented Ladies players from talking to their male clubmates, unless the male player had initiated the conversation. In July the duo left Chelsea to sign for Valur in their homeland.

== International career ==
When national team coach Siggi Eyjólfsson named his Iceland squad for UEFA Women's Euro 2013 in June 2013, Edda was conspicuously absent from the list.

== Personal life ==
In June 2012 Edda's partner Ólína Guðbjörg Viðarsdóttir gave birth to the couple's first child, a daughter.

== Achievements ==
- Icelandic champion six times.
- Icelandic Women's Cup winner five times.
- Swedish Cup one time.

== Honours ==
- Player of the Year at KR in 2004.
- Player of the Year in Breiðablik 2005 and 2006.

== See also ==
- Foreign players in the FA WSL
