= Marina Pushkareva =

Russian footballer (born 1989)

Personal information
- Full name: Marina Pushkareva
- Date of birth: 24 August 1989 (age 37)
- Height: 1.65 m (5 ft 5 in)
- Position: Defender

Senior career*
Years	Team	Apps	(Gls)
2006	Universitet Vitebsk		
2007–2015	Kubanochka Krasnodar		
2016	Astana		
2017–	Donchanka Azov		

International career
2013–2014	Russia	3	(0)
- * Club domestic league appearances and goals

Marina Pushkareva (born 24 August 1989) is a Russian footballer.

Pushkareva played for the club Kubanochka Krasnodar in the Russia women's national football team.
