= Mercédesz Vesszős =

Hungarian footballer

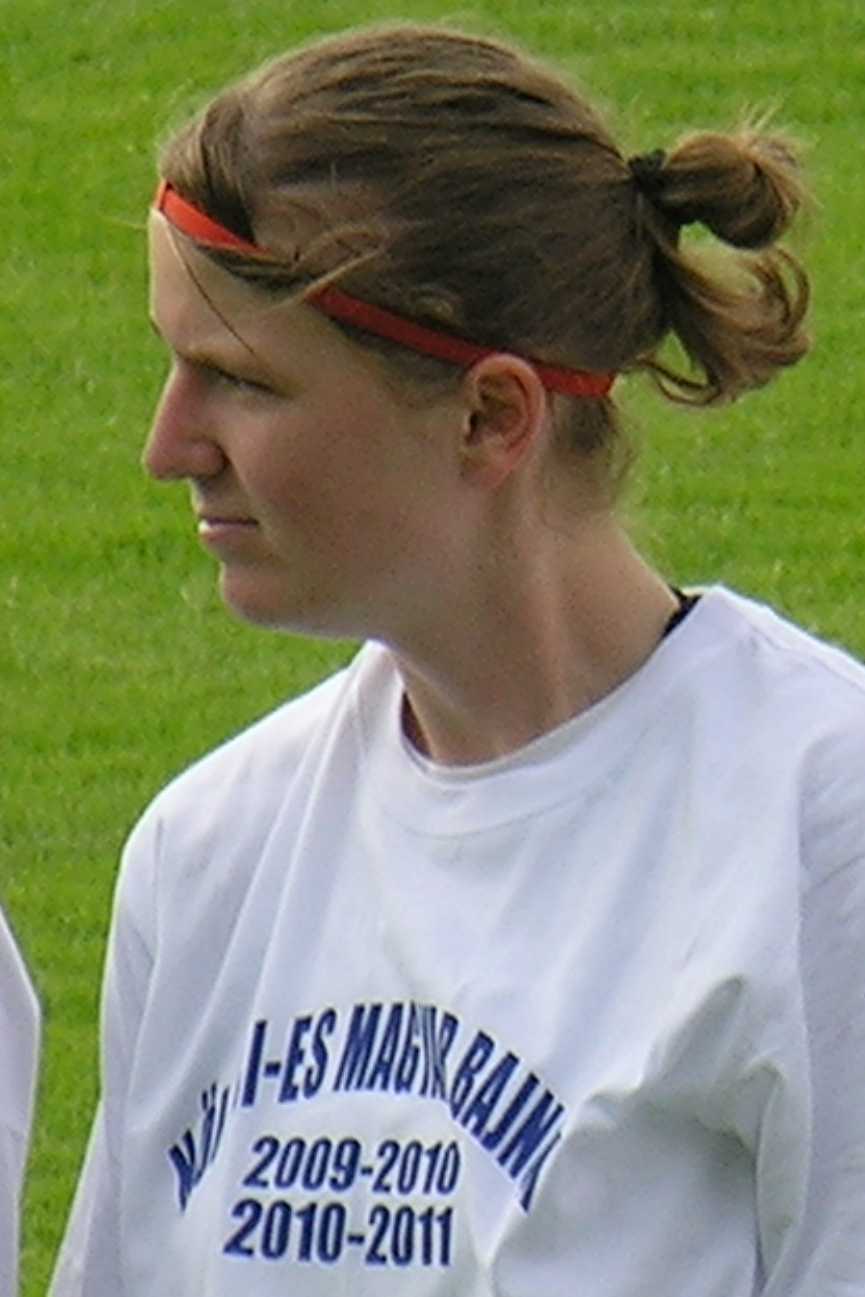

Personal information
- Full name: Mercédesz Vesszős
- Date of birth: 10 January 1992 (age 34)
- Place of birth: Hungary
- Position: Defender

Senior career*
Years	Team	Apps	(Gls)
2006–2011	MTK	91	(2)
2011	AS Volos 2004		
2012	?		
2012–	MTK		

International career^{‡}
2013–	Hungary	3	(0)
- * Club domestic league appearances and goals ‡ National team caps and goals as of 11 March 2013

Mercédesz Vesszős (born 10 January 1992) is a Hungarian football defender currently playing in the Hungarian First Division for MTK Hungária, with whom she has also played the Champions League. She is a member of the Hungarian national team.
