= Cecilie Breil Kramer =

Danish footballer (born 1987)

Cecilie Kramer
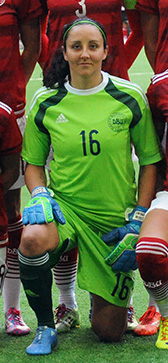

Personal information
- Full name: Cecilie Breil Kramer
- Date of birth: 25 March 1987 (age 39)
- Place of birth: Denmark
- Position: Goalkeeper

Youth career
- 1994–2001: Måløv BK

Senior career*
Years	Team	Apps	(Gls)
2001–2009	Skovlunde IF		
2009–2011	BK Skjold		
2011–2014	B93/HIK/Skjold		
2014	Brøndby IF		
2015	Vittsjö GIK	15	(0)

International career
2003–2004	Denmark U17	7	(0)
2004–2006	Denmark U19	19	(0)
2012–2016	Denmark	11	(0)
- * Club domestic league appearances and goals as of 00:59, 31 January 2016 (UTC)

Cecilie Breil Kramer (née Sørensen; born 25 March 1987) is a Danish football goalkeeper. She played for Vittsjö GIK of the Damallsvenskan and the Denmark national team.

== Club career ==
In 2014, B.93/HIK/Skjold went into meltdown when the entire squad quit en masse in protest at the club's feckless leadership. Breil Kramer soon pitched up at Brøndby IF.

== International career ==
She was called up to be part of the national team for the UEFA European Championship 2013.

== Personal life ==
In the summer of 2014, Breil Kramer married Maria in Solrød. She was wearing a plaster cast with her wedding dress.

== Honours ==
=== Club ===
BK Skjold

Winner

- Kvinde 1. division: 2011–12

Runner-up

- Danish Women's Cup: 2011–12
