= Neide Simões =

Portuguese footballer

Personal information
- Full name: Neide Marina Fidalgo Alves Mateus Simões
- Date of birth: 19 July 1988 (age 38)
- Place of birth: Viseu, Portugal
- Height: 1.75 m (5 ft 9 in)
- Position: Goalkeeper

Team information
- Current team: Valadares Gaia

Youth career
- 2002–?: Escola

Senior career*
Years	Team	Apps	(Gls)
?–2012	Escola	?	(?)
2012–2013	SC 07 Bad Neuenahr	8	(0)
2013–2014	1. FC Köln	?	(?)
2014–	Valadares Gaia	?	(?)

International career^{‡}
2005–2007	Portugal U-19	17	(0)
2007–2017	Portugal	60	(0)
- * Club domestic league appearances and goals as of 19:27, 12 February 2021 (UTC) ‡ National team caps and goals as of 11:49, 13 February 2021 (UTC)

Neide Marina Fidalgo Alves Mateus Simões (born 19 July 1988) is a Portuguese footballer, who plays for Valadares Gaia and played 60 times for the Portugal women's national football team between 2007 and 2017. Simões plays as a goalkeeper.

== Club career ==
Simões played for 10 years at Portuguese Campeonato Nacional Feminino club Escola, before transferring to German Frauen-Bundesliga team SC 07 Bad Neuenahr in July 2012. Simões had been scouted by SC 07 whilst playing in the 2012 Algarve Cup, and signed a one-year contract. Simões later played for 1. FC Köln, before returning to Portugal to play for Campeonato Nacional Feminino club Valadares Gaia F.C. In total, she spent two years in Germany.

In 2019, Simões helped Valadares to beat Clube de Albergaria in a penalty shoot-out to progress to the Portuguese Women's Cup Final. There, Valadares played against Benfica. They lost the match 4–0, and Simões went off injured after 86 minutes, and had to be replaced in goal by an outfield player. In March 2020, Simões was nominated for the best player award at the Gala Quinas de Ouro.

== International career ==
Simões made 17 appearances for Portugal under-19s between 2005 and 2007. She made her international debut for Portugal women's national football team in 2007, and has made 60 appearances for the senior team. She played in the Algarve Cup in 2012, 2014, 2015, and 2016.

== Personal life ==
Simões is from Viseu, Portugal. Aside from football, she has worked as a CrossFit trainer.
