= Mariane Amaro =

Portuguese football defender (born 1993)

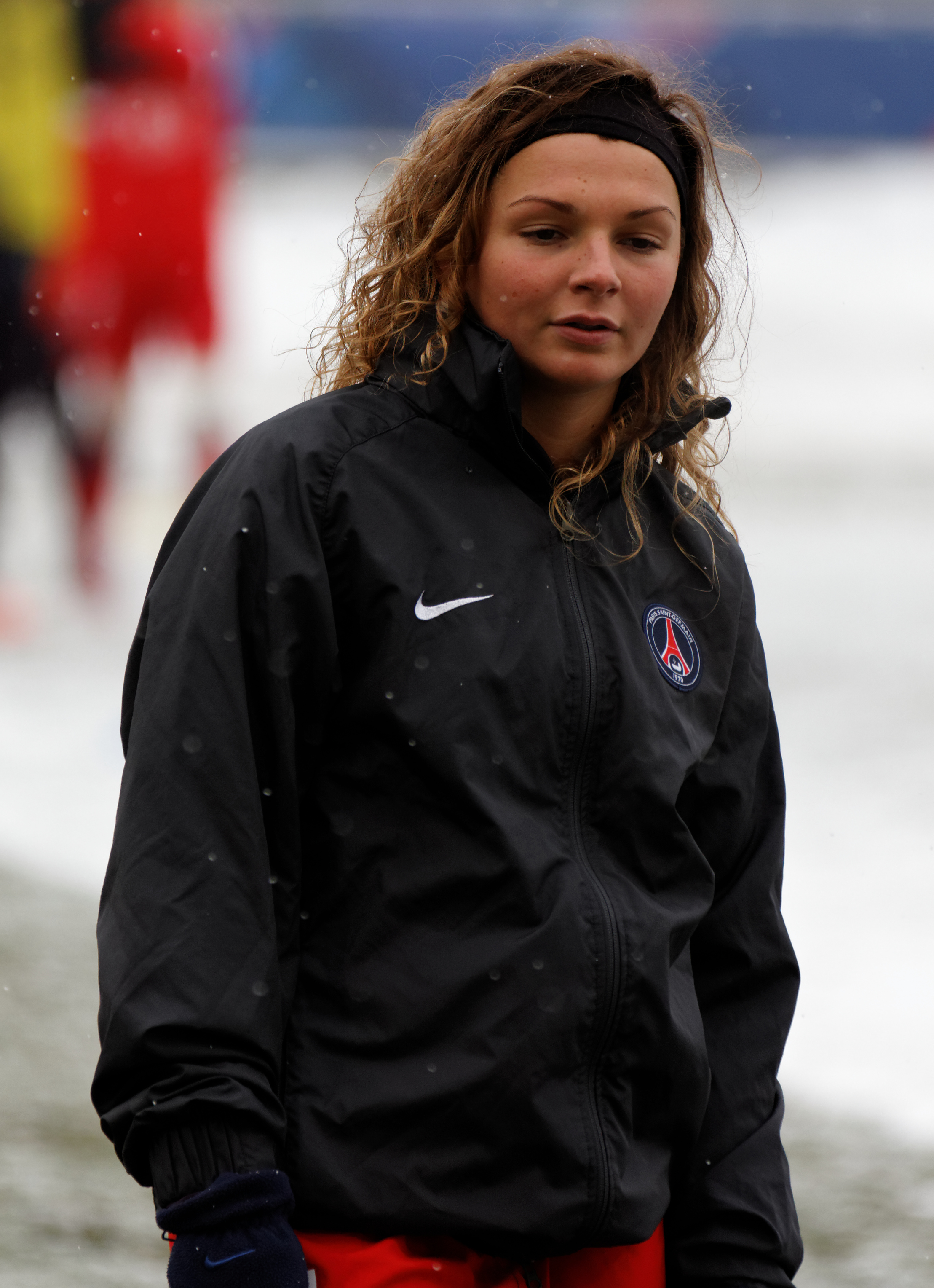

Personal information
- Full name: Mariane Goux Amaro
- Date of birth: 17 September 1993 (age 33)
- Place of birth: Montmorency, France
- Height: 1.60 m (5 ft 3 in)
- Position: Right back

Team information
- Current team: VGA Saint-Maur

Youth career
- 2007–2009: FC Domont
- 2010–2011: Paris Saint-Germain

Senior career*
Years	Team	Apps	(Gls)
2011–2013	Paris Saint-Germain	5	(0)
2013–	VGA Saint-Maur	38	(0)

International career^{‡}
2012–	Portugal	12	(0)
- * Club domestic league appearances and goals as of 16 September 2016 (UTC) ‡ National team caps and goals as of 1 May 2013

Mariane Goux Amaro (born 17 September 1993) is a Portuguese football defender currently playing for VGA Saint-Maur in the French First Division. Born in France, she is a member of the Portuguese national team.
