= Ólína Guðbjörg Viðarsdóttir =

Icelandic footballer

Ólína G. Viðarsdóttir
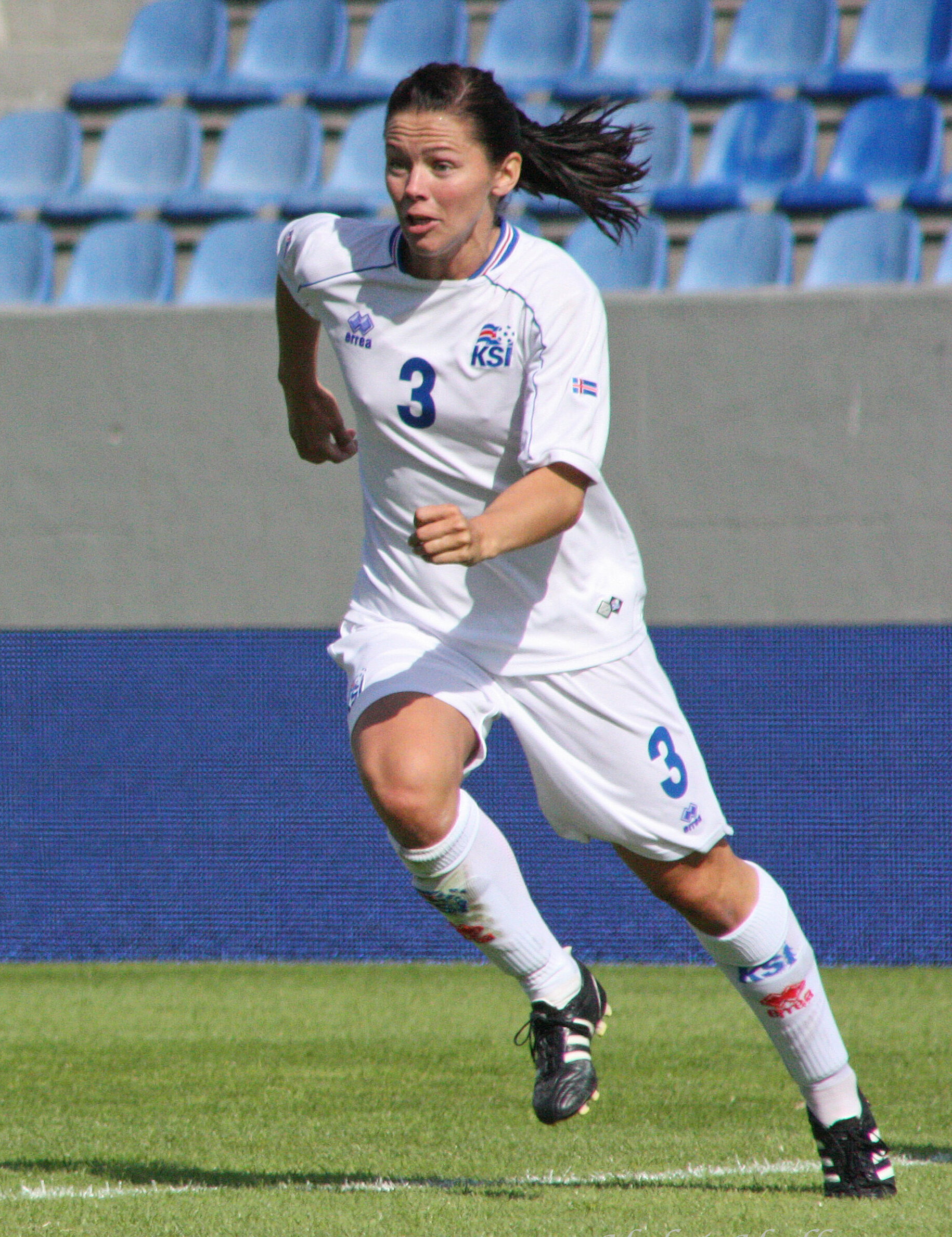
- Ólína playing for Iceland in 2009

Personal information
- Full name: Ólína Guðbjörg Viðarsdóttir
- Date of birth: 16 November 1982 (age 43)
- Place of birth: Grindavík, Iceland
- Height: 1.67 m (5 ft 6 in)
- Position: Defender

Youth career
- 2001–2002: Central Michigan Chippewas
- 2003–2004: Richmond Spiders

Senior career*
Years	Team	Apps	(Gls)
1997–2001	Grindavík	18	(3)
2002–2006	Breiðablik	56	(21)
2007–2008	KR	31	(6)
2009–2012	KIF Örebro DFF	53	(2)
2013	Chelsea Ladies	7	(0)
2013–2014	Valur	24	(6)
2015	Fylkir	18	(2)
2017	KR	4	(0)

International career^{‡}
1999	Iceland U–17	4	(0)
2002–2006	Iceland U–21	17	(0)
2003–2014	Iceland	70	(2)
- * Club domestic league appearances and goals as of 3 July 2015 ‡ National team caps and goals as of 20:57, 17 July 2013 (UTC)

Ólína Guðbjörg Viðarsdóttir (born 16 November 1982) is an Icelandic football defender and a former member of the Icelandic national football team.

== Club career ==
From 2009 until 2012, Ólína played club football in Sweden for KIF Örebro DFF. She joined Chelsea Ladies of the English FA WSL in January 2013. She returned to Iceland at the start of July and signed for Valur. In November 2014 she signed for Fylkir.

In November 2016, Ólína signed with KR. She missed the majority of the 2017 Úrvalsdeild season due to a concussion she received in the second game of the season.

== National team career ==
Ólína was part of Iceland's national team and competed in the UEFA Women's Championships in 2009 and 2013. She retired from international football in 2014.

== Personal life ==
In June 2012, Ólína and partner Edda Garðarsdóttir had their first child when she (Ólína) gave birth to a daughter.

== Achievements ==
- Two times Icelandic champion
- Three times Icelandic cup winner
