= 2011–12 Serie A (women) =

Serie A
- Season: 2011–12
- Champions: Torres (6th title)
- Relegated: Venezia 1984; Milan; Roma
- UEFA Women's Champions League: Torres; Bardolino Verona
- Matches: 142
- Goals: 577 (4.06 per match)
- Top goalscorer: Patrizia Panico (29)
- Biggest home win: Torres 11–0 Lazio
- Biggest away win: Firenze 1–6 Torres; Lazio 1–6 Mozzanica; Venezia 1984 1–6 Mozzanica; Roma 1–6 Tavagnacco; Mozzanica 0–5 Torres; Roma 0–5 Bardolino Verona
- Highest scoring: Torres 11–0 Lazio

The 2011–12 Serie A di calcio femminile was the 45th edition of the premier category of the Italian women's football championship. It ran from 8 October 2011 to 26 May 2012 and it was contested by fourteen teams, with FCF Como 2000, ACF Milan and ASD Riviera di Romagna joining the competition. ASD Torres Calcio won its third title in a row and a record overall sixth with a two points advantage over ASDCF Bardolino, which also qualified for the 2012-13 UEFA Champions League. Previous season's runner-up UPC Tavagnacco and Brescia followed in the table at two and four points from Champions League qualification.

ACF Venezia 1984, Milan and GS Roma CF were relegated. This season marked the introduction of a new relegation system involving the five bottom teams. The lowest team would be relegated while the other four ones would play a relegation play-off. However, in case there was a 9 points or higher difference between the second and fourth to last teams their play-off would be cancelled with the lower-ranked team being relegated. At the end of the season there was a 12 points between 10th-ranked Riviera di Romagna and 13th Milan, so the former were spared while Milan was relegated. 12th-placed Venezia defeated 11th SS Lazio CF in the other play-off, sending 5-times champion Lazio to Serie A2. However, in August Venezia renounced to its spot in the category, and it was relegated instead of Lazio.

== Teams by region ==
Region	Teams
(Lombardy) Lombardia	4: Brescia, Como 2000, Milan, Mozzanica
Friuli-Venezia Giulia	2: Chiasiellis, Tavagnacco
Lazio	2: Lazio, Roma
Veneto	2: Bardolino Verona, Venezia 1984
Emilia-Romagna	1: Riviera di Romagna
(Piedmont) Piemonte	1: Torino
Sardinia	1: Torres
(Tuscany) Toscana	1: Firenze

== League table ==
Pos	Team	Pld	W	D	L	GF	GA	GD	Pts	Qualification or relegation
1	Torres (C, Q)	26	21	3	2	83	11	+72	66	Qualification to Champions League
2	Bardolino Verona (Q)	26	21	1	4	66	21	+45	64	Qualification to Champions League
3	Tavagnacco	26	19	5	2	78	20	+58	62	
4	Brescia	26	18	4	4	69	27	+42	58	
5	Mozzanica	26	12	7	7	44	38	+6	43	
6	Torino	26	13	1	12	42	43	−1	40	
7	Chiasiellis	26	9	8	9	40	43	−3	35	
8	Como 2000	26	7	8	11	26	40	−14	29	
9	Firenze	26	7	5	14	30	47	−17	26	
10	Riviera di Romagna	26	6	6	14	17	45	−28	24	
11	Lazio	26	7	1	18	20	60	−40	22	Relegation play-offs
12	Venezia 1984 (O, R)	26	4	8	14	27	52	−25	20	Relegation play-offs
13	Milan (R)	26	2	6	18	15	60	−45	12	Relegation to Serie A2
14	Roma (R)	26	0	9	17	20	70	−50	9	Relegation to Serie A2

Source: CalcioDonne (in Italian)
Rules for classification: 1) points; 2) number of wins; 3) goal difference; 4) number of goals scored
(C) Champions; (O) Play-off winners; (Q) Qualified for the phase indicated; (R) Relegated

=== Relegation play-off ===
May 26, 2012
15:45 (CEST)

Lazio	0 – 1	Venezia 1984
		Tombola 19'

La Borghesiana, Rome
Referee: Di Gioia

== Results ==
Home \ Away	BAR	BRE	CHI	COM	FIR	LAZ	MIL	MOZ	RIV	ROM	TAV	TRN	TOR	VEN
Bardolino		4–0	2–1	2–1	4–0	3–1	0–1	3–0	5–0	8–1	4–3	0–4	3–0	1–1
Brescia	2–0		2–1	6–1	2–0	8–0	1–0	3–1	6–0	2–0	0–2	1–4	4–3	1–1
Chiasiellis	1–3	0–3		1–1	1–1	3–1	2–0	1–3	1–0	2–2	2–0	0–3	2–1	2–2
Como 2000	0–4	1–1	0–0		0–0	2–0	2–0	0–1	1–0	1–1	2–2	0–3	1–2	3–1
Firenze	0–3	0–3	3–1	0–2		0–1	3–0	1–1	1–2	5–0	0–2	1–6	0–4	0–1
Lazio	1–2	1–3	2–3	1–0	0–1		2–1	1–6	1–0	0–0	0–1	0–3	0–1	2–1
Milan	0–3	0–4	1–4	0–4	1–4	2–0		1–1	0–1	1–1	1–4	0–2	0–3	1–2
Mozzanica	1–2	2–2	2–0	3–0	3–1	1–0	0–0		2–2	2–1	1–5	0–5	1–0	2–1
Riviera di Romagna	0–1	0–4	0–3	0–0	1–1	1–0	2–2	0–2		3–0	1–1	0–2	0–2	1–0
Roma	0–5	0–1	2–2	1–2	0–2	1–2	2–2	1–1	0–0		1–6	1–4	0–2	1–2
Tavagnacco	3–1	1–1	5–0	5–1	3–0	4–0	2–0	4–0	4–0	6–1		2–0	5–1	5–2
Torres	0–1	4–1	1–1	3–0	2–0	11–0	8–0	2–2	3–0	3–1	0–0		3–0	1–0
Torino	0–1	0–3	0–3	2–0	4–4	2–1	2–0	1–0	3–2	5–1	0–2	0–3		2–1
Venezia 1984	0–1	1–5	3–3	1–1	0–2	0–3	1–1	1–6	0–1	1–1	1–1	0–3	3–2	

Legend: Blue = home team win; Yellow = draw; Red = away team win.

== Top scorers ==
Rank	Player	Team	Goals
1	(Italy) Patrizia Panico	Torres	29
2	(Brazil) Dayane	Bardolino	24
3	(Italy) Daniela Sabatino	Brescia	22
4	(Italy) Melania Gabbiadini	Bardolino	17
5	(Italy) Paola Brumana	Tavagnacco	16
6	(Italy) Simona Sodini	Torino	15
7	(Italy) Valentina Boni	Brescia	14
+	(Italy) Silvia Fuselli	Torres	14
9	(Italy) Penelope Riboldi	Tavagnacco	13
+	(Italy) Sandy Iannella	Torres	13
