= 2014–15 Serie A (women) =

Serie A
- Season: 2014–15
- Champions: Verona
- Relegated: Riviera di Romagna; Cuneo; Como 2000; Pink Sport Time; Pordenone; Orobica
- UEFA Women's Champions League: Verona; Brescia
- Matches: 182
- Goals: 644 (3.54 per match)
- Top goalscorer: Patrizia Panico (34)
- Biggest home win: Tavagnacco 10–0 Orobica
- Biggest away win: Cuneo 1–11 Verona
- Highest scoring: Cuneo 1–11 Verona

The 2014–15 Serie A di calcio femminile was the 48th edition of the premier category of the Italian women's football championship. It ran from 4 October 2014 to 16 May 2015 and it was contested by fourteen teams. Verona won its fifth title, first since 2008-09. They finished the season one point ahead of Brescia. Both teams qualified for the 2015–16 UEFA Women's Champions League.

== League table ==
Pos	Team	Pld	W	D	L	GF	GA	GD	Pts	Qualification or relegation
1	Verona (C, Q)	26	21	4	1	110	22	+88	67	Qualification to Champions League
2	Brescia (Q)	26	21	3	2	91	21	+70	66	Qualification to Champions League
3	Mozzanica	26	18	2	6	60	19	+41	56	
4	Firenze	26	14	6	6	45	36	+9	48	
5	Tavagnacco	26	14	5	7	58	33	+25	47	
6	Torres	26	13	6	7	60	35	+25	45	
7	Res Roma (Note: Res Roma stays in Serie A without playoff due to finishing nine points better than 10th place Cuneo.)	26	10	8	8	31	23	+8	38	Relegation play-offs
8	Riviera di Romagna (R)	26	11	2	13	40	44	−4	35	Relegation play-offs
9	San Zaccaria	26	7	7	12	39	49	−10	28	Relegation play-offs
10	Cuneo (Note: Cuneo relegated to Serie B without playoff due to finishing nine points worse than 7th place Res Roma.) (R)	26	8	0	18	31	72	−41	24	Relegation play-offs
11	Como (R)	26	5	7	14	25	71	−46	22	Relegation to Serie B
12	Pink Sport Time (R)	26	4	3	19	21	61	−40	15	Relegation to Serie B
13	Pordenone (R)	26	3	6	17	17	66	−49	15	Relegation to Serie B
14	Orobica (R)	26	1	5	20	16	92	−76	8	Relegation to Serie B

Source: CalcioDonne (in Italian)
Rules for classification: 1) points; 2) number of wins; 3) goal difference; 4) number of goals scored
(C) Champions; (Q) Qualified for the phase indicated; (R) Relegated

=== Relegation play-off ===
May 16, 2015

Riviera di Romagna	1 - 2	San Zaccaria
Caccamo 41'	Report	Barbieri 48'; Galletti 61'

Stadio Germano Todoli
Attendance: 500

== Results ==
Home \ Away	AVE	BRF	COM	CCF	FIR	GPO	MOZ	ORO	PST	RES	RDR	USZ	TAV	TCF
AGSM Verona		1–0	6–0	6–0	2–2	7–0	1–0	5–0	7–1	1–1	2–1	6–1	5–2	3–1
Brescia Femminile	4–2		7–2	2–0	6–0	6–0	2–1	1–1	8–0	2–0	3–1	2–2	4–1	1–1
Como 2000	0–7	1–7		1–5	0–2	1–1	0–6	2–2	2–1	0–0	1–2	2–3	0–3	1–1
A.S.D. Cuneo Calcio Femminile	1–11	0–3	0–1		1–4	2–3	1–3	3–1	1–0	2–1	1–3	2–1	1–6	1–6
Firenze	1–1	1–5	0–1	3–1		2–1	3–2	7–2	2–1	1–0	1–1	2–1	1–1	1–1
ACFD Pordenone	0–7	0–6	0–0	0–2	0–2		0–2	0–0	1–0	0–0	1–1	1–3	0–2	2–2
Mozzanica	2–2	0–1	4–0	4–1	1–0	4–0		2–0	3–0	2–0	2–0	2–0	3–1	4–2
Orobica	1–10	2–6	0–4	0–2	1–2	0–1	0–7		1–1	0–1	0–3	1–3	0–1	0–2
Pink Sport Time	1–3	0–3	1–2	2–1	1–2	1–0	0–0	2–3		1–0	4–1	0–0	2–3	1–2
Res Roma														
Riviera di Romagna														
San Zaccaria														
Tavagnacco														
Torres														

Updated to match(es) played on unknown. Source: Serie A
Legend: Blue = home team win; Yellow = draw; Red = away team win.

== Top goalscorers ==
As of matches played on 9 May 2015.

Rank	Player	Club	Goals
1	(Italy) Patrizia Panico	Verona	34
2	(Italy) Cristiana Girelli	Brescia	28
3	(Italy) Paola Brumana	Tavagnacco	22
4	(Italy) Daniela Sabatino	Brescia	21
4	(Italy) Valentina Giacinti	Mozzanica	21
6	(Italy) Tatiana Bonetti	Verona	19
7	(Italy) Melania Gabbiadini	Verona	18
8	(Hungary) Lilla Sipos	Verona	15
9	(Italy) Stefania Tarenzi	Brescia	14
9	(Italy) Sandy Iannella	Mozzanica	14
