= List of Fiorentina Women's FC seasons =

This is a list of seasons of Italian women's football team Fiorentina Women's FC, formerly known as ACF Firenze, which has been ACF Fiorentina's women's section since the 2015–16 season.

== Summary ==
Champions	Runners-up	Promoted	Relegated

Domestic and international results of Polisportiva Firenze
Season	League										Cup	SC	Europe	League top scorer	
Season	Division	Tier	Pos	P	W	D	L	F	A	Pts	Cup	SC	Europe	Name(s)	Goals
1980	Serie B – Group Lombardia	3	1												
1981	Serie B – Group C	2	6	12	2	2	7	13	17	6					
1982	Serie B – Group C	2	4	12	4	3	5	10	13	11					
1983	Serie B – Group B	2	2	16	11	3	2	37	10	25					
1984	Serie A	1	11	24	4	3	15	34	44	11					
1985	Serie A	1	9	24	7	5	12	16	31	19					

Domestic and international results of ACF Firenze
Season	League										Cup	SC	Europe	League top scorer	
Season	Division	Tier	Pos	P	W	D	L	F	A	Pts	Cup	SC	Europe	Name(s)	Goals
1985–86	Serie A	1	10	30	6	9	11	20	35	21					
1986–87	Serie A	1	14	30	7	7	16	29	52	21					
1987–88	Serie B – Group B	2	1	16	13	2	1	35	8	28					
1988–89	Serie A	1	7	28	12	5	11	36	42	29					
1989–90	Serie A	1	9	30	11	8	11	44	43	30					
1990–91	Serie A	1	6	28	13	6	9	50	30	32					
1991–92	Serie A	1	5	30	15	7	8	39	30	37					
1992–93	Serie A	1	4	30	12	12	6	49	38	36					
1993–94	Serie C – Group Toscana	3	?												
1994–95	Serie C – Group Toscana	3	1												
1995–96	Serie C – Group Toscana	3	1												
1996–97	Serie B – Group A	2	8	22	7	5	10	30	36	26					
1997–98	Serie B – Group A	2	13	30	9	6	15	35	52	33					
1998–99	Serie C – Group Toscana	3	3												
1999–00	Serie C – Group Toscana	3	4												
2000–01	Serie C – Group Toscana	3	3												
2001–02	Serie B – Group C	3	6	26	12	7	7	55	42	43					
2002–03	Serie B – Group C	3	2	22	18	1	3	89	24	55					
2003–04	Serie A2 – Group A	2	6	22	10	7	5	46	28	37	R2				
2004–05	Serie A2 – Group B	2	2	22	15	3	4	52	23	48	R1				
2005–06	Serie A2 – Group B	2	1	22	17	4	1	56	14	55	R1				
2006–07	Serie A	1	11	22	6	6	10	28	35	24	R1			(Italy) Francesca Baglieri	6
2007–08	Serie A	1	12	22	4	3	15	21	46	15	R1			(Italy) Alia Guagni	6
2008–09	Serie A2 – Group B	2	2	22	15	5	2	72	18	50	R1			(Italy) Alia Guagni	27
2009–10	Serie A2 – Group B	2	2	20	13	4	3	46	15	43	QF			(Italy) Alia Guagni	16
2010–11	Serie A	1	11	26	6	5	15	25	66	23	SF			(Italy) Alia Guagni	8
2011–12	Serie A	1	9	26	7	5	14	30	46	26	QF			(Italy) Alia Guagni	12
2012–13	Serie A	1	8	30	11	8	11	43	44	41	R16			(Italy) Alia Guagni	18
2013–14	Serie A	1	8	30	11	4	15	46	54	37	QF			(Italy) Arianna Ferrati	10
2014–15	Serie A	1	4	26	14	6	6	45	36	48	R16			(Italy) Salvatori-Rinaldi & Vicchiarello	9

Domestic and international results of Fiorentina Women's FC
Season	League										Cup	SC	Europe	League top scorer	
Season	Division	Tier	Pos	P	W	D	L	F	A	Pts	Cup	SC	Europe	Name(s)	Goals
2015–16	Serie A	1	3	22	15	4	3	68	28	49	R32			(Italy) Patrizia Panico	20
2016–17	Serie A	1	1	22	21	0	1	88	7	67	W			(Italy) Tatiana Bonetti	21
