= 2008–09 Italian Women's Cup =

The 2008–09 Coppa Italia di calcio femminile was the 37th edition of the Italian women's football national cup. ASDCF Bardolino defeated defending champion Torres CF in a rematch of the previous edition's final to win its third title.

== First stage ==
=== Group A ===
#	Team	Pld	W	D	L	GF	GA	Pt
1	Torres	6	6	0	0	44	0	18
2	Atletico Oristano	6	2	2	2	23	16	8
3	Olbia	6	1	1	4	19	24	4
4	Caprera	6	1	1	4	8	54	4

	TOR	ATO	OLB	CAP
Torres		8–0	6–0	13–0
Atletico Oristano	0–3		3–0	15–0
Olbia	0–8	2–2		14–0
Caprera	0–6	3–3	5–3	

=== Group B ===
#	Team	Pld	W	D	L	GF	GA	Pt
1	Orlandia	4	4	0	0	16	3	12
2	Acese	4	3	0	1	11	6	9
3	Ludos Palermo	4	1	1	2	6	8	4
4	Aquile Palermo	4	1	1	2	2	11	4
5	Ginnic Stadium	4	0	0	4	6	13	0

	ORL	ACE	LUD	AQU	GIN
Orlandia		1–0	4–2	6–0	5–1
Acese			2–1	5–1	4–3
Ludos Palermo				0–0	3–2
Aquile Palermo					1–0
Ginnic Stadium					

=== Group C ===
#	Team	Pld	W	D	L	GF	GA	Pt
1	Roma	4	3	1	0	13	4	10
2	Lazio	4	2	2	0	7	0	8
3	Napoli	4	2	0	2	10	11	6
4	Francavilla Fontana	4	0	2	2	1	5	2
5	Bari	4	0	1	3	3	14	1

	ROM	LAZ	NAP	FRA	BAR
Roma		0–0	4–3	2–0	7–1
Lazio			4–0	0–0	3–0
Napoli				3–1	4–2
Francavilla Fontana					0–0
Bari					

=== Group D ===
#	Team	Pld	W	D	L	GF	GA	Pt
1	Grifo Perugia	6	2	2	2	10	11	8
2	Firenze	6	2	2	2	8	7	8
3	Pisa	6	2	2	2	5	5	8
4	Jesina	6	1	4	1	9	9	7

	GRI	FIR	PIS	JES
Grifo Perugia		3–2	1–0	1–1
Firenze	1–0		3–0	1–1
Pisa	?–?	0–2		0–0
Jesina	6–4	?–?	0–2	

=== Group E ===
#	Team	Pld	W	D	L	GF	GA	Pt
1	Reggiana	4	3	1	0	18	3	10
2	Fiammamonza	4	3	1	0	17	4	10
3	Cervia	4	2	0	2	7	8	6
4	Dinamo Ravenna	4	1	0	3	3	15	3
5	Montale	4	0	0	4	1	16	0

	REG	FIA	CER	DIN	MON
Reggiana		1–1	5–2	6–0	6–0
Fiammamonza			3–2	7–1	6–0
Cervia				1–0	2–0
Dinamo Ravenna					2–1
Montale					

=== Group F ===
#	Team	Pld	W	D	L	GF	GA	Pt
1	Chiasiellis	4	3	1	0	14	3	10
2	Tavagnacco	4	3	0	1	18	7	9
3	Venezia	4	2	0	2	16	9	6
4	Gordige	4	1	0	3	5	25	3
5	Fortitudo Mozzecane	4	0	1	3	6	15	1

	CHI	TAV	VEN	GOR	FOR
Chiasiellis		2–0	3–1	7–0	2–2
Tavagnacco			4–2	8–1	6–2
Venezia				9–1	4–1
Gordige					3–1
Fortitudo Mozzecane					

=== Group G ===
#	Team	Pld	W	D	L	GF	GA	Pt
1	Bardolino	4	4	0	0	29	1	12
2	Atalanta	4	3	0	1	16	9	9
3	Brescia	4	2	0	2	6	12	6
4	Mozzanica	4	1	0	3	9	11	3
5	Trento	4	0	0	4	6	33	0

	BAR	ATA	BRE	MOZ	TRE
Bardolino		5–0	5–0	7–1	12–0
Atalanta			5–1	2–0	9–3
Brescia				1–0	4–2
Mozzanica					8–1
Trento					

=== Group H ===
#	Team	Pld	W	D	L	GF	GA	Pt
1	Torino	5	4	1	0	16	6	13
2	Como	5	3	2	0	7	3	11
3	Entella Chiavari	5	3	1	1	11	8	10
4	Milan	5	2	0	3	5	4	6
5	Riozzese	5	1	0	4	4	10	3
6	Tradate Abbiate	5	0	0	5	3	15	0

	TOR	COM	ENT	MIL	RIO	TRA
Torino		2–2	6–2	2–1	1–0	5–1
Como			0–0	1–0	2–1	2–0
Entella Chiavari				1–0	3–1	5–1
Milan					3–0	1–0
Riozzese						2–1
Tradate Abbiate						

== Quarterfinals ==
Team 1	Agg.	Team 2	1st leg	2nd leg
Bardolino	11–1	Torino	8–1	3–0
Reggiana	5–1	Chiasiellis	2–0	3–1
Torres	6–1	Grifo Perugia	4–0	2–1
Orlandia	2–1	Roma	2–1	0–0

== Final four ==
=== Semifinals ===
June 12, 2009
20:30

Bardolino	4 – 0	Reggiana
Girelli 9'; D'Adda 35'; Panico 57', 89'

Flaminio, Rome
Attendance: 300
Referee: Cocciolo
June 12, 2009
20:30

Torres	5 – 1	Orlandia
Tona 45+2', 69'; Fuselli 49'; Domenichetti 61', 85'		Manieri 35' (o.g.)

Domenico Fiore, Marino
Attendance: 300
Referee: Diomaiuta

=== Final ===
June 13, 2009

Bardolino	2 – 0	Torres
Motta 27'; Gabbiadini 86'

Domenico Fiore, Marino
Attendance: 500

2009 Women's Football Italian Cup Winners
ASDCF Bardolino
3rd Title
