= Sandy Iannella =

Italian footballer (born 1987)

Personal information
- Full name: Sandy Iannella
- Date of birth: 6 April 1987 (age 39)
- Place of birth: Livorno, Italy
- Height: 1.64 m (5 ft 5 in)
- Position: Striker

Team information
- Current team: Sassuolo

Senior career*
Years	Team	Apps	(Gls)
2004–2006	Livorno	44	(48)
2006–2014	Torres	104	(70)
2014–2016	Mozzanica	43	(21)
2016–2017	Cuneo	22	(9)
2017–	Sassuolo	24	(6)

International career^{‡}
	Italy	6	(0)
- * Club domestic league appearances and goals ‡ National team caps and goals as of 18:45, 14 February 2021 (UTC)

Sandy Iannella (born 6 April 1987) is an Italian footballer who plays as a striker for Sassuolo. She previously played for third-tier Livorno and Serie A club Torres.

== Career ==
Iannella was released by Cuneo after the club sold their Serie A license to Juventus. She was signed by Sassuolo on 7 August.

== International career ==
She was an under-19 international and has represented the senior squad.

Iannella was called up to the Italy squad for the UEFA Women's Euro 2017.

== Honours ==
Torres Calcio Femminile

- Serie A 2009–10, 2010–11, 2011–12, 2012–13
- Coppa Italia, 2007–08, 2010–11
- Supercoppa Italiana, 2009, 2010, 2011, 2012, 2013
- Italy Women's Cup, 2008
