= Elisa Bartoli =

Italian footballer (born 1991)

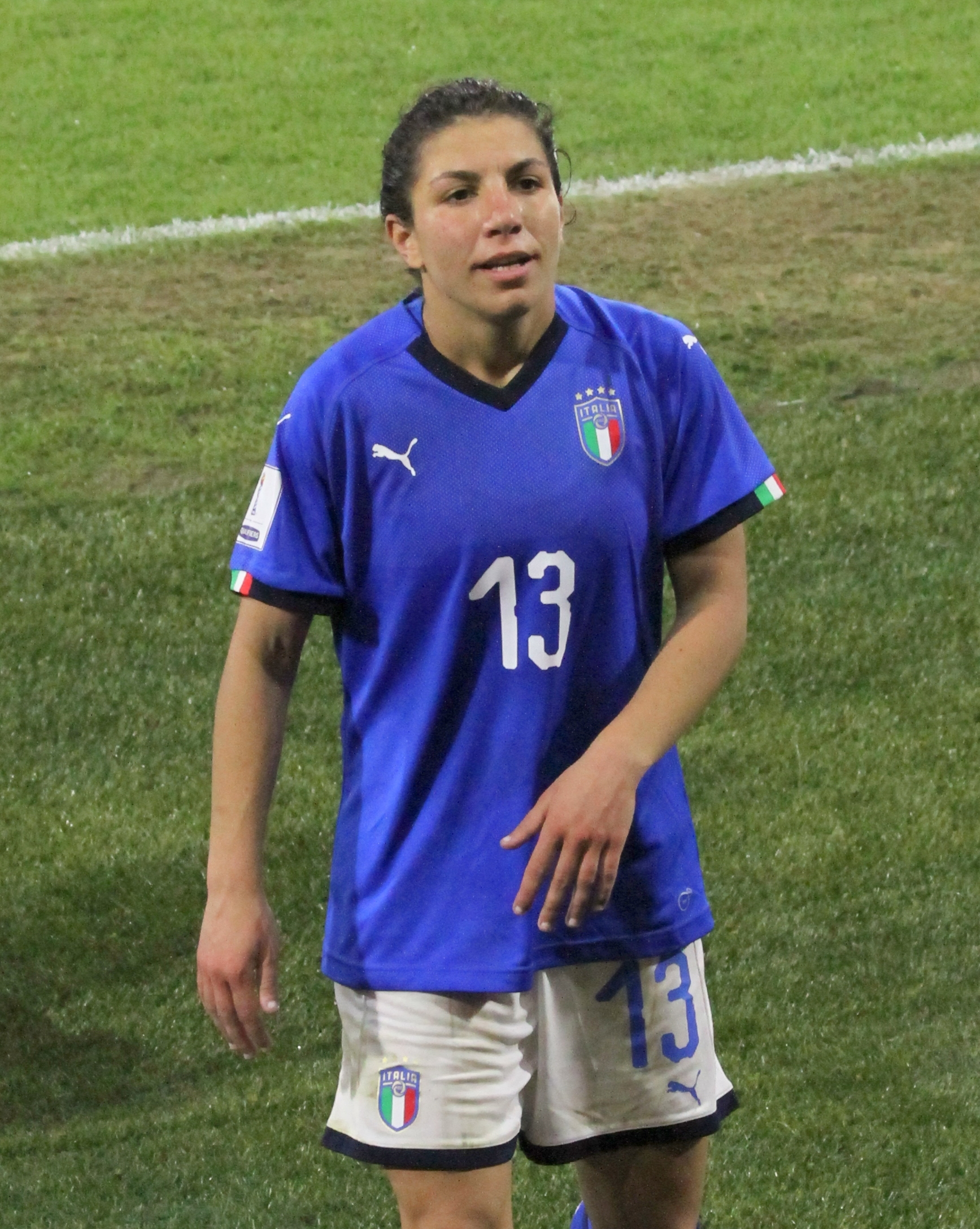
- Bartoli representing Italy in April 2018

Personal information
- Date of birth: 7 May 1991 (age 35)
- Place of birth: Rome, Italy
- Height: 1.60 m (5 ft 3 in)
- Position: Right back

Team information
- Current team: Inter Milan
- Number: 33

Senior career*
Years	Team	Apps	(Gls)
2006–2012	Roma CF	100	(5)
2012–2015	ASD Torres Calcio	67	(7)
2015–2016	ASD Mozzanica	16	(2)
2016–2018	Fiorentina	39	(2)
2018–2024	Roma	104	(14)
2024-	Inter Milan	6	(0)

International career^{‡}
2007	Italy U-17	3	(0)
2009–2010	Italy U-19	17	(2)
2013–	Italy	93	(3)
- * Club domestic league appearances and goals as of 11 September 2024 ‡ National team caps and goals as of 15:56, 23 March 2023 (UTC)

Elisa Bartoli (born 7 May 1991) is an Italian professional footballer who plays as a right back for Serie A club Inter Milan and the Italy women's national team.

== Club career ==
Bartoli played for Roma Calcio Femminile, beginning her senior career in 2006 and playing with her hometown club for six seasons. During that time, Bartoli was part of Roma CF's promotion from Serie B to Serie A within her first three seasons at the club. Bartoli decided to move from her native Rome in the summer of 2012, joining ASD Torres Calcio in for the 2012-2013 season.

Bartoli won a Serie A league title and two Supercoppa trophies during her time with Torres, but was faced with the club missing the deadline to register themselves for Serie A competition in the summer of 2015. Bartoli then chose to sign with ASD Mozzanica, but would later claim that the move up to Northern Italy wasn't to her liking. Bartoli earned the nickname "Gladiator" with Mozzanica, but cut short her stay with the Bergamo-based club to join Fiorentina a year later.

At Fiorentina, Bartoli enjoyed more success with a league title win and Coppa Italia victories. Having established herself as a household name in Serie A and an international defender with Italy, Bartoli took the decision to return to her native Rome in the summer of 2018. Bartoli joined the newly-formed A.S. Roma Women. Her decision meant she became the club's first captain in their history, while Roma set themselves a club target of winning silverware within their first four seasons.

That target was achieved in May 2021, with Roma captain Elisa Bartoli raising the Coppa Italia trophy as she helped her hometown club defeat AC Milan on penalties. In April 2023, she led Roma to their first women's Serie A title in history.

== International career ==
She was called up to be part of the national team for the UEFA Women's Euro 2013.

Bartoli was called up to the Italy squad for the UEFA Women's Euro 2017.

Bartoli was called up to the Italy squad for the 2019 FIFA Women's World Cup.

On 26 June 2022, Bartoli was announced in the Italy squad for the UEFA Women's Euro 2022.

On 2 July 2023, Bartoli was called up to the 23-player Italy squad for the 2023 FIFA Women's World Cup.

== Career statistics ==
=== International ===
As of match played 15 November 2022

Appearances and goals by national team and year
National team	Year	Apps	Goals
Italy	2013	5	0
Italy	2014	8	0
Italy	2015	9	1
Italy	2016	10	0
Italy	2017	6	0
Italy	2018	9	0
Italy	2019	18	2
Italy	2020	5	0
Italy	2021	5	0
Italy	2022	10	0
Total		85	3

Scores and results list Italy's goal tally first, score column indicates score after each Bartoli goal.

List of international goals scored by Elisa Bartoli
No.	Date	Venue	Opponent	Score	Result	Competition
1	27 October 2015	Letní Stadion, Chomutov, Czech Republic	Czech Republic	3–0	3–0	UEFA Women's Euro 2017 qualifying
2	29 August 2019	Ramat Gan Stadium, Ramat Gan, Israel	Israel	2–1	3–2	UEFA Women's Euro 2022 qualifying
3	4 October 2019	Centenary Stadium, Ta'Qali, Malta	Malta	1–0	2–0	UEFA Women's Euro 2022 qualifying
4	7 March 2020	Vista Municipal Stadium, Parchal, Portugal	New Zealand	3–0	3–0	2020 Algarve Cup

== Honours ==
=== Club ===
Roma CF

- Serie A2: 2007–08

ASD Torres Calcio

- Serie A: 2012–13
- Supercoppa Italiana: 2012–13, 2013–14

Fiorentina

- Serie A: 2016–2017
- Coppa Italia: 2016–2017, 2017–2018

Roma

- Serie A: 2022–23
- Coppa Italia: 2020–21
- Supercoppa Italiana: 2022–23

Italy U19

- UEFA Women's Under-19 Championship: 2008

Individual

- AIC Best Women's XI (2): 2019, 2020
