= 2010–11 Serie A (women) =

Serie A
- Season: 2010–11
- Champions: Torres (5th title)
- Relegated: Südtirol; Orlandia 97
- UEFA Women's Champions League: Torres; Tavagnacco
- Matches: 182
- Goals: 628 (3.45 per match)
- Top goalscorer: Patrizia Panico; Daniela Sabatino (25 goals each)
- Biggest home win: Brescia 7–0 Firenze; Mozzanica 7–0 Firenze; Bardolino Verona 7–0 Lazio
- Biggest away win: Venezia 0–8 Reggiana; Lazio 0–8 Tavagnacco; Südtirol 1–9 Tavagnacco
- Highest scoring: 10 goals: Südtirol 1–9 Tavagnacco

The 2010-11 Serie A was the 44th edition of the premier category of the Italian women's football championship. It was won by defending champion Torres, which won all matches except for a tie against Brescia. With this trophy Torres reached Lazio, which narrowly avoided relegation, as the most successful team in the Serie A with five titles. UPC Tavagnacco was the championship's runner-up for the first time, also qualifying for the 2011-12 Champions League.

The competition was expanded from twelve to fourteen teams for this season, with Firenze, Mozzanica, Orlandia 97 and Südtirol Vintl replacing Atalanta and ASD Fiammamonza 1970 and joining Bardolino, Brescia, Chiasiellis, Lazio, Reggiana, Roma, Tavagnacco, Torino, Torres and Venezia 1984. Südtirol and Orlandia were relegated.

== League table ==
Pos	Team	Pld	W	D	L	GF	GA	GD	Pts	Qualification or relegation
1	Torres (C, Q)	26	25	1	0	98	8	+90	76	Qualification to Champions League
2	Tavagnacco (Q)	26	20	3	3	86	23	+63	63	Qualification to Champions League
3	Brescia	26	18	5	3	59	13	+46	59	
4	Mozzanica	26	14	1	11	69	53	+16	43	
5	Bardolino Verona	26	11	3	12	54	42	+12	35	
6	Roma	26	9	6	11	29	40	−11	33	
7	Torino	26	9	5	12	39	47	−8	32	
8	Chiasiellis	26	9	5	12	30	41	−11	32	
9	Venezia 1984	26	9	5	12	26	57	−31	32	
10	Reggiana	26	7	5	14	28	44	−16	26	
11	Firenze	26	6	5	15	25	66	−41	23	
12	Lazio	26	6	4	16	24	71	−47	22	
13	Südtirol (R)	26	6	3	17	31	68	−37	21	Relegation to Serie A2
14	Orlandia 97 (R)	26	3	9	14	30	55	−25	18	Relegation to Serie A2

Source: CalcioDonne (in Italian)
Rules for classification: 1) points; 2) number of wins; 3) goal difference; 4) number of goals scored
(C) Champions; (Q) Qualified for the phase indicated; (R) Relegated

== Results ==
Home \ Away	BAR	BRE	CHI	FIR	LAZ	MOZ	ORL	REG	ROM	SUD	TAV	TRN	TOR	VEN
Bardolino		1–2	2–3	1–0	7–0	2–4	4–1	4–0	1–2	4–1	0–1	4–1	0–1	3–1
Brescia	2–0		3–1	7–0	0–1	4–0	4–1	2–0	4–2	3–0	0–2	1–0	0–2	5–0
Chiasiellis	1–4	0–3		1–3	4–0	0–0	0–2	1–0	1–0	0–1	1–0	0–0	1–2	4–2
Firenze	0–1	0–4	2–2		1–2	0–3	2–1	2–1	1–1	3–2	0–4	1–2	0–5	0–1
Lazio	2–3	0–0	0–2	1–0		0–6	2–1	0–1	2–3	0–1	0–8	1–1	0–7	1–1
Mozzanica	1–0	0–2	2–1	7–0	6–2		6–1	1–3	3–1	3–4	1–4	4–1	0–6	4–0
Orlandia 97	3–3	0–1	1–1	0–0	2–2	5–4		1–2	0–2	3–3	3–4	2–0	0–2	0–0
Reggiana	2–2	0–0	2–1	2–1	1–2	1–5	1–1		0–1	2–1	1–6	0–2	0–3	0–3
Roma	2–1	0–3	0–0	0–1	4–1	1–3	0–0	2–0		3–0	1–1	0–3	0–5	1–0
Südtirol	4–1	0–4	1–2	0–3	1–3	1–2	2–1	1–0	2–2		1–9	2–2	0–3	1–3
Tavagnacco	3–1	1–1	6–0	5–0	1–0	3–1	3–0	1–1	2–0	5–1		4–1	1–2	2–0
Torino	1–2	1–3	0–1	7–1	2–1	3–2	1–0	0–0	1–1	2–1	3–6		0–6	5–0
Torres	1–0	1–1	4–2	4–1	5–0	5–0	5–0	1–0	3–0	4–0	4–1	3–0		7–1
Venezia	1–2	0–0	1–0	1–1	3–1	3–1	1–1	0–8	2–0	1–0	0–3	1–0	0–7	

Legend: Blue = home team win; Yellow = draw; Red = away team win.

== Top scorers ==
Rank	Player	Team	Goals
1	(Italy) Patrizia Panico	Torres	25
1	(Italy) Daniela Sabatino	Brescia	25
3	(Italy) Penelope Riboldi	Tavagnacco	19
4	(Italy) Tatiana Bonetti	Tavagnacco	18
5	(Italy) Silvia Fuselli	Torres	16
5	(Italy) Cristiana Girelli	Bardolino	16
7	(Italy) Chiara Piccinno	Mozzanica	14
7	(Italy) Valentina Boni	Brescia	14
7	(Italy) Ilaria Mauro	Tavagnacco	14
7	(Italy) Evelyn Vicchiarello	Chiasiellis	14
