= Alessia Tuttino =

Italian footballer (born 1983)

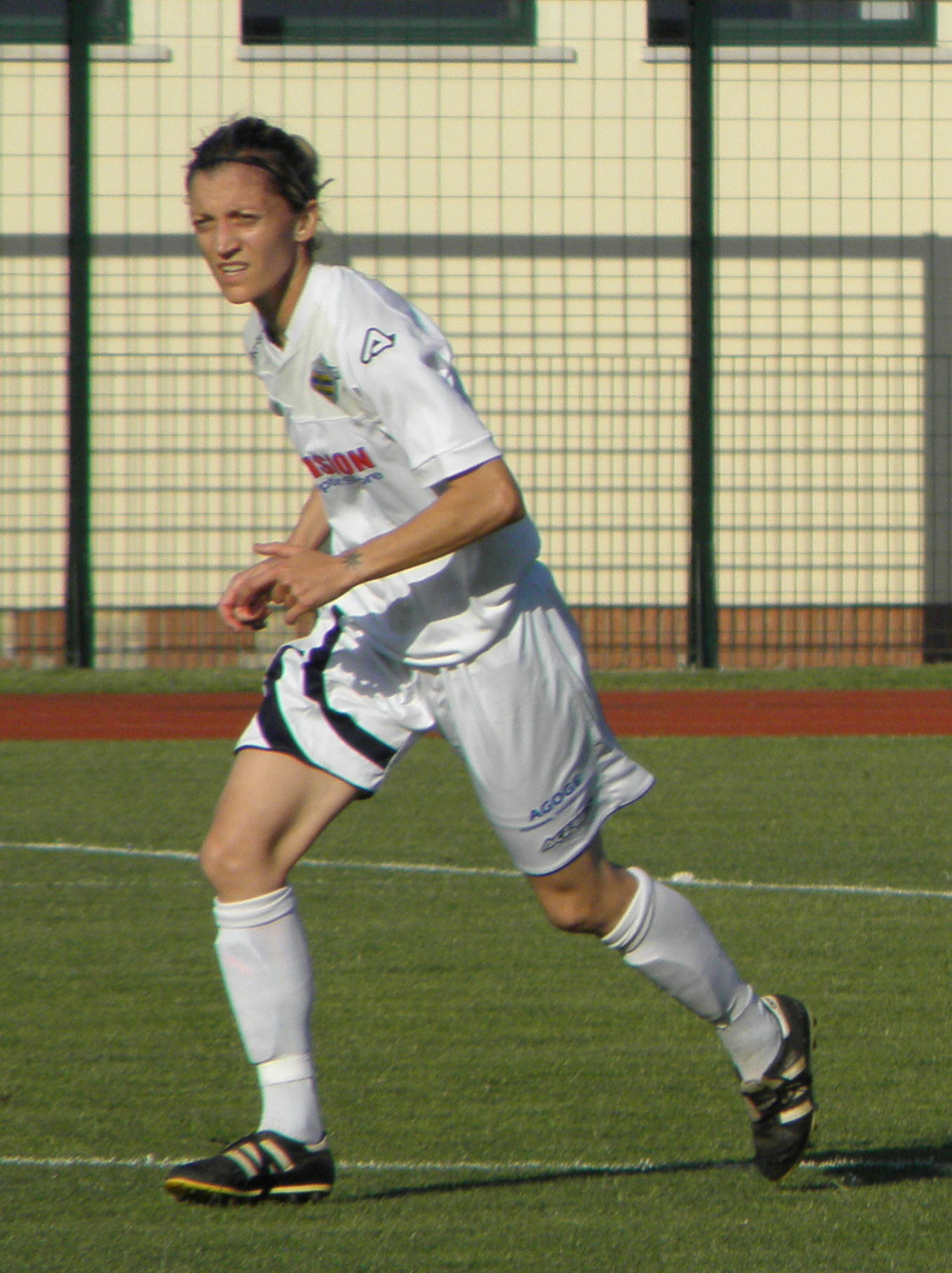
- Alessia Tuttino in 2018

Personal information
- Full name: Alessia Tuttino
- Date of birth: 15 March 1983 (age 43)
- Place of birth: Udine, Italy
- Height: 1.63 m (5 ft 4 in)
- Position: Midfielder

Team information
- Current team: Tavagnacco
- Number: 19

Senior career*
Years	Team	Apps	(Gls)
1999–2001	Rivignano		
2001–2002	Foroni Verona		
2002–2009	Bardolino		
2009	Chiasiellis	4	(0)
2009–2010	Bardolino	15	(1)
2010–2011	Roma CF	23	(4)
2011–	Tavagnacco	168	(15)

International career^{‡}
2002–2016	Italy	133	(10)
- * Club domestic league appearances and goals as of 15:42, 25 July 2018 (UTC) ‡ National team caps and goals as of 16 February 2016

Alessia Tuttino (born 15 March 1983) is an Italian football midfielder who plays for UPC Tavagnacco of Serie A and the Italy women's national football team. At club level she previously represented TC Rivignano, Foroni Verona, ASD Bardolino and Roma CF. She was part of the Italian squad at the 2009 and 2013 editions of the UEFA Women's Championship.

A central midfielder with a high work rate, Tuttino's playing style has sometimes been compared to that of the contemporary male footballer Gennaro Gattuso.

== International career ==
Tuttino made her senior debut for Italy on 13 February 2002, in a 2–0 friendly win over the Netherlands.

A cruciate ligament injury caused a disappointed Tuttino to miss UEFA Women's Euro 2005. She appeared in her first major championships at UEFA Women's Euro 2009, where she scored the winning goal in the first match of the tournament against England.

National coach Antonio Cabrini named Tuttino in his selection for UEFA Women's Euro 2013 in Sweden. Italy were eliminated in the quarter-finals by Germany, as they had been in 2009.

However, she finished her international career with 133 appearances and 10 goals.

Goals scored for the Italian WNT in official competitions
Competition	Stage	Date	Location	Opponent	Goals	Result	Overall
2005 UEFA Euro	Qualifiers	2003–03–30	Trento	Serbia and Montenegro	1	8–0	2
2005 UEFA Euro	Qualifiers	2004–11–13	Crotone	Czech Republic	1	2–1	2
2009 UEFA Euro	Qualifiers	2007–10–27	Bük	Hungary	1	3–1	2
2009 UEFA Euro	First Stage	2009–08–25	Lahti	England	1	2–1	2
2011 FIFA World Cup	Qualifiers	2010–10–23	Treviso	Switzerland	1	1–0	1
2015 FIFA World Cup	Qualifiers	2014–09–17	Vercelli	North Macedonia	1	15–0	1
