= Gioia Masia =

Italian footballer

Personal information
- Full name: Margherita Gioia Masia
- Date of birth: 22 January 1977 (age 49)
- Place of birth: Sassari, Italy
- Height: 1.62 m (5 ft 4 in)
- Position: Defender

Senior career*
Years	Team	Apps	(Gls)
- Lazio
- Torres
2006–2011	Roma CF		
2011–	Tavagnacco		

International career
2000–2006	Italy		
- * Club domestic league appearances and goals

Margherita Gioia Masia is an Italian football defender, currently playing for UPC Tavagnacco in Serie A. She has also played for SS Lazio, Torres CF and Roma CF.

She has been a member of the Italian national team, debuting in 2000, and took part in the 2001 and 2005 European Championships.
