= Silvia Fuselli =

Italian footballer (born 1981)

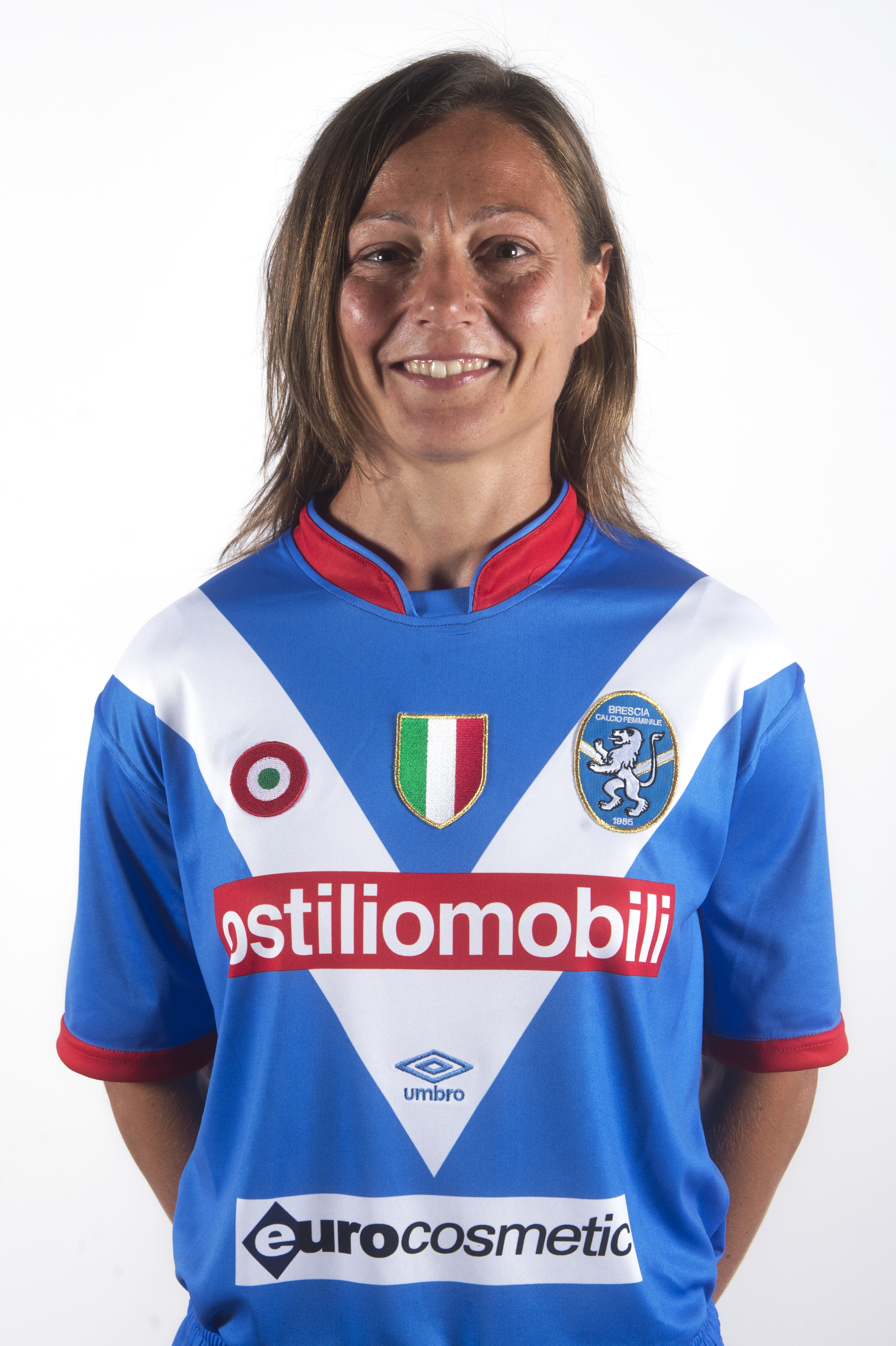

Personal information
- Full name: Silvia Fuselli
- Date of birth: 1 July 1981 (age 45)
- Place of birth: Cecina, Italy
- Height: 1.63 m (5 ft 4 in)
- Position: Striker

Team information
- Current team: Fimauto Valpolicellaa

Senior career*
Years	Team	Apps	(Gls)
1997–2003	Lucca		
2003–2006	Agliana CF	53	(18)
2006–2007	Torino CF	16	(13)
2007–2014	Torres CF	173	(100)
2014–2016	AGSM Verona	48	(26)
2016–	ACF Brescia	22	(4)
	Fimauto Valpolicella	18	(5)

International career
2006–2014	Italy		
- * Club domestic league appearances and goals

Silvia Fuselli (born in Cecina, 1 July 1981) is an Italian footballer who currently plays as a striker for Fimauto Valpolicella in Serie A. She has also played for Agliana, Torino, Torres, Verona and Brescia, and she has been a member of the Italian national team.

She debuted with the Italian national team on 29 March 2006 in a qualifying match for the 2007 World Cup against Greece. She scored 3 goals at the 2007 Algarve Cup and contributed to Italy's qualification for the Euro 2009 with 2 goals throughout the qualification stage, subsequently playing 24 minutes in two matches in Finland.

Goals for the Italian WNT in official competitions
Competition	Stage	Date	Location	Opponent	Goals	Result	Overall
2011 FIFA World Cup	Qualifiers	2009–09–19	Domžale	Slovenia	1	8–0	1
2011 FIFA World Cup	Qualifiers	2009–10–24	Yerevan	Armenia	1	8–0	1
2015 FIFA World Cup	Qualifiers	2014–05–08	Skopje	North Macedonia	1	11–0	1

== Honours ==
Torres Calcio Femminile

- Serie A 2009–10, 2010–11, 2011–12, 2012–13
- Coppa Italia, 2007–08, 2010–11
- Supercoppa Italiana, 2009, 2010, 2011, 2012, 2013
- Italy Women's Cup, 2008
