= Evelyn Vicchiarello =

Italian footballer (born 1986)

Personal information
- Full name: Evelyn Vicchiarello
- Date of birth: 24 October 1986 (age 40)
- Place of birth: Lanciano, Italy
- Height: 1.64 m (5 ft 5 in)
- Position: Striker

Senior career*
Years	Team	Apps	(Gls)
- Atletico Ortona
2001–2002	Lux Chieti		
2002–2005	Girls Roseto		
2005–2007	Vigor Senigallia		
2007–2008	Bardolino	19	(7)
2008–2010	Reggiana	42	(18)
2010–2012	Chiasiellis	81	(32)
2013–2014	Tavagnacco	27	(6)
2014–2015	Firenze	12	(5)
2015–2016	Fiorentina	22	(11)
2016–2017	Chieti	22	(0)
2017–2020	Florentia	65	(24)

International career
2005–	Italy		
- * Club domestic league appearances and goals

Evelyn Vicchiarello (24 October 1986) is an Italian former football striker, who played for Florentia of Serie A.

As an Under-19 international she played the 2004 U-19 European Championship, and the following year she played her first game for the senior Italian national team. She was included in the squad for the 2009 European Championship, and subsequently took part in the 2011 World Cup qualifying.

== Titles ==
- 1 Italian League (2008)
