= Michela Greco =

Italian footballer (born 1983)

Personal information
- Full name: Michela Greco
- Date of birth: 27 July 1983 (age 43)
- Place of birth: Varese, Italy
- Height: 1.83 m (6 ft 0 in)
- Position: Midfielder

Senior career*
Years	Team	Apps	(Gls)
- Trecate
2000–2001	Milan		
2001–2002	Rapid Lugano		
2002–2003	Bardolino		
2003–2010	Fiammamonza		
2010–2011	Chiasiellis		
2011–2012	Milan		
2012–2013	Riviera di Romagna		
2013–2014	Inter Milan		
2014	Cuneo		

International career
2006–2007	Italy	6	(1)
- * Club domestic league appearances and goals

Michela Greco (born 27 July 1983) is an Italian former football midfielder who played in the Serie A for clubs including ASDF Riviera di Romagna, ASD Fiammamonza, ASDC Chiasiellis and ACF Milan. She has been a member of the Italy national team, scoring one goal in the 2007 World Cup qualifying against Greece.
