= List of ASD Women Torres Calcio seasons =

Season	Div.	Pos.	Pl.	W	D	L	GS	GA	P	Domestic Cup	Other	Notes
2010–11	Serie A	1/14	26	25	1	0	98	8	76	Winner		Winner
2011–12	Serie A	1/14	26	21	3	2	83	11	66			Winner
2012–13	Serie A	1/16	30	26	3	1	108	13	81			Winner
2013–14	Serie A	2/16	30	27	1	2	108	18	82			
Disbanded
2020–21	Serie C	1/14										Promoted
2021–22	Serie B	5/14	26	13	3	10	35	37	42			
