= Italy Women's Cup =

The Italy Women's Cup was an Italian invitational women's football competition organized by the Lega Nazionale Dilettanti confronting the 2nd, 3rd and 4th ranking teams in the Serie A Femminile, the Italian Women's Cup champion or runner-up and several foreign clubs. Established in 2003, it intended to develop itself into the UEFA Cup's female counterpart but it was never recognized by UEFA. Five editions were carried out until 2008 before it was discontinued. Torres CF was the competition's most successful team with two titles. SS Lazio, Lada Togliatti and Lehenda Chernihiv also won one title each.

== List of finals ==
Year	Winner	Score	Runner-up	3rd	Score	4th
2003	(Italy) Lazio	1–0	(Italy) Fiammamonza			
2004	(Italy) Torres	2–2 (6–5 p)	(Russia) Lada Togliatti			
2005	(Russia) Lada Togliatti	1–0	(Italy) Torres	(Ukraine) Lehenda Chernihiv	1–0	(Denmark) Fortuna Hjørring
2006	(Ukraine) Lehenda Chernihiv	0–0 (3–2 p)	(Russia) Lada Togliatti	(Italy) Torino	3–2	(Italy) Torres
2008	(Italy) Torres	2–0	(Italy) Fiammamonza	(Romania) Clujana	3–2	(Italy) Torino

== Results ==
=== 2003 ===
==== Group stage ====
Team	Pld	W	D	L	GF	GA	Pts
(Italy) Lazio	3	3	0	0	7	1	9
(Czech Republic) Sparta Prague	3	2	0	1	8	1	6
(Italy) Torres	3	1	0	2	5	3	3
(Greece) Filiriakos	3	0	0	3	1	16	0

Team	Pld	W	D	L	GF	GA	Pts
(Italy) Fiammamonza	3	2	0	1	4	3	6
(Italy) Bardolino	3	2	0	1	6	3	6
(Netherlands) Saestum	3	1	1	1	4	3	4
(Finland) Sporting Raisio	3	0	1	2	3	8	1

==== Semifinals ====
Team 1	Score	Team 2
Lazio (Italy)	5–3	(Italy) Bardolino
Fiammamonza (Italy)	1–1 (6–5 p)	(Czech Republic) Sparta Prague

==== Final ====
Team 1	Score	Team 2
Lazio (Italy)	1–0	(Italy) Fiammamonza

=== 2004 ===
==== Group stage ====
Team	Pld	W	D	L	GF	GA	Pts
(Italy) Torres	3	3	0	0	7	1	9
(Netherlands) Saestum	3	2	0	1	3	3	6
(Ukraine) Lehenda Chernihiv	3	1	0	2	3	3	3
(Italy) Lazio	3	0	0	3	2	8	0

Team	Pld	W	D	L	GF	GA	Pts
(Russia) Lada Togliatti	3	1	2	0	3	2	5
(Italy) Milan	3	1	2	0	2	1	5
(Italy) Bardolino	3	1	0	2	4	5	3
(Finland) HJK Helsinki	3	0	2	1	5	4	2

==== Semifinals ====
Team 1	Score	Team 2
Torres (Italy)	5–1	(Italy) Milan
Lada Togliatti (Russia)	5–0	(Netherlands) Saestum

==== Final ====
Team 1	Score	Team 2
Torres (Italy)	2–2 (6–5 p)	(Russia) Lada Togliatti

=== 2005 ===
==== Group stage ====
Team	Pld	W	D	L	GF	GA	Pts
(Italy) Torres	2	2	0	0	5	2	6
(Poland) Wroclaw	2	1	0	1	7	5	3
(Czech Republic) Slavia Prague	2	0	0	2	1	6	0

Team	Pld	W	D	L	GF	GA	Pts
(Denmark) Fortuna Hjørring	2	1	1	0	7	5	4
(Italy) Torino	2	1	1	0	4	3	4
(Czech Republic) Compex Otrokovice	2	0	0	2	2	5	0

Team	Pld	W	D	L	GF	GA	Pts
(Russia) Lada Togliatti	2	1	0	0	3	1	3
(Italy) Reggiana	2	1	0	1	1	1	3
(Finland) Espoo	3	1	0	1	1	3	3

Team	Pld	W	D	L	GF	GA	Pts
(Ukraine) Lehenda Chernihiv	2	1	1	0	8	1	4
(Italy) Atalanta	2	1	1	0	5	1	4
(Austria) Tiroler Loden	3	0	0	2	0	11	0

==== Semifinals ====
Team 1	Score	Team 2
Torres (Italy)	3–0	(Denmark) Fortuna Hjørring
Lada Togliatti (Russia)	4–1	(Ukraine) Lehenda Chernihiv

==== 3rd position ====
Team 1	Score	Team 2
Fortuna Hjørring (Denmark)	0–1	(Ukraine) Lehenda Chernihiv

==== Final ====
Team 1	Score	Team 2
Torres (Italy)	0–1	(Russia) Lada Togliatti

=== 2006 ===
==== Group stage ====
Team	Pld	W	D	L	GF	GA	Pts
(Russia) Lada Togliatti	2	2	0	0	5	2	6
(Italy) Vigor Senigallia	2	1	0	1	5	3	3
(Spain) Torrejón	2	0	0	2	2	7	0

Team	Pld	W	D	L	GF	GA	Pts
(Italy) Torino	2	2	0	0	8	2	6
(Finland) HJK Helsinki	2	1	0	1	3	3	3
(Italy) Calabria XI	2	0	0	2	2	8	0

Team	Pld	W	D	L	GF	GA	Pts
(Ukraine) Lehenda Chernihiv	2	2	0	0	3	2	6
(Italy) Bardolino	2	1	0	1	3	2	3
(Serbia) Masinac Nis	2	0	0	2	2	4	0

Team	Pld	W	D	L	GF	GA	Pts
(Italy) Torres	2	1	1	0	9	1	4
(England) Charlton Athletic	2	1	1	0	6	2	4
(Hungary) Íris	2	0	0	2	1	13	0

==== Semifinals ====
Team 1	Score	Team 2
Lada Togliatti (Russia)	3–2	(Italy) Torino
Lehenda Chernihiv (Ukraine)	1–0	(Italy) Torres

==== 3rd position ====
Team 1	Score	Team 2
Torino (Italy)	3–2	(Italy) Torres

==== Final ====
Team 1	Score	Team 2
Lada Togliatti (Russia)	0–0 (2–3 p)	(Ukraine) Lehenda Chernihiv

=== 2008 ===
==== Group stage ====
Team	Pld	W	D	L	GF	GA	Pts
(Italy) Fiammamonza	3	3	0	0	14	0	9
(Italy) Torino	3	2	0	1	15	5	3
(Italy) Atalanta	3	1	0	2	5	10	3
(Latvia) Ceriba	3	0	0	3	1	19	0

Team	Pld	W	D	L	GF	GA	Pts
(Italy) Torres	3	2	1	0	6	2	7
(Romania) Clujana	3	1	2	0	6	3	5
(Italy) Tavagnacco	3	1	1	1	4	4	4
(Slovakia) Slovan Duslo Šaľa	3	0	0	3	5	12	0

==== Semifinals ====
Team 1	Score	Team 2
Fiammamonza (Italy)	3–0	(Romania) Clujana
Torres (Italy)	3–0	(Italy) Torino

==== 3rd position ====
Team 1	Score	Team 2
Clujana (Romania)	3–2	(Italy) Torino

==== Final ====
Team 1	Score	Team 2
Fiammamonza (Italy)	0–2	(Italy) Torres
