= Foroni Verona FC =

Italian football club

Foroni Verona
- Full name: Foroni Verona Football Club
- Founded: 1989
- Dissolved: 2004
- Ground: Stadio Almerina, Verona
Home colours

Foroni Verona Football Club was an Italian women's football club from Verona.

Founded in 1989 as A.C. Foroni, it reached Serie A in 1999, and soon became one of the leading Italian teams in the first half of the 2000s, winning two championships in 2003 and 2004 preceded by two silver medals and the 2002 national cup. However, it was disbanded at its peak in 2004. As the national champion it represented Italy in the 2004 European Cup.

Notable players include internationals Paola Brumana, Elisa Camporese, Chiara Gazzoli, Rita Guarino, Katia Serra, Simona Sodini and Alessia Tuttino.

== Titles ==
- 2 Italian Leagues (2003, 2004)
- 1 Italian Cup (2002)

=== Record in UEFA competitions ===
Season	Competition	Stage	Result	Opponent
2003-04	UEFA Women's Cup	Group Stage	10-0	(Croatia) Osijek
			0-0	(Russia) Energiya Voronezh
			4-0	(Hungary) Femina Budapest
