= Penelope Riboldi =

Italian footballer (born 1986)

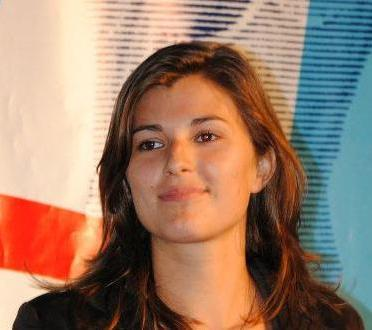

Personal information
- Full name: Penelope Riboldi
- Date of birth: July 2, 1986 (age 40)
- Place of birth: Brescia, Italy
- Height: 1.58 m (5 ft 2 in)
- Position: Striker

Team information
- Current team: Pink Bari
- Number: 27

Senior career*
Years	Team	Apps	(Gls)
2004–2006	Atalanta	79	(61)
2006–2007	Bardolino	22	(8)
2007–2010	Atalanta	59	(16)
2010–2012	Tavagnacco	50	(32)
2012–2013	Napoli	7	(0)
2013–2015	Mozzanica	51	(8)
2015–2016	Pink Bari	20	(3)
2016–2017	Chieti	14	(2)
2017–2018	Valpolicella	19	(1)
2018–2019	ChievoVerona Valpo	13	(0)
2019–2020	Roma CF	13	(0)
2020–2021	Pomigliano	13	(1)
2021–	Pink Bari	0	(0)

International career
2004–2006	Italy U-19	10	(4)
2004–2005	Italy U-20	3	(0)
- * Club domestic league appearances and goals

Penelope Riboldi (2 July 1986) is an Italian football forward, currently playing for Pink Bari of Italy's Serie A.

She was the third top scorer of the 2010–11 season with 19 goals while playing for UPC Tavagnacco, with whom she played in the 2011–12 Champions League, scoring a winner over LdB Malmö.
