= Patrizia Panico =

Italian footballer (born 1975)

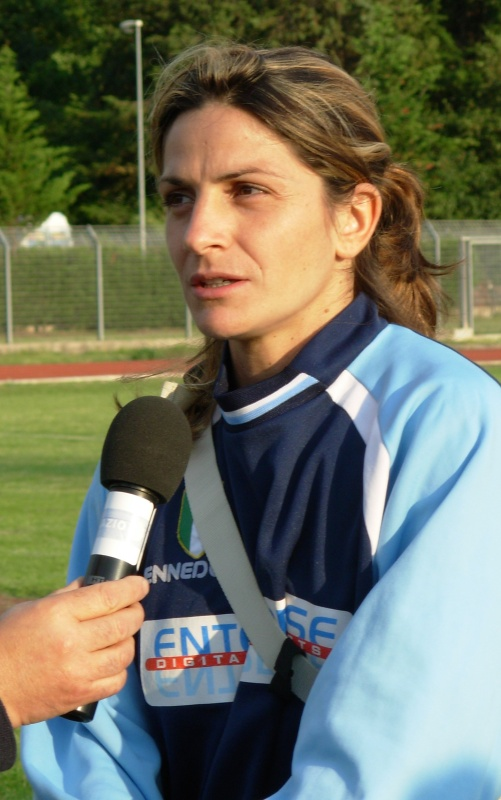

Personal information
- Date of birth: 8 February 1975 (age 51)
- Place of birth: Rome, Italy
- Height: 1.64 m (5 ft 5 in)
- Position: Striker

Youth career
- 1988–1991: Borussia
- 1991–1993: Valmontone

Senior career*
Years	Team	Apps	(Gls)
1993–1996	Lazio	71	(32)
1996–1997	Torino	30	(32)
1997–1998	Modena Amadio	28	(29)
1998–2003	Lazio	209	(191)
2003–2004	Milan	22	(5)
2004–2006	Torino	44	(56)
2006–2009	Bardolino	62	(73)
2009–2014	Torres	134	(175)
2010	→ Sky Blue (loan)	10	(0)
2014–2015	Verona	25	(34)
2015–2016	Fiorentina	21	(20)
Total		656	(647)

International career
1996–2014	Italy	196	(110)

Managerial career
- 2017–2018: Italy U16 (assistant)
- 2018–2021: Italy U15
- 2020–2021: Italy U21 (assistant)
- 2021–2023: Fiorentina
- * Club domestic league appearances and goals

Patrizia Panico (Italian pronunciation: [paˈtrittsja paˈniːko]; born 8 February 1975) is an Italian former footballer who is formerly the manager of Fiorentina in the Italian women's Serie A. A prolific goalscorer, Panico is a longstanding member of the Italy women's national team; she won over 185 caps for Italy, and also served as her national side's captain. She is a veteran of Italy's 1997, 2001, 2005, 2009 and 2013 UEFA Women's Championship campaigns and played at the 1999 FIFA Women's World Cup. In a club career that spanned more than two decades, Panico won ten Scudetti and collected five Coppa Italia winner's medals with her various clubs. She was Serie A's top scorer on 14 occasions (an Italian record for her category) and spent part of 2010 in the United States, representing Women's Professional Soccer (WPS) club Sky Blue. Panico is nicknamed "The Scorpion" due to her deadly goalscoring instincts.

== Club career ==
In addition to Torres, Panico played for Lazio, Torino, Modena Amadio, Milan and Bardolino, as well as Sky Blue of the United States' Women's Professional Soccer (WPS). She was the Serie A's top scorer for ten seasons.

At Modena in 1997–98, Panico won her first Serie A title. She played alongside Carolina Morace, and came to be seen as the heir apparent to Morace's title as Italy's best female player.

In the months before the professional Women's United Soccer Association (WUSA) began play in 2001, Panico was pursued by Philadelphia Charge. She had agreed terms, but the move was eventually derailed by red tape.

== International career ==
Panico made her senior international debut on 8 April 1996, in Italy's 4–1 UEFA Women's Euro 1997 qualifying win over Portugal in Mestre. She started the match and scored Italy's first goal after five minutes of play. (Note: Italian Football Federation (FIGC) sources list Panico's debut as Italy's earlier 4–1 win over Portugal at the 1995 Algarve Cup. This is contradicted by RSSSF and Panico's official website.) Panico was selected for the final tournament in Norway. She scored in a 2–2 group stage draw with Denmark, as Italy reached the final which they lost 2–0 to Germany.

At the 1999 FIFA Women's World Cup in the United States, Panico gave Italy the lead in their first game against Germany. The match at the Rose Bowl in Pasadena, California finished 1–1. The Italians were eliminated after a 2–0 defeat by Brazil in their next game, but recovered to beat Mexico 2–0. Panico scored the first goal and was hailed as "one of the world's most explosive players" by CNN Sports Illustrated.

On 11 November 1999, Panico scored a notable hat-trick against Germany in a 4–4 UEFA Women's Euro 2001 qualifying draw. At the final tournament, player of the match Panico scored twice in Italy's opening 2–1 win over Denmark at the Waldstadion in Aalen. The Italians narrowly failed to qualify from the group after a 1–1 draw with Norway and a 2–0 defeat by France.

Four years later, Panico was included in the squad for UEFA Women's Euro 2005 in North West England. She played in the Italians' 4–0 defeat to perennial champions Germany, which intersected defeats to France and Norway and preceded another first round exit.

At UEFA Women's Euro 2009 in Finland, Panico played in all four games and added two goals as the Italians went out to Germany in the quarter-finals. Four years later, national coach Antonio Cabrini named Panico in his selection for UEFA Women's Euro 2013 in Sweden. At 38, Panico entered her fifth European finals and admitted it was likely to be her last. She was left disappointed by another defeat by the Germans in the quarter-final at Myresjöhus Arena, Växjö.

On 2 October 2010, she scored against Ukraine for the FIFA Women's World Cup qualification at the Stadion Yuri Gagarin in Chernihiv.

== Career statistics ==
=== Club ===
Season	Squad	Championship			National Cups			Continental Cups			Other Cups			Total	
Season	Squad	League	Apps	Gls	League	Apps	Gls	League	Apps	Gls	League	Apps	Gls	Apps	Gls
1993–1994	Lazio	A	23	8	Coppa Italia	–	–	–	–	–	–	–	–	–	–
1994–1995	Lazio	A	19	5	Coppa Italia	?	?	–	–	–	–	–	–	19+	5+
1995–1996	Lazio	A	29	19	Coppa Italia	?	?	–	–	–	–	–	–	29+	19+
1996–1997	Torino	A	30	32	Coppa Italia	?	?	–	–	–	–	–	–	30+	32+
1997–1998	Modena	A	28	29	Coppa Italia	?	?	–	–	–	SI	1	0	29+	30+
1998–1999	Lazio	A	28	49	Coppa Italia	?	?	–	–	–	–	–	–	28+	49+
1999–2000	Lazio	A	29	41	Coppa Italia	?	?	–	–	–	SI	1	1	29+	41+
2000–2001	Lazio	A	29	41	Coppa Italia	?	?	–	–	–	–	–	–	29+	41+
2001–2002	Lazio	A	27	48	Coppa Italia	?	?	–	–	–	–	–	–	27+	48+
2002–2003	Lazio	A	26	35	Coppa Italia	?	?	UEFA WC	3	4	SI	1	0	30+	39+
Sept-Nov 2003	Lazio	A	8	7	Coppa Italia	0	0	–	–	–	SI	1	1	9	8
Total at Lazio			218	253		0+	0+	–	3	4		3	2	224+	259+
Nov 2003 -Jun 2004	Milan	A	13	9	Coppa Italia	5	1	–	–	–	–	–	–	27	6
2004–2005	Torino	A	19	32	Coppa Italia	?	?	–	–	–	–	–	–	19+	32+
2005–2006	Torino	A	20	24	Coppa Italia	?	?	–	–	–	–	–	–	20+	24+
Total at Torino			74	88		5+	1+		–	–		–	–	79+	89+
2006–2007	Bardolino	A	22	21	Coppa Italia	9	11	–	–	–	SI	1	0	32	33
2007–2008	Bardolino	A	19	27	Coppa Italia	7	8	UEFA WC	10	9	SI	1	0	37	44
2008–2009	Bardolino	A	21	23	CI	7	14	UEFA WC	5	1	SI	1	0	34	38
Total at Bardolino			62	73		23	33		15	10		3	0	103	116
2009–2010	Torres	A	22	17	Coppa Italia	5	1	UEFA WCL	8	5	SI	1	0	36	23
2010	Sky Blue	WPS	10	0		–	–		–	–		–	–	10	0
2010–2011	Torres	A	22	26	Coppa Italia	4	3	UEFA WCL	2	0	SI	1	0	29	26
2011–2012	Torres	A	25	28	Coppa Italia	4	2	UEFA WCL	4	2	SI	1	2	36	37
2012–2013	Torres	A	29	35	Coppa Italia	2	2	UEFA WCL	6	8	SI	1	2	38	47
2013–2014	Torres	A	30	43	Coppa Italia	1	1	UEFA WCL	6	2	SI	1	1	38	47
Total at Torres			98	106		15	8		20	15		4	5	137	133
2014–2015	Verona	A	25	34		–	–	–	–	–	–	–	–	25	34
2015–2016	Fiorentina	A	21	20	Coppa Italia	2	2	–	–	–	–	–	–	23	22
Total			549	618		50+	44+		38	29		11	6	591+	653+

=== International goals ===
No.	Date	Venue	Opponent	Score	Result	Competition
1.	7 April 1996	Mestre, Portugal	Portugal	1–0	4–1	UEFA Women's Euro 1997 qualifying
2.	31 May 1997	Salem, United States	Australia	1–0	3–0	1997 Women's U.S. Cup
3.	3 July 1997	Lillestrøm, Norway	Denmark	2–2	2–2	UEFA Women's Euro 1997
4.	1 November 1997	Nyon, Switzerland	Switzerland	?–?	1–3	1999 FIFA Women's World Cup qualification
5.	11 April 1998	Blois, France	France	3–2	3–2	1999 FIFA Women's World Cup qualification
6.	27 May 1998	Espoo, Finland	Finland	?–1	2–1	1999 FIFA Women's World Cup qualification
7.	6 January 1999	Sydney, Australia	Canada	1–0	1–0	1999 Australia Cup
8.	9 January 1999	Sydney, Australia	Australia	1–0	1–1	1999 Australia Cup
9.	20 June 1999	Pasadena, United States	Germany	1–0	1–1	1999 FIFA Women's World Cup
10.	27 June 1999	Foxborough, United States	Mexico	1–0	2–0	1999 FIFA Women's World Cup
11.	13 October 1999	Castelfranco di Sotto, Italy	Ukraine	1–0	1–0	UEFA Women's Euro 2001 qualifying
12.	11 November 1999	Isernia, Italy	Germany	1–2	4–4	UEFA Women's Euro 2001 qualifying
13.	11 November 1999	Isernia, Italy	Germany	2–3	4–4	UEFA Women's Euro 2001 qualifying
14.	11 November 1999	Isernia, Italy	Germany	3–3	4–4	UEFA Women's Euro 2001 qualifying
15.	25 June 2001	Aalen, Germany	Denmark	1–0	2–1	UEFA Women's Euro 2001
16.	25 June 2001	Aalen, Germany	Denmark	2–0	2–1	UEFA Women's Euro 2001
17.	30 March 2003	Trento, Italy	Serbia and Montenegro	6–0	8–0	UEFA Women's Euro 2005 qualifying
18.	30 March 2003	Trento, Italy	Serbia and Montenegro	7–0	8–0	UEFA Women's Euro 2005 qualifying
19.	19 July 2003	Vaasa, Finland	Finland	1–0	1–1	UEFA Women's Euro 2005 qualifying
20.	27 September 2003	Frauenfeld, Switzerland	Switzerland	1–0	1–0	UEFA Women's Euro 2005 qualifying
21.	18 March 2004	Lagos, Portugal	Finland	?–?	2–1	2004 Algarve Cup
22.	20 March 2004	Faro, Portugal	France	1–1	3–3 (3–4 p)	2004 Algarve Cup
23.	20 March 2004	Faro, Portugal	France	2–1	3–3 (3–4 p)	2004 Algarve Cup
24.	24 April 2004	Andria, Italy	Finland	1–0	1–1	UEFA Women's Euro 2005 qualifying
25.	26 June 2004	Benevento, Italy	Sweden	2–1	2–1	UEFA Women's Euro 2005 qualifying
26.	27 November 2004	Čáslav, Czech Republic	Czech Republic	2–0	3–0	UEFA Women's Euro 2005 qualifying
27.	24 September 2005	Monza, Italy	Ukraine	2–1	3–1	2007 FIFA Women's World Cup qualification
28.	2 November 2005	Sesto al Reghena, Italy	Serbia and Montenegro	2–0	6–0	2007 FIFA Women's World Cup qualification
29.	2 November 2005	Sesto al Reghena, Italy	Serbia and Montenegro	6–0	6–0	2007 FIFA Women's World Cup qualification
30.	22 April 2006	Athens, Greece	Greece	1–0	5–0	2007 FIFA Women's World Cup qualification
31.	22 April 2006	Athens, Greece	Greece	3–0	5–0	2007 FIFA Women's World Cup qualification
32.	22 April 2006	Athens, Greece	Greece	4–0	5–0	2007 FIFA Women's World Cup qualification
33.	22 April 2006	Athens, Greece	Greece	5–0	5–0	2007 FIFA Women's World Cup qualification
34.	23 September 2006	Rimini, Italy	Norway	1–2	1–2	2007 FIFA Women's World Cup qualification
35.	28 October 2006	Seoul, South Korea	Canada	2–3	2–3	2006 Peace Queen Cup
36.	1 November 2006	Changwon, South Korea	South Korea	2–1	2–1	2006 Peace Queen Cup
37.	7 March 2007	Lagos, Portugal	Iceland	2–1	2–1	2007 Algarve Cup
38.	12 March 2007	Silves, Portugal	Republic of Ireland	1–0	4–1	2007 Algarve Cup
39.	30 May 2007	Dublin, Ireland	Republic of Ireland	2–0	2–1	UEFA Women's Euro 2009 qualifying
40.	27 October 2007	Bük, Hungary	Hungary	2–1	3–1	UEFA Women's Euro 2009 qualifying
41.	31 October 2007	Parma, Italy	Romania	2–0	5–0	UEFA Women's Euro 2009 qualifying
42.	16 February 2008	Villacidro, Italy	Republic of Ireland	3–1	4–1	UEFA Women's Euro 2009 qualifying
43.	5 March 2008	Alvor, Portugal	Norway	1–1	2–4	2008 Algarve Cup
44.	10 March 2008	Loulé, Portugal	China	2–0	2–0	2008 Algarve Cup
45.	24 May 2008	Buftea, Romania	Romania	2–0	6–1	UEFA Women's Euro 2009 qualifying
46.	25 October 2008	Prague, Czech Republic	Czech Republic	1–0	1–0	UEFA Women's Euro 2009 qualifying
47.	29 October 2008	Gubbio, Italy	Czech Republic	2–0	2–1	UEFA Women's Euro 2009 qualifying
48.	7 February 2009	Canberra, Australia	Australia	2–0	5–1	Friendly
49.	7 February 2009	Canberra, Australia	Australia	4–0	5–1	Friendly
50.	7 February 2009	Canberra, Australia	Australia	5–1	5–1	Friendly
51.	25 August 2009	Lahti, Finland	England	1–1	2–1	UEFA Women's Euro 2009
52.	4 September 2009	Lahti, Finland	Germany	1–2	1–2	UEFA Women's Euro 2009
53.	19 September 2009	Domžale, Slovenia	Slovenia	8–0	8–0	2011 FIFA Women's World Cup qualification
54.	24 October 2009	Yerevan, Armenia	Armenia	8–0	8–0	2011 FIFA Women's World Cup qualification
55.	25 November 2009	Francavilla al Mare, Italy	Armenia	4–0	7–0	2011 FIFA Women's World Cup qualification
56.	25 November 2009	Francavilla al Mare, Italy	Armenia	7–0	7–0	2011 FIFA Women's World Cup qualification
57.	27 March 2010	Tocha, Portugal	Portugal	2–1	3–1	2011 FIFA Women's World Cup qualification
58.	19 June 2010	Montereale Valcellina, Italy	Slovenia	6–0	6–0	2011 FIFA Women's World Cup qualification
59.	15 September 2010	Gubbio, Italy	France	1–0	2–3	2011 FIFA Women's World Cup qualification – UEFA play-offs
60.	2 October 2010	Chernihiv, Ukraine	Ukraine	2–0	3–0	2011 FIFA Women's World Cup qualification – UEFA play-offs
61.	27 October 2010	Aarau, Switzerland	Switzerland	1–0	4–2	2011 FIFA Women's World Cup qualification – UEFA play-offs
62.	9 March 2011	Nicosia, Cyprus	Russia	1–0	2–0	2011 Cyprus Women's Cup
63.	19 November 2011	Pruszków, Poland	Poland	4–0	5–0	UEFA Women's Euro 2013 qualifying
64.	28 February 2012	Larnaca, Cyprus	Netherlands	1–0	1–2	2012 Cyprus Women's Cup
65.	6 March 2012	Paralimni, Cyprus	England	1–1	3–1	2012 Cyprus Women's Cup
66.	31 March 2012	Ferrara, Italy	Bosnia and Herzegovina	1–0	4–0	UEFA Women's Euro 2013 qualifying
67.	31 March 2012	Ferrara, Italy	Bosnia and Herzegovina	4–0	4–0	UEFA Women's Euro 2013 qualifying
68.	4 April 2012	Podolsk, Russia	Russia	1–0	2–0	UEFA Women's Euro 2013 qualifying
69.	4 April 2012	Podolsk, Russia	Russia	2–0	2–0	UEFA Women's Euro 2013 qualifying
70.	16 June 2012	Turin, Italy	Macedonia	2–0	9–0	UEFA Women's Euro 2013 qualifying
71.	16 June 2012	Turin, Italy	Macedonia	4–0	9–0	UEFA Women's Euro 2013 qualifying
72.	16 June 2012	Turin, Italy	Macedonia	6–0	9–0	UEFA Women's Euro 2013 qualifying
73.	16 September 2012	San Benedetto del Tronto, Italy	Poland	1–0	1–0	UEFA Women's Euro 2013 qualifying
99.	13 February 2014	Novara, Italy	Czech Republic	6–1	6–1	2015 FIFA Women's World Cup qualification
100.	10 March 2014	Larnaca, Cyprus	Finland	1–1	1–1	2014 Cyprus Women's Cup
101.	12 March 2014	Paralimni, Cyprus	Australia	2–5	2–5	2014 Cyprus Women's Cup
102.	10 April 2014	Cluj-Napoca, Romania	Romania	1–0	2–1	2015 FIFA Women's World Cup qualification
103.	8 May 2014	Skopje, Macedonia	Macedonia	1–0	11–0	2015 FIFA Women's World Cup qualification
104.	17 May 2014	Stadio Artemio Franchi, Florence, Italy	Bahrain	2–0	6–0	Friendly
105.	17 May 2014	Stadio Artemio Franchi, Florence, Italy	Bahrain	3–0	6–0	Friendly
106.	14 June 2014	Prague, Czech Republic	Czech Republic	1–0	4–0	2015 FIFA Women's World Cup qualification
107.	14 June 2014	Prague, Czech Republic	Czech Republic	2–0	4–0	2015 FIFA Women's World Cup qualification
108.	17 September 2014	Vercelli, Italy	Macedonia	3–0	15–0	2015 FIFA Women's World Cup qualification
109.	17 September 2014	Vercelli, Italy	Macedonia	4–0	15–0	2015 FIFA Women's World Cup qualification
110.	29 October 2014	Lviv, Ukraine	Ukraine	2–2	2–2	2015 FIFA Women's World Cup qualification – UEFA play-offs

== Honours ==
Modena

- Serie A: 1998
- Italian Women's Super Cup: 1998

Lazio

- Serie A: 2002
- Coppa Italia (women): 1999, 2003

Bardolino

- Italian Women's Cup: 2007, 2009
- Italian Women's Super Cup: 2007, 2008

AGSM Verona

- Serie A: 2007, 2008, 2009, 2015

Torres

- Serie A: 2010, 2011, 2012, 2013
- Italian Women's Cup: 2011
- Italian Women's Super Cup: 2009, 2010, 2011, 2012, 2013

Individual

- Italian Football Hall of Fame: 2015
- UEFA Women's Champions League top scorer: 2007–08 (9 goals)
- Serie A top scorer: 2010–11 (29 goals), 2011–12 (26 goals), 2012–13 (35 goals), 2013–14 (43 goals), 2014–15 (34 goals)
