= Paola Brumana =

Italian footballer

Personal information
- Full name: Paola Brumana
- Date of birth: November 26, 1982 (age 43)
- Place of birth: Como, Italy
- Position: Striker

Senior career*
Years	Team	Apps	(Gls)
1999–2003	FCF Como 2000		
2003–2004	Foroni Verona FC		
2004–2006	Bardolino Verona		
2006–2018	UPC Tavagnacco		

International career^{‡}
2004–2014	Italy	15	(1)
- * Club domestic league appearances and goals as of 21:18, 14 June 2022 (UTC) ‡ National team caps and goals as of 21:18, 14 June 2022 (UTC)

Paola Brumana (born 26 November 1982) is an Italian former football striker who played for several women's Serie A clubs and the Italy national team.

== Club career ==
She has played for UPC Tavagnacco from 2006 until June 2018.

== International career ==
Brumana made her senior debut for Italy on 13 November 2004, in a 3–2 friendly win over the Czech Republic. Not rated by national coach Pietro Ghedin, Brumana spent several years in the international wilderness before being recalled by Ghedin's successor Antonio Cabrini. She was selected by Cabrini to be part of the national team for UEFA Women's Euro 2013 in Sweden.

Goals scored for the Italian WNT in official competitions
Competition	Stage	Date	Location	Opponent	Goals	Result	Overall
2015 FIFA World Cup	Qualifiers	2014–05–08	Skopje	North Macedonia	1	11–0	1

== Honours ==
=== Club ===
Foroni Verona FC

- Women's Serie A: 2003–04

Bardolino Verona

- Women's Serie A: 2004–05
- Italian Women's Cup: 2005–06

UPC Tavagnacco

- Italian Women's Cup: 2012–13, 2013–14
