= Tatiana Bonetti =

Italian footballer (born 1991)

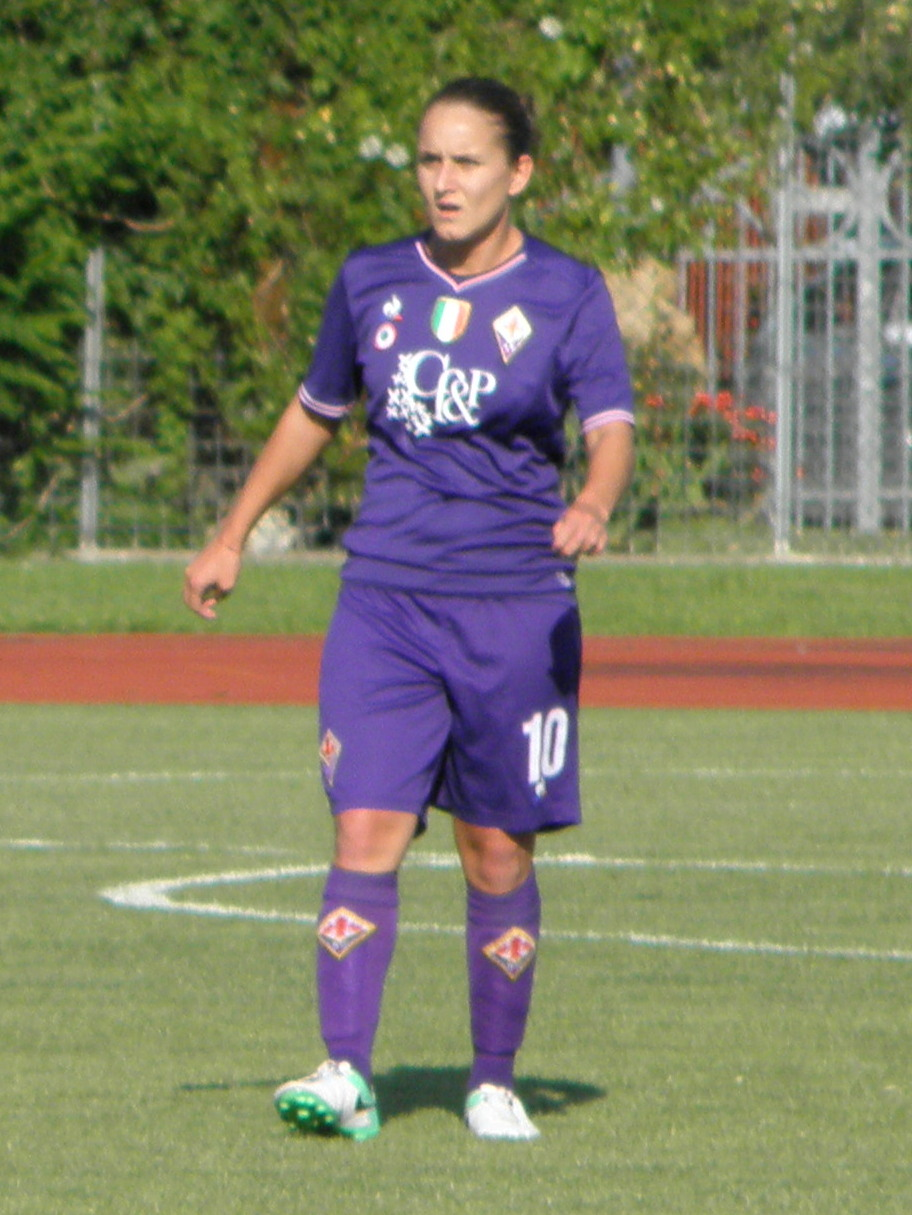

Personal information
- Full name: Tatiana Bonetti
- Date of birth: 15 December 1991 (age 34)
- Place of birth: Vigevano, Italy
- Height: 1.56 m (5 ft 1 in)
- Position: Forward

Team information
- Current team: Freedom FC

Senior career*
Years	Team	Apps	(Gls)
2007–2009	AC Riozzese	40	(16)
2009–2014	UPC Tavagnacco	109	(59)
2014–2016	AGSM Verona	46	(45)
2016–2021	Fiorentina	84	(57)
2021	Atlético Madrid	9	(0)
2021–2025	Inter Milan	47	(12)
2025–	Freedom FC	0	(0)

International career^{‡}
2008–2012	Italy U19	21	(11)
2011–	Italy	9	(1)
- * Club domestic league appearances and goals as of 21 August 2025 ‡ National team caps and goals as of 7 March 2020

Tatiana Bonetti (born 15 December 1991) is an Italian footballer who plays as a forward for Serie B club Freedom FC and the Italy women's national team.

== Club career ==
Bonetti has previously played for AC Riozzese, UPC Tavagnacco, AGSM Verona, Fiorentina FC, Atlético Madrid, and Inter Milan.

== International career ==
Bonetti was a member of the Italian Under-19 team that won the 2008 U-19 European Championship, where she scored a winner against Norway.

== International goals ==
No.	Date	Venue	Opponent	Score	Result	Competition
1.	8 April 2022	Stadio Ennio Tardini, Parma, Italy	Lithuania	7–0	7–0	2023 FIFA Women's World Cup qualification

== Honours ==
UPC Tavagnacco

- Coppa Italia: 2012–13, 2013–14

AGSM Verona

- Serie A: 2014–15

Fiorentina

- Serie A: 2016–17
- Coppa Italia: 2016–17, 2017–18
- Supercoppa Italiana: 2018

Italy U19

- UEFA Women's Under-19 Championship: 2008

Individual

- AIC Best Women's XI: 2020
