= Raquel Infante =

Portuguese footballer

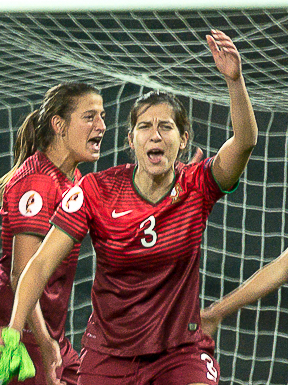

Personal information
- Full name: Raquel Pega Infante
- Date of birth: 19 September 1990 (age 36)
- Place of birth: Lisbon, Portugal
- Height: 1.73 m (5 ft 8 in)
- Positions: Defender; midfielder

Team information
- Current team: Logroño

Youth career
- CF Benfica

Senior career*
Years	Team	Apps	(Gls)
2006–2009	Ponte Frielas	25	
2009–2011	1º Dezembro	20	
2011–2012	UE L'Estartit	25	
2012–2013	C. Llanos Olivenza	18	
2013–2014	ASD Riviera di Romagna	15	(1)
2014–2015	USD San Zaccaria	13	(0)
2015–2016	CF Benfica	9	(0)
2016	Åland United	20	(0)
2016–2017	Levante UD	11	(0)
2017–2018	Rodez AF	22	(0)
2018–2020	Benfica	8	(3)
2020–	Logroño	0	(0)

International career^{‡}
2006–2007	Portugal U19	6	(0)
2014–	Portugal	22	(0)
- * Club domestic league appearances and goals as of 24 June 2019 ‡ National team caps and goals as of 31 May 2019

Raquel Pega Infante (born 19 September 1990) is a Portuguese professional footballer who plays as either a defender or midfielder for Spanish Primera División club EdF Logroño and the Portugal women's national team.

== Club career ==
Infante played for Ponte Frielas and 1º Dezembro, before embarking on a peripatetic career with clubs in Spain, Italy, Finland and France.

In December 2018, Infante was announced as an S.L. Benfica player. She had begun the season with EDF Logroño in Spain but failed to make any appearances due to recovering from surgery.

== International career ==
Infante was named by coach Francisco Neto in the 23-player Portugal national team for UEFA Women's Euro 2017.

== Honours ==
Benfica

- Campeonato Nacional II Divisão: 2018–19
- Supertaça de Portugal: 2019
