= Deborah Salvatori Rinaldi =

Italian footballer (born 1991)

Personal information
- Date of birth: 2 September 1991 (age 35)
- Place of birth: Penne, Italy
- Height: 1.65 m (5 ft 5 in)
- Position: Forward

Team information
- Current team: Ternana
- Number: 9

Senior career*
Years	Team	Apps	(Gls)
2010	Hellas Verona	?	(1)
2010–2011	Südtirol	18	(5)
2011–2015	Firenze	93	(31)
2015–2017	Fiorentina	31	(16)
2017–2018	Espanyol	12	(0)
2018–2019	Florentia	21	(11)
2019–2021	Milan	19	(3)
2021–2022	Pomigliano	19	(3)
2022–	Ternana	14	(3)

International career^{‡}
2019	Italy	1	(0)
- * Club domestic league appearances and goals as of 26 March 2023 ‡ National team caps and goals as of 12 November 2019

Deborah Salvatori Rinaldi (born 2 September 1991) is an Italian footballer who plays as a forward for Serie B club Ternana. She played once for the Italy women's national team.
