= Simona Sodini =

Italian footballer (born 1982)

Personal information
- Full name: Simona Sodini
- Date of birth: 21 July 1982 (age 44)
- Place of birth: Sassari, Italy
- Height: 1.60 m (5 ft 3 in)
- Position: Striker

Senior career*
Years	Team	Apps	(Gls)
1997–1998	Attilia Nuoro	22	(25)
1998–1999	Milan	19	(9)
1999–2000	Foroni Verona		
2000–2002	Atletico Oristano	44	(15)
2002–2005	Torino	48	(33)
2005–2006	Bojano	5	(5)
2006–2007	Atletico Oristano	22	(13)
2007–2012	Torino	109	(72)
2012–2013	Riviera di Romagna	26	(22)
2013	Inter Milan	10	(1)
2014	Luserna	12	(16)
2014–2017	Cuneo	43	(23)
2017–2018	Juventus	3	(0)

International career
2002–2011	Italy	3	(1)
- * Club domestic league appearances and goals

Simona Sodini is an Italian former footballer who played as a striker.

== Club career ==
Sodini won Serie A in 1999 with ACF Milan. She was the championship's second top scorer in 2009.

She played three matches for Juventus in the 2017–18 season and became an Italian champion.

== International career ==
Sodini was a member of the Italian national team, playing for them from 2002 to 2011.
