= ASD Riviera di Romagna Calcio Femminile =

Italian football club

Riviera di Romagna
- Full name: Associazione Sportiva Dilettantistica Riviera di Romagna Calcio Femminile
- Founded: 2010
- Ground: Montaletto, Cervia
- Chairman: Enrico Buonocore
- League: N/A
- 2015–16: Serie A, 11th (relegated)
- Website: http://www.rivieradiromagnacalcio.it
Home colours

Associazione Sportiva Dilettantistica Riviera di Romagna Calcio Femminile is an Italian women's football club from Cervia. The club had participated in Serie A, but withdrew from the league in 2016. It was established in 2010 from the merge of second-tier clubs Dinamo Ravenna and Cervia CF, and it was promoted one year later. In its Serie A debut it was tenth.

== History ==
In 2015 it was relegated to Serie B after four season in the top tier. However, the team was a repêchage of 2015–16 Serie A season. In 2016 the team was relegated again. At the start of 2016–17 season, the club withdrew the first team from the league system.

== Season by season ==
| | 10–11 | 11–12 | 12–13 | 13–14 | 14–15 |
|---|---|---|---|---|---|
| League | 1 (B) | 10 | 6 | 6 | 8 |
| Cup | R2 | 1/8 | R2 | 1/8 | 1/4 |
UEFA

== Players ==
=== Notable former players ===
Those former Riviera di Romagna players had represented their countries in international level:

- Italy: Michela Greco, Simona Sodini, Martina Piemonte
- Portugal: Raquel Infante, Carolina Mendes
- Romania: Monika Sinka
