= Roma CF =

Association football club in Bermuda

- Full name: Società Sportiva Dilettantistica Roma Calcio Femminile
- Nickname(s): La Magica, Giallorosse
- Founded: 1965; 60 years ago
- Stadium: Centro Sportivo Certosa
- League: Serie C
- 2021–22: Serie B: 14th (relegated)
- Website: https://www.romacalciofemminile.it/blog/

Società Sportiva Dilettantistica Roma Calcio Femminile, commonly referred to as Roma CF is an Italian women's football team based in Rome that competes in the Serie C.

== History ==
The club was founded in 1965 as A.C.F. Roma Lido by Mira Rosi Bellei, with the support of the A.S. Roma's president Franco Evangelisti, who ensured the team was provided with supplies such as footballs and other equipment. The club won the 1969 Serie A and the 1971 Coppa Italia.
