= ASD Calcio Chiasiellis =

Italian football team

Calcio Chiasiellis
- Full name: Associazione Sportiva Dilettantistica Calcio Chiasiellis
- Founded: 1982
- Ground: Communale de Mortegliano, Chiasiellis
- Chairman: Andrea Grizzo
- Manager: Fabio Franti
- League: Serie A
- 2010-11: 7th
- Website: http://www.calciochiasiellis.it
Home colours	Away colours

Associazione Sportiva Dilettantistica Calcio Chiasiellis, more commonly known simply as Calcio Chiasiellis, was an Italian women's football team from Chiasiellis, Italy.

Founded in 1982, it reached Serie A in 2007. Chiasiellis tightly avoided relegation in its debut in the top category and subsequently improved with two 8th spots. In 2011 the team ended 7th, their best-ever performance.
