= ASD Women Torres Calcio =

Italian football club

Torres
- Full name: Associazione Sportiva Dilettantistica Women Torres Calcio
- Nickname: I Rossoblù (The Red-Blues)
- Founded: 1980; 46 years ago (as A.C.F. Delco Costruzioni)
- Ground: Stadio Basilio Canu, Sennori
- Capacity: 1,500
- Chairman: Andrea Budroni
- League: Serie C
| Home colours | Away colours |

Associazione Sportiva Dilettantistica Women Torres Calcio, or simply Torres, is an Italian women's football club based in Sassari, Sardinia. The club was formed in 1980 and competed in Serie A until 2015. Torres's colours were blue and red. The team won seven league titles and eight Italian Women's Cups.

After winning two doubles in 2000 and 2001, Torres became the first team to represent Italy in the newly founded UEFA Women's Cup. After 2009–10 the team was a regular competitor in the rebranded UEFA Women's Champions League, reaching the quarter-finals on three occasions.

== History ==
=== Beginnings ===
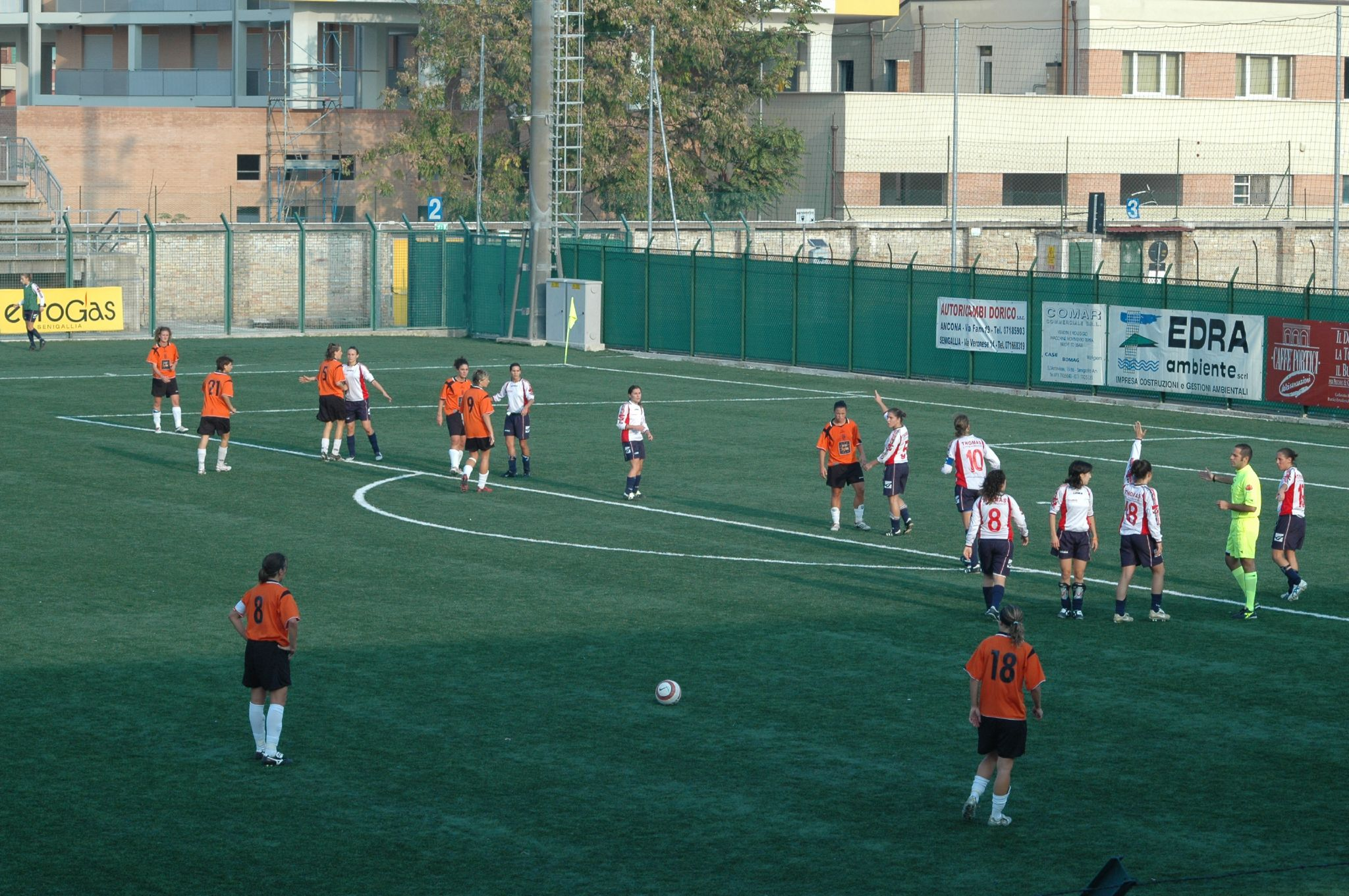
Sporting an orange change strip in October 2006

The club was founded in 1980 as A.C.F. Delco Costruzioni of Sassari and affiliated to the Federazione Italiana Calcio Femminile (FIGCF; Italy's autonomous women's football association). They began playing in the 1981 season, enrolling in the local division of Serie C.

In 1989, by then known as CUS Sassari, the team won the Sardinian section of Serie C and promotion to Serie B. The next season the club won its league again and arrived in Serie A for the first time. In the club's first season at the top level, 1990–91, the team won their first Italian Women's Cup. In 1993–94 the goals of Carolina Morace secured a first Scudetto. The following season, without Morace, the title was lost but the team won their second Italian Cup.

=== Early trophies ===
Between 1999 and 2005, Torres won two league titles, four Italian Cups, two Italian Super Cups and the Italy Women's Cup, as well as establishing the record of 38 consecutive wins in official matches including league and Italian Cup. Torres was the first Italian team to participate in the UEFA Women's Cup, the female version of the UEFA Champions League.

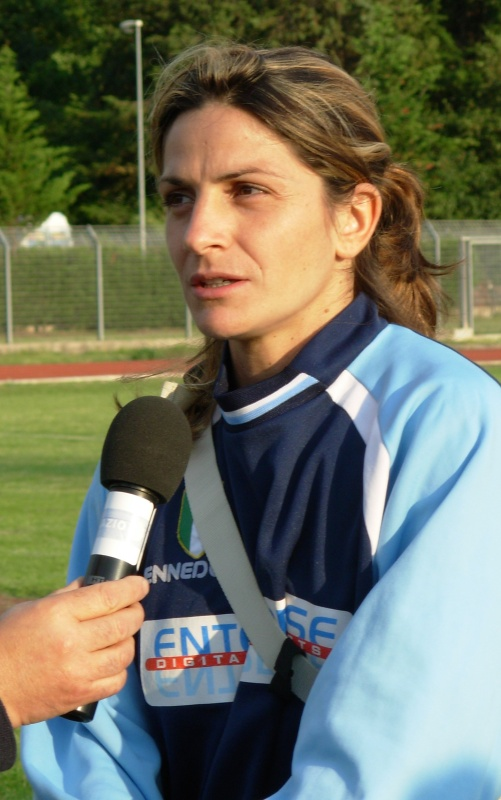
Patrizia Panico, Top Scorer of UEFA Women's Champions League in the season 2012–13 and Serie A in 2010–11 and in 2011–12

In 2008, after finishing second in the league, Torres won a seventh Italian Women's Cup by beating Bardolino 1–0 in the final's second leg, overturning a 3–2 defeat in the first leg. Throughout this period, Torres' success rested on the prolific goal-scoring of players such as Rita Guarino, Pamela Conti and the Spaniard Ángeles Parejo.

=== Burgeoning success ===
In the 2009–10 season Torres won a fourth Scudetto, dominating the league from the first day. The club also secured the Super Cup, but were beaten in the final of the Italian Women's Cup. A successful season was crowned by an appearance in the UEFA Women's Champions League quarter-finals. 2010–11 culminated in a treble of the Super Cup, Scudetto and Italian Women's Cup. In the following season, Torres collected a Scudetto and Super Cup double, but lost out in the semi-finals of the Italian Women's Cup. In 2013 they retained the league title and were named fifth in the year's best women's clubs by the International Federation of Football History & Statistics (IFFHS).

The 2013–14 season yielded a Super Cup and runners-up finishes in the league and Italian Women's Cup, as well as another quarter-final placing in the UEFA Women's Champions League. Patrizia Panico scored more than 40 league goals. But Torres were thrashed 12–1 on aggregate by Turbine Potsdam and overall the season was considered to be below expectations. A dispute over funding and the club's strategic direction saw the departure of both president Leonardo Marras and coach Manuela Tesse in 2014.

=== Insolvency and Promotion ===
Torres were subsumed into the structure of Torres' male club in June 2014. In September 2015 it was announced that Torres had been refused a license for the forthcoming Serie A season and would be excluded from taking part. La Lega Nazionale Dilettanti, who oversee women's football in Italy, demanded that the club's new owners pay half of the total €90,000 debt up front, rejecting a proposed alternative repayment arrangement which the male club offered to underwrite. In 2021 got promoted again Serie B, after the season 2020-21 in Serie C (level 3).

== Stadium ==
The team play in the Stadio Basilio Canu in Sennori.

== 2023–24 squad ==
As of 27 May 2024.

Note: Flags indicate national team as defined under FIFA eligibility rules; some limited exceptions apply. Players may hold more than one non-FIFA nationality.

| No. | Pos. | Nation | Player |
|---|---|---|---|
| 1 | GK | ITA | Francesca Fabiano |
| 2 | MF | ITA | Flavia Lombardo |
| 3 | DF | ITA | Valentina Congia |
| 4 | DF | ITA | Maria Bertone |
| 7 | FW | POR | Adriana Faria Gomes |
| 8 | MF | NED | Indy Spaan |
| 9 | FW | ITA | Giusy Bassano |
| 10 | DF | ITA | Maria Grazia Ladu |
| 12 | DF | IRL | Shauna Peare |
| 17 | DF | ESP | Catalina Alfonso Moran |
| 20 | FW | ITA | Lorenza Scarpelli |

| No. | Pos. | Nation | Player |
|---|---|---|---|
| 21 | MF | ITA | Francesca Blasoni |
| 22 | MF | ITA | Antonia Peddio |
| 32 | DF | NED | Milou Leendertse |
| 34 | DF | ITA | Beatrice Airola |
| 50 | GK | ITA | Miriam Ubaldi |
| 72 | GK | ITA | Marica Deiana |
| 77 | MF | ITA | Sofia Pederzani |
| 80 | MF | USA | Julia Saveria Weithofer |
| — | MF | ITA | Angela Congia |

=== Former players ===
For details of current and former players, see Category:Torres Calcio Femminile players.

== Record in UEFA competitions ==
| Competition | Round | Country | Club | Result |
|---|---|---|---|---|
| 2001–02 UEFA Women's Cup | Group stage | (Finland) | HJK Helsinki | 1–2 |
| 2001–02 UEFA Women's Cup | Group stage | (Austria) | USC Country House | 5–0 |
| 2001–02 UEFA Women's Cup | Group stage | (Faroe Islands) | KÍ Klaksvík | 4–0 |
| 2009–10 UEFA Women's Champions League | Group stage | (Slovakia) | Slovan Duslo Šaľa | 1–0 |
| 2009–10 UEFA Women's Champions League | Group stage | (Turkey) | Trabzonspor | 9–0 |
| 2009–10 UEFA Women's Champions League | Group stage | (Slovenia) | ŽNK Krka | 3–0 |
| 2009–10 UEFA Women's Champions League | Round of 32 | (Iceland) | Valur | 6–2 (4–1 h, 2–1 a) |
| 2009–10 UEFA Women's Champions League | Round of 16 | (Austria) | SV Neulengbach | 8–2 (4–1 h, 4–1 a) |
| 2009–10 UEFA Women's Champions League | Quarter finals | (France) | Olympique Lyonnais | 1–3 (0–3 a, 1–0 h) |
| 2010–11 UEFA Women's Champions League | Round of 32 | (Switzerland) | FC Zürich | 7–3 (3–2 a, 4–1 h) |
| 2010–11 UEFA Women's Champions League | Round of 16 | (France) | FCF Juvisy | 3–4 (1–2 h, 2–2 a aet) |
| 2011–12 UEFA Women's Champions League | Round of 32 | (Israel) | ASA Tel Aviv University | 5–2 (2–0 a, 3–2 h) |
| 2011–12 UEFA Women's Champions League | Round of 16 | (Denmark) | Brøndby IF | 2–5 (1–2 a, 1–3 h) |
| 2012–13 UEFA Women's Champions League | Round of 32 | (Cyprus) | Apollon Limassol | 6–3 (3–2 a, 3–1 h) |
| 2012–13 UEFA Women's Champions League | Round of 16 | (Romania) | CFF Olimpia Cluj | 7–1 (4–1 h, 3–0 a) |
| 2012–13 UEFA Women's Champions League | Quarter finals | (England) | Arsenal | 1–4 (1–3 a, 0–1 h) |
| 2013–14 UEFA Women's Champions League | Round of 32 | (Austria) | Spratzern | 5–3 (2–2 a, 3–1 h) |
| 2013–14 UEFA Women's Champions League | Round of 16 | (Russia) | Rossiyanka | 2–1 (0–1 a, 2–0 h) |
| 2013–14 UEFA Women's Champions League | Quarter finals | (Germany) | Turbine Potsdam | 1–12 (0–8 h, 1–4 a) |
| 2014–15 UEFA Women's Champions League | Round of 32 | (Slovenia) | Pomurje | 7–3 (4–2 a, 3–1 h) |
| 2014–15 UEFA Women's Champions League | Round of 16 | (Germany) | Frankfurt | 0–9 (0–5 a, 0–4 h) |

== Honours ==
Torres have won the most trophies of all Italian women's clubs.

=== League ===
- Serie A (level 1)
  - Winners (7): 1993–94, 1999–00, 2000–01, 2009–10, 2010–11, 2011–12, 2012–13
- Serie B (level 2)
  - Winners (1): 1989–90
- Serie C (level 3)
  - Winners (1): 2020-21

=== Cups ===
- Coppa Italia
  - Winners (8): 1990–91, 1994–95, 1999–00, 2000–01, 2003–04, 2004–05, 2007–08, 2010–11
  - Runners-up (3) 2008–09, 2009–10, 2013–14
- Supercoppa Italiana
  - Winners (7): 2000, 2004, 2009, 2010, 2011, 2012, 2013
- Italy Women's Cup
  - Winners (2): 2004, 2008
  - Runners-up (1) 2005,

=== Individual Player & Coach awards ===
Top Scorer

- (Italy) Patrizia Panico UEFA Women's Champions League: 2012–13 (8 goals)
- (Italy) Patrizia Panico Serie A: 2013–14 (43goals)
- (Italy) Patrizia Panico Serie A: 2012–13 (35 goals)
- (Italy) Patrizia Panico Serie A: 2011–12 (26 goals)
- (Italy) Patrizia Panico Serie A: 2010–11 (29 goals)
- (Italy) Carolina Morace Serie A: 1993–94 (33 goals)

== League and cup history ==
| Season | Div. | Pos. | Pl. | W | D | L | GS | GA | P | Domestic Cup | Other | Notes |
|---|---|---|---|---|---|---|---|---|---|---|---|---|
| 2021–22 | Serie B | 5/14 | 26 | 13 | 3 | 10 | 35 | 37 | 42 | | | |

== Gallery ==
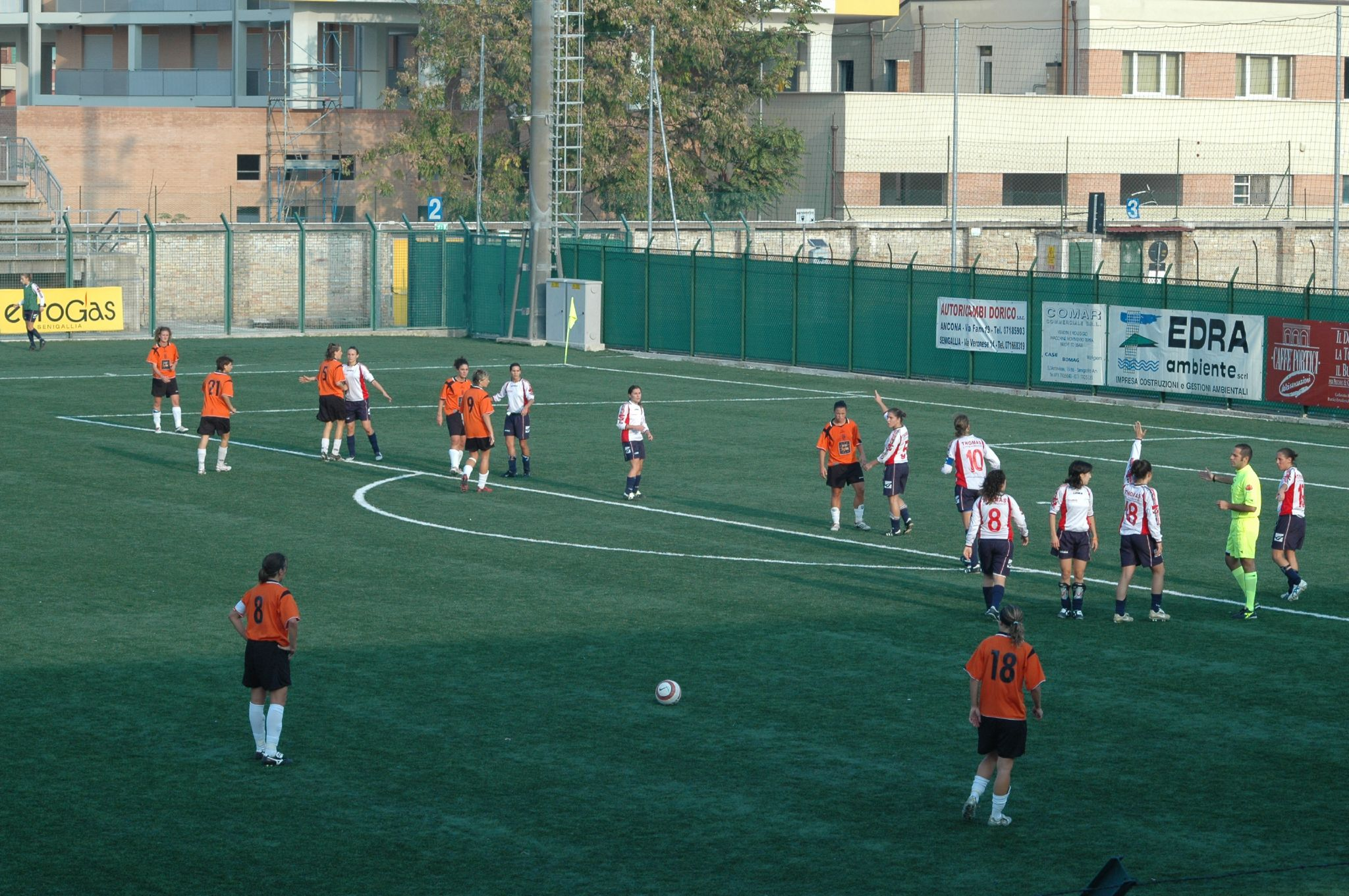
Sporting an orange change strip in October 2006

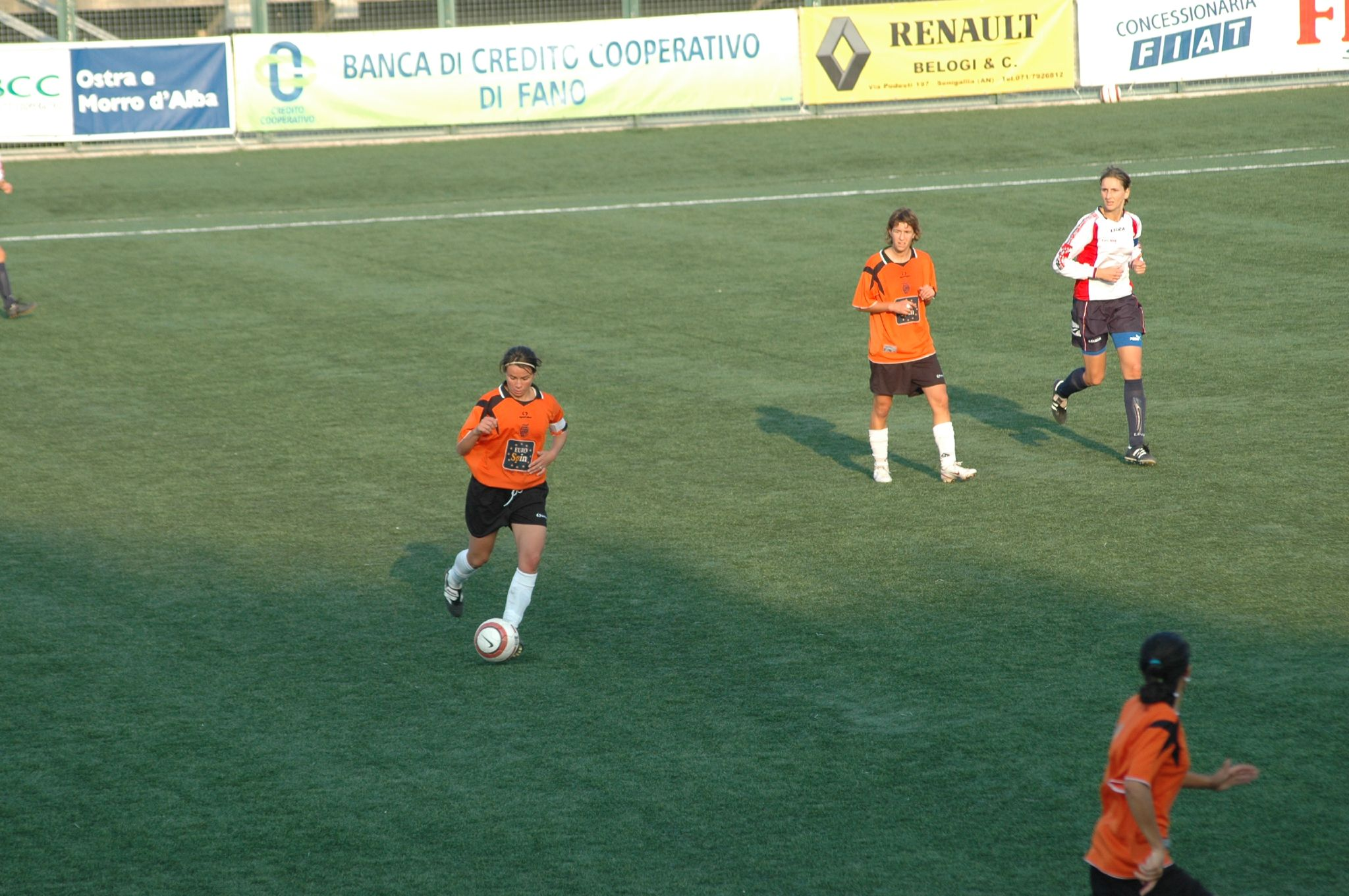

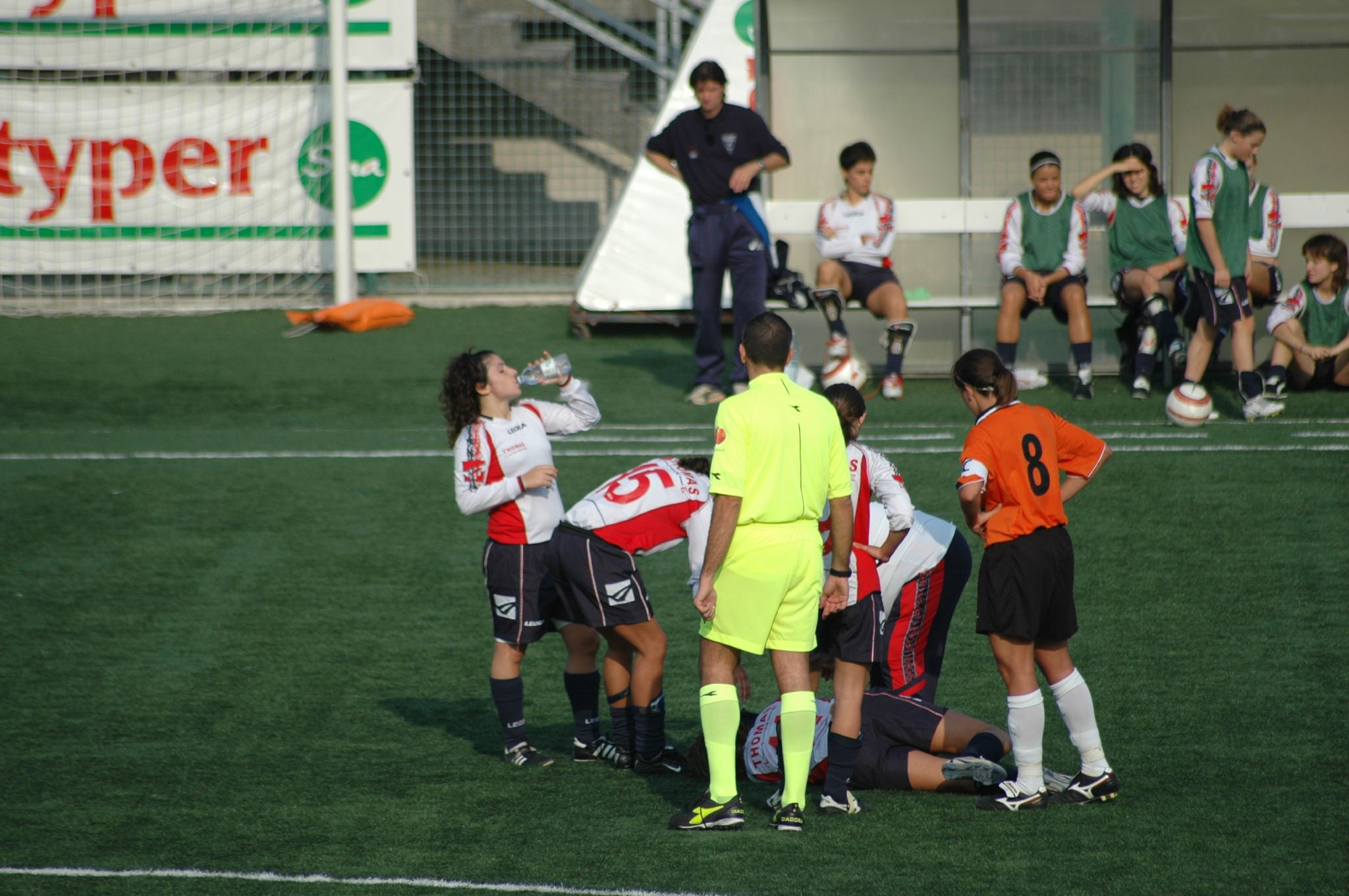

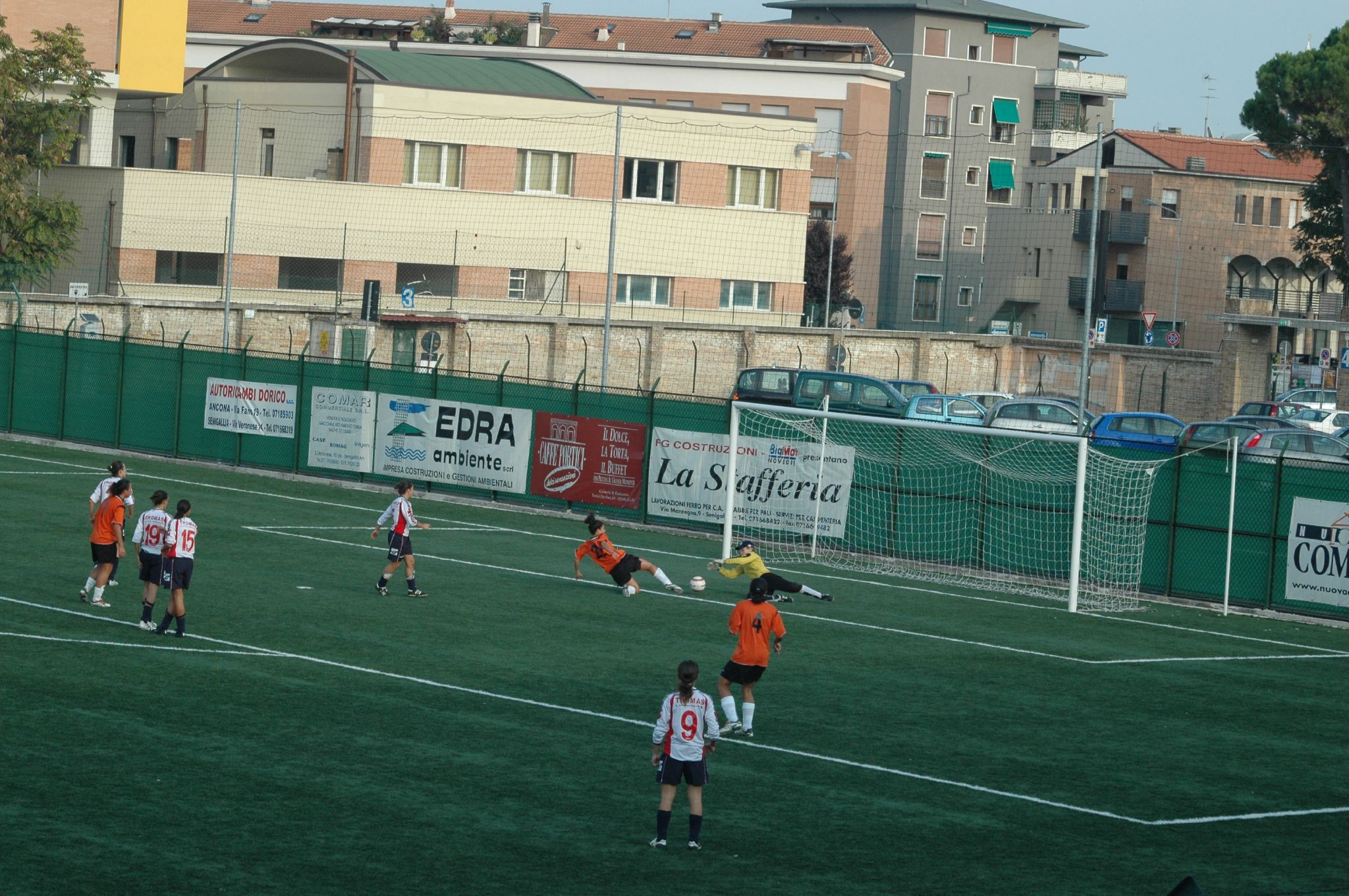

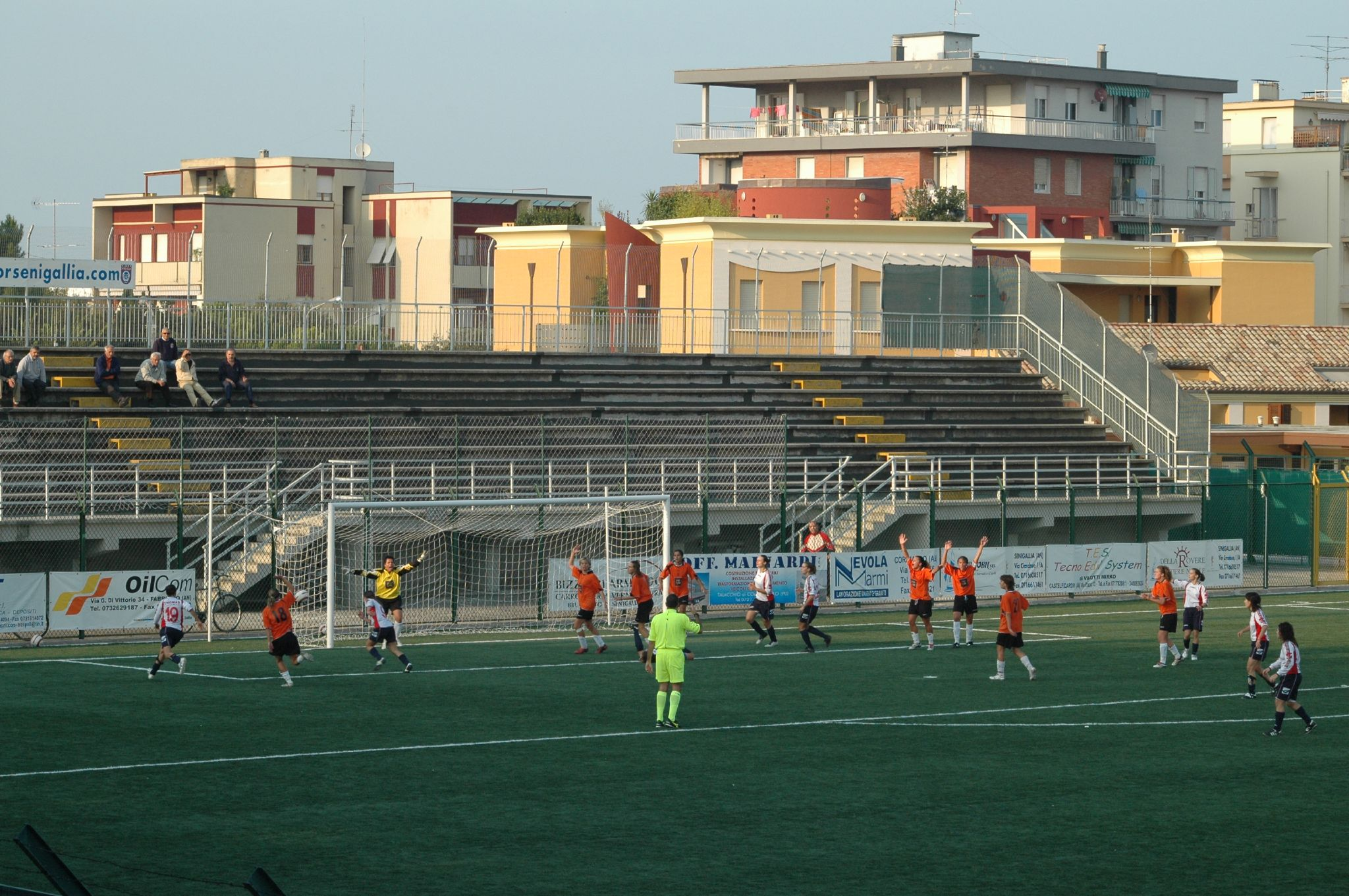

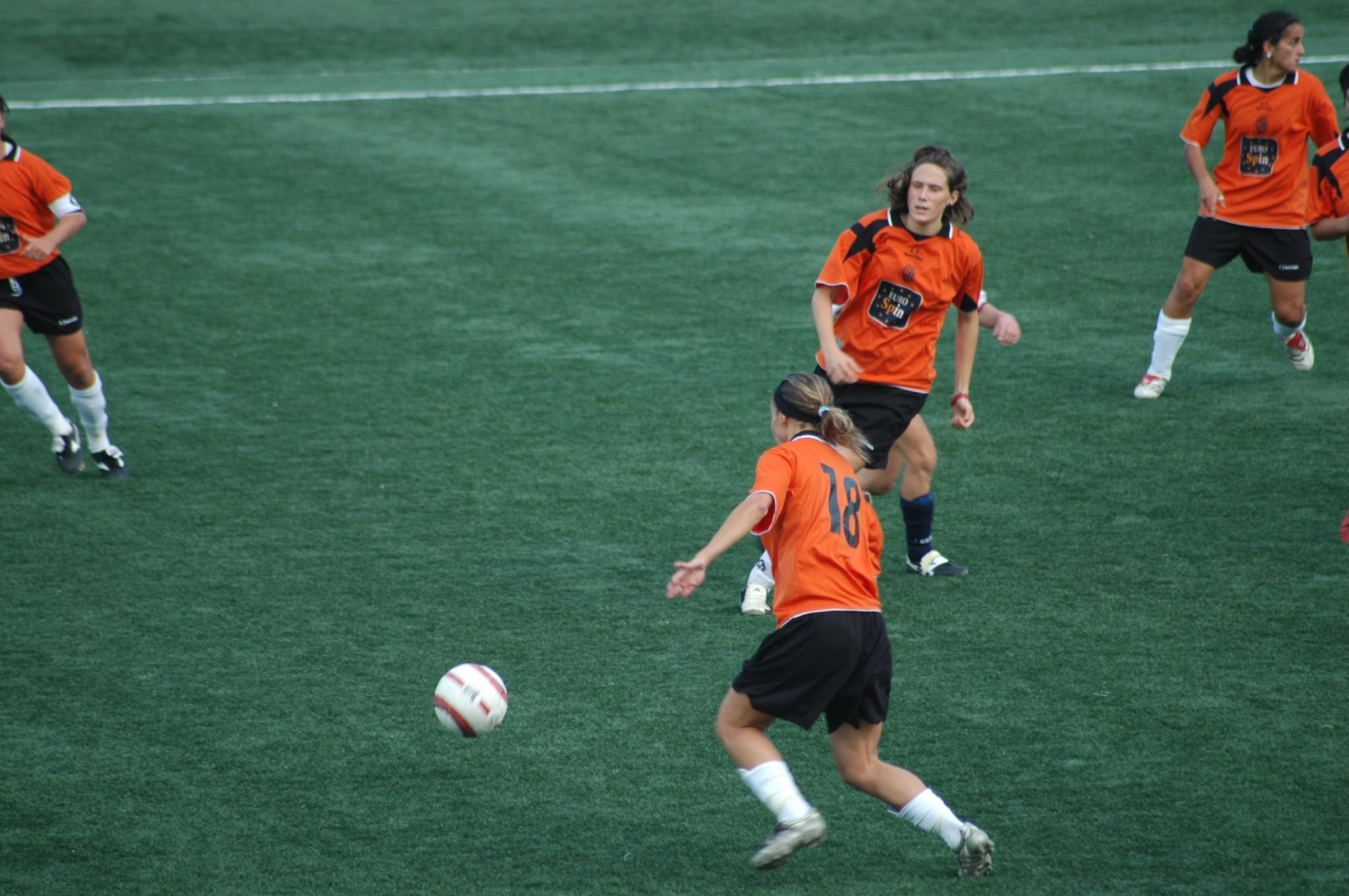

== See also ==
- S.E.F. Torres 1903
- U.S.D. Latte Dolce
- Dinamo Basket Sassari
