= ACF Firenze =

Italian football team

Firenze
- Full name: Associazione Calcio Femminile Firenze A.S.D.
- Founded: 1979
- Ground: Florence, Italy
- Chairman: Luciano Ciampo
Home colours	Away colours

Associazione Calcio Femminile Firenze A.S.D. was an Italian women's football team from Florence.

Founded in 1979 as Polisportiva Firenze Oltrano, it took its current name in 1983. The following year the team attained promotion to Serie A for the first time. In 1993 Firenze achieved its best result, a 3rd position, but it subsequently had to register in the 3rd tier for financial reasons.

Firenze returned to Serie A in 2006. It subsequently was relegated in 2008 and promoted in 2010. In 2011 it was 11th, two points from relegation.

ACF Firenze gave their place in Serie A to ACF Fiorentina (women), the new women's team of ACF Fiorentina in 2015.

ACF Firenze continued to participate at youth level. ACF Firenze and Fiorentina Women had a derby in 2016.
