= Atalanta Mozzanica Calcio Femminile Dilettantistico =

Italian football club

Atalanta Mozzanica
- Mozzanica Calcio Femminile logo
- Full name: Atalanta Mozzanica Calcio Femminile Dilettantistico
- Founded: 2002
- Dissolved: 2019
- Ground: Stadio Comunale di Mozzanica
- Capacity: 500
- Chairman: Ilaria Sarsilli
- Manager: Elio Garavaglia
- League: Serie A
- 2018–19: 5th
- Website: http://www.asdmozzanica.it
Home colours	Away colours

Atalanta Mozzanica Calcio Femminile Dilettantistico, previously known as A.S.D. Mozzanica or Mozzanica Calcio Femminile, was an Italian women's football club from Mozzanica, in the Province of Bergamo.

The club was founded in 2002 in Mozzanica as A.S. Or. Mozzanica. On 22 September 2017 the club signed a sponsorship deal with Atalanta Bergamasca Calcio, which the club would use both the logos of Atalanta B.C. and A.S.D. Mozzanica on the shirt, as well as adding Atalanta to the denomination.

The club was dissolved in July 2019.

== Name changes ==
- 2002 – A.S. Oratorio Mozzanica
- 2004 – F.C.F. Mozzanica
- 2007 – A.S.D. Mozzanica (under a merge with A.C.F. Aurora Bergamo)
- 2017 – Atalanta Mozzanica Calcio Femminile Dilettantistico

== Stadium ==
The team used Centro sportivo Comunale Campo 1 (lit. municipal sport centre field 1) as their home stadium, also known as Stadio Comunale di Mozzanica.

== See also ==
- List of women's association football clubs
