= ASD UPC Tavagnacco =

Italian football club

Tavagnacco
- Full name: Associazione Sportiva Dilettantistica Unione Polisportiva Comunale Tavagnacco
- Founded: 1989
- Ground: Stadio Comunale Tavagnacco
- Capacity: 1.000
- Chairman: Roberto Moroso
- Coach: Chiara Orlando
- League: Serie B
- 2021–22: 9th, Serie B
- Website: http://www.upctavagnacco.com/
Home colours	Away colours

Associazione Sportiva Dilettantistica Unione Polisportiva Comunale Tavagnacco, also known as Graphistudio Tavagnacco for sponsorship reasons, is an Italian women's football club from Tavagnacco, Friuli-Venezia Giulia.

== History ==
Founded in 1989, by 2001 UPC Tavagnacco reached the Serie A, where it has played since. After struggling to avoid relegation in its first years in Serie A, the club has joined the championship's elite in recent years, ranking between the 2nd and 6th positions since 2007. In 2011 Tavagnacco was league runner up and it also reached the Italian Women's Cup final, which it lost 0–3 to Torres Calcio. It consequently qualified for the first time for the UEFA Champions League, where it was defeated in the Round of 32 by Swedish champion LdB Malmö.

== Honours ==
- Serie A
  - Runner-up: 2011, 2013
- Coppa Italia
  - Winner: 2012/13, 2013/14

=== Overall competition record ===
Season	Division	Place	Coppa	UEFA
1997–98	3	?		
1998–99	2 (Gr. B)	6th		
1999–00	2 (Gr. B)	8th	Round 2	
2000–01	2 (Gr. B)	1st	Round 2	
2001–02	1	11th		
2002–03	1	11th		
2003–04	1	12th	Quarterfinals	
2004–05	1	10th	Round of 16	
2005–06	1	9th	Semifinals	
2006–07	1	7th	Round 2	
2007–08	1	4th	Quarterfinals	
2008–09	1	3rd	Round 1	
2009–10	1	3rd	Semifinals	
2010–11	1	2nd	Finalist	
2011–12	1	3rd	Semifinals	Round of 32
2012–13	1	2nd	Winner	
2013–14	1	3rd	Winner	Round of 32
2014–15	1	6th	Finalist	
2015–16	1	5th	Quarter-final	
2016–17	1	6th	Semi-final	

=== UEFA competition record ===
Season	Competition	Stage	Opponent	Result	Scorers
2011–12	Champions League	Round of 32	(Sweden) LdB Malmö	2–1 (h) 0–5 (a)	Camporese, Riboldi
2013–14	Champions League	Round of 32	(Denmark) Fortuna Hjørring	3–2 (h) 0–2 (a)	Camporese, Tuttino, Zuliani

== Current squad ==
As of 1 September 2019

Note: Flags indicate national team as defined under FIFA eligibility rules; some limited exceptions apply. Players may hold more than one non-FIFA nationality.

No.	Pos.	Nation	Player
2	DF	ITA	Valeria Gardel
3	DF	ITA	Elisa Donda
5	DF	ITA	Federica Veritti
6	FW	CHN	Jade Zhou
8	MF	ITA	Francesca Blasoni
11	DF	ITA	Erika Covalero
12	GK	ITA	Costanza Nicola
13	FW	ITA	Caterina Ferin
14	DF	ITA	Chiara Cecotti

No.	Pos.	Nation	Player
15	MF	ITA	Benedetta Brignoli
16	MF	ITA	Valentina Puglisi
18	DF	JPN	Mizuho Kato
19	DF	ITA	Eleonora Pozzecco
20	DF	ITA	Gaia Milan
22	GK	ITA	Marika Fontana
24	DF	ITA	Francesca Molinaro
32	DF	ITA	Teresa Gallo
—	DF	AUT	Nike Winter

=== Former players ===
For details of current and former players, see Category:ASD UPC Tavagnacco players.

=== Staff ===
Management:

- Chairman: Roberto Moroso
- Sports director: Glauco Di Benedetto
- Secretary: Paolo Foschiani
- Marketing director: Luigi Gressani

Sports:

- Head coach: Sergio Tomadini
- Assistant coach: Marco Rossi
- Goalkeeper coach: Alessandro Pinat

Medical:

- Physio: Sara Pozzetto
