= Coppa Italia (women) =

National women's football cup competition

Coppa Italia Women
- Organiser(s): FIGC
- Founded: 1971; 55 years ago
- Region: Italy
- Teams: 26
- Current champions: Roma (3rd title)
- Most championships: Torres (8 titles)
- Broadcaster(s): Sky Sport; RAI; DAZN
- 2026–27 Coppa Italia Women

The Coppa Italia Women is the national women's football cup competition in Italy and was first held in 1971.

== Format ==
Coppa Italia is open to teams competing in Serie A (10 teams) and Serie B (16 teams) for a total of 26 participants. The teams are ordered based on their final league position in the previous season, with Serie A teams first followed by Serie B, and the team(s) promoted to Serie A above the team(s) relegated to Serie B. The order is used to arrange the teams into three pools of unequal sizes: 8, 14 and 4.

The tournament itself consists of five rounds plus a preliminary round. The last four teams participate in the preliminary round to compete in a single-leg knock-out with a predetermined match-up (23rd vs 26th and 24th vs 25th) for two spots in round 1. The middle 14 teams and the two winners of the preliminary round compete in round 1, consisting again of single-leg matches. In round 2, the 8 winners of round 1 meet the first 8 teams in single-leg matches to determine the quarter-finalists. The quarter- and semi-finals use a two-leg system, with home and away rounds, while the final is once again a single-leg match held on neutral ground.

== List of finals ==
Year	Winners	Result	Runners-up
1971 (Note: Match played 9 January 1972 in Rome. Austrian Monika Karner scored the goal from Sue Lopez's pass.)	Roma	1–0	Fiorentina
1972	Falchi Crescentinese	4–1	Lazio Lubiam
1973	Falchi Astro	2–1	Lazio Lubiam
1974 (Note: All data (1974 to date) stored in paper reports at Fiammamonza's club headquarter.)	Gamma 3 Padova	0–0 aet (6–5 pen.)	Lazio Lubiam
1975	Milan	2–0	Sisal Moquettes Piacenza
1976	G.B.C. Milan	3–1	Valdobbiadene
1977	Lazio 1975 Lubiam	1–1 aet (4–3 pen.)	G.B.C. Milan
1978	Conegliano	4–1	Lazio 1975 Lubiam
1979	Conegliano	1–0	Lazio 1975 Lubiam
1980	Gorgonzola	1–0	Alaska Gelati Lecce
1981	Alaska Gelati Lecce	2–0	Verona
1982	Alaska Gelati Lecce	4–0	Giolli Gelati Roma
1983	Marmi Trani 80	1–1 aet (6–5 pen.)	Tigullio 72
1984	Not played		
1985	R.O.I. Lazio	1–0	Sanitas Trani 80
1985–86	Modena Euromobil	0–0 aet (5–4 pen.)	R.O.I. Lazio
1986–87	Not played (Note: When previous FIGCF federation merged into FIGC, the 1986–87 edition was expected to start on 14 September 1986 with just 7 groups of 4 teams due to several withdrawals. Later on the cup was suspended because seasonal fixtures were plenty and the previous season's Serie A (ended on 7 July 1986) was unable to grant playable dates.)		
1987–88	Modena Euromobil	2–1	Trani 80 B.K.V.
1988–89 (Note: Editions 1988/89 to 1998/99 had been published by "Annuario del calcio femminile 1999-2000" - Mariposa Editrice in Fornacette (Pisa), compiled by Luca Barboni and Gabriele Cecchi, November 1999.)	G.B. Campania	2–2 aet (6–5 pen.)	Reggiana Zambelli
1989–90	G.B. Campania	2–1	Milan 82
1990–91	Woman Sassari	0–0 aet (5–4 pen.)	Fiammamonza
1991–92	Reggiana Zambelli	5–1	Fiammamonza
1992–93	Reggiana Zambelli	3–0	Napoli
1993–94	G.E.A.S. Sesto San Giovanni	0–0 aet (4-2 pen.)	Agliana Imbalpaper
1994–95	Torres Fo.S.	1–1 home 2–1 away	Agliana
1995–96	Lugo	5–0 home 3–1 away	Fiammamonza
1996–97	Agliana	1–0 home 1–2 away	Univer Torino
1997–98	ACF Milan	3–1	Lugo
1998–99	Lazio	4–2	ACF Milan
1999–2000	Torres Fo.S.	2–0	ACF Milan
2000–01	Torres Fo.S.	1–0	Bardolino
2001–02	Foroni Verona	1–0	Ruco Line Lazio
2002–03	Enterprise Lazio	5–0	Fiammamonza
2003–04	Torres Terra Sarda	6–0	Foroni Verona
2004–05	Torres Terra Sarda	2–0	Vigor Senigallia
2005–06	Bardolino Verona	4–1	Aircargo Agliana
2006–07	Bardolino Verona	3–1 home 1–3 away aet (2-3 pen.)	Torino
2007–08	Torres	2–3 away 1–0 home	Centropose Bardolino
2008–09	Bardolino Verona	2–0	Eurospin Torres
2009–10	Reggiana	1–1 aet (6–5 pen.)	Torres
2010–11	Torres	3–0	Graphistudio Tavagnacco
2011–12	Brescia	3–2 (a.e.t.)	Napoli
2012–13	Graphistudio Tavagnacco	2–0	Bardolino Verona
2013–14	Graphistudio Tavagnacco	3–2	Torres
2014–15	Brescia	4–0	Tavagnacco
2015–16	Brescia	2–1	Verona
2016–17	Fiorentina	2–1	Brescia
2017–18	Fiorentina	3–1	Brescia
2018–19	Juventus	2–1	Fiorentina
2019–20	Not concluded due to the COVID-19 pandemic		
2020–21	Roma	0–0 aet (3–1 pen.)	Milan
2021–22	Juventus	2–1	Roma
2022–23	Juventus	1–0	Roma
2023–24	Roma	3–3 aet (4–3 pen.)	Fiorentina
2024–25	Juventus	4–0	Roma
2025–26	Roma	1–0	Juventus

== See also ==
- Coppa Italia, men's edition

== Bibliography ==
- Lopez, Sue (1997). Women on the Ball: A Guide to Women's Football. London, England: Scarlet Press. ISBN 1857270169.
