= SSD Women Hellas Verona =

Italian football club

Hellas Verona Women
- Full name: Società Sportiva Dilettantistica Women Hellas Verona
- Nickname: Gialloblu (Yellow-Blues)
- Founded: 1995 (as S.S. Calcio Femminile Bardolino)
- Ground: Stadio Aldo Olivieri
- Capacity: 3,000
- President: Italo Zanzi
- Manager: Joan Moll
- League: Serie B
- 2025–26: Serie B, 12th of 14
- Website: hellasveronawomen.it
Home colours	Away colours

Hellas Verona Women, known as Hellas Verona or simply Verona, is a women's football club based in Verona, Italy, currently playing in Serie B.

Founded in 1995, the team won the Serie A championship five times and the Coppa Italia three times. They were previously known as A.S.D. Bardolino Verona C.F. between 2007 and 2013.

== History ==
In summer 2011 the club moved from their traditional home in Bardolino to Stadio Olivieri, a small venue in the grounds of Verona's main stadium, Stadio Marc'Antonio Bentegodi. In September 2013 they received dispensation from the Italian Football Federation (FIGC) to remove Bardolino from their official name, becoming AGSM Verona due to a sponsorship deal with AGSM Verona.

== Current squad ==
As of 4 August 2026

Note: Flags indicate national team as defined under FIFA eligibility rules; some limited exceptions apply. Players may hold more than one non-FIFA nationality.

No.	Pos.	Nation	Player
1	GK	ITA	Chiara Valzolgher
9	FW	ITA	Valentina Colombo
10	FW	ITA	Rachele Peretti (captain)
11	FW	ITA	Linda Montesi
13	DF	ITA	Elena Crespi
14	MF	ITA	Elisa Casellato
21	MF	ITA	Marica Licco

No.	Pos.	Nation	Player
28	DF	ITA	Marta Maffei
29	DF	ITA	Sara Corsi
30	GK	SVK	Sabína Rabčanová
—	MF	SVN	Sara Ketiš
—	DF	ITA	Alice Zaghini
—	MF	ITA	Benedetta De Biase
—	DF	ITA	Simona Zito
—	MF	ITA	Cristina Merli
—	FW	ITA	Benedetta Santoro (on loan from Inter Milan U19)
—	MF	GRE	Maria Vlassopoulou

== Former players ==
For details of former players, see Category:A.S.D. AGSM Verona F.C. players.

== Honours ==
- Serie A
  - Winners (5): 2004–05, 2006–07, 2007–08, 2008–09, 2014–15
- Coppa Italia
  - Winners (3): 2005–06, 2006–07, 2008–09

== Record in UEFA competitions ==
All results (home and away) list Verona's goal tally first.

Season	Competition	Stage	Result	Opponent
2005–06	UEFA Women's Cup	Qualifying Stage	3–0	(Croatia) Dinamo Maksimir
2005–06	UEFA Women's Cup	Qualifying Stage	2–0	(Republic of Ireland) University College Dublin
2005–06	UEFA Women's Cup	Qualifying Stage	0–0	(Austria) Neulengbach
2007–08	UEFA Women's Cup	Qualifying Stage	16–0	(Malta) Birkirkara
2007–08	UEFA Women's Cup	Qualifying Stage	5–0	(Slovenia) Krka Novo Mesto
2007–08	UEFA Women's Cup	Qualifying Stage	1–0	(Spain) Athletic Bilbao
2007–08	UEFA Women's Cup	Group Stage	3–2	(Austria) Neulengbach
2007–08	UEFA Women's Cup	Group Stage	5–1	(Kazakhstan) Almaty
2007–08	UEFA Women's Cup	Group Stage	3–3	(England) Arsenal
2007–08	UEFA Women's Cup	Quarter-finals	0–1, 1–0 (3–2p)	(Denmark) Brøndby
2007–08	UEFA Women's Cup	Semifinals	2–4, 0–3	(Germany) Frankfurt
2008–09	UEFA Women's Cup	Group Stage	2–1	(Kazakhstan) Almaty
2008–09	UEFA Women's Cup	Group Stage	3–2	(Iceland) Valur
2008–09	UEFA Women's Cup	Group Stage	0–4	(Sweden) Umeå
2008–09	UEFA Women's Cup	Quarter-finals	0–5, 1–4	(France) Olympique Lyon
2009–10	Champions League	Round of 32	0–4, 2–1	(Denmark) Fortuna Hjørring
2010–11	Champions League	Qualifying Stage	5–0	(Wales) Swansea City
2010–11	Champions League	Qualifying Stage	3–0	(Georgia (country)) Baia Zugdidi
2010–11	Champions League	Qualifying Stage	4–1	(Slovenia) Krka Novo Mesto
2010–11	Champions League	Round of 32	0–8, 1–6	(Denmark) Fortuna Hjørring
2012–13	Champions League	Round of 32	0–2, 3–0	(England) Birmingham City
2012–13	Champions League	Round of 16	0–1, 0–2	(Sweden) Malmö
2015–16	Champions League	Round of 32	5–4, 2–2	(Austria) St. Pölten-Spratzern
2015–16	Champions League	Round of 16	1–3, 1–5	(Sweden) Rosengård

== See also ==
- List of women's association football clubs
- List of women's football clubs in Italy
