= Anne O'Brien (footballer) =

Irish footballer and coach

Personal information
- Full name: Anne Monica O'Brien
- Date of birth: 25 January 1956
- Place of birth: Dublin, Ireland
- Date of death: 29 August 2016 (aged 60)
- Place of death: Fregene, Italy
- Height: 1.61 m (5 ft 3 1/2 in)
- Position: Midfielder

Youth career
- Inchicore Celtic

Senior career*
Years	Team	Apps	(Gls)
1970–1971	Julian Vards		
1972–1973	Ballyfermot All-Stars		
1973–1975	Stade de Reims		
1976–1983	Lazio		
1983–1984	Trani		
1984–1986	Lazio		
1986–1987	Modena Ritt Jeans		
1987–1988	Napoli		
1988–1989	Prato		
1989–1991	Reggiana Zambelli		
1991–1994	Milan Salvarani		

International career^{‡}
1973–1990	Republic of Ireland	4	

Managerial career
- 2005–2006: Lazio
- 2007–2008: Civitavecchia
- * Club domestic league appearances and goals as of 12:00, 1 April 2012 (UTC) ‡ National team caps and goals as of 12:00, 1 April 2012 (UTC)

Anne Monica O'Brien (25 January 1956 – 29 August 2016) was an Irish association football coach and player. A midfielder, she played for the Republic of Ireland women's national football team and was the first Irish female to play professional football outside of Ireland. She began her professional career in France, with Stade de Reims, then settled in Italy where she found success with Serie A teams including Lazio and Trani. After qualifying as a coach at the Coverciano centre, O'Brien worked for the Italian Football Federation (FIGC) and served Lazio as manager.

== Club career ==
O'Brien joined Stade de Reims at the age of 17, after the French club toured Dublin. She arrived in Italy in 1976, having won three league titles with Reims. O'Brien enjoyed similar success in Italy, collecting six Scudetti and two Italian Women's Cups in a career spanning seven clubs and 18 years.

Beginning at Lazio, O'Brien won the league in 1979 and 1980, as well as the Cup in 1977. After the League switched to a winter season, she helped Trani win the 1984 League. Returning to Lazio and playing alongside Pia Sundhage, she lifted the Cup again in 1985. Later in O'Brien's career she won three consecutive League titles; two with Reggiana (1989–90, 1990–91) and one with Milan Salvarani (1991–92).

The Dizionario del Calcio Italiano described O'Brien as an elegant midfield playmaker, adept at reading the game and capable of precise passing. She was bracketed alongside Rose Reilly, Conchi Sánchez and Susy Augustesen as one of the best foreigners to play women's football in Italy. In 2014 Italian football great Carolina Morace named O'Brien as one of the best players in the world and described her as an inspiration.

== International career ==
O'Brien endured a relatively inauspicious international career. Due to travel and accommodation costs, the poorly performing Irish national team only called her up for their most important fixtures after she had emigrated.

In October 1973, O'Brien played for Ireland against France at the Parc des Princes in Paris. Ireland were beaten 4–1 but O'Brien was named Player of the Match. O'Brien told Newstalk radio in August 2014 that she won about four caps but was never invited to play for Ireland while based in continental Europe. In April 1990, while visiting Dublin, she played in Ireland's 0–0 1991 UEFA Women's Championship qualification draw against the Netherlands.

== Personal life ==
O'Brien was from Inchicore, Dublin. In 1987 O'Brien spent a period out of football to give birth to her son, Andrea. Following her retirement from playing she settled in Rome. O'Brien remained in football, serving Lazio as manager in the mid-2000s (she trained Lazio in 2005-06 and Women Civitavecchia in 2007-08) and later working for the Italian Football Federation (FIGC) as a coach.

In 1999, her son, Andrea, was playing in A.S. Roma's youth team. O'Brien is reportedly a cousin of Johnny Giles and a more distant relative of Jimmy Conway. The League of Ireland footballer Ger O'Brien is Anne's nephew. She died on 29 August 2016 in Rome, Italy after a short illness.
