= Giorgia Brenzan =

Italian footballer (born 1967)

Personal information
- Full name: Giorgia Brenzan
- Date of birth: 21 August 1967 (age 59)
- Place of birth: Turin, Italy
- Height: 5 ft 8 in (1.73 m)
- Position: Goalkeeper

Senior career*
Years	Team	Apps	(Gls)
1984–1987	Juve Piemonte		
1987–1990	Modena Euromobil		
1990–1998	Sassari Torres		
1998–2000	ACF Milan		
2000–2002	Foroni Verona		

International career
1986–2002	Italy	90	(0)

Managerial career
- 2012: Italy U20
Medal record
Italy
UEFA Women's Championship
Silver medal – second place	Italy 1993
- * Club domestic league appearances and goals

Giorgia Brenzan (born 21 August 1967) is an Italian football coach and former goalkeeper. She was part of the Italy squad at the 1991 FIFA Women's World Cup and 1999 FIFA Women's World Cup. At club level she made over 700 appearances, collecting two women's Serie A winner's medals and four Coppa Italia winner's medals.

== International career ==
Brenzan won her first cap for the Italy women's national football team in March 1986, appearing as a 73rd-minute substitute for Eva Russo in a 2–2 friendly draw with the Netherlands in Ascoli Piceno.

At the 1991 FIFA Women's World Cup, Brenzan was back-up to Stefania Antonini as Italy reached the quarter-final and lost 3–2 to Norway after extra time. At UEFA Women's Euro 1993 hosts Italy reached the final and suffered another defeat by Norway, 1–0 this time. By then Brenzan had recaptured her starting position from Antonini, with whom she enjoyed a friendly rivalry for the national team goalkeeper position.
