= Elisabetta Bavagnoli =

Italian footballer and coach (born 1963)

Personal information
- Date of birth: 3 September 1963 (age 63)
- Place of birth: Piacenza, Italy
- Positions: Defender; midfielder

Senior career*
Years	Team	Apps	(Gls)
1978–1983	Piacenza		
1983–1985	Modena		
1985–1988	Lazio		
1988–1989	Modena		
1989–1990	Lazio		
1990–1991	Reggiana		
1991–1993	Milan '82		
1993–1994	Torres		
1994–1995	Agliana		
1995–1996	Verona		
1996–1997	Modena C.F.		
1997–1999	Lazio		

International career
1986–1997	Italy	80	(1)

Managerial career
- 1997–1998: Lazio
- 1998–1999: Lazio (assistant)
- 1999: Viterbese (men; assistant)
- 2000–2003: Italy (assistant)
- 2003–2004: Italy U19
- 2008–2009: Fiano Romano
- 2009–2011: Canada (assistant)
- 2018–2021: AS Roma Women (head coach)
- 2021–: AS Roma Women (Executive position)
- * Club domestic league appearances and goals

Elisabetta "Betty" Bavagnoli (born 3 September 1963) is an Italian football coach and former defender or midfielder. As a player, she represented the Italian women's national team and various clubs in women's Serie A.

== Club career ==
Bavagnoli broke into the team of hometown club Piacenza as a youngster. She stayed for five seasons until the club was dissolved in 1983. She moved on to Modena, then Lazio, where she won her first of seven league titles in 1987–88. At Lazio she also formed a friendship with Carolina Morace which would result in a long professional collaboration. Together with Morace, Bavagnoli played at Reggiana and Milan, leaving the latter in 1993–94 due to the club's financial difficulties. She moved to Torres, then continued her partnership with Morace at Aircargo Agliana, Günther Verona and back at Modena.

Retiring in 1999 at age 36, Bavagnoli finished her career with two seasons back at Lazio. In the first campaign she was player-coach, then she became player-assistant-coach under Morace who managed Lazio in 1998–99, having completed her own playing career. The team collected the 1999 Coppa Italia, beating ACF Milan 4–0 in the final.

== International career ==
Bavagnoli debuted for the Italian women's national team in May 1986, in a 1–0 win over Hungary in Potenza. She subsequently played in four editions of the UEFA Women's Championship as well as at the inaugural 1991 FIFA Women's World Cup. She was part of the team which finished second at UEFA Women's Euro 1993, the Azzurre's best achievement to date.

Bavagnoli won 80 caps for Italy, scoring one goal. (Note: The Italian Football Federation's (FIGC) official website reports 72 appearances and one goal, taking into account only matches played against national teams, not games against the "Rest of Europe" or those played in China against regional select teams such as Liaoning and Guangxi.) Her final appearance came in a 2–0 friendly win over England in April 1997.

== Playing style ==
During her playing career versatile Bavagnoli played in several different positions. Beginning as a right winger, she developed into a full back, then a lateral midfielder. She finished her playing days as a sweeper.

== Coaching career ==
Immediately after retirement, Bavagnoli joined the coaching staff of Carolina Morace, who had got a job as manager of men's third division club Viterbese. Defeat in the second league match of the 1999–00 season caused the team's unstable owner Luciano Gaucci to say he would replace Morace's staff. Morace resigned, followed by Bavagnoli a few days later.

In July 2000, Morace began coaching the Italian women's national team, with Bavagnoli as her assistant. They had responsibility for the senior and under-18 teams. In 2003 Bavagnoli assumed control of the Italian women's under-19 team and guided them to the 2004 FIFA U-19 Women's World Championship in Thailand.

She then returned to Lazio, as a technical director, alongside Antonello Belli. She worked with the female youth teams at Lodigiani and Fiano Romano, whose senior team she also coached in the 2008–09 season. From February 2009 to July 2011 she assisted Morace in coaching the Canada women's national soccer team, where they won the Cyprus Cup in 2010 and 2011 and the CONCACAF Women's Championship in 2010. Both left following Canada's disappointing 2011 World Cup campaign.

On 10 December 2012, Bavagnoli began attending Coverciano to study for her UEFA Pro Licence—the highest coaching qualification available. She was awarded the licence on 5 July 2013, the only woman who passed. Meanwhile, she had continued to work with Morace, in various ventures related to youth football. from the 2018 until the 2021 season, Bavagnoli coached AS Roma's female Serie A side to excellent results, thus resulting in her being promoted to director responsible of the female division during 2022.

== Coaching style ==
Bavagnoli sends her teams out in a traditional 4–4–2, but will sometimes depart from her favoured formation depending on the players at her disposal. She expects her players to pressure opponents high up the pitch.

== Personal life ==
In 1993 Bavagnoli was helping her parents run their perfumery. At that time she enjoyed writing poetry and playing the guitar.

== Honours ==
Lazio

- Serie A: 1987–88
- Coppa Italia: 1998–99

Reggiana

- Serie A: 1990–91

Milan '82

- Serie A: 1991–92

Torres

- Serie A: 1993–94

Agliana

- Serie A: 1994–95

Verona

- Serie A: 1995–96

Modena

- Serie A: 1996–97
