= Luana Pavan =

Italian footballer

Personal information
- Date of birth: 3 March 1963 (age 63)
- Place of birth: Treviso, Italy
- Position: Goalkeeper

Senior career*
Years	Team	Apps	(Gls)
1975–1981	Belluno		
1981–1986	Trani		
1987–1988	Somma Vesuviana		
1988–1990	GB Campania		
1998–1999	Lugo		

International career^{‡}
1982–1989	Italy	6	(0)
- * Club domestic league appearances and goals as of 14:28, 25 March 2018 (UTC) ‡ National team caps and goals as of 14:28, 25 March 2018 (UTC)

Luana Pavan (born 3 March 1963) is an Italian former footballer who played as a goalkeeper for the Italy women's national football team. At club level she collected four women's Serie A winner's medals and three Coppa Italia winner's medals.

== Club career ==
Pavan began her football career at Belluno, where she played alongside fellow promising youngster Carolina Morace. A tall goalkeeper with what the Dizionario del Calcio Italiano described as a "fisico da indossatrice" (transl. fashion model's physique), Pavan was an iconic member of the Trani team of the 1980s "golden era" of Italian women's football. She won three league titles and married the goalkeeper of Trani's men's team, but stopped playing during 1985–86 due to pregnancy.

In 1987–88 she returned to play for minnows Somma Vesuviana, but a mooted return to Trani failed to materialise when the Apulian giants folded at the end of the season. Instead Pavan linked up with Giugliano Campania, where she won a League and Cup double in 1988–89 and a Cup in 1990 before the club went bust upon the withdrawal of sponsors Gran Bazar. Pavan quit top level football and moved with her family to Abruzzo, where she played for local non-league teams in Vasto. She made a brief return to Serie A with Lugo in 1998–99.

== International career ==
With the Italy women's national football team, Pavan was a longstanding understudy to Eva Russo. She made her debut in August 1982 in a 2–1 home upset by Scotland and won the last of her six official caps as a substitute in a 1–1 friendly draw with England staged at Loakes Park, High Wycombe on 11 November 1989.

== Personal life ==
Pavan was married to Felice and had children Valentina and Alessandra. The demands of motherhood and her other career as a chemicals expert reduced her ability to keep playing football at the top level.

== Honours ==
=== Club ===
Trani

- Serie A (3): 1984, 1985, 1985–1986
- Coppa Italia (1): 1983

GB Campania

- Serie A (1): 1988–89
- Coppa Italia (1): 1988–89, 1989–90
