= Milena Bertolini =

Italian footballer and manager

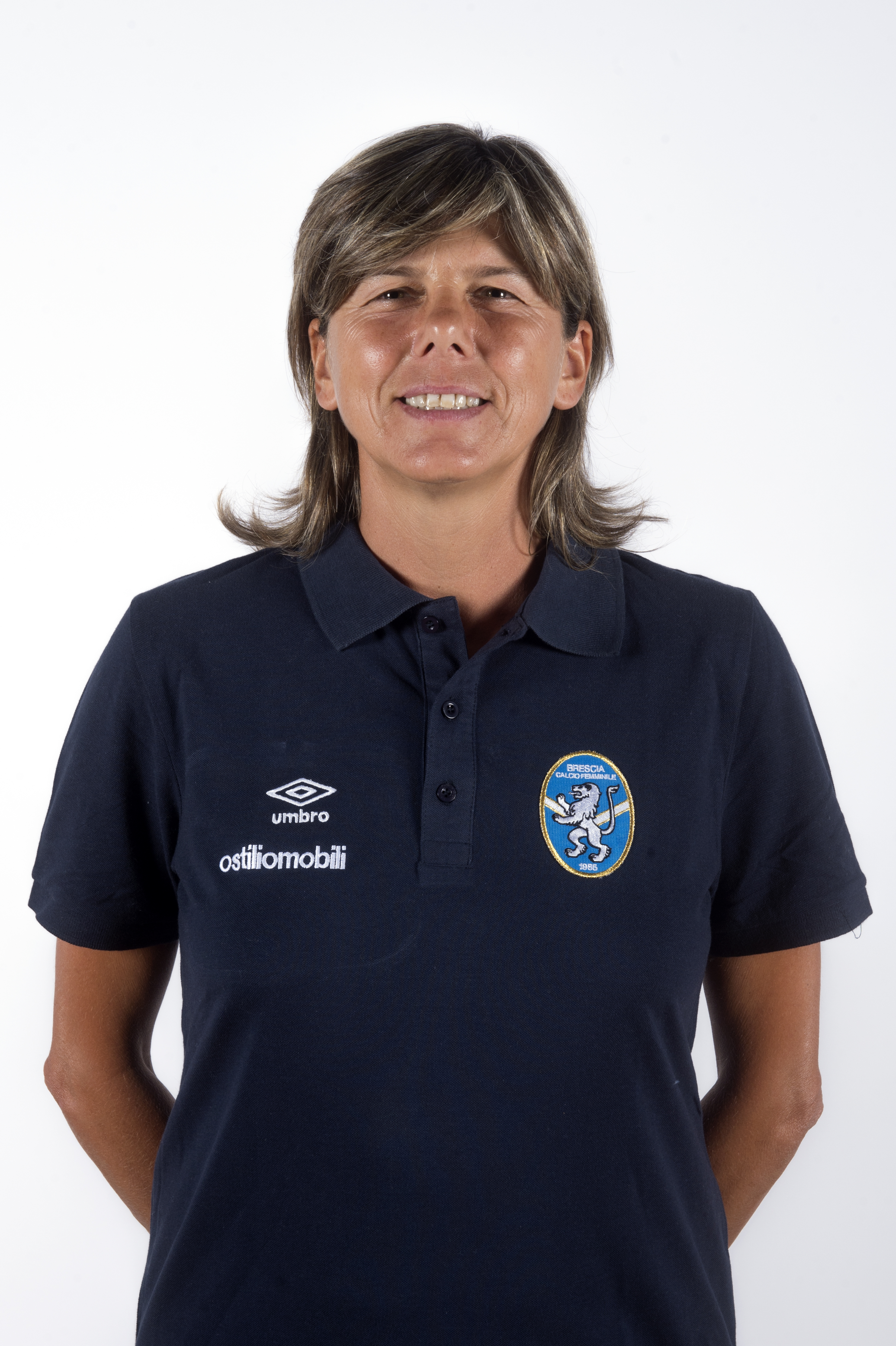
- Bertolini with Brescia in 2016

Personal information
- Full name: Milena Bertolini
- Date of birth: 24 June 1966 (age 60)
- Place of birth: Correggio, Italy
- Position: Defender

Youth career
- U.S. Correggese

Senior career*
Years	Team	Apps	(Gls)
1984–1987	Reggiana		
1987–1988	Modena Euromobil		
1989–1990	Prato		
1990–1991	Reggiana		
1991–1992	Woman Sassari	27	(1)
1992–1993	A.S.D. Bologna	28	(1)
1993–1994	Aircargo Agliana	29	(0)
1994–1996	Fiammamonza	46	(1)
1996–1998	Modena Femminile	44	(0)
1998–1999	Pisa S.C.F.	19	(0)
1999–2001	Foroni Verona	46	(1)
Total		239+	(4+)

International career
- Italy

Managerial career
- 2001–2002: Foroni Verona (assistant)
- 2002–2003: Foroni Verona
- 2004–2011: Reggiana
- 2012–2017: Brescia
- 2017–2023: Italy
- * Club domestic league appearances and goals

Milena Bertolini (born 24 June 1966) is an Italian former footballer and manager who last coached the Italy women's national team. As the national team coach, she led Italy to qualify for the 2019 FIFA Women's World Cup following a twenty-year absence.

== Playing career ==
Bertolini began her youth career with U.S. Correggese, before moving to Reggiana in 1984. The team won the Serie B title in the 1985–86 season, therefore earning promotion to Serie A. After spells at Modena Euromobil and Prato, she returned to Reggiana in 1990, helping the team to win the Serie A title. She later went on to play for Woman Sassari, A.S.D. Bologna, Aircargo Agliana and Fiammamonza. In 1996, she joined Modena Femminile, winning the league title in both her seasons at the club, along with the Supercoppa Italiana in 1997. In 1998, she joined Pisa S.C.F., before moving to Foroni Verona where she played until her retirement in 2001.

In 2018, she was the woman footballer inductee to the Italian Football Hall of Fame.

== Managerial career ==
Following her retirement in 2001, she became an assistant coach at Foroni Verona, the club she last played at, with the team winning the 2001–02 Coppa Italia. The following season, she was promoted as the team's head coach, leading them to Supercoppa Italiana and Serie A titles. In 2004, she returned to her former club Reggiana, winning the 2009–10 Coppa Italia during her tenure. In 2012, she joined Brescia, where she won two Serie A titles (2013–14 and 2015–16), two Coppa Italia titles (2014–15 and 2015–16) and three Supercoppa Italiana titles (2014, 2015 and 2016). During her managerial career in Serie A, she won the Panchina d'Oro award as the best manager of the season on six occasions (2008, 2009, 2010, 2014, 2015 and 2016).

At the end of the 2010–11 season, Bertolini obtained a UEFA Pro Licence, allowing her to coach a high level men's team.

In August 2017, she was appointed as the head coach of the Italy women's national team. In 2019 Women's World Cup qualification, she helped the team to win their qualifying group with only one loss, thus qualifying for the 2019 FIFA Women's World Cup in France. The tournament is Italy's third appearance at the Women's World Cup, and their first qualification after a twenty-year absence. She later led her country to both Euro 2022 and 2023 World Cup; however, Italy was eliminated from the group stages. On 7 August 2023, she announced her resignation from her post at the national team following the World Cup exit.

== Controversy ==
Bertolini was involved in a dispute in February 2022 by telling Nicolò Zaniolo to "reeducate" himself after he was sent-off for dissent. She later apologised for her vulgar speech.

== Honours ==
=== Player ===
Reggiana

- Serie A: 1990–91
- Coppa Italia: 1988–89
- Serie B: 1985–86

Modena

- Serie A: 1996–97, 1997–98
- Supercoppa Italiana: 1997

Individual

- Italian Football Hall of Fame, woman footballer: 2018

=== Manager ===
Foroni Verona

- Serie A: 2002–03
- Supercoppa Italiana: 2002

Reggiana

- Coppa Italia: 2009–10

Brescia

- Serie A: 2013–14, 2015–16
- Coppa Italia: 2014–15, 2015–16
- Supercoppa Italiana: 2014, 2015, 2016

Individual

- Panchina d'Oro of Serie A Femminile: 2007–08, 2008–09, 2009–10, 2013–14, 2014–15, 2015–16
