= 2018–19 Serie A (women) =

Serie A (women)
- Season: 2018–19
- Dates: 21 September 2018 – 20 April 2019
- Champions: Juventus (2nd title)
- Relegated: Pink Sport Time; Orobica
- Women's Champions League: Juventus; Fiorentina
- Matches: 132
- Goals: 448 (3.39 per match)
- Top goalscorer: Valentina Giacinti (21 goals)
- Biggest home win: Roma 7–1 Chievo (17 November 2018)
- Biggest away win: Pink Bari 0–6 Milan (22 September 2018)
- Highest scoring: Hellas Verona 9–3 Chievo (15 December 2018)
- All statistics correct as of 20 April 2019.

The 2018–19 Serie A (women) was the 52nd season of the women's football top level league in Italy. Juventus were the defending champions.

== Teams ==
Two teams finished at the bottom of the league and were relegated at the end of the 2017-18 season: Empoli and San Zaccaria.

Brescia, who finished second in Serie A last season, AGSM Verona who finished seventh and Res Roma who finished eighth, sold their licenses respectively to Milan, Hellas Verona and Roma.

=== Stadiums and locations ===
Locations of the 2018–19 Serie A teams

Team	Home city	Stadium	Capacity	2017–18 season
Atalanta Mozzanica	Mozzanica	Stadio Comunale di Mozzanica	500	5th in Serie A
Chievo	Verona	Stadio Aldo Olivieri	2,900	6th in Serie A
Fiorentina	Florence	Stadio Gino Bozzi	3,800	3rd in Serie A
Florentia	Sesto Fiorentino	Centro Sportivo "Ascanio Nesi" (Tavarnuzze)	?	1st in Serie B group A
Juventus	Turin	Juventus Center / Stadio Silvio Piola (Novara)	500 / 5,500	Serie A Champions
Milan	Milan	Centro sportivo Vismara	?	Brescia's license
Orobica	Stezzano	Centro Sportivo "Facchetti" (Cologno al Serio)	2,800	1st in Serie B group B
Pink Bari	Bari	Stadio Antonio Antonucci (Bitetto)	600	10th in Serie A
Roma	Rome	Stadio Tre Fontane	4,000	Res Roma's license
Sassuolo	Sassuolo	Stadio comunale Mirabello (Reggio Emilia)	4,008	9th in Serie A
Tavagnacco	Tavagnacco	Stadio Comunale Tavagnacco	500	4th in Serie A
Hellas Verona	Verona	Stadio Aldo Olivieri	2,900	7th in Serie A

=== Personnel and kits ===
Team	Manager	Captain	Kit manufacturer	Sponsors
Atalanta Mozzanica	(Italy) Michele Ardito	(Italy) Daniela Stracchi	Joma	Multiple
Chievo	(Italy) Diego Zuccher	(Italy) Valentina Boni	Givova	Fimauto BMW
Fiorentina	(Italy) Antonio Cincotta	(Italy) Alia Guagni	Le Coq Sportif	CF&P Burberry
Florentia	(Italy) Stefano Carobbi	(Italy) Elisabetta Tona	Macron	Severino Becagli
Juventus	(Italy) Rita Guarino	(Italy) Sara Gama	Adidas	Jeep
Milan	(Italy) Carolina Morace	(Italy) Raffaella Manieri	Puma	Fly Emirates
Orobica	(Italy) Marianna Marini	(Italy) Amalia Vezzoli	Joma	AriBerg Compressors
Pink Bari	(Italy) Roberto D'Ermilio	(Italy) Francesca Soro	Kappa	BeOn Energy
Roma	(Italy) Elisabetta Bavagnoli	(Italy) Elisa Bartoli	Nike	Qatar Airways
Sassuolo	(Italy) Gianpietro Piovani	(Italy) Sandy Iannella	Kappa	Mapei
Tavagnacco	(Italy) Marco Rossi	(Italy) Elisa Camporese	Evol	Megavision
Hellas Verona	(Italy) Sara Di Filippo	(Switzerland) Nicole Studer	Joma	

== League table ==
Pos	Team	Pld	W	D	L	GF	GA	GD	Pts	Qualification or relegation
1	Juventus (C)	22	18	2	2	63	8	+55	56	Qualification to Champions League
2	Fiorentina	22	18	1	3	70	13	+57	55	Qualification to Champions League
3	Milan	22	16	3	3	54	21	+33	51	
4	Roma	22	11	3	8	43	30	+13	36	
5	Atalanta Mozzanica	22	9	6	7	30	29	+1	33	
6	Florentia	22	9	3	10	31	39	−8	30	
7	Sassuolo	22	9	6	7	37	31	+6	33	
8	Tavagnacco	22	6	6	10	26	43	−17	24	
9	Hellas Verona	22	6	1	15	31	47	−16	19	
10	Chievo	22	6	2	14	32	64	−32	20	
11	Pink Bari (R)	22	4	3	15	18	59	−41	15	Relegation to Serie B
12	Orobica Bergamo (R)	22	1	2	19	13	64	−51	5	Relegation to Serie B

Source: soccerway.com
Rules for classification: 1) Points; 2) Goal difference; 3) Number of goals scored; 4) Head-to-head points; 5) Head-to-head goal difference; 6) Head-to-head away goals scored
(C) Champions; (R) Relegated

== Results ==
Home \ Away	ATA	CHI	FIO	FLO	JUV	MIL	ORO	BAR	ROM	SAS	TAV	VER
Atalanta Mozzanica	—	5–1	0–6	1–2	0–0	0–2			0–2	0–1		0–1
Chievo	2–2	—	0–5	5–0	0–2	2–5	3–1	2–1	0–5	1–1	2–3	0–1
Fiorentina	6–1	2–0	—	4–2	0–2	4–0	6–0	8–0	2–1	4–1	2–0	3–0
Florentia		2–1	0–3	—	0–3	1–1			1–2			
Juventus	1–1	6–0	1–0	3–0	—	2–0	5–0	5–0	1–0	4–0	5–0	5–1
Milan	0–0	1–2	3–2	1–0	3–0	—	3–1	8–0	4–1	5–2	1–0	2–0
Orobica Bergamo	0–2	0–3	0–2	0–2	0–5	0–1	—	1–1				1–0
Pink Bari		3–1	0–2	0–2	1–3	0–6		—	0–1	0–4		2–1
Roma		7–1	0–0		0–4	1–2	3–0		—		2–2	
Sassuolo		0–1	0–2	0–1	2–1	2–2			3–2	—		4–1
Tavagnacco	0–2	3–2	0–1		0–2	1–3	1–0	2–1		1–1	—	
Hellas Verona		9–3	2–6	2–2	0–3	0–1			1–0		3–1	—

Updated to match(es) played on 17 December 2018. Source: Calcio femminile FIGC
Legend: Blue = home team win; Yellow = draw; Red = away team win.
For upcoming matches, an "a" indicates there is an article about the rivalry between the two participants.

== Season statistics ==
=== Top goalscorers ===
Rank	Player	Club	Goals
1	(Italy) Valentina Giacinti	Milan	21
2	(Italy) Daniela Sabatino	Milan	17
3	(England) Eniola Aluko	Juventus	14
4	(Italy) Barbara Bonansea	Juventus	13
4	(Italy) Cristiana Girelli	Juventus	13
4	(Italy) Stefania Tarenzi	Chievo	13
7	(Italy) Ilaria Mauro	Fiorentina	12
7	(Scotland) Lana Clelland	Fiorentina	12
9	(Italy) Tatiana Bonetti	Fiorentina	11
9	(Italy) Deborah Salvatori Rinaldi	Fiorentina	11
9	(Italy) Annamaria Serturini	Roma	11

Last updated: 20 April 2019

== Number of teams by region ==
Number of teams	Region	Team(s)
3	Lombardy	Atalanta Mozzanica, Orobica and Milan
2	Tuscany	Fiorentina and Florentia
2	Veneto	Chievo and Hellas Verona
1	Emilia-Romagna	Sassuolo
1	Friuli-Venezia Giulia	Tavagnacco
1	Lazio	Roma
1	Piedmont	Juventus
1	Puglia	Pink Bari
