= Maria Sorvillo =

Italian footballer

Personal information
- Full name: Maria Sorvillo
- Date of birth: 10 March 1982 (age 44)
- Place of birth: Aversa, Italy
- Height: 1.65 m (5 ft 5 in)
- Position: Defender

Senior career*
Years	Team	Apps	(Gls)
1997–2004	SS Lazio		
2004–2005	ACF Torino		
2005–2006	Monti del Matese CF		
2006–2009	CF Bardolino		
2009–2010	Torres CF	19	(1)
2010–	UPC Tavagnacco	30	(8)

International career
- Italy
- * Club domestic league appearances and goals

Maria Sorvillo is an Italian football defender, currently playing for UPC Tavagnacco in Italy's Serie A. She has won five leagues with SS Lazio, CF Bardolino and Torres CF.

She has been a member of the Italian national team.
