= 2017–18 Serie A (women) =

Serie A (women)
- Season: 2017–18
- Dates: 30 September 2017 - 12 May 2018
- Champions: Juventus (1st title)
- Relegated: San Zaccaria; Empoli
- Champions League: Juventus; Fiorentina
- Matches: 132
- Goals: 424 (3.21 per match)
- Top goalscorer: Valentina Giacinti (21 goals)

The 2017–18 Serie A (women) was the 51st season of the women's football top level league in Italy. Fiorentina were the defending champions. Juventus won the league title in their first ever season.

== Teams ==
Twelve teams will compete in the league, with many changes among the make up of the league compared to last season.

Four teams were relegated at the end of the 2016-17 season. Jesina, Luserna and Chieti finished at the bottom of the league, with Como 2000 losing a relegation playoff to San Zaccaria.

Reggiana won promotion from Serie B, but their license was taken over by Sassuolo. Other promoted teams were Empoli, Valpolicella and Pink Bari.

Cuneo, who finished seventh in Serie A last season, sold their license to Juventus.

== League table ==
Brescia sold their Serie A spot to AC Milan after the season, who created a women's team. They were not allowed to enter the Champions League therefore. The tied third placed teams played a play-off for the vacant spot.

Pos	Team	Pld	W	D	L	GF	GA	GD	Pts	Qualification or relegation
1	Juventus (C)	22	20	0	2	64	9	+55	60	Qualification to Champions League
2	Brescia	22	20	0	2	71	24	+47	60	
3	Fiorentina	22	13	4	5	46	20	+26	43	Qualification to Champions League
4	Tavagnacco	22	14	1	7	49	28	+21	43	
5	Atalanta Mozzanica	22	13	3	6	37	27	+10	42	
6	Valpolicella	22	8	2	12	27	46	−19	26	
7	AGSM Verona	22	7	4	11	33	40	−7	25	
8	Res Roma	22	7	1	14	19	36	−17	22	
9	Sassuolo	22	6	1	15	21	39	−18	19	
10	Pink Bari	22	5	1	16	19	53	−34	16	
11	San Zaccaria (R)	22	3	7	12	23	44	−21	16	Relegation to Serie B
12	Empoli (R)	22	3	2	17	16	59	−43	11	Relegation to Serie B

Source: soccerway.com
Rules for classification: 1) Points; 2) Goal difference; 3) Number of goals scored; 4) Head-to-head points; 5) Head-to-head goal difference; 6) Head-to-head away goals scored
(C) Champions; (R) Relegated

== Playoffs ==
=== Championship playoff ===
After finishing tied on points at the end of the regular season, Juventus and Brescia will play-off to decide the winner of the league title.

20 May 2018
20:45

Juventus	0–0 (a.e.t.)	Brescia
	Report
Penalties
Bonansea (penalty missed); Rosucci (penalty scored); Gama (penalty scored); Galli (penalty scored); Cernoia (penalty scored); Boattin (penalty scored)	5–4	(penalty scored) Girelli; (penalty scored) Giugliano; (penalty missed) Daleszczyk; (penalty scored) Sikora; (penalty scored) Sabatino; (penalty missed) Di Criscio

Stadio Silvio Piola, Novara
Attendance: 3,200
Referee: Anna Scapolo

=== Champions League playoff ===
Brescia were bought by Milan after the season, and lost the right to enter the UEFA Women's Champions League. Since Tavagnacco and Fiorentina finished tied on points in third place, and a play-off was played determine which team enter as the replacement team.

16 June 2018
18:00

Tavagnacco	0–3	Fiorentina

Stadio Comunale Abano Terme, Abano Terme

=== Relegation playoff ===
After finishing tied on points after the end of the regular season, Pink Bari and San Zaccaria will play to decide the second relegated club. The winning club will advance to a play-out with Serie B teams, while the losing club will be relegated to Serie B for 2018-19.

19 May 2018

Pink Bari	3–2	San Zaccaria
Piro 15' (pen.); Parascandolo 20'; Manno 52'	Report	Pugnali 45', 61'

Campo Sportivo Galileo Speciale, Montesilvano
Referee: Agostino de Santis

== Results ==
Home \ Away	VER	BRE	EMP	VAL	FIO	JUV	ATA	BAR	ROM	ZAC	SAS	TAV
AGSM Verona	—	3–6	2–1	1–1	1–1	0–2	1–2	2–1	3–0	4–2	2–2	2–3
Brescia	3–0	—	4–1	4–2	1–0	0–4	2–3	4–0	4–1	2–1	2–1	2–0
Empoli	1–5	0–5	—	1–4	1–3	1–4	0–2	0–1	0–4	1–1	0–4	0–4
Valpolicella	1–0	1–3	2–0	—	1–6	0–2	1–3	2–0	0–1	2–1	2–1	0–1
Fiorentina	1–2	2–4	1–0	4–0	—	2–1	0–0	2–1	5–0	4–0	2–0	1–1
Juventus	1–0	1–2	4–0	6–0	2–0	—	3–0	4–1	4–0	2–1	2–0	4–0
Atalanta Mozzanica	0–0	1–2	0–1	3–2	0–1	0–3	—	4–0	1–0	2–2	2–0	4–2
Pink Bari	3–1	0–6	1–3	2–4	0–3	1–2	0–2	—	1–0	0–0	2–1	1–0
Res Roma	3–0	0–3	2–1	3–0	0–4	0–1	0–1	2–1	—	1–1	0–1	0–2
San Zaccaria	2–3	1–4	2–2	1–1	0–0	0–5	1–3	3–1	0–1	—	2–0	1–5
Sassuolo	2–1	0–2	0–1	0–1	2–4	0–5	1–2	4–2	1–0	1–0	—	0–4
Tavagnacco	2–0	2–6	4–1	3–0	3–0	1–2	5–2	4–0	2–1	0–1	1–0	—

Updated to match(es) played on 12 May 2018. Source: Calcio femminile italiano
Legend: Blue = home team win; Yellow = draw; Red = away team win.
For upcoming matches, an "a" indicates there is an article about the rivalry between the two participants.

== Season statistics ==
=== Scoring ===
As of 13 May 2018

==== Top scorers ====
Rank	Player	Club	Goals
1	(Italy) Valentina Giacinti	Brescia	21
2	(Italy) Barbara Bonansea	Juventus	19
3	(Italy) Cristiana Girelli	Brescia	17
4	(Italy) Paola Brumana	Tavagnacco	14
5	(Scotland) Lana Clelland	Tavagnacco	13
