= 2016–17 Serie A (women) =

Serie A (women)
- Season: 2016–17
- Champions: Fiorentina
- Relegated: Como; Chieti; Luserna; Jesina
- UEFA Women's Champions League: Fiorentina; Brescia

The 2016–17 Serie A was the 50th season of the women's football top level league in Italy. ACF Brescia were the defending champions.

Fiorentina won the championship.

== Standings ==
| Pos | Team | Pld | W | D | L | GF | GA | GD | Pts | Qualification or relegation |
|---|---|---|---|---|---|---|---|---|---|---|
| 1 | Fiorentina (C) | 22 | 21 | 0 | 1 | 88 | 7 | +81 | 63 | Qualification to Champions League |
| 2 | Brescia | 22 | 18 | 1 | 3 | 64 | 22 | +42 | 55 | Qualification to Champions League |
| 3 | Verona | 22 | 14 | 3 | 5 | 64 | 34 | +30 | 45 | |
| 4 | Mozzanica | 22 | 14 | 2 | 6 | 59 | 33 | +26 | 44 | |
| 5 | Res Roma | 22 | 10 | 5 | 7 | 34 | 30 | +4 | 35 | |
| 6 | Tavagnacco | 22 | 10 | 3 | 9 | 59 | 49 | +10 | 33 | |
| 7 | Cuneo (Note: Sold their Serie A licence to newly formed Juventus F.C. after the season.) | 22 | 7 | 5 | 10 | 28 | 45 | −17 | 26 | Relegation play-outs |
| 8 | San Zaccaria | 22 | 6 | 3 | 13 | 43 | 63 | −20 | 21 | Relegation play-outs |
| 9 | Como (R) | 22 | 5 | 4 | 13 | 27 | 53 | −26 | 19 | Relegation play-outs |
| 10 | Chieti (R) | 22 | 4 | 3 | 15 | 28 | 66 | −38 | 15 | Relegation play-outs |
| 11 | Luserna (R) | 22 | 4 | 2 | 16 | 30 | 75 | −45 | 14 | Relegation to Serie B |
| 12 | Jesina (R) | 22 | 2 | 3 | 17 | 25 | 72 | −47 | 9 | Relegation to Serie B |

Source: soccerway.com
Rules for classification: 1) Points; 2) Goal difference; 3) Number of goals scored; 4) Head-to-head points; 5) Head-to-head goal difference; 6) Head-to-head away goals scored
(C) Champions; (R) Relegated

== Relegation play-offs ==
Scheduled as 7th vs 10th, and 8th vs 9th place unless one team trails the other by more than seven points. Thus Cuneo remained in Serie A without the play-off and Chieti was relegated. The other match was won by Zaccaria 3–0 over Como.

== Top scorers ==
As of 13 May 2017.

| Rank | Player | Club | Goals |
|---|---|---|---|
| 1 | (Scotland) Lana Clelland | UPC Tavagnacco | 23 |
| 2 | (Italy) Tatiana Bonetti | Fiorentina | 21 |
| 3 | (Italy) Valeria Pirone | ASD Mozzanica | 19 |
| 4 | (Italy) Cristiana Girelli | ACF Brescia | 16 |
| 4 | (Italy) Ilaria Mauro | Fiorentina | 16 |
| 6 | (Italy) Melania Gabbiadini | Verona | 15 |
| 6 | (Italy) Manuela Giugliano | Verona | 15 |
| 8 | (Italy) Patrizia Caccamo | Fiorentina | 14 |
| 8 | (Italy) Valentina Giacinti | Mozzanica | 14 |
| 10 | (Italy) Barbara Bonansea | Brescia | 12 |
| 10 | (Italy) Melania Martinovic | Res Roma | 12 |
