= Eva Russo =

Italian footballer and actress (born 1966)

Personal information
- Full name: Eva Russo
- Date of birth: 20 December 1966 (age 59)
- Place of birth: Colleferro, Italy
- Position: Goalkeeper

Senior career*
Years	Team	Apps	(Gls)
1980–1985	Lazio		
1986–1987	Napoli		
1987–1989	Lazio		
1989–1990	Prato Wonder		
1991–1993	Milan Salvarani		
1993–1994	Agliana		
1994–1995	Lazio		
1995–1997	ACF Milan		
1997–1998	Lazio		

International career
1982–1989	Italy	57	(0)
- * Club domestic league appearances and goals

Eva Russo (born 20 December 1966) is an Italian actress and former international football goalkeeper.

Russo had 57 caps for the Italy women's national football team in December 1989 when she failed a drugs test ahead of a match with Switzerland and received a six-month suspension.

While playing for Lazio, she was engaged to the male Lazio footballer Francesco Dell'Anno. The engagement broke off after four years. Russo also worked as an actress.

== Honours ==
=== Club ===
Lazio

- Serie A (2): 1980, 1987–88
- Coppa Italia (1): 1985

Milan Salvarani

- Serie A (1): 1991–92

=== International ===
Italy

- UEFA Women's Championship Third place: 1987
- Mundialito (2): 1984, 1986

== Filmography ==
=== Film ===
Year	Title	Role	Notes
1992	Rome Roméo	Pierra	
1997	Soft Air	Lory	

=== Television ===
Year	Title	Role	Notes
1998	Dio vede e provvede	Player	
