= Emma Martin =

Emma Martin may refer to:

- Emma Marshall (1830–1899), née Martin, English children's author
- Emma Martin (socialist) (1811/12–1851), British author, socialist and free thinker
- Emma May Martin (1865–1957), Canadian artist
- Emma Martín (born 2002), Spanish footballer
