= Melania Martinovic =

Italian footballer (born 1993)

Personal information
- Date of birth: 26 May 1993 (age 33)
- Place of birth: Rome, Italy
- Position: Forward

Team information
- Current team: Res Roma
- Number: 24

Senior career*
Years	Team	Apps	(Gls)
2016–2018	Res Roma	33	(17)
2018	Sassuolo	4	(0)
2018–2019	Atalanta	13	(4)
2019–2021	Florentia	37	(15)
2021	Fiorentina	5	(0)
2022	Sampdoria	11	(2)
2022–2023	Parma	24	(6)
2023–2024	Como	24	(6)
2024	Napoli	13	(0)
2025	Lazio	9	(0)
2025–	Res Roma	0	(0)
- * Club domestic league appearances and goals as of 3 May 2025

Melania Martinovic (born 26 May 1993) is an Italian professional footballer who plays as a striker for Serie B club Res Roma. She was born and raised in Italy to Montenegrin parents.
