= Lone Smidt Nielsen =

Danish footballer (born 1961)

Personal information
- Full name: Lone Smidt Nielsen
- Date of birth: 1 January 1961 (age 65)
- Place of birth: Vejle, Denmark
- Position: Forward

Youth career
- Hover IF

Senior career*
Years	Team	Apps	(Gls)
1976–1978	Kolding B		
1978–1985	B 1909		
1985–1986	ACF Trani		
1987–1990	B 1909		

International career
1977–1988	Denmark	57	(22)
- * Club domestic league appearances and goals as of 11:26, 18 February 2012 (UTC)

Lone Smidt Nielsen (née Hansen; born 1 January 1961) is a Danish former international footballer who played professionally in Italy with ACF Trani. She was the first women's player to reach 50 games on the Danish national team, and she was included in the Danish Football Hall of Fame in 2017.

== Career ==
Smidt Nielsen played football at Hover IF, before joining Kolding Boldklub at the age of 16. Here she made her debut for the first team within the same year. A year later she made her debut for the Danish national team.

In 1978 she joined B1909, where she won the Danish Championship in 1981 and 1983. In 1985 she joined Italian ACF Trani 80 together with Susanne Augustesen and Ulla Bastrup.

Here she won the Italian Championship twice, and was the top scorer in both seasons. Afterwards she returned to Denmark and B1909, where she played until 1990, where she retired.

== National team ==
After making her debut, she played 51 national team games in a row, making her the first player to reach 50 matches for the Danish national team.

She took a break from the national team due to maternity leave, but returned in 1988 and played further 6 games.

Her biggest achievement with Denmark was winning the 1979 European Competition for Women's Football. In the final against the host nation Italy she scored one of the goals in Denmark's 2-0 win.

She held the record for most matches on the Danish national team until 1994, when she was overtaken by Lotte Bagge.

== Legacy ==
In 2015 Smidt Nielsen was named the women's player of the century by the Danish FA. She was also included in the Danish Football Hall of Fame in 2017 together with Susanne Augustesen as the first female players.

The Danish sportswear company Hummel has named a football shoe after her.

== Private ==
Lone's daughter Karoline Smidt Nielsen also played football, for Turbine Potsdam and Denmark's national team.
