= Conchi Sánchez =

Spanish footballer (born 1957)

Concepcion Sanchez-Freire
Personal information
- Full name: Concepción Sánchez Freire
- Date of birth: 28 September 1957 (age 69)
- Place of birth: Madrid, Spain
- Position: Striker

Senior career*
Years	Team	Apps	(Gls)
1973–1975	Gamma 3 Padova		
1976–1977	Valdobbiadene		
1978–1979	Conegliano		
1980–1981	Gorgonzola		
1982	Cagliari		
1982–1983	Trani		
1983–1985	Lazio		
1985–1986	Verona		
1986–1988	Lazio		
1988–1989	Campania G.B.		
1989–1990	Prato		
1993–1994	Lazio		
1994–1995	Delfino		
1995–1996	Arsenal		

International career
1971–1981	Spain XI	6	(2)
- * Club domestic league appearances and goals

Concepción Sánchez-Freire (Conchi Amancio) (born 28 September 1957) is a Spanish International, former football striker. She played for most of her career in Italy, winning seven national championships and 8 Italian Cups with Gamma 3 Padova, ACF Valdobbiadene, SS Lazio and GB Campania. She also played one year for Arsenal LFC in the FA Women's Premier League, after which she ended her career at 39.

Concepcion Sánchez also known as Conchi Amancio, was the first captain of the Spain national team, following the foundation of the official Spain women's team in 1972.

She preferred to shorten her name to "Conchi" and was nicknamed "Amancio" after the male footballer Amancio Amaro.

She was a coach at Filton College, a women's football academy in Bristol that merged with English team Bristol City W.F.C. ahead of them entering the Women's Super League – Bristol knocked Barcelona out of the 2014–15 UEFA Women's Champions League.

== Honours ==
- Serie A: 7

1973, 1974, 1976, 1977, 1986–87, 1987–88, 1988–89

- Italian Women's Cup: 8

1974, 1978, 1979, 1980, 1982–83, 1984–85, 1988–89

Italy Serie A women's champion with the Roma 3 Z (Futsal) 1992/93

( top scorer with 50 goals )
