= Bastrup =

Bastrup is a Danish surname. Notable people with the surname include:

- Knud Bastrup-Birk (1919–1973), Danish footballer
- Lars Bastrup (born 1955), Danish footballer
- Nana Rosenørn Holland Bastrup (born 1987), Danish artist
- Olav Rune Ekeland Bastrup (born 1956), Norwegian writer and historian
- Ulla Bastrup (born 1959), Danish footballer
- Wayne Bastrup (born 1976), American actor and musician
