= Elisabetta Vignotto =

Italian footballer (born 1954)

Personal information
- Full name: Elisabetta Vignotto
- Date of birth: 13 January 1954 (age 72)
- Place of birth: San Donà di Piave, Italy
- Position: Striker

Senior career*
Years	Team	Apps	(Gls)
1970	Gommagomma	22	(18)
1971	Real Juventus	22	(51)
1972–1975	Gamma 3 Padova	78	(108)
1976	Valdobbiadene	22	(27)
1977	Padova	22	(35)
1978	Eurokalor Bologna	13	(13)
1979–1982	Gorgonzola	82	(91)
1983	Piacenza	21	(13)
1984	Giolli Gelati Roma	19	(21)
1985	Roma CF	24	(20)
1986–1988	Friulvini Pordenone	74	(36)
1988–1990	Reggiana Zambelli	57	(34)

International career^{‡}
1970–1989	Italy	110	(107)
- * Club domestic league appearances and goals as of 12:00, 15 September 2011 (UTC) ‡ National team caps and goals as of 12:00, 15 September 2011 (UTC)

Elisabetta Vignotto (born 13 January 1954) is an Italian former footballer who played as a striker.

== Club career ==
At club level Vignotto represented numerous different clubs in Serie A. In 1986 she told la Repubblica: "So far I've changed teams ten times. But it's not that I'm capricious. The teams broke up." According to the Dizionario del Calcio Italiano, she scored 467 goals in 461 Serie A appearances.

She was the chairman (Italian: presidente, lit. 'president') of A.S.D. Reggiana Calcio Femminile (and later A.S.D. Sassuolo Calcio Femminile).

== International career ==
Vignotto reportedly scored 107 goals in 109 games for the Italian national team. FIFA suggest she made 110 appearances. The Italian Football Federation (FIGC) website does not support this, suggesting figures of 97 goals in 95 national team games.

Vignotto held the goalscoring record for women's international matches until May 1999, when she was surpassed by Mia Hamm, who scored her 108th goal for the United States.

She was inducted into the Italian Football Hall of Fame in 2017.

== Honours ==
=== Club ===
Gommagomma

- Serie A: 1970

Real Juventus

- Serie A: 1971

Gamma 3 Padova

- Serie A: 1972, 1973
- Coppa Italia: 1974

Valdobbiadene

- Serie A: 1976

Gorgonzola

- Coppa Italia: 1980

Reggiana

- Serie A: 1989–90

=== International ===
Italy

- Mundialito: 1984, 1986

=== Individual ===
- Serie A top scorer: 1971, 1972, 1973, 1974, 1980
- Italian Football Hall of Fame: 2017

== International goals ==
No.	Date	Venue	Opponent	Score	Result	Competition
1.	6 May 1971	Guadalajara, Mexico	Denmark	?–0	2–0	Friendly
2.	2 June 1971	Trapani, Italy	England	5–0	7–0	1971 Women's World Cup qualifying
3.	6 June 1971	Palermo, Italy	Austria	1–0	6–0	1971 Women's World Cup qualifying
4.	6 June 1971	Palermo, Italy	Austria	3–0	6–0	1971 Women's World Cup qualifying
5.	6 June 1971	Palermo, Italy	Austria	4–0	6–0	1971 Women's World Cup qualifying
6.	6 June 1971	Palermo, Italy	Austria	5–0	6–0	1971 Women's World Cup qualifying
7.	6 June 1971	Palermo, Italy	Austria	6–0	6–0	1971 Women's World Cup qualifying
8.	20 July 1971	Turin, Italy	Spain	2–0	8–1	Friendly
9.	20 July 1971	Turin, Italy	Spain	5–0	8–1	Friendly
10.	20 July 1971	Turin, Italy	Spain	6–0	8–1	Friendly
11.	4 September 1971	Guadalajara, Mexico	Argentina	1–0	4–0	1971 Women's World Cup
12.	4 September 1971	Guadalajara, Mexico	Argentina	2–0	4–0	1971 Women's World Cup
13.	4 September 1971	Guadalajara, Mexico	Argentina	4–0	4–0	1971 Women's World Cup
14.	25 June 1972	Vicenza, Italy	Yugoslavia	?–0	3–0	Friendly
15.	1 November 1972	Padua, Italy	Spain	2–0	5–0	Friendly
16.	1 November 1972	Padua, Italy	Spain	3–0	5–0	Friendly
17.	8 December 1972	Córdoba, Spain	Spain	4–0	5–1	Friendly
18.	10 December 1972	Badajoz, Spain	Spain	2–0	4–1	Friendly
19.	10 December 1972	Badajoz, Spain	Spain	3–1	4–1	Friendly
20.	4 June 1973	Milan, Italy	Czechoslovakia	1–0	1–0	Friendly
21.	19 May 1974	Valence, France	France	3–0	3–2	Friendly
22.	2 June 1976	Rome, Italy	England	1–0	2–0	Friendly
23.	2 June 1976	Rome, Italy	England	2–0	2–0	Friendly
24.	28 May 1978	Naples, Italy	Netherlands	1–?	1–1	Friendly
25.	28 July 1978	Atri, Italy	Belgium	?–1	2–1	1978 Mundialito
26.	2 August 1978	Pescara, Italy	Wales	?–0	7–0	1978 Mundialito
27.	2 August 1978	Pescara, Italy	Wales	?–0	7–0	1978 Mundialito
28.	5 August 1978	Pescara, Italy	Scotland	?–?	4–1	1978 Mundialito
29.	5 August 1978	Pescara, Italy	Scotland	?–?	4–1	1978 Mundialito

== See also ==
- List of women's association football players with 100 or more international goals
- List of women footballers with 300 or more goals
