= Chiara Gazzoli =

Italian footballer (born 1978)

Personal information
- Full name: Chiara Gazzoli
- Date of birth: 21 August 1978 (age 48)
- Place of birth: Cernusco sul Naviglio, Italy
- Height: 1.65 m (5 ft 5 in)
- Position: Striker

Senior career*
Years	Team	Apps	(Gls)
1994–2001	Milan	143	(128)
2001–2004	Foroni Verona		(105)
2004–2005	Torres		(11)
2005–2007	Fiammamonza		(22)

International career
1999–2007	Italy	35	(13)
- * Club domestic league appearances and goals

Chiara Gazzoli (born 21 August 1978) is an Italian former football striker.

== Club career ==
She played for ACF Milan, Foroni Verona, Torres CF and ASD Fiammamonza between 1994 and 2007, when she turned to 7-a-side football. She won four leagues with Milan, Foroni and Fiammamonza, and was the league's top scorer in 2003 and 2004. Her 54 goals in 2003 make her the second top scoring player in one season in Serie A, next to Elisabetta Vignotto's 1972 56-goal record. She was also the top scorer of the 2004 UEFA Women's Cup.

== International career ==
She was a member of the Italian national team, and played the 2005 European Championship.
