= Kerttu Karresmaa =

Finnish footballer (born 2004)

Personal information
- Date of birth: 22 August 2004 (age 22)
- Place of birth: Finland
- Position: Goalkeeper

Team information
- Current team: Lazio
- Number: 12

Youth career
- Wimma
- ONS
- HauPa
- HFA-Märsky

Senior career*
Years	Team	Apps	(Gls)
2022	NJS	7	(0)
2023	EBK	16	(0)
2023–2024	Sampdoria	4	(0)
2024–	Lazio	2	(0)

International career^{‡}
2019	Finland U16	1	(0)
2022–2023	Finland U19	5	(0)
2023–	Finland U23	2	(0)
- * Club domestic league appearances and goals as of 3 July 2025 ‡ National team caps and goals as of 30 December 2024

Kerttu Karresmaa (born 22 August 2004) is a Finnish professional footballer who plays as a goalkeeper for Serie A club Lazio.

== Career ==
Karresmaa played for the youth sectors of FC Wimma, Oulu Nice Soccer, Haukiputaan Pallo and HFA-Märsky.

She started her senior career with NJS in Kansallinen Liiga in 2022 and moved to the second tier club EBK in 2023.

In October 2023, she moved to Italy and joined Sampdoria, making four appearances in the Serie A.

For the 2024–25 season, Karresmaa signed with Lazio.

== Career statistics ==
As of 29 June 2025

Appearances and goals by club, season and competition
Club	Season	League			National cup (Note: Includes Finnish Women's Cup and Coppa Italia Women)		Europe		Total	
Club	Season	Division	Apps	Goals	Apps	Goals	Apps	Goals	Apps	Goals
NJS	2022	Kansallinen Liiga	7	0	–		–		7	0
EBK	2023	Naisten Ykkönen	16	0	2	0	–		18	0
Sampdoria	2023–24	Serie A	4	0	3	0	–		7	0
Lazio	2024–25	Serie A	2	0	4	0	–		6	0
Career total			29	0	9	0	0	0	38	0
