= Chiara Eusebio =

Italian footballer (born 1995)

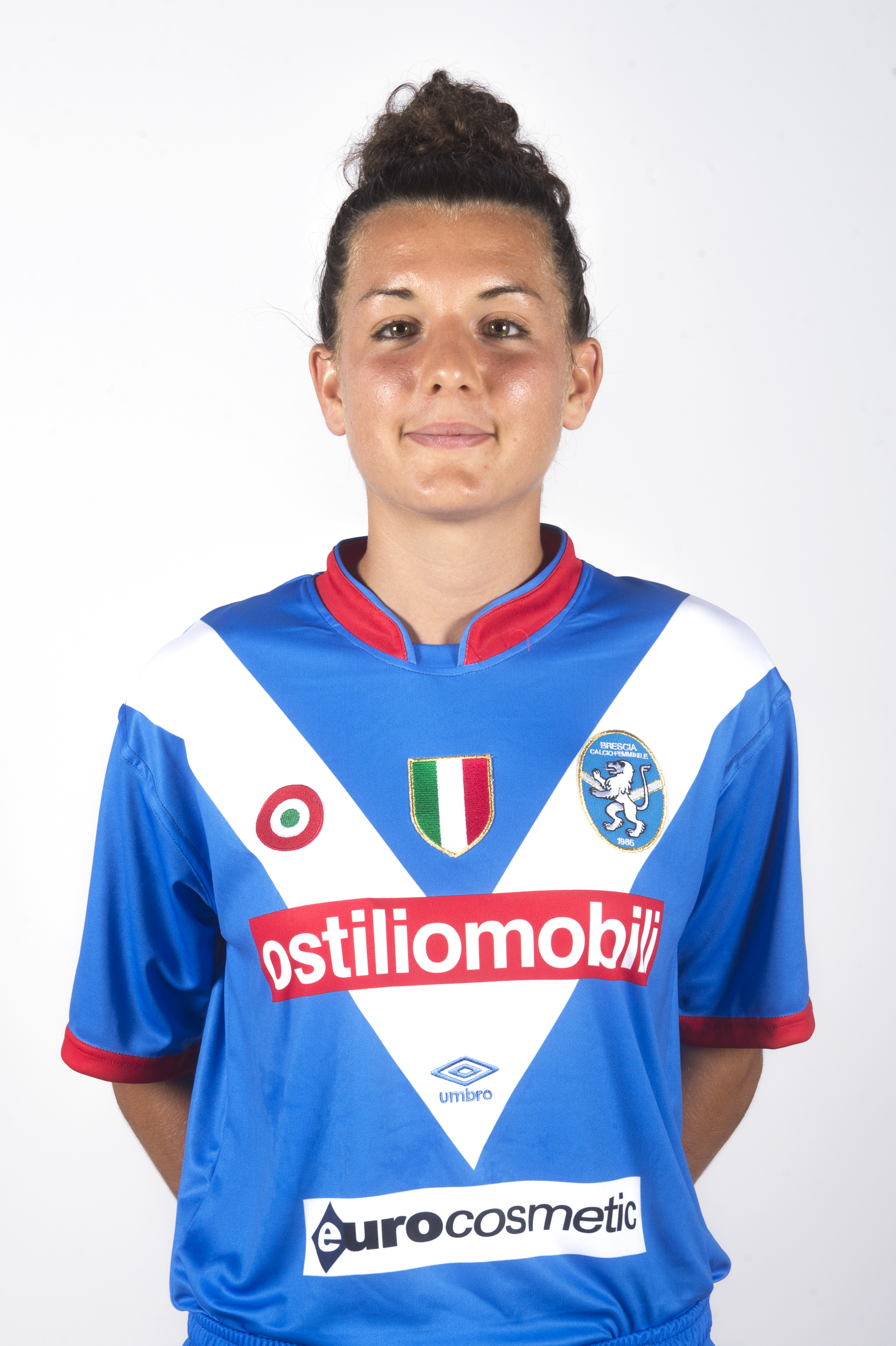
- Eusebio in 2016.

Personal information
- Date of birth: 4 July 1995 (age 31)
- Place of birth: Turin, Italy
- Position: Midfielder

Youth career
- –2011: Torino

Senior career*
Years	Team	Apps	(Gls)
2011–2015	Torino	50	(1)
2014–2015	→ Riviera di Romagna (loan)	26	(1)
2015–2017	Brescia	31	(3)
2017–2018	→ Sassuolo (loan)	6	(0)

International career^{‡}
2012–2013	Italy U19	8	(0)
2014–2015	Italy U23	1+	(0)
2015–201?	Italy	4	(0)
- * Club domestic league appearances and goals as of 16:07, 23 June 2021 (UTC) ‡ National team caps and goals as of 16:07, 23 June 2021 (UTC)

Chiara Eusebio (born 4 July 1995) is an Italian footballer, who has played for the Italy women's national football team. At club level, she most recently played for Sassuolo on loan from Brescia.

== Club career ==
Eusebio played as a midfielder. Eusebio started her career at Torino, and made her debut in the 2011–12 Serie A season. During the 2014–15 season, she made 27 appearances on loan at Riviera di Romagna, scoring one goal. In July 2015, Eusebio signed for Brescia; she played for them from 2015 to 2017. During that time, Brescia won the 2015–16 Serie A championship, 2015–16 Coppa Italia, and the 2016 and 2017 Supercoppa Italianas, and reached the quarter-finals of the 2015–16 UEFA Women's Champions League. Eusebio made seven appearances for Brescia in the UEFA Women's Champions League, and made a total of 34 appearances for Brescia in all competitions, scoring three goals. In June 2017, Eusebio announced that she was leaving Brescia at the end of the season; the decision for her to leave was by mutual consent. In September 2017, Eusebio joined Sassuolo on loan from Brescia.

== International career ==
Between 2012 and 2013, Eusebio played eight matches for the Italy under-19s, including in the 2013 UEFA Women's Under-19 Championship second qualifying round.

She was first called up to the senior squad for the 2015 Cyprus Women's Cup; she was one of five uncapped players in the squad. In May 2015, she played for Italy in a friendly match against Japan. Later in the year, she was in the Italian squad for two matches in China, and played in one of the matches in the tour. In 2017, she was in the Italy under-23s squad to play a friendly against the senior squad.

== Personal life ==
Eusebio is from Turin, Italy.
