= Torino Women ASD =

Italian football club

Torino Women
- Full name: Torino Women Associazione Sportiva Dilettantistica
- Founded: 1981
- Ground: Centro Sportivo Don Giacomo Mosso, Venaria Reale
- Capacity: 1,500
- Chairman: Roberto Salerno
- Manager: Fulvio Francini
- League: Serie C - Group A
- Website: torinocf.it/calcio-femminile
Home colours	Away colours

Torino Women Associazione Sportiva Dilettantistica, or simply Torino Women, is an Italian football team from Turin competing in Serie C for the 2025–26 season.

Founded in 1981, Torino reached five years later Serie A where it has played since. While the club has yet to win a national trophy, Torino was the championship's runner-up in 1994 and 2007. In 2007 it also reached the national Cup's final. Up to the early 2010s it held a steady place in Serie A but relegation in the 2012–2013 season saw them drop to Serie B. A restructuring of the league system for the 2018–2019 season then saw them consigned to the newly established Serie C. The team remained here for a few seasons but declined to register for the competition in 2021–2022, instead joining the Piedmont region of the fourth-tier Eccellenza league. The club won promotion from Eccellenza league in 2024–25 season via play-off, returning to Serie C (in Group A) for the 2025–26 season.

== Honours ==
=== Titles ===
==== Invitational ====
- Menton Tournament
  - 1997, 2000

=== Competition record ===
Season	Division	Place	Coppa
1984–85	3	?	
1985–86	2 (Gr. A)	2nd	
1986–87	1	7th	
1987–88	1	6th	
1988–89	1	5th	
1989–90	1	10th	
1990–91	1	9th	
1991–92	1	7th	
1992–93	1	8th	
1993–94	1	2nd	
1994–95	1	7th	
1995–96	1	3rd	
1996–97	1	3rd	
1997–98	1	9th	
1998–99	1	6th	

Season	Division	Place	Coppa
1999–00	1	14th	Round 2
2000–01	1	13th	Round 1
2001–02	1	10th	
2002–03	1	9th	
2003–04	1	10th	Quarterfinals
2004–05	1	3rd	Quarterfinals
2005–06	1	3rd	Semifinals
2006–07	1	2nd	Finalist
2007–08	1	5th	Round of 16
2008–09	1	7th	Round of 16
2009–10	1	5th	Round 4
2010–11	1	7th	Round of 16
2011–12	1	6th	Quarterfinals

== Current squad ==
As of 6 March 2013 (reference) – Note: Flags indicate national team as defined under FIFA eligibility rules; some limited exceptions apply. Players may hold more than one non-FIFA nationality.

No.	Pos.	Nation	Player
—	GK	ITA	Arianna Ozimo
—	DF	ITA	Brigitta Aghem
—	DF	ITA	Giulia Beghini
—	DF	ITA	Valentina Capra
—	DF	ITA	Francesca Coluccio
—	DF	ITA	Stefania Favole
—	DF	ITA	Jessica Lettieri
—	DF	ITA	Giada Nicco
—	DF	ITA	Eleonora Rosso
—	DF	ITA	Greta Vallotto
—	DF	ITA	Francesca Welter
—	MF	ITA	Martina Ambrosi

No.	Pos.	Nation	Player
—	MF	ITA	Chiara Eusebio
—	MF	ITA	Annalisa Favole
—	MF	ITA	Sara Malara
—	MF	ITA	Francesca Martin
—	MF	ITA	Giorgia Tudisco
—	FW	ITA	Laura Barberis
—	FW	ITA	Raffaella Barbieri
—	FW	ITA	Giulia Crisantino
—	FW	ITA	Giulia Grassino
—	FW	ITA	Enrica Lupo
—	FW	ITA	Erika Ponzio

=== Former internationals ===
- Brazil: Michael Jackson
- Italy: Barbara Bonansea, Marta Carissimi, Silvia Fuselli, Raffaella Manieri, Patrizia Panico, Simona Sodini, Maria Sorvillo, Tatiana Zorri
- Romania: Camelia Ceasar
- Spain: Ángeles Parejo
