= Federica Cafferata =

Italian footballer (born 2000)

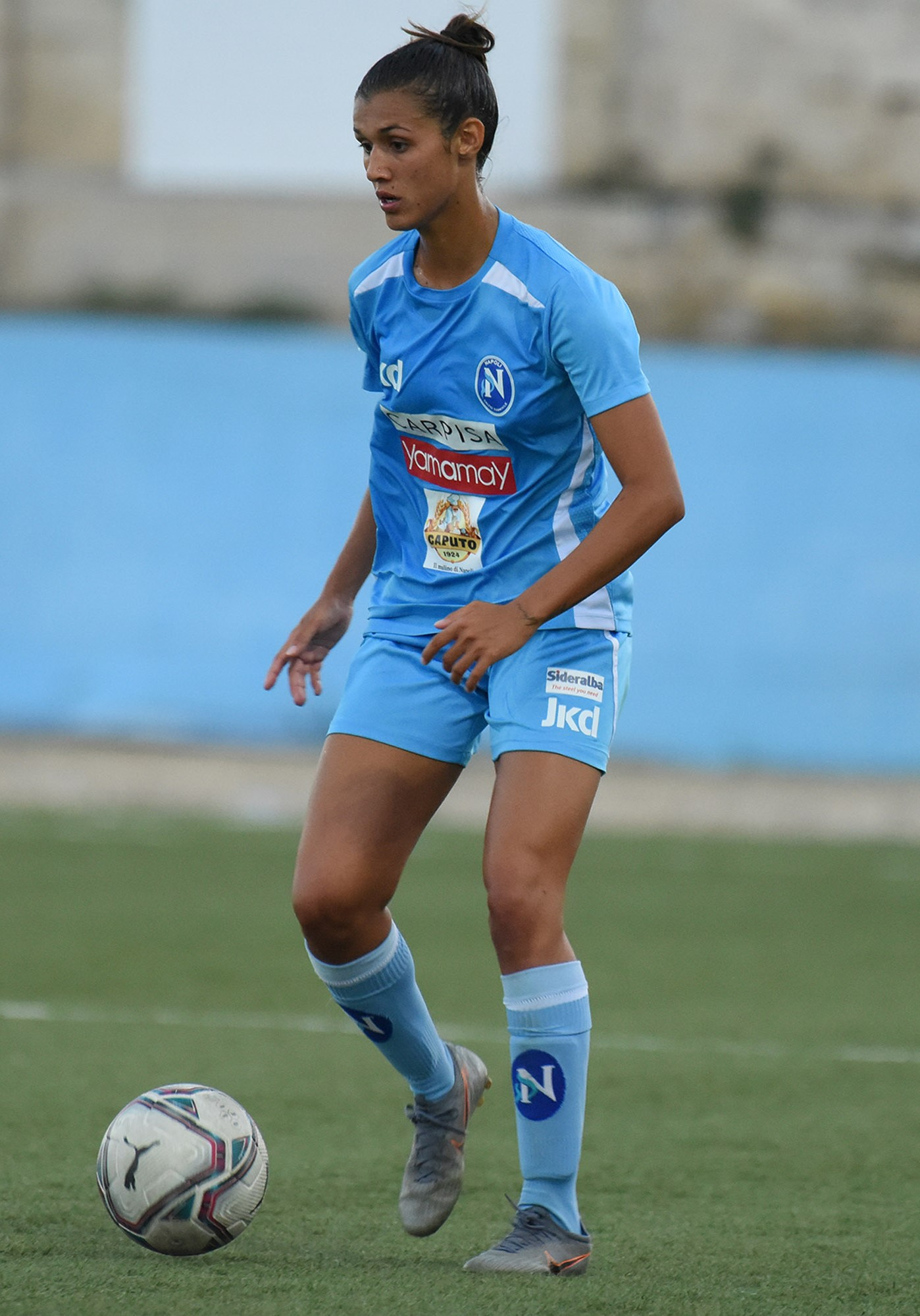
- Cafferata with Napoli in 2020

Personal information
- Date of birth: 7 May 2000 (age 26)
- Place of birth: Genova, Italy
- Position: Defender

Team information
- Current team: Lazio
- Number: 77

Senior career*
Years	Team	Apps	(Gls)
2016–2021	Napoli	20	(1)
2021–2023	Fiorentina	43	(0)
2023–2025	Juventus	2	(0)
2024	→ Sampdoria (loan)	12	(0)
2025–	Lazio	8	(0)

International career
2016–2017	Italy U17	6	(2)
2022–2023	Italy	2	(0)
- * Club domestic league appearances and goals as of 15:14, 9 December 2025 (UTC)

Federica Cafferata (born 7 May 2000) is an Italian professional footballer who plays as a defender for Lazio and the Italy national team.
