= Danish Football Hall of Fame =

Association football hall of fame in Denmark

The Danish Football Hall of Fame (Danish: Fodboldens Hall of Fame) is the national association football hall of fame in Denmark.

The award was established in 2006, as a way to award the best footballers, teams, and coaches throughout the history of the Danish national football team. Beginning in 2008, the award has been handed out at the annual Danish Football Awards. The yearly television broadcast event was originally organized by the DBU in November from 2008 to 2013, and later moved to February. In addition to receiving the award, all Hall of Fame members are invited to leave a footprint in bronze to decorate the entrance hall at the "House of Football" (Danish: Fodboldens hus) at DBU headquarters in Brøndby.

A committee of six people (representing the newspapers, authors of football books, active players of the national team, TV2, the DBU, and a Hall of Fame member), each year has the job to award one or two new members for the Hall of Fame. The six current committee members are Frits Ahlstrøm, Jesper Møller, Michael Laudrup, Katrine Pedersen, Søren Olsen, and Carsten Werge.

When the DBU celebrated its 125-year anniversary in May 2014, it decided to honor the anniversary by awarding nine additional Hall of Fame Members, all playing during the first half of the DBU national team's existence, from 1908 to 1964. Because of financial restraints, the DBU cancelled the planned televised broadcast of the Football Award in February 2015, and for the same reason opted not to award any new Hall of Fame members in this specific year.

== Members ==
=== Players ===
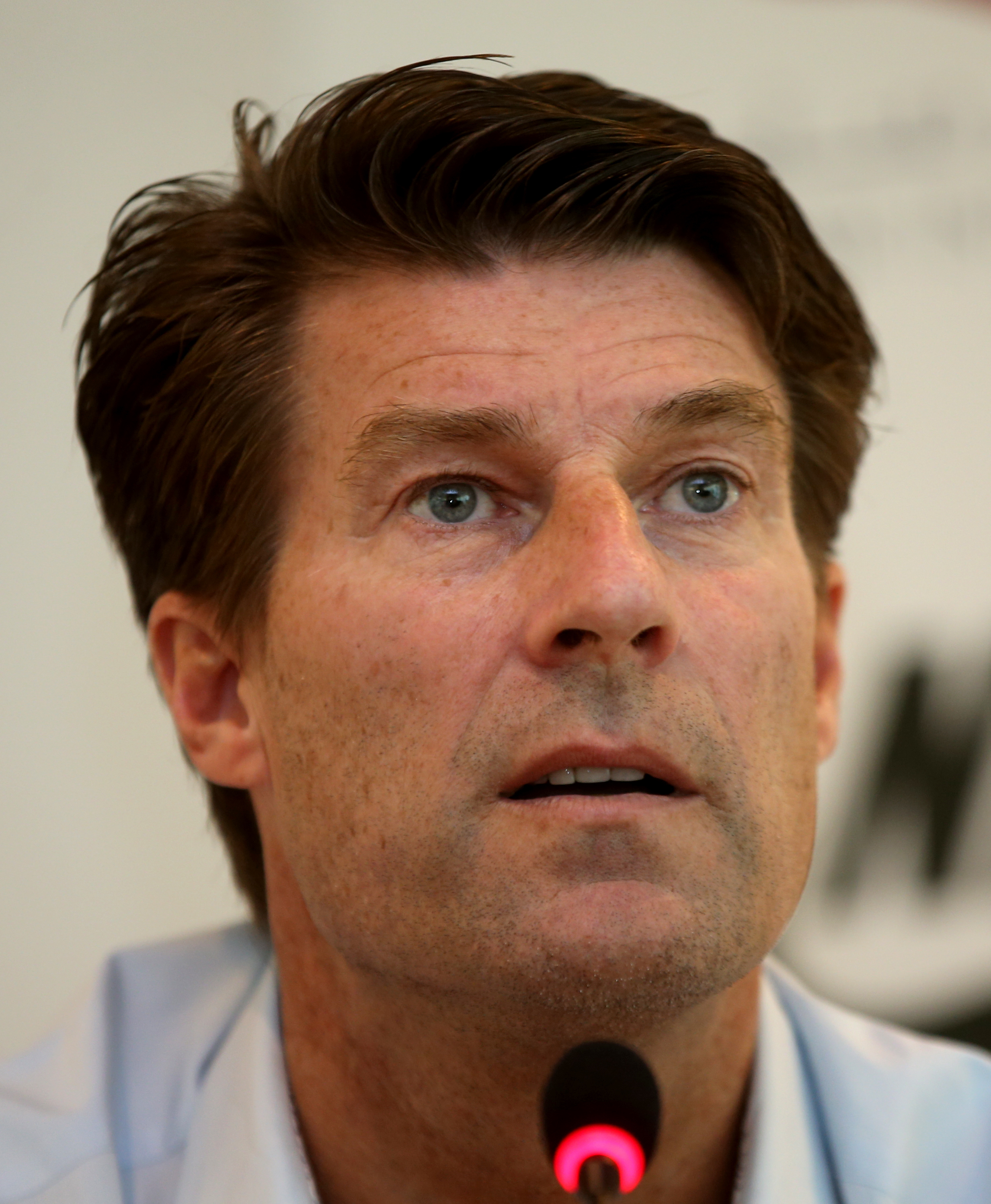
Michael Laudrup was the first inductee

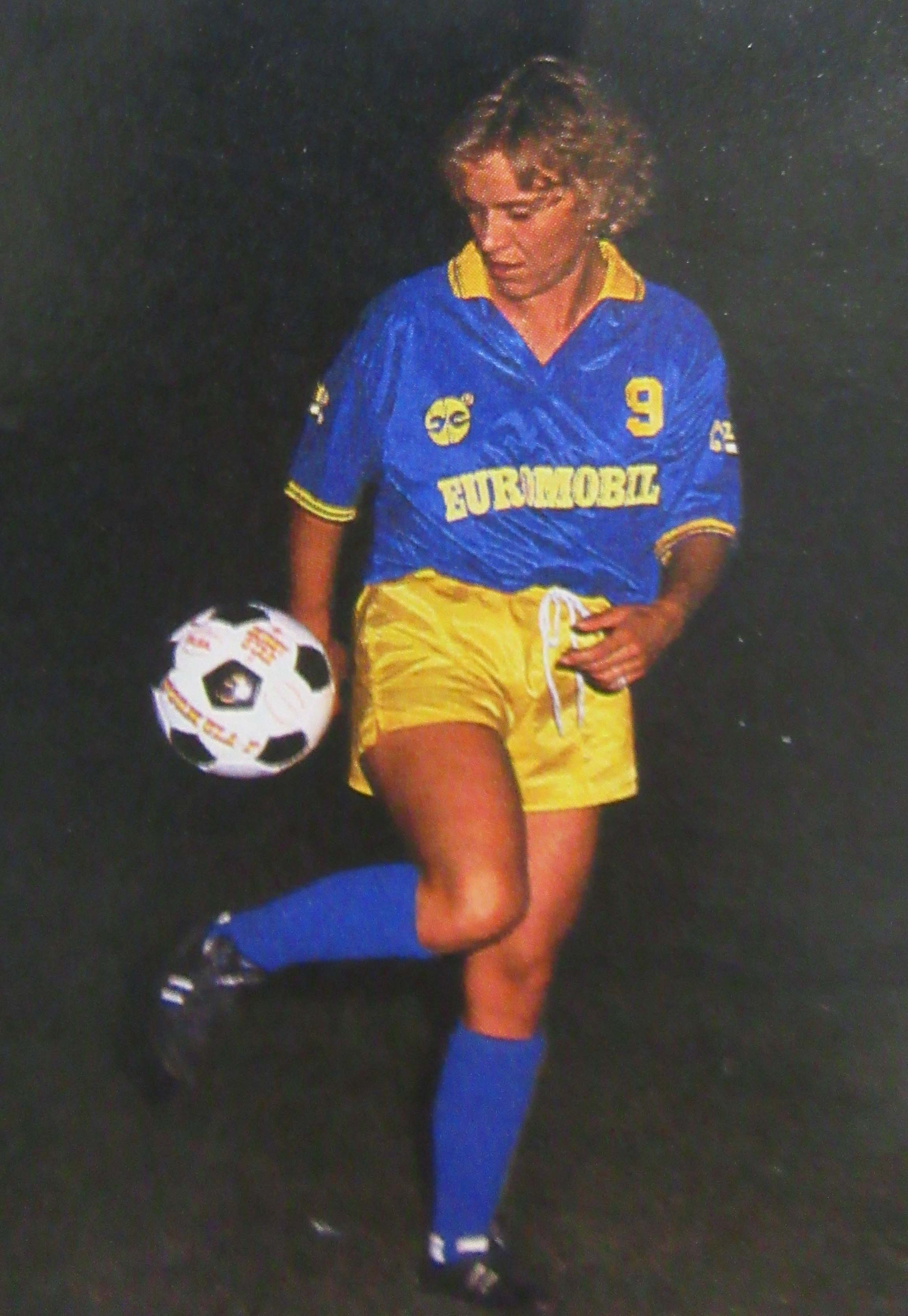
Susanne Augustesen was one of the first women inducted, in 2016

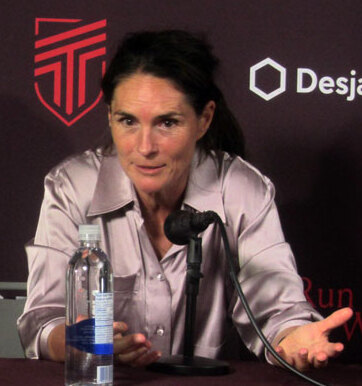
Katrine Pedersen, inducted in 2022, is the women's record holder for caps with 210

Year	Inductee	Position	Years	Apps	Goals	Ref.
2006	Michael Laudrup	MF	1982–1998	104	37	
2008	Allan Simonsen	FW	1972–1986	55	20	
2008	Karl Aage Præst (Note: Spelled as either Karl Aage Præst or Carl Aage Præst)	FW	1945–1949	24	17	
2009	Peter Schmeichel	GK	1987–2001	129	1	
2010	Harald Nielsen	FW	1959–1960	14	15	
2010	Preben Elkjær	FW	1977–1988	69	38	
2011	Per Røntved	DF	1970–1982	75	11	
2012	Brian Laudrup	MF	1987–1998	82	21	
2013	Søren Lerby	MF	1978–1989	67	10	
2013	Frank Arnesen	MF	1977–1987	52	14	
2014	Poul Nielsen	FW	1910–1925	38	52	
2014	Nils Middelboe	MF	1908–1920	15	7	
2014	Sophus Nielsen	FW	1908–1919	20	16	
2014	Sophus Hansen	GK	1911–1920	31	0	
2014	Carl Hansen	FW	1918–1921	7	0	
2014	Pauli Jørgensen	FW	1925–1939	47	44	
2014	Knud Lundberg	FW	1944–1956	38	10	
2014	Eigil Nielsen	GK	1940–1951	28	0	
2014	Poul Pedersen	FW	1953–1964	50	17	
2015	Morten Olsen	DF	1970–1989	102	4	
2015	Henry From	GK	1957–1961	31	0	
2015	Jens Peder Hansen	FW	1949–1961	38	18	
2015	Ole Madsen	FW	1958–1969	50	42	
2015	John Hansen	FW	1948	8	10	
2015	Aage Rou Jensen	FW	1945–1957	30	11	
2016	Karl Aage Hansen	FW	1943–1948	22	17	
2016	Jørgen Leschly Sørensen	FW	1946–1949	14	8	
2016	Henning Enoksen	FW	1958–1967	54	29	
2016	Lone Smidt Nielsen	FW	1977–1988	57	22	
2016	Susanne Augustesen	FW	1971	4	4	
2017	Henning Jensen	FW	1972–1980	21	9	
2019	Johnny Hansen	DF	1965–1978	45	3	
2021	Lars Høgh	GK	1983–1995	8	0	
2022	Ulrik le Fevre	MF	1965–1976	37	7	
2022	Jørgen Olesen	MF	1951–1962	42	2	
2022	Katrine Pedersen	MF	1994–2013	210	9	
2023	Jan Mølby	MF	1982–1990	33	2	
2023	Michael Rohde	FW	1915–1931	40	22	
2023	Fritz Tarp	DF	1918–1934	44	0	
2023	Valdemar Laursen	MF	1918–1934	44	1	
2024	Helle Jensen	FW	1987–1996	77	38	
2024	Merete Pedersen	FW	1993–2009	136	35	
2024	Jon Dahl Tomasson	FW	1997–2010	112	52	
2025	Thomas Helveg	DF	1994–2007	108	2	
2025	Lene Terp	DF	1993–2003	105	4	
2026	Bonny Madsen	DF	1987–1997	70	3	
2026	Karina Sefron	DF	1988–1998	71	0	

=== Managers ===
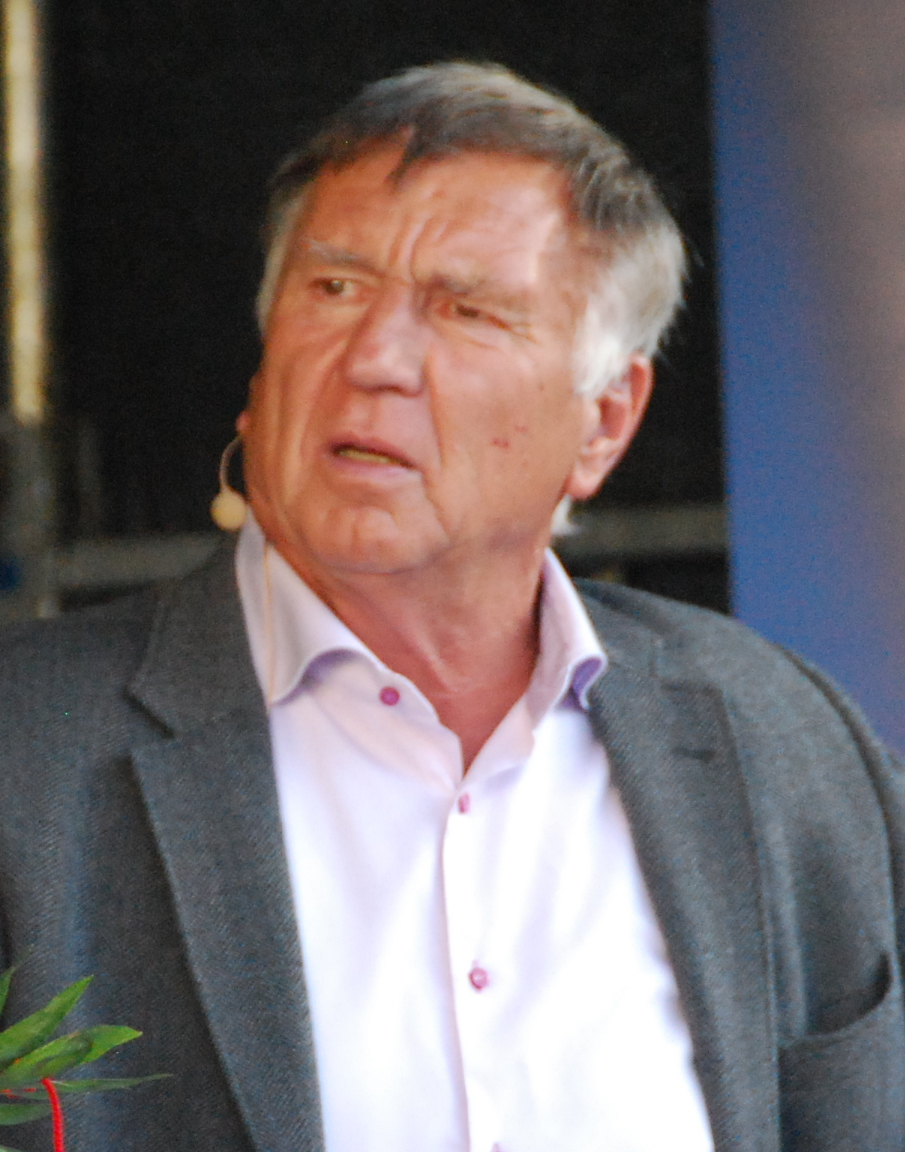
Sepp Piontek was the first manager inducted, in 2011

Year	Inductee	Years as manager	Ref.
2011	Sepp Piontek	1979–1990	
2014	Richard Møller Nielsen	1990–1996	
2025	Poul Højmose	1999–2005	

=== Squads ===
Year	Inductee	Ref.
2006	1992 UEFA Euro men's national team	
2009	1980s men's national team	
2019	1948 Olympic men's national team	
2019	1960 Olympic men's national team	
2019	1971 World Cup women's national team	

== See also ==
- Danish Football Manager of the Year
- Danish Football Player of the Year
- Danish Sports Name of the Year

== Sources ==
- Jensen, Jørgen Nørby (30 October 2025). "Fodboldens Hall of Fame" [Football Hall of Fame]. Lex.dk (in Danish).
