= Menton Tournament =

The Menton Tournament (Tournoi de Menton) is an annual international women's football friendly competition taking place every spring since 1973 in Menton, France. It is organized by local club Étoile Menton.

== Finals ==
Year	Winner	Score	Runner-up
1973	(France) Étoile Menton	3–2	(France) Rouen
1974	(France) Étoile Menton	4–1	(France) Pusignan
1975	(France) Étoile Menton	5–3	(France) Lyon
1976	(Germany) Wörrstadt	4–0	(Socialist Federal Republic of Yugoslavia) Sloga Zemun
1977	(England) Southampton W.F.C.	3–2	(France) Reims
1978	France NT (B)	6–0	(Austria) Landhaus Wien
1979	(France) Saint-Maur	2–1	(France) Saint-Clair
1980	(Sweden) Stattena	2–0	(Italy) Lazio
1981	(Sweden) Sunnanå	2–1	(Belgium) RWD Herentals
1982	(Belgium) Standard Liège	1–0	(Belgium) Cercle Brugge
1983	(Socialist Federal Republic of Yugoslavia) Sloboda Zagreb	1–0	(Belgium) Standard Liège
1984	(Czechoslovakia) Sparta Prague	4–2	(France) Saint-Maur
1985	(Sweden) Trollhättan	?–?	(Switzerland) Bern
1986	(Sweden) Hammarby	3–2	(France) Saint-Maur
1987	(Finland) HJK	0–0 (5-4 p)	(France) Saint-Maur
1988	(Finland) HJK	2–2 (4-1 p)	(France) Étoile Menton
1989	(Socialist Federal Republic of Yugoslavia) Mašinac Niš	3–0	(France) Saint-Maur
1990	(Switzerland) Seebach	3–0	(Belgium) Standard Liège
1991	(Italy) Lazio	1–0	(France) Saint-Maur
1992	(Belgium) Brussel D71	1–0	(Italy) Lazio
1993	(France) Juvisy	0–0 (?-? p)	(Sweden) Landvetter
1994	(Italy) Fiammamonza	0–0 (5-3 p)	(Belgium) Standard Liège
1995	(Italy) Fiammamonza	2–0	(Belgium) Standard Liège
1996	(Belgium) Anderlecht	?–?	(Croatia) Osijek
1997	(Italy) Torino Women	?–?	(Belgium) Anderlecht
1998	United States NT (U18)	2–0	(Belgium) Anderlecht
1999	(Belgium) Anderlecht	0–0 (8-7 p)	(United States) North East XI
2000	(Italy) Torino Women	?–?	(Belgium) Anderelcht
2001	United States NT (U18)	2–0	(Belgium) Anderlecht
2002	(France) Hénin-Beaumont	0–0 (?-? p)	(Switzerland) Seebach
2003	(Netherlands) Ste.Do.Co.	2–0	(Belgium) Anderlecht
2004	(Italy) North West XI	2–0	(Belgium) Anderlecht
2005	(United States) Region I XI	2–0	(Belgium) Standard Liège
2006	(Croatia) Dinamo Maksimir	3–1	(Belgium) Anderlecht
2007	(Croatia) Dinamo Maksimir	1–0	(Italy) Aurora Bergamo
2008	(Italy) Südtirol	2–1	(Croatia) Dinamo Maksimir
2009	(Belgium) Anderlecht	1–0	Tunisia NT
2010	Tunisia NT	?–?	?
2011	(Spain) Oviedo Moderno	1–0	(Canada) Élans Garneau
2012	(Spain) Oviedo Moderno	5–0	(Bulgaria) Olympia Sofia
2013	Tunisia NT	3–2	(Canada) Élans Garneau
2014	Tunisia NT	3–2	(Belarus) FC Bobruichanka
2016	(Belgium) White Star Woluwe	2–1	(France) OGC Nice
