= Susanne Augustesen =

Danish footballer (born 1956)

Susy Augustesen
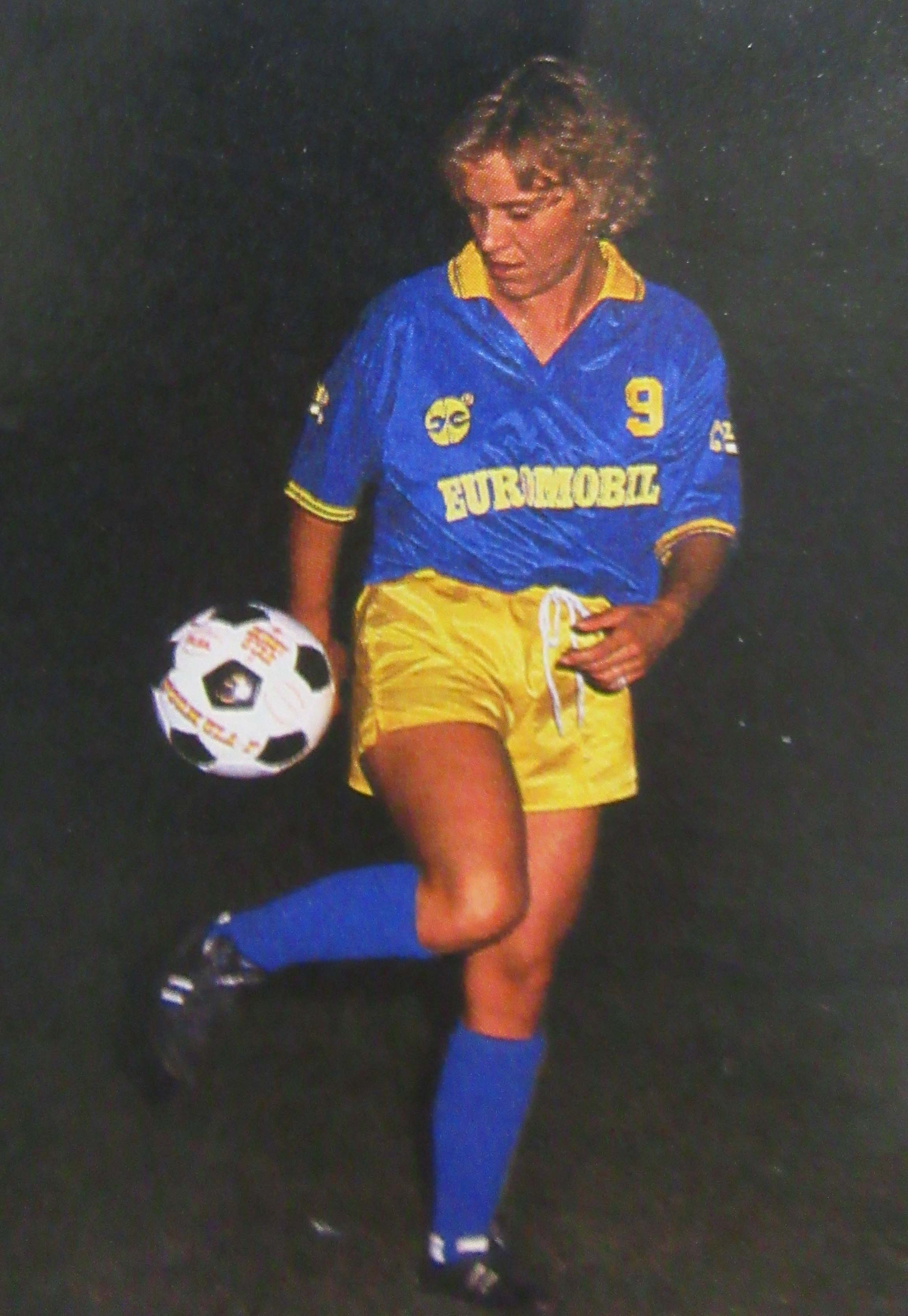
- Augustesen with Modena in 1989

Personal information
- Full name: Susanne Augustesen
- Date of birth: 10 May 1956 (age 70)
- Place of birth: Holbæk, Denmark
- Position: Forward

Senior career*
Years	Team	Apps	(Gls)
1970–1974	Holbæk		
1974	Bologna		
1975	Gamma 3 Padova		
1976–1977	Valdobbiadene		
1978–1979	Conegliano		
1980–1981	Lazio		
1981–1982	Cagliari		
1982–1983	Alaska Lecce		
1983–1985	Lazio		
1985–1988	Trani		
1988–1990	Modena		
1990–1993	Lazio		
1993–1995	Cagliari		

International career
1971	Denmark	4	(4)
Medal record
Women's football
Women's World Cup
Gold medal – first place	1971 Mexico	Team
- * Club domestic league appearances and goals

Susanne "Susy" Augustesen (born 10 May 1956) is a Danish former international footballer who played as a forward at multiple Italian clubs and the Denmark national team.

At age 15, Augustesen participated in the unofficial 1971 Women's World Cup where she represented Denmark. Augustesen made four appearances in the tournament and scored a hat-trick in the final, leading Denmark to victory over hosts Mexico.

Following this historic achievement, Augustesen played football in Denmark for three years before moving to Italy to join Bologna in 1974. She played club football in Italy for more than 20 years. Augustesen was inducted into the Danish Football Hall of Fame in 2017 together with Lone Smidt Nielsen for her career and role as a pioneer of the women's game in Denmark.

== Club career ==
In a professional career spanning some 20 years, Augustesen scored over 600 goals in Italy's top flight. She was the Serie A top goalscorer on eight occasions.

== International career ==
In September 1971, 15-year-old Augustesen scored a hat-trick for Denmark in the final of the unofficial 1971 Women's World Cup. The Danes beat hosts Mexico 3–0 before 110,000 spectators at the Estadio Azteca in Mexico City. Augustesen, who had needed her parents' permission to attend the tournament, scored all three goals with her left foot.

The Danish Football Association (DBU) took over the running of women's football and launched an official national team in 1972. There remained some ambivalence and matches arranged were sporadic. Despite a highly successful professional career in Italy, Augustesen was never called–up to the DBU team.

== Honours ==
National team

- 1971 Women's World Cup

Individual

- 2017 Danish Football Hall of Fame inductee
