= ASD Cuneo Calcio Femminile =

Italian football club

Cuneo
- Full name: Associazione Sportiva Dilettantistica Cuneo Calcio Femminile
- Dissolved: 2017
- Chairperson: Eva Callipo
- League: –
- 2016–17: Serie A, 7th of 12

Associazione Sportiva Dilettantistica Cuneo Calcio Femminile is a women's association football club from Italy. The team competed in the top-level Serie A twice, last in 2016–17. After that season they sold their Serie A licence to Juventus, who were starting a women's professional team. The club only fielded youth teams since afterwards, as an affiliated club of Cuneo.

== History ==
The history of the club began in 1985 in some youth leagues. The name Cuneo Calcio Femminile though only was adopted later after renamings. In the 1990s the club was promoted to the Serie B but did not play there for monetary reasons.

In 2009 Eva Callipo became vice-chairperson and chairperson in 2012. Under her the club finally played the Serie B and won it twice. In its final season in 2016-17 the clubs was spared relegation on the last matchday. After the season the club sold its place to Juventus FC, which the male professional club started their own women team. At the same time Cuneo Calcio Femminile was affiliated to A.C. Cuneo 1905, the male professional club of the city Cuneo .

== Honours ==
- Serie B division champions: 2013–14, 2015–16
