= Emma Martín =

Spanish footballer (born 2002)

Emma Martín Queralt
Personal information
- Full name: Emma Martín Queralt
- Date of birth: 13 August 2002 (age 24)
- Place of birth: Roquetes, Tarragona, Spain
- Position: Midfielder

Team information
- Current team: Lazio
- Number: 8

Senior career*
| Years | Team | Apps | (Gls) |
| 2017–2018 | Cambrils | | |
| 2018–2021 | Alavés | 26+ | (1+) |
| 2021–2022 | Levante Las Planas | | (5+) |
| 2022–2023 | Real Oviedo | | (3+) |
| 2023–2024 | Barcelona B | | (2) |
| 2025 | Valencia | 13 | (2) |
| 2025– | Lazio | 5 | (0) |
- * Club domestic league appearances and goals as of 04:55, 8 December 2025 (UTC)

Emma Martín Queralt (born 13 August 2002) is a footballer who plays as a midfielder for Italian Serie A club Lazio.

== Club career ==
Martín started her career at Cambrils. In 2018, when she was 15, she signed for Deportivo Alavés Gloriosas. On 30 May 2021, the team achieved promotion to the Spanish first league and on 9 October of that year, she had the opportunity to debut in the Spanish Primera División, against the team Sporting de Huelva in a 0–0 draw.

As a consequence of a lack of playing time, in the winter market she signed for the Catalonian team of Levante Las Planas. There she scored five goals. The club was promoted to the first league for the second time, on 29 May.

In the summer market, she signed for Real Oviedo Femenino, where she scored three goals. The team was later demoted to the third Spanish league.

For the 2023–24 season, Martín joined Futbol Club Barcelona Femení B, winning the second division.

On 10 January 2025, Martín was sold by Barcelona to Liga F team Valencia, for an undisclosed fee, returning to the Spanish top flight.

In July 2025, Martín signed for Italian Serie A club Lazio.
