= UCF Padova =

Italian football club

Padova
- Full name: Unione Calcio Padova
- Nickname(s): Biancoscudati (White-Shielded)
- Ground: Stadio Silvio Appiani; Padua, Italy
- Capacity: 24,000
Home colours	Away colours

Unione Calcio Padova, also known as Gamma 3 Padova or A.C.F. Padova, is a former Italian women's footballer who played in Serie A Femminile and Serie B Femminile.

== Honours ==
=== National titles ===
Serie A:

- Winners (2) : 1972, 1973
- Runners-up (3): 1974, 1975, 1977

Coppa Italia:

- Winners (1) : 1974

== Former international players ==
- (Denmark) Susanne Augustesen
- (Spain) Conchi Sánchez
