= Ulla Bastrup =

Danish footballer (born 1959)

Personal information
- Date of birth: 23 December 1959 (age 66)
- Place of birth: Nairobi, Kenya
- Height: 1.68 m (5 ft 6 in)
- Position: Midfielder

Youth career
- –1973: Kolding B

Senior career*
Years	Team	Apps	(Gls)
1974–1980	Kolding B		
1981–1984	B 1909		
1985–1987	A.C.F. Trani 80		
1987–1990	Milan 82		
1990–1992	Fiamma Monza		
1992–1994	Delfino		

International career
1984	Denmark	1	(0)

Managerial career
- 2003–2010: ASI Monza
- 2010–2012: Pro Lissone
- 2013–2016: Fiamma Monza
- * Club domestic league appearances and goals

Ulla Bastrup (born 23 December 1959) is a Danish former footballer and manager who played for A.C.F. Trani 80. After retiring, Bastrup became a coach for Monza.

== International career ==
Bastrup played once for the Denmark women's national football team.

== Literature ==
- Luca Barboni and Gabriele Cecchi, Women's Football Yearbook 1999–2000, Fornacette (PI), Mariposa Editrice S.r.l., November 1999.
