= Emma May Martin =

Canadian artist

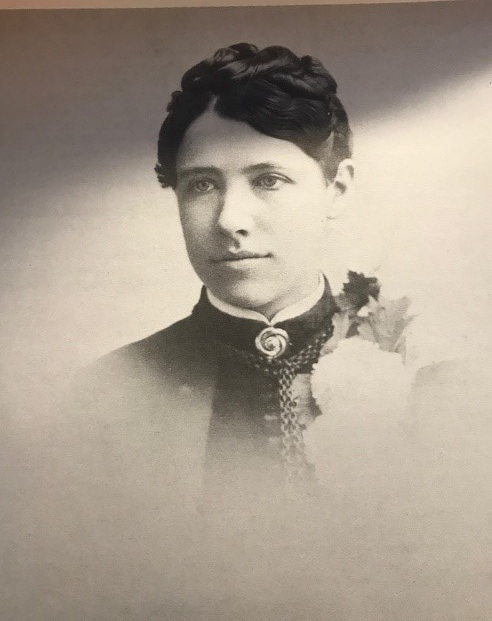
- Image of Emma May Martin as young girl
- Born: January 3, 1865; Toronto
- Died: February 10, 1957 (aged 92)
- Education: Toronto Art School
- Known for: watercolorist

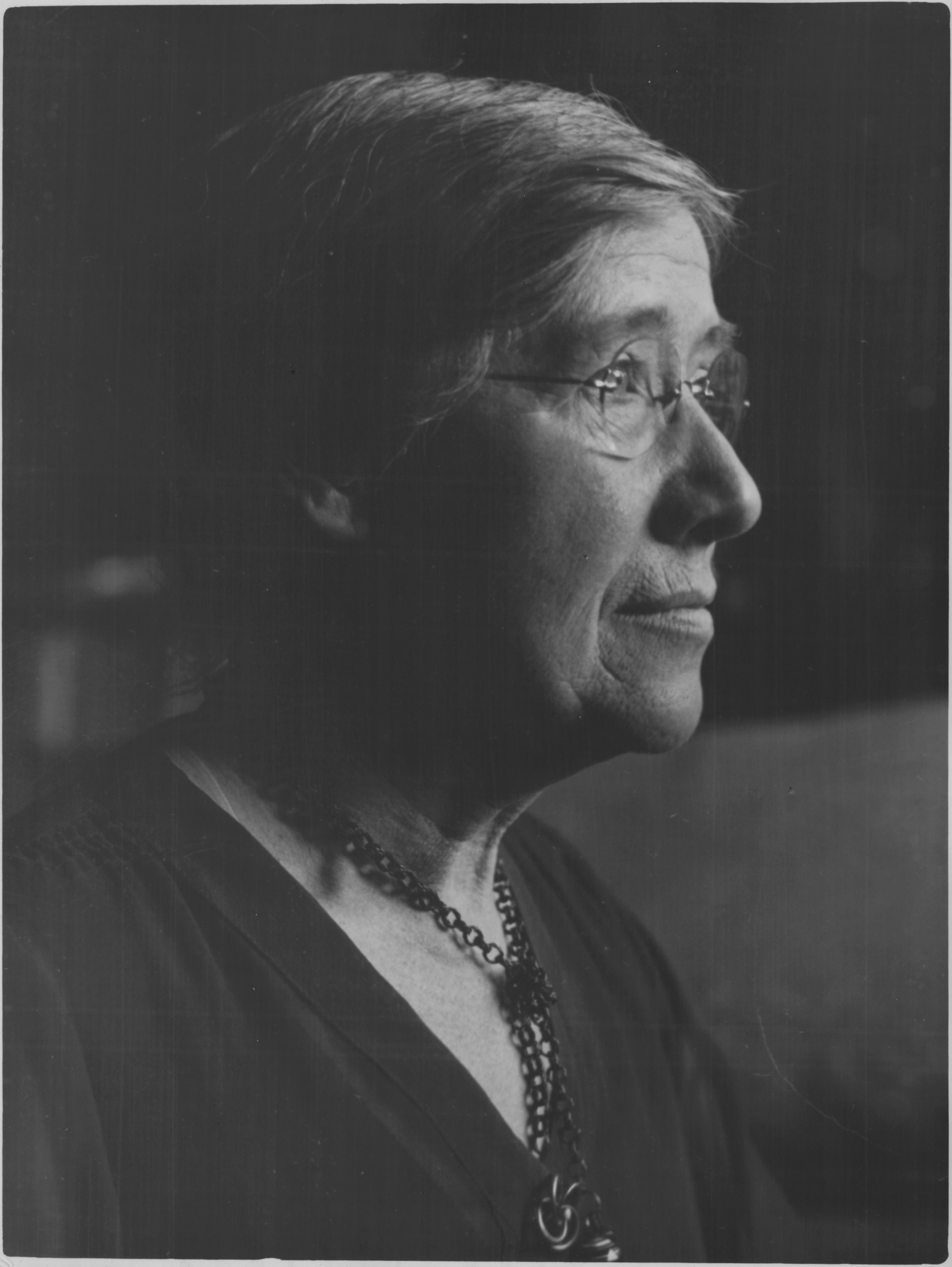
Emma May Martin, Ontario Society of Artists, 1930

Emma May Martin (January 3, 1865 – February 10, 1957) was a Canadian artist best known for her work in watercolor, primarily depicting landscapes and still life scenes. Martin also occasionally worked in oil and china painting.

Born in Toronto Ontario, Martin began her training with her father, Thomas Mower Martin. Martin later studied at the Toronto Art School under Marmaduke Matthews and George Reid. Martin began exhibiting in 1883, and would continue to show her work for the next sixty years. A member of the Ontario Society of Artists, Martin also had a long teaching career, particularly in the field of watercolor.

== Early life ==
Emma May Martin was born on January 3, 1865, in Toronto, Canada West. Her father, Thomas Mower Martin, was a well-known landscape painter, and her mother, Emma Nichols Martin raised nine children, of which Martin was the eldest. The five daughters and four sons of the Martin family were all involved in the arts as children, through exposure to music, painting and writing in their home. Martin and siblings had private tutors as children, and therefore did not partake in any public schooling.

== Training ==
Thomas Mower Martin is credited with introducing his daughter to painting and facilitating her early training. It is noted that he taught her the rudiments of paintings in 1876 and was her teacher until she attended the Toronto Art School, where she studied under Marmaduke Matthews and George Reid.

== Artistic career ==
Martin began exhibiting watercolors in 1883. By 1886 Martin was successfully entering in all of the major Canadian art shows. She exhibited with the Art Association of Montreal from 1885 to 1915, the Toronto Industrial Exhibition (later known as the Canadian National Exhibition) from 1890 to 1897, and the Royal Canadian Academy from 1887 to 1913. Martin was voted into membership with the Ontario Society of Artists in 1889 and exhibited with the group from 1885 to 1925. Martin's work Late Twilight was exhibited at the Chicago World's Fair in 1893.

Due to exhibition records hundreds of Martin's works have been named, however scant first-hand documentation is available. Martin worked primarily in watercolor, choosing to depict mostly landscape and still life scenes. There are notes of her completion of one or two oil paintings, however these are not traceable. A few china painting examples have been found.

Nearly all of Martin's works are signed, making attribution easier. She did not commonly date her works, therefore making it difficult to track her progression. Martin would paint various images of the same area and title them similarly, making it difficult to track the exact number of her works- an example being four separate yet very similar paintings were made of the Ontonabee River. Martin would also hold works back from exhibition for years after they were complete, which has created more difficulties when trying to establish a chronological timeline of her existing works.

== Technique ==
Martin's technique noticeably changed as her career progressed. In her earlier years she favored still life scenes and floral depictions. Her scenes were filled with bright colors and defined details. Further into her career she started to prefer landscape scenes, with her later paintings containing a unique, blurred softness. This technique may have been achieved with the use of a sponge. Martin preferred to work on off-white paper laid down on a board, and would typically outline her images in graphite before applying paint.

Martin stressed the importance of viewing nature first hand when painting it, insisting on travelling to the locations she wished to paint. She would spend large amounts of time studying specific natural elements to recreate them in her paintings. Martin commonly painted flowers and trees from her personal garden, allowing her unrestrained access to her subject matter.

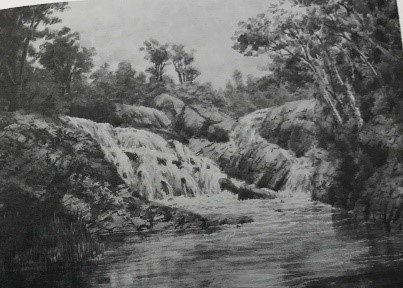
An image painted by Emma May Martin in 1920- Mcdonald's Creek near Sparrow Lake

== Critical reception ==
Early critiques of Martin's work in contemporary newspapers judge the artists work mainly in accordance to her father and his successes. In the early portion of her career her works are not typically mentioned by name in reviews, the consensus being that her father can be proud of her work, and her ability to carry on the family legacy. As Martin's career progressed, she started to be viewed as a separate artist, with her works acknowledged by name in newspaper articles and exhibition reviews.

Martin's work was viewed positively for the most part. Her works were lauded for their use of color and general treatment. Her drawing skills and use of light were also viewed as strengths.

Martin also received some negative critiques. It is noted that some reviewers believed she had difficulties with composition, therefore creating crowded scenes.

== Teaching career ==
Alongside painting, Martin had a long teaching career. She taught painting at the Presbyterian Ladies' College in Toronto from 1889 to 1910. There is potential she taught classes at the Rosedale League Art School as well. Martin did teach private lessons in her own studio, as well as outdoor sketching classes, for the majority of her career.

== Personal life ==
Martin never married. She lived in Toronto for much of her life, first helping raise her siblings, and later her nieces and nephews. After her mother's death in 1911 she also assumed care for her aging father. These familial commitments left her little time to paint.

Martin was comfortably wealthy throughout her life due to her family's position, and therefore never had to work or rely on the sales of her artwork for livelihood. This meant that Martin only painted when the urge struck, and she had the time. Martin treated her art solely as a hobby, even during her later periods of success.

Martin loved to travel and was a member of the Rosedale Travel Club. She commonly travelled through Ontario and Quebec to paint, as well as occasionally branching out to other parts of Canada. She was particularly fond of painting the Muskoka District, as well as Quebec's Eastern Township. She took two documented trips to Europe, one to England and Scotland with Thomas Mower Martin in 1906, and one on her own to England in 1925. The former trip produced many works, which were exhibited between the years of 1912 and 1928.

Martin's main passion besides painting was gardening, and she was a member of Toronto's Horticultural Association. Martin was also a member of the New Jerusalem Church and the Canadian Authors Association. Some sonnets and poems of the artists do exist today.

== Later life and death ==
Martin continued to exhibit works until 1943, when she was in her mid-seventies. After she retired from painting she spent much of her time gardening and researching her family genealogy. Martin's health began to fail in the 1950s, at which time she moved to Montreal, Quebec to live with one of her younger sisters. Martin died in Montreal on February 10, 1957, at the age of 92.

== Legacy ==
Today, Martin's remaining traceable works mainly reside in private collections. One work, Summer Landscape with Geese, is in the public collection at the Art Gallery of Windsor. It is unclear which of Martin's oeuvre remain due to their location.

One posthumous solo exhibition, Water Colours by E. May Martin, was presented at the Robert McLaughlin Gallery in Oshawa, 1980. This continues today to be the only known show solely consisting of Martin's works.
