= ACF Trani 80 =

Italian football team

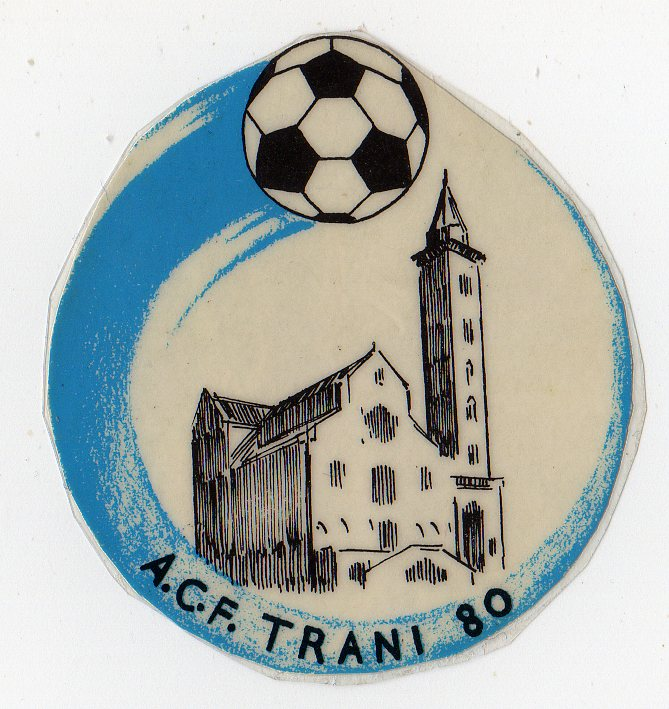
- Full name: Associazione Calcio Femminile Trani 80
- Nicknames: i Biancoazzurre (the White and blues)
- Founded: 1980
- Dissolved: 1988
Home colours

Associazione Calcio Femminile Trani 80 (1980–88) was a professional women's football team from Trani in southern Italy.

It won the Serie A (women's football) ("Scudetto") three times 1984–86 and the Coppa Italia in 1983.

Due to sponsorship, it underwent a series of name changes, before withdrawing from the league ahead of the 1988–89 season. It was not affiliated with the U.S. Calcio Trani men's team.

Playing as ACF Gusmai Trani the club won promotion from Serie B (Girone D) in their second season. In 1982 ACF Marmi Trani finished third in their first season at the top level. They finished second in the 1983 Serie A after losing a play–off to Alaska Lecce, but won the Coppa Italia by beating Tigullio 72 on penalty shoot out after a 1–1 draw.

In 1984 they merged with champions Alaska Lecce to become ACF Alaska Trani, inheriting Lecce's Scottish striker Rose Reilly. That season Trani won the league for the first time, then retained their title in 1985 as ACF Sanitas Trani. After becoming ACF Despar Trani for 1985–86 (following a sponsorship deal with Spar), the club secured a third title. Despar Trani finished second behind Lazio in 1986–87, as did the final incarnation of the club, ACF Trani B.K.V. in 1987–88. The final owner B.K.V., a construction company, lost interest and the club ended.

Trani was defeated in the 1985 and 1988 Coppa Italia finals, by Lazio and Modena, respectively.

The team had many star players, including Carolina Morace. It retains a mythical quality due to its prominent place in the "golden era" of Italian women's football.

== Honours ==
=== National titles ===
Serie A:

- Winners (3) : 1984; 1985; 1985–86
- Runners-up (3): 1983, 1986–87, 1987–88

Coppa Italia:

- Winners (1) : 1983
- Runners-up (2): 1985, 1987–88

=== Former international players ===
- (Denmark) Susanne Augustesen
- (England) Debbie Bampton
- (England) Kerry Davis
- (Republic of Ireland) Anne O'Brien
- (Spain) Conchi Sánchez
- (Denmark) Lone Smidt Hansen
- (Scotland) Rose Reilly
