= Patrizia Caccamo =

Italian footballer (born 1984)

Personal information
- Date of birth: 12 March 1984 (age 42)
- Place of birth: Wickede, West Germany
- Height: 1.59 m (5 ft 3 in)
- Position: Forward

Team information
- Current team: Collerense

Senior career*
Years	Team	Apps	(Gls)
2000–2006	Gravina	54	(42)
2006–2007	Virtus Romagna	17	(27)
2007–2009	Acese	18	(28)
2009–2010	Sezze	7	(5)
2010–2011	Napoli	10	(5)
2011–2012	Acese	18	(22)
2012–2015	Riviera di Romagna	86	(32)
2015–2018	Fiorentina	65	(36)
2018–2019	Atalanta Mozzanica	11	(2)
2019	Vittorio Veneto	7	(2)
2020–	Collerense		

International career^{‡}
2016–	Italy	8	(0)
- * Club domestic league appearances and goals as of 08 August 2019 (UTC) ‡ National team caps and goals as of 13 May 2017

Patrizia Caccamo (born 12 March 1984) is an Italian football forward currently playing for UD Collerense in the Spanish Segunda División Pro. She has also played for Gravina and Riviera di Romagna in Serie A and for Virtus Romagna, Acese, Sezze and Napoli in lower tiers. She has won one championship and one cup, and she is a member of the Italian national team.
