= ACF Prato =

Italian football club

- Full name: Associazione Calcio Femminile Prato
- Nicknames: i Biancoazzurre (the White and blues)
- Founded: 1980
- Dissolved: 1990
- Ground: Stadio Lungobisenzio
- Capacity: 5,000
- President: Silvano Pieralli
Home colours

Associazione Calcio Femminile Prato, known as Prato Wonder for sponsorship reasons, was a professional women's football team from Prato in Tuscany, Italy. Founded in 1980, the club entered Serie A in 1985 after winning two consecutive promotions.

The club was thrown out of the league in November 1990 after failing to fulfil the first four fixtures of the 1990–91 Serie A season.

One of the team's coaches was former Pistoiese player Paolo Bessi.
