= SSD Res Roma =

Italian football club

RES Donna Roma
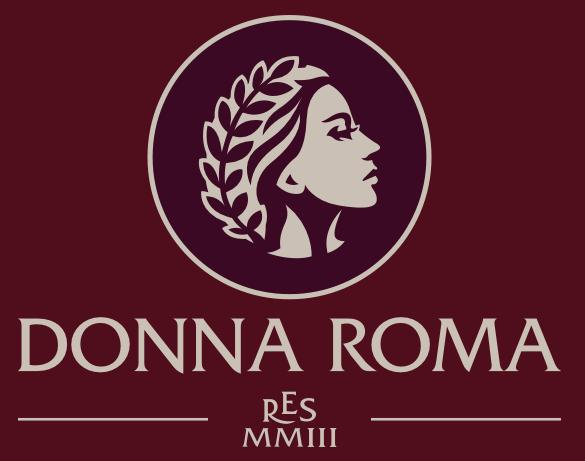
- Full name: RES Donna Roma
- Nickname: Donna Roma
- Founded: 2003
- Ground: Stadio Raimondo Vianello, Rome, Italy
- Capacity: 2,000
- Chairman: Matt Rizzetta
- Head Coach: Alessandro Di Martino
- League: Serie B
- Website: http://www.resdonnaroma.com
Home colours	Away colours

Res Donna Roma, commonly referred to as Donna Roma (Italian: Donna Roma), is an Italian women's football club based in Rome, Italy, currently playing in Serie B, the second tier of Italian football. The club is one of the most successful Italian women's football teams in history, having achieved five top 10 finishes in Serie A.

== History ==
The club was founded in 2003 under the name Res Blu 92 and then was renamed to Res Roma, as a social project to engage young girls from troubled backgrounds in Rome. Res Roma quickly became the principal women's team of Rome and built one of the most successful traditions in Italian women's football. Res Roma competed in Serie A, the highest level of Italian women's football, on five occasions and produced dozens of Italian National Team players and European Cup talent.

In the 2012/13 season, Res Roma finished in first place in Serie A2, earning its first historic promotion to Serie A. The club's success continued in the following seasons under the tutelage of legendary Italian football coach Fabio Melillo, who led Res Roma to five consecutive top 10 finishes in Serie A. Melillo also led the club to two Coppa Italia semifinals and to a fifth-place finish in the Serie A table during the 2016/17 season.

In 2018, the sporting rights of Res Roma were sold to AS Roma and became the modern day women's affiliate of AS Roma. Following the takeover by AS Roma, Res Roma was refounded as an independent club and restarted from Eccellenza, the lowest tier of Italian women's football. The club subsequently won promotions and rose up the pyramid to Serie B, the second highest level of Italian women's football.

== American ownership ==
In 2025, Res Roma was acquired by United States-based Underdog Global Partners, led by entrepreneur and sports executive Matt Rizzetta, who had ownership interests in Campobasso FC and Napoli Basketball, among others. Other executives and advisors joined the ownership group, including NYU professor and sports business pioneer Gina Antoniello; Montreal-based real estate executive Angelo Pasto; Montreal-based executive Nicolas Hien; and American lumber executive Patrick Chovan.

Following its acquisition, new ownership appointed Canadian Italian football coach and executive Marco Masucci to the position of chief executive officer, and former AS Roma women's primavera coach Alessandro Di Martino as manager.

Res Roma was rebranded to Res Donna Roma, commonly known as Donna Roma. A press conference atop the Fendi Building in Rome was hosted in front of 200 attendees on August 13, 2025, to introduce the new Donna Roma identity along with Rizzetta and Masucci's vision to transform Donna Roma into a global destination for women's football in the City of Rome.

Donna Roma kicked off its new era with a historic 2–0 win on the road against Venezia FC. The club currently competes in Serie B with an objective to reach Serie A and compete in European Cup football in the coming years.

== Coaches and presidents ==
- Head coaches: 2003-18 Fabio Melillo / 2018-20 Stefano Fiorucci / 2020-21 Roberto Amore / 2021-24 Marco Galletti / 2025- Alessandro Di Martino
- Presidents: 2003-18 Fabio Melillo / 2018-24 Francesco Sortino / 2025- Matt Rizzetta

== Honors ==
- Primavera League Champions 3: 2014/15, 2015-16, 2016–17
- Italian A2 League Champions 1: 2012–13
- Italian Serie B League Champions 1: 2010–11
- Italian Serie C League Champions 1: 2022–23
- Italian Serie C Regional Champions 1: 2006–07
- Coppa Italia Serie C Lazio Champions 1: 2005–06
- Regional Cup Champions 1: 2005–06
- Coppa Lazio Champions 2: 2003-04, 2005–06
