= CF Euromobil Modena =

Italian football club

Euromobil Modena
- Full name: Calcio Femminile Euromobil Modena
- Nicknames: Giallo Blu (the Yellow and blues)
- Founded: 1975
- Dissolved: 1997
- Ground: Stadio Alberto Braglia
- Capacity: 20,000
- President: Carlo Alberto Corradi
Home colours

Calcio Femminile Euromobil Modena, formerly known as Modena Ritt Jeans for sponsorship reasons, was a professional women's football team from Modena in Emilia-Romagna, Italy. Founded in 1975, the club were promoted to Serie A in 1985 and remained at the top level of women's football in Italy until 1990. The club won the Coppa Italia in 1986 and 1988.

The club folded in 1997, following some time at Serie C level. Meanwhile a separate club from Modena, Modena C.F., played in Serie A from 1996 to 1999, winning the league title in 1996–97 and 1997–98.
