= ACF Milan =

Italian football club

- Full name: Associazione Calcio Femminile Milan
- Nickname: Le Rossonere
- Founded: 1965
- Dissolved: 2013
- Ground: Stadio Sportivo, Milano
- Chairman: Francesco Crudo
Home colours	Away colours

ACF Milan (Associazione Calcio Femminile Milan) was a women's football club based in Milan.

This team had not been concerned with any of the following teams:

- AC Milan (men's team founded in 1899);
  - A.C. Milan Women (known as "Milan Women": (born 2018).
- Associazione Calcio Femminile Milan 82 (known as "Milan 82": born 1982–1994 ceased)
- Mediolanum Milan Associazione Calcio Femminile (known as "Mediolanum Milan": born 2013–2016 ceased)
- Società Sportiva Dilettantistica Football Milan Ladies (known as "Milan ladies": (born 2013–2018 ceased);

== History ==
Founded in 1965, the team won the FFIGC championship in 1970 and remained successful after the unification of the FICF and FFIGC championships into the Serie A, winning two championships and two national cups between 1973 and 1976, including a double in 1975. However the team played most of the 1980s in Serie B. 1988 marked Milan's return to Serie A, but the team subsequently chained two relegations, ending in third-tier Serie C.

In 1994 Milan returned to Serie A, where it remained for the next 15 years. The rossoneri briefly rose to the championship's elite in the late 90s, winning its 3rd Cup and its 4th Championship in 1998 and 1999 respectively, plus two Supercups. However, through the 2000s the team ended usually in mid table positions, with a 3rd spot in 2004 as its best result. In 2009 it was relegated.

After two years in Serie A2, Milan returned to Serie A for the 2011–12 season, but it couldn't avoid relegation. In 2013 the team went into administration then ceased every activity.

== Honours ==
=== Titles ===
- Italian League (4)
  - 1970, 1973, 1975, 1999
- Italian Cup (3)
  - 1975, 1976, 1998
- Italian Supercup (2)
  - 1998, 1999

=== National competition record ===
Season	Division	Place	Coppa Italia	Supercup
1968	1 (UISP)	2nd		
1969	1 (FICF)	9th		
1970	1 (FFIGC)	1st		
1972	1 (FICF)	10th		
1973	1 (FIGCF)	1st		
1974	1	5th		
1975	1	1st	Champion	
1976	1	2nd	Champion	
1977	1	3rd		
1978	1	6th		
1979	1	5th		
1980	1	3rd^{1}		
1981	3	1st		
1982	3 (Gr. Lmb)	1st		
1983	2 (Gr. A)	6th		
1984	2 (Gr. A)	7th		
1985	2 (Gr. B)	4th		
1985–86	2 (Gr. A)	4th		
1986–87	2 (Gr. A)	1st		
1987–88	1	15th		
1988–89	2 (Gr. A)	11th		
1989–90	3 (Gr. Lmb)	1st		
1990–91	2 (Gr. A)	7th		
1991–92	2 (Gr. A)	4th		
1992–93	2 (Gr. A)	4th		
1993–94	2 (Gr. A)	1st		
1994–95	1	11th		
1995–96	1	10th		
1996–97	1	4th		
1997–98	1	4th	Champion	
1998–99	1	1st		Champion
1999–00	1	2nd	Finalist	Champion
2000–01	1	4th	Finalist	
2001–02	1	6th		
2002–03	1	8th		
2003–04	1	3rd		
2004–05	1	7th		
2005–06	1	6th		
2006–07	1	6th		
2007–08	1	9th		
2008–09	1	12th		
2009–10	2 (Gr. A)	4th		
2010–11	2 (Gr. A)	1st		
2011–12	1	11th		
2012–13	2 (Gr. A)	12th		

^{1} Voluntarily relegated

== See also ==
- Category:ACF Milan players
