= SS Lazio Women 2015 =

Italian football team

Lazio
- Full name: Società Sportiva Lazio Women 2015 a r.l.
- Nicknames: Biancocelesti (White and sky blue)
- Founded: 1969; 2015 (as company)
- Ground: Centro sportivo di Formello – Rome, Lazio, Italy
- Capacity: 3,000
- Owner: SS Lazio S.p.A.
- President: Claudio Lotito
- Head Coach: Gianluca Grassadonia
- League: Serie A
- 2025–26: Serie A, 5th of 12
- Website: www.sslazio.it/en
Home colours	Away colours	Third colours

Società Sportiva Lazio Women 2015 a r.l. is an Italian women's football team based in Rome. They currently play in Serie A Femminile.

== History ==
Founded in 1969 as Olimpic Lazio, in 1975, the team became a section of S.S. Lazio multi-sport club.

Consistently finishing in the top four positions through the 1970s, Lazio seemed to emerge as a powerhouse in the last years or the decade winning the Coppa Italia in 1978 and its two first national championships in 1979 and 1980. The second half of the 1980s was also successful, with two further championships (1987, 1988) and cups, including a double in 1987.

Lazio declined throughout the 1990s and narrowly avoided relegation in 1997. However, after changing their name from S.S. Lazio Calcio Femminile to S.S. Ruco Line Lazio Calcio Femminile in 1999, they rose back to win their fifth national championship in the 2001-02 season (plus two additional Cups).

At the end of the season, they were renamed as S.S. Enterprise Lazio Calcio Femminile but this lasted just one season before switching to A.D. Decimum Lazio Femminile in 2003.

In 2006, the team was renamed from A.D. Decimum Lazio Femminile to S.S. Lazio Calcio Femminile. By 2009 they were back in the top flight; despite finishing midtable in 2010, in 2011 the team avoided relegation by just one point.

In September 2015, S.S. Lazio Women 2015 a r.l. was incorporated as a società a responsabilità limitata. This new women's team was a wholly owned subsidiary of the professional male football club S.S. Lazio S.p.A. which originated from but was not owned by S.S. Lazio multi-sport club. They took S.S. Lazio Calcio Femminile's spot in Serie B (who were the original S.S. Lazio women's team).

They finished seventh in their first (2015-16) and second (2016-17) seasons in Group D of Serie B. In 2017-18 they finished second, just 7 points away from first place Roma Calcio Femminile. In 2018-19, the format of Italian football for women was changed. 12 teams composed the league and Lazio Women finished in eighth.

In 2019-20, the season was suspended due to COVID-19. Despite having more points than third place San Marino Academy, because of the formula that was used to calculate each club's final position, they were promoted to Serie A instead of Lazio Women.

In 2020-21, Lazio Women dominated the league and finished in first place to secure promotion to Serie A for the first time. Ashraf Seleman was in charge from rounds 1-14 but was replaced by Carolina Morace on 31 December 2021 and she led the squad for the remainder of the season.

In October 2021, Carolina Morace was dismissed and replaced by Massimiliano Catini.

== Honours ==
=== Official ===
- 5 Italian Leagues (1979, 1980, 1987, 1988, 2002)
- 4 Italian Cups (1978, 1985, 1999, 2003)

=== Invitational ===
- 1 Menton Tournament (1991)
- 1 Italy Women's Cup (2003)

Record in UEFA competitions
Season	Competition	Stage	Result	Opponent
2002–03	UEFA Women's Cup	Group Stage	5–0	(Israel) Maccabi Haifa
2002–03	UEFA Women's Cup	Group Stage	1–1	(France) Toulouse
2002–03	UEFA Women's Cup	Group Stage	5–2	(Hungary) Femina Budapest

== Players ==
=== Current squad ===
As of 7 December 2025

Note: Flags indicate national team as defined under FIFA eligibility rules; some limited exceptions apply. Players may hold more than one non-FIFA nationality.

No.	Pos.	Nation	Player
2	DF	PAN	Carina Baltrip-Reyes
4	MF	ITA	Giulia Mancuso
6	DF	POL	Małgorzata Mesjasz
7	MF	IRL	Megan Connolly
8	MF	ESP	Emma Martín
9	FW	POL	Nikola Karczewska
10	MF	FRA	Alice Benoît
11	MF	FRA	Clarisse Le Bihan
12	GK	FIN	Kerttu Karresmaa
13	DF	ITA	Elisabetta Oliviero
14	DF	ITA	Martina Zanoli (on loan from Fiorentina)
16	MF	ITA	Antonietta Castiello
17	MF	ITA	Margherita Monnecchi

No.	Pos.	Nation	Player
18	MF	ITA	Martina Piemonte
20	MF	ITA	Flaminia Simonetti
22	MF	ENG	Lucy Ashworth-Clifford
23	MF	USA	Nicole Vernis (on loan from Lexington SC)
25	MF	ITA	Eleonora Goldoni
26	DF	ITA	Marta Varriale
27	DF	ITA	Federica D'Auria (on loan from Juventus)
28	GK	ITA	Francesca Durante
77	DF	ITA	Federica Cafferata
91	GK	ITA	Francesca Gregori
99	FW	ITA	Noemi Visentin
—	FW	ESP	Carla Camacho (on loan from Brighton & Hove Albion)

== Non-playing staff ==
- Team Managers: Monica Caprari / Andrea Pulcini / Daniele Morganti
- Head Coach: Massimiliano Catini
- Assistant Coach: Lorenzo Calabria
- Fitness Coach: Lorenzo Marcelli
- Goalkeeping Coach: Francisco Ruiz
- Team Doctors: Daniela Ceccarelli
- Physiotherapists: Daniele Di Paolo / Saverio Venuti

== Former players ==
For details of current and former players, see Category:SS Lazio Women 2015 players.

=== Former internationals ===
- (Denmark) Susanne Augustesen
- (Portugal) Carla Couto
- (England) Kerry Davis
- (Canada) Charmaine Hooper
- (Republic of Ireland) Anne O'Brien
- (Brazil) Thaís Picarte
- (Jamaica) Beverly Ranger
- (Spain) Conchi Sánchez
- (Romania) Florentina Spânu
- (Sweden) Pia Sundhage

== See also ==
- S.S. Lazio
- S.S. Lazio Youth Sector
- S.S. Lazio Calcio a 5
- S.S. Lazio Calcio a 5 (Women)
- Serie A Femminile
- List of women's association football clubs
- List of women's football clubs in Italy
