= Serie A Women =

Women's section of professional association football league in Italy

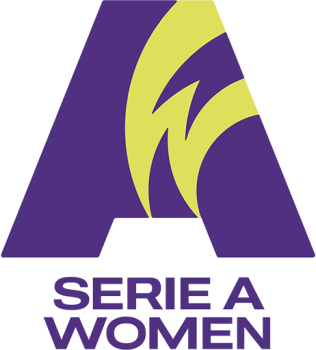
- Organising body: FIGC Divisione Serie A Femminile Professionistica
- Founded: 1968; 58 years ago
- Country: Italy
- Confederation: UEFA
- Number of clubs: 12
- Level on pyramid: 1
- Relegation to: Serie B
- Domestic cup(s): Coppa Italia; Supercoppa Italiana
- League cup: Serie A Women's Cup
- International cup: UEFA Champions League
- Current champions: Roma (3rd title) (2025–26)
- Most championships: Torres (7 titles)
- Website: www.figc.it/it/serie-a-women
- Current: 2026–27 Serie A

The Serie A Women (Italian pronunciation: [ˈsɛːrje ˈa]), also known as the Serie A Women Athora for sponsorship reasons, is the highest league of women's football in Italy. Established in 1968, it has been run by the Italian Football Federation (FIGC) since the 2018–19 season, and currently features 12 teams.

The most successful club in the league's history is Torres, who have won seven times. The current Serie A champions are Juventus who have won their sixth title. As of the 2022–23 edition, the Serie A is ranked fifth in the UEFA women's coefficient, and the top three teams qualify for the UEFA Women's Champions League.

The Serie A became fully-professional from the 2022–23 season, removing the salary cap and allowing teams to pay their players a higher wage. Women's footballers became the first female athletes in Italy to be fully professional. The number of teams also decreased from 12 to 10, though re-increased to 12 teams in the 2025–26 season.

== History ==
=== Background ===
In February 1933, at Via Stoppani 12 in Milan, the Gruppo Femminile Calcistico was founded, considered the first organized women's football club in Italy. Initially, the players wore skirts on the pitch. The initiative lasted approximately nine months. After the publication of a photographic report in the newspaper Calcio Illustrato, other women's teams began to emerge in the country. Reacting to the sport's growing popularity, the Italian National Olympic Committee (CONI) prohibited women from participating in tournaments and friendly matches, redirecting the athletes to track and field.

In 1946, two teams were founded in Trieste: Triestina and San Giusto. In 1950, in Naples, several clubs created the Associazione Italiana Calcio Femminile (AICF), which remained active until its dissolution in 1959. Despite the entity's dissolution, the sport continued to be played unofficially.

In 1965, in Milan, Valeria Rocchi founded two teams with the support of the then-president of Internazionale, Angelo Moratti. During the fourth Inter Club-Pepsi Cola tournament, held at the Arena Civica in Milan, an exhibition match named Bologna versus Inter was played. The teams consisted of young Milanese girls aged between 14 and 17, with Valeria Rocchi acting as both coach and referee. The event received positive coverage in the press and attracted public attention. In September of the same year, a rematch was held with more than a thousand spectators in attendance.

=== Foundation and splits ===
In 1968, the Federazione Italiana Calcio Femminile (FICF, also known as the Viareggio Federation, in reference to the leader of the promoting committee, Mazzoni) was established. The first Italian championship was organized under the entity's management, structured in two groups of five teams. The final, held in Pisa, resulted in Associazione Calcio Femminile Genova winning the title by defeating Roma.

On 31 January 1970, a split occurred when ten clubs left the FICF to found the Federazione Italiana Giuoco Calcio Femminile (FFIGC), under the presidency of lawyer Giovanni Trabucco. In the following season, Trabucco was succeeded by Aleandro Franchi. In 1970, Trabucco's administration had requested recognition of the entity by the Italian Football Federation (FIGC) for eventual affiliation with CONI. However, a commission appointed by the FIGC, chaired by Franco Bettinelli, issued an unfavorable opinion on the request.

In 1972, the two federations merged under the name Federazione Femminile Italiana Unificata Autonoma Giuoco Calcio. However, a dissident group of about fifteen clubs, led by Paolo Savini, recreated the Viareggio Federation under the acronym FIGCF. This federation organized a parallel championship restricted to clubs from Piedmont, Lombardy, Liguria, and Tuscany.

Reunification took place the following season, with the return of the dissident clubs to the main federation. In January 1973, during an Extraordinary Assembly, the entity removed the term "Autonoma" (Autonomous) from its name, becoming the Federazione Femminile Italiana Unificata Giuoco Calcio (FFIUGC). On 16 February 1975, it adopted the name Federazione Italiana Giuoco Calcio Femminile (FIGCF), operating under this nomenclature until its official integration into the FIGC in 1986.

Following the 1972 unification, a qualification championship was organized with 45 teams divided into four groups. In 1973, Serie B ceased to be a strictly regional competition and became a national championship, being called Serie A Interregionale (Inter-regional Serie A) during its first three years.

During its period of independence from the FIGC, the FFIGC recorded an expansion in the number of clubs and competitions. In 1979, a regional championship for youth categories (beginners) was created, which was transformed into Serie D in 1982.

=== FIGC Era ===
The inclusion of women's football into the structure of the FIGC formally occurred in 1986, when the sport was housed under the Lega Nazionale Dilettanti (LND). Starting from the 1986–87 season, commissions were created to regulate the sport, and in 1989 Maurizio Foroni was appointed as the sector's first president.

On 1 May 1997, the Serie A and B teams elected Natalina Ceraso Levati as president of the Women's Football Division. The national structure was then composed of a single-group Serie A (16 teams) and a Serie B divided into three groups (14 teams each). The Supercoppa Italiana was established to be contested between the winner of the Coppa Italia and the Serie A champion. In 1998, Serie B was restructured into four groups, adopting a playoff system to determine the three promotion spots to Serie A. During the same period, regional Under-14 tournaments were implemented to foster the sport's development.

At the 2009 federal assembly, Giancarlo Padovan was elected President of the Women's Football Division.

Starting from the 2018–19 season, the FIGC took over the direct management of the Serie A and Serie B championships. The LND filed a legal appeal in an attempt to retain the organization of the tournaments, but the request was rejected by the sports courts.

=== Professionalisation ===
Although Serie A Femminile traces its origins back to the 1960s, the players maintained the status of amateur athletes for decades. The transition process towards professionalism gained momentum in 2019, driven by the Italian national team's campaign at the 2019 FIFA Women's World Cup, where they reached the quarter-finals. The movement was supported by FIGC President Gabriele Gravina. Later that year, the Senate of the Republic passed an amendment to the 2020 Budget Law, establishing the legal basis for female athletes to become professionals.

On 25 June 2020, the FIGC formally announced that Serie A Femminile would achieve professional status by 2022.

The change in status altered the financial structure and labor rights of the athletes. Previously, there was no standardized salary, and the maximum compensation was capped at €30,658 gross per season. Additional compensations were restricted to travel stipends, flat-rate reimbursements, and performance bonuses, which could not exceed €61.97 per day (for up to five days a week). With professionalisation, the salary cap was abolished, and a minimum annual salary of €26,000 was established for players and coaching staff. Furthermore, the athletes gained access to labor and social security guarantees, including healthcare, pensions, maternity leave, and unemployment benefits, providing greater security in cases of injury or career termination.

Solidifying this transition, starting from the 2022–23 season, the Serie A championship adopted a new format, reducing the number of participants from 12 to 10 teams, and officially began its professional era.

A year later, the FIGC reorganized women's football into two distinct divisions: the Divisione Serie A Femminile Professionistica, responsible for organizing Serie A, the Coppa Italia, the Supercoppa Italiana, and the Campionato Primavera 1; and the Divisione Serie B Femminile, in charge of managing Serie B and the Campionato Primavera 2.

== Promoting equality in football ==
One of the major steps the Italian Olympic Committee is taking to promote equality is encouraging the promotion of women in management roles. One of the ways they plan to do so is by increasing the number of women and girls that participate in sports, and finding more areas for women to become more involved. Furthermore, the Serie A Femminile teams are required to hire people that will ensure the promotion of equality by managing the "women's sectors" of the clubs.

== League format ==
There are two phases per season. 10 teams face one another in a round-robin tournament during the first phase, with 18 total home and away matchdays. The top 5 teams qualify to the championship round (poule scudetto) and the bottom 5 teams compete in the relegation round, in phase two. Both groups of teams begin the second phase with points earned during the first phase. In the second phase, the teams within the group participate in another round-robin tournament, totaling 10 additional home and away matchdays, this time including two rest sessions per team.

The season concludes with the end of the second phase, when the first ranked team in the championship round is considered the winner of Italy, as well as the first and second ranked teams qualify for the UEFA Women's Champion League. The last-ranked team in the relegation round is directly relegated to the Serie B, and the second-to-last ranked team in Serie A relegation round plays the second-ranked Serie B team to try to secure a place in the following Serie A season.

== Clubs ==
Locations of the 2026–27 Serie A Femminile teams

=== 2026–27 season ===
The following ten clubs are competing in the 2026–27 season.

Team	Location	Stadium	Capacity
Como 1907	Erba	Centro Sportivo Lambrone	1,000
FC Como	Seregno	Stadio Ferruccio	2,000
Fiorentina	Bagno a Ripoli	Viola Park	3,000
Inter Milan	Milan (Porta Sempione)	Arena Civica	10,000
Juventus	Biella	Stadio La Marmora-Pozzo	5,827
Lazio	Formello	Centro Sportivo di Formello	3,000
AC Milan	Fiorenzuola d'Arda	Velodromo Attilio Pavesi	4,000
Napoli	Cercola	Stadio Giuseppe Piccolo	3,947
Parma	Noceto	Stadio Il Noce	800
Roma	Rome (EUR)	Stadio Tre Fontane	4,000
Sassuolo	Sassuolo	Stadio Enzo Ricci	4,008
Ternana	Narni	Stadio Moreno Gubbiotti	800

== Champions ==
=== Wins by year ===
Below is a list of previous champions, including those belonging to several independent federations under which the Serie A title was contested before entering the FIGC. Since 1968 all championships were defined as "Serie A":

No.	Season	Champion
1	1968 (FICF)	Genova
1	1968 (UISP)	Bologna
2	1969 (FICF)	ACF Roma
2	1969 (UISP)	Bologna
3	1970 (FFIGC)	Gommagomma
3	1970 (FICF)	Real Torino
4	1971 (FFIGC)	Piacenza
4	1971 (FICF)	Real Juventus
5	1972 (FFIUAGC)	Gamma 3 Padova
6	1973 (FFIUGC)	Gamma 3 Padova
6	1973 (FICF)	Milano
7	1974 (FFIUGC)	Falchi Astro Montecatini
8	1975 (FIGCF)	USF Milan
9	1976 (FIGCF)	Valdobbiadene
10	1977 (FIGCF)	Diadora Valdobbiadene
11	1978 (FIGCF)	Jolly Catania
12	1979 (FIGCF)	Lazio CF Lubiam
13	1980 (FIGCF)	Lazio CF Lubiam
14	1981 (FIGCF)	Alaska Lecce
15	1982 (FIGCF)	Alaska Lecce
16	1983 (FIGCF)	Alaska Lecce

No.	Season	Champion
17	1984 (FIGCF)	Alaska Trani 80
18	1985 (FIGCF)	Sanitas Trani 80
19	1985–86 (FIGCF)	Despar Trani 80
20	1986–87	Lazio CF
21	1987–88	Lazio CF
22	1988–89	Giugliano
23	1989–90	Reggiana Refrattari Zambelli
24	1990–91	Reggiana Refrattari Zambelli
25	1991–92	Milan 82 Salvarani
26	1992–93	Reggiana Refrattari Zambelli
27	1993–94	Torres Fo.S.
28	1994–95	Agliana
29	1995–96	Verona Gunther
30	1996–97	Modena
31	1997–98	Modena
32	1998–99	ACF Milan
33	1999–2000	Torres Fo.S.
34	2000–01	Torres Fo.S.
35	2001–02	Ruco Line Lazio
36	2002–03	Foroni Verona
37	2003–04	Foroni Verona

No.	Season	Champion
38	2004–05	Bardolino Verona
39	2005–06	Fiammamonza
40	2006–07	Bardolino Verona
41	2007–08	Bardolino Verona
42	2008–09	Bardolino Verona
43	2009–10	Torres
44	2010–11	Torres
45	2011–12	Torres
46	2012–13	Torres
47	2013–14	Brescia
48	2014–15	AGSM Verona
49	2015–16	Brescia
50	2016–17	Fiorentina
51	2017–18	Juventus
52	2018–19	Juventus
53	2019–20	Juventus
54	2020–21	Juventus
55	2021–22	Juventus
56	2022–23	Roma
57	2023–24	Roma
58	2024–25	Juventus
59	2025–26	Roma

=== Wins by club ===
Club	Wins	Winning years
Torres	7	1993–94, 1999–2000, 2000–01, 2009–10, 2010–11, 2011–12, 2012–13
Juventus	6	2017–18, 2018–19, 2019–20, 2020–21, 2021–22, 2024–25
Lazio CF	5	1979, 1980, 1986–87, 1987–88, 2001–02
Verona Women	5	2004–05, 2006–07, 2007–08, 2008–09, 2014–15
ACF Milan	4	1970 (FFIGC), 1973 (FICF), 1975, 1998–99
Alaska Lecce	3	1981, 1982, 1983
Trani 80	3	1984, 1985, 1985–86
Reggiana	3	1989–90, 1990–91, 1992–93
Roma	3	2022–23, 2023–24, 2025–26
Bologna	2	1968 (UISP), 1969 (UISP)
Gamma 3 Padova	2	1972, 1973
Diadora Valdobbiadene	2	1976, 1977
Modena	2	1996–97, 1997–98
Foroni Verona	2	2002–03, 2003–04
Brescia	2	2013–14, 2015–16
Genova	1	1968 (FICF)
Roma CF	1	1969 (FICF)
Real Torino	1	1970 (FICF)
Brevetti Gabbiani Piacenza	1	1971 (FFIGC)
Real Juventus	1	1971 (FICF)
Falchi Astro Montecatini	1	1974
Jolly Catania	1	1978
Campania G.B. Giugliano	1	1988–89
Milan 82 Salvarani	1	1991–92
Agliana	1	1994–95
Verona Gunther	1	1995–96
Fiammamonza	1	2005–06
Fiorentina	1	2016–17

== Top scorers ==
Season	Player(s)	Nationality	Club(s)	Goals
1971	Elisabetta Vignotto	Italy	Real Juventus	51
1972	Elisabetta Vignotto	Italy	Gamma 3 Padova	56
1973	Elisabetta Vignotto	Italy	Gamma 3 Padova	25
1974	Elisabetta Vignotto	Italy	Gamma 3 Padova	24
1975	Susanne Augustesen	Denmark	Gamma 3 Padova	29
1976	Susanne Augustesen	Denmark	Valdobbiadene	28
1977	Susanne Augustesen	Denmark	Diadora Valdobbiadene	42
1978	Rose Reilly	Scotland	Jolly Catania	32
1979	Susanne Augustesen	Denmark	Conegliano	29
1980	Elisabetta Vignotto	Italy	Gorgonzola	29
1981	Rose Reilly	Scotland	Alaska Gelati Lecce	31
1982	Susanne Augustesen	Denmark	Flase Cagliari	32
1983	Susanne Augustesen	Denmark	Alaska Gelati Lecce	31
1984	Susanne Augustesen	Denmark	Lazio	25
1985	Carolina Morace	Italy	Lazio	27
1985–86	Lone Hansen	Denmark	Despar Trani 80	26
1986–87	Susanne Augustesen	Denmark	Despar Trani 80	34
1987–88	Carolina Morace	Italy	Lazio	40
1988–89	Carolina Morace	Italy	Lazio	26
1989–90	Carolina Morace	Italy	Reggiana Refrattari Zambelli	38
1990–91	Carolina Morace	Italy	Reggiana Refrattari Zambelli	29
1991–92	Carolina Morace	Italy	Milan Salvarani	31
1992–93	Carolina Morace	Italy	Milan Salvarani	33
1993–94	Carolina Morace	Italy	Torres Fo.S.	33
1994–95	Carolina Morace	Italy	Agliana	31
1995–96	Carolina Morace	Italy	Verona Gunther	39
1996–97	Carolina Morace	Italy	Modena	47
1997–98	Carolina Morace	Italy	Modena	41
1998–99	Patrizia Panico	Italy	Lazio	51
1999–2000	Patrizia Panico	Italy	Ruco Line Lazio	41
2000–01	Patrizia Panico	Italy	Ruco Line Lazio	41
2001–02	Patrizia Panico	Italy	Ruco Line Lazio	47
2002–03	Chiara Gazzoli	Italy	Foroni Verona	54
2003–04	Chiara Gazzoli	Italy	Foroni Verona	34
2004–05	Valentina Boni; Patrizia Panico	Italy; Italy	Bardolino Verona; Torino	32
2005–06	Patrizia Panico	Italy	Torino	24
2006–07	Patrizia Panico	Italy	Bardolino Verona	21
2007–08	Patrizia Panico	Italy	Bardolino Verona	27
2008–09	Patrizia Panico	Italy	Bardolino Verona	23
2009–10	Paola Brumana	Italy	Graphistudio Tavagnacco	24
2010–11	Patrizia Panico; Daniela Sabatino	Italy; Italy	Torres; Brescia	26
2011–12	Patrizia Panico	Italy	Torres	29
2012–13	Patrizia Panico	Italy	Torres	35
2013–14	Patrizia Panico	Italy	Torres	43
2014–15	Patrizia Panico	Italy	AGSM Verona	34
2015–16	Valentina Giacinti	Italy	Mozzanica	32
2016–17	Lana Clelland	Scotland	Tavagnacco	23
2017–18	Valentina Giacinti	Italy	Brescia	21
2018–19	Valentina Giacinti	Italy	AC Milan	21
2019–20	Cristiana Girelli	Italy	Juventus	16
2020–21	Cristiana Girelli	Italy	Juventus	22
2021–22	Daniela Sabatino	Italy	Fiorentina	15
2022–23	Tabitha Chawinga	Malawi	Inter Milan	23
2023–24	Evelyne Viens	Canada	Roma	13
2024–25	Cristiana Girelli	Italy	Juventus	19
2025–26	Tessa Wullaert	Belgium	Inter Milan	14
