= 2007–08 UEFA Women's Cup qualifying round =

Tournament details
- Dates: 9 August–16 September 2007
- Teams: 45

The 2007–08 UEFA Women's Champions League qualifying round was played on 9, 11, 14 August 2007 and 11, 13 and 16 September 2007. A total of 45 teams competed in the qualifying round to decide the 8 places in the knockout phase of the 2007–08 UEFA Women's Cup.

== First qualifying round ==
=== Group A1 ===
Played in Šiauliai and Pakruojis, Lithuania.

Pos	Team	Pld	W	D	L	GF	GA	GD	Pts	Qualification	EVE	ZUC	GUN	GLE
1	(England) Everton	3	3	0	0	20	0	+20	9	Advance to second qualifying round	—	–	4–0	11–0
2	(Switzerland) Zuchwil	3	2	0	1	11	6	+5	6		0–5	—	–	5–1
3	(Lithuania) Gintra-Universitetas (H)	3	1	0	2	2	11	−9	3		–	0–6	—	–
4	(Northern Ireland) Glentoran	3	0	0	3	2	18	−16	0		–	–	1–2	—

Source: RSSSFGroup A1
(H) Hosts
9 August 2007

Zuchwil (Switzerland)	5–1	(Northern Ireland) Glentoran
Zahno 43'; Marti 50', 81'; Šundov 67'; Gatto 83'	Report	Quigley 90+2'

Savivaldybė Stadium, Šiauliai
Referee: Tanja Subotič (Slovenia)
9 August 2007

Everton (England)	4–0	(Lithuania) Gintra-Universitetas
Evans 31'; Handley 35'; Easton 65'; Unitt 90'	Report

Savivaldybė Stadium, Šiauliai
Referee: Yuliya Medvedeva-Keldyusheva (Kazakhstan)

11 August 2007

Everton (England)	11–0	(Northern Ireland) Glentoran
Westwood 11'; Williams 15'; Kane 21', 47', 50'; Handley 48'; Evans 54'; McDougall 55'; Duggan 63', 72'; Johnson 70'	Report

Savivaldybė Stadium, Šiauliai
Referee: Ann-Helen Østervold (Norway)
11 August 2007

Gintra-Universitetas (Lithuania)	0–6	(Switzerland) Zuchwil
	Report	Šundov 15', 40'; Gysin 17'; Zahno 89'; Lehmann 90+1'; Gatto 90+2'

Savivaldybė Stadium, Šiauliai
Referee: Tanja Subotič (Slovenia)

14 August 2007

Zuchwil (Switzerland)	0–5	(England) Everton
	Report	Williams 16', 41'; Whelan 31'; Handley 43', 57'

Savivaldybė Stadium, Šiauliai
Referee: Ann-Helen Østervold (Norway)
14 August 2007

Glentoran (Northern Ireland)	1–2	(Lithuania) Gintra-Universitetas
Giltesple 54'	Report	Kudytė 11' (pen.); Sviderkyte 78'

Pakruojis Stadium, Pakruojis
Referee: Yuliya Medvedeva-Keldyusheva (Kazakhstan)

=== Group A2 ===
Played in Toftir and Tórshavn, Faroe Islands.

Pos	Team	Pld	W	D	L	GF	GA	GD	Pts	Qualification	VAL	HON	ADH	KIK
1	(Iceland) Valur	3	3	0	0	13	2	+11	9	Advance to second qualifying round	—	2–1	–	6–0
2	(Finland) FC Honka	3	2	0	1	6	3	+3	6		–	—	1–0	–
3	(Netherlands) ADO Den Haag	3	0	1	2	2	7	−5	1		1–5	–	—	1–1
4	(Faroe Islands) KÍ Klaksvík (H)	3	0	1	2	2	11	−9	1		–	1–4	–	—

Source: RSSSFGroup A2
(H) Hosts
9 August 2007

Valur (Iceland)	2–1	(Finland) FC Honka
Stefanović 87'; Viðarsdóttir 90+1'	Report	Vartiainen 31'

Svangaskarð, Toftir
Referee: Ivana Kosturova (Slovakia)
9 August 2007

ADO Den Haag (Netherlands)	1–1	(Faroe Islands) KÍ Klaksvík
Van Eyck 34'	Report	Olafsdóttir 67'

Svangaskarð, Toftir
Referee: Sabine Bonnin (France)

11 August 2007

FC Honka (Finland)	1–0	(Netherlands) ADO Den Haag
Lyytikäinen 89'	Report

Svangaskarð, Toftir
Referee: Ivana Kosturova (Slovakia)
11 August 2007

Valur (Iceland)	6–0	(Faroe Islands) KÍ Klaksvík
Logadóttir 39'; Viðarsdóttir 51' (pen.), 65'; Óðinsdóttir 54'; Jónsdóttir 60'; Kristinsdóttir 68'	Report

Svangaskarð, Toftir
Referee: Hilda McDermott (Republic of Ireland)

14 August 2007

ADO Den Haag (Netherlands)	1–5	(Iceland) Valur
Van Eyck 90'	Report	Viðarsdóttir 9', 22' (pen.); Brynjarsdóttir 39'; Kristinsdóttir 75', 85'

Svangaskarð, Toftir
Referee: Hilda McDermott (Republic of Ireland)
14 August 2007

KÍ Klaksvík (Faroe Islands)	1–4	(Finland) FC Honka
Josephsen 40'	Report	Laihanen 7', 20'; Saari 82'; Patawary 88' (o.g.)

Tórsvøllur, Tórshavn
Referee: Sabine Bonnin (France)

=== Group A3 ===
Played in Neulengbach and Sankt Pölten, Austria.

Pos	Team	Pld	W	D	L	GF	GA	GD	Pts	Qualification	NEU	HIB	GCZ	MAY
1	(Austria) Neulengbach (H)	3	3	0	0	15	4	+11	9	Advance to second qualifying round	—	4–3	–	3–0
2	(Scotland) Hibernian	3	2	0	1	15	5	+10	6		–	—	4–1	–
3	(Poland) Gol Częstochowa	3	1	0	2	6	13	−7	3		1–8	–	—	4–1
4	(Republic of Ireland) Mayo Ladies League	3	0	0	3	1	15	−14	0		–	0–8	–	—

Source: RSSSFGroup A3
(H) Hosts
9 August 2007

Gol Częstochowa (Poland)	4–1	(Republic of Ireland) Mayo Ladies League
Otrębska 4', 90+2'; Stobba 49', 83'	Report	Staunton 69'

Wienerwaldstadion, Neulengbach
Referee: Paula Thörn (Sweden)
9 August 2007

Neulengbach (Austria)	4–3	(Scotland) Hibernian
Celouch 12', 47'; Rosana 45'; Gstöttner 69'	Report	Little 7'; Grant 55'; Hamill 89'

Wienerwaldstadion, Neulengbach
Referee: Aneliya Sinabova (Bulgaria)

11 August 2007

Hibernian (Scotland)	4–1	(Poland) Gol Częstochowa
Ross 26'; Grant 60', 65', 85'	Report	Stobba 36'

Wienerwaldstadion, Neulengbach
Referee: Venera Muradova (Azerbaijan)
11 August 2007

Neulengbach (Austria)	3–0	(Republic of Ireland) Mayo Ladies League
Burger 7', 45'; Novotny 33'	Report

Wienerwaldstadion, Neulengbach
Referee: Paula Thörn (Sweden)

14 August 2007

Gol Częstochowa (Poland)	1–8	(Austria) Neulengbach
Gibek 90+1'	Report	Burger 13', 72', 78' (89); Gstöttner 14', 39', 55'; Faustenhammer 41'

Wienerwaldstadion, Neulengbach
Referee: Venera Muradova (Azerbaijan)
14 August 2007

Mayo Ladies League (Republic of Ireland)	0–8	(Scotland) Hibernian
	Report	Kennedy 7'; Little 33', 55', 60', 90+1'; Kerr 45'; Ross 52', 77'

Stadtsportanlage, Sankt Pölten
Referee: Aneliya Sinabova (Bulgaria)

=== Group A4 ===
Played in Osijek, Croatia.

Pos	Team	Pld	W	D	L	GF	GA	GD	Pts	Qualification	WEZ	DEZ	OSI	CAR
1	(Belgium) Rapide Wezemaal	3	3	0	0	5	0	+5	9	Advance to second qualifying round	—	–	2–0	2–0
2	(Portugal) 1.º de Dezembro	3	2	0	1	9	1	+8	6		0–1	—	7–0	–
3	(Croatia) Osijek (H)	3	1	0	2	2	10	−8	3		–	–	—	2–1
4	(Wales) Cardiff City	3	0	0	3	1	6	−5	0		–	0–2	–	—

Source: RSSSFGroup A4
(H) Hosts
9 August 2007

Rapide Wezemaal (Belgium)	2–0	(Wales) Cardiff City
Verelst 13'; Van Malenstein 79'	Report

Gradski Vrt Stadium, Osijek
Referee: Jana Adámková (Czech Republic)
9 August 2007

1.º de Dezembro (Portugal)	7–0	(Croatia) Osijek
Couto 39'; Fernandes 41', 55'; Lourido 57'; Pinto 69'; Nunes 73'; Costa 90+3'	Report

Gradski Vrt Stadium, Osijek
Referee: Jana Adámková (Czech Republic)

11 August 2007

Cardiff City (Wales)	0–2	(Portugal) 1.º de Dezembro
	Report	Costa 32'; Couto 71'

Gradski Vrt Stadium, Osijek
Referee: Teodora Albon (Romania)
11 August 2007

Rapide Wezemaal (Belgium)	2–0	(Croatia) Osijek
Van Malenstein 6'; Meykens 85'	Report

Gradski Vrt Stadium, Osijek
Referee: Jana Adámková (Czech Republic)

14 August 2007

1.º de Dezembro (Portugal)	0–1	(Belgium) Rapide Wezemaal
	Report	Heiremans 85'

Zeleno Polje, Osijek
Referee: Teodora Albon (Romania)
14 August 2007

Osijek (Croatia)	2–1	(Wales) Cardiff City
Kusar 38'; Kolar 66'	Report	Miller 75'

Gradski Vrt Stadium, Osijek
Referee: Knarik Grigoryan (Armenia)

=== Group A5 ===
Played in Ljubljana and Domzale.

Pos	Team	Pld	W	D	L	GF	GA	GD	Pts	Qualification	BAR	NES	KRK	BIR
1	(Italy) Bardolino	3	3	0	0	22	0	+22	9	Advance to second qualifying round	—	1–0	–	16–0
2	(Spain) Athletic Club Neskak	3	2	0	1	20	1	+19	6		–	—	4–0	16–0
3	(Slovenia) KRKA Novo Mesto (H)	3	1	0	2	5	10	−5	3		0–5	–	—	–
4	(Malta) Birkirkara	3	0	0	3	1	37	−36	0		–	–	1–5	—

Source: RSSSFGroup A5
(H) Hosts
9 August 2007

Athletic Club Neskak (Spain)	4–0	(Slovenia) KRKA Novo Mesto
Ferreira 68'; Murua 79'; Díez 81'; Vázquez 89'	Report

Šiška Sports Park, Ljubljana
Referee: Irina Tereshchenko (Russia)
9 August 2007

Bardolino (Italy)	16–0	(Malta) Birkirkara
Vicchiarello 2', 26'; Mangion 6' (o.g.); Tuttino 13', 31'; Gabbiadini 15', 29', 53'; Boni 32', 36', 67'; Panico 49', 72', 73'; Girelli 85'; Motta 87'	Report

Domžale Sports Park, Domžale
Referee: Tetiana Aseeva (Ukraine)

11 August 2007

Athletic Club Neskak (Spain)	16–0	(Malta) Birkirkara
Iturregi 2'; Vázquez 21', 25', 49', 55', 60', 64', 72'; Murua 26'; Olabarrieta 40', 62'; Sánchez 53'; Juaristi 80', 85', 89'; Díez 90'	Report

Šiška Sports Park, Ljubljana
Referee: Irina Tereshchenko (Russia)
11 August 2007

KRKA Novo Mesto (Slovenia)	0–5	(Italy) Bardolino
	Report	Panico 21', 40'; Boni 49'; Tuttino 54'; Vicchiarello 61'

Domžale Sports Park, Domžale
Referee: Florence Guillemin (France)

14 August 2007

Bardolino (Italy)	1–0	(Spain) Athletic Club Neskak
Gabbiadini 11'	Report

Šiška Sports Park, Ljubljana
Referee: Florence Guillemin (France)
14 August 2007

Birkirkara (Malta)	1–5	(Slovenia) KRKA Novo Mesto
Chetham 53'	Report	Milenkovič 7', 41'; Benak 13'; Govek 45', 48'

Domžale Sports Park, Domžale
Referee: Tetiana Aseeva (Ukraine)

=== Group A6 ===
Played in Strumica, North Macedonia.

Pos	Team	Pld	W	D	L	GF	GA	GD	Pts	Qualification	LYO	SFK	SKI	SDŠ
1	(France) Lyon	3	3	0	0	29	0	+29	9	Advance to second qualifying round	—	–	10–0	12–0
2	(Bosnia and Herzegovina) SFK Sarajevo	3	2	0	1	4	8	−4	6		0–7	—	–	–
3	(North Macedonia) Skiponjat (H)	3	1	0	2	4	13	−9	3		–	2–1	—	3–1
4	(Slovakia) Slovan Šaľa	3	0	0	3	1	17	−16	0		–	0–2	–	—

Source: RSSSFGroup A6
(H) Hosts
9 August 2007

Lyon (France)	12–0	(Slovakia) Slovan Šaľa
Abily 7', 50'; Nécib 22', 55', 85'; Henry 29'; Cilene 31', 45', 80'; Renard 40'; Kolenová 61' (o.g.); Brétigny 64'	Report

Stadion Blagoj Istatov, Strumica
Referee: Marianne Svendsen (Denmark)
9 August 2007

Skiponjat (North Macedonia)	2–1	(Bosnia and Herzegovina) SFK Sarajevo
Fetahović 18'; Skrbić 87'	Report	Salihi 36'

Stadion Kukuš, Strumica
Referee: Christine Bango (Austria)

11 August 2007

Lyon (France)	10–0	(North Macedonia) Skiponjat
Cruz 11', 65'; Simone 21'; Thomis 24', 34', 63'; Nécib 27'; Brétigny 49', 56', 80'	Report

Stadion Blagoj Istatov, Strumica
Referee: Sandra Bastos (Portugal)
11 August 2007

Slovan Šaľa (Slovakia)	0–2	(Bosnia and Herzegovina) SFK Sarajevo
	Report	Spahić 36'; Fetahović 42'

Stadion Kukuš, Strumica
Referee: Christine Bango (Austria)

14 August 2007

SFK Sarajevo (Bosnia and Herzegovina)	0–7	(France) Lyon
	Report	Nécib 7'; Cilene 20', 31', 76'; Dusang 37'; Bompastor 52', 88'

Stadion Blagoj Istatov, Strumica
Referee: Sandra Bastos (Portugal)
14 August 2007

(North Macedonia) Skiponjat	3–1	(Slovakia) Slovan Šaľa
Latifovik 5'; Berisa 54'; Stojanoska 86'	Report	Mandáková 52'

Stadion Kukuš, Strumica
Referee: Marianne Svendsen (Denmark)

=== Group A7 ===
Played in Krasnoarmeysk and Schelkov.

Pos	Team	Pld	W	D	L	GF	GA	GD	Pts	Qualification	ROS	KHA	NKR	DTB
1	(Russia) Rossiyanka (H)	3	3	0	0	28	0	+28	9	Advance to second qualifying round	—	–	7–0	18–0
2	(Ukraine) Zhytlobud-1 Kharkiv	3	2	0	1	18	5	+13	6		0–3	—	2–4	14–0
3	(Serbia) Napredak Kruševac	3	1	0	2	8	13	−5	3		–	–	—	–
4	(Georgia (country)) Dinamo Tbilisi	3	0	0	3	2	38	−36	0		–	–	2–6	—

Source: RSSSFGroup A7
(H) Hosts
9 August 2007

Zhytlobud-1 Kharkiv (Ukraine)	14–0	(Georgia (country)) Dinamo Tbilisi
Djatel 31', 36', 38', 54', 77', 85', 90+1'; Sukhorukova 42', 88'; Nesterenko 44', 55', 66', 83'; Andrushchak 90'	Report

Stadion Rossiyanka, Krasnoarmeysk
Referee: Christina Westrum Pedersen (Norway)
9 August 2007

Rossiyanka (Russia)	7–0	(Serbia) Napredak Kruševac
Shlyapina 38', 75'; Skotnikova 42'; Pekur 46'; Kremleva 47'; Barbashina 70', 89'	Report

Stadion Rossiyanka, Krasnoarmeysk
Referee: Caroline De Boeck (Belgium)

11 August 2007

Zhytlobud-1 Kharkiv (Ukraine)	2–4	(Serbia) Napredak Kruševac
Besić 45'; Malimić 73'	Report	Djatel 39', 88'; Sukhorukova 76'; Masalska 78'

Stadion Rossiyanka, Krasnoarmeysk
Referee: Eleni Kiriou (Greece)
11 August 2007

Rossiyanka (Russia)	18–0	(Georgia (country)) Dinamo Tbilisi
Pekur 5', 36', 38', 52', 61'; Barbashina 13', 42'; Shlyapina 25', 33', 34', 82'; Tsybutovich 45'; Petrova 48'; Kremleva 58', 59', 68'; Morozova 71'; Kozhnikova 79'	Report

Stadion Rossiyanka, Krasnoarmeysk
Referee: Christina Westrum Pedersen (Norway)

14 August 2007

Zhytlobud-1 Kharkiv (Ukraine)	0–3	(Russia) Rossiyanka
	Report	Kozhnikova 35'; Barbashina 50'; Shlyapina 71'

Stadion Rossiyanka, Krasnoarmeysk
Referee: Christina Westrum Pedersen (Norway)
14 August 2007

(Georgia (country)) Dinamo Tbilisi	2–6	Napredak Kruševac (Serbia)
Tchkonia 20', 75'	Report	Karadžić 6'; Malimić 17', 43', 71'; Vasić 54'; Todorović 85'

Podmoskovie Stadium, Shchyolkovo
Referee: Eleni Kiriou (Greece)

=== Group A8 ===
Played in Thessaloniki, Greece.

Pos	Team	Pld	W	D	L	GF	GA	GD	Pts	Qualification	UVI	NSA	PAOK	PAR
1	(Belarus) Universitet Vitebsk	3	3	0	0	12	0	+12	9	Advance to second qualifying round	—	–	4–0	6–0
2	(Bulgaria) NSA Sofia	3	1	1	1	5	5	0	4		0–2	—	–	3–1
3	(Greece) PAOK (H)	3	1	1	1	5	8	−3	4		–	2–2	—	–
4	(Estonia) Pärnu JK	3	0	0	3	3	12	−9	0		–	–	2–3	—

Source: RSSSFGroup A8
(H) Hosts
9 August 2007

NSA Sofia (Bulgaria)	3–1	(Estonia) Pärnu JK
Boyanova 34'; Strezova 73'; Tsekova 78'	Report	Morkovkina 14'

National Athletics Centre, Stavroupolis
Referee: Amy Rayner (England)
9 August 2007

Universitet Vitebsk (Belarus)	4–0	(Greece) PAOK
Buzinova 13', 55'; Malinovskaya 71'; Gromolyuk 77'	Report

Toumba Stadium, Thessaloniki
Referee: Mihaela Gurdon Basimamović (Croatia)

11 August 2007

Universitet Vitebsk (Belarus)	6–0	(Estonia) Pärnu JK
Malinovskaya 16', 45'; Manzhuk 20'; Ryzhevich 26', 33'; Saar 76' (o.g.)	Report

National Athletics Centre, Stavroupolis
Referee: Mayte Porro Araico (Spain)
11 August 2007

PAOK (Greece)	2–2	(Bulgaria) NSA Sofia
Tselekoglou 77'; Tsiapanou 90+7'	Report	Boyanova 44'; Tsekova 90+2'

Toumba Stadium, Thessaloniki
Referee: Amy Rayner (England)

14 August 2007

NSA Sofia (Bulgaria)	0–2	(Belarus) Universitet Vitebsk
	Report	Ryzhevich 39'; Buzinova 83'

National Athletics Centre, Stavroupolis
Referee: Mayte Porro Araico (Spain)
14 August 2007

Pärnu JK (Estonia)	2–3	(Greece) PAOK
Morkovkina 8', 13'	Report	Kotta 20'; Tsiapanou 44', 79'

Toumba Stadium, Thessaloniki
Referee: Mihaela Gurdon Basimamović (Croatia)

=== Group A9 ===
Played in Orhei and Chișinău, Moldova.

Pos	Team	Pld	W	D	L	GF	GA	GD	Pts	Qualification	ALM	FEM	NCH	R93
1	(Kazakhstan) Alma	3	3	0	0	13	1	+12	9	Advance to second qualifying round	—	–	5–0	5–0
2	(Hungary) Femina	3	2	0	1	9	3	+6	6		1–3	—	–	6–0
3	(Moldova) Narta Chişinău (H)	3	1	0	2	3	8	−5	3		–	0–2	—	–
4	(Azerbaijan) Ruslan-93	3	0	0	3	1	14	−13	0		–	–	1–3	—

Source: RSSSFGroup A9
(H) Hosts
9 August 2007

Femina (Hungary)	6–0	(Azerbaijan) Ruslan-93
Jakab 6', 23'; Pádár 13', 63', 90'; Smuczer 35'	Report

Zimbru Stadium, Chișinău
Referee: Anni Charlotte Anja Kunick (Germany)
9 August 2007

Alma (Kazakhstan)	5–0	(Moldova) Narta Chişinău
Yalova 7', 26', 82'; Aniskovtseva 58' (pen.); Ivanova 77'	Report

CSR Orhei, Orhei
Referee: Silvia Spinelli (Italy)

11 August 2007

Alma (Kazakhstan)	5–0	(Azerbaijan) Ruslan-93
Yalova 28', 90+1'; Aniskovtseva 31'; Saratovtseva 50'; Svetlitskaia 81'	Report

Zimbru Stadium, Chișinău
Referee: Laurence Zeien (Luxembourg)
11 August 2007

Narta Chişinău (Moldova)	0–2	(Hungary) Femina
	Report	Pádár 18'; Sebestyén 32'

CSR Orhei, Orhei
Referee: Silvia Spinelli (Italy)

14 August 2007

Femina (Hungary)	1–3	(Kazakhstan) Alma
Krisztin 86'	Report	Yalova 7'; Li 17'; Aniskovtseva 53'

Zimbru Stadium, Chișinău
Referee: Anni Charlotte Anja Kunick (Germany)
14 August 2007

Ruslan-93 (Azerbaijan)	1–3	(Moldova) Narta Chişinău
Hajiyeva 84'	Report	Paduraru 6'; Dragomir 30'; Ninicu 81'

CSR Orhei, Orhei
Referee: Laurence Zeien (Luxembourg)

=== Group A10 ===
Played in Holon, Jerusalem and Rishon Le-Zion, Israel.

Pos	Team	Pld	W	D	L	GF	GA	GD	Pts	Qualification	SPR	CLU	MHO	KOK
1	(Czech Republic) Sparta Prague	3	2	1	0	24	4	+20	7	Advance to second qualifying round	—	1–1	–	19–0
2	(Romania) Clujana Cluj-Napoca	3	2	1	0	15	1	+14	7	Advance to second qualifying round	–	—	3–0	–
3	(Israel) Maccabi Holon	3	1	0	2	8	8	0	3		3–4	–	—	5–1
4	(Cyprus) AEK Kokkinochorion	3	0	0	3	1	35	−34	0		–	0–11	–	—

Source: RSSSFGroup A10
9 August 2007

(Czech Republic) Sparta Prague	1–1	(Romania) Clujana Cluj-Napoca
Martínková 86'	Report	Spânu 22'

Haberfeld Stadium, Rishon LeZion
Referee: Hilal Tuba Tosun (Turkey)
9 August 2007

(Israel) Maccabi Holon	5–1	(Cyprus) AEK Kokkinochorion
Ohana 17', 63'; Erez 25'; Sofer 43'; Redman 90+1'	Report	Mouskos 53'

Municipal Stadium, Holon
Referee: Carina Vitulano (Italy)

11 August 2007

(Czech Republic) Sparta Prague	19–0	(Cyprus) AEK Kokkinochorion
Bertholdová 6', 13', 32'; Martínková 25', 37', 39'; Ondrušová 33', 53'; Pivoňková 43'; Knavová 57'; Martínková 64'; Kladrubská 69', 70'; Došková 72', 85'; Heroldová 83', 89', 90'; Ringelová 90+1'	Report

Municipal Stadium, Holon
Referee: Marina Mamaeva (Russia)
11 August 2007

(Romania) Clujana Cluj-Napoca	3–0	(Israel) Maccabi Holon
Birtoiu 13', 30'; Laiu 64'	Report

Teddy Stadium, Jerusalem
Referee: Carina Vitulano (Italy)

14 August 2007

Maccabi Holon (Israel)	3–4	(Czech Republic) Sparta Prague
Ohana 6'; Redman 8'; Bertholdová 40' (o.g.)	Report	Martínková 24'; Kladrubská 54'; Ringelová 74'; Bertholdová 81'

Teddy Stadium, Jerusalem
Referee: Marina Mamaeva (Russia)
14 August 2007

AEK Kokkinochorion (Cyprus)	0–11	(Romania) Clujana Cluj-Napoca
	Report	Spânu 4', 62'; Sucila 19', 60'; Olar 38'; Laiu 39', 53'; Striblea 44', 54', 80'; Sârghe 47'

Haberfeld Stadium, Rishon LeZion
Referee: Hilal Tuba Tosun (Turkey)

== Second qualifying round ==
=== Group B1 ===
Played in Borehamwood and St Albans, England.

Pos	Team	Pld	W	D	L	GF	GA	GD	Pts	Qualification	ARS	BAR	NEU	ALM
1	(England) Arsenal (H)	3	2	1	0	14	3	+11	7	Advance to quarter-finals	—	–	7–0	4–0
2	(Italy) Bardolino	3	2	1	0	11	6	+5	7	Advance to quarter-finals	3–3	—	3–2	–
3	(Austria) Neulengbach	3	1	0	2	5	10	−5	3		–	–	—	3–0
4	(Kazakhstan) Alma	3	0	0	3	1	12	−11	0		–	1–5	–	—

Source: RSSSFGroup B1
(H) Hosts
11 October 2007

Bardolino (Italy)	3–2	(Austria) Neulengbach
Panico 47'; Tuttino 61'; Boni 75'	Report	Celouch 29'; Gstöttner 58'

Meadow Park, Borehamwood
Referee: Ausra Kance (Lithuania)
11 October 2007

Arsenal (England)	4–0	(Kazakhstan) Alma
Carney 21', 25'; Chapman 32'; Sanderson 45'	Report

Meadow Park, Borehamwood
Referee: Eva Ödlund (Sweden)

13 October 2007

Arsenal (England)	7–0	(Austria) Neulengbach
Ludlow 9', 31'; Fleeting 28', 36'; Carney 33'; Chapman 71'; Grant 79'	Report

Clarence Park, St Albans
Referee: Ausra Kance (Lithuania)
13 October 2007

Alma (Kazakhstan)	1–5	(Italy) Bardolino
Kirgizbaeva 70'	Report	Panico 10', 52'; Gabbiadini 33'; Boni 68'; Manier 85'

Clarence Park, St Albans
Referee: Snjezana Focic (Croatia)

16 October 2007

Bardolino (Italy)	3–3	(England) Arsenal
Gabbiadini 49'; Manieri 59'; Panico 90+2'	Report	Fleeting 27'; Sanderson 48'; Smith 85'

Meadow Park, Borehamwood
Referee: Eva Ödlund (Sweden)
16 October 2007

Neulengbach (Austria)	3–0	(Kazakhstan) Alma
Burger 28', 47'; Rosana 90+2'	Report

Clarence Park, St Albans
Referee: Snjezana Focic (Croatia)

=== Group B2 ===
Played in Umeå, Sweden.

Pos	Team	Pld	W	D	L	GF	GA	GD	Pts	Qualification	UME	ROS	UVI	CLU
1	(Sweden) Umeå (H)	3	2	1	0	7	3	+4	7	Advance to quarter-finals	—	–	2–0	3–1
2	(Russia) Rossiyanka	3	2	1	0	7	4	+3	7	Advance to quarter-finals	2–2	—	3–1	–
3	(Belarus) Universitet Vitebsk	3	1	0	2	2	5	−3	3		–	–	—	1–0
4	(Romania) Clujana Cluj-Napoca	3	0	0	3	2	6	−4	0		–	1–2	–	—

Source: RSSSFGroup B2
(H) Hosts
11 October 2007

Rossiyanka (Russia)	3–1	(Belarus) Universitet Vitebsk
Petrova 5'; Tsybutovich 36'; Morozova 87'	Report	Malinovskaya 46'

Gammliavallen, Umeå
Referee: Mayte Porro Araico (Spain)
11 October 2007

Umeå (Sweden)	3–1	(Romania) Clujana Cluj-Napoca
Klaveness 14', 29' (pen.); Edlund 83'	Report	Ilinca 61'

Gammliavallen, Umeå
Referee: Dagmar Damkova (Czech Republic)

14 October 2007

(Romania) Clujana Cluj-Napoca	1–2	(Russia) Rossiyanka
Ilinca 73'	Report	Shlyapina 30'; Petrova 78'

Gammliavallen, Umeå
Referee: Dagmar Damkova (Czech Republic)
14 October 2007

(Sweden) Umeå	2–0	(Belarus) Universitet Vitebsk
Pedersen 51', 70'	Report

Gammliavallen, Umeå
Referee: Anna De Toni (Italy)

16 October 2007

(Belarus) Universitet Vitebsk	1–0	(Romania) Clujana Cluj-Napoca
Shevchuk 18'	Report

Gammliavallen, Umeå
Referee: Mayte Porro Araico (Spain)
16 October 2007

(Russia) Rossiyanka	2–2	(Sweden) Umeå
Barbashina 52', 56'	Report	Marta 26' (pen.), 40'

Gammliavallen, Umeå
Referee: Anna De Toni (Italy)

=== Group B3 ===
Played in Bierbeek, Belgium.

Pos	Team	Pld	W	D	L	GF	GA	GD	Pts	Qualification	FRA	WEZ	EVE	VAL
1	(Germany) Frankfurt	3	2	1	0	6	3	+3	7	Advance to quarter-finals	—	–	2–1	3–1
2	(Belgium) Rapide Wezemaal (H)	3	1	1	1	3	6	−3	4	Advance to quarter-finals	1–1	—	2–1	–
3	(England) Everton	3	1	0	2	5	5	0	3		–	–	—	3–1
4	(Iceland) Valur	3	1	0	2	6	6	0	3		–	4–0	–	—

Source: RSSSFGroup B3
(H) Hosts
11 October 2007

Frankfurt (Germany)	3–1	(Iceland) Valur
Prinz 80'; Wimbersky 87', 90'	Report	Viðarsdóttir 42'

Albert Ombelet 1, Bierbeek
Referee: Gordana Kuzmanović (Serbia)
11 October 2007

Rapide Wezemaal (Belgium)	2–1	(England) Everton
Verelst 70', 90+1'	Report	Evans 50'

Albert Ombelet 1, Bierbeek
Referee: Tanja Schett (Austria)

13 October 2007

Frankfurt (Germany)	2–1	(England) Everton
Prinz 30'; Pohlers 90+2'	Report	Williams 5'

Albert Ombelet 1, Bierbeek
Referee: Floarea Babadac (Romania)
13 October 2007

Valur (Iceland)	4–0	(Belgium) Rapide Wezemaal
Jónsdóttir 55'; Óðinsdóttir 65'; Viðarsdóttir 67', 79'	Report

Albert Ombelet 1, Bierbeek
Referee: Tanja Schett (Austria)

16 October 2007

Everton (England)	3–1	(Iceland) Valur
Handley 41'; Dowie 52', 54'	Report	Jónsdóttir 60'

Albert Ombelet 1, Bierbeek
Referee: Gordana Kuzmanović (Serbia)
16 October 2007

Rapide Wezemaal (Belgium)	1–1	(Germany) Frankfurt
Torreele 21'	Report	Meykens 35' (o.g.)

Albert Ombelet 1, Bierbeek
Referee: Floarea Babadac (Romania)

=== Group B4 ===
Played in Lyon and Bron, France.

Pos	Team	Pld	W	D	L	GF	GA	GD	Pts	Qualification	BRØ	LYO	KOL	SPR
1	(Denmark) Brøndby	3	2	1	0	3	1	+2	7	Advance to quarter-finals	—	0–0	–	2–1
2	(France) Lyon (H)	3	2	1	0	3	1	+2	7	Advance to quarter-finals	–	—	1–0	–
3	(Norway) Kolbotn	3	1	0	2	3	3	0	3		0–1	–	—	3–1
4	(Czech Republic) Sparta Prague	3	0	0	3	3	7	−4	0		–	1–2	–	—

Source: RSSSFGroup B4
(H) Hosts
11 October 2007

Brøndby (Denmark)	0–0	(France) Lyon
	Report

Stade de Gerland, Lyon
Referee: Maaren Olander (Estonia)
11 October 2007

Kolbotn (Norway)	3–1	(Czech Republic) Sparta Prague
Angus 3'; Gulbrandsen 70', 73'	Report	Kladrubská 62'

Stade Pierre Duboeuf, Bron
Referee: Claudine Brohet (Belgium)

13 October 2007

Brøndby (Denmark)	2–1	(Czech Republic) Sparta Prague
Matysová 49' (o.g.); Jensen 82'	Report	Mouchová 21'

Stade Pierre Duboeuf, Bron
Referee: Natalia Avdonchenko (Russia)
13 October 2007

Lyon (France)	1–0	(Norway) Kolbotn
Abily 10'	Report

Stade de Gerland, Lyon
Referee: Maaren Olander (Estonia)

16 October 2007

Kolbotn (Norway)	0–1	(Denmark) Brøndby
	Report	Brogaard 90+1'

Stade Pierre Duboeuf, Bron
Referee: Natalia Avdonchenko (Russia)
16 October 2007

Sparta Prague (Czech Republic)	1–2	(France) Lyon
Bertholdová 80'	Report	Abily 50'; Renard 55'

Stade de Gerland, Lyon
Referee: Claudine Brohet (Belgium)
