= 2007 in Norwegian football =

Football in Norway
- Season: 2007

Men's football
- Tippeligaen: Brann
- 1. divisjon: Molde
- 2. divisjon: Nybergsund (Group 1); Hødd (Group 2); Sandnes Ulf (Group 3); Alta (Group 4)
- Cupen: Lillestrøm

Women's football
- Toppserien: Røa
- 1. divisjon: Fart
- Cupen: Røa

The 2007 in Norwegian football season was the 102nd season of competitive football in Norway.

== Men's football ==
=== League season ===
==== Promotion and relegation ====
League	Promoted to league	Relegated from league
Tippeligaen	Strømsgodset; Aalesund	HamKam; Molde
1. divisjon	Notodden; Skeid; Mandalskameratene; Raufoss	Pors Grenland; Manglerud Star; Follo; Hødd
2. divisjon	Fredrikstad 2; Strømmen; FF Lillehammer; Mjøndalen; Asker; Arendal; Stavanger; Os; Averøykameratene; Nardo; Mjølner; Tromsø 2	Tollnes; Ørn-Horten; Årdal; Molde 2; Kolstad; KIL/Hemne; Kopervik; Stord Sunnhordland; Klepp; HamKam 2; Brumunddal; Steigen

==== Tippeligaen ====
Pos	Team	Pld	W	D	L	GF	GA	GD	Pts	Qualification or relegation
1	Brann (C)	26	17	3	6	59	39	+20	54	Qualification for the Champions League second qualifying round
2	Stabæk	26	14	6	6	53	35	+18	48	Qualification for the UEFA Cup second qualifying round
3	Viking	26	14	5	7	50	40	+10	47	Qualification for the UEFA Cup first qualifying round
4	Lillestrøm	26	12	8	6	47	28	+19	44	Qualification for the UEFA Cup second qualifying round (Note: Lillestrøm qualified for the UEFA Cup second qualifying round by winning the Norwegian Cup. Their spot in the Intertoto Cup was passed down to Rosenborg, the first team in the table not already qualified for any European competition.)
5	Rosenborg	26	12	5	9	53	39	+14	41	Qualification for the Intertoto Cup second round
6	Tromsø	26	12	4	10	45	44	+1	40	
7	Vålerenga	26	10	6	10	34	34	0	36	
8	Fredrikstad	26	9	9	8	37	40	−3	36	
9	Lyn	26	10	4	12	43	46	−3	34	
10	Strømsgodset	26	8	6	12	34	47	−13	30	
11	Aalesund	26	9	3	14	40	56	−16	30	
12	Odd Grenland (R)	26	8	3	15	33	43	−10	27	Qualification for the relegation play-offs
13	Start (R)	26	6	8	12	34	44	−10	26	Relegation to First Division
14	Sandefjord (R)	26	4	4	18	26	53	−27	16	Relegation to First Division

Source: fotball.no
Rules for classification: 1) points; 2) goal difference; 3) number of goals scored.
(C) Champions; (R) Relegated

==== 1. divisjon ====
Pos	Team	Pld	W	D	L	GF	GA	GD	Pts	Promotion or relegation
1	Molde (C, P)	30	22	3	5	62	28	+34	69	Promotion to Tippeligaen
2	Ham-Kam (P)	30	21	5	4	82	36	+46	68	Promotion to Tippeligaen
3	Bodø/Glimt (O, P)	30	17	4	9	66	39	+27	55	Qualification for the promotion play-offs (Note: The third-placed team in the 1. divisjon and the 12th-placed team in the Tippeligaen met in a playoff at the end of the season.)
4	Kongsvinger	30	16	5	9	56	42	+14	53	
5	Moss	30	15	8	7	46	37	+9	53	
6	Bryne	30	14	7	9	57	38	+19	49	
7	Sogndal	30	13	5	12	48	44	+4	44	
8	Haugesund	30	10	9	11	49	52	−3	39	
9	Notodden	30	11	3	16	49	54	−5	36	
10	Hønefoss	30	8	11	11	34	52	−18	35	
11	Raufoss (Note: Raufoss were relegated after failing to obtain a license due to financial irregularities. Sarpsborg Sparta, who were relegated initially, were given Raufoss spot in the following season.) (R)	30	10	5	15	37	61	−24	35	Relegation to Second Division
12	Løv-Ham	30	9	6	15	39	44	−5	33	
13	Sarpsborg Sparta	30	8	8	14	50	52	−2	32	
14	Tromsdalen (R)	30	7	8	15	37	56	−19	29	Relegation to Second Division
15	Skeid (R)	30	4	8	18	32	60	−28	20	Relegation to Second Division
16	Mandalskameratene (R)	30	4	7	19	43	92	−49	19	Relegation to Second Division

Source: nifs.no
Rules for classification: 1) points; 2) goal difference; 3) number of goals scored.
(C) Champions; (O) Play-off winners; (P) Promoted; (R) Relegated

==== 2. divisjon ====
===== Group 1 =====
Pos	Team	Pld	W	D	L	GF	GA	GD	Pts	Promotion or relegation
1	Nybergsund (P)	26	20	3	3	75	24	+51	63	Promotion to First Division
2	Tønsberg	26	15	8	3	72	31	+41	53	
3	Groruddalen	26	14	4	8	68	41	+27	46	
4	Kjelsås	26	10	6	10	61	57	+4	36	
5	Eidsvold Turn	26	9	9	8	38	40	−2	36	
6	Ull/Kisa	26	10	6	10	39	47	−8	36	
7	Pors Grenland	26	10	5	11	39	44	−5	35	
8	Fredrikstad 2	26	9	7	10	48	46	+2	34	
9	Korsvoll	26	9	6	11	51	52	−1	33	
10	Sarpsborg (R)	26	8	6	12	43	72	−29	30	Withdrew (Note: Sarpsborg pulled out of the 2. divisjon due to a merger with Sparta Sarpsborg to form a First Division team Sarpsborg Sparta FK.)
11	Odd Grenland 2 (R)	26	7	8	11	41	60	−19	29	Relegation to Third Division
12	Strømmen	26	8	4	14	50	52	−2	28	
13	FF Lillehammer (R)	26	6	7	13	44	67	−23	25	Relegation to Third Division
14	Gjøvik-Lyn (R)	26	4	7	15	31	67	−36	19	Relegation to Third Division

(P) Promoted; (R) Relegated

===== Group 2 =====
Pos	Team	Pld	W	D	L	GF	GA	GD	Pts	Promotion or relegation
1	Hødd (P)	26	18	3	5	77	30	+47	57	Promotion to First Division
2	Asker	26	15	7	4	72	33	+39	52	
3	Ranheim	26	14	7	5	58	28	+30	49	
4	Strindheim	26	15	4	7	69	40	+29	49	
5	Kristiansund	26	14	6	6	57	35	+22	48	
6	Bærum	26	11	5	10	55	42	+13	38	
7	Vålerenga 2	26	11	3	12	48	60	−12	36	
8	Byåsen	26	10	5	11	47	41	+6	35	
9	Stabæk 2	26	11	1	14	48	56	−8	34	
10	Levanger	26	8	6	12	44	61	−17	30	
11	Steinkjer	26	9	3	14	49	75	−26	30	
12	Lillestrøm 2 (Note: Lillestrøm 2 survived since Sarpsborg pulled out of group 1.)	26	8	1	17	39	75	−36	25	
13	Nardo (R)	26	5	5	16	32	66	−34	20	Relegation to Third Division
14	Averøykameratene (R)	26	3	4	19	24	77	−53	13	Relegation to Third Division

(P) Promoted; (R) Relegated

===== Group 3 =====
Pos	Team	Pld	W	D	L	GF	GA	GD	Pts	Promotion or relegation
1	Sandnes Ulf (P)	26	17	4	5	66	30	+36	55	Promotion to First Division
2	Stavanger	26	17	1	8	62	27	+35	52	
3	Manglerud Star	26	15	5	6	44	24	+20	50	
4	Vard Haugesund	26	12	6	8	49	48	+1	42	
5	Fyllingen	26	11	7	8	38	42	−4	40	
6	Start 2 (R)	27	11	6	10	44	40	+4	39	Relegation to Third Division
7	Os	26	11	5	10	49	48	+1	38	
8	Viking 2	26	11	3	12	52	45	+7	36	
9	Fana	25	9	8	8	41	46	−5	35	
10	Flekkerøy	26	9	7	10	56	42	+14	34	
11	Ålgård	26	7	4	15	29	49	−20	25	
12	Åsane	26	8	1	17	32	53	−21	25	
13	Askøy (R)	26	8	0	18	40	82	−42	24	Relegation to Third Division
14	Arendal (R)	26	5	4	17	29	55	−26	19	Relegation to Third Division

(P) Promoted; (R) Relegated

===== Group 4 =====
Pos	Team	Pld	W	D	L	GF	GA	GD	Pts	Promotion or relegation
1	Alta (P)	26	16	4	6	71	37	+34	52	Promotion to First Division
2	Mjøndalen	26	14	7	5	62	34	+28	49	
3	Drøbak/Frogn	26	15	3	8	68	36	+32	48	
4	Lørenskog	26	12	10	4	58	33	+25	46	
5	Follo	26	14	4	8	48	30	+18	46	
6	Tromsø 2	26	12	2	12	46	55	−9	38	
7	Åmot	26	12	2	12	50	61	−11	38	
8	Mo	26	11	4	11	38	43	−5	37	
9	Sprint-Jeløy	26	11	3	12	41	48	−7	36	
10	Rosenborg 2	26	9	3	14	54	55	−1	30	
11	Skarp	26	9	2	15	46	70	−24	29	
12	Harstad (R)	26	7	3	16	35	45	−10	24	Relegation to Third Division
13	Mjølner (R)	26	6	6	14	37	61	−24	24	Relegation to Third Division
14	Hammerfest (R)	26	7	1	18	23	69	−46	22	Relegation to Third Division

(P) Promoted; (R) Relegated

=== Norwegian Cup ===
==== Final ====
11 November 2007
13:15 CET (UTC+1)

Haugesund	0–2	Lillestrøm
	Report	Occean 57', 90'

Ullevaal Stadion, Oslo
Attendance: 24,361
Referee: Per Ivar Staberg (Harstad)

== Women's football ==
=== League season ===
==== Promotion and relegation ====
League	Promoted to league	Relegated from league
Toppserien	Asker; Kattem; Grand Bodø	Liungen
1. divisjon	Donn; Linderud-Grei; Skjetten; Tromsdalen	Bamble

==== Toppserien ====
Pos	Team	Pld	W	D	L	GF	GA	GD	Pts	Qualification or relegation
1	Røa (C)	22	17	2	3	63	24	+39	53	Qualification for the UEFA Women's Cup first qualifying round
2	Kolbotn	22	16	2	4	71	18	+53	50	
3	Asker	22	15	5	2	68	18	+50	50	
4	Arna-Bjørnar	22	12	4	6	47	34	+13	40	
5	Team Strømmen	22	10	6	6	37	29	+8	36	
6	Trondheims-Ørn	22	9	3	10	38	38	0	30	
7	Klepp	22	8	4	10	35	30	+5	28	
8	Amazon Grimstad	22	7	5	10	29	46	−17	26	
9	Fløya	22	7	4	11	36	52	−16	25	
10	Kattem	22	5	4	13	24	55	−31	19	
11	Sandviken (R)	22	2	3	17	16	76	−60	9	Relegation to First Division
12	Grand Bodø (R)	22	2	2	18	19	63	−44	8	Relegation to First Division

Source: NIFS
Rules for classification: 1) points; 2) goal difference; 3) number of goals scored.
(C) Champions; (R) Relegated

=== Norwegian Women's Cup ===
==== Final ====
- Asker 2–4 Kolbotn

== Men's UEFA competitions ==
=== Champions League ===
==== Qualifying rounds ====
===== Second qualifying round =====
Team 1	Agg.	Team 2	1st leg	2nd leg
Astana (Kazakhstan)	2–10	(Norway) Rosenborg	1–3	1–7

===== Third qualifying round =====
Team 1	Agg.	Team 2	1st leg	2nd leg
Tampere United (Finland)	0–5	(Norway) Rosenborg	0–3	0–2

==== Group stage ====
===== Group B =====
Pos	Team	Pld	W	D	L	GF	GA	GD	Pts	Qualification	CHE	SCH	ROS	VAL
1	(England) Chelsea	6	3	3	0	9	2	+7	12	Advance to knockout stage	—	2–0	1–1	0–0
2	(Germany) Schalke 04	6	2	2	2	5	4	+1	8	Advance to knockout stage	0–0	—	3–1	0–1
3	(Norway) Rosenborg	6	2	1	3	6	10	−4	7	Transfer to UEFA Cup	0–4	0–2	—	2–0
4	(Spain) Valencia	6	1	2	3	2	6	−4	5		1–2	0–0	0–2	—

Source: RSSSF

=== UEFA Cup ===
==== Qualifying rounds ====
===== First qualifying round =====
Team 1	Agg.	Team 2	1st leg	2nd leg
Carmarthen Town (Wales)	3–14	(Norway) Brann	0–8	3–6
Flora Tallinn (Estonia)	0–2	(Norway) Vålerenga	0–1	0–1
Lillestrøm (Norway)	2–2 (a)	(Luxembourg) Käerjéng 97	2–1	0–1

===== Second qualifying round =====
Team 1	Agg.	Team 2	1st leg	2nd leg
Ekranas (Lithuania)	1–7	(Norway) Vålerenga	1–1	0–6
Brann (Norway)	6–4	(Lithuania) Sūduva	2–1	4–3
Hammarby (Sweden)	3–2	(Norway) Fredrikstad	2–1	1–1

==== First round ====
Team 1	Agg.	Team 2	1st leg	2nd leg
Brann (Norway)	2–2 (a)	(Belgium) Club Brugge	0–1	2–1
Austria Wien	4–2	(Norway) Vålerenga	2–0	2–2

==== Group stage ====
===== Group D =====
Pos	Team	Pld	W	D	L	GF	GA	GD	Pts	Qualification	HSV	BAS	BRA	DZ	REN
1	(Germany) Hamburger SV	4	3	1	0	7	1	+6	10	Advance to knockout stage	—	1–1	—	—	3–0
2	(Switzerland) Basel	4	2	2	0	3	1	+2	8	Advance to knockout stage	—	—	1–0	—	1–0
3	(Norway) Brann	4	1	1	2	3	4	−1	4	Advance to knockout stage	0–1	—	—	2–1	—
4	(Croatia) Dinamo Zagreb	4	0	2	2	2	5	−3	2		0–2	0–0	—	—	—
5	(France) Rennes	4	0	2	2	2	6	−4	2		—	—	1–1	1–1	—

==== Final phase ====
===== Round of 32 =====
Team 1	Agg.	Team 2	1st leg	2nd leg
Brann (Norway)	1–8	(England) Everton	0–2	1–6
Rosenborg (Norway)	1–3	(Italy) Fiorentina	0–1	1–2

=== Intertoto Cup ===
No Norwegian teams participated this season.

== UEFA Women's Cup ==
=== Second qualifying round ===
==== Group B4 ====
Pos	Team	Pld	W	D	L	GF	GA	GD	Pts	Qualification	BRØ	LYO	KOL	SPR
1	(Denmark) Brøndby	3	2	1	0	3	1	+2	7	Advance to quarter-finals	—	0–0	–	2–1
2	(France) Lyon (H)	3	2	1	0	3	1	+2	7	Advance to quarter-finals	–	—	1–0	–
3	(Norway) Kolbotn	3	1	0	2	3	3	0	3		0–1	–	—	3–1
4	(Czech Republic) Sparta Prague	3	0	0	3	3	7	−4	0		–	1–2	–	—

Source: RSSSFGroup B4
(H) Hosts

Matches (Played in Lyon and Bron, France)

Kolbotn 3–1 Sparta Prague
Lyon 1–0 Kolbotn
Kolbotn 0–1 Brøndby

== National teams ==
=== Norway men's national football team ===
==== UEFA Euro 2008 qualifying ====
===== Group C =====
Pos	Team	Pld	W	D	L	GF	GA	GD	Pts	Qualification	(Greece)	(Turkey)	(Norway)	(Bosnia and Herzegovina)	(Moldova)	(Hungary)	(Malta)
1	Greece	12	10	1	1	25	10	+15	31	Qualify for final tournament	—	1–4	1–0	3–2	2–1	2–0	5–0
2	Turkey	12	7	3	2	25	11	+14	24	Qualify for final tournament	0–1	—	2–2	1–0	5–0	3–0	2–0
3	Norway	12	7	2	3	27	11	+16	23		2–2	1–2	—	1–2	2–0	4–0	4–0
4	Bosnia and Herzegovina	12	4	1	7	16	22	−6	13		0–4	3–2	0–2	—	0–1	1–3	1–0
5	Moldova	12	3	3	6	12	19	−7	12 (Note: Tied on head-to-head points (3). Head-to-head goal difference: Moldova +1, Hungary −1.)		0–1	1–1	0–1	2–2	—	3–0	1–1
6	Hungary	12	4	0	8	11	22	−11	12		1–2	0–1	1–4	1–0	2–0	—	2–0
7	Malta	12	1	2	9	10	31	−21	5		0–1	2–2	1–4	2–5	2–3	2–1	—

Source: UEFA
Rules for classification: Qualification tiebreakers

==== Fixtures and results ====
Date	Venue	Opponents	Score	Competition	Norway scorers
7 February	Kantrida Stadium, Rijeka (A)	Croatia	1–2; Report	Friendly	Petter Vaagan Moen
24 March	Ullevaal Stadion, Oslo (H)	Bosnia and Herzegovina	1–2; Report	Euro Qualifier	John Carew
28 March	Commerzbank-Arena, Frankfurt (N)	Turkey	2–2; Report	Euro Qualifier	Simen Brenne; Martin Andresen
2 June	Ullevaal Stadion, Oslo (H)	Malta	4–0; Report	Euro Qualifier	Kristofer Hæstad; Thorstein Helstad; Steffen Iversen; John Arne Riise
6 June	Ullevaal Stadion, Oslo (H)	Hungary	4–0; Report	Euro Qualifier	Steffen Iversen; Daniel Braaten; John Carew (2)
22 August	Ullevaal Stadion, Oslo (H)	Argentina	2–1; Report	Friendly	John Carew (2)
8 September	Zimbru Stadium, Chişinău (A)	Moldova	1–0; Report	Euro Qualifier	Steffen Iversen
12 September	Ullevaal Stadion, Oslo (H)	Greece	2–2; Report	Euro Qualifier	John Carew; John Arne Riise
17 October	Bilino Polje, Zenica (A)	Bosnia and Herzegovina	2–0; Report	Euro Qualifier	Erik Hagen; Bjørn Helge Riise
17 November	Ullevaal Stadion, Oslo (H)	Turkey	1–2; Report	Euro Qualifier	Erik Hagen
21 November	Ta' Qali Stadium, Ta' Qali (A)	Malta	4–1; Report	Euro Qualifier	Steffen Iversen (3); Morten Gamst Pedersen

Key

- H = Home match
- A = Away match
- N = Neutral site match
