= FC Metalist 1925 Kharkiv (women) in European football =

Ukrainian club in European football

FC Metalist 1925 Kharkiv in European football
- Club: Metalist 1925 Kharkiv
- Seasons played: 12
- First entry: 2007–08 UEFA Women's Cup
- Latest entry: 2026–27 UEFA Women's Europa Cup

Metalist 1925 Kharkiv is a Ukrainian professional football club based in Kharkiv. Established in 2006 as Zhytlobud-1 Kharkiv, the club was formed from players of WFC Arsenal Kharkiv. In 2024, Zhytlobud-1 was fully integrated into FC Metalist 1925 Kharkiv and renamed to Metalist 1925. In 2026, FC Metalist 1925 Kharkiv changed their name to FC Kharkiv.

== History ==
Metalist 1925 Kharkiv made their debut in European competitions on 9 August 2007 as Zhytlobud-1 in the 2007–08 UEFA Women's Cup qualifying round. They faced the Dinamo Tbilisi women's team and won 14:0. Vera Djatel scored 7 goals in that game.

During their 2021–22 season, they reached the UEFA Champions League.

== Names ==
- 2006 – 2024 Zhytlobud-1 Kharkiv
- 2024 – 2026 Metalist 1925 Kharkiv
- 2026 – present FC Kharkiv

== Overall record ==
Accurate as of 18 August 2026

Competition	Played	Won	Drew	Lost	GF	GA	GD	Win%
Women's Cup / Women's Champions League	42	22	2	18	113	81	+32	52.38
Women's Europa Cup	0	0	0	0	0	0	+0	—

Legend: GF = Goals For. GA = Goals Against. GD = Goal Difference.

== Results ==
Season	Competition	Round	Club	Home	Away	Aggregate
2007–08	UEFA Women's Cup	First qualifying round	(Russia) Rossiyanka		0–3	Second place
2007–08	UEFA Women's Cup	First qualifying round	(Serbia) Napredak Kruševac		4–2	Second place
2007–08	UEFA Women's Cup	First qualifying round	(Georgia (country)) Dinamo Tbilisi		14–0	Second place
2009–10	UEFA Women's Champions League	Round of 32	(Sweden) Umeå	0–5	0–6	0–11
2012–13	UEFA Women's Champions League	Qualifying round	(Albania) Ada		14–1	Second place
2012–13	UEFA Women's Champions League	Qualifying round	(Faroe Islands) KÍ Klaksvík		2–1	Second place
2012–13	UEFA Women's Champions League	Qualifying round	(Cyprus) Apollon Limassol		0–3	Second place
2013–14	UEFA Women's Champions League	Qualifying round	(Republic of Ireland) Raheny United		2–1	Second place
2013–14	UEFA Women's Champions League	Qualifying round	(Northern Ireland) Crusaders Strikers		5–0	Second place
2013–14	UEFA Women's Champions League	Qualifying round	(Hungary) MTK		0–1	Second place
2014–15	UEFA Women's Champions League	Qualifying round	(Slovakia) Union Nové Zámky		3–1	Second place
2014–15	UEFA Women's Champions League	Qualifying round	(Northern Ireland) Glentoran		5–0	Second place
2014–15	UEFA Women's Champions League	Qualifying round	(Scotland) Glasgow City		0–4	Second place
2015–16	UEFA Women's Champions League	Qualifying round	(Latvia) Rīgas FS		4–1	Second place
2015–16	UEFA Women's Champions League	Qualifying round	(Slovakia) Union Nové Zámky		5–0	Second place
2015–16	UEFA Women's Champions League	Qualifying round	(Finland) PK-35 Vantaa		1–2	Second place
2016–17	UEFA Women's Champions League	Qualifying round	(Latvia) Rīgas FS		2–0	Third place
2016–17	UEFA Women's Champions League	Qualifying round	(Israel) Ramat HaSharon		0–1	Third place
2016–17	UEFA Women's Champions League	Qualifying round	(Bosnia and Herzegovina) SFK 2000		2–2	Third place
2018–19	UEFA Women's Champions League	Qualifying round	(Malta) Birkirkara	8–0		First place
2018–19	UEFA Women's Champions League	Qualifying round	(Wales) Cardiff Met	5–2		First place
2018–19	UEFA Women's Champions League	Qualifying round	(Romania) Olimpia Cluj	3–1		First place
2018–19	UEFA Women's Champions League	Round of 32	(Sweden) Linköpings	1–6	0–4	0–10
2019–20	UEFA Women's Champions League	Qualifying round	(Croatia) Split	3–2		Second place
2019–20	UEFA Women's Champions League	Qualifying round	(Luxembourg) Bettembourg	6–0		Second place
2019–20	UEFA Women's Champions League	Qualifying round	(Belarus) Minsk	0–2		Second place
2021–22	UEFA Women's Champions League	Qualifying round 1	(Bulgaria) NSA Sofia		5–1	5–1
2021–22	UEFA Women's Champions League	Qualifying round 1	(Slovenia) Pomurje		4–1	4–1
2021–22	UEFA Women's Champions League	Qualifying round 2	(Cyprus) Apollon Limassol	3–1	2–1	5–2
2021–22	UEFA Women's Champions League	Group stage	(Spain) Real Madrid	0–1	0–3	Third place
2021–22	UEFA Women's Champions League	Group stage	(France) Paris Saint-Germain	0–6	0–5	Third place
2021–22	UEFA Women's Champions League	Group stage	(Iceland) Breiðablik	0–0	2–0	Third place
2025–26	UEFA Women's Champions League	Qualifying round 2	(Sweden) Hammarby		4–5	4–5
2025–26	UEFA Women's Champions League	Qualifying round 2	(Netherlands) PSV Eindhoven		0–2	0–2
2026–27	UEFA Women's Champions League	Qualifying round 2	(Turkey) Fenerbahçe S.K.		1–2	1–2
2026–27	UEFA Women's Champions League	Qualifying round 2	(Serbia) TSC Bačka Topola		3–2	3–2
–	UEFA Women's Europa Cup	Qualifying round 1	(Kosovo) Mitrovica			

== Games record ==
As of 18 August 2026

Against	Played	Won	Drawn	Lost	GF	GA	Teams
Albania	1	1	0	0	14	1	Ada Velipojë
Belarus	1	0	0	1	0	2	Minsk
BIH	1	0	1	0	2	2	SFK 2000
Bulgaria	1	1	0	0	5	1	NSA Sofia
Croatia	1	1	0	0	3	2	Split
Cyprus	3	2	0	1	5	5	Apollon Limassol
Faroe Islands	1	1	0	0	2	1	KÍ Klaksvík
Finland	1	0	0	1	1	2	PK-35 Vantaa
France	2	0	0	2	0	11	Paris Saint-Germain
Georgia	1	1	0	0	14	0	Dinamo Tbilisi
Hungary	1	0	0	1	0	1	MTK Hungária
Iceland	2	1	1	0	2	0	Breiðablik
Ireland	1	1	0	0	2	1	Raheny United
Israel	1	0	0	1	0	1	Ramat HaSharon
Kosovo	0	0	0	0	0	0	Mitrovica
Latvia	2	2	0	0	6	1	Rīgas FS
Luxembourg	1	1	0	0	6	0	Bettembourg
Malta	1	1	0	0	8	0	Birkirkara
Netherlands	1	0	0	1	0	2	PSV Eindhoven
Northern Ireland	2	2	0	0	10	0	Crusaders Strikers, Glentoran
Romania	1	1	0	0	3	1	Olimpia Cluj
Russia	1	0	0	1	0	3	Rossiyanka
Scotland	1	0	0	1	0	4	Glasgow City
Serbia	2	2	0	0	7	4	Napredak Kruševac, TSC Bačka Topola
Slovakia	2	2	0	0	8	1	Union Nové Zámky
Slovenia	1	1	0	0	4	1	Pomurje
Spain	2	0	0	2	0	4	Real Madrid
Sweden	5	0	0	5	5	26	Umeå, Linköpings, Hammarby Fotboll
Turkey	1	0	0	1	1	2	Fenerbahçe
Wales	1	1	0	0	5	2	Cardiff Met
