= 2007–08 UEFA Women's Cup knockout phase =

Tournament details
- Dates: 14 November 2007 – 24 May 2008
- Teams: 8

The 2007–08 UEFA Women's Cup knockout phase began on 14 November 2007 and concluded on 17 and 24 May 2008 with the two legged tie at the Gammliavallen in Umeå, Sweden and the Waldstadion in Frankfurt, Germany to decide the champions of the 2007–08 UEFA Women's Cup. A total of 8 teams competed in the knockout phase.

== Bracket ==
Quarter-finals
(France) Lyon	0	3	3
(England) Arsenal	0	2	2
(Belgium) Rapide Wezemaal	0	0	0
(Sweden) Umeå	4	6	10
(Russia) Rossiyanka	0	1	1
(Germany) Frankfurt	0	2	2
(Italy) Bardolino	0	1	1 (3)
(Denmark) Brøndby	1	0	1 (2)

Semi-finals
(France) Lyon	1	0	1
(Sweden) Umeå (a)	1	0	1
(Germany) Frankfurt	4	3	7
(Italy) Bardolino	2	0	2

Final
(Sweden) Umeå	1	2	3
(Germany) Frankfurt	1	3	4

== Quarter-finals ==
The first legs was played on 14 & 15 November 2007, and the second legs on 21 & 22 November 2007.

Team 1	Agg.	Team 2	1st leg	2nd leg
Lyon (France)	3–2	(England) Arsenal	0–0	3–2
Rapide Wezemaal (Belgium)	0–10	(Sweden) Umeå	0–4	0–6
Rossiyanka (Russia)	1–2	(Germany) Frankfurt	0–0	1–2
Bardolino (Italy)	1–1 (3–2 p)	(Denmark) Brøndby	0–1	1–0 (a.e.t.)

14 November 2007
19:00 (CET)

Lyon (France)	0–0	(England) Arsenal
	Report

Stade de Gerland, Lyon
Attendance: 5,000
Referee: Bibiana Steinhaus (Germany)
21 November 2007
20:30 (CET)

Arsenal (England)	2–3	(France) Lyon
Smith 24'; Yankey 33'	Report	Kátia 16'; Abily 38'; Thomis 85'

Meadow Park, Borehamwood
Referee: Jenny Palmqvist (Sweden)

Lyon won 3–2 on aggregate

14 November 2007
20:00 (CET)

Rapide Wezemaal (Belgium)	0–4	(Sweden) Umeå
	Report	Marta 9', 90'; Westberg 35'; Bachmann 75'

Stayen, Sint-Truiden
Attendance: 2,600
Referee: Natalia Avdonchenko (Russia)
22 November 2007
19:00 (CET)

Umeå (Sweden)	6–0	(Belgium) Rapide Wezemaal
Van Malenstein 6' (o.g.); Edlund 18', 28'; Marta 44', 67'; Ljungberg 60'	Report

Gammliavallen, Umeå
Attendance: 423
Referee: Gyöngyi Gaál (Hungary)

Umeå won 10–0 on aggregate

15 November 2007
16:00 (CET)

Rossiyanka (Russia)	0–0	(Germany) Frankfurt
	Report

Rodina, Moscow
Attendance: 800
Referee: Cristina Dorcioman (Romania)
21 November 2007
13:30 (CET)

Frankfurt (Germany)	2–1	(Russia) Rossiyanka
Wimbersky 23'; Prinz 44'	Report	Morozova 90+1'

Stadion am Brentanobad, Frankfurt
Attendance: 2,165
Referee: Wendy Toms (England)

Frankfurt won 2–1 on aggregate

14 November 2007
20:00 (CET)

Bardolino (Italy)	0–1	(Denmark) Brøndby
	Report	Christensen 13'

Marc'Antonio Bentegodi, Verona
Attendance: 4,653
Referee: Christine Beck (Germany)
21 November 2007
18:00 (CET)

Brøndby (Denmark)	0–1 (a.e.t.)	(Italy) Bardolino
	Report	Tuttino 37'
Penalties
Jensen (penalty missed); Nielsen (penalty scored); Sørensen (penalty missed); Christensen (penalty scored); Werming (penalty missed)	2–3	(penalty scored) Boni]; (penalty scored) Panico; (penalty scored) Gabbiadini; (penalty missed) Motta; (penalty missed) Tuttino

Brøndby Stadium, Brøndby
Attendance: 251
Referee: Nicole Petignat (Switzerland)

1–1 on aggregate. Bardolino won 3–2 on penalties.

== Semi-finals ==
The first legs are scheduled to be played on 29 March and the second leg on 6 April 2008.

Team 1	Agg.	Team 2	1st leg	2nd leg
Lyon (France)	1–1 (a)	(Sweden) Umeå	1–1	0–0
Frankfurt (Germany)	7–2	(Italy) Bardolino	4–2	3–0

30 March 2008
14:30 (CET)

Lyon (France)	1–1	(Sweden) Umeå
Necib 72'	Report	Edlund 57'

Stade de Gerland, Lyon
Attendance: 12,375
Referee: Tanja Schett (Austria)
6 April 2008
13:30 (CET)

Umeå (Sweden)	0–0	(France) Lyon
	Report

Gammliavallen, Umeå
Attendance: 3,372
Referee: Alexandra Ihringova (England)

1–1 on aggregate. Umeå won on away goals.

29 March 2008
15:00 (CET)

Frankfurt (Germany)	4–2	(Italy) Bardolino
Pohlers 5', 81'; Prinz 19', 79'	Report	Motta 47'; Gabbiadini 83'

Stadion am Brentanobad, Frankfurt
Attendance: 5,190
Referee: Claudine Brohet (Belgium)
5 April 2008
20:30 (CET)

Bardolino (Italy)	0–3	(Germany) Frankfurt
	Report	Thomas 68'; Garefrekes 80'; Pohlers 81'

Marc'Antonio Bentegodi, Verona
Attendance: 12,500
Referee: Maaren Olander (Estonia)

Frankfurt won 7–2 on aggregate

== Final ==
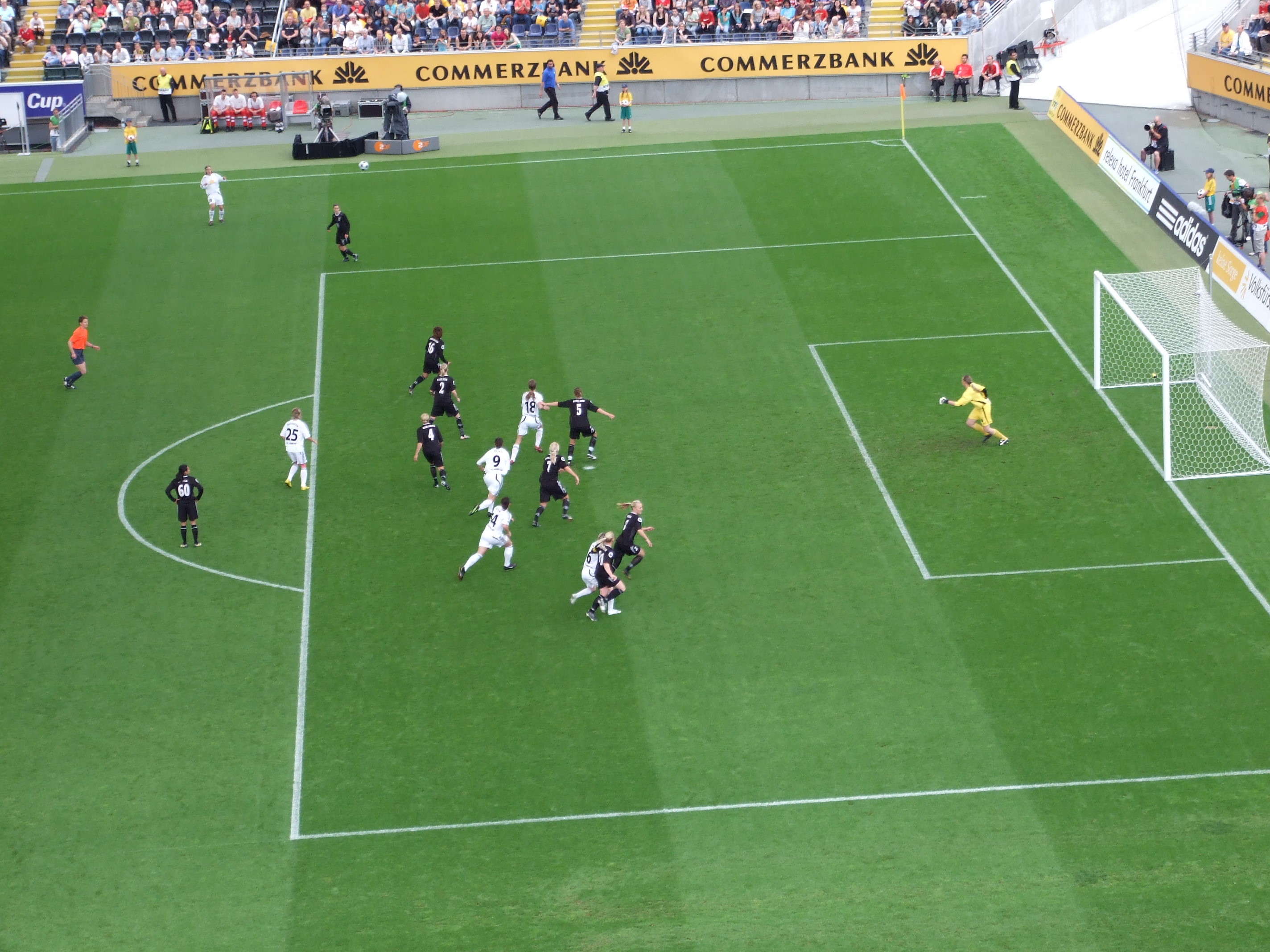
attack against Umeå

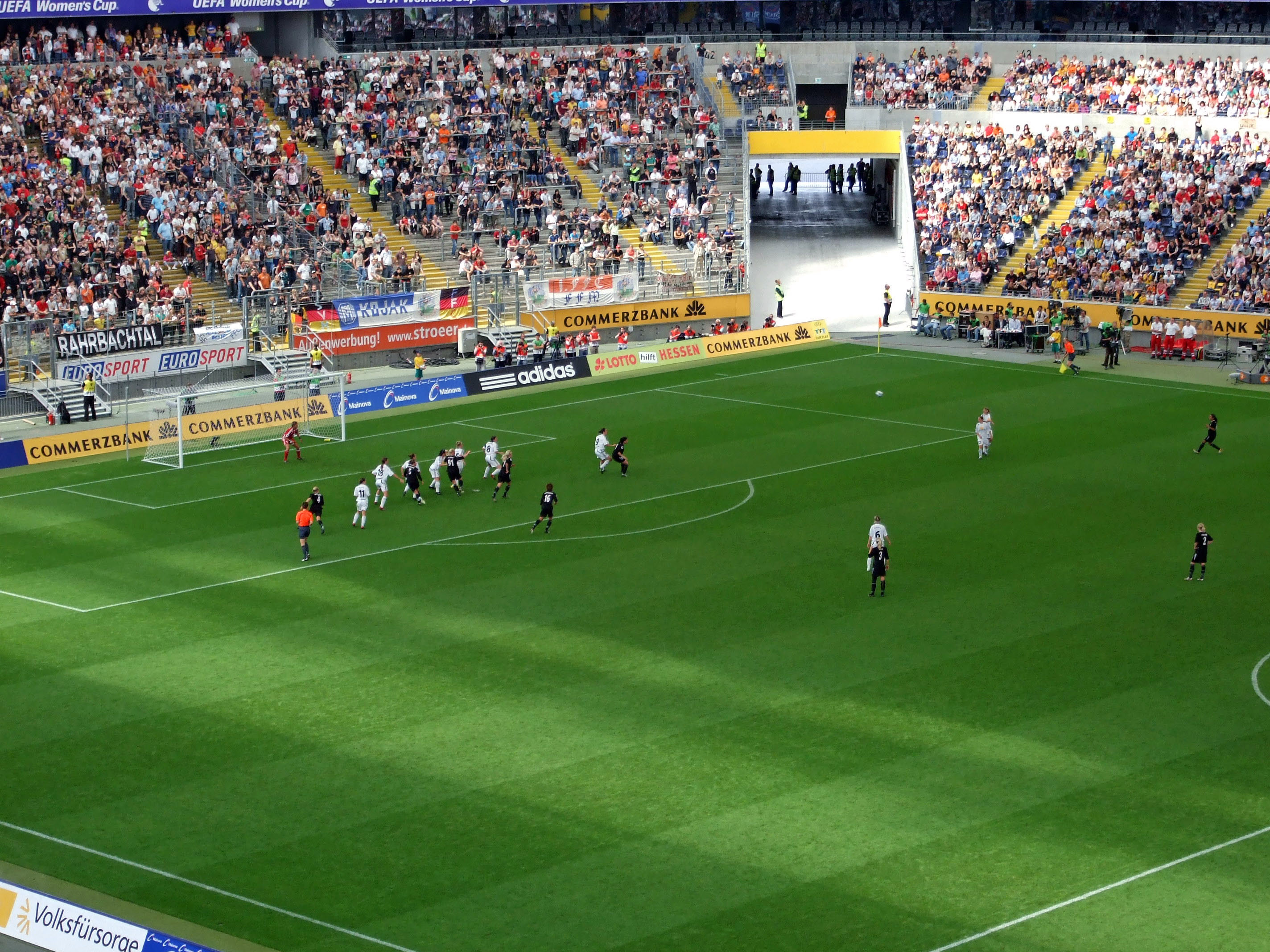
attack against 1. FFC

The first leg was played o 17 May 2008, and the second leg on 24 May 2008.

Team 1	Agg.	Team 2	1st leg	2nd leg
Umeå (Sweden)	3–4	(Germany) Frankfurt	1–1	2–3

17 May 2008
13:00 UTC+2

Umeå (Sweden)	1–1	(Germany) Frankfurt
Marta 1'	Report	Pohlers 5'

Gammliavallen, Umeå
Attendance: 4,128
Referee: Gyöngyi Gaál (Hungary)
24 May 2008
14:15 UTC+2

Frankfurt (Germany)	3–2	(Sweden) Umeå
Pohlers 7', 55'; Wimbersky 71'	Report	Dahlqvist 68' (pen.); Östberg 83'

Commerzbank-Arena, Frankfurt
Attendance: 27,640
Referee: Alexandra Ihringova (England)

Frankfurt won 4–3 on aggregate

UEFA Women's Cup
2007–08 Winner
(Germany)
Frankfurt
Third title
