= Marta Otrębska =

Polish footballer (born 1968)

Personal information
- Full name: Marta Otrębska
- Date of birth: 7 October 1968 (age 58)
- Place of birth: Poland
- Position: Striker

Senior career*
Years	Team	Apps	(Gls)
1983–1992	Czarni Sosnowiec		
1992–1995	Kristineberg		
1995–1998	Czarni Sosnowiec		
1998–1999	Turbine Potsdam	4	(1)
1999–2000	Medyk Konin		
2000–2006	AZS Wrocław	90	(120)
2006–2008	Gol Częstochowa		(23)
2008	→ IFK Kalmar (loan)		
2009–2013	Rodsle BK		

International career
1988–2007	Poland	101	(48)
- * Club domestic league appearances and goals

Marta Otrębska (born 7 October 1968) is a Polish former footballer who played as a striker.

== Career ==
Throughout her career she played for Czarni Sosnowiec, Medyk Konin, AZS Wrocław and Gol Częstochowa in Poland's Ekstraliga and, briefly, Turbine Potsdam in the German Bundesliga.

She was a member of the Polish national team for nearly two decades, taking part in 101 games.

== Career statistics ==
=== International ===
Appearances and goals by national team and year
National team	Year	Apps	Goals
Poland	1988	2	0
Poland	1989	4	0
Poland	1990	3	1
Poland	1991	8	1
Poland	1992	5	1
Poland	1993	1	0
Poland	1995	6	8
Poland	1996	9	3
Poland	1997	4	3
Poland	1998	8	9
Poland	1999	6	4
Poland	2000	4	6
Poland	2001	9	5
Poland	2002	6	4
Poland	2003	4	0
Poland	2004	4	1
Poland	2005	8	2
Poland	2006	3	0
Poland	2007	7	0
Total		101	48

== Honours ==
Czarni Sosnowiec

- Ekstraliga: 1983–84, 1984–85, 1985–86, 1986–87, 1988–89, 1990–91, 1996–97, 1997–98
- Polish Cup: 1984–85, 1986–87, 1988–89, 1995–96, 1996–97, 1997–98

AWF Wrocław

- Ekstraliga: 2000–01, 2001–02, 2002–03, 2003–04, 2004–05, 2005–06
- Polish Cup: 2002–03, 2003–04

Individual

- Ekstraliga top scorer: 2003–04
