= Marta Stobba =

Polish footballer

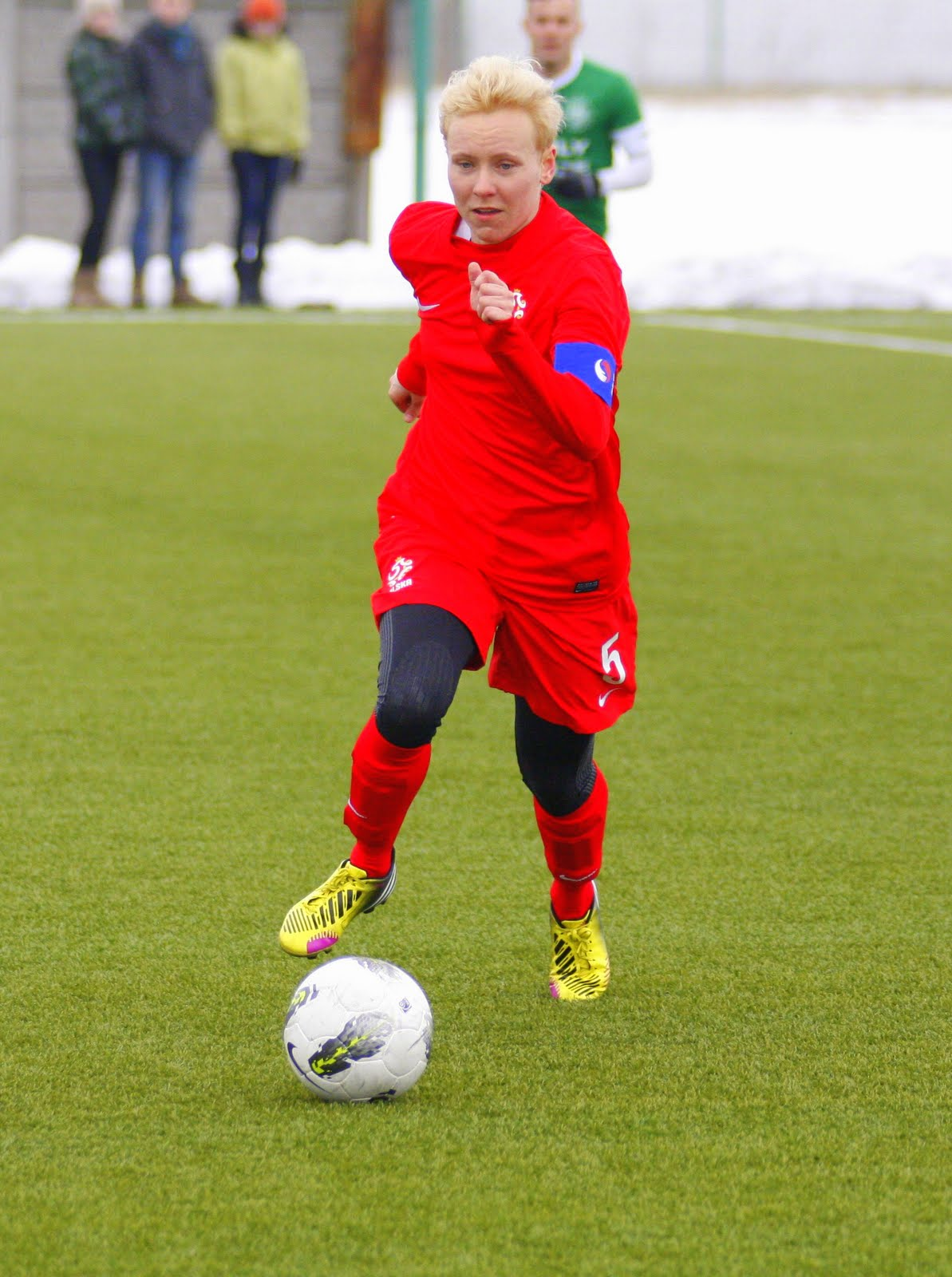
- Stobba playing for Poland in 2013

Personal information
- Full name: Marta Stobba
- Date of birth: 15 May 1986 (age 40)
- Place of birth: Poland
- Position: Midfielder

Senior career*
Years	Team	Apps	(Gls)
2001–2006	Czarni Sosnowiec		
2006–2008	Gol Częstochowa		(12)
2008–2011	Unia Racibórz		(8)
2011–2018	Cloppenburg	114	(16)

International career
2003–2014	Poland	59	(6)
- * Club domestic league appearances and goals

Marta Stobba (born 15 May 1986) is a Polish former footballer who played as a midfielder. She previously played for Czarni Sosnowiec, Gol Częstochowa and Unia Racibórz in the Polish Ekstraliga and for German club BV Cloppenburg.

She was a member of the Poland national team.

== Career statistics ==
=== International ===
Appearances and goals by national team and year
National team	Year	Apps	Goals
Poland	2003	1	0
Poland	2004	1	0
Poland	2005	6	0
Poland	2006	4	0
Poland	2007	8	2
Poland	2008	9	2
Poland	2009	2	1
Poland	2010	5	0
Poland	2011	7	1
Poland	2012	7	0
Poland	2013	6	0
Poland	2014	2	0
Total		59	6

== Honours ==
Czarni Sosnowiec

- Polish Cup: 2001–02

Unia Racibórz

- Ekstraliga: 2008–09, 2009–10, 2010–11
- Polish Cup: 2009–10, 2010–11
