= Gudny =

- Gender: Female

Origin
- Origin: Nordic
- Meaning: she who the gods make young

Gudny or Guðný is a Nordic female given name composed of the words for "god" and "new". Gudny is popular in the Nordic countries and was the 18th most popular female name in Iceland in 2004 . The name may refer to

- Gudný Jenny Ásmundsdóttir (born 1982), Icelandic handball player
- Guðný Halldórsdóttir (born 1954), Icelandic film director
- Guðný Björk Óðinsdóttir (born 1988), Icelandic football player

== See also ==
- Icelandic name
