= Olga Manzhuk =

Belarusian footballer

Personal information
- Date of birth: 1 February 1983 (age 43)
- Place of birth: Malaryta, Soviet Union (now Belarus)
- Height: 1.75 m (5 ft 9 in)
- Position: Midfielder

Team information
- Current team: Bobruichanka

Senior career*
Years	Team	Apps	(Gls)
2010-2019	Bobruichanka	141	(44)

International career^{‡}
	Belarus U18	2	(0)
	Belarus U19	3	(2)
2009–2013	Belarus	9	(0)
- * Club domestic league appearances and goals as of 3 November 2019 ‡ National team caps and goals as of 26 October 2013

Olga Manzhuk (born 1 February 1983) is a Belarusian footballer who plays as a midfielder for Belarusian Premier League club Bobruichanka Bobruisk. She has been a member of the Belarus women's national team.
