= Jenia Strezova =

Bulgarian footballer (born 1986)

Personal information
- Date of birth: 7 January 1986 (age 40)
- Position: Defender

Senior career*
Years	Team	Apps	(Gls)
- NSA Sofia

International career^{‡}
2001–200?	Bulgaria U19	9	(0)
2009–2012	Bulgaria	6	(0)
- * Club domestic league appearances and goals ‡ National team caps and goals as of 21 June 2012

Jenia Strezova (Bulgarian: Женя Стрезова; born 7 January 1986) is a Bulgarian footballer who plays as a defender. She has been a member of the Bulgaria women's national team.
