= Stanislava Tsekova =

Bulgarian footballer

Personal information
- Full name: Stanislava Tsekova
- Date of birth: 30 August 1982 (age 44)
- Place of birth: Sofia, Bulgaria
- Position: Midfielder

Senior career*
Years	Team	Apps	(Gls)
–	NSA Sofia		

International career
–	Bulgaria		
- * Club domestic league appearances and goals

Stanislava Tsekova (Bulgarian: Станислава Цекова) is a Bulgarian football midfielder, currently playing in the Bulgarian Championship for NSA Sofia, with whom she has also played the UEFA Women's Champions League. She is a member of the Bulgaria women's national football team.
