= Guðný Björk Óðinsdóttir =

Icelandic footballer

Guðný B. Óðinsdóttir
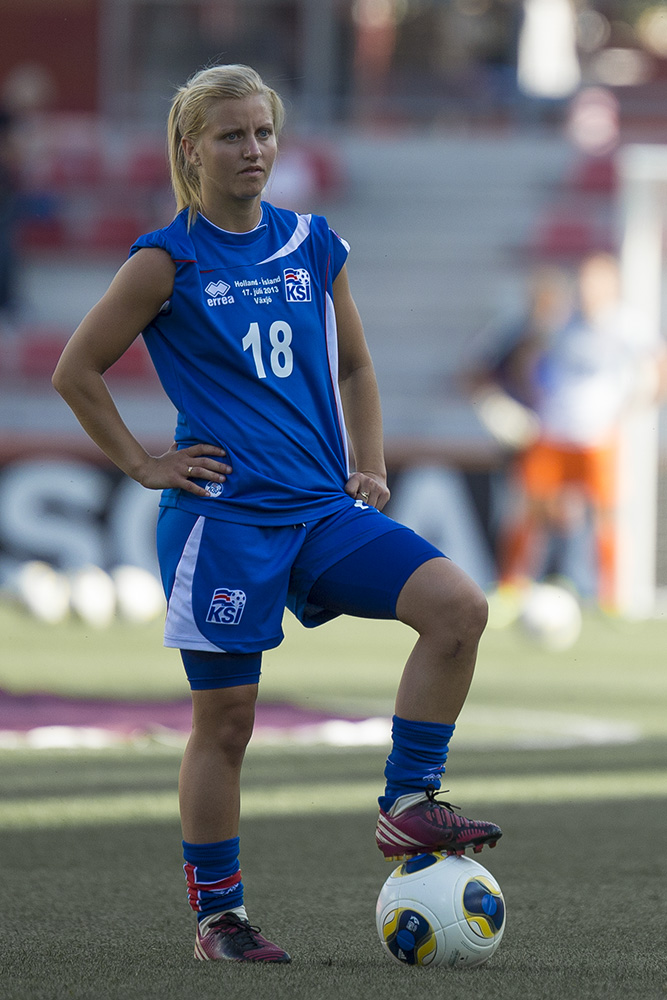
- Guðný with Iceland in 2013

Personal information
- Full name: Guðný Björk Óðinsdóttir
- Date of birth: 27 September 1988 (age 38)
- Place of birth: Mosfellsbær, Iceland
- Position: Midfielder

Youth career
- –2005: Afturelding

Senior career*
Years	Team	Apps	(Gls)
2005–2008	Valur	37	(11)
2009–2015	Kristianstads DFF	87	(5)
2010	→ Valur (loan)	2	(0)

International career^{‡}
2005	Iceland U-17	4	(0)
2005–2007	Iceland U-19	10	(1)
2006	Iceland U-21	4	(0)
2006–2015	Iceland	40	(0)
- * Club domestic league appearances and goals as of 18:03, 16 May 2015 (UTC) ‡ National team caps and goals as of 18:03, 16 May 2015 (UTC)

Guðný Björk Óðinsdóttir (born 27 September 1988) is an Icelandic former footballer who played as a midfielder for Kristianstads DFF of the Swedish Damallsvenskan and the Iceland women's national football team. She represented her country in the 2009 and 2013 editions of the UEFA Women's Championship.

Guðný made her senior international debut for Iceland in a 3–0 win over Portugal at the Laugardalsvöllur Arena in June 2006.

At UEFA Women's Euro 2009, Guðný was included in the squad but did not play in any of the matches as Iceland were eliminated in the first round.

At the 2013 European Championships in Sweden, Guðný suffered the fourth anterior cruciate ligament injury of her career at the age of 24. While preparing for another surgery she insisted that she had no intention of retiring.

Guðný made another comeback, but injuries eventually forced her into retirement at the age of 26 in May 2015.

== Achievements ==
- Icelandic champion 2 times (2006 and 2007). In addition played 2 of 18 games as Valur won in 2010.
- Icelandic cup winner 2 times (2006 and 2010).

== Honours ==
- Sport Person of the Year in Mosfellsbær in 2006
