= Maaren Olander-Doyle =

Estonian footballer

Personal information
- Date of birth: 10 October 1975 (age 51)
- Place of birth: Tallinn, then part of Estonian SSR, Soviet Union
- Position: Goalkeeper

International career^{‡}
Years	Team	Apps	(Gls)
1994–1998	Estonia	18	(0)
- ‡ National team caps and goals as of 23:24, 23 February 2021 (UTC)

Maaren Olander-Doyle (born 10 October 1975) is an Estonian former footballer and referee who played as a goalkeeper for the Estonia women's national team.

== Career ==
Olander-Doyle played in the first ever official match for Estonia, against Lithuania. Following her retirement from playing, she coached the Estonia national team and was head coach for the under-19 team at one point. She also became a football referee, gaining elite status in 2008.

== Personal life ==
Aside from her career in football, she has also played tennis, indoor hockey and has practised gymnastics. Since 2013, she has lived in Dubai.
