= 2007–08 UEFA Women's Cup =

Tournament details
- Dates: 8 September 2007 – 24 May 2008
- Teams: 45

Final positions
- Champions: (Germany) 1. FFC Frankfurt (3rd title)
- Runners-up: (Sweden) Umeå

Tournament statistics
- Top scorer(s): (Ukraine) Vira Dyatel (Italy) Patrizia Panico (Iceland) Margrét Lára Viðarsdóttir; 9 goals each

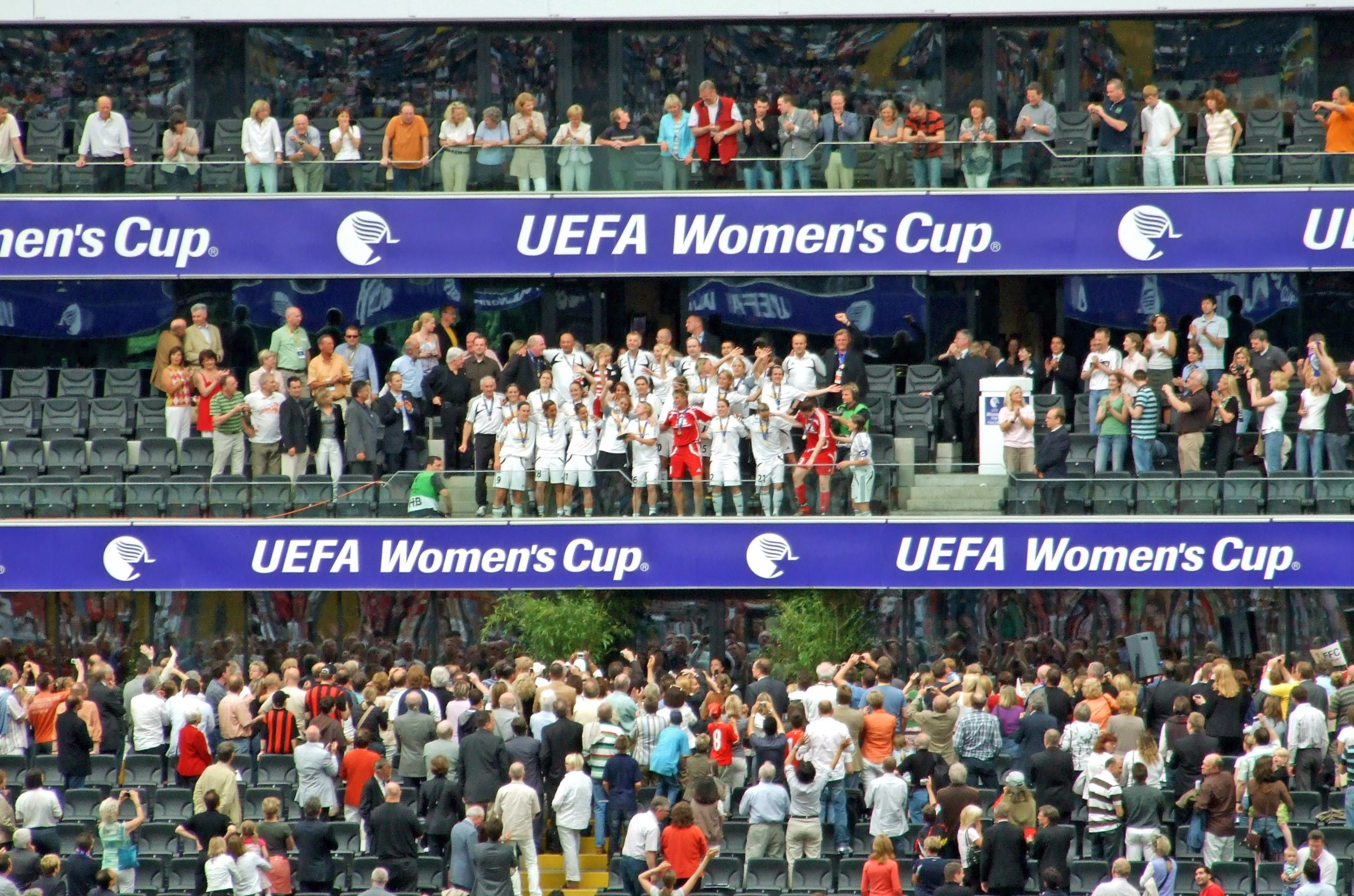
Champions receive their trophy

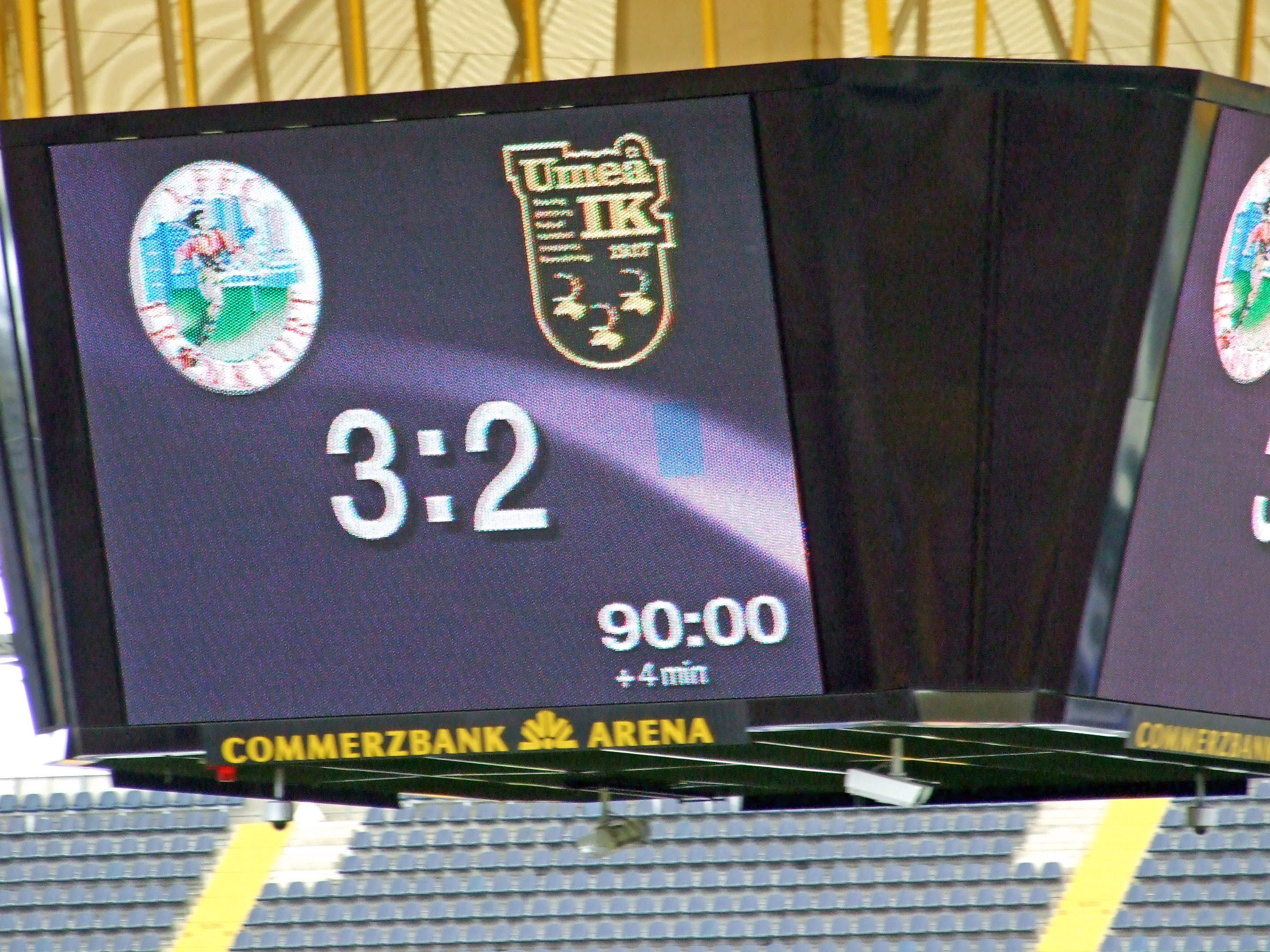
Final score

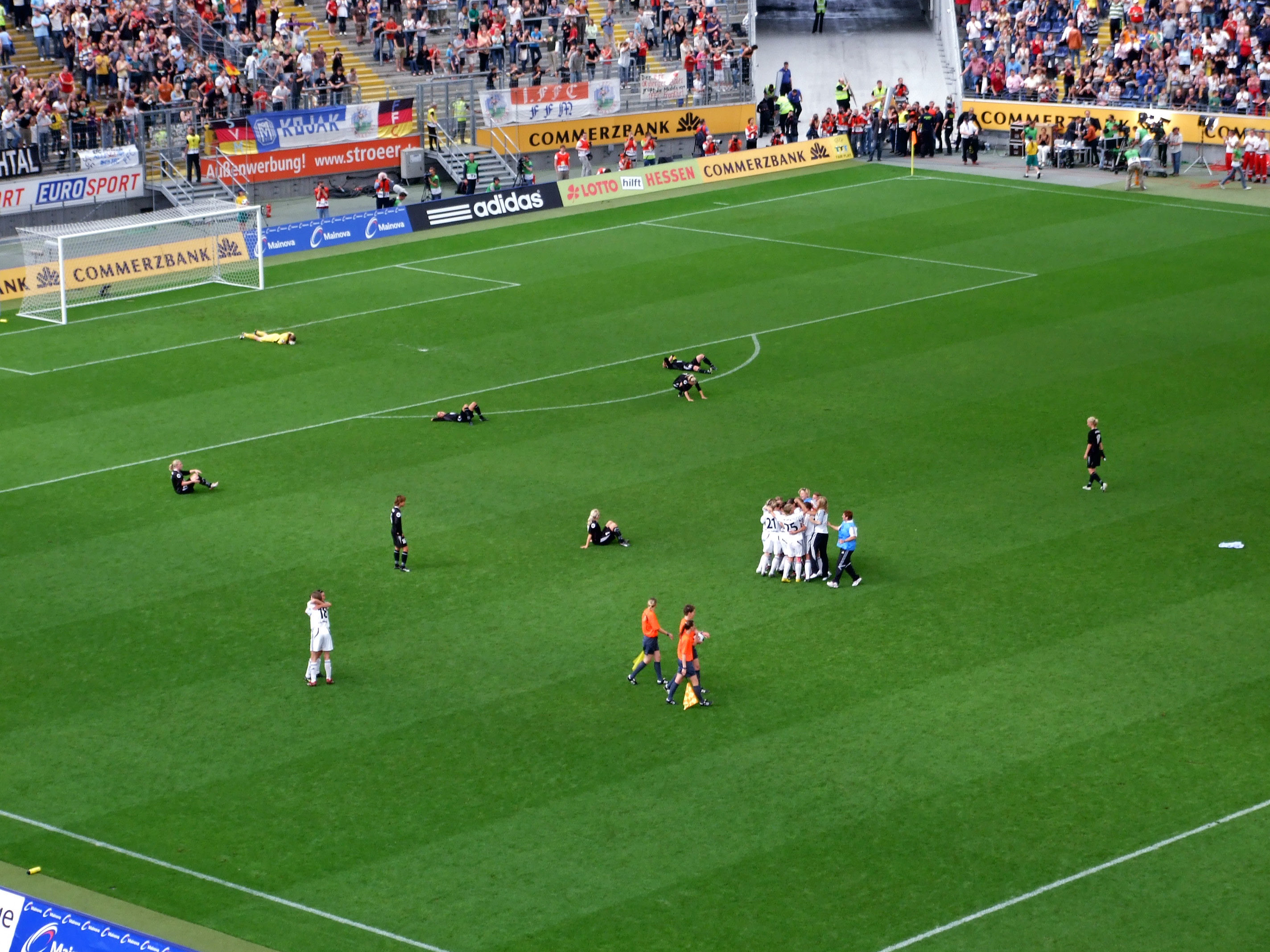
Post match celebrations

The UEFA Women's Cup 2007–08 was the seventh edition of the UEFA Women's Cup football club tournament (since rebranded as the UEFA Women's Champions League). 45 teams from 44 football associations took part this season. The tournament ended with Frankfurt of Germany emerging out as the winners in the final after a 4–3 aggregate win over Umeå of Sweden.

== Teams ==
Second qualifying round
| (England) Arsenal (TH, CH) | (Sweden) Umeå (CH) | (Germany) Frankfurt (CH) | (Denmark) Brøndby (CH) |
| (Norway) Kolbotn (CH) | | | |
First qualifying round
| (England) Everton (RU) | (Spain) Athletic Club Neskak (CH) | (Czech Republic) Sparta Prague (CH) | (Iceland) Valur (CH) |
| (Belgium) Rapide Wezemaal (CH) | (Russia) Rossiyanka (CH) | (Austria) Neulengbach (CH) | (France) Lyon (CH) |
| (Kazakhstan) Alma (CH) | (Belarus) Universitet Vitebsk (CH) | (Switzerland) Zuchwil (CH) | (Italy) Bardolino (CH) |
| (Israel) Maccabi Holon (CH) | (Netherlands) ADO Den Haag (CH) | (Bosnia and Herzegovina) SFK 2000 (CH) | (Hungary) Femina (CH) |
| (Poland) Gol Częstochowa (RU) | (Portugal) 1° Dezembro (CH) | (Bulgaria) NSA Sofia (CH) | (Ukraine) Zhytlobud-1 Kharkiv (CH) |
| (Scotland) Hibernian (CH) | (Wales) Cardiff City (CW) | (Greece) PAOK (CH) | (Lithuania) Gintra Universitetas (CH) |
| (Slovenia) ŽNK Krka (CH) | (Romania) CFF Clujana (CH) | (Finland) Honka (CH) | (Slovakia) Slovan Duslo Sala (CH) |
| (Serbia) Napredak Kruševac (CH) | (Moldova) Narta Chişinău (CH) | (Faroe Islands) KÍ Klaksvík (CH) | (North Macedonia) Skiponjat (CH) |
| (Azerbaijan) Ruslan-93 (CH) | (Republic of Ireland) Mayo Ladies League (CW) | (Croatia) Osijek (CH) | (Estonia) Pärnu JK (CH) |
| (Northern Ireland) Glentoran (CH) | (Malta) Birkirkara (CH) | (Cyprus) AEK Kokkinochorion (CH) | (Georgia (country)) Dinamo Tbilisi (CH) |

== Qualifying round ==
=== First qualifying round ===
==== Group A1 ====
| Pos | Team | Pld | W | D | L | GF | GA | GD | Pts | Qualification | EVE | ZUC | GUN | GLE |
|---|---|---|---|---|---|---|---|---|---|---|---|---|---|---|
| 1 | (England) Everton | 3 | 3 | 0 | 0 | 20 | 0 | +20 | 9 | Advance to second qualifying round | — | – | 4–0 | 11–0 |
| 2 | (Switzerland) Zuchwil | 3 | 2 | 0 | 1 | 11 | 6 | +5 | 6 | | 0–5 | — | – | 5–1 |
| 3 | (Lithuania) Gintra-Universitetas (H) | 3 | 1 | 0 | 2 | 2 | 11 | −9 | 3 | | – | 0–6 | — | – |
| 4 | (Northern Ireland) Glentoran | 3 | 0 | 0 | 3 | 2 | 18 | −16 | 0 | | – | – | 1–2 | — |

Source: RSSSFGroup A1
(H) Hosts

==== Group A2 ====
| Pos | Team | Pld | W | D | L | GF | GA | GD | Pts | Qualification | VAL | HON | ADH | KIK |
|---|---|---|---|---|---|---|---|---|---|---|---|---|---|---|
| 1 | (Iceland) Valur | 3 | 3 | 0 | 0 | 13 | 2 | +11 | 9 | Advance to second qualifying round | — | 2–1 | – | 6–0 |
| 2 | (Finland) FC Honka | 3 | 2 | 0 | 1 | 6 | 3 | +3 | 6 | | – | — | 1–0 | – |
| 3 | (Netherlands) ADO Den Haag | 3 | 0 | 1 | 2 | 2 | 7 | −5 | 1 | | 1–5 | – | — | 1–1 |
| 4 | (Faroe Islands) KÍ Klaksvík (H) | 3 | 0 | 1 | 2 | 2 | 11 | −9 | 1 | | – | 1–4 | – | — |

Source: RSSSFGroup A2
(H) Hosts

==== Group A3 ====
| Pos | Team | Pld | W | D | L | GF | GA | GD | Pts | Qualification | NEU | HIB | GCZ | MAY |
|---|---|---|---|---|---|---|---|---|---|---|---|---|---|---|
| 1 | (Austria) Neulengbach (H) | 3 | 3 | 0 | 0 | 15 | 4 | +11 | 9 | Advance to second qualifying round | — | 4–3 | – | 3–0 |
| 2 | (Scotland) Hibernian | 3 | 2 | 0 | 1 | 15 | 5 | +10 | 6 | | – | — | 4–1 | – |
| 3 | (Poland) Gol Częstochowa | 3 | 1 | 0 | 2 | 6 | 13 | −7 | 3 | | 1–8 | – | — | 4–1 |
| 4 | (Republic of Ireland) Mayo Ladies League | 3 | 0 | 0 | 3 | 1 | 15 | −14 | 0 | | – | 0–8 | – | — |

Source: RSSSFGroup A3
(H) Hosts

==== Group A4 ====
| Pos | Team | Pld | W | D | L | GF | GA | GD | Pts | Qualification | WEZ | DEZ | OSI | CAR |
|---|---|---|---|---|---|---|---|---|---|---|---|---|---|---|
| 1 | (Belgium) Rapide Wezemaal | 3 | 3 | 0 | 0 | 5 | 0 | +5 | 9 | Advance to second qualifying round | — | – | 2–0 | 2–0 |
| 2 | (Portugal) 1.º de Dezembro | 3 | 2 | 0 | 1 | 9 | 1 | +8 | 6 | | 0–1 | — | 7–0 | – |
| 3 | (Croatia) Osijek (H) | 3 | 1 | 0 | 2 | 2 | 10 | −8 | 3 | | – | – | — | 2–1 |
| 4 | (Wales) Cardiff City | 3 | 0 | 0 | 3 | 1 | 6 | −5 | 0 | | – | 0–2 | – | — |

Source: RSSSFGroup A4
(H) Hosts

==== Group A5 ====
| Pos | Team | Pld | W | D | L | GF | GA | GD | Pts | Qualification | BAR | NES | KRK | BIR |
|---|---|---|---|---|---|---|---|---|---|---|---|---|---|---|
| 1 | (Italy) Bardolino | 3 | 3 | 0 | 0 | 22 | 0 | +22 | 9 | Advance to second qualifying round | — | 1–0 | – | 16–0 |
| 2 | (Spain) Athletic Club Neskak | 3 | 2 | 0 | 1 | 20 | 1 | +19 | 6 | | – | — | 4–0 | 16–0 |
| 3 | (Slovenia) KRKA Novo Mesto (H) | 3 | 1 | 0 | 2 | 5 | 10 | −5 | 3 | | 0–5 | – | — | – |
| 4 | (Malta) Birkirkara | 3 | 0 | 0 | 3 | 1 | 37 | −36 | 0 | | – | – | 1–5 | — |

Source: RSSSFGroup A5
(H) Hosts

==== Group A6 ====
| Pos | Team | Pld | W | D | L | GF | GA | GD | Pts | Qualification | LYO | SFK | SKI | SDŠ |
|---|---|---|---|---|---|---|---|---|---|---|---|---|---|---|
| 1 | (France) Lyon | 3 | 3 | 0 | 0 | 29 | 0 | +29 | 9 | Advance to second qualifying round | — | – | 10–0 | 12–0 |
| 2 | (Bosnia and Herzegovina) SFK Sarajevo | 3 | 2 | 0 | 1 | 4 | 8 | −4 | 6 | | 0–7 | — | – | – |
| 3 | (North Macedonia) Skiponjat (H) | 3 | 1 | 0 | 2 | 4 | 13 | −9 | 3 | | – | 2–1 | — | 3–1 |
| 4 | (Slovakia) Slovan Šaľa | 3 | 0 | 0 | 3 | 1 | 17 | −16 | 0 | | – | 0–2 | – | — |

Source: RSSSFGroup A6
(H) Hosts

==== Group A7 ====
| Pos | Team | Pld | W | D | L | GF | GA | GD | Pts | Qualification | ROS | KHA | NKR | DTB |
|---|---|---|---|---|---|---|---|---|---|---|---|---|---|---|
| 1 | (Russia) Rossiyanka (H) | 3 | 3 | 0 | 0 | 28 | 0 | +28 | 9 | Advance to second qualifying round | — | – | 7–0 | 18–0 |
| 2 | (Ukraine) Zhytlobud-1 Kharkiv | 3 | 2 | 0 | 1 | 18 | 5 | +13 | 6 | | 0–3 | — | 2–4 | 14–0 |
| 3 | (Serbia) Napredak Kruševac | 3 | 1 | 0 | 2 | 8 | 13 | −5 | 3 | | – | – | — | – |
| 4 | (Georgia (country)) Dinamo Tbilisi | 3 | 0 | 0 | 3 | 2 | 38 | −36 | 0 | | – | – | 2–6 | — |

Source: RSSSFGroup A7
(H) Hosts

==== Group A8 ====
| Pos | Team | Pld | W | D | L | GF | GA | GD | Pts | Qualification | UVI | NSA | PAOK | PAR |
|---|---|---|---|---|---|---|---|---|---|---|---|---|---|---|
| 1 | (Belarus) Universitet Vitebsk | 3 | 3 | 0 | 0 | 12 | 0 | +12 | 9 | Advance to second qualifying round | — | – | 4–0 | 6–0 |
| 2 | (Bulgaria) NSA Sofia | 3 | 1 | 1 | 1 | 5 | 5 | 0 | 4 | | 0–2 | — | – | 3–1 |
| 3 | (Greece) PAOK (H) | 3 | 1 | 1 | 1 | 5 | 8 | −3 | 4 | | – | 2–2 | — | – |
| 4 | (Estonia) Pärnu JK | 3 | 0 | 0 | 3 | 3 | 12 | −9 | 0 | | – | – | 2–3 | — |

Source: RSSSFGroup A8
(H) Hosts

==== Group A9 ====
| Pos | Team | Pld | W | D | L | GF | GA | GD | Pts | Qualification | ALM | FEM | NCH | R93 |
|---|---|---|---|---|---|---|---|---|---|---|---|---|---|---|
| 1 | (Kazakhstan) Alma | 3 | 3 | 0 | 0 | 13 | 1 | +12 | 9 | Advance to second qualifying round | — | – | 5–0 | 5–0 |
| 2 | (Hungary) Femina | 3 | 2 | 0 | 1 | 9 | 3 | +6 | 6 | | 1–3 | — | – | 6–0 |
| 3 | (Moldova) Narta Chişinău (H) | 3 | 1 | 0 | 2 | 3 | 8 | −5 | 3 | | – | 0–2 | — | – |
| 4 | (Azerbaijan) Ruslan-93 | 3 | 0 | 0 | 3 | 1 | 14 | −13 | 0 | | – | – | 1–3 | — |

Source: RSSSFGroup A9
(H) Hosts

==== Group A10 ====
| Pos | Team | Pld | W | D | L | GF | GA | GD | Pts | Qualification | SPR | CLU | MHO | KOK |
|---|---|---|---|---|---|---|---|---|---|---|---|---|---|---|
| 1 | (Czech Republic) Sparta Prague | 3 | 2 | 1 | 0 | 24 | 4 | +20 | 7 | Advance to second qualifying round | — | 1–1 | – | 19–0 |
| 2 | (Romania) Clujana Cluj-Napoca | 3 | 2 | 1 | 0 | 15 | 1 | +14 | 7 | Advance to second qualifying round | – | — | 3–0 | – |
| 3 | (Israel) Maccabi Holon | 3 | 1 | 0 | 2 | 8 | 8 | 0 | 3 | | 3–4 | – | — | 5–1 |
| 4 | (Cyprus) AEK Kokkinochorion | 3 | 0 | 0 | 3 | 1 | 35 | −34 | 0 | | – | 0–11 | – | — |

Source: RSSSFGroup A10

=== Second qualifying round ===
==== Group B1 ====
| Pos | Team | Pld | W | D | L | GF | GA | GD | Pts | Qualification | ARS | BAR | NEU | ALM |
|---|---|---|---|---|---|---|---|---|---|---|---|---|---|---|
| 1 | (England) Arsenal (H) | 3 | 2 | 1 | 0 | 14 | 3 | +11 | 7 | Advance to quarter-finals | — | – | 7–0 | 4–0 |
| 2 | (Italy) Bardolino | 3 | 2 | 1 | 0 | 11 | 6 | +5 | 7 | Advance to quarter-finals | 3–3 | — | 3–2 | – |
| 3 | (Austria) Neulengbach | 3 | 1 | 0 | 2 | 5 | 10 | −5 | 3 | | – | – | — | 3–0 |
| 4 | (Kazakhstan) Alma | 3 | 0 | 0 | 3 | 1 | 12 | −11 | 0 | | – | 1–5 | – | — |

Source: RSSSFGroup B1
(H) Hosts

==== Group B2 ====
| Pos | Team | Pld | W | D | L | GF | GA | GD | Pts | Qualification | UME | ROS | UVI | CLU |
|---|---|---|---|---|---|---|---|---|---|---|---|---|---|---|
| 1 | (Sweden) Umeå (H) | 3 | 2 | 1 | 0 | 7 | 3 | +4 | 7 | Advance to quarter-finals | — | – | 2–0 | 3–1 |
| 2 | (Russia) Rossiyanka | 3 | 2 | 1 | 0 | 7 | 4 | +3 | 7 | Advance to quarter-finals | 2–2 | — | 3–1 | – |
| 3 | (Belarus) Universitet Vitebsk | 3 | 1 | 0 | 2 | 2 | 5 | −3 | 3 | | – | – | — | 1–0 |
| 4 | (Romania) Clujana Cluj-Napoca | 3 | 0 | 0 | 3 | 2 | 6 | −4 | 0 | | – | 1–2 | – | — |

Source: RSSSFGroup B2
(H) Hosts

==== Group B3 ====
| Pos | Team | Pld | W | D | L | GF | GA | GD | Pts | Qualification | FRA | WEZ | EVE | VAL |
|---|---|---|---|---|---|---|---|---|---|---|---|---|---|---|
| 1 | (Germany) Frankfurt | 3 | 2 | 1 | 0 | 6 | 3 | +3 | 7 | Advance to quarter-finals | — | – | 2–1 | 3–1 |
| 2 | (Belgium) Rapide Wezemaal (H) | 3 | 1 | 1 | 1 | 3 | 6 | −3 | 4 | Advance to quarter-finals | 1–1 | — | 2–1 | – |
| 3 | (England) Everton | 3 | 1 | 0 | 2 | 5 | 5 | 0 | 3 | | – | – | — | 3–1 |
| 4 | (Iceland) Valur | 3 | 1 | 0 | 2 | 6 | 6 | 0 | 3 | | – | 4–0 | – | — |

Source: RSSSFGroup B3
(H) Hosts

==== Group B4 ====
| Pos | Team | Pld | W | D | L | GF | GA | GD | Pts | Qualification | BRØ | LYO | KOL | SPR |
|---|---|---|---|---|---|---|---|---|---|---|---|---|---|---|
| 1 | (Denmark) Brøndby | 3 | 2 | 1 | 0 | 3 | 1 | +2 | 7 | Advance to quarter-finals | — | 0–0 | – | 2–1 |
| 2 | (France) Lyon (H) | 3 | 2 | 1 | 0 | 3 | 1 | +2 | 7 | Advance to quarter-finals | – | — | 1–0 | – |
| 3 | (Norway) Kolbotn | 3 | 1 | 0 | 2 | 3 | 3 | 0 | 3 | | 0–1 | – | — | 3–1 |
| 4 | (Czech Republic) Sparta Prague | 3 | 0 | 0 | 3 | 3 | 7 | −4 | 0 | | – | 1–2 | – | — |

Source: RSSSFGroup B4
(H) Hosts

== Knockout phase ==
=== Bracket ===
Quarter-finals
(France) Lyon | 0 | 3 | 3
(England) Arsenal | 0 | 2 | 2
(Belgium) Rapide Wezemaal | 0 | 0 | 0
(Sweden) Umeå | 4 | 6 | 10
(Russia) Rossiyanka | 0 | 1 | 1
(Germany) Frankfurt | 0 | 2 | 2
(Italy) Bardolino | 0 | 1 | 1 (3)
(Denmark) Brøndby | 1 | 0 | 1 (2)

Semi-finals
(France) Lyon | 1 | 0 | 1
(Sweden) Umeå (a) | 1 | 0 | 1
(Germany) Frankfurt | 4 | 3 | 7
(Italy) Bardolino | 2 | 0 | 2

Final
(Sweden) Umeå | 1 | 2 | 3
(Germany) Frankfurt | 1 | 3 | 4

=== Quarter-finals ===
The first legs was played on 14 & 15 November 2007, and the second legs on 21 & 22 November 2007.

| Team 1 | Agg. | Team 2 | 1st leg | 2nd leg |
|---|---|---|---|---|
| Lyon (France) | 3–2 | (England) Arsenal | 0–0 | 3–2 |
| Rapide Wezemaal (Belgium) | 0–10 | (Sweden) Umeå | 0–4 | 0–6 |
| Rossiyanka (Russia) | 1–2 | (Germany) Frankfurt | 0–0 | 1–2 |
| Bardolino (Italy) | 1–1 (3–2 p) | (Denmark) Brøndby | 0–1 | 1–0 (a.e.t.) |

=== Semi-finals ===
The first legs are scheduled to be played on 29 March and the second leg on 6 April 2008.

| Team 1 | Agg. | Team 2 | 1st leg | 2nd leg |
|---|---|---|---|---|
| Lyon (France) | 1–1 (a) | (Sweden) Umeå | 1–1 | 0–0 |
| Frankfurt (Germany) | 7–2 | (Italy) Bardolino | 4–2 | 3–0 |

=== Final ===
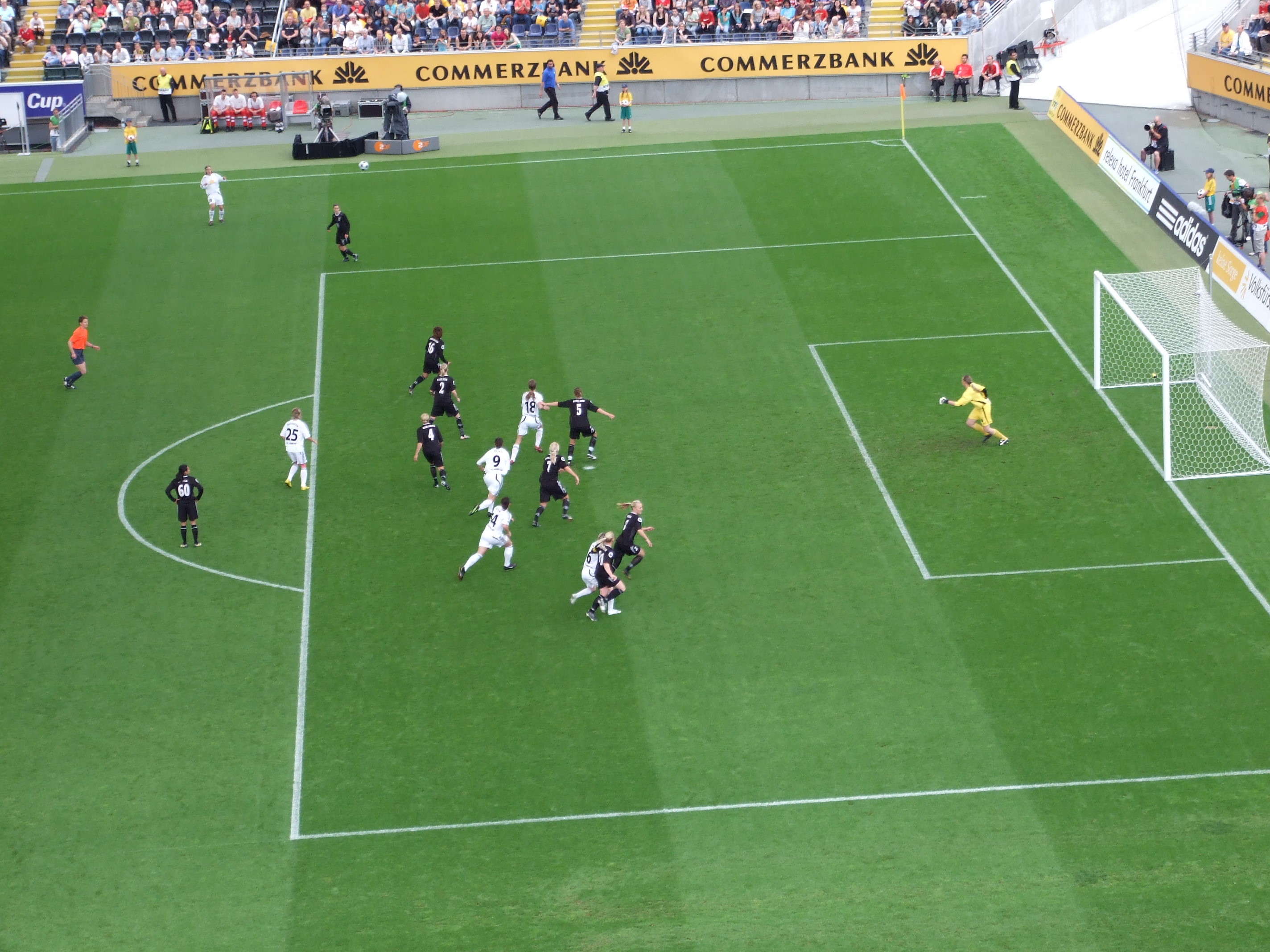
attack against Umeå

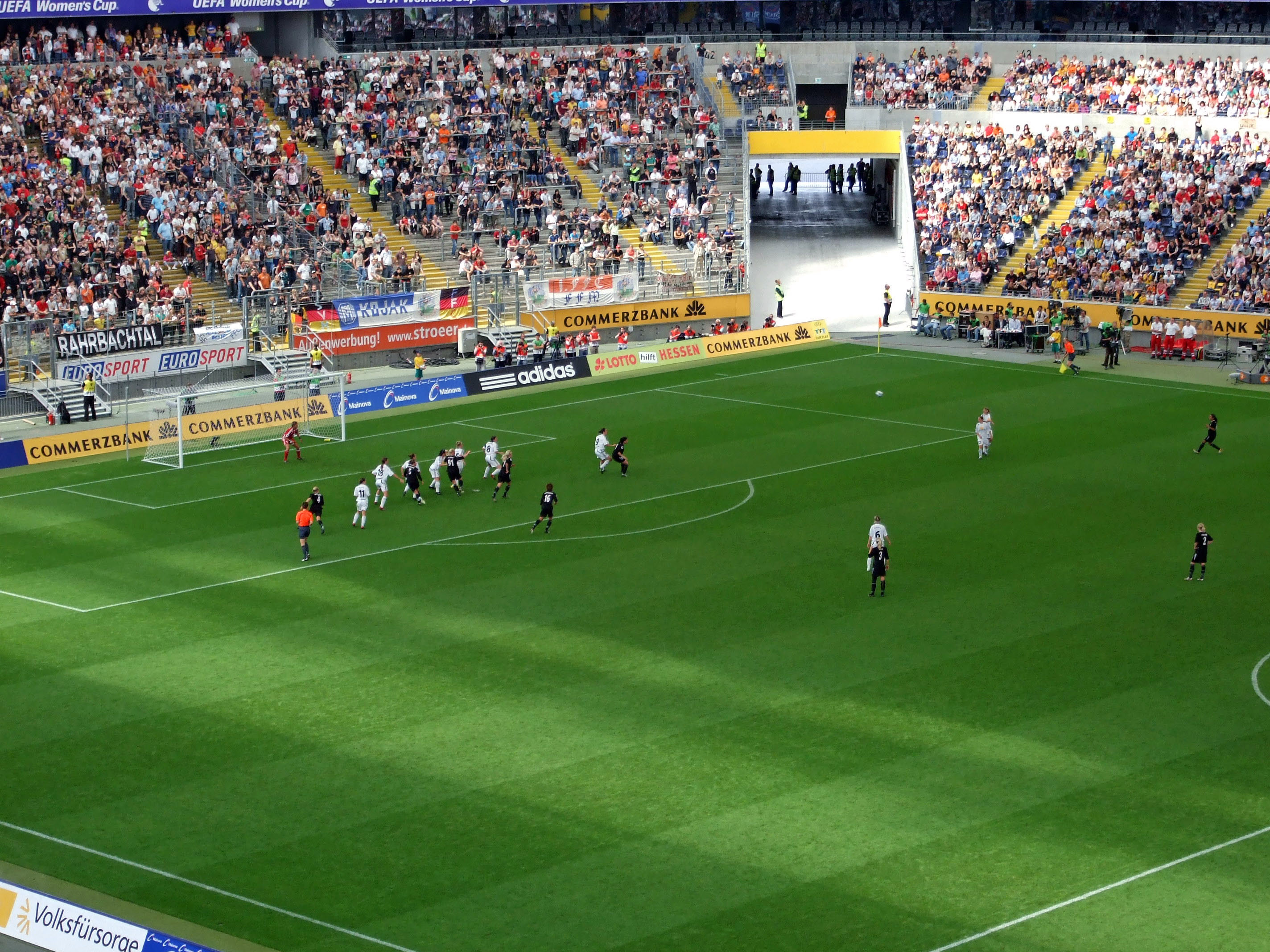
attack against 1. FFC

The first leg was played o 17 May 2008, and the second leg on 24 May 2008.

| Team 1 | Agg. | Team 2 | 1st leg | 2nd leg |
|---|---|---|---|---|
| Umeå (Sweden) | 3–4 | (Germany) Frankfurt | 1–1 | 2–3 |

17 May 2008
13:00 UTC+2

| Umeå (Sweden) | 1–1 | (Germany) Frankfurt |
|---|---|---|
| Marta 1' | Report | Pohlers 5' |

Gammliavallen, Umeå
Attendance: 4,128
Referee: Gyöngyi Gaál (Hungary)
24 May 2008
14:15 UTC+2

| Frankfurt (Germany) | 3–2 | (Sweden) Umeå |
|---|---|---|
| Pohlers 7', 55'; Wimbersky 71' | Report | Dahlqvist 68' (pen.); Östberg 83' |

Commerzbank-Arena, Frankfurt
Attendance: 27,640
Referee: Alexandra Ihringova (England)

Frankfurt won 4–3 on aggregate

UEFA Women's Cup
2007–08 Winner
(Germany)
Frankfurt
Third title

== Top goalscorers ==
(excluding qualifying rounds)

| Rank | Player | Team | Goals |
|---|---|---|---|
| 1 | (Brazil) Marta | Umeå | 5 |
| 1 | (Germany) Conny Pohlers | Frankfurt | 5 |
| 3 | (Sweden) Madelaine Edlund | Umeå | 3 |
| 3 | (Germany) Birgit Prinz | Frankfurt | 3 |
