= Valentina Boni =

Italian football midfielder

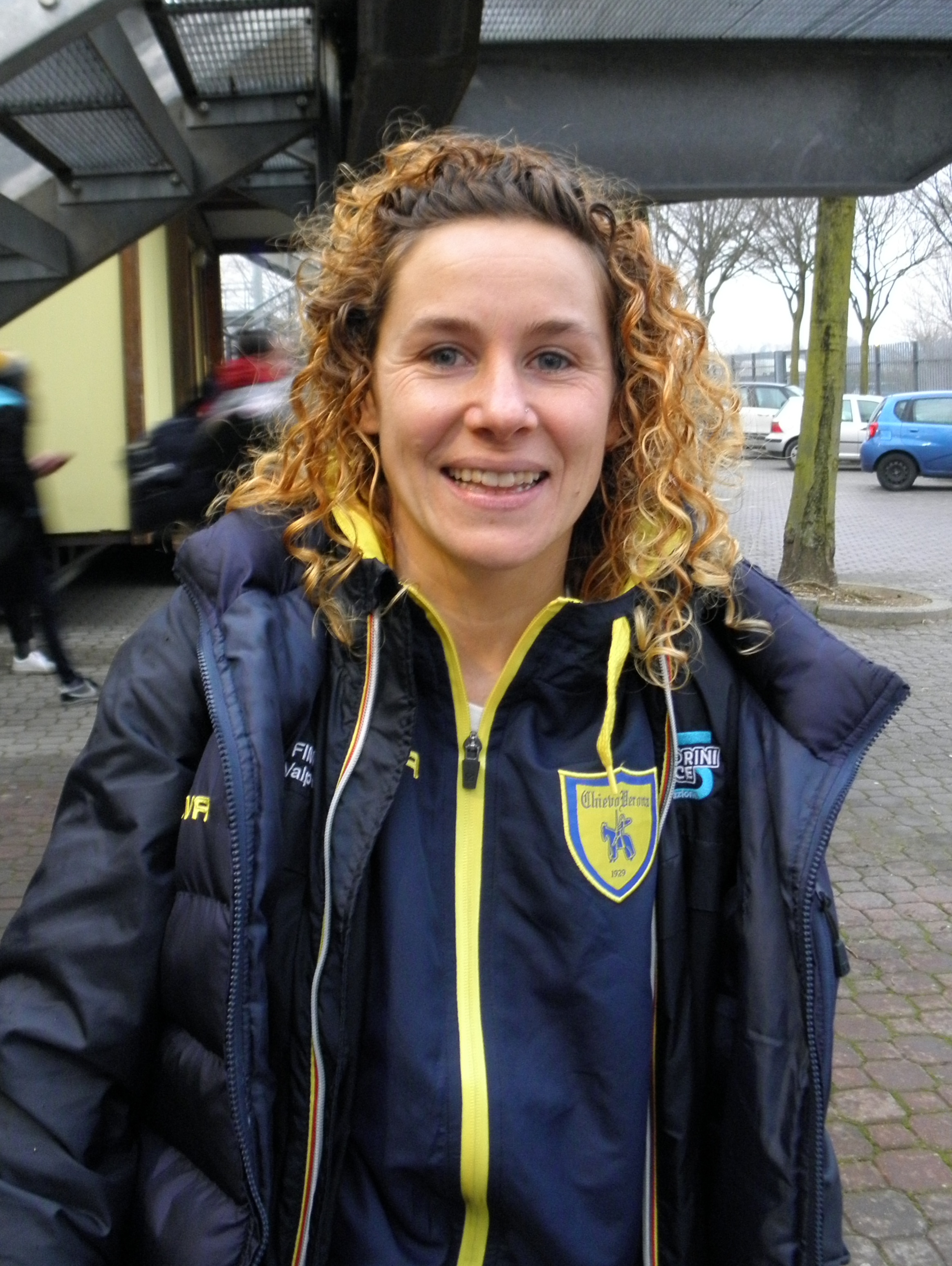
- Boni in 2018

Personal information
- Full name: Valentina Boni
- Date of birth: 14 March 1983 (age 43)
- Place of birth: Peschiera del Garda, Italy
- Height: 1.55 m (5 ft 1 in)
- Positions: Midfielder; striker

Team information
- Current team: ASD Fimauto Valpolicella

Senior career*
Years	Team	Apps	(Gls)
2000–2003	Bardolino		
2003–2004	Lazio		
2004–2010	Bardolino		(104)
2010–2013	Brescia		
2013–	ASD Fimauto Valpolicella		

International career
2001–	Italy		
- * Club domestic league appearances and goals

Valentina Boni is an Italian football midfielder currently playing for ASD Fimauto Valpolicella. She previously spent three years at ACF Brescia in Serie A. She has won four leagues with CF Bardolino, and she was the league's top scorer in 2005, tied with Patrizia Panico at 32 goals.

She is a member of the Italian national team, and played the 2005 European Championship.
