= Gol Częstochowa =

Polish football club

ISD-AJD Gol Częstochowa
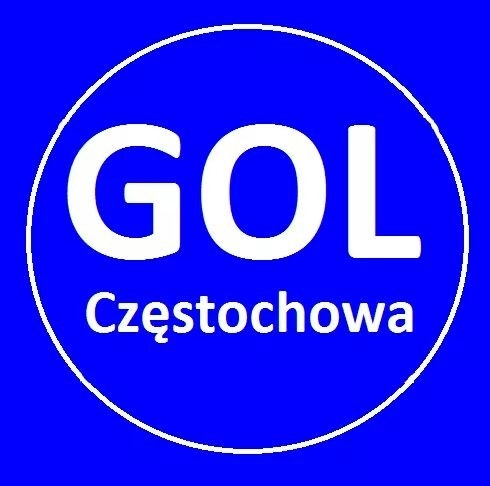
- Full name: Uczniowski Klub Sportowy Gol Częstochowa
- Founded: 1996; 29 years ago
- Capacity: 8,000
- 2019–20: I liga, 10th of 12 (relegated)

ISD-AJD Gol Częstochowa is a Polish women's football club from Częstochowa. They withdrew from senior competition at the end of the 2019–20 season.

== Initial seasons ==
The team played in the highest league in 2004–05 but didn't qualify for the then new founded Ekstraliga. In the following campaign, they won the second division title without suffering a loss, and promotion to the Ekstraliga was achieved.

After three seasons in the top-tier, the club was relegated to the I liga at the end of the 2008–09 season. They remained in the second tier until withdrawing from senior competition in 2020, with an exception of the 2013–14 season spent in the highest division.

Its greatest success was finishing the 2006–07 season as runners-up and the following participation in the 2007–08 UEFA Women's Cup first qualifying round.

In 2008, the team played under the name AZS Częstochowa.
