= 1971 in association football =

The following are the football (soccer) events of the year 1971 throughout the world.

== Events ==
- January 2 – Second Ibrox disaster. Barriers on Stairway 13 at Ibrox Park give way under a crush of fans departing a Rangers–Celtic match, killing 66 and injuring over 200.
- 17 April 1971 – France and the Netherlands played the first women's international football match recognized by FIFA against the France. The match took place in Hazebrouck, France and resulted in a 4–0 defeat for the Netherlands with Jocelyne Ratignier scoring a hattrick and Marie-Claire Caron-Harant scoring once.
- Copa Libertadores:Won by Nacional after defeating Estudiantes La Plata on an aggregate score of 2–0.
- May 20 – Ajax claims the KNVB Cup by defeating Sparta Rotterdam in the second leg, 2–1.
- 9 May – The very first Women's FA Cup in England, the Mitre Challenge Trophy for women's professional soccer football, was won when Southampton Women's F.C. defeated Stewarton Thistle, 4 to 1, in the final held at Crystal Palace National Sports Centre. Pat Davies scored three of her team's four goals and Dot Cassell contributed the lone Stewarton score.

== Winners club national championship ==
=== Asia ===
- Iran: Taj
- Qatar: Al-Oruba

=== Europe ===
- England: Arsenal
- France: Olympique de Marseille
- Italy: Inter Milan
- Netherlands: Feyenoord
- Scotland: Celtic
- Spain: Valencia
- Turkey: Galatasaray
- West Germany: Borussia Mönchengladbach

=== North America ===
- Mexico: Club América
- United States / Canada:
  - Dallas Tornado (NASL)

=== South America ===
- Brazil: Atlético Mineiro

== International tournaments ==
- 1971 British Home Championship (May 15 – May 22, 1971)

England

- Pan American Games in Colombia (July 31 – August 12, 1971)
  - Gold Medal: Argentina
  - Silver Medal: Colombia
  - Bronze Medal: Cuba

== Births ==
=== January ===
- January 1 – Juan Carlos Plata, Guatemalan footballer and coach
- January 2 – Slobodan Komljenović, Serbian footballer
- January 5 – Bjørn Otto Bragstad, Norwegian footballer
- January 8 – Jesper Jansson, Swedish footballer
- January 10 – Rudi Istenič, Slovenian footballer
- January 14 – Bert Konterman, Dutch footballer
- January 14 – Antonis Nikopolidis, Greek goalkeeper
- January 16 – Ulrich van Gobbel, Dutch footballer
- January 18 – Pep Guardiola, Spanish footballer
- January 26 – Giuseppe Pancaro, Italian footballer
- January 29 – Jörg Albertz, German footballer
- January 31 – Georgios Karathanasis, Swedish former professional footballer

=== February ===
- February 1 – Joaquín Hernández, Mexican footballer
- February 1 – Zlatko Zahovič, Slovenian footballer
- February 1 – Marcelinho Carioca, Brazilian footballer
- February 2 – Osvaldo Peralta, Paraguayan footballer
- February 4 – Maarten Atmodikoro, Dutch footballer
- February 17 – Carlos Gamarra, Paraguayan footballer
- February 20 – Jari Litmanen, Finnish footballer

=== March ===
- March 1 – Avi Pitusi, Israeli football manager and former player
- March 4 – Jovan Stanković, Serbian footballer
- March 11 – Kokos Elia, Cypriot former international footballer
- March 13
  - Juraj Mintál, retired Slovak footballer
  - Allan Nielsen, Danish footballer
- March 15 – Joachim Björklund, Swedish footballer
- March 18 – Jerzy Brzęczek, Polish footballer
- March 18 – Fernando Ochoaizpur, Bolivian footballer
- March 24 – Conny Rosén, Swedish former footballer
- March 26 – Liviu Ciobotariu, Romanian footballer

=== April ===
- April 2 – Francisco Arce, Paraguayan international
- April 2 – Edmundo Alves de Souza Neto, Brazilian footballer
- April 5 – Choi Eun-sung, South Korean club player
- April 7
  - Daniel Albert, former Israeli footballer
  - Franky Vandendriessche, Belgian goalkeeper
- April 8 – Kim Byung-ji, South Korean international goalkeeper
- April 9 – Víctor López, Uruguayan footballer
- April 13
  - Mariano Aguilar, Spanish retired footballer
  - Steven Lustü, Danish footballer and coach
- April 14
  - Miguel Calero, Colombian international (d. 2012)
  - Jérôme Sykora, French former professional footballer
- April 15 – Finidi George, Nigerian footballer
- April 17 – José Francisco Cevallos, Ecuadorian footballer, Minister of Sports in Ecuador and President of Barcelona F.C.
- April 23 – Hjalmar Zambrano, Ecuadorian footballer

=== May ===
- May 1 – Mariusz Luncik, Polish former professional footballer
- May 14 – Martin Reim, Estonian footballer

=== June ===
- June 3 – Luigi Di Biagio, Italian footballer
- June 5 – Francisco Gabriel de Anda, Mexican footballer and analyst
- June 9
  - Gilles De Bilde, Belgian footballer
  - Uladzimir Zhuravel, Belarusian footballer and coach (d. 2018)
- June 11 – Valeri Smolkov, former Russian professional footballer
- June 14 – Håkan Mild, Swedish footballer
- June 23 – Enrique Romero, Spanish footballer
- June 24 – Thomas Helveg, Danish international
- June 25 – Neil Lennon, Northern Irish footballer and manager
- June 28 – Fabien Barthez, French footballer

=== July ===
- July 26 – Mladen Rudonja, Slovenian footballer
- July 31 – Elivélton, Brazilian international footballer
- July 31 – Ignacio Vázquez, Mexican footballer

=== August ===
- August 9 – Oswald Snip, Dutch footballer
- August 10 – Roy Keane, Irish footballer and manager
- August 16 – Rick Slor, Dutch footballer
- August 18 – Patrik Andersson, Swedish footballer
- August 19
  - Marios Pefkos, retired Cypriot footballer
  - Miguel Ponce, Chilean footballer
- August 23
  - Demetrio Albertini, Italian footballer
  - Florent Delay, retired Swiss footballer
- August 26 – Osman Özköylü, Turkish footballer
- August 27 – Ernest Faber, Dutch footballer
- August 29 – Marco Sandy, Bolivian footballer

=== September ===
- September 1
  - Gilles Frechingues, French former professional footballer
  - Hakan Şükür, Turkish footballer
- September 3 – Ángel Lemus, Mexican footballer
- September 3 – Paolo Montero, Uruguayan footballer
- September 9 – Mikel Lasa, Spanish footballer
- September 9 – Johan Mjällby, Swedish footballer
- September 13 – Mladen Dabanovič, Slovenian footballer
- September 17 – Edílson, Brazilian footballer
- September 18 – Filip Apelstav, Swedish footballer
- September 20 – Henrik Larsson, Swedish footballer and manager
- September 29 – Miguel Fuentes, Mexican footballer
- September 29 – Jeffrey Talan, Dutch footballer

=== October ===
- October 4 – Jorge Costa, Portuguese footballer
- October 5 – Bertrand Crasson, Belgian footballer
- October 7 – Ismael Urzaiz, Spanish footballer
- October 8 – Miran Pavlin, Slovenian footballer
- October 13 – André Bergdølmo, Norwegian footballer
- October 15 – Andy Cole, English footballer
- October 15 – Niko Kovač, Croatian footballer
- October 16 – Geert De Vlieger, Belgian footballer
- October 18 – Yoo Sang-chul, South Korean footballer
- October 21 – René Ponk, Dutch footballer
- October 25 – Geoffrey Prommayon, Dutch footballer
- October 26 – Didier Martel, French footballer
- October 27 – Theodoros Zagorakis, Greek footballer

=== November ===
- November 3 – Dwight Yorke, Trinidadian and Tobagonian footballer
- November 12 – Robert Jones, English former professional footballer
- November 13
  - Unai Emery, Spanish footballer and manager
  - Erwin Ramírez, Ecuadorian footballer
- November 16 – Mustapha Hadji, Moroccan footballer
- November 17
  - Jamie Murphy, English former professional footballer
  - Vladimir Shutov, former Russian footballer
- November 30 – Pedro Pineda, Mexican footballer

=== December ===
- December 2 – Francesco Toldo, Italian footballer
- December 3 – Henk Timmer, Dutch footballer
- December 7 – Spira Grujić, Serbian footballer
- December 8 – Abdullah Ercan, Turkish footballer
- December 14 – Arsenio Benítez, Paraguayan footballer
- December 26 – Mika Nurmela, Finnish footballer
- December 28 – Sergi Barjuán, Spanish footballer
- December 29 – Niclas Alexandersson, Swedish footballer

== Deaths ==
- June 30 – Georgi Asparuhov (28), Bulgarian footballer (born 1943)
- June 30 – Nikola Kotkov (32), Bulgarian footballer (born 1938)
- July 13 – Harry Dénis (74), Dutch footballer (born 1896)
- August 5 – Ber Groosjohan (74), Dutch footballer (born 1897)
