= Lesley Lloyd =

English footballer

Senior career*
Years	Team	Apps	(Gls)
1970–1979	Southampton Women's F.C.		
- * Club domestic league appearances and goals

Lesley Lloyd is a former English footballer who is best known for being the team captain for Southampton Women's F.C. for the 1971 WFA Cup Final win in the tournament's inaugural year. They beat Stewarton Thistle 4–1 in the final held at Crystal Palace National Sports Centre.

Lloyd led Southampton to glory for a second time in the 1972 WFA Cup final against Lees Ladies at Eton Park, the former ground of Burton Albion F.C. Southampton won 3–2.

== Honours ==
Southampton

- FA Women's Cup: 1970–71, 1971–72
