= 1972 WFA Cup final =

1972 WFA Cup Final
- Event: 1971–72 WFA Cup
Southampton	Lee's
3	2
- Date: 7 May 1972
- Venue: Eton Park, Burton upon Trent
- Referee: W. Tidman (Bedworth)
- Attendance: 1,500

The 1972 WFA Cup Final was the second final of the WFA Cup, England's primary cup competition for women's football teams. The showpiece event was played under the auspices of the Women's Football Association (WFA). The final was a replay of the 1971 final, as Southampton and Lee's (formerly Stewarton Thistle) and was contested at Eton Park, the former home stadium of Burton Albion. Southampton won the match 3–2.

== Match details ==
7 May 1972
15:45 BST

Southampton	3–2	Lee's
Judd; Lopez	Report	White; Ferries

Eton Park, Burton upon Trent
Attendance: 1,500
Referee: W. Tidman (Bedworth)

GK	1	(England) Sue Buckett
DF	2	(England) Karen Buchanan
DF	3	(England) Pauline Dickie
DF	4	(Wales) Jill Osman
DF	5	(England) Jill Long
MF	6	(England) Maureen Case
MF	7	(England) Lynda Hale
MF	8	(England) Lesley Lloyd (c)
MF	9	(England) Pat Judd
FW	10	(England) Sue Lopez
FW	11	(England) Pat Davies
Substitutes:
FW	12	(England) Sue Stubbs
GK	13	(England) Shirley O'Callaghan
Manager:
(England) Norman Holloway

GK	1	(Scotland) Gerry Chalmers
DF	2	(Scotland) Betty Brogan
DF	3	(Scotland) Mary-Jane Lindsay
DF	4	(Scotland) Linda Kidd
DF	5	(Scotland) Jean Hunter
MF	6	(Scotland) Sandra Walker
MF	7	(Scotland) Rose Reilly (c)
MF	8	(Scotland) Jan Lightbody
MF	9	(Scotland) Susie Ferries
FW	10	(Scotland) Sophia McDonalds
FW	11	(Scotland) Mary White
Substitutes:
FW	12	(Scotland) Margaret McCunnis
DF	13	(Scotland) Isobel Howie
Manager:
(Scotland) Elsie Cook

== Bibliography ==
- Lopez, Sue (1997). Women on the Ball: A Guide to Women's Football. London, England: Scarlet Press. ISBN 1857270169.
