= Louise Cross =

English footballer

Personal information
- Position: Winger

Senior career*
Years	Team	Apps	(Gls)
1972–1982	Southampton Women's F.C.		

International career
1971	England	4	(0)
- * Club domestic league appearances and goals

Louise Cross is a British former amateur footballer. She played for the unofficial England women's national football team — calling themselves the "British Independents", now known as the "Lost Lionesses" in 1971, including at the 1971 Women's World Cup in Mexico.

In her club career, Cross was named on the substitutes bench for the first ever WFA Cup final in 1971. Southampton beat Stewarton Thistle 4‍–‍1.

== Honours ==
Southampton

- FA Women's Cup: 1970–71
