= Mintal =

Mintal may refer to:

- Mintal, Davao City, a barangay with Japanese cultural heritage in Tugbok District, Davao City, Philippines
- Juraj Mintál (born 1971), Slovak footballer
- Marek Mintál (born 1977), Slovak professional footballer and coach
