= Daniel Albert =

Daniel Albert may refer to:

- Daniel Albert (footballer) (born 1971), Israeli footballer
- Daniel G. Albert (1901–1983), New York politician and judge
- Daniel M. Albert (born 1936), American ophthalmologist and cancer researcher
