= 1970–71 FA Cup =

Tournament details
- Country: England; Wales

Final positions
- Champions: Arsenal (4th title)
- Runners-up: Liverpool
- Third place: Stoke City
- Fourth place: Everton

Tournament statistics
- Top goal scorer: Ted MacDougall (6 goals)

The 1970–71 FA Cup was the 90th season of the world's oldest football cup competition, the Football Association Challenge Cup, commonly known as the FA Cup. First Division champions Arsenal won the competition for the fourth time, defeating Liverpool 2–1 in the final at Wembley. In doing so, Arsenal were the fourth team to complete a double of League and Cup victories, following Preston North End, Aston Villa and Tottenham Hotspur.

Matches were scheduled to be played at the stadium of the team named first on the date specified for each round, which was always a Saturday. Some matches, however, might be rescheduled for other days if there were clashes with games for other competitions or the weather was inclement. If scores were level after 90 minutes had been played, a replay would take place at the stadium of the second-named team later the same week. If the replayed match was drawn further replays would be held until a winner was determined. If scores were level after 90 minutes had been played in a replay, a 30-minute period of extra time would be played.

== Calendar ==
Round	Date
Preliminary round	Saturday 5 September 1970
First round qualifying	Saturday 19 September 1970
Second round qualifying	Saturday 10 October 1970
Third round qualifying	Saturday 24 October 1970
Fourth round qualifying	Saturday 7 November 1970
First round proper	Saturday 21 November 1970
Second round proper	Saturday 12 December 1970
Third round proper	Saturday 2 January 1971
Fourth round proper	Saturday 23 January 1971
Fifth round proper	Saturday 13 February 1971
Sixth round proper	Saturday 6 March 1971
Semi-finals	Saturday 27 March 1971
Final	Saturday 8 May 1971

== Qualifying rounds ==
Most participating clubs that were not members of the Football League competed in the qualifying rounds to secure one of 28 places available in the first round.

The winners from the fourth qualifying round were South Shields, Bradford Park Avenue, Scarborough, Rhyl, Bangor City, Great Harwood, Wigan Athletic, Hereford United, Tamworth, Grantham, Boston United, Chelmsford City, Barnet, Oxford City, Wycombe Wanderers, Cheltenham Town, Slough Town, Aveley, Bishop's Stortford, Hendon, Ringmer, Crawley Town, Walton & Hersham, Margate, Wimbledon, Yeovil Town, Minehead and Weymouth.

Those appearing in the competition proper for the first time were Great Harwood, Aveley, Bishop's Stortford, Ringmer, Crawley Town and Minehead. Of the others, Rhyl had last featured at this stage in 1962–63 and Slough Town had last done so in 1945–46 (during their short-lived Slough United amalgamation).

Rhyl had qualified for the first round of the FA Cup in a competition-record 15 consecutive seasons up to and including 1962–63. This season the club played in 12 matches across seven rounds of the tournament, defeating Pwllheli & District, Porthmadog, Oswestry Town (after a replay), South Liverpool (after a second replay), Hartlepool and Barnsley (after another second replay) before going out to Swansea City at Vetch Field in the third round. However, this season also saw Rhyl's consecutive qualification record finally broken by Hereford United in that club's penultimate non-league season before being voted into the Football League.

== Results ==
=== First round proper ===
At this stage the 48 clubs from the Football League Third and Fourth Divisions joined the non-league clubs who came through the qualifying rounds. To complete this round, four additional non-league clubs were given byes. Macclesfield Town and Telford United were the finalists from the inaugural FA Trophy competition held during the previous season, while Enfield and Dagenham were the finalists from the previous season's FA Amateur Cup.

Matches were scheduled to be played on Saturday, 21 November 1970, with the exception of the Great Harwood–Rotherham United match which was played the following Tuesday. Nine matches were drawn, with Scunthorpe United and Tranmere Rovers needing a second replay at Goodison Park to settle their tie (in Scunthorpe's favour).

Tie no	Home team	Score	Away team	Date
1	Enfield	0–1	Cambridge United	21 November 1970
2	Chesterfield	2–0	Halifax Town	21 November 1970
3	Darlington	5–1	Bangor City	21 November 1970
4	Barnet	6–1	Newport County	21 November 1970
5	Grantham	2–1	Stockport County	21 November 1970
6	Preston North End	1–1	Chester	21 November 1970
Replay	Chester	1–0	Preston North End	25 November 1970
7	Rochdale	2–0	Oldham Athletic	21 November 1970
8	Yeovil Town	1–0	Aveley	21 November 1970
9	Reading	6–1	Bishop's Stortford	21 November 1970
10	Walsall	3–0	Plymouth Argyle	21 November 1970
11	Notts County	1–0	Port Vale	21 November 1970
12	Grimsby Town	0–1	Bury	21 November 1970
13	Crewe Alexandra	0–0	Doncaster Rovers	21 November 1970
Replay	Doncaster Rovers	1–3	Crewe Alexandra	24 November 1970
14	Lincoln City	2–1	Barrow	21 November 1970
15	Scarborough	2–3	Workington	21 November 1970
16	Tranmere Rovers	1–1	Scunthorpe United	21 November 1970
Replay	Scunthorpe United	0–0	Tranmere Rovers	24 November 1970
Replay	Tranmere Rovers	0–1	Scunthorpe United	30 November 1970
17	Wycombe Wanderers	1–1	Slough Town	21 November 1970
Replay	Slough Town	1–0	Wycombe Wanderers	25 November 1970
18	Oxford City	1–1	Bournemouth & Boscombe Athletic	21 November 1970
Replay	Bournemouth & Boscombe Athletic	8–1	Oxford City	25 November 1970
19	Fulham	1–2	Bristol Rovers	21 November 1970
20	Barnsley	1–0	Bradford Park Avenue	21 November 1970
21	Brentford	2–1	Gillingham	21 November 1970
22	Great Harwood	2–6	Rotherham United	24 November 1970
23	Brighton & Hove Albion	4–0	Cheltenham Town	21 November 1970
24	Rhyl	1–0	Hartlepool	21 November 1970
25	Bradford City	3–2	Macclesfield Town	21 November 1970
26	Southend United	7–0	Weymouth	21 November 1970
27	Mansfield Town	2–0	Wrexham	21 November 1970
28	Minehead	1–2	Shrewsbury Town	21 November 1970
29	Southport	0–2	Boston United	21 November 1970
30	Torquay United	3–1	Aston Villa	21 November 1970
31	Hereford United	2–2	Northampton Town	21 November 1970
Replay	Northampton Town	1–2	Hereford United	24 November 1970
32	Tamworth	0–0	York City	21 November 1970
Replay	York City	5–0	Tamworth	23 November 1970
33	Peterborough United	3–1	Wimbledon	21 November 1970
34	South Shields	1–1	Wigan Athletic	21 November 1970
Replay	Wigan Athletic	2–0	South Shields	23 November 1970
35	Colchester United	3–0	Ringmer	21 November 1970
36	Walton & Hersham	2–5	Telford United	21 November 1970
37	Hendon	0–2	Aldershot	21 November 1970
38	Dagenham	2–0	Margate	21 November 1970
39	Crawley Town	1–1	Chelmsford City	21 November 1970
Replay	Chelmsford City	6–1	Crawley Town	23 November 1970
40	Swansea City	4–1	Exeter City	21 November 1970

=== Second round proper ===
The matches were scheduled for Saturday, 12 December 1970. Six matches were drawn, with replays taking place later the same week or the week after. The Lincoln City–Bradford City match required a second replay, which was played on the 21 December.

Tie no	Home team	Score	Away team	Date
1	Chester	1–0	Crewe Alexandra	12 December 1970
2	Chesterfield	0–0	Workington	12 December 1970
Replay	Workington	3–2	Chesterfield	16 December 1970
3	Darlington	0–2	Rochdale	12 December 1970
4	Bournemouth & Boscombe Athletic	0–1	Yeovil Town	12 December 1970
5	Bury	1–1	Notts County	12 December 1970
Replay	Notts County	3–0	Bury	21 December 1970
6	Grantham	1–4	Rotherham United	12 December 1970
7	Lincoln City	2–2	Bradford City	12 December 1970
Replay	Bradford City	2–2	Lincoln City	16 December 1970
Replay	Lincoln City	4–1	Bradford City	21 December 1970
8	Shrewsbury Town	2–2	Reading	12 December 1970
Replay	Reading	1–0	Shrewsbury Town	21 December 1970
9	Brentford	1–0	Walsall	12 December 1970
10	Rhyl	0–0	Barnsley	12 December 1970
Replay	Barnsley	1–1	Rhyl	15 December 1970
Replay	Rhyl	2–0	Barnsley	21 December 1970
11	Southend United	1–0	Dagenham	12 December 1970
12	Scunthorpe United	3–0	Mansfield Town	12 December 1970
13	Hereford United	1–2	Brighton & Hove Albion	12 December 1970
14	Aldershot	1–1	Bristol Rovers	12 December 1970
Replay	Bristol Rovers	1–3	Aldershot	15 December 1970
15	Wigan Athletic	2–1	Peterborough United	12 December 1970
16	Boston United	1–2	York City	12 December 1970
17	Colchester United	3–0	Cambridge United	12 December 1970
18	Chelmsford City	0–1	Torquay United	12 December 1970
19	Slough Town	0–1	Barnet	12 December 1970
20	Swansea City	6–2	Telford United	12 December 1970

=== Third round proper ===
The 44 First and Second Division clubs entered the competition at this stage. The matches were scheduled Saturday, 2 January 1971, but ten were played at later dates. Seven matches were drawn and went to replays. Yeovil Town, Rhyl, Wigan Athletic and Barnet were the last non-league clubs left in the competition.

Tie no	Home team	Score	Away team	Date
1	Blackpool	4–0	West Ham United	2 January 1971
2	Chester	1–2	Derby County	2 January 1971
3	Barnet	0–1	Colchester United	5 January 1971
4	Liverpool	1–0	Aldershot	2 January 1971
5	Rochdale	2–1	Coventry City	11 January 1971
6	Southampton	3–0	Bristol City	11 January 1971
7	Watford	5–0	Reading	6 January 1971
8	Yeovil Town	0–3	Arsenal	6 January 1971
9	Leicester City	2–0	Notts County	2 January 1971
10	Nottingham Forest	1–1	Luton Town	2 January 1971
Replay	Luton Town	3–4	Nottingham Forest	11 January 1971
11	Wolverhampton Wanderers	5–1	Norwich City	2 January 1971
12	West Bromwich Albion	0–0	Scunthorpe United	2 January 1971
Replay	Scunthorpe United	1–3	West Bromwich Albion	11 January 1971
13	Sunderland	0–3	Orient	11 January 1971
14	Everton	2–0	Blackburn Rovers	2 January 1971
15	Newcastle United	1–1	Ipswich Town	11 January 1971
Replay	Ipswich Town	2–1	Newcastle United	13 January 1971
16	Tottenham Hotspur	4–1	Sheffield Wednesday	2 January 1971
17	Manchester City	1–0	Wigan Athletic	2 January 1971
18	Queens Park Rangers	1–2	Swindon Town	2 January 1971
19	Portsmouth	2–0	Sheffield United	2 January 1971
20	Manchester United	0–0	Middlesbrough	2 January 1971
Replay	Middlesbrough	2–1	Manchester United	5 January 1971
21	Hull City	3–0	Charlton Athletic	2 January 1971
22	Crystal Palace	2–2	Chelsea	2 January 1971
Replay	Chelsea	2–0	Crystal Palace	6 January 1971
23	Southend United	0–3	Carlisle United	11 January 1971
24	Huddersfield Town	1–1	Birmingham City	2 January 1971
Replay	Birmingham City	0–2	Huddersfield Town	5 January 1971
25	Cardiff City	1–0	Brighton & Hove Albion	2 January 1971
26	Torquay United	4–3	Lincoln City	2 January 1971
27	Workington	0–1	Brentford	2 January 1971
28	York City	2–0	Bolton Wanderers	2 January 1971
29	Stoke City	2–1	Millwall	2 January 1971
30	Rotherham United	0–0	Leeds United	11 January 1971
Replay	Leeds United	3–2	Rotherham United	18 January 1971
31	Oxford United	3–0	Burnley	11 January 1971
32	Swansea City	6–1	Rhyl	2 January 1971

=== Fourth round proper ===
The matches were scheduled for Saturday, 23 January 1971. Seven matches were drawn, of which one required a second replay.

Tie no	Home team	Score	Away team	Date
1	Liverpool	3–0	Swansea City	23 January 1971
2	Rochdale	3–3	Colchester United	23 January 1971
Replay	Colchester United	5–0	Rochdale	25 January 1971
3	Leicester City	3–0	Torquay United	25 January 1971
4	Nottingham Forest	1–1	Orient	23 January 1971
Replay	Orient	0–1	Nottingham Forest	1 February 1971
5	West Bromwich Albion	1–1	Ipswich Town	23 January 1971
Replay	Ipswich Town	3–0	West Bromwich Albion	26 January 1971
6	Derby County	2–1	Wolverhampton Wanderers	23 January 1971
7	Everton	3–0	Middlesbrough	23 January 1971
8	Portsmouth	1–1	Arsenal	23 January 1971
Replay	Arsenal	3–2	Portsmouth	1 February 1971
9	Hull City	2–0	Blackpool	23 January 1971
10	Carlisle United	2–3	Tottenham Hotspur	23 January 1971
11	Chelsea	0–3	Manchester City	23 January 1971
12	Cardiff City	0–2	Brentford	23 January 1971
13	Leeds United	4–0	Swindon Town	23 January 1971
14	York City	3–3	Southampton	23 January 1971
Replay	Southampton	3–2	York City	1 February 1971
15	Stoke City	3–3	Huddersfield Town	23 January 1971
Replay	Huddersfield Town	0–0	Stoke City	26 January 1971
Replay	Stoke City	1–0	Huddersfield Town	8 February 1971
16	Oxford United	1–1	Watford	23 January 1971
Replay	Watford	1–2	Oxford United	27 January 1971

=== Fifth round proper ===
The matches were scheduled for Saturday, 13 February 1971 with one fixture and two replays played three or four days later.

Tie no	Home team	Score	Away team	Date
1	Liverpool	1–0	Southampton	13 February 1971
2	Leicester City	1–1	Oxford United	13 February 1971
Replay	Oxford United	1–3	Leicester City	17 February 1971
3	Everton	1–0	Derby County	13 February 1971
4	Tottenham Hotspur	2–1	Nottingham Forest	13 February 1971
5	Manchester City	1–2	Arsenal	13 February 1971
6	Hull City	2–1	Brentford	13 February 1971
7	Stoke City	0–0	Ipswich Town	13 February 1971
Replay	Ipswich Town	0–1	Stoke City	16 February 1971
8	Colchester United	3–2	Leeds United	13 February 1971

=== Sixth round proper ===
The four sixth round ties were played on the 6 March 1971. There were two replays in the midweek fixtures of the following week.

Tie no	Home team	Score	Away team	Date
1	Liverpool	0–0	Tottenham Hotspur	6 March 1971
Replay	Tottenham Hotspur	0–1	Liverpool	16 March 1971
2	Leicester City	0–0	Arsenal	6 March 1971
Replay	Arsenal	1–0	Leicester City	15 March 1971
3	Everton	5–0	Colchester United	6 March 1971
4	Hull City	2–3	Stoke City	6 March 1971

=== Semi-finals ===
The semi-final matches were played on Saturday, 27 March 1971 with the Arsenal–Stoke match needing a replay. Liverpool and Arsenal came through the semi-final round to meet at Wembley.

27 March 1971
15:00

Liverpool	2–1	Everton
Evans 60'; Hall 75'	Report	Ball 11'

Old Trafford, Manchester
Referee: Ken Burns, Stourbridge
27 March 1971
15:00

Arsenal	2–2	Stoke City
Storey 47' 90' (pen.)	Report	Smith 21'; Ritchie 30'

Hillsborough, Sheffield
Referee: Pat Partridge, County Durham

==== Replay ====
31 March 1971
19:45

Arsenal	2–0	Stoke City
Graham 13'; Kennedy 47'	Report

Villa Park, Birmingham
Attendance: 62,500
Referee: Pat Partridge, County Durham

=== Third place playoff ===
Between 1970 and 1974, a third place playoff between the two losing semi-finalists was held.

7 May 1971

Stoke City	3–2	Everton
Bernard; Ritchie		Whittle; Ball

Selhurst Park, London
Attendance: 5,031

=== Final ===
The 1971 FA Cup Final was contested by Arsenal and Liverpool at Wembley on the 8 May 1971. Arsenal won 2–1 after extra time, with all three goals coming in the added half-hour. Steve Heighway scored for Liverpool first, before Arsenal equalised with a scrambled goal from substitute Eddie Kelly - the first time a substitute had ever scored in an FA Cup final. Charlie George scored the winner six minutes into the second period.

8 May 1971
15:00 BST

Liverpool	1 – 2	Arsenal
Heighway 92'	(Report)	Kelly 101'; George 111'

Wembley Stadium, London
Attendance: 100,000
Referee: Norman Burtenshaw, Great Yarmouth

Liverpool	Arsenal

== TV Coverage ==
The rights to show FA Cup games were, as with Football League matches, shared between the BBC and ITV network. All games were shown in a highlights format, except the Final, which was shown live both on BBC1 and ITV. The BBC football highlights programme Match Of The Day would show up to three games and the various ITV regional network stations would cover up to one game and show highlights from other games covered elsewhere on the ITV network. The ITV region Anglia showed highlights of the second round tie between Colchester United and Cambridge United, it would be the last game from outside the third round covered by ITV until 1982. Highlights of replays would be shown on either the BBC or ITV.

Round	BBC	ITV
Second round proper		Colchester United v Cambridge United (Anglia only)
Third round proper	Blackpool v West Ham United; Manchester City v Wigan Athletic; Nottingham Forest v Luton Town; Yeovil Town v Arsenal; Chelsea v Crystal Palace (Replay); Leeds United v Rotherham United (Replay)	Crystal Palace v Chelsea (LWT); Wolverhampton Wanderers v Norwich City (ATV); Hull City v Charlton Athletic (Anglia); Manchester United v Middlesbrough (Granada); Huddersfield Town v Birmingham City (Yorkshire)
Fourth round proper	Derby County v Wolverhampton Wanderers; Portsmouth v Arsenal; Everton v Middlesbrough	Chelsea v Manchester City (LWT); West Bromwich Albion v Ipswich Town (ATV); York City v Southampton (Yorkshire); Hull City v Blackpool (Anglia); Watford v Oxford United (All Regions)
Fifth round proper	Colchester United v Leeds United; Liverpool v Southampton; Leicester City v Oxford United; Manchester City v Arsenal	Tottenham Hotspur v Nottingham Forest (LWT); Everton v Derby County (Granada); Hull City v Brentford (Anglia and Yorkshire); Stoke City v Ipswich Town (ATV)
Sixth round proper	Everton v Colchester United; Leicester City v Arsenal; Arsenal v Leicester City (Replay)	Hull City v Stoke City; Liverpool v Tottenham Hotspur (All regions)
Semi-finals	Everton v Liverpool; Arsenal v Stoke City (Replay)	Stoke City v Arsenal (All regions)
Final	Arsenal v Liverpool	Arsenal v Liverpool

== See also ==
- 1970–71 WFA Cup
