= Viviana Bontacchio =

Italian footballer

Personal information
- Full name: Viviana Bontacchio
- Date of birth: 11 June 1959
- Place of birth: Pezzaze, Italy
- Date of death: 23 January 2012 (aged 52)
- Position: Midfielder

Senior career*
| Years | Team | Apps | (Gls) |
| 1974–1979 | Rodengo-Saiano | | |
| 1980 | Milan | | |
| 1981–1983 | Alaska Lecce | | |
| 1984–1988 | Trani 80 | | |
| 1989–1992 | Milan | | |

International career
| 1982–1987 | Italy | 43 | (2) |
- * Club domestic league appearances and goals

Viviana "Vivi" Bontacchio (11 June 1959 – 23 January 2012) was an Italian football midfielder, who won 43 caps for the Italy women's national football team, scoring two goals.

== Club career ==
Born and raised in the Province of Brescia, Bontacchio made her debut with C.F. Cibus of Rodengo-Saiano in 1974. The team was promoted to Serie A in 1976 and later changed its name to C.F. Matra. After a season with Milan in 1980, Bontacchio spent three seasons with Alaska Lecce from 1981 to 1983, winning three Scudetti and the Coppa Italia twice. In 1984 Lecce were merged with Trani and Bontacchio remained with the club until it folded in 1988, winning three more Scudetti and another Coppa Italia.

== International career ==
Bontacchio made her debut for the Italy women's national football team against Portugal in 1982. She was a member of the team from 1982 until 1987, and played in the Italians' 1984 Mundialito win over West Germany. In October 1984 she was named Player of the Tournament when Italy played in China.

At the 1985 edition of the Mundialito, Bontacchio started Italy's 1–0 win over the United States women's national soccer team, before being substituted out for Rose Reilly on 63 minutes. It was the American team's first ever appearance at international level.

=== International goals ===
Scores and results list Italy's goal tally first.

| # | Date | Venue | Opponent | Result | Competition | Scored |
|---|---|---|---|---|---|---|
| 1 | 8 December 1983 | Bolzano | Austria | 8–0 | Friendly | 1 |
| 2 | 21 April 1986 | Belluno | Yugoslavia | 7–0 | Friendly | 1 |

== Death ==
In January 2012 Bontacchio died aged 52. Her family produced a book and DVD to honour her footballing deeds.
