= South East of England League =

Women's football league in England (1968–1982)

The South East of England League was an early women's football league.

The league was founded for the 1968–69 season, on the initiative of Patricia Gregory and the White Ribbon football team. The league grew rapidly, but suffered a split in 1970, when the Amersham Angels founded the rival Home Counties League.

In 1975–76, Lowestoft Ladies joined the league, and then won it each year until 1978–79. The league disbanded at the end of the 1981/82 season.
