= Pirelli Stadium =

Football stadium

- The Pirelli
- Current logo

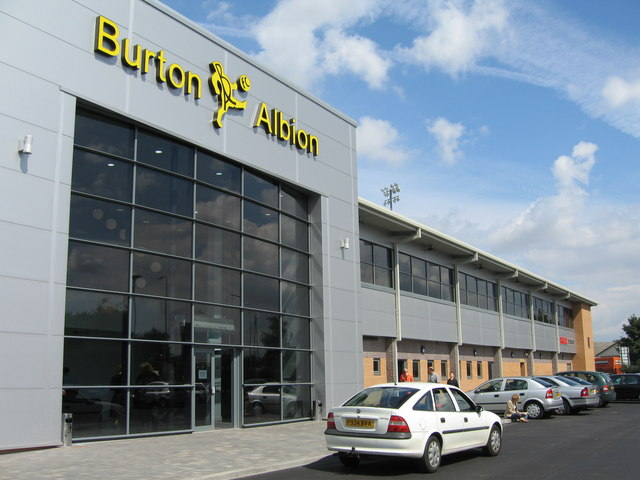
- Interactive map of Pirelli Stadium
- Full name: Pirelli Stadium
- Location: Princess Way; Burton upon Trent; Staffordshire; DE13 0BH
- Coordinates: 52°49′19″N 1°37′37″W
- Owner: Burton Albion
- Capacity: 6,912 (2,034 seated)
- Surface: Grass
- Record attendance: 6,746 (vs. Derby County)
- Field size: 110 by 72 yards (100.6 m × 65.8 m)

Construction
- Built: 2005
- Opened: 16 July 2005
- Cost: £7.2 million
- Architects: Hadfield, Cawkwell and Davidson
- Project manager: Rothera Goodwin
- General contractor: Bison

Tenants
- Burton Albion (2005–present); Burton Albion LFC (2010–present); Derby County Reserves (2007–2008); Leicester City Women (2021–present); Coventry City (2022)

Pirelli Stadium is an association football stadium on Princess Way in Burton upon Trent, Staffordshire, England. It was built in 2005 and is the current home of Burton Albion FC, replacing the club's old Eton Park home, also on Princess Way, which was demolished and developed into housing. The ground was built on the former site of the Pirelli UK Tyres Ltd Sports & Social Club, and having had the land donated to the club by Pirelli, in return for naming rights, the ground cost £7.2 million to build.

The ground was designed by architects Hadfield, Cawkwell and Davidson, and has served as the inspiration for numerous newer grounds, including Morecambe's Globe Arena, and the proposed Hayes & Yeading stadium. It gained its most recent safety certificate from Staffordshire County Council on 12 July 2010, having been subject to crowd trouble on 8 May 2010 at the hands of Grimsby Town fans following their relegation from Football League Two.

The ground has seen minor capacity changes since its construction, and the current capacity stands at 6,912, with 2,034 being seated in the South (Main) Stand. The current record attendance for the stadium stands at 6,746 for an EFL Championship match against nearby Derby County. In European competitions, the stadium is known as Burton Albion FC Stadium due to advertising rules.

== History ==
=== Planning and construction ===
Plans for a new ground for Burton Albion had existed since July 2003, when it was becoming apparent that the club's progress and ambition on the pitch was not matched by their current Eton Park stadium, despite having spent £1 million to bring the ground up to Football Conference standards following their recent promotion to that league. A new stadium would need to be created to English Football League standards in the event of a further promotion. In June 2003 it was revealed that the club were hoping to acquire land on the Pirelli Sports and Social Club, with artists' impressions of the new ground first appearing on 6 August 2003. This date coincided with the club submitting planning proposals to Staffordshire County Council for the new ground, originally intended to have a capacity of 6,000, representing a 25% increase on the capacity of Eton Park. The original proposals also included a new training pitch to be available for community use, whilst also incorporating relocation of the Eton Park Bowling Club and Football Tavern.

Club chairman Ben Robinson outlined the need for the stadium to be the focal point of football in the local community, stating: "The new football ground will provide modern facilities for the club to secure its ongoing development, and enable it to offer better coaching within the community and provide better facilities for schools and local clubs." The planning proposal also included a planning application to allow the redevelopment of Eton Park into residential properties, a move intended to fund the construction of the new stadium, and also a proposal by Pirelli to include new distribution units on their adjacent national distribution centre.

Artistic impressions were submitted to the local council by architects Hadfield, Cawkwell and Davidson, of Sheffield. Construction work was carried out by Burton firm Bison, who were the club's shirt sponsors at the time. Work began in December 2003 in anticipation for being ready for the 2004–05 season.

=== Conference years (2005–2009) ===
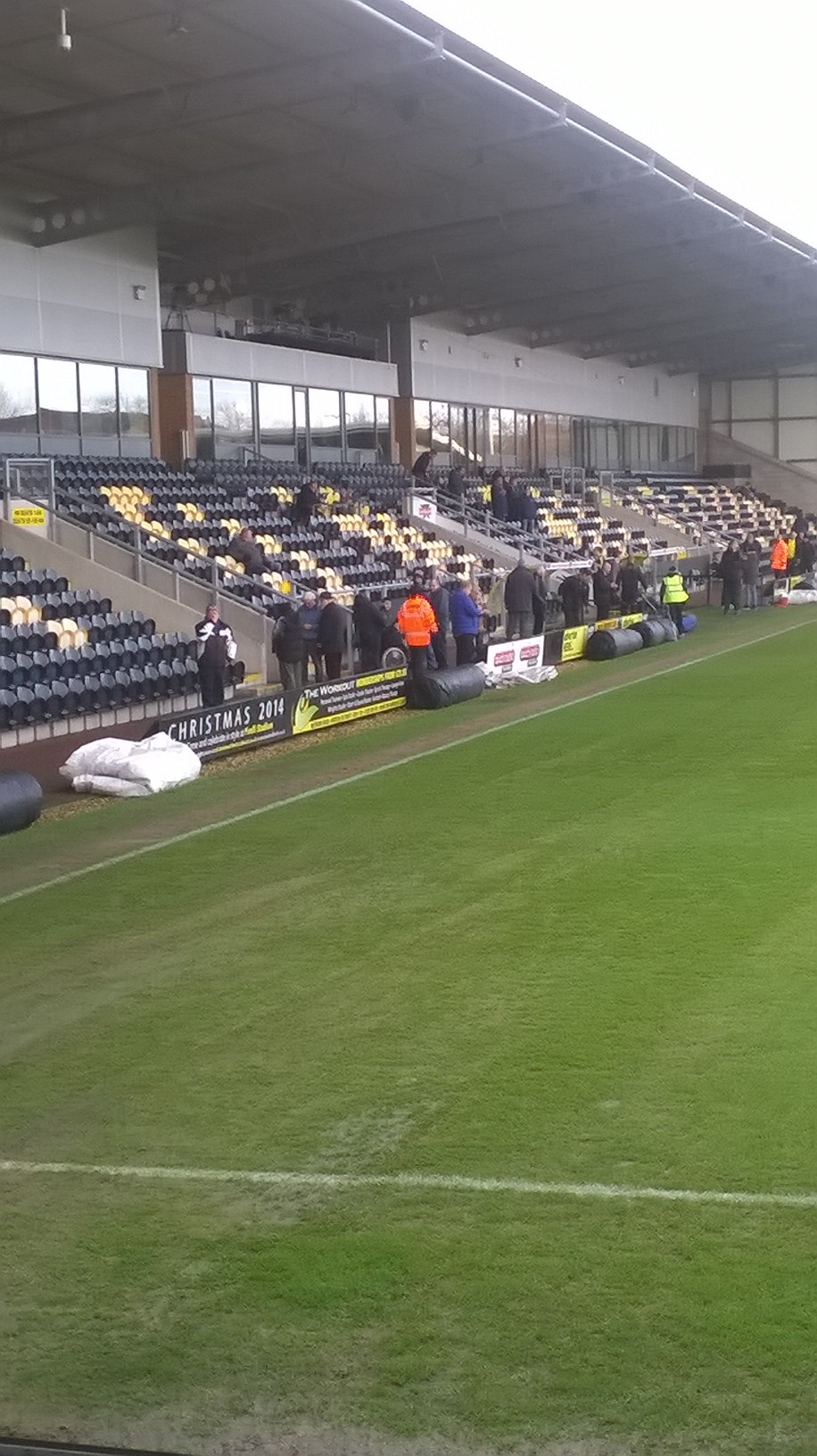
South Stand

The first fixture at the new ground was held on 16 July 2005 with a pre-season friendly against Chester City. A crowd of 1,341 saw Chester defeat the Brewers 1–0, with the distinction of scoring the first goal at the stadium landing to Chester trialist Avun Jephcott. The first Albion player to score at the ground was trialist Kevin Street in a pre-season friendly against Hull City, a match that ended in a 2–2 draw. The ground was officially opened on 14 November 2005 with a friendly match against Manchester United. Special guests Sir Alex Ferguson, Pirelli managing director Dominic Sandivasci and Barbara Clough, widow of Brian Clough and mother of then-Brewers manager Nigel Clough, marked the ceremony by unveiling a plaque. In the match itself, a crowd of 6,065 saw the Brewers defeat the young United side 2–1. Just before this match the stadium's official capacity having been fully completed had been set by Staffordshire County Council's safety committee at 6,068.

The first competitive fixture held at the ground was a Football Conference fixture against Grays Athletic on 13 August 2005. 1,654 people witnessed a 1–1, with Aaron Webster scoring the stadium's first competitive goal. Later that season on 8 January 2006, with the stadium's capacity now increased to 6,200, the stadium's capacity record was broken in an FA Cup third-round match, ironically again against Manchester United, against whom the previous record had been set. 6,191 saw the Brewers bely their non-league status against the Premier League side, earning a 0–0 draw, forcing a replay at Old Trafford. The match also saw the introduction of a new electronic scoreboard, placed in the Eastern side of the South Stand, however this was the only game that the board functioned.

CCTV was installed around the perimeter of the stadium in 2007 following a spate of vandalism, including rocks being thrown at the shop window, and trees planted as part of a landscaping project around the stadium being uprooted and damaged. On one occasion a wooden cable drum was rolled across the car park through a fence and into a drainage channel. A new electronic scoreboard was installed prior to the 2008–09 season, however it first functioned in a Setanta Shield match against Kidderminster Harriers on 4 November 2008. The new board is suspended from the roof of the Coors Visitor Stand, prohibiting its view from the away supporters.

=== Football League (2009–present) ===
Prior to the club's inaugural season in the Football League, in June 2009 the club was given the go-ahead to raise the official capacity of the ground by 712, indicating a rise from 6,200, which had been the agreed capacity at the inauguration of the stadium, to 6,912, an increase of more than 10 per cent, following discussion with safety inspectors and Staffordshire County Council. The club was also encouraged to fund a toucan crossing for pedestrians crossing the adjacent Princess Way, due to the increase in fans that had coincided with the club's promotion. Work on this project began on 2 August 2009, having originally been proposed during the planning stages of the stadium construction. These moves were acknowledged with a renewal of the stadium's safety certificate on 12 July 2010 by the council's safety advisory group.

The stadium hosted its first ever Football League match on 15 August 2009 against Morecambe, in a match that attracted a crowd of 2,742. Goals from Shaun Harrad, John McGrath, Russell Penn and a Greg Pearson brace ensured a 5–2 victory for the Brewers against their former Conference rivals. The first hat-trick at the stadium was also the first hat-trick scored by a Brewers player in the Football League, achieved by Greg Pearson in a 6–1 victory over Aldershot Town on 12 December 2009. This scoreline is also the Brewers' record victory margin at the stadium. The stadium also witnessed one of the highest scoring matches in Football League history on 13 March 2010 when the Brewers were defeated 5–6 by Cheltenham Town.

Ahead of the 2016–17 season, a new wide, full-colour scoreboard was installed above the visitor stand in place of the previous one.

== Structure and facilities ==
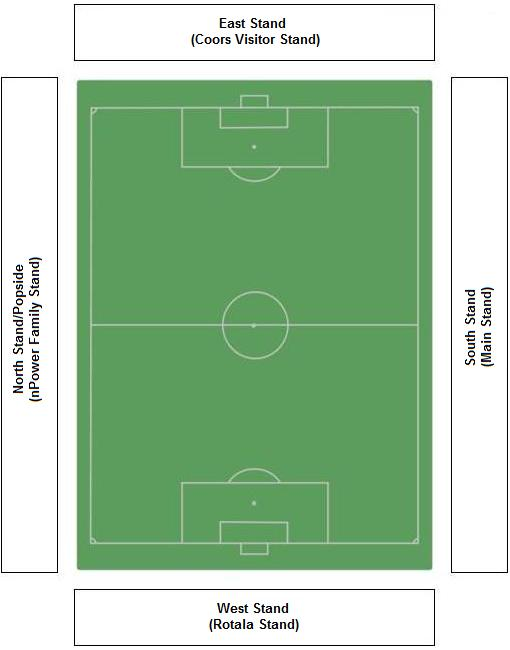
Layout of Pirelli Stadium

The stadium is divided into four single-tier stands. The South (Main) stand is the only all-seater stand, boasting a capacity of 2,034, which is segregated to provide seating for both home and away fans, whilst the ground also has three terraced stands, the West Stand (currently named the Don Amott Stand for sponsorship purposes), and the North Stand (Raygar Architectural & Engineering Supplies Stand, commonly known as the Popside) are the two home terraces, whilst the East (Russell Roof Tiles Stand) terrace accommodates the away support.

The Main stand also boasts off the pitch facilities, including conference rooms, with the largest holding 300 people, the press room, medical facilities, club shop and the Burton Albion Study Centre. On match days there are eight directors boxes available, across the Main stand. The club's main administration facilities are also located in this stand. There are four bars, one located inside each of the stands, which are all open before and during games. Other features of the stadium include the scoreboard located on the roof of the East stand, and the Police Control Box located in the corner between the South and East stands.

The training pitch on the complex that had been submitted as part of planning proposals, originally intended to be used for club training and community purposes, hosts matches for the women's team and is available for hire. The St. George's Park complex in Rangemore has become the Brewers' current training ground for the foreseeable future, while the team is still based at the stadium for changing, eating and meetings.

== Other uses ==
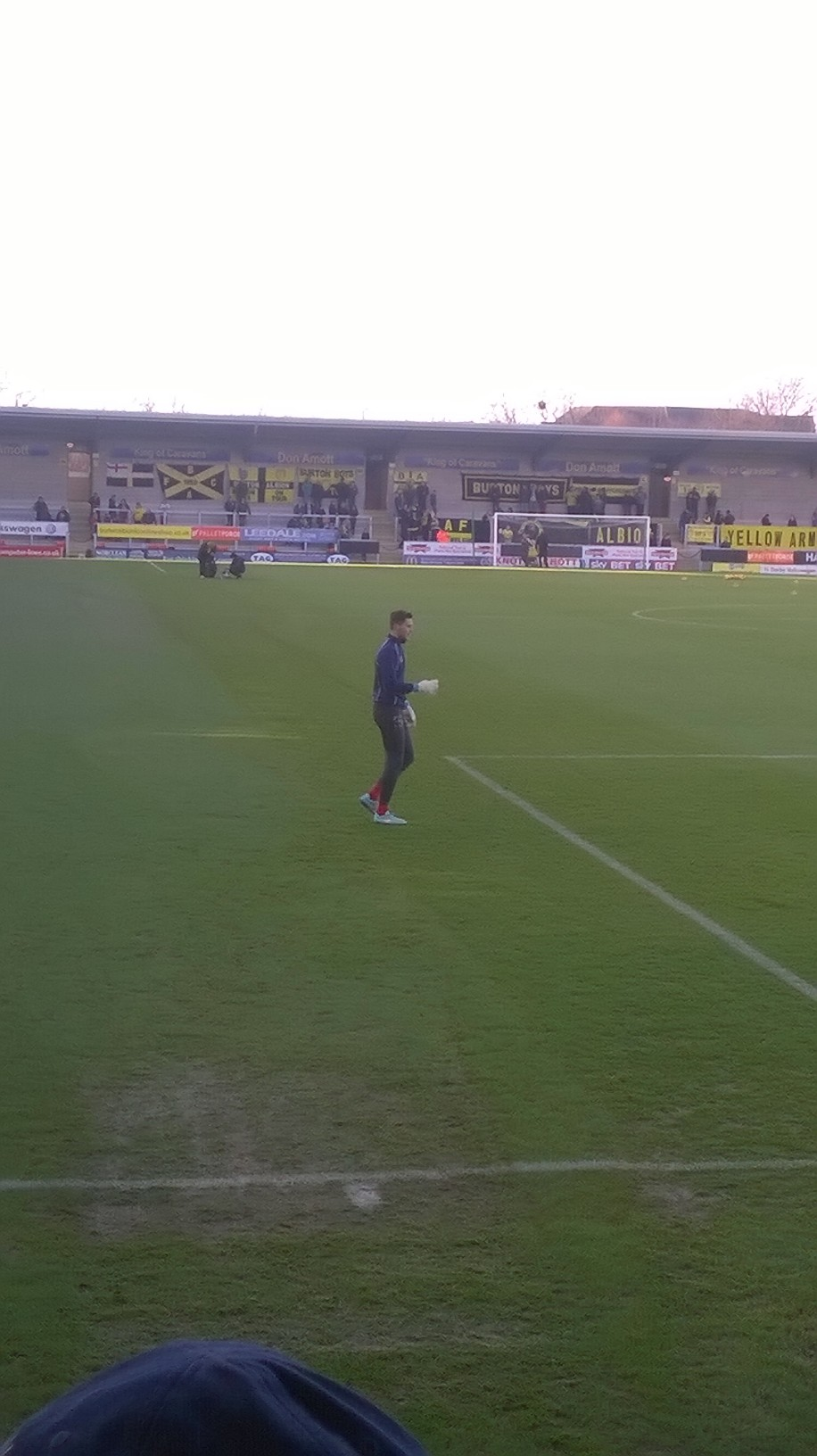
View from the Coors visitor stand

=== International matches ===
The ground hosted an England C European Challenge Trophy match against Netherlands C on 29 November 2006. Goals from Steve Morison, Kieran Charnock, George Boyd, Craig Mackail-Smith resulted in a 4–1 victory for the home side. On 26 August 2009 the ground hosted an England Under-17 international match against Italy Under-17s, the match ending in a 1–1 draw. On 30 April 2010 the ground played host to an England Under-18 Schoolboys international against the Republic of Ireland, which ended in a 1–0 victory for the Irish. The stadium acted as a neutral venue for a 2007 UEFA European Under-19 Football Championship elite qualification match between the Czech Republic and the Netherlands. Two goals from Jordy Brouwer resulted in a 2–0 victory for the Dutch.

The Pirelli Stadium was one of the venues for the 2018 UEFA European Under-17 Championship, playing host to four group stage games and England's quarter final victory against Norway.

=== Domestic use ===
Between 2006 and 2008 the stadium hosted the Conference North playoff finals before being dropped in favour of drawing one of the finalists' own grounds. During the 2007–08 season Derby County announced that a number of their reserve matches would be placed at the ground, although this arrangement was discontinued following the Brewers' promotion to the Football League.

Between 2021 and 2024, the ground was also used as an alternative home venue for Leicester City Women in the event of fixture clashes preventing the use of the King Power Stadium. The ground also hosted an EFL Cup tie between Coventry City and Bristol City in 2022 after Coventry Arena's pitch was deemed unsafe in the wake of the 2022 Commonwealth Games.

== Records ==
The record attendance at Pirelli Stadium is currently 6,746 for a Championship match against Derby County on 26 August 2016. Previous records include 6,450 for an EFL Cup match against Liverpool on 23 August 2016, 6,192 for a Conference National league match against Oxford United on 17 April 2009, which was of significant importance as a draw or win for the Brewers would have earned them the Conference title, but the match finished 1–0 to Oxford, following an Adam Chapman free-kick. The prior record attendance and also current FA Cup record attendance at the ground is 6,191, set on 8 January 2006 in a third-round match against Manchester United. The match ended 0–0 with the then non-league Brewers forcing a replay at Old Trafford against their Premier League opponents.

The record attendance for a non-competitive match was set on 14 November 2005, against Manchester United. The Brewers won the match 2–1, in a match organised for the stadium's official opening, which attracted 6,065 people. The lowest league attendance at the ground is 1,235, set on 25 April 2006 for a Conference National match against Dagenham & Redbridge. The lowest attendance at the stadium for any competitive match was set on 7 November 2018 for a EFL Trophy match against Middlesbrough U21, which attracted a mere 202 people.

== Transport ==
Car parking is available adjacent to the ground with spaces available for 400 vehicles, with space for further vehicles available at the Rykneld Trading Estate on Derby Road. On 22 October 2005 the club introduced a £2 parking charge for fans using the car park on matchdays, having previously withheld from charging fans at Eton Park. The club was forced to appease residents of nearby Stretton by allocating no-parking zones on surrounding roads around the ground following congestion concerns as a result of roadside parking. Burton-on-Trent railway station is served by local services operated by CrossCountry towards Derby, Nottingham and Birmingham, Cardiff, with further connections available, however, it is located over a mile and a half away from the stadium. Diamond East Midlands and Trent Barton operates bus services from the stadium towards the town centre and also towards Derby.

== The future ==
Since the stadium's construction stages, plans have existed for further facilities to be built as part of the stadium complex. These include plans for a pub and 40-room hotel development in undeveloped land adjacent to the club's car park, as well as a bowls green and pavilion. Whilst the club have obtained planning permission for these projects, the spiralling costs of construction of the stadium has led to the projects being shelved.
