= Rose Reilly =

Italian footballer (born 1955)

Rose Reilly MBE
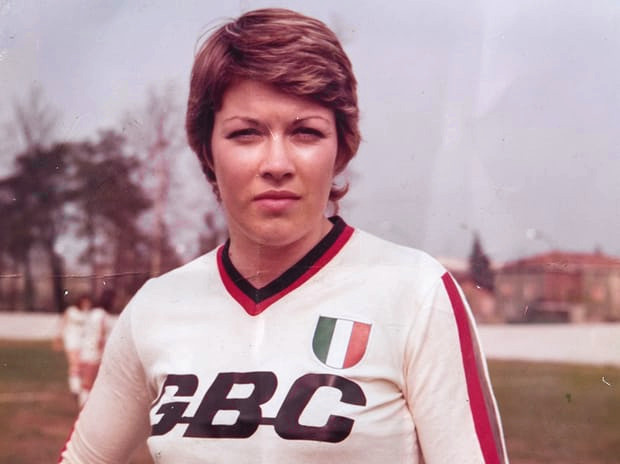

Personal information
- Full name: Rose Peralta
- Birth name: Rose Reilly
- Date of birth: 2 January 1955 (age 71)
- Place of birth: Kilmarnock, Scotland
- Position: Striker

Youth career
- Stewarton United

Senior career*
Years	Team	Apps	(Gls)
1963–1972	Stewarton Thistle L.F.C.		
1972–1973	Westthorn United L.F.C.		
1973–1975	Reims		
1973–1977	A.C.F. Milan		
1978–1979	C.F. Jolly Cutispoti Catania		
1980–1983	A.C.F. Alaska Lecce		
1984–1986	A.C.F. Alaska Trani 80		
1986–1988	A.C.F. Napoli Select		
1988–1989	A.C.F. Firenze Casa '77		
1989–1990	A.C.F. Oltrarno Firenze		
1990–1991	A.C.F. Prato		
1991-1992	Bari		
1992-1993	A.C.F. Agliana		
1994–1995	A.C.F. Agliana		

International career
1972–1974	Scotland	5	(2)
1984–1985	Italy	14	(6)
- * Club domestic league appearances and goals

Rose Peralta MBE (née Reilly, born 2 January 1955), known as Rose Reilly, is a former footballer who played as a striker. She represented both Scotland and Italy in international football.

== Club career ==
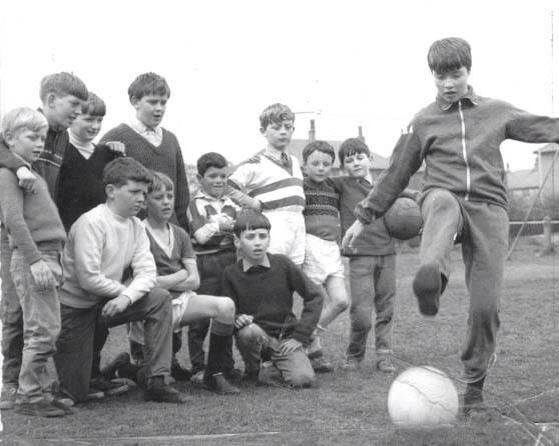
At Stewarton: Rose Reilly, aged 9 years old, shows the other children what she can do with a football.

Rose was born in Kilmarnock and was brought up in Stewarton in East Ayrshire, Scotland, Reilly began her footballing career at age seven with local boys' club Stewarton United and at one point attracted the interest of scouts from Glasgow side Celtic. She was allowed to play in the club provided she cut her hair short and called herself "Ross".

She made her debut for the women's side Stewarton Thistle Ladies in 1965 against the Johnston Red & White Rockets. She also competed in Hughie Green's Women's Football Tournament reaching the regional final, she was also part of the Stewarton side which lifted the inaugural Scottish Cup in 1971 and reached the first WFA Cup final the same year. In 1972 she moved to Westthorn United where she won the treble of Scottish Cup, League Cup and the first League championship. Westthorn also reached the WFA Cup final losing 2–0 to Southampton. A desire to play football professionally saw Reilly move to French professional ladies' side Reims in 1974.

The Scottish Women's FA had reacted to criticism from Reilly and two other players, Edna Neillis and Elsie Cook, by banning them sine die.

After a six-month spell with Reims, Reilly was bought by A.C.F. Milan and played for the women's professional team for four years, winning two league titles in the process (of an eventual eight she was to win with a variety of Italian sides). Following on from her initial spell with Milan, Reilly continued to play in Italian football until the age of 40, including spells with the ladies' sides of Catania and Lecce. Reilly twice won the Serie A Golden Boot during seasons 1978 and 1981, scoring 43 and 45 goals respectively (including Italian Cup). In the 1978–79 season she won championship titles in both Italy and France, playing for Lecce on a Saturday night and then flying to France to play for Reims on Sunday afternoons. By 1986, she was the highest-paid player in the Women's game in Europe.

She eventually retired aged 40, having won eight Serie A titles, a French title and four Italian Cups.

== International career ==
Reilly played for her native Scotland during the early 1970s. Despite having no formal links to Italy prior to her move to A.C.F. Milan, Reilly was selected for the Italy national team and was voted the best player in the Italian team which won the Mundialito (an unofficial precursor to the Women's world Cup) in 1984. It was reported that team captain Reilly scored in the 3–1 final win over West Germany in the northern Italian town of Caorle.

At the 1985 edition of the Mundialito, Reilly featured in Italy's 1–0 win over the United States women's national soccer team, substituting in for Viviana Bontacchio on 63 minutes. It was the American team's first ever appearance at international level.

== Honours and awards ==
In March 2007, Reilly was inducted into the Scottish Sports Hall of Fame, with a place in the Scottish Football Hall of Fame following in November of that year.

Reilly picked up a special PFA Scotland Merit Award in 2011 becoming the first female recipient. A portrait of Rose Reilly took centre stage at a new Scottish Football Museum exhibition celebrating 130 years of women's football in Scotland in July 2012.

Reilly was awarded an honorary doctors degree from Glasgow Caledonian University (GCU) in November 2019. She became patron of charity, Walking Football Scotland in December 2017 and supports in attending various events as well as promoting the women’s game throughout the country.

She was appointed Member of the Order of the British Empire (MBE) in the 2020 New Year Honours for services to women's football.

On 28 December 2022, the Hampden Bar (which had closed and not re-opened during the Covid pandemic), situated on the border of the Crosshill and Govanhill districts of Glasgow, was re-opened by new owners and named the Rose Reilly. Reilly herself officially re-opened the bar on 25 March 2023.

In 2023 a portrait of Rose by artist Jeremy Sutton-Hibbert was acquired by the National Galleries of Scotland. The portrait now hangs in the National Portrait Gallery. The portrait is the subject of a podcast by Professor Fiona Skillen who interviews Rose Reilly and Imogen Gibbon, Deputy Director & Chief Curator of the National Galleries of Scotland.

In 2024 Rose took part in the BBC Documentary 'Dougray Scott: Bringing Football Home'.

== Personal life ==
In 2001, Reilly lived in Stewarton with her Argentine husband Norberto Peralta and her daughter.
