= Avi Pitusi =

Israeli footballer and manager

Avi Pitusi אבי פיטוסי
Personal information
- Full name: Avraham Pitusi
- Date of birth: 1 March 1971 (age 55)
- Place of birth: Rishon LeZion, Israel
- Position: Midfielder

Team information
- Current team: Hapoel Ironi Rishon LeZion

Youth career
- Maccabi Tel Aviv

Senior career*
Years	Team	Apps	(Gls)
1988–1989	Maccabi Tel Aviv	15	(1)
1993–1995	Maccabi Petah Tikva	48	(3)
1995	Hapoel Be'er Sheva		
1995–1996	Maccabi Jaffa		
- Hapoel Ironi Rishon LeZion

International career
1990–1991	Israel U-21	2	(1)

Managerial career
- 2006–2008: Hapoel Ironi Rishon LeZion
- 2008: Maccabi Petah Tikva (assistant manager)
- 2010–2011: Hapoel Tel Aviv (youth)
- 2014–: Hapoel Ironi Rishon LeZion (youth director)
- * Club domestic league appearances and goals

Avraham "Avi" Pitusi (Hebrew: אברהם "אבי" פיטוסי; born 1 March 1971) is an Israeli football manager and former player who manages Hapoel Ironi Rishon LeZion. Pitusi started his career with Maccabi Tel Aviv. He played there for a few seasons before he moved on to play for Maccabi Petah Tikva and Hapoel Ironi Rishon LeZion.

He is of Tunisian-Jewish descent.

== Honours ==
=== As a player ===
- Toto Cup: 1994–95

=== As a manager ===
- Liga Artzit runner-up: 2006–07
