= Filip Apelstav =

Swedish footballer

Personal information
- Full name: Klas Filip Cheick Tidjane Apelstav Niang
- Date of birth: 18 September 1971 (age 55)
- Place of birth: Frölunda, Sweden
- Height: 1.86 m (6 ft 1 in)
- Position: Defender

Senior career*
Years	Team	Apps	(Gls)
1992–1995	Västra Frölunda IF		
1996–1998	IFK Norrköping		
1999	Kongsvinger IL	11	(0)
2001	Sogndal IL	13	(0)
2002–2004	IFK Norrköping		

International career
1991	Sweden U19	2	(0)
1990-1993	Sweden U21/Olympic	21	(0)
- * Club domestic league appearances and goals

Klas Filip Cheick Tidjane Apelstav (born 18 September 1971) is a Swedish former professional footballer who played as a defender. He played for IFK Norrköping and was a member of the Sweden Olympic football team that competed at the 1992 Summer Olympics in Barcelona, Spain. He was also a part of the Sweden U21 team that finished second at the 1992 UEFA European Under-21 Championship.

== Links ==
- Evans, Hilary; Gjerde, Arild; Heijmans, Jeroen; Mallon, Bill; et al. "Filip Apelstav". Olympics at Sports-Reference.com. Sports Reference LLC. Archived from the original on 3 November 2012.
