= Gilles Frechingues =

French footballer (born 1971)

Personal information
- Date of birth: 1 September 1971 (age 55)
- Place of birth: Marseille, France
- Position: Defender

Senior career*
Years	Team	Apps	(Gls)
1988–1990	Toulon B		
1990–1996	Martigues		
1996–1997	Gazélec Ajaccio		
1997–1998	Sète		
- * Club domestic league appearances and goals

Gilles Frechingues (born 1 September 1971) is a French former professional footballer who played as a defender.
