= Kokos Elia =

Cypriot footballer (born 1971)

Personal information
- Full name: Giorgos 'Kokos' Elia
- Date of birth: March 11, 1971 (age 55)
- Place of birth: Famagusta, Cyprus
- Position: Striker

Senior career*
Years	Team	Apps	(Gls)
1992–1996	Nea Salamina	97	(23)
1996–1997	Apollon Limassol	16	(3)
1997–2001	Nea Salamina	69	(21)
2001–2002	AEK Larnaca	19	(3)

International career
1992–1997	Cyprus	13	(0)
- * Club domestic league appearances and goals

Giorgos 'Kokos' Elia (Greek: Κόκος Ηλία; born March 11, 1971) is a former international footballer Cypriot striker.
