= Florent Delay =

Swiss footballer and coach (born 1971)

Personal information
- Date of birth: 23 August 1971 (age 55)
- Height: 1.77 m (5 ft 10 in)
- Position: Goalkeeper

Senior career*
Years	Team	Apps	(Gls)
1990–2000	Neuchâtel Xamax	155	(0)
1995	→ FC Sion	1	(0)
2000–2001	Yverdon Sport FC	32	(0)
2001–2005	Neuchâtel Xamax	15	(0)
Total		203	(0)

Managerial career
- 2007–2011: Neuchâtel Xamax (goalkeeping coach)
- 2011–2021: FC Lausanne-Sport (goalkeeping coach)
- * Club domestic league appearances and goals

Florent Delay (born 23 August 1971) is a retired Swiss football goalkeeper and currently goalkeeping coach of Lausanne-Sport club Swiss Challenge League.
