= 1970–71 WFA Cup =

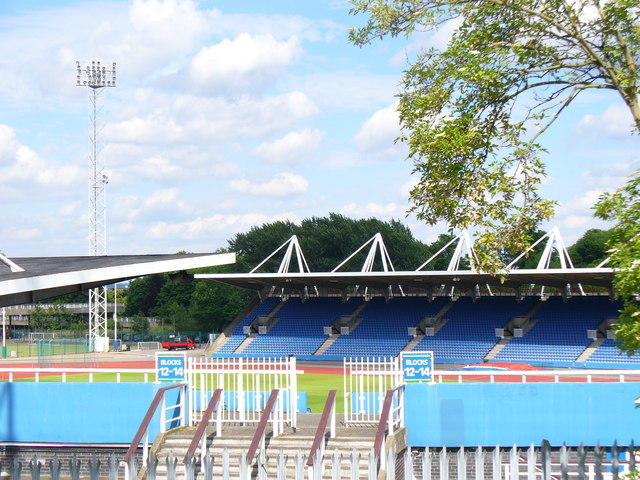
- Crystal Palace National Sports Centre hosted the Final

Tournament details
- Country: England; Scotland; Wales
- Dates: November 1970 – May 1971
- Teams: 71

Final positions
- Champions: Southampton Women's F.C.
- Runners-up: Stewarton Thistle
- Third place: Nuneaton Wanderers
- Fourth place: EMGALS

The 1970–71 Women's Football Association Cup was the first edition of the WFA Cup (Women's FA Cup), the national women's football knockout competition in England, which at the time was open to clubs from the rest of Great Britain. It was organised by the Women's Football Association (WFA).

Seventy–one teams entered the Cup, which was sponsored by sports equipment company Mitre and was thus named the Mitre Challenge Trophy.

The inaugural Cup–winners were the English club Southampton Women's F.C., who beat Scotland's Stewarton Thistle in the Final on 9 May 1971 at Crystal Palace Park; Stewarton won the first edition of the Scottish Women's Cup Final in the same year.

The WFA tournament followed the rescindment of the English Football Association's 1921 ban on women's teams' use of FA member clubs' pitches. However, the English Football League partially continued this ban for more than a decade after 1970.

== Prior developments ==
After the 1921 ban, national women's football competitions had been attempted by organisations including the English Ladies Football Association.

From 1967 until 1972, a large annual summer tournament was held in Deal, Kent with women's clubs from throughout Great Britain, playing short–form matches. The Deal International Tournament comprised 52 clubs in 1969, including some from Czechoslovakia and Austria. This was a catalyst in the formation of the Ladies Football Association of Great Britain in November 1969 by forty–four clubs, with its first AGM on 6 June 1970. It was shortly renamed the Women's Football Association (WFA). One of the Association's founder members was a club from the Republic of Ireland, Dundalk.

Women's football had been treated in hostile terms by the FA, which forbade women's teams to play at its member club grounds in England from 1921 until the early 1970s. The FA voted to revoke the ban in January 1970, but the men's Football League did not take similar action, and did not permit its clubs to host the first WFA Cup Finals. A blanket ban lasted for a further three years, according to the WFA's Patricia Gregory:

The Football League (FL, now EFL) did not lift their objections to our using their grounds until we played an International match against The Netherlands in November 1973 (a game played at Reading FC [Elm Park]).

In 1971, and in the next ten competitions, the WFA Cup Finals were not allowed to be held at Football League grounds, according to the History of the Women's Football Association, based on British Library records: "As the sport grew the WFA was reliant upon the generosity of smaller clubs". The first women's Final held at a League ground was the 1982 Final at Loftus Road.

In November 1970, the County FA Secretaries' Association conference voted to reject, by 31 to 13, the Birmingham FA's proposal to allow women's clubs to affiliate to county FAs.

Several regional leagues were formed around this time, including the Heart of England Ladies' Football League, Midland Ladies Football League, Torbay Women's League, Home Counties League, Kent Women's League, and Merseyside and Wirral Ladies' Football League

== Early rounds ==
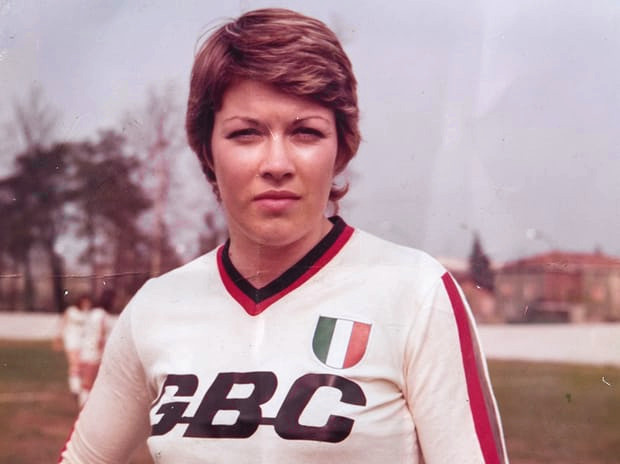
WFA Cup runner–up with Stewarton Thistle, Rose Reilly

The first news report on team entries to the Cup was in August 1970. Mitre's sponsorship of the competition continued from 1970 until 1976; the company also provided the first winners' trophy, which was used until 1979.

The 1970–71 Cup was reportedly divided into eight area groups. The eight zonal winners qualified to the quarter–finals, held in Watford.

A first–round match in Scotland was Aberdeen Prima Donnas v Stewarton Thistle (of Kilmarnock), on 29 November 1970 at the Aberdeen Lads' Club Fields in Woodside, Aberdeen. The teams would meet again in the Scottish Women's Cup Final in 1971.

In the earliest reported fixture in the Cup, on 1 November, Leicester City Supporters L.F.C. were drawn at home to The Wandering Angels (Lichfield), and in December Amersham Angels ("who were given a bye in the preliminary round") beat Luton Ladies, 5–3.

At this time, the Association was evidently open to all Irish and Welsh women's football clubs, though how many competed in the Cup is unclear. The successful Welsh women's team Prestatyn travelled to Ireland to play Dundalk in an "international" friendly match in April 1971, which ended in a 4–2 away win, and Dundalk's Kevin Gaynor was on the WFA Executive. A representative Northern Ireland team was discussed with the WFA in June 1971; eventually, the WFA came to be solely a governing body for England. The Scottish Women's Football Association was founded in 1972.

== Final rounds ==
One of the eight zonal final matches in February was won by Nuneaton Wanderers (Warwickshire) 6–3 against Bantams Ladies (Coventry), at the Memorial Park; another zonal winner was EMGALS (from Leicester, representing the East Midlands Gas Board, EMGAS), who won 5–3 at Hull. Another zonal final match was between Chiltern Valley and Amersham Angels.

The remaining Scottish club, Stewarton Thistle, played Manchester Corinthians L.F.C. in their zonal final. Thistle's key player in their win was Susan Ferries, recounted in a 216 article: "Susan was the star of an early round 5–2 defeat of the Manchester Corinthians and a [semi–final] 9–2 thumping of Nuneaton Wanderers, being described in the press as the Bobby Lennox of the female football world."

In the quarter–finals, Nuneaton Wanderers beat Kays Ladies (Worcester) on 25 April at Watford. EMGALS, Southampton and Stewarton also progressed from their quarter–finals.

The semi–final winners were Stewarton Thistle (9–2 against the injury–hit Wanderers) and Southampton (11–0 versus EMGALS).

The final matches were held at the Crystal Palace National Sports Centre, earlier the site of twenty men's FA Cup Finals in the 19th and 20th centuries. As in the FA Cup at the time, a third–place playoff was held – Nuneaton Wanderers beat EMGALS on penalties after a 3–3 draw. Soon after, Wanderers won a 10–team international tournament in Holland in June 1971.

Southampton Women's F.C. won the Cup with a 4–1 victory over Stewarton Thistle, including a hat–trick by Pat Davies. The Kilmarnock–based club, whose Rose Reilly later won eight women's Serie A titles, were the first winners of the Scottish Women's Cup in the same year; the team also reached the second WFA Cup Final in 1972 under the name Lee's Ladies.

Southampton player Sue Lopez reported that the WFA subsequently fined the winners, a league select team, for "misrepresentation as a league club". Southampton were "fined £25 at a WFA tribunal". Stewarton had considered withdrawing from the final over the issue, however Southampton were allowed to keep the trophy and went on to win eight WFA Cups.

== Group 1 ==
Only known matches shown

=== Teams ===
- Blackpool Supporters
- Elbeo
- Macclesfield
- Macclesfield 'B'
- Manchester Corinthians
- Manchester Nomads
- Preston North End Supporters Club
- Prima Donnas
- Stewarton Thistle

=== First round proper ===
All games were scheduled for 1 and 29 November 1970.

| Tie | Home team (tier) | Score | Away team (tier) | Att. |
|---|---|---|---|---|
| 1 | Prima Donnas | 0–15 | Stewarton Thistle | |

== Group 2 ==
Only known matches shown

=== Teams ===
- British Rail (Leicester)
- EMGALS, Forest
- Hull
- Leicester City Supporters Club
- Notts United
- Rainbow Dazzlers
- Wandering Angels

=== First round proper ===
All games were scheduled for 1 and 29 November 1970.

| Tie | Home team (tier) | Score | Away team (tier) | Att. |
|---|---|---|---|---|
| 1 | Leicester City Supporters Club | 8–0 | Wandering Angels | |

== Group 3 ==
=== Teams ===
- Bedworth
- Bedworth Rangers
- Connors (Nuneaton)
- Coventry Bantams
- Keresley
- Nuneaton Rangers
- Renold
- Wanderers (Nuneaton)

=== First round proper ===
All games were scheduled for 1 and 29 November 1970.

| Tie | Home team (tier) | Score | Away team (tier) | Att. |
|---|---|---|---|---|
| 1 | Bedworth Rangers | ?–? | Nuneaton Rangers | |
Winner not known
| 2 | Connors (Nuneaton) | ?–? | Wanderers (Nuneaton) | |
| 3 | Keresley | ?–? | Coventry Bantams | |
| 4 | Renold | ?–? | Bedworth | |
Winner not known

=== Second round proper ===
All games were originally scheduled for 6 and 19 December 1970.

| Tie | Home team (tier) | Score | Away team (tier) | Att. |
|---|---|---|---|---|
| 1 | Bedworth Rangers or Nuneaton Rangers | ?–? | Coventry Bantams | |
| 2 | Renolds or Bedworth | ?–? | Wanderers (Nuneaton) | |

== Group 4 ==
Only known matches shown

=== Teams ===
- Aston Villa, Badsey
- Birmingham Beau Belles
- Chelmsley Diamonds
- Elkington's Angels
- Kays, Lan-Bar
- Lodge Park
- Mid-Vale (Pershore)
- St Andrews

=== Regional Semi finals ===
All games were originally scheduled for 10 January 1971.

| Tie | Home team (tier) | Score | Away team (tier) | Att. |
|---|---|---|---|---|
| 1 | Elkington's Angels | ?–? | Aston Villa | |
| 2 | Kays | ?–? | Badsey | |

== Group 5 ==
Only known matches shown

=== Teams ===
- Amersham Angels
- Amersham Imps
- Arland
- Bracknell Bullets
- Chiltern Valley
- Devizes Moonrakers
- Farley United (Tigers)
- Luton
- Phantoms
- Swindon Spitfires
- Talon Elite

=== Second round proper ===
All games were originally scheduled for 6 and 19 December 1970.

| Tie | Home team (tier) | Score | Away team (tier) | Att. |
|---|---|---|---|---|
| 1 | Amersham Angels | 5–3 | Luton | |

=== Regional Semi finals ===
All games were originally scheduled for 10 January 1971.

| Tie | Home team (tier) | Score | Away team (tier) | Att. |
|---|---|---|---|---|
| 1 | Amersham Angels | ?–? | Bracknell Bullets | |
| 2 | Devizes Moonrakers | 2–2 (a.e.t.) | Chiltern Valley | |
| replay | Chiltern Valley | ?–? | Devizes Moonrakers | |

== Group 6 ==
Matches not known.

=== Teams ===
- Barking Belles
- Cykicks
- Edgware
- Ipswich Avengers
- Keith Blackman (Walthamstow)
- Orient
- Spurs
- White Ribbon

== Group 7 ==
Only known matches shown

=== Teams ===
- Deal & Betteshanger United
- Herne Bay Ladybirds
- Lydd
- Maidstone Mote United
- Margate Rangers
- Medway
- Ramsgate All Stars
- Thanet United
- White Wanderers (Hamstreet)

=== First round proper ===
All games were scheduled for 1 and 29 November 1970.

| Tie | Home team (tier) | Score | Away team (tier) | Att. |
|---|---|---|---|---|
| 1 | White Wanderers (Hamstreet) | ?–? | Lydd | |

=== Second round proper ===
All games were originally scheduled for 6 and 19 December 1970.

| Tie | Home team (tier) | Score | Away team (tier) | Att. |
|---|---|---|---|---|
| 1 | Deal & Betteshanger United | 3–0 | Ladybirds (Herne Bay) | |
| 2 | White Wanderers (Hamstreet) | ?–? | Ramsgate All Stars | |

=== Regional Semi finals ===
All games were originally scheduled for 10 January 1971.

| Tie | Home team (tier) | Score | Away team (tier) | Att. |
|---|---|---|---|---|
| 1 | Thanet United | ?–? | Deal & Betteshanger United | |
| 2 | White Wanderers (Hamstreet) | 1–4 | Medway | |

== Group 8 ==
Only known matches shown

=== Teams ===
- Brighton G.P.O.
- Hampden Park Kingfishers
- Hellingly Hospital S. & S. Club
- Patstone United, Rye
- Southampton
- Southampton 'B'
- Travaux

=== Second round proper ===
All games were originally scheduled for 6 and 19 December 1970.

| Tie | Home team (tier) | Score | Away team (tier) | Att. |
|---|---|---|---|---|
| 1 | Hellingly (Hailsham) | 1–2 | Southampton | |
| 2 | Rye | 0–23 | Southampton 'B' | |

== Regional finals ==
All games were originally scheduled for 10 January and 7 February 1971

| Tie | Home team (tier) | Score | Away team (tier) | Att. |
|---|---|---|---|---|
| 1 | Amersham Angels | 1–0 | Chiltern Valley | |
| 2 | Coventry Bantams | 3–6 | Wanderers (Nuneaton) | |
| 3 | Hull | 3–5 | EMGALS | |
| 4 | Kays | 5–2 | Aston Villa | |
| 5 | Stewarton Thistle | 5–3 | Manchester Corinthians | |
| 6 | Thanet United | 5–1 | Medway | |

== Quarter–finals ==
All games were played on 25 April 1971.

| Tie | Home team (tier) | Score | Away team (tier) | Att. |
|---|---|---|---|---|
| 1 | EMGALS | 2–1 | Amersham Angels | |
| 2 | Southampton | 23–0 | White Ribbon | |
| 3 | Stewarton Thistle | 8–1 | Thanet United | |
| 4 | Wanderers (Nuneaton) | ?–? | Kays | |

== Semi–finals ==
All games were played on 25 April 1971.

| Tie | Home team (tier) | Score | Away team (tier) | Att. |
|---|---|---|---|---|
| 1 | Southampton | 8–0 | EMGALS | |
| 2 | Stewarton Thistle | 9–2 | Wanderers (Nuneaton) | |

== Third place playoff ==
All games were played on 8 May 1971.

| Tie | Home team (tier) | Score | Away team (tier) | Att. |
|---|---|---|---|---|
| 1 | EMGALS | 3–3 (?–? p) | Wanderers (Nuneaton) | |

== Final ==
9 May 1971
15:30 BST

| Southampton | 4–1 | Stewarton Thistle |
|---|---|---|
| Davies; Cassell | Report | Reilly |

Crystal Palace, London
Referee: Bryn Poyner (Worcester)

== See also ==
- 1969 European women's championship
- 1970 Women's World Cup
- 1971 Women's World Cup
- 1970–71 FA Cup
