= Elsie Cook =

Secretary for the Scottish Women's Football Association

Personal information
- Date of birth: 1947 (age 78–79)
- Place of birth: Stewarton, East Ayrshire, Scotland
- Height: 5 ft 4 in (1.63 m)
- Position: Central defender

Senior career*
Years	Team	Apps	(Gls)
1962–1971	Stewarton Thistle		

Managerial career
- 1971–1972: Stewarton Thistle
- 1974–1974: Scotland
- * Club domestic league appearances and goals

Elsie Cook was the secretary for the Scottish Women’s Football Association when it was formed. Cook's advocacy for women's football in Scotland helped the ban on the sport get reversed and led to the Scotland women's national football team playing their first team game against England.

== Coaching career ==
Cook coached Stewarton Thistle to the first Women's FA Cup final in 1971. She briefly coached the Scotland women's national football team.
