= Jérôme Sykora =

French footballer (born 1971)

Personal information
- Full name: Jérôme Sykora
- Date of birth: 14 April 1971 (age 55)
- Place of birth: Pau, France
- Height: 1.84 m (6 ft 1/2 in)
- Position: Goalkeeper

Senior career*
Years	Team	Apps	(Gls)
1991–1994	Montpellier	2	(0)
1994–1996	Gueugnon	3	(0)
1996–1998	Chamois Niortais	1	(0)
1998–2001	Nacional Madeira	0	(0)
2001–2003	Pau	39	(0)
- * Club domestic league appearances and goals

Jérôme Sykora (born 14 April 1971) is a former professional footballer who played as a goalkeeper.
