= Marie-Claire Caron-Harant =

French footballer (born 1945)

Personal information
- Date of birth: 31 March 1945 (age 81)
- Place of birth: Moreuil, France
- Position: Forward

Senior career*
Years	Team	Apps	(Gls)
1968	Reims		

International career
1971	France	1	(1)
- * Club domestic league appearances and goals

Marie-Claire Caron-Harant is a French football player who played as a forward for French club Stade de Reims of the Division 1 Féminine. Caron-Harant represented France in the first FIFA sanctioned women's international against the Netherlands, Caron-Harant scored on her debut.
