= Osvaldo Peralta =

Paraguayan footballer (born 1971)

Personal information
- Full name: Osvaldo Antonio Peralta Medina
- Date of birth: 2 February 1971 (age 55)
- Place of birth: San Pedro del Paraná, Paraguay
- Height: 1.85 m (6 ft 1 in)
- Position: Central defender

International career
Years	Team	Apps	(Gls)
1992	Paraguay U23		
1995	Paraguay	4	(0)

Osvaldo Antonio Peralta Medina (born 2 February 1971) is a retired football (soccer) defender from Paraguay. He played professional football in Paraguay, Spain and Bolivia during his career.

Peralta made his international debut for the Paraguay national football team on 14 May 1995 in a Copa Paz de Chico match against Bolivia (1-1). He obtained a total number of four international caps, scoring no goals for the national side. He represented Paraguay at the 1992 Summer Olympics in Barcelona, Spain.
