= Georgios Karathanasis =

Swedish footballer (born 1971)

Georgios Karathanasis (born 31 January 1971) is a Swedish former professional footballer who played as a midfielder. He spent four seasons with IFK Norrköping and had one spell with IF Sylvia. He scored his only goal against AIK in 2002. He also played abroad in Greece in the highest division for Kalamata and also in his youth played in the national team.
