= Vladimir Shutov =

Russian footballer

Personal information
- Full name: Vladimir Alekseyevich Shutov
- Date of birth: 17 November 1971 (age 54)
- Height: 1.80 m (5 ft 11 in)
- Position: Forward

Senior career*
Years	Team	Apps	(Gls)
1990	FC Energiya Chaykovsky (amateur)		
1994–1995	FC Energiya Chaykovsky	33	(4)
1995	FC KAMAZ-Chally Naberezhnye Chelny	5	(0)
1995	→ FC KAMAZ-d Naberezhnye Chelny (loan)	7	(0)
1996	FC Energiya Chaykovsky	13	(0)
1997	FC Metallurg Vyksa	23	(0)
1998	FC Metallurg Vyksa (amateur)		
1999	FC Metallurg Vyksa	8	(0)
2000–2001	FC Energiya Chaykovsky	47	(0)
- * Club domestic league appearances and goals

Vladimir Alekseyevich Shutov (Russian: Владимир Алексеевич Шутов; born 17 November 1971) is a former Russian football player.

Shutov played in the Russian Premier League with FC KAMAZ-Chally Naberezhnye Chelny.
