= Marios Pefkos =

Cypriot footballer (born 1971)

Personal information
- Date of birth: 19 August 1971 (age 55)
- Position: Defender

Senior career*
Years	Team	Apps	(Gls)
1986–1996	Aris Limassol FC		
1997–1999	Apollon Limassol FC		

International career
1995	Cyprus	4	(0)
- * Club domestic league appearances and goals

Marios Pefkos (born 19 August 1971) is a retired Cypriot football defender.
