= Mariusz Luncik =

Polish footballer

Personal information
- Date of birth: 1 May 1971 (age 55)
- Place of birth: Toruń, Poland
- Height: 1.93 m (6 ft 4 in)
- Position: Goalkeeper

Senior career*
Years	Team	Apps	(Gls)
–1989	GKS Katowice		
1990–1991	Górnik Pszów		
1991–1992	GKS Tychy		
1992–1995	GKS Bełchatów		
1995–1999	GKS Katowice	59	(0)
1999–2000	KS Myszków		
2000	CKS Czeladź		
2001	Wuppertaler SV		
2001–2003	Lech Poznań		
2003–2005	Kujawiak Wloclawek		
2005	Zawisza Bydgoszcz (2)	2	(0)
2006–2008	Kujawiak Wloclawek		
2008–2009	Fortuna Gliwice		
2009–2010	AKS Mikołów		
- * Club domestic league appearances and goals

Mariusz Luncik (born 1 May 1971) is a Polish former professional footballer who played as a goalkeeper.

== Honours ==
GKS Katowice

- Polish Super Cup: 1995
