= Spira Grujić =

Serbian footballer

Personal information
- Full name: Spira Grujić
- Date of birth: 7 December 1971 (age 54)
- Place of birth: Pristina, SFR Yugoslavia
- Height: 1.85 m (6 ft 1 in)
- Position: Defender

Youth career
- Red Star Belgrade

Senior career*
Years	Team	Apps	(Gls)
1991–1995	Radnički Niš	58	(3)
1995–1997	Molenbeek	64	(1)
1997–1998	Anderlecht	16	(0)
1998–2004	Twente	146	(2)
2004–2006	ADO Den Haag	39	(0)
2007	Rad	15	(0)
Total		338	(6)

International career
2000	FR Yugoslavia	1	(0)
- * Club domestic league appearances and goals

Spira Grujić (Serbian Cyrillic: Спира Грујић; born 7 December 1971) is a Serbian former footballer who played as a defender.

== Club career ==
After spending four seasons with Radnički Niš, Grujić moved abroad and joined Belgian club Molenbeek in 1995. He would also play for Anderlecht, before transferring to Dutch side Twente in 1998. Over the next six seasons, Grujić played 146 league games and scored two goals. He subsequently signed with ADO Den Haag and stayed with the club for two years. After spending six months without a club, Grujić joined Rad in his homeland during the 2007 winter transfer window.

== International career ==
Grujić made his solo international appearance for FR Yugoslavia in a 2–1 friendly win away against Northern Ireland on 16 August 2000.

== Honours ==
Twente

- KNVB Cup: 2000–01
