= Oswald Snip =

Dutch footballer (born 1971)

Oswald Snip (born 9 August 1971) is a Dutch footballer who played as a forward for Eerste Divisie clubs HFC Haarlem during the 1995–1996 season, FC Den Bosch during the 1996–1999 seasons, TOP Oss during the 1999–2000 season and VVV-Venlo during the 2000–2002 seasons.
