= Robert Jones (footballer, born 1971) =

English association football player

Personal information
- Full name: Robert Stuart Jones
- Date of birth: 12 November 1971 (age 54)
- Place of birth: Liverpool, England
- Position: Midfielder

Youth career
- Wrexham

Senior career*
Years	Team	Apps	(Gls)
1989–1991	Wrexham	7	(1)
- Hyde United
- * Club domestic league appearances and goals

Robert Stuart Jones (born 12 November 1971) is an English former professional footballer who played as a midfielder. He made appearances in the English Football League for Wrexham. He also played for Hyde United.
