= Mariano Aguilar (footballer) =

Spanish footballer

Personal information
- Full name: Mariano Aguilar López
- Date of birth: 13 April 1971
- Place of birth: Spain
- Position: Defender

Senior career*
Years	Team	Apps	(Gls)
-1992	Atlético Madrid	0	(0)
1992-1994	CA Marbella	25	(1)
1994/1995	Atlético Madrid	0	(0)
1994/1995	CD Leganés	15	(1)
1995-1996	Getafe CF	3	(0)
1996-1997	Racing de Ferrol	26	(2)
1997-1998	CF Fuenlabrada	26	(2)
1998-1999	Cádiz CF	9	(0)
1999	Beijing Guoan F.C.		
1999-2000	Manchego CF	22	(1)
2000/2001	Airdrieonians F.C.	1	(0)
- * Club domestic league appearances and goals

Mariano Aguilar (born 13 April 1971 in Spain) is a Spanish retired footballer.
