= Arsenio Benítez =

Paraguayan footballer (born 1971)

Personal information
- Full name: Arsenio Benítez Garza
- Date of birth: 14 December 1971 (age 54)
- Place of birth: Luque, Paraguay
- Height: 1.90 m (6 ft 3 in)
- Position: Forward

International career
Years	Team	Apps	(Gls)
1992	Paraguay U23		
1996	Paraguay	1	(0)

Arsenio Benítez Garza (born 14 December 1971 in Luque, Central) is a retired football forward from Paraguay. He played professional football in Paraguay and Argentina during his career.

Benítez obtained his only cap for the Paraguay national football team as a substitute on 24 April 1996 in a World Cup qualifying match against Colombia.
