= Eton Park =

Stadium in Burton upon Trent, England

- Interactive map of Eton Park
- Full name: Eton Park
- Location: Princess Way, Burton Upon Trent, United Kingdom
- Coordinates: 52.8210°N 1.6297°W
- Capacity: 4,500, (720 seated)

Construction
- Built: 1958
- Opened: 20 September 1958
- Closed: 2005
- Demolished: 2005

Tenant
- Burton Albion F.C.

Eton Park was an association football stadium located in Burton upon Trent, England. It was the home ground of Burton Albion F.C. from 1958 to 2005 when they moved to the £7.2 million Pirelli Stadium. The Brewers moved to the ground on 20 September 1958, coinciding with their promotion to the Southern League, and by the time of their departure 47 years later, they were members of the Conference.

In 1972 the ground hosted the second final of the WFA Cup (forerunner of the Women's FA Cup), between Southampton Women and Lee's Ladies, with an attendance of 1,500.
