= Conny Rosén =

Swedish footballer

Personal information
- Full name: Conny Rosén
- Date of birth: 24 March 1971 (age 55)
- Place of birth: Sweden
- Height: 1.85 m (6 ft 1 in)
- Position: Goalkeeper

Youth career
- Mörarps IF
- Högaborgs BK

Senior career*
Years	Team	Apps	(Gls)
1992–2001	Helsingborg Södra BIS		
2002–2004	Helsingborgs IF	29	(0)
2009	Ängelholms FF	0	(0)
2011	Landskrona BoIS	2	(0)
2012	Ängelholms FF	0	(0)
- * Club domestic league appearances and goals as of 12 August 2012

Conny Rosén (born 24 March 1971) is a Swedish former footballer who played as a goalkeeper in the Allsvenskan for Helsingborgs IF.
