= Jamie Murphy (footballer, born 1971) =

English footballer

James Murphy
Personal information
- Full name: James Murphy
- Date of birth: 17 November 1971 (age 54)
- Place of birth: Islington, England
- Position: Striker

Senior career*
Years	Team	Apps	(Gls)
1989–1990	Leyton Orient	0	(0)
1990–1991	Aldershot	3	(0)
Total		3	(0)
- * Club domestic league appearances and goals

James Murphy (born 17 November 1971) is an English former professional footballer who played in the Football League as a striker.
