= Patricia Gregory =

Women's sports advocate (born c. 1947)

- Born: c. 1947; London, England
- Known for: Advocacy of: Women's sports

Patricia Gregory MBE (born c.1947, London, England) is an advocate for women's football in England. She was a founding member of the Women's Football Association (WFA) and acted as its second Honorary Secretary from 1973 to 1981.

She has also worked for the British Broadcasting Corporation Sport (BBC Sport), Independent Television (ITV), and as a member of the Union of European Football Association (UEFA) Women's Football Committee from 1980 to 1994.

Her latest efforts include a push to give the original 1972 Lionesses team and all female football players legacy caps.

== Career ==
=== Early activism ===
Gregory's inspiration for activism began when she watched Tottenham's male players celebrate their FA Cup victory in 1967. She has described feeling confused as to why women were not allowed to play in the FA Cup. To confront this issue, at the age of 19, Gregory wrote a letter to her local paper, The Hornsey Journal, in hopes of creating a women's football team to compete in the league, and several women replied to Gregory asking to be members. Fifteen women eventually met in her family's living room and conceived the team now known as White Ribbon. In 1967, Gregory submitted a proposal to the FA in an attempt to join the league with her team. However, due to a 1921 ban by the United Kingdom's Football Association, women were banned from joining the FA Cup leading to their initial rejection.

Despite the ban, Gregory and her White Ribbon team continued to travel the country to play against youth men's teams. Gregory also released an advertisement in a football magazine that attempted to find teams to play against. The advertisement caught the attention of a man named Arthur Hobbs. Prior to meeting Gregory, Hobbs was in charge of running women's football tournaments. After they both met, Hobbs and Gregory agreed to set up the South East of England League and from 1967 to 1969, the two set up numerous leagues together.

=== Founding the Women's Football Association ===
Hobbs and Gregory also worked together to establish the WFA in 1969.

A few months after the first WFA meeting, there was growing momentum for women's football from across the country and in Europe. The UEFA was among those that built pressure against the FA to lift the ban. In late 1969, Gregory was informed there was a possibility the 1921 ban would be lifted the following year. It was officially rescinded in 1970, just a year after the founding of the WFA. After this period, meetings between the FA and WFA led to an agreement that all clubs affiliated to the WFA were to be overseen and under the jurisdiction of the national association, which helped communicate with the Fédération internationale de football association (French for 'International Association Football Federation (FIFA) and UEFA. The jurisdiction of the WFA was limited, however, as they were put in charge of day-to-day duties, but were not financially supported or allowed to play mixed football matches.

Starting in 1970, Gregory also served as a secretary for BBC Sport.

=== Honorary secretary of the WFA ===
Gregory served as the WFA's volunteer assistant until she took over Hobbs' position as secretary in 1972. She was the secretary for 9 years until 1981 and was later succeeded by Linda Whitehead. During her time in the WFA, Gregory served many roles such as liaison officer and chair, and became the Honorary Life Vice president-of the WFA in 1984. In 1978, Gregory left her job at BBC Sport to become the first Network Sports Coordinator for ITV. She continued to work in football administration and became a member of the UEFA Women's Football Committee in 1979 where she served 7 terms. She was a member of the committee from 1980 to 1994.

=== Late career ===
In 1993, Gregory decided to return to BBC Sport. Also in 1993, the WFA and FA had merged due to financial strain, with the FA fully taking over the tasks of the WFA. She later joined the FA and was on the Women’s Football Alliance Committee. However, Gregory actively expressed her dislike for the taking over of the FA, pointing out that it does not acknowledge the decades of work and longer history of the women's game. She then retired in the year 2010.

=== Current activism ===
As of 2022, Gregory has been heavily involved in a project by the FA to award legacy caps to the original 1972 Lionesses and all female players that followed them. Awarding legacy caps is a tradition with the men's England team, and recent efforts by the FA include a commitment to honor every women's player with them as well. This process has presented some challenges as the FA did not find it beneficial to keep records when they took over women's football from the WFA in 1993. Nevertheless, Gregory and fellow WFA founder David Marlowe managed to recover many records and offered them to the FA. Some of the records were taken and some were kept in a British library. However, most of the records were disposed of.
