= Didier Martel =

French footballer (born 1971)

Personal information
- Date of birth: 26 October 1971 (age 55)
- Place of birth: Fréjus, France
- Height: 1.80 m (5 ft 11 in)
- Position: Midfielder

Senior career*
Years	Team	Apps	(Gls)
1991–1992	Auxerre		
1992–1995	Nîmes	72	(16)
1995–1996	Châteauroux	36	(3)
1996–1997	ASOA Valence	33	(7)
1997	Châteauroux	9	(2)
1997–1998	Paris Saint-Germain	3	(0)
1998–2000	Utrecht	44	(10)
2000–2003	Vitesse	78	(8)
2004	Helmond Sport	2	(0)
2004–2005	Gallia Club Lunel	5	(0)
- * Club domestic league appearances and goals

Didier Martel (born 26 October 1971) is a French former professional footballer who played as a midfielder. His career was based in France and the Netherlands. During his career, Martel played for Auxerre, Nîmes, Châteauroux, ASOA Valence, Paris Saint-Germain, Utrecht, Vitesse, Helmond Sport and Gallia Club Lunel.
