= Maarten Atmodikoro =

Surinamese-Dutch footballer

Personal information
- Full name: Maarten Atmodikoro
- Date of birth: 4 February 1971 (age 55)
- Place of birth: Paramaribo, Suriname
- Position: Defender

Youth career
- DS'79

Senior career*
Years	Team	Apps	(Gls)
1989–1991	SVV	13	(1)
1991–1993	SVV/Dordrecht'90	39	(1)
1993–1995	Dordrecht'90	66	(3)
1995–1999	NAC	115	(1)
1999–2000	→ N.E.C. (loan)	20	(0)
2001	ADO Den Haag	10	(0)
Total		263	(6)
- * Club domestic league appearances and goals

Maarten Atmodikoro (born 4 February 1971 in Paramaribo, Suriname) is a retired Dutch football defender.

== Club career ==
He started his professional career in the 1989–90 season for SVV. He later played for Dordrecht '90 (when SVV and FC Dordrecht merged in 1991), NAC Breda, and NEC Nijmegen before finishing his career at ADO Den Haag. He retired in 2001. He is one of the few players who suffered relegation from the Eredivisie a record four times.

Atmodikoro is one of the last to have been detained for refusing to do military service. He was sentenced to seven months in prison in April 1996 for conscientious objection, opposed to violence as a matter of principle, and did not want to perform alternative military service. A few months later, in August, the last conscripts were called up before conscription was officially abolished in May 1997.

Atmodikoro was sentenced to seven months in jail in 1998 for refusing to fulfil his military service.
