= 1971 WFA Cup final =

1971 WFA Cup Final
- Event: 1970–71 WFA Cup
Southampton	Stewarton Thistle
4	1
- Date: 9 May 1971
- Venue: Crystal Palace, London
- Referee: Bryn Poyner (Worcester)

The 1971 WFA Cup Final was the first final of the WFA Cup, England's primary cup competition for women's football teams. The showpiece event was played under the auspices of the Women's Football Association (WFA). Southampton and Stewarton Thistle contested the match at Crystal Palace National Sports Centre in London on 9 May 1971. Southampton won the match 4–1. There was some controversy surrounding the match however. Accusations were made that Southampton were essentially a team of players taken from several different clubs in the Hampshire League and were misrepresenting themselves. Southampton were fined £25 by the FA but allowed to keep the trophy.

== Match details ==
9 May 1971
15:30 BST

Southampton	4–1	Stewarton Thistle
Davies; Cassell	Report	Reilly

Crystal Palace, London
Referee: Bryn Poyner (Worcester)

GK	1	(England) Sue Buckett
DF	2	(England) Pat Judd
DF	3	(England) Karen Buchanan
DF	4	(England) Barbara Birkett
DF	5	(England) Jill Long
MF	6	(England) Maureen Case
MF	7	(England) Dot Cassell
MF	8	(England) Lesley Lloyd (c)
MF	9	(England) Pat Davies
FW	10	(England) Sue Lopez
FW	11	(England) Lynda Hale
Substitutes:
FW	12	(England) Jean Seymour
FW	13	(England) Louise Cross
Manager:
(England) Norman Holloway

GK	1	(Scotland) Gerry Chalmers
DF	2	(Scotland) Isobel Howie
DF	3	(Scotland) Sophia McDonald
DF	4	(Scotland) Linda Kidd
DF	5	(Scotland) Elsie Cook (c)
MF	6	(Scotland) Sandra Walker
MF	7	(Scotland) Rose Reilly
MF	8	(Scotland) Jan Lightbody
MF	9	(Scotland) Susie Ferries
FW	10	(Scotland) Moira Redmond
FW	11	(Scotland) Mary-Jane Lindsay	(substituted off) 60'
Substitutes:
FW	12	(Scotland) Yvonne Bolton	(substituted on) 60'
Manager:
(Scotland) Elsie Cook and Tom Strawhorn

== Bibliography ==
- Slegg, Chris (2020). A History of the Women's FA Cup Final. London, England: The History Press. ISBN 978-0750996594.
