= Valeri Smolkov =

Russian footballer

Personal information
- Full name: Valeri Anatolyevich Smolkov
- Date of birth: 11 June 1971 (age 55)
- Place of birth: Vladimir, Soviet Union
- Height: 1.78 m (5 ft 10 in)
- Position: Midfielder

Youth career
- FC Torpedo Vladimir

Senior career*
Years	Team	Apps	(Gls)
1990–1991	FC Fakel Voronezh	20	(2)
1992–1994	FC Tekstilshchik Kamyshin	46	(2)
1994–1995	FC Sokol Saratov	43	(1)
1996–1997	FC Metallurg Lipetsk	41	(1)
1997	FC Tyumen	5	(0)
1999	FC Spartak-Orekhovo Orekhovo-Zuyevo	12	(0)
1999	FC Metallurg Lipetsk	7	(0)
2000	FC Torpedo Vladimir (amateur)		
2001	FC Torpedo Vladimir	26	(0)
2002	FC Rybinsk	28	(3)
2003	FC Don Novomoskovsk	28	(2)
2004	FC Spartak Shchyolkovo	5	(0)
2004	FC Vichuga		
- * Club domestic league appearances and goals

Valeri Anatolyevich Smolkov (Russian: Валерий Анатольевич Смольков; born 11 June 1971) is a former Russian professional footballer.

== Club career ==
He made his professional debut in the Soviet First League in 1990 for FC Fakel Voronezh.
