= Daniel Albert (footballer) =

Israeli footballer

Daniel Albert דניאל אלברט
Personal information
- Full name: Daniel Albert
- Date of birth: 7 April 1971 (age 55)
- Place of birth: Rehovot, Israel
- Position: Defender

Youth career
- Maccabi Sha'arayim F.C.

Senior career*
Years	Team	Apps	(Gls)
1987–1993	Maccabi Sha'arayim		
1993–1995	Maccabi Herzliya		
1995–2008	Hapoel Ironi Rishon LeZion	376	(8)
2008–2010	Maccabi Herzliya	55	(1)
- * Club domestic league appearances and goals

Daniel Albert (Hebrew: דניאל אלברט; born 7 April 1971) is an Israeli former footballer.

== Honours ==
- Israel State Cup runner-up: 1996
