= Juraj Mintál =

Slovak footballer

Personal information
- Date of birth: 13 March 1971 (age 55)
- Place of birth: Žilina, Czechoslovakia
- Position: Defender

Senior career*
Years	Team	Apps	(Gls)
1991–1994	DAC Dunajská Streda		
1996–1997	FC Karviná		
1997–1998	FC Tauris Rimavská Sobota		
1998	→ MFK Ružomberok (loan)		
1998–2000	MFK Ružomberok		
2000–2001	MŠK Žilina		
- * Club domestic league appearances and goals

Juraj Mintál (born 13 March 1971) is a retired Slovak football defender.
