= Kilmarnock F.C. Women =

Kilmarnock FC Women
- Full name: Kilmarnock Football Club Women
- Nickname: Killie
- Founded: 1961 (as Stewarton Thistle)
- Ground: Rugby Park, Kilmarnock
- Capacity: 15,003
- Head Coach: Jim Chapman
- League: SWPL 2
- 2023–24: SWPL 2, 2nd of 8
- Website: http://fckillie.killiefc.com/
Home colours

Kilmarnock Football Club Women is a women's football team based in Kilmarnock, East Ayrshire that plays in the SWPL 2. Founded as Stewarton Thistle, the club is the oldest women's football team in Scotland and celebrated its 50th anniversary in July 2011.

== History ==
=== Stewarton Thistle ===
Local historian Alastair Barclay wrote in 1973 that a girls' soccer team was founded in Stewarton 12 years previously "more or less for laughs" but had quickly eclipsed the modest achievements of the town's male teams.

Sue Lopez recorded in her Women on the Ball book (1997) that the club was formed in 1961 at the Lord Provost's request, to raise money for the Freedom from Hunger campaign. The club enjoyed local success and, with star player Rose Reilly, reached the final of the first ever Women's FA Cup in 1971. Played under the auspices of the English Women's Football Association, the competition admitted Scottish and Welsh teams in its early years. Stewarton Thistle lost 4–1 to Lopez's Southampton at Crystal Palace National Sports Centre. A few months later, however, Thistle did manage to defeat Southampton in the final of the Deal International Tournament, which featured teams from across Europe. In the same year, Stewarton Thistle won the inaugural edition of the Scottish Women's Cup, winning 4-2 over Aberdeen Prima Donnas in the final.

In 1972 they reached the Women's FA Cup final again, playing under the name of Lee's Ladies due to a naming–rights sponsorship deal. Southampton beat them again, 3–2 at Eton Park in Burton upon Trent.

=== Kilmarnock ===
In 1999 the club became known as FC Kilmarnock Ladies. The early part of the 2000s saw manager Jim Chapman assemble a strong squad with several Scotland women's national football team players. The club won the league championship twice and was Scotland's representative in the UEFA Women's Cup in 2002–03 and 2003–04.

Later in the decade Kilmarnock were much less successful, with a young and inexperienced side who often suffered heavy defeats. May 2010 saw a 29–0 loss at champions Glasgow City. In 2011 they finished last in the Scottish Women's Premier League but were spared relegation because of a shortage of teams. The team's only win of the season, 2–0 against Falkirk, was changed to a 3–0 defeat when it emerged one of Kilmarnock's players was six weeks short of her 15th birthday and ineligible for senior football. However, in the 2012 season, they finished bottom again and they were relegated.

In 2017, former Kilmarnock player Shelley Kerr became the Scotland Women's national coach.

In the 2018 SWPL season, newly promoted Kilmarnock lost their first league match of the season at home against Motherwell 2-1. After the match Kilmarnock complained that Motherwell had not followed correct SWF procedures. Kilmarnock were subsequently rewarded with a 3-0 win over Motherwell. The result put them top of the SWPL2.

In January 2020, FC Kilmarnock Ladies was brought in house and under full control by Kilmarnock Football Club and was re-branded as Kilmarnock FC Women with former Rangers coach Andy Gardner being appointed as the team's new head coach ahead of the 2020 season.

In July 2022, Kilmarnock Women's playing squad signed their first ever professional contracts in a landmark move for the club. Former head coach Jim Chapman also made a return for a second spell in charge ahead of the team's move into the newly formed Scottish Women's Premier League.

== First team squad ==
As of 24 June 2024

Note: Flags indicate national team as defined under FIFA eligibility rules; some limited exceptions apply. Players may hold more than one non-FIFA nationality.

| No. | Pos. | Nation | Player |
|---|---|---|---|
| 1 | GK | SCO | Holly Kerrigan |
| 3 | LB | SCO | Eilidh Martin |
| 4 | CM | SCO | Imogen Mooney (On loan) |
| 5 | CB | SCO | Mia Scott |
| 7 | MF | SCO | Skye Stout |
| 8 | CDM | SCO | Arwen O’Brien |
| 9 | ST | SCO | Cara Gray |
| 10 | MF | SCO | Louise Cowan |
| 11 | MF | SCO | Kelsy Crainie |
| 12 | RB | SCO | Eva McKean |

| No. | Pos. | Nation | Player |
|---|---|---|---|
| 14 | CB | SCO | Laura McLaughlin (Captain (2020)) |
| 15 | MF | SCO | Lauryn Reside |
| 16 | MF | SCO | Lucie Burns |
| 18 | MF | SCO | Lisa Kirwan |
| 19 | ST | SCO | Rachel Osbourne |
| 22 | ST | SCO | Erin O’Brien (On loan) |
| 13 | GK | SCO | Ailey Tebbett |
| 6 | MF | SCO | Fiona Cullie |
| 27 | RB | SCO | Eve Watt |

== Former players ==
For details of former players, see Category:Kilmarnock F.C. Women players.

== Honours ==
- Scottish League Championship
  - Winners: 1970–71, 2001–02, 2002–03
  - Runners-up: 2004–05
- Scottish Women's Premier League 2
  - Runners-up: 2018
- Scottish Women's First Division South
  - Winners: 2017
- FA Cup
  - Runners-up: 1970–71, 1971–72
- Scottish Cup
  - Winners: 1971, 2000–01, 2001–02
  - Runners-up: 2002–03
- Scottish Premier League Cup
  - Winners: 2002–03, 2003–04, 2005–06
- Scottish League Cup (top League Cup competition prior to Premier League Cup)
  - Winners: 2001–02

== Bibliography ==
- Lopez, Sue (1997). Women on the Ball: A Guide to Women's Football. London, England: Scarlet Press. ISBN 1857270169.
